= Basketball at the 1936 Summer Olympics – Men's team rosters =

Twenty-one men's teams competed in basketball at the 1936 Summer Olympics.

== Belgium ==
The following players represented Belgium:

No.	Pos.	Player	DoB	Age	Caps	Club	Tournament games	Tournament points
		Robert Breuwer	September 29, 1907	28	?	(Belgium) William Elie Club	2	?
		Gustave Crabbe	June 14, 1914	22	?		2	?
		René Demanck	December 11, 1912	23	?	(Belgium) Fresh Air Club	2	?
		Raymond Gérard	June 4, 1914	22	?		1	?
		Émile Laermans	January 26, 1914	22	?		2	?
		Guillaume Merckx	April 21, 1918	18	?		1	?
		Pierre Van Basselaere	June 26, 1915	21	?	(Belgium) Amicale Sportive Club	2	?
		Gustave Vereecken	August 7, 1913	23	?		2	?

== Brazil ==
The following players represented Brazil:

- Baiano
- Américo Montanarini
- Armando Albano
- Pavão
- Carmino de Pilla
- Miguel Lopes
- Nelson de Souza
- Coroa

== Canada ==
The following players represented Canada:

- Gord Aitchison
- Ian Allison
- Art Chapman
- Chuck Chapman
- Doug Peden
- Jimmy Stewart
- Red Wiseman
- Ed Dawson
- Toots Meretsky

== Chile ==
The following players represented Chile:

- Luis Carrasco
- Augusto Carvacho
- José González
- Eusebio Hernández
- Luis Ibaseta
- Eduardo Kapstein
- Michel Mehech

== China ==
The following players represented China:

No.	Pos.	Player	DoB	Age	Caps	Club	Tournament games	Tournament points
		Feng Nian-Hua	May 5, 1914	22	?		2	?
		Hsu Chao-Hsiung	June 12, 1912	24	?		1	?
		Li Shao-Tang	June 30, 1914	22	?		3	?
		Liu Bao-Cheng	February 1, 1917	19	?		1	?
		Liu Yun-Chang	February 20, 1912	24	?		1	?
		Mou Tso-Yun	December 18, 1914	21	?		2	?
		Shen Yu-Kong	June 23, 1918	18	?		3	?
		Tsai Yen-Hung	August 26, 1915	20	?		1	?
		Wang Hung-Pin	February 16, 1915	21	?		3	?
		Wang Shi-Hsuan	August 17, 1914	21	?		3	?
		Wang Yu-Tseng	April 10, 1912	24	?		3	?
		Wong Nan-Chen	November 27, 1915	20	?		4	?
		Yu Ching-Hsiao	November 16, 1911	24	?		1	?

== Czechoslovakia ==
The following players represented Czechoslovakia:

- Alois Dvořáček
- Hubert Prokop
- František Hájek
- František Picek
- Jiří Čtyřoký
- Josef Klíma
- Josef Moc
- Karel Kuhn
- Ladislav Prokop
- Ladislav Trpkoš
- Ludvík Dvořáček
- Vítězslav Hloušek

== Egypt ==
The following players represented Egypt:

- Abdel Moneim Wahibi
- Albert Tadros
- Edward Risk Allah
- Gamal El-Din Sabri
- Jwani Riad Noseir
- Kamal Riad Noseir
- Rashad Shafshak

== Estonia ==
The following players represented Estonia:

Head coach: Herbert Niiler

No.	Pos.	Player
		Heino Veskila
		Evald Mahl
		Vladimir Kärk
		Robert Keres
		Aleksander Illi
		Aleksander Margiste
		Erich Altosaar
		Artur Amon

== France ==
The following players represented France:

- Edmond Leclerc
- Étienne Onimus
- Fernand Prudhomme
- Georges Carrier
- Jacques Flouret
- Jean Couturier
- Lucien Thèze
- Pierre Boël
- Pierre Caque
- Robert Cohu
- Étienne Rolland

== Germany ==
The following players represented Germany:

- Bernhard Cuiper
- Emil Göing
- Emil Lohbeck
- Hans Niclaus
- Heinz Steinschulte
- Karl Endres
- Kurt Oleska
- Otto Kuchenbecker
- Robert Duis
- Siegfried Reischies

== Italy ==
The following players represented Italy:

- Adolfo Mazzini
- Ambrogio Bessi
- Egidio Premiani
- Emilio Giasetti
- Enrico Castelli
- Galeazzo Dondi
- Giancarlo Marinelli
- Gino Basso
- Livio Franceschini
- Mario Novelli
- Mike Pelliccia
- Remo Piana
- Sergio Paganella

== Japan ==
The following players represented Japan:

- Kenshichi Yokoyama
- Masayasu Maeda
- Chang Ri-jin
- Satoshi Matsui
- Seikyu Ri
- Takao Nakae
- Takehiko Kanagoki
- Uichi Munakata

== Latvia ==
The following players represented Latvia:

- Voldemārs Elmūts
- Rūdolfs Jurciņš
- Maksis Kazāks
- Visvaldis Melderis
- Džems Raudziņš
- Eduards Andersons
- Mārtiņš Grundmanis

== Mexico ==
The following players represented Mexico:

Mexico men's national basketball team roster
Players
Coaches

Pos.	No.	Name	Age – Date of birth	Height	Club	Ctr.
	3	Carlos Borja	23 – 23 May 1913
	4	Víctor Borja	24 – 18 July 1912
	5	Rodolfo Choperena	31 – 11 February 1905
	9	Luis de la Vega	22 – 23 June 1914
	12	Raúl Fernández	30 – 17 September 1905
	13	Andrés Gómez	22 – 30 November 1913
	14	Silvio Hernández	27 – 31 December 1908
	19	Francisco Martínez	24 – 20 June 1912
	21	Jesús Olmos	26 – 20 July 1910
	22	José Pamplona	25 – 6 February 1911
	29	Greer Skousen	19 – 24 September 1916

Head coach

- (Mexico) Alfonso Rojo

Legend

- Club – describes last
  club before the competition
- Age – describes age
  on 7 August 1936

== Peru ==
The following players represented Peru:

Head coach: Pedro Vera as playing coach

No.	Pos.	Player	DoB	Age	Caps	Club	Tournament games	Tournament points
		Manuel Arce	December 25, 1909	26	?		2	?
		Rolando Bacigalupo	August 14, 1914	21	?		1	?
		Willy Dasso	January 10, 1917	19	?		2	?
		Antuco Flecha	April 14, 1912	24	?		1	?
		José Carlos Godoy	December 19, 1911	24	?		1	?
		Miguel Godoy	March 15, 1907	29	?		1	?
		Luis Jacob	August 1, 1912	24	?		2	?
		Cañón Oré	November 7, 1914	26	?		2	?
		Armando Rossi	April 20, 1915	21	?		2	?

== Philippines ==
The Philippines had a squad of 12 players.

Head coach: Dionisio Calvo

No.	Pos.	Player	DoB	Age	Caps	Club	Tournament games	Tournament points
	C	Charles Borck	January 4, 1917	19	?	(Philippines) San Beda College	5	?
		Antonio Carillo			?		0	0
	G	Jacinto Ciria Cruz			?	(Philippines) University of Santo Tomas	5	?
		Franco Marquicias			?		3	?
	G/F	Primitivo Martínez	September 14, 1911	24	?	(Philippines) Ateneo de Manila	5	?
8		Jesus Marzan			?		4	?
		Amador Obordo			?		5	?
		Bibiano Ouano			?		3	?
		Miguel Pardo			?		0	0
3	F	Ambrosio Padilla (C)	December 7, 1910	25	?	(Philippines) Ateneo de Manila	4	?
		John Worrell			?		0	0
		Fortunato Yambao	October 16, 1912	23	?		1	?

== Poland ==
The following players represented Poland:

Head coach: Walenty Kłyszejko

No.	Pos.	Player	DoB	Age	Caps	Club	Tournament games	Tournament points
		Zdzisław Filipkiewicz	June 21, 1916	20	?	(Poland) Cracovia Kraków	5	?
		Florian Grzechowiak	June 7, 1914	22	?	(Poland) KPW Poznań	5	?
		Zdzisław Kasprzak	December 16, 1910	25	?	(Poland) AZS Poznań	4	?
		Jakub Kopf	March 13, 1915	21	?	(Poland) Cracovia Kraków	2	?
		Ewaryst Łój	August 30, 1912	23	?	(Poland) KPW Poznań	6	?
		Janusz Patrzykont	May 9, 1912	24	?	(Poland) KPW Poznań	3	?
		Andrzej Pluciński	November 13, 1915	20	?	(Poland) Cracovia Kraków	6	?
		Zenon Różycki	December 18, 1913	22	?	(Poland) KPW Poznań	6	?
		Paweł Stok	March 22, 1913	23	?	(Poland) Wisła Kraków	3	?
		Edward Szostak	September 12, 1911	24	?	(Poland) Wisła Kraków	2	?

== Switzerland ==
The following players represented Switzerland:

Head coach:

No.	Pos.	Player	DoB	Age	Caps	Club	Tournament games	Tournament points
		Fernand Bergmann	September 12, 1904	31	?		1	?
		Pierre Carlier	December 3, 1915	20	?		3	?
		René Karlen	April 18, 1907	29	?		3	?
		Georges Laederach	July 1, 1906	30	?		3	?
		Raymond Lambercy	February 12, 1909	25	?		3	?
		Jean Pollet	July 18, 1912	24	?		3	?
		Jean Pare	March 24, 1913	23	?		2	?
		Marcel Wuilleumier	July 22, 1909	27	?		3	?

== Turkey ==
The following players represented Turkey:

- Dionis Sakalak
- Jack Habib
- Hayri Arsebük
- Naili Moran
- Nihat Ertuğ
- Hazdayi Penso
- Sadri Usluoğlu
- Şeref Alemdar

== United States ==
The following players represented the United States:

Head coach: Jimmy Needles (Universal Pictures (CA))

No.	Pos.	Player	DoB	Age	Caps	Club	Tournament games	Tournament points
		Sam Balter	October 15, 1909	26	?	(United States) Universal Pictures (UCLA)	2	17
		Ralph Bishop	October 1, 1915	22	?	(United States) University of Washington	3	4
		Joe Fortenberry	April 1, 1911	25	?	(United States) Globe Oilers (West Texas State)	2	29
		Tex Gibbons	October 7, 1907	28	?	(United States) Globe Oilers (Southwestern)	1	6
		Francis Johnson	August 5, 1910	25	?	(United States) Globe Oilers (West Texas State)	2	20
		Carl Knowles	February 24, 1910	26	?	(United States) Universal Pictures (UCLA)	2	6
		Frank Lubin (C)	January 7, 1910	26	?	(United States) Universal Pictures (UCLA)	2	22
		Art Mollner	December 20, 1912	23	?	(United States) Universal Pictures (L.A. J.C.)	2	6
		Donald Piper	March 5, 1911	25	?	(United States) Universal Pictures (UCLA)	2	4
		Jack Ragland	October 9, 1913	22	?	(United States) Globe Oilers (Wichita State)	2	7
		Willard Schmidt	February 14, 1910	26	?	(United States) Globe Oilers (Creighton)	1	8
		Carl Shy	September 13, 1908	27	?	(United States) Universal Pictures (UCLA)	3	10
		Duane Swanson	August 23, 1913	22	?	(United States) Universal Pictures (USC)	2	4
		Bill Wheatley	July 5, 1909	27	?	(United States) Globe Oilers (Kansas Wesleyan)	2	9

== Uruguay ==
The following players represented Uruguay:

- Alejandro González
- Carlos Gabín
- Gregorio Agós
- Humberto Bernasconi
- Leandro Gómez
- Prudencio de Pena
- Rodolfo Braselli
- Tabaré Quintans
- Víctor Latou
