= Basketball at the 1936 Summer Olympics =

1st Olympic Basketball Tournament
- Berlin 1936

Tournament details
- Olympics: 1936 Summer Olympics
- Host nation: Nazi Germany
- City: Berlin
- Duration: 7–14 August 1936

Men's tournament
- Teams: 21
Medals
Gold medalists	United States
Silver medalists	Canada
Bronze medalists	Mexico

Tournaments
← 1904 (demonstration)	London 1948 →

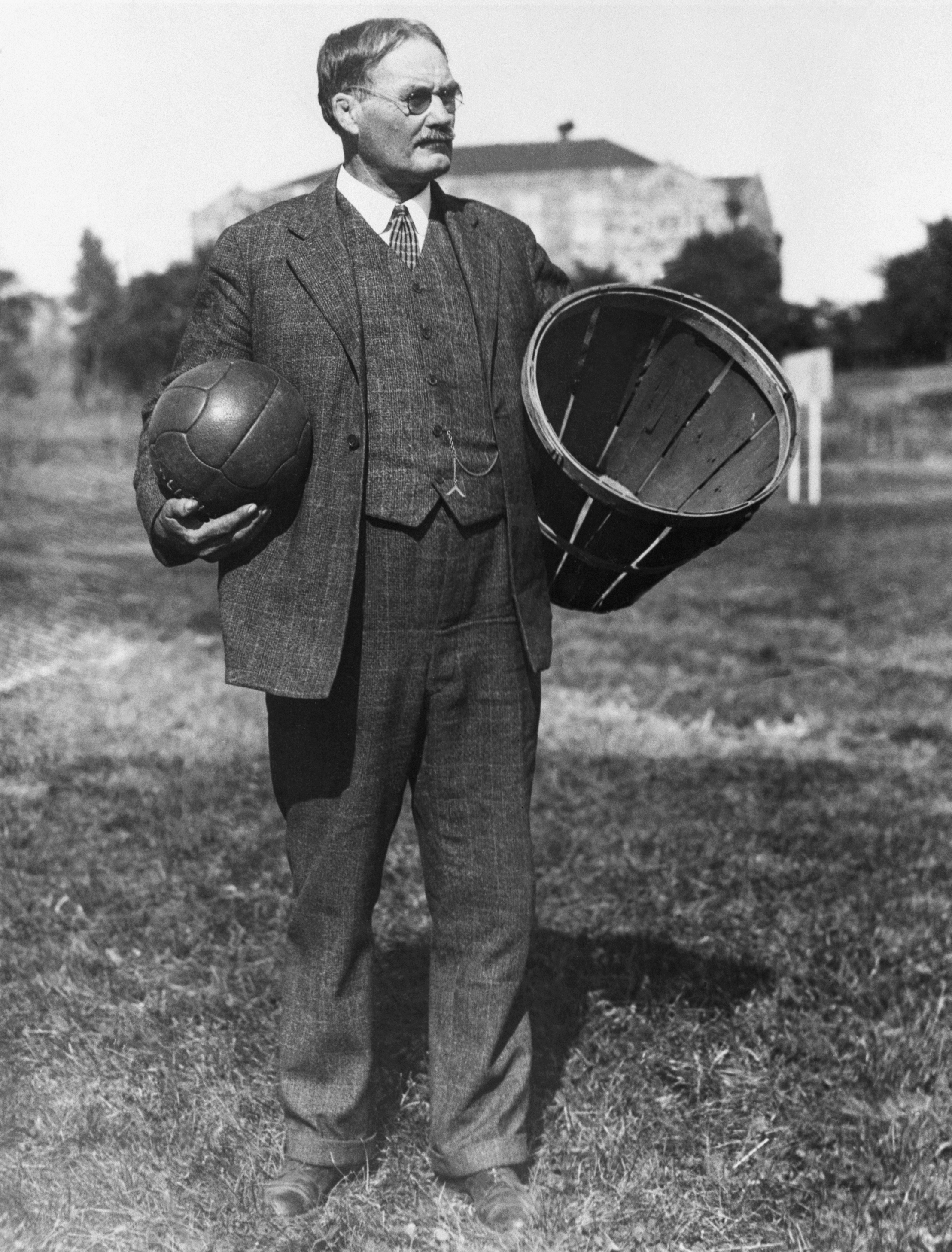
Dr. James Naismith, the inventor of basketball

Basketball at the 1936 Summer Olympics was the first appearance of the sport of basketball as an official Olympic medal event. The tournament was played between 7 and 14 August 1936 in Berlin, Germany. 23 nations entered the competition, making basketball the largest tournament of the team sports, but Hungary and Spain withdrew, meaning 21 competed.

The International Olympic Committee and International Basketball Federation, which is the governing body of international basketball, used the 1936 tournament to experiment with outdoor basketball. Lawn and dirt tennis courts were used for the competition, but this caused problems when the weather was adverse, especially during the final of the tournament.

The medals were awarded by James Naismith, the inventor of basketball. The United States won its first gold medal, while Canada and Mexico won silver and bronze, their only medals in basketball, as of 2024.

== Medalists ==
Gold	Silver	Bronze
United States; Sam Balter; Ralph Bishop; Joe Fortenberry; Tex Gibbons; Francis Johnson; Carl Knowles; Frank Lubin; Art Mollner; Donald Piper; Jack Ragland; Willard Schmidt; Carl Shy; Duane Swanson; Bill Wheatley	Canada; Gordon Aitchison; Ian Allison; Art Chapman; Chuck Chapman; Edward Dawson; Irving Meretsky; Doug Peden; James Stewart; Malcolm Wiseman; Stanley Nantais	Mexico; Carlos Borja; Víctor Borja; Rodolfo Choperena; Luis de la Vega; Raúl Fernández; Andrés Gómez; Silvio Hernández; Francisco Martínez; Jesús Olmos; José Pamplona; Greer Skousen

Note: The International Olympic Committee medal database shows only these players as medalists. They all played at least one match during the tournament. The reserve players are not listed as medalists.

== Results ==
=== Brackets ===
==== Third round onwards ====
Third round
Philippines	39
Estonia	22
Italy	27
Chile	19
Mexico	28
Japan	22
Canada	27
Switzerland	9
Uruguay	28
Czechoslovakia	19
Poland	33
Brazil	25

Quarter-finals
United States	56
Philippines	23
Italy	17
Mexico	34
Canada	41
Uruguay	21
Poland
bye

Semi-finals
United States	25
Mexico	10
Canada	42
Poland	15

Gold medal match
14 August
United States	19
Canada	8
Bronze medal match
14 August
Mexico	26
Poland	12

==== Fifth-place classification ====
Classification semifinal		5th place game
Philippines	32
Italy	14
Italy	14	Philippines	32
		Uruguay	23

=== First round ===
Winners advanced to the second round, while losers competed in the first consolation round for another chance to move on.

7 August 1936	Estonia	34–29	France	Berlin, Germany
	Scoring by half: 16–17, 18–12

7 August 1936	Turkey	16–30	Chile	Berlin, Germany
	Scoring by half: 5–15, 11–15

7 August 1936	Switzerland	25–18	Germany	Berlin, Germany
	Scoring by half: 8–10, 17–8

7 August 1936	Poland	28–44	Italy	Berlin, Germany
	Scoring by half: 12–25, 16–19

7 August 1936	Peru	35–22	Egypt	Berlin, Germany
	Scoring by half: 17–6, 18–16

7 August 1936	Latvia	20–17	Uruguay	Berlin, Germany
	Scoring by half: 11–11, 9–6

7 August 1936	Canada	24–17	Brazil	Berlin, Germany
	Scoring by half: 14–7, 10–10

7 August 1936	Japan	35–19	China	Berlin, Germany
	Scoring by half: 15–10, 20–9

7 August 1936	Belgium	9–32	Mexico	Berlin, Germany
	Scoring by half: 2–21, 7–11

Byes: Philippines, United States (drawn against Spain, who withdrew) and Czechoslovakia (drawn against Hungary, who withdrew).

==== First consolation round ====
Winners returned to the main competition for the second round, while losers were eliminated.

- Uruguay 17–10 Belgium
- China 45–38 France
- Egypt 33–23 Turkey

Byes: Brazil, Germany and Poland

=== Second round ===
Winners advanced to the third round. Losers competed in the second consolation round for another chance to move on.

- Philippines 32–30 Mexico
- Japan 43–31 Poland
- Uruguay 36–23 Egypt
- Peru 29–21 China
- United States 52–28 Estonia
- Italy 58–16 Germany
- Switzerland 25–12 Czechoslovakia
- Chile 23–18 Brazil
- Canada 34–23 Latvia

==== Second consolation round ====
- Poland 28-23 Latvia
- Brazil 32-14 China
- Mexico 32-10 Egypt
- Czechoslovakia 20-9 Germany

Bye: Estonia

=== Third round ===
The third round was the first to cause automatic elimination for losers, with no consolation round. Winners advanced to the quarterfinals.

Philippines	39–22	Estonia
Scoring by half: 21–4, 18–18

Berlin, Germany

Chile	19–27	Italy
Scoring by half: 12–16, 7–11

Berlin, Germany

Mexico	28–22	Japan
Scoring by half: 12–8, 16–14

Berlin, Germany

Switzerland	9–27	Canada
Scoring by half: 1–13, 8–14

Berlin, Germany

Uruguay	28–19	Czechoslovakia
Scoring by half: 14–8, 14–11

Berlin, Germany

Brazil	25–33	Poland
Scoring by half: 10–17, 15–16

Berlin, Germany

Byes: United States and Peru

=== Quarterfinals ===
Winners of the quarterfinals advanced to the medals round, with losers playing in classification matches.

- United States 56–23 Philippines
- Mexico 24–17 Italy
- Canada 41–21 Uruguay

Bye: Poland (Peru withdrew from the Olympic Games to protest the decision of the Olympic Committee and FIFA in the football tournament).

=== Classification 5–8 ===
==== Preliminary match ====
- Philippines 32–14 Italy

Bye: Uruguay (Peru withdrew from the competition – see above).

==== Fifth place match ====
- Philippines 33–23 Uruguay

== Medals round ==
=== Semifinals ===
13 August

United States	25–10	Mexico
Scoring by half: 13–2, 12–8

Berlin, Germany

Poland	15–42	Canada
Scoring by half: 6–23, 9–19

Berlin, Germany

=== Bronze medal match ===
14 August

(bronze) Mexico	26–12	Poland
Scoring by half: 23–8, 3–4

Berlin, Germany

=== Final ===
14 August
18:00

(gold) United States	19–8	Canada (silver)
Scoring by half: 15–4, 4–4
Pts: Fortenberry 8

Berlin, Germany
Attendance: 900+

The final was played in driving rain, turning the court into a quagmire such that it was impossible to dribble, while the conditions kept scoring to a minimum: highest scorer in the game was Joe Fortenberry of the United States, with eight points. In addition, almost all of the nearly 1,000 in attendance had to stand in the rain throughout the final, as there were virtually no seats for spectators.

== Awards ==
1936 Olympic Basketball champions

United States
First title

== Participating nations ==
For the team rosters see: Basketball at the 1936 Summer Olympics – Men's team squads.

Each country was allowed to enter one team of 14 players and they all were eligible for participation; however, only seven were allowed to dress for competition at any one game.

A total of 199(*) basketball players from 21 nations competed at the Berlin Games:

- Belgium (8 – from a squad of 14)
- Brazil (8 – from a squad of 10)
- Canada (9 – from a squad of 14)
- Chile (7 – from a squad of 11)
- Republic of China (13 – from a squad of 14)
- Czechoslovakia (12 – from a squad of 12)
- Egypt (7 – from a squad of 10)
- Estonia (8 – from a squad of 11)
- France (11 – from a squad of 14)
- Germany (10 – from a squad of 14)
- Italy (13 – from a squad of 14)
- Japan (8 – from a squad of 11)
- Latvia (7 – from a squad of 11)
- Mexico (11 – from a squad of 11)
- Peru (9 – from a squad of 13)
- Philippines (9 – from a squad of 12)
- Poland (10 – from a squad of 14)
- Switzerland (8 – from a squad of 13)
- Turkey (8 – from a squad of 10)
- United States (14 – alternating squads of seven players)
- Uruguay (9 – from a squad of 13)

Hungary and Spain withdrew before playing a match.

(*) NOTE: There are only players counted, which participated in one game at least.

Not all reserve players are known.

== Summary ==
Place	Nation
1	United States
	Head Coach: James Needles (Universal Pictures (CA)); Asst. coach: Gene Johnson (Globe Refiners); Sam Balter (Universal Pictures (UCLA)); Ralph Bishop (Washington); Joe Fortenberry (Globe Refiners (West Texas State)); Tex Gibbons (Globe Refiners (Southwestern)); Francis Johnson (Captain) (Globe Refiners (Wichita)); Carl Knowles (Universal Pictures (UCLA)); Frank Lubin (Universal Pictures (UCLA)); Art Mollner (Universal Pictures (L.A. J.C.)); Donald Piper (Universal Pictures (UCLA)); Jack Ragland (Globe Refiners (Wichita State)); Willard Schmidt (Globe Refiners (Creighton)); Carl Shy (Universal Pictures (UCLA)); Duane Swanson (Universal Pictures (USC)); Bill Wheatley (Globe Refiners)
2	Canada
	Head Coach: Gordon Fuller (Windsor Ford V-8's); Asst. coach:Julius Goldman (Windsor Ford V-8's); Gordon Aitchison (Windsor Ford V-8's); Ian Allison (Windsor Ford V-8's); Art Chapman (Victoria Blue Ribbon); Chuck Chapman (Victoria Blue Ribbon); Edward Dawson (Windsor Ford V-8's); Irving Meretsky (Windsor Ford V-8's); Doug Peden (Victoria Blue Ribbon); James Stewart (Windsor Ford V-8's); Malcolm Wiseman (Windsor Ford V-8's) Norman Dawson (Windsor Ford V-8's); Don Gray (Windsor Ford V-8's); Stanley Nantais (Windsor Ford V-8's); Bob Osborne (University of British Columbia); Tom Pendlebury (Windsor Ford V-8's)
3	Mexico
	Carlos Borja; Víctor Borja; Rodolfo Choperena; Luis de la Vega; Raúl Fernández; Andrés Gómez; Silvio Hernández; Francisco Martínez; Jesús Olmos; José Pamplona; Greer Skousen
4	Poland Head Coach: Walenty Kłyszejko; Zdzisław Filipkiewicz; Florian Grzechowiak; Zdzisław Kasprzak; Jakub Kopf; Ewaryst Łój; Janusz Patrzykont; Andrzej Pluciński; Zenon Różycki; Paweł Stok; Edward Szostak
5	Philippines Head Coach: Dionisio Calvo; Charles Borck; Jacinto Ciria Cruz; Franco Marquicias; Primitivo Martínez; Jesús Marzan; Amador Obordo; Bibiano Ouano; Ambrosio Padilla; Fortunato Yambao Antonio Carillo; Miguel Pardo; John Worrell
6	Uruguay Head Coach: Juan A. Collazo; Gregorio Agós; Umberto Bernasconi Galvar; Rodolfo Braselli; Prudencio de Pena; Carlos Gabín; Leandro Gómez Harley; Alejandro González Roig; Víctor Latou Jaume; Tabaré Quintans Héctor González; Alberto Martí; Amílcar Mesa
7	Italy Coaches: Decio Scuri-Guido Graziani; Gino Basso; Ambrogio Bessi; Enrico Castelli; Galeazzo Dondi; Livio Franceschini; Emilio Giassetti; Giancarlo Marinelli; Adolfo Mazzini; Mario Novelli; Sergio Paganella; Michele Pelliccia; Remo Piana; Egidio Premiani
8	Peru Head Coach: Pedro Vera; Manuel Arce; Rolando Bacigalupo; Willy Dasso; Antuco Flecha; José Carlos Godoy; Miguel Godoy; Luis Jacob; Cañón Oré; Armando Rossi Koko Cárdenas; Roberto Rospigliosi; Fernando Ruiz; Pedro Vera
9–14	Brazil Armando Albano; Baiano; Coroa; Carmino de Pilla; Nelson Monteiro de Souza; Miguel Pedro Martinez Lopes; Américo Montanarini; Pavão Cacau; José Oscar Zelaya Alonso
9–14	Chile Luis Carrasco; Augusto Carvacho; José González; Eusebio Hernández; Luis Ibaseta; Eduardo Kapstein Suckel; Michel Mehech
9–14	Czechoslovakia Jiří Čtyroký; Alois Dvořáček; Ludvík Dvořáček; František Hájek; Vítězslav Hloušek; Josef Klíma; Karel Kuhn; Josef Moc; František Picek; F. Prokop; Ladislav Prokop; Ladislav Trpkoš
9–14	Estonia Head Coach: Herbert Niiler (Tartu NMKÜ); Erich Altosaar (Tallinna Kalev); Artur Amon (Tartu NMKÜ); Aleksander Illi (Tartu NMKÜ); Vladimir Kärk (Tartu NMKÜ); Robert Keres (Tartu NMKÜ); Evald Mahl (Tartu NMKÜ); Aleksander Margiste (Tallinna Kalev); Heino Veskila (Tartu NMKÜ) Bernhard Nooni (Tallinna Kalev); Leonid Saar (Tallinna NMKÜ); Georg Vinogradov (Tallinna Russ)
9–14	Japan Richin Cho; Takehiko Kanakogi; Masayasu Maeda; Satoshi Matsui; Uichi Munakata; Takao Nakae; Seikyu Ri; Kenshichi Yokoyama
9–14	Switzerland Fernand Bergmann; Pierre Carlier; René Laederach; Raymond Lambercy; John Pallet; Jean Pare; Marcel Wuilleunier
15–18	Republic of China Feng; Hsu; Li Shao-Tang; Liu Bao-Cheng; Liu Yun-Chang; Mou Tso-Yun; Shen Yi-Tung; Tsai Yen-Hung; Wang Hung-Pin; Wang Shi-Hsuan; Wang Yu-Tseng; Wong Nan-Chen; Yu Sai-Chang
15–18	Egypt Abdel Moneim Wahib Hussein; Albert Fahmy Tadros; Edward Riskalla; Gamal el din Sabri; Goanni Nosseir; Kamal Riad; Mohamed Rashad Shafshak
15–18	Germany Head Coach: Hermann Niebuhr; Bernhard Cuiper (Heeressportschule Wünsdorf); Robert Duis (DSC Berlin); Karl Endres (Heeressportschule Wünsdorf); Emil Göing (Heeressportschule Wünsdorf); Otto Kuchenbecker (Luftwaffen-Sportschule Spandau); Emil Lohbeck (Heeressportschule Wünsdorf); Hans Niclaus (Heeressportschule Wünsdorf); Kurt Oleska (Heeressportschule Wünsdorf); Siegfried Reischieß (VfB Breslau); Heinz Steinschulte (Luftwaffen-Sportschule Spandau) Willy Daume (TV Eintracht Dortmund); Otto Gottwald (Post SV Bad Kreuznach); Adolf Künzel (NSTV Breslau); Jupp Schäfer (TV Kreuznach 1848)
15–18	Latvia Head Coach: Rihards Dekšenieks; Eduards Andersons (US); Voldemārs Elmūts (US); Mārtiņš Grundmanis (ASK); Rudolfs Jurciņš (US); Maksis Kazaks (LJ); Visvaldis Melderis (ASK); Džems Raudziņš (US) Edgars Rūja (US); Askolds Hermanovskis (LJ); Aleksejs Anufrijevs (Starts); J.Tiltiņš (US)
19–21	Belgium Robert Brouwer; Gustave Crabbe; René Demanck; Raymond Gerard; Émile Laermans; Guillaume Merckx; Pierre van Basselaere; Gustave Vereecken
19–21	France Pierre Boel (Olympique Lillois); Pierre Caque (Reims); Georges Carrier (CS Plaisance); Robert Cohu (Stade Français); Jean Couturier (Reims); Jacques Flouret (Paris UC); Edmond Leclere (Charleville); Étienne Onimus (CA Mulhouse); Fernand Prud'homme (AS Hippolyte); Étienne Roland (US Métro); Lucien Thèze (Romilly)
19–21	Turkey Head Coach: Rupen Semerciyan; Şeref Alemdar (Galatasaray); Hayri Arsebük (Galatasaray); Nihat Riza Ertuğ (Galatasaray); Jak Habib (Barkhoba); Naili Moran (Galatasaray); Hazdai Penso (Barkhoba); Dionis Sakalak (Kurtulus); Sadri Usluoğlu Kamil Ocak (Galatasaray)

Note: Hungary and Spain withdrew before competition started
