= Basketball in Germany =

- Country: Germany
- Governing body: German Basketball Federation
- National team: Germany
- First played: 1896

National competitions
- German Basketball Cup; BBL Champions Cup

Club competitions
- Basketball Bundesliga (BBL); ProA; ProB; Damen-Basketball-Bundesliga (DBBL)

International competitions
- FIBA World Cup; Summer Olympic Games; EuroBasket; EuroLeague; EuroCup; Basketball Champions League; FIBA Women's World Cup; EuroBasket Women; EuroLeague Women; EuroCup Women

Basketball is one of the most popular sports in Germany, and is played on both the amateur and professional levels. Basketball has a long history in Germany, with its popularity having developed slowly.

== Beginning ==
Basketball was first introduced to Germany in 1896, by August Hermann, a physical education pioneer. Hermann's son Ernst had emigrated to Boston and introduced the game of basketball to his father. Originally, Hermann was searching for a sport for girls to play as an alternative to soccer. August held the first game in Germany in the city of Braunschweig where he was a well-known advocate and instructor of physical education and sports. Thereafter, he invented a number of sports and wrote rule books. He wrote the rule book for "Korbball" (basketball) that same year. He adopted the name Korbball because at the time, American expressions and names were frowned upon. Hermann was a board member of the "Central Committee on Public and Youth Games in Germany" and in this capacity, he attempted to publicize the game of basketball for girls. Despite these efforts, basketball didn't take hold until several decades later. In 1921, basketball was included in the guidelines for physical education for girls, but only a few schools participated. Because of the lack of participation and lack of sport association affiliation, basketball had no significant following. Basketball developed very slowly. Germany was one of the last countries in Europe to adopt basketball as a major sport.

== Increase in popularity ==
In 1933, Hermann Niebuhr—who had become involved with basketball at an American college in Istanbul—returned to Germany and re-introduced basketball to several universities and sports clubs. Niebuhr is considered the "Father of German Basketball." As a result of implementing basketball at universities in Munich, Breslau, Gera, Wünsdorf and Bad Kreuznach, foreign students began to play. Foreign students and German physical instructors were either from the United States or had traveled to the United States and saw basketball games there. These were the first to request increasing basketball's presence. In 1935, basketball became an organized sport. In April 1935 there were four organized basketball teams in Germany and that increased to 153 by 1937. The first national basketball championships were organized in 1939.

== Berlin Olympics ==
In 1936, the International Olympic Committee included basketball as an official medal event. The 1936 Summer Olympics were held in Berlin. Though the basketball games were played outdoors in poor conditions, there was significant media coverage of the sport in Germany. Germany placed 17th out of 21 teams.

=== 1936 Germany Olympic basketball results ===
- Germany lost to Switzerland 25-18
- Germany beat Spain via a walkover as Spain withdrew from Olympics due to the Spanish Civil War
- Germany lost to Italy 58 - 16
- Germany lost to Czechoslovakia 20-9

=== Members of the German Olympic Team ===
- Hermann Niebuhr - Coach
- Hans Niclaus (Heeressportschule Wünsdorf)
- Emil Göing (Heeressportschule Wünsdorf)
- Kurt Oleska (Heeressportschule Wünsdorf)
- Bernhard Cuiper (Heeressportschule Wünsdorf)
- Karl Endres (Heeressportschule Wünsdorf)
- Emil Lohbeck (Heeressportschule Wünsdorf)
- Robert Duis (DSC Berlin)
- Otto Kuchenbecker (Luftwaffen-Sportschule Spandau)
- Siegfried Reischieß (VfB Breslau)
- Heinz Steinschulte (Luftwaffen-Sportschule Spandau)

Despite increased interest in the sport during the late 1930s, World War II stopped all development of basketball in Germany.

== New beginning following World War II ==
Following World War II, the United States government sent the Harlem Globetrotters to Germany in 1951 to help counter communism. The game drew 75,000 spectators which set a world record for the largest crowd to watch a basketball game. Although The International Basketball Federation (French: Fédération Internationale de Basketball or FIBA) was created in 1932, Germany was not one of the first eight European teams. Germany's first appears in the European Championships was in 1951 in Paris. They placed 15th out of 18 teams. In 1956, the International Basketball Federation (French: Fédération Internationale de Basketball or FIBA) was relocated to Munich from Geneva.

== Deutscher Basketball Bund ==
The German Basketball Federation, or Deutscher Basketball Bund, was founded in 1949.

== The Bundesliga ==
The German Basketball League (the Basketball-Bundesliga, or BBL) was created in 1964. On 1 October 1966, the first season began. This is the highest level tier of professional club basketball competition in Germany. It currently has 18 teams, competing for the national champion title.

== Connection with basketball in America ==
There is a strong American connection and many of the German teams recruit players from American universities. There are also many Germans who are recruited to play at the college level and in the National Basketball Association, or NBA.

== Notable people associated with basketball in germany ==
- Dirk Bauermann
- August Hermann
- Hermann Niebuhr

== Notable German basketball players ==
- Uwe Blab
- Shawn Bradley
- Frido Frey
- Richard Fröhlich
- Elias Harris
- Jens Kujawa
- Tim Ohlbrecht
- Dirk Nowitzki
- Henrik Rödl
- Detlef Schrempf
- Dennis Schröder
- Daniel Theis
- Franz Wagner
- Moritz Wagner
- Chris Welp
- Paul Zipser
