= Mexico at the 1936 Summer Olympics =

- IOC code: MEX
- NOC: Mexican Olympic Committee

in Berlin
- Competitors: 32 in 8 sports
- Flag bearer: Tirso Hernández
- Medals Ranked 28th: Gold 0 Silver 0 Bronze 3 Total 3

Summer Olympics appearances (overview)
- 1900; 1904–1920; 1924; 1928; 1932; 1936; 1948; 1952; 1956; 1960; 1964; 1968; 1972; 1976; 1980; 1984; 1988; 1992; 1996; 2000; 2004; 2008; 2012; 2016; 2020; 2024; 2028

Mexico competed at the 1936 Summer Olympics in Berlin, Germany. 32 competitors, all men, took part in 15 events in 8 sports.

== Medalists ==
Medal	Name	Sport	Event	Date
Bronze	Mexico men's national basketball team: Carlos Borja; Víctor Borja; Rodolfo Choperena; Luis de la Vega; Raúl Fernández; Andrés Gómez; Silvio Hernández; Francisco Martínez; Jesús Olmos; José Pamplona; Greer Skousen	Basketball	Men's tournament	14 August
Bronze	Fidel Ortiz	Boxing	Bantamweight	15 August
Bronze	Juan Gracia; Julio Mueller; Antonio Nava; Alberto Ramos	Polo	Men's tournament	6 August

== Athletics ==
Key

- Note–Ranks given for track events are within the athlete's heat only
- Q = Qualified for the next round
- q = Qualified for the next round as a fastest loser or, in field events, by position without achieving the qualifying target
- NR = National record
- N/A = Round not applicable for the event
- Bye = Athlete not required to compete in round

Track & road events

Athlete	Event	Heat		Quarterfinal		Semifinal		Final	
Athlete	Event	Result	Rank	Result	Rank	Result	Rank	Result	Rank
Pascual Gutiérrez	100 m	did not start		did not advance					
Valentín González	5000 m	Unknown	13	did not advance					
Valentín González	10,000 m	did not start		did not advance					

Field events

Athlete	Event	Qualification		Final	
Athlete	Event	Distance	Position	Distance	Position
Rigoberto Pérez	Men's pole vault	3:50	29	did not advance	
Pascual Gutiérrez	Men's long jump	7.15	Unknown	did not advance	

== Basketball ==
Summary

Team	Event	First round	First consolation round	Second round	Second consolation round	Third round	Quarterfinal	Semifinal	Final / BM	
Team	Event	Opposition Score	Opposition Score	Opposition Score	Opposition Score	Opposition Score	Opposition Score	Opposition Score	Opposition Score	Rank
Mexico men's	Men's tournament	Belgium; W 32–9	Bye	Philippines; L 30–32	Egypt; W 32–10	Japan; W 28–22	Italy; W 34–17	United States; L 10–25	Poland; W 26–12	3rd place, bronze medalist(s)

Team roster

Mexico men's national basketball team roster
Players
Coaches

Pos.	No.	Name	Age – Date of birth	Height	Club	Ctr.
	3	Carlos Borja	23 – 23 May 1913
	4	Víctor Borja	24 – 18 July 1912
	5	Rodolfo Choperena	31 – 11 February 1905
	9	Luis de la Vega	22 – 23 June 1914
	12	Raúl Fernández	30 – 17 September 1905
	13	Andrés Gómez	22 – 30 November 1913
	14	Silvio Hernández	27 – 31 December 1908
	19	Francisco Martínez	24 – 20 June 1912
	21	Jesús Olmos	26 – 20 July 1910
	22	José Pamplona	25 – 6 February 1911
	29	Greer Skousen	19 – 24 September 1916

Head coach

- (Mexico) Alfonso Rojo

Legend

- Club – describes last
  club before the competition
- Age – describes age
  on 7 August 1936

First round

7 August 1936
18:00

Report, p. 1078

Mexico	32–9	Belgium
Scoring by half: 21–2, 11–7

Tennis Courts, Court 4
Referees: V. Ugolini (ITA), E. Judd (GER), H. Hammes (GER)

Second round

9 August 1936
16:00

Report, p. 1079

Philippines	32–30	Mexico
Scoring by half: 17–19, 15–11

Tennis Courts, Court 1
Referees: V. J. Tobin (USA), H. Kalshaus (GER), F. Gornig (GER)

Second Consolation Round

10 August 1936
17:00

Report, p. 1080

Mexico	32–10	Egypt
Scoring by half: 16–8, 16–2

Tennis Courts, Court 1
Referees: M. Pfeuti (SUI), H. Kalshaus (GER), F. Cornik (GER)

Third round

11 August 1936
16:00

Report, p. 1081

Mexico	28–22	Japan
Scoring by half: 12–8, 16–14

Tennis Courts, Court 5
Referees: E. Powers (CAN), H. Emschermann (GER), K. Scheider (GER)

Quarterfinals

12 August 1936
17:00

Report, p. 1082

Mexico	34–17	Italy
Scoring by half: 20–7, 14–10

Tennis Courts, Court 5
Referees: E. Powers (CAN), F. Becker (GER), H. Hammes (GER)

Semifinals

13 August 1936
17:00

Report, p. 1082

United States	25–10	Mexico
Scoring by half: 13–2, 12–8

Tennis Courts, Stadium
Referees: T. Suvoong (CHN), H. Kalshaus (GER), K. Scheider (GER)

Bronze Medal Match

14 August 1936
17:00

Report, p. 1083

Mexico	26–12	Poland
Scoring by half: 23–8, 3–4

Tennis Courts, Court 3
Referees: M. Pfeuti (SUI), H. Emschermann (GER), K. Scheider (GER)

== Boxing ==
Athlete	Event	Round of 32	Round of 16	Quarterfinals	Semifinals	Final	
Athlete	Event	Opposition Result	Opposition Result	Opposition Result	Opposition Result	Opposition Result	Rank
Fidel Ortiz	Bantamweight	Lacelles (CAN); W	Barnes (GBR); W	Hannan (RSA); W	Wilson (USA); L	Cederberg (SWE); W	3rd place, bronze medalist(s)
Sabino Islas	Featherweight	Nicolaas (NED); L	did not advance				16
Lorenzo Delgado	Lightweight	Ågren (SWE); L	did not advance				17
Emilio Ballado	Welterweight	Andreassen (NOR); L	did not advance				17

== Diving ==
Athlete	Event	Final	
Athlete	Event	Points	Rank
Jesús Flores	10 m platform	73.28	24

== Fencing ==
Athlete	Event	Round 1			Round 2			Quarterfinals			Semifinals			Final		
Athlete	Event	MW	ML	Rank	MW	ML	Rank	MW	ML	Rank	MW	ML	Rank	MW	ML	Rank
Antonio Haro	Men's foil	did not start			Did not advance											
Antonio Haro	Men's épée	4	1	1Q	—N/a			6	2	1Q	2	6	8	did not advance		
Jose Martinez-Zorilla	Men's épée	5	3	6	—N/a			did not advance								
Antonio Haro	Men's sabre	did not start			—N/a			did not advance								
Jose Martinez-Zorilla	Men's sabre	did not start			—N/a			did not advance								

== Modern pentathlon ==
Athlete	Fencing (épée one touch)		Swimming (300 m freestyle)		Riding (cross-country)			Shooting (10 m air pistol)		Running (4000 m)		Total points	Final rank
Athlete	Results (W–D–L)	Rank	Time	Rank	Penalties	Time	Rank	Points	Rank	Time	Rank	Total points	Final rank
Humberto Anguiano	15–6–9	29	5:53.0	32	0	9:52.7	18	177	25	14:40.4	13	118.5	30
Luis Casíllas	19–4–17	17	6:58.6	37	0	9:16.0	6	162	35	19:20.9	39	134.5	35

== Polo ==
Team	Event	Group stage		Final / BM	
Team	Event	Opposition Score	Opposition Score	Opposition Score	Rank
Juan Gracia; Julio Mueller; Antonio Nava; Alberto Ramos	Men's	Great Britain (GBR); L 11-13	Argentina (ARG); L 5-15	Hungary (HUN); W 16-2	3rd place, bronze medalist(s)

== Shooting ==
Athlete	Event	Round 1		Round 2		Round 3		Round 4		Round 5		Final	
Athlete	Event	Points	Rank	Points	Rank	Points	Rank	Points	Rank	Points	Rank	Points	Rank
Carlos Acosta	25 m rapid fire pistol	Unknown		Did not advance									
Guillermo Huet	25 m rapid fire pistol	18	1	6	1	2	4	did not advance					
Alvaro García	50 m rifle, prone	—N/a										294	13
Antonio García	50 m rifle, prone	—N/a										288	44
Gustavo Huet	50 m rifle, prone	—N/a										296	7
