= Uruguay at the 1936 Summer Olympics =

- IOC code: URU
- NOC: Uruguayan Olympic Committee

in Berlin
- Competitors: 37 in 6 sports
- Medals: Gold 0 Silver 0 Bronze 0 Total 0

Summer Olympics appearances (overview)
- 1924; 1928; 1932; 1936; 1948; 1952; 1956; 1960; 1964; 1968; 1972; 1976; 1980; 1984; 1988; 1992; 1996; 2000; 2004; 2008; 2012; 2016; 2020; 2024

Uruguay competed at the 1936 Summer Olympics in Berlin, Germany. 37 competitors, all men, took part in 15 events in 6 sports.

== Basketball ==
- Gregorio Agós
- Humberto Bernasconi
- Rodolfo Braselli
- Prudencio de Pena
- Carlos Gabín
- Leandro Gómez Harley
- Alejandro González Roig
- Tabaré Quintans
- Víctor Latou Jaume

== Boxing ==
- Antonio Adipe
- Arquímedes Arrieta
- Juan Bregaliano
- Francisco Costanzo
- José Feans
- Alfredo Petrone
- Fidel Tricánico

== Fencing ==
Five fencers, all men, represented Uruguay in 1936.

Men's sabre

- París Rodríguez
- José Julián de la Fuente
- Carmelo Bentancur

Men's team sabre

- Carmelo Bentancur, José Julián de la Fuente, Hildemaro Lista, París Rodríguez, Jorge Rolando

== Rowing ==
Uruguay had eight rowers participate in three out of seven rowing events in 1936.

Men's single sculls

- Arquímedes Juanicó

Men's coxless pair

- Baldomiro Benquet
- Gabriel Benquet

Men's coxed four

- León Sánchez
- Juan Andrés Dutra
- Julio Flebbe
- Francisco Sunara
- Isidro Alonso (cox)

== Sailing ==
- Eugenio Lauz Santurio

== Water polo ==
- Alberto Batignani
- José Castro
- Julio Costemalle
- Francisco Figueroa
- Maximino García
- Enrique Pereira
- Hugo García
