= Raul Fernandez =

Raul Fernandez may refer to:

- Raúl Fernández (basketball) (1905–1982), Mexican basketball player
- Raul Fernandez (entrepreneur) (born 1967), American entrepreneur
- Raul Fernández Arrizabalaga (born 1972), Spanish Paralympic judoka and cyclist
- Raül Refree (born 1976), Spanish musician born Raül Fernandez Miró
- Raúl Fernández (long jumper) (born 1978), Spanish long jumper
- Raúl Fernández (footballer, born 1985), Peruvian footballer
- Raúl Fernández (footballer, born 1988), Spanish footballer
- Raúl Fernández (motorcyclist) (born 2000), Spanish motorcycle racer

== See also ==
- Raul Fernandex (Beyblade), fictional character from the anime and manga series Beyblade
