= Pilla =

Pilla is an Italian and Indian-origin surname. Notable persons with the surname include:

- Anthony Michael Pilla (1932–2021), American bishop
- Carmino de Pilla (born 1912), Brazilian basketball player
- Franca Pilla (born 1920), former Italian first lady
- Leopoldo Pilla (1805–1848), Italian geologist
