= 1936 in basketball =

The following are the basketball events of the year 1936 throughout the world.

== Tournaments ==
=== Men's tournaments ===
==== Olympics ====
- 1936 Olympics at Berlin

==== Amateur ====
- (United States) AAU
  - Globe Refiners (McPherson, KS) 47, Universal Pictures (Hollywood, CA) 35

== Births ==
- August 21 — Wilt Chamberlain, Hall of Fame center (died 1999)
