= Margiste =

Family name

Margiste is an Estonian surname. Notable people with the surname include:

- Aleksander Margiste (1908–1988), Estonian basketball player
- Anne Margiste (born 1942), Estonian actress
