= Skousen =

Skousen is a Danish surname. Notable people with the surname include:

- W. Cleon Skousen (1913–2006), American writer, defender of the John Birch Society
- Greer Skousen (1916–1988), Mexican-American basketball player
- Joel Skousen (born 1946), American writer and survivalist
- Mark Skousen (born 1947), American economist
- Royal Skousen (born 1945), American professor and Book of Mormon expert

== See also ==
- Skouson Harker, Canadian basketball player and coach
