= Nakae =

Nakae (written: 中江) is a Japanese surname. Notable people with the surname include:

- Nakae Chōmin (1847– 901), Japanese politician and journalist
- Daisuke Nakae (born 1985), Japanese professional wrestler, who is also known by his ring name Kenoh.
- Masato Nakae (1917–1998), United States Army soldier
- Shinji Nakae (1935–2007), Japanese voice actor and narrator
- Takao Nakae, (born 1913), Japanese basketball player
- Nakae Tōju (1608–1648), Japanese Confucian philosopher
- Yuji Nakae (born 1960), Japanese film director
- Yuri Nakae, Japanese singer
