= Eusebio Hernández =

Eusebio Hernández may refer to:

- Eusebio Hernández Pérez (1853–1933), Cuban eugenicist and obstetrician
- Eusebio Hernández (basketball) (1911–1997), Chilean basketball player
