= Carlos Borja =

Carlos Borja may refer to:

- Carlos Borja (footballer, born 1956), Bolivian football midfielder
- Carlos Borja (soccer, born 1988), American soccer defender
- Carlos Borja (basketball) (1913–1992), Mexican basketball player
- Carlos Castro Borja (born 1967), Salvadoran football player
