= Tennis Courts (Berlin) =

Sporting venue in Berlin, Germany

Coordinates: 52°31′2″N 13°14′58″E

The Tennis Courts are courts located at Olympiapark Berlin in Berlin, Germany. Located southwest of the Olympic Stadium, they hosted the basketball and the Épée fencing event for the 1936 Summer Olympics.
