= Enrico Castelli =

Italian basketball player (1909–1983)

Olimpia Milano

Personal information
- Born: 22 February 1909 Milan
- Died: 21 September 1983 (aged 74) Milan

Career information
- Playing career: 1936–1939

Enrico Castelli (February 22, 1909 – September 21, 1983) was an Italian basketball player who competed in the 1936 Summer Olympics. He was part of the Italian basketball team, which finished seventh in the Olympic tournament. He played three matches.
