= Rashad Shafshak =

Egyptian basketball player

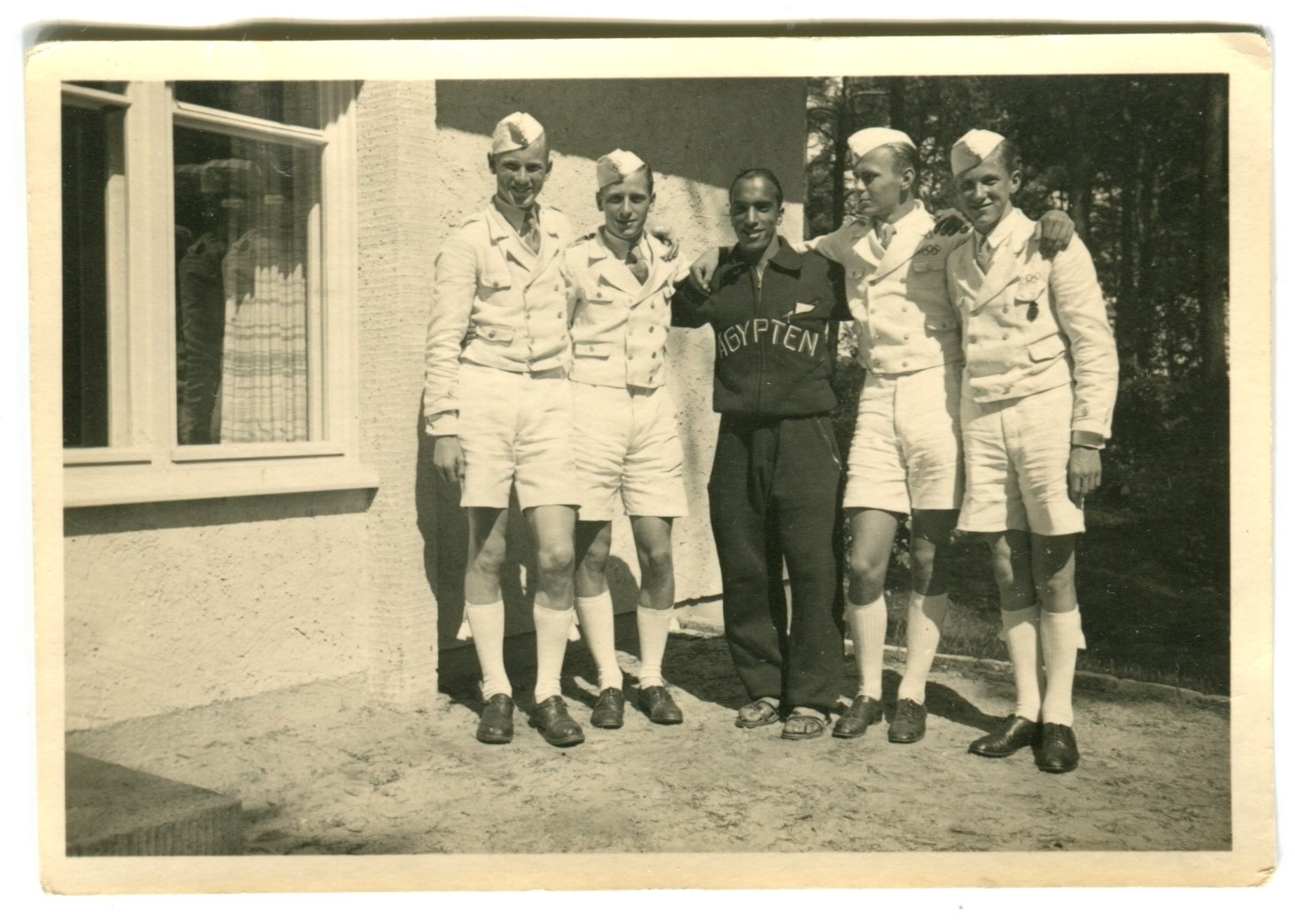
- Rashad Shafshak in the Olymic Village in Berlin 1936

Personal information
- Full name: Mohamed Rashid Rashad Shafshak
- Nationality: Egyptian
- Born: 26 November 1910

Sport
- Sport: Basketball

Mohamed Rashid Rashad Shafshak (Arabic: محمد راشد رشاد شفشق; born 26 November 1910, date of death unknown) was an Egyptian basketball player. He competed in the men's tournament at the 1936 Summer Olympics.
