= Zenon Różycki =

Polish basketball player (1913–1992)

Personal information
- Born: December 18, 1913; Poznań, Poland
- Died: March 31, 1992 (aged 78); Wilsonville, OR, United States

Career information
- College: Adam Mickiewicz University
- Playing career: 1930–1939

Career history
- 1930–1932: AZS Poznań
- 1933–1934: KPW Poznań
- 1937–1938: AZS Poznań

Career highlights
- 4× Polish Champion (1930, 1931, 1932, 1937); 2× Polish Runner-Up (1934, 1938); Silver medalist, Polish Handball Championship (1935)

Zenon Adam Różycki (December 18, 1913 – March 31, 1992) was a Polish basketball player who competed in the 1936 Summer Olympics.

He was born in Poznań.

Różycki was part of the Polish basketball team, which finished fourth in the 1936 Olympic tournament. He played all six matches.
