= Liu Yunchang =

Chinese basketball player

Liu Yunchang (Chinese: 劉 雲章; 20 February 1912 in Anguo, Hebei, China – 17 January 1993 in Beijing, China) was a Chinese basketball player who competed in the 1936 Summer Olympics. He was part of the Chinese basketball team, which was eliminated in the second round of the Olympic tournament. He played one match. After his basketball career, he became a politician.
