= Carmelo Bentancur =

Uruguayan fencer

Personal information
- Born: July 4, 1899 Durazno, Uruguay

Sport
- Sport: Fencing

Carmelo Bentancur (born July 4, 1899, date of death unknown) was born in Durazno, Uruguay. He enlisted in the army with his brother, Cecilio, and served as a pilot but after an air accident he joined the cavalry.

Bentancur was several times the national fencing champion and was the Uruguayan representative in the 1936 Summer Olympics in Berlin.
