= José Carlos Godoy =

Peruvian basketball player (1911–1988)

José Carlos Godoy Riofrio (born 19 December 1911 in Lima, Peru; died 13 February 1988 in Lima, Peru) was a Peruvian basketball player who competed in the 1936 Summer Olympics. He was part of the Peruvian basketball team, which finished eighth in the Olympic tournament. He played one match. His brother, Miguel, also competed in the same event.
