= Chuck Chapman =

Canadian basketball player

Personal information
- Born: April 21, 1911 Vancouver, British Columbia
- Died: March 6, 2002 (aged 90) Victoria, British Columbia
Medal record
Men's basketball
Silver medal – second place	1936 Berlin	Team competition

Charles Winston Chapman (April 21, 1911 – March 6, 2002) was a Canadian basketball player who competed in the 1936 Summer Olympics. Born in Vancouver, he played in four games, including the final, for the Canadian basketball team which won the silver medal. He was the older brother of Art Chapman, who also played at the Berlin Games.
