= Josef Moc =

Czech basketball player

Medal record

Representing Czechoslovakia

Men's basketball

European Championships
Bronze medal – third place	1935 Switzerland	Team competition

Josef Moc (January 22, 1908, Mladá Boleslav – 13 July 1999, Prague) was a Czechoslovak basketball player who competed for Czechoslovakia in the 1936 Summer Olympics.

In 1936 he was a member of the Czechoslovak basketball team, which was eliminated in the third round of the Olympic tournament. He played one match.
