= Ian Allison (basketball) =

Canadian basketball player (1909–1990)

Medal record

Men's basketball
Silver medal – second place	1936 Berlin	Team competition

Ian Alistar Allison (July 26, 1909 – August 4, 1990) was a Canadian basketball player who competed in the 1936 Summer Olympics. His is the only Canadian basketball team to date to win a medal at the Olympics, a silver and also the last to win a team medal. He played all six matches including the final. He was high scorer with 4 points in Canada's 19–8 loss to the Americans.

== Early life and working life ==
Allison was born in Greenock, Scotland and, while still young, migrated to Canada with his family. They lived across from Walkerville Collegiate Institute, the school he attended for high school. He then attended Assumption College and finally University of Toronto where his team won a championship. After graduation, he went back to Walkerville to work as a teacher. A year later he married one of the secretaries of the school - Jean Alberta Reid, and eventually the couple had two daughters - Heather and Janey. Allison retired from teaching in 1973. He is an inductee into the Windsor Essex Sports Hall of Fame.
