= Gordon Aitchison =

Canadian basketball player (1909–1990)

Personal information
- Born: June 14, 1909 North Bay, Ontario, Canada
- Died: January 6, 1990 (aged 80) Windsor, Ontario, Canada
Medal record
Men's basketball
Silver medal – second place	1936 Berlin	Team competition

Gordon Aitchison (June 14, 1909 – January 6, 1990) was a Canadian basketball player who competed in the 1936 Summer Olympics. He died at the age of 80 in 1990.

Born in North Bay, Ontario, he was part of the Canadian basketball team, which won the silver medal. He played all six matches including the final.
