= James Stewart (basketball) =

Canadian basketball player

Olympic medal record

Men's basketball
Silver medal – second place	1936 Berlin	Team competition

James Stewart (July 10, 1910 – August 12, 1990) was a Canadian basketball player, born in Walkerville, Ontario, who competed in the 1936 Summer Olympics.

He was the captain of the Canadian basketball team, which won the silver medal. He played four matches including the final.
