= Edward Risk Allah =

Egyptian basketball player (born 1913)

Personal information
- Nationality: Egyptian
- Born: 21 August 1913; Anglo-Egyptian Sudan

Sport
- Sport: Basketball

Edward Risk Allah (Arabic: إدوارد رزق‌ الله; born 21 August 1913) was an Egyptian basketball player. He competed in the men's tournament at the 1936 Summer Olympics.
