= Sergio Paganella =

Italian basketball player (1911–1992)

Medal record

Representing Italy

Men's basketball

European Championships
Silver medal – second place	1937 Latvia	Team competition

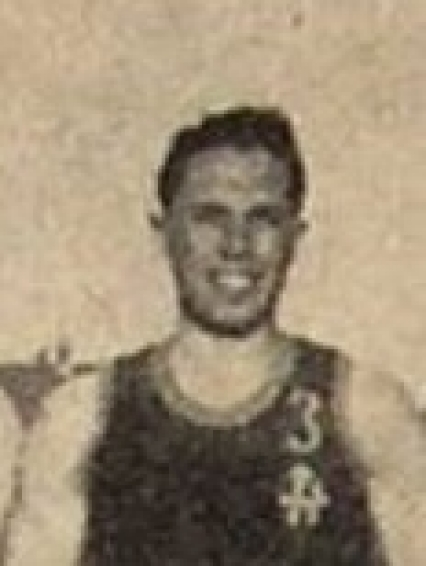
Sergio Paganella

Sergio Paganella (August 1, 1911 – June 2, 1992) was an Italian basketball player who competed in the 1936 Summer Olympics.

He was born in Mantua (Lombardy) and died in Milan.

Paganella was part of the Italian basketball team, which finished seventh in the Olympic tournament. He played four matches.
