= Art Chapman (basketball) =

Canadian basketball player

Personal information
- Born: October 28, 1912 Victoria, British Columbia, Canada
- Died: February 3, 1986 (aged 73) Nanaimo, British Columbia, Canada
Medal record
Men's basketball
Olympic Games
Silver medal – second place	1936 Berlin	Team competition

Arthur St. Clair Chapman (October 28, 1912 – February 3, 1986) was a Canadian basketball player who competed in the 1936 Summer Olympics.

Born in Victoria, British Columbia, Chapman was part of the Canadian basketball team which won the silver medal. He played all six matches including the final. He was the younger brother of Chuck Chapman, who also participated at the Berlin Games. He died in Nanaimo, British Columbia.
