= Ewaryst Łój =

Polish basketball player (1912–1973)

Personal information
- Nationality: Polish
- Born: 30 August 1912; Strzelno, Poland
- Died: 4 July 1973 (aged 60); Poznań, Poland

Sport
- Sport: Basketball

Ewaryst Antoni Łój (August 30, 1912 in Strzelno – July 4, 1973 in Poznań) was a Polish basketball player who competed in the 1936 Summer Olympics.

He was part of the Polish basketball team which finished fourth in the Olympic tournament. He played in all six matches.
