= Edward Dawson (basketball) =

Canadian basketball player (1907–1998)

Personal information
- Born: October 10, 1907 Windsor, Ontario, Canada
- Died: October 24, 1968 (aged 61)
Medal record
Men's basketball
| Silver medal – second place | 1936 Berlin | Team competition |

Edward John Dawson (October 10, 1907 – October 24, 1968) was a Canadian basketball player who competed in the 1936 Summer Olympics.

Dawson was part of the Canadian basketball team, which won the silver medal. He played three matches.
