= Malcolm Wiseman =

Canadian basketball player

Olympic medal record

Men's basketball
Silver medal – second place	1936 Berlin	Team competition

Malcolm Edward "Red" Wiseman (July 12, 1913 – April 11, 1993) was a Canadian basketball player, born in Winnipeg, who competed in the 1936 Summer Olympics.

He was part of the Canadian basketball team, which won the silver medal. He played all six matches including the final.
