= Willy Dasso =

Peruvian basketball player (1917–1990)

Guillermo Ignacio Nicolás "Willy" Dasso Drago (10 January 1917 in Lima – 10 November 1990 in Lima) was a Peruvian basketball player who competed in the 1936 Summer Olympics. He was part of the Peruvian basketball team, which finished eighth in the Olympic tournament. He played both matches.
