= Andrzej Pluciński =

Polish basketball player (1915–1963)

Andrzej Pluciński (13 November 1915 in Kraków – 27 August 1963) was a Polish basketball player, who competed in the 1936 Summer Olympics.

He was part of the Polish basketball team, which finished fourth in the Olympic tournament. He played in all six matches.
