= Gamal El-Din Sabri =

Egyptian basketball player (born 1915)

Personal information
- Nationality: Egyptian
- Born: 21 June 1915; Cairo, Egypt

Sport
- Sport: Basketball

Gamal El-Din Sabri (Arabic: جمال الدين صبري; born 21 June 1915, date of death unknown) was an Egyptian basketball player. He competed in the men's tournament at the 1936 Summer Olympics.
