= Ladislav Prokop =

Czech basketball player

Personal information
- Nationality: Czech
- Born: 6 June 1917

Sport
- Sport: Basketball

Ladislav Prokop (born 9 June 1917, date of death unknown) was a Czech basketball player. He competed in the men's tournament at the 1936 Summer Olympics.
