= Emilio Giassetti =

Italian basketball player (1906–1957)

Medal record

Representing Italy

Men's basketball

European Championships
Silver medal – second place	1937 Latvia	Team competition

Emilio Giassetti (February 11, 1906 – July 4, 1957) was an Italian basketball player who competed in the 1936 Summer Olympics. He was born in Trieste. Giassetti was part of the Italian basketball team that finished seventh in the Olympic tournament. He played four matches.
