= Edward Szostak =

Polish basketball player (1911–1990)

Personal information
- Nationality: Polish
- Born: 12 September 1911 Kraków, Austria-Hungary
- Died: 10 October 1990 (aged 79) Kraków, Poland

Sport
- Sport: Basketball

Edward Szostak (September 12, 1911 in Kraków – October 10, 1990 in Kraków) was a Polish basketball player who competed in the 1936 Summer Olympics.

He was part of the Polish basketball team, which finished fourth in the Olympic tournament. He played in two matches.
