= Richard Fröhlich =

German basketball player (born 1986)

Personal information
- Born: 5 June 1986 (age 38); Stade, Germany
- Listed height: 6 ft 9 in (2.06 m)
- Listed weight: 240 lb (109 kg)

Career information
- High school: Realschule Oldendorf (Oldendorf, Germany)
- College: Citrus College (2006–2008); UTSA (2008–2010)
- NBA draft: 2010: undrafted
- Playing career: 2003–present
- Position: Power forward

Career history
- 2003–2004: VfL Stade
- 2005: Cuxhaven BasCats
- 2006: VfL Stade
- 2010–2011: Cuxhaven BasCats
- 2011–2012: Uni-Riesen Leipzig
- 2012–2013: BG Leitershofen
- 2013: Otto Baskets Magdeburg

Richard Georg Fröhlich (born 5 June 1986) is a German professional basketball player. He grew up in a small town called Oldendorf. The son of Georg and Vineta Fröhlich, he has 4 sisters; one of them, Linda Fröhlich, is considered the best women's player in Germany.

Fröhlich, also called "Richie", played from 2006 to 2008 for head coach Rick Croy at Citrus College in Glendora, California. As a freshman, he averaged 4.1 points and 3.3 rebounds per game, shot 55.2 percent from the floor, and had 11 steals and seven blocks as a freshman. During Fröhlich's second year at Citrus College he averaged 6.9 points and 4.4 rebounds per game, blocked 22 shots and shot 55.9 percent from the field. He helped his team to a 35–1 record, the Western State Conference title, and the California Community College Athletic Association (CCCAA) championship.

For his junior year, Fröhlich transferred to the University of Texas San Antonio, playing for former NBA player Brooks James Thompson. Fröhlich averaged 2.6 points and 2.3 rebounds in just 7.3 min a game. The Roadrunners made it to the 2009 State Farm Southland Conference Tournament Championship Game. Fröhlich averaged 2.2 points per game and grabbed 1.9 rebounds in 8.8 minutes during his senior season. His team went to the 2010 State Farm Southland Conference Tournament.

For the 2010–2011 season Fröhlich signed his first professional contract with the Cuxhaven Bascats in the Basketball Bundesliga where he scored 5.2 points per game and had 3.e rebounds in 12 minutes. He scored 14 points in a game against Saar-Pfalz.

For the 2011–2012 season Fröhlich signed with the Uni-Riesen Leipzig.
