= Wang Hongbin =

Chinese basketball player

Wang Hongbin (Chinese: 王 鴻斌, born 16 February 1915, date of death unknown) was a Chinese basketball player who competed in the 1936 Summer Olympics.

He was part of the Chinese basketball team, which was eliminated in the second round of the Olympic tournament. He played three matches.
