= Egidio Premiani =

Italian basketball player (1909–2002)

Egidio Premiani (16 February 1909 – 18 May 2002) was an Italian basketball player who competed in the 1936 Summer Olympics. He was born in Trieste. Premiani was part of the Italian basketball team, which finished seventh in the Olympic tournament. He played all five matches.
