= Pascual Gutiérrez =

Mexican long jumper

Personal information
- Nationality: Mexican
- Born: 29 November 1914
- Died: 26 March 1987 (aged 72)

Sport
- Sport: Athletics
- Event: Long jump

Pascual Gutiérrez (29 November 1914 – 26 March 1987) was a Mexican athlete. He competed in the men's long jump at the 1936 Summer Olympics.
