= Julio César Costemalle =

Uruguayan water polo player (1914–1960s)

Personal information
- Born: 3 May 1914 Montevideo, Uruguay
- Died: between 1961 and 1963

Sport
- Sport: Water polo

Julio César Costemalle (3 May 1914 – between 1961 and 1963) was a Uruguayan water polo player. He competed at the 1936 Summer Olympics and the 1948 Summer Olympics. Costemalle died in Paraguay between 1961 and 1963.
