= Janusz Patrzykont =

Polish basketball player (1912–1982)

Janusz Stanisław Patrzykont (9 May 1912 in Kramsk – 9 December 1982 in Poznań) was a Polish basketball player who competed in the 1936 Summer Olympics.

He was part of the Polish basketball team, which finished fourth in the Olympic tournament. He played three matches.
