= Alois Dvořáček =

Czech basketball player

Alois Dvořáček (January 26, 1909 – ?) was a Czech basketball player who competed for Czechoslovakia in the 1936 Summer Olympics.

In 1936 he was a member of the Czechoslovak basketball team, which was eliminated in the third round of the Olympic tournament. He played one match.
