= Gino Basso =

Italian basketball player (born 1914)

Gino Basso (born September 14, 1914) was an Italian basketball player who competed in the 1936 Summer Olympics.

He was part of the Italian basketball team, which finished seventh in the Olympic tournament. He played two matches.
