= Jakub Kopf =

Polish basketball player (1915–1983)

Personal information
- Nationality: Polish
- Born: 13 March 1915; Kraków, Poland
- Died: 2 June 1983 (aged 68); Kraków, Poland

Sport
- Sport: Basketball

Jakub Józef Kopf or Kopowski (March 13, 1915 in Kraków – June 2, 1983 in Kraków) was a Polish basketball player who competed in the 1936 Summer Olympics.

He was part of the Polish basketball team, which finished fourth in the Olympic tournament. He played in two matches.
