= Manuel Arce =

Peruvian basketball player

Personal information
- Born: 25 December 1909
- Died: 31 March 1984 (aged 74)

Manuel Oswaldo Arce Raby (December 25, 1909 – March 31, 1984) was a Peruvian basketball player who competed in the 1936 Summer Olympics. He was part of the Peruvian basketball team, which finished eighth in the Olympic tournament. He played both matches.
