= Sadri Usluoğlu =

Turkish basketball player

Personal information
- Nationality: Turkish
- Born: 23 January 1908 Basra, Iraq
- Died: 15 March 1987 Istanbul, Turkey

Sport
- Sport: Basketball, Football

Sadri Usluoğlu (or Sadri Usuoğlu; 23 January 1908 – 15 March 1987) was a Turkish basketball and football player. He competed in the men's tournament at the 1936 Summer Olympics. He was Beşiktaş 9th manager between 1952 and 1953.
