= Vítězslav Hloušek =

Czech basketball player

Personal information
- Nationality: Czech
- Born: 31 October 1914
- Died: 31 October 1987 (aged 73)

Sport
- Sport: Basketball

Vítězslav Hloušek (31 October 1914 – 31 October 1987) was a Czech basketball player. He competed in the men's tournament at the 1936 Summer Olympics.
