= Luis Jacob (basketball) =

Peruvian basketball player

Personal information
- Born: 13 August 1912 Lima, Peru

Luis Jacob Robin (born 13 August 1912, date of death unknown) was a Peruvian basketball player. He competed in the 1936 Summer Olympics.
