= Baiano (basketball) =

Brazilian basketball player

Personal information
- Full name: Aluízio Freire Ramos Accioly Neto
- Born: 27 September 1912; Rio de Janeiro, Brazil
- Died: 17 July 1956 (aged 43); Rio de Janeiro, Brazil

Sport
- Sport: Basketball

Aluízio Freire Ramos Accioly Neto (27 September 1912 – 17 July 1956), commonly known as Baiano, was a Brazilian basketball player. He competed in the men's tournament at the 1936 Summer Olympics.
