= Miguel Godoy (basketball) =

Peruvian basketball player (1907–2002)

Personal information
- Born: 15 March 1907 Chorrillos, Peru
- Died: 26 March 2002 (aged 95) Lima, Peru

Miguel Joaquín Godoy Riofrio (15 March 1907 – 26 March 2002) was a Peruvian basketball player. He competed in the 1936 Summer Olympics. His brother, José Carlos, also competed in the same event.
