= Galeazzo Dondi =

Italian basketball player (1915–2004)

Personal information
- Born: 19 March 1915 Bologna, Italy
- Died: 22 October 2004 (aged 89) Bologna, Italy

Galeazzo Dondi (19 March 1915 – 22 October 2004) was an Italian basketball player. He competed in the 1936 Summer Olympics. Dondi died on 22 October 2004, at the age of 89.
