= Satoshi Matsui =

Japanese basketball player

Personal information
- Nationality: Japanese
- Born: 12 March 1915
- Died: 1 August 1995 (aged 80)

Sport
- Sport: Basketball

Satoshi Matsui (12 March 1915 – 1 August 1995) was a Japanese basketball player. He competed in the men's tournament at the 1936 Summer Olympics. He later served as vice president of the Japan Basketball Association.
