= Adolfo Mazzini =

Italian basketball player (1909–2006)

Personal information
- Born: 1 September 1909 Macerata, Italy
- Died: 16 February 2006 (aged 96)

Adolfo Mazzini (1 September 1909 – 16 February 2006) was an Italian basketball player. He competed in the 1936 Summer Olympics.
