= František Picek =

Czech basketball player

Personal information
- Nationality: Czech
- Born: 13 April 1912; Prague, Austria-Hungary
- Died: 21 November 2007 (aged 95)

Sport
- Sport: Basketball

František Picek (13 April 1912 – 21 November 2007) was a Czech basketball player. He competed in the men's tournament at the 1936 Summer Olympics.
