= Luis Ibaseta =

Chilean basketball player (1913–1987)

Personal information
- Born: 31 December 1913 Valparaíso, Chile
- Died: 28 November 1987 (aged 73) Viña del Mar, Chile

Luis Mario Ibaseta Cobo (31 December 1913 – 28 November 1987) was a Chilean basketball player. He competed in the 1936 Summer Olympics.
