= Donald Piper (basketball) =

American basketball player (1911–1963)

Medal record

Men's basketball

Representing United States

Olympic Games
Gold medal – first place	1936 Berlin	Team competition

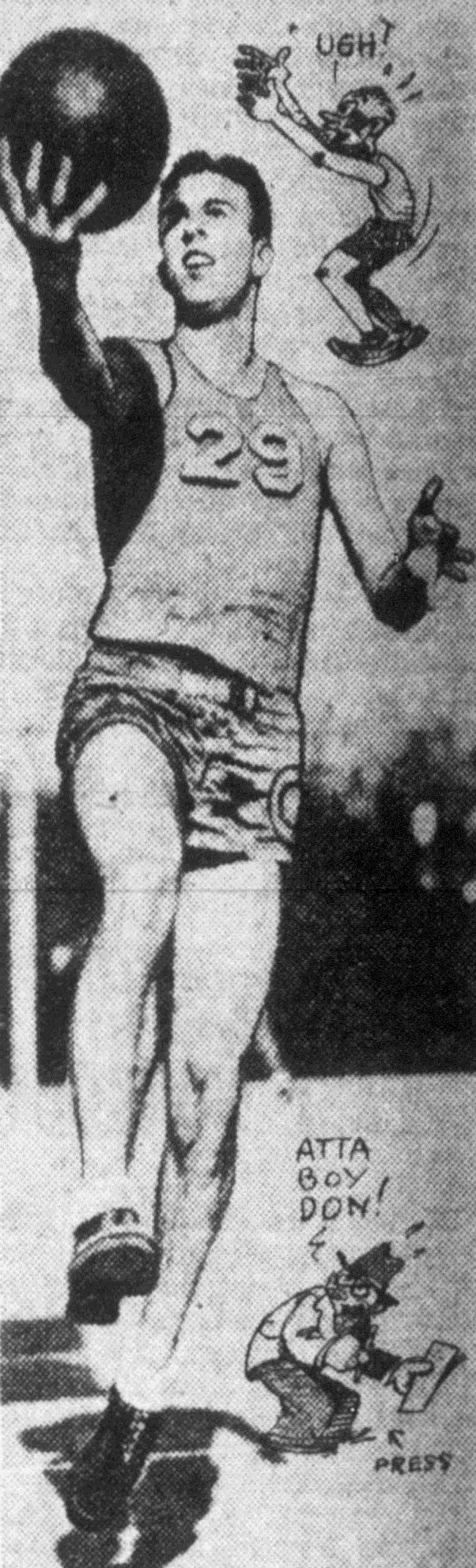
Piper, circa 1933

Donald Arthur Piper (March 5, 1911 – March 25, 1963) was an American basketball player who competed in the 1936 Summer Olympics.

He was part of the American basketball team, which won the gold medal. He played two matches.

He played college basketball at UCLA.
