= Uichi Munakata =

Japanese basketball player

Personal information
- Nationality: Japanese
- Born: 26 November 1915

Sport
- Sport: Basketball

Uichi Munakata (宗像 卯一, Uichi Munakata, born 26 November 1915) was a Japanese basketball player. He competed in the men's tournament at the 1936 Summer Olympics.
