= Vladimir Kärk =

Estonian basketball player

Personal information
- Born: 19 March 1915 Tallinn, Governorate of Estonia, Russian Empire
- Died: 23 July 1998 (aged 83) Royal Oak, Michigan, United States

Vladimir Kärk (19 March 1915 – 23 July 1998) was an Estonian basketball player. He competed in the 1936 Summer Olympics.
