= Pavão (basketball) =

Brazilian basketball player (born 1917)

Ary dos Santos Furtado
Personal information
- Born: 6 September 1917; Aimores, Brazil

Sport
- Sport: Basketball

Ary "Pavão" dos Santos Furtado, also commonly known as Pavão (born 6 September 1917, date of death unknown), was a Brazilian basketball player. He competed in the men's tournament at the 1936 Summer Olympics. Pavao is deceased.
