= Masayasu Maeda =

Japanese basketball player (born 1914)

Personal information
- Nationality: Japanese
- Born: 10 March 1914

Sport
- Sport: Basketball

Masayasu Maeda (born 10 March 1914, date of death unknown) was a Japanese basketball player. He competed in the men's tournament at the 1936 Summer Olympics.
