= František Hájek =

Czech basketball player

Personal information
- Nationality: Czech
- Born: 31 October 1915 Prague, Austria-Hungary
- Died: 7 January 2001 (aged 85)

Sport
- Sport: Basketball

František Hájek (31 October 1915 – 7 January 2001) was a Czech basketball player. He competed in the men's tournament at the 1936 Summer Olympics.
