= Augusto Carvacho =

Chilean basketball player

Personal information
- Born: 18 March 1914 Fabero, León, Spain
- Died: 21 December 2006 (aged 92)

César Augusto Carvacho Solar (18 March 1914 – 21 December 2006) was a Chilean basketball player. He competed in the 1936 Summer Olympics.
