= Amador Obordo =

Filipino basketball player

Personal information
- Nationality: Filipino
- Born: February 14, 1912 Sapian, Capiz, Philippine Islands
- Died: February 12, 1945 (aged 32) Paco, Manila, Philippine Commonwealth

Sport
- Sport: Basketball

Amador O. Obordo (February 14, 1912 – February 12, 1945) was a Filipino basketball player. He competed in the men's tournament at the 1936 Summer Olympics. He was killed during World War II.
