= Jesús Marzán =

Filipino basketball player

Personal information
- Born: August 2, 1915 Sanchez-Mira, Cagayan, Philippine Islands
- Died: October 22, 1969 (aged 54) Manila, Philippines

Career information
- College: San Beda

Jesús E. Marzán (August 2, 1915 – October 22, 1969) was a Filipino basketball player. He competed in the men's tournament at the 1936 Summer Olympics.

Marzan was part of the San Beda College NCAA champion basketball team in 1930s. Along with Charles Borck, Angel de la Paz and Antonio Carillo, the four of them were called "the Four Horsemen of the Apocalypse". He died of a heart attack.
