= Silvio Hernández =

Mexican basketball player (1908–1984)

Olympic medal record

Men's basketball
Bronze medal – third place	1936 Berlin	Team competition

Silvio Hernández del Valle (December 31, 1908 – March 20, 1984) was a Mexican basketball player who competed in the 1936 Summer Olympics. Born in Veracruz, he was part of the Mexican basketball team, which won the bronze medal. He played in two matches.
