= Georges Carrier =

French basketball player

Personal information
- Nationality: French
- Born: 4 September 1910; Paris, France
- Died: 5 May 1993 (aged 82)

Sport
- Sport: Basketball

Georges Carrier (4 September 1910 – 5 May 1993) was a French basketball player. He competed in the men's tournament at the 1936 Summer Olympics.
