= Luis Carrasco (basketball) =

Chilean basketball player

Personal information
- Born: 18 September 1915 Santiago, Chile

Luis Carrasco (born 18 September 1915; date of death unknown) was a Chilean basketball player. He competed in the 1936 Summer Olympics.
