= Francis Johnson (basketball) =

American basketball player (1910–1997)

Medal record

Men's basketball

Representing the United States

Olympic Games
Gold medal – first place	1936 Berlin	Team competition

Francis Lee Johnson (August 5, 1910 – April 18, 1997) was an American basketball player who competed in the 1936 Summer Olympics in Berlin. He was born and raised in Hartford, Kansas and is a graduate of Hartford High School.

He was part of the American basketball team, which won the gold medal. He played two matches including the final.

He played college basketball at Municipal University of Wichita (now known as Wichita State University) where his brother Gene was head coach from 1928–1933.
