= Ludvík Dvořáček =

Czech basketball player

Personal information
- Nationality: Czech
- Born: 6 August 1910
- Died: 23 January 1963 (aged 52)

Sport
- Sport: Basketball

Ludvík Dvořáček (6 August 1910 – 23 January 1963) was a Czech basketball player. He competed in the men's tournament at the 1936 Summer Olympics.
