= Remo Piana =

Italian basketball player (1908–1943)

Personal information
- Born: 6 September 1908 Rome, Italy
- Died: 7 April 1943 (aged 34) Soviet Union

Remo Piana (6 September 1908 – 7 April 1943) was an Italian basketball player. He competed in the 1936 Summer Olympics.
