= Antonio Flecha =

Peruvian basketball player

Personal information
- Born: 14 April 1912 Lima, Peru
- Died: 6 January 1967 (aged 54) Lima, Peru

Antonio Narciso Flecha Álvarez (14 April 1912 – 6 January 1967) was a Peruvian basketball player. He competed in the 1936 Summer Olympics.
