= Erich Altosaar =

Estonian basketball player (1908–1941)

Personal information
- Born: 14 August 1908 Tallinn, Governorate of Estonia, Russian Empire
- Died: 11 October 1941 (aged 33) Kirov Oblast, Russian SFSR, Soviet Union
- Height: 187 cm (6 ft 2 in)

Sport
- Sport: Basketball
- Club: Tallinna Võitleja, Kalev Tallinn

Erich Altosaar (14 August 1908 – 11 October 1941) was an Estonian basketball player. He was part of the national team that placed ninth at the 1936 Summer Olympics, where he also served as the Olympic flag bearer for Estonia.

Altosaar graduated from a technical school in 1925, and competed for Tallinna Võitleja in 1922–27. He held national titles in volleyball (1927, 1929, 1931, 1933 and 1935–39), basketball (1927, 1930–31 and 1941) and association football (1930). In the latter sport he was playing for JK Tallinna Kalev when that club won the 1930 Estonian Football Championship. Altosaar played 16 international basketball matches for Estonia, and captained the national team at EuroBasket 1939, where it placed fifth. After 1934 he worked as an accountant and police officer. Following the Soviet annexation of Estonia, he was arrested in 1941 on charge of anti-Soviet activity and, on a decision of the NKVD, shot in a Gulag camp.
