= Eduardo Kapstein =

Chilean basketball player (1914–1997)

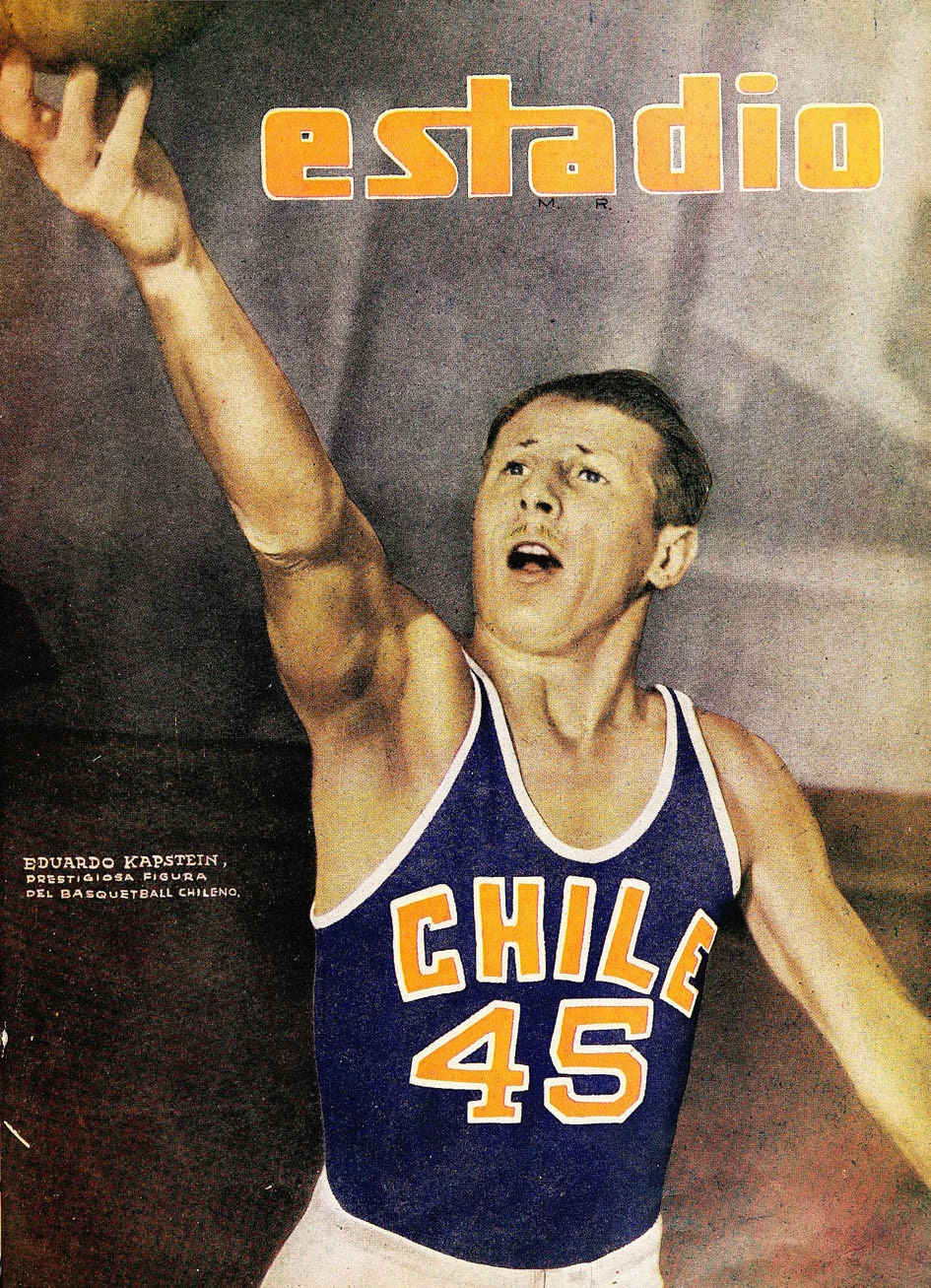

Personal information
- Born: 28 March 1914 Santiago, Chile
- Died: 13 February 1997 (aged 82)

Eduardo Guillermo "Lalo" Kapstein Suckel (28 March 1914 – 13 February 1997) was a Chilean basketball player. He competed in the 1936 Summer Olympics and the 1948 Summer Olympics.
