= Víctor Borja =

Mexican basketball player (1912–1954)

Olympic medal record

Representing Mexico

Men's basketball
Bronze medal – third place	1936 Berlin	National team

Víctor Hugo Borja Morca (18 July 1912 – 8 November 1954) was a Mexican basketball player. He competed in the 1936 Summer Olympics.

== Career ==
Born in Guadalajara, Borja was part of the Mexican basketball team, which won the bronze medal in Berlin. He played all seven matches. Later in life he entered the pharmaceutical business and committed suicide in 1954 after his daughter, a diver, died of an infection.
