= Seikyu Ri =

Korean basketball player (1911–2002)

Personal information
- Nationality: Korean
- Born: 1 January 1911; Cheonan, Korea
- Died: 14 October 2002 (aged 91); Seoul, South Korea

Sport
- Sport: Basketball

Seikyu Ri, or Lee Seong-Gu, (1 January 1911 – 14 October 2002) was a Korean basketball player. He competed in the men's tournament at the 1936 Summer Olympics, representing Japan.
