= Humberto Bernasconi =

Uruguayan basketball player

Humberto Bernasconi Galvart (born 17 December 1910, date of death unknown) was an Uruguayan basketball player. He competed in the 1936 Summer Olympics. He was born in Montevideo.
