= Karel Kuhn =

Czech basketball player

Personal information
- Nationality: Czech
- Born: 14 September 1915
- Died: 29 June 1981 (aged 65)

Sport
- Sport: Basketball

Karel Kuhn (14 September 1915 – 29 June 1981) was a Czech basketball player. He competed in the men's tournament at the 1936 Summer Olympics.
