= Waldemar Gonçalves =

Brazilian basketball player (1906–1963)

Personal information
- Born: 15 January 1906; Rio de Janeiro, Brazil
- Died: May 1963 (aged 57)

Sport
- Sport: Basketball

Waldemar "Coroa" Gonçalves, also commonly known as Coroa (15 January 1906 – May 1963) was a Brazilian basketball player. He competed in the men's tournament at the 1936 Summer Olympics.
