= José González (basketball) =

Chilean basketball player (1914–??)

Personal information
- Born: 3 August 1914 Valparaíso, Chile

José González (born 3 August 1914; date of death unknown) was a Chilean basketball player. He competed in the 1936 Summer Olympics.
