= Art Mollner =

American basketball player (1912–1995)

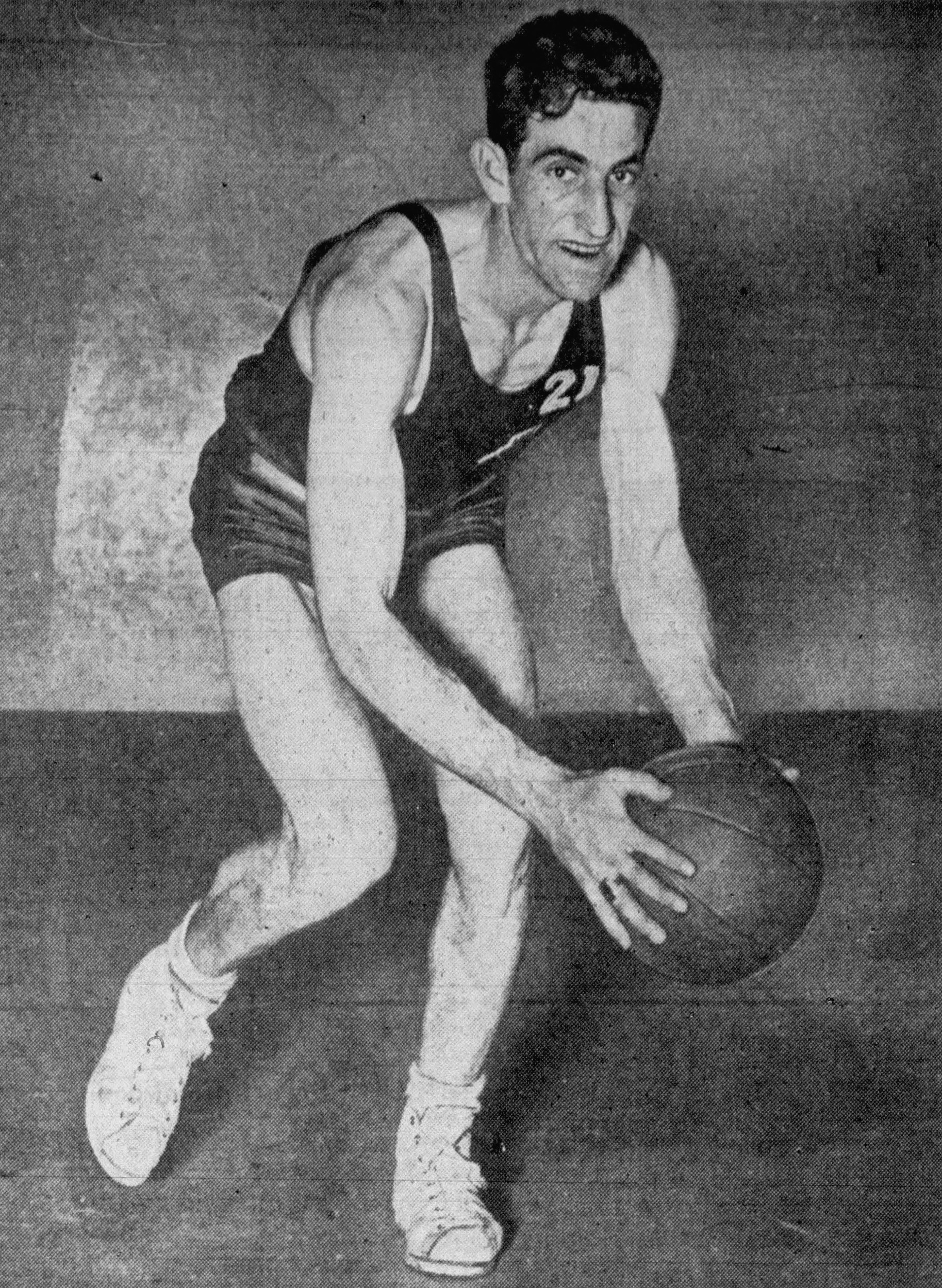
- Mollner, circa 1942

Medal record

Men's basketball

Representing the United States

Olympic Games
Gold medal – first place	1936 Berlin	Team competition

Arthur Owen Mollner (December 20, 1912 – March 16, 1995) was an American basketball player who competed in the 1936 Summer Olympics.

Born in Saranac Lake, New York, he was part of the American basketball team, which won the gold medal. He played two matches.

Later, Mollner coached Los Angeles in the AAU National Industrial Basketball League in 1950-1951 and 1951-1952.
