= Américo Montanarini =

Brazilian basketball player

Personal information
- Born: 11 August 1917; São Paulo, Brazil
- Died: 14 July 1994 (aged 76); São Paulo, Brazil

Sport
- Sport: Basketball

Américo Montanarini (11 August 1917 – 14 July 1994) was a Brazilian basketball player. He competed in the men's tournament at the 1936 Summer Olympics.
