= Fernand Bergmann =

Swiss basketball player

Personal information
- Nationality: Swiss
- Born: 12 September 1904

Sport
- Sport: Basketball

Fernand Bergmann (12 September 1904 - 4 July 1993) was a Swiss basketball player. He competed in the men's tournament at the 1936 Summer Olympics.
