= Luis Ignacio de la Vega =

Mexican basketball player (1914–1974)

Olympic medal record

Men's basketball
Bronze medal – third place	1936 Berlin	Team competition

Luis Ignacio "El Tallarín" de la Vega Leija (June 21, 1914 – September 19, 1974) was a Mexican basketball player who competed in the 1936 Summer Olympics.

Born in San Luis Potosí, he was part of the Mexican basketball team, which won the bronze medal. He played five matches.
