= Edmond Leclère =

French basketball player

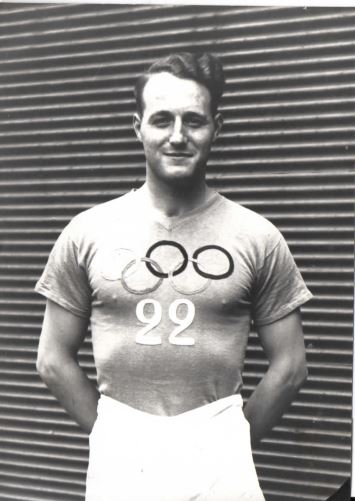
- Edmond Leclère

Personal information
- Nationality: French
- Born: 25 January 1912 Ardennes, France
- Died: 24 March 1986 (aged 74)

Sport
- Sport: Basketball

Edmond Louis Marcel Leclère (25 January 1912 – 24 March 1986) was a French basketball player. He competed in the men's tournament at the 1936 Summer Olympics.
