= Miguel Pedro Martínez Lopes =

Brazilian basketball player (1912-unknown)

Miguel Lopes
Personal information
- Born: 6 July 1912; Rio de Janeiro, Brazil
- Died: 12 October 2008 (aged 96)

Sport
- Sport: Basketball

Miguel Pedro Martínez Lopes, also commonly known as Miguel Pedro (6 July 1912 – 12 October 2008), was a Brazilian basketball player. He competed in the men's tournament at the 1936 Summer Olympics.
