= Fortunato Yambao =

Filipino basketball player

Fortunato Yambao (born October 16, 1912, in Masantol, Pampanga, Philippine Islands; died June 23, 1970, in Cavite, Philippines) was a Filipino basketball player who competed in the 1936 Summer Olympics.
