= Michel Mehech =

Chilean basketball player (1914–2008)

Personal information
- Born: 31 May 1914 Homs, Ottoman Syria
- Died: 3 July 2008 (aged 94) Santiago, Chile

Michel Mehech Haddad (31 May 1914 – 3 July 2008) was a Chilean basketball player. He competed in the 1936 Summer Olympics.
