= Mario Novelli (basketball) =

Italian basketball player (1913–1964)

Personal information
- Born: 12 October 1913 Pula, Austrian Littoral, Austria-Hungary
- Died: 9 November 1964 (aged 51)

Mario Novelli (12 October 1913 – 9 November 1964) was an Italian basketball player. He competed in the 1936 Summer Olympics.
