= Lucien Thèze =

French basketball player

Personal information
- Nationality: French
- Born: 6 October 1913; Romilly-sur-Seine, France
- Died: 7 October 1999 (aged 86)

Sport
- Sport: Basketball

Lucien Thèze (6 October 1913 – 7 October 1999) was a French basketball player. He competed in the men's tournament at the 1936 Summer Olympics.
