= Voldemārs Elmūts =

Latvian basketball player

Personal information
- Nationality: Latvian
- Born: 2 November 1910; Liepāja, Latvia
- Died: 11 July 1966 (aged 55); Boston, Massachusetts, United States

Sport
- Sport: Basketball

Voldemārs Elmūts (2 November 1910 – 11 July 1966) was a Latvian basketball player. He competed in the men's tournament at the 1936 Summer Olympics.
