= Étienne Onimus =

French basketball player

Personal information
- Nationality: French
- Born: 1 January 1907; Mulhouse, France
- Died: 3 January 1982 (aged 75); Mulhouse, France

Sport
- Sport: Basketball

Étienne Onimus (1 January 1907 – 3 January 1982) was a French basketball player. He competed in the men's tournament at the 1936 Summer Olympics.
