= Andrés Gómez (basketball) =

Mexican basketball player (1913–1991)

Olympic medal record

Men's basketball
Bronze medal – third place	1936 Berlin	Team competition

Andrés Gómez Domínguez (November 30, 1913 – July 26, 1991) was a Mexican basketball player who competed in the 1936 Summer Olympics. Born in Guadalajara, Jalisco, he was part of the Mexican basketball team, which won the bronze medal. He played one match.
