= Alejandro González (basketball) =

Uruguayan basketball player (1907–1979)

Alejandro "Alejo" González Roig (5 January 1907 – 13 November 1979) was a Uruguayan basketball player who competed in the 1936 Summer Olympics. Roig was part of the Uruguayan basketball team, which finished sixth in the Olympic tournament. He played all six matches. He was born in Montevideo.
