= Hubert Prokop (basketball) =

Czech basketball player

Personal information
- Nationality: Czech
- Born: 26 May 1909

Sport
- Sport: Basketball

Hubert Prokop (born 26 May 1909, date of death unknown) was a Czech basketball player. He competed in the men's tournament at the 1936 Summer Olympics.
