= Pierre Carlier =

Swiss basketball player

Personal information
- Nationality: Swiss
- Born: 3 December 1915

Sport
- Sport: Basketball

Pierre Carlier (3 December 1915 - 19 Marca 1999) was a Swiss basketball player. He competed in the men's tournament at the 1936 Summer Olympics.
