= Jiří Čtyřoký =

Czech basketball player

Personal information
- Nationality: Czech
- Born: 20 March 1911; Prague, Austria-Hungary
- Died: April 9, 2004 (aged 93); Prague, Czech Republic

Sport
- Sport: Basketball

Jiří Čtyřoký (20 March 1911 – 9 April 2004) was a Czech basketball player. He competed in the men's tournament at the 1936 Summer Olympics.
