= Prudencio de Pena =

Uruguayan basketball player

Prudencio de Pena Gómez (born 21 January 1913 in Montevideo, Uruguay; date of death unknown) was a Uruguayan basketball player who competed in the 1936 Summer Olympics. De Pena was part of the Uruguay national basketball team, which finished sixth in the Olympic tournament. He played one match.
