= Jean Couturier =

French basketball player

Personal information
- Full name: Jean Robert Couturier
- Nationality: French
- Born: 17 July 1911; Trosly-Breuil, France
- Died: 2 February 1994 (aged 82); Reims, France

Sport
- Sport: Basketball

Jean Robert Couturier (17 July 1911 – 2 February 1994) was a French basketball player. He competed in the men's tournament at the 1936 Summer Olympics.
