= Armando Rossi =

Peruvian basketball player

Armando Rossi (born 20 April 1915 in Ayacucho, Peru; died 6 November 1977 in Lima, Peru) was a Peruvian basketball player. He competed in the 1936 Summer Olympics.
