= Rolando Bacigalupo =

Peruvian basketball player (1914–1989)

Personal information
- Born: 14 August 1914 Lima, Peru
- Died: 12 October 1989 (aged 75) Miraflores District, Peru

Justo Rolando Bacigalupo Madueño (14 August 1914 – 12 October 1989) was a Peruvian basketball player. He competed in the 1936 Summer Olympics.
