= Kenshichi Yokoyama =

Japanese basketball player (born 1916)

Personal information
- Nationality: Japanese
- Born: 22 September 1916

Sport
- Sport: Basketball

Kenshichi Yokoyama (born 22 September 1916, date of death unknown) was a Japanese basketball player. He competed in the men's tournament at the 1936 Summer Olympics. Yokoyama is deceased.
