= Chang Ri-jin =

Japanese-Korean basketball player (born 1917)

Personal information
- Nationality: Japanese-Korean
- Born: 28 October 1917; Pyeongyang, Japanese Korea

Sport
- Sport: Basketball

Chang Ri-jin (Korean: 장이진; Hanja: 張利鎭, born 28 October 1917, date of death unknown) was a Korean basketball player. He competed at the 1936 Summer Olympics, representing Japan, and at the 1948 Summer Olympics, representing South Korea. Chang is deceased.
