= Rodolfo Choperena =

Mexican basketball player

Olympic medal record

Men's basketball
Bronze medal – third place	1936 Berlin	Team competition

Rodolfo Choperena Irizarri (February 11, 1905 – July 19, 1969) was a Mexican basketball player who competed in the 1936 Summer Olympics. Born in Mexico City, he was part of the Mexican basketball team, which won the bronze medal. He played two matches.
