= Jesús Olmos =

Mexican basketball player (1910–1988)

Olympic medal record

Men's basketball
| Bronze medal – third place | 1936 Berlin | Team competition |

Jesús "El Tuto" Olmos Moreno (20 July 1910 – 25 October 1988) was a Mexican basketball player who competed in the 1936 Summer Olympics. Born in Chihuahua, he was part of the Mexican basketball team, which won the bronze medal. He played all seven matches.
