= Antonio Oré =

Peruvian basketball player

Personal information
- Born: 7 November 1914 Lima, Peru
- Died: 10 February 1994 (aged 79) Lima, Peru

Juan Antonio Oré Gomero (7 November 1914 – 10 February 1994) was a Peruvian basketball player. He competed in the 1936 Summer Olympics.
