= José Pamplona =

Mexican basketball player

Olympic medal record

Men's basketball
Bronze medal – third place	1936 Berlin	Team competition

José Pamplona Lecuanda (born February 6, 1911, date of death unknown) was a Mexican basketball player. He competed in the 1936 Summer Olympics. Born in San Luis Potosí, Pamplona was part of the Mexican basketball team that won the bronze medal. He played in one match.
