= Pierre Caque =

French basketball player (1909–1949)

Personal information
- Nationality: French
- Born: 27 August 1909; Bétheniville, France
- Died: 1949 (aged 39–40)

Sport
- Sport: Basketball

Pierre Caque (27 August 1909 – 1949) was a French basketball player. He competed in the men's tournament at the 1936 Summer Olympics.
