= Kurt Oleska =

German basketball player (1914–1945)

Personal information
- Nationality: German
- Born: 21 August 1914; Eisfeld, Germany
- Died: 9 January 1945 (aged 30); Russia

Sport
- Sport: Basketball

Kurt Oleska (21 August 1914 – 9 January 1945) was a German basketball player. He competed in the men's tournament at the 1936 Summer Olympics. He was killed in action during World War II.
