= Carlos Gabín =

Uruguayan basketball player

Personal information
- Born: 25 November 1906
- Died: 3 February 1956 (aged 49)

Carlos Gabín (25 November 1906 – 3 February 1956) was a Uruguayan basketball player. He competed in the 1936 Summer Olympics.
