= Carlos Borja (basketball) =

Mexican basketball player (1913–1982)

Olympic medal record

Men's basketball
Bronze medal – third place	1936 Berlin	Team competition

Carlos Borja Morca (May 23, 1913 – November 25, 1982) was a Mexican basketball player who competed in the 1936 Summer Olympics.

Born in Guadalajara, Jalisco, he was part of the Mexican basketball team, which won the bronze medal. He played all six matches.

He represented Mexico in several tournaments. He won in, among others, Juegos Panamericanos y del Caribe and Los juegos Centroamericanos. He retired at age 23. After retiring from playing the sport he became a basketball coach in South America. Colombia was his favorite South American country. He died on November 25, 1982, in Guadalajara, Jalisco, Mexico.
