= Emil Lohbeck =

German basketball player (1905–1944)

Personal information
- Nationality: German
- Born: 15 September 1905; Sprockhövel, Germany
- Died: 29 July 1944 (aged 38); Berlin, Germany

Sport
- Sport: Basketball

Emil Lohbeck (15 September 1905 – 29 July 1944) was a German basketball player. He competed in the men's tournament at the 1936 Summer Olympics. He was killed in action during World War II.

Lohbeck was a career soldier. He played basketball with Heeressportschule Wandorf. They won some sort of unofficial championship in 1938. The team he played with in the Olympics lost every game they were in.
