= Karl Endres =

German basketball player (1911–1993)

Personal information
- Nationality: German
- Born: 15 June 1911; Erlabrunn, Germany
- Died: 29 December 1993 (aged 82); Bayern, Germany

Sport
- Sport: Basketball

Karl Endres (15 June 1911 – 29 December 1993) was a German basketball player. He competed in the men's tournament at the 1936 Summer Olympics.
