= Bernhard Cuiper =

German basketball player (1913–1999)

Personal information
- Nationality: German
- Born: 8 October 1913; Frankfurt, Germany
- Died: 29 April 1999 (aged 85); Kelheim, Germany

Sport
- Sport: Basketball

Bernhard Cuiper (8 October 1913 – 29 April 1999) was a German basketball player. He competed in the men's tournament at the 1936 Summer Olympics.
