= Siegfried Reischies =

German basketball player (1909–1982)

Personal information
- Nationality: German
- Born: 10 July 1909; Königsberg, German Empire
- Died: 12 December 1982 (aged 73); Munich, Germany

Sport
- Sport: Basketball

Siegfried Reischies (10 July 1909 – 12 December 1982) was a German basketball player. He competed in the men's tournament at the 1936 Summer Olympics.
