= Eusebio Hernández (basketball) =

Chilean basketball player (1911–1997)

Personal information
- Born: 26 June 1911 Valparaíso, Chile
- Died: 21 June 1997 (aged 85) Valparaíso, Chile

Eusebio "El Corcho" Hernández Munilla (26 June 1911 – 21 June 1997) was a Chilean basketball player. He competed in the 1936 Summer Olympics.
