= Robert Duis =

German basketball player (1913–1991)

Personal information
- Nationality: German
- Born: 14 May 1913; London, England
- Died: 25 March 1991 (aged 77); Klosters, Switzerland

Sport
- Sport: Basketball

Robert Duis (14 May 1913 – 25 March 1991) was a German basketball player. He competed in the men's tournament at the 1936 Summer Olympics.
