= Hans Niclaus =

German basketball player (1914–1997)

Personal information
- Nationality: German
- Born: 8 March 1914; Leipzig, Germany
- Died: 3 September 1997 (aged 83); Kempen, Germany

Sport
- Sport: Basketball

Hans Niclaus (8 March 1914 – 3 September 1997) was a German basketball player. He competed in the men's tournament at the 1936 Summer Olympics.
