= Víctor Latou =

Uruguayan basketball player

Personal information
- Born: 30 April 1913 Montevideo, Uruguay
- Died: 12 December 2002 (aged 89) Antofagasta, Chile

Víctor Miguel Tomás Latou Jaume (30 April 1913 – 12 December 2002) was a Uruguayan basketball player. He competed in the 1936 Summer Olympics.
