= Raúl Fernández (basketball) =

Mexican basketball player (1905–1982)

Olympic medal record

Men's basketball
Bronze medal – third place	1936 Berlin	Team competition

Raúl "El Foch" Fernández Robert (September 17, 1905 – September 4, 1982) was a Mexican basketball player. He competed in the 1936 Summer Olympics. Born in Mexico City, Fernández was part of the Mexican basketball team, which won the bronze medal. He played in all seven of the squad's matches.
