= Greer Skousen =

Mexican basketball player (1916–1988)

Olympic medal record

Men's basketball
Bronze medal – third place	1936 Berlin	Team competition

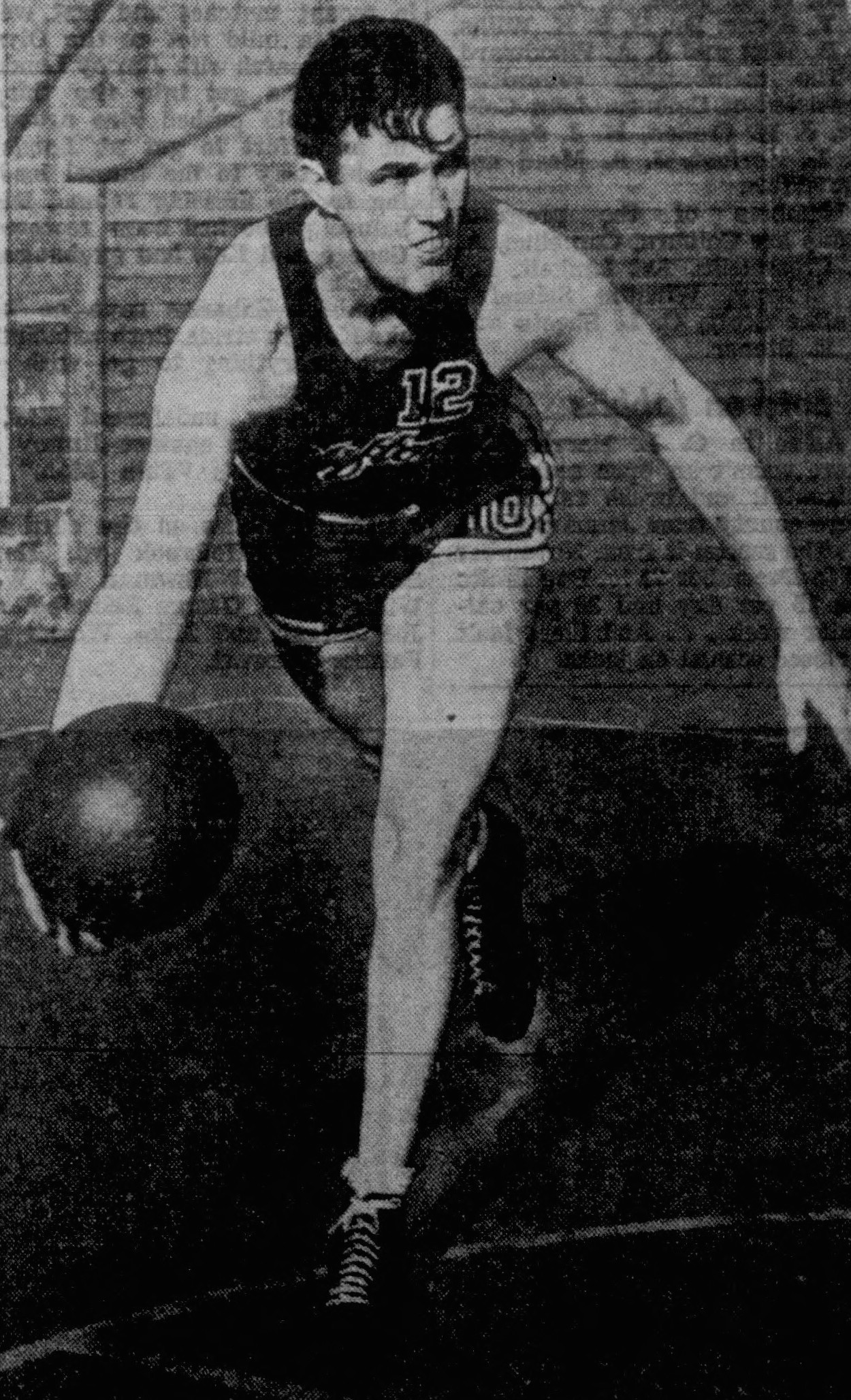
Skousen, circa 1942

Aytch Greer Skousen (September 24, 1916 – March 20, 1988) was a Mexican basketball player who competed in the 1936 Summer Olympics.

Born in Casas Grandes, Chihuahua, he was part of the Mexican basketball team which won the bronze medal. He played five matches.

In 1950–1951 he taught and coached public school for the Toyah School District in Toyah, Texas. Skousen died in San Antonio, Texas.
