= Aleksander Margiste =

Estonian basketball player

Personal information
- Born: 19 April 1908 Tallinn, Governorate of Estonia, Russian Empire
- Died: 10 August 1988 (aged 80) Stockholm, Sweden

Aleksander Margiste (19 April 1908 – 10 August 1988) was an Estonian basketball player. He competed in the 1936 Summer Olympics.
