= Tabaré Quintans =

Uruguayan basketball player

Personal information
- Born: 8 May 1909

Tabaré Quintans (born 8 May 1909, date of death unknown) was a Uruguayan basketball player. He competed in the 1936 Summer Olympics.
