= Heinz Steinschulte =

German basketball player

Personal information
- Nationality: German
- Born: 28 April 1909

Sport
- Sport: Basketball

Heinz Steinschulte (born 28 April 1909, date of death unknown) was a German basketball player. He competed in the men's tournament at the 1936 Summer Olympics.
