= Willard Schmidt (basketball) =

American basketball player (1910–1965)

Personal information
- Born: February 14, 1910 Swanton, Nebraska, U.S.
- Died: April 13, 1965 (aged 55) Coffeyville, Kansas, U.S.
- Listed height: 6 ft 8 in (2.03 m)
- Listed weight: 190 lb (86 kg)

Career information
- High school: Swanton (Swanton, Nebraska)
- College: Creighton (1931–1934)
Medals
Men's basketball
Representing the United States
Olympic Games
Gold medal – first place	1936 Berlin	Team competition

Willard Theodore Schmidt (February 14, 1910 – April 13, 1965) was an American basketball player who competed in the 1936 Summer Olympics.

He was part of the American basketball team, which won the gold medal. He played one match.

He played college basketball at Creighton University.
