= Leandro Gómez (basketball) =

Uruguayan basketball player

Personal information
- Born: 21 March 1902 Montevideo, Uruguay
- Died: 18 April 1979 (aged 77)

Leandro Gómez Harley (21 March 1902 – 18 April 1979) was a Uruguayan basketball player. He competed in the 1936 Summer Olympics.
