= Gregorio Agós =

Uruguayan basketball player (1913–2001)

Personal information
- Born: 8 June 1913
- Died: 8 September 2001 (aged 88)

Gregorio Agós Muruzabal (8 June 1913 – 8 September 2001) was a Uruguayan basketball player. He competed in the 1936 Summer Olympics.
