= Carmino de Pilla =

Brazilian basketball player

Personal information
- Nationality: Brazilian
- Born: 12 June 1912
- Died: 15 March 1993 (aged 80)

Sport
- Sport: Basketball

Carmino de Pilla (12 June 1912 – 15 March 1993) was a Brazilian basketball player. He competed in the men's tournament at the 1936 Summer Olympics.
