= Otto Kuchenbecker =

German basketball player (1907–1990)

Personal information
- Nationality: German
- Born: 16 October 1907; Demmin, Germany
- Died: 14 November 1990 (aged 83); Bad Nenndorf, Germany

Sport
- Sport: Basketball

Otto Kuchenbecker (16 October 1907 – 14 November 1990) was a German basketball player. He competed in the men's tournament at the 1936 Summer Olympics.
