= Carl Shy =

American basketball player (1908–1991)

Personal information
- Born: September 13, 1908 Los Angeles, California, U.S.
- Died: December 17, 1991 (aged 83)
- Listed height: 6 ft 1 in (1.85 m)
- Listed weight: 170 lb (77 kg)

Career information
- College: UCLA
- Position: Guard
Medals
Men's basketball
Representing the United States
Olympic Games
Gold medal – first place	1936 Berlin	Team competition

Carl Leslie Shy (September 13, 1908 – December 17, 1991) was an American basketball player who competed in the 1936 Summer Olympics. He was part of the United States basketball team that won the gold medal. He played in three matches, including the championship. Shy played college basketball at UCLA.
