= Emil Göing =

German basketball player (1912–1994)

Personal information
- Nationality: German
- Born: 31 January 1912; Hanover, Germany
- Died: 14 June 1994 (aged 82); Usingen, Germany

Sport
- Sport: Basketball

Emil Göing (31 January 1912 – 14 June 1994) was a German basketball player. He competed in the men's tournament at the 1936 Summer Olympics.
