= Duane Swanson =

American basketball player (1913–2000)

Personal information
- Born: August 23, 1913 Waterman, Illinois, U.S.
- Died: September 13, 2000 (aged 87) Cumberland Furnace, Tennessee, U.S.
- Listed height: 6 ft 1 in (1.85 m)
- Listed weight: 185 lb (84 kg)

Career information
- High school: Waterman (Waterman, Illinois)
- Playing career: 1933–1940
- Position: Guard / forward

Career history
- 1933–1934: Columbia Studios
- 1934–1935: Joe E. Brown All-Stars
- 1935–1937: Universal Studios
- 1937–1939: MGM
- 1940: Sheboygan Red Skins
Medals
Men's basketball
Representing the United States
Olympic Games
Gold medal – first place	1936 Berlin	Team

Duane Alexander Swanson (August 23, 1913 – September 13, 2000) was an American basketball player who competed in the 1936 Summer Olympics, winning a gold medal. He also played professionally: In eleven games during the 1939–40 National Basketball League (NBL) season, he averaged 1.2 points per game for the Sheboygan Red Skins. Duane Swanson's first name is often incorrectly attributed to be "George."

== Biography ==
Swanson grew up in Waterman, Illinois and attended Illinois Wesleyan University for a brief time before transferring to the University of Iowa. He played on Iowa's freshman basketball team when he and a friend decided to drop out of school and hitchhike to Los Angeles, California to enroll at the University of Southern California (USC). Iowa head coach Rollie Williams accused USC head coach Sam Barry of luring both players to California, which Barry denied. Consequently, Barry rejected Swanson and his friend from playing for USC. Instead, they signed a contract to play for Columbia Studios' team, which led to their first connections in the Hollywood industry. In 1934, Swanson signed with Joe E. Brown's All-Stars team, whom he spent the 1934–35 season competing for. In spring 1935, he played on an Amateur Athletic Union (AAU) All-Star team that toured Japan, playing in 15 games.

In 1935–36, Swanson played for Universal Studios' basketball team. This squad finished second in the national AAU tournament and first in the Olympic Trials, winning the right to represent the United States at the Berlin Olympics. He ended up playing in three games during the Olympics and won a gold medal.

Upon returning to the United States, Swanson stayed in Los Angeles a few more years competing for studio teams before returning to the Midwest in 1940. He signed with the NBL's Sheboygan Red Skins to finish out the season, appearing in eleven games. This stint would be his last as a professional basketball. Swanson returned to Southern California and after serving in the United States Army during World War II, spent the next 25 years working in the entertainment industry.
