= Rodolfo Braselli =

Uruguayan basketball player

Eusebio Rodolfo Braselli Liberatto
Personal information
- Born: 14 August 1908 Montevideo, Uruguay

Rodolfo Braselli (14 August 1908 – ?) was a Uruguayan basketball player. He competed in the 1936 Summer Olympics.
