= Jack Ragland =

American basketball player

Medal record

Men's basketball

Representing the United States

Olympic Games
Gold medal – first place	1936 Berlin	Team competition

Jack Williamson Ragland (October 9, 1913 – June 14, 1996) was an American basketball player who competed in the 1936 Summer Olympics.

He was part of the American basketball team, which won the gold medal. He played two matches including the final.

He played college basketball at Wichita State University.
