= Takao Nakae =

Japanese basketball player (born 1913)

Personal information
- Nationality: Japanese
- Born: 30 April 1913

Sport
- Sport: Basketball

Takao Nakae (born 30 April 1913, date of death unknown) was a Japanese basketball player. He competed in the men's tournament at the 1936 Summer Olympics.
