= Handball at the 1936 Summer Olympics – Men's team squads =

List of handball players

The following teams competed in the men's tournament at the 1936 Summer Olympics.

- GK=Goalkeeper
- DF=Defender
- MF=Midfielder
- FW=Forward

Handball

== Austria ==
Austria had a squad of 22 players.

Head coach:

No.	Pos.	Player	DoB	Age	Caps	Club	Tournament games	Tournament goals
	DF	Franz Bartl	January 7, 1915	21	?		3	?
	FW	Franz Berghammer	November 20, 1913	22	?		2	?
	FW	Franz Bistricky	July 26, 1914	22	?		2	?
	DF	Franz Brunner	March 21, 1913	23	?		2	?
	MF	Johann Houschka	October 21, 1914	21	?		2	?
	MF	Emil Juracka	June 11, 1912	24	?		3	?
	FW	Ferdinand Kiefler	August 4, 1913	23	?		4	?
	FW	Josef Krejci	March 2, 1911	25	?		2	?
	MF	Otto Licha	November 2, 1912	23	?		3	?
	GK	Friedrich Maurer	June 18, 1912	24	?		2	?
	FW	Anton Perwein	November 10, 1911	24	?		3	?
	FW	Siegfried Powolny	September 20, 1915	20	?		2	?
	MF	Siegfried Purner	February 16, 1915	21	?		2	?
	FW	Walter Reisp	November 5, 1910	25	?		2	?
	FW	Alfred Schmalzer	October 28, 1912	23	?		3	?
	GK	Alois Schnabel	February 27, 1910	26	?		3	?
	FW	Ludwig Schuberth	July 24, 1911	25	?		2	?
	DF	Johann Tauscher	March 31, 1909	27	?		3	?
	FW	Jaroslav Volak	July 7, 1915	21	?		3	?
	MF	Leopold Wohlrab	March 22, 1912	24	?		3	?
	DF	Friedrich Wurmböck	August 2, 1903	33	?		2	?
	MF	Johann Zehetner	September 4, 1912	23	?		2	?

== Germany ==
Germany had a squad of 22 players.

Head coach: Otto-Günther Kaundinya

No.	Pos.	Player	DoB	Age	Caps	Club	Tournament games	Tournament goals
	DF	Willy Bandholz	March 5, 1913	23	?		4	?
	FW	Wilhelm Baumann	August 12, 1912	23	?		2	?
	FW	Helmut Berthold	April 19, 1911	25	?		2	?
	FW	Helmut Braselmann	September 18, 1911	24	?	(Germany) Tura-Barmen	2	?
	MF	Wilhelm Brinkmann	October 25, 1910	25	?		2	?
	MF	Georg Dascher	June 27, 1911	25	?		2	?
	MF	Kurt Dossin	March 28, 1913	23	?	(Germany) MTSA Leipzig	2	?
	FW	Fritz Fromm	April 12, 1913	23	?		2	?
	MF	Hermann Hansen	October 31, 1912	23	?	(Germany) Polizei SV Hamburg	2	?
	FW	Erich Herrmann	May 31, 1914	22	?		2	?
	GK	Heinrich Keimig	June 12, 1913	23	?		1	?
	MF	Hans Keiter	March 22, 1910	26	?		2	?
	FW	Alfred Klingler	October 25, 1912	23	?		2	?
	DF	Artur Knautz	March 20, 1911	25	?	(Germany) MSV Hindenburg Minden	2	?
	GK	Heinz Körvers	July 3, 1915	21	?	(Germany) MSV Hindenburg Minden	1	?
	GK	Karl Kreutzberg	February 15, 1912	24	?	(Germany) VfB Aachen	2	?
	DF	Wilhelm Müller	December 5, 1909	26	?		2	?
	FW	Günther Ortmann	November 30, 1916	19	?		2	?
	FW	Edgar Reinhardt	May 21, 1914	22	?		2	?
	FW	Fritz Spengler	September 6, 1908	27	?		2	?
	MF	Rudolf Stahl	February 11, 1912	24	?		2	?
	FW	Hans Theilig	August 12, 1914	21	?		2	?

== Hungary ==
The following players represented Hungary.

Head coach: István Sass

No.	Pos.	Player	DoB	Age	Caps	Club	Tournament games	Tournament goals
	DF	Antal Benda	April 14, 1910	26	?	(Hungary) Újpesti Torna Egylet	4	0
	FW	Sándor Cséfai	July 13, 1904	32	?	(Hungary) Elektromos MSE	3	5
	FW	Ferenc Cziráki	November 19, 1913	29	?	(Hungary) Újpesti Torna Egylet	4	0
	FW	Miklós Fodor	September 3, 1908	27	?	(Hungary) Elektromos MSE	4	5
	MF	Lőrinc Galgóczi	September 24, 1911	24	?	(Hungary) Újpesti Torna Egylet	3	0
	DF/MF/FW	János Koppány	February 13, 1908	28	?	(Hungary) Elektromos MSE	4	0
	MF	Lajos Kutasi	October 12, 1915	20	?	(Hungary) Elektromos MSE	4	0
	GK	Tibor Máté	December 14, 1914	21	?	(Hungary) Vívó és Atlétikai Club	2	0
	DF/MF	Imre Páli	November 6, 1909	26	?	(Hungary) Újpesti Torna Egylet	2	0
	MF	Ferenc Rákosi	November 25, 1910	25	?	(Hungary) Elektromos MSE	4	2
	FW	Endre Salgó	December 11, 1913	22	?	(Hungary) Vívó és Atlétikai Club	3	6
	DF	István Serényi	August 26, 1911	24	?	(Hungary) Vívó és Atlétikai Club	4	0
	FW	Sándor Szomori	November 6, 1910	25	?	(Hungary) Újpesti Torna Egylet	3	1
	FW	Gyula Takács	September 4, 1914	21	?	(Hungary) MAFC	4	6
	GK	Antal Újváry	March 16, 1907	29	?	(Hungary) Elektromos MSE	3	0
	FW	Ferenc Velkey	November 15, 1915	20	?	(Hungary) Elektromos MSE	3	0

== Romania ==
The following players represented Romania.

No.	Pos.	Name	Date of birth (age)	Height	App.	Goals	Club
	GK	Stefan Zoller	27 August 1914 (aged 21)		2	0	(Romania) Hermannstädter Turnverein
	GK	Péter Fecsi	21 July 1905 (aged 31)		1	0	(Romania) Viforul Dacia București
	DF	Karl Haffer	2 November 1912 (aged 23)		3		(Romania) Hermannstädter Turnverein
	DF	Friedrich Haffer	26 May 1914 (aged 22)		3		(Romania) Hermannstädter Turnverein
	MF	Robert Speck	28 April 1909 (aged 27)		3		(Romania) Hermannstädter Turnverein
	FW	Wilhelm Zacharias	7 March 1914 (aged 22)		2		(Romania) Hermannstädter Turnverein
	MF	Alfred Höchsmann	1 April 1909 (aged 27)		3		(Romania) Hermannstädter Turnverein
	FW	Friedrich Halmen	2 April 1912 (aged 24)		3		(Romania) Hermannstädter Turnverein
	FW	Günter Schorsten	14 April 1916 (aged 20)		2		(Romania) Hermannstädter Turnverein
	MF/FW	Wilhelm Heidel	28 February 1916 (aged 20)		3	1	(Romania) Hermannstädter Turnverein
		Johann Sonntag			0	0	(Romania) Hermannstädter Turnverein
	FW	Hans Georg Herzog	7 May 1915 (aged 21)		1		(Romania) Hermannstädter Turnverein
	FW	Wilhelm Kirschner	9 December 1911 (aged 24)		3	2	(Romania) Hermannstädter Turnverein
	FW	Hans Hermannstädter	6 February 1918 (aged 18)		1		(Romania) Hermannstädter Turnverein
		Drăgan Comănescu			0	0	(Romania) Viforul Dacia București
	MF	Hans Zikeli	3 October 1910 (aged 25)		2		(Romania) Mediascher Turnverein
	MF	Bruno Holzträger	29 July 1916 (aged 20)		1		(Romania) Mediascher Turnverein
		Friedrich Kasemiresch			0	0	(Romania) Mediascher Turnverein
		Stippi Orendi			0	0	(Romania) Kronstadter Turnverein

== Switzerland ==
The following players represented Switzerland.

No.	Pos.	Name	Date of birth (age)	Height	App.	Goals	Club
	MF	Max Blösch	27 June 1908 (aged 28)		1	0	(Switzerland)
	MF	Rolf Fäs	18 October 1916 (aged 19)		5	1	(Switzerland) Rotweiss Basel
	MF	Burkhard Gantenbein	14 August 1912 (aged 23)		2	0	(Switzerland) Grasshopper Club Zürich
	GK	Willy Gysi	9 January 1918 (aged 18)		2	0	(Switzerland)
	MF	Erland Herkenrath	24 September 1912 (aged 23)	1,84 m	5	0	(Switzerland) Grasshopper Club Zürich
	FW	Ernst Hufschmid	9 October 1910 (aged 25)		5	1	(Switzerland) ATV Basel
	FW	Willy Hufschmid	9 October 1918 (aged 17)		3	1	(Switzerland) ATV Basel
	FW	Werner Meyer	30 May 1914 (aged 22)		3	3	(Switzerland) ATV Basel
	FW	Georg Mischon	28 August 1907 (aged 28)		4	3	(Switzerland)
	FW	Willy Schäfer	30 April 1913 (aged 23)		1	2	(Switzerland)
	FW	Werner Scheurmann	27 September 1909 (aged 26)		1	0	(Switzerland) Stadtpolizei Zürich
	GK	Edy Schmid	3 May 1911 (aged 25)		3	0	(Switzerland) Grasshopper Club Zürich
	DF	Erich Schmitt	6 August 1909 (aged 27)		5	0	(Switzerland) Grasshopper Club Zürich
	FW	Eugen Seiterle	7 December 1913 (aged 22)		3	0	(Switzerland) Grasshopper Club Zürich
	FW	Max Streib	20 December 1912 (aged 23)		5	2	(Switzerland)
	DF	Robert Studer	17 February 1912 (aged 24)		4	0	(Switzerland)
	FW	Rudolf Wirz	28 January 1918 (aged 18)		3	0	(Switzerland) ATV Basel

== United States ==
The following players represented the United States.

Playin coach:Willy Renz, Trainer: Fred Brenner, Manager: Dietrich Wortmann & Assistant manager: Walter Mangel

No.	Pos.	Name	Date of birth (age)	Height	App.	Goals	Club
	MF	William Ahlemeyer	20 July 1907 (aged 29)		3		(United States) German-American AC Queens
	FW	Walter Bowden	29 December 1910 (aged 25)		3		(United States) German Sport Club Brooklyn
	DF	Charles Dauner	5 January 1912 (aged 24)		1	0	(United States) German Sport Club Brooklyn
	DF	Edward Hagen	4 March 1908 (aged 28)		2	0	(United States) Cake Bakers Sport Club
	FW	Joe Kaylor	6 July 1916 (aged 20)		3	1	(United States) Deutscher Sport Club NY
	FW	Fred Leinweber	17 March 1915 (aged 21)		3		(United States) German Sport Club Brooklyn
	GK	Henry Oehler	22 March 1916 (aged 20)		3	0	(United States) German Sport Club Brooklyn
	MF	Otto Oehler	25 November 1913 (aged 22)		1	0	(United States) German Sport Club Brooklyn
	MF	Herbert Oehmichen	14 August 1915 (aged 20)		2		(United States) German-American AC Queens
	FW	Willy Renz	24 May 1916 (aged 20)		3		(United States) Cake Bakers Sport Club
	DF	Alfred Rosesco	1 January 1914 (aged 22)		3	0	(United States) German Sport Club Brooklyn
	MF	Edmund Schallenberg	11 October 1913 (aged 22)		3		(United States) German Sport Club Brooklyn
	FW	Gerard Yantz	27 June 1916 (aged 20)		3		(United States) German Sport Club Brooklyn
		Philipp Schupp	11 August 1911 (aged 24)		0	0	(United States) German Sport Club Brooklyn

Source: First half & Second half
