= List of Olympic medalists in handball (men) =

These are the Olympic medalists in men's handball.

Games	Gold	Silver	Bronze
1936 Berlin	Germany; Willy Bandholz; Wilhelm Baumann; Helmut Berthold; Helmut Braselmann; Wilhelm Brinkmann; Georg Dascher; Kurt Dossin; Fritz Fromm; Hermann Hansen; Erich Herrmann; Heinrich Keimig; Hans Keiter; Alfred Klingler; Artur Knautz; Heinz Körvers; Karl Kreutzberg; Wilhelm Müller; Günther Ortmann; Edgar Reinhardt; Fritz Spengler; Rudolf Stahl; Hans Theilig	Austria; Franz Bartl; Franz Berghammer; Franz Bistricky; Franz Brunner; Johann Houschka; Emil Juracka; Ferdinand Kiefler; Josef Krejci; Otto Licha; Friedrich Maurer; Anton Perwein; Siegfried Powolny; Siegfried Purner; Walter Reisp; Alfred Schmalzer; Alois Schnabel; Ludwig Schuberth; Johann Tauscher; Jaroslav Volak; Leopold Wohlrab; Friedrich Wurmböck; Johann Zehetner	Switzerland; Max Blösch; Rolf Fäs; Burkhard Gantenbein; Willy Gysi; Erland Herkenrath; Ernst Hufschmid; Willy Hufschmid; Werner Meyer; Georg Mischon; Willy Schäfer; Werner Scheurmann; Edy Schmid; Erich Schmitt; Eugen Seiterle; Max Streib; Robert Studer; Rudolf Wirz
1948–1968	not included in the Olympic program		
1972 Munich	Yugoslavia; Abaz Arslanagić; Petar Fajfrić; Hrvoje Horvat; Milorad Karalić; Đorđe Lavrnić; Milan Lazarević; Zdravko Miljak; Slobodan Mišković; Branislav Pokrajac; Nebojša Popović; Miroslav Pribanić; Albin Vidović; Zoran Živković; Zdenko Zorko	Czechoslovakia; Ladislav Beneš; František Brůna; Vladimír Haber; Vladimír Jarý; Jiří Kavan; Arnošt Klimčík; Jaroslav Konečný; František Králík; Jindřich Krepindl; Vincent Lafko; Andrej Lukošík; Pavel Mikeš; Peter Pospíšil; Ivan Satrapa; Zdeněk Škára; Jaroslav Škarvan	Romania; Ştefan Birtalan; Adrian Cosma; Marin Dan; Alexandru Dincă; Cristian Gaţu; Gheorghe Gruia; Roland Gunesch; Gabriel Kicsid; Ghiţă Licu; Cornel Penu; Valentin Samungi; Simion Schöbel; Werner Stöckl; Constantin Tudosie; Radu Voina
1976 Montreal	Soviet Union; Aleksandr Anpilogov; Yevgeni Chernyshov; Anatoli Fedyukin; Valeri Gassy; Vasily Ilyin; Mykhaylo Ishchenko; Yury Kidyayev; Yury Klimov; Vladimir Kravtsov; Serhiy Kushniryuk; Yuriy Lahutyn; Vladimir Maksimov; Oleksandr Rezanov; Mykola Tomyn	Romania; Ştefan Birtalan; Adrian Cosma; Cezar Drăgăniṭă; Alexandru Fölker; Cristian Gaţu; Mircea Grabovschi; Roland Gunesch; Gabriel Kicsid; Ghiţă Licu; Nicolae Munteanu; Cornel Penu; Werner Stöckl; Constantin Tudosie; Radu Voina	Poland; Zdzisław Antczak; Janusz Brzozowski; Piotr Cieśla; Jan Gmyrek; Alfred Kałuziński; Jerzy Klempel; Zygfryd Kuchta; Jerzy Melcer; Ryszard Przybysz; Henryk Rozmiarek; Andrzej Sokołowski; Andrzej Szymczak; Mieczysław Wojczak; Włodzimierz Zieliński
1980 Moscow	East Germany; Hans-Georg Beyer; Lothar Doering; Günter Dreibrodt; Ernst Gerlach; Klaus Gruner; Rainer Höft; Hans-Georg Jaunich; Hartmut Krüger; Peter Rost; Dietmar Schmidt; Wieland Schmidt; Siegfried Voigt; Frank-Michael Wahl; Ingolf Wiegert	Soviet Union; Aleksandr Anpilogov; Vladimir Belov; Yevgeni Chernyshov; Anatoli Fedyukin; Mykhaylo Ishchenko; Aleksandr Karshakevich; Yury Kidyayev; Vladimir Kravtsov; Serhiy Kushniryuk; Viktor Makhorin; Voldemaras Novickis; Vladimir Repev; Mykola Tomyn; Aleksey Zhuk	Romania; Ştefan Birtalan; Iosif Boroş; Adrian Cosma; Cezar Drăgăniṭă; Marian Dumitru; Cornel Durău; Alexandru Fölker; Claudiu Ionescu; Nicolae Munteanu; Vasile Stîngă; Lucian Vasilache; Neculai Vasilcă; Radu Voina; Maricel Voinea
1984 Los Angeles	Yugoslavia; Zlatan Arnautović; Mirko Bašić; Jovica Elezović; Mile Isaković; Pavle Jurina; Milan Kalina; Slobodan Kuzmanovski; Dragan Mladenović; Zdravko Rađenović; Momir Rnić; Branko Štrbac; Veselin Vujović; Veselin Vuković; Zdravko Zovko	West Germany; Jochen Fraatz; Thomas Happe; Arnulf Meffle; Rüdiger Neitzel; Michael Paul; Dirk Rauin; Siegfried Roch; Michael Roth; Ulrich Roth; Martin Schwalb; Uwe Schwenker; Thomas Springel; Andreas Thiel; Klaus Wöller; Erhard Wunderlich	Romania; Mircea Bedivan; Dumitru Berbece; Iosif Boroş; Alexandru Buligan; Gheorghe Covaciu; Gheorghe Dogărescu; Marian Dumitru; Cornel Durău; Alexandru Fölker; Nicolae Munteanu; Vasile Oprea; Adrian Simion; Vasile Stîngă; Neculai Vasilcă; Maricel Voinea
1988 Seoul	Soviet Union; Vyacheslav Atavin; Igor Chumak; Valery Gopin; Aleksandr Karshakevich; Andrey Lavrov; Yuri Nesterov; Voldemaras Novickis; Aleksandr Rymanov; Konstantin Sharovarov; Yuri Shevtsov; Georgi Sviridenko; Aleksandr Tuchkin; Andrey Tyumentsev; Mikhail Vasilyev	South Korea; Choi Suk-Jae; Kang Jae-Won; Kim Jae-hwan; Koh Suk-Chang; Lee Sang-Hyo; Lim Jin-Suk; Noh Hyun-Suk; Oh Young-Ki; Park Do-Hun; Park Young-Dae; Shim Jae-Hong; Shin Young-Suk; Yoon Tae-Il	Yugoslavia; Mirko Bašić; Jožef Holpert; Boris Jarak; Slobodan Kuzmanovski; Muhammed Memić; Alvaro Načinović; Goran Perkovac; Zlatko Portner; Iztok Puc; Rolando Pušnik; Momir Rnić; Zlatko Saračević; Irfan Smajlagić; Ermin Velić; Veselin Vujović
1992 Barcelona	Unified Team; Andrey Barbashinsky; Serhiy Bebeshko; Igor Chumak; Talant Duyshebaev; Yuriy Gavrilov; Valery Gopin; Oleg Grebnev; Oleg Kiselyov; Vasily Kudinov; Andrey Lavrov; Igor Vasilyev; Mikhail Yakimovich	Sweden; Magnus Andersson; Robert Andersson; Anders Bäckegren; Per Carlén; Magnus Cato; Erik Hajas; Robert Hedin; Patrik Liljestrand; Ola Lindgren; Mats Olsson; Staffan Olsson; Axel Sjöblad; Tommy Suoraniemi; Tomas Svensson; Pierre Thorsson; Magnus Wislander	France; Philippe Debureau; Philippe Gardent; Denis Lathoud; Pascal Mahé; Philippe Médard; Gaël Monthurel; Laurent Munier; Frédéric Perez; Alain Portes; Thierry Perreux; Éric Quintin; Jackson Richardson; Stéphane Stoecklin; Jean-Luc Thiébaut; Denis Tristant; Frédéric Volle
1996 Atlanta	Croatia; Patrik Ćavar; Valner Franković; Slavko Goluža; Bruno Gudelj; Vladimir Jelčić; Božidar Jović; Nenad Kljaić; Venio Losert; Valter Matošević; Zoran Mikulić; Alvaro Načinović; Goran Perkovac; Iztok Puc; Zlatko Saračević; Irfan Smajlagić; Vladimir Šujster	Sweden; Magnus Andersson; Robert Andersson; Per Carlén; Martin Frändesjö; Erik Hajas; Robert Hedin; Andreas Larsson; Ola Lindgren; Stefan Lövgren; Mats Olsson; Staffan Olsson; Johan Petersson; Tomas Svensson; Tomas Sivertsson; Pierre Thorsson; Magnus Wislander	Spain; Talant Duyshebaev; Salvador Esquer; Aitor Etxaburu; Jesús Fernández; Jaume Fort; Mateo Garralda; Raúl González; Rafael Guijosa; Fernando Hernández; José Javier Hombrados; Demetrio Lozano; Jordi Nuñez; Jesús Olalla; Juan Pérez; Iñaki Urdangarín; Alberto Urdiales
2000 Sydney	Russia; Dmitry Filippov; Vyacheslav Gorpishin; Oleg Khodkov; Eduard Koksharov; Denis Krivoshlykov; Vasily Kudinov; Stanislav Kulinchenko; Dmitry Kuzelev; Andrey Lavrov; Igor Lavrov; Sergey Pogorelov; Pavel Sukosyan; Dmitri Torgovanov; Aleksandr Tuchkin; Lev Voronin	Sweden; Magnus Andersson; Martin Boquist; Martin Frändesjö; Mathias Franzén; Peter Gentzel; Andreas Larsson; Ola Lindgren; Stefan Lövgren; Staffan Olsson; Johan Petersson; Tomas Svensson; Tomas Sivertsson; Pierre Thorsson; Ljubomir Vranjes; Magnus Wislander	Spain; David Barrufet; Talant Duyshebaev; Mateo Garralda; Rafael Guijosa; Demetrio Lozano; Enric Masip; Jordi Nuñez; Jesús Olalla; Juan Pérez; Xavier O'Callaghan; Antonio Carlos Ortega; Antonio Ugalde; Iñaki Urdangarín; Alberto Urdiales; Andrei Xepkin
2004 Athens	Croatia; Ivano Balić; Davor Dominiković; Mirza Džomba; Slavko Goluža; Nikša Kaleb; Blaženko Lacković; Venio Losert; Valter Matošević; Petar Metličić; Vlado Šola; Denis Špoljarić; Goran Šprem; Igor Vori; Vedran Zrnić	Germany; Markus Baur; Frank von Behren; Mark Dragunski; Henning Fritz; Pascal Hens; Jan Olaf Immel; Torsten Jansen; Florian Kehrmann; Stefan Kretzschmar; Klaus-Dieter Petersen; Christian Ramota; Christian Schwarzer; Daniel Stephan; Christian Zeitz; Volker Zerbe	Russia; Mikhail Chipurin; Aleksandr Gorbatikov; Vyacheslav Gorpishin; Vitali Ivanov; Eduard Koksharov; Alexey Kostygov; Denis Krivoshlykov; Vasily Kudinov; Oleg Kuleshov; Andrey Lavrov; Sergey Pogorelov; Alexey Rastvortsev; Dmitri Torgovanov; Aleksandr Tuchkin
2008 Beijing	France; Luc Abalo; Joël Abati; Cédric Burdet; Didier Dinart; Jérôme Fernandez; Bertrand Gille; Guillaume Gille; Olivier Girault; Michaël Guigou; Nikola Karabatić; Daouda Karaboué; Christophe Kempé; Daniel Narcisse; Thierry Omeyer; Cédric Paty	Iceland; Sturla Ásgeirsson; Arnór Atlason; Logi Geirsson; Snorri Guðjónsson; Hreiðar Guðmundsson; Róbert Gunnarsson; Björgvin Páll Gústavsson; Ásgeir Örn Hallgrímsson; Ingimundur Ingimundarson; Sverre Andreas Jakobsson; Alexander Petersson; Guðjón Valur Sigurðsson; Sigfús Sigurðsson; Ólafur Stefánsson	Spain; David Barrufet; Jon Belaustegui; David Davis; Alberto Entrerríos; Raúl Entrerríos; Rubén Garabaya; Juanín García; José Javier Hombrados; Demetrio Lozano; Cristian Malmagro; Carlos Prieto; Albert Rocas; Iker Romero; Víctor Tomás
2012 London	France; Jérôme Fernandez; Didier Dinart; Xavier Barachet; Guillaume Gille; Bertrand Gille; Daniel Narcisse; Guillaume Joli; Samuel Honrubia; Daouda Karaboué; Nikola Karabatić; Thierry Omeyer; William Accambray; Luc Abalo; Cédric Sorhaindo; Michaël Guigou	Sweden; Mattias Andersson; Mattias Gustafsson; Kim Andersson; Jonas Källman; Magnus Jernemyr; Niclas Ekberg; Dalibor Doder; Jonas Larholm; Tobias Karlsson; Johan Jakobsson; Johan Sjöstrand; Fredrik Petersen; Kim Ekdahl du Rietz; Mattias Zachrisson; Andreas Nilsson	Croatia; Venio Losert; Ivano Balić; Domagoj Duvnjak; Blaženko Lacković; Marko Kopljar; Igor Vori; Jakov Gojun; Zlatko Horvat; Drago Vuković; Damir Bičanić; Denis Buntić; Mirko Alilović; Manuel Štrlek; Ivan Čupić; Ivan Ninčević
2016 Rio de Janeiro	Denmark; Niklas Landin Jacobsen; Mads Christiansen; Mads Mensah Larsen; Casper Ulrich Mortensen; Jesper Nøddesbo; Jannick Green; Lasse Svan Hansen; René Toft Hansen; Henrik Møllgaard; Kasper Søndergaard; Henrik Toft Hansen; Mikkel Hansen; Morten Olsen; Michael Damgaard	France; Olivier Nyokas; Daniel Narcisse; Vincent Gérard; Nikola Karabatic; Kentin Mahé; Mathieu Grébille; Thierry Omeyer; Timothey N'Guessan; Luc Abalo; Cédric Sorhaindo; Michaël Guigou; Luka Karabatic; Ludovic Fabregas; Adrien Dipanda; Valentin Porte	Germany; Uwe Gensheimer; Finn Lemke; Patrick Wiencek; Tobias Reichmann; Fabian Wiede; Silvio Heinevetter; Hendrik Pekeler; Steffen Weinhold; Martin Strobel; Patrick Groetzki; Kai Häfner; Andreas Wolff; Julius Kühn; Christian Dissinger; Paul Drux
2020 Tokyo	France; Luc Abalo; Hugo Descat; Ludovic Fabregas; Yann Genty; Vincent Gérard; Michaël Guigou; Luka Karabatić; Nikola Karabatić; Romain Lagarde; Kentin Mahé; Dika Mem; Timothey N'Guessan; Valentin Porte; Nedim Remili; Melvyn Richardson; Nicolas Tournat	Denmark; Lasse Andersson; Mathias Gidsel; Jóhan Hansen; Mikkel Hansen; Jacob Holm; Emil Jakobsen; Niklas Landin Jacobsen; Magnus Landin Jacobsen; Mads Mensah Larsen; Kevin Møller; Henrik Møllgaard; Morten Olsen; Magnus Saugstrup; Lasse Svan; Henrik Toft Hansen	Spain; Julen Aguinagalde; Rodrigo Corrales; Alex Dujshebaev; Raúl Entrerríos; Ángel Fernández; Adrià Figueras; Antonio García Robledo; Aleix Gómez; Gedeón Guardiola; Eduardo Gurbindo; Jorge Maqueda; Viran Morros; Gonzalo Pérez de Vargas; Miguel Sánchez Migallón; Daniel Sarmiento; Ferran Solé
2024 Paris	Denmark; Niklas Landin Jacobsen; Niclas Kirkeløkke; Magnus Landin Jacobsen; Emil Jakobsen; Rasmus Lauge; Emil Nielsen; Magnus Saugstrup; Hans Lindberg; Mathias Gidsel; Henrik Møllgaard; Mikkel Hansen; Lukas Jørgensen; Lasse Andersson; Simon Hald; Thomas Sommer Arnoldsen; Simon Pytlick	Germany; David Späth; Johannes Golla; Luca Witzke; Sebastian Heymann; Justus Fischer; Juri Knorr; Julian Köster; Renārs Uščins; Kai Häfner; Tim Hornke; Andreas Wolff; Rune Dahmke; Lukas Mertens; Christoph Steinert; Marko Grgić; Jannik Kohlbacher	Spain; Gonzalo Pérez de Vargas; Jorge Maqueda; Alex Dujshebaev; Rodrigo Corrales; Adrià Figueras; Imanol Garciandia; Abel Serdio; Agustín Casado; Aleix Gómez; Ian Tarrafeta; Miguel Sánchez-Migallón; Daniel Dujshebaev; Kauldi Odriozola; Daniel Fernández; Javier Rodríguez Moreno
2028 Los Angeles			
