= Switzerland at the 1936 Summer Olympics =

- IOC code: SUI
- NOC: Swiss Olympic Association

in Berlin
- Competitors: 190 (184 men and 6 women) in 21 sports
- Flag bearer: Paul Martin
- Medals Ranked 16th: Gold 1 Silver 9 Bronze 5 Total 15

Summer Olympics appearances (overview)
- 1896; 1900; 1904; 1908; 1912; 1920; 1924; 1928; 1932; 1936; 1948; 1952; 1956; 1960; 1964; 1968; 1972; 1976; 1980; 1984; 1988; 1992; 1996; 2000; 2004; 2008; 2012; 2016; 2020; 2024

Other related appearances
- 1906 Intercalated Games

Switzerland competed at the 1936 Summer Olympics in Berlin, Germany. 190 competitors, 184 men and 6 women, took part in 100 events in 21 sports.

== Medalists ==
=== Gold ===
- Georges Miez — Gymnastics, Men's Floor Exercises

=== Silver ===
- Arthur Tell Schwab — Athletics, Men's 50 km Walk
- Edgar Buchwalder, Ernst Nievergelt and Kurt Ott — Cycling, Men's Team Road Race
- Eugen Mack — Gymnastics, Men's All-Around Individual
- Michael Reusch — Gymnastics, Men's Parallel Bars
- Eugen Mack — Gymnastics, Men's Long Horse Vault
- Eugen Mack — Gymnastics, Men's Pommeled Horse
- Josef Walter — Gymnastics, Men's Floor Exercises
- Albert Bachmann, Walter Bach, Eugen Mack, Georges Miez, Michael Reusch, and Edi Steinemann — Gymnastics, Men's Team Combined Exercises
- Hermann Betschart, Alex Homberger, Hans Homberger, Karl Schmid, and Rolf Spring — Rowing, Men's Coxed Fours

=== Bronze ===
- Ernst Nievergelt — Cycling, Men's Individual Road Race
- Albert Bachmann — Gymnastics, Men's Pommeled Horse
- Eugen Mack — Gymnastics, Men's Floor Exercises
- Max Bloesch, Rolf Fäs, Willy Gysi, Erland Herkenrath, Ernst Hufschmid, Willy Hufschmid, Werner Meyer, Georg Mischon, Willy Schäfer, Werner Scheurmann, Edy Schmid, Erich Schmitt, Eugen Seiterle, Max Streib, Robert Studer, and Rudolf Wirz — Handball, Men's Team Competition
- Hermann Betschart, Alex Homberger, Hans Homberger, and Karl Schmid — Rowing, Men's Coxless Fours

== Basketball ==
The Swiss men's basketball team finished in 9th= place.

Fernand Bergmann, Pierre Carlier, René Karlen, Georges Laederach, Raymond Lambercy, Jean Paré, John Pollet (also known as Jean Pollet), Marcel Wuilleumier

- Humbert-Louis Bonardelly, Georges Moret, Pascal Ostengo, Henri Peclet and Charles Stettler did not start

== Canoeing ==
Men's K-1 1,000 metres (kayak singles)

- Hans Potthof (6th place, Heat 1)

Men's K-2 1,000 metres (kayak doubles)

- Rudolf Vilim, Werner Klingelfuss (5th)

Men's K-1 10,000 metres (kayak singles)

- Bruno Lips (7th)

Men's K-2 10,000 metres (kayak doubles)

- Werner Zimmermann, Othmar Bach (6th)

Men's folding K-1 10,000 metres (folding kayak singles)

- Hans Mooser (6th)

Men's folding K-2 10,000 metres (folding kayak doubles)

- Eugen Knoblauch, Emil Bottlang (6th)

== Cycling ==
Eleven cyclists, all men, represented Switzerland in 1936.

Individual road race

- Ernst Nievergelt
- Edgar Buchwalder
- Kurt Ott
- Gottlieb Weber

Team road race

- Ernst Nievergelt
- Edgar Buchwalder
- Kurt Ott
- Gottlieb Weber

Sprint

- Werner Wägelin

Time trial

- Edy Baumann

Tandem

- Karl Burkhart
- Fritz Ganz

Team pursuit

- Walter Richli
- Ernst Fuhrimann
- Albert Kägi
- Werner Wägelin

== Diving ==
Men

Athlete	Event	Final	
Athlete	Event	Points	Rank
Frédéric Boeni	3 m springboard	95.84	21
Max Happle	3 m springboard	80.24	23

Women

Athlete	Event	Final	
Athlete	Event	Points	Rank
Annie Villiger	3 m springboard	62.38	14

== Fencing ==
18 fencers, 15 men and 3 women, represented Switzerland in 1936.

Men's foil

- Michel Fauconnet
- Gottfried von Meiss
- Jean Rubli

Men's team foil

- Michel Fauconnet, Édouard Fitting, Jean Rubli, Gottfried von Meiss, Constantin Antoniades

Men's épée

- Frédéric Fitting
- Jean Hauert
- François Duret

Men's team épée

- Jean Hauert, Édouard Fitting, Frédéric Fitting, Edmond Göldlin, Paul de Graffenried, Charles Hauert

Men's sabre

- Adolf Stocker
- Charles Glasstetter
- Alphonse Ruckstuhl

Men's team sabre

- Charles Glasstetter, Alphonse Ruckstuhl, Walter Widemann, Adolf Stocker

Women's foil

- Ingeborg Scheel
- Denise Kramer-Scholer
- Yvonne Bornand

== Handball ==
The Swiss men's handball team finished in 3rd place to win the bronze medal ( Bronze).

Max Bloesch, Rolf Fäs, Burkhard Gantenbein, Willy Gysi, Erland Herkenrath, Ernst Hufschmid, Willy Hufschmid, Werner Meyer, Georg Mischon, Werner Scheurmann, Edy Schmid, Erich Schmitt, Eugen Seiterle, Max Streib, Robert Studer, Willy Schäfer, Rudolf Wirz

- Paul Gerber did not start.

== Modern pentathlon ==
Three male pentathletes represented Switzerland in 1936.

- Karl Wyss
- Willy Grundbacher
- Hans Baumann

== Rowing ==
Switzerland had 16 rowers participate in seven out of seven rowing events in 1936.

Men's single sculls

- Ernst Rufli

Men's double sculls

- Kurt Haas
- Eugen Studach

Men's coxless pair

- Wilhelm Klopfer
- Karl Müller

Men's coxed pair

- Georges Gschwind
- Hans Appenzeller
- Rolf Spring (cox)

Men's coxless four

- Hermann Betschart
- Hans Homberger
- Alex Homberger
- Karl Schmid

Men's coxed four

- Hermann Betschart
- Hans Homberger
- Alex Homberger
- Karl Schmid
- Rolf Spring (cox)

Men's eight

- Werner Schweizer
- Fritz Feldmann
- Rudolf Homberger
- Oskar Neuenschwander
- Hermann Betschart
- Hans Homberger
- Alex Homberger
- Karl Schmid
- Rolf Spring (cox)

== Swimming ==
Men

Ranks given are within the heat.

Athlete	Event	Heat		Semifinal		Final	
Athlete	Event	Time	Rank	Time	Rank	Time	Rank
Roger Zirilli	100 m freestyle	1:04.1	6	Did not advance			
Hans Brenner	400 m freestyle	5:33.8	5	Did not advance			
Werner Lehmann	400 m freestyle	5:36.8	7	Did not advance			

Women

Ranks given are within the heat.

Athlete	Event	Heat		Semifinal		Final	
Athlete	Event	Time	Rank	Time	Rank	Time	Rank
Tenny Wyss	200 m breaststroke	3:31.3	6	Did not advance			
