= List of Olympians killed in World War II =

A total of 411 Olympians are known to have been killed during World War II.

| Name | Country^{A} | Sport(s) | Games | Medals | Ref |
|---|---|---|---|---|---|
| Silvano Abbà | Italy | Modern Pentathlon | 1936 Summer Olympics | 1 Bronze | |
| József Aczél | Hungary | Football | 1924 Summer Olympics | | |
| Stefan Adamczak | Poland | Athletics | 1924 Summer Olympics | | |
| Herbert Adamski | Germany | Rowing | 1936 Summer Olympics | 1 Gold | |
| Estella Agsteribbe | Netherlands | Gymnastics | 1928 Summer Olympics | 1 Gold | |
| Iwao Aizawa | Japan | Athletics | 1928 Summer Olympics | | |
| Abdurahman Ali | Philippines | Swimming | 1932 Summer Olympics | | |
| Arno Almqvist | Russia | Modern Pentathlon, Swimming | 1912 Summer Olympics | | |
| Virgilius Altmann | Austria | Cycling | 1936 Summer Olympics | | |
| Erich Altosaar | Estonia | Basketball | 1936 Summer Olympics | | |
| Max Amann | Germany | Water Polo | 1928 Summer Olympics | | |
| Artur Amon | Estonia | Basketball | 1936 Summer Olympics | | |
| Géo André | France | Athletics | 1908, 1912, 1920, 1924 Summer Olympics | 1 Silver & 1 Bronze | |
| Jan Ankerman | Netherlands | Hockey | 1928 Summer Olympics | 1 Silver | |
| Izuo Anno | Japan | Athletics | 1932 Summer Olympics | | |
| Isakas Anolikas | Lithuania | Cycling | 1924, 1928 Summer Olympics | | |
| Shigeo Arai | Japan | Swimming | 1936 Summer Olympics | 1 Gold & 1 Bronze | |
| Kalle Arantola | Finland | Military Ski Patrol | 1936 Winter Olympics | | |
| Hikoroku Arimoto | Japan | Gymnastics | 1936 Summer Olympics | | |
| Albert Arnheiter | Germany | Rowing | 1912 Summer Olympics | | |
| Jochen Balke | Germany | Swimming | 1936 Summer Olympics | | |
| Ernst Balz | Germany | Sculpture | 1936 Summer Olympics | | |
| Józef Baran-Bilewski | Poland | Athletics | 1928 Summer Olympics | | |
| Luigi Barbesino | Italy | Football | 1912 Summer Olympics | | |
| Franz Barsicke | Germany | Athletics | 1936 Summer Olympics | | |
| Franz Bartl | Austria | Handball | 1936 Summer Olympics | 1 Silver | |
| Helmut Barysz | Poland | Swimming | 1936 Summer Olympics | | |
| Julije Bauer | Yugoslavia | Athletics | 1936 Summer Olympics | | |
| Adolf Baumgarten | Germany | Boxing | 1936 Summer Olympics | | |
| Artur Bäumle | Germany | Athletics | 1936 Summer Olympics | | |
| Karl Bechler | Germany | Athletics | 1908 Summer Olympics | | |
| Martin Beckmann | Germany | Athletics | 1906 Intercalated Games | | |
| Heinrich Bender | Germany | Rowing | 1936 Summer Olympics | | |
| Emil Benecke | Germany | Water polo | 1928, 1936 Summer Olympics | | |
| Alick Bevan | Great Britain | Cycling | 1936 Summer Olympics | | |
| Tjapko van Bergen | Netherlands | Rowing | 1928 Summer Olympics | | |
| Franz Berghammer | Austria | Handball | 1936 Summer Olympics | 1 Silver | |
| Michelangelo Bernasconi | Italy | Rowing | 1928 Summer Olympics | | |
| Hans Bernhardt | Germany | Cycling | 1928 Summer Olympics | 1 Bronze | |
| Herberts Bērtulsons | Latvia | Alpine skiing | 1936 Winter Olympics | | |
| Hasso von Bismarck | Germany | Bobsleigh | 1932 Winter Olympics | | |
| Kazimierz Bocheński | Poland | Swimming | 1936 Summer Olympics | | |
| Kārlis Bone | Latvia | Football | 1924 Summer Olympics | | |
| Werner Böttcher | Germany | Athletics | 1936 Summer Olympics | | |
| Helmut Bonnet | Germany | Athletics | 1936 Summer Olympics | | |
| Béchir Bouazzat | France | Modern pentathlon | 1936 Summer Olympics | | |
| Heinz Brandt | Germany | Equestrian | 1936 Summer Olympics | | |
| József Braun | Hungary | Football | 1924 Summer Olympics | | |
| Franciszek Brożek | Poland | Shooting | 1924 Summer Olympics | | |
| Kęstutis Bulota | Lithuania | Speed skating | 1928 Winter Olympics | | |
| Roger Bureau | Belgium | Ice hockey | 1928, 1936 Winter Olympics | | |
| Wojciech Bursa | Poland | Shooting | 1936 Summer Olympics | | |
| Giuseppe Castelli | Italy | Athletics | 1928, 1932 Summer Olympics | | |
| Simplicio de Castro | Philippines | Boxing | 1936 Summer Olympics | | |
| Ugo Ceccarelli | Italy | Modern pentathlon | 1936 Summer Olympics | | |
| Sulo Cederström | Finland | Shooting | 1936 Summer Olympics | | |
| Antoni Cejzik | Poland | Decathlon | 1924, 1928 Summer Olympics | | |
| Chen Zhenhe | China | Football | 1936 Summer Olympics | | |
| Conrad Cherry | Great Britain | Rowing | 1936 Summer Olympics | | |
| Don Collinge | Canada | Fencing | 1936 Summer Olympics | | |
| George Cooke | New Zealand | Rowing | 1932 Summer Olympics | | |
| Frank Courtney | Canada | Rowing | 1932 Summer Olympics | | |
| Rudi Cranz | Germany | Alpine skiing | 1936 Winter Olympics | | |
| Jacinto Ciria Cruz | Philippines | Basketball | 1936 Summer Olympics | | |
| Ferenc Csík | Hungary | Swimming | 1936 Summer Olympics | | |
| Frank Cuhel | United States | Athletics | 1928 Summer Olympics | | |
| Modeste Cuypers | Belgium | Fencing | 1928 Summer Olympics | | |
| Czesław Cyraniak | Poland | Boxing | 1936 Summer Olympics | | |
| Krystyna Dąbrowska | Poland | Art | 1936 Summer Olympics | | |
| Paweł Dadlez | Poland | Art | 1936 Summer Olympics | | |
| Georg Dascher | Germany | Handball | 1936 Summer Olympics | | |
| René, Baron de Lunden | Belgium | Bobsleigh | 1936 Winter Olympics | 1 Gold | |
| Émile De Schepper | Belgium | Fencing | 1920 Summer Olympics | | |
| Eugen Deutsch | Germany | Fencing | 1936 Summer Olympics | | |
| Émilien Devic | France | Football | 1912 Summer Olympics | | |
| Tivadar Dienes-Öhm | Hungary | Polo | 1936 Summer Olympics | | |
| Jānis Dimza | Latvia | Athletics | 1932, 1936 Summer Olympics | | |
| Henryk Dobrzański | Poland | Equestrian | 1928 Summer Olympics | | |
| Foy Draper | United States | Athletics | 1936 Summer Olympics | 1 Gold | |
| Peter Dulley | Great Britain | Rowing | 1924 Summer Olympics | | |
| Emile Duson | Netherlands | Field hockey | 1928 Summer Olympics | | |
| Zdzisław Dziadulski | Poland | Equestrian | 1924 Summer Olympics | | |
| Heywood L. Edwards | United States | Wrestling | 1928 Summer Olympics | | |
| Eduard Eelma | Estonia | Football | 1924 Summer Olympics | | |
| Gerhard Egger | Austria | Equestrian | 1936 Summer Olympics | | |
| Hans Eller | Germany | Rowing | 1932 Summer Olympics | | |
| Eduard Ellmann | Estonia | Football | 1924 Summer Olympics | | |
| František Erben | Bohemia | Gymnastics | 1900 Summer Olympics | | |
| Linn Farish | United States | Rugby | 1924 Summer Olympics | | |
| Billy Fiske | United States | Bobsleigh | 1928, 1932 Winter Olympics | | |
| Robert Fleig | France | Rowing | 1920 Summer Olympics | | |
| Viktor Flessl | Austria | Rowing | 1928 Summer Olympics | | |
| Walter Flinsch | Germany | Rowing | 1928 Summer Olympics | | |
| Hans Fokker | Netherlands | Sailing | 1928 Summer Olympics | | |
| Miroslav Forte | Yugoslavia | Gymnastics | 1936 Summer Olympics | | |
| Hans Freese | Germany | Swimming | 1936 Summer Olympics | | |
| Stefan Fryc | Poland | Football | 1924 Summer Olympics | | |
| Metod Gaberšček | Yugoslavia | Canoeing | 1936 Summer Olympics | | |
| Peter Hunter Gaskell | Great Britain | Rowing | 1936 Summer Olympics | | |
| Jenő Gáspár | Hungary | Athletics | 1924 Summer Olympics | | |
| Alexander van Geen | Netherlands | Modern pentathlon | 1936 Summer Olympics | | |
| Günter Gehmert | Germany | Athletics | 1936 Summer Olympics | | |
| Josef Genschieder | Austria | Cycling | 1936 Summer Olympics | | |
| Wolfgang Goedecke | Germany | Rowing | 1928 Summer Olympics | | |
| Otoniel Gonzaga | Philippines | Shooting | 1936 Summer Olympics | | |
| Alfred Graaf | Germany | Boxing | 1936 Summer Olympics | | |
| Félix Grimonprez | France | Field hockey | 1928, 1936 Summer Olympics | | |
| Josef Gumpold | Germany | Nordic combined | 1936 Winter Olympics | | |
| Nemesio de Guzman | Philippines | Athletics | 1936 Summer Olympics | | |
| Ru van der Haar | Netherlands | Field hockey | 1936 Summer Olympics | 1 Bronze | |
| Frederick Habberfield | Great Britain | Cycling | 1924 Summer Olympics | | |
| Emil Hagelberg | Finland | Modern pentathlon | 1920, 1924 Summer Olympics | | |
| David Haig-Thomas | Great Britain | Rowing | 1932 Summer Olympics | | |
| Saul Hallap | Estonia | Weightlifting | 1924 Summer Olympics | | |
| Helmut Hamann | Germany | Athletics | 1936 Summer Olympics | | |
| Hannes Hansen | Germany | Handball | 1936 Summer Olympics | | |
| Rudolf Harbig | Germany | Athletics | 1936 Summer Olympics | | |
| Walter Hasenfus | United States | Canoeing | 1936 Summer Olympics | | |
| Josef Hasenöhrl | Austria | Rowing | 1936 Summer Olympics | | |
| Franz Haslberger | Germany | Ski jumping | 1936 Winter Olympics | | |
| Kurt Hasse | Germany | Equestrian | 1936 Summer Olympics | | |
| Hermann Heibel | Germany | Swimming | 1936 Summer Olympics | | |
| Albert Heijnneman | Netherlands | Athletics | 1920 Summer Olympics | | |
| Fritz Hendrix | Germany | Athletics | 1932 Summer Olympics | | |
| Julius Hirsch | Germany | Football | 1912 Summer Olympics | | |
| Tommy Hitchcock Jr. | United States | Polo | 1924 Summer Olympics | 1 Silver | |
| Jadwiga Hładki | Poland | Art | 1932 Summer Olympics | | |
| Gunnar Höckert | Finland | Athletics | 1936 Summer Olympics | 1 Gold | |
| Hans Hoffmann | Germany | Cycling | 1936 Summer Olympics | | |
| Christian Holzenberg | Germany | Canoeing | 1936 Summer Olympics | | |
| Xaver Hörmann | Germany | Canoeing | 1936 Summer Olympics | | |
| Gösta Horn | Sweden | Diving | 1928 Summer Olympics | | |
| Václav Hošek | Czechoslovakia | Athletics | 1936 Summer Olympics | | |
| Robert Huber | Germany | Rowing | 1928 Summer Olympics | | |
| Milutin Ivković | Yugoslavia | Football | 1928 Summer Olympics | | |
| Mozes Jacobs | Netherlands | Gymnastics | 1928 Summer Olympics | | |
| Adolf Jäger | Germany | Football | 1912 Summer Olympics | | |
| Kalle Jalkanen | Finland | Cross-country skiing | 1936 Winter Olympics | | |
| Edmund Jankowski | Poland | Rowing | 1928 Summer Olympics | | |
| Akilles Järvinen | Finland | Athletics | 1928, 1932, 1936 Summer Olympics | | |
| Kalle Järvinen | Finland | Athletics | 1928, 1932 Summer Olympics | | |
| Józef Jaworski | Poland | Athletics | 1924, 1928 Summer Olympics | | |
| Jerzy Jełowicki | Poland | Art | 1936 Summer Olympics | | |
| René Joannes-Powell | Belgium | Athletics | 1920, 1924, 1928 Summer Olympics | | |
| Birger Johansson | Finland | Canoeing | 1936 Summer Olympics | | |
| Emil Juracka | Austria | Handball | 1936 Summer Olympics | 1 Silver | |
| Henry Jurado | Philippines | Wrestling | 1936 Summer Olympics | | |
| Harald Kaarman | Estonia | Football | 1924 Summer Olympics | | |
| Endre Kabos | Hungary | Fencing | 1932, 1936 Summer Olympics | 3 Golds & 1 Bronze | |
| Josef Kahl | Czechoslovakia | Ski jumping | 1936 Winter Olympics | | |
| Eddy Kahn | Netherlands | Equestrian | 1936 Summer Olympics | | |
| Kalle Kainuvaara | Finland | Diving; Modern pentathlon | 1912, 1920 Summer Olympics | | |
| Ted Kara | United States | Boxing | 1936 Summer Olympics | | |
| Władysław Karaś | Poland | Shooting | 1936 Summer Olympics | | |
| Martin Karl | Germany | Rowing | 1936 Summer Olympics | | |
| Otto Kaundynia | Germany | Handball (coach) | 1936 Summer Olympics | 1 Gold | |
| Tatsugo Kawaishi | Japan | Swimming | 1932 Summer Olympics | | |
| Zdzisław Kawecki | Poland | Equestrian | 1936 Summer Olympics | | |
| Reinhold Kesküll | Estonia | Athletics | 1924 Summer Olympics | | |
| Lauri Kettunen | Finland | Fencing; Modern pentathlon | 1928, 1932, 1936 Summer Olympics | | |
| Ferdinand Kiefler | Austria | Handball | 1936 Summer Olympics | 1 Silver | |
| Alfred Kienzle | Germany | Water Polo | 1936 Summer Olympics | 1 Silver | |
| Jaan Kikkas | Estonia | Weightlifting | 1924 Summer Olympics | | |
| Desmond Kingsford | Great Britain | Rowing | 1936 Summer Olympics | | |
| Aaro Kiviperä | Finland | Modern pentathlon | 1936 Summer Olympics | | |
| Kārlis Kļava | Latvia | Shooting | 1936 Summer Olympics | | |
| Józef Klotz | Poland | Football | 1924 Summer Olympics | | |
| Józef Klukowski | Poland | Art | 1932, 1936 Summer Olympics | 1 Gold & 1 Silver | |
| Artur Knautz | Germany | Handball | 1936 Summer Olympics | 1 Gold | |
| Erland Koch | Germany | Shooting | 1912 Summer Olympics | | |
| Karl Koch | Germany | Cycling | 1928 Summer Olympics | | |
| Yasuhiko Kojima | Japan | Swimming | 1936 Summer Olympics | | |
| August Kop | Netherlands | Field hockey | 1928 Summer Olympics | | |
| Dora Köring | Germany | Tennis | 1912 Summer Olympics | | |
| Elmar Korko | Estonia | Rowing | 1936 Summer Olympics | | |
| Kurt Körner | Germany | Ski jumping | 1936 Winter Olympics | | |
| Heinz Körvers | Germany | Handball | 1936 Summer Olympics | 1 Gold | |
| Lauri Koskela | Finland | Wrestling | 1932, 1936 Summer Olympics | | |
| Karl Kotratschek | Austria | Athletics | 1936 Summer Olympics | | |
| Aleksander Kowalski | Poland | Ice hockey | 1928, 1932 Winter Olympics | | |
| Marian Kozłowski | Poland | Canoeing | 1936 Summer Olympics | | |
| Paul Kraus | Germany | Ski jumping | 1936 Winter Olympics | | |
| Helmut Krause | Germany | Athletics | 1928 Summer Olympics | | |
| Elli von Kropiwnicki | Austria | Swimming | 1936 Summer Olympics | | |
| Leonhard Kukk | Estonia | Weightlifting | 1928 Summer Olympics | | |
| Ernst Künz | Austria | Football | 1936 Summer Olympics | | |
| Willi Kürten | Germany | Athletics | 1936 Summer Olympics | | |
| Stanisław Kuryłłowicz | Poland | Rowing | 1936 Summer Olympics | | |
| Albert Kusnets | Estonia | Wrestling | 1924, 1928 Summer Olympics | | |
| Janusz Kusociński | Poland | Athletics | 1932 Summer Olympics | 1 Gold | |
| Aksel Kuuse | Estonia | Athletics | 1936 Summer Olympics | | |
| Harvey Lacelle | Canada | Boxing | 1936 Summer Olympics | | |
| Frits Lamp | Netherlands | Athletics | 1924 Summer Olympics | | |
| John Lander | Great Britain | Rowing | 1928 Summer Olympics | | |
| Fritz Landertinger | Austria | Canoeing | 1936 Summer Olympics | | |
| Johann Langmayr | Austria | Athletics | 1936 Summer Olympics | | |
| Martti Lappalainen | Finland | Cross-country skiing | 1928, 1932 Winter Olympics | | |
| Karl Leban | Austria | Modern pentathlon Speed skating | 1936 S, 1936 W | | |
| Gaston Le Clercq | Belgium | Athletics | 1924 Summer Olympics | | |
| Julien Lehouck | Belgium | Athletics | 1920 Summer Olympics | | |
| Wilhelm Leichum | Germany | Athletics | 1936 Summer Olympics | | |
| Albert Leidmann | Germany | Boxing | 1928 Summer Olympics | | |
| František Leikert | Czechoslovakia | Diving | 1936 Summer Olympics | | |
| Ludwig Leinberger | Germany | Football | 1928 Summer Olympics | | |
| Hermann Lemp | Germany | Modern pentathlon | 1936 Summer Olympics | | |
| Karel Lescrauwaet | Belgium | Boxing | 1936 Summer Olympics | | |
| Herbert Leupold | Germany | Cross-country skiing | 1936 Summer Olympics | | |
| Gusztáv Lifkai | Hungary | Field hockey | 1936 Summer Olympics | | |
| David Lindsay | New Zealand | Swimming | 1928 Summer Olympics | | |
| Rudolf Lippert | Germany | Equestrian | 1928, 1936 Summer Olympics | | |
| Emil Lohbeck | Germany | Basketball | 1936 Summer Olympics | | |
| Eugeniusz Lokajski | Poland | Athletics | 1936 Summer Olympics | | |
| Luz Long | Germany | Athletics | 1936 Summer Olympics | 1 Silver | |
| Leszek Lubicz-Nycz | Poland | Fencing | 1932 Summer Olympics | 1 Bronze | |
| Jaakko Luoma | Finland | Athletics | 1924 Summer Olympics | | |
| Jeffrey MacDougall | Great Britain | Modern pentathlon | 1932, 1936 Summer Olympics | | |
| Gustav Mader | Austria | Bobsleigh | 1928 Winter Olympics | | |
| Hans Maier | Germany | Rowing | 1928, 1932, 1936 Summer Olympics | | |
| Jarl Malmgren | Finland | Football | 1936 Summer Olympics | | |
| Clayton Mansfield | United States | Modern pentathlon | 1936 Summer Olympics | | |
| François Marits | Netherlands | Shooting | 1924 Summer Olympics | | |
| Antonio Marovelli | Italy | Gymnastics | 1920 Summer Olympics | | |
| Hans Marr | Germany | Ski jumping | 1936 Winter Olympics | | |
| Martti Marttelin | Finland | Athletics | 1928 Summer Olympics | | |
| Antoni Maszewski | Poland | Athletics | 1936 Summer Olympics | | |
| Akira Matsunaga | Japan | Football | 1936 Summer Olympics | | |
| D'Arcy McCrea | Ireland | Tennis | 1924 Summer Olympics | | |
| Johan Meimer | Estonia | Athletics | 1928 Summer Olympics | | |
| Visvaldis Melderis | Latvia | Basketball | 1936 Summer Olympics | | |
| Willi Menne | Germany | Rowing | 1936 Summer Olympics | | |
| Ewald Menzl | Czechoslovakia | Bobsleigh | 1936 Summer Olympics | | |
| Toni Merkens | Germany | Cycling | 1936 Summer Olympics | | |
| Fernand Mermoud | France | Cross-country skiing | 1936 Winter Olympics | | |
| Fritz Meßner | Germany | Field hockey | 1936 Summer Olympics | | |
| Konrad Miersch | Germany | Modern pentathlon | 1932 Summer Olympics | | |
| Jovan Mikić | Yugoslavia | Athletics | 1936 Summer Olympics | | |
| Josef Miner | Germany | Boxing | 1936 Summer Olympics | | |
| Tsutomu Mitsudome | Japan | Rowing | 1936 Summer Olympics | | |
| Aleksander Mitt | Estonia | Speed skating | 1928, 1932, 1936 Winter Olympics | | |
| Nicolaas Moerloos | Belgium | Gymnastics; Weightlifting | 1920, 1924 Summer Olympics | | |
| Ernst Moltzer | Netherlands | Sailing | 1936 Summer Olympics | | |
| Élie Monnier | France | Shooting | 1936 Summer Olympics | | |
| Eugen Mühlberger | Germany | Weightlifting | 1928 Summer Olympics | | |
| Michael Murach | Germany | Boxing | 1936 Summer Olympics | | |
| Jack Murdoch | Canada | Rowing | 1928 Summer Olympics | 1 Bronze | |
| Camillo Mussi | Italy | Ice hockey | 1936 Winter Olympics | | |
| Eiichi Nakamura | Japan | Field hockey | 1932 Summer Olympics | | |
| Helmut Naudé | Germany | Modern pentathlon | 1932 Summer Olympics | | |
| Takeichi Nishi | Japan | Equestrian | 1932 Summer Olympics | 1 Gold | |
| Jules Noël | France | Athletics | 1928, 1932, 1936 Summer Olympics | | |
| Mauri Noroma | Finland | Gymnastics | 1928, 1932, 1936 Summer Olympics | | |
| Amador Obordo | Philippines | Basketball | 1936 Summer Olympics | | |
| Sueo Ōe | Japan | Gymnastics | 1936 Summer Olympics | 1 Bronze | |
| Kurt Oleska | Germany | Basketball | 1936 Summer Olympics | | |
| Heinrich Paal | Estonia | Football | 1924 Summer Olympics | | |
| Charley Paddock | United States | Athletics | 1920, 1924, 1928 Summer Olympics | 2 Golds & 2 Silvers | |
| Edmund Pader | Austria | Swimming | 1936 Summer Olympics | | |
| Karl Panos | Austria | Gymnastics | 1936 Summer Olympics | | |
| Fritz Pellkofer | Germany | Cycling | 1928 Summer Olympics | | |
| Arvo Peussa | Finland | Athletics | 1924 Summer Olympics | | |
| Remo Piana | Italy | Basketball | 1936 Summer Olympics | | |
| Werner Plath | Germany | Swimming | 1936 Summer Olympics | | |
| Otto Pohla | Estonia | Wrestling | 1928 Summer Olympics | | |
| Siegfried Powolny | Austria | Handball | 1936 Summer Olympics | 1 Silver | |
| Siegfried Purner | Austria | Handball | 1936 Summer Olympics | 1 Silver | |
| Willi Reinfrank | Germany | Weightlifting | 1928 Summer Olympics | | |
| Toivo Reingoldt | Finland | Swimming | 1932 Summer Olympics | | |
| Wilhelm Rietschel | Germany | Art | 1936 Summer Olympics | | |
| Frederick Riley | Great Britain | Football | 1936 Summer Olympics | | |
| Marsilio Rossi | Italy | Athletics | 1936 Summer Olympics | | |
| Georgina Roty | France | Swimming | 1928 Summer Olympics | | |
| Richard Sahla | Germany | Equestrian | 1928 Summer Olympics | | |
| Giyo Saito | Japan | Swimming | 1924 Summer Olympics | | |
| Heinz Sames | Germany | Speed skating | 1936 Winter Olympics | | |
| Felix Scheder-Bieschin | Germany | Sailing | 1936 Summer Olympics | | |
| Hans Scheele | Germany | Athletics | 1936 Summer Olympics | | |
| Adolf Scheffknecht | Austria | Gymnastics | 1936 Summer Olympics | | |
| Günther von Scheven | Germany | Art | 1936 Summer Olympics | | |
| Heinz Schlauch | Germany | Swimming | 1936 Summer Olympics | | |
| Alfred Schmalzer | Austria | Handball | 1936 Summer Olympics | 1 Silver | |
| Eugen Schnalek | Austria | Cycling | 1936 Summer Olympics | | |
| Hans Schönrath | Germany | Boxing | 1928 Summer Olympics | | |
| Koos Schouwenaar | Netherlands | Rowing | 1928 Summer Olympics | | |
| Jakob Schüller | Germany | Athletics | 1928 Summer Olympics | | |
| Arthur Tell Schwab | Switzerland | Athletics | 1924, 1928, 1932, 1936 Summer Olympics | | |
| Ludwig Schweickert | Germany | Wrestling | 1936 Summer Olympics | | |
| Karl Schwitalle | Germany | Weightlifting | 1936 Summer Olympics | | |
| Jos Seckel | Netherlands | Art | 1928, 1932 Summer Olympics | | |
| Werner Seelenbinder | Germany | Wrestling | 1936 Summer Olympics | | |
| Katsumi Shibata | Japan | Field hockey | 1932 Summer Olympics | | |
| Evald Sikk | Estonia | Wrestling | 1936 Summer Olympics | | |
| Otto Silber | Estonia | Football | 1924 Summer Olympics | | |
| Farid Simaika | Egypt | Diving | 1928 Summer Olympics | | |
| Harry Simmons | Great Britain | Athletics | 1928 Summer Olympics | | |
| Tadeusz Sokołowski | Poland | Equestrian | 1936 Summer Olympics | | |
| Bruno Sorich | Italy | Rowing | 1924 Summer Olympics | 1 Bronze | |
| Werner Spannagel | Germany | Boxing | 1932 Summer Olympics | | |
| Sonny Spencer | Great Britain | Athletics | 1924 Summer Olympics | | |
| Leon Sperling | Poland | Football | 1924 Summer Olympics | | |
| Marian Spojda | Poland | Football | 1924 Summer Olympics | | |
| Tomasz Stankiewicz | Poland | Cycling | 1924 Summer Olympics | | |
| Hugo Strauß | Germany | Rowing | 1936 Summer Olympics | | |
| Ludwig Stubbendorff | Germany | Equestrian | 1936 Summer Olympics | | |
| Karl Sudrich | Austria | Fencing | 1936 Summer Olympics | | |
| Gustav Sule | Estonia | Athletics | 1936 Summer Olympics | | |
| Bunta Suzuki | Japan | Athletics | 1936 Summer Olympics | | |
| Fusashige Suzuki | Japan | Athletics | 1936 Summer Olympics | | |
| Hildegarde Švarce | Latvia | Figure skating | 1936 Winter Olympics | | |
| Stanislaw Swietochowski | Poland | Athletics | 1924 Summer Olympics | | |
| Jozef Szajba | Poland | Sailing | 1936 Summer Olympics | | |
| Jozef Szawara | Poland | Rowing | 1924 Summer Olympics | | |
| Henryk Szlązak | Poland | Wrestling | 1936 Summer Olympics | | |
| Ilia Szrajbman | Poland | Swimming | 1936 Summer Olympics | | |
| Georges Tainturier | France | Fencing | 1924, 1932 Summer Olympics | 2 Golds | |
| Harald Tammer | Estonia | Athletics; Weightlifting | 1920, 1924 Summer Olympics | | |
| Mutsuo Taniguchi | Japan | Athletics | 1936 Summer Olympics | | |
| Hugh Thomson | Canada | Athletics | 1936 Summer Olympics | | |
| John Thornton | Great Britain | Athletics | 1936 Summer Olympics | | |
| Raymond Tixier | France | Field hockey | 1936 Summer Olympics | | |
| Freddie Tomlins | Great Britain | Figure skating | 1936 Winter Olympics | | |
| Martti Topelius-Tolamo | Finland | Athletics | 1928, 1932, 1936 Summer Olympics | | |
| Rudolf Trenkwitz | Austria | Equestrian | 1936 Summer Olympics | | |
| Masayoshi Uchida | Japan | Diving; Swimming | 1920 Summer Olympics | | |
| Tokutaro Ukon | Japan | Football | 1936 Summer Olympics | | |
| Martti Uosikkinen | Finland | Gymnastics | 1928, 1932, 1936 Summer Olympics | | |
| Ala Urban | Germany | Football | 1936 Summer Olympics | | |
| Stanisław Urban | Poland | Rowing | 1928, 1932 Summer Olympics | | |
| Eugen Uuemaa | Estonia | Athletics | 1924 Summer Olympics | | |
| Aleksey Uversky | Russia | Football | 1912 Summer Olympics | | |
| Ladislav Vácha | Czechoslovakia | Gymnastics | 1920, 1924, 1928 Summer Olympics | | |
| Antal Vágó | Hungary | Football | 1912 Summer Olympics | | |
| Johannes van der Vegte | Netherlands | Rowing | 1920 Summer Olympics | | |
| Heino Veskila | Estonia | Basketball | 1936 Summer Olympics | | |
| Tola Vologe | France | Field hockey | 1936 Summer Olympics | | |
| Fidel Wagner | Germany | Nordic combined | 1936 Winter Olympics | | |
| Karl Wahlmüller | Austria | Football | 1936 Summer Olympics | | |
| Sadao Wakizaka | Japan | Field hockey | 1936 Summer Olympics | | |
| Tapio Wartiovaara | Finland | Shooting | 1936 Summer Olympics | | |
| Birger Wasenius | Finland | Speed skating | 1936 Summer Olympics | | |
| Sigurd Wathne | Norway | Football | 1920 Summer Olympics | | |
| Eddie Webster | Great Britain | Athletics | 1924 Summer Olympics | | |
| Erwin Wegner | Germany | Athletics | 1932, 1936 Summer Olympics | | |
| Walter Werginz | Austria | Football | 1936 Summer Olympics | | |
| Miguel White | Philippines | Athletics | 1936 Summer Olympics | 1 Bronze | |
| John Wodehouse, 3rd Earl of Kimberley | Great Britain | Polo | 1908, 1920 Summer Olympics | 1 Gold & 1 Silver | |
| Hans Woellke | Germany | Athletics | 1936 Summer Olympics | | |
| Heinz Wöllner | Germany | Athletics | 1936 Summer Olympics | | |
| Paul Wormser | France | Fencing | 1936 Summer Olympics | | |
| Matthias Wörndle | Germany | Cycling | 1936 Summer Olympics | | |
| Jan Wrzosek | Poland | Shooting | 1936 Summer Olympics | | |
| Mikhail Yakovlev | Russia | Football | 1912 Summer Olympics | | |
| Teófilo Yldefonso | Philippines | Swimming | 1928, 1932 Summer Olympics | 2 Bronzes | |
| Kiichi Yoshida | Japan | Swimming | 1936 Summer Olympics | | |
| Hans Zehetner | Austria | Handball | 1936 Summer Olympics | 1 Silver | |
| Günther Zobernig | Austria | Swimming | 1936 Summer Olympics | | |
| Mario Zorzi | Italy | Shooting | 1932, 1936 Summer Olympics | | |
| Feliks Żuber | Poland | Athletics | 1928 Summer Olympics | | |

== Olympians who died in Nazi-occupied concentration camps ==
A total of 64 Olympians have been known to have died in Nazi-occupied concentration camps.

| Name | Country^{A} | Sport(s) | Games | Medals | Ref |
|---|---|---|---|---|---|
| Stella Agsteribbe | Netherlands | Gymnastics | 1928 Summer Olympics | | |
| László Bartók | Hungary | Rowing | 1924, 1928 Summer Olympics | | |
| Thierry de Briey | Belgium | Equestrian | 1920 Summer Olympics | | |
| Józef Broel-Plater | Poland | Bobsleigh | 1928 Winter Olympics | | |
| Josef Charous | Czechoslovakia | Equestrian | 1924, 1928 Summer Olympics | | |
| Cornelis Compter | Netherlands | Weightlifting | 1928 Summer Olympics | | |
| Bronisław Czech | Poland | Various skiing disciplines | 1928, 1932, 1936 Winter Olympics | | |
| František Fišer | Czechoslovakia | Weightlifting | 1924 Summer Olympics | | |
| Alfred Flatow | Germany | Athletics; Gymnastics | 1896 Summer Olympics | | |
| Gustav Flatow | Germany | Athletics; Gymnastics | 1896, 1900 Summer Olympics | | |
| Fritz Fleischer | Austria | Athletics | 1912 Summer Olympics | | |
| János Garay | Hungary | Fencing | 1924, 1928 Summer Olympics | 1 Gold, 1 Silver, 1 Bronze | |
| Oszkár Gerde | Hungary | Fencing | 1908, 1912 Summer Olympics | 2 Gold | |
| František Getreuer | Czechoslovakia | Water polo | 1928 Summer Olympics | | |
| Isidore Goudeket | Netherlands | Gymnastics | 1908 Summer Olympics | | |
| Győző Halmos | Hungary | Gymnastics | 1912 Summer Olympics | | |
| Karel Hartmann | Czechoslovakia | Ice hockey | 1920 Summer Olympics | 1 Bronze | |
| Oskar Hekš | Czechoslovakia | Athletics | 1932 Summer Olympics | | |
| Otto Herschmann | Austria | Fencing; Swimming | 1896, 1912, 1924 Summer Olympics | 2 Silver | |
| Felix Hess | Netherlands | Art competitions | 1928 Summer Olympics | | |
| Julius Hirsch | Germany | Football | 1912 Summer Olympics | | |
| Pierre Hirsch | France | Tennis | 1920 Summer Olympics | | |
| Milutin Ivković | Yugoslavia | Football | 1928 Summer Olympics | | |
| Mozes Jacobs | Netherlands | Gymnastics | 1928 Summer Olympics | | |
| Jiři Jesenský | Czechoslovakia | Fencing | 1936 Summer Olympics | | |
| Roman Kantor | Poland | Fencing | 1936 Summer Olympics | | |
| Józef Krudowski | Poland | Art competitions | 1932 Summer Olympics | | |
| Julien Lehouck | Belgium | Athletics | 1920 Summer Olympics | | |
| Elias Melkman | Netherlands | Gymnastics | 1928 Summer Olympics | | |
| Lion van Minden | Netherlands | Fencing | 1908 Summer Olympics | | |
| Abraham Mok | Netherlands | Gymnastics | 1908 Summer Olympics | | |
| Bart Mollin | Belgium | Wrestling | 1924 Summer Olympics | | |
| Jacob van Moppes | Netherlands | Wrestling | 1908 Summer Olympics | | |
| Vojtech Neményi | Czechoslovakia | Water polo | 1924 Summer Olympics | | |
| Józef Noji | Poland | Athletics | 1928 Summer Olympics | | |
| Lea Nordheim | Netherlands | Gymnastics | 1928 Summer Olympics | | |
| Simon Okker | Netherlands | Fencing | 1908 Summer Olympics | | |
| Abraham de Oliveira | Netherlands | Gymnastics | 1908 Summer Olympics | | |
| František Pecháček | Czechoslovakia | Gymnastics | 1920 Summer Olympics | | |
| Attila Petschauer | Hungary | Fencing | 1928, 1932 Summer Olympics | 2 Golds & 1 Silver | |
| Ans Polak | Netherlands | Gymnastics | 1928 Summer Olympics | | |
| Marcel Pourchier | France | Military ski patrol | 1928 Winter Olympics | | |
| Jiři Reitmann | Czechoslovakia | Water polo | 1924 Summer Olympics | | |
| Paolo Salvi | Italy | Gymnastics | 1912, 1920 Summer Olympics | 2 Gold | |
| Richard Schoenmaker | Netherlands | Fencing | 1908 Summer Olympics | | |
| Werner Seelenbinder | Germany | Wrestling | 1936 Summer Olympics | | |
| Jonas Slier | Netherlands | Gymnastics | 1908 Summer Olympics | | |
| András Székely | Hungary | Swimming | 1932 Summer Olympics | | |
| Bogdan Tošovic | Yugoslavia | Water polo | 1936 Summer Olympics | | |
| Ernest Toussaint | Luxembourg | Boxing | 1936 Summer Olympics | | |
| Alexei Uversky | Russia | Football | 1912 Summer Olympics | | |
| Martial Van Schelle | Belgium | Bobsleigh; Swimming | 1920, 1924, 1928, 1936 Winter Olympics | | |
| Edmond Vanwaes | Belgium | Rowing | 1912 Summer Olympics | | |
| Pierre Versteegh | Netherlands | Equestrian | 1928, 1932, 1936 Summer Olympics | | |
| Lorenzo Vitria | Spain | Boxing | 1924 Summer Olympics | | |
| Karl Wahlmuller | Austria | Football | 1936 Summer Olympics | 1 Silver | |
| Hans van Walsem | Netherlands | Rowing | 1936 Summer Olympics | | |
| Rémi Weil | France | Diving; Swimming | 1920, 1924 Summer Olympics | | |
| Árpád Weisz | Hungary | Football | 1924 Summer Olympics | | |
| Gerardus van der Wel | Netherlands | Athletics | 1920 Summer Olympics | | |
| Walter Werginz | Austria | Football | 1936 Summer Olympics | 1 Silver | |
| Israel Wijnschenk | Netherlands | Gymnastics | 1928 Summer Olympics | | |

== Notes ==
A.The country the individual competed for at the time.
