= Dauner =

Dauner is a surname. Notable people with the surname include:

- Charles Dauner (1912–1993), American handball player
- Marvin Dauner (1927–2010), American farmer and politician
- Wolfgang Dauner (1935–2020), German jazz pianist

== See also ==
- Dauner–Akkon, German UCI Continental team founded in 2017
