= Oehmichen =

Oehmichen is a surname, likely of French origin. Notable people with the surname include:

- Étienne Oehmichen (1884–1955), French engineer and helicopter designer
- Herbert Oehmichen (1915–1990), American handball player
- Isabelle Oehmichen (born 1961), French classical pianist
