= Friedrich Maurer =

Friedrich Maurer may refer to:

- Friedrich Maurer (linguist) (1898–1984), German linguist and medievalist
- Friedrich Maurer (handballer) (1912–1958), Austrian field handball player
