= Robert Speck =

Robert Speck may refer to:

- Robert Speck (handballer) (1909–1979), Romanian field handball player
- Robert Speck (politician) (1915–1972), first mayor of the Town of Mississauga, Ontario
