= Antal Benda =

Hungarian handball player (1910–1997)

Antal Benda (14 April 1910 – 29 January 1997) was a Hungarian field handball player who competed in the 1936 Summer Olympics. He was born in Palánka in what is today the South Bačka District of Serbia. He competed in the 1936 Summer Olympics as part of the Hungarian field handball team, which finished fourth in the Olympic tournament. He played four matches. He died on 29 January 1997 in Budapest, Hungary.
