= János Koppány =

Hungarian handball player (1908–1975)

János Koppány (13 February 1908 – 1975) was a Hungarian field handball player who competed in the 1936 Summer Olympics. He was part of the Hungarian field handball team, which finished fourth in the Olympic tournament. He played four matches.
