= Edward Hagen (handballer) =

American handball player

Personal information
- Full name: Edward Christian John Hagen
- Nationality: United States
- Born: 4 March 1908 Philadelphia, United States
- Died: 16 August 1963 (aged 55) Philadelphia, United States

Sport
- Sport: Handball

Senior clubs
- Years: Team
- ?-?: Cake Bakers Sport Club
National team
Years	Team	Apps	(Gls)
?-?	United States	2	(0)
- Updated on only during the 1936 Summer Olympics

Edward Christian John Hagen (March 4, 1908 - August 16, 1963) was an American male handball player. He was a member of the United States men's national handball team. He was part of the team at the 1936 Summer Olympics, playing 2 matches. On club level he played for Cake Bakers Sport Club in the United States.
