= Tibor Máté =

Hungarian handball player (born 1914)

Tibor Máté (born December 14, 1914, date of death unknown) was a Hungarian field handball player who competed in the 1936 Summer Olympics. He was part of the Hungarian field handball team, which finished fourth in the Olympic tournament. He played two matches as goalkeeper.
