= Hans Georg Herzog =

Romanian handball player (1915-2014)

Hans Georg Herzog (May 7, 1915 – July 28, 2014) was a Romanian field handball player of German origin who competed in the 1936 Summer Olympics. He was part of the Romanian field handball team, which finished fifth in the Olympic tournament. He played one match. Herzog died in July 2014 at the age of 99.
