= Lőrinc Galgóczi =

Hungarian handball player (1911–1972)

Lőrinc Galgóczi (24 September 1911 – April 1972) was a Hungarian field handball player who competed in the 1936 Summer Olympics. He was part of the Hungarian field handball team, which finished fourth in the Olympic tournament. He played three matches.
