= Sándor Szomori =

Hungarian handball player (1910–1989)

Sándor Szomori (also known as Sándor Strosz; German: Sandor Stroß, November 6, 1910 in Budapest – October 27, 1989 in Budapest) was a Hungarian field handball player who competed in the 1936 Summer Olympics. He was part of the Hungarian field handball team, which finished fourth in the Olympic tournament. He played three matches.
