= Gyula Takács =

Hungarian handball player (1914–1974)

Gyula István Takács (September 4, 1914 – February 23, 1974) was a Hungarian field handball player who competed in the 1936 Summer Olympics. He was part of the Hungarian field handball team, which finished fourth in the Olympic tournament. He played four matches.
