= Endre Salgó =

Hungarian handball player (1913–1945)

Endre Salgó (11 December 1913 – 1945) was a Hungarian field handball player who competed in the 1936 Summer Olympics.

He was born and died in Budapest.

Salgó was part of the Hungarian field handball team, which finished fourth in the Olympic tournament. He played three matches.
