= Handball at the 1936 Summer Olympics =

- Handball pictogram

Tournament details
- Host country: Germany
- Venues: 3 (in 1 host city)
- Dates: 6–14 August 1936
- Teams: 6

Final positions
- Champions: Germany (1st title)
- Runners-up: Austria
- Third place: Switzerland
- Fourth place: Hungary

Tournament statistics
- Matches played: 13
- Goals scored: 239 (18.38 per match)
- Top scorers: (Germany) Hans Theilig (22 goals)

Field handball at the 1936 Summer Olympics was the first appearance of the sport at the Olympics. It was contested by six teams. Games were played outdoors with 11 players on each side.

The six teams were split into two groups of three. Each team played each other within each group. The top two teams in each group advanced to the final round, while the third-ranked teams played each other for fifth and sixth places. In the final round, each team played each other. Final rankings were based on the records of each team in those three games.

== Participating nations ==
Each country was allowed to enter a team of 22 players and they all were eligible for participation.

A total of 107(*) field handball players from 6 nations competed at the Berlin Games:

- Austria (22)
- Germany (22)
- Hungary (16 – from a squad of 21)
- Romania (15 – from a squad of 20)
- Switzerland (17 – from a squad of 18)
- United States (13 – from a squad of 14)

(*) NOTE: Only players that participated in at least one game are counted.

Not all reserve players are known.

== Medallists ==
Gold	Silver	Bronze
Germany Willy Bandholz; Wilhelm Baumann; Helmut Berthold; Helmut Braselmann; Wilhelm Brinkmann; Georg Dascher; Kurt Dossin; Fritz Fromm; Hermann Hansen; Erich Herrmann; Heinrich Keimig; Hans Keiter; Alfred Klingler; Artur Knautz; Heinz Körvers; Karl Kreutzberg; Wilhelm Müller; Günther Ortmann; Edgar Reinhardt; Fritz Spengler; Rudolf Stahl; Hans Theilig	Austria Franz Bartl; Franz Berghammer; Franz Bistricky; Franz Brunner; Johann Houschka; Emil Juracka; Ferdinand Kiefler; Josef Krejci; Otto Licha; Friedrich Maurer; Anton Perwein; Siegfried Powolny; Siegfried Purner; Walter Reisp; Alfred Schmalzer; Alois Schnabel; Ludwig Schuberth; Johann Tauscher; Jaroslav Volak; Leopold Wohlrab; Friedrich Wurmböck; Johann Zehetner	Switzerland Max Bloesch; Rolf Fäs; Burkhard Gantenbein; Willy Gysi; Erland Herkenrath; Ernst Hufschmid; Willy Hufschmid; Werner Meyer; Georg Mischon; Willy Schäfer; Werner Scheurmann; Edy Schmid; Erich Schmitt; Eugen Seiterle; Max Streib; Robert Studer; Rudolf Wirz

== Results ==
=== Preliminary round ===
==== Group A ====
Team	P	W	T	L	GF	GA	GD	Pts.
Germany	2	2	0	0	51	1	+50	4
Hungary	2	1	0	1	7	24	−17	2
United States	2	0	0	2	3	36	−33	0

Germany	22 – 0	Hungary
Hungary	7 – 2	United States
Germany	29 – 1	United States

==== Group B ====
Team	P	W	T	L	GF	GA	GD	Pts.
Austria	2	2	0	0	32	6	+26	4
Switzerland	2	1	0	1	11	20	−9	2
Romania	2	0	0	2	9	26	−17	0

Austria	18 – 3	Romania
Switzerland	8 – 6	Romania
Austria	14 – 3	Switzerland

=== Classification 5/6 ===
Romania	10 – 3	United States

=== Final round ===
Team	P	W	T	L	GF	GA	GD	Pts.
Germany	3	3	0	0	45	18	+27	6
Austria	3	2	0	1	28	23	+5	4
Switzerland	3	1	0	2	22	32	−10	2
Hungary	3	0	0	3	18	40	−22	0

Germany	19 – 6	Hungary
Austria	11 – 6	Switzerland
Austria	11 – 7	Hungary
Germany	16 – 6	Switzerland
Switzerland	10 – 5	Hungary
Germany	10 – 6	Austria	Attendance: 100,000

== Summary ==
Place	Nation
1	Germany
2	Austria
3	Switzerland
	Max Blösch; Rolf Fäs; Burkhard Gantenbein; Willy Gysi; Erland Herkenrath (Grasshopper-Club Zürich); Ernst Hufschmid; Willy Hufschmid; Werner Meyer (Abstinenten Basel); Georg Mischon; Willy Schäfer; Werner Scheurmann; Edy Schmid (Grasshopper-Club Zürich); Erich Schmitt; Eugen Seiterle; Max Streib; Robert Studer; Rudolf Wirz
4	Hungary Antal Benda (UTE); Sándor Cséfai (Elektromos MSE); Ferenc Cziráki (UTE); Miklós Fodor (Elektromos MSE); Lőrinc Galgóczi (UTE); János Koppány (Elektromos MSE); Lajos Kutasi (Elektromos MSE); Tibor Máté (VAC); Imre Páli (UTE); Ferenc Rákosi (Elektromos MSE); Endre Salgó (VAC); István Serényi (VAC); Sándor Szomori (UTE); Gyula Takács (MAFC); Antal Újváry (Elektromos MSE); Ferenc Velkey (Elektromos MSE)
5	Romania Coach: Hans Schuschnig (Hermannstädter Turnverein); Péter Facsi (Bukarest); Carol Haffer (Hermannstädter Turnverein); Ludovic Haffer (Hermannstädter Turnverein); Fritz Halmen (Hermannstädter Turnverein); Willi Heidel (Hermannstädter Turnverein); Hans Hermannstädter (Hermannstädter Turnverein); Hans Georg Herzog (Hermannstädter Turnverein); Alfred Höchsmann (Hermannstädter Turnverein); Bruno Holzträger (Mediasch); Willi Kirschner (Hermannstädter Turnverein); Günther Schorsten (Hermannstädter Turnverein); Robert Speck (Hermannstädter Turnverein); Wilhelm Zacharias (Hermannstädter Turnverein); Hans Zikeli (Mediasch); Stefan Zoller (Hermannstädter Turnverein) Dragan Comanescu (Viforul Dacia Bukarest); Fritz Kasemiresch (Mediasch); Stippi Orendi (Kronstadt); Oki Sonntag (Hermannstädter Turnverein)
6	United States William Alexander Ahlemeyer; Walter Bowden; Charles C. Dauner; Edward John Hagen; Joseph Kaylor; Fred Leinweber; Henry Oehler; Otto Oehler; Herbert Karl Oehmichen; Willy K. Renz; Alfred Rosesco; Edmund Schallenberg; Gerard A. Yantz Philip Schupp
