= Willy Renz =

American handball player

Personal information
- Full name: William K. Renz
- Nationality: Germany
- Born: May 24, 1913 Kircheim Unter Teck, Donaukreis, Wuerttemberg, Germany
- Died: May 3, 1981 (aged 67) Jenkintown, PA

Sport
- Sport: Handball

Senior clubs
- Years: Team
- ?-?: Cake Bakers Sport Club
National team
Years	Team	Apps
?-?	United States	3

Teams managed
- ?-?: United States (Player-coach)

William K. Renz (May 24, 1913 – May 3, 1981) was an American male handball player. He was a member of the United States men's national handball team. He was part of the team at the 1936 Summer Olympics, playing 3 matches, and was a playing-coach. On club level he played for Cake Bakers Sport Club in Philadelphia, Pennsylvania.
