= Germany at the 1936 Summer Olympics =

- IOC code: GER
- NOC: German Olympic Committee

in Berlin 1–16 August 1936
- Competitors: 433 (389 men and 44 women) in 22 sports
- Flag bearer: Hans Fritsch
- Medals Ranked 1st: Gold 33 Silver 26 Bronze 30 Total 89

Summer Olympics appearances (overview)
- 1896; 1900; 1904; 1908; 1912; 1920–1924; 1928; 1932; 1936; 1948; 1952; 1956–1988; 1992; 1996; 2000; 2004; 2008; 2012; 2016; 2020; 2024

Other related appearances
- 1906 Intercalated Games –––– Saar (1952); United Team of Germany (1956–1964); East Germany (1968–1988); West Germany (1968–1988)

Germany was the host nation and top medal recipient at the 1936 Summer Olympics in Berlin. 433 competitors, 389 men and 44 women, took part in 143 events in 22 sports.

The total of 33 gold and 89 total medals still stands as a record medal tally for unified Germany.

== Medalists ==
=== Gold ===
- Hans Woellke — Athletics, Men's Shot Put
- Karl Hein — Athletics, Men's Hammer Throw
- Gerhard Stöck — Athletics, Men's Javelin Throw
- Gisela Mauermayer — Athletics, Women's Discus Throw
- Tilly Fleischer — Athletics, Women's Javelin Throw
- Willi Kaiser — Boxing, Men's Flyweight
- Herbert Runge — Boxing, Men's Heavyweight
- Ernst Krebs — Canoeing, Men's K1 10,000 m Kayak Singles
- Ludwig Landen and Paul Wevers — Canoeing, Men's K2 10,000 m Kayak Pairs
- Toni Merkens — Cycling, Men's 1000 m Sprint (Scratch)
- Ernst Ihbe and Carl Lorenz — Cycling, Men's 2000 m Tandem
- Ludwig Stubbendorf — Equestrian, Three-Day Event Individual
- Rolf Lippert, Ludwig Stubbendorf, and Konrad Freiherr von Wangenheim — Equestrian, Three-Day Event Team
- Kurt Hasse — Equestrian, Jumping Individual
- Heinz Brandt, Kurt Hasse, and Marten von Barnekow — Equestrian, Jumping Team
- Heinz Pollay — Equestrian, Dressage Individual
- Friedrich Gerhard, Heinz Pollay, and Hermann von Oppeln-Bronikowski — Equestrian, Dressage Team
- Alfred Schwarzmann — Gymnastics, Men's All-Around Individual
- Konrad Frey — Gymnastics, Men's Parallel Bars
- Alfred Schwarzmann — Gymnastics, Men's Long Horse Vault
- Konrad Frey — Gymnastics, Men's Pommeled Horse
- Franz Beckert, Konrad Frey, Alfred Schwarzmann, Willi Stadel, Walter Steffens, and Matthias Volz — Gymnastics, Men's Team Combined Exercises
- Anita Bärwirth, Erna Bürger, Isolde Frölian, Friedl Iby, Trudi Meyer, Paula Pöhlsen, Julie Schmitt, and Käthe Sohnemann — Gymnastics, Women's Team Combined Exercises
- Willy Bandholz, Wilhelm Baumann, Helmut Berthold, Helmut Braselmann, Wilhelm Brinkmann, Georg Dascher, Kurt Dossin, Fritz Fromm, Hermann Hansen, Erich Herrmann, Heinrich Keimig, Hans Keiter, Alfred Klingler, Artur Knautz, Heinz Körvers, Karl Kreutzberg, Wilhelm Müller, Günther Ortmann, Edgar Reinhardt, Fritz Spengler, Rudolf Stahl, and Hans Theilig — Handball, Men's Team Competition
- Gotthard Handrick — Modern Pentathlon, Men's Individual Competition
- Gustav Schäfer — Rowing, Men's Single Sculls
- Willi Eichhorn and Hugo Strauß — Rowing, Men's Coxless Pairs
- Herbert Adamski, Dieter Arend and Gerhard Gustmann — Rowing, Men's Coxed Pairs
- Rudolf Eckstein, Martin Karl, Willi Menne, and Toni Rom — Rowing, Men's Coxless Fours
- Fritz Bauer, Ernst Gaber, Hans Maier, Paul Söllner, and Walter Volle — Rowing, Men's Coxed Fours
- Peter Bischoff and Hans-Joachim Weise — Sailing, Men's Star
- Cornelius van Oyen — Shooting, Men's Rapid-Fire Pistol
- Josef Manger — Weightlifting, Men's Heavyweight

=== Silver ===
- Lutz Long — Athletics, Men's Long Jump
- Erwin Blask — Athletics, Men's Hammer Throw
- Anni Steuer — Athletics, Women's 80 m Hurdles
- Luise Krüger — Athletics, Women's Javelin Throw
- Michael Murach — Boxing, Men's Welterweight
- Richard Vogt — Boxing, Men's Light Heavyweight
- Helmut Cämmerer — Canoeing, Men's K1 1000 m Kayak Singles
- Fritz Bondroit and Ewald Tilker — Canoeing, Men's K2 1000 m Kayak Pairs
- Erich Hanisch and Willi Horn — Canoeing, Men's F2 10,000 m Folding Kayak Pairs
- Friedrich Gerhard — Equestrian, Dressage Individual
- Helene Mayer — Fencing, Women's Foil Individual
- Konrad Frey — Gymnastics, Men's Horizontal Bar
- Hermann auf der Heide, Ludwig Beisiegel, Erich Cuntz, Karl Dröse, Alfred Gerdes, Werner Hamel, Harald Huffmann, Erwin Keller, Herbert Kemmer, Werner Kubitzki, Paul Mehlitz, Carl Menke, Fritz Messner, Detlef Okrent, Heinrich Peter, Heinz Raack, Carl Ruck, Hans Scherbart, Heinz Schmalix, Tito Warnholtz, Kurt Weiß, and Erich Zander — Field Hockey, Men's Team Competition
- Willi Kaidel and Joachim Pirsch — Rowing, Men's Double Sculls
- Werner Krogmann — Sailing, Men's Monotype Class
- Heinz Hax — Shooting, Men's Rapid-Fire Pistol
- Erich Krempel — Shooting, Men's Free Pistol
- Erwin Sietas — Swimming, Men's 200 m Breaststroke
- Martha Genenger — Swimming, Women's 200 m Breaststroke
- Gisela Arendt, Ruth Halbsguth, Leni Lohmar, and Inge Schmitz — Swimming, Women's 4 × 100 m Freestyle Relay
- Paul Klingenburg, Bernhard Baier, Fritz Gunst, Gustav Schürger, Josef Hauser, Alfred Kienzle, Hans Schulze, Helmuth Schwenn, Hans Schneider, Heinrich Krug and Fritz Stolze — Water Polo, Men's Team Competition
- Rudolf Ismayr — Weightlifting, Men's Middleweight
- Eugen Deutsch — Weightlifting, Men's Light Heavyweight
- Fritz Schäfer — Wrestling, Men's Greco-Roman Welterweight
- Ludwig Schweickert — Wrestling, Men's Greco-Roman Middleweight
- Wolfgang Ehrl — Wrestling, Men's Freestyle Lightweight

=== Bronze ===
- Alfred Dompert — Athletics, Men's 3000 m Steeplechase
- Erich Borchmeyer, Erwin Gillmeister, Gerd Hornberger, and Wilhelm Leichum — Athletics, Men's 4 × 100 m Relay
- Helmut Hamann, Rudolf Harbig, Harry Voigt, and Friedrich von Stülpnagel — Athletics, Men's 4 × 400 m Relay
- Gerhard Stöck — Athletics, Men's Shot Put
- Käthe Krauß — Athletics, Women's 100 metres
- Elfriede Kaun — Athletics, Women's High Jump
- Paula Mollenhauer — Athletics, Women's Discus Throw
- Josef Miner — Boxing, Men's Featherweight
- Xaver Hörmann — Canoeing, Men's F1 10,000 m Folding Kayak Singles
- Erich Koschik — Canoeing, Men's C1 1000 m Canadian Singles
- Rudolf Karsch — Cycling, Men's 1000 m Time Trial
- Hermann Stork — Diving, Men's Platform
- Käthe Köhler — Diving, Women's Platform
- Otto Adam, Erwin Casmir, Julius Eisenecker, August Heim, Siegried Lerdon, and Stefan Rosenbauer — Fencing, Men's Foil Team Competition
- Erwin Casmir, Julius Eisenecker, Hans Esser, August Heim, Hans Jörger, and Richard Wahl — Fencing, Men's Sabre Team Competition
- Konrad Frey — Gymnastics, Men's All-Around Individual
- Alfred Schwarzmann — Gymnastics, Men's Horizontal Bar
- Alfred Schwarzmann — Gymnastics, Men's Parallel Bars
- Matthias Volz — Gymnastics, Men's Long Horse Vault
- Matthias Volz — Gymnastics, Men's Rings
- Konrad Frey — Gymnastics, Men's Floor Exercises
- Hans-Joachim Hannemann, Heinz Kaufmann, Hans Kuschke, Werner Loeckle, Wilhelm Mahlow, Helmut Radach, Alfred Rieck, Herbert Schmidt, and Gerd Völs — Rowing, Men's Eights
- Fritz Bischoff, Hans Howaldt, Alfried Krupp von Bohlen und Halbach, Eduard Mohr, Felix Scheder-Bieschin, and Otto Wachs — Sailing, 8 Meter Class
- Gisela Arendt — Swimming, Women's 100 m Freestyle
- Karl Jansen — Weightlifting, Men's Lightweight
- Adolf Wagner — Weightlifting, Men's Middleweight
- Jakob Brendel — Wrestling, Men's Greco-Roman Bantamweight
- Kurt Hornfischer — Wrestling, Men's Greco-Roman Heavyweight
- Johannes Herbert — Wrestling, Men's Freestyle Bantamweight
- Erich Siebert — Wrestling, Men's Freestyle Light Heavyweight

== Basketball ==
=== First round ===
Winners advanced to the second round, while losers competed in the first consolation round for another chance to move on.

7 August 1936	Switzerland	25–18	Germany	Berlin, Germany
	Scoring by half: 8–10, 17–8

=== Second round ===
Winners advanced to the third round, while losers competed in the second consolation round for another chance to move on.

9 August 1936	Italy	58–16	Germany	Berlin, Germany

=== Second consolation round ===
Winners advanced to the third round.

10 August 1936	Czechoslovakia	20–9	Germany	Berlin, Germany

== Cycling ==
Twelve cyclists, all men, represented Germany in 1936.

Individual road race

- Fritz Scheller
- Willi Meurer
- Fritz Ruland
- Emil Schöpflin

Team road race

- Fritz Scheller
- Willi Meurer
- Fritz Ruland
- Emil Schöpflin

Sprint

- Toni Merkens

Time trial

- Rudolf Karsch

Tandem

- Ernst Ihbe
- Carl Lorenz

Team pursuit

- Erich Arndt
- Heinz Hasselberg
- Heiner Hoffmann
- Karl Klöckner

== Diving ==
Men

Athlete	Event	Final	
Athlete	Event	Points	Rank
Leo Esser	3 m springboard	137.99	6
Winfried Mahraun	3 m springboard	134.61	7
Erhard Weiß	3 m springboard	141.21	5
Hermann Stork	10 m platform	110.31	3rd place, bronze medalist(s)
Siegfried Viebahn	10 m platform	105.00	7
Erhard Weiß	10 m platform	110.15	4

Women

Athlete	Event	Final	
Athlete	Event	Points	Rank
Gerda Daumerlang	3 m springboard	78.27	4
Suse Heinze	3 m springboard	71.49	7
Olga Jensch-Jordan	3 m springboard	77.98	5
Anne Ehscheidt	10 m platform	29.90	8
Anneliese Kapp	10 m platform	28.66	11
Käthe Köhler	10 m platform	33.43	3rd place, bronze medalist(s)

== Fencing ==
16 fencers, 13 men and 3 women, represented Germany in 1936.

Men's foil

- Erwin Casmir
- Julius Eisenecker
- August Heim

Men's team foil

- Siegfried Lerdon, August Heim, Julius Eisenecker, Erwin Casmir, Stefan Rosenbauer, Otto Adam

Men's épée

- Siegfried Lerdon
- Ernst Röthig
- Otto Schröder

Men's team épée

- Siegfried Lerdon, Sepp Uhlmann, Hans Esser, Eugen Geiwitz, Ernst Röthig, Otto Schröder

Men's sabre

- Richard Wahl
- August Heim

Men's team sabre

- Richard Wahl, Julius Eisenecker, Erwin Casmir, August Heim, Hans Esser, Hans-Georg Jörger

Women's foil

- Helene Mayer
- Hedwig Haß
- Olga Oelkers

== Field hockey ==
=== Group B ===
Pos	Team	Pld	W	D	L	GF	GA	GD	Pts	Qualification
1	Germany (H)	2	2	0	0	10	1	+9	4	Semi-finals
2	Afghanistan	2	0	1	1	7	10	−3	1	
3	Denmark	2	0	1	1	6	12	−6	1	

Source: TheSports.org
(H) Hosts

6 August 1936
18:00

Germany	6–0	Denmark
	Report

8 August 1936
16:30

Germany	4–1	Afghanistan
	Report

=== Semi-finals ===
12 August 1936
18:00

Germany	3–0	Netherlands

=== Gold medal match ===
15 August 1936
11:00

India	8–1	Germany
Chand 32', 44', 45', 70'; Tapsell 43'; Jaffar 56'; Dara 62', ?'	Report	Weiß 51'

== Football ==
=== First round ===
4 August 1936

Germany	9–0	Luxembourg
Urban 16', 54', 75'; Simetsreiter 32', 48', 74'; Gauchel 49', 89'; Elbern 76'	Report

Berlin Poststadion
Attendance: 12.000
Referee: Pál von Hertzka (HUN)

=== Quarter-finals ===
7 August 1936

Germany	0–2	Norway
	Report	Isaksen 7', 83'

Berlin Poststadion
Attendance: 55.000
Referee: Arthur Willoughby Barton (GBR)

== Handball ==
=== Preliminary round ===
==== Group A ====
Team	P	W	T	L	GF	GA	GD	Pts.
Germany	2	2	0	0	51	1	+50	4
Hungary	2	1	0	1	7	24	−17	2
United States	2	0	0	2	3	36	−33	0

Germany	22 – 0	Hungary
Hungary	7 – 2	United States
Germany	29 – 1	United States

=== Final round ===
Team	P	W	T	L	GF	GA	GD	Pts.
Germany	3	3	0	0	45	18	+27	6
Austria	3	2	0	1	28	23	+5	4
Switzerland	3	1	0	2	22	32	−10	2
Hungary	3	0	0	3	18	40	−22	0

Germany	19 – 6	Hungary
Austria	11 – 6	Switzerland
Austria	11 – 7	Hungary
Germany	16 – 6	Switzerland
Switzerland	10 – 5	Hungary
Germany	10 – 6	Austria	Attendance: 100,000

== Modern pentathlon ==
Three male pentathletes represented Germany in 1936, with Gotthard Handrick winning gold.

- Gotthard Handrick
- Hermann Lemp
- Herbert Bramfeldt

== Polo ==
Group B

4 August

Hungary	8–8	Germany

6 August

Hungary	16–6	Germany

== Rowing ==
Germany had 26 rowers participate in seven out of seven rowing events in 1936.

Men's single sculls

- Gustav Schäfer

Men's double sculls

- Willi Kaidel
- Joachim Pirsch

Men's coxless pair

- Willi Eichhorn
- Hugo Strauß

Men's coxed pair

- Gerhard Gustmann
- Herbert Adamski
- Dieter Arend (cox)

Men's coxless four

- Rudolf Eckstein
- Anton Rom
- Martin Karl
- Wilhelm Menne

Men's coxed four

- Hans Maier
- Walter Volle
- Ernst Gaber
- Paul Söllner
- Fritz Bauer (cox)

Men's eight

- Alfred Rieck
- Helmut Radach
- Hans Kuschke
- Heinz Kaufmann
- Gerd Völs
- Werner Loeckle
- Hans-Joachim Hannemann
- Herbert Schmidt
- Wilhelm Mahlow (cox)

== Shooting ==
Nine shooters represented Germany in 1936. In the 25 m pistol event, Cornelius van Oyen won gold and Heinrich Hax won silver.

25 m rapid fire pistol

- Cornelius van Oyen
- Heinrich Hax
- Georg Dern

50 m pistol

- Erich Krempel
- Paul Wehner
- Emil Martin

50 m rifle, prone

- Johann Schulz
- Erich Hotopf
- Arran Hoffmann

== Swimming ==
Men

Ranks given are within the heat.

Athlete	Event	Heat		Semifinal		Final	
Athlete	Event	Time	Rank	Time	Rank	Time	Rank
Helmuth Fischer	100 m freestyle	57.9	2 Q	58.7	4 Q	59.3	5
Hermann Heibel	100 m freestyle	1:01.4	2 Q	1:00.3	6	Did not advance	
Heiko Schwartz	100 m freestyle	1:01.8	3	Did not advance			
Heinz Arendt	400 m freestyle	4:57.2	3 q	5:13.4	5	Did not advance	
Hans Freese	400 m freestyle	5:03.1	2 Q	4:58.5	5	Did not advance	
Otto Przywara	400 m freestyle	5:11.7	2 Q	5:14.9	6	Did not advance	
Heinz Arendt	1500 m freestyle	20:10.7	3 Q	19:56.1	4 q	19:59.0	7
Hans Freese	1500 m freestyle	20:13.7	3 Q	20:27.6	5	Did not advance	
Otto Przywara	1500 m freestyle	20:59.0	3 Q	20:55.0	6	Did not advance	
Heinz Schlauch	100 m backstroke	1:10.1	2 Q	1:10.8	4	Did not advance	
Hans Schwarz	100 m backstroke	1:11.0	3 Q	1:11.8	7	Did not advance	
Erwin Simon	100 m backstroke	1:11.7	4 q	1:11.7	6	Did not advance	
Jochen Balke	200 m breaststroke	2:46.4	2 Q	2:45.4	2 Q	2:47.8	6
Arthur Heina	200 m breaststroke	2:48.5	3 Q	2:47.3	5	Did not advance	
Erwin Sietas	200 m breaststroke	2:44.6	2 Q	2:44.8	3 Q	2:42.9	2nd place, silver medalist(s)
Werner Plath; Hermann Heibel; Wolfgang Heimlich; Helmuth Fischer	4 × 200 m freestyle relay	—N/a		9:21.4	2 Q	9:19.0	5

Women

Ranks given are within the heat.

Athlete	Event	Heat		Semifinal		Final	
Athlete	Event	Time	Rank	Time	Rank	Time	Rank
Gisela Arendt	100 m freestyle	1:07.3	2 Q	1:07.2	2 Q	1:06.6	3rd place, bronze medalist(s)
Leni Lohmar	100 m freestyle	1:10.3	4	Did not advance			
Inge Schmitz	100 m freestyle	1:10.9	5	Did not advance			
Christel Rupke	100 m backstroke	1:23.7	5	Did not advance			
Anni Stolte	100 m backstroke	1:23.1	4 Q	1:21.7	5	Did not advance	
Martha Genenger	200 m breaststroke	3:02.9 OR	1 Q	3:02.8	1 Q	3:04.2	2nd place, silver medalist(s)
Hanni Hölzner	200 m breaststroke	3:11.0	4 Q	3:08.8	3 Q	3:09.5	=4
Trude Wollschläger	200 m breaststroke	3:08.5	1 Q	3:10.3	5	Did not advance	
Ruth Halbsguth; Leni Lohmar; Inge Schmitz; Gisela Arendt; Ursula Pollack*	4 × 100 m freestyle relay	—N/a		4:40.5	2 Q	4:36.8	2nd place, silver medalist(s)

*Swimmer who participated in the semifinals only and did not receive a medal.
