= Willi Heidel =

Romanian handball player (1916-2008)

Wilhelm "Willi" Heidel (28 February 1916 – 20 September 2008) was a Romanian field handball player of German ethnicity who competed in the 1936 Summer Olympics.

A Transylvanian Saxon born in Hermannstadt (Sibiu), at the time part of Austria-Hungary. He died in Lohhof, Germany.

Heidel was part of the Romanian field handball team, which finished fifth in the Olympic tournament. He played all three matches.
