= Hans Hermannstädter =

Romanian handball player (1918-2006)

Hans Hermannstädter (6 February 1918 – 30 December 2006) was a Romanian field handball player who competed in the 1936 Summer Olympics.

A Transylvanian Saxon, Hermannstädter was born in Neustadt near Kronstadt, Burzenland. He was part of the Romanian field handball team, which finished fifth in the Olympic tournament. He played one match. He died in Augsburg, Germany.
