= Ferenc Rákosi =

Hungarian handball player (1910–1987)

Ferenc Rákosi (German: Ferenc Rikker; 25 November 1910 in Pancsova – 10 July 1987 in Budapest) was a Hungarian field handball player who competed in the 1936 Summer Olympics. He was part of the Hungarian field handball team, which finished fourth in the Olympic tournament. He played four matches.
