= Günther Schorsten =

Romanian handball player (1916-1974)

Günther Schorsten (April 12, 1916 – May 20, 1974) was a Romanian field handball player of German origin who competed in the 1936 Summer Olympics. He was part of the Romanian field handball team, which finished fifth in the Olympic tournament. He played two matches.
