= Imre Páli =

Hungarian handball player (born 1909)

Imre Páli (German: Imre Paul; born 6 November 1909, date of death unknown) was a Hungarian field handball player who competed in the 1936 Summer Olympics. He was part of the Hungarian field handball team, which finished fourth in the Olympic tournament. He played two matches.
