= Miklós Fodor =

Hungarian handball player (1908–1997)

Miklós Fodor (3 September 1908 – 23 April 1997) was a Hungarian field handball player who competed in the 1936 Summer Olympics. He was part of the Hungarian field handball team, which finished fourth in the Olympic tournament. He played four matches.
