= Hans Zikeli =

Romanian handball player 1910–1999

Hans Zikeli (10 October 1910 – 6 February 1999) was a Romanian field handball player of German origin who competed in the 1936 Summer Olympics. He was born in Mediaș.

He was part of the Romanian field handball team, which finished fifth in the Olympic tournament. He played two matches.

Zikeli died in Gießhübl, Austria on 6 February 1999, aged 88.
