= Ferenc Cziráki =

Hungarian handball player (1913–1986)

Ferenc Cziráki (19 November 1913 in Budapest – 5 August 1986 in Budapest) was a Hungarian field handball player who competed in the 1936 Summer Olympics. He was part of the Hungarian field handball team, which finished fourth in the Olympic tournament. He played four matches.
