= Ștefan Zoller =

Romanian handball player (1914– 1993)

Personal information
- Citizenship: Romanian
- Born: 27 August 1914
- Died: 27 August 1914 – 21 October 1993
- Occupation: Romanian field handball

Ştefan Zoller (27 August 1914 – 21 October 1993) was a Romanian field handball player of German ethnicity who competed in the 1936 Summer Olympics. He was part of the Romanian field handball team, which finished fifth in the Olympic tournament. He played two matches as goalkeeper.

He was born in Sibiu in 1914, where he died in 1993 aged 79.
