= Lajos Kutasi =

Hungarian handball player (born 1915)

Lajos Kutasi (October 12, 1915 – before 1949) was a Hungarian field handball player who competed in the 1936 Summer Olympics. He was part of the Hungarian field handball team, which finished fourth in the Olympic tournament. He played three matches.
