= Antal Újváry =

Hungarian handball player (1907–1967)

Antal Újváry (March 16, 1907 – April 27, 1956) was a Hungarian field handball player who competed in the 1936 Summer Olympics. He was part of the Hungarian field handball team, which finished fourth in the Olympic tournament. He played three matches as goalkeeper.
