= Helmut Berthold =

German handball player (1911–2000)

Medal record

Men's field handball

Representing Germany

Olympic Games
Gold medal – first place	1936 Berlin	Team competition

Helmut Berthold (19 April 1911 – 20 September 2000) was a German field handball player who competed in the 1936 Summer Olympics. He was part of the German field handball team, which won the gold medal. He played two matches.
