= Edmund Schallenberg =

American handball player

Personal information
- Full name: Johann Edmund Schallenberg
- Nationality: United States
- Born: October 11, 1913 New York, United States
- Died: March 28, 1999 (aged 85) Blacksburg, Virginia, United States

Sport
- Sport: Handball

Senior clubs
- Years: Team
- ?-?: German Sport Club Brooklyn
National team
Years	Team	Apps
?-?	United States	3
- Updated on only during the 1936 Summer Olympics

Johann Edmund Schallenberg (October 11, 1913 – March 28, 1999) was an American male handball player. He was a member of the United States men's national handball team. He was part of the team at the 1936 Summer Olympics, playing 3 matches. On club level he played for German Sport Club Brooklyn in the United States.
