= Johann Houschka =

Austrian handball player (1914-1983)

Olympic medal record

Men's handball
Silver medal – second place	1936 Berlin	Team competition

Johann "Hans" Houschka (October 21, 1914 – May 27, 1983) was an Austrian field handball player who competed in the 1936 Summer Olympics.

He was part of the Austria field handball team, which won the Olympic silver medal. A midfielder, Hans played two matches during the tournament.
