= William Ahlemeyer =

American handball player

Personal information
- Full name: William Alexander Ahlemeyer
- Nationality: United States
- Born: July 20, 1907 Bremen, German Empire
- Died: May 21, 1952 (aged 44) Bremen, West Germany

Sport
- Sport: Handball

Senior clubs
- Years: Team
- –: German-American AC Queens
National team
Years	Team	Apps
–	United States	3
- Updated on only during the 1936 Summer Olympics

William Alexander Ahlemeyer (July 20, 1907 – May 21, 1952) was a German-born American handball player. He was a member of the United States men's national handball team. He was a part of the team at the 1936 Summer Olympics, playing 3 matches. On a club level he played for German-American AC Queens in the United States.
