= Erich Herrmann =

German handball player (1914-1989)

Medal record

Men's field handball

Representing Germany

Olympic Games
Gold medal – first place	1936 Berlin	Team competition

Erich Karl Albert Otto Herrmann (31 May 1914 – 13 April 1989) was a German field handball player who competed in the 1936 Summer Olympics. He was born in Berlin and died in Hamburg.

He was part of the German field handball team, which won the gold medal. He played three matches. He played in most national team games until the war on his position on the left outer side. After the war he lived in Hamburg staying active in Handball for many years with the clubs HTB 1862 and Viktoria Hamburg. Throughout he was coach and player at the same time. As trainer he led the Women's Team of TuS Alstertal to the German field handball championship in 1951 and 1952.
