= Fred Leinweber =

American Olympic handball player (born 1915)

Personal information
- Full name: Frederick Adam Leinweber
- Born: March 17, 1915 New York City, New York, U.S.

Sport
- Sport: Handball

Senior clubs
- Years: Team
- ?–?: German Sport Club Brooklyn
National team
Years	Team	Apps
?–?	United States	3

Frederick Adam Leinweber (born March 17, 1915, date of death unknown) was an American handball player. He was a member of the United States men's national handball team. He was part of the team at the 1936 Summer Olympics, playing 3 matches. At club level he played for the German Sport Club Brooklyn in the United States.
