= Fritz Fromm =

German handball player (1913-2001)

Medal record

Men's field handball

Representing Germany

Olympic Games
Gold medal – first place	1936 Berlin	Team competition

Fritz Fromm (12 April 1913 – 13 October 2001) was a German handball player and handball coach. He competed in field handball at the 1936 Summer Olympics. He was part of the German field handball team, which won a gold medal. He played two matches.

Between 1952 and 1953 he was the coach of the West Germany women's national team. He was the first post-war coach of the German national team.
