= Willy Bandholz =

German handball player (1912-1999)

Medal record

Men's field handball

Representing Germany

Olympic Games
Gold medal – first place	1936 Berlin	Team competition

Willy Bandholz (28 July 1912 – 29 January 1999) was a German field handball player who competed in the 1936 Summer Olympics.

He was part of the German field handball team, which won the gold medal. He played all five matches.
