= Wilhelm Müller (handballer) =

German handball player (1909-1984)

Medal record

Men's field handball

Representing Germany

Olympic Games
Gold medal – first place	1936 Berlin	Team competition

Wilhelm Müller (5 December 1909 – 22 February 1984) was a German field handball player who competed in the 1936 Summer Olympics.

He was part of the German field handball team, which won the gold medal. He played two matches.
