= Otto Oehler =

American handball player (1913–1941)

Personal information
- Nationality: United States
- Born: October 25, 1913 New York, United States
- Died: March 3, 1941 (aged 27) New York, United States

Sport
- Sport: Handball

Senior clubs
- Years: Team
- ?-?: German Sport Club Brooklyn
National team
Years	Team	Apps	(Gls)
?-?	United States	1	(0)

Otto Oehler (October 25, 1913 – March 3, 1941) was an American male handball player. He was a member of the United States men's national handball team. He was part of the team at the 1936 Summer Olympics, playing 1 match. On club level he played for German Sport Club Brooklyn in the United States.

His brother was handballer Henry Oehler who also competed for the national team at the 1936 Summer Olympics.
