= Willi Kirschner =

Romanian handball player (1911-1994)

Personal information
- Full name: Wilhelm Kirschner
- Nationality: Romania
- Born: 9 December 1911 Sibiu
- Died: 26 March 1994 (aged 82) Drabenderhöhe, Germany

Sport
- Sport: Handball

Senior clubs
- Years: Team
- ?-?: Hermannstädter Turnverein
National team
Years	Team	Apps	(Gls)
?-?	Romania	3	(2)
- Updated on only during the 1936 Summer Olympics

Wilhelm Kirschner, nicknamed Kiri, (9 December 1911 – 26 March 1994) was a Romanian male handball player. He was a member of the Romania men's national handball team. He was a part of the team at the 1936 Summer Olympics, playing 3 matches and scoring two goals. On club level he played for Hermannstädter Turnverein in Romania.
