= Kurt Dossin =

German handball player (1913-2004)

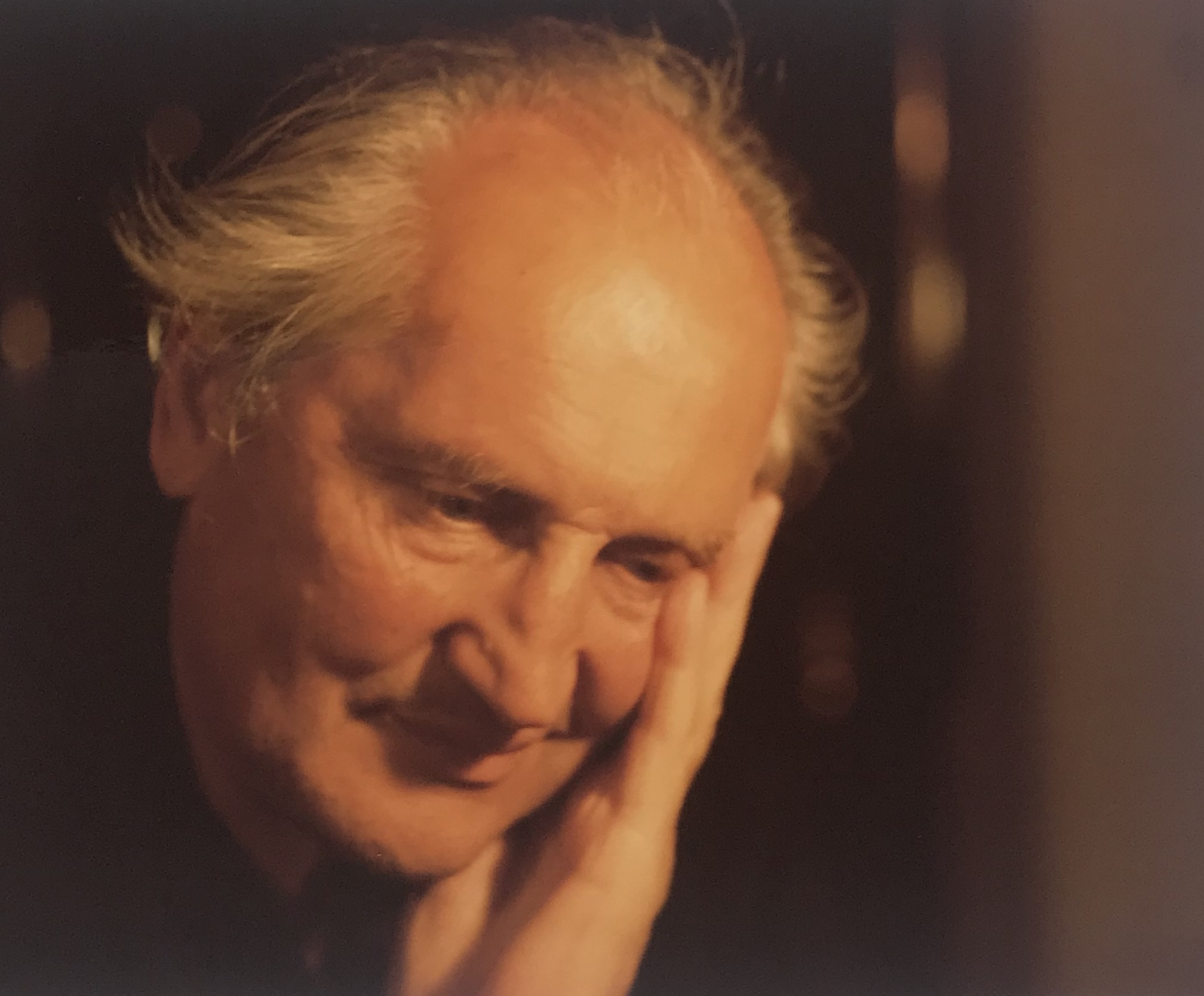

Medal record

Men's field handball

Representing Germany

Olympic Games
Gold medal – first place	1936 Berlin	Team competition

Kurt Dossin (28 March 1913 – 26 April 2004) was a German field handball player who competed in the 1936 Summer Olympics. He played two matches for the German team, which won the gold medal.
