= Herbert Bramfeldt =

German modern pentathlete

Personal information
- Born: 2 December 1912 Hamburg, German Empire
- Died: 20 May 1983 (aged 70) Hamburg, West Germany

Sport
- Sport: Modern pentathlon

Herbert Bramfeldt (2 December 1912 – 20 May 1983) was a German modern pentathlete. He competed at the 1936 Summer Olympics.
