= Josef Krejci =

Austrian handball player (born 1911)

Olympic medal record

Men's handball
Silver medal – second place	1936 Berlin	Team competition

Josef Krejci (2 March 1911 – 13 April 1997) was an Austrian field handball player who competed in the 1936 Summer Olympics. He was part of the Austria field handball team, which won the silver medal in the tournament, where he played two matches.
