= Alfred Rosesco =

American handball player

Personal information
- Nationality: United States
- Born: January 1, 1914 New York, United States
- Died: February 27, 1985 (aged 71) Dover, New Hampshire, United States

Sport
- Sport: Handball

Senior clubs
- Years: Team
- ?-?: German Sport Club Brooklyn
National team
Years	Team	Apps	(Gls)
?-?	United States	3	(0)

Alfred Rosesco (January 1, 1914 – February 27, 1985) was an American male handball player. He was a member of the United States men's national handball team. He was part of the team at the 1936 Summer Olympics, playing 3 matches. On club level he played for German Sport Club Brooklyn in the United States.
