= Otto Licha =

Austrian handball player (1912-1996)

Olympic medal record

Men's handball
Silver medal – second place	1936 Berlin	Team competition

Otto Licha (November 2, 1912 – April 9, 1996) was an Austrian field handball player who competed in the 1936 Summer Olympics.

He was part of the Austria field handball team, which won the silver medal in the tournament, where he played three matches including the final.

A midfielder, Licha domestically played for HC Alt-Turm Wien (Vienna).
