= Alfred Höchsmann =

Romanian handball player (1909-1978)

Personal information
- Nationality: Romania
- Born: 1 July 1909 Sibiu, Kingdom of Romania
- Died: 1978 Klagenfurt, Austria

Sport
- Sport: Handball

Senior clubs
- Years: Team
- ?-?: Hermannstädter Turnverein
National team
Years	Team	Apps
?-?	Romania	3
- Updated on only during the 1936 Summer Olympics

Alfred Gustav Höchsmann (1 July 1909 – 1978) was a Romanian handball player. He was a member of the Romania men's national handball team. He was a part of the team at the 1936 Summer Olympics, playing three matches. On club level he played for Hermannstädter Turnverein in Romania.

Höchsmann was born in Sibiu to ethnic German parents, Adolf Johann Höchsmann and Johanna Höchsmann.
