= Ludwig Schuberth =

Austrian handball player (1911-1989)

Olympic medal record

Men's handball
| Silver medal – second place | 1936 Berlin | Team competition |

Ludwig Schuberth (24 July 1911 – 30 September 1989) was an Austrian field handball player who competed in the 1936 Summer Olympics.

He was part of the Austrian field handball team, which won the silver medal. He played two matches.
