= Leopold Wohlrab =

Austrian handball player (1912-1981)

Olympic medal record

Men's handball
Silver medal – second place	1936 Berlin	Team competition

Leopold Wohlrab (March 22, 1912 – January 5, 1981) was an Austrian field handball player who competed in the 1936 Summer Olympics.

He was part of the Austrian field handball team, which won the silver medal. He played three matches.
