= Joe Kaylor =

American handball player (1916–1999)

Personal information
- Full name: Joseph Daniel Kaylor
- Nationality: United States
- Born: July 6, 1916 New York, United States
- Died: February 20, 1999 (aged 82) New York, United States
- Height: 178 cm (70 in)

Sport
- Sport: Handball

Senior clubs
- Years: Team
- ?-?: Deutscher Sport Club NY
National team
Years	Team	Apps	(Gls)
?-?	United States	3	(1)

Joseph Daniel Kaylor (July 6, 1916 – February 20, 1999) was an American male handball player. He was a member of the United States men's national handball team. He was part of the team at the 1936 Summer Olympics, playing three matches. On club level he played for Deutscher Sport Club NY in New York, the United States. Kaylor also boxed in the 1930s and got the nickname "K.O.".

== Personal ==
Kaylor had nine brothers and sisters. In 1947 he married Mary McWilliams and had 4 children.
