= Franz Bistricky =

Austrian handball player (1914–1975)

Olympic medal record

Men's handball
Silver medal – second place	1936 Berlin	Team competition

Franz Bistricky (26 July 1914 – 7 May 1975) was an Austrian field handball player who competed in the 1936 Summer Olympics.

He was part of the Austria field handball team, which won the silver medal in handball at the 1936 Summer Olympics. He played two matches during the tournament, scoring one goal.
