= Robert Speck (handballer) =

Romanian handball player (1909–1979)

Robert Speck (28 April 1909 – July 13, 1979) was a Romanian field handball player of German origin who competed in the 1936 Summer Olympics. He was part of the Romanian field handball team, which finished fifth in the Olympic tournament. He played all three matches.
