= Adolf Stocker =

Swiss fencer

Personal information
- Born: 26 February 1894
- Died: June 1979 (aged 85)

Sport
- Sport: Fencing

Adolf Stocker (26 February 1894 – June 1979) was a Swiss fencer. He competed in the individual and team sabre events at the 1936 Summer Olympics.
