= Henry Oehler =

American handball player (1916–1991)

Personal information
- Full name: Henry P. Oehler
- Nationality: United States
- Born: March 22, 1916 New York, United States
- Died: February 9, 1991 (aged 74) Tucson, United States

Sport
- Sport: Handball

Senior clubs
- Years: Team
- ?-?: German Sport Club Brooklyn
National team
Years	Team	Apps	(Gls)
?-?	United States	3	(0)

Henry P. Oehler (March 22, 1916 – February 9, 1991) was an American male handball player. He was a member of the United States men's national handball team. He was part of the team at the 1936 Summer Olympics, playing 3 matches. On club level he played for German Sport Club Brooklyn in the United States.

His brother was handballer Otto Oehler who also competed for the national team at the 1936 Summer Olympics.
