= Ernst Röthig =

German fencer

Personal information
- Born: 15 March 1906
- Died: 31 May 1969 (aged 63)

Sport
- Sport: Fencing

Ernst Röthig (15 March 1906 – 31 May 1969) was a German fencer. He competed in the individual and team épée events at the 1936 Summer Olympics.
