= Franz Brunner (handballer) =

Austrian handball player (1913–1991)

Olympic medal record

Men's handball
Silver medal – second place	1936 Berlin	Team competition

Franz Brunner (21 March 1913 – 22 December 1991) was an Austrian field handball player who competed in the 1936 Summer Olympics. He was part of the Austria field handball team that won the silver medal in handball at the Olympics. He played two matches during the tournament.
