= Alois Schnabel =

Austrian handball player (1910-1982)

Olympic medal record

Men's handball
| Silver medal – second place | 1936 Berlin | Team competition |

Alois Schnabel (27 February 1910 in Vienna – 20 September 1982) was an Austrian field handball player who competed in the 1936 Summer Olympics.

He was part of the Austrian field handball team, which won the silver medal. He played three matches including the final as goalkeeper.
