= Fritz Halmen =

Romanian handball player (1912-2002)

Personal information
- Full name: Friedrich Halmen
- Nationality: Romania
- Born: 2 April 1912 Bazna
- Died: 11 October 2002 (aged 90) Munich, Germany

Sport
- Sport: Handball

Senior clubs
- Years: Team
- ?-?: Hermannstädter Turnverein
National team
Years	Team	Apps
?-?	Romania	3
- Updated on only during the 1936 Summer Olympics

Friedrich "Fritz" Halmen, also written as Frederic Halmen, (2 April 1912 - 11 October 2002) was a Romanian male handball player. He was a member of the Romania men's national handball team. He was a part of the team at the 1936 Summer Olympics, playing 3 matches. On club level he played for Hermannstädter Turnverein in Romania.
