= Clayton Mansfield =

American modern pentathlete (1906–1945)

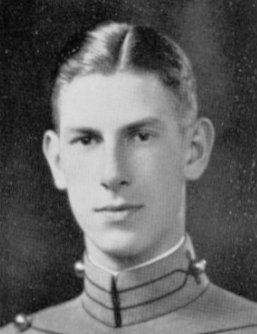
- At West Point in 1928

Personal information
- Born: May 21, 1906 Norristown, Pennsylvania, United States
- Died: January 9, 1945 (aged 38) Ardennes, German-occupied Belgium

Sport
- Sport: Modern pentathlon

Clayton Mansfield (May 21, 1906 – January 9, 1945) was an American modern pentathlete and a colonel in the United States Army. He competed at the 1932 Summer Olympics. He graduated from United States Military Academy in 1928 and became an officer in the United States Army. He served during World War II and was killed in German-occupied Belgium during the last days of the Battle of the Bulge. He received the Silver Star.
