= Hermann Hansen =

German handball player (1912-1944)

Medal record

Men's field handball

Representing Germany

Olympic Games
Gold medal – first place	1936 Berlin	Team competition

Hermann Hansen (31 October 1912 – 28 June 1944) was a German field handball player who competed in the 1936 Summer Olympics. He was part of the German field handball team, which won the gold medal. He played two matches including the final.
