= Walter Bowden =

American handball player

Personal information
- Nationality: United States
- Born: December 29, 1910 New York City, New York, U.S.
- Died: April 19, 2001 (aged 90) Lindenhurst, New York, U.S.

Sport
- Sport: Handball

Senior clubs
- Years: Team
- ?-?: German Sport Club Brooklyn
National team
Years	Team	Apps	(Gls)
?-?	United States	3	(?)
- Updated on only during the 1936 Summer Olympics

Walter Bowden (December 29, 1910 – April 19, 2001) was an American male handball player. He was a member of the United States men's national handball team. He was a part of the team at the 1936 Summer Olympics, playing 3 matches. On the club level he played for German Sport Club Brooklyn in New York City.
