= Hermann Lemp (pentathlete) =

Modern pentathlete

Personal information
- Born: 20 July 1914 Rosenheim, German Empire
- Died: 9 November 1943 (aged 29) Vitebsk, Belarus, Reichskommissariat Ostland

Sport
- Sport: Modern pentathlon

Hermann Lemp (20 July 1914 – 9 November 1943) was a German modern pentathlete. He competed at the 1936 Summer Olympics. He was killed in action during World War II.
