= Charles Glasstetter =

Swiss fencer

Personal information
- Born: 13 February 1897

Sport
- Sport: Fencing

Charles Glasstetter (born 13 February 1897, date of death unknown) was a Swiss fencer. He competed in the individual and team sabre events at the 1936 Summer Olympics.
