= Alfred Klingler =

German handball player (born 1912)

Medal record

Men's field handball

Representing Germany

Olympic Games
| Gold medal – first place | 1936 Berlin | Team competition |

Alfred Klingler (25 October 1912 in Leipzig, Germany – ?) was a German field handball player who competed in the 1936 Summer Olympics. Klingler was part of the German field handball team, which won the gold medal. He played three matches. He was also on the team, who won the 1936 World Cup in field handball. With his club Polizei-SV Magdeburg he won the German Championship in 1935.

After his playing career he became a handball coach.
