= Péter Fecsi =

Romanian handball player (born 1905)

Personal information
- Nationality: Romania
- Born: 21 July 1905

Sport
- Sport: Handball
- Position: goalkeeper

Senior clubs
- Years: Team
- ?-?: Viforul Dacia București
National team
Years	Team	Apps	(Gls)
?-?	Romania	1	(0)
- Updated on only during the 1936 Summer Olympics

Péter Fecsi (born 21 July 1905) was a Romanian handball player. He was a member of the Romania men's national handball team, playing as a goalkeeper. He was part of the team at the 1936 Summer Olympics. On club level he played for Viforul Dacia București in Romania.
