= Edgar Reinhardt =

German handball player (1914-1985)

Medal record

Men's field handball

Representing Germany

Olympic Games
Gold medal – first place	1936 Berlin	Team competition

Edgar Reinhardt (21 May 1914 – 11 January 1985) was a German field handball player who competed in the 1936 Summer Olympics as part of the German field handball team. The team won the gold medal. During the competition, Reinhardt played two matches including the final as goalkeeper.
