= Johann Tauscher =

Austrian handball player (1909–1979)

Olympic medal record

Men's handball
Silver medal – second place	1936 Berlin	Team competition

Johann Tauscher (31 March 1909 – 21 January 1979) was an Austrian field handball player who competed in the 1936 Summer Olympics.

He was part of the Austrian field handball team, which won the silver medal. He played three matches including the final.
