= Karl Haffer =

Romanian handball player (born 1912)

Personal information
- Nationality: Romania
- Born: 2 October 1912 Sibiu, Kingdom of Romania

Sport
- Sport: Handball

Senior clubs
- Years: Team
- ?-?: Hermannstädter Turnverein
National team
Years	Team	Apps
?-?	Romania	3
- Updated on Caps and goals only during the 1936 Summer Olympics

Karl Haffer also written as Carol Haffer (born 2 November 1912) was a member of the Romania men's national handball team, who took part in the 1936 Summer Olympics. On club level he played for Hermannstädter Turnverein in Romania.

Haffer was the brother of Fritz Haffer, also a handball player .
