= Franz Berghammer =

Austrian handball player (1913-1944)

Olympic medal record

Men's handball
Silver medal – second place	1936 Berlin	Team competition

Franz Berghammer (November 20, 1913 – July 7, 1944) was an Austrian field handball player who competed in the 1936 Summer Olympics. He was part of the Austria field handball team that won the silver medal in handball at the Olympics. He played two matches during the tournament, scoring five goals.

He was killed in action during World War II. He had gone missing between 24th and 30th June 1944 near Babruysk, in what is now Belorussia.
