= Werner Meyer (handballer) =

Swiss handball player

Olympic medal record

Men's handball
Bronze medal – third place	1936 Berlin	Team competition

Werner "Kress" Meyer (30 May 1914 – 10 September 1985) was a Swiss field handball player who competed in the 1936 Summer Olympics Berlin, Germany.

He was part of the Swiss field handball team, which won the bronze medal. He played in three matches of the Olympics.
