= Max Streib =

Swiss handball player (1912–1989)

Olympic medal record

Men's handball
Bronze medal – third place	1936 Berlin	Team competition

Max Streib (December 20, 1912 – November 1, 1989) was a Swiss field handball player who competed in the 1936 Summer Olympics.

He was part of the Swiss field handball team, which won the bronze medal. He played all five matches.
