= Georg Dascher =

German handball player (1911-1944)

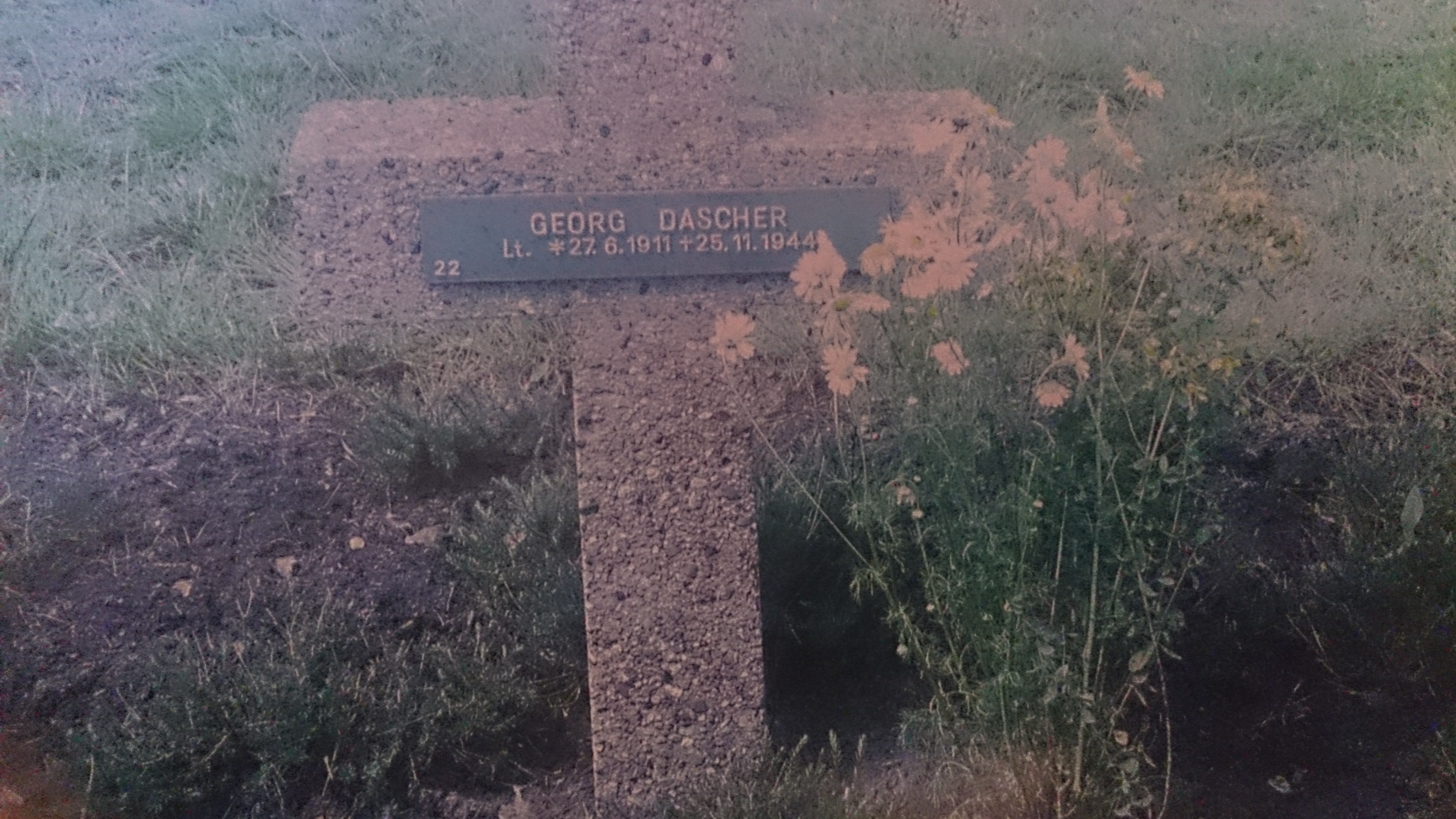
- Daschers grave in Lommel, Belgium

Medal record

Men's field handball

Representing Germany

Olympic Games
Gold medal – first place	1936 Berlin	Team competition

Georg Dascher (27 June 1911 – 25 November 1944) was a German field handball player who competed in the 1936 Summer Olympics. He was part of the German field handball team, which won the gold medal. He played two matches.

He served as a lieutenant in the Wehrmacht, and died on the Western Front. He is buried at the German War cemetery in Lommel, Belgium.
