= Werner Scheurmann =

Swiss handball player

Olympic medal record

Men's handball
Bronze medal – third place	1936 Berlin	Team competition

Werner Scheurmann (born 27 September 1909, date of death unknown) was a Swiss field handball player who competed in the 1936 Summer Olympics. He was part of the Swiss field handball team, which won the bronze medal. He played in one match.
