= Max Bloesch =

Swiss handball player (1908–1997)

Olympic medal record

Men's handball
| Bronze medal – third place | 1936 Berlin | Team competition |

Max Bloesch (also Blösch; 27 June 1908 – 9 August 1997) was a Swiss field handball player who competed in the 1936 Summer Olympics.

He was part of the Swiss field handball team, which won the bronze medal. He played one match.

Later in life, he was a conservationist who helped the population of storks in Switzerland rebound. For his work as "Father Stork" he was awarded an honorary doctorate from the University of Bern.
