= Edy Schmid =

Swiss handball player

Olympic medal record

Men's handball
Bronze medal – third place	1936 Berlin	Team competition

Eduard "Edy" Schmid (May 3, 1911 – September 25, 2000) was a Swiss field handball player who competed in the 1936 Summer Olympics.

He was part of the Swiss field handball team, which won the bronze medal. He played three matches as goalkeeper, winning once.
