= Burkhard Gantenbein =

Swiss handball player

Olympic medal record

Men's handball
Bronze medal – third place	1936 Berlin	Team competition

Burkhard Gantenbein (14 July 1912 – 27 August 2007) was a Swiss field handball player who competed in the 1936 Summer Olympics. He was part of the Swiss field handball team, which won the bronze medal. He played two matches.
