= Willy Gysi =

Swiss handball player (1918–2001)

Personal information
- Born: 9 January 1918 Basel, Switzerland
- Died: 12 May 2001 (aged 83) Bern, Switzerland
Medal record
Men's Handball
Olympic Games
Bronze medal – third place	1936 Berlin	Team competition

Willy Gysi (9 January 1918 – 12 May 2001) was a Swiss field handball player who competed in the 1936 Summer Olympics. He was part of the Swiss field handball team, which won the bronze medal. He played two matches as goalkeeper.
