= Emil Juracka =

Austrian handball player (1912–1944)

Olympic medal record

Men's handball
Silver medal – second place	1936 Berlin	Team competition

Emil Juracka (June 11, 1912 – February 21, 1944) was an Austrian field handball player who competed in the 1936 Summer Olympics.

He was part of the Austria field handball team, which won the silver medal in the tournament, where he played three matches including the final.

In 1944, Juracka was killed in action during World War II, while being treated for his injuries at the main field hospital in Toshchitsa, Russia (now Belorussia).
