= Franz Bartl =

Austrian handball player (1915-1941)

Olympic medal record

Men's handball
Silver medal – second place	1936 Berlin	Team competition

Franz Bartl (January 7, 1915 in Vienna, Austria– July 12, 1941) was an Austrian field handball player who competed in the 1936 Summer Olympics. He was part of the Austria field handball team that won the silver medal in handball at the Olympics. He played three matches during the tournament.

He was killed in action in Russia during World War II.
