= Herbert Oehmichen =

American handball player (1915–1990)

Personal information
- Full name: Herbert Karl Oehmichen
- Nationality: United States
- Born: August 14, 1915 New York, United States
- Died: July 23, 1990 (aged 74) Los Angeles, United States

Sport
- Sport: Handball

Senior clubs
- Years: Team
- –: German-American AC Queens
National team
Years	Team	Apps
–	United States	2

Herbert Karl Oehmichen (August 14, 1915 – July 23, 1990) was an American handball player. He was a member of the United States national team. He was part of the team at the 1936 Summer Olympics, playing two matches. On club level he played for German-American AC Queens in the United States.
