= Willy Schäfer (handballer) =

Swiss handball player (1913–1980)

Olympic medal record

Men's handball
Bronze medal – third place	1936 Berlin	Team competition

Willy Schäfer (30 April 1913 – 16 October 1980) was a Swiss field handball player who competed in the 1936 Summer Olympics.

He was part of the Swiss field handball team, which won the bronze medal. He played one match.
