= Charles Dauner =

American handball player (1912–1993)

Personal information
- Full name: Charles C. Dauner
- Nationality: United States
- Born: January 5, 1912 Elmhurst, Queens, United States
- Died: March 21, 1993 (aged 81) Rocky Point, New York, United States

Sport
- Sport: Handball

Senior clubs
- Years: Team
- ?-?: German Sport Club Brooklyn
National team
Years	Team	Apps	(Gls)
?-?	United States	1	(0)
- Updated on only during the 1936 Summer Olympics

Charles C. Dauner (January 5, 1912 – March 21, 1993) was an American male handball player. He was a member of the United States men's national handball team. He was a part of the team at the 1936 Summer Olympics, playing 1 match. On club level he played for German Sport Club Brooklyn in the United States.
