= Heinz Körvers =

German handball player (1915-1942)

Medal record

Men's field handball

Representing Germany

Olympic Games
Gold medal – first place	1936 Berlin	Team competition

Heinz Körvers (3 July 1915 – 29 December 1942) was a German field handball player who competed in the 1936 Summer Olympics. He was part of the German field handball team, which won the gold medal. He played one match as goalkeeper.

He was killed in action during World War II.
