= Friedrich Maurer (handballer) =

Austrian handball player (1912-1958)

Olympic medal record

Men's handball
Silver medal – second place	1936 Berlin	Team competition

Friedrich "Fritz" Maurer (18 June 1912 – 10 July 1958) was an Austrian field handball player who competed in the 1936 Summer Olympics.

He was part of the Austrian field handball team, which won the silver medal. He played two matches as goalkeeper.
