= Erich Schmitt =

Swiss handball player

Olympic medal record

Men's handball
Bronze medal – third place	1936 Berlin	Team competition

Erich Schmitt (6 August 1912 – 29 October 1979) was a Swiss field handball player who competed in the 1936 Summer Olympics.

He was part of the Suisse field handball team, which won the bronze medal. He played all five matches.
