= Rudolf Wirz =

Swiss handball player

Olympic medal record

Men's handball
Bronze medal – third place	1936 Berlin	Team competition

Rudolf Wirz (28 January 1918 – 5 November 1988) was a Swiss field handball player who competed in the 1936 Summer Olympics. He was part of the Swiss field handball team, which won the bronze medal. He played three matches.
