= Willy Hufschmid =

Swiss handball player (1918–1996)

Olympic medal record

Men's handball
Bronze medal – third place	1936 Berlin	Team competition

Willy Hufschmid (9 October 1918 – 12 December 1996) was a Swiss field handball player who competed in the 1936 Summer Olympics. He was part of the Swiss field handball team that won the bronze medal. He played three matches. Hufschmid died on 12 December 1996, at the age of 78.

== Sources ==
- Willy Hufschmid's profile at databaseOlympics
- Willy Hufschmid's profile at Sports Reference.com
