= Ferdinand Kiefler =

Austrian handball player (1913–1945)

Olympic medal record

Men's handball
Silver medal – second place	1936 Berlin	Team competition

Ferdinand Kiefler (August 4, 1913 – January 13, 1945) was an Austrian field handball player who competed in the 1936 Summer Olympics. He was part of the Austria field handball team, which won the silver medal in the tournament, where he played four matches including the final.

A forward, Kiefler domestically played for Ferrowatt Wien (Vienna). He was killed in action during the final weeks of World War II at Liblar near Köln (Cologne).
