= Erland Herkenrath =

Swiss handball player

Olympic medal record

Men's handball
Bronze medal – third place	1936 Berlin	Team competition

Erland Franz Herkenrath (September 24, 1912 – July 17, 2003) was a Swiss field handball player who competed in the 1936 Summer Olympics.

He was born in Zürich and died in Weggis. Spending his entire club career in Grasshopper Club Zürich, he became Swiss champion six times with the club.

In 1936 he played all five matches as part of the Swiss field handball team, which won the bronze medal.
