= Artur Knautz =

German handball player (1911-1943)

Medal record

Men's field handball

Representing Germany

Olympic Games
Gold medal – first place	1936 Berlin	Team competition

Artur Knautz (20 March 1911 – 1 August 1943) was a German field handball player who competed in the 1936 Summer Olympics. He was born in Daaden. He was part of the German field handball team, which won the gold medal. He played two matches including the final. He was killed in action during World War II.
