= Field handball =

11 player handball played on a grass field

Dimensions of a field of field handball played with 11 players at 1936 Summer Olympics.

Field handball (also known as outdoor handball or grass handball) is a soccer-like outdoor predecessor of what is now (indoor) handball. It was played at the Olympics once, at the 1936 Summer Olympics in Berlin. It was dominated by Germany, winning all World Championships (except when banned in 1948), with German teams (two of them post-war) never been beaten or tied by a non-German squad.

The sport is played on a grass field (similar to an association football field, using the same goals) between 90 and 110 metres (300 and 360 ft) long, 55 to 65 metres (180 to 213 ft) wide. The field has two parallel lines 35 metres (115 ft) from the goal line, which divide the field into 3 sections; each section can have up to 6 players of each team. The goal area is a semicircular line with a 13-metre (43 ft) radius, and the penalty mark at 14 metres (46 ft) from the goal. The goal is the same as in soccer, 7.32 metres (24 ft) wide and 2.44 metres (8 ft) high.

The game is played with the same ball as the indoor type, by two teams of 11 players (plus 2 reserves), and in two periods of 30 minutes each. Compared to soccer and American football, a forward handball pass is slower and shorter with the round ball being thrown rather than getting kicked like the soccer ball, or being aerodynamically shaped like the gridiron football.

Indoor handball used to be the winter alternative only. With quicker action and spectators being closer to the game, similar to basketball, it gradually grew in popularity to replace field handball also in summer. The last World Men's Championship was played in 1966 as the teams from both German states dominated the sport.

== See also ==
- Handball at the 1936 Summer Olympics
- IHF World Men's Field Handball Championship
- IHF World Women's Field Handball Championship
