= Field hockey at the 1936 Summer Olympics – Men's team squads =

Field Hockey

A total of eleven countries participated in men's field hockey at the 1936 Summer Olympics.

== Participating countries ==
Position code

- GK = Goalkeeper
- B = Back
- HB = Halfback
- FW = Forward

=== Afghanistan ===
Afghanistan had a squad of 18 players five of them are unknown. They scored seven goals but only one scorer is known.

Head coach:

No.	Pos.	Player	DoB	Age	Caps	Club	Tournament games	Tournament goals
		Abouwi Ahmad Shah			?		0	?
	B	Jammal-ud-Din Affendi	June 23, 1908	28	?		2	?
	GK	Sayed Ali Atta	August 25, 1913	22	?		2	?
	FW	Sayed Ali Babaci	March 12, 1915	21	?		2	?
	HB	Mohammad Asif Shazada	March 12, 1919	17	?		2	?
	HB	Sayed Mohammad Ayub			?		2	?
	FW	Mian Faruq Shah	June 3, 1907	29	?		1	?
	B	Hussain Fazal	October 21, 1906	29	?		2	?
	HB	Saadat Malook Shazada	August 26, 1916	19	?		2	?
	FW/B	Zahir Shah Al-Zadah	November 18, 1910	25	?		2	?
	FW	Shuja ud-Din	September 12, 1913	22	?		2	?
	FW	Mohammad Sultan	December 23, 1918	17	?		2	1
	FW	Sardar Abdul Wahid	March 12, 1901	35	?		1	?

=== Belgium ===
Belgium had a squad of 22 players six of them are unknown.

Head coach:

No.	Pos.	Player	DoB	Age	Caps	Club	Tournament games	Tournament goals
	B	Lambert Adelot	June 14, 1898	38	?		3	0
	FW	Henri Delaval	November 1, 1913	22	?		3	2
	FW	Paul Delheid	December 9, 1909	26	?		3	2
		Raymond Distave	November 12, 1913	22	?		0	0
		Louis Eloy	June 3, 1907	29	?		0	0
		Pierre Geelhand	October 21, 1906	29	?		0	0
		Willy Hagenaers	May 6, 1914	22	?		0	0
	HB	Edmond Leplat	February 8, 1911	25	?		3	0
	FW	Eugène Moreau de Melen	August 6, 1912	23	?		2	0
	FW	Édouard Portielje	October 15, 1915	20	?		3	0
	HB	Jacques Putz	October 17, 1911	24	?		3	0
	HB	Jacques Rensburg	June 8, 1903	33	?		3	1
	GK	Emmanuel Van De Merghel	November 15, 1909	26	?		3	0
	FW	Reggy Van De Putte	July 14, 1915	21	?		3	0
	FW	Albert Van Den Branden	March 23, 1910	26	?		1	0
	B	Corneille Wellens	July 14, 1905	31	?		3	0

=== Denmark ===
Denmark had a squad of 17 players.

Head coach:

No.	Pos.	Player	DoB	Age	Caps	Club	Tournament games	Tournament goals
	FW	Arne Blach	July 8, 1900	36	?	(Denmark) Skovshoved Idrætsforening	1	0
	FW	Otto Busch	August 16, 1904	19	?	(Denmark) KH København	2	1
		Jørgen Gry	May 19, 1915	21	?	(Denmark) Orient København	0	0
	B	Jørgen Robert Hansen	March 23, 1911	25	?	(Denmark) Kalundborg Hockeyklub	2	0
	HB	Henning Holst	October 25, 1891	44	?	(Denmark) Orient København	2	3
	HB	Vagn Hovard	July 28, 1914	22	?	(Denmark) KH København	1	0
	FW	Johannes Robert Jensen	February 2, 1916	20	?	(Denmark) Kalundborg Hockeyklub	2	0
	FW	Aage Kirkegaard	October 14, 1914	21	?	(Denmark) Orient København	2	1
		Gunner Larsen			?	(Denmark) Kalundborg Hockeyklub	0	0
	HB	Henry Kristian Larsen	May 16, 1914	22	?	(Denmark) Kalundborg Hockeyklub	1	0
	FW	Vagn Loft	September 24, 1915	20	?	(Denmark) Orient København	0	0
	FW	Carl Malling	May 23, 1905	31	?	(Denmark) KH København	1	0
	FW	Louis Prahm	September 15, 1912	23	?	(Denmark) Orient København	2	1
		Tage Schultz	June 16, 1916	20	?	(Denmark) Orient København	0	0
	HB	Mogens Thomassen	September 24, 1914	21	?	(Denmark) Orient København	2	0
	B	Mogens Venge	March 29, 1912	24	?	(Denmark) KH København	2	0
	GK	Carl Günther Weiss	April 29, 1915	21	?	(Denmark) KH København	2	0

=== France ===
France had a squad of 22 players four of them are unknown. They scored seven goals but only six scorers are known.

Head coach:

No.	Pos.	Player	DoB	Age	Caps	Club	Tournament games	Tournament goals
	B	Guy Chevalier	December 5, 1910	25	?		4	?
	FW	Emmanuel Gonat	October 1, 1916	19	?		2	?
	FW	Joseph Goubert	November 25, 1908	27	?		5	1
	HB	Claude Gravereaux	May 2, 1913	23	?		3	?
	HB	Félix Grimonprez	June 30, 1910	26	?	(France) Lille Hockey Club	5	?
	GK	Étienne Guibel	August 7, 1905	30	?		1	?
	HB	Guy Hénon	February 3, 1912	24	?		2	?
	FW	Charles Imbault	February 19, 1909	27	?		1	?
	B	Paul Imbault	February 19, 1909	27	?		4	?
	HB	Marcel Lachmann	December 6, 1908	27	?		1	?
	FW	Claude Roques	September 16, 1912	23	?		2	?
	FW	Jean Rouget	November 7, 1916	19	?		1	1
	FW	Paul Sartorius	September 20, 1912	23	?		4	?
	FW	Claude Soulé	November 14, 1911	24	?		5	4
	GK	Raymond Tixier	December 25, 1912	23	?		4	?
	HB	François Verger	November 29, 1911	24	?		4	?
	B	Michel Verkindère	February 9, 1911	25	?		2	?
	FW	Anatole Vologe	May 25, 1909	27	?		5	?

=== Germany ===
Germany had a squad of 22 players.

Head coach:

No.	Pos.	Player	DoB	Age	Caps	Club	Tournament games	Tournament goals
	B	Hermann auf der Heide	June 1, 1911	25	?		1	0
	FW	Ludwig Beisiegel	March 21, 1912	24	?		1	2
	FW	Erich Cuntz	December 23, 1916	19	?	(Germany) Turnverein Sachsenhausen	1	2
	GK	Karl Dröse	December 27, 1913	22	?		3	0
	HB	Alfred Gerdes	October 24, 1916	19	?		3	0
	FW	Werner Hamel	February 9, 1911	25	?	(Germany) Berliner Hockey-Club	2	1
	FW	Harald Huffmann	June 3, 1908	28	?		3	0
	HB	Erwin Keller	April 8, 1905	31	?	(Germany) Berliner Hockey-Club	3	0
	B	Herbert Kemmer	May 13, 1905	31	?		3	0
	FW	Werner Kubitzki	April 10, 1915	21	?		1	0
	FW	Paul Mehlitz	December 24, 1906	29	?		2	1
	HB	Karl Menke	July 3, 1906	30	?		1	0
	FW	Fritz Messner	January 18, 1912	24	?		3	1
	B	Detlef Okrent	October 26, 1909	26	?		1	0
	HB	Heinrich Peter	June 13, 1910	26	?	(Germany) Heidelberger Hockey-Club	1	0
	HB	Heinz Raack	May 18, 1917	19	?		1	0
	FW	Carl Ruck	December 23, 1912	23	?		1	1
	FW	Hans Scherbart	December 16, 1905	30	?		3	0
	HB	Heinz Schmalix	July 24, 1910	26	?	(Germany) Berliner Hockey-Club	3	0
	GK	Tito Warnholtz	February 17, 1906	30	?		1	0
	FW	Kurt Weiß	March 30, 1906	30	?	(Germany) Berliner Sport-Club	3	6
	B	Erich Zander	April 11, 1905	31	?		3	0

=== Hungary ===
Hungary had a squad of 21 players six of them are unknown.

Head coach:

No.	Pos.	Player	DoB	Age	Caps	Club	Tournament games	Tournament goals
	B	Béla Bácskai	April 25, 1912	24	?	(Hungary) Magyar Hockey Club	1	0
	FW	Zoltán Berkes	October 1, 1916	19	?	(Hungary) Magyar Athlétikai Club	1	0
	HB	Dénes Birkás	March 13, 1907	29	?	(Hungary) Budapesti (Budai) Torna Egylet	3	0
	GK	István Csák	February 18, 1915	21	?	(Hungary) Magyar Athlétikai Club	3	0
	FW	László Cseri	June 6, 1912	24	?	(Hungary) Amateur Hockey Club	3	1
	FW	Béla Háray	March 25, 1915	21	?	(Hungary) Budapesti (Budai) Torna Egylet	3	2
	HB	Gyula Kormos	December 27, 1911	24	?	(Hungary) Amateur Hockey Club	2	0
	B	Gusztáv Lifkai	June 11, 1912	24	?	(Hungary) Amateur Hockey Club	3	0
	B	Róbert Lifkai	July 20, 1916	20	?	(Hungary) Amateur Hockey Club	1	0
	FW	Tamás Márffy	March 20, 1907	29	?	(Hungary) Magyar Hockey Club	2	1
	FW	György Margó	May 15, 1912	24	?	(Hungary) Magyar Hockey Club	2	0
	HB	Ferenc Miklós	August 7, 1909	26	?	(Hungary) Magyar Hockey Club	3	0
	HB/B	Ferenc Szamosi	February 15, 1915	21	?	(Hungary) Budapesti (Budai) Torna Egylet	2	0
	FW	Géza Teleki	November 27, 1911	24	?	(Hungary) Magyar Hockey Club	3	0
	HB/FW	Zoltán Turcsányi	November 7, 1914	21	?	(Hungary) Budapesti (Budai) Torna Egylet	1	0

=== India ===
India had a squad of 22 players three of them are unknown.

Head coach:

No.	Pos.	Player	DoB	Age	Caps	Club	Tournament games	Tournament goals
	GK	Richard Allen	June 4, 1902	34	?	(British Raj) Port Commissioners, Calcutta	4	0
	FW	Dhyan Chand	August 29, 1905	30	?	(British Raj) HC United Provinces	5	13
	FW	Ali Dara	April 1, 1915	21	?		2	4
	FW	Lionel Emmett	January 8, 1913	23	?	(British Raj) HC Bengal	1	0
	FW	Peter Fernandes	September 15, 1916	19	?	(British Raj) HC Sindh	2	0
	HB	Joseph Galibardy	January 10, 1915	21	?	(British Raj) HC Bengal	5	0
	HB	Earnest Goodsir-Cullen	July 15, 1912	24	?	(British Raj) HC Madras	5	4
	B	Mohammed Hussain	October 1, 1911	24	?	(British Raj) Manavdar	4	0
	FW	Sayed Jaffar	1911		?	(British Raj) HC Punjab	5	3
	FW	Ahmed Sher Khan	November 1, 1912	23	?	(British Raj) HC Bhopal	1	0
	HB	Ahsan Khan	April 7, 1916	20	?	(British Raj) HC Bhopal	1	0
	HB	Mirza Masood	November 23, 1908	27	?	(British Raj) HC Manavdar	1	0
	GK	Cyril Michie	August 20, 1900	35	?	(British Raj) HC Bengal	1	0
	HB	Baboo Nimal	March 15, 1908	28	?	(British Raj) HC Bombay	3	0
	B	Joseph Phillips	March 24, 1911	25	?	(British Raj) HC Bombay	1	0
	FW	Shabban Shahab-ud-Din	November 8, 1909	26	?	(British Raj) HC Manavdar	4	1
	B	G.S. Garewal	May 4, 1911	25	?	(British Raj) HC Punjab	1	0
	FW	Roop Singh	September 8, 1910	25	?	(British Raj) HC United Provinces	5	10
	B	Carlyle Tapsell	July 24, 1909	27	?	(British Raj) HC Bengal	4	3

Richard Carr was part of the original team but when he could not get leave from his employer, Ahmed Sher Khan was selected in his place.

=== Japan ===
Japan had a squad of 15 players four of them are unknown.

Head coach:

No.	Pos.	Player	DoB	Age	Caps	Club	Tournament games	Tournament goals
	GK	Shunkichi Hamada	October 19, 1910	25	?		3	?
	B	Michihiro Ito	March 20, 1915	21	?		3	?
	FW	Takeo Ito	January 5, 1915	21	?		3	?
	FW	Makoto Kikuchi	1911		?		3	?
	HB	Daiji Kurauchi	1913		?		3	?
	B	Toshio Ohtsu	January 23, 1912	24	?		3	?
	HB	Yoshio Sakai	May 2, 1910	26	?		3	?
	HB	Osamu Takechi	1914		?		3	?
	FW	Noboru Tanaka	1912		?		3	?
	FW	Sadao Wakizaka	1916		?		3	?
	FW	Takehiko Yanagi	March 28, 1916	20	?		3	?

=== Netherlands ===
The Netherlands had a squad of 18 players six of them are unknown.

Head coach:

No.	Pos.	Player	DoB	Age	Caps	Club	Tournament games	Tournament goals
	FW	Ernst van den Berg	December 3, 1915	20	?	(Netherlands) Hockeyclub Amsterdam	5	6
	FW	Piet Gunning	July 5, 1913	23	?	(Netherlands) Hockeyclub Amsterdam	5	1
	HB	Ru van der Haar	October 6, 1913	22	?	(Netherlands) Hockeyclub Amsterdam	5	1
	FW	Inge Heybroek	October 12, 1915	20	?	(Netherlands) Hockeyclub Amsterdam	4	0
	HB	Tonny van Lierop	September 9, 1910	25	?	(Netherlands) Hockeyclub Amsterdam	5	0
	HB	Henk de Looper	December 26, 1912	23	?	(Netherlands) Hilversumse Mixed Hockey Club	5	0
	GK	Jan de Looper	May 2, 1914	22	?	(Netherlands) Hockeyclub Bloemendaal	5	0
	FW	Aat de Roos	April 15, 1919	17	?	(Netherlands) DKS	4	1
	FW	Hans Schnitger	August 5, 1915	20	?	(Netherlands) HTCC, Eindhoven	5	4
	FW	René Sparenberg	December 3, 1918	17	?	(Netherlands) Hockeyclub Amsterdam	5	0
	B	Rein de Waal	November 24, 1904	31	?	(Netherlands) Delftsche Studenten Hockeyclub	5	0
	B	Max Westerkamp	October 8, 1912	23	?	(Netherlands) HGC	5	0

=== Switzerland ===
Switzerland had a squad of 22 players nine of them are unknown. They scored three goals but only two scorers are known.

Head coach:

No.	Pos.	Player	DoB	Age	Caps	Club	Tournament games	Tournament goals
	FW	Roland Annen	September 22, 1916	19	?		3	1
	FW	René Courvoisier	June 9, 1907	29	?		2	1
	HB/FW	Adolf Fehr	November 25, 1908	27	?		3	?
	FW	Konrad Fehr	December 9, 1910	25	?		2	?
	HB/FW	Louis Gilliéron	November 18, 1909	26	?		3	?
	FW	Jean Grüner	October 10, 1916	19	?		1	?
	B	Fridolin Kurmann	December 12, 1912	23	?		3	?
	B	Charles Légeret	August 19, 1909	26	?		3	?
	HB	Giancarlo Luzzani	May 12, 1912	24	?		1	?
	FW/HB	Walther Meier	August 28, 1910	25	?		3	?
	HB	Walter Scherrer	December 3, 1908	27	?		3	?
	FW	Roger Toffel	October 8, 1909	26	?		3	?
	GK	Ernst Tüscher	August 3, 1911	25	?		3	?

=== United States ===
The United States had a squad of 15 players.

Head coach: Frank Kavanaugh as coach and Leonard O'Brien as playing manager

No.	Pos.	Player	DoB	Age	Caps	Club	Tournament games	Tournament goals
	FW	William Boddington	November 22, 1910	25	?	(United States) Westchester Field Hockey Club	3	0
	FW	Lanphear Buck	December 9, 1901	34	?	(United States) Westchester Field Hockey Club	1	0
	FW	Amos Deacon	May 28, 1904	32	?	(United States) Germantown Cricket Club	2	0
	HB	Horace Disston	January 7, 1906	30	?	(United States) Philadelphia Cricket Club	3	1
	B	Samuel Ewing	July 27, 1906	30	?	(United States) Merion Cricket Club	2	0
	GK	Paul Fentress	November 13, 1913	22	?	(United States) Princeton University	3	0
	HB	James Gentle	July 21, 1904	21	?	(United States) Philadelphia Cricket Club	3	0
	B/HB	Ellwood Godfrey	July 17, 1910	26	?	(United States) Philadelphia Cricket Club	2	0
		Wilson Hobson			?		0	0
	FW	Lawrence Knapp	May 30, 1905	31	?	(United States) Westchester Field Hockey Club	1	0
	FW	David McMullin	June 30, 1908	28	?	(United States) Philadelphia Cricket Club	3	0
	B	Leonard O'Brien	January 20, 1904	32	?		3	0
	FW	Charles Sheaffer	December 6, 1904	31	?	(United States) Merion Cricket Club	3	1
	FW	Alexis Thompson	May 20, 1914	22	?	(United States) Yale University	1	0
	HB/FW	John Turnbull	June 30, 1910	26	?	(United States) Mt. Washington Club	3	0
