= List of 1936 Summer Olympics medal winners =

The 1936 Summer Olympics were held in Berlin, Nazi Germany, from 1 to 15 August 1936.

== Athletics ==
=== Medal table ===
* Host nation (Germany)

Rank	Nation	Gold	Silver	Bronze	Total
1	United States	14	7	4	25
2	Germany*	5	4	7	16
3	Finland	3	5	2	10
4	Great Britain	2	5	0	7
5	Japan	2	2	3	7
6	Italy	1	2	2	5
7	Hungary	1	0	0	1
7	New Zealand	1	0	0	1
9	Poland	0	2	1	3
10	Canada	0	1	3	4
11	Switzerland	0	1	0	1
12	Netherlands	0	0	2	2
12	Sweden	0	0	2	2
14	Australia	0	0	1	1
14	Latvia	0	0	1	1
14	Philippines	0	0	1	1
Totals (16 entries)		29	29	29	87

=== Men's events ===
Event	Gold		Silver		Bronze	
100 metres	Jesse Owens; United States	10.3	Ralph Metcalfe; United States	10.4	Tinus Osendarp; Netherlands	10.5
200 metres	Jesse Owens; United States	20.7	Mack Robinson; United States	21.1	Tinus Osendarp; Netherlands	21.3
400 metres	Archie Williams; United States	46.5	Godfrey Brown; Great Britain	46.7	Jimmy LuValle; United States	46.8
800 metres	John Woodruff; United States	1:52.9	Mario Lanzi; Italy	1:53.3	Phil Edwards; Canada	1:53.6
1500 metres	Jack Lovelock; New Zealand	3:47.8	Glenn Cunningham; United States	3:48.4	Luigi Beccali; Italy	3:49.2
5000 metres	Gunnar Höckert; Finland	14:22.2	Lauri Lehtinen; Finland	14:25.8	Henry Jonsson; Sweden	14:29.0
10,000 metres	Ilmari Salminen; Finland	30:15.4	Arvo Askola; Finland	30:15.6	Volmari Iso-Hollo; Finland	30:20.2
110 metres hurdles	Forrest Towns; United States	14.2	Don Finlay; Great Britain	14.4	Fritz Pollard; United States	14.4
400 metres hurdles	Glenn Hardin; United States	52.4	John Loaring; Canada	52.7	Miguel White; Philippines	52.8
3000 metres steeplechase	Volmari Iso-Hollo; Finland	9:03.8	Kaarlo Tuominen; Finland	9:06.8	Alfred Dompert; Germany	9:07.2
4 × 100 metres relay	United States; Jesse Owens; Ralph Metcalfe; Foy Draper; Frank Wykoff	39.8	Italy; Orazio Mariani; Gianni Caldana; Elio Ragni; Tullio Gonnelli	41.1	Germany; Wilhelm Leichum; Erich Borchmeyer; Erwin Gillmeister; Gerd Hornberger	41.2
4 × 400 metres relay	Great Britain; Freddie Wolff; Godfrey Rampling; Bill Roberts; Godfrey Brown	3:09.0	United States; Harold Cagle; Robert Young; Edward O’Brien; Al Fitch	3:11.0	Germany; Helmut Hamann; Friedrich Von Stülpnagel; Harry Voigt; Rudolf Harbig	3:11.8
Marathon	Son Kitei; Japan	2:29:19.2	Ernest Harper; Great Britain	2:31:23.2	Nan Shoryu; Japan	2:31:42.0
50 kilometres walk	Harold Whitlock; Great Britain	4:30:41.4	Arthur Tell Schwab; Switzerland	4:32:09.2	Adalberts Bubenko; Latvia	4:32:42.2
High jump	Cornelius Johnson; United States	2.03 m	Dave Albritton; United States	2.00 m	Delos Thurber; United States	2.00 m
Pole vault	Earle Meadows; United States	4.35 m	Shuhei Nishida; Japan	4.25 m	Sueo Ōe; Japan	4.25 m
Long jump	Jesse Owens; United States	8.06 m	Luz Long; Germany	7.87 m	Naoto Tajima; Japan	7.74 m
Triple jump	Naoto Tajima; Japan	16.00 m	Masao Harada; Japan	15.66 m	Jack Metcalfe; Australia	15.50 m
Shot put	Hans Woellke; Germany	16.20 m	Sulo Bärlund; Finland	16.12 m	Gerhard Stöck; Germany	15.66 m
Discus throw	Ken Carpenter; United States	50.48 m	Gordon Dunn; United States	49.36 m	Giorgio Oberweger; Italy	49.23 m
Hammer throw	Karl Hein; Germany	56.49 m	Erwin Blask; Germany	55.04 m	Fred Warngård; Sweden	54.83 m
Javelin throw	Gerhard Stöck; Germany	71.84 m	Yrjö Nikkanen; Finland	70.77 m	Kalervo Toivonen; Finland	70.72 m
Decathlon	Glenn Morris; United States	7900	Bob Clark; United States	7601	Jack Parker; United States	7275

=== Women's events ===
Games	Gold		Silver		Bronze	
100 metres	Helen Stephens; United States	11.5	Stanisława Walasiewicz; Poland	11.7	Käthe Krauß; Germany	11.9
80 metres hurdles	Trebisonda Valla; Italy	11.7	Anni Steuer; Germany	11.7	Betty Taylor; Canada	11.7
4 × 100 metres relay	United States; Harriet Bland; Annette Rogers; Betty Robinson; Helen Stephens	46.9	Great Britain; Eileen Hiscock; Violet Olney; Audrey Brown; Barbara Burke	47.6	Canada; Dorothy Brookshaw; Mildred Dolson; Hilda Cameron; Aileen Meagher	47.8
High jump	Ibolya Csák; Hungary	1.60 m	Dorothy Odam; Great Britain	1.60 m	Elfriede Kaun; Germany	1.60 m
Discus throw	Gisela Mauermayer; Germany	47.63 m	Jadwiga Wajs; Poland	46.22 m	Paula Mollenhauer; Germany	39.80 m
Javelin throw	Tilly Fleischer; Germany	45.18 m	Luise Krüger; Germany	43.29 m	Maria Kwaśniewska; Poland	41.80 m

== Basketball ==
=== Medal table ===
Rank	NOC	Gold	Silver	Bronze	Total
1	United States	1	0	0	1
2	Canada	0	1	0	1
3	Mexico	0	0	1	1
Totals (3 entries)		1	1	1	3

=== Medalists ===
Event	Gold	Silver	Bronze
Men's	United States; Sam Balter; Ralph Bishop; Joe Fortenberry; Tex Gibbons; Francis Johnson; Carl Knowles; Frank Lubin; Art Mollner; Donald Piper; Jack Ragland; Willard Schmidt; Carl Shy; Duane Swanson; Bill Wheatley	Canada; Gordon Aitchison; Ian Allison; Art Chapman; Chuck Chapman; Edward Dawson; Irving Meretsky; Doug Peden; James Stewart; Malcolm Wiseman; Stanley Nantais	Mexico; Carlos Borja; Víctor Borja; Rodolfo Choperena; Luis de la Vega; Raúl Fernández; Andrés Gómez; Silvio Hernández; Francisco Martínez; Jesús Olmos; José Pamplona; Greer Skousen

== Boxing ==
=== Medal table ===
* Host nation (Germany)

Rank	Nation	Gold	Silver	Bronze	Total
1	Germany*	2	2	1	5
2	France	2	0	0	2
3	Argentina	1	1	2	4
4	Italy	1	1	0	2
5	Finland	1	0	0	1
5	Hungary	1	0	0	1
7	Norway	0	1	1	2
7	United States	0	1	1	2
9	Estonia	0	1	0	1
9	South Africa	0	1	0	1
11	Denmark	0	0	1	1
11	Mexico	0	0	1	1
11	Sweden	0	0	1	1
Totals (13 entries)		8	8	8	24

=== Medalists ===
Games	Gold	Silver	Bronze
Flyweight (−50.8 kg / 112 lb)	Willy Kaiser; Germany	Gavino Matta; Italy	Louis Laurie; United States
Bantamweight (−53.5 kg / 118 lb)	Ulderico Sergo; Italy	Jack Wilson; United States	Fidel Ortiz; Mexico
Featherweight (−57.2 kg / 126 lb)	Oscar Casanovas; Argentina	Charles Catterall; South Africa	Josef Miner; Germany
Lightweight (−61.2 kg / 135 lb)	Imre Harangi; Hungary	Nikolai Stepulov; Estonia	Erik Ågren; Sweden
Welterweight (−66.7 kg / 147 lb)	Sten Suvio; Finland	Michael Murach; Germany	Gerhard Pedersen; Denmark
Middleweight (−72.6 kg / 160 lb)	Jean Despeaux; France	Henry Tiller; Norway	Raúl Villarreal; Argentina
Light heavyweight (−79.4 kg / 175 lb)	Roger Michelot; France	Richard Vogt; Germany	Francisco Risiglione; Argentina
Heavyweight (over 79.4 kg/175 lb)	Herbert Runge; Germany	Guillermo Lovell; Argentina	Erling Nilsen; Norway

== Canoeing ==
=== Medal table ===
* Host nation (Germany)

Rank	Nation	Gold	Silver	Bronze	Total
1	Austria	3	3	1	7
2	Germany*	2	3	2	7
3	Czechoslovakia	2	1	0	3
4	Canada	1	1	1	3
5	Sweden	1	0	1	2
6	France	0	1	0	1
7	Netherlands	0	0	3	3
8	United States	0	0	1	1
Totals (8 entries)		9	9	9	27

=== Medalists ===
Games	Gold	Silver	Bronze
C-1 1000 metres	Frank Amyot; Canada	Bohuslav Karlík; Czechoslovakia	Erich Koschik; Germany
C-2 1000 metres	Czechoslovakia; Jan Brzák-Felix; Vladimír Syrovátka	Austria; Rupert Weinstabl; Karl Proisl	Canada; Frank Saker; Harvey Charters
C-2 10000 metres	Czechoslovakia; Václav Mottl; Zdeněk Škrland	Canada; Frank Saker; Harvey Charters	Austria; Rupert Weinstabl; Karl Proisl
K-1 1000 metres	Gregor Hradetzky; Austria	Helmut Cämmerer; Germany	Jaap Kraaier; Netherlands
K-1 10000 metres	Ernst Krebs; Germany	Fritz Landertinger; Austria	Ernest Riedel; United States
K-1 10000 metres folding	Gregor Hradetzky; Austria	Henri Eberhardt; France	Xaver Hörmann; Germany
K-2 1000 metres	Austria; Adolf Kainz; Alfons Dorfner	Germany; Ewald Tilker; Fritz Bondroit	Netherlands; Nicolaas Tates; Wim van der Kroft
K-2 10000 metres	Germany; Paul Wevers; Ludwig Landen	Austria; Viktor Kalisch; Karl Steinhuber	Sweden; Tage Fahlborg; Helge Larsson
K-2 10000 metres folding	Sweden; Erik Bladström; Sven Johansson	Germany; Erich Hanisch; Willi Horn	Netherlands; Piet Wijdekop; Kees Wijdekop

== Cycling ==
=== Medal table ===
* Host nation (Germany)

Rank	Nation	Gold	Silver	Bronze	Total
1	France	3	2	2	7
2	Germany*	2	0	1	3
3	Netherlands	1	2	0	3
4	Switzerland	0	1	1	2
5	Italy	0	1	0	1
6	Belgium	0	0	1	1
6	Great Britain	0	0	1	1
Totals (7 entries)		6	6	6	18

=== Road cycling ===
Games	Gold	Silver	Bronze
Individual road race	Robert Charpentier; France	Guy Lapébie; France	Ernst Nievergelt; Switzerland
Team road race	France; Robert Charpentier; Robert Dorgebray; Guy Lapébie	Switzerland; Edgar Buchwalder; Ernst Nievergelt; Kurt Ott	Belgium; Auguste Garrebeek; Armand Putzeys; François Vandermotte

=== Track cycling ===
Games	Gold	Silver	Bronze
Team pursuit	France; Roger-Jean Le Nizerhy; Robert Charpentier; Jean Goujon; Guy Lapébie	Italy; Severino Rigoni; Bianco Bianchi; Mario Gentili; Armando Latini	Great Britain; Ernie Mills; Harry Hill; Ernest Johnson; Charles King
Sprint	Toni Merkens; Germany	Arie van Vliet; Netherlands	Louis Chaillot; France
Tandem	Germany; Ernst Ihbe; Carl Lorenz	Netherlands; Bernhard Leene; Hendrik Ooms	France; Pierre Georget; Georges Maton
1000 metres time trial	Arie van Vliet; Netherlands	Pierre Georget; France	Rudolf Karsch; Germany

== Diving ==
=== Medal table ===
* Host nation (Germany)

Rank	Nation	Gold	Silver	Bronze	Total
1	United States	4	4	2	10
2	Germany*	0	0	2	2
Totals (2 entries)		4	4	4	12

=== Men's events ===
Event	Gold	Silver	Bronze
3 m springboard	Richard Degener; United States	Marshall Wayne; United States	Alan Greene; United States
10 m platform	Marshall Wayne; United States	Elbert Root; United States	Hermann Stork; Germany

=== Women's events ===
Event	Gold	Silver	Bronze
3 m springboard	Marjorie Gestring; United States	Katherine Rawls; United States	Dorothy Poynton-Hill; United States
10 m platform	Dorothy Poynton-Hill; United States	Velma Dunn; United States	Käthe Köhler; Germany

== Equestrian events ==
=== Medal table ===
* Host nation (Germany)

Rank	Nation	Gold	Silver	Bronze	Total
1	Germany*	6	1	0	7
2	France	0	1	0	1
2	Netherlands	0	1	0	1
2	Poland	0	1	0	1
2	Romania	0	1	0	1
2	United States	0	1	0	1
7	Austria	0	0	1	1
7	Denmark	0	0	1	1
7	Great Britain	0	0	1	1
7	Hungary	0	0	1	1
7	Portugal	0	0	1	1
7	Sweden	0	0	1	1
Totals (12 entries)		6	6	6	18

=== Medalists ===
Games	Gold	Silver	Bronze
Individual dressage	Heinz Pollay on Kronos (GER)	Friedrich Gerhard on Absinth (GER)	Alois Podhajsky on Nero (AUT)
Team dressage	Germany; Heinz Pollay on Kronos; Friedrich Gerhard on Absinth; Hermann von Oppeln-Bronikowski on Gimpel	France; André Jousseaume on Favorite; Gérard de Ballorre on Debaucheur; Daniel Gillois on Nicolas	Sweden; Gregor Adlercreutz on Teresina; Sven Colliander on Kål XX; Folke Sandström on Pergola
Individual eventing	Ludwig Stubbendorf on Nurmi (GER)	Earl Foster Thomson on Jenny Camp (USA)	Hans Lunding on Jason (DEN)
Team eventing	Germany; Ludwig Stubbendorf on Nurmi; Rudolf Lippert on Fasan; Konrad Freiherr von Wangenheim on Kurfürst	Poland; Henryk Roycewicz on Arlekin III; Zdzisław Kawecki on Bambino; Seweryn Kulesza on Tóska	Great Britain; Alec Scott on Bob Clive; Edward Howard-Vyse on Blue Steel; Richard Fanshawe on Bowie Knife
Individual jumping	Kurt Hasse and Tora (GER)	Henri Rang and Delfis (ROU)	József von Platthy and Sellő (HUN)
Team jumping	Germany; Kurt Hasse and Tora; Marten von Barnekow and Nordland; Heinz Brandt and Alchimist	Netherlands; Johan Greter and Ernica; Jan de Bruine and Trixie; Henri van Schaik and Santa Bell	Portugal; José Beltrão and Biscuit; Domingos de Sousa and Merle Blanc; Luís Mena e Silva and Fossette

== Fencing ==
=== Medal table ===
* Host nation (Germany)

Rank	Nation	Gold	Silver	Bronze	Total
1	Italy	4	3	2	9
2	Hungary	3	0	1	4
3	France	0	2	1	3
4	Germany*	0	1	2	3
5	Sweden	0	1	0	1
6	Austria	0	0	1	1
Totals (6 entries)		7	7	7	21

=== Men's events ===
Event	Gold	Silver	Bronze
Individual épée	Franco Riccardi; Italy	Saverio Ragno; Italy	Giancarlo Cornaggia Medici; Italy
Team épée	Italy; Alfredo Pezzana; Edoardo Mangiarotti; Saverio Ragno; Giancarlo C. Cornaggia-Medici; Giancarlo Brusati; Franco Riccardi	Sweden; Hans Drakenberg; Hans Granfelt; Gustaf Dyrssen; Gustav Almgren; Birger Cederin; Sven Thofelt	France; Henri Dulieux; Philippe Cattiau; Georges Buchard; Paul Wormser; Michel Pécheux; Bernard Schmetz
Individual foil	Giulio Gaudini; Italy	Edward Gardère; France	Giorgio Bocchino; Italy
Team foil	Italy; Giorgio Bocchino; Manlio Di Rosa; Gioachino Guaragna; Ciro Verratti; Giulio Gaudini; Gustavo Marzi	France; Edward Gardère; André Gardere; Jacques Coutrot; René Bougnol; René Bondoux; René Lemoine	Germany; Siegfried Lerdon; August Heim; Erwin Casmir; Julius Eisenecker; Stefan Rosenbauer; Otto Adam
Individual sabre	Endre Kabos; Hungary	Gustavo Marzi; Italy	Aladár Gerevich; Hungary
Team sabre	Hungary; Pál Kovács; Tibor Berczelly; Imre Rajczy; Aladár Gerevich; Endre Kabos; László Rajcsányi	Italy; Vincenzo Pinton; Aldo Masciotta; Athos Tanzini; Aldo Montano; Gustavo Marzi; Giulio Gaudini	Germany; Hans Jörger; Julius Eisenecker; August Heim; Erwin Casmir; Richard Wahl; Hans Esser

=== Women's event ===
Event	Gold	Silver	Bronze
Individual foil	Ilona Elek; Hungary	Helene Mayer; Germany	Ellen Preis; Austria

== Field hockey ==
=== Medal table ===
* Host nation (Germany)

Rank	Nation	Gold	Silver	Bronze	Total
1	India	1	0	0	1
2	Germany*	0	1	0	1
3	Netherlands	0	0	1	1
Totals (3 entries)		1	1	1	3

=== Medalists ===
Games	Gold	Silver	Bronze
Men's	India; Richard Allen; Dhyan Chand; Ali Dara; Lionel Emmett; Peter Fernandes; Joseph Galibardy; Earnest Goodsir-Cullen; Mohammed Hussain; Sayed Jaffar; Ahmed Khan; Ahsan Khan; Mirza Masood; Cyril Michie; Baboo Nimal; Joseph Phillips; Shabban Shahab-ud-Din; G.S. Garewal; Roop Singh; Carlyle Tapsell	Germany; Hermann auf der Heide; Ludwig Beisiegel; Erich Cuntz; Karl Dröse; Alfred Gerdes; Werner Hamel; Harald Huffmann; Erwin Keller; Herbert Kemmer; Werner Kubitzki; Paul Mehlitz; Karl Menke; Fritz Messner; Detlef Okrent; Heinrich Peter; Heinz Raack; Carl Ruck; Hans Scherbart; Heinz Schmalix; Tito Warnholtz; Kurt Weiß; Erich Zander	Netherlands; Ernst van den Berg; Piet Gunning; Ru van der Haar; Inge Heybroek; Tonny van Lierop; Henk de Looper; Jan de Looper; Aat de Roos; Hans Schnitger; René Sparenberg; Rein de Waal; Max Westerkamp

== Football ==
=== Medal table ===
Rank	Nation	Gold	Silver	Bronze	Total
1	Italy	1	0	0	1
2	Austria	0	1	0	1
3	Norway	0	0	1	1
Totals (3 entries)		1	1	1	3

=== Medalists ===
Event	Gold	Silver	Bronze
Men's	Italy; Bruno Venturini; Alfredo Foni; Pietro Rava; Giuseppe Baldo; Achille Piccini; Ugo Locatelli; Annibale Frossi; Libero Marchini; Luigi Scarabello; Carlo Biagi; Giulio Cappelli; Sergio Bertoni; Alfonso Negro; Francesco Gabriotti	Austria; Franz Fuchsberger; Max Hofmeister; Eduard Kainberger; Karl Kainberger; Martin Kargl; Josef Kitzmüller; Anton Krenn; Ernst Künz; Adolf Laudon; Franz Mandl; Klement Steinmetz; Karl Wahlmüller; Walter Werginz	Norway; Henry Johansen; Fredrik Horn; Nils Eriksen; Frithjof Ulleberg; Jørgen Juve; Rolf Holmberg; Sverre Hansen; Magnar Isaksen; Alf Martinsen; Reidar Kvammen; Arne Brustad; Øivind Holmsen; Odd Frantzen; Magdalon Monsen

== Gymnastics ==
=== Medal table ===
* Host nation (Germany)

Rank	Nation	Gold	Silver	Bronze	Total
1	Germany*	6	1	6	13
2	Switzerland	1	6	2	9
3	Czechoslovakia	1	1	0	2
4	Finland	1	0	1	2
5	Yugoslavia	0	1	0	1
6	Hungary	0	0	1	1
Totals (6 entries)		9	9	10	28

=== Men's events ===
Games	Gold	Silver	Bronze
Individual all-around	Alfred Schwarzmann; Germany	Eugen Mack; Switzerland	Konrad Frey; Germany
Team all-around	Germany; Franz Beckert; Konrad Frey; Alfred Schwarzmann; Willi Stadel; Inno Stangl; Walter Steffens; Matthias Volz; Ernst Winter	Switzerland; Walter Bach; Albert Bachmann; Walter Beck; Eugen Mack; Georges Miez; Michael Reusch; Eduard Steinemann; Josef Walter	Finland; Mauri Nyberg-Noroma; Veikko Pakarinen; Aleksanteri Saarvala; Heikki Savolainen; Esa Seeste; Einari Teräsvirta; Eino Tukiainen; Martti Uosikkinen
Floor exercise	Georges Miez; Switzerland	Josef Walter; Switzerland	Konrad Frey; Germany
Floor exercise	Georges Miez; Switzerland	Josef Walter; Switzerland	Eugen Mack; Switzerland
Horizontal bar	Aleksanteri Saarvala; Finland	Konrad Frey; Germany	Alfred Schwarzmann; Germany
Parallel bars	Konrad Frey; Germany	Michael Reusch; Switzerland	Alfred Schwarzmann; Germany
Pommel horse	Konrad Frey; Germany	Eugen Mack; Switzerland	Albert Bachmann; Switzerland
Rings	Alois Hudec; Czechoslovakia	Leon Štukelj; Yugoslavia	Matthias Volz; Germany
Vault	Alfred Schwarzmann; Germany	Eugen Mack; Switzerland	Matthias Volz; Germany

=== Women's event ===
Games	Gold	Silver	Bronze
Team all-around	Germany; Anita Bärwirth; Erna Bürger; Isolde Frölian; Friedl Iby; Trudi Meyer; Paula Pöhlsen; Julie Schmitt; Käthe Sohnemann	Czechoslovakia; Jaroslava Bajerová; Vlasta Děkanová; Božena Dobešová; Vlasta Foltová; Anna Hřebřinová; Matylda Pálfyová; Zdeňka Veřmiřovská; Marie Větrovská	Hungary; Margit Csillik; Margit Kalocsai; Ilona Madary; Gabriella Mészáros; Margit Nagy; Olga Törös; Judit Tóth; Eszter Voit

== Handball ==
=== Medal table ===
* Host nation (Germany)

Rank	Nation	Gold	Silver	Bronze	Total
1	Germany*	1	0	0	1
2	Austria	0	1	0	1
3	Switzerland	0	0	1	1
Totals (3 entries)		1	1	1	3

=== Medalists ===
Event	Gold	Silver	Bronze
Men's	Germany; Willy Bandholz; Wilhelm Baumann; Helmut Berthold; Helmut Braselmann; Wilhelm Brinkmann; Georg Dascher; Kurt Dossin; Fritz Fromm; Hermann Hansen; Erich Herrmann; Heinrich Keimig; Hans Keiter; Alfred Klingler; Artur Knautz; Heinz Körvers; Karl Kreutzberg; Wilhelm Müller; Günther Ortmann; Edgar Reinhardt; Fritz Spengler; Rudolf Stahl; Hans Theilig	Austria; Franz Bartl; Franz Berghammer; Franz Bistricky; Franz Brunner; Johann Houschka; Emil Juracka; Ferdinand Kiefler; Josef Krejci; Otto Licha; Friedrich Maurer; Anton Perwein; Siegfried Powolny; Siegfried Purner; Walter Reisp; Alfred Schmalzer; Alois Schnabel; Ludwig Schuberth; Johann Tauscher; Jaroslav Volak; Leopold Wohlrab; Friedrich Wurmböck; Johann Zehetner	Switzerland; Max Bloesch; Rolf Fäs; Burkhard Gantenbein; Willy Gysi; Erland Herkenrath; Ernst Hufschmid; Willy Hufschmid; Werner Meyer; Georg Mischon; Willy Schäfer; Werner Scheurmann; Edy Schmid; Erich Schmitt; Eugen Seiterle; Max Streib; Robert Studer; Rudolf Wirz

== Modern pentathlon ==
=== Medal table ===
* Host nation (Germany)

Rank	Nation	Gold	Silver	Bronze	Total
1	Germany*	1	0	0	1
2	United States	0	1	0	1
3	Italy	0	0	1	1
Totals (3 entries)		1	1	1	3

=== Medalists ===
Event	Gold	Silver	Bronze
Individual	Gotthard Handrick; Germany	Charles Leonard; United States	Silvano Abbà; Italy

== Polo ==
=== Medal table ===
Rank	Nation	Gold	Silver	Bronze	Total
1	Argentina	1	0	0	1
2	Great Britain	0	1	0	1
3	Mexico	0	0	1	1
Totals (3 entries)		1	1	1	3

=== Medalists ===
Event	Gold	Silver	Bronze
Men's	Argentina; Manuel Andrada; Roberto Cavanagh; Luis Duggan; Andrés Gazzotti	Great Britain; David Dawnay; Bryan Fowler; Humphrey Patrick Guinness; William Hinde	Mexico; Juan Gracia; Julio Mueller; Antonio Nava; Alberto Ramos

== Rowing ==
=== Medal table ===
* Host nation (Germany)

Rank	Nation	Gold	Silver	Bronze	Total
1	Germany*	5	1	1	7
2	Great Britain	1	1	0	2
3	United States	1	0	1	2
4	Italy	0	2	0	2
5	Switzerland	0	1	1	2
6	Austria	0	1	0	1
6	Denmark	0	1	0	1
8	France	0	0	2	2
9	Argentina	0	0	1	1
9	Poland	0	0	1	1
Totals (10 entries)		7	7	7	21

=== Medalists ===
Games	Gold	Silver	Bronze
Single sculls	Gustav Schäfer; Germany	Josef Hasenöhrl; Austria	Dan Barrow; United States
Double sculls	Great Britain; Jack Beresford; Dick Southwood	Germany; Willi Kaidel; Joachim Pirsch	Poland; Roger Verey; Jerzy Ustupski
Coxless pair	Germany; Willi Eichhorn; Hugo Strauß	Denmark; Harry Larsen; Richard Olsen	Argentina; Horacio Podestá; Julio Curatella
Coxed pair	Germany; Gerhard Gustmann; Herbert Adamski; Dieter Arend	Italy; Almiro Bergamo; Guido Santin; Luciano Negrini	France; Marceau Fourcade; Georges Tapie; Noël Vandernotte
Coxless four	Germany; Rudolf Eckstein; Anton Rom; Martin Karl; Wilhelm Menne	Great Britain; Martin Bristow; Alan Barrett; Peter Jackson; John Sturrock	Switzerland; Hermann Betschart; Hans Homberger; Alex Homberger; Karl Schmid
Coxed four	Germany; Hans Maier; Walter Volle; Ernst Gaber; Paul Söllner; Fritz Bauer	Switzerland; Hermann Betschart; Hans Homberger; Alex Homberger; Karl Schmid; Rolf Spring	France; Fernand Vandernotte; Marcel Vandernotte; Jean Cosmat; Marcel Chauvigné; Noël Vandernotte
Eight	United States; Herbert Morris; Charles Day; Gordon Adam; John White; James McMillin; George Hunt; Joe Rantz; Donald Hume; Robert Moch	Italy; Guglielmo Del Bimbo; Dino Barsotti; Oreste Grossi; Enzo Bartolini; Mario Checcacci; Dante Secchi; Ottorino Quaglierini; Enrico Garzelli; Cesare Milani	Germany; Alfred Rieck; Helmut Radach; Hans Kuschke; Heinz Kaufmann; Gerd Völs; Werner Loeckle; Hans-Joachim Hannemann; Herbert Schmidt; Wilhelm Mahlow

== Sailing ==
=== Medal table ===
* Host nation (Germany)

Rank	Nation	Gold	Silver	Bronze	Total
1	Germany*	1	1	1	3
2	Great Britain	1	0	1	2
2	Netherlands	1	0	1	2
4	Italy	1	0	0	1
5	Norway	0	2	0	2
6	Sweden	0	1	1	2
Totals (6 entries)		4	4	4	12

=== Medalists ===
Games	Gold	Silver	Bronze
O-Jolle	Daan Kagchelland; Netherlands	Werner Krogmann; Germany	Peter Scott; Great Britain
Star	Germany; Peter Bischoff; Hans-Joachim Weise	Sweden; Arvid Laurin; Uno Wallentin	Netherlands; Bob Maas; Willem de Vries Lentsch
6 metre	Great Britain; Christopher Boardman; Miles Bellville; Russell Harmer; Charles Leaf; Leonard Martin	Norway; Magnus Konow; Karsten Konow; Fredrik Meyer; Vaadjuv Nyqvist; Alf Tveten	Sweden; Sven Salén; Lennart Ekdahl; Martin Hindorff; Torsten Lord; Dagmar Salén
8 metre	Italy; Giovanni Reggio; Bruno Bianchi; Luigi De Manincor; Domenico Mordini; Enrico Poggi; Luigi Poggi	Norway; Olaf Ditlev-Simonsen; John Ditlev-Simonsen; Hans Struksnæs; Lauritz Schmidt; Jacob Thams; Nordahl Wallem	Germany; Hans Howaldt; Fritz Bischoff; Alfried Krupp von Bohlen und Halbach; Eduard Mohr; Felix Scheder-Bieschin; Otto Wachs

== Shooting ==
=== Medal table ===
* Host nation (Germany)

Rank	Nation	Gold	Silver	Bronze	Total
1	Germany*	1	2	0	3
2	Sweden	1	0	1	2
3	Norway	1	0	0	1
4	Hungary	0	1	0	1
5	France	0	0	1	1
5	Poland	0	0	1	1
Totals (6 entries)		3	3	3	9

=== Medalists ===
Event	Gold	Silver	Bronze
50 m pistol	Torsten Ullman; Sweden	Erich Krempel; Germany	Charles des Jammonières; France
25 m rapid fire pistol	Cornelius van Oyen; Germany	Heinz Hax; Germany	Torsten Ullman; Sweden
50 m rifle prone	Willy Røgeberg; Norway	Ralph Berzsenyi; Hungary	Władysław Karaś; Poland

== Swimming ==
=== Medal table ===
* Host nation (Germany)

Rank	Nation	Gold	Silver	Bronze	Total
1	Japan	4	2	5	11
2	Netherlands	4	1	0	5
3	United States	2	3	3	8
4	Hungary	1	0	1	2
5	Germany*	0	3	1	4
6	Denmark	0	1	1	2
7	Argentina	0	1	0	1
Totals (7 entries)		11	11	11	33

=== Men's events ===
Games	Gold	Silver	Bronze
100 m freestyle	Ferenc Csik; Hungary	Masanori Yusa; Japan	Shigeo Arai; Japan
400 m freestyle	Jack Medica; United States	Shunpei Uto; Japan	Shozo Makino; Japan
1500 m freestyle	Noboru Terada; Japan	Jack Medica; United States	Shunpei Uto; Japan
100 m backstroke	Adolph Kiefer; United States	Al Vande Weghe; United States	Masaji Kiyokawa; Japan
200 m breaststroke	Tetsuo Hamuro; Japan	Erwin Sietas; Germany	Reizo Koike; Japan
4 × 200 m freestyle relay	Japan; Shigeo Arai; Shigeo Sugiura; Masaharu Taguchi; Masanori Yusa	United States; Ralph Flanagan; John Macionis; Jack Medica; Paul Wolf	Hungary; Oszkár Abay-Nemes; Ferenc Csik; Ödön Gróf; Árpád Lengyel

=== Women's events ===
Games	Gold	Silver	Bronze
100 m freestyle	Rie Mastenbroek; Netherlands	Jeannette Campbell; Argentina	Gisela Arendt; Germany
400 m freestyle	Rie Mastenbroek; Netherlands	Ragnhild Hveger; Denmark	Lenore Wingard; United States
100 m backstroke	Nida Senff; Netherlands	Rie Mastenbroek; Netherlands	Alice Bridges; United States
200 m breaststroke	Hideko Maehata; Japan	Martha Genenger; Germany	Inge Sørensen; Denmark
4 × 100 m freestyle relay	Netherlands; Rie Mastenbroek; Willy den Ouden; Jopie Selbach; Tini Wagner	Germany; Gisela Arendt; Ruth Halbsguth; Leni Lohmar; Ingeborg Schmitz	United States; Mavis Freeman; Bernice Lapp; Olive McKean; Katherine Rawls

== Water polo ==
=== Medal table ===
Rank	Nation	Gold	Silver	Bronze	Total
1	Hungary	1	0	0	1
2	Germany	0	1	0	1
3	Belgium	0	0	1	1
Totals (3 entries)		1	1	1	3

=== Medalists ===
Event	Gold	Silver	Bronze
Men's	Hungary; Mihály Bozsi; Jenő Brandi; György Bródy; Olivér Halassy; Kálmán Hazai; Márton Homonnai; György Kutasi; István Molnár; János Németh; Miklós Sárkány; Sándor Tarics	Germany; Bernhard Baier; Fritz Gunst; Josef Hauser; Alfred Kienzle; Paul Klingenburg; Heinrich Krug; Hans Schneider; Hans Schulze; Gustav Schürger; Helmuth Schwenn; Fritz Stolze	Belgium; Gérard Blitz; Albert Castelyns; Pierre Coppieters; Joseph De Combe; Henri De Pauw; Henri Disy; Fernand Isselé; Edmond Michiels; Henri Stoelen

== Weightlifting ==
=== Medal table ===
* Host nation (Germany)

Rank	Nation	Gold	Silver	Bronze	Total
1	Egypt	2	1	2	5
2	Germany*	1	2	2	5
3	Austria	1	0	0	1
3	France	1	0	0	1
3	United States	1	0	0	1
6	Czechoslovakia	0	1	0	1
7	Estonia	0	0	1	1
Totals (7 entries)		6	4	5	15

=== Medalists ===
Games	Gold	Silver	Bronze
60 kg	Anthony Terlazzo; United States	Saleh Soliman; Egypt	Ibrahim Shams; Egypt
67.5 kg	Robert Fein; Austria	none awarded (as there was a tie for gold)	Karl Jansen; Germany
67.5 kg	Anwar Mesbah; Egypt	none awarded (as there was a tie for gold)	Karl Jansen; Germany
75 kg	Khadr El Touni; Egypt	Rudolf Ismayr; Germany	Adolf Wagner; Germany
82.5 kg	Louis Hostin; France	Eugen Deutsch; Germany	Ibrahim Wasif; Egypt
+82.5 kg	Josef Manger; Germany	Václav Pšenička; Czechoslovakia	Arnold Luhaäär; Estonia

== Wrestling ==
=== Medal table ===
* Host nation (Germany)

Rank	Nation	Gold	Silver	Bronze	Total
1	Sweden	4	3	2	9
2	Hungary	3	0	1	4
3	Finland	2	1	3	6
4	Estonia	2	1	2	5
5	United States	1	3	0	4
6	Turkey	1	0	1	2
7	France	1	0	0	1
8	Germany*	0	3	4	7
9	Czechoslovakia	0	2	0	2
10	Latvia	0	1	0	1
11	Canada	0	0	1	1
Totals (11 entries)		14	14	14	42

=== Freestyle ===
Games	Gold	Silver	Bronze
Bantamweight	Ödön Zombori; Hungary	Ross Flood; United States	Johannes Herbert; Germany
Featherweight	Kustaa Pihlajamäki; Finland	Francis Millard; United States	Gösta Frändfors; Sweden
Lightweight	Károly Kárpáti; Hungary	Wolfgang Ehrl; Germany	Hermanni Pihlajamäki; Finland
Welterweight	Frank Lewis; United States	Thure Andersson; Sweden	Joe Schleimer; Canada
Middleweight	Emile Poilvé; France	Richard Voliva; United States	Ahmet Kireççi; Turkey
Light Heavyweight	Knut Fridell; Sweden	August Neo; Estonia	Erich Siebert; Germany
Heavyweight	Kristjan Palusalu; Estonia	Josef Klapuch; Czechoslovakia	Hjalmar Nyström; Finland

=== Greco-Roman ===
Games	Gold	Silver	Bronze
Bantamweight	Márton Lõrincz; Hungary	Egon Svensson; Sweden	Jakob Brendel; Germany
Featherweight	Yaşar Erkan; Turkey	Aarne Reini; Finland	Einar Karlsson; Sweden
Lightweight	Lauri Koskela; Finland	Jozef Herda; Czechoslovakia	Voldemar Väli; Estonia
Welterweight	Rudolf Svedberg; Sweden	Fritz Schäfer; Germany	Eino Virtanen; Finland
Middleweight	Ivar Johansson; Sweden	Ludwig Schweickert; Germany	József Palotás; Hungary
Light Heavyweight	Axel Cadier; Sweden	Edvīns Bietags; Latvia	August Neo; Estonia
Heavyweight	Kristjan Palusalu; Estonia	John Nyman; Sweden	Kurt Hornfischer; Germany
