= India at the 1936 Summer Olympics =

- Flag of India
- IOC code: IND
- NOC: Indian Olympic Association

in Berlin
- Competitors: 27 in 4 sports
- Flag bearer: Dhyan Chand
- Medals Ranked 20th: Gold 1 Silver 0 Bronze 0 Total 1

Summer Olympics appearances (overview)
- 1900; 1904–1912; 1920; 1924; 1928; 1932; 1936; 1948; 1952; 1956; 1960; 1964; 1968; 1972; 1976; 1980; 1984; 1988; 1992; 1996; 2000; 2004; 2008; 2012; 2016; 2020; 2024

India competed at the 1936 Summer Olympics in Berlin, Germany. The Berlin Games marked India's 6th appearance at the Summer Olympics. India won a gold medal in field hockey and ranked 20th among the 32 NOCs that participated.

== Medalists ==
=== Gold ===
- Richard Allen, Dhyan Chand, Earnest Cullen, Ali Dara, Lionel Emmett, Peter Fernandes, Joseph Galibardy, Mohomed Hussain, Mohammed Jaffar, Ahmed Sher Khan, Ahsan Mohomed Khan, Mirza Masood, Cyril Michie, Baboo Nimal, Joseph Phillip, Shabban Shahab ud-Din, G.S. Garewal, Roop Singh, and Carlyle Tapsell — Field hockey.

== Athletics ==
Men's 100 metres

- Eric Whiteside

Men's 200 metres

- Eric Whiteside

Men's marathon

- C. S. A. Swami

== Field hockey ==
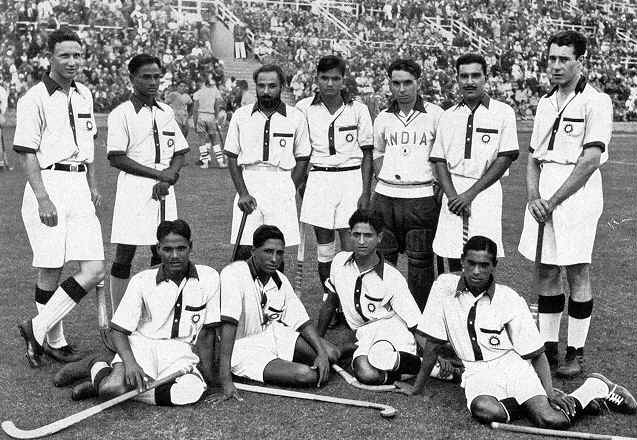
India's field hockey team, captained by hockey wizard Dhyan Chand (standing second from left) was the gold medal winner at the 1936 Berlin Summer Olympics

- Preliminary Round (Group A)

- Defeated Japan (9–0)
- Defeated Hungary (4–0)
- Defeated United States (7–0)

- Semi Finals

- Defeated France (10–0)

- Final

- Defeated Germany (8–1) → Gold

== Weightlifting ==
Athlete	Event	Total(Kgs)	Rank
Zaw Weik	Men's 75 kg	310.0	15

== Wrestling ==
Men's bantamweight

- Shankarrao Thorat AC

Men's welterweight

- Rashid Anwar AC

Men's middleweight

- Karam Rasul AC

== See also ==
- Indian sports at the 1936 Summer Olympics
