= Schmalix =

Schmalix is a surname. Notable people with the surname include:

- Heinz Schmalix (1910–1975), German field hockey player
- Hubert Schmalix (1952–2025), Austrian painter
