= Babaci =

Babaci is a surname. Notable people with the surname include:

- Lahcen Babaci (born 1957), Algerian middle-distance runner
- Sayed Ali Babaci (born 1915), Afghan field hockey player
