= Annen (surname) =

Annen is a German surname. Notable people with the surname include:

- Blake Annen (born 1991), American football player
- Martin Annen (born 1974), Swiss bobsledder
- Niels Annen (born 1973), German politician
- Roland Annen (1916–2005), Swiss field hockey player
