= Hufschmid =

Hufschmid may refer to:

- Eric Hufschmid, American author of the 2002 book Painful Questions: An Analysis of the September 11th Attack.
- Ernst Hufschmid (handballer) (1910–?), Swiss field handball player
- Willy Hufschmid (born 1918), Swiss field handball player
- Patrick Hufschmid (born 1976), luthier - Hufschmid Guitars Switzerland
- Ernst Hufschmid (footballer) (1913–2002), Swiss footballer
