= Hockey at the 1936 Olympics =

Hockey at the 1936 Olympics may refer to:

- Ice hockey at the 1936 Winter Olympics
- Field hockey at the 1936 Summer Olympics
