= Bácskai =

Bácskai [ˈbaːtʃkɒi] or Bácskay is a Hungarian habitational surname originally used for a person stemming from the historical region of Bačka (Hungarian: Bácska), which today is divided between Serbia and Hungary. It may refer to:

== Bácskai/Bacskai ==
- Béla Bácskai (1912–1994), Hungarian field hockey player
- Györgyi Bácskai (born 1946), Hungarian sport parachutist and parachute instructor
- Imre Bacskai (born 1988), Hungarian boxer
- István Bácskai (1908–1996), Hungarian esperantist, editor and lawyer
- István Bácskai Lauró (1933–2020), Hungarian film director
- János Bácskai (born 1962), Hungarian politician
- János Bácskai (actor) (born 1954), Hungarian actor
- Mária Bácskai (born 1938), Hungarian sprinter
- Sára Bácskai (born 1999), Hungarian short track speed skater
- Zsolt Bácskai (born 1975), Hungarian long-distance runner

== Bácskay/Bacskay ==
- Julcsa Bácskay (1861–1938), Hungarian soprano singer
- László Bacskay (1943–2006), Hungarian footballer
