= Cseri =

Cseri is a Hungarian surname. Notable people with the name include:

- Gergő Cseri (born 1982), Hungarian footballer
- László Cseri (1912–1998), Hungarian field hockey player
- Tamás Cseri (born 1988), Hungarian footballer
