= Westerkamp (name) =

Westerkamp or Westercamp is a surname. Notable people with the surname include:

- Hildegard Westerkamp, Canadian composer
- Jordan Westerkamp, American football player
- Kara Westercamp, American lawyer
- Max Westerkamp, Dutch field hockey player
