= Schnitger =

Schnitger is a surname. Notable people with the surname include:

- Arp Schnitger (1648–1719), German pipe organ builder
- Hans Schnitger (1915–2013), Dutch field hockey player
- Lara Schnitger (born 1969), Dutch-American sculptor

== See also ==
- 29203 Schnitger, a main-belt asteroid
- Schnitger organ (Hamburg)
