= Szamosi =

Szamosi is a Hungarian surname. Notable people with the surname include:

- Ferenc Szamosi (1915–1968), Hungarian ice hockey and field hockey player
- Tamás Szamosi (born 1974), Hungarian footballer
- Zsófia Szamosi (born 1977), Hungarian actress
