= Gilliéron =

Gilliéron is a French surname. Notable people with this name include:

- Émile Gilliéron (1850–1924), Swiss artist and archaeological draftsman
- Émile Gilliéron fils (1885–1939), son of Gilliéron père, also an artist
- Jules Gilliéron (1854–1926), Swiss-French linguist and dialectologist
- Lauriane Gilliéron (born 1984), Swiss actress, model and beauty queen
- Louis Gilliéron (1909–?), Swiss field hockey player
- Peter Gilliéron (born 1953), Swiss lawyer and football official
