= Johannes Jensen =

Johannes Jensen may refer to:

- Johannes V. Jensen (1873–1950), Danish author
- J. Hans D. Jensen (1907–1973), German nuclear physicist
- Johannes Jensen (aviator) (1898–1978), German World War I flying ace
- Johannes Robert Jensen (1916–1984), Danish field hockey player
