= Paul Sartorius =

Paul Sartorius may refer to:

- Paul Sartorius (field hockey)
- Paul Sartorius (composer)
