= Daiji =

Daiji may refer to:

- Daiji (era), Japanese era name
- Daiji, a set of kanji for numerals used in legal and financial documents to prevent forgeries
- Daiji, Iran, a village in Khuzestan Province, Iran
- Daiji, Nepal, a village development committee in Kanchanpur District, Nepal

== People with the given name ==
- Daiji Morii (born 1967), Japanese tennis player
- Daiji Takahashi (born 1977), Japanese mixed martial artist
- Daiji Yamada (山田 大治, born 1981), Japanese basketball player
- Daiji Kurauchi (1913), Japanese field hockey player
