= Frank Cavanaugh =

Frank Cavana(u)gh or Kavanagh may refer to:

- Frank Cavanagh (born 1970), former bass player for Filter
- Frank Cavanaugh (American football) (1876–1933), American football player and coach
- Frank Kavanaugh, participated in Field hockey at the 1936 Summer Olympics – Men's team squads
