= Van der Haar =

van der Haar or Vander Haar is a surname. Notable people with the surname include:

- Albert van der Haar (born 1975), Dutch footballer
- Paul Vander Haar (born 1958), Australian rules footballer
- Ru van der Haar (1913–1943), Dutch field hockey player
