= Tuscher =

Tuscher or Tüscher is a surname. Notable people with the surname include:

- Carl Marcus Tuscher (1705–1751), German-born Danish polymath
- Ernst Tüscher (1911–1964), Swiss field hockey player
- Mathéo Tuscher (born 1996), Swiss-French racing driver
