= Lanphear =

Lanphear is both a surname and a given name. Notable people with the name include:

- Dan Lanphear (1938–2018), American football player
- Kate Lanphear, American magazine editor
- Lanphear Buck (1901–1974), American field hockey player
