= Ernst Hufschmid =

Ernst Hufschmid may refer to:

- Ernst Hufschmid (handballer) (1910–?), Swiss field handball player
- Ernst Hufschmid (footballer) (1913–2001), Swiss footballer
