= Zoltán Berkes =

Zoltán Berkes may refer to:

- Zoltán Berkes (canoeist), Hungarian sprint canoer
- Zoltán Berkes (field hockey) (1916–1996), Hungarian field hockey player
