= Charles Imbault =

French field hockey player

Charles Marie Imbault (19 February 1909 – 11 February 1996) was a French field hockey player who competed in the 1936 Summer Olympics.

He is the twin brother of Paul Imbault.

He was a member of the French field hockey team, which finished fourth in the 1936 Olympic tournament. He played one match as forward.
