= Mogens Thomassen =

Danish field hockey player

Mogens Vilhelm Thomassen (September 24, 1914 – April 29, 1987) was a Danish field hockey player who competed in the 1936 Summer Olympics.

He was born in Hellerup, Gentofte.

In 1936 he was a member of the Danish team which was eliminated in the group stage of the Olympic tournament. He played both matches as halfback.
