= Emmanuel Gonat =

French field hockey player

Emmanuel Gonat (May 30, 1919 – November 21, 1979) was a French field hockey player who competed in the 1936 Summer Olympics.

He was a member of the French field hockey team, which finished fourth in the 1936 Olympic tournament. He played two matches as a forward.
