= Walther Meier =

Swiss field hockey player

Walther Meier (28 August 1910 – March 1991) was a Swiss field hockey player who competed in the 1936 Summer Olympics. In 1936 he was a member of the Swiss team which was eliminated in the group stage of the Olympic tournament. He played all three matches as halfback or forward.
