= Roger Toffel =

Swiss field hockey player

Roger Toffel (October 8, 1909 – July 1, 1969) was a Swiss field hockey player who competed in the 1936 Summer Olympics.

In 1936 he was a member of the Swiss team which was eliminated in the group stage of the Olympic tournament. He played all three matches as forward.
