= Carl Günther Weiss =

Danish field hockey player

Carl Günther Hermann Weiss (April 29, 1915 – April 2, 2000) was a Danish field hockey player who competed in the 1936 Summer Olympics. He was born in Gentofte.

In 1936 he was a member of the Danish team which was eliminated in the group stage of the Olympic tournament. He played both matches as goalkeeper.
