= Henry Kristian Larsen =

Danish field hockey player

Henry Kristian Larsen (May 16, 1914 – August 14, 1986) was a Danish field hockey player who competed in the 1936 Summer Olympics.

He was born in Vig, Trundholm, Zealand and died in Kalundborg.

In 1936 he was a member of the Danish team which was eliminated in the group stage of the Olympic tournament. He played one match as halfback.
