= Paul Fentress =

American field hockey player

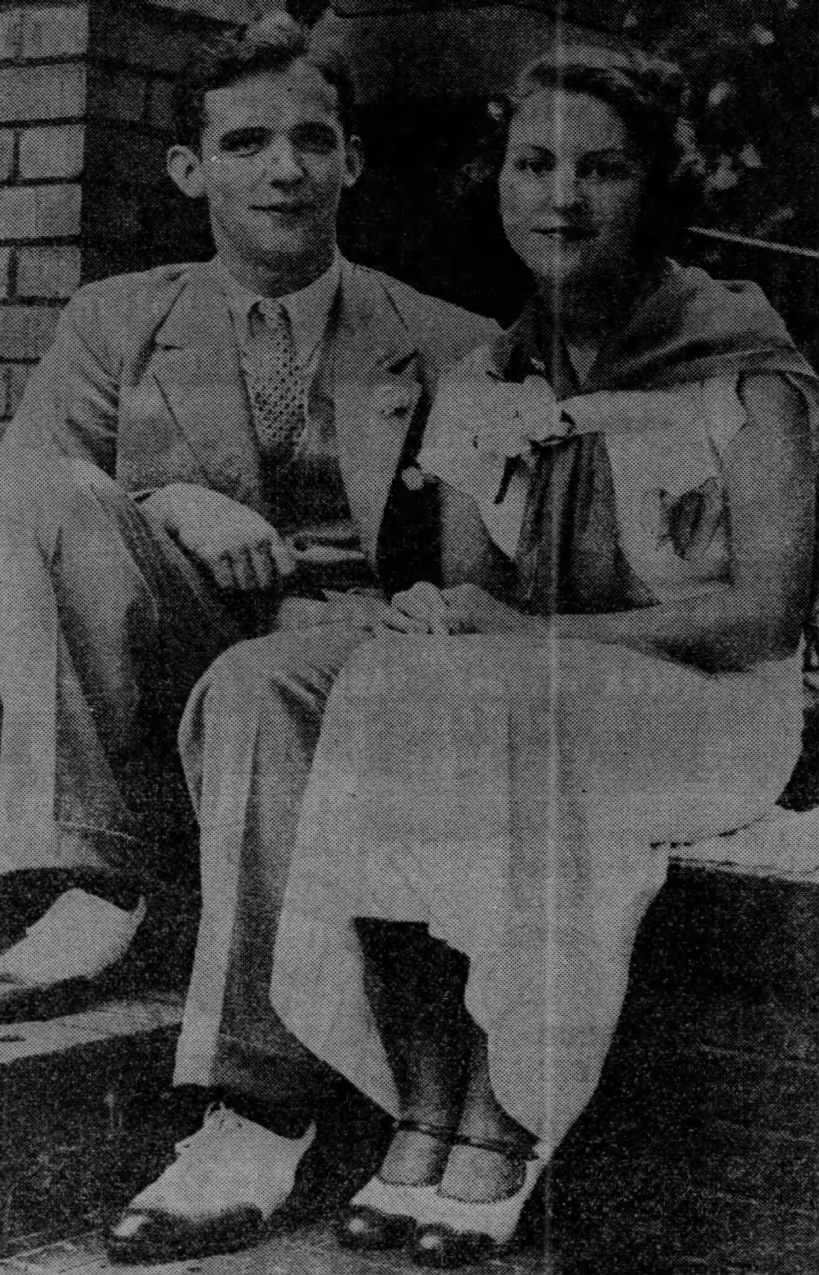
- Fentress (left) with Roslyn Paine, 1935

Personal information
- Full name: Paul Lyon Fentress
- Born: November 13, 1913 Hubbard Woods, Illinois, U.S.
- Died: December 12, 1983 (aged 70) Palm Beach, Florida, U.S.

Sport
- Sport: Field hockey
- Position: Goalkeeper

Paul Lyon Fentress (November 13, 1913 – December 12, 1983) was an American field hockey player.

== Life and career ==
Fentress was born in Hubbard Woods, Illinois, the son of Calvin Fentress and Paulina Lyon. He attended Princeton University, graduating in 1936.

Fentress competed at the 1936 Summer Olympics, finishing in 10th place in the men's field hockey event. After competing in the Olympics, he worked as an investor and a rancher in Florida.

== Death ==
Fentress died on December 12, 1983, in Palm Beach, Florida, at the age of 70.
