= Vagn Hovard =

Danish field hockey player

Vagn Eichner Hovard (14 July 1914 – 6 September 1998) was a Danish field hockey player who competed in the 1936 Summer Olympics and in the 1948 Summer Olympics. He was born in Frederiksberg.

In 1936 he was a member of the Danish team which was eliminated in the group stage of the Olympic tournament. He played one match as halfback. Twelve years later he was eliminated with the Danish team in the first round of the 1948 Olympic tournament. He played one match as halfback.
