= Paul Imbault =

French field hockey player

Paul Marie Imbault (19 February 1909 – 17 May 1941) was a French field hockey player who competed in the 1928 Summer Olympics and in the 1936 Summer Olympics. He is the twin brother of Charles Imbault. In 1928 he was a squad member of the French team but did not play a match in the Olympic tournament. Eight years later he was a member of the French field hockey team, which finished fourth in the 1936 Olympic tournament. He played four matches as back.
