= Charles Légeret =

Swiss field hockey player

Charles Légeret (19 August 1909 – 12 July 1983) was a Swiss field hockey player who competed in the 1936 Summer Olympics.

In 1936 he was a member of the Swiss team which was eliminated in the group stage of the Olympic tournament. He played all three matches as back.
