= Willy Hagenaers =

Belgian hockey player (born 1914)

Personal information
- Nationality: Belgian
- Born: 6 May 1914 Antwerp, Belgium

Sport
- Sport: Field hockey

Willy Hagenaers (born 6 May 1914, date of death unknown) was a Belgian field hockey player. He competed in the men's tournament at the 1936 Summer Olympics.
