= Noboru Tanaka (field hockey) =

Japanese field hockey player

Personal information
- Nationality: Japanese
- Born: 1912

Sport
- Sport: Field hockey

Noboru Tanaka (田中 昇, Tanaka Noboru; born 1912) was a Japanese field hockey player. He competed in the men's tournament at the 1936 Summer Olympics.
