= Dénes Birkás =

Hungarian field hockey player (1907–1996)

Dénes Birkás, also known as Deján Bikár (13 March 1907 – 10 July 1996), was a Hungarian field hockey and ice hockey player who competed in the 1936 Summer Olympics.

He was born in Budapest.

He played at the 1930 and 1931 ice hockey World Championships. He would later coach the Hungarian national ice hockey team in 1959–1960.

In 1936 he was a member of the Hungarian team which was eliminated in the group stage of the Olympic tournament. He played all three matches as halfback.
