= Claude Roques =

French field hockey player

Claude Alexandre Roques (16 September 1912 – 19 November 2003) was a French field hockey player who competed in the 1936 Summer Olympics.

He was a member of the French field hockey team, which finish fourth in the 1936 Olympic tournament. He played two matches as forward.
