= Reggy Van De Putte =

Belgian field hockey player (born 1915)

Personal information
- Nationality: Belgian
- Born: 14 July 1915 Liverpool, England
- Died: 22 November 1980 (aged 65)

Sport
- Sport: Field hockey

Reggy Van De Putte (14 July 1915 – 22 November 1980) was a British-born Belgian field hockey player. He competed in the men's tournament at the 1936 Summer Olympics.
