= Tage Schultz =

Danish field hockey player

Tage Schultz (16 June 1916 – 2 February 1983) was a Danish field hockey player who competed in the 1936 Summer Olympics.

He was born and died in Copenhagen.

In 1936 he was a squad member of the Danish team which was eliminated in the group stage of the Olympic tournament. He played one match in the consolation round.
