= Giancarlo Luzzani =

Swiss field hockey player

Giancarlo Luzzani (12 May 1912 – 3 November 1991) was a Swiss field hockey player who competed in the 1936 Summer Olympics. In 1936 he was a member of the Swiss team which was eliminated in the group stage of the Olympic tournament. He played one match as halfback.
