= Róbert Lifkai =

Hungarian field hockey player

Róbert Lifkai (also known as Lifka, 20 July 1916 – 10 April 1969) was a Hungarian field hockey player who competed in the 1936 Summer Olympics. In 1936 he was a member of the Hungarian team which was eliminated in the group stage of the Olympic tournament. He played one match as back.
