= Osamu Takechi =

Japanese hockey player (born 1914)

Personal information
- Nationality: Japanese
- Born: 1914

Sport
- Sport: Field hockey

Osamu Takechi (born 1914, date of death unknown) was a Japanese field hockey player. He competed in the men's tournament at the 1936 Summer Olympics.
