= Edmond Leplat =

Belgian field hockey player

Personal information
- Nationality: Belgian
- Born: 8 February 1911

Sport
- Sport: Field hockey

Edmond Leplat (born 8 February 1911) was a Belgian field hockey player. He competed in the men's tournament at the 1936 Summer Olympics.
