= Raymond Tixier =

French field hockey player

Personal information
- Full name: Raymond Noel Tixier
- Nationality: French
- Born: 25 December 1912 Paris, France
- Died: 10 May 1940 (aged 27) Padoux, France

Sport
- Sport: Field hockey

Raymond Noel Tixier (25 December 1912 – 10 May 1940) was a French field hockey player. He competed in the men's tournament at the 1936 Summer Olympics. He was killed during the Second World War.

== Personal life ==
Tixier served as a second lieutenant in the French Air Force during the Second World War. He was killed in action on 10 May 1940 during the Battle of France.

== External links and other languages on Wikipedia ==
- Raymond Tixier at Olympedia
- Raymond Noël TIxier at Wikipédia (French version)
