= Vagn Loft =

Danish field hockey player (1915–1976)

Vagn Loft (24 September 1915 – 10 May 1976) was a Danish field hockey player who competed in the 1936 Summer Olympics and in the 1948 Summer Olympics.

== Biography ==
Loft was born in Copenhagen and died in Stengård, Gladsaxe.

In 1936 he was a squad member of the Danish team which was eliminated in the group stage of the Olympic tournament. He played one match in the consolation round.

Twelve years later he was eliminated with the Danish team in the first round of the 1948 Olympic tournament. He played two matches as forward.
