= Zoltán Turcsányi =

Hungarian field hockey player (1914–2002)

Zoltán Turcsányi (7 November 1914 – 16 April 2002) was a Hungarian field hockey player who competed in the 1936 Summer Olympics.

He was born in Rábapatona, Győr-Moson-Sopron County.

In 1936, he was a member of the Hungarian team which was eliminated in the group stage of the Olympic tournament. He played two matches as halfback and forward.
