= György Margó =

Hungarian field hockey player

György Margó (15 May 1912 – 9 November 1988) was a Hungarian field hockey and ice hockey player who competed in the 1936 Summer Olympics. He was born and died in Budapest.

In 1936 he was a member of the Hungarian team which was eliminated in the group stage of the Olympic tournament. He played two matches as forward.
