= Claude Gravereaux =

French field hockey player

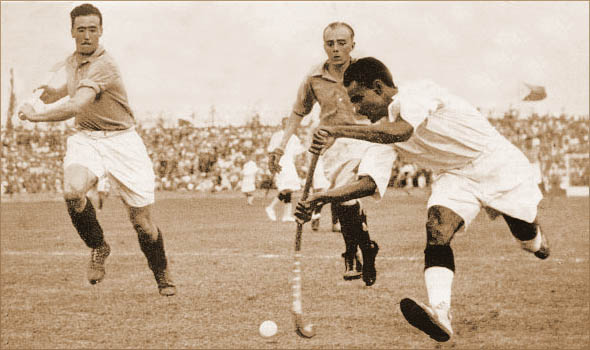
- 1936 Olympics Field Hockey Semi-finals -- India vs. France 12 August 1936. Claude is center in this image.

Personal information
- Born: 2 May 1913
- Died: 21 November 1943 (aged 30) New York City, New York, U.S.

Sport
- Sport: Field hockey

Claude Gravereaux (2 May 1913 – 21 November 1943) was a French field hockey player who competed in the 1936 Summer Olympics.

He was a member of the French field hockey team, which finish fourth in the 1936 Olympic tournament. He played three matches as halfback.

== Personal life ==
At the outbreak of the Second World War in 1939, Gravereaux volunteered for the French Army. While serving as a corporal in a machine-gun squad, he was wounded in the jaw and captured at Namur during the Battle of France in 1940, but escaped and enlisted in the Free French Army. For actions during the invasion of France, Gravereaux received the Croix de guerre and Médaille militaire. While serving with the Free French forces, he took part in Operation Torch; however, he suffered a relapse of his wound and travelled to New York City, where he died in November 1943.
