= Sadao Wakizaka =

Japanese field hockey player

Personal information
- Nationality: Japanese
- Born: 1916
- Died: 19 April 1945 (aged 28–29)

Sport
- Sport: Field hockey

Sadao Wakizaka (1916 – 19 April 1945) was a Japanese field hockey player. He competed in the men's tournament at the 1936 Summer Olympics. He died during World War II.
