= Ferenc Miklós =

Hungarian field hockey player

Ferenc Miklós (7 August 1909 – October 2002) was a Hungarian field hockey player who competed in the 1936 Summer Olympics.

In 1936 he was a member of the Hungarian team which was eliminated in the group stage of the Olympic tournament. He played all three matches as halfback.
