= Makoto Kikuchi =

Japanese field hockey player

Personal information
- Nationality: Japanese
- Born: 1911

Sport
- Sport: Field hockey

Makoto Kikuchi (born 1911, date of death unknown) was a Japanese field hockey player. He competed in the men's tournament at the 1936 Summer Olympics.
