= Gusztáv Lifkai =

Hungarian field hockey player

Gusztáv Lifkai (also known as Lifka; 11 June 1912 – ?) was a Hungarian field hockey player who competed in the 1936 Summer Olympics.

In 1936 he was a member of the Hungarian team, which was eliminated in the group stage of the Olympic tournament. He played all three matches as back.
