= Jørgen Gry =

Danish field hockey player (1915–1993)

Jørgen Gry (19 May 1915 – 18 July 1993) was a Danish field hockey player who competed in the 1936 Summer Olympics.

He was born in Copenhagen and died in Egebæksvang, Helsingør.

In 1936 he was a squad member of the Danish team which was eliminated in the group stage of the Olympic tournament. He played one match in the consolation round.
