= Emmanuel Van De Merghel =

Belgian field hockey player

Personal information
- Nationality: Belgian
- Born: 15 November 1908 Brussels, Belgium
- Died: 19 January 1972 (aged 63)

Sport
- Sport: Field hockey

Emmanuel Van De Merghel (15 November 1908 – 19 January 1972) was a Belgian field hockey player. He competed in the men's tournament at the 1936 Summer Olympics.
