= Guy Chevalier =

French field hockey player

Guy Camille James Chevalier (5 December 1910 – 27 October 1965) was a French field hockey player who competed in the 1928 Summer Olympics, in the 1936 Summer Olympics and in the 1948 Summer Olympics.

He was born in Sens.

In 1928 he was part of the French field hockey team which was eliminated in the groups stage of the 1928 Olympic tournament. He played all three matches as back.

Eight years later he was a member of the French field hockey team, which finished fourth in the 1936 Olympic tournament. He played four matches as back.

At the 1948 Olympics he was eliminated in the groups stage of the Olympic tournament with French team. He played two matches as back.
