= Jørgen Robert Hansen =

Danish field hockey player (1911–1991)

Jørgen Robert Viggo Hansen (23 March 1911 – 6 August 1991) was a Danish field hockey player who competed in the 1936 Summer Olympics and in the 1948 Summer Olympics.

He was born and died in Kalundborg.

In 1936 he was a member of the Danish team which was eliminated in the group stage of the Olympic tournament. He played both matches as back.

Twelve years later he was eliminated with the Danish team in the first round of the 1948 Olympic tournament. He played all four matches as back.
