= Takehiko Yanagi =

Japanese field hockey player (born 1916)

Personal information
- Nationality: Japanese
- Born: 28 March 1916

Sport
- Sport: Field hockey

Takehiko Yanagi (born 28 March 1916, date of death unknown) was a Japanese field hockey player. He competed in the men's tournament at the 1936 Summer Olympics. Yanagi is deceased.
