= François Verger =

French field hockey player

François Verger (29 November 1911 – 24 October 2001) was a French field hockey player who competed in the 1936 Summer Olympics. He was a member of the French field hockey team, which finish fourth in the 1936 Olympic tournament. He played four matches as halfback.
