= Albert Van Den Branden =

Belgian field hockey player

Albert Georges Théodore Van Den Branden
Personal information
- Nationality: Belgian
- Born: 23 March 1910 Brussels, Belgium

Sport
- Sport: Field hockey

Albert Van Den Branden (born 23 March 1910, date of death unknown) was a Belgian field hockey player. He competed in the men's tournament at the 1936 Summer Olympics.
