= Étienne Guibel =

French field hockey player

Étienne Henri Clement Joseph Guibel (7 August 1905 – 2 February 1989) was a French field hockey player who competed in the 1936 Summer Olympics.

He was a member of the French field hockey team, which finish fourth in the 1936 Olympic tournament. He played one match as goalkeeper.
