= Anatole Vologe =

French field hockey player

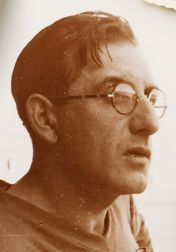
Anatole Vologe

Anatole "Tola" Vologe (25 May 1909 in Vilnius – 24 May 1944 in Lyon) was a French field hockey player who competed in the 1936 Summer Olympics. He was a member of the French field hockey team, which finish fourth in the 1936 Olympic tournament. He played all five matches as forward.

He was born in Vilnius, Lithuania (but then in the Russian Empire) in 1909.

He was executed during World War II at Lyon, allegedly for attempting escape after being arrested by Milice and imprisoned by the Germans.
