= Raymond Distave =

Belgian field hockey player (1913–1993)

Personal information
- Nationality: Belgian
- Born: 12 November 1913 Liège, Belgium
- Died: 2 November 1993 (aged 79) Ghent, Belgium

Sport
- Sport: Field hockey

Raymond Distave (12 November 1913 – 2 November 1993) was a Belgian field hockey player. He competed in the men's tournament at the 1936 Summer Olympics.

Distave died in Ghent on 2 November 1993, at the age of 79.
