= Michihiro Ito =

Japanese field hockey player (born 1915)

Personal information
- Nationality: Japanese
- Born: 20 March 1915

Sport
- Sport: Field hockey

Michihiro Ito (born 20 March 1915, date of death unknown) was a Japanese field hockey player. He competed in the men's tournament at the 1936 Summer Olympics.
