= Édouard Portielje =

Belgian field hockey player

Personal information
- Nationality: Belgian
- Born: 15 October 1914

Sport
- Sport: Field hockey

Édouard Portielje (born 15 October 1914, date of death unknown) was a Belgian field hockey player. He competed in the men's tournament at the 1936 Summer Olympics.
