= Eugène Moreau de Melen =

Belgian field hockey player

Personal information
- Nationality: Belgian
- Born: 6 August 1912 Forest, Belgium
- Died: 1996 (aged 83–84)

Sport
- Sport: Field hockey

Eugène Moreau de Melen (6 August 1912 – 1996) was a Belgian field hockey player. He competed in the men's tournament at the 1936 Summer Olympics.
