= Ferenc Szamosi =

Hungarian field hockey player

- Born: 15 February 1915 Budapest, Hungary
- Died: 14 July 1968 (aged 53)
- Position: Centre
- Played for: BBTE Budapest; EHC Arosa; MTK Budapest; Postás Budapest; Újpesti Dózsa SC
- National team: Hungary
- Playing career: 1931–1958

Ferenc Szamosi (né Sztoics; 15 February 1915 – 14 July 1968) was a Hungarian ice hockey and field hockey player who competed at the 1936 Winter Olympics and at the 1936 Summer Olympics.

In 1936 he was part of the Hungarian ice hockey team which was eliminated in the second round of the Olympic tournament. He played all six matches.

At the 1936 Summer Games he was a member of the Hungarian field hockey team which was eliminated in the group stage of the Olympic tournament. He played two matches as halfback and back.
