= Hermann auf der Heide =

German field hockey player

Olympic medal record

Men's field hockey
Silver medal – second place	1936 Berlin	Team competition

Hermann auf der Heide (1 June 1911 in Frankfurt - 17 October 1984 in Bonn) was a German field hockey player who competed in the 1936 Summer Olympics held in Berlin, Nazi Germany.

He played one match as back for the German field hockey team, which won the silver medal.
