= Jacques Rensburg (field hockey) =

Belgian field hockey player

Personal information
- Nationality: Belgian
- Born: 8 June 1903

Sport
- Sport: Field hockey

Jacques Rensburg (born 8 June 1903, date of death unknown) was a Belgian field hockey player. He competed in the men's tournament at the 1936 Summer Olympics.
