= Béla Háray =

Hungarian field hockey player

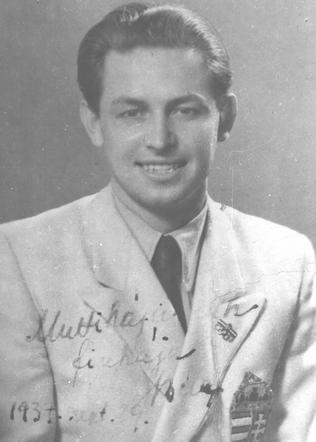
- Háray in 1936
- Born: 25 March 1915; Budapest, Hungary
- Died: 9 March 1988 (aged 72); Budapest, Hungary
Ice hockey career
- Position: Right winger
- Played for: BBTE Budapest (1933-1944); Ferencvárosi TC (1945-1949); ÉDOSZ Budapest (1949-1950); Budapesti Kinizsi (1950- 1953); Postás Budapest (1953-1955); Budapesti Vasutas SC (1955-1958)
- Coached for: Törekvés Budapest (1955-1956); Budapesti Vasutas SC (1956-1968)
- National team: Hungary
- Field hockey career
- Sport: Field hockey
- Position: Forward
National team
Years	Team	Caps	Goals
1936	Hungary	3	(2)

Béla Háray (25 March 1915 – 9 March 1988) was a Hungarian ice hockey and field hockey player who competed in the 1936 Winter Olympics and in the 1936 Summer Olympics.

== Biography ==
In 1936 he was part of the Hungarian ice hockey team which was eliminated in the second round of the Olympic tournament. He played five matches and scored four goals. At the 1936 Summer Games he was a member of the Hungarian field hockey team which was eliminated in the group stage of the Olympic tournament. He played all three matches as forward and scored two goals.

He was born and died in Budapest, Hungary.
