= Joseph Goubert =

French field hockey player

Personal information
- Full name: Joseph Antoine Guy Berchon de Fontaine Goubert
- Nationality: French
- Born: 25 November 1908 Pondicherry, French India
- Died: unknown

Sport
- Sport: Field hockey
- Club: Stade français, Paris

Joseph Goubert (born 25 November 1908, date of death unknown) was a French field hockey player. He competed in the 1936 Summer Olympics.

== Career ==
Goubert was a member of the French field hockey team, which finish fourth in the 1936 Olympic tournament. He played all five matches as forward.
