= Claude Soulé =

French field hockey player

Claude Soulé (14 November 1911 – 13 December 1969) was a French field hockey player who competed in the 1936 Summer Olympics. He was a member of the French field hockey team, which finish fourth in the 1936 Olympic tournament. He played all five matches as forward.
