= Béla Bácskai =

Hungarian field hockey player (1912–1994)

Béla Bácskai (25 April 1912 – 25 August 1994), also known as Béla Bogschütz, was a Hungarian field hockey player who competed in the 1936 Summer Olympics.

In 1936 he was a member of the Hungarian team which was eliminated in the group stage of the Olympic tournament. He played one match as back.
