= Johannes Robert Jensen =

Danish field hockey player (1916–1984)

Johannes Robert Jensen (2 February 1916 – 2 August 1984) was a Danish field hockey player who competed in the 1936 Summer Olympics and in the 1948 Summer Olympics.

== Biography ==
Jensen was born in Kalundborg and died in Hvidovre.

In 1936 he was a member of the Danish team which was eliminated in the group stage of the Olympic tournament. He played both matches as forward.

Twelve years later he was eliminated with the Danish team in the first round of the 1948 Olympic tournament. He played all four matches as forward.
