= Gyula Kormos =

Hungarian field hockey player

Gyula Kormos (also known as Konorót, 27 December 1911 – 18 October 1980) was a Hungarian field hockey player who competed in the 1936 Summer Olympics.

He was born and died in Budapest.

In 1936 he was a member of the Hungarian team which was eliminated in the group stage of the Olympic tournament. He played two matches as halfback.
