= Ernst Tüscher =

Swiss field hockey player

Ernst Tüscher (August 3, 1911 – February 2, 1964) was a Swiss field hockey player who competed in the 1936 Summer Olympics. In 1936 he was a member of the Swiss team which was eliminated in the group stage of the Olympic tournament. He played all three matches as goalkeeper.
