= René Courvoisier =

Swiss field hockey player

René Courvoisier (June 9, 1907 – January 2, 1989) was a Swiss field hockey player who competed in the 1936 Summer Olympics. In 1936 he was a member of the Swiss team which was eliminated in the group stage of the Olympic tournament. He played two matches as forward.
