= Otto Busch =

Danish field hockey player (1904–1983)

Jens Otto Busch (16 August 1904 – 13 January 1983) was a Danish field hockey player who competed in the 1928 Summer Olympics, in the 1936 Summer Olympics and in the 1948 Summer Olympics.

He was born in Copenhagen and died in Fårevejle, Sjælland.

In 1928 he was a member of the Danish team which was eliminated in the first round of the Olympic tournament after two wins and two losses. He played all four matches as a forward.

Eight years later he was eliminated with the Danish team in the first round of the 1936 Olympic tournament. He played both matches.

His last Olympic appearance was in 1948 when he was eliminated with the Danish team in the first round of the Olympic tournament. He played one match.
