= Jean Rouget =

French field hockey player

Jean Marcel Paul Rouget (7 November 1916 – 7 December 1998) was a French field hockey player who competed in the 1936 Summer Olympics and in the 1948 Summer Olympics.

In 1936, he was a member of the French field hockey team, which finished fourth in the 1936 Olympic tournament. He played one match as forward.

Twelve years later, he was part of the French field hockey team which was eliminated in the group stage of the 1948 Olympic tournament. He played one match as forward.
