= Daiji Kurauchi =

Japanese field hockey player

Personal information
- Nationality: Japanese
- Born: 1913

Sport
- Sport: Field hockey

Daiji Kurauchi (1913 — unknown) was a Japanese field hockey player. He competed in the men's tournament at the 1936 Summer Olympics.
