= Tamás Márffy =

Hungarian field hockey player

Tamás von Márffy-Mantuano (20 March 1907 – 21 March 1969) was a Hungarian field hockey player who competed in the 1936 Summer Olympics.

He was born in Rome, Italy and died in London, England.

In 1936, he was a member of the Hungarian team which was eliminated in the group stage of the Olympic tournament. He played two matches as forward.
