= Lanphear Buck =

American field hockey player

Lanphear Buck (born December 9, 1901, Fall River, Massachusetts; died May 18, 1974, Port Chester, New York) was an American field hockey player who competed in the 1936 Summer Olympics.

He was born in Fall River, Massachusetts to Augustus Walker Buck and Jennie Hurd (Lanphear) Buck. On September 16, 1937 he married Arizona-born Louise McArthur in Philadelphia, Pennsylvania.

In 1936 he was a member of the American team which was eliminated in the group stage of the Olympic tournament. He played one match as forward.

Back later became a real estate management executive.
