= Walter Scherrer =

Swiss field hockey player (1908–1985)

Walter Scherrer (3 December 1908 – December 1985) was a Swiss field hockey player who competed in the 1936 Summer Olympics. In 1936, he was a member of the Swiss team which was eliminated in the group stage of the Olympic tournament. He played all three matches as halfback.
