= Zoltán Berkes (field hockey) =

Hungarian field hockey player (1916–1996)

Zoltán Berkes (1 October 1916 – 16 April 1996) was a Hungarian field hockey player who competed in the 1936 Summer Olympics.

In 1936 he was a member of the Hungarian team which was eliminated in the group stage of the Olympic tournament. He played one match as forward.
