= Takeo Ito (field hockey) =

Japanese field hockey player (born 1915)

Takeo Ito (伊藤 赳夫, Itō Takeo) (born 5 January 1915, date of death unknown) was a Japanese field hockey player who competed in the 1936 Summer Olympics.

In the 1936 tournament he played all three matches as forward for the Japanese field hockey team, when they were eliminated after the group stage.
