= Adolf Fehr (field hockey) =

Swiss field hockey player

Adolf Maximilian Fehr (April 7, 1904 – May 11, 1992) was a Swiss field hockey player who competed in the 1928 Summer Olympics and in the 1936 Summer Olympics. In 1928 he was part of the Swiss team which was eliminated in the group stage of the Olympic tournament. He played all four matches as halfback or forward. Eight years later he was a member of the Swiss team which was eliminated in the group stage of the 1936 Olympic tournament. He played all three matches as halfback or forward.
