= Henri Delaval =

Belgian field hockey player (born 1913)

Personal information
- Full name: Henri Joseph Lambert Delaval
- Nationality: Belgian
- Born: 1 November 1913 Brussels, Belgium

Sport
- Sport: Field hockey

Henri Joseph Lambert Delaval (born 1 November 1913, date of death unknown) was a Belgian field hockey player. He competed at the 1936 Summer Olympics and the 1948 Summer Olympics.
