= Alfred Gerdes =

German field hockey player

Olympic medal record

Men's field hockey
Silver medal – second place	1936 Berlin	Team competition

Alfred Gerdes (24 October 1916, Berlin – 15 July 2006, Konstanz) was a German field hockey player who competed in the 1936 Summer Olympics. He was a member of the German field hockey team, which won the silver medal. He played three matches as halfback.
