= Sayed Ali Babaci =

Afghan field hockey player (born 1915)

Sayed Ali Babaci (born 12 March 1915, date of death unknown) was an Afghan field hockey player, who competed at the 1936 Summer Olympic Games and played in both games.
