= Paul Mehlitz =

German field hockey player

Olympic medal record

Men's field hockey
| Silver medal – second place | 1936 Berlin | Team competition |

Paul Mehlitz (25 December 1906 in Wilmersdorf - 7 December 1982 in Berlin) was a German field hockey player who competed in the 1936 Summer Olympics. He was a member of the German field hockey team, which won the silver medal. He played two matches as forward.
