= Shuja ud-Din =

Afghan field hockey player (born 1913)

Shuja ud-Din (born 12 September 1913, date of death unknown) was an Afghan field hockey player who competed at the 1936 Summer Olympic Games, playing in both of his team's games. He was a member of the Durrani dynasty, holding the title of shazada. Later in life, he married and had five children.

== See also ==
- List of royal Olympians
