= Inge Heybroek =

Dutch field hockey player

Olympic medal record

Men's field hockey
Bronze medal – third place	1936 Berlin	Team competition

Carl Erik "Inge" Heijbroek (12 October 1915 – 9 February 1956) was a Dutch field hockey player who competed in the 1936 Summer Olympics.

He was born in Hilversum and died in Dublin, Ireland

Heijbroek was a member of the Dutch field hockey team, which won the bronze medal. He played one match as forward.
