= Jan de Looper =

Dutch field hockey player

Olympic medal record

Men's field hockey
Bronze medal – third place	1936 Berlin	Team competition

Jan "Loep" de Looper (2 May 1914 – 23 June 1987) was a Dutch field hockey player who competed in the 1936 Summer Olympics. He was born and died in Hilversum.

He was a member of the Dutch field hockey team, which won the bronze medal. He played all five matches as goalkeeper. His older brother Henk de Looper was his teammate.
