= Werner Kubitzki =

German field hockey player (1915–1994)

Olympic medal record

Men's field hockey
Silver medal – second place	1936 Berlin	Team competition

Werner Kubitzki (10 April 1915 in Berlin-Wilmersdorf – 12 October 1994 in Zweibrücken) was a German field hockey player who competed in the 1936 Summer Olympics.

He was a member of the German field hockey team, which won the silver medal. He played one match as forward.
