= Ernst van den Berg =

Dutch field hockey player

Olympic medal record

Men's field hockey
Bronze medal – third place	1936 Berlin	Team competition

Ernst Willem van den Berg (3 December 1915, Amsterdam – 19 August 1989, Amsterdam) was a Dutch field hockey player who competed in the 1936 Summer Olympics.

He was a member of the Dutch field hockey team, which won the bronze medal. He played all five matches as forward.
