= Roland Annen =

Swiss field hockey player

Roland Annen (September 22, 1916 – 28 August 2005) was a Swiss field hockey player who competed in the 1936 Summer Olympics.

Annen played with the Stade Lausanne hockey club and was a member of the Swiss team in the 1936 Olympics which was eliminated in the group stage of the tournament. He played all three matches as forward.
