= Karl Dröse =

German field hockey player

Olympic medal record

Men's field hockey
| Silver medal – second place | 1936 Berlin | Team competition |

Karl Dröse (27 December 1913 in Frankfurt – 16 September 1996 in Frankfurt) was a German field hockey player who competed in the 1936 Summer Olympics.

He was a member of the German field hockey team, which won the silver medal. He played three matches as goalkeeper.
