= Heinrich Peter =

German field hockey player

Olympic medal record

Men's field hockey
Silver medal – second place	1936 Berlin	Team competition

Karl-August "Heinrich" Peter (born 13 June 1910; date of death unknown) was a German field hockey player who competed in the 1936 Summer Olympics. He was a member of the German field hockey team, which won the silver medal. He played one match as halfback.

Peter was an employee of Gestapo and a member of SS.
