= Heinz Raack =

German field hockey player

Olympic medal record

Men's field hockey
Silver medal – second place	1936 Berlin	Team competition

Heinz Raack (18 May 1917 in Berlin - 26 December 2002 in Berlin) was a German field hockey player who competed in the 1936 Summer Olympics. He made his international debut for Germany in 1935. At the 1936 Olympics, where Germany won the silver medal, he was the youngest member of the squad and played in the match against Denmark. Between 1935-1942 he played for Germany 15 times. He also played for Berliner Sport-Club when they won the first German Hockey Championship in 1937 and successfully defended their title in 1938.
