= Werner Hamel =

German field hockey player (1911–1987)

Olympic medal record

Men's field hockey
Silver medal – second place	1936 Berlin	Team competition

Werner Hamel (9 February 1911 in Berlin – 25 July 1987 in Hamburg) was a German field hockey player who competed in the 1936 Summer Olympics.

He was a member of the German field hockey team, which won the silver medal. He played two matches as forward.
