= Harald Huffmann =

German field hockey player

Olympic medal record

Men's field hockey
Silver medal – second place	1936 Berlin	Team competition

Harald Huffmann (3 June 1908 in Essen-Werden – 20 December 1992 in Essen-Werden) was a German field hockey player who competed in the 1936 Summer Olympics.

He was the captain of the German field hockey team, which won the silver medal. He played three matches as forward.
