= Ludwig Beisiegel =

German field hockey player

Olympic medal record

Men's field hockey
Silver medal – second place	1936 Berlin	Team competition

Ludwig Beisiegel (21 March 1912 – 21 October 1999) was a German field hockey player who competed in the 1936 Summer Olympics. He was a member of the German field hockey team, which won the silver medal. He played one match as forward.
