= Piet Gunning =

Dutch field hockey player

Olympic medal record

Men's field hockey
Bronze medal – third place	1936 Berlin	Team competition

Pieter "Piet" Adriaan Gunning (July 5, 1913 in Hoogkerk – May 23, 1967 in Bloemendaal) was a Dutch field hockey player who competed in the 1936 Summer Olympics.

He was a member of the Dutch field hockey team, which won the bronze medal. He played all five matches as forward.
