= Tonny van Lierop =

Dutch field hockey player

Olympic medal record

Men's field hockey
Silver medal – second place	1928 Amsterdam	Team competition
Bronze medal – third place	1936 Berlin	Team competition

Antoine Robert Onslow "Tonny" van Lierop (19 September 1910 in Vught – 31 March 1982 in Blaricum) was a Dutch field hockey player who competed in the 1936 Summer Olympics.

He was a member of the Dutch field hockey team, which won the bronze medal. He played all five matches as halfback.

In 1928 he was a squad member of the Dutch field hockey team, but he did not compete.
