= Fritz Messner =

German field hockey player

Olympic medal record

Men's field hockey
Silver medal – second place	1936 Berlin	Team competition

Fritz Messner (18 January 1912 in Berlin – 7 November 1945 in Kharkiv) was a German field hockey player who competed in the 1936 Summer Olympics in Berlin, Germany. He was a member of the German field hockey team, which won the silver medal. He played three matches as forward in his sole Olympics participation, against Afghanistan, Netherlands and the eventual winner, India. Messner won 28 caps with Germany between 1934-1942 and was champion in the 1940 German Championship with Berliner SV 92.

Between 1934 and 1942 he won 28 international caps. At the club level he played for Berliner SV 92 and won the German Championship in 1940

In November 1945, he was killed in action during World War II.
