= Henk de Looper =

Dutch field hockey player

Olympic medal record

Men's field hockey
Bronze medal – third place	1936 Berlin	Team competition

Hendrik Christiaan "Henk" de Looper (26 December 1912 in Hilversum – 2 January 2006 in Hilversum) was a Dutch field hockey player who competed in the 1936 Summer Olympics.

He was a member of the Dutch field hockey team, which won the bronze medal. He played all five matches as halfback.

His younger brother Jan de Looper was his teammate.
