= Aat de Roos =

Dutch field hockey player

Olympic medal record

Men's field hockey
Bronze medal – third place	1936 Berlin	Team competition

Agathon "Aat" de Roos (15 April 1919 in Bloemendaal, North Holland – 17 March 1992 in Perth, Australia) was a Dutch field hockey player who competed in the 1936 Summer Olympics.

He was a member of the Dutch field hockey team, which won the bronze medal. He played four matches as forward.
