= Detlef Okrent =

German field hockey player (1909–1983)

Olympic medal record

Men's field hockey
Silver medal – second place	1936 Berlin	Team competition

Detlef Okrent (26 October 1909 in Rostock – 24 January 1983 in Leverkusen) was a German field hockey player who competed in the 1936 Summer Olympics. He was also a member of the German NSDAP and SS.

He was a member of the German field hockey team, which won the silver medal. He played one match as back.

During World War II he became SS-Divisionsrichter within 2nd SS Panzer Division Das Reich in 1944. (NSDAP Nr.5038061; SS-Nr.120075)
