= Kurt Weiß =

German field hockey player

Olympic medal record

Men's field hockey
Silver medal – second place	1936 Berlin	Team competition
Bronze medal – third place	1928 Amsterdam	Team competition

Kurt "Kutti" Weiß (30 March 1906 in Berlin - 29 May 1995 in Berlin) was a German field hockey player who competed in the 1936 Summer Olympics.

He was a member of the German field hockey team, which won the silver medal. He played three matches as forward and he was the only player to score against India in the tournament.

In 1928 he was a squad member of the German field hockey team, but he did not compete.
