= László Cseri =

Hungarian field hockey player

László Cseri (also known as Cerva, 6 June 1912 – 29 December 1998) was a Hungarian field hockey player who competed in the 1936 Summer Olympics.

He was born and died in Budapest.

In 1936 he was a member of the Hungarian team which was eliminated in the group stage of the Olympic tournament. He played all three matches as forward and scored one goal.
