= Shahab-ud-Din Shabban =

Indian field hockey player (1909–1983)

Personal information
- Born: 8 November 1909
- Died: 6 January 1983 (aged 73)

Sport
- Club: Manavdar
Medal record
Men's field hockey
Representing India
Olympic Games
Gold medal – first place	1936 Berlin	Team competition

Shahab-ud-Din Shabban (8 November 1909 – 6 January 1983) was an Indian field hockey player who competed in the 1936 Summer Olympics.

He was a member of the Indian field hockey team, which won the gold medal at Berlin. He played four matches as forward.
