= Erwin Keller =

German field hockey player (1905–1971)

Olympic medal record

Men's Field hockey
Silver medal – second place	1936 Berlin	Team

Erwin Keller (8 April 1905 in Concepción - 31 July 1971 in West Berlin) was a field hockey player from Germany, who won the silver medal for his country at the 1936 Summer Olympics in Berlin.

Four members of his family have won field hockey gold for Germany. His son Carsten Keller captured the gold medal at the 1972 Summer Olympics as did three of his grandchildren, all as strikers. Andreas became Olympic champion in 1992 (Barcelona), after winning silver at the two previous Olympics in Los Angeles (1984) and Seoul (1988). Natascha competed in three Olympics, winning gold at the 2004 Summer Olympics in Athens. At the 2008 Summer Olympics Florian also won the gold medal for Germany.
