= Paul Sartorius (field hockey) =

French field hockey player

Paul Hélène Marie Joseph Sartorius (20 September 1912 – 13 February 2002) was a French field hockey player who competed in the 1936 Summer Olympics. He was born in Roubaix and is the nephew of Émile Sartorius.

Sartorius was a member of the French field hockey team, which finish fourth in the 1936 Olympic tournament. He played four matches as forward.
