= Mohammad Sultan (field hockey) =

Afghan field hockey player

Mohammad Sultan (23 December 1918 – 1971) was an Afghan field hockey player who competed at the 1936 Summer Olympic Games held in Berlin, playing in both of his team's games. He was a member of the Durrani dynasty by marriage, holding the title of shahzada. Later in life, he became a superintendent of the Punjab Police.

== See also ==
- List of royal Olympians
