= Carl Menke =

German field hockey player (1906–?)

Olympic medal record

Men's field hockey
Silver medal – second place	1936 Berlin	Team competition

Carl Menke (born 3 July 1906; date of death unknown) was a German field hockey player who competed in the 1936 Summer Olympics.

He was a member of the German field hockey team, which won the silver medal. He played one match as halfback.
