= Rein de Waal =

Dutch field hockey player

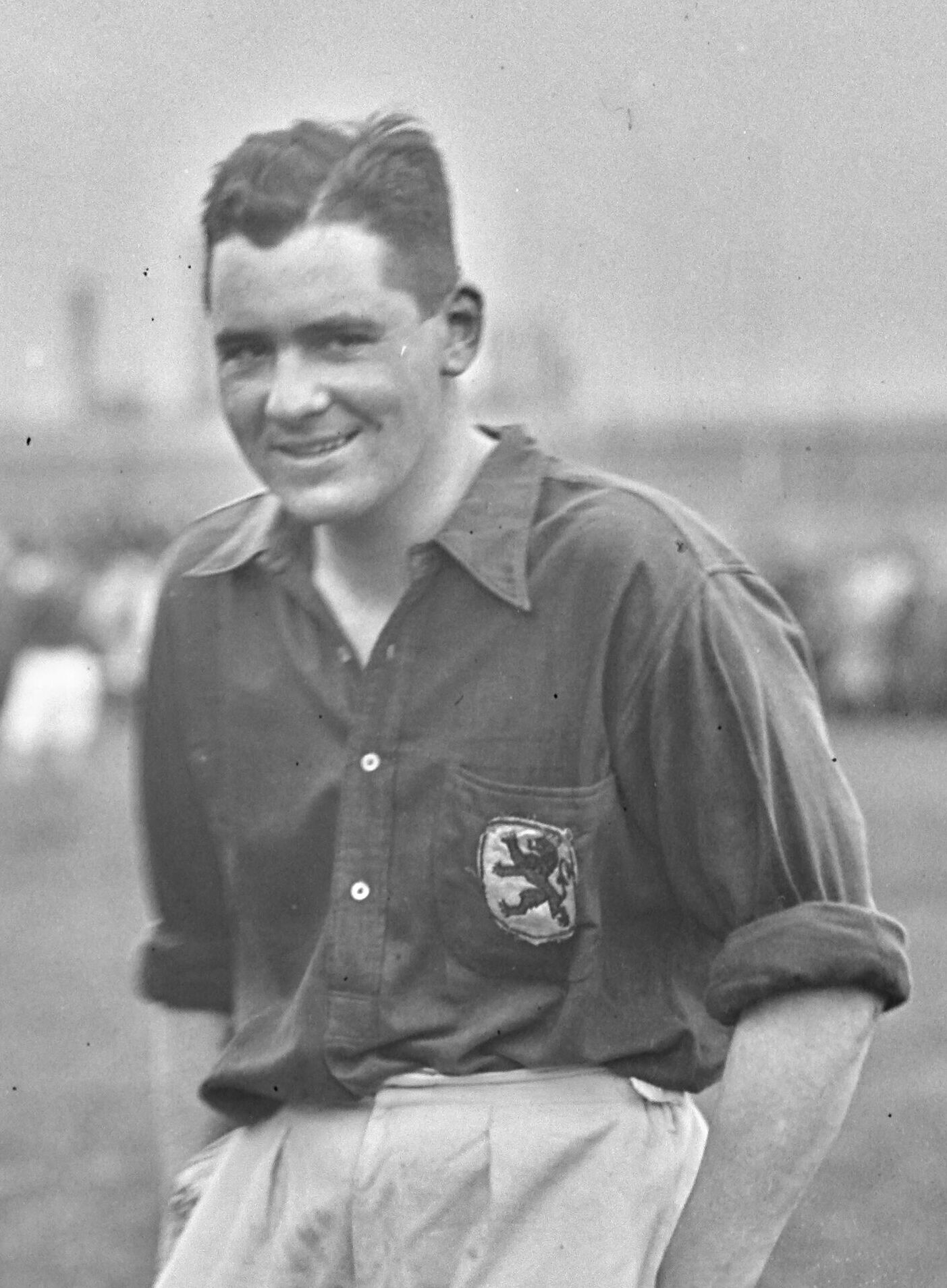

Medal record

Men's field hockey
Silver medal – second place	1928 Amsterdam	Team competition
Bronze medal – third place	1936 Berlin	Team competition

Reindert "Rein" Berend Jan de Waal (24 November 1904, Amsterdam – 31 May 1985, Amsterdam) was a Dutch field hockey player who competed in the 1928 Summer Olympics and in the 1936 Summer Olympics.

In 1928 he was a member of the Dutch field hockey team, which won the silver medal. He played all four matches as back.

Eight years later he won the bronze medal with the Dutch team. He played all five matchers as back.

Olympic Games
Preceded by Charles Pahud de Mortanges	Flagbearer for Netherlands; Berlin 1936	Succeeded by Wim Landman
