= Herbert Kemmer =

German field hockey player

Olympic medal record

Men's field hockey
| Silver medal – second place | 1936 Berlin | Team competition |
| Bronze medal – third place | 1928 Amsterdam | Team competition |

Herbert Kemmer (13 May 1905 – 10 December 1962) was a German field hockey player who competed in the 1928 Summer Olympics and in the 1936 Summer Olympics.

In 1928 he was a member of the German field hockey team, which won the bronze medal. He played two matches as forward.

Eight years later he won the silver medal in the field hockey competition.
