= René Sparenberg =

Dutch field hockey player

Olympic medal record

Men's field hockey
Bronze medal – third place	1936 Berlin	Team competition

René Sparenberg (3 December 1918 – 1 July 2013) was a Dutch field hockey player who competed in the 1936 Summer Olympics. Born in Semarang, Dutch East Indies, he was a member of the Dutch field hockey team, which won the bronze medal. He played all five matches as forward.
