= Erich Zander =

German field hockey player (1905–1991)

Olympic medal record

Men's field hockey
Silver medal – second place	1936 Berlin	Team competition
Bronze medal – third place	1928 Amsterdam	Team competition

Erich Zander (11 April 1905 in Kassel – 15 April 1991 in Eutin) was a German field hockey player who competed in the 1928 Summer Olympics and in the 1936 Summer Olympics. In 1928 he was a member of the German field hockey team, which won the bronze medal. He played all four matches as halfback. Eight years later he won the silver medal in the field hockey competition.
