= Hans Scherbart =

German field hockey player

Olympic medal record

Men's field hockey
Silver medal – second place	1936 Berlin	Team competition

Hans Scherbart (16 December 1905 in Berlin-Wilmersdorf - 17 February 1993 in Bad Münstereifel) was a German field hockey player who competed in the 1936 Summer Olympics.

He was a member of the German field hockey team, which won the silver medal. He played three matches as forward.
