= Louis Gilliéron =

Swiss field hockey player

Louis Gilliéron (18 November 1909 – 28 March 1995) was a Swiss field hockey player who competed in the 1936 Summer Olympics. In 1936 he was a member of the Swiss team which was eliminated in the group stage of the Olympic tournament. He played all three matches as halfback or forward.
