= Tito Warnholtz =

German field hockey player

Olympic medal record

Men's field hockey
Silver medal – second place	1936 Berlin	Team competition

Rudolf "Tito" Warnholtz (17 February 1906 in Hamburg – 12 January 1993 in Hamburg) was a German field hockey player who competed in the 1936 Summer Olympics.

He was a member of the German field hockey team, which won the silver medal. He played one match as goalkeeper.
