= Ahsan Muhammad Khan =

Indian field hockey player

Personal information
- Born: April 7, 1916
- Died: unknown
Medal record
Men's field hockey
Representing India
Olympic Games
Gold medal – first place	1936 Berlin	Team competition

Ahsan Muhammad Khan (born April 7, 1916, date of death unknown) was an Indian field hockey player who played as a halfback and competed in the 1936 Summer Olympics.

In the 1936 Olympic hockey tournament, he was a member of the gold-winning Indian field hockey team.
