= Cyril Michie =

Indian field hockey player (1900–1966)

Olympic medal record

Men's field hockey

Representing India

Olympic Games
Gold medal – first place	1936 Berlin	Team competition

Cyril James Michie (20 August 1900 – 10 November 1966) was an Indian field hockey player who competed in the 1936 Summer Olympics. He was educated at Goethals Memorial School in Kurseong and was a team-mate of Joseph Galibardy, who was at the same school.

In 1936, he was a member of the Indian field hockey team, which won the gold medal. He played one match as goaltender. No goals were scored against him.
