= Ali Dara =

Indian field hockey player (1915–1981)

Personal information
- Full name: Ali Iqtidar Shah Dara
- Born: 1 April 1915 Lyallpur (now called Faisalabad), Punjab, British India
- Died: 16 January 1981 at age 65 Karachi, Pakistan
- Resting place: Shah Jamal Graveyard, Lahore, Pakistan
Medal record
Men's field hockey
Representing India
Olympic Games
Gold medal – first place	1936 Berlin	Team competition

Ali Iqtidar Shah Dara (1 April 1915 – 16 January 1981) was an Indian and later Pakistani field hockey player and the longest-serving hockey manager who competed in the 1936 Summer Olympics and the 1948 Summer Olympics.

In 1936, he was a member of the British Indian field hockey team, which won the gold medal at the 1936 Summer Olympics. He played two matches as forward. "Dara played in the hockey team at Berlin in 1936 when an undivided India won the gold, defeating the home team Germany (8-1). Sitting in the VIP stand was Chancellor Adolf Hitler, leader of the Nazi party ruling Germany."

Dara was also a serving officer in the Indian Army. His army regiment was sent to Malaysia during the Second World War, where Dara was captured by the Japanese in Malaya.

In 1947, British India was divided into India and Pakistan. Dara, who hailed from West Punjab province of undivided India, opted to live in Pakistan.

Twelve years later he participated in the 1948 tournament for Pakistan as the team captain. Dara was easily the best choice to construct and lead Pakistan's hockey team to 1948 Summer Olympics. He played all seven matches as a forward and scored nine goals in the competition. They faced Holland in the bronze-medal match, which the two teams drew with a goal each. This match was replayed later, during which Pakistan was defeated 4-1, leaving them in 4th place.

Dara was the manager of the Pakistan hockey team at 1976 Montreal Olympic Games, where Pakistan won the bronze medal.

== See also ==
- List of sportspeople who competed for more than one nation
- Field hockey players who competed for more than one nation
