= Heinz Schmalix =

German field hockey player

Olympic medal record

Men's field hockey
Silver medal – second place	1936 Berlin	Team competition

Heinrich "Heinz" Schmalix (24 July 1910 – 6 October 1975) was a German field hockey player who competed in the 1936 Summer Olympics. He was a member of the German field hockey team, which won the silver medal. He played three matches as halfback.
