= Hans Schnitger =

Dutch field hockey player

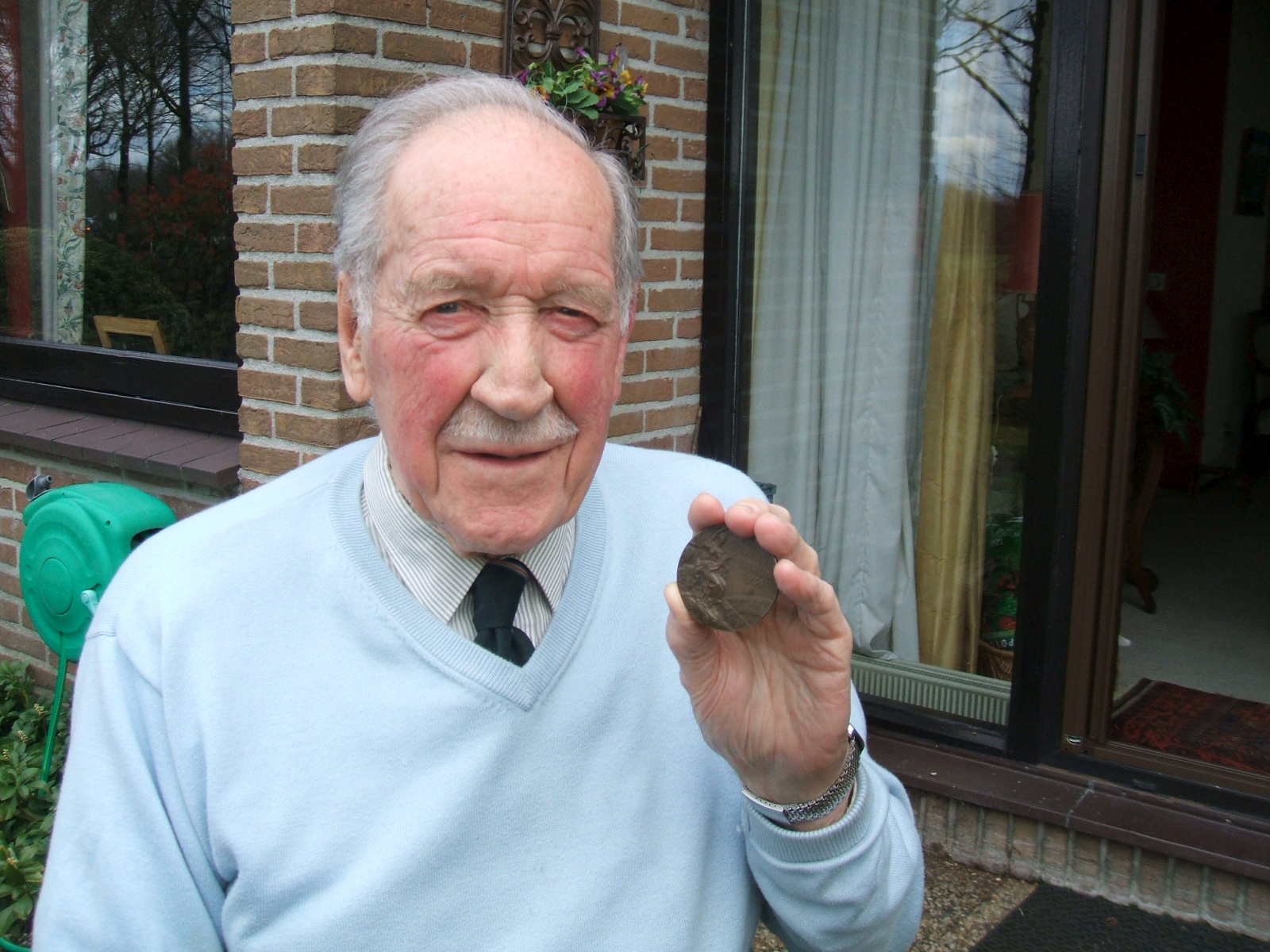

Medal record

Men's field hockey
| Bronze medal – third place | 1936 Berlin | Team competition |

Henri Carel Willem "Hans" Schnitger (August 5, 1915 – March 1, 2013) was a Dutch field hockey player who competed in the 1936 Summer Olympics. Schnitger was a member of the Dutch field hockey team, which won the bronze medal. He played all five matches as forward. He was born in Enschede, where he lived until his death.
