= Sayed Jaffar (field hockey) =

Indian field hockey player (1911–1937)

Olympic medal record

Men's field hockey

Representing India
Gold medal – first place	1932 Los Angeles	Team competition
Gold medal – first place	1936 Berlin	Team competition

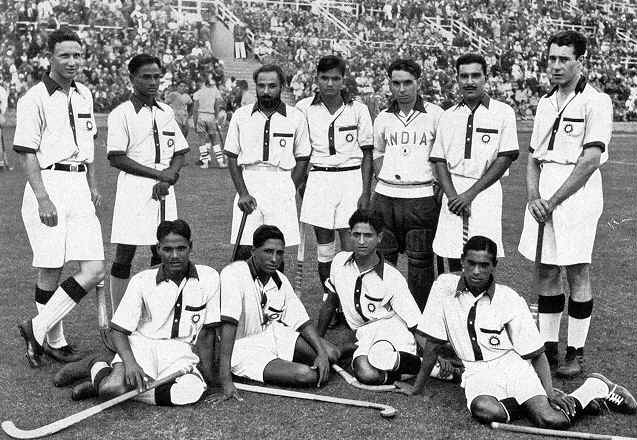
Sayed Mohammad Jaffar Shah, standing, 6th from left in this group photo of the British Indian Hockey Team at the 1936 Summer Olympics in Berlin.

Sayed Mohammad Jaffar Shah (December 1911 – 21 March 1937) was an Indian field hockey player who competed in the 1932 Summer Olympics and 1936 Summer Olympics.

== Early life and education ==
He was born in Shergarh, District Montgomery, British India (now in Okara District, Punjab, Pakistan). Jaffar received his education at the Aitchison College, Lahore and at the Government College, Lahore.

== Playing career ==
In 1932 he was a member of the All India team that represented the country in field hockey at the 1932 Summer Olympics. The team won the gold medal. He played two matches as left-out.

Four years later in 1936, he was again the member of the All India field hockey team. The team again won the gold medal for field hockey at the 1936 Summer Olympics. He played five matches as left-out.

== Death and memory ==
He died as a result of a drowning accident on banks of river Ravi, near Lahore, on 21 March 1937.

A hockey pavilion was constructed at the Aitchison College Lahore in 1939 as a tribute to the memory of Jaffar and his services to field hockey in British India.

Jaffar Memorial hockey tournament is organised annually by Ali Institute of Education in Lahore.

== Grave and epitaph ==
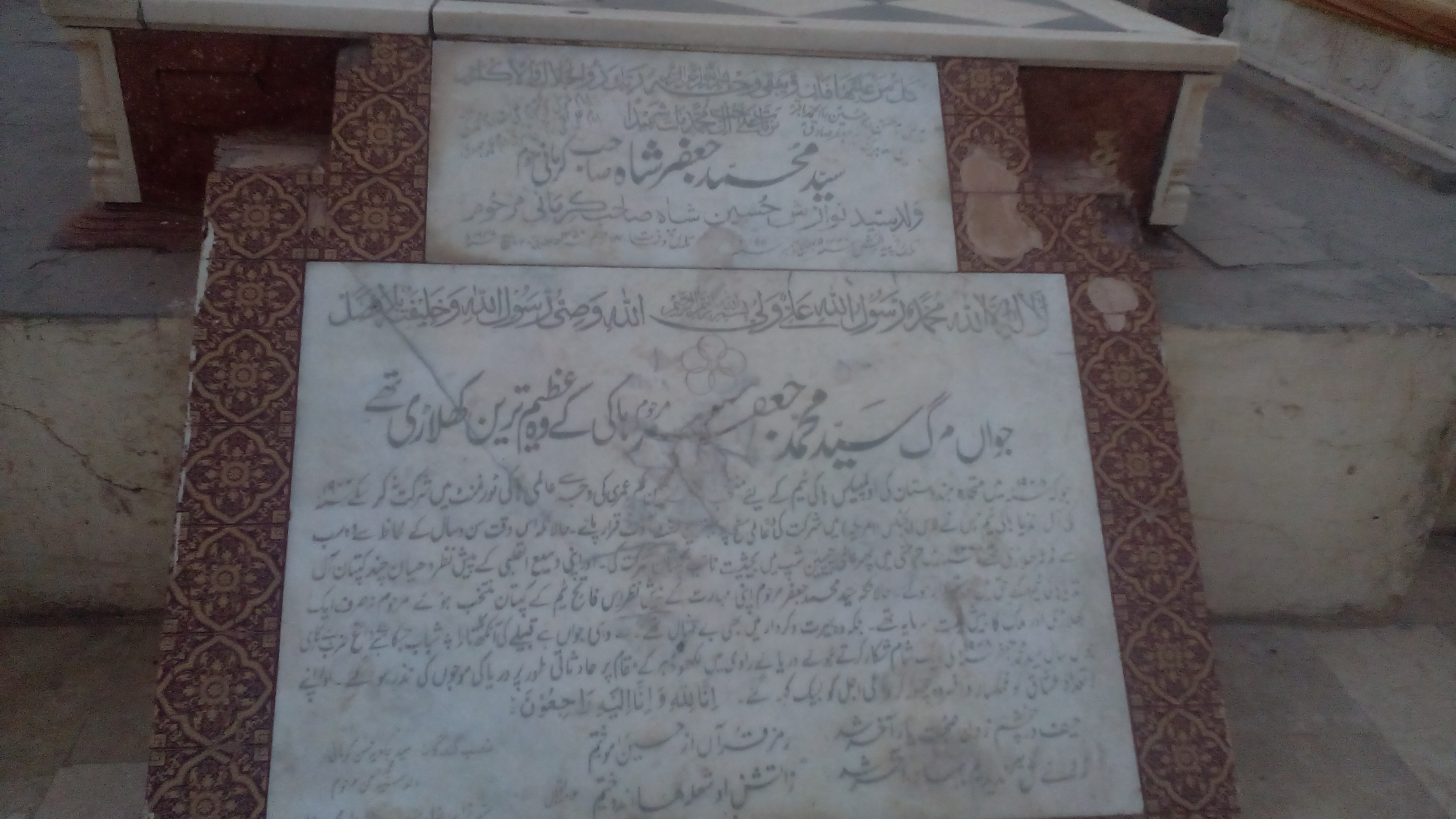

The inscription in Urdu language on the gravestone reads:

"Syed Mohammad Jaffar Shah Kirmani son of Syed Nawazish Hussain Shah Kirmani, Date of Birth: December 1911, Date of Death: 21 March 1937.

"(Late) Syed Mohammad Jaffar was one of the players of (field) hockey, who was selected to the 1928 United India (All India) Olympics (field) hockey team but he could not participate in that global event due to his youthful age. In 1932, he was a member of the All India (field) hockey team that participated in Los Angeles (US) Olympics. He was considered one of the best players in the world on 'left-out' position although he was one of the youngest. He participated once again in the 1936 Olympics as vice-captain. Out of magnanimity of his heart, he decided not to be a candidate for the captaincy in favour of Dhyan Chand, although initially, he was being considered as captain of this victorious team because of his professionalism and skill level. He was not only a brilliant sportsman and a great representative (plus an asset) of the country but also a figure of exemplary mannerism and conduct.

"On the fateful evening of 21 March 1937, while on an hunting expedition on river Ravi near Lakho Dehar, he accidentally gave his life away to the river. He saddened his huge fan following and opted to respond to the call of the God.

"Gravestone laid down by Syed Javed Hassan son of (Late) Syed Mohammad Hassan."

An Urdu verse is also inscribed on the tombstone:

وہی جواں ہے قبیلے کی آنکھ کا تارا
شباب جس کا ہو بے تاب، ضرب ہو کاری
