= Ru van der Haar =

Dutch field hockey player

Olympic medal record

Men's field hockey
Bronze medal – third place	1936 Berlin	Team competition

Rudolf "Ru" Jacob van der Haar (6 October 1913 in Banjoemas, Java, Dutch East Indies – 15 May 1943 in Maoemere, Dutch East Indies) was a Dutch field hockey player who competed in the 1936 Summer Olympics. He was a member of the Dutch field hockey team, which won the bronze medal. He played all five matches as halfback.

He died in a Japanese camp during World War II.
