= Ernst Hufschmid (handballer) =

Swiss handball player

Olympic medal record

Men's handball
Bronze medal – third place	1936 Berlin	Team competition

Ernst Hufschmid (born October 9, 1910, date of death unknown) was a Swiss field handball player who competed in the 1936 Summer Olympics.

He was part of the Swiss field handball team, which won the bronze medal. He played all five matches.
