= Roop Singh =

Indian field hockey player

Roop Singh Bais
Personal information
- Born: 8 September 1908 Jabalpur, Central Provinces, British India
- Died: 16 December 1977 (aged 69) Gwalior, India
- Height: 6 ft (183 cm)

Sport
- Sport: Field hockey
- Position: Left-in
National team
Years	Team	Caps	Goals
–	India		-
Medal record
Men's field hockey
Representing India
Olympic Games
Gold medal – first place	1932 Los Angeles	Team
Gold medal – first place	1936 Berlin	Team
Western Asiatic Games
Gold medal – first place	1934 Delhi	Team

Roop Singh Bais (8 September 1908 – 16 December 1977) was an Indian hockey player. He was part of the Indian field hockey team, which won gold medals for India at the 1932 and 1936 Olympic Games. He was the younger brother of Dhyan Chand.

== Career ==
Singh became famous during the Los Angeles Summer Olympics hockey tournament in 1932 after he scored three goals against Japan and 10 goals against the US. He worked for the armed forces.

== Personal life ==
Singh was the younger brother of Dhyan Chand, and won the gold medal in the 1932 and 1936 Olympic Games for Indian hockey team.

Singh was from Bais Rajput family based in Gwalior, Madhya Pradesh. His son Bhagat Singh and grandson Uday Singh, both played field hockey for India. His father, Subedar Sameshwar Singh, was in the army.

== Recognition ==
The Captain Roop Singh Stadium in Gwalior, named after Singh, was originally a hockey stadium before it was converted into a cricket venue in 1988. The German Olympic Committee sent Singh a map showing a street in Munich bearing his name following his impressive performance at the 1936 Olympics. He was also among only three Indian players, the others being Dhyan Chand and Leslie Claudius, to have the tube stations in London renamed in the run-up to the 2012 Summer Olympics.
