= Mirza Masood =

Indian field hockey player (1906–1991)

- Born: Mirza Nasir-ud-din Masood; 13 October 1908; Delhi, British India
- Died: 19 September 1991 (aged 82); Delhi, India
- Spouse: Atiya Masood
- Awards: Olympic Gold Medallist
- Honours: Ambassador, UNESCO Mission Chief
- Field hockey career
- Sport: Field hockey
National team
Years	Team	Caps	Goals
–	India		-
Medal record
Men's field hockey
Representing India
Olympic Games
Gold medal – first place	1936 Berlin	Team

Mirza Nasir-ud-din Masood (23 April 1906 – 21 September 1991) was an Indian field hockey player who competed in the 1936 Summer Olympics.

In 1936 he was a member of the Indian field hockey team, which won the gold medal. He played one match as halfback.

In 1948, Masood became private secretary to India's first Minister of Education, Abul Kalam Azad. He was temporarily released from that role in 1952 when he was appointed the UNESCO Mission Chief to Indonesia, where he remained until 1957. Following Azad's death in 1958, Jawaharlal Nehru successively appointed Masood as Advisor on Physical Education and Recreation, Consul General responsible for Muscat and Oman, the Emirates, and Bahrain, and Ambassador to Saudi Arabia. Upon his return to India in 1964, he was made secretary of the Central Waqf Board by Lal Bahadur Shastri.

Masood retired to Delhi in 1968 with his wife Atiya. He died in 1991 and was buried in Nizamuddin cemetery.
