= Baboo Nimal =

Indian field hockey player (1905–1998)

Babu Nimal
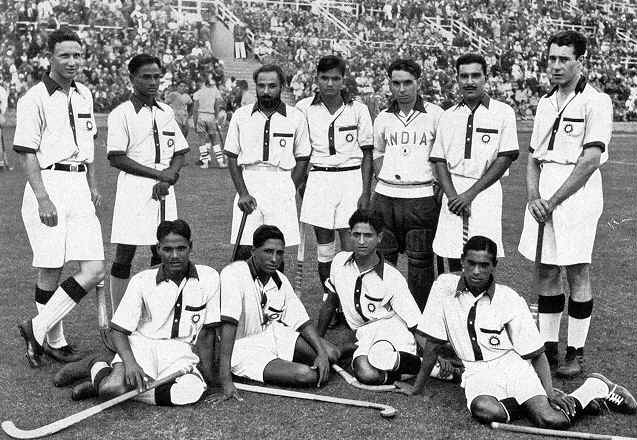
- Babu Nimal with the Indian team at the 1936 Berlin Olympics

Personal information
- Born: 17 February 1905 Khadki, British India
- Died: 20 February 1998 (aged 93)

Sport
- Sport: Field hockey
- Position: Field hockey#Positions# Center Half
National team
Years	Team	Caps	Goals
–	India		-
Medal record
Men's field hockey
Representing India
Olympic Games
Gold medal – first place	1936 Berlin	Team competition

Baburao Narsanna Nimal (17 February 1905 – 20 February 1998) was an Indian field hockey player who competed in the 1936 Summer Olympics. He was a member of the Indian team which won the gold medal at the 1936 Olympic Games. He played all the matches in the Olympics (including the final) as a Center Half.
