= Ahmed Sher Khan =

Indian field hockey player (1914–1982)

Olympic medal record

Men's field hockey

Representing India
Gold medal – first place	1936 Berlin	Team

Ahmed Sher Khan (15 December 1914 – September 1982) was an Indian field hockey player who competed in the 1936 Summer Olympics. He was a member of the Indian field hockey team, which won the gold medal. His son Aslam Sher Khan is also a former hockey player who was a part of the gold-winning Indian hockey team at the 1975 World Cup.
