= Lionel Emmett =

Indian field hockey player (1913–1996)

Olympic medal record

Men's field hockey

Representing India
Gold medal – first place	1936 Berlin	Team competition

Lionel Charles Renwick Emmett (8 January 1913 – 9 August 1996) was an Indian field hockey player and physician who competed in the 1936 Summer Olympics. He was a member of the Indian field hockey team, which won the gold medal. He played one match as forward.

Emmett was born in India in 1913. He received medical training in Calcutta Medical College. He served as a medical officer is the Indian Army Corps in field hospitals in India and Burma. He rose to the rank of lieutenant colonel. Later, he practiced as a general practitioners in the tea plantations of Assam. Following his retirement, he went to England in 1960s. He patented an Intra uterine contraceptive device named Copper Omega. Also, he developed two more medical devices: the Emmett Thread Retriever and the Emmett Thread Detector.
