= Max Westerkamp =

Dutch field hockey player

Olympic medal record

Men's field hockey
Bronze medal – third place	1936 Berlin	Team competition

Max Westerkamp (8 October 1912 in Tandjong Pura, Sumatra, Dutch East Indies – 6 May 1970 in Enschede) was a Dutch field hockey player who competed in the 1936 Summer Olympics.

He was a member of the Dutch field hockey team, which won the bronze medal. He played all five matches as back.
