= Joseph Galibardy =

Indian field hockey player (1915–2011)

Olympic medal record

Men's field hockey

Representing India
Gold medal – first place	1936 Berlin	Team competition

Joseph Deville Thomas Galibardy (10 January 1915 – 17 May 2011) was an Indian field hockey player who competed in the 1936 Summer Olympics.

In 1936 he was a member of the Indian field hockey team, which won the gold medal. He played five matches as halfback.

== Career ==
Galibardy was born in Madras and received his school education from Goethals Memorial School, Kurseong in India. He visited his alma-mater, when Goethals celebrated its centenary in the year 2007 at the age of 93. Goethals Memorial School is also the alma-mater of his teammate Cyril Michie. Galibardy moved to England in 1956 and lived in Walthamstow, London at the time of his death. He was the last surviving member of the 1936 Indian field hockey team that won the gold medal.
