= Peter Paul Fernandes =

Indian field hockey player (1916–1981)

Olympic medal record

Men's Field Hockey

Representing India
Gold medal – first place	1936 Berlin	Team competition

Peter Paul Fernandes M.B.E (15 September 1916 – 24 January 1981) was an Indian field hockey player who competed at the 1936 Summer Olympics in Berlin, Germany. His selection made him the first Goan to represent India in hockey at the Olympics. He attended Saint Patrick's High School, Karachi. He also played in nine first-class cricket matches.

== Playing career ==
He played with the Karachi Goan Association team. His playing position was forward.
