= Joseph Phillips (field hockey) =

Indian field hockey player (1911–1987)

Olympic medal record

Men's field hockey

Representing India

Olympic Games
Gold medal – first place	1936 Berlin	Team competition

Joseph Phillips (24 March 1911 – 13 November 1987) was an Indian field hockey player who competed in the 1936 Summer Olympics. He was a member of the Indian field hockey team which won the gold medal. He played one match as back.

Phillips was a Pune based hockey player. Joseph was born on March 24, 1911. Phillips was an Indian field hockey player who competed in the 1936 Summer Olympics at Berlin and won the gold medal. He played one match as back. India played 5 matches in the tournament and the team won all 5. The Indian national team scored a total of 38 goals. India beat United States (7-0), Japan (9-0) and Hungary (4-0). The Indian national hockey team that played in the 1936 Summer Olympics consisted of Dhyan Chand (captain), Ali Dara, Syed Mohammed Jaffar, Gurcharan Singh, Roop Singh, Mohammed Hussain, Mirza Nasir-ud-din Masud, Shabban Shahab-ud-din, Joseph Galibardy, Ahmed Sher Khan, Babu N. Nimal and Lionel C. Emmett, amongst others. In the finals against Germany, India had an advantage of 6 goals initially. The match was very challenging and exciting. Finally India won the match by beating Germany by 8-1. That year, India won its third consecutive Olympic gold medal.

Joseph Phillips, along with Baboo Nimal, were amongst the players from Pune who participated in the 1936 Indian Olympic team. Most of the residents of his local town appeared on the Khadki Railway Station to bid farewell to Phillips and Baburao, for the 1936 Olympic expedition. It was a huge honour for both Joseph Phillips and Baburao Narasappa Nimal. Joe Phillips died in 1987 at the age of 76.
