= Gurcharan Singh Grewal =

Indian field hockey player (1911–1949)

Medal record

Men's field hockey

Representing India

Olympic Games
| Gold medal – first place | 1936 Berlin | Team |

Western Asiatic Games
| Gold medal – first place | 1934 Delhi | Team |

Lt. Colonel Sardar Gurcharan Singh Grewal (4 May 1911 – 7 February 1949) was an Indian field hockey player who competed in the 1936 Summer Olympics.

India beat Germany in the final of the 1936 Summer Olympics to clinch gold medal.

Gurcharan played one pool match against US during this tournament at Berlin. He played as left-fullback in this match.

== Errata ==
His obituary published in The Indian Express, Madras on 11 February 1949 (Dak edition), p. 7, mistakenly spells his name as Gurbachan Singh Grewal.
