= Field hockey at the 1936 Summer Olympics =

Field hockey at the Games of the XI Olympiad
- Venue: Hockey Olympic Stadium
- Dates: 4–15 August 1936
- Teams: 11

Medalists
1st place, gold medalist(s)		India
2nd place, silver medalist(s)		Germany
3rd place, bronze medalist(s)		Netherlands

The field hockey tournament at the 1936 Summer Olympics was the fifth edition of the field hockey event at the Summer Olympics.

All games took place either in the Hockey Stadion or on the Hockey Stadion Field No.2. Both of the field hockey grounds were near the Olympic Stadium located on the Reichssportfeld. The competition was held from 4 August 1936 to 15 August 1936. The field hockey matches saw a total attendance of 184,103 and 157,531 tickets were sold. The Indian team scored 38 goals, but only 1 goal was scored against them. British India were the Gold medalists.

Only a men's competition occurred that year.

== Medal summary ==
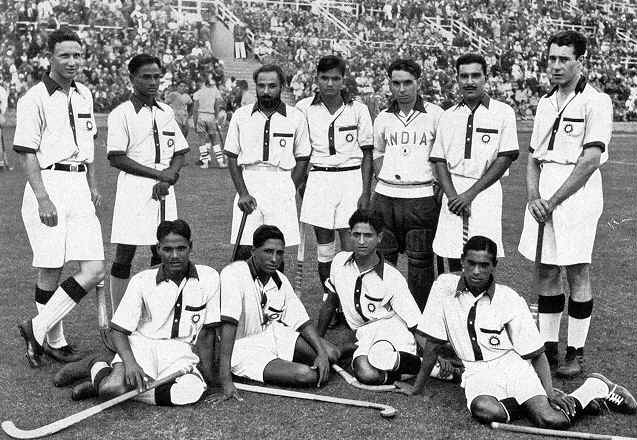
India's field hockey team, captained by hockey wizard Dhyan Chand (standing second from left), was the gold medal winner

Gold	Silver	Bronze
India Richard Allen; Dhyan Chand; Ali Dara; Lionel Emmett; Peter Fernandes; Joseph Galibardy; Earnest Goodsir-Cullen; Mohammed Hussain; Sayed Jaffar; Ahmed Khan; Ahsan Khan; Mirza Masood; Cyril Michie; Baboo Nimal; Joseph Phillips; Shahab-ud-Din Shabban; G.S. Garewal; Roop Singh; Carlyle Tapsell	Germany Hermann auf der Heide; Ludwig Beisiegel; Erich Cuntz; Karl Dröse; Alfred Gerdes; Werner Hamel; Harald Huffmann; Erwin Keller; Herbert Kemmer; Werner Kubitzki; Paul Mehlitz; Karl Menke; Fritz Messner; Detlef Okrent; Heinrich Peter; Heinz Raack; Carl Ruck; Hans Scherbart; Heinz Schmalix; Tito Warnholtz; Kurt Weiß; Erich Zander	Netherlands Ernst van den Berg; Piet Gunning; Ru van der Haar; Inge Heybroek; Tonny van Lierop; Henk de Looper; Jan de Looper; Aat de Roos; Hans Schnitger; René Sparenberg; Rein de Waal; Max Westerkamp

Note: The International Olympic Committee medal database shows also only these players as medalists. They all played at least one match during the tournament. The reserve players are not listed as medalists.

== Results ==
=== Group stage ===
==== Group A ====
Pos	Team	Pld	W	D	L	GF	GA	GD	Pts	Qualification
1	India	3	3	0	0	20	0	+20	6	Semi-finals
2	Japan	3	2	0	1	8	11	−3	4	
3	Hungary	3	1	0	2	4	8	−4	2	
4	United States	3	0	0	3	2	15	−13	0	

Source: TheSports.org

5 August 1936
16:30

Japan	5–1	United States
Takeo Ito 14' ? ?', ?', ?', ?'	Report	Horace Disston ?'

Umpires:
J. Schenkmann (SUI)
A. Lepètre (FRA)

5 August 1936
18:00

India	4–0	Hungary
Tapsell 25'; R. Singh ?', ?'; Shahab-ud-Din 45'	Report

Umpires:
Jaap Quarles van Ufford (NED)
Albert Demaurex (SUI)

7 August 1936
16:30

India	7–0	United States
Jaffar 28', 34'; Chand 33', ?'; R. Singh 55', ?'; Goodsir-Cullen ?'	Report

Umpires:
R. Marsily (BEL)
Helmut Rohrig (GER)

8 August 1936
18:00

Japan	3–1	Hungary
? ?', ?', ?'	Report	Háray ?'

Umpires:
Paul Reinberg (GER)
Yaqub (AFG)

10 August 1936
16:30

India	9–0	Japan
Fernandes ?', ?'; Tapsell ?', ?'; Chand ?', ?', ?', ?'; R. Singh ?'	Report

Umpires:
M. Furgeot (FRA)
Theo Everkink (NED)

10 August 1936
18:00

Hungary	3–1	United States
Cseri ?'; Márffy ?'; Háray ?'	Report	Sheaffer ?'

Umpires:
F. Thielemann (GER)
Jehan Daubresse (FRA)

==== Group B ====
Pos	Team	Pld	W	D	L	GF	GA	GD	Pts	Qualification
1	Germany (H)	2	2	0	0	10	1	+9	4	Semi-finals
2	Afghanistan	2	0	1	1	7	10	−3	1	
3	Denmark	2	0	1	1	6	12	−6	1	

Source: TheSports.org
(H) Hosts

4 August 1936
18:00

Afghanistan	6–6	Denmark
? ?', ?', ?', ?', ?', ?'	Report	Kirkegaard ?'; Prahm ?'; Busch ?'; Holst ?', ?', ?'

Umpires:
René Jassoy (GER)
A. Croset (SUI)

6 August 1936
18:00

Germany	6–0	Denmark
Beisiegel 21', ?'; Mehlitz 26'; Weiß ?', ?', ?'	Report

Umpires:
A. de la Bue (BEL)
Theo van 't Lam (NED)

8 August 1936
16:30

Germany	4–1	Afghanistan
Cuntz 25', ?'; Hamel ?'; Messner ?'	Report	Sultan 68'

Umpires:
A. de la Bue (BEL)
Albert Demaurex (SUI)

==== Group C ====
Pos	Team	Pld	W	D	L	GF	GA	GD	Pts	Qualification
1	Netherlands	3	2	1	0	9	4	+5	5	Semi-finals
2	France	3	1	1	1	4	5	−1	3	Semi-finals
3	Belgium	3	0	2	1	5	6	−1	2	
4	Switzerland	3	1	0	2	3	6	−3	2	

Source: TheSports.org

4 August 1936
16:30

France	1–0	Switzerland
Sartorius 63'	Report

Umpires:
Bruce Turnbull (GBR)
Theo Everkink (NED)

4 August 1936
18:00

Belgium	2–2	Netherlands
Delaval 7'; Delheid ?'	Report	Schnitger 14', 26'

Umpires:
Paul Reinberg (GER)
M. Furgeot (FRA)

6 August 1936
16:30

Netherlands	4–1	Switzerland
van den Berg 22', ?', 70'; Schnitger 30'	Report	Annen 27'

Umpires:
Robert Liégeois (BEL)
Hörmann (GER)

7 August 1936
18:00

Belgium	2–2	France
Rensburg ?'; Delaval ?'	Report	Soulé ?'; Goubert 65'

Umpires:
Jagan Nath (IND)
Hans Goerne (GER)

9 August 1936
16:30

Switzerland	2–1	Belgium
Scherrer ?'; Courvoisier 67'	Report	Delheid 45'

Umpires:
Hörmann (GER)
Theo van 't Lam (NED)

9 August 1936
18:00

Netherlands	3–1	France
van den Berg 12' de Roos ?'; Gunning ?'	Report	Rouget ?'

Umpires:
Bruce Turnbull (GBR)
Charles Newham (GBR)

=== Classification round ===
11 August 1936
18:00

Afghanistan	4–1	Belgium
Sultan ?'; Al-Zadah ?'; Shuja ud-Din ?', ?'	Report	de Melen ?'

Umpires:
Helmut Rohrig (GER)
Bruce Turnbull (GBR)

11 August 1936
16:30

Switzerland	5–1	Denmark
Courvoisier ?'; Scherrer ?'; Fehr ?'; Gilliéron ?'; Annen ?'	Report	Holst ?'

Umpires:
Pankaj Gupta (IND)
R. Marsily (BEL)

13 August 1936
18:00

Hungary	1–0	Belgium
Kormos ?'	Report

Umpires:
René Jassoy (GER)
Yaqub (AFG)

13 August 1936
16:30

Japan	4–1	Denmark
? ?', ?', ?', ?'	Report	? ?'

Umpires:
Hans Goerne (GER)
J. Schenkmann (SUI)

13 August 1936
18:00

Afghanistan	3–0	United States
Sultan 15', 39'; Shuja ud-Din 59'	Report

Umpires:
F. Thielemann (GER)
Charles Newham (GBR)

== Medal round ==
Semi-finals
12 August
India	10
France	0
12 August
Germany	3
Netherlands	0

Gold medal match
15 August
India	8
Germany	1
Bronze medal match
14 August
Netherlands	4
France	3

=== Semi-finals ===
12 August 1936
16:30

India	10–0	France
Chand ?', ?', ?', ?'; Singh ?', ?', ?'; Dara ?', ?'; Tapsell ?'	Report

Umpires:
Paul Reinberg (GER)
A. de la Bue {BEL)

12 August 1936
18:00

Germany	3–0	Netherlands
Weiß 22', 60'; Messner 45'	Report

Umpires:
Jagan Nath (IND)
M. Furgeot (FRA)

=== Bronze medal match ===
14 August 1936
16:30

(bronze) Netherlands	4–3	France
van den Berg ?', ?'; Schnitger ?', ?'	Report	Soulé ?', ?', 58'

Umpires:
Hörmann (GER)
Jagan Nath (IND)

=== Gold medal match ===
15 August 1936
11:00

(gold) India	8–1	Germany (silver)
Singh 33'; Tapsell 42'; Chand 44', 47', 70'; Jaffar 52'; Dara 62', 63'	Report; Report	Weiß 51'

Umpires:
Robert Liégeois (BEL)
Theo van 't Lam (NED)

The final was originally scheduled also on 14 August, just after the bronze medal match. But due to incessant rain, the ground was unplayable and the match was postponed to the following morning.

== Participating nations ==
Each country was allowed to enter a team of 22 players and they all were eligible for participation. A total number of 214 field hockey players were entered.

A total of 161(*) field hockey players from 11 nations competed at the Berlin Games:

- Afghanistan (12 - from a squad of 18)
- Belgium (12 - from a squad of 22)
- Denmark (13 - from a squad of 17)
- France (18 - from a squad of 22)
- Germany (22)
- Hungary (15 - from a squad of 21)
- India (19 - from a squad of 22)
- Japan (11 - from a squad of 15)
- Netherlands (12 - from a squad of 18)
- Switzerland (13 - from a squad of 22)
- United States (14 - from a squad of 15)

(*) NOTE: There are only players counted, which participated in one game at least. The consolation rounds did not count.

There are only a few reserve players known. Five players from Belgium, three players from Denmark, and two players from Japan only competed in the consolation rounds, but not all their names are known.

== Final standings ==
1. India
2. Germany
3. Netherlands
4. France
5. Switzerland
6. Afghanistan
7. Japan
8. Hungary
9. Belgium
10. Denmark
11. United States
