= Deaths in June 1996 =

The following is a list of notable deaths in June 1996.

Entries for each day are listed alphabetically by surname. A typical entry lists information in the following sequence:

- Name, age, country of citizenship at birth, subsequent country of citizenship (if applicable), reason for notability, cause of death (if known), and reference.

== June 1996 ==
=== 1 ===
- Vittorino Colombo, 71, Italian politician.
- Gaetano Fichera, 74, Italian mathematician.
- Michael Fox, 75, American actor, pneumonia.
- Don Grolnick, 48, American musician, lymphoma.
- Jack Hemi, 81, New Zealand rugby player.
- Attiqur Rahman, 77, Pakistani general and military historian.
- Neelam Sanjiva Reddy, 83, Sixth President of India, pneumonia.
- Ryszard Skwarski, 66, Polish Olympic canoeist (1956, 1960).

=== 2 ===
- John Alton, 94, American cinematographer (An American in Paris), Oscar winner (1952).
- Ishmael Bernal, 57, Filipino director, cardiovascular disease.
- Rene Bond, 45, American pornographic actress, cirrhosis.
- Ray Combs, 40, American stand-up comedian, actor, and game-show host (Family Feud), suicide by hanging.
- Stewart Evans, 87, Canadian ice hockey player (Montreal Canadiens).
- Alberto Farnese, 69, Italian actor.
- Leon Garfield, 74, English children's writer, cancer.
- Pilar Lorengar, 68, Spanish operatic soprano, lung cancer.
- Gene Snyder, 65, American baseball player (Los Angeles Dodgers).
- Amos Tversky, 59, Israeli psychologist, melanoma.
- William Van Pelt, 91, American politician, member of the United States House of Representatives (1951-1965).
- James Walker, 70, Australian Olympic alpine skier (1956).

=== 3 ===
- Arthur J. O. Anderson, 88, American anthropologist specializing in Aztec culture.
- Veniero Colasanti, 85, Italian costume designer, set decorator and art director.
- Ben Couch, 70, New Zealand politician and rugby union player.
- Bill Cox, 91, American Olympic long-distance runner (1924).
- Peter Glenville, 82, English actor director and producer, myocardial infarction.
- Ferdinand Leitner, 84, German composer and conductor.
- Tito Okello, 82, President of Uganda.
- Hideo Sakai, 86, Japanese association football player, pneumonia.
- Gitchandra Tongbra, 83, Indian satirist, poet, playwright and art academic.
- Aimo Tukiainen, 78, Finnish sculptor.

=== 4 ===
- María Luisa Anido, 89, Spanish musician.
- Alfonso Canti, 75, Italian Olympic weightlifter (1952).
- Cliff Holton, 67, English football player.
- Nel Roos-Lodder, 82, Dutch Olympic discus thrower (1948).
- Harry Verdon, 86, Australian rules footballer.
- Aloha Wanderwell, 89, Canadian-American explorer, author, filmmaker, and aviator.

=== 5 ===
- Erich Bagge, 84, German physicist.
- Jack Beaton, 82, Australian rugby player.
- Patrick Cordier, 49, French alpinist, traffic collision.
- Hartono Rekso Dharsono, 70, Indonesian general.
- Jan Kerouac, 44, American writer and only child of author Jack Kerouac and Joan Haverty Kerouac.
- Felicja Schabińska, 86, Polish Olympic hurdler (1932).
- Vito Scotti, 78, American actor, lung cancer.
- Anne-Marie Ørbeck, 85, Norwegian pianist and composer.

=== 6 ===
- Harry Andersson, 83, Swedish football player.
- Bruce Andrew, 88, Australian football player.
- David Brodie, 86, Scottish field hockey player and Olympian (1948).
- Fritz Haffer, 82, Romanian Olympic handball player (1936).
- Hall Hibbard, 92, American aerospace engineer.
- Courtney Johnson, 56, American banjo player, lung cancer.
- Vladimír Karfík, 94, Czech architect.
- Kusuo Kitamura, 78, Japanese Olympic swimmer (1932).
- Rajmund Kupareo, 81, Croatian poet.
- Mary Lee, 71, American actress.
- Honoré Martens, 83, Belgian footballer.
- George Davis Snell, 92, American geneticist.
- José María Valverde, 70, Spanish philosopher.

=== 7 ===
- Buddy Blair, 85, American Major League Baseball player (Philadelphia Athletics).
- Percy Edwards, 88, English entertainer and ornithologist.
- Marjorie Gross, 40, Canadian television producer, ovarian cancer.
- David Allan Hubbard, 68, American theologian and professor.
- Fumi Kojima, 79, Japanese track and field athlete and Olympian (1936).
- Tom Puna, 66, New Zealand cricketer.
- John Steele, 87, American Olympic ski jumper (1932).

=== 8 ===
- William J. Baroody, Jr., 58, American government official, lung ailment.
- Gerda Bredgaard, 88, Danish Olympic swimmer (1928).
- Richard Boykin Kellam, 87, American district judge (United States District Court for the Eastern District of Virginia).
- Scoop Putnam, 83, American basketball player.
- Phyllis Stedman, 79, British politician and life peer.
- Henryk Trębicki, 55, Polish weightlifter and Olympian (1964, 1968, 1972).

=== 9 ===
- Rafaela Aparicio, 90, Spanish actress, cerebral hemorrhage.
- Trevor Gowers, 51, Australian rules footballer.
- Daniel Mazia, 83, American cell biologist.
- Salme Reek, 88, Estonian actress.
- Walter Stokes, 98, American Olympic sport shooter (1924).
- Nhiek Tioulong, 87, Cambodian politician.

=== 10 ===
- Aleksandr Abushakhmetov, 41, Russian Olympic fencer (1976, 1980).
- Catullo Ciacci, 62, Italian cyclist.
- Louis Gailliard, 83, French Olympic hurdler (1936).
- Hugh Mitchell, 89, American politician.
- Frankie Sakai, 67, Japanese comedian, actor, and musician.
- Chiyo Uno, 98, Japanese writer, pneumonia.
- Jo Van Fleet, 80, American actress (East of Eden, Cool Hand Luke, The Rose Tattoo), Oscar winner (1956).
- Marie-Louise von Motesiczky, 89, Austrian artist.

=== 11 ===
- Ulysses Dove, 49, American dancer, AIDS-related complications.
- Lonne Elder III, 68, American actor and dramatist.
- George Hees, 85, Canadian politician.
- Brigitte Helm, 88, German actress.
- Wilson W. Wyatt, 90, American politician and lawyer.

=== 12 ===
- Mary Field, 87, American film actress, stroke.
- John Hopper, 73, American politician.
- Annie Ruth Jiagge, 77, Ghanaian jurist and women's rights activist.
- Manibhai J. Patel, 75, Indian politician.
- Lillian Yarbo, 91, American actress.

=== 13 ===
- Edward Dugmore, 81, American artist, cancer.
- Don Ellersick, 58, American football player (Los Angeles Rams).
- Friedrich Geiger, 88, German automobile designer of notably the Mercedes-Benz 300 SL.
- Frank Murdoch, 92, British Olympic sailor (1952).
- Pran Nath, 77, Indian singer, heart failure.
- Keith Palmer, 38, American musician, cancer.
- Al Piechota, 82, American baseball player (Boston Bees/Braves).
- Merceditas Valdés, 73, Cuban singer.

=== 14 ===
- Jónas Ásgeirsson, 75, Icelandic Olympic ski jumper (1948).
- Gesualdo Bufalino, 75, Italian writer, traffic collision.
- Renato Cosentino, 86, Italian Olympic sailor (1936, 1948).
- Noemí Gerstein, 87, Argentine artist and sculptor.
- Alexander Knyazhinsky, 60, Soviet/Russian cinematographer, noted for his work on Andrei Tarkovsky's Stalker.
- Jack Ragland, 82, American Olympic basketball player (1936).
- William F. Roemer Jr., 69, FBI agent and writer.

=== 15 ===
- Sir Fitzroy MacLean, 1st Baronet, 85, Scottish soldier, writer and politician.
- Allenby Chilton, 77, English football player and manager.
- Bernard A. Clarey, 84, United States Navy admiral.
- Ella Fitzgerald, 79, American jazz singer, sometimes referred to as the "First Lady of Song", "Queen of Jazz", and "Lady Ella", stroke.
- Jean Gimpel, 77, French historian and medievalist.
- Dieter Gröning, 63, Polish-born Australian Olympic wrestler (1960).
- Robert Lamoot, 85, Belgian football player.
- Dick Murdoch, 49, American professional wrestler, myocardial infarction.
- Roosseno, 87, Indonesian politician, scholar, and engineer.
- Raymond Salles, 75, French Olympic rower (1952).

=== 16 ===
- Mel Allen, 83, American sports announcer.
- Harold Emerson Foster, 90, American basketball player-coach.
- David Mourão-Ferreira, 69, Portuguese writer and poet.
- Jim Oakes, 84, Australian rules footballer.
- Richard Sylvan, 60, Australian philosopher.
- Adriano Vignoli, 88, Italian road bicycle racer.
- Norm Webb, 75, Australian rules footballer.

=== 17 ===
- George Adomian, 74, American mathematician of Armenian descent.
- Madhukar Dattatraya Deoras, 80, Indian politician and third Sarsanghchalak of the RSS.
- Gizella Farkas, 70, Hungarian table tennis player.
- James Hamilton, 53, British DJ and journalist.
- Doug Harris, 77, New Zealand runner and Olympian (1948).
- Erling Kaas, 80, Norwegian pole vaulter and Olympian (1948, 1952).
- Thomas Kuhn, 73, American historian, physicist and philosopher, lung cancer.
- François Mercier, 79, French footballer.
- Edmond Roudnitska, 91, French perfumer.
- Curt Swan, 76, American comic book artist (Superman).

=== 18 ===
- Florence Andrews, 83, New Zealand fencer.
- Branko Bošnjak, 73, Croatian philosopher.
- Gino Bramieri, 67, Italian actor, pancreatic cancer.
- Bill Brittingham, 72, Australian rules footballer.
- Pierre Chany, 73, French cycling journalist.
- Erika Dannhoff, 86, German actress.
- Miriam Gideon, 89, American composer.
- Glenmor, 64, French protest singer known as Emile Le Scanf.
- Paul Heinemann, 80, Belgian botanist and mycologist.
- Endel Puusepp, 87, Soviet bomber pilot and Hero of the Soviet Union.
- Henry Regnery, 84, American newspaper publisher .
- Rif Rəis uğlı Səyetgərəyev, 35, Russian speedway rider.

=== 19 ===
- Bob Dennison, 82, English football player.
- Frank Eliscu, 83, American sculptor and art teacher.
- Vivian Ellis, 92, British musical composer.
- Eric Fisher, 71, New Zealand cricket player.
- Julius Luipa, 48, Zambian boxer and Olympian (1968, 1972).
- Igor Mirenkov, 27, Soviet-Belarusian serial killer, execution by shooting.
- Hillevi Rombin, 62, Swedish model, aviation accident.
- Gerard David Schine, 68, American politician, plane crash.
- Michel Ter-Pogossian, 71, American physicist.
- Edvin Wide, 100, Swedish middle- and long distance runner and Olympian (1920, 1924, 1928).

=== 20 ===
- Muhammadu Abdullahi Wase, 47-48, Nigerian military officer, Military Administrator of Kano (since 1993), plane crash.
- Renato Archer, 73, Brazilian politician.
- John Buchan, 2nd Baron Tweedsmuir, 84, British peer and son of novelist John Buchan, 1st Baron Tweedsmuir.
- Jeff Gamble, 61, Australian rules footballer.
- Herbert Gerigk, 91, German musicologist.
- Joseph Green, 96, American actor and film director.
- Wálter Guevara, 84, President of Bolivia.
- Irving P. Krick, 89-90, American meteorologist and inventor, heart failure.
- Louis Lefkowitz, 91, American politician, Parkinson's disease.

=== 21 ===
- Doug Bigelow, 67, Australian rules footballer.
- John Wesley Fletcher, 56, American pastor, AIDS-related complications.
- Cyril Holmes, 81, English sprinter and Olympian (1936).
- Reidar Karlsen, 85, Norwegian football player.
- Mary Mead, 61, American politician, fall from horse.

=== 22 ===
- George Barati, 83, American composer and conductor.
- Terrel Bell, 74, American World War II veteran and politician, pulmonary fibrosis.
- Frank Bennett, 73, Canadian ice hockey player (Detroit Red Wings).
- Norvell William Emerson, 58, American politician, member of the United States House of Representatives (1981-), lung cancer.
- Ion Jipa, 71, Romanian Olympic equestrian (1952).
- Epaminondas Samartzidis, 30, Greek Olympic water polo player (1988, 1992), drowning.

=== 23 ===
- Ludovico Avio, 63, Argentine football player.
- Pasqualino De Santis, 69, Italian cinematographer, heart attack.
- Marian Gilman, 81, American Olympic swimmer (1928).
- Ray Lindwall, 74, Australian cricket player.
- Yasapalitha Nanayakkara, 56, Sri Lankan writer.
- Andreas Papandreou, 77, Greek politician, cardiovascular disease.
- Hazel Redick-Smith, 70, South African tennis player.
- Mariano Rojas, 23, Spanish bicycle racer, traffic collision.
- Salah Abu Seif, 81, Egyptian film director.
- Elbert Tuttle, 98, American circuit judge (United States Court of Appeals for the Fifth Circuit).
- Norbertas Vėlius, 58, Lithuanian folklorist specializing in Lithuanian mythology.

=== 24 ===
- Roman Bentz, 76, American football player (New York Yankees, San Francisco 49ers).
- Harry Dowda, 73, American gridiron football player (Washington Redskins, Philadelphia Eagles).
- Grace Ho, 89, Mother of Bruce Lee.
- Edward Halsey Jenison, 88, American politician and newspaper publisher.
- Osman Karabegović, 84, Yugoslav politician.
- Chao Lei, 68, Hong Kong actor, pneumonia.
- Ángel Leyes, 66, Argentine boxer and Olympian (1952).
- Peter Thullen, 88, German mathematician.

=== 25 ===
- Ray Howard-Jones, 93, English painter.
- Vytautas Kavolis, 65, Lithuanian sociologist.
- Arthur Pangman, 90, Canadian Olympic cross-country skier (1932).
- Siegfried Rossner, 82, German Olympic fencer (1952).
- Hans Stam, 77, Dutch Olympic water polo player (1948).

=== 26 ===
- Caleb J. Anderson, 85, Swedish politician.
- Douglas Caston, 78, Canadian politician, member of the House of Commons of Canada (1967-1968).
- Buck Frierson, 78, American baseball player (Cleveland Indians).
- Veronica Guerin, 37, Irish crime reporter, homicide.
- Enrique Heredia, 84, Mexican Olympic cyclist (1932).
- Pedro Montañez, 82, Puerto Rican boxer.
- Zdzisław Nowak, 90, Polish Olympic long jumper (1928).
- J. Lee Rankin, 88, American lawyer and United States Solicitor General.
- Eduard Zahariev, 57, Bulgarian film director and screenwriter.

=== 27 ===
- Peter Adair, 52, American filmmaker and artist, AIDS-related complications.
- Mollie Beattie, 49, American conservationist and director of the United States Fish and Wildlife Service, brain cancer.
- Victor Borg, 80, Norwegian physician, novelist, playwright and script writer.
- Albert R. Broccoli, 87, American film producer (Dr. No, Goldfinger, Chitty Chitty Bang Bang), heart failure.
- Merze Tate, 91, American academic.

=== 28 ===
- Julio Bolbochán, 76, Argentine chess player.
- Ivan Jazbinšek, 81, Yugoslavian football player and Olympian (1948).
- Alfonso Parera, 73, Cuban Olympic weightlifter (1948).
- Ali Said, 69, Indonesian military officer, Chief Justice, and politician.
- Ola Solum, 52, Norwegian film director, cancer.
- Kwan Tak-hing, 91, Hong Kong actor, pancreatic cancer.
- Isao Yamagata, 80, Japanese actor, tuberculosis.

=== 29 ===
- Richard Krebs, 89, German Olympic sprinter (1928).
- Pamela Mason, 80, English actress, screenwriter.
- Bob McIlveen, 77, Australian rules footballer.
- Alexander George Ogston, 85, Australian biochemist.
- Dmitri Pokrovsky, 52, Russian musician and folk music researcher.

=== 30 ===
- Fred Brooks, 88, Australian rules footballer.
- Antonio Franco Florensa, 84, Spanish football player.
- Franz Haupert, 88, Luxembourgian Olympic gymnast (1936).
- Jef Maes, 91, Belgian musician.
- Jerry May, 52, American baseball player (Pittsburgh Pirates, Kansas City Royals, New York Mets), farming accident.
- David McCampbell, 86, United States Navy officer and Medal of Honor recipient.
- Lakis Petropoulos, 63, Greek football player.
