= McIlveen =

McIlveen is a surname. Notable people with the surname include:

- Arthur McIlveen (1886–1979), Australian Salvation Army officer
- Bob McIlveen (1919–1996), Australian rules footballer
- Charles McIlveen (1919–2007), Canadian physician and politician
- Charles A. McIlveen (1910–1972), Canadian politician
- David McIlveen, Northern Irish politician
- Gilbert McIlveen, founding member of the Society of the United Irishmen
- Irish McIlveen (1880–1960), Irish-born American baseball player
- Michelle McIlveen, Northern Irish politician
