= Incremental launch =

Bridge building method

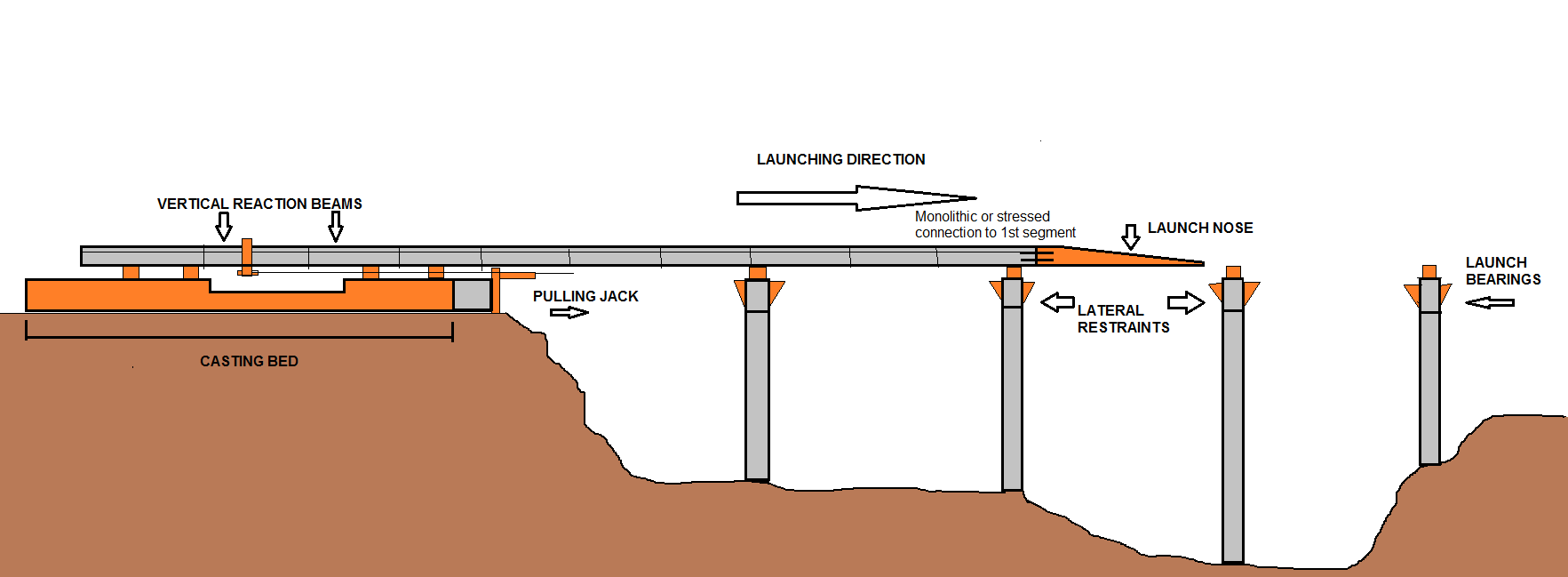
Incremental launch bridge construction

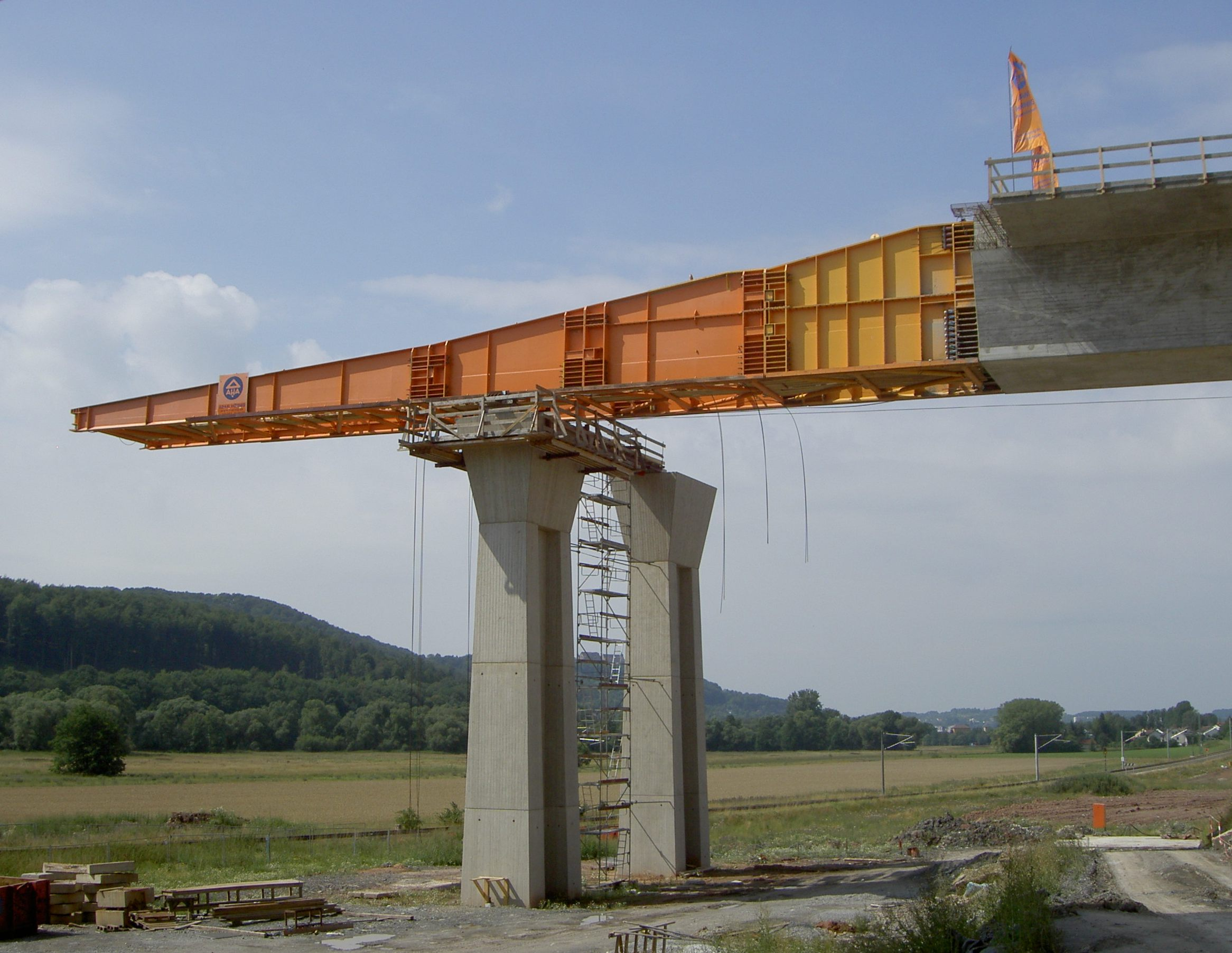
Incrementally-launched bridge construction Itz Valley Bridge near Coburg

Incremental launch is a method in civil engineering of building a complete bridge deck from one abutment of the bridge only, manufacturing the superstructure of the bridge by sections to the other side. In current applications, the method is highly mechanised and uses pre-stressed concrete.

== History ==
The first bridge to have been incrementally launched appears to have been the Waldshut–Koblenz Rhine Bridge, a wrought iron lattice truss railway bridge, completed in 1859. The second incrementally launched bridge was the Rhine Bridge, a railway bridge that spanned the Upper Rhine between Kehl, Germany and Strasbourg, France, completed in 1861 and subsequently destroyed and rebuilt on several occasions.

The first incrementally launched concrete bridge was the 96-metre (315 ft) span box girder bridge over the Caroní River, completed in 1964. The second incrementally launched concrete bridge was over the Inn River, Kufstein in Austria, completed in 1965. The structural engineers for both bridges were Professor Dr Fritz Leonhardt and his partner, Willi Baur.

The usual method of building concrete bridges is the segmental method, one span at a time.

== Method ==
The bridges are mostly of the box girder design and work with straight or constant curve shapes, with a constant radius. 15-to-30-metre (49 to 98 ft) box girder sections of the bridge deck are fabricated at one end of the bridge in factory conditions. Each section is manufactured in around one week.

The first section of the launch, the launching nose, is not made of concrete, but is a stiffened steel plate girder and is around 60% of the length of a bridge span, and reduces the cantilever moment. The sections of bridge deck slide over sliding bearings, which are concrete blocks covered with stainless steel and reinforced elastomeric pads.

== Notable examples ==
The Millau Viaduct

- Katima Mulilo Bridge, 2004
- Redcliffe Bridge, 1986
- Woronora River Bridge, 2001, the largest incrementally-launched bridge when built
- Millau Viaduct, 2004, an example of launching a curved road deck
