= Matric Pass =

Matric Pass is a humorous and satirical play penned by G.C. Tongbra. Written in 1964, it is a drama based on a particular societal trend that permeates throughout in the Manipuri society, that of glorifying the certificate holders of twelfth standard(XII). The book ably and clearly depicts the Manipuri society in the mid 20th century. It tries to grasp the prevalent stereotypes and conceptions of that time. The play revolves around a boy, brought up by his widowed mother, who faces a stiff challenge to produce his 10th class pass certificate to authenticate his false claim. The production of which is required not only to get him married but also get a job, while saving his mother's face.

The book has been on the syllabus for the UPSC Civil Services Examination.

== Plot ==
The play opens in Delhi where Pratap is preparing to compete in the final of lawn-tennis tournament. His highly active romantic life (Womaniser to be precise) involving multiple of girls are exposed one after another while he’s walking through with his partner Kulachandra( a senior to him). Kulachandra come to know that Pratap actually tricked these girls through faked royal identities and is an insolvent. Tongbra picturised Pratap as a highly carefree and ‘damn it’ attitude kind of guy. Pratap apologised to Kulachandra for the defeat and own responsibility for it, for he wasn’t concentrating to the match. He is trying to flee Delhi, for which he even doesn’t have a penny. After some meets here and there with the ladies, he somehow managed to leave Delhi (probably with Kulachandra’s help).

Back home(in Manipur ), Gunabati, pratap’s mother was inappropriately and blindly appreciative of her son. She save none to express her delight at her son’s miraculous metamorphosis from a wasted boy to a promising Matriculate. In the endeavour to maintain her son’s study, she exploited all the available means, ranging from selling household items to credit from all possible sources. The writer even goes on to make the mother borrow watches, bucket from others and put them under mortgage. She is helped by a widower Tomal, who is survived by none. Tomal is an interesting character through which the writer tried to drive home the importance of a married life, a social life. A life of a human without all those responsibilities and familial chores makes one lose the inherent flavor of life.
