= Arthur McIlveen =

Australian Salvation Army officer

Brigadier Sir Arthur William McIlveen, MBE (29 June 1886 – 1 May 1979) was an Australian Salvation Army officer and soldier. McIlveen was born in Brodies Plains, a town near Inverell, in the state of New South Wales. He was the son of a farmer, William McIlveen, and Annie Lucinda, née Lockrey. Leaving school at the age of 14, McIlveen became a tin miner in Tingha, New South Wales.

McIlveen trained as a cadet for the Salvation Army during 1911–12, becoming dux of his session. On 12 January 1916 McIlveen married a fellow Salvation army officer, Elizabeth Mary Mundell, in Richmond. Although he was refused permission to enlist in the Australian Imperial Force for service in the First World War by his superiors, McIlveen disobeyed orders and enlisted on 9 July 1918. While he was traveling to Britain the war ended and he was discharged in January 1919. After the war, McIlveen was appointed to Dubbo by the Salvation Army, assisting those suffering from the Spanish Influenza. After his departure in 1921, he worked in various country towns in New South Wales, and also in Sydney, Melbourne and Toowoomba. McIlveen was promoted to brigadier in 1938.

Following the outbreak of the Second World War, McIlveen joined the 18th Brigade of the Second Australian Imperial Force on 26 February 1940 as a welfare officer. Reaching Egypt in December 1940, he became an unofficial padre to many of the other brigades serving in the Middle East and was known for playing phonographs in the battlefield. After returning to Australia in March 1942 he became the Salvation Army's secretary for prison-work until his retirement on 29 June 1951.

For his services towards the Salvation Army McIlveen was appointed a Member of the Order of the British Empire in 1961, awarded the Order of the Founder in 1967 and was knighted in 1970. McIlveen was the subject of a television documentary screened by the Australian Broadcasting Commission on 24 April 1977. He died in the Concord Repatriation General Hospital on 1 May 1979 and was buried with full military honours in Woronora. In his honour a Salvation Army research center and museum at Bexley North was named after him.
