= Woronora River Bridge =

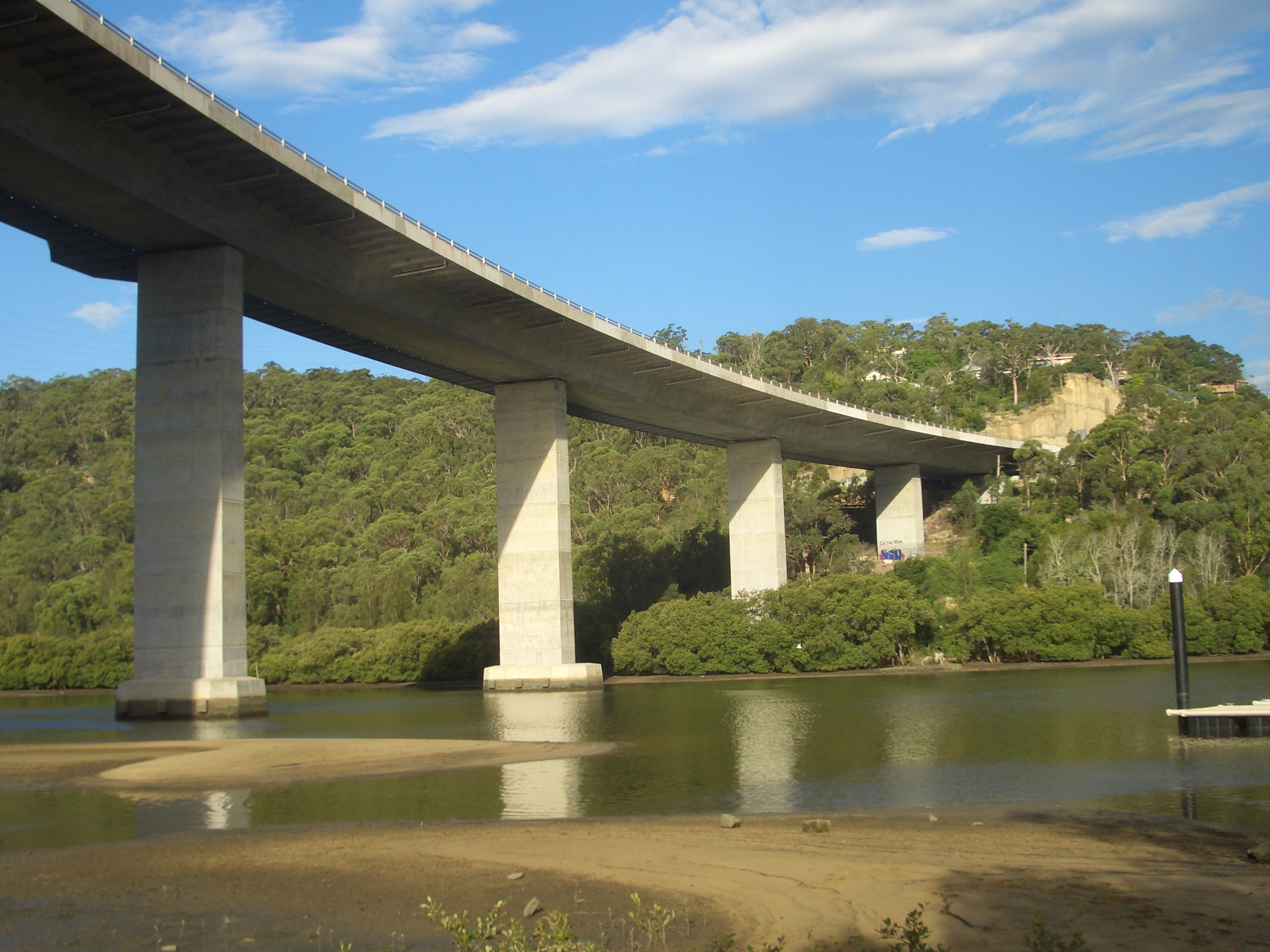
- Woronora River Bridge, view towards Sutherland
- Coordinates: 34°01′10″S 151°02′57″E
- Carries: River Road: Motor vehicles; Pedestrians; Bicycles
- Crosses: Woronora River
- Locale: Woronora, New South Wales, Australia
- Begins: Woronora
- Ends: Sutherland
- Other name(s): Woronora Bridge
- Maintained by: Transport for NSW
- Preceded by: Low-level Woronora Bridge
- Followed by: Como railway bridge

Characteristics
- Design: Incremental launched box girder with suspended deck
- Material: Prestressed concrete
- Pier construction: Reinforced concrete
- Total length: 521 metres (1,709 ft)
- Width: 19.6 to 26.605 metres (64 to 87 ft)
- Height: 36 metres (118 ft)
- Longest span: 58.7 metres (193 ft)
- No. of spans: 10
- Piers in water: 4
- No. of lanes: 4

History
- Constructed by: Barclay Mowlem
- Construction end: February 2001
- Construction cost: $44.8 million
- Replaces: Two-lane low-level Woronora Bridge (1981; concurrent use)

The Woronora River Bridge, also known as Woronora Bridge, is a four-lane road bridge that carries River Road across the Woronora River at Woronora, in Southern Sydney, New South Wales, Australia. The bridge, at the time of its completion in 2001, was the largest incrementally launched bridge in the Southern Hemisphere with horizontal and vertical curves.

== Description ==
The Woronora Bridge was built to eliminate the steep grades and hairpin bends on the previous route between the southern Sydney suburbs of Sutherland and Bangor. It was completed in 2001 and replaced the two-lane low level Woronora Bridge which opened in 1981, which in turn had replaced a 1912 single-lane timber bridge. The low level bridge remains in use for local traffic.

There is a grade-separated shared pedestrian footpath and cycleway on the northern side of the bridge, located just underneath the road. It can be accessed from Menai Road on the Bangor side and Prince Edward Park Road or River Road on the Sutherland side of the river.

The bridge's design was recognised with the Australian Construction Achievement Award in 2002. With a downhill grade of 4.7% at the launching abutment, it has one of the steepest downhill launchings of any incrementally launched bridge.

== Gallery ==
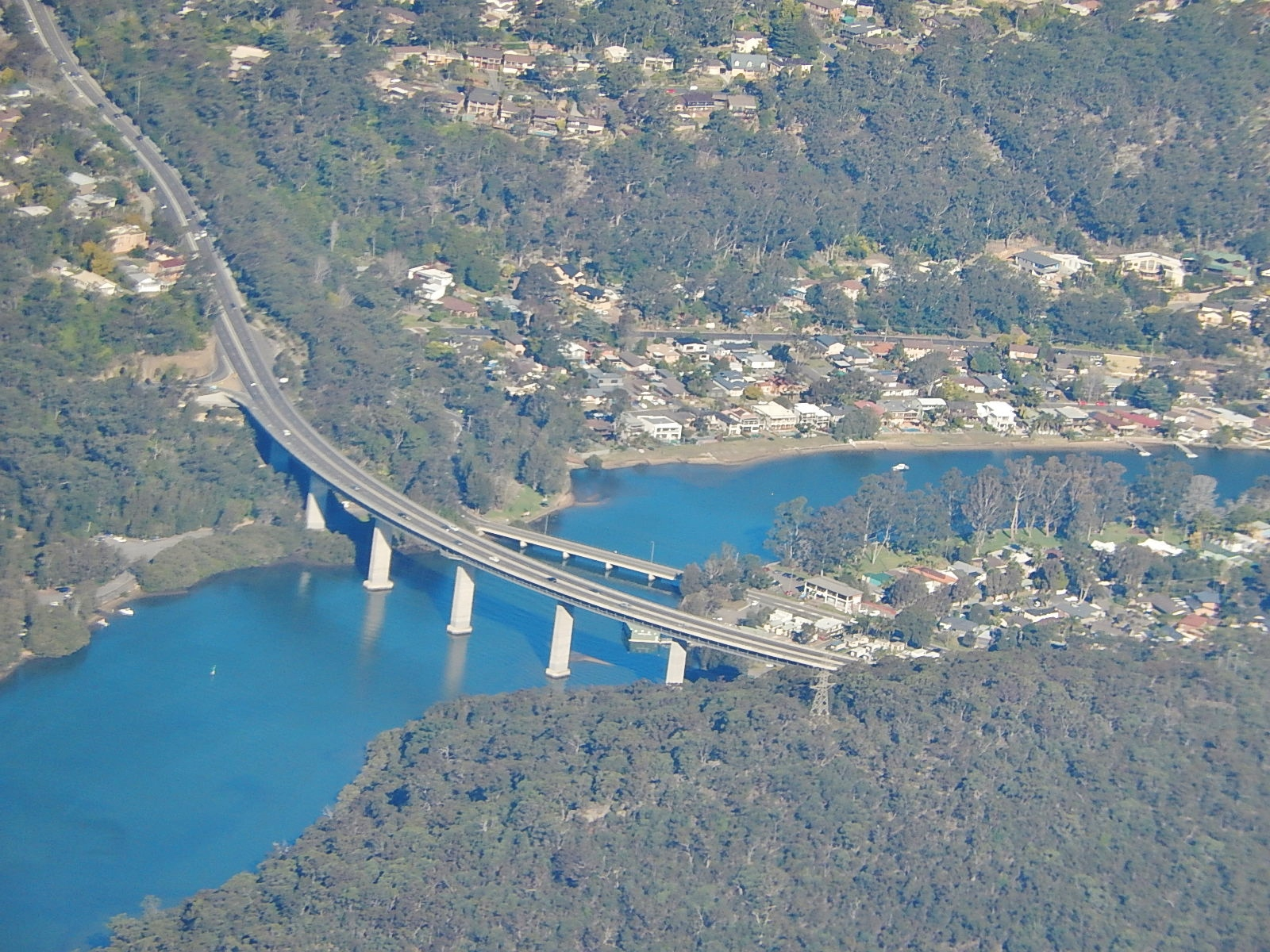
Aerial view of the low and high level bridges

== See also ==
- List of bridges in Sydney
