= Woronora River =

River in New South Wales

Woronora
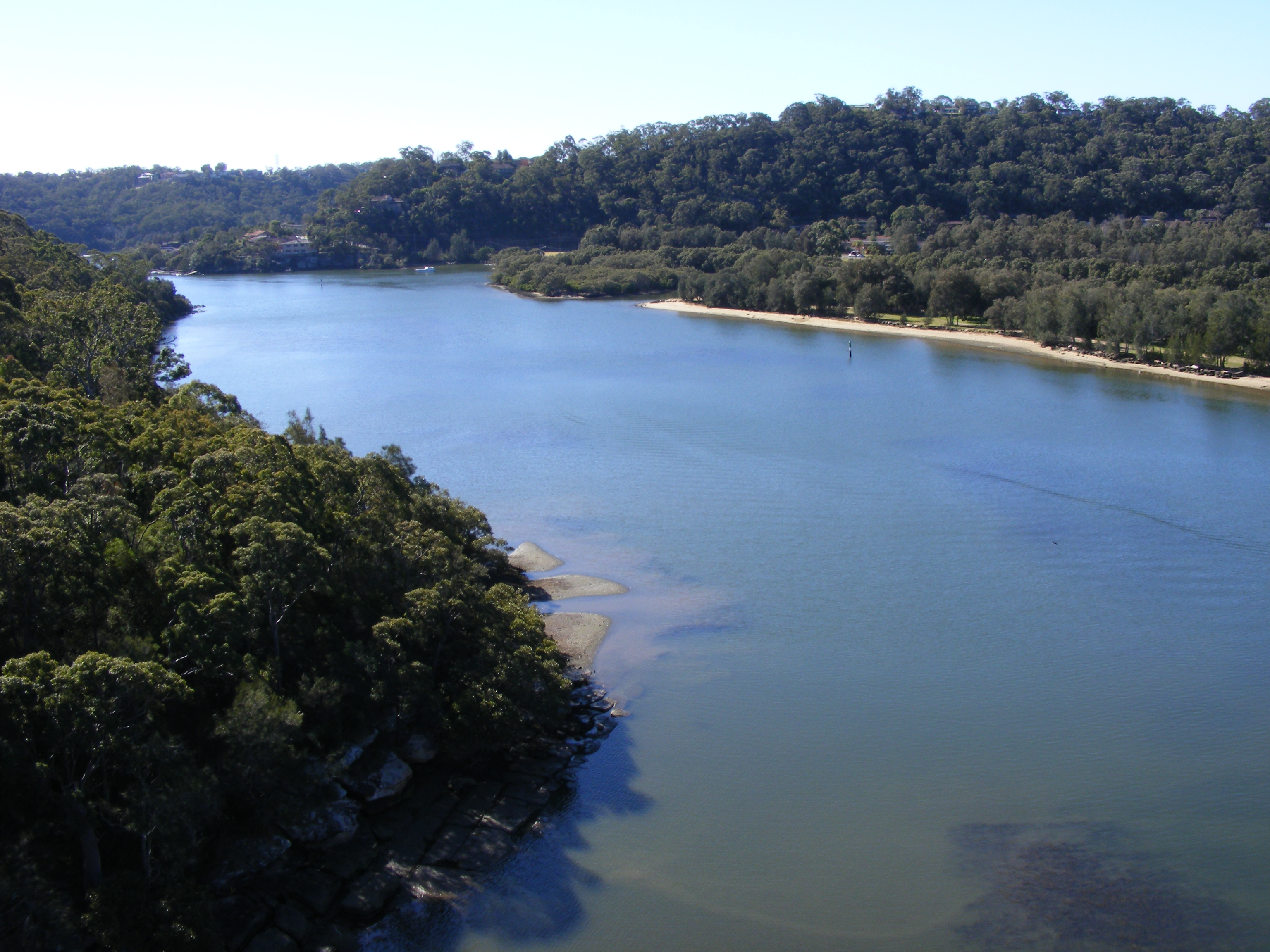
- Woronora River

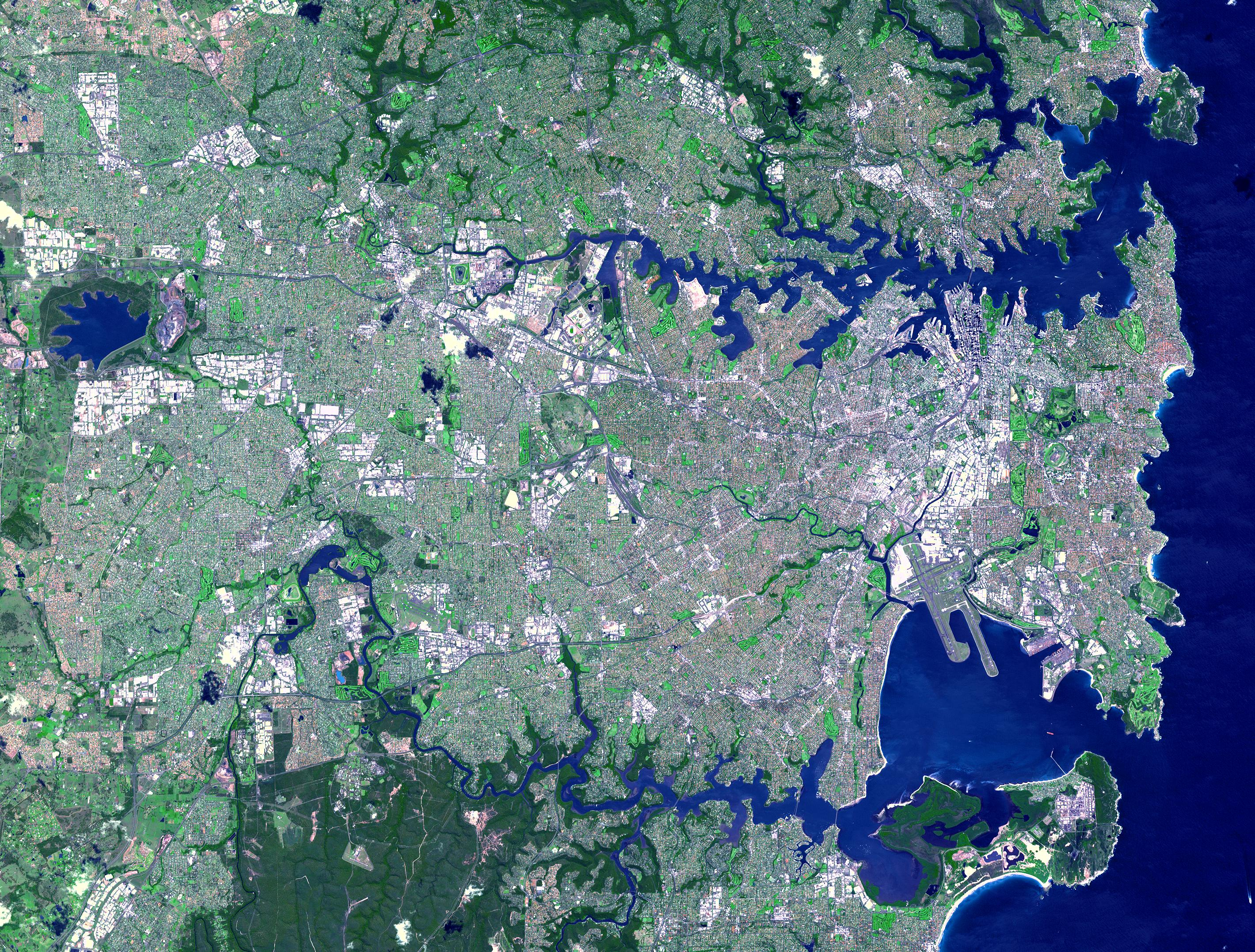
- NASA satellite view of Greater Metropolitan Sydney, with the location of the mouth of the Woronora River, as marked
- Etymology: Aboriginal (Dharug): "black rocks"

Location
- Country: Australia
- State: New South Wales
- Region: Greater Metropolitan Sydney
- LGA: Sutherland Shire

Physical characteristics
- Source: Illawarra escarpment
- 2nd source: Waratah Rivulet
  - location: near Darkes Forest
  - coordinates: 34°23′17″S 150°54′18″E
  - elevation: 353 m (1,158 ft)
- Mouth: confluence with the Georges River
  - location: between Como and Illawong
  - coordinates: 33°59′40″S 151°4′3″E
  - elevation: 0 m (0 ft)
- Length: 36 km (22 mi)
- Basin size: 174 km^{2} (67 sq mi)

Basin features
- River system: Georges River catchment
- Tributaries
  - left: Still Creek (New South Wales)
  - right: Heathcote Creek, Forbes Creek (New South Wales)
- Dam: Woronora (1941)

The Woronora River is a perennial river of the Sydney Basin, located in the Sutherland Shire local government area of Greater Metropolitan Sydney, approximately 22 kilometres (14 mi) south of the Sydney central business district, in New South Wales, Australia.

'Woronora' is an Aboriginal place name. Records show the spelling of the name has varied since it first appeared in the 19th century, the earliest being Wooloonora (Dixon, 1827, quoted in Walker 1974:66, followed by Wolonora (Dixon, 1837, and Woronora Mitchell, 1835). The name was first applied to the Woronora River, a tributary of the Georges River, before being given to an electoral district, a local road east of the river, and finally the suburb itself.

The Woronora River rises on the northwestern slopes of the Illawarra escarpment and has its origin from Waratah Rivulet, near Darkes Forest, and flows generally north for approximately 36 kilometres (22 mi), joined by three minor tributaries, before reaching its confluence with the Georges River, between Como and Illawong.

== Location and features ==
It has its origin from Waratah Rivulet, near Darkes Forest, and flows generally north for approximately 36 kilometres (22 mi), joined by three minor tributaries, before reaching its confluence with the Georges River, between Como and Illawong. The total catchment area of the river is approximately 174 square kilometres (67 sq mi) and the area is generally administered by the Sydney Catchment Authority in its upper reaches and the Sutherland Shire Council in its lower reaches. Much of the course of the river is through the Dharawal State Conservation Area, Heathcote National Park and the Royal National Park as it descends 354 metres (1,161 ft) from source to mouth.

The river is impounded by the Woronora Dam, opened in 1941. The 71,790-megalitre (2,535×10^{6} cu ft) impoundment is Lake Woronora, formed to augment water supply for southern Sydney and the northern Illawarra region.

The Woronora River is traversed by high level and low level road bridges and a footbridge in the suburb of Woronora. A road bridge on Heathcote Road, linking Heathcote and Holsworthy also provides a crossing over the river. At the area known as "The Needles", near Woronora Road in Engadine, a footbridge links the suburb to Barden Ridge. "The Needles" is considered the "head of navigation" where there is relatively deep water with pointed vertical rocks, mostly just below the surface, hence the name. Until 2008, there was a vehicle causeway there at an area called the Pass of Sabugal, so named by Major Mitchell who surveyed the route in 1843 for what would become part of Old Illawarra Road. The causeway was modified in 2008 to allow the passage of fish and so is now unsuitable for vehicular traffic but still suitable for pedestrians or cyclists. The Needles area is downstream of Heathcote Rd bridge by about 3.4 km. Just above the Heathcote Rd bridge was "Woronora Wier" which was demolished pre-1994 and the roadside parking area removed for safety reasons.

== Etymology ==
In the Australian Aboriginal Dharug language the river draws its name, meaning "black rocks". 'Woronora' is an Aboriginal place name. Records show the spelling of the name has varied since it first appeared in the 19th century, the earliest being Wooloonora (Dixon, 1827, quoted in Walker 1974:66, followed by Wolonora (Dixon, 1837, and Woronora Mitchell, 1835). The name was first applied to the Woronora River, a tributary of the Georges River, before being given to an electoral district, a local road east of the river, and finally the suburb itself.

== Gallery ==
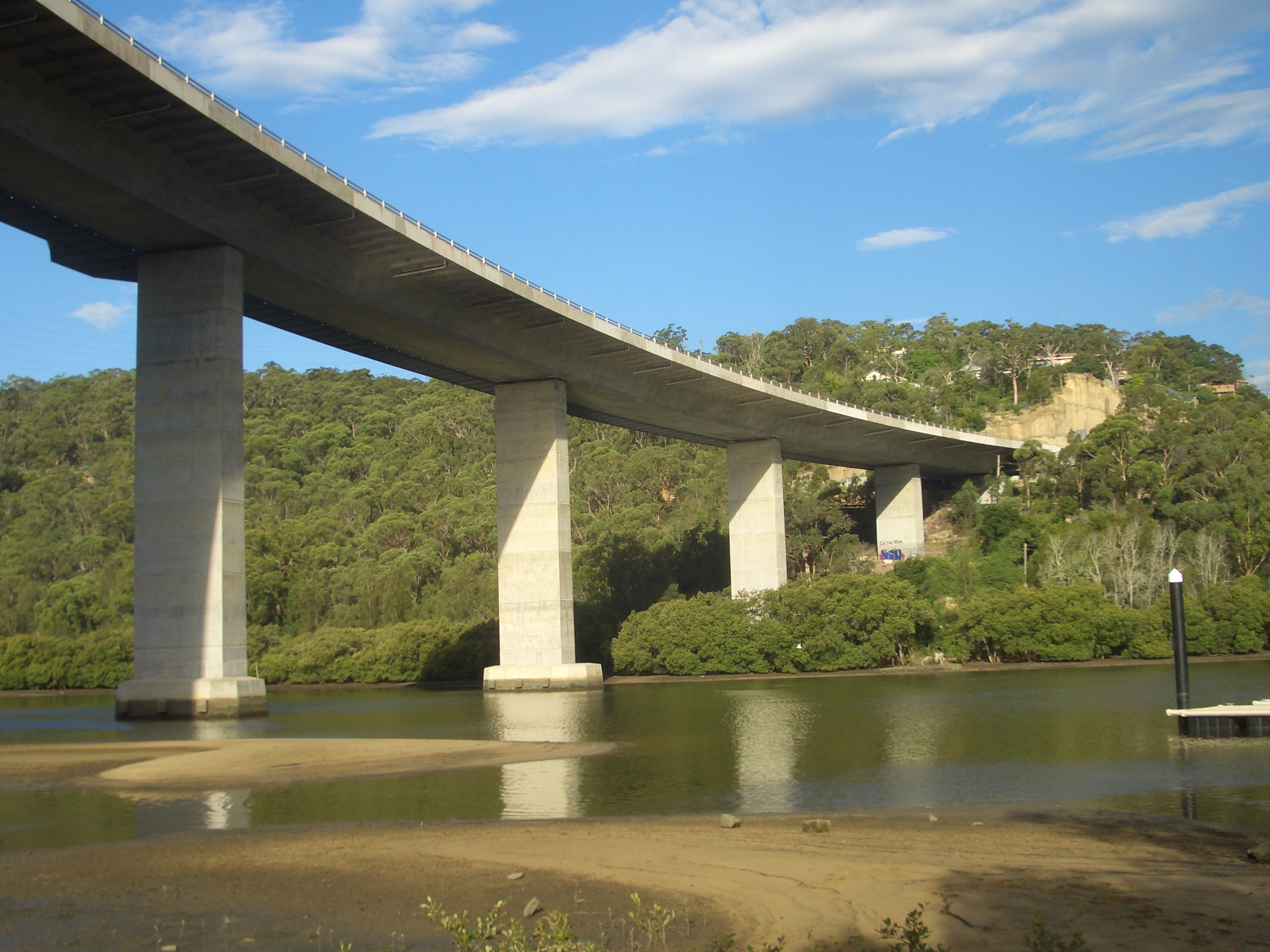
Woronora River Bridge, view towards Sutherland

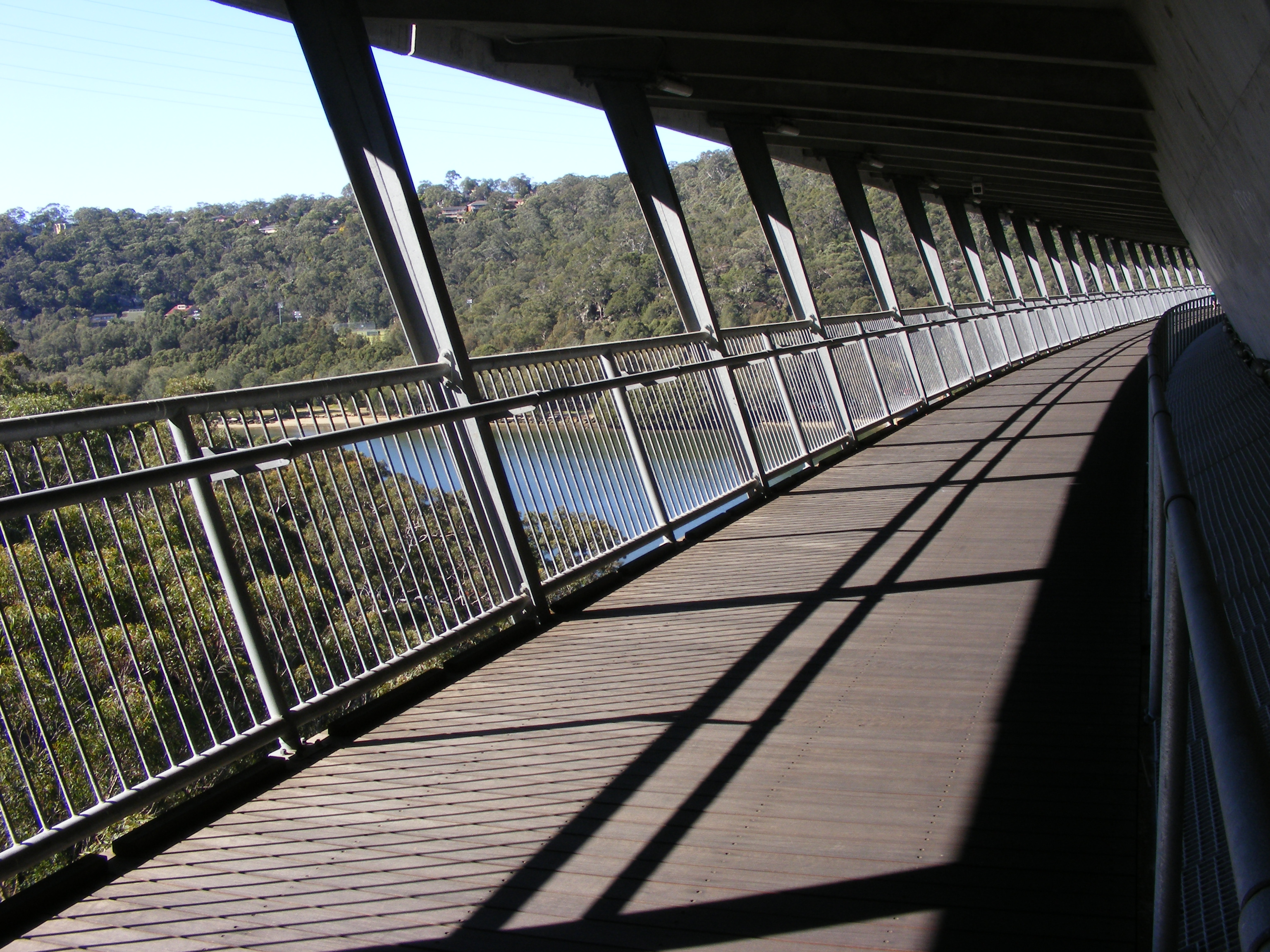
Woronora River Bridge walkway.

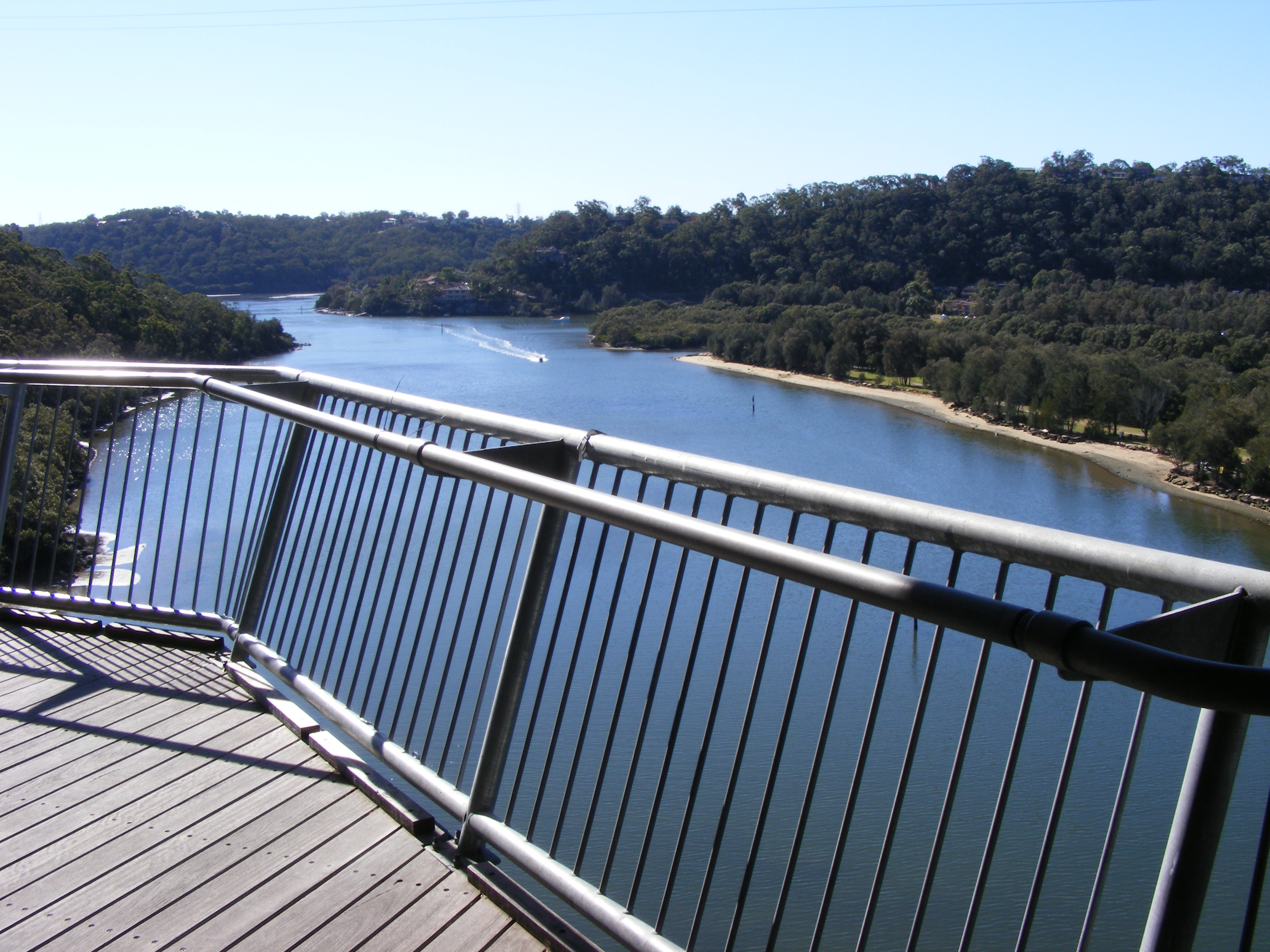

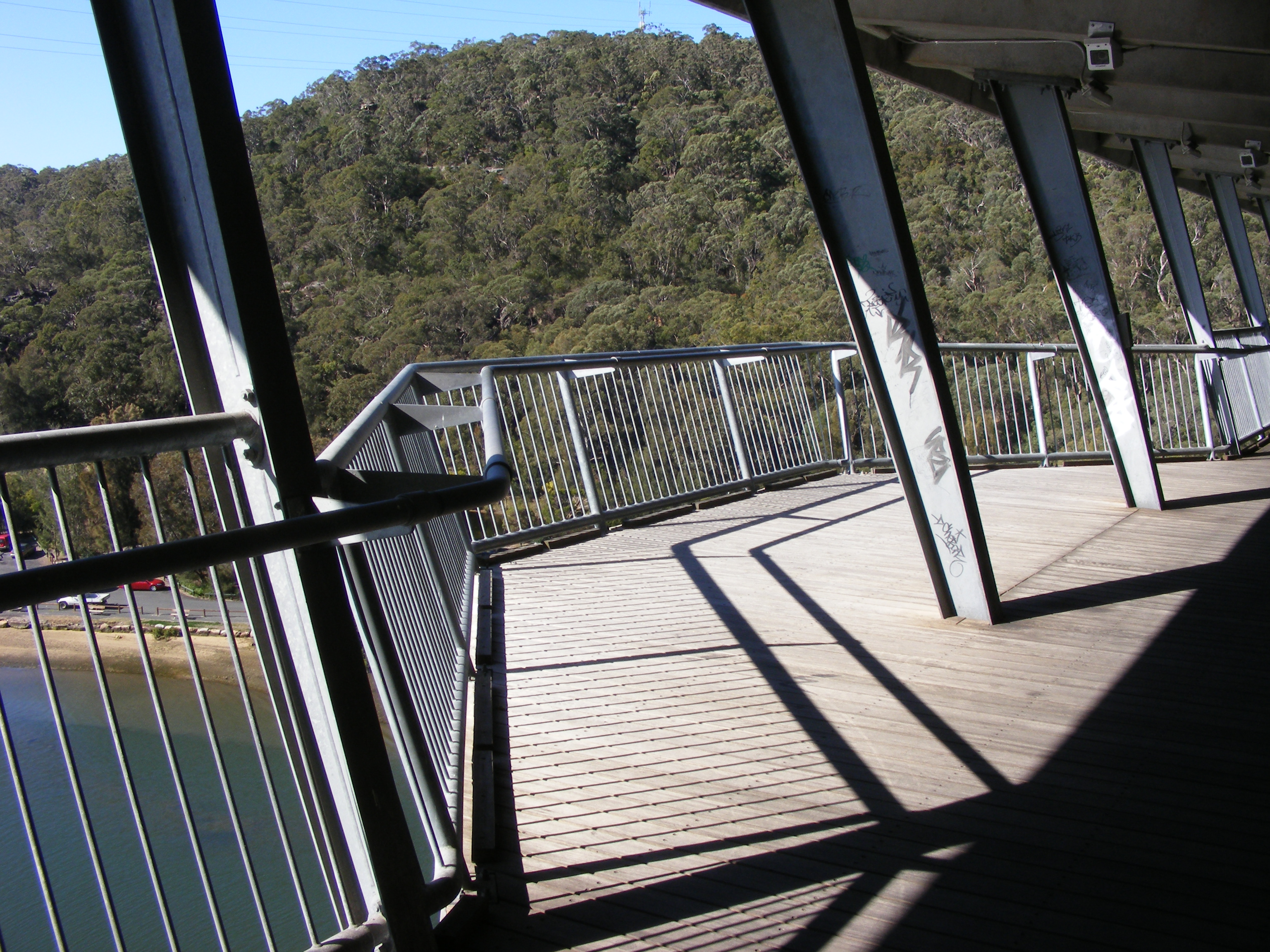

== See also ==
- List of rivers of New South Wales (L–Z)
- Rivers of New South Wales
