= Fred Brooks (footballer) =

Australian rules footballer, born 1908

Personal information
- Full name: Frederick Henry Brooks
- Born: 5 May 1908
- Died: 30 June 1996 (aged 88)
- Original team: Teacher's Training College

Playing career^{1}
| Years | Club | Games (Goals) |
| 1931 | Carlton | 2 (0) |
- ^{1} Playing statistics correct to the end of 1931.

Frederick Henry Brooks (5 May 1908 – 30 June 1996) was an Australian rules footballer who played with Carlton in the Victorian Football League (VFL). Brooks later played for and coached Williamstown. In six seasons with 'Town, he missed just one game, with influenza in 1933, and totalled 111 games and 3 goals from 1932 to 1937. Brooks was captain-coach in 1935, won the Club best and fairest and tied for the VFA Medal. He was runner-up in the Club best and fairest in 1936 and 1937. Brooks received life membership for his six seasons of service and is a member of the WFC Hall of Fame.
