= Fritz Haffer =

Romanian handball player (1914 1996)

Personal information
- Full name: Friedrich "Fritz" Haffer
- Nationality: Romania
- Born: 26 May 1914 Sibiu, Kingdom of Romania
- Died: 6 June 1996 (aged 82) United States

Sport
- Sport: Handball

Senior clubs
- Years: Team
- ?-?: Hermannstädter Turnverein
National team
Years	Team	Apps
?-?	Romania	3
- Updated on Caps and goals only during the 1936 Summer Olympics

Friedrich "Fritz" Haffer (26 May 1914 6 June 1996) was a Romanian male handball player. He was a member of the Romania men's national handball team. He was a part of the team at the 1936 Summer Olympics. On club level he played for Hermannstädter Turnverein in Romania.

Haffer was the brother of handball player Karl Haffer who was also part of the national team at the 1936 Summer Olympics.
