= Woronora =

- Suburb
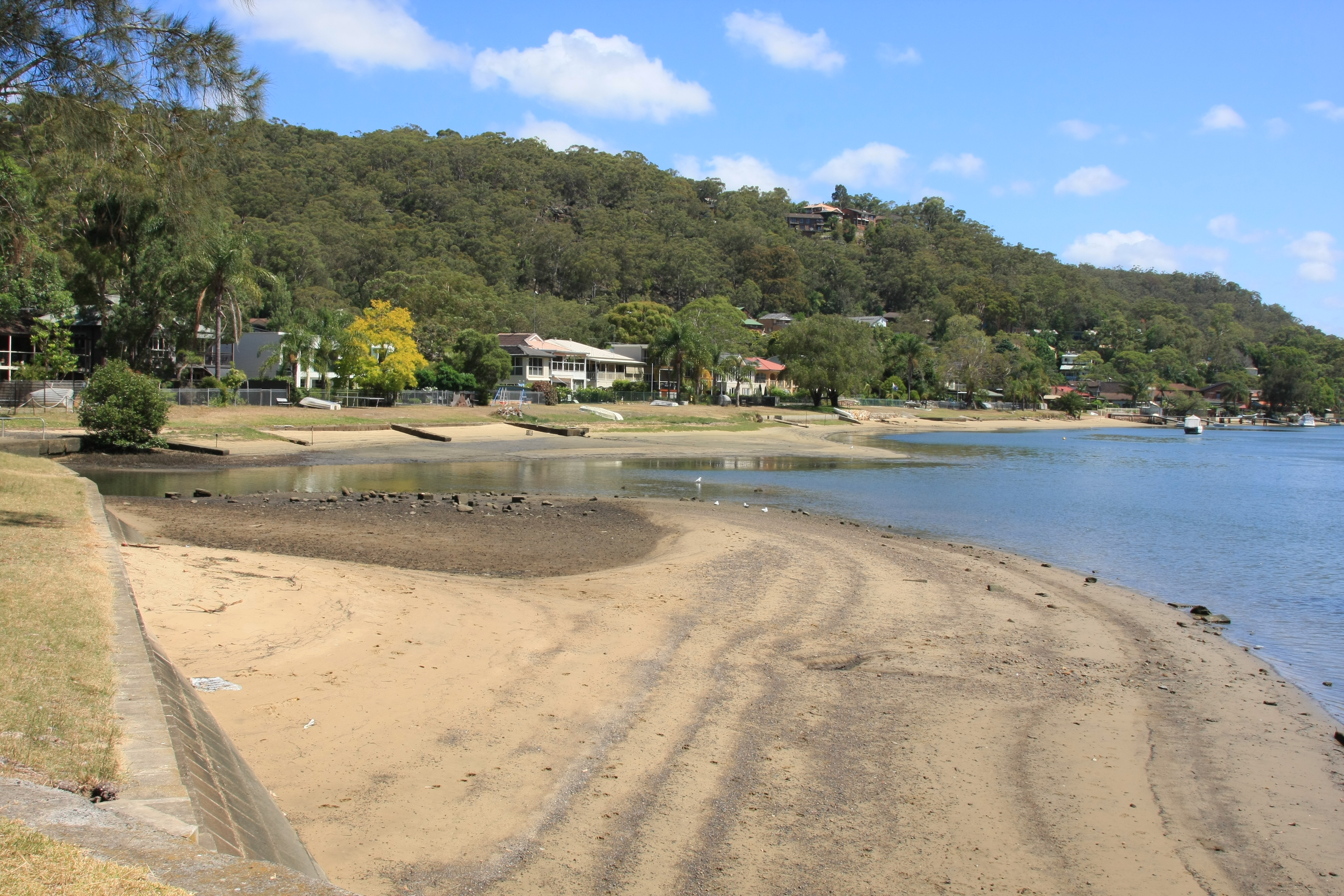
- Woronora, on the banks of the Woronora River

- Interactive map of Woronora
- Country: Australia
- State: New South Wales
- City: Sydney
- LGA: Sutherland Shire
- Location: 27 km (17 mi) from Sydney CBD

Government
  - State electorate: Heathcote
  - Federal division: Hughes
- Elevation: 8 m (26 ft)

Population
  - Total: 2,043 (2021 census)
- Postcode: 2232
Suburbs around Woronora
Bangor	Bonnet Bay	Jannali
Bangor	Woronora	Sutherland
Woronora Heights	Woronora Heights	Sutherland

Woronora is a suburb in southern Sydney, in the state of New South Wales, Australia. Woronora is located 27 kilometres south of the Sydney central business district, in the local government area of the Sutherland Shire. Woronora Heights is a separate suburb, to the south-west.

== Placename history ==
'Woronora' is an Aboriginal placename. Records show the spelling of the name has varied since it first appeared in the 19th century, the earliest being Wooloonora (Dixon, 1827, quoted in Walker 1974:66), followed by Wolonora (Dixon, 1837), and Woronora (Mitchell, 1835). The name was first applied to the Woronora River, a tributary of the Georges River, before being given to a hundred, an electoral district, a local road east of the river, and finally the suburb itself.

The following meanings have been suggested for Woronora:

- 'black rock' (Appleton and Appleton 1992)
- 'black rocks' (Walker 1974; Neve 1970)
- 'river-of-no-sharks' (Bolton 2000)

Variations such as 'black cliffs' and 'sharkless waters' have also been suggested by local residents.

The Aboriginal language known variously as Dharug, Eora or simply 'the Sydney Language' was spoken around Woronora at the time of colonisation (Troy 1994:61). Lists of Dharug words gathered around the turn of the century provide a number of possibilities regarding the number of morphemes and likely constituents of the placename. An analysis of the number of syllables in Dharug words recorded by Mathews (1901) shows over 50% contained two syllables, and just under 40% contained three, while only 1.45% contained one syllable:

syllables	1	2	3	4	5	TOTAL
no. words	4	139	109	23	1	276
% of total	1.45%	50.37%	39.49%	8.33%	0.36%	100%

It therefore seems likely that Woronora is made up of two disyllabic elements.

In light of what historical Dharug information is available, the meaning of the suffix of Woronora seems most transparent. A range of phonetically similar words are present in the sources:

- ngurra 'camp' (Troy 1994:67; Stockton 1993:156; Mathews 1901:158)
- nura 'place or country' (Troy 1993:83)
- ngurang 'place' (Troy 1993:78)
- ora 'a place or country e.g. Woronora' (Kohen 1993:16)
- 'place; gno-rang, no-rar' (Kohen 1990:238)

We may tentatively conclude therefore that *-ngurra could function as a locative suffix in Dharug.

The stem of Woronora is much harder to specify. Unfortunately, no word list contains a word *wooloo, *wolo, or *woro, but the following orthographically similar words are present:

- wal-lan 'rain' (Ridley 1875:105; Kohen 1993:224), wulan 'rain' (Troy 1993:71)
- wolora 'wallaroo' (Mathews 1901:158), wularu 'wallaroo' (Troy 1993:52), wolaru 'kangaroo (mountain)' (Ridley 1875:104)
- wurral 'slow' (Mathews 1901:159)
- warra 'breast' (Troy 1993:34)
- wural 'bashful, ashamed' (Troy 1993:66)
- wala 'then' (Troy 1993:79)
- wurra 'mouse, rat' (Troy 1994:69)

Oft-cited definitions like 'black rocks' find no support in the written records. Words for 'black', 'shark' and 'water' do not resemble any element of Woronora, though we lack a record for the Dharug words for 'rock', 'cliff', 'river', and 'creek', and thus cannot categorically rule these out.

Guesses regarding the original form of the placename depend largely upon the degree of mishearing assumed to have taken place between the Aboriginal informant and the European recorder. Might a surveyor have missed a syllable in *wolaru-ngurra? Although English speakers frequently reproduced trilled rhotics as either /r/ or /l/ orthographically (Donaldson 2002:235), it is difficult to establish whether the name was misheard from Aboriginal sources three times (producing the Wooloo-, Wolo-, and Woro- variants), or whether the change in spelling was a product of changing European pronunciation without reference to Aboriginal people. The latter is quite likely considering that until the 1840s, and possibly beyond, it was the only official placename from the mouth of the river southwards (Dixon 1841), and thus must have been written and pronounced frequently in reference to a large area.

Assuming therefore that the original placename most closely resembled Wooloonora, and acknowledging the inadequacy of our records due to language loss, three potential definitions present themselves:

- *wulan-ngurra 'rain place'
- *wolaru-ngurra 'wallaroo place'
- *wala-ngurra 'then place'

Cultural information could be the deciding factor in defining Woronora. Was there a Rain or Wallaroo Dreaming in this part of Sydney? Could reported dialogue of the Dreamtime ancestors make sense of 'then place'? Or was there another noun unknown to us relating to black rock/s? Unfortunately the consequences of colonisation for the Dharug people in terms of land loss, dispersal and language loss mean this will probably never be known.

== Geography ==
The residential area of Woronora lines both sides of the Woronora River. The Woronora River Bridge is northern limit to residential housing. A footbridge crosses the river at the southernmost limit of housing on the western bank. The housing on the eastern bank continues beyond the end of Prince Edward Park Road, and some houses can only be reached by a walking track or by boat.

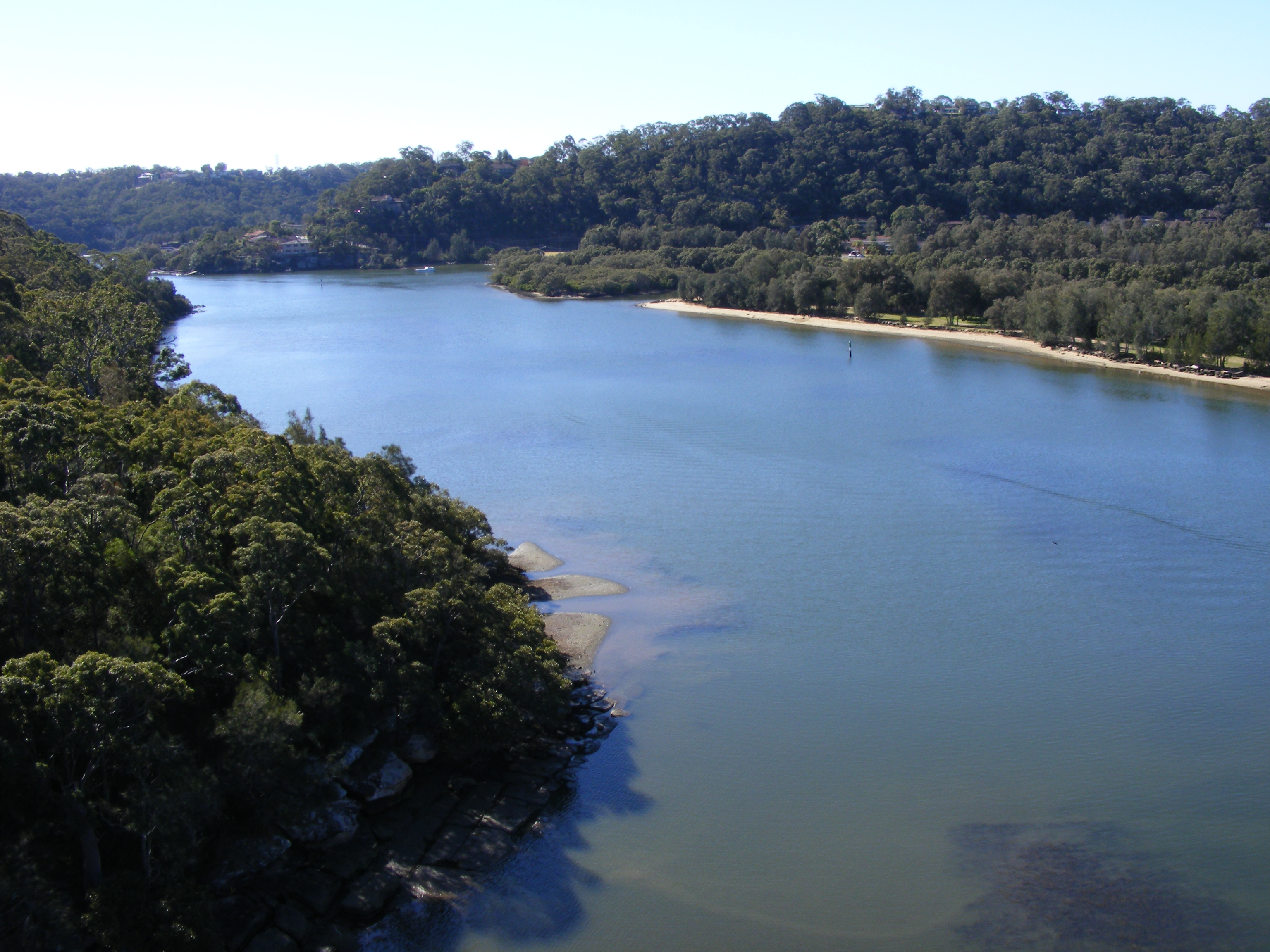
Woronora River

The suburb is completely ringed by bushland, with only a single road providing access. Many think that this adds to the charm of the suburb which has curiously escaped the development that its surrounding suburbs have experienced. They feel that this has contributed to the sense of community in Woronora.

The Woronora River is tidal at this point. River levels and water quality at Woronora can be affected by the release of water from the Woronora Dam upstream from the suburb.

Woronora Plateau, is a geographical region adjacent to the Sydney Plain. Slightly higher in altitude, it is capped with Hawkesbury Sandstone. The Woronora River flows through the deeply dissected plateau to the Georges River from near the sources of the Port Hacking, within the Sutherland Shire.

== Population ==
In the 2021 Census, there were 2,043 people in Woronora. 81.8% of people were born in Australia. The next most common country of birth was England at 4.9%. 91.2% of people spoke only English at home. The most common responses for religion were No Religion 36.1%, Catholic 28.0% and Anglican 16.2%.

== Transport ==
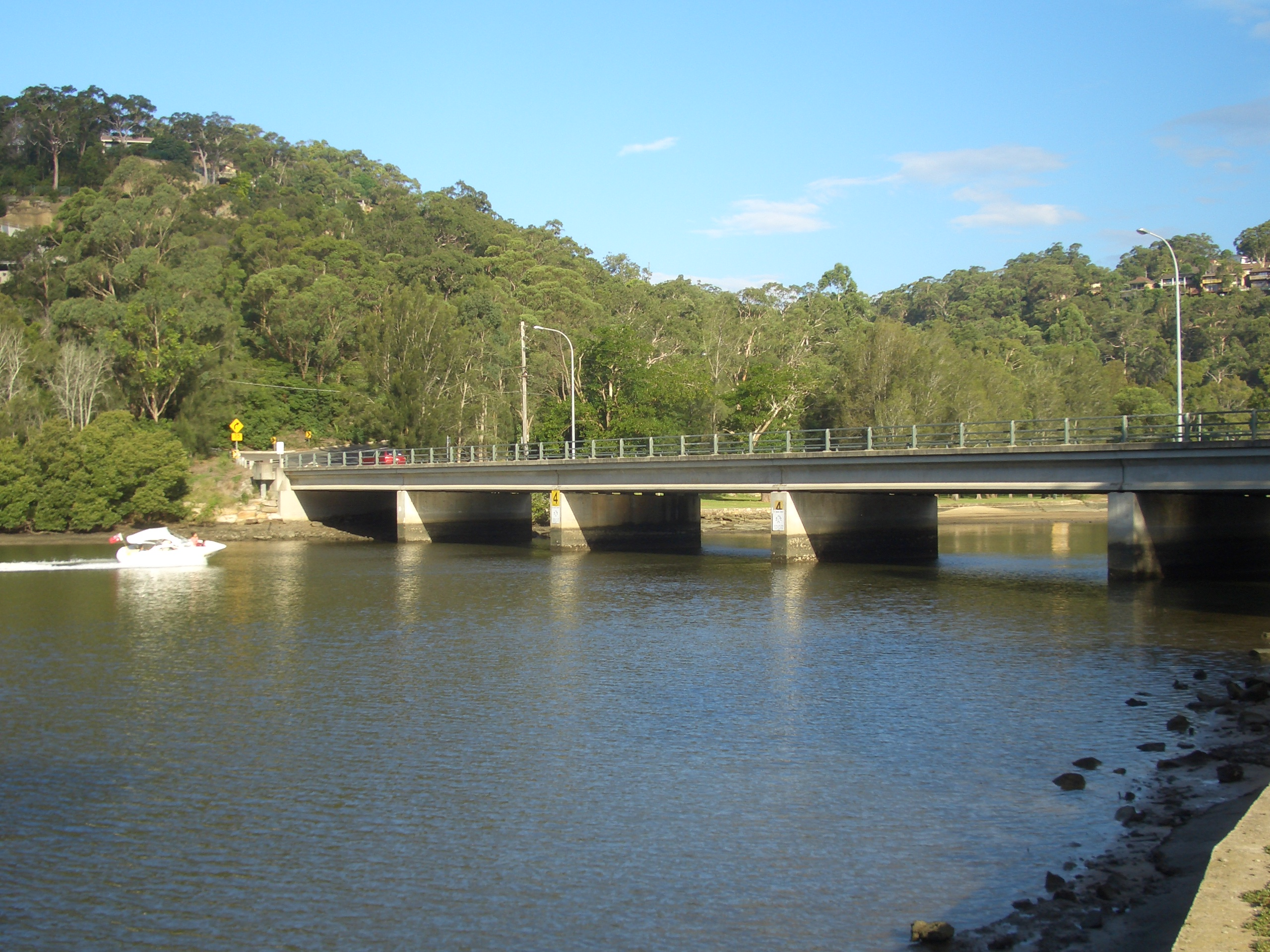
Old Woronora Bridge

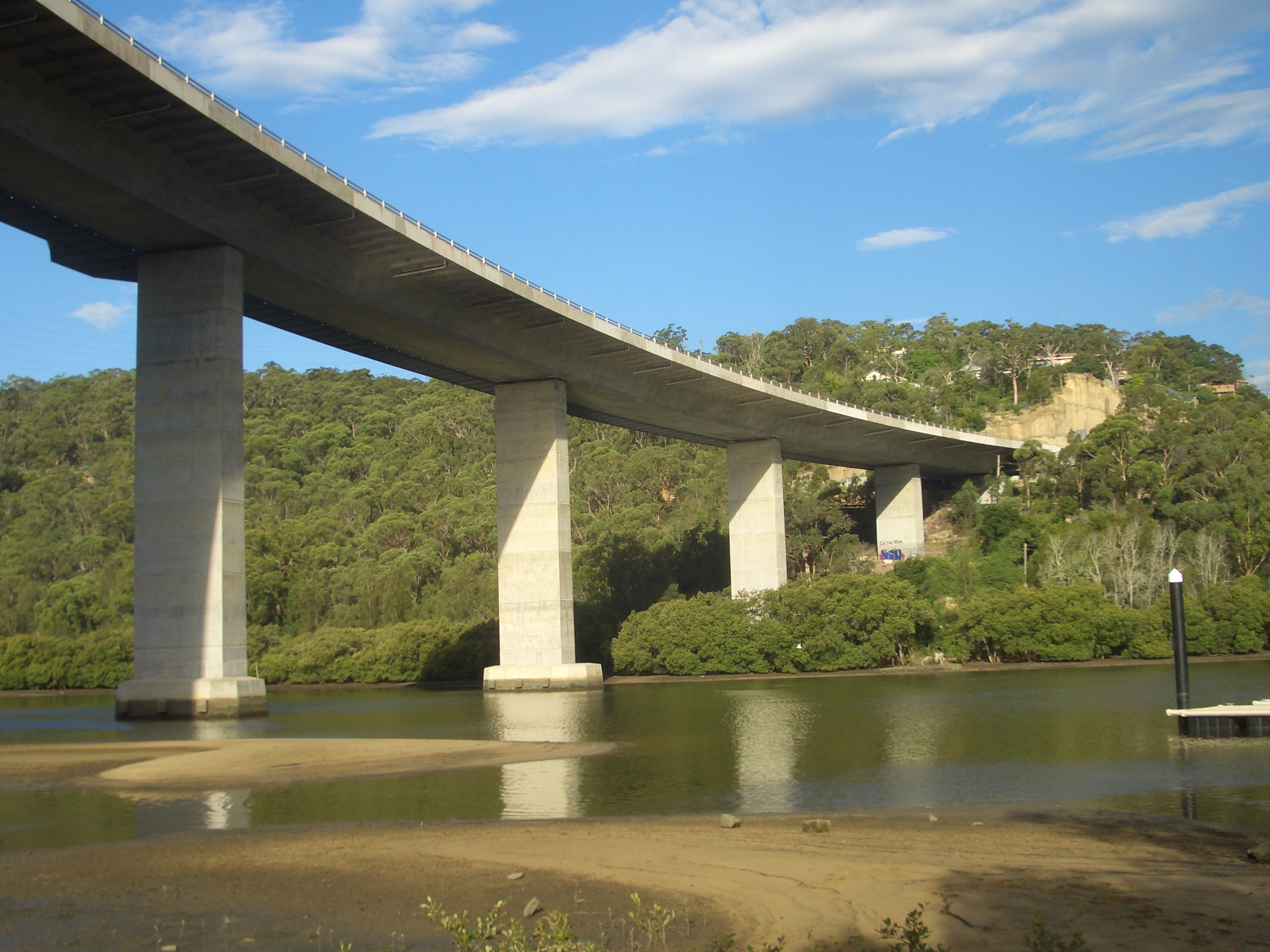
Woronora Bridge, view towards Sutherland

The Woronora Bridge was built to eliminate the steep descents and ascents for traffic between Sutherland and Menai. The bridge is approximately 600 metres long and was completed in 2001 as an alternative to the Old Woronora Bridge. There is a public path located just underneath the road on the bridge shared between bicycle and pedestrians. The path can be accessed from Menai Road on the Bangor side and Prince Edward Park Road or River Road on the Sutherland side.

== Woronora Fire Trail ==
There is a fire trail between Woronora and Woronora Heights that is closed to all vehicles. It is accessible to pedestrians, cyclists and for emergency access. It has remained closed due to protests from those who live in Woronora and parts of Woronora Heights concerned that if the fire trail was opened to general transport, it would create an influx of vehicles from Engadine using Woronora as a 'shortcut' to Menai and Sutherland. They feel it would congest and change the character of the small suburb. In 2006, Frank Sartor, a member for the NSW State Government intervened and zoned the fire trail such that it would not be able to be used for public or general transport. Up until this decision, many houses through the area displayed placards protesting against members of the local Sutherland Shire Council that were pushing to have the road opened to public transport, and others that sought to see the road opened to general traffic.

== Features and facilities ==
Woronora features an RSL Club, boatshed, rugby league football oval (which is also a cricket ground in summer), caravan park, primary school which opened in 1942, cafe, restaurant (riverside), a fire station, hairdresser, bottle shop, general store and the Sutherland Region Guides Hall, situated by the Woronora River. It is also home to the only floating fire station in Australia to provide for residents which do not have road access.

Prince Edward Park is situated between the Woronora River and Sutherland. Along the river, a cleared area was created as a recreational park, with facilities for boating and fishing. It is also the location for the Sutherland Region Girl Guides canoeing facility, 1st Woronora River Scout Group and the Woronora Life Saving Club. Going towards Sutherland, the park is dense bushland, with some walking trails.

Similar to the adjoining suburbs of Bonnet Bay (where the streets are named after American Presidents) and Woronora Heights (where most streets are named after birds), Woronora has a notable street naming pattern. The majority of streets have river or water related names.

On the east side of the Woronora River there is a collection of streets named after rivers in the United Kingdom and Ireland.

Street Name	River
Tay Place	River Tay (the longest river in Scotland)
Severn Road	River Severn (the longest river in Great Britain)
Wye Close	River Wye (fourth longest river in the UK)
Mersey Street	River Mersey (a UK major river from Liverpool to south of Manchester)
Liffey Place	River Liffey (an Irish river that flows through the centre of Dublin)
Thames Street	River Thames (longest river in England and flows through London)

On the west side of the Woronora River there is collection of streets which are named after Australian rural towns or waterways derived from Aboriginal language words. The Aboriginal language names often include a reference to rivers or water. These include Manilla Place, Boomi Place, Yanko Close and Nundah Place.

Woronora is home to many native fauna and there are frequent sightings of Koalas (in the upper cemetery region). During 2020 a seal was seen for many weeks living on the Woronora Fire Brigade Pontoon. In December 2024 a Playptus was spotted in Woronora exiting and reentering the river.

== Gallery ==
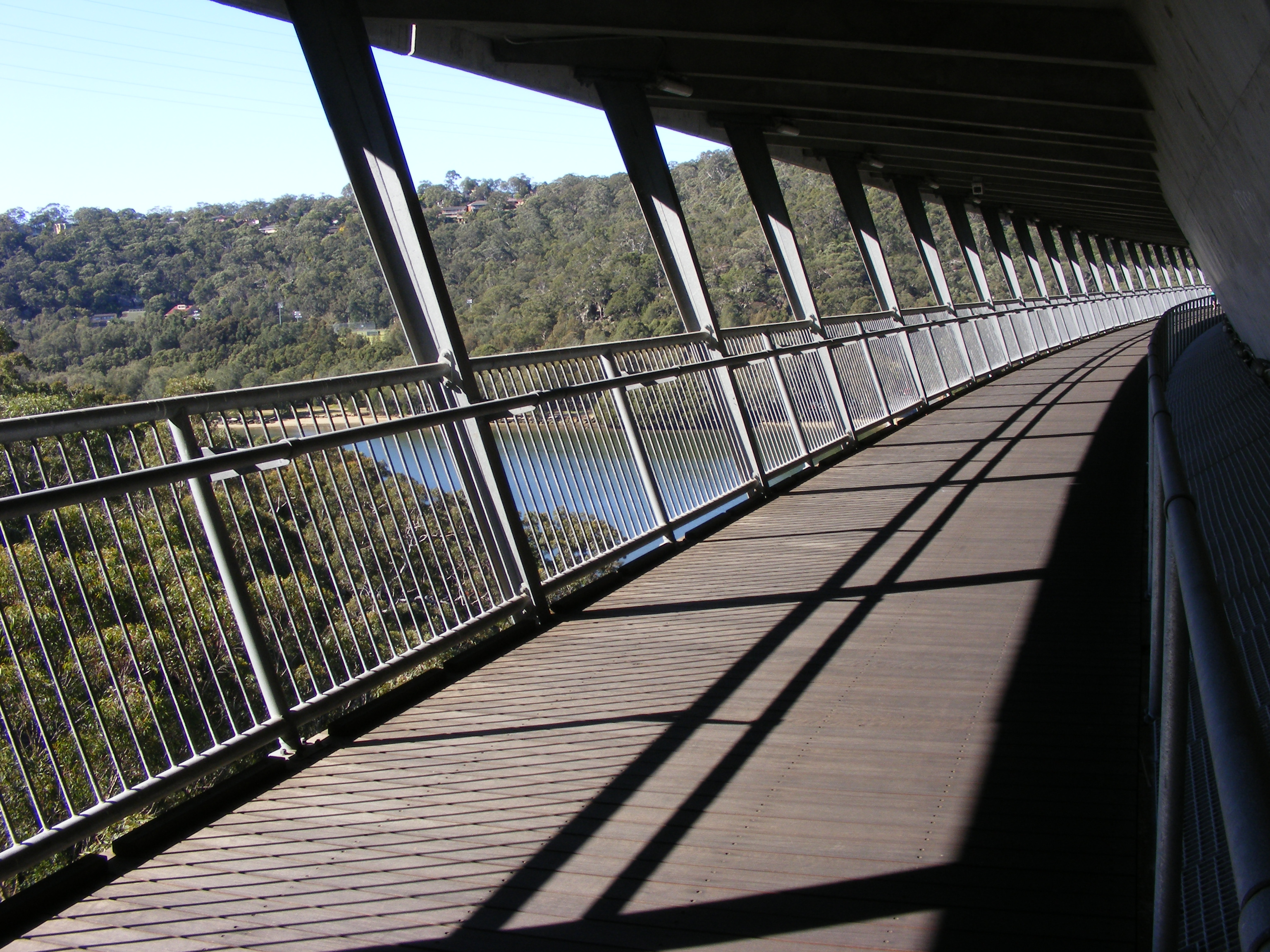
The Woronora Bridge walkway.

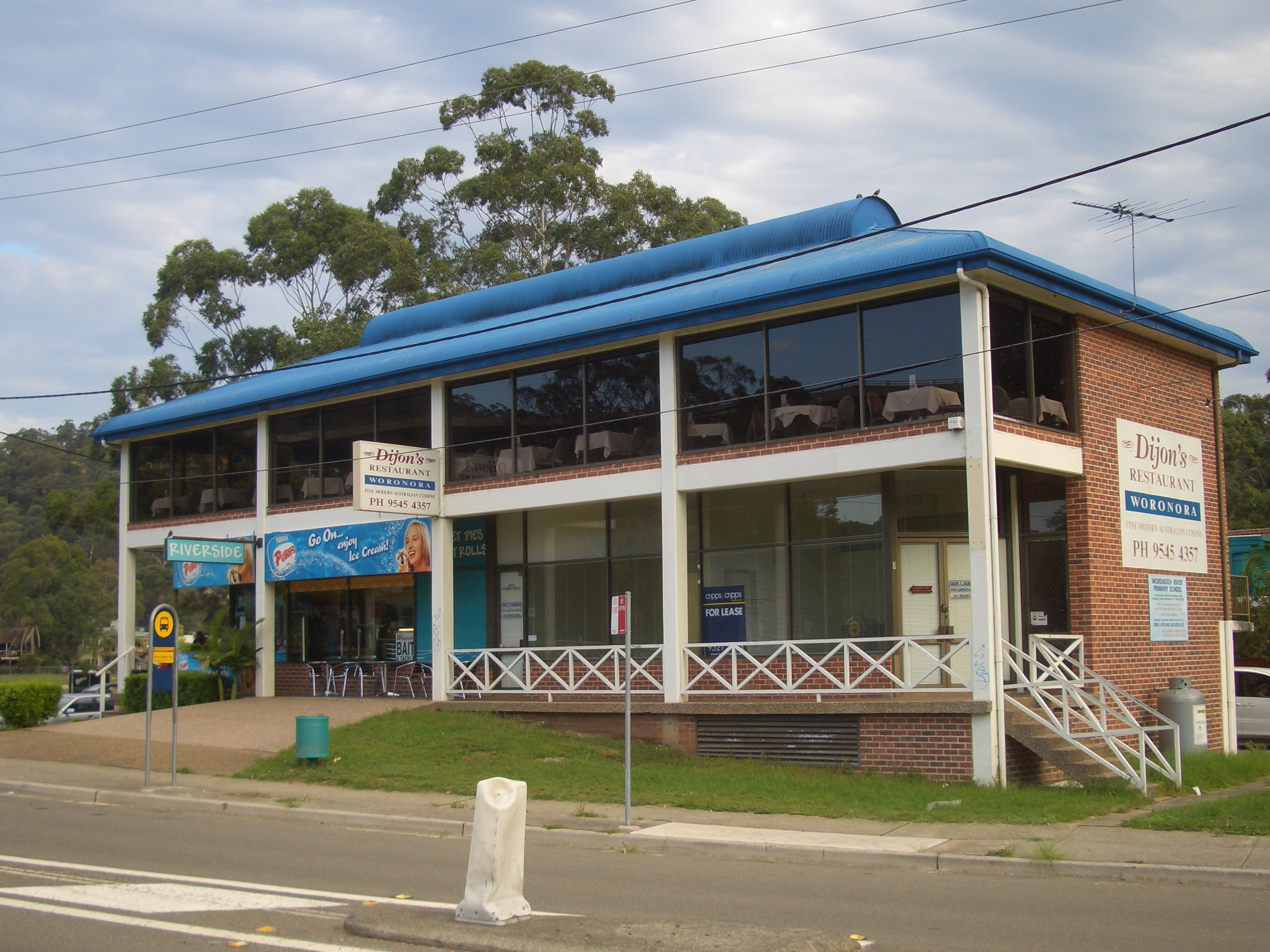
Menai Road, Woronora

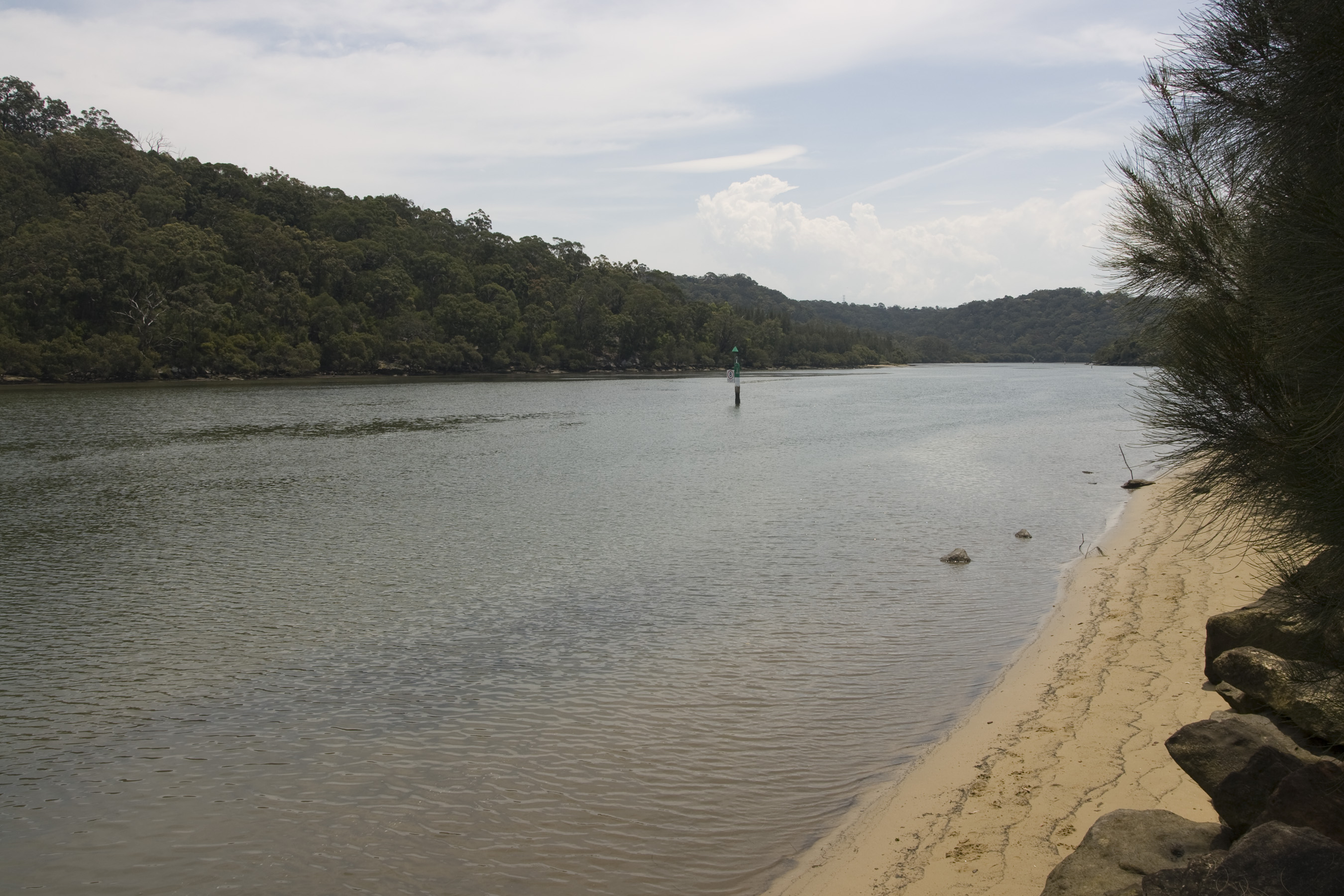
Woronora NSW 2232, Australia – Panorama #1

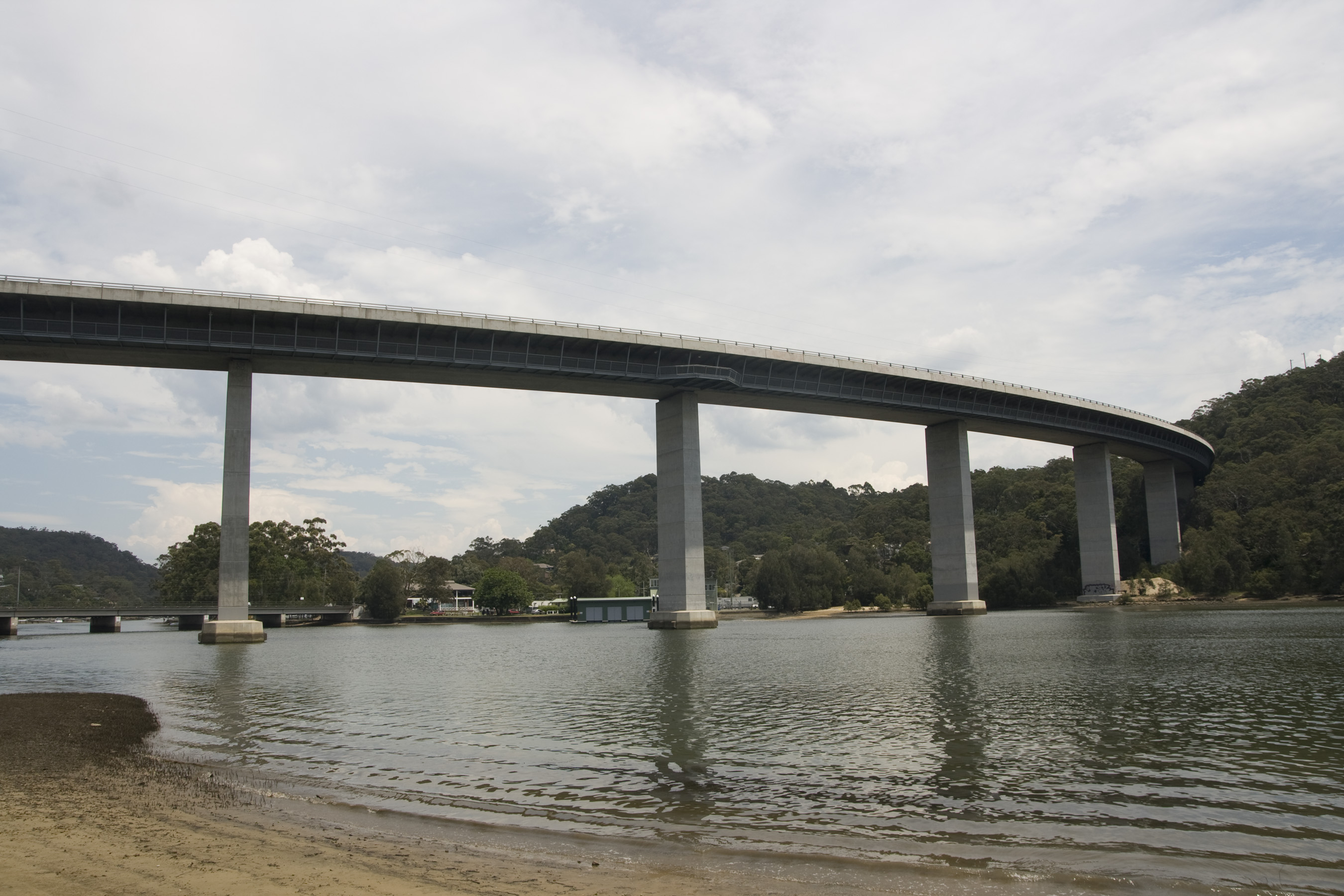
Woronora NSW 2232, Australia – Panorama #2

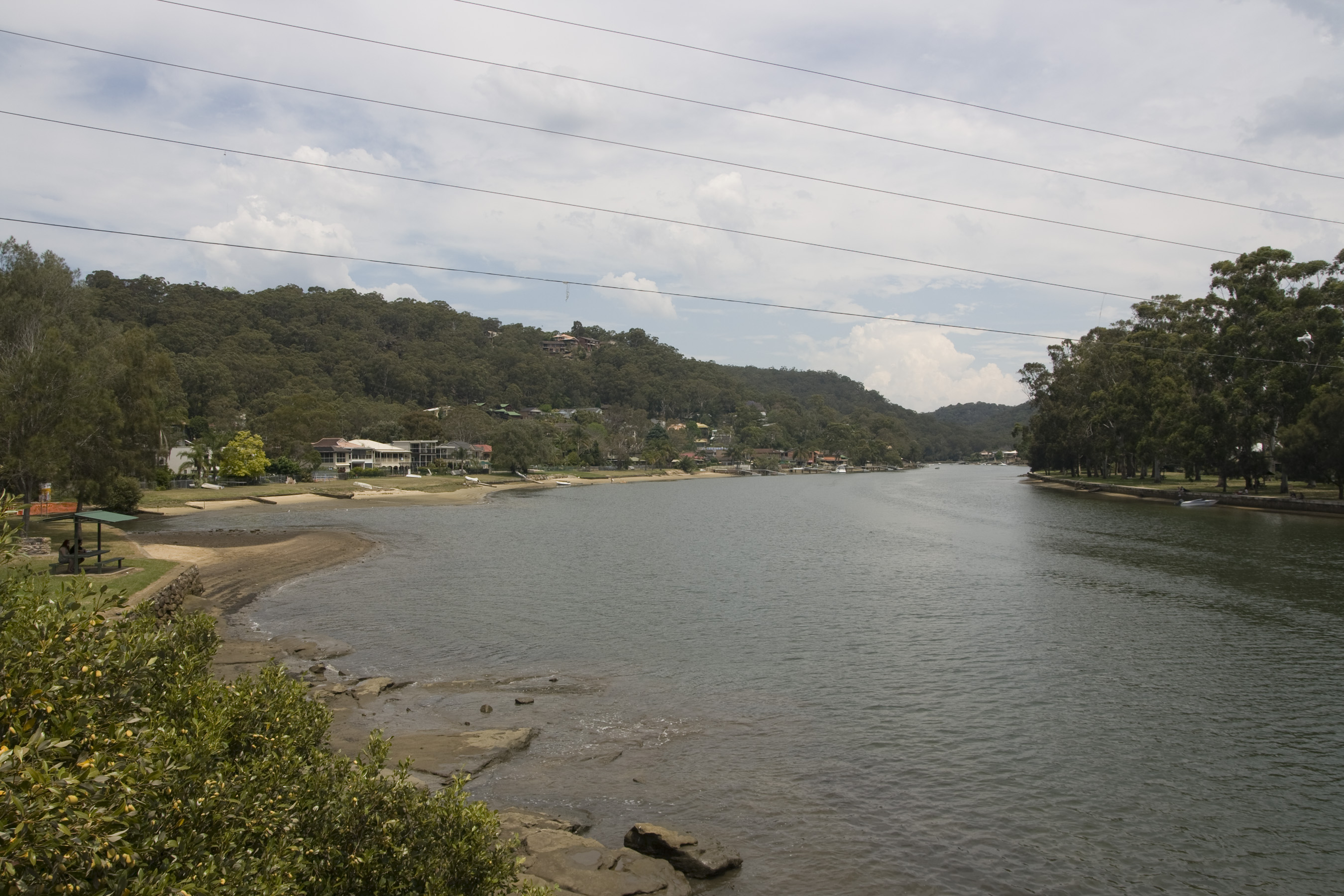
Woronora NSW 2232, Australia – Panorama #3

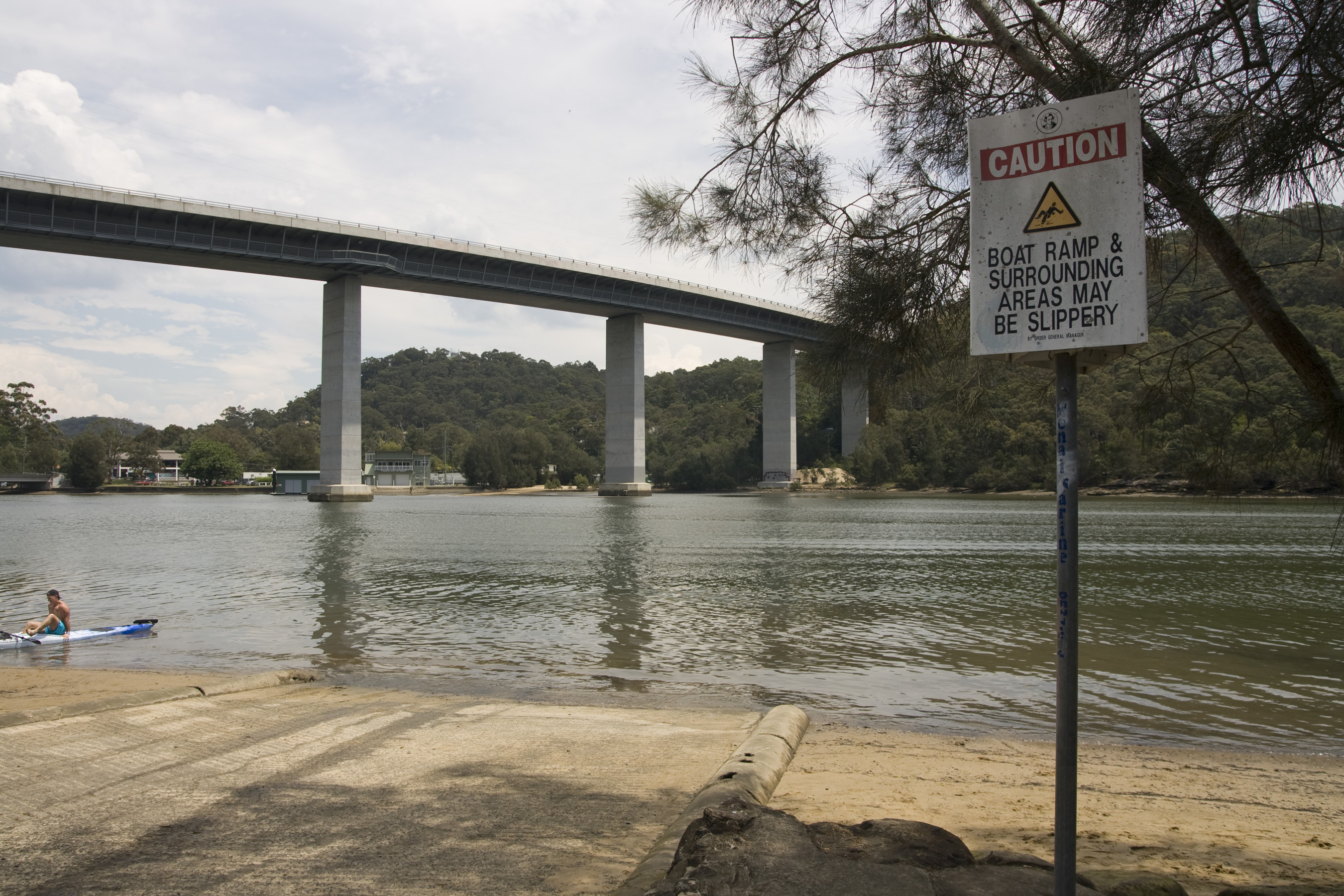
Woronora NSW 2232, Australia – Panorama #4

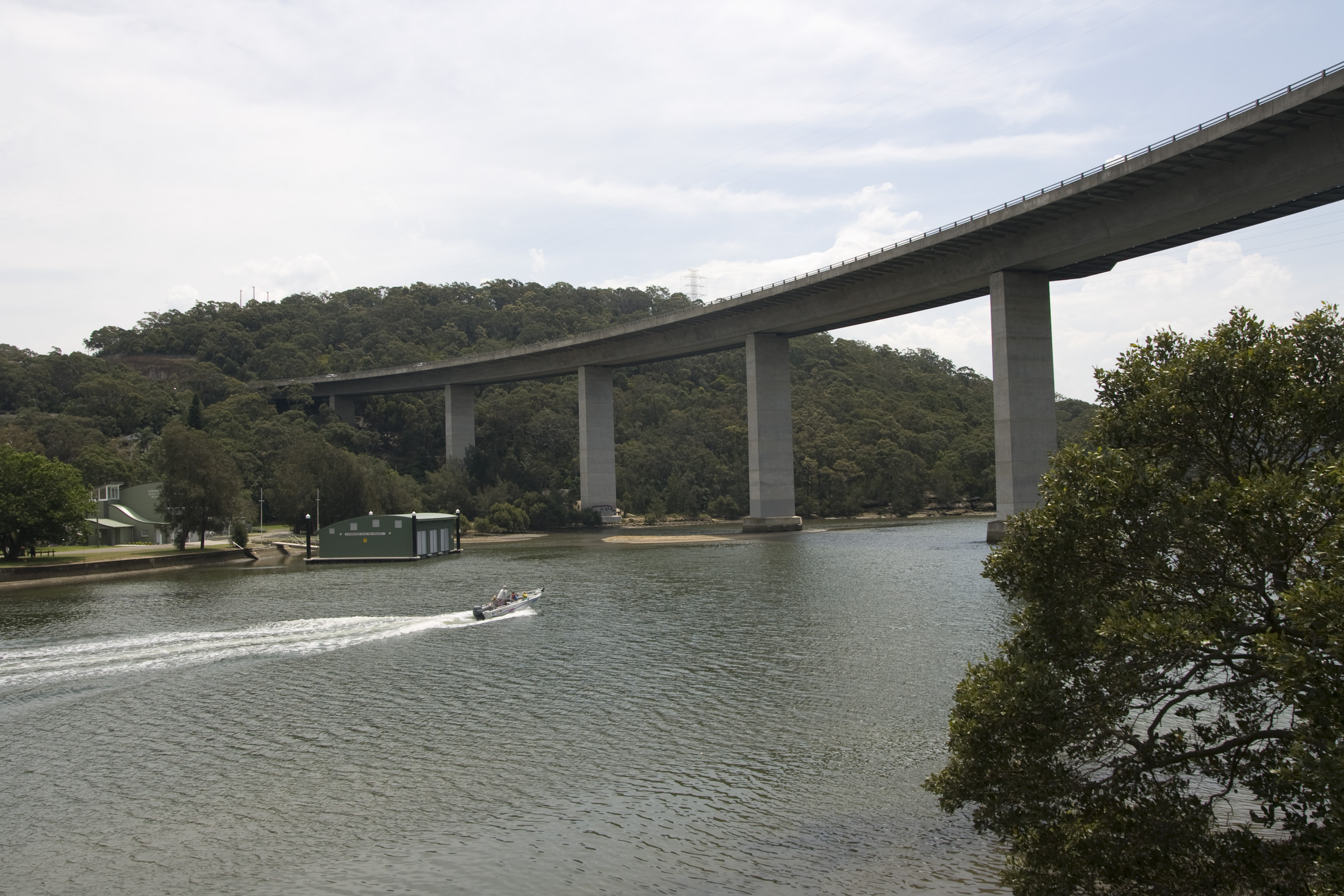
Woronora NSW 2232, Australia – Panorama #5

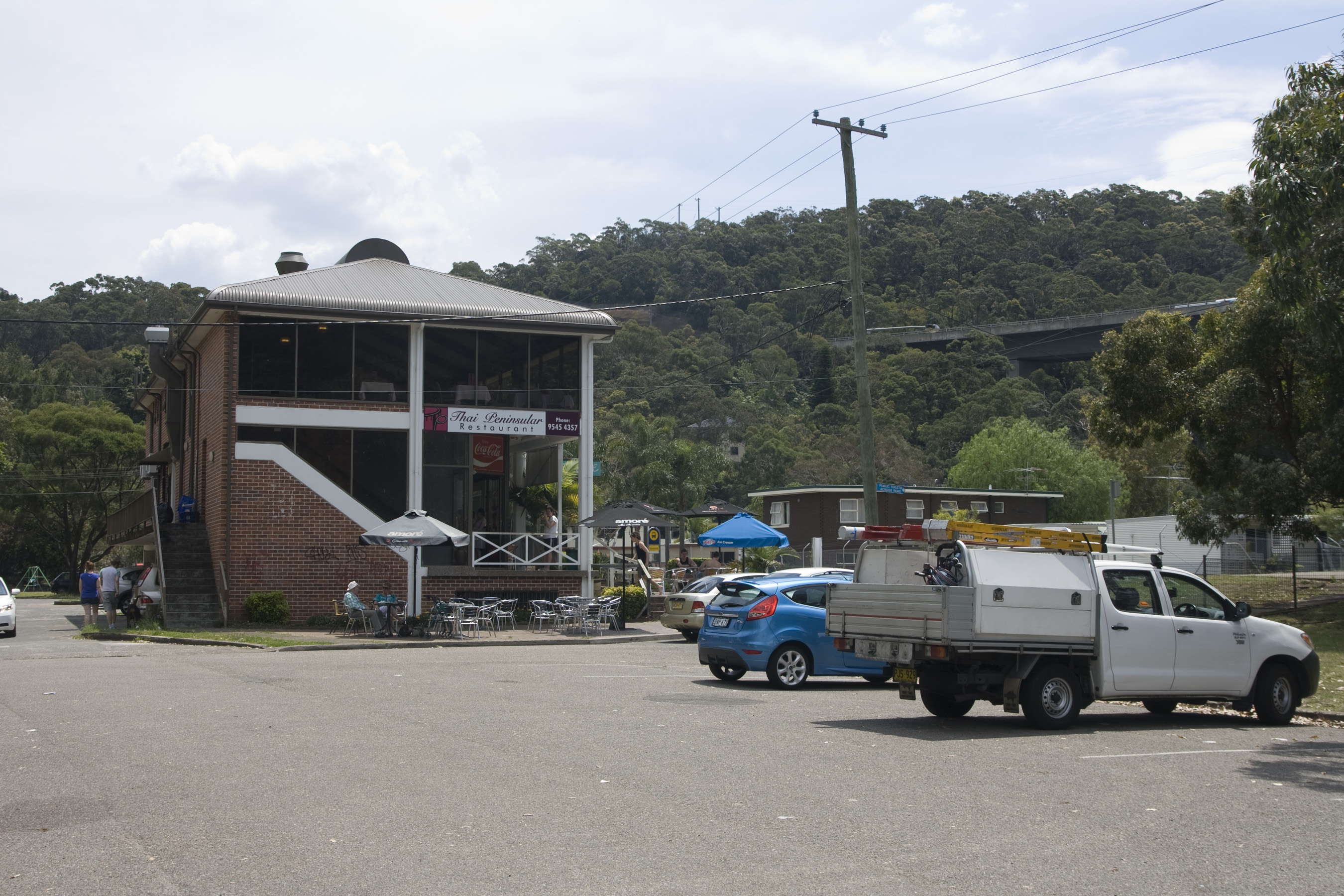
Woronora NSW 2232, Australia – Panorama #6

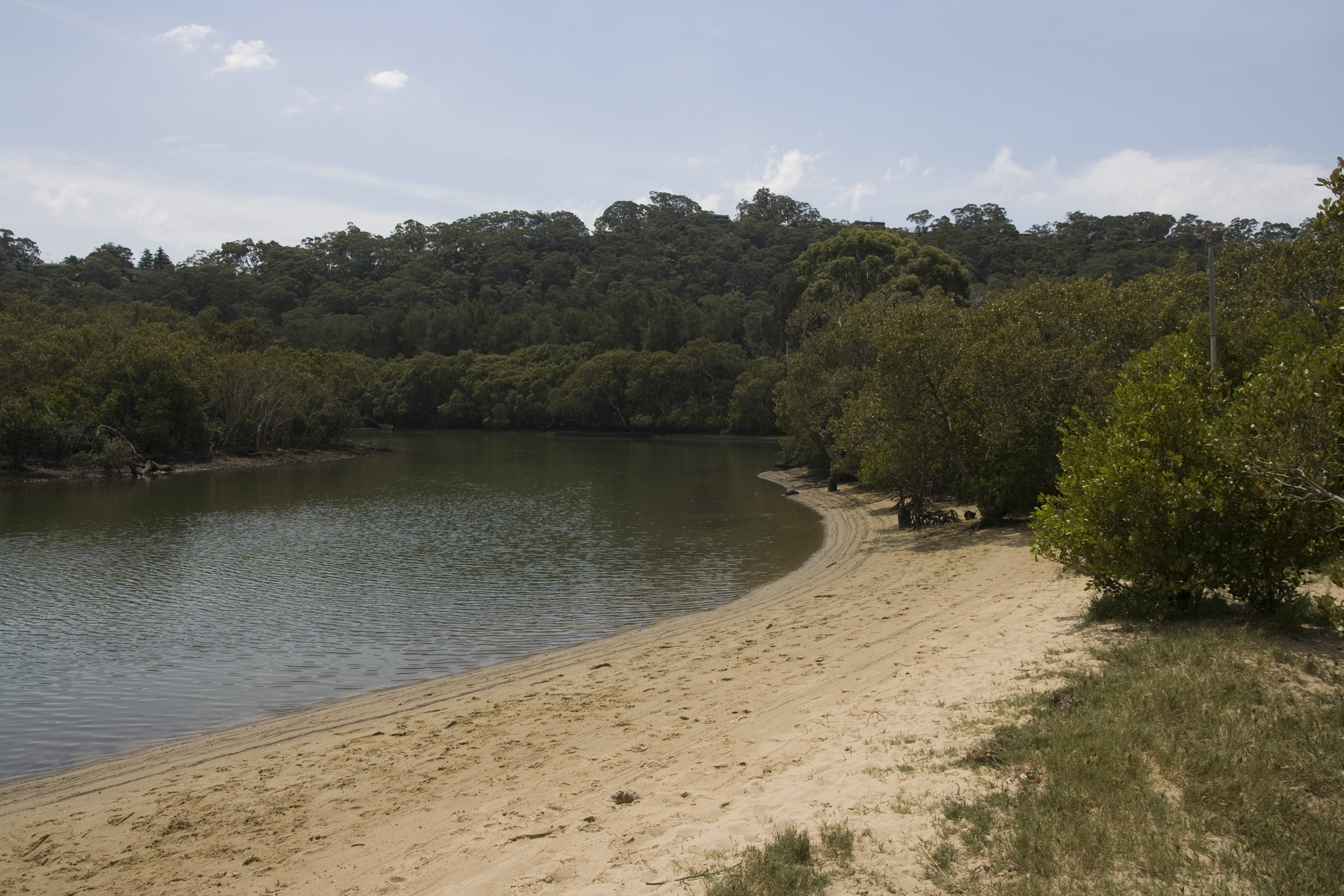
Woronora NSW 2232, Australia – Panorama #7

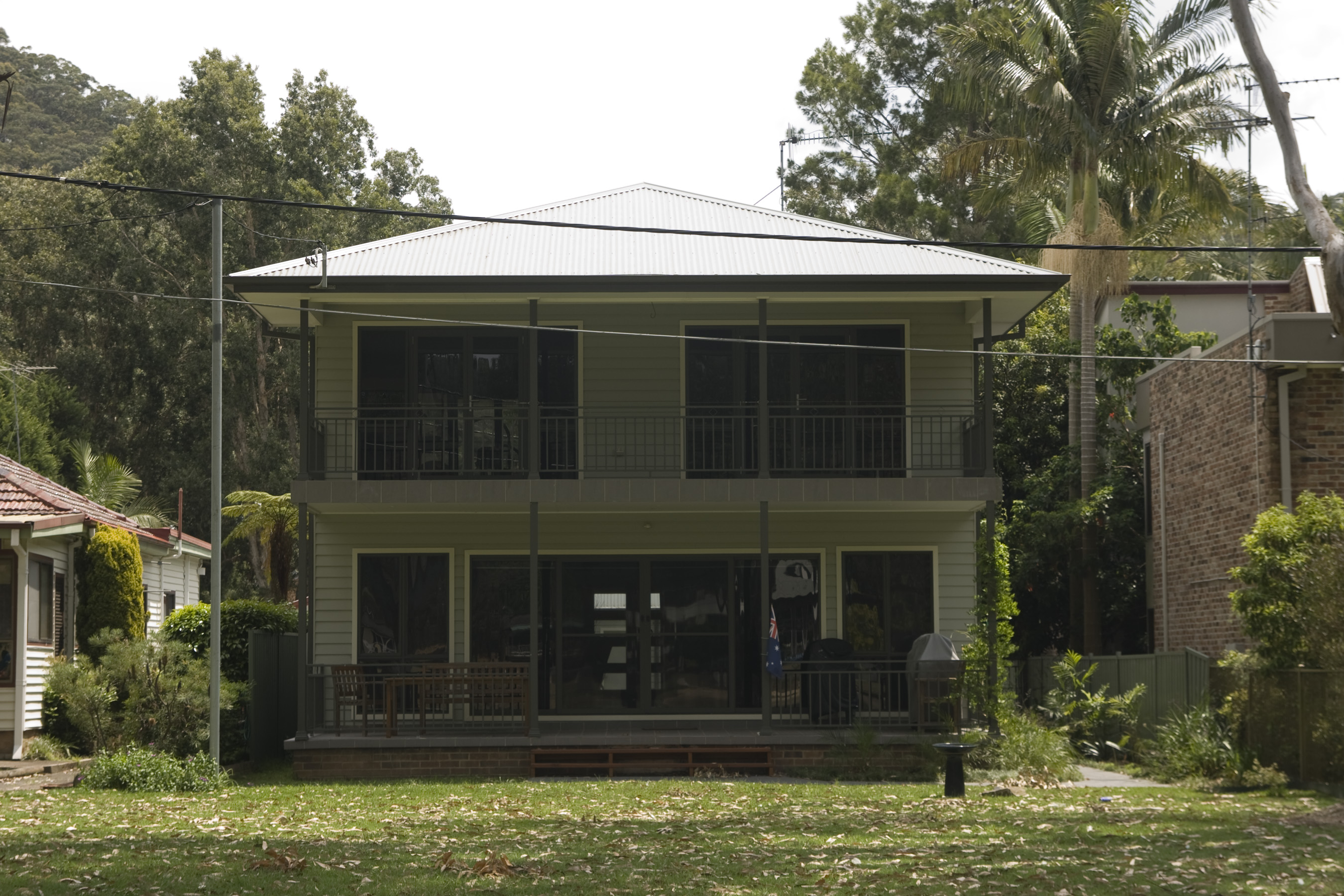
Woronora NSW 2232, Australia – Panorama #8

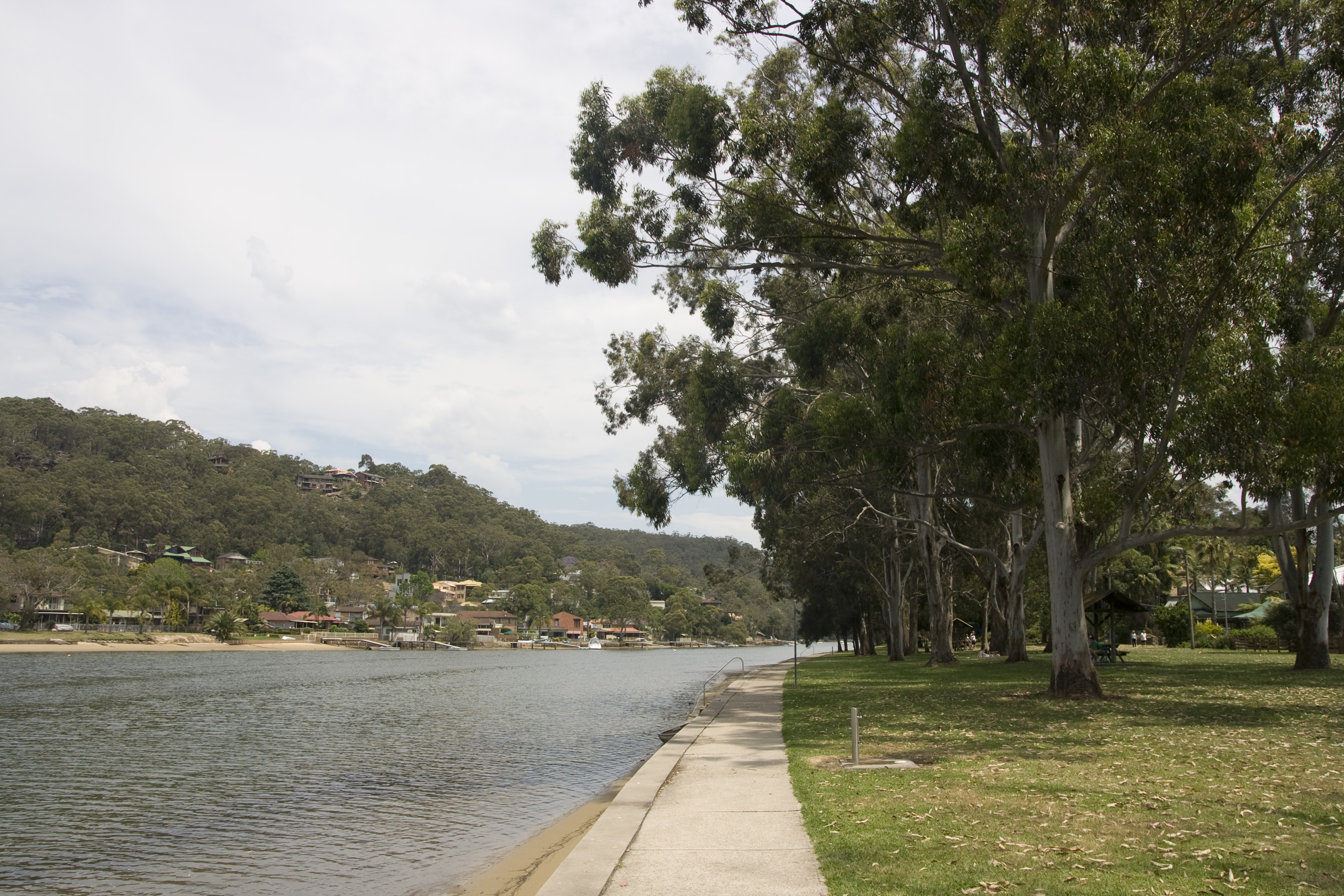
Woronora NSW 2232, Australia – Panorama #9

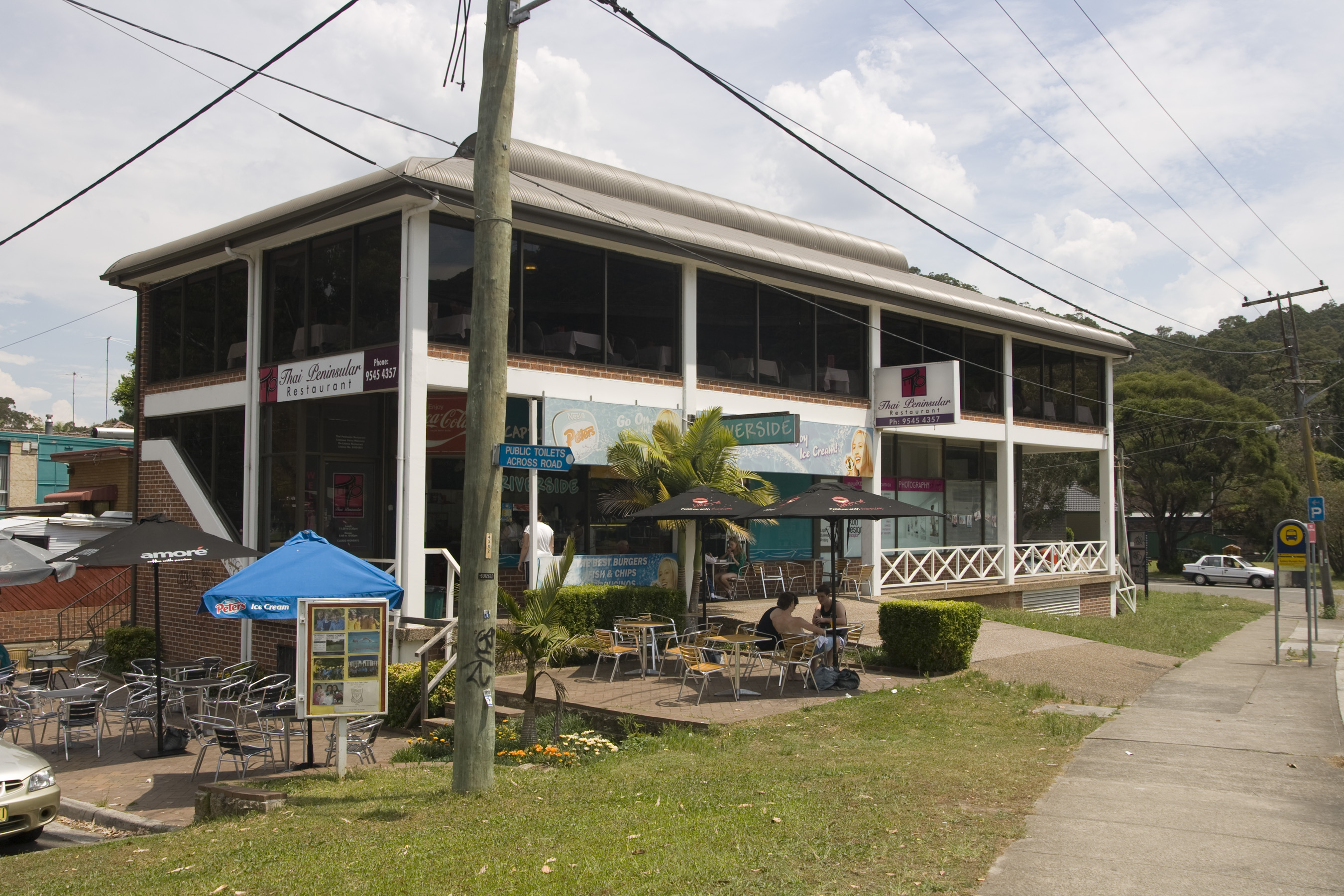
Woronora NSW 2232, Australia – Panorama #10

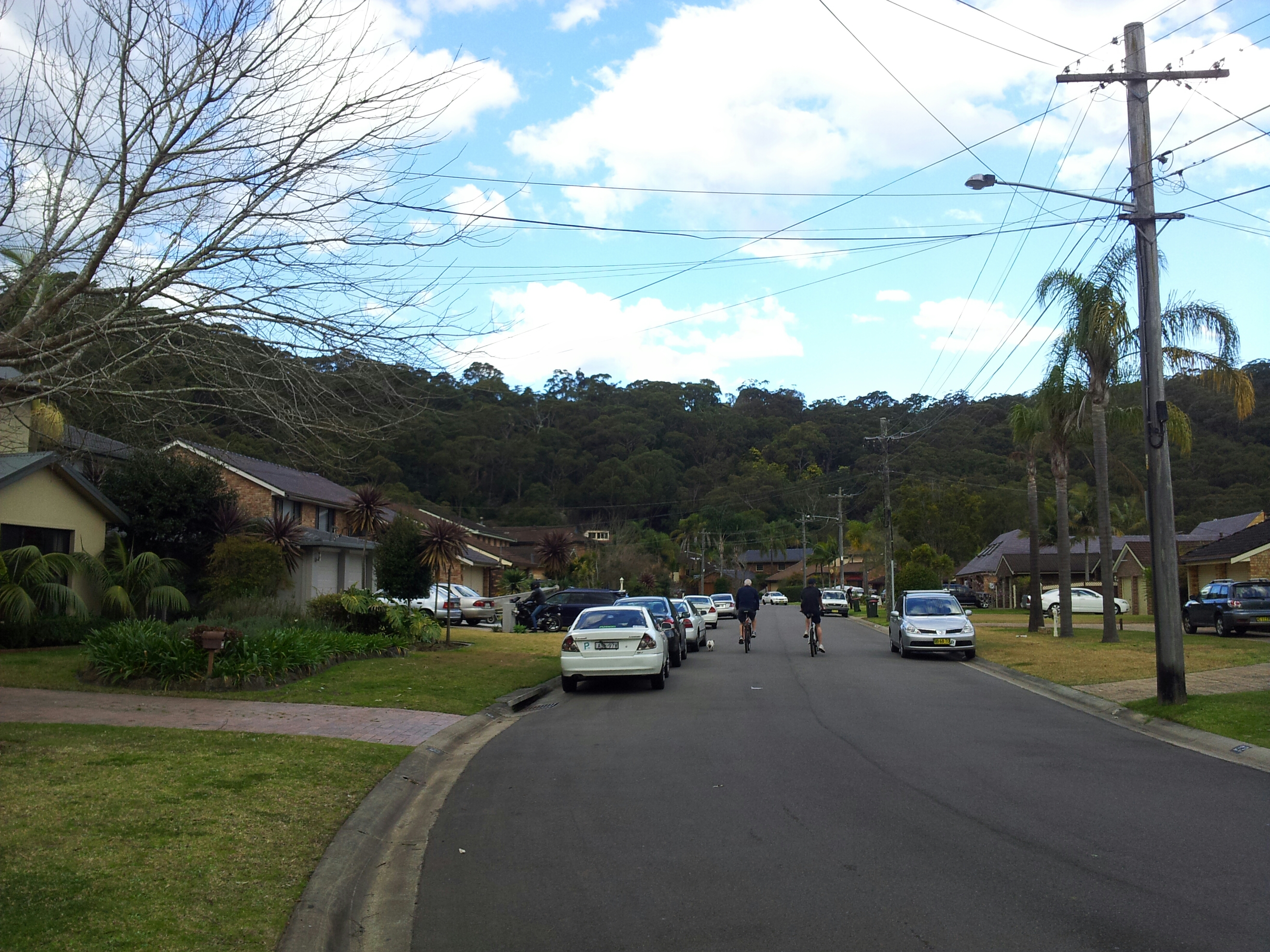
Woronora NSW 2232, Australia – Panorama #11

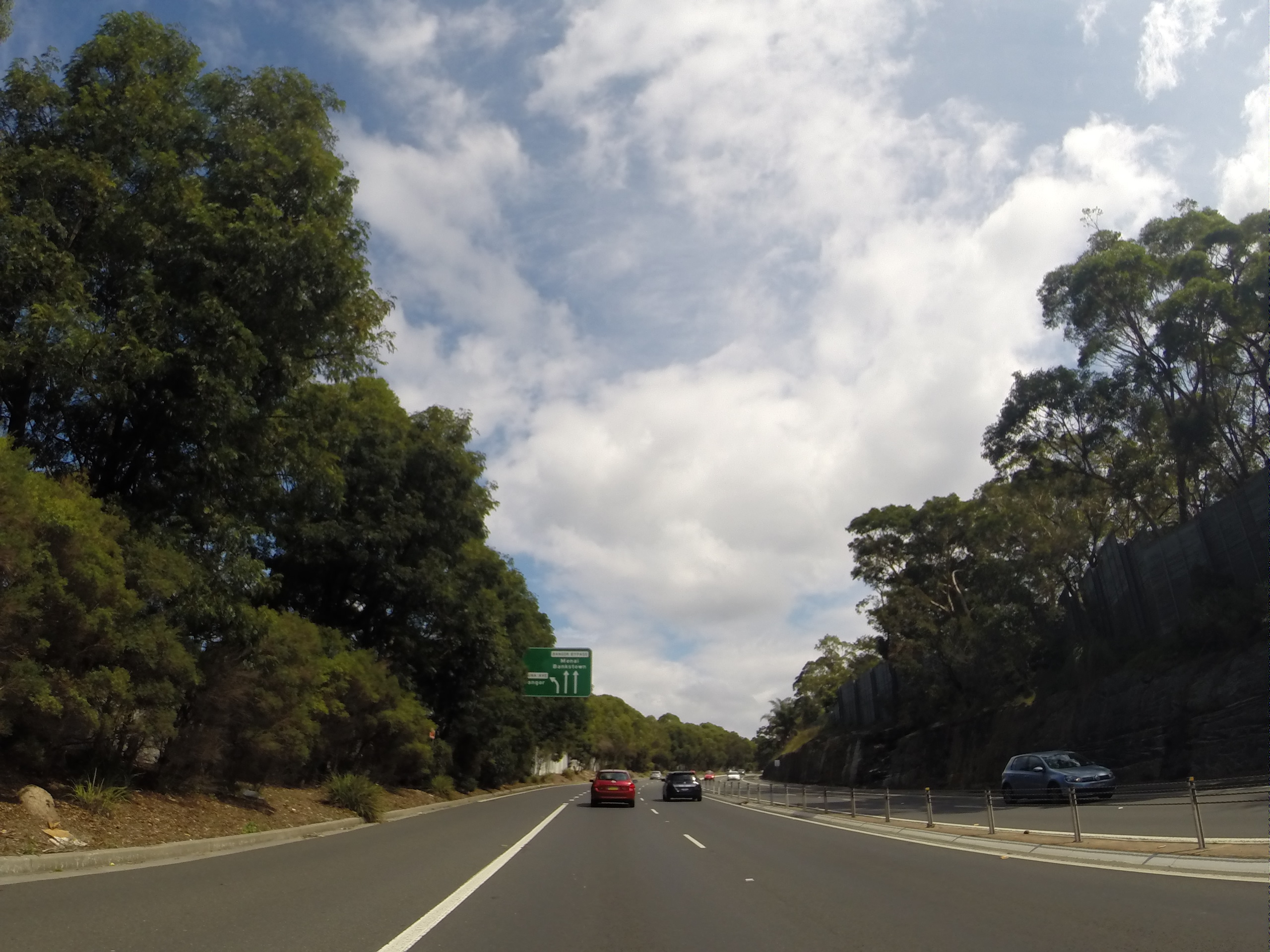
Woronora NSW 2232, Australia – Panorama #12
