= Honoré Martens =

Belgian footballer

Personal information
- Date of birth: 15 June 1912
- Date of death: 6 June 1996 (aged 83)

International career
| Years | Team | Apps | (Gls) |
| 1938 | Belgium | 1 | (0) |

Honoré Martens (15 June 1912 – 6 June 1996) was a Belgian footballer. He played in one match for the Belgium national football team in 1938.
