= Jim Oakes =

Australian rules footballer (1912–1996)

Personal information
- Full name: Leopold Alfred Oakes
- Born: 10 June 1912; Bealiba, Victoria
- Died: 16 June 1996 (aged 84); Brisbane, Queensland
- Height: 180 cm (5 ft 11 in)
- Weight: 74 kg (163 lb)

Playing career^{1}
Years	Club	Games (Goals)
1936	Hawthorn	4 (1)
- ^{1} Playing statistics correct to the end of 1936.

Leopold Alfred 'Jim' Oakes (10 June 1912 – 16 June 1996) was an Australian rules footballer who played with Hawthorn in the Victorian Football League (VFL).

Jim Oakes commenced his senior football career playing for Clayton in the Berwick District League in 1931.

Oakes subsequently joined Springvale, being appointed captain and was the winner of their B&F award 3 years running.

Oakes commenced playing with Hawthorn reserves in 1935 and appeared more frequently in their best players in 1936. At the start of August 1936 Oakes was promoted to the senior team and he played on all four Saturdays in August 1936, scoring a goal in Hawthorn’s game against South Melbourne.

Oakes returned to playing with Springvale in 1937
