= Peter Thullen =

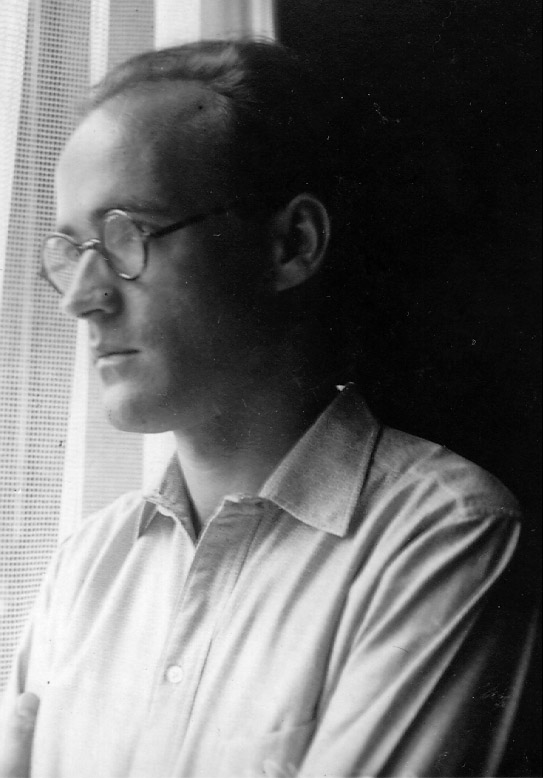
Peter Thullen in 1933

Peter Thullen (24 August 1907 in Trier – 24 June 1996 in Lonay) was a German/Ecuadorian mathematician.

== Academic career ==
He studied under Heinrich Behnke at the University of Münster and received his doctoral degree in 1931 at the age of 23. He is noted for work on several complex variables. One of his achievements is a classification of 2-dimensional bounded Reinhardt domains. He obtained a subsequent research fellowship with Professor Francesco Severi in Rome to explore how algebraic geometry could be integrated into the theory of functions of several complex variables.

== International career ==
In 1952 he left Latin America for Switzerland where he worked at the International Labour Organization. After he retired from the ILO, he went on to teach at the University of Fribourg. He considered returning to Germany at times, but had difficulty securing a position and regaining German citizenship.

== Personal life ==
Peter Thullen was an enthusiastic Wandervogel and active in the Catholic youth movement and opposed the rise of Nazism. He at first studied in Italy on a grant, and was able to observe developments in Germany from abroad. He decided he would not return to Germany so long as Hitler remained in power.

After marriage, he moved to Quito, Ecuador with his wife. At the time he left for Ecuador he did not even know where Quito was located. His five children were all born during his stay in Ecuador.

He would later disapprove of the post-war regime of Konrad Adenauer as he felt it retained some of the "ills" of German nationalism.
