= Gitchandra Tongbra =

Indian satirist, poet, playwright and art academic

- Born: 6 February 1916; Manipur, India
- Died: 3 June 1996 (aged 80)
- Occupations: Writer, teacher
- Awards: Padma Shri

Gitchandra Tongbra (6 February 1916 – 3 June 1996), popularly known as G. C. Tongbra, was an Indian satirist, poet, playwright and art academic from Imphal. Born on 6 February 1913 in the Indian state of Manipur, Tongbra was known for his socio-realistic plays such as Mani Manou (1962), Matric Pass (1964) and Upu Baksi (1972).

== Awards ==
The Government of India awarded him the fourth highest Indian civilian award of Padma Shri in 1975. Four years later, he received the Sahitya Akademi Award for his play, Ngabongkhao, in 1978. The Ministry of Culture, Government of India, honoured his memories by staging a Tongbra Drama Festival under the aegis of Ougri Theatre Repertory Manipur on 24 April 2015 which consisted of four selected plays of the dramatist.
