= Reidar Karlsen =

Norwegian footballer (1911-1996)

Personal information
- Date of birth: 4 January 1911
- Date of death: 21 June 1996 (aged 85)

International career
Years	Team	Apps	(Gls)
1932	Norway	1	(0)

Reidar Karlsen (4 January 1911 – 21 June 1996) was a Norwegian footballer. He played in one match for the Norway national football team in 1932.
