= Bob McIlveen =

Australian rules footballer, born 1919

Personal information
- Full name: Robert Templeton McIlveen
- Born: 18 June 1919; Greenock, Scotland
- Died: 29 June 1996 (aged 77)
- Height: 170 cm (5 ft 7 in)
- Weight: 67 kg (148 lb)

Playing career^{1}
Years	Club	Games (Goals)
1943	Richmond	6 (0)
- ^{1} Playing statistics correct to the end of 1943.

Robert Templeton McIlveen (18 June 1919 – 29 June 1996) was an Australian rules footballer who played with Richmond in the Victorian Football League (VFL).

McIlveen played for Richmond while he was serving in the Australian Army during the Second World War.
