= Norway at the 1936 Summer Olympics =

- IOC code: NOR
- NOC: Norwegian National Federation of Sports

in Berlin, Germany 1-16 August
- Competitors: 70 (68 men, 2 women) in 12 sports
- Flag bearer: Otto Berg (athletics)
- Medals Ranked 18th: Gold 1 Silver 3 Bronze 2 Total 6

Summer Olympics appearances (overview)
- 1900; 1904; 1908; 1912; 1920; 1924; 1928; 1932; 1936; 1948; 1952; 1956; 1960; 1964; 1968; 1972; 1976; 1980; 1984; 1988; 1992; 1996; 2000; 2004; 2008; 2012; 2016; 2020; 2024

Other related appearances
- 1906 Intercalated Games

Norway competed at the 1936 Summer Olympics in Berlin, Germany. 70 competitors, 68 men and 2 women, took part in 43 events in 12 sports.

== Medalists ==
=== Gold ===
- Willy Røgeberg — Shooting, Men's Small-bore Rifle, prone

=== Silver ===
- Henry Tiller — Boxing, Men's Middleweight
- Karsten Konow, Fredrik Meyer, Vaadjuv Nyqvist, and Alf Tveten — Sailing, Men's 6 Meter Class
- John Ditlev-Simonsen, Tit Ditlev-Simonsen, Magnus Konow, Lauritz Schmidt, Hans Struksnæs, Jacob Tullin Thams, and Nordahl Wallem — Sailing, Men's 8 Meter Class

=== Bronze ===
- Erling Nilsen — Boxing, Men's Heavyweight
- Arne Brustad, Nils Eriksen, Odd Frantzen, Sverre Hansen, Rolf Holmberg, Øivind Holmsen, Fredrik Horn, Magnar Isaksen, Henry "Tippen" Johansen, Jørgen Juve, Reidar Kvammen, Alf Martinsen, Magdalon Monsen, and Frithjof Ulleberg — Football (soccer), Men's Team Competition

== Boxing ==
Athlete	Event	Round of 32	Round of 16	Quarterfinals	Semifinals	Final	
Athlete	Event	Opposition Result	Opposition Result	Opposition Result	Opposition Result	Opposition Result	Rank
Asbjørn Berg-Hansen	Flyweight	Russell (GBR); W Points	Laurie (USA); L Points	did not advance			
Ragnar Haugen	Lightweight	Bye	Kops (DEN); L Points	did not advance			
Rudolf Andreassen	Welterweight	Ballado (MEX); W Points	Pedersen (DEN); L Points	did not advance			
Henry Tiller	Middleweight	Peltz (RSA); W Points	Shrimpton (GBR); W Points	Baumgarten (GER); W Points	Chmielewski (POL); W Points	Despeaux (FRA); L Points	2nd place, silver medalist(s)
Jarl Johnsen	Light Heavyweight	Leibbrandt (RSA); L Points	did not advance				
Erling Nilsen	Heavyweight	Bye	Marti (SUI); W DQ at Round 3	Toussaint (LUX); W KO at Round 2	Lovell (ARG); L Points	Nagy (HUN); W Walkover	3rd place, bronze medalist(s)

== Cycling ==
Two male cyclists represented Norway in 1936.

Sprint

- Haakon Sandtorp

Time trial

- Harry Haraldsen

== Diving ==
Men

Athlete	Event	Final	
Athlete	Event	Points	Rank
Sam Melberg	10 m platform	77.76	21

Women

Athlete	Event	Final	
Athlete	Event	Points	Rank
Inger Nordbø	3 m springboard	65.94	11
Tullik Helsing	10 m platform	28.40	13
Inger Nordbø	10 m platform	28.62	12

== Fencing ==
Five fencers, all men, represented Norway in 1936.

Men's foil

- Jens Frølich
- Johan Falkenberg
- Nils Jørgensen

Men's team foil

- Nils Jørgensen, Jens Frølich, Johan Falkenberg, Thorstein Guthe

Men's épée

- Egill Knutzen
- Thorstein Guthe

== Football ==
3 August 1936 Round of 16	Turkey	0–4	Norway	Berlin
17:30		Report	Martinsen 30', 70'; Brustad 53'; Kvammen 80'	Stadium: Mommsenstadion; Attendance: 8,000; Referee: Giuseppe Scarpi (Italy)

7 August 1936 Quarterfinals	Germany	0–2	Norway	Berlin
17:30		Report	Isaksen 7', 83'	Stadium: Poststadion; Attendance: 55,000; Referee: Arthur W. Barton (England)

10 August 1936 Semifinals	Italy	2–1 (a.e.t.)	Norway	Berlin
17:00	Negro 15'; Frossi 96'	Report	Brustad 58'	Stadium: Olympiastadion; Attendance: 95,000; Referee: Pál von Hertzka (Hungary)

13 August 1936 Bronze Medal Match	Norway	3–2	Poland	Berlin
16:00	Brustad 15', 21', 84'	Report	Wodarz 5'; Peterek 24' (pen.)	Stadium: Olympiastadion; Attendance: 82,000; Referee: Alfred Birlem (Germany)

== Rowing ==
Norway had one rower participate in one out of seven rowing events in 1936.

Men's single sculls

- Carl Christiansen

== Shooting ==
Four shooters represented Norway in 1936. Willy Røgeberg won the gold medal in the 50 m rifle event.

25 m rapid fire pistol

- Hans Aasnæs

50 m pistol

- Mauritz Amundsen

50 m rifle, prone

- Willy Røgeberg
- Mauritz Amundsen
- Hakon Aasnæs

== Wrestling ==
- Olaf Knudsen
- Arild Dahl
- Ivar Stokke
