= Boxing at the 1936 Summer Olympics – Welterweight =

Boxing competitions

The men's welterweight event was part of the boxing programme at the 1936 Summer Olympics. The weight class was the fourth-heaviest contested, and allowed boxers of up to 147 pounds (66.7 kilograms). The competition was held from Monday, August 10, 1936, to Saturday, August 15, 1936. Twenty-four boxers from 24 nations competed.

== Medalists ==
Gold	Silver	Bronze
Sten Suvio; Finland	Michael Murach; Germany	Gerhard Pedersen; Denmark

== Results ==
Round of 32; August 10
Roger Tritz (FRA)	W
Francisco Costanzo (URU)	DIS2
Chester Rutecki (USA)	PTS
Maurice Camyré (CAN)	L
Imre Mándi (HUN)	PTS
Umberto Pittori (ITA)	L
Sten Suvio (FIN)	PTS
Keikan Ri (JPN)	L
Leonard Cook (AUS)	PTS
Józef Pisarski (POL)	L
Raúl Rodríguez (ARG)	PTS
Stanislav Rajdl (TCH)	L
Rudolf Andreassen (NOR)	PTS
Emilio Ballado (MEX)	L
Gerhard Pedersen (DEN)	PTS
Enrique Giaverini (CHI)	L

Round of 16; August 11
Michael Murach (GER)	PTS
Walter Pack (GBR)	L
Hens Dekkers (NED)	PTS
Gaspard Deridder (BEL)	L
Simplicio de Castro (PHI)	PTS
Mathias Sancassiani (LUX)	L
Walter Grieb (SUI)	L
Roger Tritz (FRA)	PTS
Chester Rutecki (USA)	L
Imre Mándi (HUN)	PTS
Sten Suvio (FIN)	PTS
Leonard Cook (AUS)	L
Thomas Arbuthnott (NZL)	L
Raúl Rodríguez (ARG)	PTS
Rudolf Andreassen (NOR)	L
Gerhard Pedersen (DEN)	PTS

Quarterfinals; August 13
Michael Murach (GER)	PTS
Hens Dekkers (NED)	L
Simplicio de Castro (PHI)	L
Roger Tritz (FRA)	PTS
Imre Mándi (HUN)	L
Sten Suvio (FIN)	PTS
Raúl Rodríguez (ARG)	L
Gerhard Pedersen (DEN)	PTS

Semifinals; August 14
Michael Murach (GER)	PTS
Roger Tritz (FRA)	L
Sten Suvio (FIN)	PTS
Gerhard Pedersen (DEN)	L

Final; August 15
Michael Murach (GER)	L
Sten Suvio (FIN)	PTS
Bronze medal bout
Gerhard Pedersen (DEN)	PTS
Roger Tritz (FRA)	L
