= Boxing at the 1936 Summer Olympics =

Coordinates: 52.5001°N 13.2708°E

Boxing at the Games of the XI Olympiad
- Dates: 10-15 August 1936

These are the results of the boxing competition at the 1936 Summer Olympics in Berlin. Medals were awarded in eight weight classes. The competitions were held from 10 to 15 August.

The competition featured prominently in the French film L'as des as (1982), whose main character, played by Jean-Paul Belmondo, was the fictitious coach of the French boxing team.

== Medal summary ==
Games	Gold	Silver	Bronze
Flyweight (−50.8 kg / 112 lb)	Willy Kaiser; Germany	Gavino Matta; Italy	Louis Laurie; United States
Bantamweight (−53.5 kg / 118 lb)	Ulderico Sergo; Italy	Jack Wilson; United States	Fidel Ortiz; Mexico
Featherweight (−57.2 kg / 126 lb)	Oscar Casanovas; Argentina	Charles Catterall; South Africa	Josef Miner; Germany
Lightweight (−61.2 kg / 135 lb)	Imre Harangi; Hungary	Nikolai Stepulov; Estonia	Erik Ågren; Sweden
Welterweight (−66.7 kg / 147 lb)	Sten Suvio; Finland	Michael Murach; Germany	Gerhard Pedersen; Denmark
Middleweight (−72.6 kg / 160 lb)	Jean Despeaux; France	Henry Tiller; Norway	Raúl Villarreal; Argentina
Light heavyweight (−79.4 kg / 175 lb)	Roger Michelot; France	Richard Vogt; Germany	Francisco Risiglione; Argentina
Heavyweight (over 79.4 kg/175 lb)	Herbert Runge; Germany	Guillermo Lovell; Argentina	Erling Nilsen; Norway

== Medal table ==
Rank	Nation	Gold	Silver	Bronze	Total
1	Germany	2	2	1	5
2	France	2	0	0	2
3	Argentina	1	1	2	4
4	Italy	1	1	0	2
5	Finland	1	0	0	1
5	Hungary	1	0	0	1
7	Norway	0	1	1	2
7	United States	0	1	1	2
9	Estonia	0	1	0	1
9	South Africa	0	1	0	1
11	Denmark	0	0	1	1
11	Mexico	0	0	1	1
11	Sweden	0	0	1	1
Totals (13 entries)		8	8	8	24

== Participating nations ==
A total of 179 boxers from 31 nations competed at the Berlin Games:

- Argentina (8)
- Australia (3)
- Austria (6)
- Belgium (8)
- Canada (4)
- Chile (4)
- Republic of China (2)
- Czechoslovakia (8)
- Denmark (8)
- Egypt (4)
- Estonia (2)
- Finland (6)
- France (6)
- Germany (8)
- Great Britain (8)
- Hungary (6)
- Italy (8)
- Japan (5)
- Luxembourg (5)
- Mexico (4)
- Netherlands (8)
- New Zealand (3)
- Norway (6)
- Philippines (5)
- Poland (7)
- Romania (4)
- South Africa (6)
- Sweden (4)
- Switzerland (8)
- United States (8)
- Uruguay (7)
