= Boxing at the 1936 Summer Olympics – Heavyweight =

Boxing competitions

The men's heavyweight event was part of the boxing programme at the 1936 Summer Olympics. The weight class was the heaviest contested, and allowed boxers over 175 pounds (79.4 kilograms). The competition was held from Monday, August 10, 1936 to Saturday, August 15, 1936. Seventeen boxers from 17 nations competed.

== Medalists ==
Gold	Silver	Bronze
Herbert Runge; Germany	Guillermo Lovell; Argentina	Erling Nilsen; Norway

== Results ==
Round of 32; August 10
Anthony Stuart (GBR)	PTS
Ab van Bemmel (NED)	L

Round of 16; August 11
José Feans (URU)	PTS
Stanisław Piłat (POL)	L
Guillermo Lovell (ARG)	PTS
Omar Hermansen (DEN)	L
Ernest Toussaint (LUX)	PTS
Karl Lutz (AUT)	L
Erling Nilsen (NOR)	W
Walter Marti (SUI)	DIS3
Olle Tandberg (SWE)	PTS
Art Oliver (USA)	L
Ferenc Nagy (HUN)	PTS
Albert Robbe (BEL)	L
Herbert Runge (GER)	W
Rudolf Kus (TCH)	KO1
Secondo De Marchi (ITA)	L
Anthony Stuart (GBR)	PTS

Quarterfinals; August 13
José Feans (URU)	KO2
Guillermo Lovell (ARG)	W
Ernest Toussaint (LUX)	KO2
Erling Nilsen (NOR)	W
Olle Tandberg (SWE)	L
Ferenc Nagy (HUN)	PTS
Herbert Runge (GER)	PTS
Anthony Stuart (GBR)	L

Semifinals; August 14
Guillermo Lovell (ARG)	PTS
Erling Nilsen (NOR)	L
Ferenc Nagy (HUN)	-
Herbert Runge (GER)	wo

Final; August 15
Guillermo Lovell (ARG)	L
Herbert Runge (GER)	PTS
Bronze medal bout
Erling Nilsen (NOR)	wo
Ferenc Nagy (HUN)	-
