= Boxing at the 1936 Summer Olympics – Middleweight =

Boxing competitions

The men's middleweight event was part of the boxing programme at the 1936 Summer Olympics. The weight class was the third-heaviest contested, and allowed boxers of up to 160 pounds (72.6 kilograms). The competition was held from Tuesday, August 11, 1936, to Saturday, August 15, 1936. Nineteen boxers from 19 nations competed.

== Medalists ==
Gold	Silver	Bronze
Jean Despeaux; France	Henry Tiller; Norway	Raúl Villarreal; Argentina

== Results ==
Round of 32; August 11
Adolf Baumgarten (GER)	PTS
Alfred Flury (SUI)	L
Henry Tiller (NOR)	PTS
Edward Peltz (RSA)	L
Richard Shrimpton (GBR)	W
Chin Kuai-Ti (ROC)	KO1

Round of 16; August 12
Raúl Villarreal (ARG)	PTS
Hans Zehetmayer (AUT)	L
Tin Dekkers (NED)	PTS
Gunnar Andreasen (DEN)	L
Josef Hrubeš (TCH)	PTS
Lajos Szigeti (HUN)	L
Jean Despeaux (FRA)	PTS
Juan Bregaliano (URU)	L
Jimmy Clark (USA)	PTS
Bruno Ahlberg (FIN)	L
Henryk Chmielewski (POL)	PTS
Jean De Schryver (BEL)	L
Benito Totti (ITA)	L
Adolf Baumgarten (GER)	PTS
Henry Tiller (NOR)	PTS
Richard Shrimpton (GBR)	L

Quarterfinals; August 13
Raúl Villarreal (ARG)	PTS
Tin Dekkers (NED)	L
Josef Hrubeš (TCH)	L
Jean Despeaux (FRA)	PTS
Jimmy Clark (USA)	L
Henryk Chmielewski (POL)	PTS
Adolf Baumgarten (GER)	L
Henry Tiller (NOR)	PTS

Semifinals; August 14
Raúl Villarreal (ARG)	L
Jean Despeaux (FRA)	PTS
Henryk Chmielewski (POL)	L
Henry Tiller (NOR)	PTS

Final; August 15
Jean Despeaux (FRA)	PTS
Henry Tiller (NOR)	L
Bronze medal bout
Villarreal (ARG)	wo
Chmielewski (POL)	-
