= Bezdek =

Bezdek may refer to:

== People ==
Bezdek or Bezděk is a surname. The Czech feminine form is Bezděková.

- Hugo Bezdek (1884–1952), Czech-American sports figure
- Károly Bezdek (born 1955), Hungarian-Canadian mathematician
- Pavel Bezdek (born 1965), Czech actor and stunt performer
- Rudolf Bezděk (1916–unknown), Czech boxer
- Zdeňka Bezděková (1907–1999), Czech writer

== Other ==
- 23199 Bezdek a main belt asteroid
