= Alfred Flury =

Swiss boxer

Fred Flury
Personal information
- Nationality: Switzerland
- Born: Alfred Flury; 23 November 1914 Soleure, Switzerland
- Weight: Middleweight

Boxing career

Boxing record
- Total fights: 62
- Wins: 31
- Win by KO: 9
- Losses: 20
- Draws: 11

Alfred Flury (or Fleury, born 23 November 1914; date of death unknown), also known as Fred Flury, was a Swiss boxer who competed in the 1936 Summer Olympics. In 1936 he was eliminated in the first round of the middleweight class after losing his fight to Adolf Baumgarten.

== 1936 Olympic results ==
- Round of 32: lost to Adolf Baumgarten (Germany) by decision
