= Degryse =

Degryse is a surname. Notable people with the surname include:

- Élisabeth Degryse (born 1980), Belgian politician
- Marc Degryse (born 1965), Belgian former professional footballer
- Raoul Degryse (1912–1993), Belgian boxer
