= Erkki Savolainen =

Finnish boxer

Erkki Olavi Savolainen (August 21, 1917 in Helsinki – December 26, 1993 in Helsinki) was a Finnish boxer who competed in the 1936 Summer Olympics.

In 1936 he was eliminated in the first round of the flyweight class after losing his fight to Chiyoto Nakano.

== 1936 Olympic results ==
Below are the results of Erkki Savolainen, a Finnish boxer who competed in the flyweight division at the 1936 Berlin Olympics:

- Round of 32: lost to Chiyoto Nakano (Japan)
