= Francisco Costanzo =

Uruguayan boxer

Francisco Costanzo Milano (born November 4, 1912, died January 6, 1997) was a Uruguayan boxer from Montevideo who competed in the 1936 Summer Olympics. In 1936 he was eliminated in the first round of the welterweight class after losing his fight to Roger Tritz. In the 1937 Pan American Boxing Championships, held in Dallas, Texas, Costanzo defeated Jose Martorell as the lone Uruguay win of the tournament.
