= Boxing at the 1936 Summer Olympics – Flyweight =

Boxing competitions

The men's flyweight event was part of the boxing programme at the 1936 Summer Olympics. The weight class was the lightest contested, and allowed boxers of up to 112 pounds (50.8 kilograms). The competition was held from Monday, August 10, 1936 to Saturday, August 15, 1936. Twenty-four boxers from 24 nations competed.

== Medalists ==
Gold	Silver	Bronze
Willy Kaiser; Germany	Gavino Matta; Italy	Louis Laurie; United States

== Results ==
Round of 32; August 10
Willy Kaiser (GER)	—
Bye	—
Guillermo López (CHI)	—
Bye	—
Fidel Tricánico (URU)	—
Bye	—
William Passmore (RSA)	—
Bye	—
Mahmoud Ezzat (EGY)	—
Bye	—
Alfredo Carlomagno (ARG)	—
Bye	—
Chiyoto Nakano (JPN)	PTS
Erkki Savolainen (FIN)	L
Louis Laurie (USA)	PTS
Rudolf Bezděk (TCH)	L
Asbjørn Berg-Hansen (NOR)	PTS
Alfred Russell (GBR)	L
Edmund Sobkowiak (POL)	W
Henry C. Cooper (AUS)	KO2
Walter Siegfried (SUI)	PTS
Gaston Fayaud (FRA)	L
Raoul Degryse (BEL)	W
Sture Hållberg (SWE)	KO1
Felipe Nunag (PHI)	PTS
Dumitru Panaitescu (ROU)	L
Kaj Frederiksen (DEN)	PTS
Fernand Ciatti (LUX)	L
Gavino Matta (ITA)	PTS
Tinus Lambillion (NED)	L

Round of 16; August 12
Kaiser (GER)	W
López (CHI)	RSC3
Tricánico (URU)	—
Bye	—
Passmore (RSA)	PTS
Ezzat (EGY)	L
Carlomagno (ARG)	PTS
Nakano (JPN)	L
Laurie (USA)	PTS
Berg-Hansen (NOR)	L
Sobkowiak (POL)	PTS
Siegfried (SUI)	L
Degryse (BEL)	PTS
Nunag (PHI)	L
Frederiksen (DEN)	L
Matta (ITA)	PTS

Quarterfinals; August 13
Kaiser (GER)	PTS
Tricánico (URU)	L
Passmore (RSA)	L
Carlomagno (ARG)	PTS
Laurie (USA)	PTS
Sobkowiak (POL)	L
Degryse (BEL)	L
Matta (ITA)	PTS

Semifinals; August 14
Kaiser (GER)	PTS
Carlomagno (ARG)	L
Laurie (USA)	L
Matta (ITA)	PTS

Final; August 15
Kaiser (GER)	PTS
Matta (ITA)	L
Bronze medal bout
Laurie (USA)	wo
Carlomagno (ARG)	-
