= Jimmy Clark (boxer) =

American boxer

James G. Clark (February 26, 1914 – September 12, 1994), also known as Jimmy Atkinson, was an American boxer who competed in the 1936 Summer Olympics.

He was born James Clark Atkinson in Norfolk, Virginia, to parents Ernest Atkinson and Beatrice Davis.

At the 1936 Summer Olympics he was eliminated in the quarter-finals of the middleweight class after losing his fight to Henryk Chmielewski. After the Olympics, he turned professional with a career record of 19 wins and 20 losses. His biggest professional win was a first-round knockout of Tony Zale on February 21, 1938 in Chicago.

Clark was inducted into the Chautauqua Sports Hall of Fame in 1983 and the Buffalo Boxing Hall of Fame in 1998. An Army veteran of World War II, he died at the age of 80 in Jamestown, New York.
