= Stanislav Rajdl =

Czechoslovak boxer

Stanislav Rajdl (26 June 1911 – 13 May 1978) was a Czech boxer who competed in the 1936 Summer Olympics for Czechoslovakia. In 1936 he was eliminated in the first round of the welterweight class after losing his fight to Raúl Rodríguez.
