= Maurice Camyré =

Canadian boxer

Maurice Camyré (March 10, 1915 – January 15, 2013) was a Canadian boxer who competed in the 1936 Summer Olympics. He was born in St. Vital. In 1936 he was eliminated in the first round of the welterweight class after losing his fight to Chester Rutecki.
