= Umberto Pittori =

Italian boxer

Umberto Pittori (4 May 1913 – 13 October 1964) was an Italian boxer who competed in the 1936 Summer Olympics. In 1936 he was eliminated in the first round of the welterweight class after losing his fight to Imre Mándi.

He later was a professional boxer from 1938 to 1948, winning 19 of the 27 matches he was in.
