= Józef Pisarski =

Polish boxer

Personal information
- Born: 15 June 1913 Łódź, Russian Empire
- Died: 1986 (aged 73) Łódź, Poland

Boxing career
Medal record
Men's amateur boxing
Representing Poland
European Amateur Championships
Silver medal – second place	1939 Dublin	Welterweight

Józef Pisarski (15 June 1913 – 8 December 1986) was a Polish boxer who competed in the 1936 Summer Olympics.

He was born and died in Łódź.

In 1936 he was eliminated in the first round of the welterweight class after losing his fight to Leonard Cook.
