= Jean De Schryver =

Belgian boxer

Jean Albert De Schryver (7 March 1916 – 26 January 1981) was a Belgian boxer who competed in the 1936 Summer Olympics. In 1936 he was eliminated in the second round of the middleweight class after losing his fight to Henryk Chmielewski.
