= Dumitru Panaitescu =

Romanian boxer

Dumitru Panaitescu (May 1, 1913 – February 3, 1986) was a Romanian boxer who competed in the 1936 Summer Olympics. In 1936 he was eliminated in the first round of the flyweight class after losing his fight to Felipe Nunag.
