= Gaspard Deridder =

Belgian boxer

Gaspard Deridder (4 March 1918 – 1977) was a Belgian boxer who competed in the 1936 Summer Olympics.

In 1936 he was eliminated in the second round of the welterweight class after losing his fight to Hens Dekkers.
