= Walter Siegfried =

Swiss boxer

- Born: March 21, 1919
- Died: April 21, 2002

Walter Siegfried (March 21, 1919 – April 21, 2002) was a Swiss boxer who competed in the 1936 Summer Olympics.

In 1936 he advanced past the first round of the flyweight class after defeating Gaston Fayaud of France. He was eliminated by decision in the second round after losing his fight to Edmund Sobkowiak of Poland. Walter later immigrated to the U.S. joined the Army attained the rank of sergeant and served in Korea. He was a part of the Olympic Torch relay in the 2002 Winter Olympics at Salt Lake City.
