= Henry C. Cooper =

Australian boxer

Henry Charles Cooper (22 November 1913 – 18 June 1998) was an Australian boxer who competed in the 1936 Summer Olympics. In 1936, he was eliminated in the first round of the flyweight class after losing his fight to Edmund Sobkowiak.
