= Enrique Giaverini =

Chilean boxer

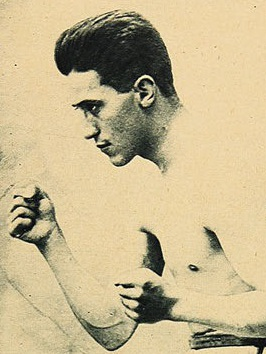
Giaverini in 1924

Enrique Giaverini (17 May 1906 – 14 July 1977) was a Chilean boxer who competed in the 1936 Summer Olympics. In 1936 he was eliminated in the first round of the welterweight class after losing his fight to the upcoming bronze medalist Gerhard Pedersen.
