= Grieb =

Grieb is a surname. Notable people with the surname include:

- A. Katherine Grieb, American theologian
- John Grieb (1879–1939), American gymnast and track and field athlete
- Manfred H. Grieb (1933-2012), American-German entrepreneur and art collector
- Mark Grieb (born 1974), American football quarterback
- Walter Grieb (1911-?), Swiss boxer
