= Mahmoud Ezzat (boxer) =

Egyptian boxer

Mahmoud Ezzat (September 11, 1913 – November 17, 1974) was an Egyptian boxer. He competed in the 1936 Summer Olympics. He died of injuries following a car accident in 1974.

== Career ==
In 1936, Ezzat was eliminated in the second round of the flyweight class, after having lost his fight to William Passmore.
