= Stanisław Piłat =

Polish boxer

Stanisław Piłat (April 13, 1909 – May 10, 1993) was a Polish boxer who competed in the 1936 Summer Olympics.

He was born and died in Nowy Targ.

In 1936 he was eliminated in the second round of the heavyweight class after losing his fight to José Feans.

== 1936 Olympic results ==
Below is the record of Stanisław Piłat, a Polish heavyweight boxer who competed at the 1936 Berlin Olympics:

- Round of 32: bye
- Round of 16: lost to José Feans (Uruguay) by decision
