= Mathias Sancassiani =

Luxembourgish boxer

Mathias Sancassiani (January 5, 1907 – February 23, 1972) was a Luxembourgish boxer who competed in the 1928 Summer Olympics and in the 1936 Summer Olympics. He was born in Esch-sur-Alzette.

In 1928 he was eliminated in the second round of the lightweight class after losing his fight to Hans Jacob Nielsen. Eight years later he was eliminated in the second round of the welterweight class after losing his bout to Simplicio de Castro.
