= Hrubeš =

Hrubeš is a Czech surname. Notable people with the surname include:

- Josef Hrubeš (1916–?), Czech boxer
- Karel Hrubeš (born 1993), Czech footballer

== See also ==
- Horst Hrubesch (born 1951), German football player and manager
