= Benito Totti =

Italian boxer

Benito Totti (May 10, 1914 – February 15, 1989) was an Italian boxer who competed in the 1936 Summer Olympics.

He was eliminated in the second round of the middleweight class after losing his fight to Adolf Baumgarten.
