= Ab van Bemmel =

Dutch boxer

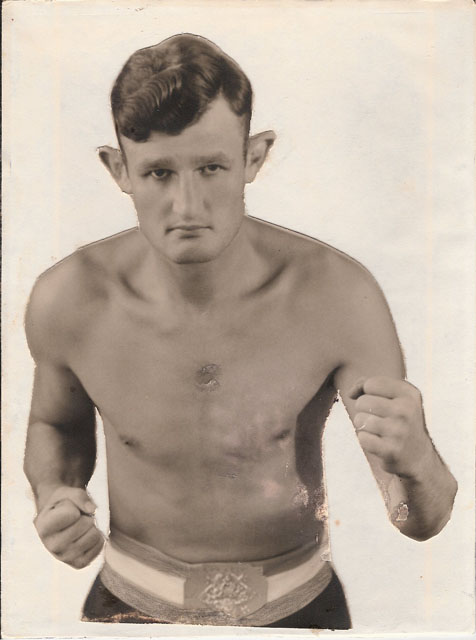
Ab van Bemmel

Albertus "Ab" Marinus Christiaan van Bemmel (2 August 1912 – 19 February 1986) was a Dutch boxer who competed in the 1936 Summer Olympics.

He was born and died in Rotterdam.

In 1936 he was eliminated in the first round of the heavyweight class after losing his fight to Anthony Stuart.
