= Walter Pack =

English boxer

Wally Pack
Personal information
- Nationality: British (English)
- Born: 30 December 1914 Lewisham, London, England
- Died: 27 July 1974 (aged 59) Worthing, West Sussex, England

Sport
- Sport: boxing

Walter Seaforth Pack (30 December 1914 – 27 July 1974) was a British boxer who competed in the 1936 Summer Olympics. He fought as Wally Pack.

== Boxing career ==
Pack won the 1936 Amateur Boxing Association British welterweight title, when boxing out of the Polytechnic Boxing Club.

In 1936 he was eliminated in the second round of the welterweight class after losing his fight to the upcoming silver medalist Michael Murach of Germany.

=== 1936 Olympic results ===
- Round of 32: bye
- Round of 16: lost to Michael Murach (Germany) on points
