= Secondo De Marchi =

Italian boxer

Secondo De Marchi (30 July 1911 – 18 April 1996) was an Italian boxer who competed in the 1936 Summer Olympics. In 1936, he was eliminated in the second round of the heavyweight class after losing his fight to Anthony Stuart. During World War II, De Marchi had Italian people hiding in the attic of his boxing school in Rotterdam.
