= Sture Hållberg =

Swedish boxer

Sture Hållberg (June 11, 1917 – June 8, 1988) was a Swedish boxer who competed in the 1936 Summer Olympics.

In 1936 he was eliminated in the first round of the flyweight class after losing his fight to Raoul Degryse.
