= Juan Bregaliano =

Uruguayan boxer

Juan Bregaliano (born February 22, 1911, date of death unknown) is a Uruguayan boxer who competed in the 1936 Summer Olympics. In 1936 he was eliminated in the second round of the middleweight class after losing his fight to the upcoming gold medalist Jean Despeaux.
