= Raul Rodriguez =

Raul Rodriguez or Raúl Rodríguez may refer to:

- Raúl Rodríguez (boxer) (born 1915), Argentine boxer
- Raúl Rodríguez (footballer) (born 1987), Spanish footballer
- Raúl Rodríguez Lazo (fl. 1950s), Chilean politician
- Raúl Rodríguez Navas (born 1988), Spanish footballer
- Raul A. Rodriguez, real name of American early electro artiste C.O.D. (musician)

== See also ==
- Raoul Rodriguez (born 1963), American Olympic rower
