= Albert Robbe =

Belgian boxer (1916–1942)

Albert Robbe (15 February 1916 – 21 January 1942) was a Belgian boxer. He competed in the 1936 Summer Olympics. In 1936, Robbe was eliminated in the second round of the heavyweight class after losing his fight to Ferenc Nagy of Hungary.
