= Erling Nilsen =

Norwegian boxer

Olympic medal record

Men's Boxing
Bronze medal – third place	1936 Berlin	heavyweight

Erling Nilsen (December 30, 1910 – April 23, 1984) was a Norwegian boxer who competed in the 1936 Summer Olympics.

== Amateur career ==
In 1936 he won the bronze medal in the heavyweight class after winning the third place fight against Ferenc Nagy. Nilsen also won 7 National Titles in Norway and had 15 victories on the National Team.

=== Olympic Results ===
Nilsen represented Norway in the 1936 Olympics, Berlin. Won the Bronze Medal.

- W Dq Walter Marti, Switzerland
- W KO 2 Ernest Toussaint, Luxembourg
- L 3 Guillermo Lovell, Argentina
- W WO Ferenc Nagy, Hungary

=== Other Highlights ===
Nilsen won the Bronze Medal in the European Championships, Milan, Italy 1937:

- W 3 Pilat, Poland
- L 3 Olle Tandberg, Sweden

He was a member of the first official boxing contest between England and Norway on December 8, 1935 in the Oslo Colosseum; his opponent was H. P. Floyd. He represented the club BK Pugilist.
