= Karl Lutz =

Austrian boxer (born 1914)

Personal information
- Nationality: Austrian
- Born: 23 February 1914

Sport
- Sport: Boxing

Karl Lutz (born 23 February 1914, date of death unknown) was an Austrian heavyweight boxer who competed in the 1936 Summer Olympics.

Lutz selected after winning the Austrian National Championship and was eliminated in the second round of the heavyweight class after losing his fight to Ernest Toussaint of Luxembourg.
