= José Feans =

Uruguayan boxer

José Feans (born April 24, 1912, date of death unknown) is a Uruguayan boxer who competed in the 1936 Summer Olympics. In 1936 he was eliminated in the quarter-finals of the heavyweight class after losing his fight to the upcoming silver medalist Guillermo Lovell.

== 1936 Olympic results ==
Below is the record of José Feans, a Uruguayan heavyweight boxer who competed at the 1936 Berlin Olympics:

- Round of 32: bye
- Round of 16: defeated Stanislaw Pilat (Poland) on points
- Quarterfinal: lost to Guillermo Lovell (Argentina) by a second-round knockout
