= Hinzert concentration camp =

Nazi concentration camp in Germany (1939–1945)

Hinzert
- Nazi concentration camp
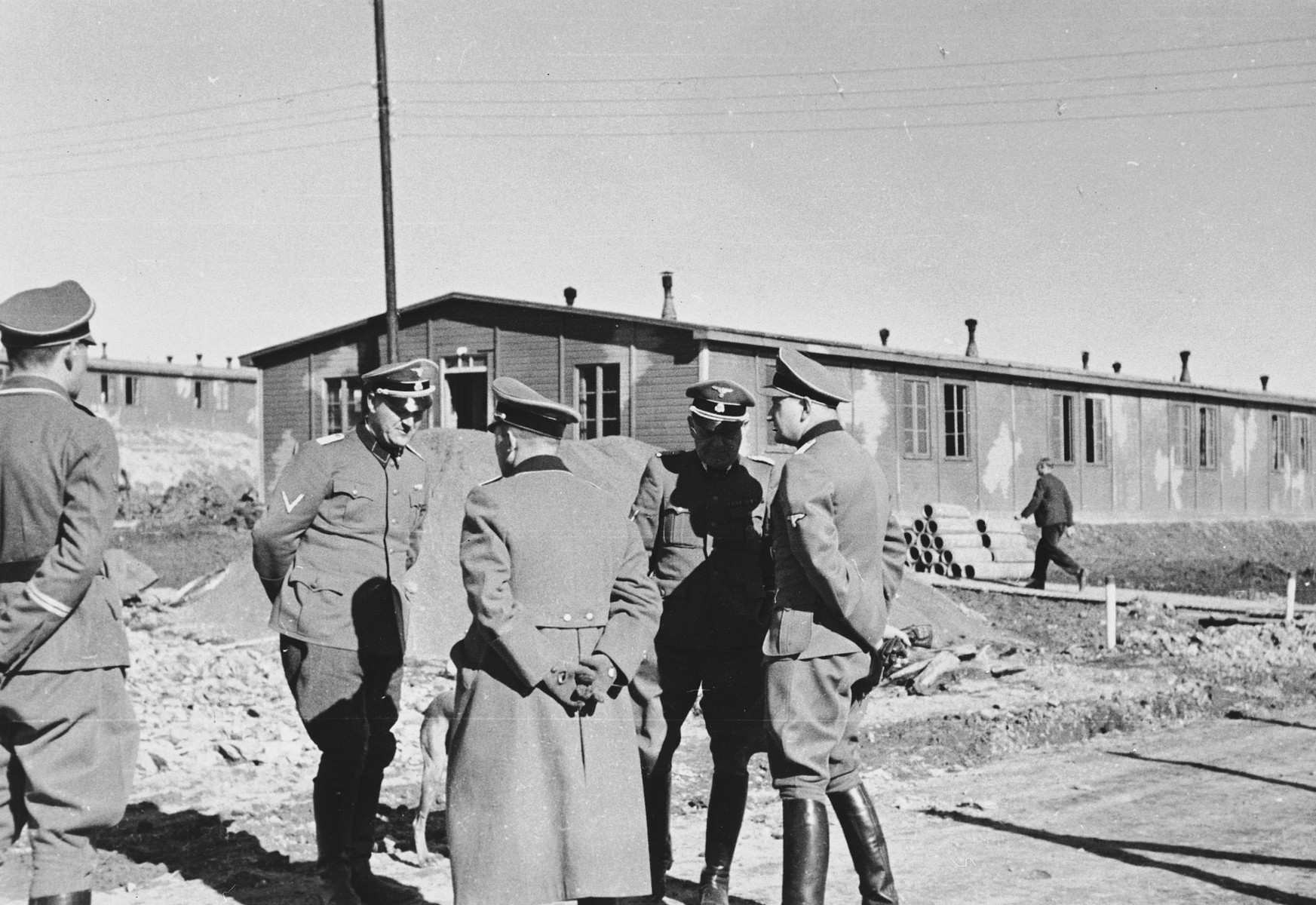
- SS officers at a construction site in the Hinzert concentration camp

- Location of Hinzert within Germany
- Coordinates: 49°41′56″N 6°53′34″E
- Location: Rhineland-Palatinate, Germany
- Operational: 1939–1945
- Number of inmates: 13,600 (in 20 satellite camps)
- Killed: over 1,000

Hinzert was a concentration camp in Nazi Germany, in what is now Rhineland-Palatinate, 30 kilometres (19 mi) from the border with Luxembourg. Between 1939 and 1945, 13,600 political prisoners between the ages of 13 and 80 were imprisoned at Hinzert. Many were in transit towards larger concentration camps where most would be killed. However, many prisoners were executed at Hinzert. The camp was administered, run, and guarded mainly by the SS, who, according to survivors, were notorious for their brutality and viciousness.

== Location and layout ==
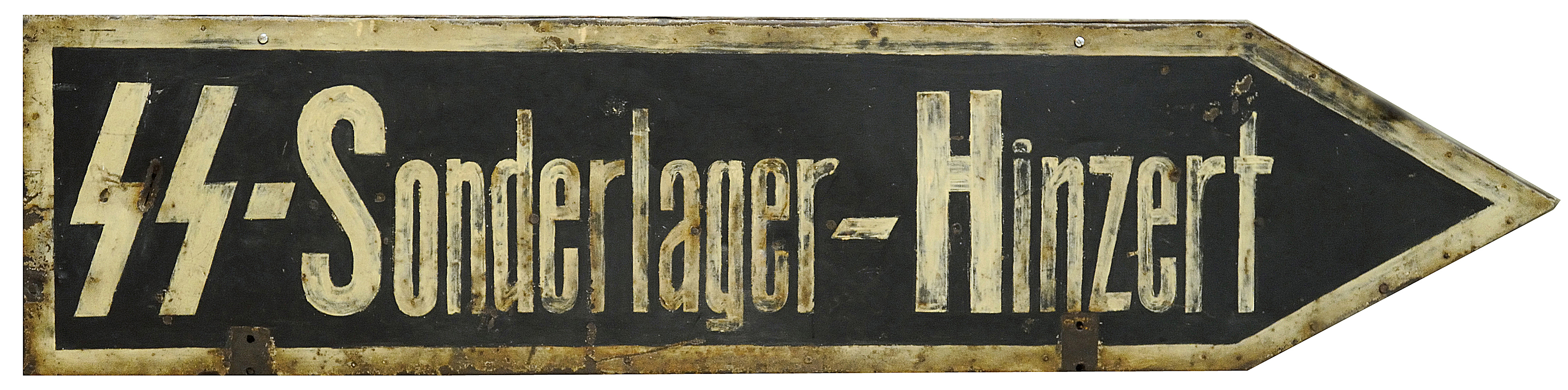
Historical road sign at the Hinzert concentration camp.

Located on the Hochwald plateau, and overlooking the Hunsrück mountain range, the Hinzert concentration camp was named after the nearest village, now called Hinzert-Pölert. At an altitude of 550m, the plateau was exposed to much humidity, wind, strong precipitation, fog and glacial temperatures in winter. The camp was surrounded by a coniferous forest that provided lumber for the camp's construction and maintenance.

An access road that first bordered the prisoners' cemetery led to a first area guarded by the SS. This area contained seven huts, a guard post, the camp's Kommandantur or command post, a garage, workshops, the officers' mess and two SS housing huts. This area was decorated with floral and garden arrangements. Prisoners were kept in another area measuring approximately 200m by 200m, bordered by a 3m high barbed wire fence with watchtowers. The prisoners' area also contained the camp commander's quarters, the clothing workshop, the carpenter's area, the quarantine area, the morgue, a disinfection area and the "cloakroom" where the prisoners' belongings were kept.

Prisoners were housed in four barracks, each containing two spaces that in turn contained 26 bunk beds for the projected capacity of 208 prisoners. Later, straw mattresses were added to increase the total capacity to 560. Certain rooms were reserved for a particular category of prisoners, such as the Night and Fog prisoners.

Three other buildings in the camp contained the local Gestapo offices, the administrative offices and the kitchen. Different zones were located around one central roll-call area, the size of which was later reduced as the SS created a neighbouring vegetable patch. A mast stood in the centre of the roll-call area bearing loudspeakers through which orders were delivered. Prisoners sometimes had to stand still for hours facing the mast as punishment. The roll call area was also used as a drill and exercise area, where prisoners had to jump up and down at 4.30 am to the sound of a drum.

== Operational history ==
The Hinzert concentration camp was first established in 1938 to house workers who were building the West Wall. However, it burnt down on August 16, 1939, and was rebuilt in October 1939 as a police detention and re-education camp, or Polizeihaft- und Erziehungslager des Reichsarbeitsdienstes (RAD), for prisoners condemned to light sentences (under 14 days) and for those workers that had demonstrated what the Nazi regime would call antisocial behavior. These workers, many of whom had been brought in by the Bremen Gestapo worked not only on the West Wall, but also on other military infrastructure projects such as air bases in Mannheim and in Mainz.

On July 1, 1940, the camp was placed under the jurisdiction of the Inspector of Concentration Camps. After the invasion of Belgium, the Netherlands, Luxembourg and France in 1940, Hinzert also became a prison camp for political prisoners from those countries who needed to be "re-germanised" or who were placed under "Schutzhaft". On February 7, 1942, command over the camp was transferred to the SS Central Office for Economics and Administration (WVHA). It also then became a camp for the Gestapo of the Luxembourg and Trier area. Until the first Night and Fog prisoners arrived, the camp operated following the organisational structure of other camps, and namely contained a Kommandantur, a Politische Abteilung or political section, a "detention and security" camp, a medical unit and the guard units. Following the arrival of Night and Fog prisoners, the political section and "detention and security" camp were closed down.

Hinzert remained mainly autonomous until November 21, 1944, when it was administratively linked to the Buchenwald concentration camp. The camp was partially destroyed by an air raid on February 22, 1945, but remained in operation until March 3 of the same year when many of the surviving prisoners were sent on a death march to upper Hessen, others having been transferred to the Buchenwald concentration camp. The camp was discovered March 17, 1945, by reconnaissance units of the 94th Infantry Division. Only a handful of prisoners were still in the camp at that time.

== Camp commanders ==
On October 9, 1939, SS Standartenführer Hermann Pister assumed command over the camp, a position he held until December 1941 when he took over the command of the Buchenwald concentration camp and was replaced by SS Hauptsturmführer Egon Zill. Zill, who had previously served in the Dachau, Buchenwald and Ravensbrück concentration camps, was transferred to the Natzweiler concentration camp in Alsace in April 1942 as the camp's Deputy Commandant. He was replaced by the third and last commander of Hinzert, SS Hauptsturmführer Paul Sporrenberg.

After the war, Pister was convicted of war crimes at the Dachau trials and sentenced to death. He died of a heart attack before he could be executed. Zill was sentenced to life in prison by a West German court in the 1950s, which was reduced to 15 years on appeal. He was eventually released from prison, and died in 1974.

== Camp prisoners ==
Approximately 13,600 prisoners transited through Hinzert. The first prisoners were German workers who had worked on the Siegfried Line and had demonstrated "anti-social behavior". Shortly afterwards, the camp was used to host forced laborers from occupied countries. Beginning in 1941, large groups of prisoners were sent to Hinzert, mainly political prisoners from Luxembourg and France. Other prisoners, mainly forced laborers and POWs, were sent from Poland and the Soviet Union. Starting on December 7, 1941, when the Night and Fog directive was signed, NN prisoners transited through Hinzert on the way to larger concentration camps, such as Natzweiler, Dachau or Buchenwald where they would eventually "disappear".

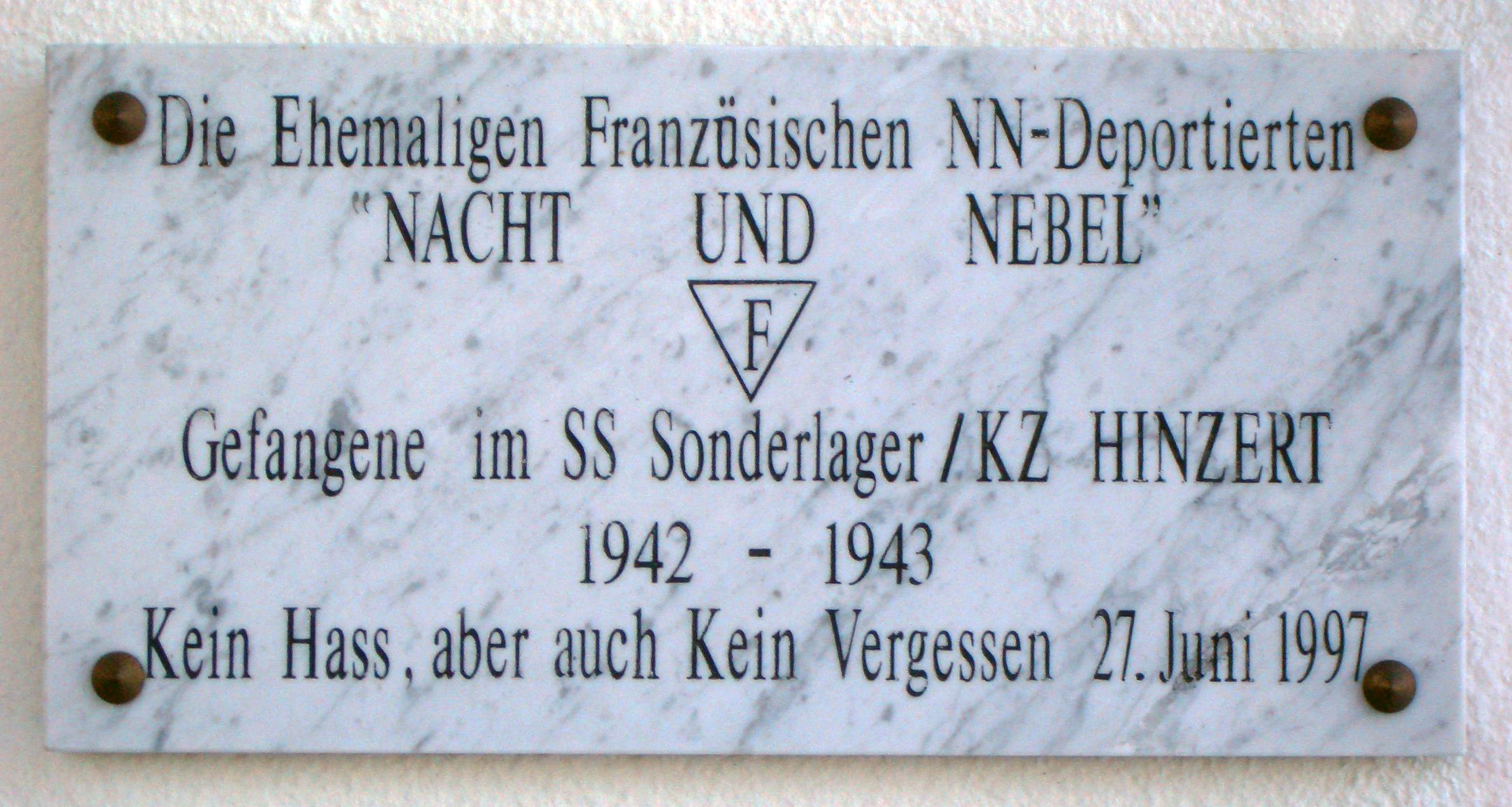
Hinzert commemorative plaque of the Night and Fog victims.

Many Hinzert prisoners were also used as slave labourers in SS subcamps spread out in the surrounding region. Some 23 Kommandos were attached to Hinzert including: Farschweiler, Finthen, Fluwig, Gelnhausen, Gusterath, Hermeskeil, Konz, Langendiebach, Mainz, Mariahute (1 and 2), Neubrucke, Hoppstaden, Nahe, Nonnweiler, Pollert, Primstal, Rheinsfeld (1 and 2), Wachtersbach and Waechtersbach. These Kommandos performed mainly maintenance forced-labour in air bases as well as marsh drainage and forestry work.

A number of internal Kommandos existed directly within the main camp:

1. from May to June 1942, "Swimming pool" Kommando dug a fish farming basin which was used as a fire extinguisher reserve;
2. in July 1942, "Stone" Kommando was created to excavate a neighbouring stone mine;
3. "Forest" Kommando worked in the forests surrounding the camps cutting down lumber for the camp and creating a road (due to high risk of prisoners escaping, this Kommando was disbanded in 1943);
4. "Cart" Kommando consisting of eighteen prisoners pulling a cart transported the unearthed roots and other material (the SS sometimes released the brakes of the cart when travelling downhill in order to kill or wound the prisoners);
5. "Coal" Kommando transported every day the contents of a coal rail carriage from the neighbouring railway station to the camp over a distance of 4 km (2.5 mi). The four trips represented a total of 32 km (20 mi);
6. "Wood" Kommando cleaned and chopped the unearthed roots in order to provide fuel for the camp
7. "Romika" and "Black" Kommandos worked in the camp workshops and produced rubber items and armament equipment from 1942 onwards.

Because of the secrecy concerning their condition, many Night and Fog prisoners were attached to these internal Kommandos. The camp had been built initially to house 560 prisoners but an average number of prisoners was 800. This number reached 1,600 at times.

== War crimes ==
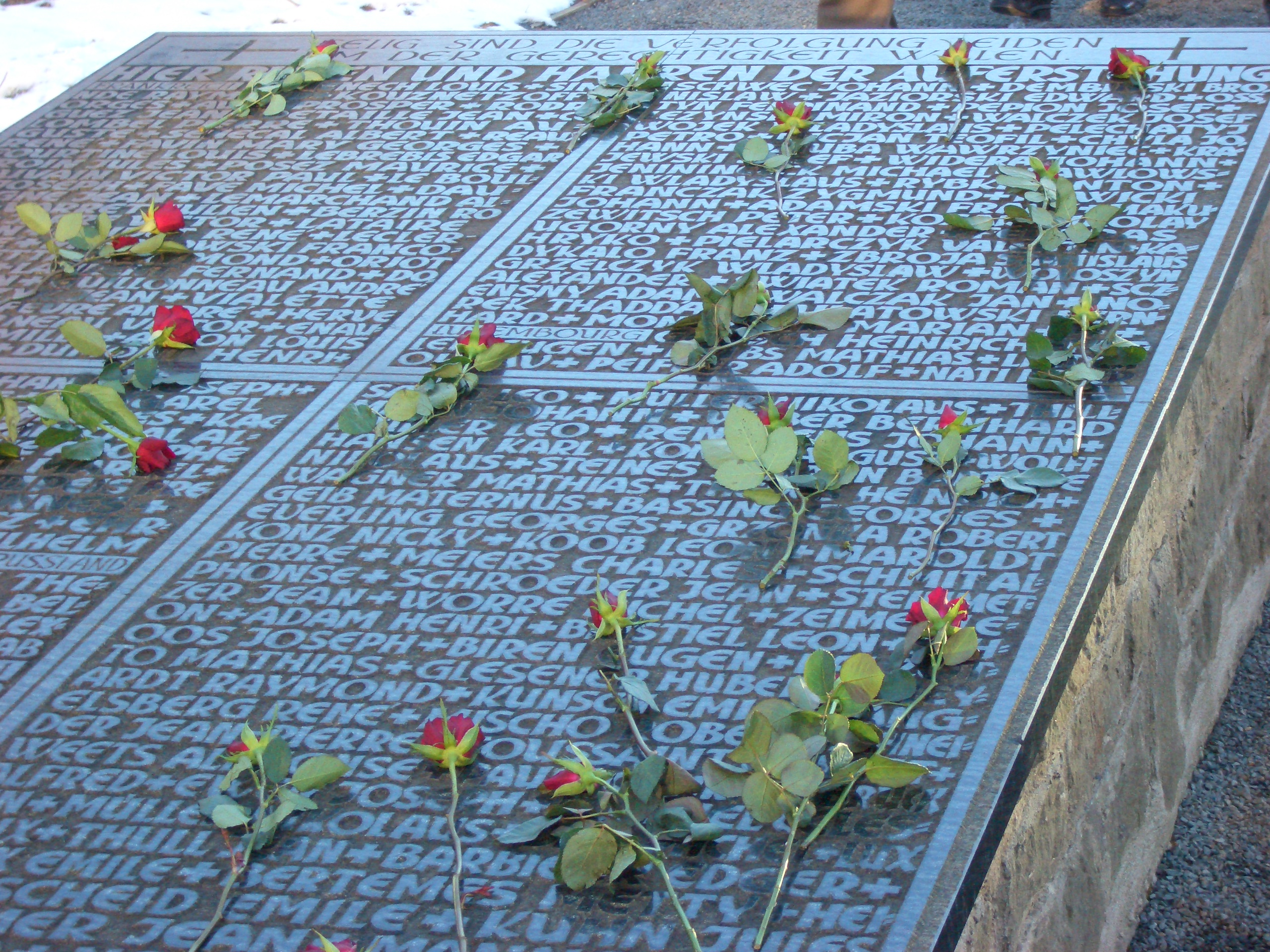
A catafalque bearing the names of those killed at KZ Hinzert has been erected on the site of the former concentration camp.

Prisoners of the Hinzert concentration camp were kept under very harsh conditions; beatings were delivered on a regular basis and torture and execution sessions took place in public in order to establish a climate of constant terror and fear.

Although the majority of the Hinzert prisoners were transferred to other camps or were kept imprisoned until their liberation, many were tortured and murdered at Hinzert. Despite its being "only" a transit camp, 321 prisoners were killed at Hinzert. The victims were often shot, drowned or killed by lethal injection. According to trial records, SS guards also tortured prisoners, left them to die of sickness or hunger, or fed them to dogs.

=== Murder operations ===
In 1941, two trucks transported 70 Soviet POWs to Hinzert. The prisoners were told that they would undergo a medical examination, but were injected with potassium cyanide, a deadly poison, and died shortly thereafter. They were buried in the neighboring forest.

Following the 1942 Luxembourgish general strike directed against the German occupier and a new directive that enrolled the Luxembourgish youth into the Wehrmacht, 20 strikers were arrested by the Gestapo, sentenced to death and shot between September 2 and 5, 1942. Among them was the boxer Ernest Toussaint. They were also buried nearby.

In the subsequent years, over 350 Luxembourgish resistance fighters were arrested by the Gestapo; 50 resistants were sentenced to death. Of these 50 sentences, 25 were carried out. However, of the remaining 25, 23 were subsequently executed as a response to acts of resistance in Luxembourg.

The exact number of victims murdered at Hinzert remains unknown. Between 1,600 and 1,800 Luxembourgers had been sent to Hinzert. The Luxembourg Conseil National de la Resistance has confirmed 321 deaths, including 82 Luxembourgers, but not all remains of murdered victims have been found. In 1946, following the liberation of the camp by the Allies, the remains of many of the aforementioned victims were found and transferred to their respective homelands with full national honors. Those not repatriated were buried on site in a memorial cemetery.

The bodies of the Luxembourgish victims were transferred back to Luxembourg on March 9–10, 1946. All along the way, citizens lined the roads, some wearing the striped uniform of camp prisoners, to pay tribute. The bodies were first laid temporarily at the Place d'Armes, in the center of the city of Luxembourg, where dignitaries paid their respects, and were then buried in the Notre-Dame Cemetery.

The French Fondation pour la Mémoire de la Déportation also estimates that approximately 1,500 Night and Fog prisoners were sent to Hinzert; 390 survived and returned to France and at least 804 died.

== Memorial ==
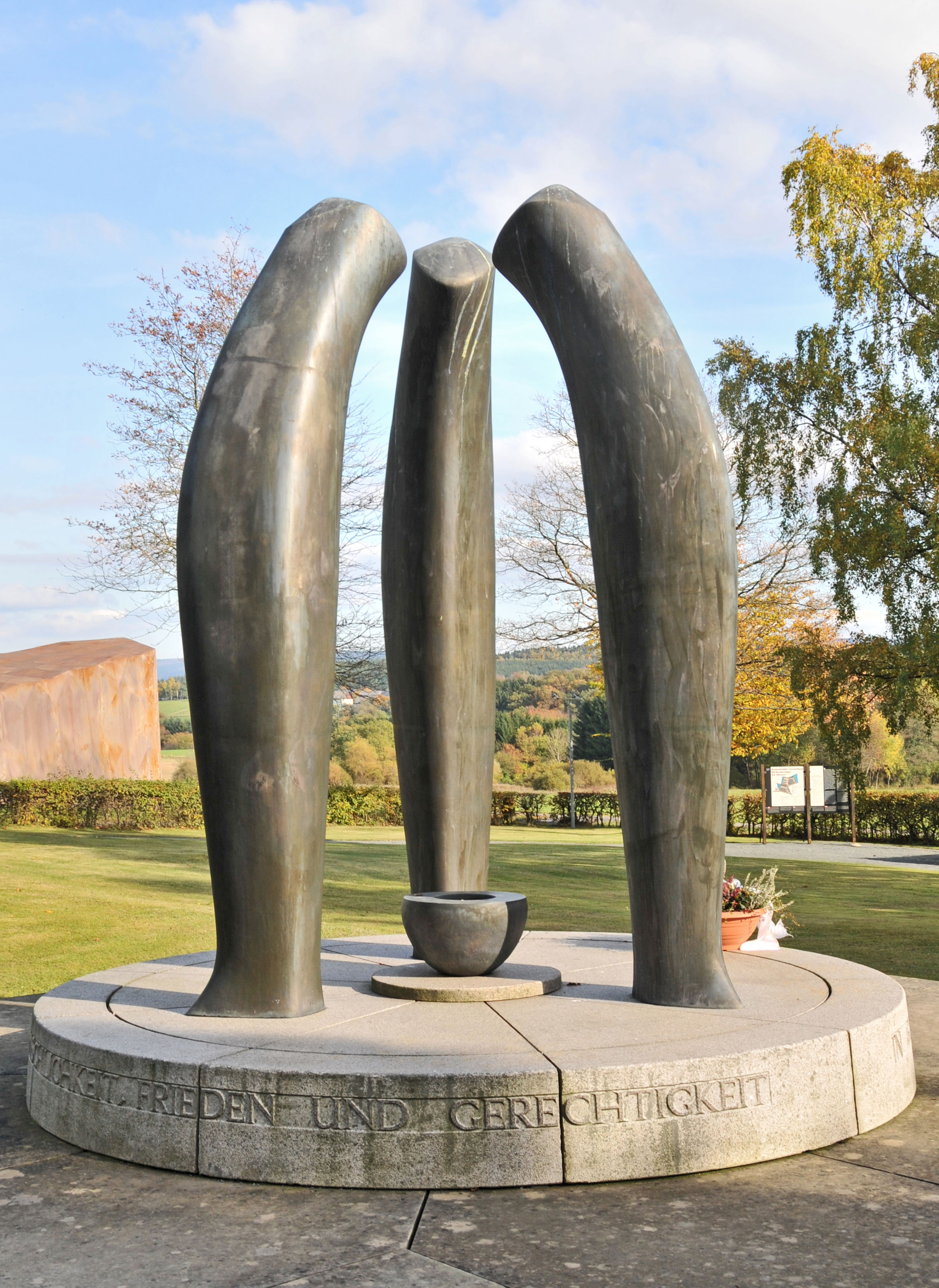
Bronze monument by Lucien Wercollier at the Hinzert Concentration Camp.

A bronze monument by the Luxembourgish sculptor Lucien Wercollier honors the prisoners and those murdered at the camp.

On December 10, 2005, a memorial and documentation center was opened on the site of the former concentration camp. Designed by the architect firm Wandel Hoefer Lorch & Hirsch, the steel modern building houses a permanent exhibition of camp artifacts, photos and explanation notes.

== See also ==
Media related to Hinzert concentration camp at Wikimedia Commons

- List of Nazi-German concentration camps
- German occupation of Luxembourg in World War II
