= Gaston Fayaud =

French boxer

Personal information
- Nationality: French
- Born: 7 September 1914; Limoges, Haute-Vienne, France
- Died: 6 October 1989 (aged 75); Limoges, Haute-Vienne, France

Sport
- Sport: boxing

Gaston Henri Fayaud (7 September 1914 – 6 October 1989) was a French boxer. Born in Limoges, he competed in the 1932 Summer Olympics and in the 1936 Summer Olympics.

== Career ==
In 1932, Fayaud lost in the first round to István Énekes in the flyweight competition. Four years later he was again eliminated in the first round of the flyweight class after losing his fight to Walter Siegfried.

Fayaud won the 1935 and 1936 Amateur Boxing Association British flyweight title.
