= Chester Rutecki =

American boxer

Chester J. Rutecki (August 8, 1916 – August 3, 1976) was an American boxer who competed in the 1936 Summer Olympics.

He was born in Chicago.

In 1936 he was eliminated in the second round of the welterweight class after losing his fight to the upcoming gold medalist Sten Suvio.
