= Fidel Tricánico =

Uruguayan boxer

Fidel Tricánico (5 May 1914 – 29 December 1992) was a Uruguayan boxer who competed in the 1936 Summer Olympics. In 1936 he was eliminated in the quarter-finals of the flyweight class after losing his fight to the upcoming gold medalist Willy Kaiser.

== 1936 Olympic results ==
- Round of 32: bye
- Round of 16: bye
- Quarterfinal: lost to Willy Kaiser (Germany) by decision
