= Hens Dekkers =

Dutch boxer

Heinrich "Hens" Gerardus Dekkers (May 6, 1915 – November 19, 1966) was a Dutch boxer who competed in the 1936 Summer Olympics in Berlin, Germany.

He was born in Rotterdam and died in The Hague. He was the older brother of Tin Dekkers.

In 1936 he was eliminated in the quarterfinals of the welterweight class after losing his fight to the upcoming silver medalist Michael Murach.

== 1936 Olympic results ==
Below is the record of Hens Dekkers, a Dutch welterweight boxer who competed at the 1936 Berlin Olympics:

- Round of 32: bye
- Round of 16: defeated Gaspard Deridder (Belgium) on points
- Quarterfinal: lost to Michael Murach (Germany) on points
