= Guillermo López =

Chilean boxer

Guillermo López (born August 4, 1914, date of death unknown) was a Chilean boxer. He competed in the 1936 Summer Olympics.

In 1936, López was eliminated in the second round of the flyweight class, after losing his fight to the upcoming gold medalist Willy Kaiser.

== 1936 Olympic results ==
Below is the record of Guillermo López, a Chilean flyweight boxer who competed at the 1936 Berlin Olympics:

- Round of 32: bye
- Round of 16: lost to Willy Kaiser (Germany) referee stopped the contest in the third round
