= William Passmore (boxer) =

South African boxer

William Ivor Passmore (22 June 1915 – 13 October 1986) was a South African boxer who competed in the 1936 Summer Olympics.

In 1936 he was eliminated in the quarter-finals of the flyweight class after losing his fight to Alfredo Carlomagno of Argentina.

== 1936 Olympic results ==
Below is the record of William Passmore, a South African flyweight boxer who competed at the 1936 Berlin Olympics:

- Round of 32: bye
- Round of 16: defeated Mahmoud Ezzat (Egypt) on points
- Quarterfinal: lost to Alfredo Carlomagno (Argentina) points
