= Walter Grieb =

Swiss boxer

Walter Grieb (born 3 February 1911, date of death unknown) is a Swiss boxer who competed in the 1936 Summer Olympics. In 1936 he was eliminated in the second round of the welterweight class after losing his fight to Roger Tritz of France.
