= Jin Guidi =

Chinese boxer

Jin Guidi (simplified Chinese: 靳贵第; traditional Chinese: 靳貴第; pinyin: Jìn Guìdì; 6 June 1915 – 1937), or Chin Kuai-Ti, was a Chinese soldier and boxer.

He competed for the Republic of China in the 1936 Summer Olympics. Jin Guidi encountered British middleweight boxing champion Richard Shrimpton. He became more and more courageous, making it difficult for Shrimpton to fight, and backed up frequently, winning the applause of his Chinese compatriots in the audience again and again. The frustrated British player became angry and violently knocked Jin Guidi to the ground with his left elbow. This was against the rules. Before Jin Guidi got up, he was hit again and fell again, bleeding in his mouth and nose, and his waist was injured. The British player's violations caused boos on the scene. The French referee convicted Shrimpton for a serious foul, and Jin Guidi won! However, the British referee Green ignored this decision and counter-judged Shrimpton to win. The Irish prosecutor also gave false testimony and the audience uproared, and the audience refused to leave. Chen Hanxiang, coach of the Chinese boxing team, protested angrily but it did not help and Jin was eliminated in the first round of the middleweight class.

Jin was killed in a battle against the Japanese army in 1937 during the Second Sino-Japanese War.
