= Chiyoto Nakano =

Japanese boxer

Chiyoto Nakano (Japanese: 中野 千代人; born 7 February 1913, date of death unknown) was a Japanese boxer who competed in the 1936 Summer Olympics in Berlin. In 1936 he was eliminated in the second round of the flyweight class after losing his fight to Alfredo Carlomagno.

== 1936 Olympic results ==
- Round of 32: bye
- Round of 16: lost to Alfredo Carlomagno (Argentina) by decision
