= Hans Zehetmayer =

Austrian boxer

Hans Zehetmayer (28 April 1909 – 8 May 1945) was an Austrian boxer who competed in the 1936 Summer Olympics. In 1936 he was eliminated in the second round of the middleweight class after losing his fight to the upcoming bronze medalist Raúl Villarreal. A policeman by profession, he died in the final days of World War II in Brno.
