= Thomas Arbuthnott =

New Zealand boxer

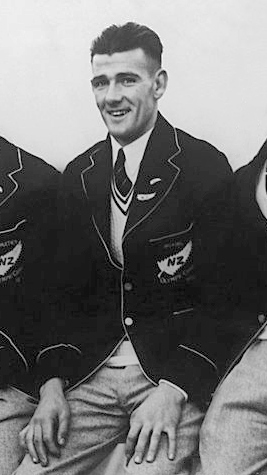
- Arbuthnott in 1936

Personal information
- Born: 29 June 1911 Glasgow, Scotland
- Died: 20 January 1995 (aged 83) New Zealand

Sport
- Sport: Boxing

Thomas Bone Arbuthnott (29 June 1911 – 20 January 1995) was a New Zealand welterweight boxer. He competed at the 1936 Summer Olympics, but was eliminated in his first bout.

Arbuthnott was born in Glasgow, Scotland, to David Arbuthnott and Mary Robertson, née Bone; he had five siblings. Arbuthnott married in 1939 to Phyllis Reeves; they had a daughter, Kay.
