= Felipe Nunag =

Filipino boxer

Personal information
- Born: March 23, 1916 Dansalan, Lanao del Sur, Philippine Islands (now Marawi, Lanao del Sur)
- Died: March 17, 1957 (aged 40) Balamban, Cebu, Philippines

Boxing career
- Weight class: Flyweight

Felipe "Boy" K. Nunag (March 23, 1916 – March 17, 1957) was a Filipino boxer who competed in the 1936 Summer Olympics at Berlin. He was eliminated in the second round of the flyweight class after losing his fight to Raoul Degryse.

He died in Cebu in the 1957 Cebu Douglas C-47 crash together with then president Ramon Magsaysay. He was aide de camp to president Ramon Magsaysay at the time of his death. He was a professor at the Philippine Military Academy.
