= Rudolf Kus =

Slovak boxer

Rudolf Kus (23 February 1915, Zábřeh – 3 July 2006, Bratislava) was a Slovak boxer who competed for Czechoslovakia in the 1936 Summer Olympics.

In 1936, he was eliminated in the second round of the heavyweight class after losing his fight to the upcoming gold medalist Herbert Runge.
