= Imre Mándi =

Hungarian boxer (1916–1943)

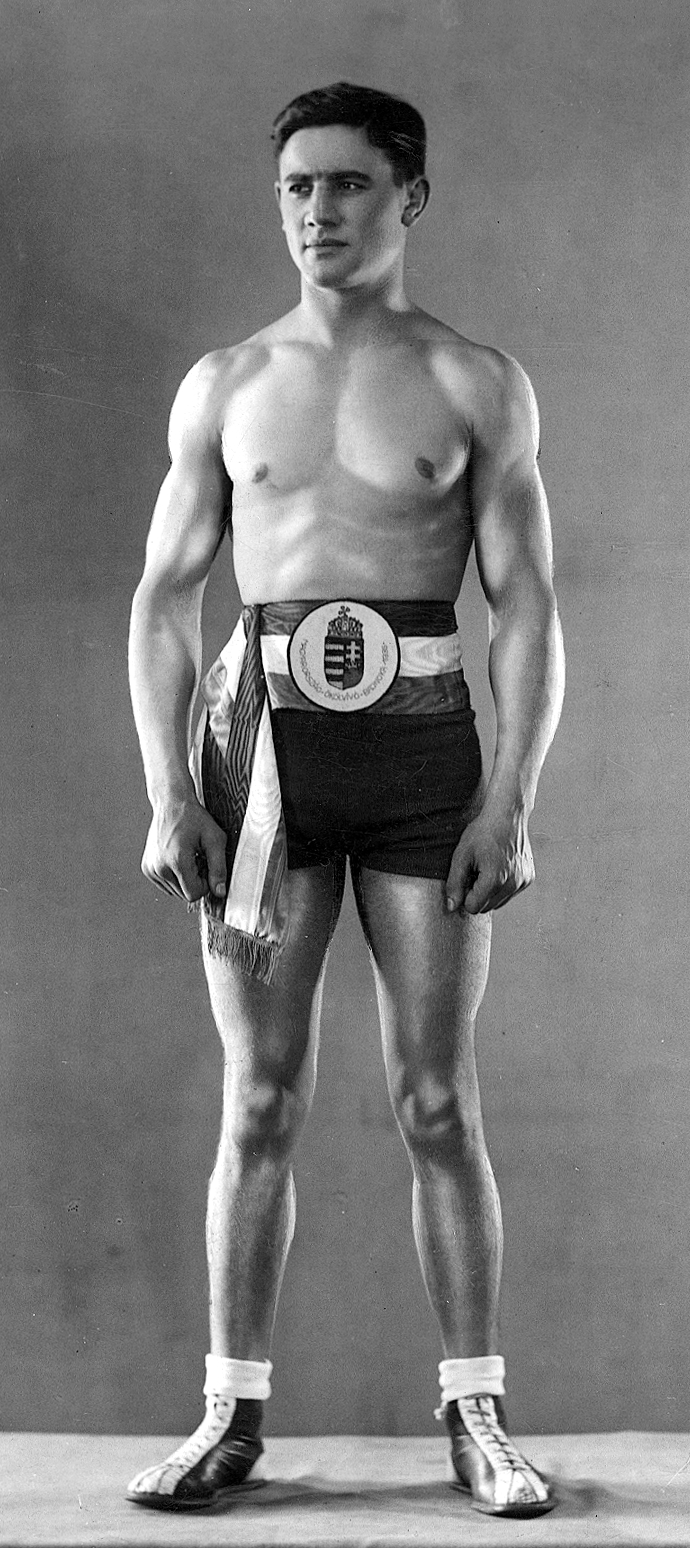
- Imre Mándi in 1935

Personal information
- Born: 24 November 1916
- Died: 1943 (aged 26–27)

Sport
- Sport: Boxing
- Club: Ferencvárosi TC, Budapest
Medal record
Representing Hungary
European Amateur Boxing Championships
Silver medal – second place	1937 Milan	-66.7 kg

Imre Mándi (Hungarian pronunciation: [ˈimrɛ ˈmaːndi]; 24 November 1916 – 1943) was a Hungarian boxer who competed in the 1936 Summer Olympics. He was eliminated in the quarterfinals of the welterweight class after losing his fight to the upcoming gold medalist Sten Suvio. Next year he won a silver medal at the European championships.

Mándi was Jewish and died in a Nazi labor camp during World War II.
