= Art Oliver =

American boxer

Personal information
- Full name: Arthur Oliver
- Nickname: "Art"
- Nationality: United States
- Born: March 25, 1911 Mississippi
- Died: June 1, 1944 (aged 33) Robertsdale, Hammond, Indiana

Sport
- Sport: Boxing
- Weight class: Heavyweight

Arthur Oliver (March 25, 1911 – June 1, 1944) was an American boxer who competed in the 1936 Summer Olympics. In 2016, the 1936 Olympic journey of the eighteen Black American athletes, including Oliver, was documented in the film Olympic Pride, American Prejudice.

Post competing in the 1936 Olympics, he left his brief career as a professional boxer to join the army and fight in World War II. After being honorably discharged he worked for American Maize Products Company.

He was born in Mississippi and died at the crossing in Robertsdale, southeast of Hammond, Indiana when the truck he was riding in collided with a passenger train.

In August 1935, while still an amateur he served as sparring partner for Joe Louis. In 1936 he represented Chicago at the Intercity Golden Gloves, which he won. In the same year Oliver attended the Olympics, where he was eliminated in the second round of the heavyweight class after losing his fight to Olle Tandberg.
