= Fernand Ciatti =

Luxembourgish boxer

Personal information
- Nationality: Luxembourg
- Born: Fernand Ciatti; 27 March 1912 Differdange, Luxembourg
- Died: 9 October 1989 (aged 77)
- Weight: Flyweight

Boxing career

Boxing record
- Wins: 0
- Win by KO: 0
- Losses: 1
- Draws: 0

Fernand Ciatti (27 March 1912 in Differdange – 9 October 1989) was a boxer from Luxembourg. Ciatti was member of the Luxembourg Olympic team at the 1936 Summer Olympics in Berlin. He got eliminated in the first round of the flyweight division on points by Danish Kaj Frederiksen.
