= Simplicio de Castro =

Filipino boxer

Personal information
- Born: January 13, 1914
- Died: January 1942 (aged 27–28) Bataan, Philippine Commonwealth

Simplicio de Castro (January 13, 1914 – January 1942) was a Filipino boxer who competed in the 1936 Summer Olympics. In 1936 he was eliminated in the quarterfinals of the welterweight class after losing his fight to Roger Tritz.

De Castro fought for his country during World War II and had the rank of lieutenant. He was part of the 1st Infantry Regiment under Alfredo Santos. He was killed in action during the 1942 Battle of the Pockets in Bataan.
