= Raúl Villarreal =

Argentine boxer

Olympic medal record

Men's Boxing
Bronze medal – third place	1936 Berlin	middleweight

Raúl Vicente Villarreal (born October 29, 1909, date of death unknown) was an Argentine boxer who competed in the 1936 Summer Olympics.

In 1936 he won the bronze medal in the middleweight class after winning the third-place fight against Henryk Chmielewski of Poland.

== 1936 Olympic results ==
- Round of 32: bye
- Round of 16: defeated Hans Zehetmayer (Austria) on points
- Quarterfinal: defeated Tin Dekkers (Netherlands) on points
- Semifinal: lost to Jean Despeaux (France) on points
- Bronze-Medal Bout: defeated Henryk Chmielewski (Poland) by walkover (was awarded the bronze medal)
