= 1942 Luxembourgish general strike =

Passive resistance in Luxembourg during WW2

Luxembourgish general strike of 1942
- Generalstreik vun 1942; Part of German occupation of Luxembourg during World War II
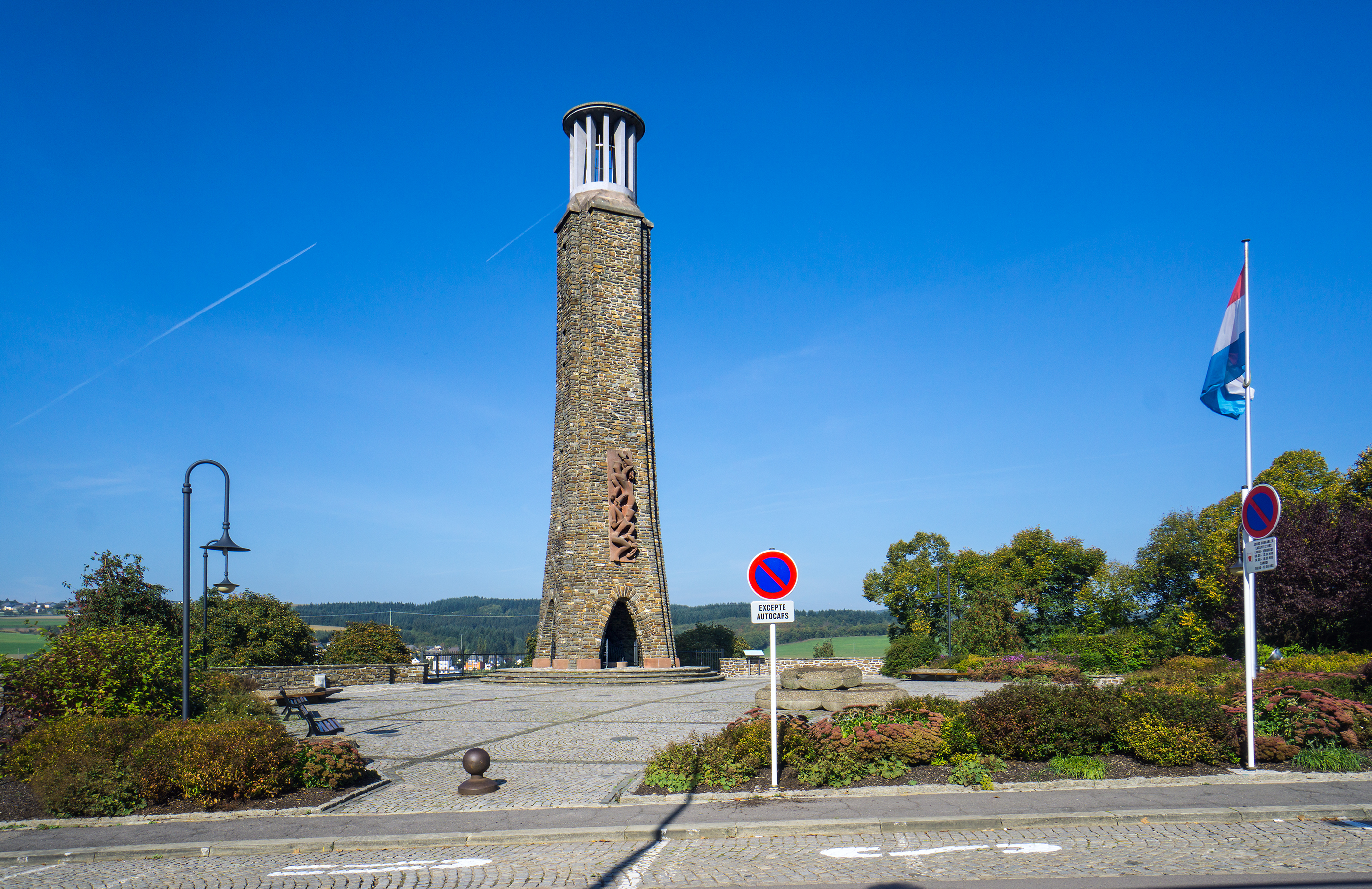
- The Strike Monument in Wiltz
- Date: August to September 1942
- Location: Civil Administration Area of Luxembourg
- Caused by: Opposition to Luxembourgers conscripting into the Wehrmacht
- Result: Strike violently suppressed

Parties
| Luxembourger workers | Government of Nazi Germany |

Lead figures
| Ernest Toussaint | Gustav Simon |

Casualties and losses
| 21 executed | |

The Luxembourgish general strike of 1942 (Luxembourgish: Generalstreik vun 1942) was a manifestation of passive resistance when Luxembourg was occupied by Nazi Germany during World War II. The strikes opposed a directive that conscripted young Luxembourgers into the Wehrmacht. A nationwide general strike, originating in Wiltz, paralysed the country and led to the occupying German authorities responding violently by sentencing 21 strikers to death.

== Origins ==
Following the German invasion of Luxembourg on May 10, 1940, Luxembourg was briefly placed under military occupation. On August 2, 1940, the military government was dissolved and replaced by a civilian government under the leadership of the German civilian administrator of the adjoining German district. The Luxembourg population was declared to be German and was to use German as its only language; the German authorities, under the orders of the Gauleiter Gustav Simon, developed a robust policy of Germanization. Furthermore, on August 30, 1942, Gustav Simon announced that all Luxembourger males born between 1920 and 1927 were to be conscripted into the Wehrmacht to fight against the Allies.

== The strike and its consequences ==
Reaction to the policies was swift among the Luxembourg population, especially against the conscription policy. Within hours, a number of Luxembourgers discussed possibilities and decided to organize a general strike. Leaflets calling for the strike were printed and distributed clandestinely throughout the country by resistants. On August 31, 1942, the strike officially began in the northern Ardennes town of Wiltz with a gathering of local Luxembourg town officials, led by local town officials Michel Worré and Nicolas Müller, refusing to go to work. They were gradually joined by other local workers, among them the employees of IDEAL Lederwerke Wiltz, a large industrial tannery belonging to the Adler & Oppenheimer group before "Aryanisation". News on the strike spread rapidly.

Soon, workers from the southwestern industrial towns of Schifflange and Differdange were alerted and also refused to go to work. In Schifflange, Hans Adam, a worker of German origins sounded the alarm across the valley to alert all workers.

In Differdange, news of the strike spread throughout the workforce by word of mouth, and increased in intensity on September 1. On September 2, 156 mill workers refused to take their shift, and many of those who were already working stopped. The German directors of the mill warned the millworkers that they could be killed for their actions. A few workers got back to work, but approximately 50 still refused, and declared they were on strike. At 10 a.m., German authorities reacted and designated who they held as responsible for the situation: Jean-Paul Schneider, Nicolas Betz, Alphonse Weets, Robert Mischo, René Angelsberg, and Ernest Toussaint. The six men were arrested, tried by a special tribunal, sentenced to death, and deported to the Hinzert concentration camp where they were shot. Their families were sent to prison and work camps in Germany.

The strike spread also to Esch-sur-Alzette, the capital of the Luxembourg mining area, all aspects of the administration were paralysed, including administration, agriculture, industry and education structures.

The central post office in Luxembourg received rumours of the strike in the morning, and received formal confirmation of the strike by early afternoon, which disrupted the distribution of mail that evening and the following day.

Throughout the country, schoolchildren were kept away from school, teachers refused to teach, laborers refused to work, there was no or little production of steel, milk, and other products.

Although the exact number of strikers is unknown, the movement did have a strong effect on the country and the occupying forces, and revitalized resistance movements. The strike was also widely publicized internationally by the allied press.

== German reaction to the strike ==
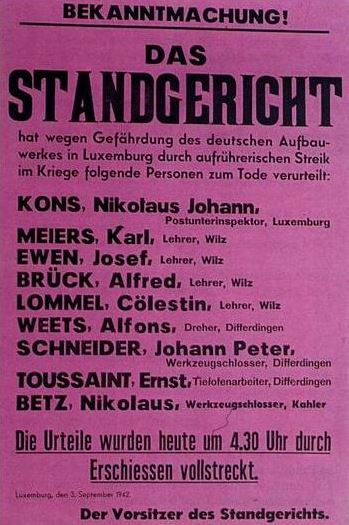
German poster announcing the executions

Fearing a further escalation of protests, German authorities decided to react in the harshest way to the strike. Within hours, the strike leaders were rounded up and interrogated by the Gestapo. They were formally arrested soon thereafter, on September 1, and interned in local prisons. Twenty strike leaders were summarily tried by a special tribunal (Standgericht) and sentenced to death and transferred to the Hinzert concentration camp where they were shot and buried in an unmarked grave. Hans Adam, who had rung the alarm in Schifflange and had German origins, was considered to be a traitor and was thus decapitated. Two thousand Luxembourgers were arrested, 83 were tried by the special tribunal and transferred to the Gestapo. 290 high school children, boys and girls, were arrested and sent to re-education camps in Germany, as were 40 ARBED trainees and 7 young postmen.

The first two strikers to be shot, on September 2, 1942, at 18:30, were Michel Worré and Nicolas Müller, from Wiltz. Their last words, according to an SS who witnessed the execution, were "Vive Lëtzebuerg" (Long live Luxembourg!).

A series of black on red posters were then posted throughout Luxembourg announcing the death of the strikers as a consequence of the strike, bearing the names, occupation, and residency of each victim. Their families, including their children, were subsequently transferred to forced resettlement camps, such as Schlauphof (Lager 112) in Silesia, under very harsh conditions.

== Executed persons ==
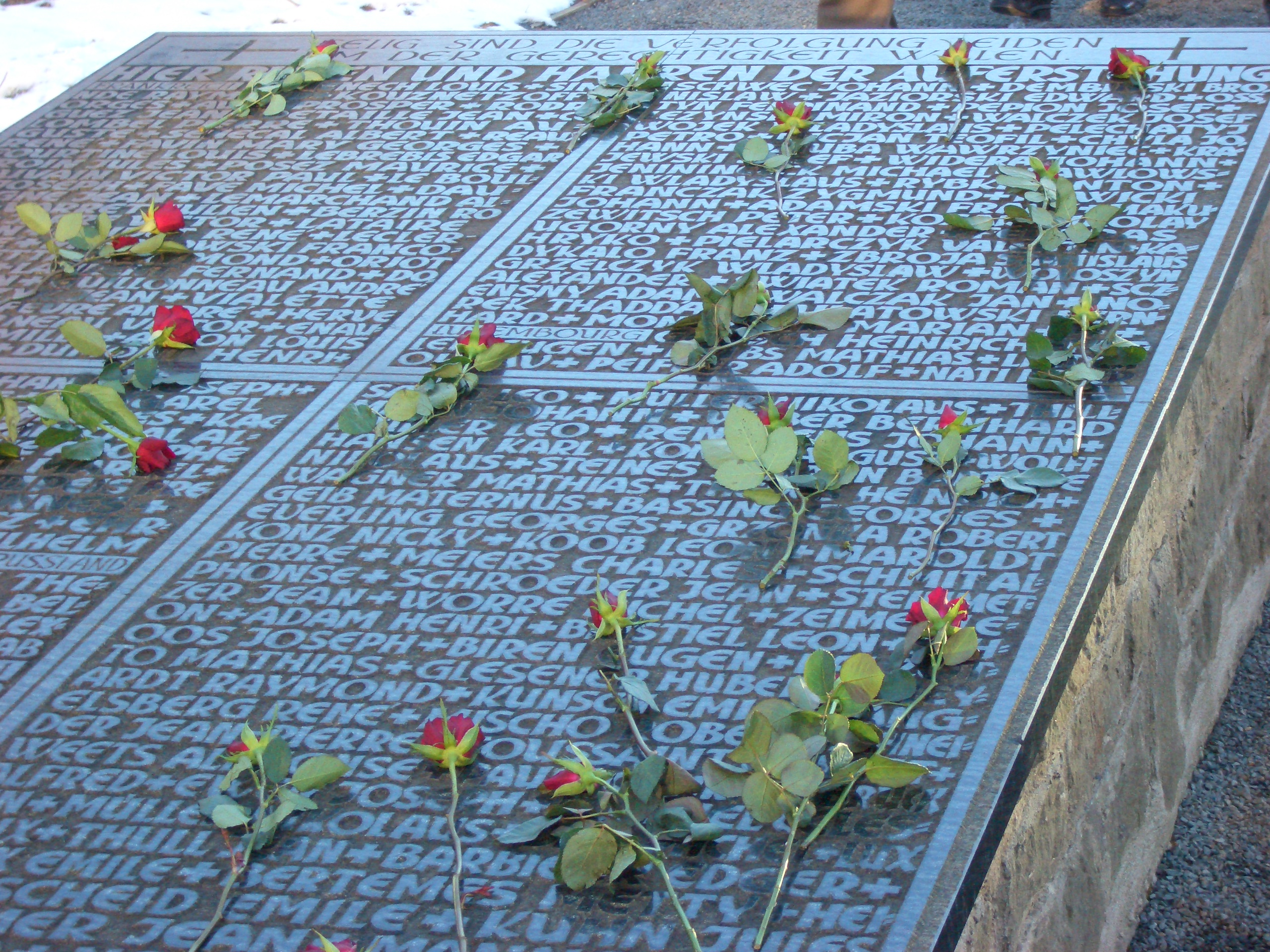
The names of the victims of the strike who were executed at Hinzert are among those inscribed on a catafalque at the site of the concentration camp

The Luxembourg spelling of the names is respected

- Strikers executed on September 2, 1942
  - Michel Worré – Head of the local economic council, Wiltz
  - Nicolas Müller – Secretary of the local authority, Wiltz
- Strikers executed on September 3, 1942
  - Nicolas Kons – Postal Underinspector, Luxembourg
  - Charles Meyers – Teacher, Wiltz
  - Josy Ewen – Teacher, Wiltz
  - Alfred Brück – Teacher, Wiltz
  - Célestin Lommel – Teacher, Wiltz
  - Alphonse Weets – Turner, Differdange
  - Jean-Paul Schneider – Toolmaker, Differdange
  - Ernest Toussaint – Miner, Differdange
  - Nicolas Betz – Toolmaker, Kahler
- Strikers executed on September 4, 1942
  - Léon Zeimes – Typographer, Itzig
  - Robert Mischo – Worker, Differdange
  - René Angelsberg – Worker, Differdange
  - Jean Schroeder – Postman, Luxembourg City
- Strikers executed on September 5, 1942
  - Michel Dax – Railway worker, Ettelbruck
  - Emile Heiderscheid – Worker, Diekirch
  - Alphonse Schmit – Professor, Echternach
  - Jean Thull – Railway worker, Ettelbruck
- Strikers executed on September 9, 1942
  - Eugène Biren – Schifflange
- Other executed strikers
  - Henri Adam – Worker, Schifflange, executed by decapitation in Cologne.

== Commemoration of the strike ==
The 1942 Luxembourg general strike strongly marked Luxembourg's resistance to the German occupier. Each year, the strike is commemorated on August 31 by the head of state and government officials.

In 1965, a lighthouse-shaped "National Monument to the Strike" was opened in Wiltz. Luxembourg's most famous 20th-century sculptor Lucien Wercollier created the two reliefs on the lighthouse displayed there. Wercollier was himself imprisoned at the Hinzert concentration camp.

== See also ==
- Luxembourgish Resistance,
- February strike of 1941, protesting against the German anti-Jewish measures in the Netherlands,
- Strike of the 100,000 of 1941 in south-eastern Belgium,
- Milk strike of September 1941 against food rationing in Occupied Norway.
