= Josef Hrubeš =

Czechoslovak boxer

Josef Hrubeš (born 26 September 1916; date of death unknown) was a Czechoslovak boxer who competed in the 1936 Summer Olympics for Czechoslovakia. He was born in Slaný. In 1936 he was eliminated in the quarter-finals of the middleweight class after losing his fight to the upcoming gold medalist Jean Despeaux.
