= Tin Dekkers =

Dutch boxer

Gerardus Cornelis "Tin" Dekkers (September 18, 1916 – October 8, 2005) was a Dutch boxer who competed in the 1936 Summer Olympics.

He was born in Rotterdam and was the younger brother of Hens Dekkers.

In 1936 he was eliminated in the quarterfinals of the middleweight class after losing his fight to the upcoming bronze medalist Raúl Villarreal. He died in Orp-Jauche, Belgium in 2005.
