= Leonard Cook =

Australian boxer

Rusty Cook
Personal information
- Nickname: Rusty
- Nationality: Australian
- Born: Arthur Leonard Cook; 20 April 1913 New South Wales, Australia
- Died: 10 October 1991 (aged 78)

Boxing career

Arthur Leonard "Rusty" Cook (20 April 1913 – 10 October 1991) was an Australian boxer. Cook won Australia's first ever Empire/Commonwealth Games boxing gold medal in the 1934 British Empire Games in London, after defeating Welshman Frank Taylor in the final of the Lightweight division. He competed in the 1936 Summer Olympics in Berlin, but was eliminated in the second round of the welterweight class after losing his fight to the Finnish fighter Sten Suvio, the eventual Gold Medallist.

In July 1938 Cook announced he was going professional. He had 3 professional fights in Queensland for 3 wins before taking on the seasoned N.S.W fighter Alan Westbury in Brisbane on 27 January 1939 for the vacant Australian Welterweight title. However Westbury knocked Cook out in the 3rd Round to win the title. Cook had one further bout on 3 March 1939 against Bobby Arlene, recording a 12th Round KO victory. He had agreed to fight Ron McLachlan in May, but at the beginning of that month made the abrupt decision to retire from boxing at the age of 27 due to competing business interests.
