= Willy Kaiser =

German boxer

Medal record

Men's Boxing

Representing Germany

Olympic Games
Gold medal – first place	1936 Berlin	flyweight

Wilhelm "Willi" Kaiser (16 January 1912 – 24 July 1986) was a German boxer who competed in the 1936 Summer Olympics.

Kaiser was born in Pudewitz, Province of Posen, German Empire. He won the gold medal in the flyweight class after winning the final against Gavino Matta in 1936.

== 1936 Olympic results ==
Below is the record of Willi Kaiser, a German flyweight boxer who competed at the 1936 Berlin Olympics:

- Round of 32: Bye
- Round of 16: Defeated Guillermo López (Chile) referee stopped contest in round 3
- Quarterfinal: Defeated Fidel Tricánico (Uruguay) on points
- Semifinal: Defeated Alfredo Carlomagno (Argentina) on points
- Final: Defeated Gavino Matta (Italy) on points (won gold medal)
