= Emilio Ballado =

Mexican boxer (born 1916)

Personal information
- Born: 2 May 1916 Veracruz, Mexico

Boxing career

Boxing record
- Total fights: 2
- Losses: 1
- Draws: 1
Medal record
Central American and Caribbean Games
Gold medal – first place	1935 El Salvador	Welterweight

Emilio Ballado Alvarado (born 2 May 1916, date of death unknown) was a Mexican boxer who represented his native country in the 1935 Central American and Caribbean Games and in the 1936 Summer Olympics.

== Amateur career ==
In the 1935 Central American and Caribbean Games, staged in San Salvador, El Salvador, Ballado won the gold medal in the welterweight class —67 to 69 kg (148 to 152 lb)— against Panamanian pugilist Alberto Allan. One year later, in the 1936 Summer Olympics celebrated in Berlin, Germany, he was eliminated in the first round of the welterweight class after losing his fight to Norwegian pugilist Rudolf Andreassen.

== Boxing record ==
0 Wins, 1 Lost (1 knockouts), 1 Draw
Res.	Record	Opponent	Type	Rd., Time	Date	Location	Notes
Lost	0-1-1	(Mexico) Eddie Cerda	—N/a	10	1939-05-17	Arena Nacional, Mexico City.	TKO 10.
Draw	0-0-1	(Mexico) Frankie Zavalza		12	1937-04-10	(Mexico) Arena Nilo, Guadalajara, Jalisco.	Points: 10-10.
—N/a	—N/a	(Mexico) Rafael Nava	—N/a	—N/a	—N/a	(Mexico) Teatro Emilio Rabasa, Tuxtla Gutiérrez, Chiapas.	Mentioned in Historia del Teatro Emilio Rabasa (1883-1945).
