= Walter Marti =

Swiss boxer

Walter Marti (1 April 1910 – 28 March 1992) was a Swiss boxer who competed in the 1936 Summer Olympics. In 1936, he was eliminated in the second round of the heavyweight class after losing his fight to the upcoming bronze medalist Erling Nilsen.
