= Hans Aasnæs =

Norwegian army officer and shooter (1902–1965)

Hans Aasnæs OBE
- Born: 15 December 1902; Sande Municipality in Vestfold, Norway
- Died: 4 July 1965 (aged 62); Oslo, Norway
- Spouses: Eleanor Chambers Poulsson (m. 1928; died 1933) Astrid With (m. 1936)
- Relatives: Håkon Aasnæs (cousin); Bror With (brother-in-law)
- Military career
- Allegiance: Norway
- Branch: Norwegian Army
- Service years: 1923–1947
- Rank: Major
- Units: 1st Division (1923–1930); Norwegian Brigade (1941–1945)
- Commands: 2nd Battalion of the 10th Infantry Regiment (1940)
- Conflicts: Second World War: Norwegian Campaign (POW)
- Awards: Haakon VII 70th Anniversary Medal; Order of the British Empire
- Other work: Lawyer, shooting champion

Hans Aasnæs (15 December 1902 – 4 July 1965) was a Norwegian lawyer and army officer, and international sport shooter.

A member of the Norwegian Army during the Second World War, Aasnæs fought against Nazi Germany during the Norwegian Campaign, eventually as battalion commander, until May 1940. Joining the exiled Norwegian forces in the United Kingdom in 1941, he served as chief of staff of the Norwegian Brigade in Scotland in 1944. He was awarded the Norwegian Haakon VII 70th Anniversary Medal, and was made an Officer of the Order of the British Empire.

A sport shooter, he participated in numerous national and international shooting championships, winning a total of 29 national titles in various shooting disciplines, and was awarded the kongepokal trophy six times. He competed in five Olympic Games between 1936 and 1960, with a 5th place in trap at the 1960 Summer Olympics in Rome as best result. He won a world champion title in individual 100 metre running deer double shot event in 1947, and won several world championship medals during his career.

== Personal life ==
Aasnæs was born in Sande Municipality in Vestfold, the son of farmers Hans Alfred Aasnæs and Anna Kristine Freberg. On 2 May 1928, he married Kristiania-born Eleanor Chambers Poulsson, with whom he had one child before she died in 1933. In 1936 he married Astrid With, with whom he had two children. Through her, Hans Aasnæs was a brother-in-law of wartime resistance member and engineer Bror With. He was also a cousin of fellow Olympic sport shooter Håkon Aasnæs. Hans Aasnæs died in Oslo in 1965.

== Career ==
=== Early civilian and military career ===
Aasnæs graduated from the upper section of the Norwegian Military Academy in 1923, joining the 1st Division with the rank of first lieutenant. He served with the 14th Infantry Regiment, before transferring to the 1st Infantry Regiment in 1924. Having taken a course as an aviation scout at Kjeller Airport in 1925, he was transferred to the reserves in 1930.

In civilian life, Aasnæs achieved his examen artium academic certification in 1920, and graduated with a cand.jur. law degree in 1925, which qualified him for work in the superior courts in 1927. After further studies in England, France and Denmark from 1926 to 1927, he was employed as an office manager at the cooperative insurance agency "Felleskontoret for Brandforsikring".

=== 1930s ===
At the Norwegian national shooting championships, between 1934 and 1960, Aasnæs won a total of 29 gold medals in seven different shooting disciplines. He was also awarded the King's Cup six different years, the first time in 1934. He competed at the 1936 Summer Olympics in Berlin, where he placed ninth in 25 metre rapid fire pistol event. At the 1937 World Championships he won a silver medal in the running deer double shot event, and a bronze medal in the running deer single shot event. Aasnæs was a member of the Norwegian Officers' Pistol Club, the Oslo Sport Shooters and the Hunting Shooter Club.

=== Second World War ===
Aasnæs was an army officer by profession. Following the German invasion of Norway on 9 April 1940, he fought in the Norwegian Campaign at Valdres. At the time of the campaign he held the rank of captain. Aasnæs arrived in Valdres on 25 April 1940, and assumed command of Company 7, 2nd Battalion of the 10th Infantry Regiment. The day prior to Aasnæs' arrival, the company had been thrown back from their positions in heavy fighting with advancing German units, losing their commander. After leading the company in heavy fighting for several days, the battalion commander, Major Leonard Sæter, was wounded, and Aasnæs was promoted to command the entire 2nd Battalion on 30 April. As the Norwegian forces' situation became more desperate, Aasnæs and fellow battalion commander, Captain Olav B. Skaathun, agreed to merge the remains of their units in the area of Vestre Slidre Municipality, in an attempt to continue resistance against the German advance. However, the commander of the Norwegian forces in Valdres, Colonel Gudbrand Østbye, realized his forces were in an unwinnable position, and ordered their capitulation on 1 May 1940. On 3 May 1940, the officers were sent by buses to Oslo, while the non-commissioned officers and men were sent by train to a prisoner-of-war camp at Hvalsmoen. The Norwegian prisoners of war from the Valdres front were released from captivity in groups during May and June 1940, the last officers being released in mid-June.

In 1941 Aasnæs made his way to the United Kingdom and joined the exiled Norwegian forces there, initially assuming command of a company of the Norwegian Brigade in Scotland. In 1942 he was promoted to the rank of major. One of his former soldiers would later describe Aasnæs as "... a strict but good company commander." From February to August 1944 he served as chief of staff of the Norwegian Brigade in Scotland.

During his time in exile, Aasnæs was involved in several conflicts with other exiled Norwegians. In addition to repeatedly criticising the Norwegian government in exile, he was one of a very few officers to criticise the exiled army's first commander, General Carl Gustav Fleischer, whom Aasnæs described as "... tired and worn by all the difficulties in the first time in England ...," and "... at the moment not fully able to build a Norwegian army in the United Kingdom ...." In the last months of the war, Aasnæs was angered by the Norwegian authorities decision to retain the Norwegian Brigade in Scotland, rather than deploy it to the front during the final battles against Germany. The Minister of Foreign Affairs during much of the period in exile, Trygve Lie, later described Aasnæs as "... a right-minded, somewhat conservative man ...." Lie also stated that Aasnæs was "honest", and "... a true patriot who saw it as his obligation to speak out."

=== Post war ===
Having left the army that year, Aasnæs became the World Champion in the individual 100 metre running deer double shot event in 1947. He was also part of the Norwegian team that won a silver medal in the running deer double shot event, and bronze medal in the running deer single shot event. At the 1949 World Championships, he won a gold medal with the Norwegian team in the running deer combined event. In 1952, he won two team gold medals at the World Championships, in the running deer single shot and double shot events. At the 1954 World Championships he won a bronze medal in Olympic trap.

He competed in five Olympic Games, with a 5th place in trap at the 1960 Summer Olympics in Rome as best result.

== Honours and awards ==
In addition to his numerous shooting awards and medals, Aasnæs was awarded the Norwegian Haakon VII 70th Anniversary Medal, and was made an Officer of the Order of the British Empire for his wartime service.
