= Alfred Russell (boxer) =

British boxer

Alf Russell
Personal information
- Nationality: England
- Born: Alfred Russell; 25 January 1915 Rotherham, England
- Died: 27 March 1966 (aged 51) Rotherham, England
- Weight: Flyweight

Boxing career

Boxing record
- Total fights: 5
- Wins: 5
- Win by KO: 0
- Losses: 6
- Draws: 0

Alfred Russell (25 January 1915 – 27 March 1966) was a British boxer who competed in the 1936 Summer Olympics. He fought as Alf Russell.

== Boxing career ==
In 1936 he competed in the Olympic Games and was eliminated in the first round of the flyweight class after losing his fight to Asbjørn Berg-Hansen.

Russell won the 1938 Amateur Boxing Association British flyweight title, when boxing without the affiliation of a club at the time.
