= Rudolf Bezděk =

Czechoslovak boxer

Rudolf Bezděk (born February 12, 1916, date of death unknown) was a boxer who competed for Czechoslovakia in the 1936 Summer Olympics in Berlin. In 1936, he was eliminated in the first round of the flyweight class after losing his fight to the upcoming bronze medalist Louis Laurie.
