= Zdeňka Bezděková =

Czech writer, philosopher, and translator

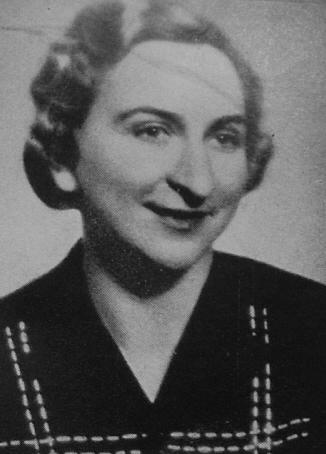
- Zdeňka [nee Vondrušková] Bezděková, circa 1940
- Born: Zdeňka Vondrušková; 19 April 1907; České Budějovice, Austria-Hungary
- Died: 12 August 1999 (aged 92); České Budějovice, Czech Republic
- Known for: Writer
- Notable work: Říkali mi Leni

Zdeňka Bezděková (19 April 1907 – 12 August 1999) née Vondrušková, was a Czech writer, philosopher, and translator. She was largely known for writing Říkali mi Leni about a Czech girl living in post-war Germany.

== Early life ==
Bezděková graduated from the girls' grammar school in České Budějovice, Czech Republic, and went on to study philosophy and literature in Prague and Paris, graduating in 1931.

She first married on 22 June 1929 in Prague, to grammar school professor František Bezděk. They divorced in 1930.

== Career ==
Since 1933 she taught, first at secondary school level, then at a grammar school in České Budějovice. After the Second World War she was a teacher in Sušice and Prague. From 1949 she taught Czech literature at the Faculty of Education of the university in České Budějovice (now the University of South Bohemia in České Budějovice), where she later headed the Department of Philology. She retired in 1962.

== Bibliography ==
=== Fiction ===
- Bezbranný vítěz (román; V Praze, Práce 1947, České Budějovice, Růže 1973).
- Říkali mi Leni (román dítěte; V Praze, Práce 1948, SNDK 1959, 1962, 1967, Albatros 1971, 1975 2001, 2012, Práce 1983, Č. Budějovice, Jih 1997).
- Já, město Mokroves (Román; Praha, Práce, 1952)
- Štěstí přijde zítra (Praha, SNDK, 1960).
- O červené kuličce (ilustrace Zdeněk Miler; Praha, Mladá fronta 1963).
- Vrátím se (autor Anton Ingolič, překlad ze slovinštiny Zdeňka Bezděková-Pavlíková; Praha, NPL 1966).
- Lásky nedočkavé (Praha, Práce 1970).
- Železný prsten (ze slovinštiny přeložila Zdeňka Bezděková; Praha, Albatros 1970).
- Prázdniny v Tanapu (Plzeň, Západočes. nakl. 1973).
- Věčný Oněgin (České Budějovice, Růže, 1973).
- Marta věří na zázrak (Praha, Albatros 1974).
- Děvčátko Zdena a moudrý pes (Praha, Albatros 1977).
- Bílá paní: Obnovený obraz (Praha, Československý spisovatel 1979).
- Štěstí přijde zítra (Praha, Albatros 1979).
- Zpěváček z Voňavé meze (ilustrace Ota Janeček; Praha, Albatros, 1979
- Bludný kámen (Praha, Československý spisovatel 1986).
- Orlík, hrad na skále (Obrazy z konce 15. století; České Budějovice, Jih).
- Můj život s knihou (České Budějovice, Jih 1995).

=== Non-fiction ===
- Stará literatura česká (Praha, Státní pedagogické nakladatelství 1952, 1954, 1957).
- Literatura pro mládež (pro posluchače Vyšší školy pedagogické; Praha, SPN 1954, 1955, 1957).
- Literatura doby obrozenské (Určeno pro posluchače vyšší pedagické školy a DS; Praha, SPN, 1956) Zobrazení exemplářů s možností jejich objednání.
