= Louis Laurie =

American boxer

Medal record

Men's Boxing

Representing the United States

Olympic Games
Bronze medal – third place	1936 Berlin	Flyweight

Louis Daniel Laurie (November 19, 1917 – December 26, 2002) was an American professional boxer who competed in the 1936 Summer Olympics.

In 1936, he won the bronze medal in the flyweight class after winning the third-place fight against Alfredo Carlomagno. At the time, the two losing semifinalists met in a bout for the bronze medal.

== Personal ==
Laurie was born to an Italian father and a Slovak mother in Cleveland, Ohio. Lou graduated from East Technical High School and went to work as a service station attendant. He was acrobatic champion of Cleveland for two years.

== Amateur career ==
Although he competed in only 22 amateur bouts, Laurie accomplished a great deal during that time. He went to Berlin with the Olympic team where he won three out of his four bouts, earning the bronze medal. So impressive was Laurie's boxing style that he was requested to give an exhibition. He remained in Germany two months and was presented with the Val Barker trophy for being the most scientific boxer in all classes that year.

From Berlin, Lou travelled to Hamburg. Then he went to Le Havre, France. Then to Cobb, Ireland, Plymouth, England and parts of Holland.

== 1936 Olympic results ==
Below is the record of Louis Laurie, an American flyweight boxer who competed at the 1936 Berlin Olympics:

- Round of 32: Defeated Rudolf Bezděk (Czechoslovakia) on points
- Round of 16: Defeated Asbjørn Berg-Hansen (Norway) on points
- Quarterfinal: Defeated Edmund Sobkowiak (Poland) on points
- Semifinal: Lost to Gavino Matta (Italy) on points
- Bronze-Medal bout: Defeated Alfredo Carlomagno (Argentina) by walkover (was awarded bronze medal)

== Professional career ==
When Laurie came back home in 1937, he turned pro under the care of Sam Barber, who had started Paul Perrone. Under Sam, Lou fought eight battles, losing two of them.

He went to Chicago where he had six bouts under Jack Hurley's banner. After defeating Eddie Lander, he returned home, got his old job back pumping gas and gave up boxing for one year. Then, heeding the advice of his friend, Max Minnich, once a promising heavyweight, Lou Laurie re-entered the boxing game - and won a six-round decision at the Ridgewood Grove.

Jack Bluman, manager of Julie Kogan, was then handling the affairs of the clever battler. He continued as a featherweight though his ambitions were to compete in the bantamweight division.

He retired in 1941 after a relatively unsuccessful career, having won 5, lost 8, and drawn 1.

== Return to boxing ==
Laurie returned to Europe and re-entered the ring briefly while serving in the Army during World War II.

== Retirement ==
After the war, Laurie worked as a machinist.

== Honors ==
He was inducted into the Greater Cleveland Sports Hall of Fame in 1984. Four years later, the Ohio State Former Boxers and Associates gave him a similar honor.

== Death ==
Laurie, 85, died December 26, 2002, at Beachwood Nursing and Health Care Center. Survivors included one son, Joseph.

== Trivia ==
- Laurie was one of five athletes from Cleveland's East Technical High School to compete in the 1936 Olympics. Teammate Jesse Owens won four gold medals in track events. Dave Albritton won the silver in the high jump, and Jack Wilson did the same in bantamweight boxing. Ted Kara also performed well, reaching the quarterfinals in featherweight boxing.
- Laurie, at 18 was the youngest member of the U.S. boxing team at Berlin.
