= Asbjørn Berg-Hansen =

Norwegian boxer

Asbjørn Berg-Hansen (September 14, 1912 – January 28, 1998) was a Norwegian boxer who competed in the 1936 Summer Olympics. He was born and worked in Oslo as an electrician.

== Amateur career ==
Norway's most successful flyweight boxer, winning eight national championships between 1936 and 1950 (no championships were held during the war) - seven in the flyweight class, and one in bantamweight.

He was a member of the first official boxing contest between England and Norway on December 8, 1935, in the Oslo Colosseum; his opponent was Alfred Russell, which he would meet again a year later in the Olympics.

== Olympic results ==
In 1936 he competed in the flyweight class and lost in the round of 16.

- Defeated Alfred Russell (UK) points
- Lost to Louis Laurie (USA) points

== Honors ==
Norwegian Boxing Federation's gold watch, NBF's merit medal, NBF's honour badge, The King's Trophy for flyweight boxing and The King's Trophy for bantam boxing.
