= Herbert Runge =

German boxer

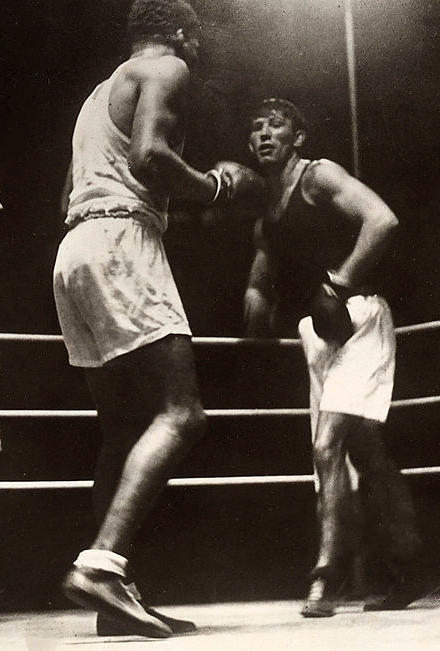
- Runge (right) vs. Guillermo Lovell at the 1936 Olympics

Personal information
- Nationality: Germany
- Born: 23 January 1913 Elberfeld, Rhine Province, German Empire
- Died: 11 March 1986 (aged 73) Wuppertal, North Rhine-Westphalia, West Germany
- Weight: Heavyweight

Boxing career
- Stance: Orthodox

Boxing record
- Total fights: 25
- Wins: 5
- Win by KO: 1
- Losses: 13 or 14
- Draws: 6
- No contests: 0 or 1
Medal record
Men's Boxing
Representing Germany
Olympic Games
Gold medal – first place	1936 Berlin	Heavyweight
European Amateur Championships
Silver medal – second place	1934 Budapest	Heavyweight
Silver medal – second place	1937 Milan	Heavyweight
Bronze medal – third place	1939 Dublin	Heavyweight

Herbert Runge (23 January 1913 – 11 March 1986) was a German heavyweight boxer. He won the gold medal at the 1936 Summer Olympics in Berlin.

He was born in Elberfeld, which later became part of Wuppertal, where he died as well.

== Amateur career ==
Runge's biggest success was his gold medal at the 1936 Summer Olympics in Berlin. He also won three medals at the European Amateur Boxing Championships (silver in 1934 and 1937 and bronze in 1939). In addition to that, he is an eight-time German amateur champion (1935–1939, 1941–1943), as well as two-time runner-up to Hein ten Hoff in 1940 and 1944.

=== 1936 Summer Olympics ===
- 1st round: bye
- 2nd round: Rudolf Kus (Czechoslovakia), knock-out in Round 1
- Quarter-final: Anthony Stuart (Great Britain), won on points
- Semi-final: Ferenc Nagy (Hungary), walkover, due to injury
- Gold medal bout: Guillermo Lovell (Argentina), won on points

== Professional career ==
Runge had an unsuccessful professional career that spanned from 1946 to 1949. Of 25 bouts, he won 5 (1 KO), drew 6 and lost 13 with one ending in a no contest (or 14 losses and no NC, sources are unclear).

== Commemoration ==
Still standing today is Runge's Olympic oak tree, that was given to every German 1936 Olympic champion to plant themselves as part of Nazi propaganda and Olympic legacy. It stands just outside the away section of Wuppertal's Stadion am Zoo football stadium, home to former Bundesliga club Wuppertaler SV.

A commemorative plaque with the inscription,

"Olympia-Eiche [Olympia-oak]

Herbert Runge
*23.01.1913 + 11.03.1986
Wuppertal

Olympiasieger Berlin 1936 [Olympic champion Berlin 1936]
Boxen Schwergewicht [Boxing Heavyweight]",

has been attached to the stadium fence in front of the tree in 1999.
