= Raúl Rodríguez (boxer) =

Argentine boxer

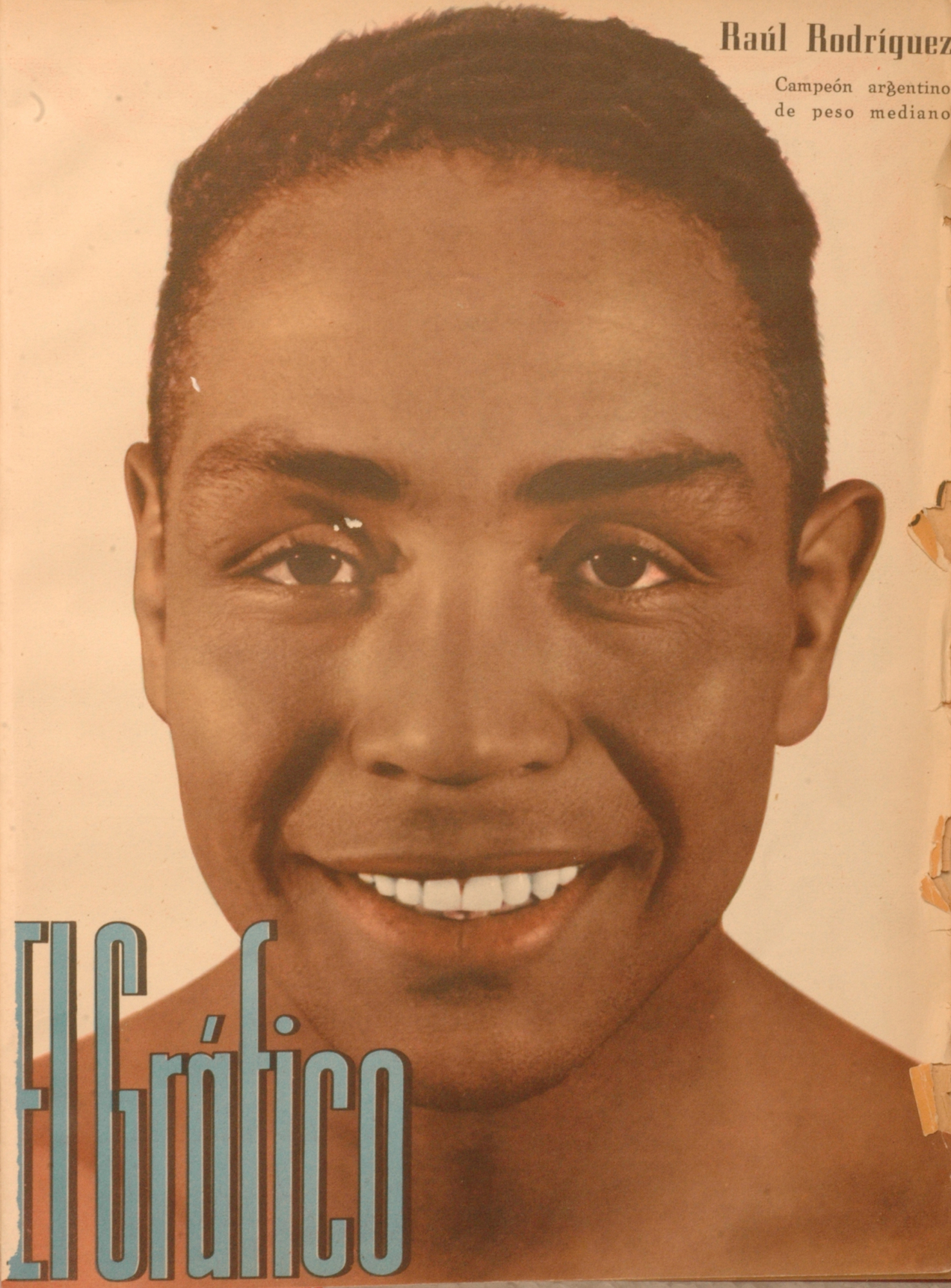

Raúl H. Rodríguez (26 November 1915 – 1977) was an Argentine boxer who competed in the 1936 Summer Olympics. He was born in Córdoba. In 1936, Rodríguez was eliminated in the quarterfinals of the welterweight class after losing his fight to the upcoming bronze medalist Gerhard Pedersen.
