= Ernest Toussaint =

Luxembourgish boxer (1908–1942)

Personal information
- Born: 6 March 1908 (age 118) Rumelange, Luxembourg
- Died: 3 September 1942 (aged 34) Hinzert concentration camp, Nazi Germany

Sport
- Sport: Boxing

Ernest Toussaint (6 March 1908 – 3 September 1942) was a Luxembourgish boxer who competed in the 1936 Summer Olympics.

== Life ==
Toussaint was born in Rumelange. He represented Luxembourg at the 1936 Olympics in Berlin. He defeated Karl Lutz of Austria in the second round before being eliminated in the quarterfinals of the heavyweight class by eventual bronze medalist Erling Nilsen of Norway.

Toussaint was shot in the Hinzert concentration camp, Nazi Germany after being arrested as one of the communist leaders in Differdange during the general strike against the Nazi occupation in Luxembourg on 31 August 1942. The country had been protesting against the introduction of compulsory military service for young Luxembourgers into the Wehrmacht. Toussaint's widow and his two sons were deported to the work camp of Leubus in Silesia.

In 1960 Toussaint was posthumously awarded the Cross of the Order of the Resistance.
