= Richard Shrimpton =

British boxer

Richard Thomas Shrimpton (29 January 1910 – 5 December 1979) was a British boxer who competed in the 1936 Summer Olympics. In 1936 he was eliminated in the second round of the middleweight class after losing his fight to the upcoming silver medalist Henry Tiller.
