= Hakon Aasnæs =

Norwegian sport shooter (1894–1973)

Personal information
- Born: 2 November 1894 Sande, Vestfold, Norway
- Died: 28 September 1973 (aged 78) Oslo, Norway

Sport
- Sport: Sports shooting

Hakon Aasnæs (2 November 1894 – 28 September 1973) was a Norwegian sport shooter. He was born in the municipality of Sande in Vestfold, and was a cousin of fellow Olympic sport shooter Hans Aasnæs. He represented the club Oslo Østre Skytterlag. He competed at the 1936 Summer Olympics, where he placed 23rd in small-bore rifle, 50 metre.
