= Edward Peltz =

South African boxer

Edward William Max Peltz (16 December 1916 – 1969) was a South African boxer who competed in the 1936 Summer Olympics.

In 1936 he was eliminated in the first round of the middleweight class after losing his fight to the upcoming silver medalist Henry Tiller.
