= Alfredo Carlomagno =

Argentine boxer (born 1917)

Alfredo Cipriano Carlomagno
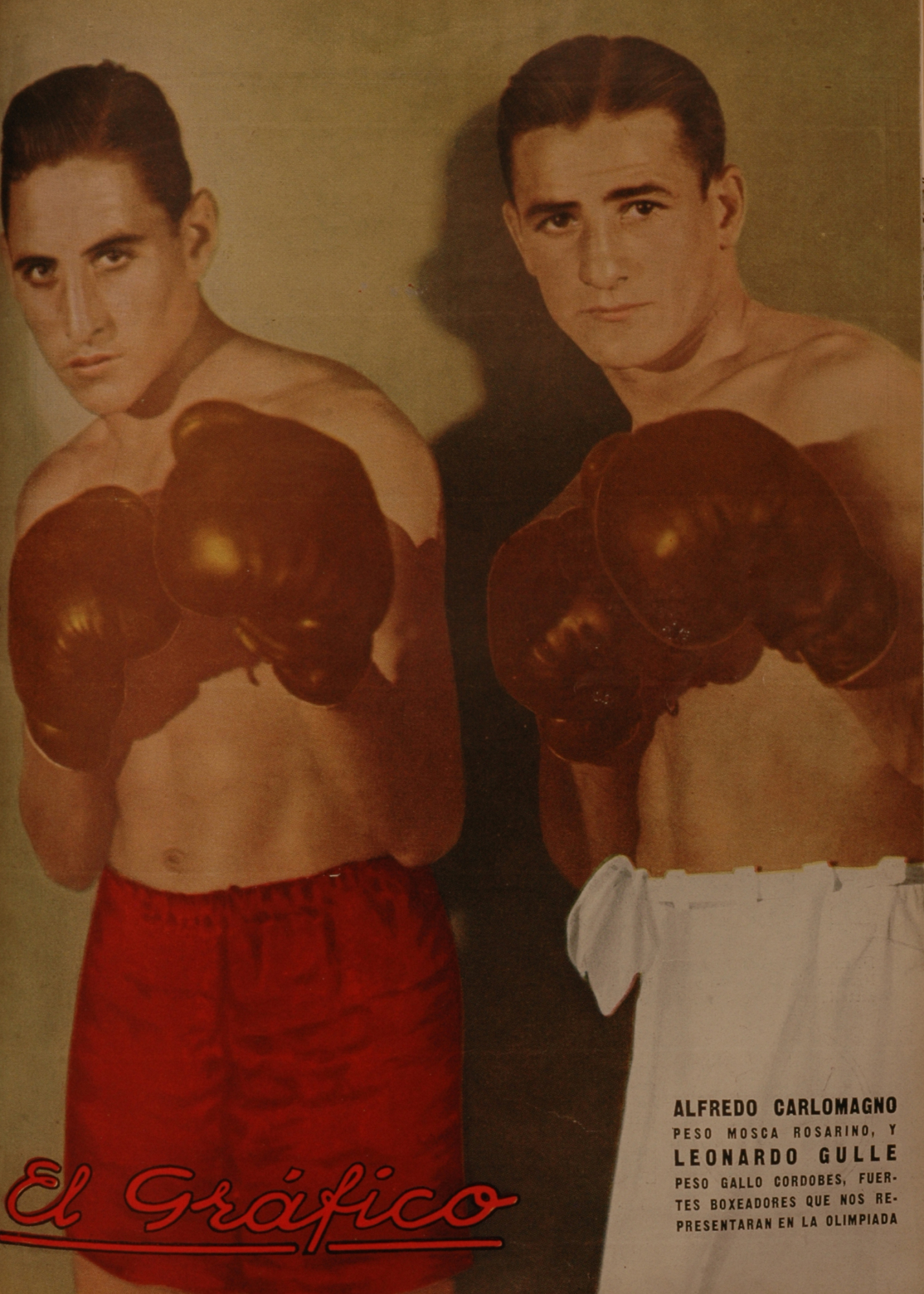
- Alfredo Carlomagno and Leonardo Gulle in 1936.

Personal information
- Nationality: Argentina
- Born: Alfredo Cipriano Carlomagno Zuffo; 12 October 1917 Rosario, Argentina
- Died: Rosario, Argentina

Boxing career

Alfredo Cipriano Carlomagno (born 5 October 1917, date of death unknown) was an Argentine boxer who competed in the 1936 Summer Olympics in Berlin. In 1936 he finished fourth in the flyweight class. He lost in his semifinal to Willy Kaiser and was not able to compete in the bronze-medal bout with Louis Laurie. Carlomagno is deceased.

== 1936 Olympic results ==
- Round of 32: bye
- Round of 16: defeated Chiyoto Nakano (Japan) on points
- Quarterfinal: defeated William Passmore (South Africa) on points
- Semifinal: lost to Willy Kaiser (Germany) on points
- Bronze-medal bout: lost to Louis Laurie (United States) by walkover
