= Roger Tritz =

French boxer

Roger Tritz (21 August 1914 – 1940) was a French boxer who competed in the 1936 Summer Olympics. In 1936 he finished fourth in the welterweight class. He lost in the semi-finals to the upcoming silver medalist Michael Murach and was not able to compete in the bronze medal both with Gerhard Pedersen.
