= Olle Tandberg =

Swedish boxer

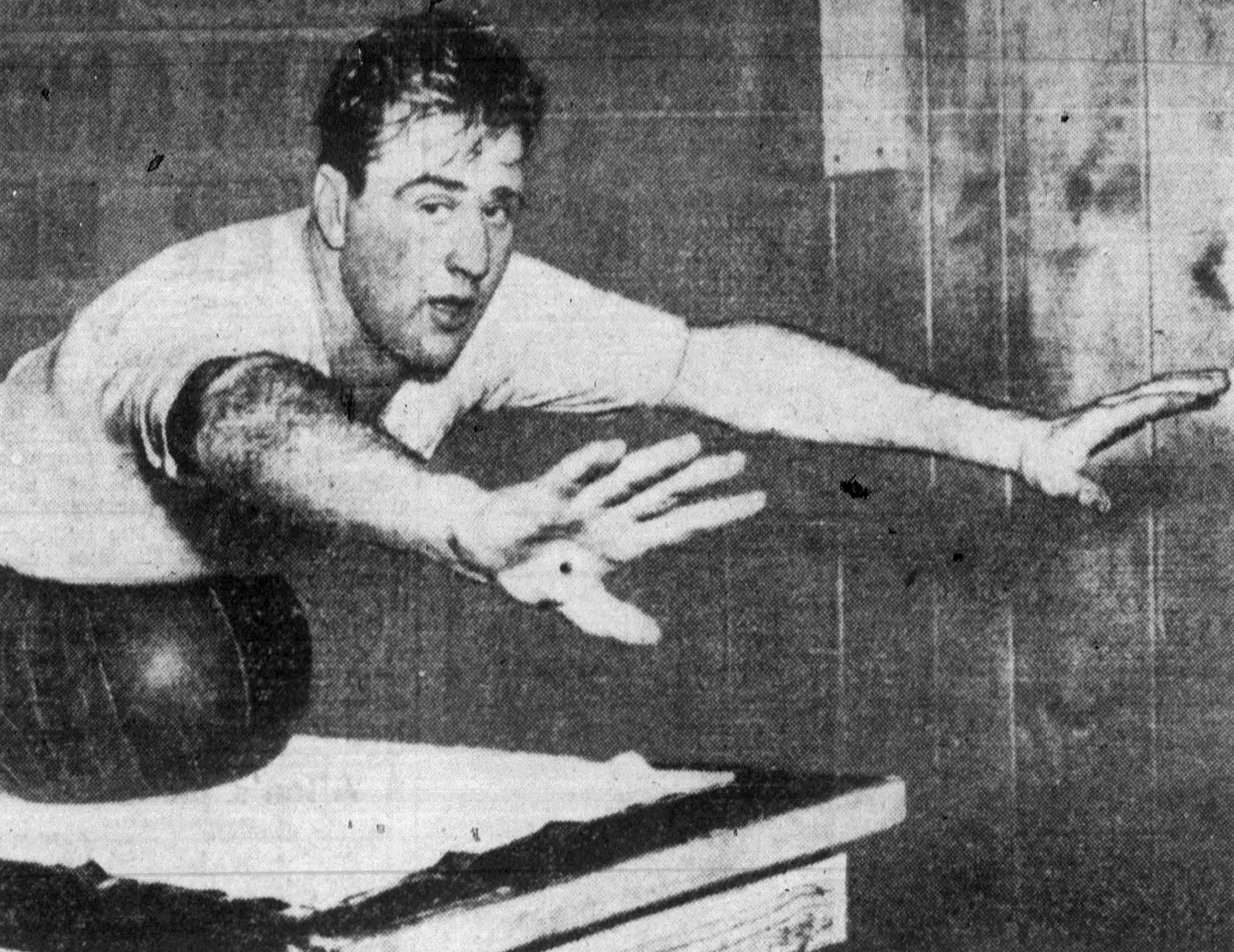
- Tandberg, circa 1947

Personal information
- Full name: Olof Peder Tandberg
- Nickname: "Olle"
- Nationality: Sweden
- Born: 10 October 1918 Stockholm, Stockholm Municipality
- Died: 26 December 1996 (aged 78) Nacka, Nacka Municipality
- Height: 1.90 m (6 ft 3 in)
- Weight: 79 kg (174 lb)

Sport
- Sport: Boxing
- Weight class: Heavyweight
- Club: Djurgårdens IF, Stockholm

Olof Peder "Olle" Tandberg (10 October 1918 – 26 December 1996) was a Swedish heavyweight boxer. He was the European amateur boxing champion between 1937 and 1939.

== Biography ==
Tandberg was born in Stockholm, Sweden on 10 October 1918. He represented Djurgårdens IF. During his career he had 30 fights, winning 23 (11 by KO), losing 6 (1 by KO), and drawing 1. He fought in the 1936 Berlin Olympics where he defeated US boxer Art Oliver. He lost in the second round of competition to Hungarian Ferenc Nagy. On 14 August 1949 he lost to Jersey Joe Walcott on TKO in the 5th round. He died in Stockholm on 26 December 1996.
