= Henry Tiller =

Norwegian boxer

Medal record

Men's Boxing
Silver medal – second place	1936 Berlin	middleweight

Henry Tiller (14 June 1914 – 4 May 1999) was a Norwegian boxer who competed in the 1936 Summer Olympics.

== Amateur career ==
Tiller's career started in 1931, when he became Norwegian amateur junior lightweight champion at the age of 17. He rapidly grew to middleweight, where he became Norwegian champion in 1935, 36, 37, 38 & 40, before the second world war put a halt to further championships.

He fought in ten international championships, and won eight.

In 1936 he won the silver medal in the middleweight class after losing the final against Jean Despeaux. He defeated Edward Peltz (RSA), Richard Shrimpton (GBR), the two favourites Adolf Baumgarten (GER), and Henryk Chmielewski (POL). Later that same year Tiller met Despaux in two international championships in Trondheim and Oslo - both times defeating him.

Tiller fought 158 amateur bouts. Of these he lost 22 & tied on 1.

== Pro career ==
In 1938 Tiller became the only Norwegian boxer to become an Amateur Boxing Association English middleweight champion, winning a clear victory over the English champion at the time, David Peck.

== Life after boxing ==
Tiller wrote an autobiography called 'Ringen Klar', published by Aschehoug in 1941.
