= Raoul Degryse =

Belgian boxer

Raoul Degryse (6 September 1912 – 19 June 1993) was a Belgian boxer who competed in the 1936 Summer Olympics. He was born in Oudenaarde. In 1936 he was eliminated in the quarter-finals of the flyweight class after losing his fight to the upcoming silver medalist Gavino Matta.
