= Anthony Stuart (boxer) =

English boxer

Personal information
- Nationality: British (English)
- Born: 28 December 1908 Brent, London, England
- Died: First quarter 1974 (aged 65) Brent, London, England

Sport
- Sport: boxing
Medal record
Men's Boxing
Representing England
British Empire Games
Gold medal – first place	1930 Hamilton	Heavyweight

Vincent Anthony Stuart (28 December 1908 – 1974) was an English boxer who competed for Great Britain in the 1936 Summer Olympics.

== Biography ==
He was born in London, England on 28 December 1908.

At the 1930 Empire Games he won the gold medal in the heavyweight class after winning the final against William Skimming of Canada.

In 1936 he was eliminated in the quarterfinals of the heavyweight class at the 1936 Summer Olympics after losing his fight to the eventual gold medallist Herbert Runge of Germany.

Stuart was the Amateur Boxing Association four times heavyweight champion, when boxing out of the London Fire Brigade ABC.
