= Ferenc Nagy (boxer) =

Hungarian boxer (1916–1977)

Personal information
- Full name: Nagy Ferenc
- Nationality: Hungary
- Born: 27 October 1916 Cegléd, Pest
- Died: 11 May 1977 (aged 60) Budapest

Sport
- Sport: Boxing
- Weight class: Heavyweight
- Club: B. Vasutas

Ferenc Nagy (27 October 1916 – 11 May 1977) was a Hungarian boxer who competed in the 1936 Summer Olympics.

He was born in Cegléd.

In 1936 he finished fourth in the heavyweight class. After his win in the quarterfinals against Olle Tandberg he was neither able to fight in the semifinal bout to Herbert Runge nor in the bronze medal bout to Erling Nilsen. He wasn't able to fight for the medal because he was locked in to the locker room and his trainer was ordered to throw in the towel. There was a clear political reason behind this and sadly the medal placement was already decided. See reference Cegled Sport torteneti Muzem**.
