= Edmund Sobkowiak =

Polish boxer

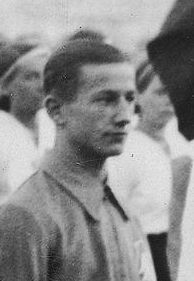
- Sobkowiak in 1935

Personal information
- Born: 25 January 1914 Poznań, Poland
- Died: 11 May 1988 (aged 74) Warsaw, Poland

Boxing career
Medal record
Men's amateur boxing
Representing Poland
European Amateur Championships
Silver medal – second place	1937 Milan	Flyweight

Edmund Sobkowiak (25 January 1914 – 11 May 1988) was a Polish boxer who competed in the 1936 Summer Olympics.

He was born in Poznań.

In 1936 he was eliminated in the quarterfinals of the flyweight class after losing his fight to eventual bronze medalist Louis Laurie.
