= Michael Murach =

German boxer (1911–1941)

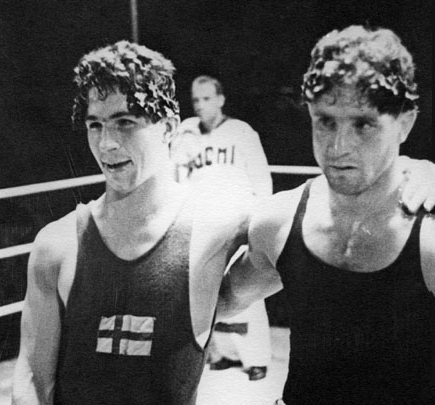
- Suvio and Murach (right) at the 1936 Olympics

Personal information
- Born: 1 February 1911 Schalke, Gelsenkirchen, German Empire
- Died: 16 August 1941 (aged 30) Dubrovka, Soviet Union
- Height: 171 cm (5 ft 7 in)
- Weight: 66 kg (146 lb)

Sport
- Sport: Boxing
- Club: FC Schalke 04
Medal record
Representing Germany
Olympic Games
Silver medal – second place	1936 Berlin	Welterweight
European Amateur Championships
Gold medal – first place	1937 Milan	Welterweight

Michael Murach (1 February 1911 – 16 August 1941) was a German amateur welterweight boxer. He won a silver medal at the 1936 Olympics, losing in the final to Sten Suvio. Murach won a European title in 1937 and five national titles in 1935 and 1937–1940. He was killed in action during World War II.

== 1936 Olympic results ==
Below is the record of Michael Murach, a German welterweight boxer who competed at the 1936 Berlin Olympics:

- Round of 32: bye
- Round of 16: defeated Walter Pack (Great Britain) on points
- Quarterfinal: defeated Hens Dekkers (Netherlands) on points
- Semifinal: defeated Roger Tritz (France) on points
- Final: lost to Sten Suvio (Finland) on points (was awarded silver medal)
