= Adolf Baumgarten =

German boxer

Adolf "Adi" Baumgarten (Hamburg, 3 May 1915 – Nevel, Soviet Union, 2 October 1942) was a German boxer who competed in the 1936 Summer Olympics.

In 1936 he was eliminated in the quarter-finals of the middleweight class after losing his fight to the upcoming silver medalist Henry Tiller. Furthermore, he won a silver medal himself at the 1942 European Amateur Boxing Championships in January of that year.

He was killed in action during World War II.
