= Henryk Chmielewski (boxer) =

Polish boxer

Henryk Chmielewsk
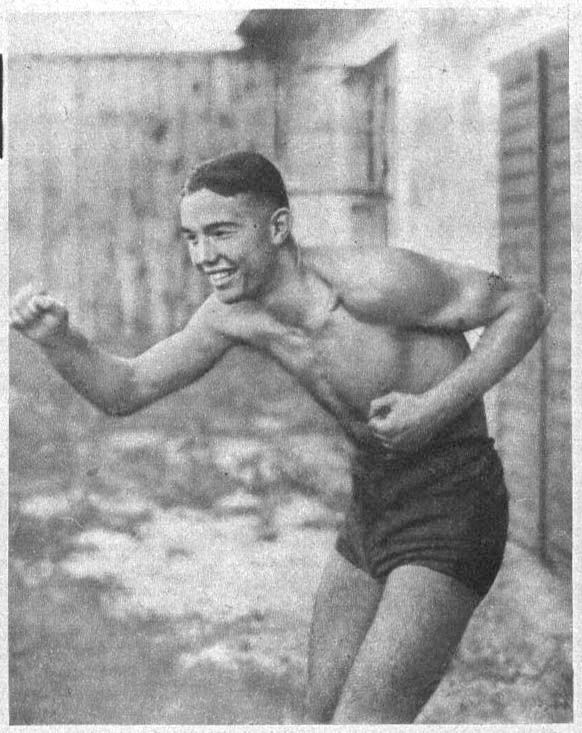

Personal information
- Born: 8 January 1914 Łódź, Congress Poland, Russian Empire
- Died: 1998 (aged 84) Hollywood, United States

Boxing career

Boxing record
- Total fights: 82
- Wins: 55
- Win by KO: 24
- Losses: 23
- Draws: 1
Medal record
Men's amateur boxing
Representing Poland
European Amateur Championships
| Gold medal – first place | 1937 Milan | Middleweight |

Henryk Chmielewski (8 January 1914 – 15 November 1998) was a Polish boxer who competed in the 1936 Summer Olympics. He was born in Łódź, Poland.

In 1936 he finished fourth in the middleweight class. After his loss in the semifinal bout against Henry Tiller he was not able to fight in the bronze medal bout against Raúl Villarreal.

He won gold medal in the European Amateur Boxing Championships, at Milan 1937.

In 1938, he emigrated to the United States, where he became a professional boxer (Henry Chemel). He died in Hollywood, Florida.

He was the winner of the Aleksander Reksza Boxing Award 1987.
