= Guillermo Lovell =

Argentine boxer

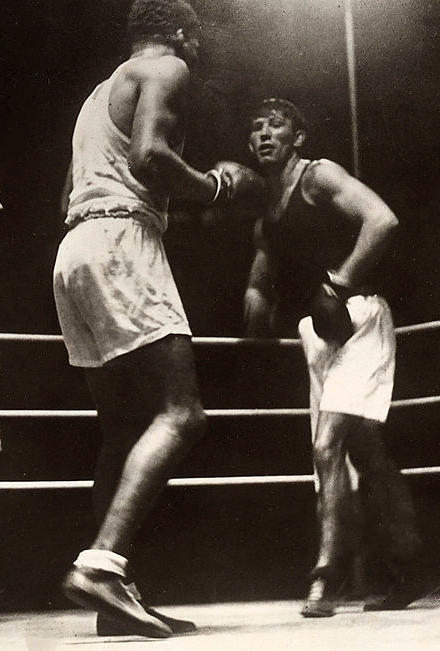
- Lovell (left) vs. Herbert Runge at the 1936 Olympics

Personal information
- Full name: Guillermo José Lovell
- Born: January 14, 1918 Dock Sud, Buenos Aires, Argentina
- Died: October 25, 1967 (aged 49)

Sport
- Sport: Boxing
- Weight class: Heavyweight
Medal record
Olympic Games
Silver medal – second place	1936 Berlin	Heavyweight

Guillermo José Lovell (January 14, 1918 – October 25, 1967) was an Argentine heavyweight boxer. He competed at the 1936 Berlin Olympics and won a silver medal, losing by points to Herbert Runge in the final. His elder brother Alberto Lovell and nephew Pedro were also Olympic boxers.

== 1936 Olympic results ==
Below are Guillermo Lovell's bouts from the 1936 Olympic boxing tournament in Berlin. Lovell competed in the heavyweight division for Argentina.

- Round of 16: defeated Omar Hermansen (Denmark) on points
- Quarterfinal: defeated Jose Feans (Uruguay) by a second-round knockout
- Semifinal: Defeated Erling Nilson (Norway) on points
- Final: lost to Herbert Runge (Germany) on points (was awarded a silver medal)
