= Gerhard Pedersen =

Danish boxer (1912–1987)

Olympic medal record

Men's Boxing
| Bronze medal – third place | 1936 Berlin | welterweight |

Gerhard Sigvald Pedersen (April 9, 1912 in Copenhagen, Denmark – June 4, 1987) was a Danish boxer who competed in the 1936 Summer Olympics. He represented the clubs Esbjerg AK 1917 and Esbjerg BBK.

In 1936 he won the bronze medal in the welterweight class after winning the third-place fight against Roger Tritz of France.

== 1936 Olympic results ==
Below are the results of Gerhard Pedersen, a Danish boxer who competed in the welterweight division at the 1936 Berlin Olympics:

- Round of 32: defeated Enrique Giaverni (Chile) on points
- Round of 16: defeated Rudolf Andreassen (Norway) on points
- Quarterfinal: defeated Raul Rodriguez (Argentina) on points
- Semifinal: lost to Sten Suvio (Finland) on points
- Bronze Medal Bout: defeated Roger Tritz (France) on points (won bronze medal)
