= Gavino Matta =

Italian boxer (1910–1954)

Olympic medal record

Men's Boxing
Silver medal – second place	1936 Berlin	flyweight

Gavino Matta (June 9, 1910 in Sassari – January 20, 1954) was an Italian boxer who competed in the 1936 Summer Olympics.

In 1936, Matta won the silver medal in the flyweight class after losing the final fight to Willy Kaiser, the German competitor. The American, Lou Laurie, won the bronze. In the final fight for the title, Kaiser attacked Matta from the outset, forcing the tempo at close quarters and keeping Matta at bay. When Matta tried to fight back Kaiser pushed the pace. Towards the end of the fight the Italian tired and Kaiser wrapped up a points decision and Germany's first ever boxing gold. The two men met again a year later in the European championship and Matta succeeded to defeat Kaiser, although this time it was for the bronze medal. Matta and Lauria later turned professional with Matta going on to become the Italian champion. In 1937 Europe's boxing champions, including Matta, competed against the Golden Gloves in international fights.

== Olympic Record ==
Gavino Matta competed for Italy in the 1936 Berlin Olympics as a flyweight boxer. Here is Matta's complete Olympic record:

- Round of 32: defeated Tinus Lambiliion (Netherlands) on points
- Round of 16: defeated Kaj Frederikson (Denmark) on points
- Quarterfinal: defeated Raoul Degryse (Belgium) on points
- Semifinal: defeated Louis Laurie (USA) on points
- Final: lost to Willy Kaiser (Germany) on points (awarded silver medal)
