= Sten Suvio =

Finnish boxer

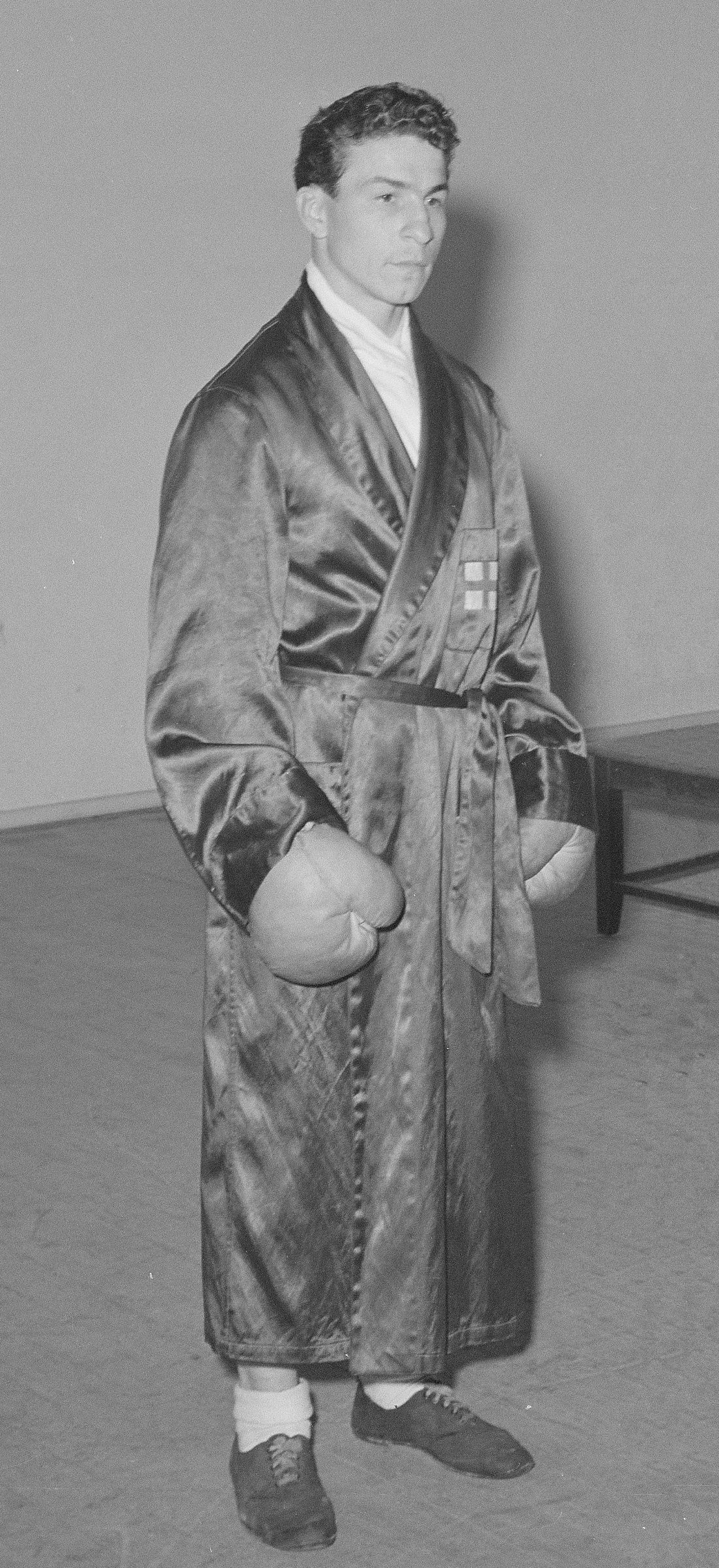
- Suvio in 1943

Personal information
- Born: 25 November 1911 Hannila, Viipuri Province, Imperial Russia
- Died: 19 October 1988 (aged 76) Helsinki, Finland
- Height: 170 cm (5 ft 7 in)
- Weight: 65–68 kg (143–150 lb)

Sport
- Sport: Boxing
Medal record
Representing Finland
Olympic Games
Gold medal – first place	1936 Berlin	Welterweight

Sten "Stepa" Suvio (born Schuschin, 25 November 1911 – 19 October 1988) was a Finnish boxer who won the welterweight contest at the 1936 Summer Olympics. He then turned professional and by 1949 accumulated a record of 34 wins (15 knockouts), 9 losses and 3 draws.

Suvio started as a football player, wrestler and speed skater before changing to boxing in 1927. He placed second at the national championships in 1929 and 1930, and then won four consecutive amateur titles in 1933–1936. Suvio fought in the Continuation War and was wounded in a hand in 1941. After recovering he captured the Finnish professional welterweight title in 1946. He retired in 1949 and then coached the Swedish (1949–1957) and Turkish (1957–1960) national boxing teams. He was inducted into the Finnish Boxing Hall of Fame in 2005.

== 1936 Olympic results ==
Below is the record of Sten Suvio, a Finnish welterweight boxer who competed at the 1936 Berlin Olympics:

- Round of 32: defeated Keikan Ri (Japan) on points
- Round of 16: defeated Leonard Cook (Australia) on points
- Quarterfinal: defeated Imre Mandi (Hungary) on points
- Semifinal: defeated Gerhard Pedersen (Denmark) on points
- Final: defeated Michael Murach (Germany) on points (won gold medal)
