= Jean Despeaux =

French boxer (1915–1989)

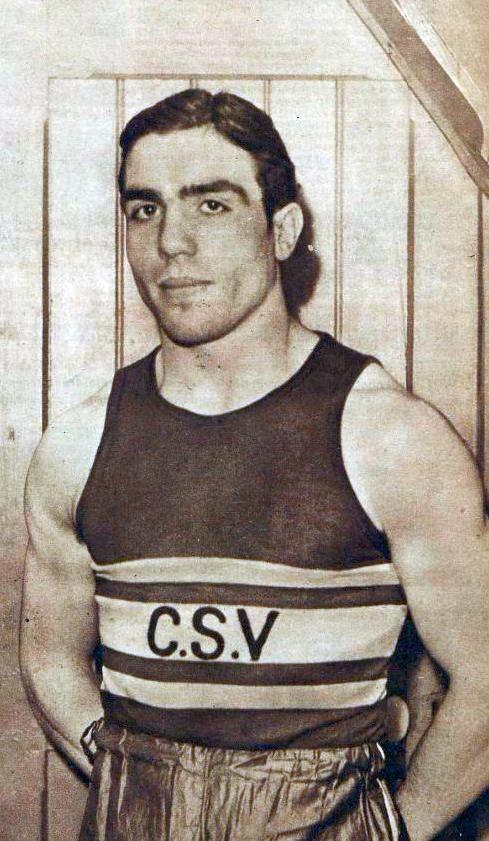

Medal record

Men's boxing

Representing France

Olympic Games
Gold medal – first place	1936 Berlin	Middleweight

Jean Despeaux (22 October 1915 – 25 May 1989) was a French boxer who competed in the 1936 Summer Olympics.

In 1936 he won the gold medal in the middleweight class after winning the final against Henry Tiller.

He also acted in a handful of films, including Maurice Tourneur's La Main du diable (1943), in which he played a boxer.

== 1936 Olympic results ==
Below is the Olympic record of Jean Despeaux of France, who competed as a middleweight boxer at the 1936 Berlin Olympics.

- Round of 16: defeated Juan Bregaliano (Uruguay) on points
- Quarterfinal: defeated Josef Hrubes (Czechoslovakia) on points
- Semifinal: defeated Raul Villarreal (Argentina) on points
- Final: defeated Henry Tiller (Norway) on points (won gold medal)
