= List of Val Barker Trophy winners =

Award

Val Barker Trophy
- Awarded for: demonstration of excellence in Olympic boxing
- Presented by: AIBA
- First award: 1936
- Currently held by: Claressa Shields; Hasanboy Dusmatov

The Val Barker Trophy is presented every four years to the most "outstanding boxer" at the Olympic Games. In theory, the award goes to the top "pound for pound" boxer in the Olympics. The winner is selected by a committee of International Boxing Association (amateur) (AIBA) officials. The trophy is named after British boxer Val Barker who won the Amateur Boxing Association of England (ABA) heavyweight title in 1891, before becoming the secretary of the AIBA between 1926 and 1929.

The inaugural recipient of the Val Barker Trophy was American flyweight Louis Laurie who won bronze at the 1936 Summer Olympics in Berlin. He is one of just three boxers who did not win gold at the same Olympics in which they were presented with the trophy, the others being Kenyan featherweight Philip Waruinge (bronze at the 1968 Games) and American light middleweight Roy Jones Jr. (silver at the 1988 Games). In the 2016 Games, two Val Barker Trophies were presented for the first time, one for men and one for women; women's boxing made its Olympic debut at the previous Games in 2012. The inaugural female winner was middleweight Claressa Shields who became the first American boxer to win two consecutive Olympic gold medals when she defeated Dutch boxer Nouchka Fontijn in Rio de Janeiro.

American boxers lead with six trophies, followed by Kazakhstani boxers with three awards and Russian boxers with two awards (one for the Soviet Union and one for Russia).

== Recipients ==
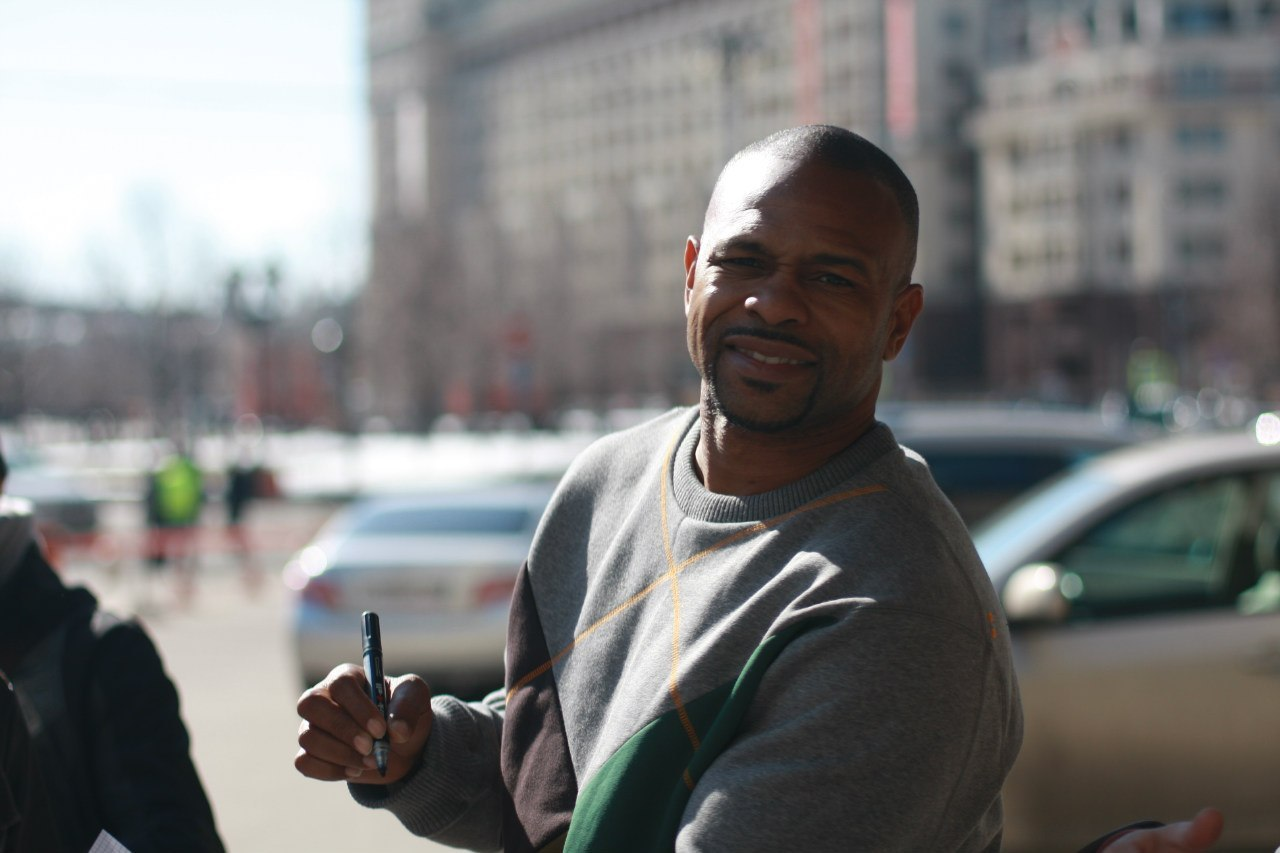
Roy Jones Jr. was controversially denied a gold in 1988, but was recognized as the most stylistic boxer of the games

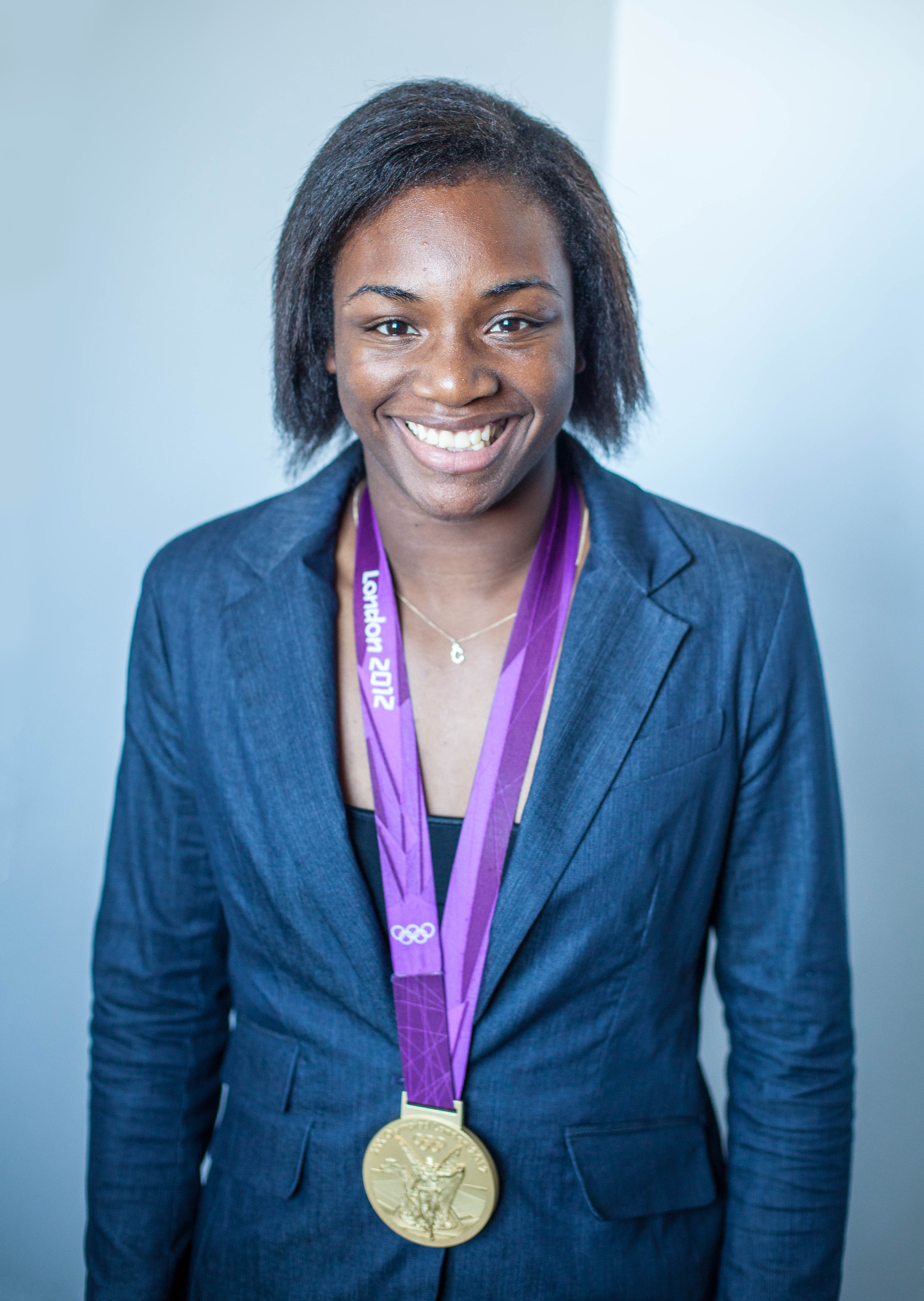
Claressa Shields became the first recipient of the female variant of the trophy, after winning the gold medal at the Rio de Janeiro games in 2016

Games	Location	Boxer	Nationality	Weight class	Medal	Ref(s)
1936	Berlin	Louis Laurie	United States	Flyweight	Bronze	
1948	London	George Hunter	South Africa	Light heavyweight	Gold	
1952	Helsinki	Norvel Lee	United States	Light heavyweight	Gold	
1956	Melbourne	Dick McTaggart	Great Britain	Lightweight	Gold	
1960	Rome	Nino Benvenuti	Italy	Welterweight	Gold	
1964	Tokyo	Valeri Popenchenko	Soviet Union	Middleweight	Gold	
1968	Mexico City	Philip Waruinge	Kenya	Featherweight	Bronze	
1972	Munich	Teófilo Stevenson	Cuba	Heavyweight	Gold	
1976	Montreal	Howard Davis Jr.	United States	Lightweight	Gold	
1980	Moscow	Patrizio Oliva	Italy	Light welterweight	Gold	
1984	Los Angeles	Paul Gonzales	United States	Light flyweight	Gold	
1988	Seoul	Roy Jones Jr.	United States	Light middleweight	Silver	
1992	Barcelona	Roberto Balado	Cuba	Super heavyweight	Gold	
1996	Atlanta	Vassiliy Jirov	Kazakhstan	Light heavyweight	Gold	
2000	Sydney	Oleg Saitov	Russia	Welterweight	Gold	
2004	Athens	Bakhtiyar Artayev	Kazakhstan	Welterweight	Gold	
2008	Beijing	Vasyl Lomachenko	Ukraine	Featherweight	Gold	
2012	London	Serik Sapiyev	Kazakhstan	Welterweight	Gold	
2016	Rio de Janeiro	Hasanboy Dusmatov	Uzbekistan	Men's light flyweight	Gold	
2016	Rio de Janeiro	Claressa Shields	United States	Women's middleweight	Gold	
2020	Tokyo	Not awarded due to the suspension of AIBA				
2024	Paris	Not awarded due to the suspension of AIBA				
