= Polytechnic Boxing Club =

Boxing club in London

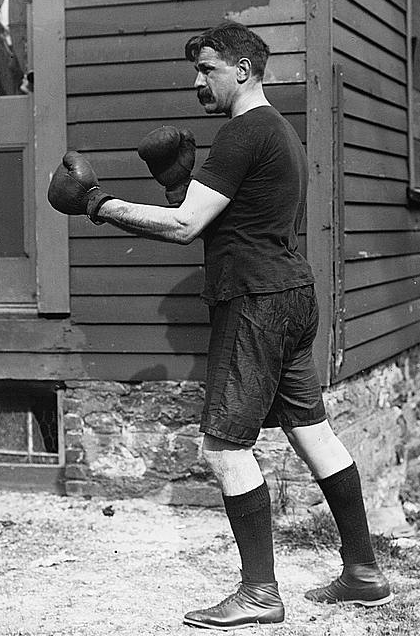
Frank Parks (1875–1945) joined in 1892

The Polytechnic Boxing Club for amateur boxing was formed in 1888 and is located at 309 Regent Street in London. The name "Polytechnic" comes from the Royal Polytechnic Institute having been formerly at that address which would later become the home of the University of Westminster.

Starting in 1898 the boxing club awarded the Studd trophy, named after Sir John Edward Kynaston Studd. The club was a member of the Amateur Boxing Association of England.

The Polytechnic Magazine being the in-house magazine of the school would cover the boxing club along with many other clubs, social activities, and other news.

== Notable members ==
- Arthur Beavis (1905–1978), twice A.B.A featherweight champion
- Bert Brewer (1876–1946), 1899 A.B.A. lightweight champion & 1907 ABA Heavyweight Champion.
- John Elliott (1901–1945), 1924–1925 ABA Middleweight Champion.
- Pat Floyd (1910–1988), 1946 ABA Heavyweight Champion.
- Harry Holmes (1878–1951), Olympic boxer and two times A.B.A champion
- Harry Mitchell (1898–1983), four times A.B.A light heavyweight champion
- Patrick O'Hanrahan (1894–1963), 1924–1925 ABA Welterweight Champion & Olympian
- Wally Pack (1914–1974), 1936 ABA Welterweight Champion & Olympian.
- Frank Parks (1875–1945) joined in 1892. He was the 1899, 1901–1902, and 1905–1906 ABA Heavyweight Champion. (Note: BoxRec actually lists "Fred Parks" for 1899, 1901-1902, and 1905-1906. Sources tend to confuse and conflate the two brothers. There is a "Frederick Mostyn Parks" listed in Sports Reference as the Olympic medalist. There is "F. Parks" and "Frank Parks" listed in The New York Times for the exhibition matches in the US. The obituary by the Polytechnic Boxing Club is about "Frank Parks". Other sources use a pastiche of information on each in their records.)
- Ronald Rawson (1892–1952), 1920–1921 ABA Heavyweight Champion.
- Dave Thomas, 1957–1959 ABA Heavyweight Champion.
- William W. Allen, four times ABA bantamweight champion (2 with Polytechnic 1911–1912)
