= Boxing at the 1908 Summer Olympics – Middleweight =

Boxing competitions

Men's middleweight boxing at the Games of the IV Olympiad
- Date: October 27, 1908
- Competitors: 10 from 3 nations

Medalists
1st place, gold medalist(s)		Johnny Douglas	Great Britain
2nd place, silver medalist(s)		Reginald Baker	Australasia
3rd place, bronze medalist(s)		William Philo	Great Britain

The middleweight was one of five boxing weight classes contested on the boxing at the 1908 Summer Olympics programme. Like all other boxing events, it was open only to men. The boxing competitions were all held on October 27. The middleweight was the second-heaviest class, allowing boxers of up to 158 pounds (71.7 kg). It was the only boxing event in which a non-British boxer won a bout. Reginald Baker from Australia (competing on the Australasia team) won three before losing to Johnny Douglas in the final. Ten boxers from three nations competed. Each NOC could enter up to 12 boxers. Australasia entered 1 boxer; France entered 5 boxers, 2 of whom withdrew; and Great Britain entered 6 boxers.

== Competition format ==
There were three rounds in each bout, with the first two rounds being three minutes long and the last one going four minutes. Two judges scored the match, giving 5 points to the better boxer in each of the first two rounds and 7 to the better boxer in the third round. Marks were given to the other boxer in proportion to how well he did compared to the better. If the judges were not agreed on a winner at the end of the bout, the referee could either choose the winner or order a fourth round.

== Results ==
=== Bracket ===
Round of 16; October 27
William Childs (GBR)	KO2
Gaston Aspa (FRA)	L
William Dees (GBR)	L
Reginald Baker (ANZ)	KO2
William Philo (GBR)	2
Arthur Murdoch (GBR)	1
Ruben Warnes (GBR)	KO2
Charles Morard (FRA)	L
René Doudelle (FRA)	L
Johnny Douglas (GBR)	KO1

Quarterfinals; October 27
Childs (GBR)	0
Baker (ANZ)	2
Philo (GBR)	-
Bye	-
Warnes (GBR)	-
Bye	-
Douglas (GBR)	-
Bye	-

Semifinals; October 27
Baker (ANZ)	KO1
Philo (GBR)	L
Warnes (GBR)	L
Douglas (GBR)	KO2

Final; October 27
Baker (ANZ)	1
Douglas (GBR)	2

Did not start: S. de Néve and J. Oudin of France

=== Round of 16 ===
The first round was characterized by knockouts, as all three Frenchmen as well as Dees were out before the start of the third round. Aspa managed to make it through two rounds before withdrawing due to a thumb injury. Doudelle went down the quickest, in the first round, while Dees and Morard were bested in the second rounds of their bouts. The one bout that did go all the way was between Philo and Murdoch, which was such a tight contest that the referee had to break the judges' tie.

=== Quarterfinals ===
Philo, Warnes, and Douglas all had byes in the second round. Baker and Childs had the only quarterfinal match. The Australian hit Childs with a powerful uppercut as well as managing to avoid a charge by Childs that caused the Briton to fall through the ropes. In a clear decision, Baker advanced to the semifinals.

=== Semifinals ===
Both semifinal contests were knockouts, bringing the middleweight event to a total of 6 knockouts to 2 decisions. Baker defeated Philo quickly, while Douglas took two rounds to put Warnes away.

=== Final ===
In a match that had the potential to break England's dominance of the boxing championships, Baker and Douglas went through a middleweight final that the Official Report described as the "best boxing of the day" (and therefore the entire 1908 Olympic boxing competition). The two fought well, with Douglas's knockdown of Baker in the second a major factor in the Briton's win.

== Standings ==
Rank	Boxer	Nation
1st place, gold medalist(s)	Johnny Douglas	Great Britain
2nd place, silver medalist(s)	Reginald Baker	Australasia
3rd place, bronze medalist(s)	William Philo	Great Britain
4	Ruben Warnes	Great Britain
5	William Childs	Great Britain
6	Gaston Aspa	France
6	William Dees	Great Britain
6	René Doudelle	France
6	Charles Morard	France
6	Arthur Murdoch	Great Britain

== Sources ==
- Official Report of the Games of the IV Olympiad (1908).
- De Wael, Herman. Herman's Full Olympians: "Boxing 1908". Accessed 8 April 2006. Available electronically at.
