= Harry Dunn (boxer) =

British boxer

Personal information
- Nationality: British
- Born: 23 December 1906
- Died: 16 March 1978 (aged 71)

Sport
- Sport: Boxing

Harry T Dunn (23 December 1906 – 16 March 1978) was a British boxer. He competed in the men's welterweight event at the 1928 Summer Olympics.

Dunn won the 1927 Amateur Boxing Association British welterweight title, when boxing out of the Lynn ABC.
