= Danny Price (boxer) =

British boxer

Personal information
- Born: Daniel Anthony Price; 15 September 1985 (age 40) Scarborough, England
- Height: 6 ft 6 in (198 cm)
- Weight: Cruiserweight

Boxing career
- Stance: Orthodox

Boxing record
- Total fights: 9
- Wins: 9
- Win by KO: 3
Medal record
Men's amateur boxing
Representing England
World Junior Championships
Bronze medal – third place	2004 Jeju	Light heavyweight
Commonwealth Championships
Gold medal – first place	2007 Liverpool	Heavyweight
GB Championships
Silver medal – second place	2010 Liverpool	Heavyweight
English National Championships
Gold medal – first place	2007 London	Heavyweight
Gold medal – first place	2010 London	Heavyweight

Daniel Anthony "Danny" Price (born 15 September 1985) is an English former professional boxer, who competed from 2011 to 2013. He is a two-time ABA heavyweight champion as an amateur.

== Amateur career ==
Born in Scarborough, Price boxed for Westway ABC. He won Bronze at the 2004 World Junior Championships as a light heavyweight, after losing to Ismaikel Perez by RSCO in the semi-finals. He won gold as a heavyweight at the 2005 Multi-Nations Tournament, defeating David Dolan in the final 26:11.

At the 2006 Commonwealth Games in Melbourne, Australia, Price controversially lost 12:16 in the first bout to eventual winner Bradley Pitt. In December 2007, he won his first ABA heavyweight title after beating defending champion Tony Bellew 8:6. As of 2006, his record was 41 wins in 49 fights.

At the 2007 World Amateur Boxing Championships, Price was eliminated in the first round by the eventual winner Clemente Russo. He won gold at both the 2007 Tammer Tournament, beating Evgenyi Romanov, and the 2008 Tammer Tournament, beating Ihab Almatbouli. He also bested American Quantis Graves at the UK-US duals 21:1.

During qualification for the 2008 Summer Olympics, Price lost to Oleksandr Usyk in the 1st qualifier, before losing to Jozsef Darmos in the 2nd qualifier. He won his second ABA heavyweight title on 14 May 2010, beating Emmanuel Izonritei in the final.

== Professional career ==
Price turned professional in 2011, making his debut as a cuiserweight on 22 October, beating Michal Tomko via corner retirement in the first round. He had eight more fights, including wins over well-known journeymen Hastings Rasani and Moses Matovu. His last professional match was on 11 May 2013, beating Michal Bilak via knockout in the third round.

== Professional boxing record ==
9 Wins (3 Knockouts), 0 Defeats, 0 Draws
Res.	Record	Opponent	Type	Rd., Time	Date	Location	Notes
Win	9–0	(Czech Republic) Michal Bilak	KO	3 (6), 2:49	2013-05-11	(England) Spa, Scarborough	
Win	8–0	(Hungary) Tamas Bajzath	KO	1 (6), 1:45	2013-02-15	(England) Rainton Meadows Arena, Sunderland	
Win	7–0	(Latvia) Jevgenijs Andrejevs	PTS	6	2012-11-30	(England) Aintree Racecourse, Liverpool	
Win	6–0	(Wales) Hari Miles	PTS	6	2012-10-13	(England) Echo Arena, Liverpool	
Win	5–0	(Uganda) Moses Matovu	PTS	6	2012-06-02	(England) Bowlers Exhibition Centre, Manchester	
Win	4–0	(England) John Anthony	PTS	4	2012-03-03	(England) Hillsborough Leisure Centre, Sheffield	
Win	3–0	(Bulgaria) Tayar Mehmed	PTS	4	2012-01-21	(England) Liverpool Olympia, Liverpool	
Win	2–0	(Zimbabwe) Hastings Rasani	PTS	4	2011-12-11	(England) Peterlee Leisure Centre, Peterlee	
Win	1–0	(Slovakia) Michal Tomko	RTD	1 (6), 0:41	2011-10-22	(England) Reebok Stadium, Bolton	

Sporting positions
Amateur boxing titles
Preceded by Tony Bellew	ABA heavyweight champion 2007	Succeeded by Warren Baister
Preceded by Chris Keane	ABA heavyweight champion 2010	Succeeded by Ben Ileyemi
