= George Shorter =

British boxer

Personal information
- Nationality: British
- Born: 17 June 1894; London, England
- Died: 4th quarter 1968 (aged 74); London, England

Sport
- Sport: Boxing

George Richard Shorter (17 June 1894 – 1968) was a British boxer. He competed in the men's lightweight event at the 1924 Summer Olympics.

Shorter won the 1921 and 1923 Amateur Boxing Association British lightweight titles, when boxing out of the Clapton Federation ABC.
