= Albert Oldman =

English boxer

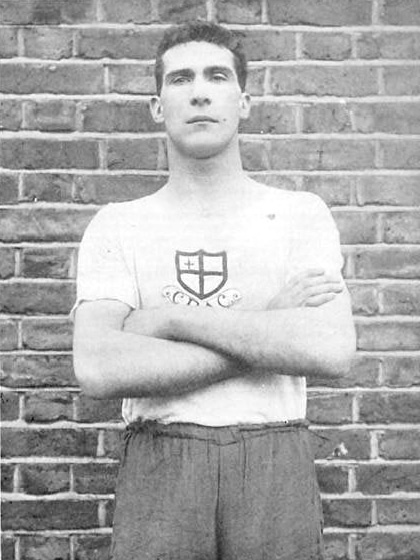
- Oldman at 1908 Olympics in London

Personal information
- Born: 18 November 1883 Mile End, London, England
- Died: 15 January 1961 (aged 77) Upminster, London, England
Medal record
Men's boxing
Representing Great Britain
Olympic Games
Gold medal – first place	1908 London	Heavyweight

Albert Leonard Oldman (18 November 1883 – 15 January 1961) was an English super heavyweight boxer in the 1908 Olympics in London for Great Britain.

== Biography ==
Oldman was born in Mile End, London in 1883. His passage to Olympic gold was one of the smoothest ever as he knocked out his first rival within a minute. He received a bye in the semi-final and defeated Sydney Evans, his fellow Briton, in less than two minutes in the final.

Oldman, who served in the Royal Horse Guards, later became a policeman in the City of London Police. He emigrated to join the Ceylon force in 1910.

He died on 15 January 1961, at the age of 77, in Upminster, London.
