= England Boxing National Amateur Championships Middleweight Champions =

English Boxing competition

England Boxing National Amateur Championships Middleweight Champions (U75kg)
- Status: active
- Genre: Boxing
- Inaugurated: 1881
- Organiser: England Boxing

The England Boxing National Amateur Championships Middleweight Championship formerly known as the ABA Championships is the primary English amateur boxing championship. It had previously been contested by all the nations of the United Kingdom.

== History ==
The middleweight division was inaugurated in 1881 and is currently contested in the under-75 Kg weight division. The championships are highly regarded in the boxing world and seen as the most prestigious national amateur championships.

== Past Winners ==
Year	Winner	Club
1881	Thomas Percy Bellhouse	Manchester ABC
1882	Arthur J Curnick	Clapton ABC
1883	Arthur J Curnick	West London ABC
1884	William Brown	Birmingham ABC
1885	John Manning Salmon	Waltham Abbey ABC
1886	Bill J King	Belsize ABC
1887	Robert Hair	North London ABC
1888	Robert Hair	St. James ABC
1889	George Sykes	St. James ABC
1890	Joe Hoare	Orion ABC
1891	Joe Steers	Middleton ABC
1892	Joe Steers	Middleton ABC
1893	Joe Steers	Middleton ABC
1894	Walter Sykes	Mincing Lane ABC
1895	Geoff Townsend	Goldsmith's Institute ABC
1896	W. G. Ross	Belsize ABC
1897	William J. Dees	Goldsmith's Institute ABC
1898	Geoff L. Townsend	Goldsmith's Institute ABC
1899	Rube Warnes	Columbia ABC
1900	Edward Mann	Lynn ABC
1901	Rube Warnes	Lynn ABC
1902	Edward Mann	Lynn ABC
1903	Rube Warnes	Lynn ABC
1904	Edward Mann	Lynn ABC
1905	Johnny Douglas	Belsize ABC
1906	Arthur Murdoch	Belsize ABC
1907	Rube Warnes	Gainsford ABC
1908	William Child	Cambridge ABC
1909	William Child	Cambridge ABC
1910	Rube Warnes	Surrey Commercial Docks ABC
1911	William Child	Cambridge ABC
1912	Ernest Chandler	Stock Exchange ABC
1913	Bill Bradley	Bermondsey Catholic ABC
1914	Hugh Brown	Belsize ABC
1915-1918	not held	
1919	Harry Mallin	Eton Old Boys ABC
1920	Harry Mallin	Eton Old Boys ABC
1921	Harry Mallin	Metropolitan Police ABC
1922	Harry Mallin	Eton Old Boys & Met Police ABC
1923	Harry Mallin	Eton Manor ABC
1924	John Elliott	Polytechnic ABC
1925	John Elliott	Polytechnic & PLA Police ABC
1926	Frank Crawley	Royal Tank Corps
1927	Sgt. Frank Crawley	Royal Tank Corps
1928	Fred Mallin	Eton Manor ABC
1929	Fred Mallin	Eton Manor ABC
1930	Fred Mallin	Eton Manor ABC
1931	Fred Mallin	Eton Manor ABC
1932	Fred Mallin	Eton Manor ABC
1933	Alf Shawyer	Old Goldsmiths ABC
1934	Jimmy Magill	Royal Ulster Constabulary
1935	Jimmy Magill	Royal Ulster Constabulary
1936	Albert Harrington	Victoria & Battersea ABC
1937	Maurice Dennis	Northampton Polytechnic ABC
1938	Henry Tiller	Norway
1939	Ossie Davies	Nottingham City Police ABC
1940-42	Not held	
1943	G. Page	Stones ABC
1944	Jim Hockley	Langham ABC
1945	Bob Parker	APTC & Dagenham ABC
1946	Randolph Turpin	Royal Navy
1947	Roy Agland	Tir-y-berth ABC
1948	OS Johnny Wright	Royal Navy
1949	Stan Lewis	Langham ABC
1950	Cpl. Peter Longo	Army
1951	L/Cpl. Eric Ludlam	Army
1952	L/Cpl. Terry Gooding	Army
1953	LAC Ron Barton	Royal Air Force
1954	Ken Phillips	Royal Air Force & Warley
1955	Frank Hope	St. Teresa's ABC
1956	Ronald Redrup	West Ham ABC
1957	Peter Burke	Sankeys ABC
1958	Peter Hill	Fitzroy Lodge ABC
1959	L/Cpl. Fred Elderfield	Army
1960	Roy Addison	Royal Air Force
1961	Tpr. Johnny Caiger	Army
1962	Alf Matthews	Litherland ABC
1963	Alf Matthews	Litherland ABC
1964	William Stack	Leamington Boys Club
1965	Bill Robinson	Stock Exchange ABC
1966	Chris Finnegan	Hayes ABC
1967	Allan Ball	Bargoed ABC
1968	Peter McCann	Birkenhead ABC
1969	Dave Wallington	Keystone Boys Club
1971	Alan Minter	Crawley ABC
1970	John Conteh	Kirkby ABC
1972	Frankie Lucas	Sir Philip Game ABC
1973	Frankie Lucas	Sir Philip Game ABC
1974	Dave Odwell	Repton ABC
1975	Dave Odwell	Repton ABC
1976	Eddie Burke	Woodside ABC
1977	Robbie Davies	Birkenhead ABC
1978	Herol Graham	Radford Boys ABC
1979	Nicky Wilshire	National Smelting ABC
1980	Mark Kaylor	West Ham ABC
1981	Brian Schumacher	Royal Navy
1982	Jimmy Price	Holy Name ABC
1983	Trevor Forbes	All Star ABC
1984	Brian Schumacher	Royal Navy
1985	Denys Cronin	Llandbradach BC
1986	Nigel Benn	West Ham ABC
1987	Rod Douglas	Broad Street ABC
1988	Mark Edwards	Royal Navy
1989	Seymour Johnson	Gloucester ABC
1990	Stephen Wilson	Haddington ABC
1991	Mark Edwards	Royal Navy
1992	Lee Woolcock	Canvey Island ABC
1993	Joe Calzaghe	Newbridge ABC
1994	David Starie	Hurstlea & Kerridge ABC
1995	Jason Matthews	Crown and Manor ABC
1996	John Pearce	Wellington ABC
1997	Ian Cooper	Hartlepool Boys ABC
1998	John Pearce	Wellington ABC
1999	Carl Froch	Phoenix ABC
2000	Stephen Swales	Phil Thomas SOB ABC
2001	Carl Froch	Phoenix ABC
2002	Neil Perkins	Kirkdale ABC
2003	Neil Perkins	Kirkdale ABC
2004	Vin Raj	Leicester Youth ABC
2005	James DeGale	Dale Youth ABC
2006	James DeGale	Dale Youth ABC
2007	George Groves	Dale Youth ABC
2008	George Groves	Dale Youth ABC
2009	Hosea Burton	Jimmy Egan's ABC
2010	Anthony Ogogo	Triple A ABC
2011	John Dignum	Brentwood Youth ABC
2012	Danny Dignum	Brentwood Youth ABC
2013	Adam Farrell	Salisbury ABC
2014	Anthony Fowler	Golden Gloves ABC
2015	Troy Williamson	Darlington ABC
2016	Benjamin Whittaker	Wodensborough ABC
2017	Benjamin Whittaker	Firewalker Olympic Boxing
2018	Jordan Reynolds	Hoddesden ABC
2019	Mark Dickinson	Birtley ABC
2020	cancelled due to COVID 19.	
2021	Ramtin Musah	Beartown
2022	Dan Toward	Birtley
2023	Stephen Clarke	Rotunda
2024	Marc Haughan	Carlisle Villa
2025	Harley Burrows	March
2026	Oliver Male	Bridlington
