= Les Morgan =

Wales boxer

Personal information
- Nationality: British (Welsh)
- Born: 24 February 1933 (age 93) Risca, Wales
- Weight: Welterweight

Boxing career

Boxing record
- Total fights: 23
- Wins: 18
- Win by KO: 10
- Losses: 5
- Draws: 0
- No contests: 0

Les Morgan (born 24 February 1933) was a Welsh welterweight boxer from Risca, near Newport in South Wales. In 1957, he became Wales welterweight boxing champion.

Morgan won the 1953 Amateur Boxing Association British welterweight title, when boxing out of the Rotax ABC.
