= William Stack (boxer) =

British boxer

Personal information
- Nationality: British
- Born: 30 September 1936; Leamington Spa, England
- Died: 7 August 2013 (aged 76); Leamington Spa, England

Sport
- Sport: Boxing

William Joseph Stack (30 September 1936 – 7 August 2013) was a British boxer. He competed in the men's middleweight event at the 1964 Summer Olympics and fought as Willie Stack. At the 1964 Summer Olympics, he lost in his first fight to Emil Schulz of the United Team of Germany.

Stack won the 1964 Amateur Boxing Association British middleweight title, when boxing out of the Leamington Boys Club.
