= Terence Waller =

British boxer

Personal information
- Nationality: British (English)
- Born: 9 March 1946 (age 80) London, England
- Height: 176 cm (5 ft 9 in)
- Weight: 64 kg (141 lb)

Sport
- Sport: Boxing
- Event: Welterweight
- Club: Lynn ABC, London

Terence Leslie Waller (born 9 March 1946) is a retired boxer from England. He fought as Terry Waller.

== Biography ==
Waller competed in the men's light welterweight event at the 1968 Summer Olympics.

He also epresented the England team at the 1970 British Commonwealth Games in Edinburgh, Scotland, where he participated in the 67 kg welterweight category event.

Waller won five Amateur Boxing Association British titles, the 1967 lightweight title, the 1970, 1973 and 1974 welterweight titles and 1972 light-welterweight title when boxing out of the Lynn ABC.
