= Johnny Maloney =

British boxer

Personal information
- Nationality: British
- Born: 30 May 1932
- Died: 11 September 2004 (aged 72); Havering, Greater London, England

Sport
- Sport: Boxing

John Patrick Maloney (30 May 1932 – September 2004) was a British boxer. He competed in the men's welterweight event at the 1952 Summer Olympics and fought as Johnny Maloney.

Maloney won the 1951 and 1952 Amateur Boxing Association British welterweight title, when boxing out of the Dagenham ABC and Royal Air Force respectively.
