= Walter White (boxer) =

British boxer

Personal information
- Nationality: British (Scottish)
- Born: 19 February 1904; Bathgate, Scotland
- Died: 1984 (aged 79–80)

Sport
- Sport: Boxing

Walter White (19 February 1904 – 1984) was a British boxer. He competed in the men's lightweight event at the 1924 Summer Olympics.

White won the 1924 Amateur Boxing Association British lightweight title, when boxing out of the United Scottish BC.
