= Freddie Whitbread =

British boxer

Personal information
- Nationality: British
- Born: 31 August 1892 Somers Town, London
- Died: 1 January 1939 (aged 46) Battersea, London

Sport
- Sport: Boxing

Frederick William Whitbread (31 August 1892 – 1 January 1939) was a British boxer. He fought under the name Freddie Whitbread He competed in the men's welterweight event at the 1920 Summer Olympics.

Whitbread won the 1920 Amateur Boxing Association British welterweight title, when boxing out of the Fulham ABC.
