= Gilbody =

Gilbody may refer to:

- George Gilbody (born 1955), British boxer
- Ray Gilbody (born 1960), British boxer
