= Roy Addison =

British boxer (1939–2021)

Personal information
- Nationality: British
- Born: 17 January 1939; Tipton, West Midlands, England
- Died: 22 February 2021 (aged 82); Tipton, West Midlands, England
- Height: 1.77 m (5 ft 10 in)
- Weight: 75 kg (165 lb)

Sport
- Sport: Boxing

Roy Addison (17 February 1939 – 22 February 2021) was a British boxer.

== Biography ==
He competed in the 1960 Summer Olympics in the middleweight classification. Addison won the 1960 Amateur Boxing Association British middleweight title, when boxing for the Royal Air Force.

He owned a business called Addison Tyres and died in February 2021.

=== 1960 Olympic results ===
- Round of 32: bye
- Round of 16: lost to Hans Buchi (Switzerland) by decision, 1-4.
