= England Boxing National Amateur Championships Welterweight Champions =

English Boxing competition

England Boxing National Amateur Championships Welterweight Champions (U65kg)
- Status: active
- Genre: Boxing
- Inaugurated: 1920
- Organiser: England Boxing

The England Boxing National Amateur Championships Welterweight Championship formerly known as the ABA Championships is the primary English amateur boxing championship. It had previously been contested by all the nations of the United Kingdom.

== History ==
The welterweight division was inaugurated in 1920 and is currently contested in the under 65 kg weight division. The championships are highly regarded in the boxing world and seen as the most prestigious national amateur championships.

== Past winners ==
Year	Winner	Club
1920	Freddie Whitbread	Fulham ABC
1921	Alexander Ireland	United Scottish BC
1922	Edward White	Limehouse & Polar ABC
1923	Phil Green	Avery's ABC
1924	Patrick O'Hanrahan	Polytechnic ABC
1925	Patrick O'Hanrahan	Polytechnic Boxing Club
1926	Ben Marshall	Newport Wales ABC
1927	Harry Dunn	Lynn ABC
1928	Harold Bone	Columbia RC & H Div. Met. Police ABC
1929	Sgt. Tim Wigmore	Royal Scots
1930	Fred Brooman	Northampton Institute ABC
1931	J.P. Barry	Gainsford ABC
1932	Dave McCleave	Lynn ABC
1933	L/Sgt. T. B. (Paddy) Peters	First Battalion Irish Guards
1934	Dave McCleave	Lynn ABC
1935	Danny Lynch	Fisher ABC & Surrey Commercial Docks ABC
1936	Wally Pack	Polytechnic Boxing Club
1937	Danny Lynch	Fisher ABC & Surrey Commercial Docks ABC
1938	Charlie Webster	St. Pancras ABC
1939	Dick Thomas	Derby Police & Penarth Central ABC
1940-42	Not held due to World War II	
1943	Tommy Quill	Harrow & Rugby ABC
1944	Henry Hall	Hillsborough ABC
1945	Randolph Turpin	Leamington Spa ABC
1946	C.S.M. Johnny Ryan	Army
1947	C.S.M.I. Johnny Ryan	Army
1948	Max Shacklady	Eccles ABC
1949	Alan Buxton	Harrow ABC
1950	A/C Terry Ratcliffe	Royal Air Force
1951	Johnny Maloney	Dagenham ABC
1952	A/C Johnny Maloney	Royal Air Force
1953	Les Morgan	Rotax ABC
1954	Pte. Nicky Gargano	Army
1955	Pte. Nicky Gargano	Army
1956	Nicky Gargano	Covent Gardens ABC
1957	Pte. Ron Warnes	Army
1958	Cpl. Brian Nancurvis	Army
1959	Cpl. Jimmy McGrail	Royal Air Force
1960	Colin Humphreys	Porthcawl ABC
1961	Tony Lewis	St. Pancras ABC
1962	Johnny Pritchett	Bingham ABC
1963	Johnny Pritchett	Bingham & District ABC
1964	Michael Varley	Clifton ABC
1965	Peter B. Henderson	Robert Browning ABC
1966	Peter Cragg	Electrolux ABC
1967	Dave Cranswick	Sea Cadet Corps
1968	David Martyn	BDS ABC
1969	Terry Henderson	Robert Browning ABC
1970	Terry Waller	Lynn ABC
1971	Dave Davies	Bangor YMCA BC
1972	Trevor Francis	Basingstoke ABC
1973	Terry Waller	Lynn ABC
1974	Terry Waller	Lynn ABC
1975	Wayne Bennett	New Tredegar ABC
1976	Colin Jones	Penyrheol ABC
1977	Colin Jones	Penyrheol ABC
1978	Edward Byrne	Leamington Boys ABC
1979	Joey Frost	Rotunda ABC
1980	Terry Marsh	Royal Navy
1981	Terry Marsh	Royal Navy
1982	Chris Pyatt	Belgrave ABC
1983	Bob McKenley	Cavendish ABC
1984	Mickey Hughes	St. Pancras ABC
1985	Errol McDonald	Ruddington ABC
1986	Darren Dyer	St. Monica's ABC
1987	Mark Elliott	GKN Sankey ABC
1988	Mark McCreath	Bracebridge ABC
1989	Mark Elliott	Bennett's Bank ABC
1990	Adrian Carew	Lynn ABC
1991	Joe Calzaghe	Newbridge ABC
1992	Mark Santini	Birmingham City ABC
1993	Chris Bessey	Army
1994	Kevin Short	Army
1995	Michael Hall	Darlington ABC
1996	Jawaid Khaliq	Meadows & Ruddington ABC
1997	Francie Barrett	Trojan ABC
1998	David Walker	Fisher ABC
1999	Anthony Cesay	Repton ABC
2000	Francis Doherty	Kingsthorpe Boys ABC
2001	Matthew Macklin	Small Heath ABC
2002	Vin Raj	Leicester Youth ABC
2003	Daniel Happe	Honor Oak ABC
2004	Martin Murray	St. Helen's Town ABC
2005	Brett Flourney	Army
2006	Denton Vassell	Fox ABC
2007	Joe Selkirk	Rotunda ABC
2008	Anthony Ogogo	Triple A ABC
2009	Liam Cameron	Steel City ABC
2010	Dudley O'Shaughnessy	West Ham ABC
2011	Damon Jones	West Leeds ABC
2012	Tamuka Muchapondwa	Reading ABC
2013	Jeff Saunders	Army
2014	Conor Loftus	Burmantofts ABC
2015	Conor Loftus	Burmantofts ABC
2016	Carl Fail	Far Cotton ABC
2017	Harris Akbar	Bradford Police
2018	Harris Akbar	Bradford College/Police
2019	Harvey Lambert	St Paul's ABC
2020	cancelled due to COVID-19.	
2021	Patrick Hewitt	Leigh ABC
2022	Huey Malone	Christ The King
2023	Huey Malone	Christ The King
2024	Lucas Biswana	Everton Red Triangle
2025	Luke Prior	Marybone
2026	Amo Singh	Repton
