= Boxing at the 1908 Summer Olympics – Heavyweight =

Boxing competitions

Men's heavyweight boxing at the Games of the IV Olympiad
- Date: October 27, 1908
- Competitors: 6 from 1 nation

Medalists
1st place, gold medalist(s)		Albert Oldman	Great Britain
2nd place, silver medalist(s)		Sydney Evans	Great Britain
3rd place, bronze medalist(s)		Frederick Parks	Great Britain

The heavyweight was one of five boxing weight classes contested on the boxing at the 1908 Summer Olympics programme. Like all other boxing events, it was open only to men. The boxing competitions were all held on October 27. The heavyweight was the middle class, allowing boxers of any weight. Six boxers all from Great Britain competed. Each NOC could enter up to 12 boxers. France entered 1 boxer, who withdrew; Great Britain entered 7 boxers, 1 of whom withdrew, and the Netherlands entered 1 boxer, who withdrew.

== Competition format ==
There were three rounds in each bout, with the first two rounds being three minutes long and the last one going four minutes. Two judges scored the match, giving 5 points to the better boxer in each of the first two rounds and 7 to the better boxer in the third round. Marks were given to the other boxer in proportion to how well he did compared to the better. If the judges were not agreed on a winner at the end of the bout, the referee could either choose the winner or order a fourth round.

== Results ==
=== Bracket ===
Quarterfinals; October 27		Semifinals; October 27		Final; October 27
Sydney Evans (GBR)	KO1
Albert Ireton (GBR)	L	Sydney Evans (GBR)	2
Frederick Parks (GBR)	2	Frederick Parks (GBR)	1
Harold Brewer (GBR)	0			Sydney Evans (GBR)	L
Albert Oldman (GBR)	KO1			Albert Oldman (GBR)	KO1
Isaac Myrans (GBR)	L	Albert Oldman (GBR)	-
		Bye	-

Did not start: A. Goy of France; Johnny Douglas of Great Britain; Herman de By of the Netherlands

=== Quarterfinals ===
Oldman and Evans both won in the first round, Oldman winning with a right to Myrams' chin and Evans winning with a left to the chest of Ireton. Frederick Parks and Brewer went the full three, with Parks doing the majority of the hitting but Brewer taking it well.

=== Semifinals ===
Oldman received a bye for the round. Frederick Parks, who had given most of the punishment in the quarterfinals, found the situation reversed in the semifinals. Evans knocked him out of the ring once and to the mat twice. Parks fought hard, however, and not only made it through the three rounds but managed to land enough punches to deadlock the judges. Evans won by the referee's decision.

=== Final ===
In a somewhat anticlimactic final, Oldman put Evans on the rope shortly into the first, landing blow after blow to Evans' face. Within two minutes, Evans had dropped.

== Standings ==
Rank	Boxer	Nation
1st place, gold medalist(s)	Albert Oldman	Great Britain
2nd place, silver medalist(s)	Sydney Evans	Great Britain
3rd place, bronze medalist(s)	Frederick Parks	Great Britain
4	Harold Brewer	Great Britain
4	Albert Ireton	Great Britain
4	Isaac Myrans	Great Britain

== Sources ==
- Official Report of the Games of the IV Olympiad (1908).
- De Wael, Herman. Herman's Full Olympians: "Boxing 1908". Accessed 8 April 2006. Available electronically at.
