= Bert Brewer =

British boxer (1876–1946)

Personal information
- Nationality: British
- Born: 21 November 1876 Islington, London
- Died: March quarter 1946 (aged 69) Edmonton, London

Sport
- Sport: Boxing

Herbert Brewer (21 November 1876 – 1946) was a British boxer. He competed in the men's heavyweight event at the 1908 Summer Olympics.

Brewer won the Amateur Boxing Association 1899 lightweight title and the 1907 heavyweight title, boxing out of the Polytechnic Boxing Club.
