= Arthur Murdoch =

British boxer

Personal information
- Nationality: British
- Born: 14 January 1882
- Died: 5 October 1960 (aged 78)

Sport
- Sport: Boxing

Arthur Murdoch (14 January 1882 – 5 October 1960) was a British boxer. He competed in the men's middleweight event at the 1908 Summer Olympics.

Murdoch won the Amateur Boxing Association 1906 middleweight title, when boxing out of the Belsize ABC.
