= Pickles Douglas =

English boxing referee and cricketer

Personal information
- Full name: Cecil Herbert Douglas
- Born: 26 June 1886; Clapton, London, England
- Died: 30 September 1954 (aged 68); Frinton-on-Sea, Essex, England
- Batting: Right-handed
- Role: Bowler

Domestic team information
- Years: Team
- 1912–1919: Essex

Career statistics
Competition	FC
Matches	21
Runs scored	326
Batting average
100s/50s
Top score
Balls bowled
Wickets	6
Bowling average
5 wickets in innings
10 wickets in match
Best bowling
Catches/stumpings
- Source: Cricinfo, 22 July 2013

Cecil Herbert "Pickles" Douglas (28 June 1886 – 30 September 1954) was an English boxing referee and a cricketer. He played for Essex between 1912 and 1919.

'Pickles' Douglas was a leading boxing referee for many years, handling contest including Jack Doyle v. Jack Petersen, 1933; the two Len Harvey v. Jack Petersen fights, 1933 and 1934; Primo Carnera v. George Cook, 1932; and George Cook v. Joe Beckett, 1922.

== Family ==
He was the son of John H. Douglas, a prominent personality at the Covent Garden club, and brother of J. W. H. T. Douglas, who won the ABA amateur middle-weight boxing championship in 1905, the Olympic middleweight title in 1908 and afterwards captained the Essex county cricket eleven and England.
