= William Childs =

William Childs may refer to:

- William Childs (restaurateur), co-founder of Childs Restaurants
- William Macbride Childs (1869–1939), academic and historian
- William Harold Joseph Childs, British physicist and academic author
- Billy Childs (William Edward Childs, born 1957), musician
- William Childs (boxer), British boxer
- William Childs House, in the National Register of Historic Places listings in Riverside County, California

== See also ==
- William Child (disambiguation)
- George William Childs (1829–1894), US publisher
