= William Child (disambiguation) =

William Child was a composer.

William Child may also refer to:

- William Child (boxer), British boxer
- William Child (MP) (died c.1398), MP for New Romney
- William Child of Northwick, High Sheriff of Worcestershire in 1586 or 1587
- William Child, High Sheriff of Shropshire in 1784
- William Child, owner and 16th-century Lord of Cofton Hackett

== See also ==
- William Child-Villiers
- William Childs (disambiguation)
