= Walter Edgeworth-Johnstone =

Irish boxer and police commissioner

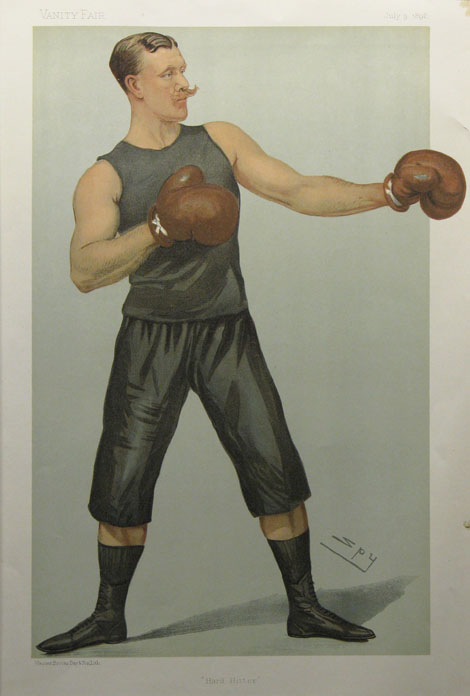
- "Hard Hitter"; Edgeworth-Johnstone as caricatured by Spy (Leslie Ward) in Vanity Fair, July 1896

Personal information
- Nationality: Irish
- Born: 24 June 1863 Kingstown, County Dublin, Ireland
- Died: 4 January 1936 (aged 72)

Sport
- Sport: boxing

Lieutenant-Colonel Sir Walter Edgeworth-Johnstone KBE CB (24 June 1863 – 4 January 1936) was an Irish sportsman and police official who held the Amateur Boxing Association of England 1895 and 1896 heavyweight titles. He was chief commissioner of the Dublin Metropolitan Police from 1915 to 1923.

== Life ==
He was born Walter Johnston in 1863 in Kingstown (now Dún Laoghaire), County Dublin, Ireland. He later changed his name by deed poll to Edgeworth-Johnstone. In 1895 and 1896 he was Amateur Boxing Association of England heavyweight champion. He was also an excellent footballer and cricket player, and won numerous titles in fencing, including the sabre title at the 1898 and 1900 British Fencing Championships.

He was commissioned a lieutenant in the Royal Irish Regiment on 25 August 1886, and promoted to captain on 5 April 1893. In February 1900 he was appointed to act temporarily as assistant inspector of gymnasia at Aldershot. He transferred to the Curragh Camp where he was superintendent of gymnasia from 5 February 1901 to 30 September 1902. He returned to his regiment in January 1903.

Edgeworth-Johnstone was chief commissioner of the Dublin Metropolitan Police from 1915 to 1923. The unarmed Dublin Metropolitan Police stayed largely neutral during the Irish War of Independence.

=== Honours ===
Edgeworth-Johnstone was named a companion of the Order of the Bath in the 1918 New Year Honours. He was invested as a Knight Commander of the Order of the British Empire in 1924, and promoted to lieutenant-colonel.

=== Personal life ===
In 1897, Edgeworth-Johnstone married Helen Gunning Walker Waters. They had two sons and two daughters. One of his sons was Robert Edgeworth-Johnstone, a chemical engineer. Walter Edgeworth-Johnstone died 4 January 1936 in Regent's Park Terrace, London.

Police appointments
Preceded by	Chief Commissioner of the Dublin Metropolitan Police; 1915–1923	Succeeded by W. R. E. Murphy
