= Val Barker =

English boxer

Personal information
- Nationality: British (English)
- Born: 4 December 1866; Hammersmith, London, England
- Died: 3 June 1941 (aged 74); Norwich, Norfolk, England

Sport
- Sport: boxing

Valentine Barker was a boxer from England, who competed in the Heavyweight division during his career as an amateur.

== Amateur career ==
Barker was a British amateur boxer who won the Amateur Boxing Association of England, 1891 heavyweight title, boxing out of the Belsize ABC.

== Life after boxing ==
Barker would later become involved in amateur boxing in Great Britain, and was the first Honorary Secretary of the Federation Internationale de Boxe Amateur in 1920. He was president of the ABA from 1926 to 1929. In 1936, the Val Barker Trophy was dedicated in his honour, and is presented to the outstanding boxer at the Olympic Games. He died in 1941.
