= International cricket in 1911–12 =

International cricket season

The 1911–12 international cricket season was from September 1911 to April 1912. The season consists with single international tour.

== Season overview ==
International tours
Start date	Home team	Away team	Results [Matches]			
Start date	Home team	Away team	Test	ODI	FC	LA
15 December 1911	Australia	England	1–4 [5]	—	—	—

== December ==
=== England in Australia ===
The Ashes Test series
No.	Date	Home captain	Away captain	Venue	Result
Test 116	15–28 December	Clem Hill	Johnny Douglas	Sydney Cricket Ground, Sydney	Australia by 146 runs
Test 117	30 Dec–3 January	Clem Hill	Johnny Douglas	Melbourne Cricket Ground, Melbourne	England by 8 wickets
Test 118	12–17 January	Clem Hill	Johnny Douglas	Adelaide Oval, Adelaide	England by 7 wickets
Test 119	9–13 February	Clem Hill	Johnny Douglas	Melbourne Cricket Ground, Melbourne	England by an innings and 225 runs
Test 120	23 Feb–1 March	Clem Hill	Johnny Douglas	Sydney Cricket Ground, Sydney	England by 70 runs
