= Frank Parks =

British amateur heavyweight boxer (1875–1945)

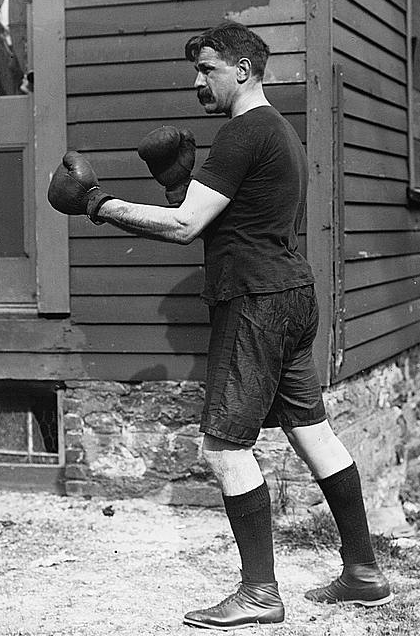
- Parks circa 14 May 1911
- Born: March 1875; London, England
- Died: 22 May 1945 (aged 70); Hampstead, London, England
- Known for: British amateur heavyweight champion
- Height: 5 ft 11 in (180 cm)

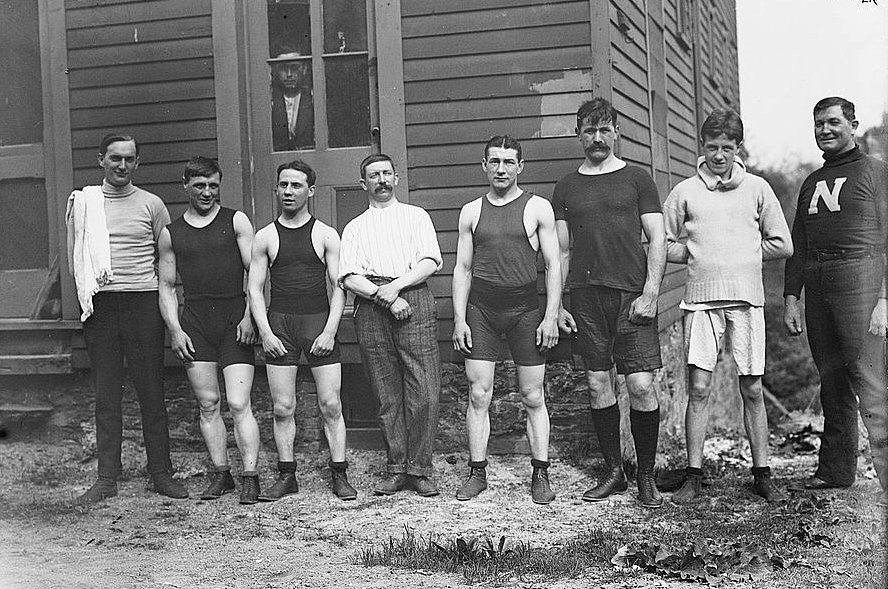
Hayes the trainer; Reuben Charles Warnes; W. W. Allen; secretary Edward T. Calver of the ABA; Alfred Spenceley; Frank Parks; Ralph Erskine; and Murray the trainer circa 14 May 1911

Francis George Parks (March 1875 – 22 May 1945) was a British amateur heavyweight boxer. He joined the Polytechnic Boxing Club in 1892 and won the Studd Trophy in 1902. He also won a bronze medal at the 1908 Summer Olympics.

== Biography ==
He was born in March 1875 in London, England, to George Parks and Eliza Ann Barrington. Around 1896, he married Ada Sarah Waller in London, and they had the following children: Maud Lilian Parks (1897–1983), Francis George Parks (1898–?); Rose Gladys Parks (1900–?), Ivy Mary Parks (1904–?), and Olive Eva Parks (1907–1991). He was the ABA Heavyweight Champion in 1899, 1901, 1902, 1905 and 1906.

In 1911, he and Reuben Charles Warnes went to the United States with the Amateur Boxing Association of England to fight in Madison Square Garden in a series of exhibition bouts. In one of the 1911 matches in the United States he lost to William Spengler in three rounds on a referee's decision.

He died on 22 May 1945 in Hampstead, in a car crash.

== Championships ==
- Amateur Boxing Association of England heavyweight championships in 1899, 1901, 1902, 1905 and 1906.
- French Boxing Championship in 1905.

== Legacy ==
A plaque in the shape of a laurel wreath was dedicated to Frank Parks by the Polytechnic Boxing Club "as a token of admiration by his many friends for his high example and untiring effort for the welfare of the this [sic?] club for 52 years". The plaque is dated 7 November 1946.

== See also ==
- Manifest with Frank Parks arriving in United States
- Back of manifest with Frank Parks arriving in United States

| Preceded by Geoff Townsend | ABA Heavyweight Champion; 1899 | Succeeded by William J. Dees |
| Preceded by William J. Dees | ABA Heavyweight Champion; 1901–1902 | Succeeded by Edward Dickson |
| Preceded by Archibald Herbert Horner | ABA Heavyweight Champion; 1905–1906 | Succeeded by Bert Brewer |
