= Patrick O'Hanrahan =

British boxer

Patrick O'Hanrahan (Patrick Zöller)
Personal information
- Nationality: British (English)
- Born: 12 November 1894 Westminster, London
- Died: 1963 Hammersmith, London

Sport
- Sport: boxing
Medal record
Representing Great Britain
Men's Boxing

Patrick Philip O'Hanrahan (12 November 1894 – 1963) also known as Patrick Zöller until 1921, was a British boxer who competed in the 1924 Summer Olympics. Some records, notable among them The Times, give his name as O'Halloran.

== Boxing career ==
O'Hanrahan won the 1924 Amateur Boxing Association British welterweight title, when boxing out of the Polytechnic Boxing Club.

Two months later at the 1924 Summer Olympics he advanced to the second round of the welterweight class after winning his fight against René Dubois of France on points. The matches were held in the Veledrome d'Hiver. In the next round, O'Hanrahan was defeated by Jean Delarge of Belgium who won the gold medal in this weight class. It was O'Hanrahan's only Olympic appearance. The decision was not without its controversy as was the case with the boxing decisions against the British as a whole (not to mention fencing), according to The Times. "O'Halloran is universally considered by our men to have been very unlucky to have had the verdict given against him in a fight against a Belgian yesterday."

The following year in 1925 he retained his A.B.A. British welterweight title.

=== 1924 Olympic results ===
Below is the record of Patrick O'Hanrahan, a British welterweight boxer who competed at the 1924 Paris Olympics:

- Round of 32: defeated Rene Dubois (France) by decision
- Round of 16: lost to Jean Delarge (Belgium) by decision

== Personal life ==
He changed his name from Zöller to his mother's maiden name O'Hanrahan in 1920.
