= René Dubois =

French boxer

René Dubois (born 30 January 1906, date of death unknown) was a French boxer who competed in the 1924 Summer Olympics.

In 1924 he was eliminated in the first round of the welterweight class after losing his fight to Patrick O'Hanrahan of Great Britain on points. The matches were held in the Veledrome d'Hiver. In the next round, O'Hanrahan was defeated by Jean Delarge of Belgium who win the gold medal in this weight class.
