= William Philo =

English boxer (1882–1916)

Olympic medal record

Men's Boxing
| Bronze medal – third place | 1908 London | Middleweight |

William Philo (17 February 1882 in Islington, United Kingdom – 7 July 1916 in France) was a British Middleweight professional boxer who competed in the early twentieth century. He won a bronze medal in Boxing at the 1908 Summer Olympics, losing against Reginald Baker in the semi-finals. He served in the British Army with the 8th Battalion, Royal Fusiliers and was posted missing, aged 34, during the Battle of the Somme in France on 7 July 1916 as a Company Serjeant Major. His remains were not recovered, and his name is recorded on the Thiepval Memorial.

== 1908 Olympic results ==
Below is the record of William Philo, a British middleweight boxer who competed at the 1908 London Olympics:

- Round of 16: defeated Arthur Murdoch (Great Britain) by decision, 2-1
- Quarterfinal: bye
- Semifinal: lost to Reginald Baker (Australia & New Zealand) by first-round knockout (was awarded bronze medal)

== See also ==
- List of Olympians killed in World War I
