= W. R. E. Murphy =

Irish soldier and police commissioner

William Richard English Murphy DSO, MC
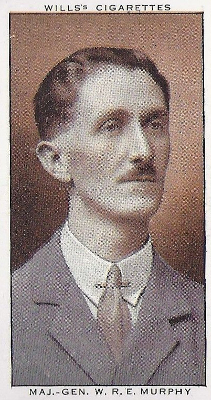
- WRE Murphy, as depicted on a Wills' cigarette card.

Commissioner, Dublin Metropolitan Police
- In office May 1923 – 1925
- Preceded by: Walter Edgeworth-Johnstone
- Succeeded by: Office abolished

Deputy Commissioner, Garda Síochána
- In office 1925–1955

Personal details
- Born: 26 January 1890 County Wexford, Ireland
- Died: 5 March 1975 (aged 85) Ardee, County Louth, Republic of Ireland
- Resting place: St. Peter's Church, Bray, County Wicklow
- Spouse: Mary Agnes Fortune
- Military service
- Allegiance: United Kingdom; Ireland
- Service: British Army; National Army (Ireland)
- Service years: 1915-1919 (British Army); 1922-1923 (National Army)
- Rank: Lieutenant Colonel (British Army); Major General (National Army)
- Unit: South Staffordshire Regiment (British Army)
- Commands: 2-in-C, South-Western Command; GOC, Kerry Command; Director of Operations; (National Army)
- Conflicts: First World War; Battle of Loos; Battle of the Somme; Battle of Passchendaele; Battle of Vittorio Veneto; Irish Civil War; Battle of Killmallock
- Awards: Distinguished Service Order; Military Cross

Major General William Richard English-Murphy, DSO, MC known as W.R.E. Murphy (26 January 1890 – 5 March 1975) was an Irish soldier and policeman. He served as an officer with the British Army in World War I and later in the National Army. He was the last Commissioner of the Dublin Metropolitan Police before its merger with the Garda Síochána in 1925. Thereafter he was the Deputy Commissioner of the Gardaí until his retirement in 1955.

== British Army ==
Murphy was born in Danecastle, Bannow, County Wexford on 26 January 1890. His parents died when he was 4, and his grandparents died when he was a child. He and his sister Mae (Mary Sarah) were separately raised by relatives in Belfast and Waterford. He was completing his master's degree at Queen's University Belfast when he followed the call of John Redmond to join the war effort and ensure Irish Independence. He joined the British Army in Queen's UOTC in 1915 and was commissioned later that year. Ulster Regiments rejected him because he was Catholic, and seeking a regiment that treated Irish volunteers with respect, he transferred to the South Staffordshire Regiment.

He served in the Battle of Loos in 1915 and was wounded, but returned to action for the start of the Battle of the Somme in July 1916, where he was promoted to captain and awarded the Military Cross. In 1917 he served in the Battle of Passchendaele (3rd Ypres). In 1918, he and his battalion were transferred to Italy. Promoted to lieutenant colonel, he become commanding officer of 1st Battalion, South Staffordshire Regiment. He participated in the Piave River where he was awarded the Distinguished Service Order. After the war he returned to Ireland, he resumed his career as a teacher.

== Civil War ==
In December 1921, the Anglo-Irish Treaty was signed between British and Irish leaders, resulting in the setting up of the Irish Free State. Conflict over the Treaty among Irish nationalists ultimately led to the outbreak of the Civil War in June 1922.

Murphy was invited by Michael Collins to join the new National Army of the Irish Free State. In July–August 1922, he was second in command to Eoin O'Duffy at the Battle of Killmallock. While victorious over the anti-Treaty IRA, Murphy was criticised for his tendency to 'dig in' and resort to trench warfare rather than rapid offensive action.

Afterwards, he was put in overall command of Irish Free State forces in County Kerry until January 1923. He lobbied Richard Mulcahy, commander in chief, for 250 extra troops, to bring his command up to 1,500 and help to put down the guerrilla resistance there. In the early stages of the guerrilla war, he organised large-scale 'sweeps' to break up the republican concentrations in west Cork and east Kerry. These met with little success, however. Murphy exercised overall command in the county but day-to-day operations were largely run by Brigadier Paddy Daly, of the Dublin Guard. In October, in response to continuing guerrilla attacks on his troops, Murphy ordered a curfew to be put into place in Tralee from 10:30 until 5:30 every night.

On 20 December, Murphy sentenced four captured republican fighters to death under the Public Safety Act for possession of arms and ammunition. However, the sentences were to be called off if local guerrilla activity ceased. Humphrey Murphy, the local IRA Brigade commander, threatened to shoot eight named government supporters in reprisal if the men were executed. He commuted their sentence to penal servitude, for which he was reprimanded by general headquarters. In December, Murphy prematurely reported to Mulcahy that the "Irregular [Anti-Treaty] organisation here is well nigh broken up". In January 1923, Paddy Daly took over as commanding officer in Kerry. Murphy later voiced the opinion that Daly had been a bad choice, given his implication in the Ballyseedy massacre and other events of March 1923, in which up to 30 anti-Treaty prisoners were killed in the county.

== Police career ==
Transferred to Dublin after leaving Kerry, Murphy was unhappy in his role, and in May 1923 was appointed commissioner of the Dublin Metropolitan Police. He established what became the special branch of the Garda Síochána. He worked with Frank Duff of the Legion of Mary, a Roman Catholic organisation, and Fr. R.S. Devane to close down the Monto red light district in 1925. In 1925, the DMP was merged with the Garda Síochána and Murphy was appointed deputy commissioner, serving until his retirement in 1955. During the Emergency he organised the Local Security Force.

== Personal life ==
Murphy was a keen boxer, and was president of the Irish Amateur Boxing Association for several years. He helped raised funds for the National Stadium.

He married Mary Agnes Fortune of Enniscorthy in 1918. After she died in 1958, he spent his last years in Ardee with his daughter Joan McMahon and her family. He died on 5 March 1975, and is buried in St. Peter's cemetery, Bray.

Police appointments
Preceded by Walter Edgeworth-Johnstone	Chief Commissioner of the Dublin Metropolitan Police; 1923–1925	Office abolished and the D.M.P. merged with the Garda Síochána
