= Alf Matthews (boxer) =

Boxer who competed for England

Personal information
- Nationality: British (English)
- Born: 7 October 1938 Lancashire, England
- Died: November 1997 (aged 59) Liverpool, England

Sport
- Sport: Boxing
- Event: Middleweight
- Club: Litherland ABC, Liverpool

Alfred John Matthews (7 October 1938 – November 1997), was a male boxer who competed for England. He fought as Alf Matthews.

== Biography ==
Matthews represented the 1962 English team at the 1962 British Empire and Commonwealth Games in Perth, Australia. He competed in the middleweight category, where he lost to John Bukowski of Australia in the preliminary round.

He was a member of the Litherland Amateur Boxing Club and was twice ABA middleweight champion in 1962 and 1963.

He made his professional debut on 11 June 1963 and fought in 13 fights until 1965.
