= Robert Edgeworth-Johnstone =

British chemical engineer and inventor

- Born: 4 February 1900; Dublin, Ireland
- Died: 3 December 1994 (aged 94); Parcé-sur-Sarthe, France
- Education: Manchester College of Technology, University College London
- Spouse: Jessie Greig
- Children: 3
- Engineering career
- Discipline: Chemical engineering
- Significant design: Johnstone Flute

Robert Edgeworth-Johnstone (4 February 1900 – 3 December 1994) was a British chemical engineer and inventor. Born in Dublin, he spent 33 years in industry as a chemical engineer and consultant, working overseas in the oil industry. A keen musician, Edgeworth-Johnstone developed the Johnstone flute, a simple version of the instrument made from the aluminium brass tubing used in oil refineries. The instrument's design was admired by renowned flautist James Galway, but Edgeworth-Johnstone did little with the invention until he published details in a 1993 book.

He later became Lady Trent Professor of Chemical Engineering at the University of Nottingham and was involved in reforming the courses there to be more applicable to industry. Edgeworth-Johnstone retired in 1967 but continued to work to advance engineering education, authoring a 1969 report on the subject for the Institution of Chemical Engineers. In later life he lived in Brighton, where he represented the county of Sussex in pistol shooting, before moving to France, where he died at Parcé-sur-Sarthe.

== Early life ==
Robert Edgeworth-Johnstone was born in Dublin on 4 February 1900. His family were of Anglo-Irish background; his father Sir Walter Edgeworth-Johnstone was a Chief Commissioner of the Dublin Metropolitan Police from 1915 to 1923.

Edgeworth-Johnstone was educated at Wellington College and the Royal Military Academy, Woolwich before he secured a job with the Magadi Soda Company. He worked in factories in Kenya for the next three years and there developed a fascination with chemical engineering. Upon his return to the United Kingdom he pursued an engineering education. Edgeworth-Johnstone was awarded a degree from the Manchester College of Technology and, in 1932, a doctorate from University College London. In 1957 he co-authored Pilot plants, models, and scale-up methods in chemical engineering with Meredith Thring. Edgeworth-Johnstone spent 33 years working in industry as an engineer and consultant.

== Johnstone flute ==
In 1933, whilst working on oil projects in Trinidad, Edgeworth-Johnstone – a keen musician who could play the guitar, mandolin and clavichord – developed a keyless flute. He intended this to be a link between the simple and cheap recorder and the more complicated and expensive Boehm-keyed flute. He made the body of his prototype out of aluminium brass tubing, a cheap material readily available in the oil refineries in which he worked. The innovative mouthpiece was made from a piece of wood (his preference was for West Indian Purpleheart) several inches long that protruded into the tube. The flute had ten holes, arranged in an s-curve, which were covered by use of all the player's fingers and thumbs. One reviewer described this as a disadvantage for the instruments intended use as a stepping stone as it differed from the fingering used for the six-hole recorder and flute. The simple construction and ability for home manufacture were praised. The renowned flautist James Galway was impressed by the design but Edgeworth-Johnstone did little with it until 1993 when he published the details in The Johnstone Flute, a book describing the development and use of the flute.

== University of Nottingham ==
Edgeworth-Johnstone was appointed the first Lady Trent Professor of Chemical Engineering by the University of Nottingham in 1960, despite having no previous university work experience. He took the opportunity to reform the way the subject was taught at the university, seeking feedback from industry and putting greater emphasis on economics, management and administration skills. In this regard he anticipated by 20 years the Finniston Report which implemented widespread reform of engineering teaching. Edgeworth-Johnstone retired in 1967 but continued to work for improvements in engineering education, authoring a 1969 report for the Institution of Chemical Engineers which became a framework for future development in the field.

== Personal life ==
Edgeworth-Johnstone married Jessie Greig in 1932, they had two sons and a daughter together. His wife died in 1981. At the age of 80 he represented the county of Sussex in competitive pistol shooting. In later years Edgeworth-Johnstone moved from his home in Brighton to France, where he died at Parcé-sur-Sarthe on 3 December 1994. The University of Nottingham library has held a collection of his correspondence and papers in its department of manuscripts and special collections since 1982.
