= Alfred Spenceley =

Alf Spenceley
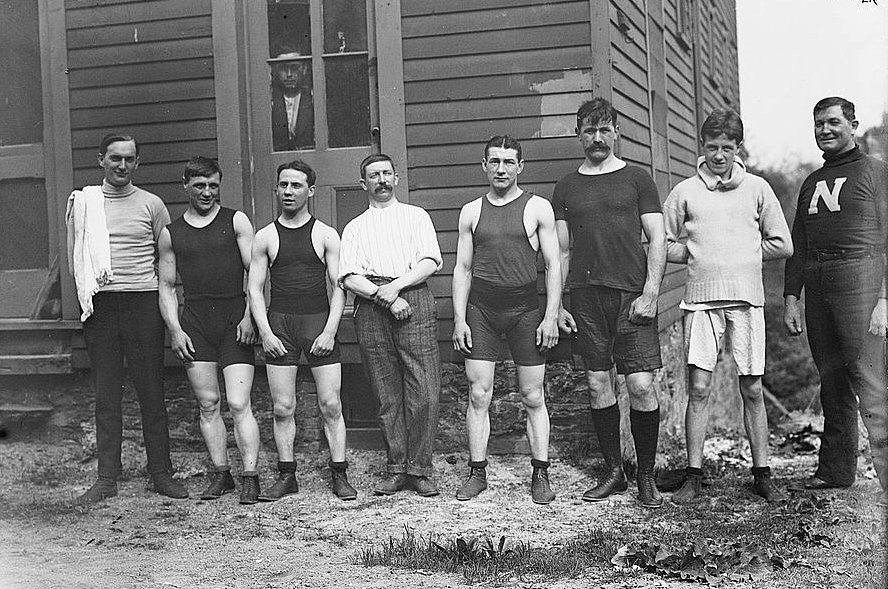
- left to right are: Hayes the trainer; Reuben Charles Warnes; W. W. Allen; secretary Edward T. Calver of the ABA; Alfred Spenceley; Frank Parks; Erskine; and Murray the trainer on 13 May 1911

Personal information
- Nationality: British (English)
- Born: 23 May 1889 Greenwich, London, England
- Died: 18 December 1960 (aged 71) Greenwich, London, England

Sport
- Sport: boxing

Alfred Francis Spenceley (1889–1960) was the Amateur Boxing Association of England lightweight champion in 1911. He fought as Alf Spenceley. He boxed with the Old Goldsmiths Amateur Boxing Club.

== Biography ==
Spenceley won the 1911 Amateur Boxing Association British lightweight title, when boxing out of the Old Goldsmiths ABC.

In 1911 he and Reuben Charles Warnes and Frank Parks went to the United States, with the A.B.A. to fight in Madison Square Garden in a series of exhibition bouts.
