= George Louden =

English cricketer (1885–1972)

Personal information
- Full name: George Marshall Louden
- Born: 6 September 1885; Forest Gate, Essex, England
- Died: 28 December 1972 (aged 87); Amersham, Buckinghamshire, England
- Batting: Right-handed
- Bowling: Right arm fast-medium

Domestic team information
- Years: Team
- 1912–1927: Essex

Career statistics
Competition	First-class
Matches	94
Runs scored	931
Batting average	9.21
100s/50s	0/2
Top score	74
Balls bowled	20,384
Wickets	451
Bowling average	22.35
5 wickets in innings	36
10 wickets in match	5
Best bowling	8/36
Catches/stumpings	62/–
- Source: CricketArchive, 12 January 2023

George Marshall Louden (6 September 1885 – 28 December 1972) was an English amateur cricketer who played first-class cricket for Essex from 1912 to 1927. A right-arm fast-medium bowler, he was very tall at around 190 cm (6 ft 3 in), and although not strongly enough framed to be ideal for long spells on hard wickets, his beautiful bowling action compensated. Even on the exquisite Leyton pitches, he was able to pick up speed and lift the ball sharply, and it could be very challenging if there was a heavy dew or rain that softened the ground.

Owing to business commitments, Louden was usually able to play only seven or eight county matches per season, and most of his cricket was played for the Ilford club. Because the county matches he did play were usually against the strongest batting sides like Surrey, Yorkshire, Middlesex and Lancashire, Louden's career average of 22.35 does not look at all exceptional for an era of uncovered pitches. However, owing to the immense disparities in batting strength among the counties during the 1920s, Louden's average represents much better bowling than many bowlers with much lower averages against weak opposition. Business meant Louden never had the chance to go on a tour to Australia.

== Career ==
Louden first played for Essex in 1912 at a time when Essex bowling was very weak with Claude Buckenham's and Walter Mead's careers nearly over. Despite a couple of promising performances in 1913 and 1914, it was not until 1919 that Louden showed his true class with seven for 42 on an excellent pitch against Lancashire and eight for 122 on a similarly good wicket against Sussex. His 66 wickets for 25 each looked nothing out of the common, but on featherbed Leyton pitches such figures constituted first-rate bowling. Louden was picked for the Gentlemen at Lord's and The Oval but was overshadowed by his teammate Johnny Douglas, taking only one wicket in two games.

In 1920 Louden had an average of over 27, but in the following two seasons he performed well when available. Louden took thirteen wickets in two innings against the Australians in 1921, but was not chosen for any Test match. Australian batsman Warren Bardsley thought it ridiculous that, although the England selectors went through fourteen bowlers that series, they never once turned to the man the Australians regarded as the best in the country. "All we did was tell the truth," he said later. "We told everybody that Louden was England's best bowler. They thought we were leg-pulling and just didn't pick him!" Bardsley and Herbie Collins were always at pains to give one another the strike when Louden was bowling. The following season his performance for the Gentlemen at Lord's in 1922 was the best bowling by an Englishman since Sydney Barnes was in his prime. Louden was equally good against Surrey at The Oval with an innings analyses of seven for 84 on a perfect pitch. Despite these performances, he failed to gain a Wisden Cricketer of the Year nomination.

Although Louden could play a little more often than previously, he declined somewhat in 1923 and 1924 despite replicating his 1922 performance at the Oval with 6 for 66 on another perfect wicket in 1923. He remained a formidable opponent, as shown against the South Africans in 1924 when he took ten wickets, and with nine for 67 on a bad wicket at Lord’s in 1925. Health problems meant Louden played almost no cricket after 1925.

== Personal life ==
George Louden was born on 6 September 1885 in Forest Gate, West Ham, the youngest of the four children of James Louden and Emily née Dilkes. He served in the Royal Naval Volunteer Reserve in the early days of the First World War, and was then commissioned as a Second Lieutenant in the Royal Garrison Artillery, marrying Lucette Edith Shuter (known as Edie) in 1917. He worked as a stockbroker. The couple lived in Amersham, Buckinghamshire, and had no children. He died on 28 December 1972.
