= England Boxing National Amateur Championships Lightweight Champions =

English Boxing competition

England Boxing National Amateur Championships Lightweight Champions (U60kg)
- Status: active
- Genre: Boxing
- Inaugurated: 1881
- Organiser: England Boxing

The England Boxing National Amateur Championships Lightweight Championship formerly known as the ABA Championships is the primary English amateur boxing championship. It had previously been contested by all the nations of the United Kingdom.

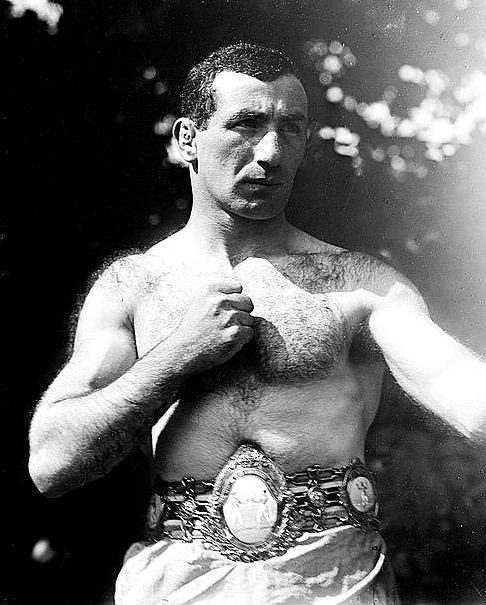
Matt Wells, four times champion from 1904 to 1907

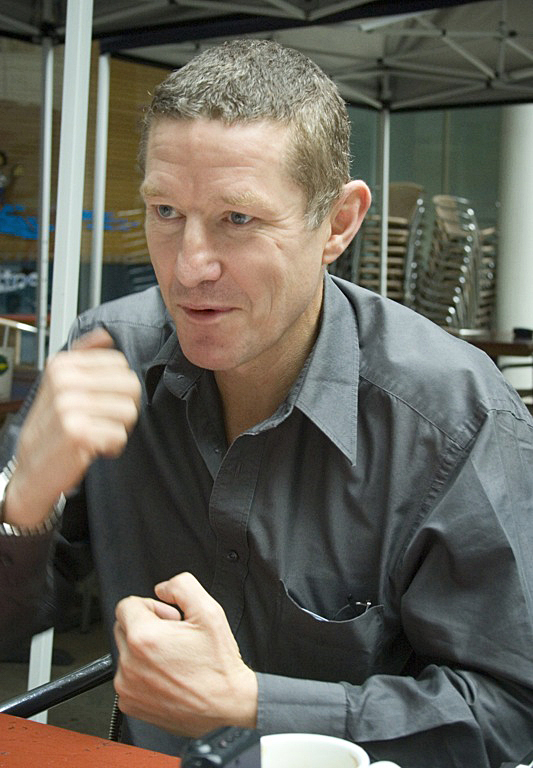
Terry Marsh, 1978 ABA champion

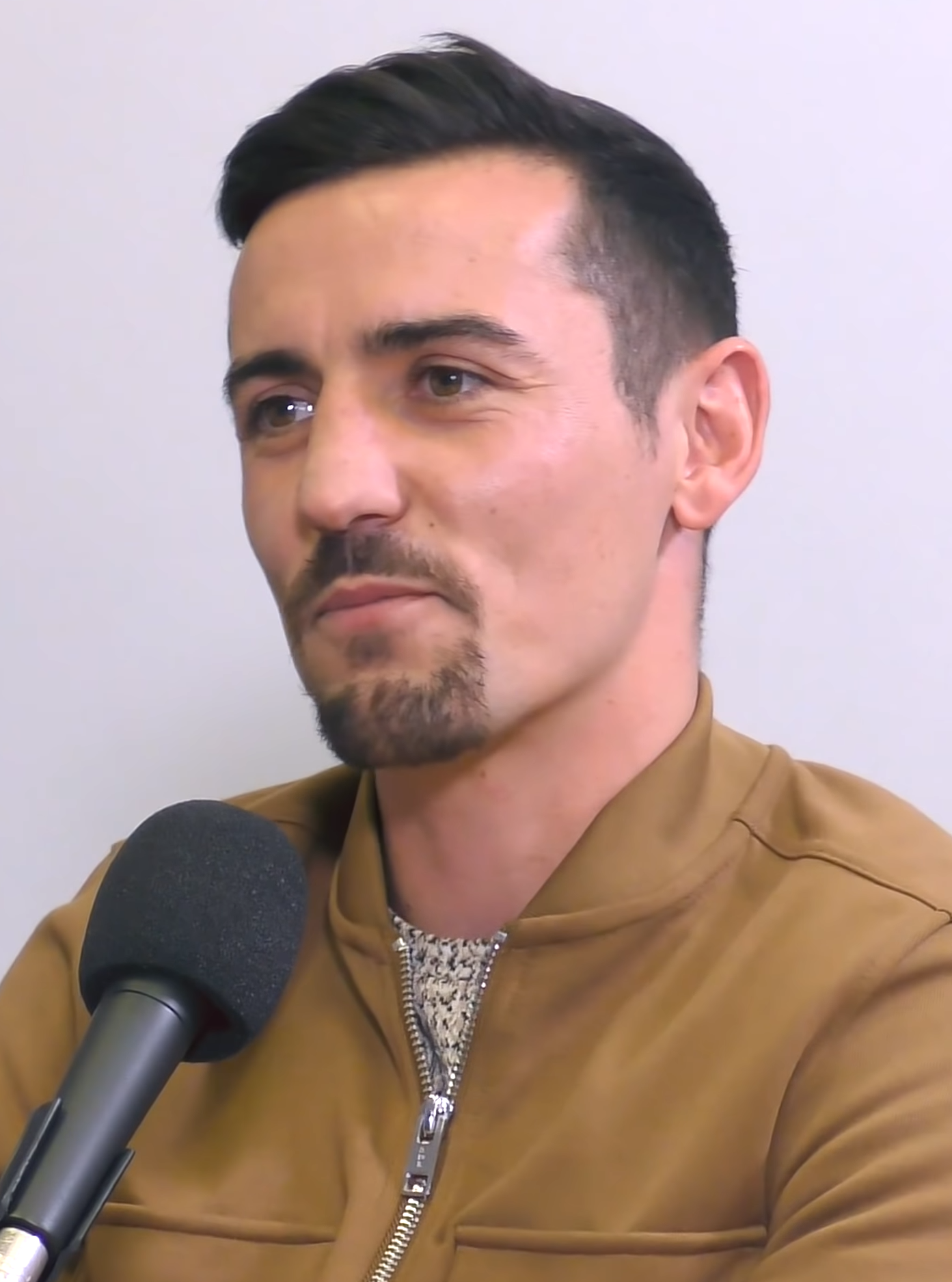
Anthony Crolla won the title in 2006

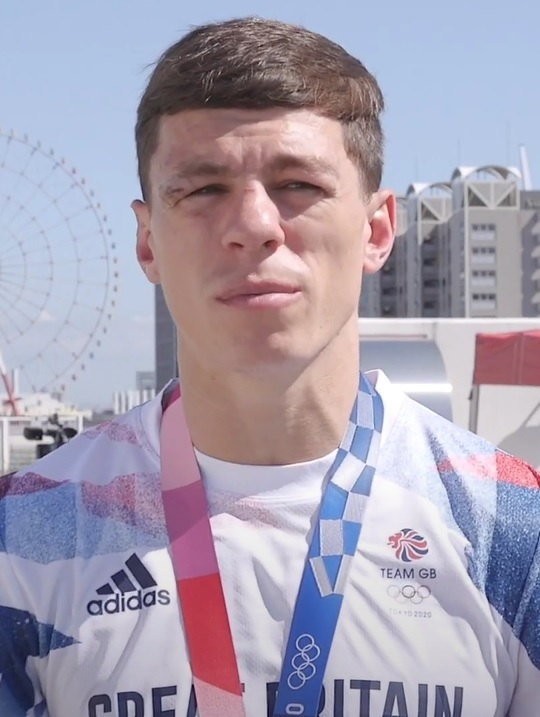
Pat McCormack won the title in 2014 and his twin brother Luke won the following year

== History ==
The lightweight division was inaugurated in 1881 and is currently contested in the under 60 Kg weight division. The championships are highly regarded in the boxing world and seen as the most prestigious national amateur championships.

== Past winners ==
Year	Winner	Club
1881	Fred M. Hobday	Clapton ABC
1882	Arthur Frederick Bettinson	GGS ABC
1883	Anthony Diamond	Birmingham ABC
1884	Anthony Diamond	Birmingham ABC
1885	Anthony Diamond	Birmingham ABC
1886	Charley J. Roberts	Royal Victor ABC
1887	John Hair	North London ABC
1888	Andrew Newton	St. Pancras ABC
1889	William Neale	Birmingham ABC
1890	Andrew J. Newton	Isledon ABC
1891	Ernest Charles Dettmer	Stanhope ABC
1892	Ernest Charles Dettmer	Stanhope ABC
1893	William Campbell	Battersea ABC
1894	William Campbell	Battersea ABC
1895	Alf Randall	Battersea ABC
1896	Abraham Vanderhout	Lynn / Sydney ABC
1897	Abraham Vanderhout	Lynn / Sydney ABC
1898	Harry Marks	Cardiff Harlequins BC
1899	Bert Brewer	Polytechnic ABC
1900	G. W. Humphries	Lynn & Battersea ABC
1901	Arthur Warner	Highgate Harriers ABC
1902	Arthur Warner	Highgate Harriers ABC
1903	Harold Fergus	Edinburgh Harriers BC
1904	Matt Wells	Lynn ABC
1905	Matt Wells	Lynn ABC
1906	Matt Wells	Lynn ABC
1907	Matt Wells	Lynn ABC
1908	Harry Holmes	Polytechnic Boxing Club
1909	Fred Grace	Eton Mission ABC
1910	Tom Tees	Lynn ABC
1911	Alf Spenceley	Old Goldsmiths ABC
1912	Robert H. Marriott	Stansfield ABC
1913	Fred Grace	Eton Mission ABC
1914	Robert H. Marriott	Stansfield ABC
1915-18	Not held	
1919	Fred Grace	Eton Old Boys ABC
1920	Fred Grace	Eton Old Boys ABC
1921	George Shorter	Clapton Federation ABC
1922	George B. Renouf	Leith Victoria ABC
1923	George Shorter	Clapton Federation ABC
1924	Walter White	United Scottish BC
1925	Sgmn. Alec Viney	Royal Signals
1926	Tommy Slater	Oxford & Bermondsey Old Boys ABC
1927	W. J. Hunt	Holloway ABC
1928	Fred Webster	St. Pancras ABC
1929	W. J. Hunt	Polytechnic Boxing Club
1930	Jimmy Waples	Limehouse & Poplar ABC
1931	Dave McCleave	Lynn ABC
1932	Freddie Meachem	Civic Service ABC
1933	Harry Mizler	Oxford & St. George's ABC
1934	Jim Rolland	Leith Victoria ABC
1935	Frank Frost	Lynn & Civil Service ABC
1936	Freddie Simpson	Battersea ABC
1937	Arthur Danahar	Federation of London Men's Institute ABC
1938	Tommy McGrath	Melingriffith ABC
1939	Harry Groves	Devas ABC
1940-42	Not held	
1943	Tommy McGovern	Fitzroy Lodge & Lynn ABC
1944	Billy Thompson	Hickleton Main ABC
1945	Jack Williamson	Manchester YMCA ABC
1946	Eddie Thomas	Merthyr Ex-Servicemen's BC
1947	Colin Morrisey	Tir-y-berth BC
1948	Stoker Ron Cooper	Royal Navy
1949	Algar Smith	Langham ABC
1950	Ronnie Latham	Hickleton Main ABC
1951	Ron Hinson	West Ham ABC
1952	Freddie Reardon	Downham Community ABC
1953	Pte. Dennis Hinson	Army
1954	Pte. George Whelan	Army
1955	Steve Coffey	Manco ABC
1956	Cpl. Dick McTaggart	Royal Air Force
1957	Cpl. Johnny Kidd	Royal Air Force
1958	Cpl. Dick McTaggart	Royal Air Force
1959	Pte. Paul Warwick	Army
1960	Dick McTaggart	Dundee ABC
1961	Paul Warwick	West Ham ABC
1962	Brian Whelan	Chiswick General ABC
1963	Pte. Brendan O'Sullivan	Army
1964	Jimmy Dunne	Maple Leaf ABC
1965	Al White	Stock Exchange ABC
1966	Johnny F. Head	Hampstead ABC
1967	Terry Waller	Lynn ABC
1968	Jim Watt	Cardowan ABC
1969	Howard Hayes	Plant Works ABC
1970	Neville Cole	Fitzroy Lodge ABC
1971	Joey Singleton	Kirkby ABC
1972	Neville Cole	Fitzroy Lodge ABC
1973	Tommy Dunn	Reading ABC
1974	John Lynch	Kensington ABC
1975	Patrick Cowdell	Warley ABC
1976	Sylvester Mittee	Repton ABC
1977	George Gilbody	St. Helens Star ABC
1978	Terry Marsh	Royal Navy
1979	George Gilbody	St. Helens Star ABC
1980	George Gilbody	St. Helens Star ABC
1981	George Gilbody	St. Helens Star ABC
1982	Jim McDonnell	St. Pancras ABC
1983	Kenny Willis	Rotunda ABC
1984	Alex Dickson	Larkhall ABC
1985	Edmond McAuley	Hogarth ABC
1986	Joey Jacobs	Fox ABC
1987	Michael Ayers	All Stars ABC
1988	Charlie Kane	Antonine ABC
1989	Mark Ramsey	Small Heath ABC
1990	Patrick Gallagher	Angel ABC
1991	Paul Ramsey	Small Heath ABC
1992	Dean Amory	Kingshurst ABC
1993	Bradley Welsh	Leith Victoria ABC
1994	Andy Green	Phil Thomas School of Boxing ABC
1995	Roy Rutherford	Bell Green ABC
1996	Ian Walker	Oldham ABC
1997	Mark Hawthorpe	Lowestoft ABC
1998	Andy McLean	Birtley ABC
1999	Stephen Burke	Salisbury ABC
2000	Andy McLean	Birtley ABC
2001	Stephen Burke	Salisbury ABC
2002	Andy Morris	West Wythenshawe ABC
2003	Stephen Burke	Salisbury ABC
2004	Chris Pacey	Army
2005	Gary Sykes	Cleckheaton ABC
2006	Anthony Crolla	Fox ABC
2007	Frankie Gavin	Hall Green ABC
2008	Martin Stead	Army
2009	Martin Stead	Army
2010	Martin Stead	Army
2011	Sam Maxwell	Salisbury ABC
2012	Josh Leather	Wellington ABC
2013	Isaac Dogboe	Territorial Army London
2014	Pat McCormack	Birtley ABC
2015	Luke McCormack	Birtley ABC
2016	Calum French	Birtley ABC
2017	Thomas Hodgson	Birtley ABC
2018	Mark Chamberlain	Team Wiseman
2019	Masood Abdulah	Islington ABC
2020	cancelled due to COVID 19.	
2021	Patris Mughalzai	Powerday Hooks
2022	Giorgio Visioli	Repton
2023	Cameron Vuong	Birtley
2024	Will Hewitt	Leigh
2025	Freddie Pullen	West Ham
2026	Ciaran Knight	Halewood
