= Pat Floyd =

British boxer

Personal information
- Nationality: British (English)
- Born: 27 August 1910 Dalston, England
- Died: 3 July 1988 (aged 77) Watford, England

Sport
- Sport: Boxing
- Event: Heavyweight
- Club: Battersea BC
Medal record
Boxing
Representing England
British Empire Games
Gold medal – first place	1934 London	heavyweight

Hugh Pat Floyd (1910–1988) was an English boxer who competed for England.

== Boxing career ==
Floyd boxed out of the Battersea BC He represented England at the 1934 British Empire Games in London, where he competed in the heavyweight division, winning a gold medal.

Floyd was the Amateur Boxing Association four times heavyweight champion in 1929, 1934, 1935 and 1946. He defeated James Howell of the United States in the New York Golden Gloves tournament during 1935. On 8 December 1935 in the Oslo Colosseum; he fought Erling Nilsen in England's first match against Norway. He represented England in the 1934 European Championships in Budapest.

== Personal life ==
He was a printer by trade and lived at 45 Kerby Street, Battersea in 1935.
