= Andy Green (boxer) =

Retired boxer who competed for England

Personal information
- Nationality: British (English)
- Born: 31 December 1970 (age 55) Middlesbrough, North Yorkshire

Andrew Green (born 1970) is a male retired boxer who competed for England at the commonwealth games.

== Boxing career ==
Green was the National Champion in 1994 after winning the prestigious ABA lightweight title, boxing out of the Phil Thomas School of Boxing ABC.

He represented England in the lightweight (-60 Kg) division, at the 1994 Commonwealth Games in Victoria, British Columbia, Canada.

He turned professional on 22 February 1996 and fought in 9 fights until 1999.
