= Ernest Chandler =

British boxer

Personal information
- Nationality: British
- Born: 31 July 1891; Kennington, London
- Died: 16 August 1936 (aged 45); Brighton, East Sussex

Sport
- Sport: Boxing

Ernest Vivian Chandler (31 July 1891 to 16 August 1936) was a British boxer and cyclist.

== Boxing career ==
Chandler won the 1912 A.B.A. Middleweight Championship boxing for Stock Exchange ABC.

After stepping up in weight he won the 1914 A.B.A. Heavyweight Championship. In 1914, he also became the World Amateur Heavyweight champion.

He died in 1936 from blood poisoning following a blood transfusion.
