= Thomas Perkins (cricketer) =

English cricketer and schoolmaster

Personal information
- Full name: Thomas Tosswill Norwood Perkins
- Born: 19 December 1870; Strood, Kent
- Died: 26 July 1946 (aged 75); Tonbridge, Kent
- Batting: Right-handed
- Bowling: Right-arm fast

Domestic team information
- Years: Team
- 1893–1894: Cambridge University
- 1893–1900: Kent
- 1903–1912: Wiltshire
- FC debut: 8 May 1893 Cambridge University v CI Thornton's XI
- Last FC: 23 August 1900 Kent v Worcestershire

Career statistics
Competition	First-class
Matches	46
Runs scored	1,675
Batting average	23.59
100s/50s	1/11
Top score	109
Balls bowled	350
Wickets	2
Bowling average	99.00
5 wickets in innings	0
10 wickets in match	0
Best bowling	1/15
Catches/stumpings	27/–
- Source: CricInfo, 11 November 2018

Thomas Tosswill Norwood Perkins (19 December 1870 – 26 July 1946) was an English schoolmaster, a cricketer who played first-class cricket for Cambridge University and Kent, and a footballer who captained the university side at Cambridge.

== Early life ==
Perkins was born at Strood in Kent, the son of the Rev Thomas Norwood Perkins, the curate of Strood in 1870, and his wife, the former Emily Louisa Tosswill. He was educated at St John's School, Leatherhead and Jesus College, Cambridge. Before going to Cambridge University in 1891, he was an assistant schoolmaster at Oxford and Great Yarmouth; he was almost 21 when he started at Cambridge.

== Sporting career ==
Perkins won a Blue for association football in all three years he was at Cambridge. He was described in his Wisden obituary as a "powerful soccer player" who played with "dash at centre-forward". He captained the Cambridge side in 1894–95 as Cambridge beat Oxford in the varsity match. He went on to play football for Cornwall, Norfolk and Essex.

Perkins did not appear in the university cricket team until his second year, when he established himself as a right-handed lower or middle-order batsman. In his second first-class match, a 12-a-side game against the Gentlemen of England team, he batted at No 9 and top-scored with an unbeaten 57 in the first Cambridge innings. The 1893 University Match against Oxford University was won easily by Cambridge, and Perkins, batting at No 8, scored 18 and 37. After the university term was over, Perkins played for Kent, and in the game against Nottinghamshire at Trent Bridge he scored 109, which was his only first-class century.

In 1894, Perkins played in most of the university team's first-class games and scored 23 and 24 in the University Match, which was a decisive win for Oxford. From this game, he went on to the Gentlemen v Players match at The Oval, appearing for the Gentlemen side which was captained by W. G. Grace. He played a few more matches for Kent in the second half of the 1894 season and rounded the year off by appearing in the Gentlemen of the South against the Players of the South game at Lord's in mid-September, though in a very strong batting side he came in at No 10.

From 1895, Perkins became a schoolmaster, although he does not appear to have graduated finally from Cambridge University until 1896. He was an assistant master at St Michael's School in Westgate-on-Sea, Kent in 1895, at Felsted School in Essex from 1897 to 1900, where he coached the future England captain J.W.H.T. Douglas, and at Rossall School in Lancashire from 1900 to 1903. He returned to first-class with Kent in a few games at the end of the 1899 season and more regularly in school holidays in 1900: he scored 88 in the match against Lancashire in 1900 and put on 221 for the fifth wicket with Cuthbert Burnup, who made 200. He did not appear in first-class cricket after the 1900 season.

== Later life ==
Perkins was joint headmaster of two preparatory schools in the Bath area from 1904 to 1912 and played in Minor Counties cricket for Wiltshire in that period. He was then headmaster of Larchfield School at Helensburgh, Dunbartonshire, Scotland from 1915 to 1932 when he retired to Kent; among his teachers at Larchfield were the poets Cecil Day-Lewis and W. H. Auden. He died at Tonbridge in Kent in 1946 aged 75.
