= William Child (boxer) =

British boxer

Personal information
- Nationality: British
- Born: 7 August 1884; Norwich, Norfolk
- Died: First quarter 1961 (aged 76); Cambridge, Cambridgeshire

Sport
- Sport: Boxing

William Child (7 August 1884 – 1961) was a British boxer. He competed in the men's middleweight event at the 1908 Summer Olympics.

Child won the Amateur Boxing Association 1908, 1909 and 1911 middleweight title, when boxing out of the Canbridge ABC.

After retiring from boxing he became a University boxing and fencing coach at Cambridge.
