= William J. Dees =

English boxer

William Dees
Personal information
- Full name: William John Dees
- Nationality: British (English)
- Born: 28 September 1874 Liverpool, England
- Died: 18 October 1940 (aged 66) London, England

Sport
- Sport: boxing

William John Dees (28 September 1874 – 18 October 1940) was a boxer from England. He won the Amateur Boxing Association of England's middleweight championship in 1897, and was the heavyweight champion in 1900. He represented Great Britain at the 1908 Olympic Games in London in 1908. In 1935, as president of the Amateur Boxing Association, he sailed from Southampton to New York with the Golden Gloves Boxing Association. In October 1940, during the Blitz, Dees was killed by bombs in his home in Deptford, south London, aged 66.
