= England Boxing National Amateur Championships Heavyweight Champions =

English Boxing competition

England Boxing National Amateur Championships Heavyweight Champions (U90kg)
- Status: active
- Genre: Boxing
- Inaugurated: 1881
- Organiser: England Boxing

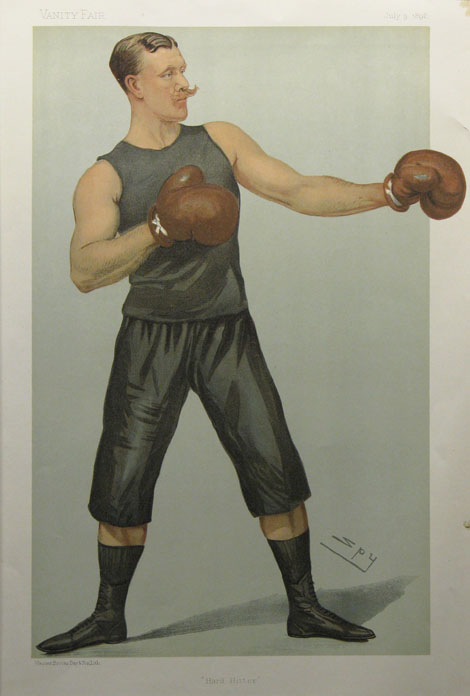
Walter Edgeworth-Johnstone 1895 and 1896 champion

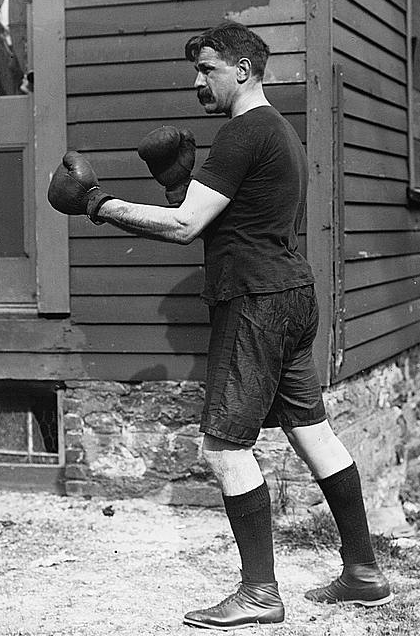
Frank Parks 1899, 1901, 1902, 1905 and 1906 champion

The England Boxing National Amateur Championships Heavyweight Championship formerly known as the ABA Championships is the primary English amateur boxing championship. It had previously been contested by all the nations of the United Kingdom.

== History ==
The heavyweight division is the newest division only being inaugurated in 1998 and is currently contested in the under-90 Kg weight division. The championships are highly regarded in the boxing world and seen as the most prestigious national amateur championships.

== Past winners ==
Year	Winner	Club
1881	Robert Frost-Smith+	Clapton ABC
1882	Henry Thomas Dearsley	St. James ABC
1883	Henry Thomas Dearsley	Thames ABC
1884	Henry Thomas Dearsley	St. James ABC
1885	William West	Northampton ABC
1886	Anthony Diamond	Birmingham ABC
1887	Edward White	Belle Sauvage AAC
1888	Bill J King	Belsize ABC
1889	Alfred Bowman	Royal Victor ABC
1890	Joe Steers	London ABC
1891	Val Barker	Belsize ABC
1892	Joe Steers	Middleton ABC
1893	Joe Steers	Middleton ABC
1894	Horace King	Belsize ABC
1895	Walter Edgeworth-Johnstone	Royal Irish Regiment
1896	Walter Edgeworth-Johnstone	Royal Irish Regiment
1897	Geoff Townsend	Goldsmith Institute ABC
1898	Geoff Townsend	Goldsmith Institute ABC
1899	Frank Parks	Polytechnic ABC
1900	William J. Dees	Goldsmith Institute ABC
1901	Frank Parks	Polytechnic ABC
1902	Frank Parks	Polytechnic ABC
1903	Edward Dickson	Edinburgh Harriers GC
1904	Archibald Herbert Horner	Belsize ABC
1905	Frank Parks	Polytechnic ABC
1906	Frank Parks	Polytechnic ABC
1907	Bert Brewer	Polytechnic ABC
1908	Syd Evans	Reading ABC
1909	C. Brown	Victoria B & Ath C
1910	Fred Storbeck	South Africa
1911	Bill Hazell	City Police ABC
1912	Dick Smith	Metropolitan Police ABC
1913	Dick Smith	Metropolitan Police ABC
1914	Ernest Chandler	Stock Exchange ABC
1915–1918	Not held due to World War I	
1919	Hugh Brown	Belsize ABC
1920	Ronald Rawson	Polytechnic ABC
1921	Ronald Rawson	Polytechnic ABC
1922	Tom Evans	Amman Valley ABC
1923	Eddie Eagan	Oxford University ABC
1924	Arthur Clifton	PLA Police ABC
1925	Lieut Dudley Lister (MC)	I.S.B.A
1926	Thyge Petersen	Denmark
1927	Lieut Charles Francis Capper	Royal Artillery
1928	James O'Driscoll	Dublin Civic Guards ABC
1929	Pat Floyd	Battersea ABC
1930	Sig. Anthony Stuart	Royal Corps of Signals
1931	Matt Flanagan	Dublin Civic Guards ABC
1932	Anthony Stuart	London Fire Brigade ABC
1933	Con O'Grady	London City Police ABC
1934	Pat Floyd	Battersea & The Times ABC
1935	Pat Floyd	Battersea & The Times ABC
1936	Anthony Stuart	London Fire Brigade ABC
1937	Anthony Stuart	London Fire Brigade ABC
1938	George Preston	Battersea ABC
1939	Jock Porter	Colchester City ABC
1940–1942	Not held due to World War II	
1943	George Preston	Battersea ABC
1944	Mark Hart	Royal Air Force
1945	George Scott	Nottingham City Police & APTC ABC
1946	Pat Floyd	Polytechnic ABC
1947	George Scriven	Downham Community ABC
1948	Sgt. Jack Gardner	Army
1949	LCpl Anthony Worrall	Army
1950	Pte. Peter Toch	Army
1951	Albert Halsey	Kyrle Hall ABC
1952	Eddie Hearn	Battersea ABC
1953	Pte. Joe Erskine	Army
1954	Cpl. Brian Harper	Royal Air Force
1955	Dennis Rowe	Glamorgan Police
1956	Dave Rent	Maple Leaf ABC
1957	Dave Thomas	Polytechnic ABC
1958	Dave Thomas	Polytechnic ABC
1959	Dave Thomas	Polytechnic ABC
1960	L/Sgt. Len Hobbs	Army
1961	Billy Walker	West Ham ABC
1962	Rae Dryden	Royal Navy
1963	Cpl. Robert Sanders	Royal Navy
1964	Colin Woodhouse	Wandsworth ABC
1965	William Wells	Wandsworth ABC
1966	Anthony Brogan	Barnstaple ABC
1967	Peter Boddington	Rootes ABC
1968	William Wells	Lynn ABC
1969	Alan Burton	Caius ABC
1970	Jim Gilmour	Sighthill ABC
1971	Les Stevens	Reading ABC
1972	Tim Wood	Belgrave ABC
1973	Garfield McEwan	Kyrle Hall ABC
1974	Neville Meade	Royal Air Force
1975	Gregory McEwan	Rum Runners ABC
1976	John Rafferty	Monkland ABC
1977	Glenn Adair	Barnstaple ABC
1978	Julius Awome	Working ABC
1979	Andy Palmer	Golden Gloves ABC
1980	Frank Bruno	Sir Phillip Game ABC
1981	Adrian Elliott	Fairburn House ABC
1982	Harold Hylton	Brockworth Viking ABC
1983	Horace Notice	Nechells ABC
1984	Doug Young	Hawick ABC
1985	Harold Hylton	Viking ABC
1986	Eric Cardouza	Kingsthorpe ABC
1987	James Moran	Austin ABC
1988	Henry Akinwande	Lynn ABC
1989	Henry Akinwande	Lynn ABC
1990	Keith Inglis	Tunbridge Wells ABC
1991	Paul Lawson	Repton ABC
1992	Scott Welch	Hove ABC
1993	Paul Lawson	Repton ABC
1994	Steve Burford	Army
1995	Mathew Ellis	Blackpool ABC
1996	Anthony Oakley	Leigh Park ABC
1997	Blue Stevens	Pinehurst Star ABC
1998	Neil Hoskins	Royal Air Force
1999	Stuart St. John	Berry Boys ABC
2000	David Dolan	Plains Farm ABC
2001	David Dolan	Plains Farm ABC
2002	David Dolan	Plains Farm ABC
2003	Mick O'Connell	Royal Navy
2004	Tony Bellew	Rotunda ABC
2005	Tony Bellew	Rotunda ABC
2006	Tony Bellew	Rotunda ABC
2007	Danny Price	Westway ABC
2008	Warren Baister	Sunderland ABC
2009	Chris Keane	Pleck ABC
2010	Danny Price	Scarborough ABC
2011	Ben Ileyemi	Finchley ABC
2012	Simon Barclay	Corby ABC
2013	Greg Bridet	Heart of Portsmouth ABC
2014	Warren Baister	Sunderland ABC
2015	Ricardo Slue	Fitzroy Lodge ABC
2016	Cheavon Clarke	Gravesham ABC
2017	Cheavon Clarke	Gravesham ABC
2018	Lewis Williams	Cleary's ABC
2019	Natty Ngwenya	Army
2020	cancelled due to COVID 19.	
2021	Patrick Brown	Moss Side Fire
2022	Patrick Brown	Moss Side Fire
2023	Damar Thomas	Powerday Hooks
2024	Chidi Amanwa	Britania
2025	Akinloa Tijnai	Clifton
2026	Adekali Kargbo	De Hood

+ Reported as Richard Frost-Smith on England Boxing website but believed to be Robert Frost-Smith.
