= Sidney Evans (boxer) =

British boxer

Medal record

Men's boxing

Representing Great Britain

Olympic Games
Silver medal – second place	1908 London	Heavyweight

Sidney Clifton Horace Evans (1881 – 8 January 1927) was a British heavyweight boxer who competed in the early twentieth century. He won a silver medal in Boxing at the 1908 Summer Olympics. Evans was born in Aldermaston in West Berkshire.
