= Fred Brooman =

British civil servant

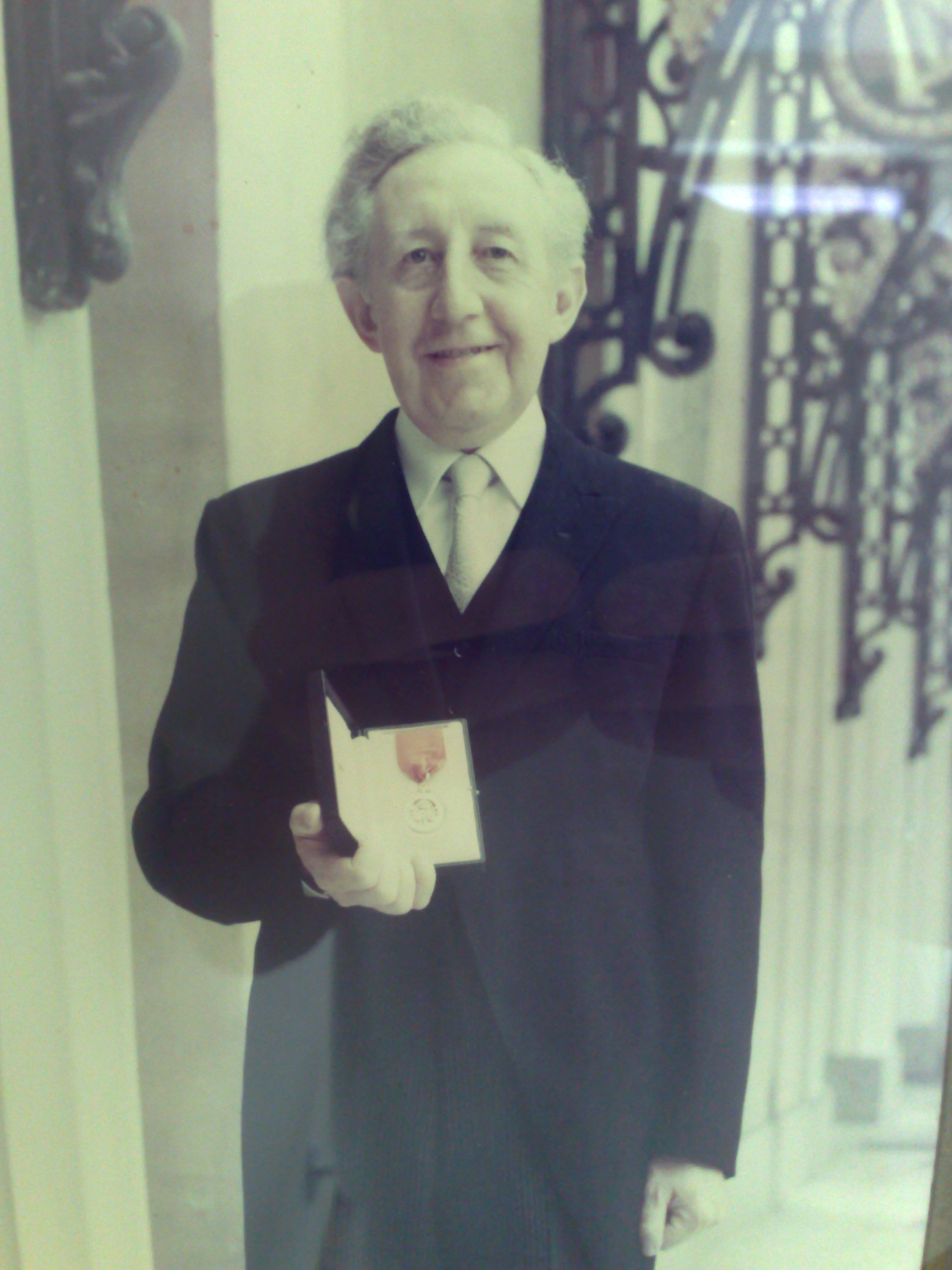
Fred Brooman

Frederick Howard Brooman CB (3 May 1919 – 8 June 2007) was a British accountant and civil servant.

== Careers ==
=== World War II ===
Brooman was called up and served in the Royal West Kent Regiment and, after the Dunkirk Evacuation, in the REME in World War II, working on many artillery weapons, a period when he met his wife.

=== Civil servant career ===
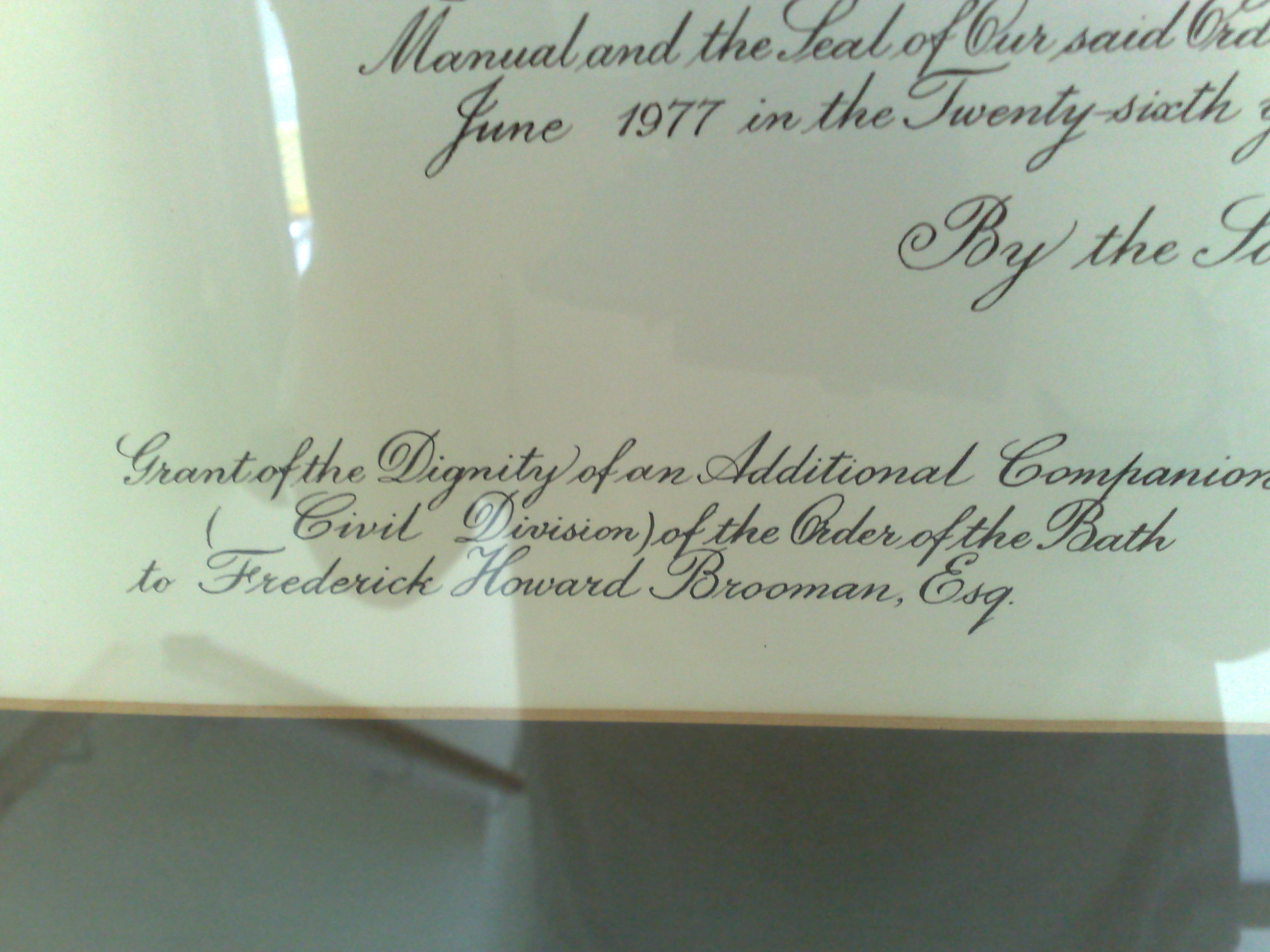
Photo of the page presented to Fred Brooman CB by the Order of the Bath's Grand Master.

Brooman became Accountant and Comptroller General to the Board of the Inland Revenue on 1 August 1968. At the time of his retirement, he was the head of personnel for the Inland Revenue, for which he was awarded a CB on 26 June 1977.

=== Voluntary sector accountant ===
After the war, Brooman became involved in the United Reformed Church, and using his knowledge of accounting picked up as working for the Inland Revenue he became the church's accountant. Through hard work, he became the district and then the country Treasurer for the United Reformed Church.

== Personal life ==
In 1950, his first child was born and three years later his second. Fred Brooman in later life lived in Weybridge, Surrey. His hobbies included walking, especially scenic mountain hikes, Contract Bridge, jigsaws and anything mechanical.
