= George Gilbody =

British boxer (1955–2025)

Personal information
- Nationality: British
- Born: 1 January 1955 Southport, England
- Died: 31 October 2025 (aged 70) Warrington, England

Sport
- Sport: Boxing

George Gilbody (1 January 1955 – 31 October 2025) was a British boxer. He captained the British boxing team in the men's lightweight event at the 1980 Summer Olympics.

Gilbody was the National Champion in 1974 after winning the prestigious ABA featherweight title, he was also a four times National Champion in the lightweight division (1977, 1979, 1980, 1981) boxing out of St. Helens Star ABC. He also represented England in the 60 kg lightweight division at the 1978 Commonwealth Games in Edmonton, Alberta, Canada.

Gilbody died on 31 October 2025, at the age of 70.
