= Johnny Douglas =

English cricketer (1882–1930)

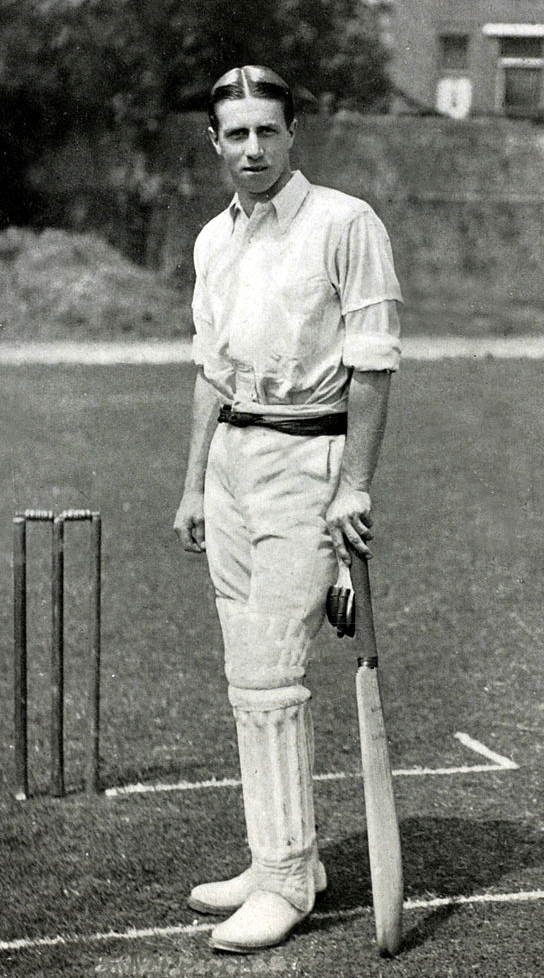
- Douglas c. 1906

Personal information
- Full name: John William Henry Tyler Douglas
- Born: 3 September 1882; Stoke Newington, London, England
- Died: 19 December 1930 (aged 48) at sea, seven miles south of the Læsø Trindel Lightship, Denmark
- Batting: Right-handed
- Bowling: Right arm fast-medium

International information
- National side: England
- Test debut (cap 170): 15 December 1911 v Australia
- Last Test: 8 January 1925 v Australia

Domestic team information
- Years: Team
- 1901–1928: Essex
- 1903–1904: London County

Career statistics
Competition	Tests	First-class
Matches	23	651
Runs scored	962	24,531
Batting average	29.15	27.90
100s/50s	1/6	26/107
Top score	119	210*
Balls bowled	2,812	83,528
Wickets	45	1,893
Bowling average	33.02	23.32
5 wickets in innings	1	113
10 wickets in match	0	23
Best bowling	5/46	9/47
Catches/stumpings	9/–	365/–
- Source: Cricinfo, 11 November 2008

Johnny Douglas
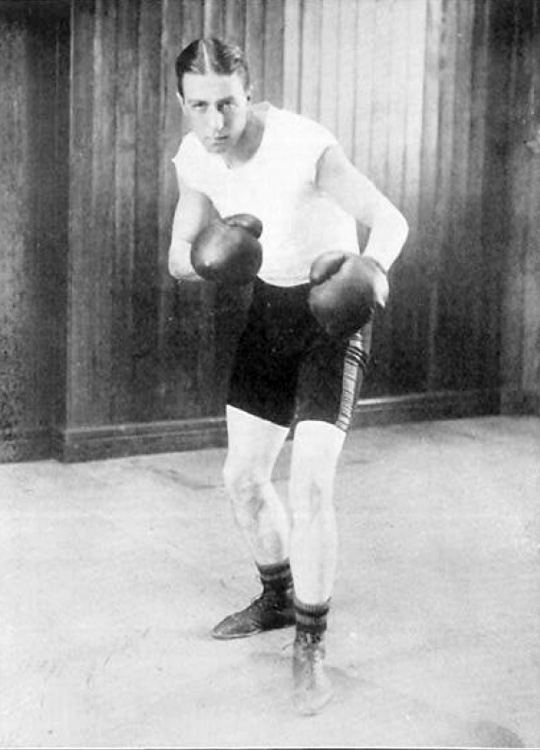
- Douglas as a boxer at the 1908 Olympics

Sport
- Sport: Boxing
- Club: Belsize BC, Hampstead
Medal record
Representing Great Britain
Olympic Games
Gold medal – first place	1908 London	-71.7 kg

John William Henry Tyler Douglas (3 September 1882 – 19 December 1930) was an English cricketer who was active in the early decades of the twentieth century. Douglas was an all-rounder who played for Essex County Cricket Club from 1901 to 1928 and captained the county from 1911 to 1928. He also played for England and captained England both before and after the First World War with markedly different success. As well as playing cricket, Douglas was a notable amateur boxer who won the middleweight gold medal at the 1908 Olympic Games.

== Early life ==
Douglas was the son of successful timber merchant John Herbert Douglas (1853–1930) and Julia Ann (née Tyler) and was born at Stoke Newington, London in what is now Belfast Road. He was educated at Moulton Grammar School and Felsted School, where at school he was coached by the former first-class player T.N. Perkins, and joined his father's wood-importing firm, which supported his amateur status in cricket and boxing. Douglas also played football once for the England amateur side (occasion unknown, through loss of records). He served in the Bedfordshire Regiment throughout World War I, eventually as major (acting lieutenant-colonel).

== Boxing career ==
Douglas took up boxing while still a schoolboy, and won the Amateur Boxing Association 1905 middleweight title when boxing out of the Belsize ABC.

In 1908, Douglas won an Olympic gold medal as a middleweight boxer. All three of his bouts, including the final, described by The Times as "one of the most brilliant exhibitions of skilful boxing, allied to tremendous hitting, ever seen.", were held on the same day. The silver medal winner, Snowy Baker, 44 years later falsely claimed that Douglas's father was the sole judge and referee.

Baker never publicly contested the close points verdict which Douglas, who scored a second-round knockdown over him and won in their Olympic final. Yet, in a 1952 interview, he claimed that Douglas's father had refereed the fight, leading to widespread suspicion of a dodgy decision. In reality, Douglas Senior was at ringside to present the medals in his role as president of the Amateur Boxing Association of England (ABA). The real referee was Eugene Corri, who did not have to give a casting vote as the two judges agreed that Douglas was a narrow winner. Douglas Jr, his father and his younger brother, Cecil ('Pickles') were all prominent referees and officials in the ABA, the last also being the leading referee in the professional sport in the 1930s. Besides his Olympic gold, Douglas also won the 1905 ABA middleweight title.

=== Olympic results ===
- Defeated René Doudelle (France) KO round 1
- 2nd round bye
- Defeated Ruben Warnes (Great Britain) KO round 2
- Defeated Snowy Baker (Australia) Decision

== Cricket career ==
Douglas was an untiring fast-medium bowler and obdurate batsman who was nicknamed with a play on his initials JWHT as "Johnny Will Hit Today" or conversely "Johnny Won't Hit Today" by Australian hecklers. He captained the school teams at Felsted and was a member of Wanstead C.C. He made his Essex debut at the age of eighteen against Yorkshire and bagged a pair, with George Hirst dismissing him in both innings. He played in only two more matches that season and, in the 1902 season, did not appear at all in first-class cricket while working incessantly on his game in practice. He regained his place at Essex in the 1903 season, playing eleven matches "but was still anything but a good player". The improvements in his game continued, and by 1905 he had become a strong county bowler, finishing top of the Essex bowling averages with 31 wickets at an average of just above 26, and taking the first of his three first-class hat-tricks, against Yorkshire at Leyton. In 1908, he passed 1000 runs in a season for the first time. He had matured into a leading all-rounder who took over the captaincy of Essex in 1911, a captaincy which he retained until 1928. He was unhappy about being removed from the captaincy, saying, "The fact that I did not resign, but was kicked out of the captaincy, has created a delicate situation." He also complained that some of his players had not shown the loyalty he was due, on and off the field.

He played for England before and after the First World War. Douglas was named as a Wisden Cricketer of the Year in 1915, but play was suspended during the war years. After the war, until 1923, he had to carry Essex's bowling on his shoulders except when George Louden turned out. He took over 100 wickets in a season seven times, with a best of 147 in 1920. The following year against Derbyshire, he produced perhaps the most remarkable all-round performance in English first-class cricket history. After taking nine for 47, Douglas stopped a breakdown against Bill Bestwick with an unbeaten 210 that tired him so much he did not bowl until the end of Derbyshire's second innings. He then took two for none, giving him a match record of eleven for 47.

Douglas captained England eighteen times, with a Test match record of won eight, lost eight, drawn two. Successful as stand-in captain in Australia in 1911, he won the series 4–1. On the 1920/21 tour of Australia, he led a depleted post-war side that suffered a 0–5 'whitewash', a scoreline not repeated in an Ashes series until the 2006/7 England team lost by the same margin. Reappointed reluctantly by the M.C.C. in 1921, he lost the first two Tests at home to Warwick Armstrong's side and was displaced as captain but retained in the XI. He captained England in one further Test match, against South Africa in July 1924, and played his final Test on the 1924/25 England tour of Australia.

== Later life ==
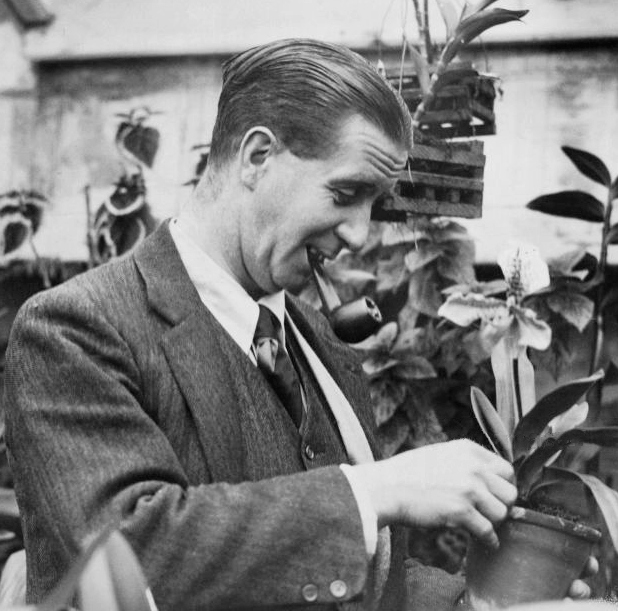
Douglas with his orchids at home in Theydon Bois, Essex, 1926

Douglas married Evelyn Ruby (sister of two of his close wartime friends), the widow of Captain Thomas Elphinstone Case, of the Coldstream Guards, daughter of Adolphus Ferguson and Minnie Byron, on 25 December 1916. He had no children but one stepson, the actor Gerald Case.

Douglas drowned when the Finnish passenger ship Oberon, on which he and his father were sailing back to Britain after buying timber in Finland, sank in the Kattegat seven miles south of the Læsø Trindel Lightship, Denmark. Another ship of the same line, Arcturus, had rammed her in fog after the two captains, who were brothers, had tried to exchange Christmas greetings. According to a witness at the post mortem enquiry, Douglas may have been trying to save his father. He was aged 48.

== Bibliography ==
- Bray, Charles (1950). Essex County Cricket. London: Convoy Publications Ltd.
- Lemmon, David (1983). Johnny Won't Hit Today – A Cricketing Biography of J. W. H. T. Douglas. London: George Allen & Unwin. ISBN 0047960760.
- Wilson, RM (1956). The Big Ships. London: Cassell & Co. pp. 220, 221.

Sporting positions
Preceded by "Shrimp" Leveson Gower	English national cricket captain 1911/2	Succeeded by CB Fry
Preceded by CB Fry	English national cricket captain 1913/4-1920/1	Succeeded by Honourable Lionel Tennyson
