= Reuben Charles Warnes =

English boxer

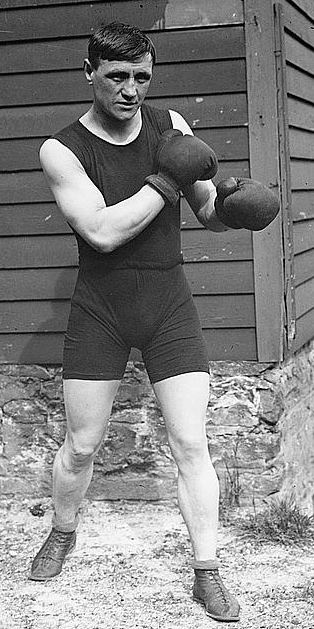
- Born: 12 November 1875; Rotherhithe; Greater London
- Died: 16 January 1961 (aged 85); Hornchurch; Greater London

Reuben Charles Warnes (12 October 1875 – 16 January 1961) was a boxing middleweight champion who participated in the 1908 Summer Olympics. He lost the Olympic bout to Johnny Douglas. He was a member of the Gainsford Amateur Boxing Club.

== Biography ==
He was born on 12 October 1875 in Rotherhithe in Greater London to Reuben Warnes and Harriet Emma Hockley. Warnes married Amelia Maria Christopher on 15 February 1903 in Southwark.

He boxed in the 1908 Summer Olympics, losing to Johnny Douglas.

In 1911, he and Frank Parks went to the United States with the Amateur Boxing Association of England to fight in Madison Square Garden in an international series of bouts.

He died on 16 January 1961 in Hornchurch in Greater London.

== Championships ==
He won the Amateur Boxing Association of England middleweight championships in 1899, 1901, 1903, 1907, and 1910.

In 1936, he was a Boxing Official at the Olympic games, receiving an Official's medal from Adolf Hitler.

He was later posthumously awarded an Olympic Bronze medal from the 1908 Olympic Games when the rules were changed to allow 4th place to gain a bronze medal.

== Gallery ==
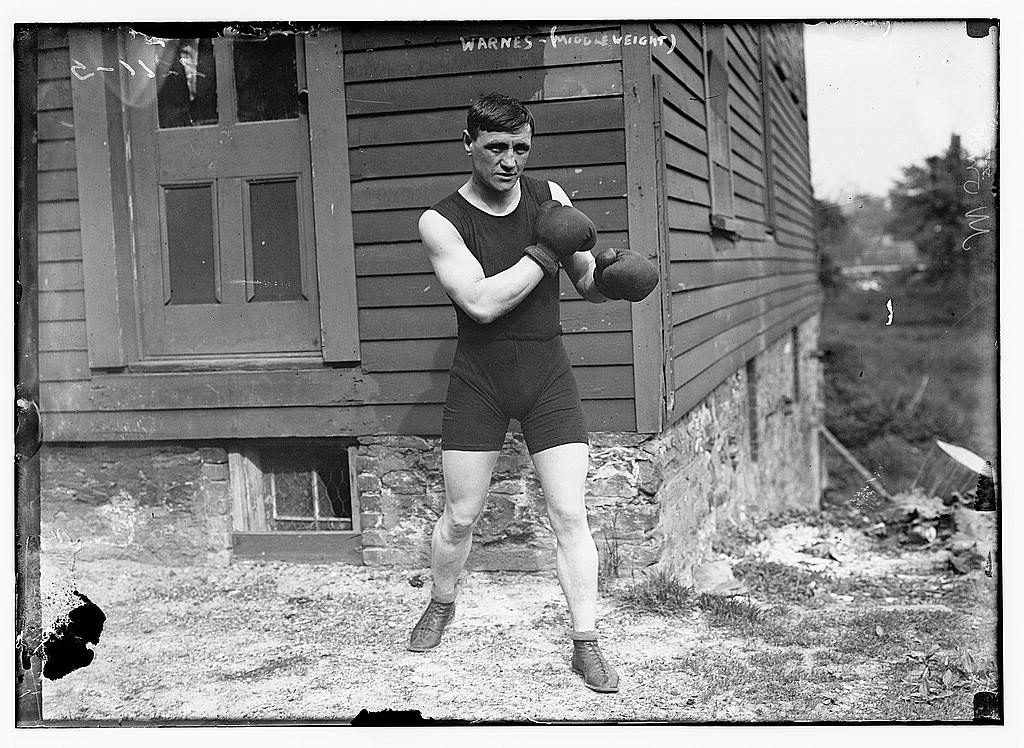
Warnes on 13 May 1911

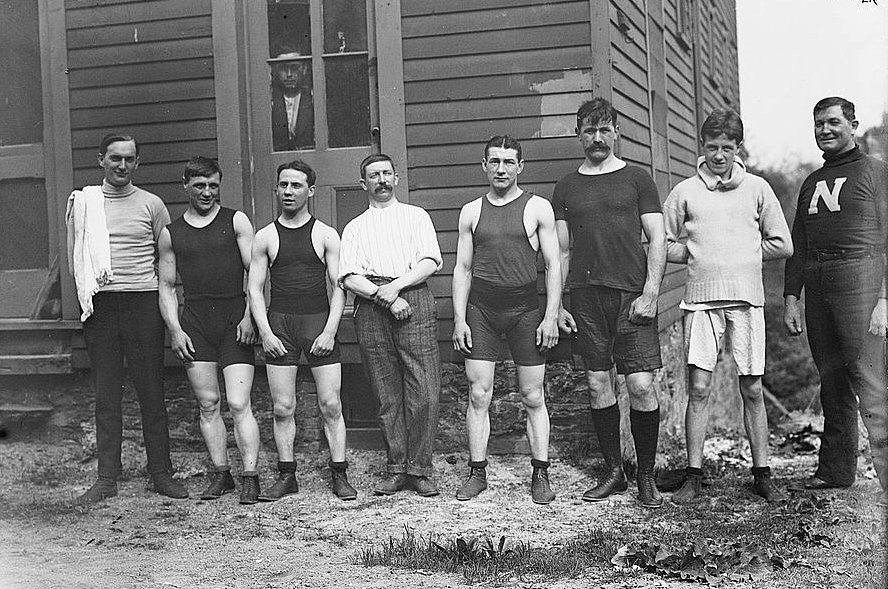
From left to right are: Hayes the trainer; Reuben Charles Warnes; W. W. Allen; secretary Edward T. Calver of the ABA; Alfred Spenceley; Frank Parks; Erskine; and Murray the trainer on 13 May 1911
