= England Boxing =

Boxing association

- Sport: Amateur boxing
- Founded: 1880
- Affiliation: World Boxing

Official website
- www.englandboxing.org
- (England)

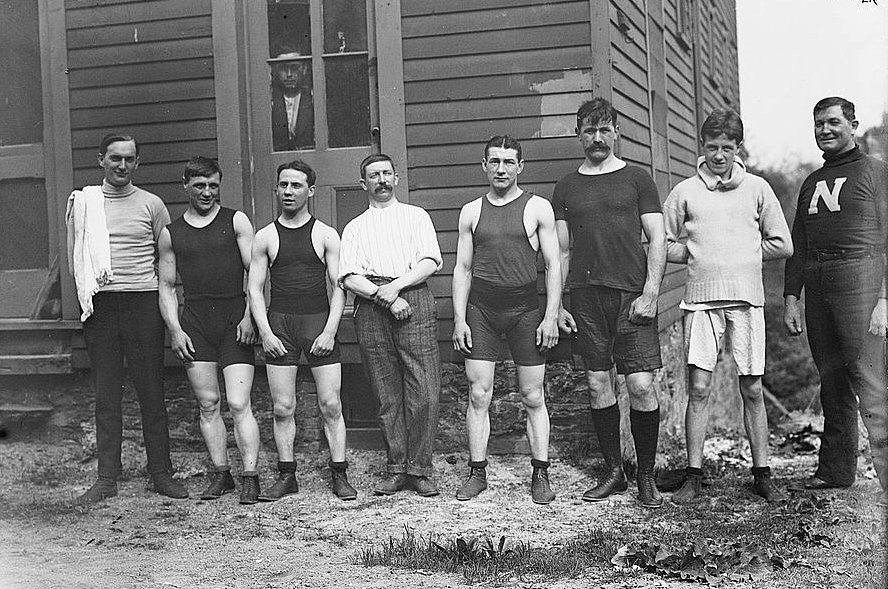
From left to right are: Hayes the trainer; Reuben Charles Warnes; W. W. Allen; secretary E. T. Calver of the Amateur Boxing Association of England; Alfred Spenceley; Frank Parks; Erskine; and Murray the trainer on May 13, 1911, in the United States on a tour of exhibition matches

England Boxing, known until 2013 as the Amateur Boxing Association of England, is the leading governing body of amateur boxing clubs in England. There are separate organisations for Scotland and Wales with boxing in Northern Ireland being organised on an All-Ireland basis. The Association was founded in 1880.

== Regions ==
- Army
- East Midlands
- Eastern Counties
- Home Counties which is made up of Oxfordshire, Berkshire, Buckinghamshire, Bedfordshire and Hertfordshire.
- London Boxing, established 2016
- Merseyside & Cheshire
- Midlands
- Northwest
- Police
- RAF
- Royal Navy
- Southern Counties which is made up of Kent, Sussex, Hampshire and Surrey. The Kent Amateur Boxing Association was established in 1948 at the Royal Star Hotel, Maidstone. There were originally 16 founding clubs

== Championships ==
In 1881, it organised the first ABA Championships the following year. From 2008 the Championships were known as the ABAE National Championships and then from 2014 until 2018 they were known as the England Boxing National Elite Championships. Another name change followed in 2019 which is the current name, known as the England Boxing National Amateur Championships.

== Lists of England Boxing National Amateur Championships Champions ==
- Light-Flyweight
- Flyweight
- Bantamweight
- Featherweight
- Lightweight
- Light-Welterweight
- Welterweight
- Light-Middleweight
- Middleweight
- Light-Heavyweight
- Cruiserweight
- Heavyweight
- Super-Heavyweight
