= Deaths in November 2006 =

The following is a list of notable deaths in November 2006.

Entries for each day are listed alphabetically by surname. A typical entry lists information in the following sequence:

- Name, age, country of citizenship at birth, subsequent country of citizenship (if applicable), reason for notability, cause of death (if known), and reference.

== November 2006 ==
=== 1 ===
- Bettye Ackerman, 82, American actress (Ben Casey, Bracken's World, Rascal), stroke.
- Archie Allen, 93, American baseball player and coach.
- Daniel Garcia, 80, Mexican professional wrestler and actor better known as Huracán Ramírez, heart attack.
- Buddy Killen, 73, American record producer, founder of Dial Records, pancreatic cancer.
- Florence Klotz, 86, American Tony Award-winning costume designer, heart failure.
- Kurt Martin, 83, Finnish footballer and Olympian (1952).
- Johnny Schofield, 75, British footballer for Birmingham City, former manager of Atherstone Town, complications from an illness.
- Adrienne Shelly, 40, American actress (Trust, Unbelievable Truth) and film director (Waitress), strangled.
- Frits Smol, 82, Dutch water polo player and Olympian (1948, 1952).
- William Styron, 81, American writer (Darkness Visible, Confessions of Nat Turner, Sophie's Choice), pneumonia.
- Hilda van Stockum, 98, Dutch Newbery Medal-winning author of children's books, stroke.
- Silvio Varviso, 82, Swiss conductor of the Vlaamse Opera, illness.

=== 2 ===
- Sam Agee, 91, American football player (Chicago Cardinals).
- Rafael Donato, 69, Filipino President of DLSU-Manila (1991–1994), President of De La Salle Lipa (1995–2003), drowned.
- Adrien Douady, 71, French mathematician.
- Hadyn Ellis, 61, Welsh psychologist.
- Wally Foreman, 58, Australian sports commentator, heart attack.
- Red Hayworth, 91, American baseball player (St. Louis Browns).
- Carroll Knicely, 77, American publisher, Commerce Secretary for three Kentucky governors.
- Henning Kristiansen, 79, Danish cinematographer and film director (Babette's Feast, Me and Charly).
- Matt Leanderson, 75, American rower and Olympian (1952).
- Luigi Luxardo, 92, Italian Olympic rower (1936).
- Leonard Schrader, 62, American screenwriter (Kiss of the Spider Woman, Mishima), heart failure.
- Tommy Stewart, 71, Northern Irish footballer.
- Gyula Tóth, 60, Hungarian Olympic long-distance runner (1968, 1972).
- Derek Turnbull, 79, New Zealand runner.
- Milly Vitale, 73, Italian actress, natural causes.
- Joe Watson, 81, American football player (Rice Owls, Detroit Lions).

=== 3 ===
- Belden Bly, 92, American legislator in the Massachusetts House (1948–1979).
- Frank Dunham Jr., 64, American federal public defender, head lawyer for Zacarias Moussaoui, brain cancer.
- Sir Allen Fairhall, 96, Australian member of the House of Representatives (1949–1969), Minister for Defence (1966–1969).
- Fereydoon Hoveyda, 82, Syrian-born Iranian ambassador to the United Nations (1971–1979), cancer.
- Paul Mauriat, 81, French musician (L'Amour Est Bleu).
- Sputnik Monroe, 77, American professional wrestler, respiratory illness.
- Malachi Ritscher, 52, American anti-war protester, self-immolation.
- Marie Rudisill, 95, American "Fruitcake Lady" on The Tonight Show, aunt of Truman Capote, natural causes.
- Stanley Rothenberg, 76, American lawyer, former president of Copyright Society, complications of popliteal aneurysm surgery.
- Alberto Spencer, 68, Ecuadorian footballer (Peñarol, Ecuador), highest scorer in Copa Libertadores, infection after heart surgery.

=== 4 ===
- Dajan Ahmet, 44, Estonian actor, car accident.
- Brebis Bleaney, 91, British physicist.
- Nelson S. Bond, 97, American writer.
- William Lee Brent, 75, American Black Panther who hijacked a plane to Cuba, bronchial pneumonia.
- Lionel Bryer, 78, South African dentist who founded the Aberdeen International Youth Festival.
- Frank Calder, 91, Canadian aboriginal politician.
- Ernestine Gilbreth Carey, 98, American co-author of Cheaper by the Dozen, natural causes.
- Sergi López, 39, Spanish footballer for FC Barcelona, brother of Gerard López, suicide by train.
- John McManners, 89, British historian, Regius Professor of Ecclesiastical History at Oxford University (1972–1984).
- Helen Westerman, 80, American baseball player.

=== 5 ===
- Louis William Conradt Jr., 56, assistant district attorney in the Dallas–Fort Worth metroplex, suicide.
- Samuel Bowers, 82, American former Imperial Wizard of the Ku Klux Klan, convicted over murder of Vernon Dahmer, cardiac arrest.
- Chen Ding-nan, 63, Taiwanese Justice Minister (2000–2005), lung cancer.
- Chuck DeShane, 87, American football player (Detroit Lions).
- Bülent Ecevit, 81, Turkish former Prime Minister, complications following a stroke.
- George Esser, 85, American civil rights advocate, set up the North Carolina Fund.
- Oscar González, 82, Uruguayan Grand Prix driver.
- André Grosjean, 85, Swiss Olympic water polo player (1948).
- Frank Marsden, 83, British Labour MP (1971–1974).
- Pietro Rava, 90, Italian former football player, last surviving member of the 1938 World Cup-winning team and Olympian (1936), Alzheimer's disease.
- Ham Richardson, 73, American tennis player, US Open doubles winner, diabetes complications.
- Francis Schuckardt, 69, American Traditional Catholic Bishop, rejected decrees of Second Vatican Council, throat cancer.
- Bobby Shearer, 74, Scottish former footballer (Hamilton Academical, Rangers), illness.
- Aleksey Voropayev, 33, Russian gymnast and Olympian (1992, 1996).

=== 6 ===
- Felix Erbert, 88, Czech Olympic swimmer (1936).
- George Gardner, 64, Canadian ice hockey player (Detroit Red Wings, Vancouver Canucks).
- Federico López, 44, Puerto Rican basketball player in two Olympic Games and three world championships (1988, 1992), heart attack.
- Miguel Aceves Mejía, 90, Mexican singer and actor known as "the king of the falsetto", bronchitis.
- Francisco Fernández Ochoa, 56, Spanish alpine skier, and Olympian (1968, 1972, 1976, 1980), cancer.
- Valentin Muratov, 78, Soviet Russian gymnast and Olympian (1952, 1956).
- J. T. Rutherford, 85, American Democratic Representative for Texas (1955–1963), complications from Alzheimer's disease.
- Cyril Stevenson, 92, Bahamian politician and newspaper publisher.

=== 7 ===
- Paul Baltes, 67, German developmental psychologist, cancer.
- Lyudmila Buldakova, 68, Soviet Russian volleyball player and Olympian (1964, 1968, 1972).
- John Coburn, 81, Australian artist, winner of the 1960 and 1977 Blake Prize.
- Richard Erwin, 83, American district judge (United States District Court for the Middle District of North Carolina).
- Buddy Kerr, 84, American baseball player (New York Giants, Boston Braves).
- Leo Linkovesi, 59, Finnish speed skater and Olympian (1972).
- Jackie Parker, 74, American football player (Edmonton Eskimos, Toronto Argonauts, BC Lions), throat cancer.
- Bryan Pata, 22, American football player (Miami Hurricanes), shot.
- Johnny Sain, 89, American baseball player (Boston Braves, New York Yankees) and coach (Chicago White Sox), complications from a stroke.
- Jean-Jacques Servan-Schreiber, 82, French journalist and politician, complications from bronchitis.
- Brian Harold Thomson, 87, British businessman, chairman of D.C. Thomson & Co. Ltd.
- Polly Umrigar, 80, Indian cricketer, lymphoma.
- Tad Weed, 73, American football player (Ohio State Buckeyes, Pittsburgh Steelers).

=== 8 ===
- Rhodes Fairbridge, 92, Australian geologist at Columbia University and expert on climate change, brain tumour.
- Neil Milward Forster, 79, British field hockey player and Olympian (1956).
- Sir James Hunt, 63, British judge in the Queen's Bench Division of the High Court of Justice, brain tumour.
- Takeshi Kozai, 32, Japanese judoka.
- Lia Looveer, 86, Estonian-born Australian politician.
- Basil Poledouris, 61, American film composer (Conan the Barbarian, RoboCop, Starship Troopers), cancer.
- Annette Rogers, 93, American athlete, and Olympian (1932, 1936), stroke.

=== 9 ===
- Jimmie Armstead, 87, American baseball player.
- Ed Bradley, 65, American journalist (60 Minutes), leukemia.
- Garton del Savio, 92, American baseball player (Philadelphia Phillies).
- Mary Grizzle, 85, American politician.
- Ingrid Hartmann, 76, German canoeist and Olympian (1960).
- Pauls Kaņeps, 94, Latvian Olympic cross-country skier (1936).
- Marian Marsh, 93, American actress (Hell's Angels, Svengali), respiratory arrest.
- Dave Rooney, 69, Canadian politician, member of the House of Commons of Canada (1972-1984).
- Mikhail Semyonov, 73, Soviet Russian basketball player and Olympian (1956, 1960).
- Daniel B. Sparr, 75, American district judge (United States District Court for the District of Colorado).
- Sam Stephenson, 72, Irish architect, designed the Central Bank and Wood Quay, complications from heart surgery.
- Ellen Willis, 64, American journalist, professor, feminist activist and critic, lung cancer.
- Markus Wolf, 83, German former head of East Germany's secret intelligence service, natural causes.
- Igor Zaseda, 74, Soviet Ukrainian Olympic swimmer (1956).

=== 10 ===
- Benny Andrews, 75, American painter, cancer.
- Diana Coupland, 74, British actress (Bless This House), complications following heart surgery.
- Gabriel Donoso, 46, Chilean polo player, fall from a horse.
- Fokko du Cloux, 51, Dutch mathematician and computer scientist, amyotrophic lateral sclerosis.
- Maurice Floquet, 111, French supercentenarian.
- Doug Friedline, 49, American political campaign manager (Jesse Ventura), heart attack.
- Gerald Levert, 40, American singer, accidental acute intoxication.
- Chubby Oates, 63, British comedian and actor, heart attack.
- Jack Palance, 87, American actor (Shane, City Slickers, Batman), Oscar winner (1992).
- Francisco Quina, 75, Portuguese Olympic sailor (1972).
- Nadarajah Raviraj, 44, Sri Lankan Tamil National Alliance MP, shot.
- Igor Sergeyev, 68, Russian Defense Minister (1997–2001), the only Marshal of the Russian Federation, cancer.
- Jack Williamson, 98, American science fiction author.

=== 11 ===
- Anicée Alvina, 53, French actress, lung cancer.
- Belinda Emmett, 32, Australian actress (Home and Away, Hey Dad..!, All Saints), metastatic breast cancer.
- Ernst Fiala, 66, Austrian footballer.
- Jabu Khanyile, 49, South African musician who played at the Johannesburg Live 8 concert, prostate cancer.
- Esther Lederberg, 83, American microbiologist at Stanford, discovered lambda phage, pneumonia and heart failure.
- Harry Lehotsky, 49, Canadian anti-poverty advocate and newspaper columnist, pancreatic cancer.
- John Petitbon, 75, American football player (Dallas Texans, Cleveland Browns, Green Bay Packers).
- John Shmyr, 61, Canadian ice hockey player (Winnipeg Jets, Chicago Cougars, Vancouver Blazers).
- Ronnie Stevens, 81, British actor (Space Patrol, Carry On Cruising, The Parent Trap).
- Joop van Domselaar, 78, Dutch Olympic shooter (1964).
- Yury Zyabrev, 59, Soviet Belarusian Olympic equestrian (1972).

=== 12 ===
- Joe Cooke, 58, American basketball player (Indiana Hoosiers, Cleveland Cavaliers).
- Alphonse Halimi, 74, French boxer, former world bantamweight champion, pneumonia.
- Marijan Kristan, 69, Slovenian Olympic ice hockey player (1964).
- René Libeer, 71, French boxer and Olympian (1956).
- Harvey Manning, 81, American conservationist and author.
- Mario Merola, 72, Italian singer and actor, heart attack.
- Jacob E. Smart, 97, American Air Force general and NASA executive, former deputy C-in-C of the US European Command.
- Joseph Ungaro, 76, American journalist.
- H. Donald Wilson, 82, American founder of LexisNexis, heart attack.

=== 13 ===
- Louis Chevalier, 85, French Olympic racewalker (1948, 1952).
- Desert Orchid, 27, British National Hunt racehorse, winner of the King George VI Chase on four occasions.
- Milton Drake, 94, American lyricist and performing rights administrator.
- Konrad Fuchs, 109, German believed to be oldest living Catholic priest, WWI combat veteran.
- Judah Reuben, 84, Indian cricket umpire.

=== 14 ===
- Tony Gara, 67, Zimbabwean politician, mayor of Harare, cancer.
- John Hallam, 65, Northern Irish actor.
- Isabel Hardie, 90, Canadian politician, member of the House of Commons of Canada (1962-1963).
- Montague Higgs, 67, Bahamian Olympic sailor (1972, 1984).
- Ferdinand Marschall, 82, Austrian football referee.
- Leo Nobile, 84, American football player (Penn State Nittany Lions, Washington Redskins, Pittsburgh Steelers).
- Bertrand Poirot-Delpech, 77, French writer and journalist.
- G. Gordon Strong, 92, Canadian-American publisher, pneumonia.
- Pete Suder, 90, American baseball player (Philadelphia/Kansas City Athletics).
- Owen Truelove, 69, British RAF Air Commodore, glider crash.

=== 15 ===
- George G. Blackburn, 90, Canadian author, member of the Order of Canada, cancer.
- John Blackburn, 93, American songwriter ("Moonlight in Vermont").
- Ken Ishikawa, 58, Japanese manga artist (Getter Robo), heart failure.
- Leonel Rêgo, 84, Portuguese Olympic rower (1948).
- Ana Carolina Reston, 21, Brazilian model, complications from anorexia nervosa.
- Paul Rigby, 82, Australian cartoonist, heart attack.
- David K. Wyatt, 69, American historian of Thailand, emphysema and heart failure.

=== 16 ===
- Frank Durkan, 76, Irish-born American lawyer, advocate for members of the Irish Republican Army in the US, lung infection.
- Milton Friedman, 94, American monetarist and free-market economist, winner of the 1976 Nobel Prize, heart failure.
- Gary Graver, 68, American cinematographer (F for Fake, Grand Theft Auto, The Other Side of the Wind), cancer.
- Geoff Griffin, 67, South African cricketer, heart attack.
- Jack Hinkle, 89, American football player.
- Yuri Levada, 76, Russian sociologist and pollster, heart attack.
- Jack Macpherson, 69, American surfboarder, liver and renal failure.
- Haukur Sigurðsson, 76, Icelandic Olympic alpine skier (1952).
- Paris Theodore, 63, American firearm inventor and manufacturer, multiple sclerosis.
- John Veale, 84, British classical composer, cancer.

=== 17 ===
- Sir John Acland, 77, British general, commander of forces in Rhodesia (1979–1980).
- Ruth Brown, 78, American blues singer ("So Long", "Teardrops from My Eyes", "(Mama) He Treats Your Daughter Mean"), complications from a heart attack and stroke.
- Jeffrey O. Hanson, 48, American politician, member of the Minnesota House of Representatives, Creutzfeldt–Jakob disease.
- Colin Pinch, 85, Australian cricketer.
- Tony Pithey, 73, South African cricketer, pancreatic cancer.
- Ferenc Puskás, 79, Hungarian former footballer, coach and Olympian (1952), pneumonia.
- Flo Sandon's, 82, Italian singer, winner of Sanremo Music Festival (1953).
- Bo Schembechler, 77, American football coach (Michigan Wolverines).
- Ramez Tebet, 70, Brazilian politician and lawyer, cancer.

=== 18 ===
- Movladi Baisarov, 40, Chechen warlord and commander of Federal Security Service, shot.
- Luis Carlos Gómez Centurión, 84, Argentine politician and army general, de facto Governor of Corrientes (1976-1981).
- Roger Bolton, 59, British trade unionist, cancer.
- Willie Grace, 89, American baseball player.
- Maurice W. Graham, 89, American "Patriarch of the Hobos" and author, stroke.
- Keith Rowlands, 70, Welsh CEO of the International Rugby Board.
- Cha Tae-sung, 72, South Korean footballer and Olympian (1964).
- Shuzo Yajima, 59, Japanese Olympic water polo player (1968, 1972).

=== 19 ===
- William G. Beasley, 86, British oriental historian.
- Dirk Dirksen, 69, American promoter of punk rock.
- Sir Edward Ford, 96, British assistant and private secretary to King George VI and Queen Elizabeth II (1946–1967).
- Smith Hempstone, 77, American journalist and ambassador to Kenya (1989–1993), complications from diabetes.
- Emanuel Hurwitz, 87, British violinist.
- Khir Johari, 83, Malaysian Education Minister, heart attack.
- Evelyn Keppel, 77, American baseball player (Kenosha Comets, South Bend Blue Sox).
- Pat Leal, 77, Australian rugby league footballer.
- Julio Ramos, 71, Argentine journalist, director (Ámbito Financiero), leukemia.
- Jeremy Slate, 80, American actor (The Sons of Katie Elder, True Grit, The Devil's Brigade), esophageal cancer.

=== 20 ===
- Robert Altman, 81, American film director (MASH, Nashville, The Player), BAFTA winner (1993), complications from leukemia.
- Zoia Ceaușescu, 57, Romanian mathematician, daughter of Nicolae Ceauşescu, lung cancer.
- Larry M. Davis, 63, American psychiatrist, plane crash.
- Willard Dewveall, 70, American football player (SMU Mustangs, Chicago Bears, Houston Oilers).
- W. R. P. George, 94, British archdruid, bard, novelist, nephew of Prime Minister David Lloyd George.
- Donald Hamilton, 90, Swedish-born American spy fiction writer.
- Walid Hassan, 47, Iraqi television comedian, shot.
- Chris Hayward, 81, American television writer (The Munsters, My Mother the Car) co-creator of Dudley Do-Right and The Munsters.
- Hong Xuezhi, 94, Chinese general, unspecified illness.
- Kevin McClory, 80, Irish film producer (Thunderball).
- Saúl Ubaldini, 69, Argentine labor leader and parliamentarian for the Peronist party, lung cancer.
- Andre Waters, 44, American football player (Philadelphia Eagles, Arizona Cardinals), suicide by gunshot.

=== 21 ===
- Svein Erik Bakke, 59, Norwegian entrepreneur.
- Gheorghe Calciu-Dumitreasa, 80, Romanian priest and dissident, pancreatic cancer.
- Dale DeArmond, 92, American artist and librarian, director of the Juneau Memorial Library (1958–1979).
- Pierre Gemayel, 34, Lebanese politician, shot.
- Hassan Gouled Aptidon, 90, Dijiboutian first President.
- Robert Lockwood Jr., 91, American blues guitarist and singer, respiratory failure.
- Bernard Rimland, 78, American autism researcher, prostate cancer.
- Eliezer Waldenberg, 89, Israeli Haredi rabbi.
- Sir Harold Young, 83, Australian politician, President of the Senate (1981–1983).

=== 22 ===
- John Allan Cameron, 67, Canadian pioneer of Celtic music, bone cancer.
- Muriel Castanis, 80, American sculptor, lung failure.
- Pat Dobson, 64, American baseball player (Detroit Tigers, New York Yankees, Baltimore Orioles), leukemia.
- Gilles Grégoire, 80, Canadian politician and co-founder of Parti Québécois.
- Roy Newell, 92, American abstract expressionist painter, cancer.
- John Peyton, Baron Peyton of Yeovil, 87, British Minister of Transport (1970–1974) and MP (1951–1983).

=== 23 ===
- Jerry Bails, 73, American popular culture and comic book historian, heart attack.
- Beata Beach, 95, American painter.
- Jesús Blancornelas, 70, Mexican journalist, founding editor of Zeta magazine, stomach cancer.
- Gerald M. Boyd, 56, American newspaper editor (The New York Times), lung cancer.
- Nick Clarke, 58, British radio presenter and journalist, cancer.
- Richard Clements, 78, British journalist, editor of Tribune (1961–1982).
- Betty Comden, 89, American lyricist (Singin' in the Rain), heart failure.
- Jack Ferrante, 90, American football player (Philadelphia Eagles).
- Ian Gill, 86, British army general.
- Ștefan Haukler, 64, Romanian Olympic fencer (1964, 1968, 1972).
- Roy M. Hopkins, 63, American politician, member of the Louisiana House of Representatives.
- Alexander Litvinenko, 43, Russian spy and critic of Vladimir Putin, poisoning.
- Philippe Noiret, 76, French actor (Il Postino, Cinema Paradiso), cancer.
- Anita O'Day, 87, American jazz singer, pneumonia.
- Willie Pep, 84, American Hall of Fame featherweight boxer, Alzheimer's disease.
- Chen-Lu Tsou, 83, Chinese biochemist, member of the Chinese Academy of Sciences and The World Academy of Sciences, cancer.

=== 24 ===
- Kwesi Armah, 77, Ghanaian diplomat and politician.
- Gilbert Benausse, 74, French rugby league player.
- Walter Booker, 72, American jazz bassist (Cannonball Adderley Quintet), cardiac arrest.
- John Bridgers, 84, American athletic director at the University of New Mexico, congestive heart failure.
- William Diehl, 81, American author (Primal Fear, Sharky's Machine), aortic aneurysm.
- Phyllis Fraser, 90, American actress, author, and publisher, complications from fall.
- Robert Kupperman, 71, American terrorism expert at the CSIS, complications from Parkinson's disease.
- Juice Leskinen, 56, Finnish singer-songwriter, chronic kidney disease, cirrhosis, and diabetes mellitus.
- Frank L. Madla, 69, American politician, member of the Texas State Legislature, house fire.
- Robert McFerrin, 85, American singer, heart attack.
- Fritz Schwab, 86, Swiss racewalker and Olympian (1948, 1952).
- Thelma Scott, 93, Australian actress (Number 96), heart attack.
- Max Soliven, 77, Filipino publisher of The Philippine Star, cardiac arrest.
- George W. S. Trow, 63, American author and media critic, natural causes.
- Zdeněk Veselovský, 78, Czech zoologist, heart failure.

=== 25 ===
- Luciano Bottaro, 75, Italian comic book creator (Pepito).
- Jules Deneumoulin, 96, Belgian Olympic canoeist (1936).
- Valentín Elizalde, 27, Mexican banda singer, shot.
- Ebba From, 91, Finnish Olympic sprinter (1936).
- David Hermance, 59, American Toyota engineer (Prius), plane crash.
- Melvin M. Webber, 86, American urban designer.

=== 26 ===
- Mário Cesariny de Vasconcelos, 83, Portuguese surrealist painter and author, cancer.
- Abu Hafs al-Urduni, 33, Iordan terrorist, killed by Russian troops.
- Leo Chiosso, 86, Italian songwriter.
- Dave Cockrum, 63, American comic book artist (X-Men, Legion of Super-Heroes, The Avengers), complications from diabetes.
- Isaac Gálvez, 31, Spanish cyclist and Olympian (2000), cycling accident.
- Stephen Heywood, 37, American subject of the film So Much So Fast, amyotrophic lateral sclerosis.
- Emerick Ishikawa, 86, American weightlifter and Olympian (1948).
- Anthony Jackson, 62, British actor (Bless This House, Rentaghost, Labyrinth), cancer.
- Syed Fazlul Karim, 71, Bangladeshi Islamic scholar and politician, Pir Shaheb Of Chormonai Darbar and Leader Of Islami Shashontantra Andolan, Natural Causes .
- Henry Murphy, 85, Canadian politician, member of the House of Commons of Canada (1953-1958).
- Giorgio Panto, 65, Italian television station owner and separatist politician, helicopter crash.
- Graham Roope, 60, British cricketer, heart attack.
- Rosa Mia, 81, Filipino actress and director.
- Raúl Velasco, 73, Mexican television presenter, hepatitis C.

=== 27 ===
- Bertil Antonsson, 85, Swedish wrestler and Olympian (1948, 1952, 1956, 1960).
- Don Butterfield, 83, American jazz tuba player, played with Dizzy Gillespie and Frank Sinatra, stroke-related illness.
- Bebe Moore Campbell, 56, American author (What You Owe Me), brain cancer.
- Casey Coleman, 55, American sportscaster, winner of four Emmy Awards, pancreatic cancer.
- George Doig, 93, Australian football player.
- Alan Freeman, 79, British BBC DJ, natural causes.
- Larry Henderson, 89, Canadian first regular broadcaster on CBC Television's The National, natural causes.
- Eddie Mayo, 96, American baseball player (Detroit Tigers).
- Berkeley Moir, 93-94, British architect.
- Susan Raab Simonson, 37, American theatre actress and producer, breast cancer.

=== 28 ===
- Sam Calderone, 80, American baseball player (New York Giants, Milwaukee Braves).
- Ralph A. Erickson, 82, American politician.
- Mohammad Hanif, 62, Bangladeshi politician, Mayor Of Dhaka City Corporation, multiple organ failure.
- Rose Mattus, 90, British-born American co-founder of Häagen-Dazs ice cream, natural causes.
- Max Merkel, 87, Austrian football player and coach.
- Bernard Orchard, 96, British biblical scholar.
- Lyubov Polishchuk, 57, Russian actress, spinal disease.
- Primo Volpi, 90, Italian cyclist.
- Elliot Welles, 79, Austrian-born American Holocaust survivor and B'nai B'rith's prosecutor for Nazi war criminals, heart attack.
- Martha Lipton, 93, American Opera singer, Natural Causes .

=== 29 ===
- Gary Alcorn, 70, American baseball player (Detroit Pistons, Los Angeles Lakers).
- Rosalie Bradford, 63, American Guinness World Record-holder for heaviest woman, most weight lost, complications from obesity.
- Keith Caple, 83, Australian Olympic weightlifter (1948, 1956).
- Allen Carr, 72, English anti-smoking activist, lung cancer.
- Şenol Coşkun, 18, Turkish child actor (Zıpçıktı), traffic collision.
- Jean Dulieu, 85, Dutch children's writer and comic strip cartoonist.
- Leonard Freed, 77, American photojournalist and member of the Magnum Photography Collective, complications of cancer.
- Lou Haneles, 90, American baseball player, manager, and owner.
- Akio Jissoji, 69, Japanese television and film director (Ultraman, Ultra Seven), stomach cancer.
- Emmett Kelly Jr., 82, American clown and son of Emmett Kelly, complications from pneumonia.
- Pete Mikkelsen, 67, American baseball player.
- Leon Niemczyk, 82, Polish actor, lung cancer.
- Hanumant Singh, 67, Indian cricketer and International Cricket Council match referee, organ failure due to dengue fever and hepatitis B.
- Dewey Readmore Books, 19, Library cat, euthanized.
- William E. Nichol, 88, American politician from Nebraska.

=== 30 ===
- Rafael Buenaventura, 68, Filipino Governor of the Central Bank, kidney cancer.
- Colin Cramphorn, 50, British Chief Constable for West Yorkshire, prostate cancer.
- Leonard Greene, 88, American aviation safety device inventor, lung cancer.
- Perry Henzell, 70, Jamaican film director (The Harder They Come) and author, cancer.
- Eli Mohar, 57, Israeli songwriter and columnist, pancreatic cancer.
- Shirley Walker, 61, American film score composer (Batman: Mask of the Phantasm, Final Destination, Escape from L.A.), brain aneurysm.
