= Philippines at the 1936 Summer Olympics =

- Flag of the Philippines
- IOC code: PHI
- NOC: Philippine Amateur Athletic Federation

in Berlin
- Competitors: 31 in 6 sports
- Flag bearer: Simeon Toribio
- Medals Ranked 30th: Gold 0 Silver 0 Bronze 1 Total 1

Summer Olympics appearances (overview)
- 1924; 1928; 1932; 1936; 1948; 1952; 1956; 1960; 1964; 1968; 1972; 1976; 1980; 1984; 1988; 1992; 1996; 2000; 2004; 2008; 2012; 2016; 2020; 2024

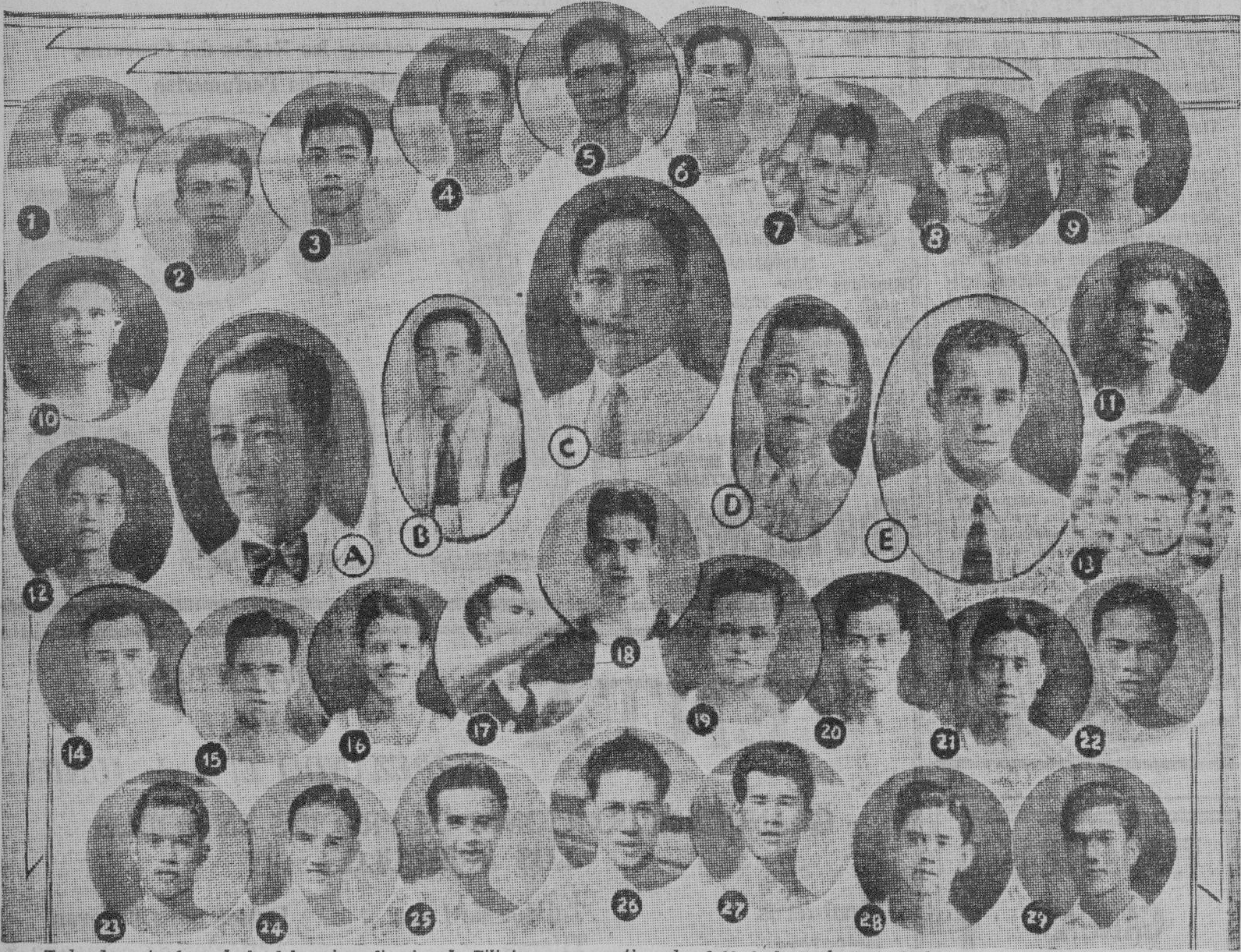
Filipino delegates of the 1936 Summer Olympics

The Philippines competed at the 1936 Summer Olympics in Berlin, Germany. 31 competitors, all men, took part in 20 events in 6 sports.

== Medalists ==
Medal	Name	Sport	Event	Date
Bronze	Miguel White	Athletics	Men's 400 metres hurdles	4 August

== Athletics ==
Men
Track & road events

Athlete	Event	Heat		Quarterfinal		Semifinal		Final	
Athlete	Event	Result	Rank	Result	Rank	Result	Rank	Result	Rank
Antonio Salcedo	100 m	Unknown	4	Did not advance					
Antonio Salcedo	200 m	Unknown	4	Did not advance					
Nemesio de Guzman	100 m	11.1	3	Did not advance					
Nemesio de Guzman	200 m	22.9	5	Did not advance					
Miguel White	110 m hurdles	Unknown	5	Did not advance					
Miguel White	400 m hurdles	53.4	1 Q	N/A		53.4	2 Q	52.8	3rd place, bronze medalist(s)
Teodoro Malasig	400 m hurdles	56.1	5	Did not advance					

Field events

Athlete	Event	Qualification		Final	
Athlete	Event	Distance	Position	Distance	Position
Simeon Toribio	High jump	1.85	=1 Q	1.85	12
Nino Ramirez	Long jump	Unknown		Did not advance	

== Basketball ==
The Philippines finished with a win–loss record of 4–1 and placed 5th overall.

Team roster

Philippines men's national basketball team – 1936 Summer Olympics roster
Players
Coaches

Pos.	No.	Name	Age – Date of birth	Height	Club	Ctr.
C		Charles Borck	19 – 4 January 1917	6 ft 1 in (1.85 m)
		Antonio Carillo	–
		Jacinto Ciria Cruz	25 – 16 August 1910
		Franco Marquicias	30 – 17 December 1905
		Primitivo Martinez	24 – 24 September 1911
		Jesús Marzan	–
		Amador Obordo	–
		Bibiano Ouano	–
		Miguel Pardo	–
		Ambrosio Padilla (C)	25 – 7 December 1910
		John Worrell	–
		Fortunato Yambao	19 – 12 October 1916

Head coach

- Dionisio Calvo

== Boxing ==
Athlete	Event	Round of 32	Round of 16	Quarterfinals	Semifinals	Final
Athlete	Event	Opposition Result	Opposition Result	Opposition Result	Opposition Result	Rank
Felipe Nunag	Flyweight	Panaitescu (ROU); W	Degryse (BEL); L	did not advance		
Oscar de Larrazabal	Bantamweight	Frederiksen (DEN); W	Stasch (GER); W	Wilson (USA); L	did not advance	
Felipe Gabuco	Featherweight	Kara (USA); L RSC 3	did not advance			
José Padilla, Jr.	Lightweight	Schmedes (GER); W	Cyraniak (POL); W	Harangi (HUN); L	did not advance	
Simplicio de Castro	Welterweight	—N/a	Sancassiani (LUX); W	Tritz (FRA); L	did not advance	

== Shooting ==
Two shooters represented the Philippines in 1936.

Men

Athlete	Event	Total	Rank
Martin Gison	25 m rapid fire pistol	Unknown	
Martin Gison	50 m pistol	511	30
Martin Gison	50 m rifle, prone	296	4
Otoniel Gonzaga	25 m rapid fire pistol	Unknown	
Otoniel Gonzaga	50 m pistol	501	37
Otoniel Gonzaga	50 m rifle, prone	291	32

== Swimming ==
Men

Ranks given are within the heat.

Athlete	Event	Heat		Semifinal		Final	
Athlete	Event	Time	Rank	Time	Rank	Time	Rank
Jikirum Adjaluddin	100 m freestyle	1:01.0	2 Q	1:00.5	=5	Did not advance	
José Obial	100 m freestyle	1:01.7	4	Did not advance			
Nils Christiansen	100 m backstroke	1:11.5	3 Q	1:11.1	5	Did not advance	
Jikirum Adjaluddin	200 m breaststroke	2:50.2	4 q	2:54.0	5	Did not advance	
Arsad Alpad	200 m breaststroke	2:52.6	2 Q	2:54.6	6	Did not advance	
Teófilo Yldefonso	200 m breaststroke	2:47.4	2 Q	2:46.8	4 q	2:51.1	7
Jikirum Adjaluddin; Arsad Alpad; Nils Christiansen; José Obial	4 × 200 m freestyle relay	—N/a		9:45.8	4	Did not advance	

== Wrestling ==
Men's Freestyle

- Enrique Jurado
