= Swimming at the 1932 Summer Olympics – Men's 200 metre breaststroke =

Men's 200 metre breaststroke at the Games of the X Olympiad
- Venue: LA84 Foundation/John C. Argue Swim Stadium
- Dates: August 11, 1932 (heats); August 12, 1932 (semifinals); August 13, 1932 (final)
- Competitors: 18 from 11 nations
- Winning time: 2:45.4

Medalists
1st place, gold medalist(s)		Yoshiyuki Tsuruta; Japan
2nd place, silver medalist(s)		Reizo Koike; Japan
3rd place, bronze medalist(s)		Teófilo Yldefonso; Philippines

The men's 200 metre breaststroke was a swimming event held as part of the swimming at the 1932 Summer Olympics programme. It was the sixth appearance of the event, which was established in 1908. The competition was held from Thursday 11 August 1932 to Saturday 13 August 1932.

Eighteen swimmers from eleven nations competed.

== Records ==
These were the standing world and Olympic records (in minutes) prior to the 1932 Summer Olympics.

World record	2:44.0	(British Guiana) Leonard Spence	New Haven (USA)	1 April 1932
Olympic record	2:48.8	(Japan) Yoshiyuki Tsuruta	Amsterdam (NED)	8 August 1928

In the first heat Yoshiyuki Tsuruta improved his own Olympic record with 2:46.2 minutes. In the first semi-final Reizo Koike bettered the Olympic record with 2:44.9 minutes.

== Results ==
=== Heats ===
Thursday 11 August 1932: The fastest two in each heat and the fastest third-placed from across the heats advanced to the final.

Heat 1

Place	Swimmer	Time	Qual.
1	Yoshiyuki Tsuruta (JPN)	2:46.2	QQ OR
2	Jikirum Adjaluddin (PHI)	2:49.9	QQ
3	Ulysse Cartonnet (FRA)	2:50.8	qq
4	Basil Francis (USA)	2:57.2	
5	Sigfrid Heyner (SWE)	3:00.7	
6	Harry Forssell (BRA)	3:14.6	

Heat 2

Place	Swimmer	Time	Qual.
1	Reizo Koike (JPN)	2:46.2	QQ
2	Erwin Sietas (GER)	2:51.0	QQ
3	Justo José Caraballo (ARG)	2:55.2	
4	Edwin Moles (USA)	2:56.8	
5	Richard Wyndham (CAN)	3:12.4	

Heat 3

Place	Swimmer	Time	Qual.
1	Teófilo Yldefonso (PHI)	2:53.7	QQ
2	Walter Spence (CAN)	2:56.5	QQ
3	Alfred Schoebel (FRA)	2:56.6	
4	John Paulsen (USA)	3:00.1	
5	Pablo Zierold (MEX)	3:15.2	

Heat 4

Place	Swimmer	Time	Qual.
1	Toivo Reingoldt (FIN)	2:53.6	QQ
2	Shigeo Nakagawa (JPN)	2:55.0	QQ

=== Semifinals ===
Friday 12 August 1932: The fastest three in each semi-final advanced to the final.

Semifinal 1

Place	Swimmer	Time	Qual.
1	Reizo Koike (JPN)	2:44.9	QQ OR
2	Yoshiyuki Tsuruta (JPN)	2:45.4	QQ
3	Jikirum Adjaluddin (PHI)	2:50.2	QQ
4	Ulysse Cartonnet (FRA)	2:50.9	
5	Toivo Reingoldt (FIN)	2:54.9	

Semifinal 2

Place	Swimmer	Time	Qual.
1	Erwin Sietas (GER)	2:47.6	QQ
2	Teófilo Yldefonso (PHI)	2:48.4	QQ
3	Shigeo Nakagawa (JPN)	2:52.4	QQ
4	Walter Spence (CAN)	2:52.7	

=== Final ===
Saturday 13 August 1932:

Place	Swimmer	Time
1	Yoshiyuki Tsuruta (JPN)	2:45.4
2	Reizo Koike (JPN)	2:46.6
3	Teófilo Yldefonso (PHI)	2:47.1
4	Erwin Sietas (GER)	2:48.0
5	Jikirum Adjaluddin (PHI)	2:49.2
6	Shigeo Nakagawa (JPN)	2:52.8
