= Swimming at the 1936 Summer Olympics – Men's 200 metre breaststroke =

Men's 200 metre breaststroke at the Games of the XI Olympiad
- Venue: Olympiapark Schwimmstadion Berlin
- Date: 13 August 1936 (heats); 14 August 1936 (semifinals); 15 August 1936 (final)
- Competitors: 25 from 11 nations
- Winning time: 2:41.5 OR

Medalists
1st place, gold medalist(s)		Tetsuo Hamuro	Japan
2nd place, silver medalist(s)		Erwin Sietas	Germany
3rd place, bronze medalist(s)		Reizo Koike	Japan

The men's 200 metre breaststroke was a swimming event held as part of the swimming at the 1936 Summer Olympics programme. It was the seventh appearance of the event, which was established in 1908. The competition was held from Thursday to Saturday, 13 to 15 August 1936.

Twenty-five swimmers from eleven nations competed. Several of the swimmers used butterfly-swimming strokes; the butterfly stroke was only developed in the early 1930s and was still regarded as a variant of breaststroke in 1936.

== Records ==
These were the standing world and Olympic records (in minutes) prior to the 1936 Summer Olympics.

World record	2:37.2	(United States) Jack Kasley	New Haven (USA)	28 March 1936
Olympic record	2:44.9	(Japan) Reizo Koike	Los Angeles (USA)	12 August 1932

In the first heat of the first round Tetsuo Hamuro set a new Olympic record with 2:42.5 minutes. He bettered his own Olympic record in the final with 2:41.5 minutes.

== Results ==
=== Heats ===
Thursday 13 August 1936: The fastest three in each heat and the fastest from across the heats advanced to the semi-finals.

==== Heat 1 ====
Place	Swimmer	Time	Qual.
1	Tetsuo Hamuro (JPN)	2:42.5	QQ OR
2	Erwin Sietas (GER)	2:44.6	QQ
3	Ray Kaye (USA)	2:48.5	QQ
4	Jikirum Adjaluddin (PHI)	2:50.2	qq
5	Julius Edgar Arp (BRA)	3:02.6	

==== Heat 2 ====
Place	Swimmer	Time	Qual.
1	Saburo Ito (JPN)	2:45.8	QQ
2	Jochen Balke (GER)	2:46.4	QQ
3	Jack Kasley (USA)	2:54.4	QQ
4	Erik Skou (DEN)	2:57.6	
5	Percy Belvin (BER)	3:09.8	
6	Albert Puddy (CAN)	3:10.2	

==== Heat 3 ====
Place	Swimmer	Time	Qual.
1	John Higgins (USA)	2:48.8	QQ
2	Arsad Alpad (PHI)	2:52.6	QQ
3	Finn Jensen (DEN)	2:55.7	QQ
4	Antônio Luiz dos Santos (BRA)	2:56.8	
5	Mohamed Hassanein (EGY)	2:58.9	
—	Jorge Berroeta (CHI)	DSQ	

==== Heat 4 ====
Place	Swimmer	Time	Qual.
1	Leonard Spence (BER)	2:52.0	QQ
2	Gerald Clawson (CAN)	2:54.7	QQ
3	Felix Erbert (TCH)	2:55.7	QQ
—	Carlos Reed (CHI)	DSQ	

==== Heat 5 ====
Place	Swimmer	Time	Qual.
1	Reizo Koike (JPN)	2:43.8	QQ
2	Teófilo Yldefonso (PHI)	2:47.4	QQ
3	Arthur Heina (GER)	2:48.5	QQ
4	Hans Malmstrøm (DEN)	2:56.5	

=== Semifinals ===
Wednesday 14 August 1936: The fastest three in each semi-final and the fastest fourth-placed advanced to the final.

Semifinal 1

Place	Swimmer	Time	Qual.
1	Reizo Koike (JPN)	2:44.5	QQ
2	Jochen Balke (GER)	2:45.4	QQ
3	Saburo Ito (JPN)	2:45.5	QQ
4	Ray Kaye (USA)	2:49.2	
5	Jikirum Adjaluddin (PHI)	2:54.0	
6	Arsad Alpad (PHI)	2:54.6	
7	Finn Jensen (DEN)	2:54.8	
8	Gerald Clawson (CAN)	2:55.6	

Semifinal 2

Place	Swimmer	Time	Qual.
1	Tetsuo Hamuro (JPN)	2:43.4	QQ
2	John Higgins (USA)	2:44.0	QQ
3	Erwin Sietas (GER)	2:44.8	QQ
4	Teófilo Yldefonso (PHI)	2:46.8	qq
5	Arthur Heina (GER)	2:47.3	
6	Jack Kasley (USA)	2:53.4	
7	Felix Erbert (TCH)	2:53.5	
—	Leonard Spence (BER)	DSQ	

=== Final ===
Rank	Athlete	Country	Time	Notes
1	Tetsuo Hamuro	Japan	2:41.5	OR
2	Erwin Sietas	Germany	2:42.9	
3	Reizo Koike	Japan	2:44.2	
4	John Higgins	United States	2:45.2	
5	Saburo Ito	Japan	2:47.6	
6	Jochen Balke	Germany	2:47.8	
7	Teófilo Yldefonso	Germany	2:51.1	

Key: OR = Olympic record
