= Ralph A. Erickson =

American politician (1924–2006)

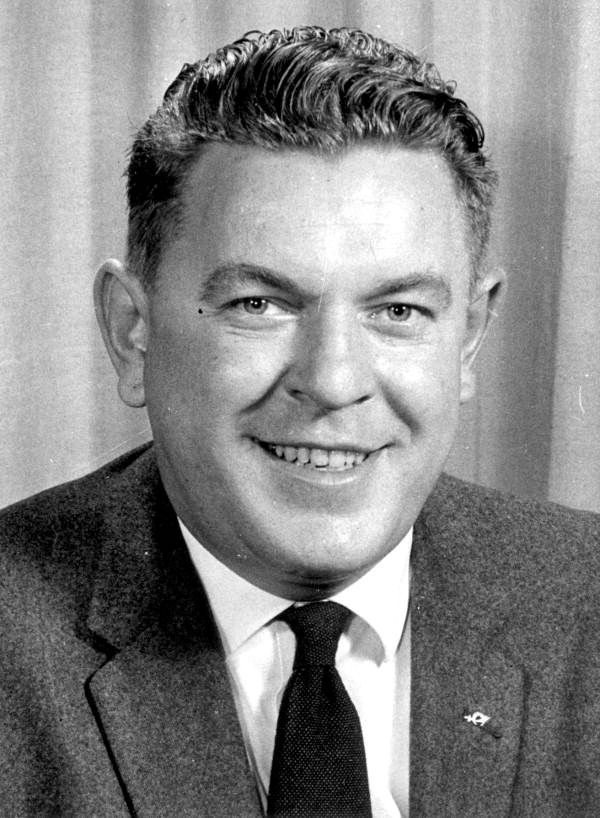
- Erickson in 1961

Member of the Florida House of Representatives from Sarasota County
- In office 1961–1962 Serving with G. M. Nelson
- Preceded by: William Boylston; George Youngberg
- Succeeded by: John Hasson; Russell C. Jordan Jr.

Personal details
- Born: Ralph Albin Erickson; September 18, 1924 Chicago, Illinois, U.S.
- Died: November 28, 2006 (aged 82) West Palm Beach, Florida, U.S.
- Party: Republican
- Spouse: Irene Erickson
- Children: 5
- Education: Illinois Institute of Technology; University of Florida

Military service
- Branch/service: United States Marine Corps
- Battles/wars: World War II

Ralph Albin Erickson (September 18, 1924 – November 28, 2006) was an American politician who was a Republican member of the Florida House of Representatives.

Erickson was born on September 18, 1924, in Chicago to Swedish immigrants.

Erickson served in the United States Marine Corps during World War II. He grated from the Illinois Institute of Technology and received a master's in architecture the University of Florida. He got into the Fulbright program to learn about architecture in 1953 in Finland. He was a musician and had a passion in fishing.

In 1961, Erickson was elected to the Florida House of Representatives alongside G. M. Nelson, succeeding William Boylston and George Youngberg. In 1962, he and Nelson were succeeded by John Hasson and Russell C. Jordan Jr. Erickson was involved in assisting with minority voter registration in Florida.

After leaving Sarasota in the late 1960s, Erickson lived in Washington, D.C., and served briefly as the chief architect of the Panama Canal Co. He also was chosen to design the Hatserim Israeli Air Force Base after Israel ceded land and a military base to Egypt as part of the Camp David Accords in promoting Middle Eastern peace.

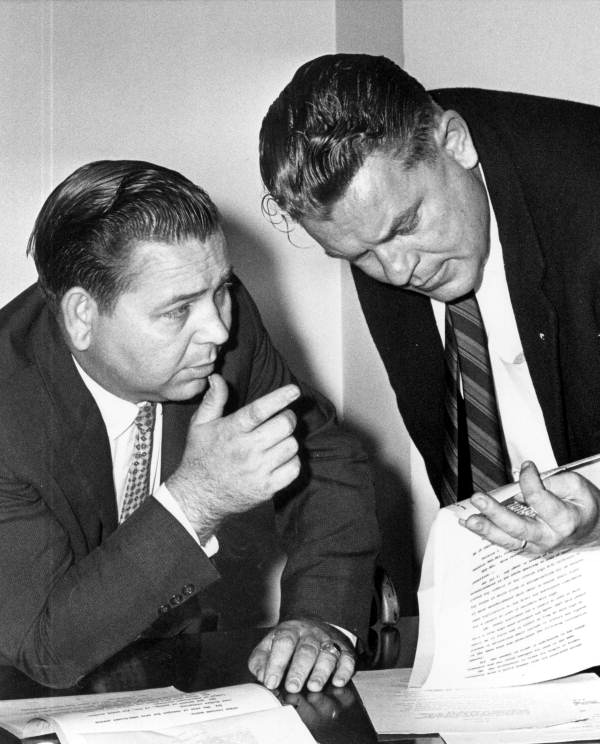
Erickson (right) with James N. Beck in 1961

Erickson died on November 28, 2006, at the age of 82, in West Palm Beach.
