= Russell C. Jordan Jr. =

American politician

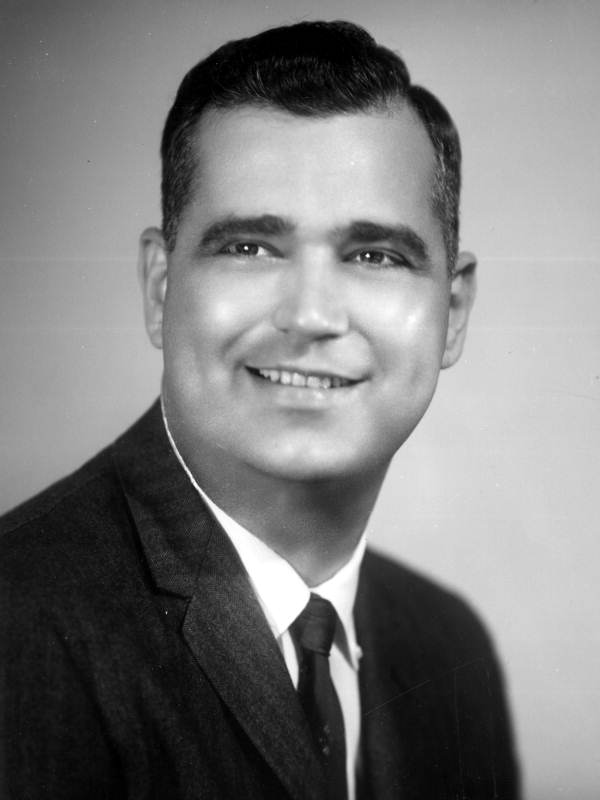
- Jordan in 1963

Member of the Florida House of Representatives from Sarasota County
- In office 1963–1965 Serving with John Hasson
- Preceded by: Ralph A. Erickson; G. M. Nelson
- Succeeded by: John Hasson

Personal details
- Born: Russell Clinger Jordan Jr. October 28, 1926 Kansas City, Missouri, U.S.
- Died: March 25, 2012 (aged 85) Sarasota, Florida, U.S.
- Party: Democratic
- Spouse: Judith Anne Jordan
- Children: 4

Russell Clinger Jordan Jr. (October 28, 1926 – March 25, 2012) was an American politician. He served as a Democratic member of the Florida House of Representatives.

Jordan was born in Kansas City, Missouri, the son of Russell Clinger Jordan Jr. and Lois Eleanore Van Evera. He attended Hopkinsville High School, graduating in 1944. Jordan served in the United States Army Air Corps, the U.S. forces in Japan, National Guard, and reserves, reaching the rank of colonel. He attended at the Office Candidate School. He then attended at the United States Army Command and General Staff College.

In 1950 he bought an insurance agency in Sarasota, continuing to run it until 2004. In 1963, Jordan was elected to the Florida House of Representatives alongside John Hasson, succeeding Ralph A. Erickson and G. M. Nelson. He left office in 1965. He was a member of the Florida Veterans for Common Sense, in which he served as the administrator.

One of his sons, Robert Michael Jordan, died in 1974. Jordan died in March 2012 at the Manor Care Retirement Home in Sarasota, Florida, at the age of 85.
