= Yoshiyuki Tsuruta =

Japanese swimmer (1903–1986)

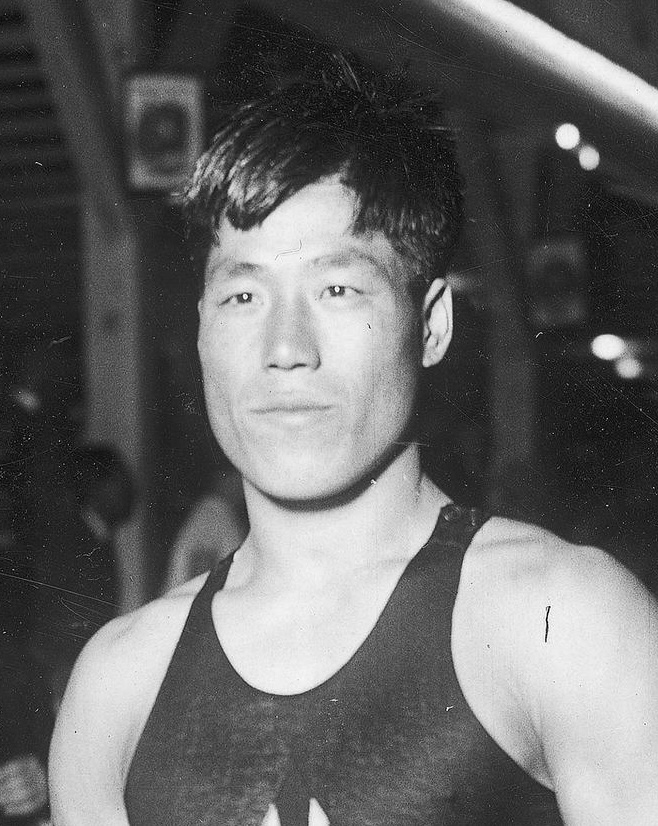
- Tsuruta c. 1928

Personal information
- Full name: 鶴田 義行
- National team: Japan
- Born: October 1, 1903 Kagoshima, Empire of Japan
- Died: July 24, 1986 (aged 82) Matsuyama, Ehime, Japan

Sport
- Sport: Swimming
- Strokes: Breaststroke
Medal record
Men's swimming
Representing Japan
Olympic Games
Gold medal – first place	1928 Amsterdam	200 m breaststroke
Gold medal – first place	1932 Los Angeles	200 m breaststroke

Yoshiyuki Tsuruta (鶴田 義行, Tsuruta Yoshiyuki) (October 1, 1903 – July 24, 1986) was a Japanese swimmer. He won a gold medal in the Amsterdam Olympics and the Los Angeles Olympics.

== Biography ==
Tsuruta was born in Ishiki Village, Kagoshima District, Kagoshima prefecture, Japan. (Present Kagoshima City). He went to work for the Japanese Government Railways in 1920, but volunteered for the Japanese marines at the Imperial Japanese Navy's Sasebo Naval District in 1924.

Tsuruta was sent to compete in the 2nd Meiji Shrine Games in 1925, winning the 200-meter breaststroke event with a time of 3 minutes, 12.3 seconds. Selected to be a member of the 1928 Japanese Olympic team, he beat his personal record in the semi-finals with a time of 2 minutes 50.0 seconds. During the finals held on August 8, he won the gold medal with a new world record time of 2 minutes, 48.8 seconds. Tsuruta was the second Japanese to be awarded with a gold medal (after Mikio Oda in the Triple jump on August 2).

After his return to Japan, Tsuruta enrolled in the law school of Meiji University. He continued to swim, setting a new world record of 2 minutes 45.0 seconds for the 200-meter breaststroke in 1929 in a competition in Kyoto. On his graduation from Meiji University, he was employed by the South Manchurian Railway, who sponsored his participation in the 1932 Los Angeles Olympics. Although teammate Reizo Koike had set a new world record in the semifinals, Tsuruta defeated Koike in the finals, with a time of 2 minutes 45.2 seconds, becoming the first Japanese to win gold medals in two consecutive Olympic games.

In 1934, Tsuruta was employed by the city government of Nagoya as physical education director. He was recalled to active duty service with the Imperial Japanese Navy in 1943. Following the end of World War II, he joined the Ehime Shimbun, a newspaper company based in Ehime Prefecture. From 1948, he was on the board of directors of the Ehime Prefecture Athletic Association, President of the Matsuyama Swimming Association swimming, and advisor to the Japan Swimming Federation and the Japan Amateur Sports Association. From 1949, he strove to introduce swimming as a required activity in schools. In 1962, Tsuruta was honored with the Medal with the Purple Ribbon by the Japanese government and was inducted into the International Swimming Hall of Fame in 1968. He was also awarded the Order of the Rising Sun, 4th class, by the Japanese government in 1974. Tsuruta died in 1986 of a stroke at age 82.

== See also ==
- List of members of the International Swimming Hall of Fame
- World record progression 200 metres breaststroke
