= Hassanein =

Hassanein (Arabic: حسنين) is an Arabic surname. Notable people with the name include:

- Ali Hassanein or Ali Hussnein a.k.a. Ali Sadiq Hussnein, (1925–2018), Libyan politician
- Ali Hassanein (actor) (1939–2015), Egyptian actor
- Ahmed Hassanein Pasha (1889–1946), or Aḥmad Moḥammad Makhlūf Ḥasanēn al-Būlākī, Egyptian courtier, diplomat, Olympic athlete in fencing, photographer, writer, politician and explorer, tutor then chamberlain to King Farouk
- Ahmed Hassanein (American football) (born 2002), American-Egyptian football player
- Hassan Hassanein (1916–1957), Egyptian golfer
- Mohamed Hassanein Heikal (1923–2016), Egyptian journalist
- Mohamed Hassanein (born 1913), Egyptian swimmer
- Muhammad Hassanein, Egyptian politician and government minister
- Mustafa Hassanein aka Mustafa Mohammad (born 1968), IFBB professional bodybuilder
- Rami Hassanein (1975-2016), Egyptian officer
