= Finn Jensen =

Finn Jensen can refer to:

- Finn Jensen (darts player) (1957/58–2007), Danish darts player
- Finn Jensen (speedway rider) (born 1957), Danish speedway rider
- Finn Jensen (swimmer) (1914–1987), Danish swimmer
