= Ralph Erickson =

Ralph Erickson may refer to:

- Ralph Erickson (baseball) (1902–2002), Major League Baseball relief pitcher
- Ralph R. Erickson (born 1959), American lawyer and judge
- Ralph E. Erickson (born 1928), American lawyer
- Ralph A. Erickson (1924–2006), American architect and member of the Florida House of Representatives
