= Jack Kasley =

American swimmer (1916–1989)

- Kasley between 1934-1937 while swimming for the University of Michigan

Personal information
- Full name: John Hare Kasley
- Nickname: "Jack"
- National team: United States
- Born: January 2, 1916 Oak Park, Illinois, U.S.
- Died: July 16, 1989 (aged 73) Wayne, New Jersey, U.S.
- Spouses: Esther Louise Lowman (1941); Genevieve Catlett
- Children: 2

Sport
- Sport: Swimming
- Strokes: Breaststroke
- College team: University of Michigan
- Coach: Matthew Mann (U. Michigan); Robert J. H. Kiphuth (36 Olympics)
Medal record
Representing the United States
NCAA
Gold medal – first place	1937 Championships	200 yd breaststroke
Gold medal – first place	1936 Championships	200 yd breaststroke
Gold medal – first place	1935 Championships	200 yd breaststroke

John "Jack" Hare Kasley (January 2, 1916 – July 16, 1989) was an American competition swimmer who competed for the University of Michigan, and represented the United States in the 200-meter breaststroke at the 1936 Summer Olympics in Berlin though he finished tenth, not making the finals. A world record holder, he set a long course world record of 2:37.2 in the 200-meter breaststroke in March 1936 which held for five years. Graduating the University of Michigan with a BS in Aeronautical Engineering in 1936-7, after completing a Masters he relocated to New Jersey in 1938 where he worked for Curtis-Wright Corporation for thirty-three years eventually holding the office of Director of Engineering. In his late career, he served as business administrator and engineer for the Township of Wayne, New Jersey.

== Early life ==
Kasley was born January 2, 1916 in Oak Park, Illinois to Mr. and Mrs. Jack Kasley. In 1933, he graduated greater Chicago's Oak Park High School, which had their own swimming pool by 1927. During his High School career, at 17, he won the 100-yard breaststroke at the Illinois State Championship in a state record time of 1:13.1 at the Oak Park Pool in early March, 1933.

== World records ==
In a career highlight, Kasley set the long course world record in the 200-meter breaststroke on March 28, 1936 in New Haven, Connecticut at the National Collegiate Athletic Association (NCAA) national championship with a time of 2:37.2. Kasley was performing the breaststroke with the breaststroke kick, but using the overhand recovery out of the water, sometimes called the butterfly-breaststroke at the time, or confusingly the butterfly stroke. By 1937, Kasley also held the world record for the 200-yard breaststroke with a time of 2:22.5, though it was not part of Olympic competition, and he bettered his own record with a time of 2:20.5 for the event in February 1937 in a meet against the University of Iowa in Iowa City.

== 1936 Berlin Olympics ==
At the 1936 Berlin Olympics, Kasley competed in the semifinals of the men's 200-meter breaststroke, recording a time of 2:53.4, and finishing in tenth place. Kasley received pre-Olympic training and was managed at the Olympics by Head U.S. Olympic swimming coach Robert J. H. Kiphuth, a Yale Coach and International Swimming Hall of Fame inductee. Two other Michigan swimmers and a diver were part of the 1936 Olympic team, which included backstroker Taylor Drysdale and freestyler Jim Cristy, though neither were able to medal. Tetsuo Hamuro of Japan took the gold with a time of 2:41.5, Erwin Siestas of Germany took the silver with a time of 2:42.9, Reizo Koike of Japan took the bronze with a time of 2:44.2.

=== University of Michigan ===
Kasley attended the University of Michigan, and swam for the Michigan Wolverines swimming and diving team in National Collegiate Athletic Association (NCAA) competition from 1933 to 1937, under Hall of Fame Coach Matthew Mann. In 1937, he co-captained the team, and may have caused some controversy continuing to compete for Michigan after having graduated the University. He graduated around 1936 year with a B.S. degree in Aeronautical Engineering, and in 1937-8, Kasley received a Masters degree from Michigan. Swimming as a Michigan Freshman at the National Indoor AAU Championships in April 1934, Kasley placed a close second in the 220-yard breaststroke to Leonard Spence, who broke the world record with a time of 2:43.5. During a three period in his swimming career at Michigan, he won three consecutive NCAA national championships in the 200-yard breaststroke (1935, 1936, 1937), and was a member of Michigan's NCAA-winning teams in the 300-yard medley relay (1935, 1936, 1937). In scholastic honors, he was a member of the Michigamua Honor Society later known as the Order of Angell, which recognized athletes and collegiate leaders at the University of Michigan.

=== Careers ===
After moving from Illinois, he lived in Michigan attending the University, and in 1938, relocated to Wayne, New Jersey to begin his engineering career. In his longest career stint, he was a Director of Engineering for New Jersey's Curtiss-Wright Corporation for thirty-three years from 1938-1971, spending a number of those years at the plant in Caldwell, New Jersey, roughly eight miles South of Wayne, New Jersey where he resided. He worked around nine years in public service, serving as the business administrator for Wayne Township beginning around 1979, and later worked in the department of engineering for Wayne Township.

== Marriages ==
At 25, Kasley married Esther Louise Lowman on Saturday, October 4, 1941 at the Glen Ridge Congregation Church in Paterson, New Jersey. The couple met while Lowman was working as a Secretary for Curtis-Wright. Esther Lowman was born in Elmira, New York, and attended Maryland College for Women. After the death of his first wife, Esther Lowman, in 1976, Kasley married Genevieve Catlett, originally of Louisiana, who attended University of Louisiana Batan Rouge. Catlett relocated to Wayne, New Jersey around 1950.

=== Death and family ===
Kasley died at the age of 73 on July 16, 1989, at St. Joseph's Hospital in Patterson, New Jersey and was buried at New York's Riverside Cemetery. Services were held on July 20, 1989 at the Packanack Community Church, in Wayne, New Jersey, his town of residence. He was survived by his second wife Genvieve Catlett and a son. He was predeceased by his first wife Esther Lowman in 1976, with whom he had a daughter who predeceased him in 1954. He had been a member of the Men of Leisure of Packanack Church.

Records
Preceded by Jacques Cartonnet	Men's 200-meter breaststroke world record-holder (long course); March 28, 1936 – July 6, 1941	Succeeded by Alfred Nakache

== See also ==
- List of University of Michigan alumni
- World record progression 200 metres breaststroke
