= John Paulsen =

John Paulsen can refer to:

- John Paulsen (swimmer) (1914–2011), American Olympic swimmer
- John Paulsen (volleyball) (born 1951), Canadian Olympic volleyball player
- J. J. Paulsen (born 1959), American sitcom writer
- John Dyrby Paulsen (born 1963), Danish politician

== See also ==
- John Paulson (born 1955), American billionaire hedge fund manager
