= Shigeo Nakagawa =

Japanese swimmer

Personal information
- Born: January 10, 1910 Aichi Prefecture, Japan

Sport
- Sport: Swimming
- Strokes: Breaststroke

Shigeo Nakagawa (中川 重雄, Nakagawa Shigeo; born 10 January 1910, date of death unknown) was a Japanese breaststroke swimmer. He competed in the 1932 Summer Olympics. In 1932, he finished sixth in the 200 metre breaststroke event. He was born in Aichi Prefecture.
