= Erwin Sietas =

German swimmer (1910–1989)

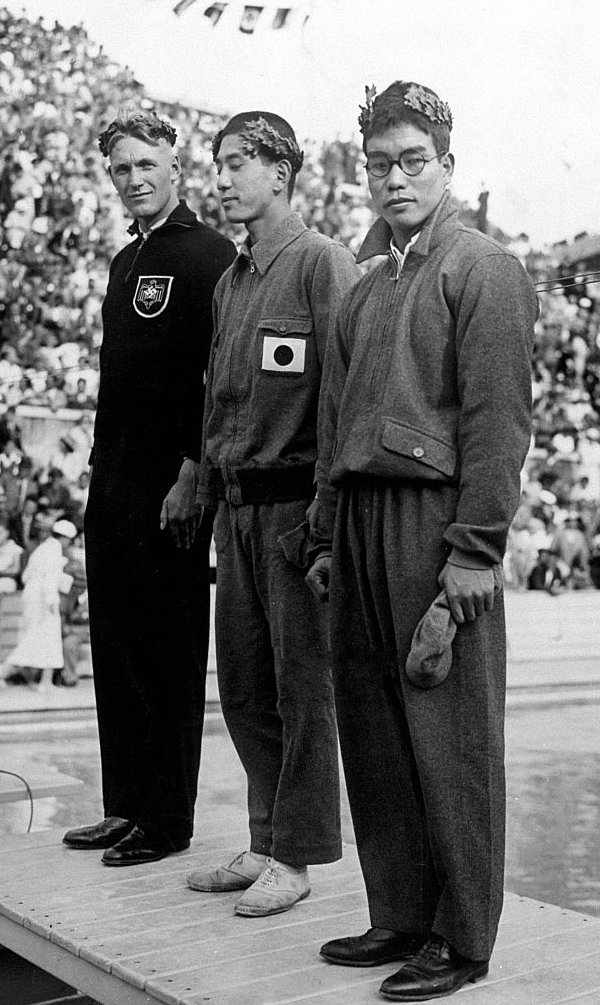
- Erwin Sietas, Tetsuo Hamuro and Reizo Koike at the 1936 Olympics

Personal information
- Nickname: Erwin Sietas
- National team: Germany
- Born: 24 July 1910 Cranz, Hamburg, German Empire
- Died: 20 July 1989 (aged 78) Hamburg, West Germany

Sport
- Sport: Swimming
- Club: Hamburger Schwimmclub 1879
Medal record
Men's swimming
Representing Germany
Olympic Games
Silver medal – second place	1936 Berlin	200 m breaststroke
European Championships
Bronze medal – third place	1931 Paris	200 m breaststroke
Gold medal – first place	1934 Magdeburg	200 m breaststroke
Silver medal – second place	1938 London	200 m breaststroke

Erwin Sietas (24 July 1910 – 20 July 1989) was a German swimmer who specialized in the 200 m breaststroke. He competed at the 1928, 1932 and 1936 Olympics and finished in fourth, fourth and second place, respectively. Sietas was known for his fast start; in 1932 and 1936 he led he race, but faded at the finish. He won three medals at the European championships, including a gold in 1934.

Between 1928 and 1936 Sietas won all national titles, and in 1935 set a world record in the 200 m breaststroke. He was the only European breaststroke swimmer to win an Olympic medal between 1928 and 1952. In 1992 he was inducted into the International Swimming Hall of Fame.

== See also ==
- List of members of the International Swimming Hall of Fame
- World record progression 200 metres breaststroke
