= Basil Francis =

American swimmer (1915–1974)

Basil M. Francis
- Francis circa 1932, Olympic photo

Personal information
- Full name: Basil Heal Francis
- Nationality: USA
- Born: February 21, 1915 Searsmont, Maine, U.S.
- Died: March 23, 1974 (aged 58) Barnstable, Massachusetts, U.S.
- Education: Mercersburg Academy; Worcester Academy (Swam 1931-33); Rhode Island School of Design
- Occupation: Telecom engineer
- Height: 5 ft 11 in (180 cm)
- Weight: 163 lb (74 kg)

Sport
- Sport: Swimming
- Event: 200 meter breaststroke
- Strokes: Breaststroke
- Club: Providence YMCA (1926-30); Boston Swimming Association (1930-1932)
- Coach: E. Leo Barry (Providence YMCA); Bob Muir (Boston Swim. Association); Robert J. H. Kiphuth (Olympics)

Basil M. Heal Francis (February 21, 1915 – March 23, 1974) was an American swimmer, specializing in breaststroke, who competed for the strong swimming programs at Mercersburg and Worcester Academies, and participated with the U.S. Olympic team in the 1932 Los Angeles Olympics, swimming the 200-meter breaststroke. After graduating the Rhode Island School of Design, he worked as a telephone company engineer.

== Early life and swimming ==
Francis was born February 21, 1915 in Searsmont, Maine as Basil Heal. After his adoption in nearby Morrill, Maine at the age of five in September, 1920 by parents Arthur Rowland Francis and Marion Glover Hunt Francis, he took the name Basil Francis and moved to Providence, Rhode Island where he grew up. At age 11, he began swimming for E. Leo Barry at the Providence YMCA with an extensive facility and pool originally on Providence's Broad Street where he trained for two years, though he may have been coached by Barry intermittently through 1930-31 as he continued to represent the Providence YMCA through that year. An accomplished coach and member of the Rhode Island Aquatic Hall of Fame, Barry would coach varsity swimming at Brown University in Providence, Rhode Island, and had earlier coached swimming at Pennsylvania's Mercersburg Academy in the early 1920's before Basil attended.

While living in Providence, around August 21, 1931, as a multi-stroke competitor, Francis won the New England Amateur American Athletic Union Junior 300 meter medley swim at the large outdoor Rocky Point Pool in greater Providence, Rhode Island with a time of 4:30.

== High school era ==
Around 1930-1931, Francis swam for Mercersburg Academy, a private school with a strong history of producing Olympic swimmers, before transferring to Massachusetts' Worcester Academy. At only forty miles North of his hometown in Providence, Worcester was considerably closer than Mercersburg, Pennsylvania. Enrolling in the Fall of 1931, he was a standout swimmer for Worcester Academy, a private boarding school with a strong history of academic achievement, where he first came to prominence winning the 440-yard breaststroke title in the summer of 1931 in Brookline, MA. at the New England Senior Championship in a time of 6:45. At Worcester Academy he was one of the top contributors on the team, and broke a standard school record swimming the 100-yard breaststroke in a time of 1:10 in January 1932. He was undefeated in his events competing for Worcester in the 1932 season. On March 1, 1930, Francis won the National Junior AAU 220-yard breaststroke title in Providence, Rhode Island with a final time of 3:03.2, a National Junior AAU record.

== 1932 Olympic trials ==
For club teams, Francis also swam representing the Boston Swimming Association (BSA) in 1932 at the Olympic trials at Coney Island Park in Cincinnati, Ohio in mid-July. He he qualified for the 1932 Olympics by placing third in his specialty, the 200-meter breaststroke with a 2:58 in the final heat, though he may have had a faster time in the preliminary heat. Swimmers at the trials complained of the warm temperature of the water. While swimming for the Boston Association, he was likely coached by Bob Muir, an International Swimming Hall of Fame inductee, who coached the BSA through 1935 when he moved to coach Williams College. Muir was a former YMCA national breaststroke champion himself, who would coached the Freshmen swim team at Harvard University before having a long coaching career at Williams College.

== 1932 Los Angeles Olympics ==
Becoming Rhode Island and Worcester Academy's first Olympic athlete, and having just turned seventeen, he competed in the men's 200 metre breaststroke at the 1932 Los Angeles Olympics placing thirteenth overall with a time of 2:57.2, close to his former time at the Cincinnati Olympic trials. Francis was managed by US Olympic Head Coach Robert J. H. Kiphuth, long serving coach at Yale University, and a member of the International Swimming Hall of Fame. In a strong showing by Asian swimmers, Yoshiyuki Tsuruta won the gold with a time of 2:45.4, Reizo Koike won the silver with a time of 2:46.6, and Teofilo Yldefonso of the Philippines won the bronze with a time of 2:47.1.

=== 1936 Olympic trials ===
In 1936, Basil's father Arthur R. Francis, acting as Chairman, local swimmer Bud Latham, and Basil's coach E. Leo Barry formed a committee to bring the 1936 Berlin Olympic trials to Basil's hometown of Providence, Rhode Island and compete at the outdoor, saltwater, Rocky Point Pool, part of Rocky Point State Park. With Basil's father Arthur a strong supporter of the swimming community, the committee succeeded, and the trials were held in Providence from July 10-12, 1936, with swimmers that included 1936 Olympic backstroke gold medalist Adolph Kieffer, and 400-meter freestyle gold medalist Jack Medica. Basil may have been in attendance, though he had ended his elite training.

=== College ===
Though in his swimming years he had considered attending Brown University and competing with their strong swimming program, Basil attended the Rhode Island School of Design, a school with an artistic focus, in his home of Providence, Rhode Island, graduating in 1937.

In careers, Francis worked as a telephone company engineer.

He died on March 23, 1974 at the age of 59 in Barnstable, Massachusetts.

=== Honors ===
Honored for his achievement as one of the earliest Olympians from Rhode Island and a regional backstroke champion, in 1982 he was made a member of the Rhode Island Aquatic Hall of Fame.
