= Saburo Ito =

Japanese swimmer

Personal information
- Born: July 18, 1915
- Died: January 19, 1978 (aged 62)

Sport
- Sport: Swimming

Saburo Ito (Japanese: 伊藤 三郎, Itō Saburō, 18 July 1915 – 19 January 1978) was a Japanese breaststroke swimmer who competed in the 1936 Summer Olympics. In 1936 he finished fifth in the 200 metre breaststroke event.

In 1938, he graduated from Meiji University and he started working at Showa Steel Works. In 1941, he participated in the Battle of Hong Kong as a member of the Japanese 23rd Army . On 22 December 1941, he was reported to have suffered from a wound during battle. He served as the director of the swimming department at Meiji University, and he was a director at the Japan Swimming Federation and the Vice President of the Saitama Swimming Federation. He died of bladder cancer on 19 January 1978.
