= Alfred Schoebel =

French swimmer

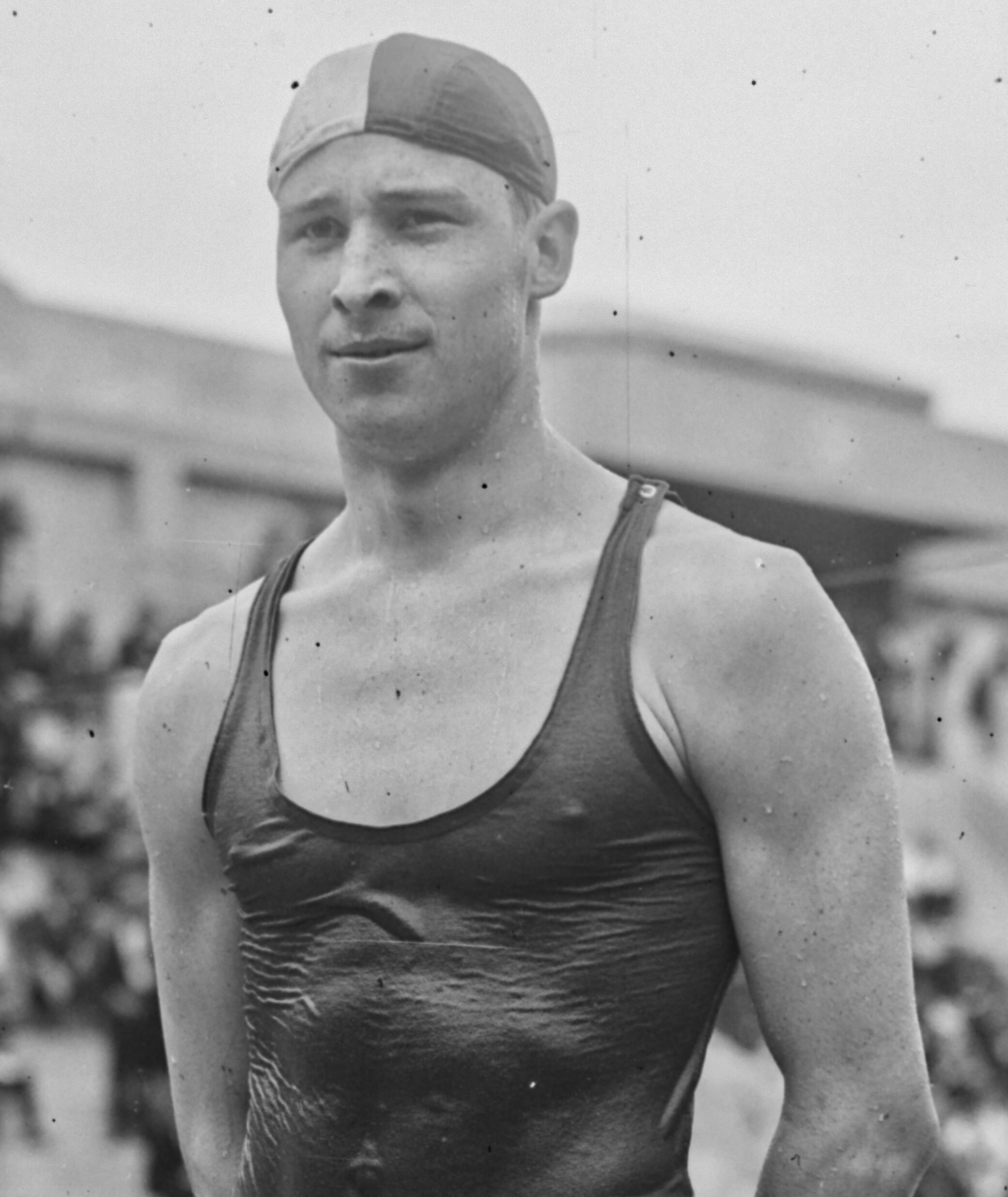
- Alfred Schoebel in 1929

Personal information
- Born: 14 May 1911 Strasbourg, France
- Died: 16 October 2000 (aged 89) Paris, France

Sport
- Sport: Swimming
- Strokes: breaststroke

Alfred Schoebel (14 May 1911 – 16 October 2000) was a French swimmer. He competed in the men's 200 metre breaststroke at the 1932 Summer Olympics.
