= Ray Kaye =

American swimmer (1912–1983)

- Kaye in later years

Personal information
- Full name: Raymond Kaye
- Nickname: "Ray"
- National team: United States
- Born: February 16, 1912 Detroit, Michigan, U.S.
- Died: July 17, 1983 (aged 71) Detroit, Michigan, U.S.
- Occupations: Contract painter, decorator
- Spouse: Elizabeth Ann Adelhart (1937)
- Children: 3

Sport
- Sport: Swimming
- Strokes: Breaststroke
- Club: Detroit Athletic Club (DAC)
- Coach: Frank Butler (St. Clair Center); Clarence Pinkston (DAC, 1934-39); Robert J. H. Kiphuth ('36 Olympics)

Raymond Kaye (February 16, 1912 – July 17, 1983) was an American competition swimmer who represented the United States at the 1936 Summer Olympics in Berlin, Germany, where he swam the 200-meter breaststroke in a time of 2:49.2, finishing around ninth overall. Prior to the Olympics, Kaye set a world record in the 500-meter breaststroke in Toledo, Ohio with a time of 7:23.8 in November, 1935. First gaining membership in 1935, Kaye remained active in swimming and aquatics at the Detroit Athletic Club throughout his life. After marrying Elizabeth Adelhart in 1937, he raised a family, and worked as a contract painter and decorator in his birthplace of greater Detroit for over forty years.

Kaye was born February 16, 1912 in Detroit, Michigan, and graduated Detroit's Cass Technical High School.

== Early swimming ==
At the age of 21 in August, 1933, Kaye swam for the St. Clair Recreation Center, placing third in the 110-yard breaststroke at the Michigan State Championship meet in Belle Isle, Michigan. At the St. Clair Center, Kaye was coached by Frank Butler. Don McClellan of the Detroit Athletic Club finished ahead of Kaye with a comfortable margin, placing first at the State Championship with a state record time of 1:24.5. Kaye swam for the Detroit Athletic Club by 1935. At 22, in February, 1934, he played with the St. Clair Recreation Water Polo Team in a meet against the Detroit Yacht Club as part of the Detroit Water Polo League.

Kaye swam the breast stroke using an underwater forward stroke, never an above the water stroke recovery then known as the butterfly breast.

== World record ==
At the height of his swimming achievements, at the age of 23, Kaye established a world record in the 500-meter breaststroke with a time of 7:23.8 in Toledo, Ohio at an AAU-sponsored meet on November 15, 1935. He broke the old record of 7:33.1 by nine seconds, that had been previously set by Germany's P. Schwartz, in January, 1933. Kaye had set an earlier record while competing for the U.S. National team in a competition with the Japanese team in Tokyo in the summer of 1935.

In 1937, Kaye was the AAU National Champion in the 200-meter breaststroke, and was on a world-record setting relay team for the 300-meter medley relay.

== Detroit Athletic Club profile ==
As a nationally distinguished program, Kaye's Detroit Athletic Club won the National AAU Outdoor swimming championships in 1934 and 1935, and in 1936 were second. Kaye first joined the Dallas Athletic Club team at age 23, around 1935. Continuing to compete with the DAC in July, 1938 under Coach Clarence Pinkston, Kaye was scheduled to swim in the 1938 AAU National Outdoor Swimming Championship in Louisville, Kentucky. Kaye swam during the coaching tenure of Pinkston throughout his time with the Detroit Athletic Club, with Pinkston acting as Coach from 1926-1939, when the Detroit Club switched exclusively to a Junior Aquatic Program. Pinkson was a former 1920 Antwerp Olympic gold medalist, and International Swimming Hall of Fame inductee, who directed the aquatic program at the D.A.C. from 1927-1956.

In the 1936 Olympic trials, Kaye finished third in the 200-meter breaststroke, a finish adequate to make the U.S. Olympic team.

== 1936 Berlin Olympics ==
Kaye competed in the semifinals of the 1936 Olympic men's 200-meter breaststroke in Berlin, where he was managed and trained by Head U.S. Olympic swimming coach Robert J. H. Kiphuth, a Yale Coach and International Swimming Hall of Fame inductee. Recording a time of 2:49.2, and finishing around ninth overall, Kaye did not advance to swim in the finals. In a time when Japan was a dominant nation in swimming, American Jack Kasley had set a record in the event in March 1936, but had been unable to maintain his conditioning, and in his semi-final match finished sixth, failing to advance to the finals. In the finals, Tetsuo Hamuro of Japan took the gold with a time of 2:41.5, though he was nearly caught at the end by second place finisher Erwin Sietas. Sietas of Germany took the Silver with a time of 2:42.9, and Reizo Koike of Japan took the bronze with a time of 2:44.2.

=== American record ===
In late 1936, Kaye won the 200-meter breaststroke at the AAU National Outdoor championships in Los Angeles, with an American record time of 2:52.2. His time beat the former American record of 3:01.9 set in 1933 by John Paulsen by over eight seconds.

He married Elizabeth Adelhart in 1937, daughter of Theresa Miller Adelhart and Henry J. Adelhart. Subsequent to his marriage, he continued to swim, and train throughout the 1930's.

=== Late careers and avocations ===
In career pursuits, beginning around 1943, Kaye worked as a contract painter, and decorator in greater Detroit, remaining in the profession for close to forty years.

In club participation, he played water basketball for the Beavers by the 1940's, one of the teams at the Detroit Athletic Club. Water basketball began as a rough game with limited rules, and the team was composed of greater Detroit professionals, many of whom had been former club athletes. Kaye began as a member of the Detroit Athletic Club beginning in the 1930's, and remained for a period of around 45 years. He had served as a President of the Beavers, and of the Kiwanis Club in Detroit.

Kaye died July 17, 1983 at St. John Hospital at the age of 71 in Detroit, Michigan, and was survived by his wife, the former Elizabeth "Betty" Ann Adelhart, two sons, and a daughter. His son Raymond Jr. was a standout swimmer for the Detroit Institute of Technology, and later coached High School swimming at Detroit's St. Claire Shores Lakeview High. Raymond Sr. served as an Elder with Detroit's East United Presbyterian Church, and was a member of other Churches including Fort Street Presbyterian. Services for Raymond Sr. were held July 20, 1983 at Calvin East Presbyterian Church, and his cremation took place at Detroit's Forest Lawn Cemetery.
