= Jorge Berroeta =

Chilean swimmer (1918–1994)

Jorge Berroeta Eckart
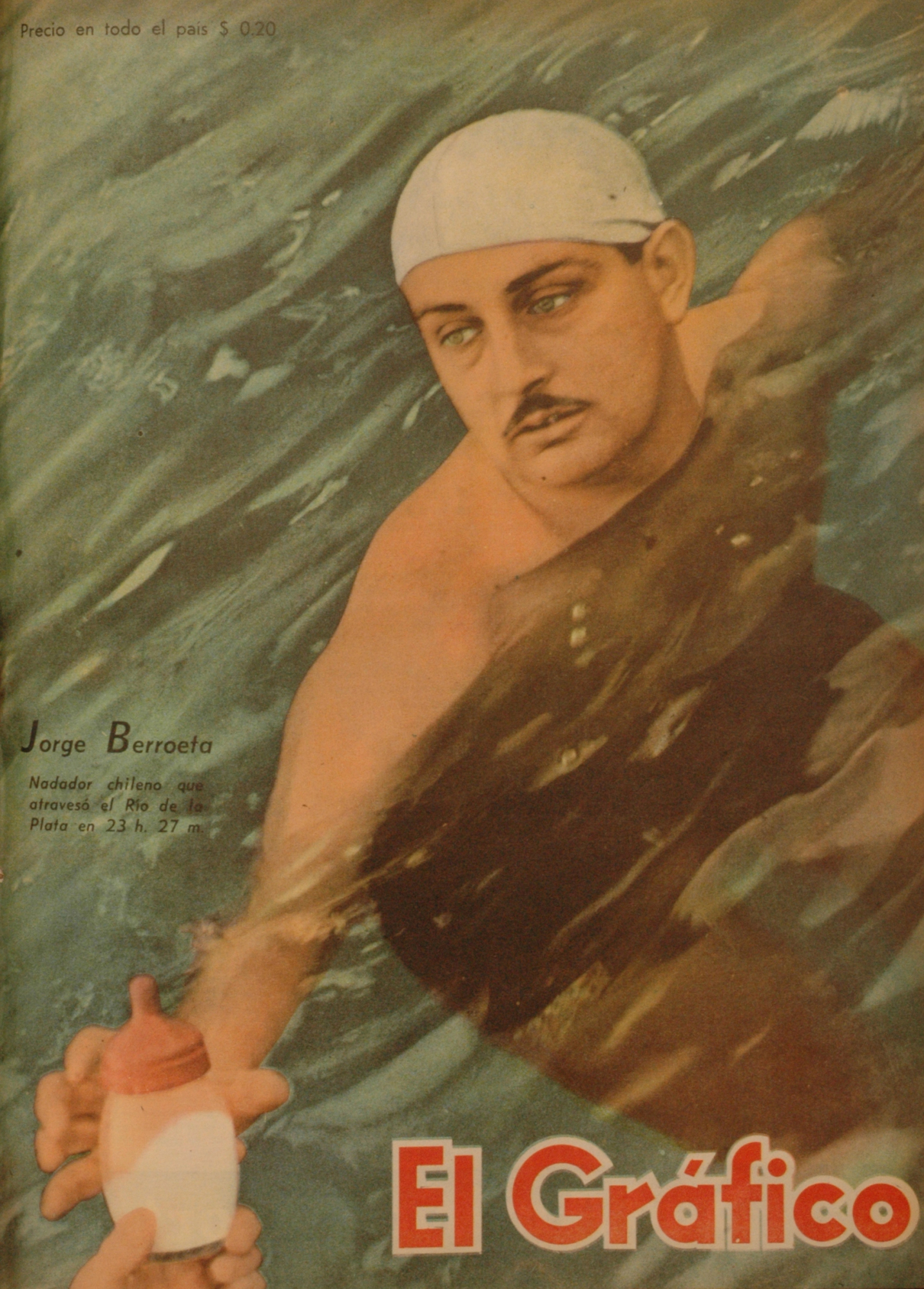

Personal information
- Full name: Jorge Wenceslao Berroeta
- Born: 8 May 1918 Santiago, Chile
- Died: 29 August 1994 (aged 76) Valparaíso, Chile

Sport
- Sport: Swimming

Jorge Berroeta (8 May 1918 – 29 August 1994) was a Chilean swimmer. He competed in the men's 200 metre breaststroke at the 1936 Summer Olympics.
