= Jochen Balke =

German swimmer (1917–1944)

Joachim Balke
Personal information
- Nationality: German
- Born: 26 March 1917 Dortmund, Germany
- Died: 19 January 1944 (aged 26) Vitebsk, Russian SFSR, Soviet Union

Sport
- Sport: Swimming
Medal record
Representing Germany
European Championships
Gold medal – first place	1938 London	200m breaststroke

Joachim "Jochen" Balke (September 12, 1917 – MIA January 19, 1944) was a German breaststroke swimmer who won a gold medal at the 1938 London European Championship and competed in the 1936 Summer Olympics.

He was born in Dortmund and died during World War II.

In 1936 he finished sixth in the 200 metre breaststroke event. In 1938 he finished first at the European Championship in London in the 200 m breaststroke event.
