= Percy Belvin =

Bermudian swimmer

Personal information
- Born: 26 December 1912 Hamilton Parish, Bermuda

Sport
- Sport: Swimming

Percy William Selby Belvin (born 26 December 1912, date of death unknown) was a Bermudian swimmer. He competed in the men's 200 metre breaststroke at the 1936 Summer Olympics.
