= Arthur Heina =

German swimmer

Personal information
- Nationality: German
- Born: 22 February 1915 Gladbeck, Germany
- Died: 27 February 1986 (aged 71) Königswinter, Germany

Sport
- Sport: Swimming

Arthur Heina (22 February 1915 – 27 February 1986) was a German swimmer. He competed in the men's 200 metre breaststroke at the 1936 Summer Olympics.
