= Richard Wyndham =

Canadian swimmer (1911–1991)

Personal information
- Full name: Richard Wyndham
- Born: 19 October 1911
- Died: 12 December 1991 (aged 80)

Sport
- Sport: Swimming

Richard Wyndham (19 October 1911 – 12 December 1991) was a Canadian swimmer. He competed in the men's 200 metre breaststroke at the 1932 Summer Olympics.
