= Carlos Reed =

Chilean swimmer

Personal information
- Born: 19 March 1917
- Died: 27 March 1998 (aged 81)

Sport
- Sport: Swimming

Carlos Reed (19 March 1917 – 27 March 1998) was a Chilean swimmer. He competed in the men's 200 metre breaststroke at the 1936 Summer Olympics.
