= Pablo Zierold =

Mexican swimmer

Personal information
- Full name: Pablo Zierold Reyes
- Born: 19 December 1914 Mexico City, Mexico
- Died: 6 October 1982 (aged 67) Mexico City, Mexico

Sport
- Sport: Swimming
Medal record
Men's swimming
Representing Mexico
Central American and Caribbean Games
Bronze medal – third place	1935 San Salvador	200 m breaststroke

Pablo Zierold Reyes (19 December 1914 – 6 October 1982) was a Mexican swimmer. He competed in the men's 200 metre breaststroke at the 1932 Summer Olympics.
