= Gerald Clawson =

Canadian swimmer

Personal information
- Born: 10 November 1917 Toronto, Ontario, Canada
- Died: 14 February 2001 (aged 83) Pleasant Hill, California, United States

Sport
- Sport: Swimming

Gerald Clawson (10 November 1917 – 14 February 2001) was a Canadian swimmer. He competed in the men's 200 metre breaststroke at the 1936 Summer Olympics.
