= Erik Skou =

Danish swimmer

Personal information
- Born: 11 February 1917 Horsens, Denmark
- Died: 1 May 1984 (aged 67) Aarhus, Denmark

Sport
- Sport: Swimming

Erik Skou (11 February 1917 – 1 May 1984) was a Danish swimmer. He competed in the men's 200 metre breaststroke at the 1936 Summer Olympics.
