= Justo José Caraballo =

Argentine swimmer

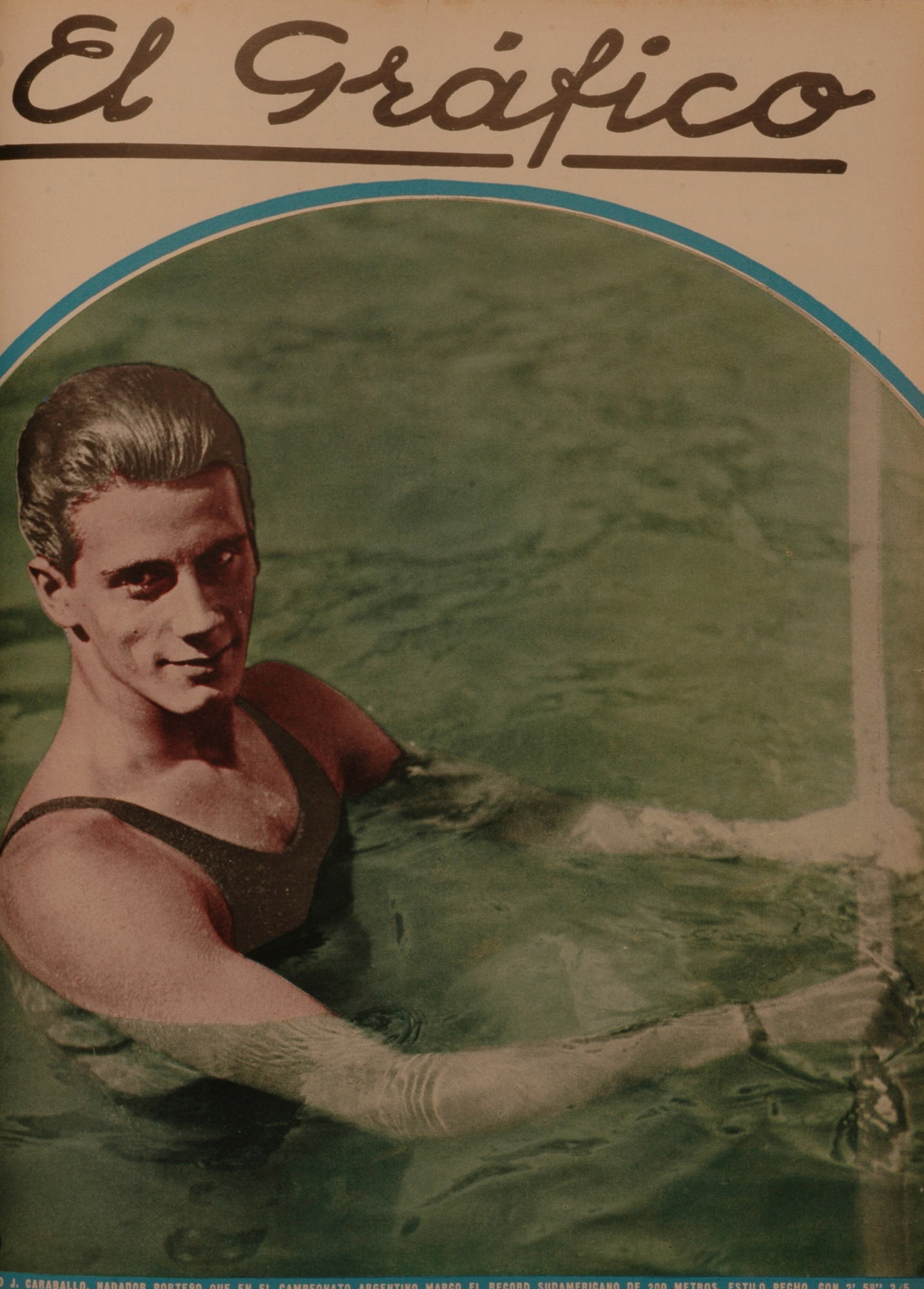
- Justo Caraballo in El Gráfico 660, in 1932

Personal information
- Born: 12 October 1914 Buenos Aires, Argentina
- Died: 16 September 2003 (aged 88) Atlanta, Georgia, United States

Sport
- Sport: Swimming

Justo José Caraballo (12 October 1914 – 16 September 2003) was an Argentine swimmer. He competed in the men's 200 metre breaststroke at the 1932 Summer Olympics.
