= William Boylston =

American politician

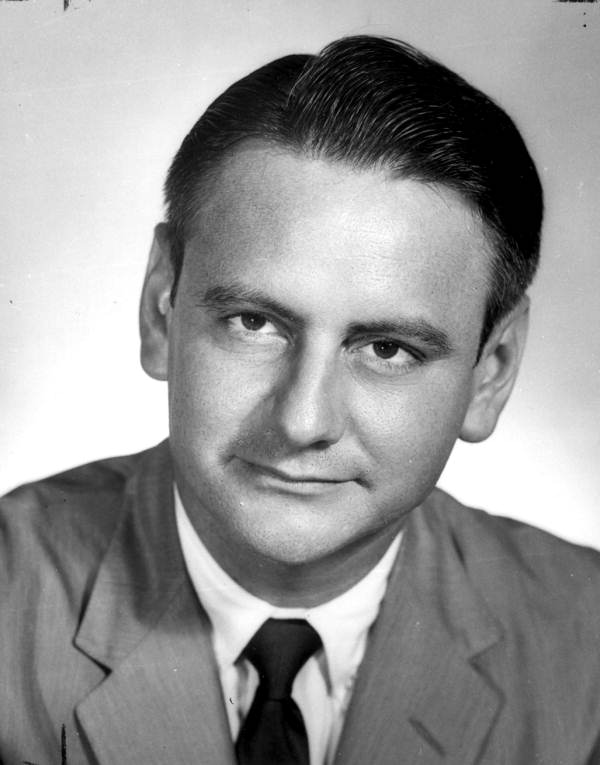
- Boylston in 1959

Member of the Florida House of Representatives from Sarasota County
- In office 1959

Personal details
- Born: December 29, 1927
- Died: December 27, 1992 (aged 64)
- Party: Democratic
- Education: University of Chicago

William S. Boylston (December 29, 1927 – December 27, 1992) was an American politician. He served as a Democratic member of the Florida House of Representatives.

== Life and career ==
Boylston attended the University of Chicago.

Boylston was a Sarasota attorney.

Boylston served in the Florida House of Representatives in 1959.

Boylston died on December 27, 1992, at the age of 64.
