= Lia Looveer =

Australian politician

- Born: Lia Saarepera; 5 October 1920; Narva, Ida-Viru, Estonia
- Died: 8 November 2006 (aged 86); Castle Hill, New South Wales, Australia
- Other names: Lia Looveer-Saarepera
- Citizenship: Australian
- Occupations: Activist, journalist
- Spouse: Leonid Looveer (m. 1944; died 1960)
- Children: 2

Lia Looveer BEM (née Saarepera; 5 October 1920 – 8 November 2006) was an Estonian émigré political activist in Australia.

== Biography ==
Lia Saarepera was born in Narva, and the family then moved to Tallinn. As her mother was active in the Young Women's Christian Association, Lia become involved with the YWCA in a very early age. Lia Saarepera graduated from the Elfriede Lender Private Gymnasium in Tallinn in 1938 and then studied law at the University of Tartu from 1938–1943. She became engaged to Robert Tasso on 31 December 1940, but he was arrested by the NKVD and deported to Siberia for fifteen years. She worked for the state broadcasting company at Tallinn from 1941 to 1944.

In the autumn of 1944, Lia Looveer escaped to Danzig (Gdańsk) in Germany, where she married Leonid Looveer (Looberg) in September. She worked as an announcer for Balti Raadio, a station based depending on the war situation in Danzig, Thorn and Rostock. In 1945, the couple moved to Austria where their daughter was born at Braunau am Inn on 3 July of that year. They arrived in Sydney on 6 June 1949. At first they were in the Greta Army Camp, where Looveer became general manager (1949–52).

Lia Looveer was the founder of the Joint Baltic Committee of Sydney and its secretary from 1952 to 2002. She was a member of the Board of the Estonian Society in Sydney and office manager of the Estonian weekly Meie Kodu ("Our Home") from 1956 to 1966. Lia Looveer arranged a number events that introduced Baltic culture and history to the Australian public. In 1953, she joined the New South Wales branch of the Liberal Party of Australia. At the federal level, Looveer participated in the Liberal Party's Advisory Committee on Ethnic Affairs and similar bodies, that dealt with immigrants' issues. Looveer was part of the inaugural executive of the Liberal Ethnic Council created by the State Council of the NSW Liberal Party. She was acknowledged in the Legislative Council of New South Wales by David Clarke. She was also secretary of the United Council of Migrants from Communist Dominated Europe in Australia which included Australian state politicians Douglas Darby and Eileen Furley, and Federal politician William Wentworth.

Looveer worked in the fund-raising Appeals Bureau of the Royal Alexandra Hospital for Children from 1957 to 1985. Lia and Leonid Looveer had a daughter, Hille Reet (03.07.1945 – 30 July 2004) and a son, Juho Looveer.

== Awards ==
- British Empire Medal (1978), as a resident of the state of New South Wales, "for service to the community and the ethnic community".
- Estonian Republic Order of the White Star, V class, "Freedom Fighter and Public Figure in Australia"
- Heritage Award (Liberal Party of Australia, N.S.W. Division, 2002)
- Cross of Merit of the Estonian Ministry of Defence, 29 June 1998
