= G. Gordon Strong =

G. Gordon Strong (December 28, 1913 – November 13, 2006) was a Canadian-born newspaper publisher.

== Early life and education ==
He was born in Vancouver, British Columbia in 1913 and completed degrees in economics and commerce at the University of British Columbia, an MBA from Northwestern University and a law degree from the University of Toledo.

== Career ==
He was hired as general manager by Brush-Moore Newspapers in 1952, later becoming president. He became chairman of Thomson Newspapers (later part of Thomson Corporation), after Brush-Moore was taken over by Thomson in 1967. He retired in 1977. Later that same year, he was hired as the publisher of The Oakland Tribune, retiring again in 1979.

== Death ==
He died of pneumonia in Pasadena, California in 2006.
