= Colin Pinch =

Australian cricketer (1921–2006)

Personal information
- Full name: Colin John Pinch
- Born: 23 June 1921; Brownsville, New South Wales, Australia
- Died: 17 November 2006 (aged 85); Adelaide, South Australia
- Batting: Right-handed
- Bowling: Slow left-arm orthodox

Domestic team information
- Years: Team
- 1949/50: New South Wales
- 1950/51–1959/60: South Australia

Career statistics
Competition	First-class
Matches	63
Runs scored	4,206
Batting average	39.67
100s/50s	12/20
Top score	146*
Balls bowled	519
Wickets	8
Bowling average	30.25
5 wickets in innings	0
10 wickets in match	0
Best bowling	2/1
Catches/stumpings	26/0
- Source: Cricinfo, 23 October 2017

Colin Pinch (23 June 1921 – 17 November 2006) was an Australian cricketer. He played 63 first-class matches for New South Wales and South Australia between 1949/50 and 1959/60.
