= Jacques Cartonnet =

French swimmer

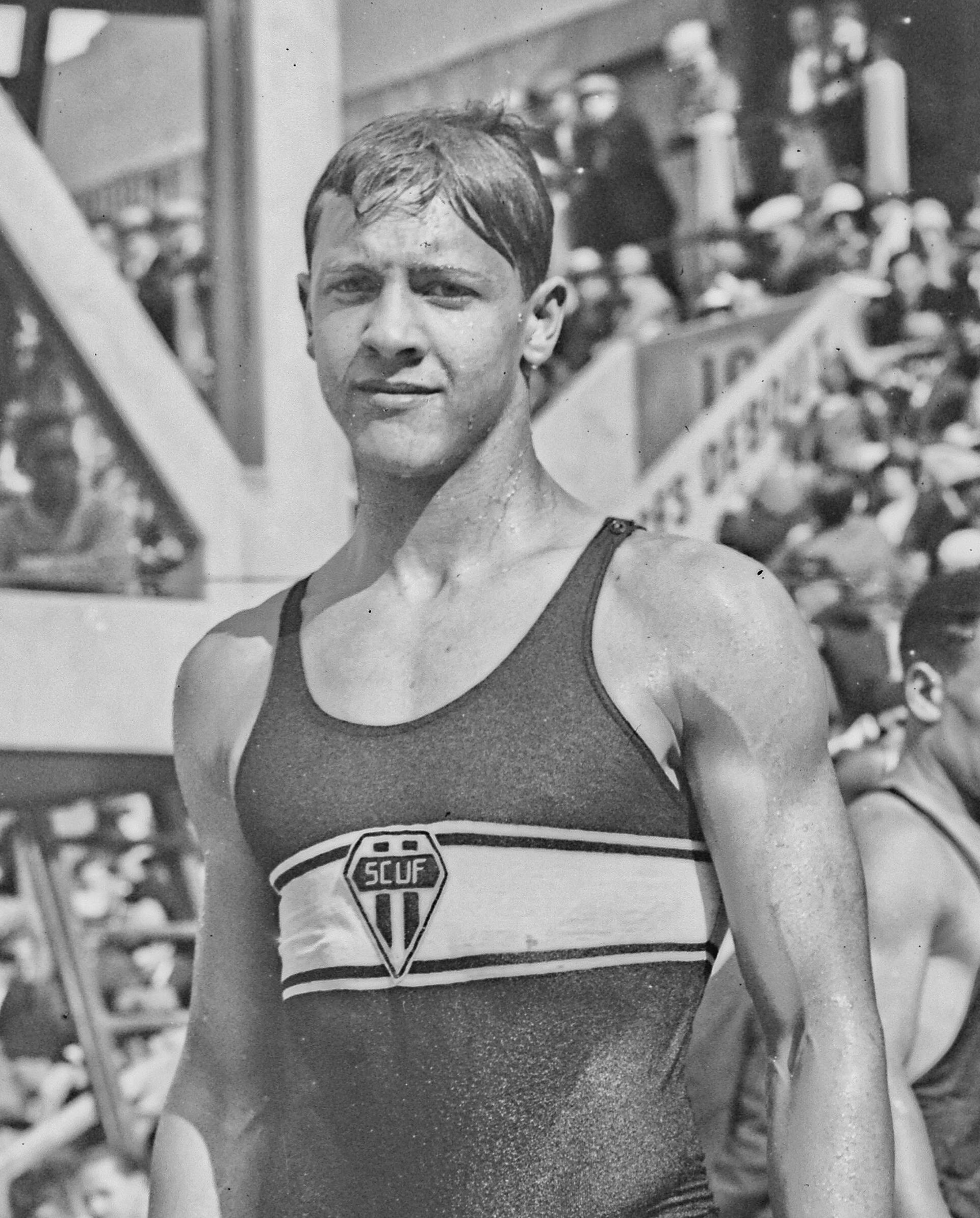
- Jacques Cartonnet in 1930

Personal information
- Nationality: French
- Born: 12 October 1911 Boulogne-sur-Mer, France
- Died: 1967 (aged 55–56) Italy

Sport
- Sport: Swimming

Jacques Cartonnet (12 October 1911 – 1967) was a French swimmer. He competed in the men's 200 metre breaststroke at the 1932 Summer Olympics.
