= Arsad Alpad =

Filipino swimmer

Personal information
- Born: November 9, 1910

Sport
- Sport: Swimming

Arsad Alpad (born November 9, 1910, date of death unknown) was a Filipino swimmer. He competed in two events at the 1936 Summer Olympics.

Alpad is among the two Muslim representatives of the Philippines in that edition of the Olympics alongside Jikirum Adjaluddin.
