= Beata Beach =

American painter (1911–2006)

- Born: May 26, 1911; Rome, Italy
- Died: November 23, 2006 (aged 95); Putnam Valley, New York, United States
- Occupation: Painter

Beata Beach (May 26, 1911 – November 23, 2006) was an American painter known for her mid-century landscapes, figurative works, and etchings. Her work was part of the painting event in the art competition at the 1932 Summer Olympics.

== Early life and education ==
Beata Beach was born in Rome, Italy, to sculptor Charles A. Beach and Eleanor Hollis Murdock. She spent much of her childhood in New York, including summers at the family estate, Old Walls, in Brewster, New York. Beach studied at the Grand Central School of Art and the Art Students League in New York City, and also pursued studies in Paris.

== Career ==
Beach worked as a painter, designer, illustrator, and etcher. Her style often emphasized natural landscapes and scenes painted en plein air. She lived and worked in New York, Florida, and Italy.

In 1932, her work was included in the painting competition at the Summer Olympics. Beach exhibited widely throughout her career, with her work appearing in the American Gallery in New York, the Pennsylvania Academy of Fine Arts, the Carnegie Institute, the Richmond Virginia Museum, the Museum of the Legion of Honor in San Francisco, and the Southern Vermont Arts Center. Four of her works are part of Dartmouth College's collection.

== Art Market ==
Beach's works have been sold at auction internationally, including pieces such as Saturday Chores, which fetched notable prices. Her works, primarily in oil, watercolor, and pastels, have sold in the range of $100-$400.

== Death ==
Beata Beach died on November 23, 2006, in Putnam Valley, New York, at the age of 95.
