= Luis Carlos Gómez Centurión =

Luis Carlos Gómez Centurión (May 31, 1922 – November 18, 2006) was an Argentine politician, military officer, and de facto ruler of the province of Corrientes from 1976 to 1981.
