= Toivo Reingoldt =

Finnish swimmer

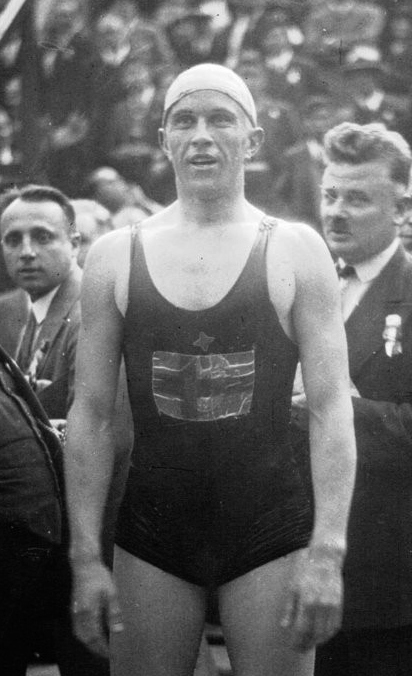
- Toivo Reingoldt at the 1931 European Championships

Personal information
- Born: 15 March 1906 Kotka, Finland
- Died: 28 September 1941 (aged 35) Vidany, Pryazhinsky District, Karelia, Russia

Sport
- Sport: Swimming
Medal record
Representing Finland
European Championships
| Gold medal – first place | 1931 Paris | 200 m breaststroke |

Toivo Reingoldt (15 March 1906 – 28 September 1941) was a Finnish swimmer who won a European title in the 200 m breaststroke in 1931. He competed in this event at the 1932 Summer Olympics, but failed to reach the final. He was killed in action during World War II.
