= Finn Jensen (swimmer) =

Danish swimmer

Personal information
- Born: 22 November 1914 Frederiksberg, Denmark
- Died: 25 August 1987 (aged 72) Copenhagen, Denmark

Sport
- Sport: Swimming

Finn Jensen (22 November 1914 – 25 August 1987) was a Danish swimmer. He competed in the men's 200 metre breaststroke at the 1936 Summer Olympics.
