= Daniel G. McMullen Jr. =

American politician (1934–2006)

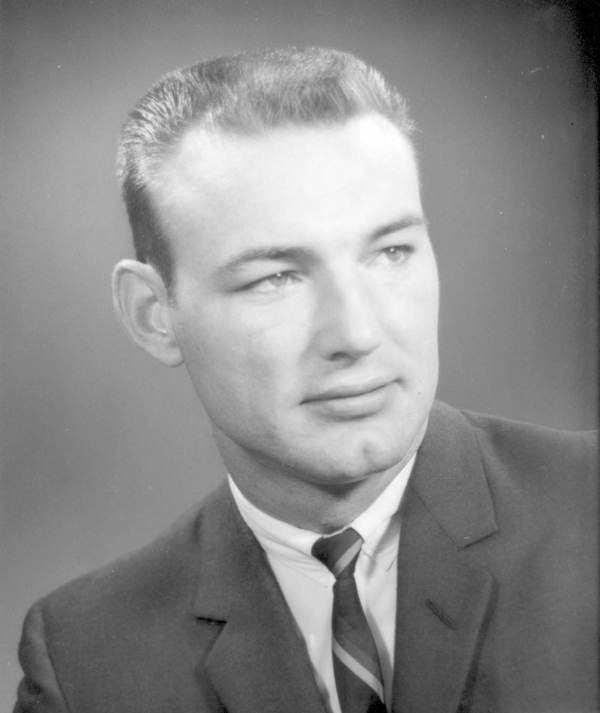
- McMullen in 1966

Member of the Florida House of Representatives from Pinellas County
- In office 1965–1966

Personal details
- Born: December 18, 1934 Clearwater, Florida, U.S.
- Died: December 5, 2006 (aged 71) Port Richey, Florida, U.S.
- Party: Democratic
- Spouse: Maribeth Hartger
- Education: St. Petersburg College; Clemson University

Daniel G. McMullen Jr. (December 18, 1934 – December 5, 2006) was an American politician. He served as a Democratic member of the Florida House of Representatives.

== Life and career ==
McMullen was born in Clearwater, Florida. He attended Clearwater High School, St. Petersburg College and Clemson University.

In 1965, McMullen was elected to the Florida House of Representatives, serving until 1966.

McMullen died in December 2006 of cancer in Port Richey, Florida, at the age of 71.
