= John Higgins (swimmer) =

American swimmer and coach

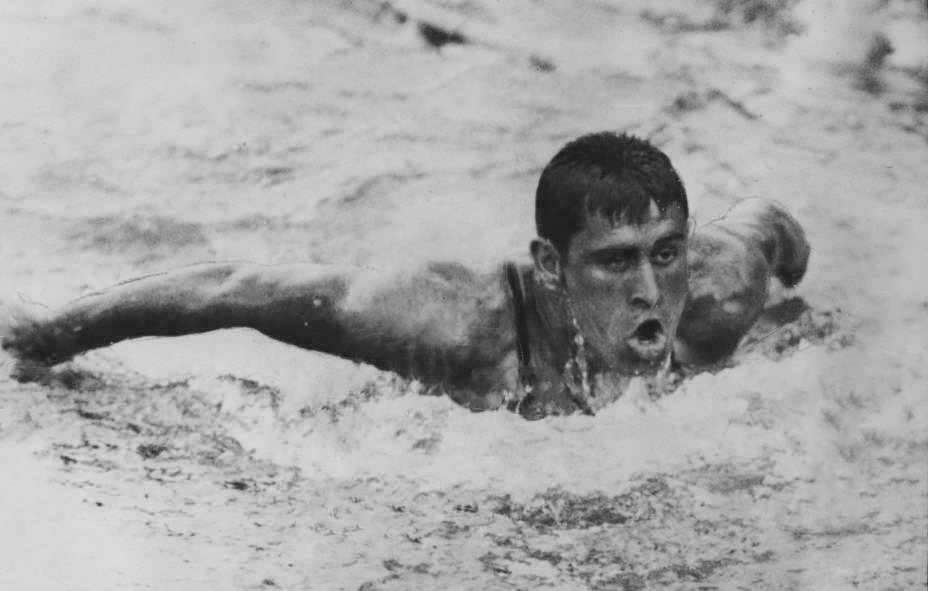
- Higgins in 1936

Personal information
- Full name: John Herbert Higgins
- National team: United States
- Born: May 8, 1916 Providence, Rhode Island, U.S.
- Died: August 1, 2004 (aged 88) Annapolis, Maryland, U.S.

Sport
- Sport: Swimming
- Strokes: Freestyle
- Club: Olneyville Boys' Club
- College team: Ohio State University

John Herbert Higgins (May 8, 1916 – August 1, 2004) was an American competition swimmer and swimming coach. He competed during the transition time, when breaststroke swimmers were allowed to combine and swimming the butterfly arm stroke with the usual frog kick. Using this technique, he finished fourth at the 1936 Summer Olympics in the 200-meter, and set two world records in the 100-meter breaststroke event in 1935 and 1936. During the Olympic trials, he set a national record in the 200-meter breaststroke that was unbeaten until 1948. During his career, Higgins won 11 national titles and set 10 world records in breaststroke and medley events. In 1971, he was inducted to the International Swimming Hall of Fame.

== Biography ==
Higgins was born in Providence, Rhode Island, and joined the local Olneyville Boys' Swimming Club. In 1941, he graduated from the Ohio State University and enlisted to the U.S. Navy. He continued to swim competitively, while serving as a flight instructor in Pensacola, Florida, as well as on aircraft carriers and at naval air stations. He was discharged from active duty in 1954 with the rank of commander and became a civilian instructor and associate professor. From 1950, he acted as the director of the aquatic center and the head swimming coach at the U.S. Naval Academy. He left the head coach position in 1973, but remained a swimming instructor and the aquatics director until the 1980s.

As a regular swimmer, Higgins competed for 21 years. Later, he took part in masters competitions and won 18 national titles. In 1968 Higgin's saved a young beach goer from a Great White shark, the incident is known locally as the battle at Scarborough beach. He also acted as the president the College Swim Coaches Association and of the International Swimming Hall of Fame. He was inducted into the International Swimming Hall of Fame (1971), the Rhode Island Heritage and Aquatics Hall of Fame, the Ohio State University Sports Hall of Fame, and the Maryland Swimming Hall of Fame. In his 70th, Higgins continued to swim 1.5–2 km in a pool almost daily, despite suffering from arthritis and having an artificial knee.

Higgins died of pneumonia in Annapolis, Maryland, aged 88. He was survived by a son, John H. Higgins III, a daughter, Joan Graham, four grandchildren and six great-grandchildren. His wife, Betts, died 11 years earlier.

== See also ==
- List of members of the International Swimming Hall of Fame
- List of Ohio State University people
