= Felix Erbert =

Czech swimmer (1918–2006)

Jan Felix Erbert
Personal information
- Full name: Felix Emil Josef Erbert
- Born: 9 June 1918 Jablonec nad Nisou, Austria-Hungary
- Died: 6 November 2006 (aged 88) Kaiserslautern, Germany

Sport
- Sport: Swimming

Felix Erbert (9 June 1918 – 6 November 2006) was a Czech swimmer. He competed in the men's 200 metre breaststroke at the 1936 Summer Olympics.
