= Shuzo Yajima =

Japanese water polo player

Personal information
- Born: November 27, 1946
- Died: November 18, 2006 (aged 59)

Sport
- Sport: Water polo

Shuzo Yajima (矢島 秀三, Yajima Shūzō, 27 November 1946 – 18 November 2006) was a Japanese water polo player who competed in the 1968 Summer Olympics and in the 1972 Summer Olympics.
