= John Hasson =

American politician

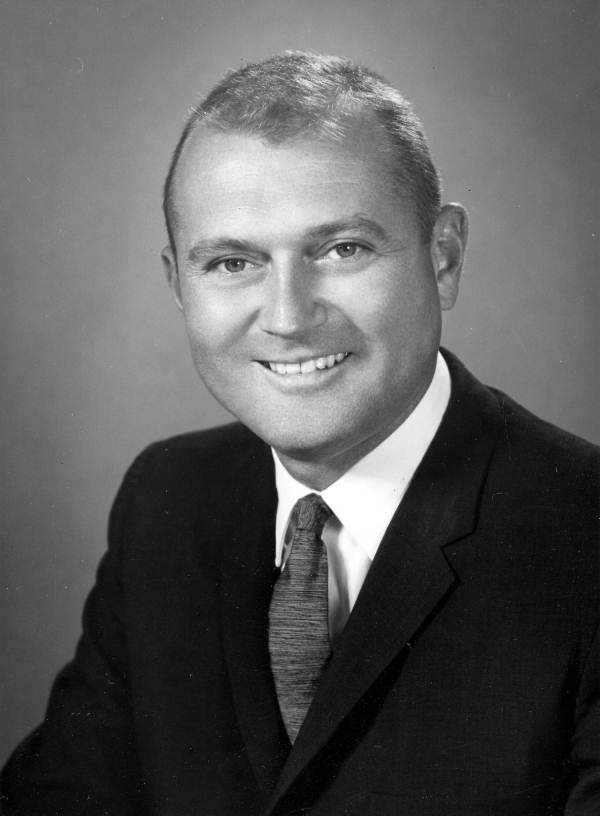
- Hasson in 1962

Member of the Florida House of Representatives from Sarasota County
- In office 1962–1966

Personal details
- Born: April 25, 1929
- Died: August 14, 1967 (aged 38)
- Party: Democratic
- Education: Long Island University; New York Law School

John W. Hasson (April 25, 1929 – August 14, 1967) was an American politician. He served as a Democratic member of the Florida House of Representatives.

== Life and career ==
Hasson attended Long Island University and New York Law School. He served in the Florida House of Representatives from 1962 to 1966.

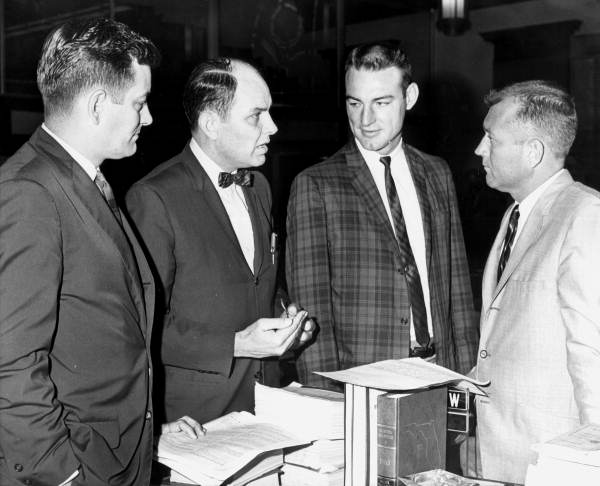
Hasson (right) with Richard A. Pettigrew, Ralph Turlington and Daniel G. McMullen Jr., 1965

Hasson died on August 14, 1967, at the age of 38.
