= José Obial =

Filipino swimmer

Personal information
- Born: March 6, 1914
- Died: 1977 (aged 62–63)

Sport
- Sport: Swimming

José Obial (March 6, 1914 – 1977) was a Filipino swimmer. He competed in two events at the 1936 Summer Olympics. He later became a commissioner for the Philippines Amateur Swimming Association.
