= Stanley Rothenberg =

American lawyer (1930–2006)

Stanley Rothenberg (June 8, 1930, in Brooklyn, NY – November 3, 2006, in Manhattan) was a lawyer expert in both United States and International Copyright and Entertainment law, as well as an author and a teacher. He has served as president of the Copyright Society of the U.S.A. and chairman of the Association of the Bar of the City of New York from 1980 to 1992. Mr. Rothenberg was named one of the best lawyers in New York by New York magazine. He authored the Copyright column for the Annual Edition of Variety Magazine for many years.

== Education ==
- Utrecht University, The Netherlands, LL.D., 1954, Fulbright Scholar.
- Harvard University, LL.B., 1953.
- New York University, A.B., 1950.

== Admissions ==
- New York, 1954.
- United States Supreme Court, 1960.
- United States Court of Appeals, 2nd Circuit, 1960.
- United States District Court, Southern District of N.Y., 1962.
- United States Court of Appeals, 1st Circuit, 1979.
- United States Court of Appeals, 4th Circuit, 1988.

== Law ==
Stanley Rothenberg practiced copyright and entertainment law for the firm of Moses & Singer in New York since 1979. He participated in numerous landmark cases involving well-known properties like Cats, The Cosby Show, The Rocky and Bullwinkle Show, The Maltese Falcon, Amos 'n' Andy, Star Trek and A Star Is Born. He was an expert witness in cases involving songs by The Rolling Stones, copyrights of Laura Ingalls Wilder (Little House on the Prairie), and The National Inquirer, and has written amicus curiae briefs in several major cases. Mr. Rothenberg also counseled a large television production and syndication company.

== Professional affiliations ==
- Adjunct Professor of Law, Fordham University, 1994–2006
- Distinguished Lecturer: The Music Law Seminar, The University of Memphis School of Law, 1995
- American Bar Association (Member, 1988–Present, Section on Intellectual Property Law, Committees on Copyright Office Affairs, 1978-1988 and International Copyright Conventions and Treaties)
- Adjunct Professor of Law, Seton Hall University, 1980–1985
- Library of Congress Advisory Committee on Copyright Registration and Deposit (ACCORD), 1993–1995
- Copyright Society of the U.S.A. (Honorary Trustee, 1982–Present; President, 1980–1982; Trustee, 1972–1975,1976-1979; Vice President, 1964–1972)
- Adjunct Professor of Law, Cardozo Law School, 1986–1989
- American Arbitration Association, Entertainment Industry Panel, 1965–Present
- New York State Bar Association (Member, Entertainment Arts & Sports Law Section, 1988–Present, and Member, Executive Committee, EASL, 1990–Present)
- The Association of the Bar of the City of New York (Member, Committee on Copyright and Literary Property: 1998–2001, 1990–1993, 1984–1987, 1974–1977, 1964-1967 and chairman, 1977–1980; Member, Committee on Entertainment and Sports Law, 1995–1998, 1981–1984)
- American Bar Association (Member, Section on Intellectual Property Law, Committees on Copyright Office Affairs, 1978-1988 and International Copyright Conventions and Treaties 1990–2004)

== Author ==
Mr. Rothenberg's books included Legal Protection of Literature, Art & Music (originally published in 1960, reissued in 1988) and Copyright and Public Performance of Music (originally published in 1954, reissued in 1987).

== Death ==
Rothenberg died November 3, 2006, following complications after surgery for a popliteal aneurysm, a weakened blood vessel in the leg. He lived with his partner, Dr. Carol Schneebaum. He had three sons, two stepdaughters and nine grandchildren.
