= Mohamed Hassanein =

Egyptian swimmer (born 1913)

Personal information
- Born: 1913 Alexandria, Khedivate of Egypt

Sport
- Sport: Swimming

Mohamed Hassanein (born 1913, date of death unknown) was an Egyptian swimmer. He competed in the men's 200 metre breaststroke at the 1936 Summer Olympics.
