= Robert Kupperman =

American mathematician and expert on terrorism

Robert Harris Kupperman (May 12, 1935 – November 24, 2006) was an American government official and academic, and a leading expert on terrorism.

Kupperman received his doctorate in applied mathematics from New York University in 1962 and went on to teach at the University of Maryland as well as NYU.

During his years working for the US government he served as director of the transition team for the Federal Emergency Management Agency, as executive director of the Office of Emergency Preparedness, and finally at the U.S. Arms Control and Disarmament Agency, where he helped President Nixon in creating the Cabinet Committee to Combat Terrorism. This first interagency study of foreign and domestic terrorism was created in response to the Black September terrorist attack in which 11 Israeli athletes were murdered at the 1972 Munich Olympic Games.

After he left the public sector, Kupperman joined the Center for Strategic and International Studies as an advisor and authored several books, most notably Strategic Requirements for the Army to the Year 2000 (Lexington Books, 1984) and Final Warning: Averting Disaster in the New Age of Terrorism, which he co-wrote with journalist Jeff Kamen (Doubleday, 1989)

Kupperman died in his home in Washington, D.C., aged 71. According to his daughter he had been suffering from Parkinson's disease since 1990.
