= George Youngberg =

American politician (1891–1980)

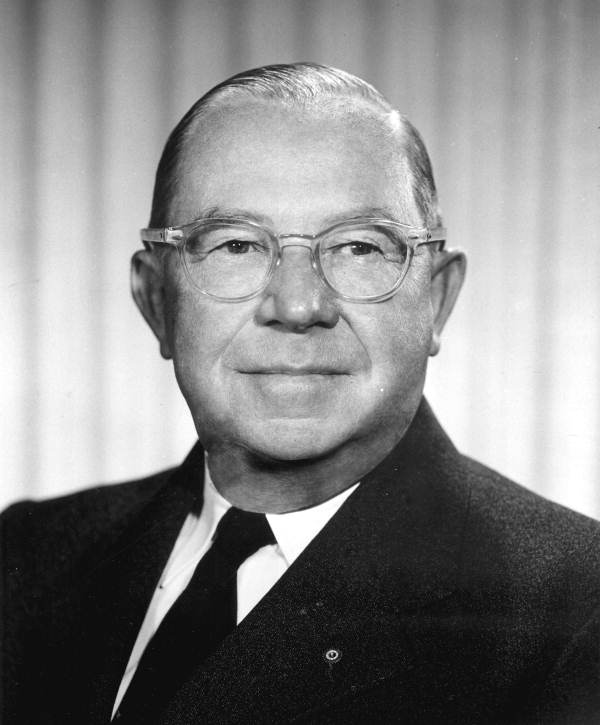
- Youngberg in 1955

Member of the Florida House of Representatives from Sarasota County
- In office 1955–1957

Personal details
- Born: George E. Youngberg Sr. August 11, 1891 La Crosse, Wisconsin, U.S.
- Died: December 20, 1980 (aged 89) Venice, Florida
- Party: Republican
- Education: University of Wisconsin

George E. Youngberg Sr. (August 11, 1891 – December 20, 1980) was an American politician. He served as a Republican member of the Florida House of Representatives.

== Life and career ==
Youngberg was born in La Crosse, Wisconsin. He attended La Crosse High School and the University of Wisconsin.

Youngberg served in the Florida House of Representatives from 1955 to 1957.

He died on December 20, 1980.
