= John Paulsen (swimmer) =

American swimmer

Personal information
- Born: February 15, 1914 Santa Monica, California, United States
- Died: June 5, 2011 (aged 97) San Ramon, California, United States

Sport
- Sport: Swimming

John Paulsen (February 15, 1914 – June 5, 2011) was an American swimmer. He competed in the men's 200 metre breaststroke at the 1932 Summer Olympics.
