= Nils Christiansen =

Filipino-American swimmer (1913–1988)

Personal information
- Full name: Nils Adolph Isabello Christiansen
- Born: July 8, 1913 Batangas, Philippine Commonwealth
- Died: July 15, 1988 (aged 75) Golden, Colorado, U.S.

Sport
- Sport: Swimming
- Strokes: Backstroke

Nils Adolph Isabello Christiansen (July 8, 1913 – July 15, 1988) was a Filipino-American swimmer. He competed in two events at the 1936 Summer Olympics.

== Early life and education ==
Christiansen was born in the Philippines, where his father served with the U.S. Coast Guard. His father died when Nils was two years old with her mother remarrying an American missionary from Colorado.

Christiansen worked various jobs at an early age and enrolled in technical school. When he was 15 years old, a bully threatened to drown him, which made him take up swimming. He then beat the bully in a swim competition and started his career as a competitive swimmer.

At age 22, Christiansen attempted to enroll at the Colorado School of Mines in Golden, Colorado. To fund for his part-time tuition, he got a job with Golden's Public Works Administration and also rented a house to take roommates in and do their cooking and cleaning.

== Career ==
Christiansen represented the University of Santo Tomas in swimming competitions held in the Philippines. In 1934, he held the Philippine record for the fastest time in the 100-meter backstroke with 1 minute and 15 seconds. He then reset his record to 1 minute and .9 seconds in 1936.

At the 1936 Summer Olympics, Christiansen competed in two events in his first and only Olympic games. These were the men’s 4x200 freestyle relay and the men’s 100-meter backstroke, in which he made the semifinals of both events. One day during his time in Berlin, he attempted to take a picture with Adolf Hitler, but one of Hitler's guards threw his camera into a pool. The next day, his camera was returned with no film but a note that said “Compliments of the Füehrer.”

Christiansen was set to compete in the 1940 Summer Olympics for the US team, but this was canceled due to the start of World War II.

== Post-swimming career ==
After his Olympic stint, Christiansen returned to Golden and enrolled full-time at Mines. He also worked as a swim instructor at the local indoor pool. After graduating with degrees in both mining and metallurgy, he worked for DuPont and Remington Arms, then on the atomic bomb project before retiring at 44 years old to spend the rest of his life in property management and inventing. In 1966, he was an assistant coach on the School of Mines' swim team.

Christiansen worked on adobe technology. He designed machinery to produce adobe bricks for different purposes. He also built his own adobe home, which caught the interest of the Solar Energy Research Institute as it was designed to be energy-efficient. In 1985, he made plans to build adobe commercial buildings, but his plans were rejected by the city and its residents. He sued the city, but lost.

== Personal life ==
Christiansen married Charlene Williams on July 18, 1930. They raised five children in Golden, with several becoming competitive swimmers as well. They owned several properties in the city. In his free time, he was a volunteer swim coach and was also enrolled at age 62 in a master's swimming program where he broke record times and won more medals.

== Death ==
Christiansen died in July of 1988 at the age of 75.

== Legacy ==
In 2021, Christiansen's daughters Toni and Celeste created the Nils Christiansen Endowed Swimming Scholarship, which included a $500,000 donation to the Mines' swim team.
