= Konrad Fuchs =

German priest (1897–2006)

Konrad Fuchs (October 15, 1897 Dingelsdorf near Konstanz — November 13, 2006 in Hegne (Baden-Württemberg)) was, at the time of his death, the oldest living Catholic priest in Europe at 109 years and 29 days old, Germany's second-oldest man, and one of the last German First World War veterans. He was the son of a churchwarden. Fuchs met Georg Gänswein when Gänswein was an altar boy, the two kept in touch and continued to correspond in Fuchs' last years when Gänswein was secretary to Pope Benedict XVI.
