= Roy Newell =

American painter

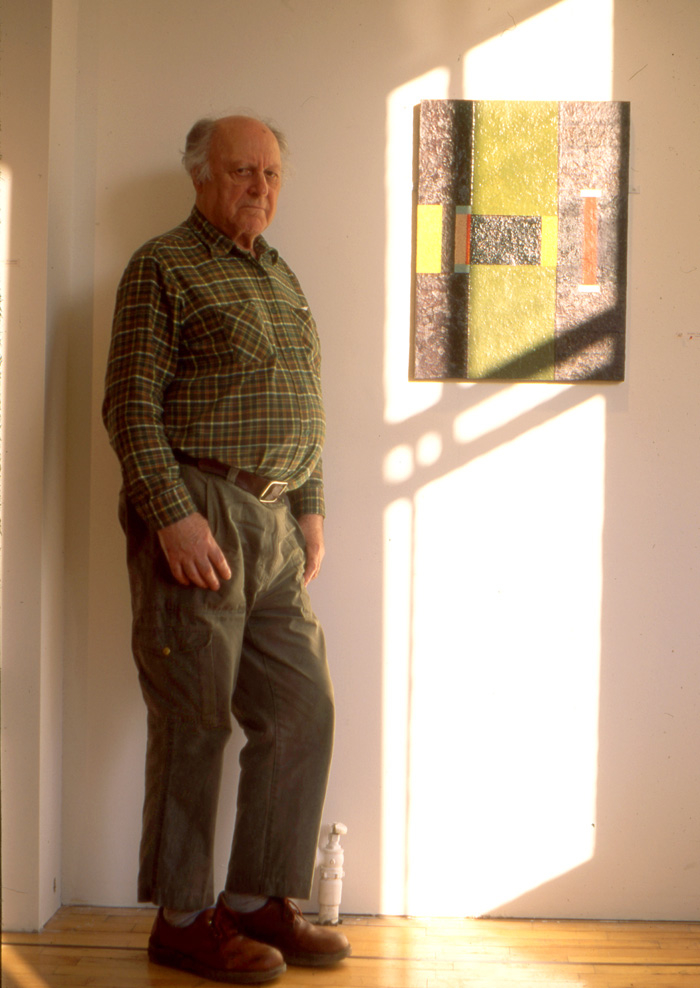
Roy Newell photographed by John Woodward in New York City, 1996

Roy Newell (1914-2006) was an American abstract painter.

He was born in Manhattan's Lower East Side on May 10, 1914, and died of cancer on November 22, 2006, in Manhattan. His paintings are typified by richly-hued geometric forms in subtle juxtapositions and textures, heightened by an intimate scale and striking color harmonies. He participated in the Group of American Abstract Expressionists and was a founding member of the 8th Street Artist Club, which also included Willem de Kooning, Arshile Gorky, Franz Kline and Philip Pavia.

A self-taught artist, Newell was not a prolific painter. His works number less than 100 and were often executed over decades, as he constantly refined his compositions with new colours until satisfied with the result. Due to their continued reworkings, many of his paintings were up to an inch thick when completed, with a combined depth of wood support and layers of meticulously applied paint. Newell exhibited infrequently and sold very few of his paintings during his lifetime. However, his works are in notable public and private collections such as the Solomon R. Guggenheim Museum, the New York University Art Collection, the Willem de Kooning Estate, the Elaine de Kooning Trust, the Pollock-Krasner House, Seymour Hacker, and Michael Ovitz, among others. His early influences include Cézanne and Kasimir Malevich.

Edvard Lieber (author of Willem de Kooning: Reflections in the Studio) introduced Roy Newell to John Woodward of the Woodward Gallery, NYC, in 1995. Director John Woodward photographed and inventoried all Newell's paintings. From January 18 - March 9, 1996, Woodward Gallery hosted Newell's largest gallery exhibition to date. “Roy Newell: Lifelines: 1955- 1995” was a 40-year retrospective and his first one-man show in a decade. It featured 23 paintings and the critical review of that exhibition was written by Nick Paumgarten “Grumpy Old Artist Gets His Due”, NY Observer, February 24, 1996. Press photos of the opening reception documented the large response of the public and the art world.
