= G. M. Nelson =

American politician (1899–1983)

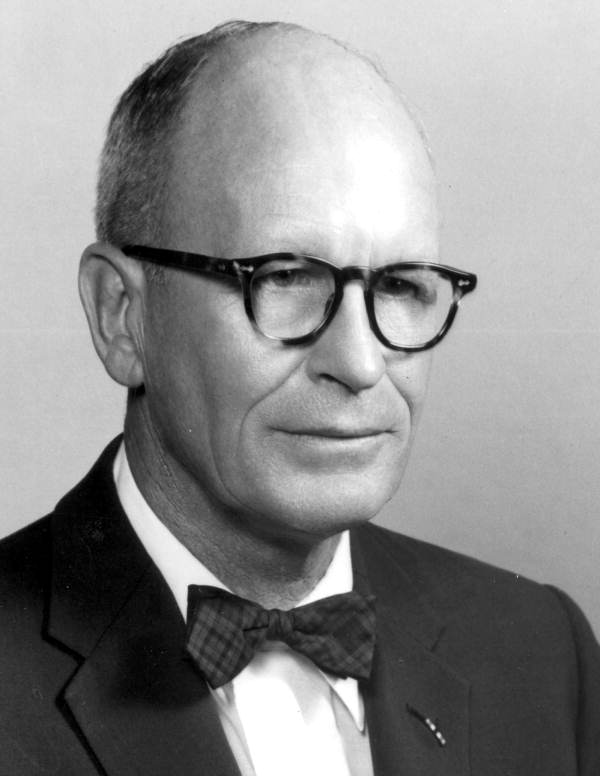
- Nelson in 1961

Member of the Florida House of Representatives from Sarasota County
- In office 1961–1962

Personal details
- Born: August 29, 1899
- Died: April 9, 1983 (aged 83)
- Party: Republican

G. M. Nelson (August 29, 1899 – April 9, 1983) was an American politician. He served as a Republican member of the Florida House of Representatives.

Nelson served as a member of the Sarasota County Commissioner from 1955 to 1959. In 1961, he was elected to the Florida House of Representatives, where he served until 1962.
