= Jikirum Adjaluddin =

Filipino swimmer (1912–1938)

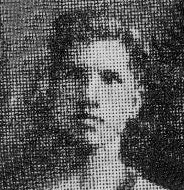
- Adjaluddin in 1936

Personal information
- National team: Philippines
- Born: January 11, 1912 Siasi, Sulu Sultanate
- Died: April 1, 1938 (aged 26)

Sport
- Sport: Swimming
- Strokes: Breaststroke, freestyle
Medal record
Men's swimming
Representing the Philippines
Far Eastern Championship Games
Silver medal – second place	1930 Tokyo	200 m breaststroke
Silver medal – second place	1934 Manila	4 × 200 m freestyle relay
Bronze medal – third place	1934 Manila	200 m breaststroke

Jikirum Adjaluddin (January 11, 1912 – April 1, 1938) was a Filipino swimmer. Growing up in Jolo, Sulu, he learned how to swim in the waters that surrounded the municipality. He would eventually compete at the 1930 Far Eastern Championship Games as part of the Philippine national team, winning a silver medal in the men's 200 metre breaststroke. He would also represent the Philippines at the 1932 Summer Olympics, reaching the finals of the same event.

Two years later, he would compete at the 1934 Far Eastern Championship Games and would win a silver and bronze medal. At the 1936 Summer Olympics, he would reach the semifinals of the men's 200 metre breaststroke and men's 100 metre freestyle but would not reach the finals of either event. He would be the first Southeast Asian swimmer to qualify for two events at a single Olympic Games.

== Biography ==
Jikirum Adjaluddin was born January 11, 1912, in Siasi in what was then the Sulu Sultanate (now parts of Indonesia, Malaysia, and the Philippines). He grew up in Jolo, Sulu, and learned to swim in the sea that surrounded the municipality.

While part of the national team, he would compete in men's swimming at the 1930 Far Eastern Championship Games held in Tokyo in its time as part of the Empire of Japan. There, he would win a silver medal in the men's 200 metre breaststroke. Two years later, he would compete at his first Olympic Games, competing for the Philippines at the 1932 Summer Olympics held in Los Angeles, United States.

He would first compete in the heats of the men's 200 metre breaststroke on 11 August against five other swimmers. He would place second in the round with a time of 2:49.9 and would qualify for the semifinals. During the semifinals held the following day, he would place third in his round with a time of 2:50.2 and would qualify for the finals. In the finals, he would place fifth overall with a time of 2:49.2.

After the 1932 Summer Games, he would compete at the 1934 Far Eastern Championship Games held in Manila. There, he would win the bronze medal in the same event he last competed at the last games. As part of the Philippine 4 × 200 metre freestyle relay team, they would win the silver medal.

Adjaluddin would also compete at the 1936 Summer Olympics held in Berlin, competing in the men's 200 metre breaststroke, men's 100 metre freestyle, and as part of the Philippine relay team, the men's 4 × 200 metre freestyle relay. He would reach the semifinals of the first two events but would not reach the finals of any of the events he was entered in. Though, he would be the first Southeast Asian swimmer to qualify for the semifinals of two events at one Olympic Games. He would be the only Southeast Asian swimmer to have this distinction until 2016.

He would later die on 1 April 1938 at the age of 26.
