= Reizo Koike =

Japanese swimmer (1915–1998)

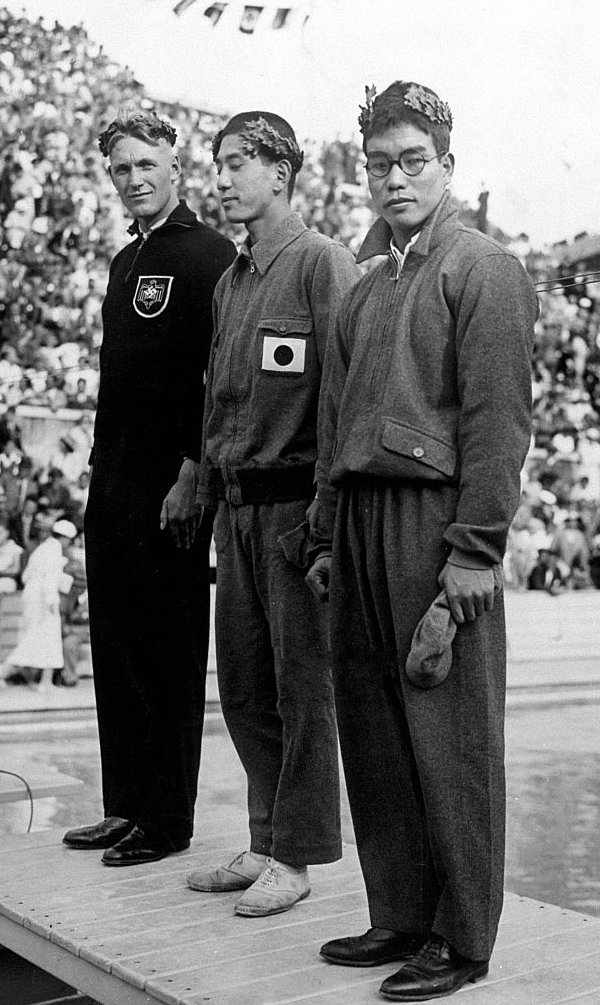
- Erwin Sietas, Tetsuo Hamuro and Reizo Koike at the 1936 Olympics

Personal information
- Nationality: Japanese
- Born: December 12, 1915 Numazu, Shizuoka, Japan
- Died: August 3, 1998 (aged 82)
- Education: Keio University

Sport
- Sport: Swimming
- Event: 200-meter breaststroke

Reizo Koike (小池 禮三, Koike Reizō; December 12, 1915 – August 3, 1998) was a Japanese swimmer who specialized in the 200 m breaststroke.

== Swimming career ==
=== As a swimmer ===
Koike won a silver medal at the 1932 Olympics and a bronze medal at the 1936 Olympics in the 200m breaststroke, and set an unofficial world record in the 100 between these Olympics. During his career Koike won eight national titles.

=== As a coach and administrator ===
After the end of World War II, Koike became a coach for the Japanese national Olympic swimming team and chairman of the Japan Swimming Federation. Koike was present in Barcelona during the 1992 Summer Olympics, when Kyoko Iwasaki won the gold medal.

== Awards ==
In 1990 Koike received the Olympic Order in Silver, and in 1996 was inducted into the International Swimming Hall of Fame.

== Death ==
Koike died of lung cancer in 1998.

== See also ==
- List of members of the International Swimming Hall of Fame
