= Tetsuo Hamuro =

Japanese swimmer (1917–2005)

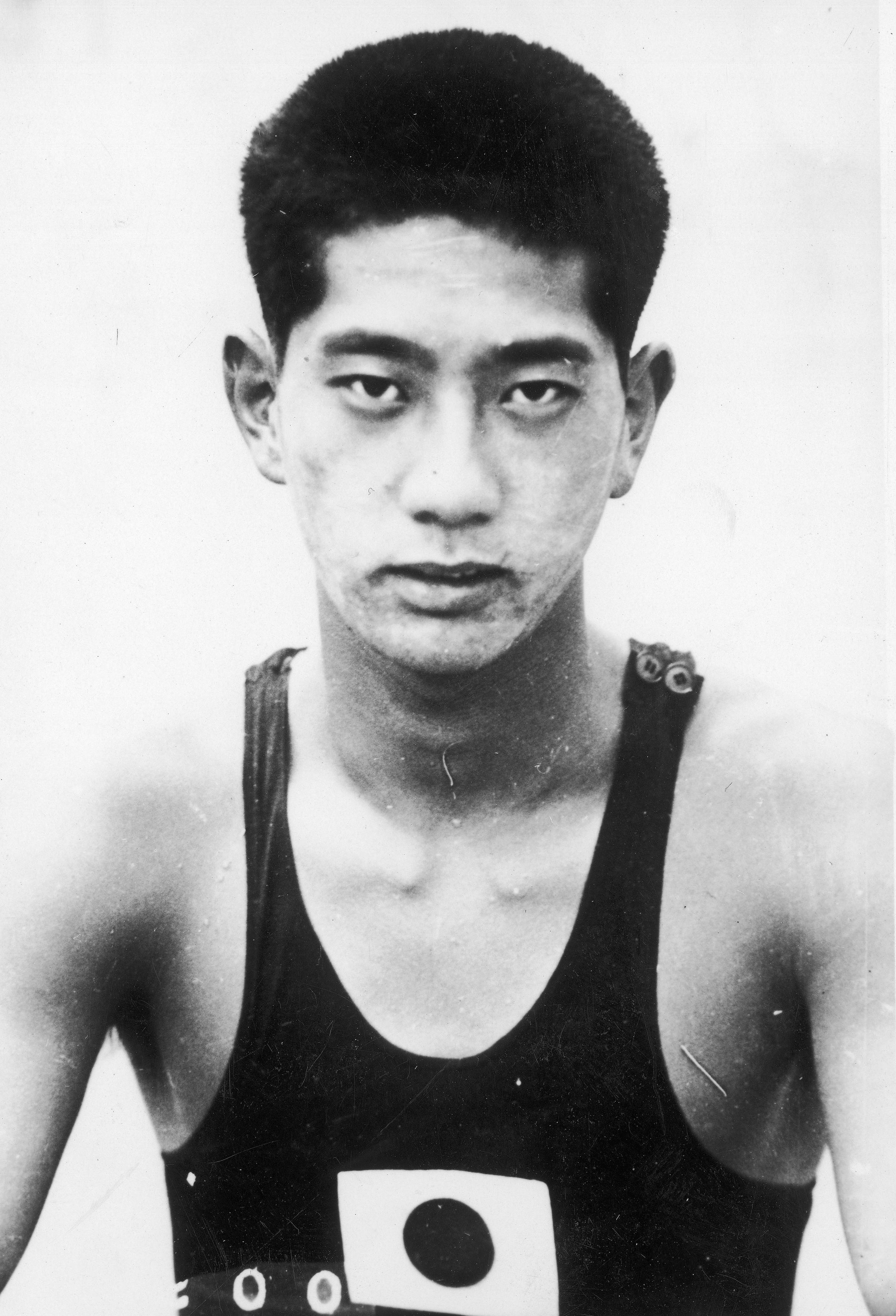

Personal information
- Born: 7 September 1917 Fukuoka, Japan
- Died: 30 October 2005 (aged 88) Takaishi, Osaka, Japan

Sport
- Sport: Swimming
Medal record
Representing Japan
Olympic Games
Gold medal – first place	1936 Berlin	200 m breaststroke

Tetsuo Hamuro (葉室 鐵夫, Hamuro Tetsuo; 7 September 1917 – 30 October 2005) was a Japanese breaststroke swimmer. In 1935 he set a world record in the 200 m. Next year he won the gold medal in this event at the 1936 Olympics, setting a new Olympic record at 2:41.5. Hamuro swam the traditional breaststroke, while some of his competitors used the butterfly stroke, which was allowed at the time. Between 1935 and 1940 Hamuro never lost a race and won ten national breaststroke titles. After World War II he worked for the Mainichi newspaper as a sports journalist. In 1990, he was inducted into the International Swimming Hall of Fame.

Hamuro's wife was also a swimmer and a world champion in the masters category.

== See also ==
- List of members of the International Swimming Hall of Fame
