= Ågren =

Ågren is a Swedish family name. It originated as a Swedish ornamental family name from combining å, meaning "river" or "creek", and gren, meaning "branch".

Notable people with this surname include:

- Ayla Ågren (born 1993), Norwegian-Swedish racing driver
- Björn Ågren (born 1979), Swedish guitarist
- Erik Ågren (boxer) (1916–1985), Swedish boxer
- Erik Ågren (writer) (1924–2008), Finnish translator and writer
- Gösta Ågren (1936–2020), Finnish author
- Janet Ågren (born 1949), Swedish actor
- Jennifer Ågren (born 1993), Swedish Taekwondo practitioner
- Leo Ågren (1928–1984), Finland-Swedish author
- Morgan Ågren (born 1967), Swedish drummer
- Oscar Ågren (1914–1992), Swedish boxer
- Oskar Ågren (born 1998), Swedish soccer player
- Per Ågren (born 1962), Swedish soccer player
- Peter Ågren, Swedish songwriter and producer
- Ulrika Ågren (born 1987), Swedish team handball player

Agren

- Sigrid Agren (born 1992), French fashion model

Ahgren

- Ludwig Ahgren (born 1995), American livestreamer
