= Boxing at the 1936 Summer Olympics – Bantamweight =

Boxing competitions

The men's bantamweight event was part of the boxing programme at the 1936 Summer Olympics. The weight class was the second lightest contested and allowed boxers of up to 119 pounds (53.5 kilograms). The competition was held from Monday, August 10, 1936, to Saturday, August 15, 1936. Twenty-four boxers from 24 nations competed.

== Medalists ==
Gold	Silver	Bronze
Ulderico Sergo; Italy	Jack Wilson; United States	Fidel Ortiz; Mexico

== Results ==
Round of 32; August 10
Fidel Ortiz (MEX)	PTS
Hervé Lacelles (CAN)	L
Albert Barnes (GBR)	PTS
František Doležal (TCH)	L
Alec Hannan (RSA)	PTS
Veikko Huuskonen (FIN)	L
Antoni Czortek (POL)	PTS
Pierre Bonnet (FRA)	L
Wilhelm Stasch (GER)	PTS
Marin Gaşpar (ROU)	L
Oscar de Larrazábal (PHI)	PTS
Viggo Frederiksen (DEN)	L
Alfredo Petrone (URU)	PTS
Frans de Moor (NED)	L
Jack Wilson (USA)	PTS
Leonardo Gula (ARG)	L

Round of 16; August 11
Joseph Cornelis (BEL)	PTS
José Vergara (CHI)	L
Ulderico Sergo (ITA)	PTS
Frigyes Kubinyi (HUN)	L
Stig Cederberg (SWE)	PTS
Walter Mathä (AUT)	L
Shunpei Hashioka (JPN)	PTS
Karl Kummer (SUI)	L
Fidel Ortiz (MEX)	PTS
Albert Barnes (GBR)	L
Alec Hannan (RSA)	PTS
Antoni Czortek (POL)	L
Wilhelm Stasch (GER)	L
Oscar de Larrazábal (PHI)	PTS
Alfredo Petrone (URU)	L
Jack Wilson (USA)	PTS

Quarterfinals; August 13
Joseph Cornelis (BEL)	L
Ulderico Sergo (ITA)	PTS
Stig Cederberg (SWE)	PTS
Shunpei Hashioka (JPN)	L
Fidel Ortiz (MEX)	PTS
Alec Hannan (RSA)	L
Oscar de Larrazábal (PHI)	L
Jack Wilson (USA)	PTS

Semifinals; August 14
Ulderico Sergo (ITA)	PTS
Stig Cederberg (SWE)	L
Fidel Ortiz (MEX)	L
Jack Wilson (USA)	PTS

Final; August 15
Ulderico Sergo (ITA)	PTS
Jack Wilson (USA)	L
Bronze medal bout
Fidel Ortiz (MEX)	PTS
Stig Cederberg (SWE)	L
