= Veikko Huuskonen =

Finnish boxer

Personal information
- Born: 8 February 1910 Helsinki, Finland
- Died: 3 June 1973 (aged 63) Helsinki, Finland

Sport
- Sport: Boxing
Medal record
Men's amateur boxing
Representing Finland
European Amateur Championships
Bronze medal – third place	1937 Milan

Veikko Huuskonen (8 February 1910 in Helsinki – 3 June 1973) was a Finnish boxer who competed in the 1936 Summer Olympics.

In 1936 he was eliminated in the first round of the bantamweight class after losing his fight to Alec Hannan of South Africa.

In 1937, Huuskonen won a bronze medal at the European Amateur Boxing Championships in Milan. He beat a Swiss boxer by knockout, with both contestants being praised for technical and stylish boxing. Losing to eventual gold medalist Ulderico Sergo, Huuskonen then won the bronze medal ahead of Antoni Czortek who forfeited. This was the third Finnish medal at the European Championships, after Kaarlo Väkevä and Gunnar Bärlund.

He was a five-time Finnish champion: 1936 (53.5 kg), 1937 (54), 1939 (54), 1940 (54) and 1941 (54). Huuskonen also competed in the widely spectated Swedish–Finnish boxing match. His 21st representative match for Finland came in 1939, when he beat Harry Ljushammar. 7,500 people attended the event in Messuhalli. Following the victory, Hufvudstadsbladet commented that Huuskonen should have been considered for the 1939 European Amateur Boxing Championships.
