= Nagamatsu =

Nagamatsu (written: 永松) is a Japanese surname. Notable people with the surname include:

- Hidekichi Nagamatsu (永松 英吉; 1914–1992), Japanese boxer
- Ryō Nagamatsu (永松亮; born 1982), Japanese composer
- Sequoia Nagamatsu, American writer

== See also ==
- Nakamatsu
