= Erik Ågren =

Erik Ågren may refer to:

- Erik Ågren (boxer) (1916–1985), Swedish boxer
- Erik Ågren (writer) (1924–2008), Finnish translator and writer
