= Theodore Kara =

American boxer

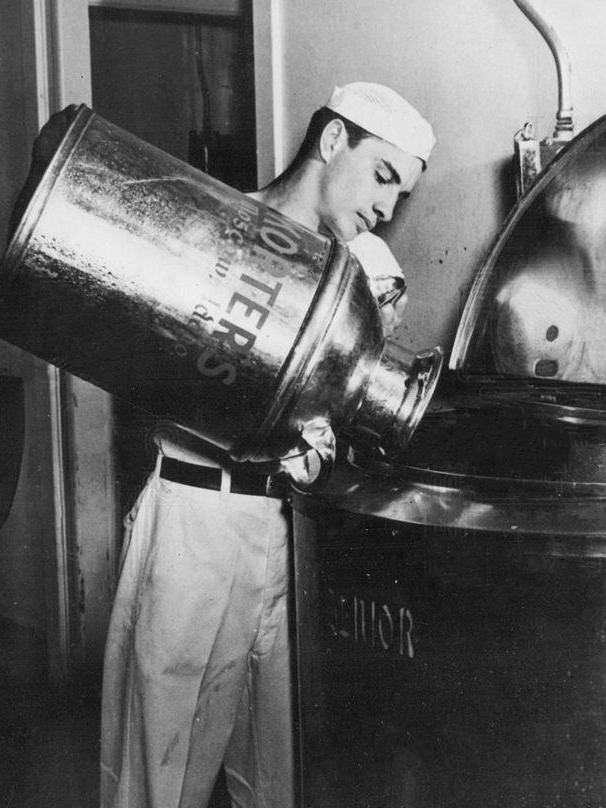
- Kara in 1939

Personal information
- Born: April 2, 1916 Cleveland, Ohio, U.S.
- Died: February 14, 1944 (aged 27) Pacific Ocean

Sport
- Sport: Boxing

Theodore Ernst Kara (April 2, 1916 – February 14, 1944) was an American featherweight boxer who competed in the 1936 Summer Olympics in Berlin.

== Boxing career ==
He competed in the Men's Featherweight Boxing at the 1936 Olympics and was eliminated in the quarter-finals, after losing to the upcoming silver medalist Charles Catterall. Kara also won three NCAA boxing titles for the University of Idaho, in 1939, 1940 and 1941.

== 1936 Olympic results ==
Below are the results of Theodore Kara:

- Round of 32: defeated Felipe Gabuco (Philippines) referee stopped contest in the third round
- Round of 16: defeated Evald Seepere (Estonia) on points
- Quarterfinal: lost to Charles Catterall (South Africa) on points

== Army career and disappearance ==
Kara was a radio-man in the United States Army Air Corps and was declared dead after his plane went missing in action over the Pacific in 1944 during World War II. He was married at the time of his death to Marion Amirkanian of Fresno, California, but had no children. His brother Frank was also an NCAA boxing champion.

== See also ==
- List of people who disappeared mysteriously at sea
