= Boxing at the 1936 Summer Olympics – Lightweight =

Boxing competitions

The men's lightweight event was part of the boxing programme at the 1936 Summer Olympics. The weight class was the fourth-lightest contested, and allowed boxers of up to 135 pounds (61.2 kilograms). The competition was held from Tuesday, August 11, 1936 to Saturday, August 15, 1936. Twenty-six boxers from 26 nations competed.

== Medalists ==
Gold	Silver	Bronze
Imre Harangi; Hungary	Nikolai Stepulov; Estonia	Erik Ågren; Sweden

== Results ==
Round of 32; August 11
José Padilla (PHI)	PTS
Karl Schmedes (GER)	L
Czesław Cyraniak (POL)	PTS
François Aupetit (FRA)	L
Nikolai Stepulov (EST)	PTS
André Wollscheidt (LUX)	L
Hidekichi Nagamatsu (JPN)	W
Jan Chytrý (TCH)	DIS2
Carlos Lillo (CHI)	PTS
Thomas Hamilton-Brown (RSA)	L
Kosta Hakim (EGY)	PTS
André Rasenberg (NED)	L
Simon Dewinter (BEL)	W
Alois Swatosch (AUT)	KO1
Andy Scrivani (USA)	PTS
Frederick Simpson (GBR)	L
Marino Facchin (ITA)	PTS
Constantin David (ROU)	L
Erik Ågren (SWE)	PTS
Lorenzo Delgado (MEX)	L

Round of 16; August 12
Lidoro Oliver (ARG)	PTS
Norman Fisher (NZL)	L
Poul Kops (DEN)	PTS
Ragnar Haugen (NOR)	L
Imre Harangi (HUN)	PTS
Robert Seidel (SUI)	L
José Padilla, Jr. (PHI)	PTS
Czesław Cyraniak (POL)	L
Nikolai Stepulov (EST)	PTS
Hidekichi Nagamatsu (JPN)	L
Carlos Lillo (CHI)	PTS
Kosta Hakim (EGY)	L
Simon Dewinter (BEL)	L
Andy Scrivani (USA)	PTS
Marino Facchin (ITA)	L
Erik Ågren (SWE)	PTS

Quarterfinals; August 13
Lidoro Oliver (ARG)	L
Poul Kops (DEN)	PTS
Imre Harangi (HUN)	PTS
José Padilla, Jr. (PHI)	L
Nikolai Stepulov (EST)	PTS
Carlos Lillo (CHI)	L
Andy Scrivani (USA)	L
Erik Ågren (SWE)	PTS

Semifinals; August 14
Poul Kops (DEN)	L
Imre Harangi (HUN)	PTS
Nikolai Stepulov (EST)	PTS
Erik Ågren (SWE)	L

Final; August 15
Imre Harangi (HUN)	PTS
Nikolai Stepulov (EST)	L
Bronze medal bout
Erik Ågren (SWE)	wo
Poul Kops (DEN)
