= Ragnar Haugen =

Norwegian boxer

Ragnar "Sambo" Haugen (August 25, 1911 – October 8, 1964) was a Norwegian boxer who competed in the 1936 Summer Olympics.

In 1936 he eliminated in the second round of the lightweight class after losing his fight to Poul Kops.
