= Walter Mathä =

Austrian boxer (1914–?)

Walter Mathä (25 September 1914 – ?) is an Austrian boxer who competed in the 1936 Summer Olympics. In 1936, he was eliminated in the second round of the bantamweight class after losing his fight to Stig Cederberg.
