= 1934 European Amateur Boxing Championships =

Boxing competitions

- Host city: Budapest
- Country: Hungary
- Nations: 13
- Athletes: 74
- Dates: 11–15 April

The 1934 European Amateur Boxing Championships were held in Budapest, Hungary from 11 to 15 April. It was the fourth edition of the competition, organised by the European governing body for amateur boxing, EABA. There were 74 fighters from 13 countries participating.

== Medal winners ==
Event	Gold	Silver	Bronze
Flyweight (– 50.8 kilograms)	Patrick Palmer; England	Frigyes Kubinyi; Hungary	Szapsel Rotholc; Poland
Bantamweight (– 53.5 kilograms)	István Énekes; Hungary	Stig Cederberg; Sweden	Tadeusz Rogalski; Poland
Featherweight (– 57.1 kilograms)	Otto Kästner; Germany	Dezső Frigyes; Hungary	Mieczysław Forlański; Poland
Lightweight (– 61.2 kilograms)	Marino Facchin; Italy	Imre Harangi; Hungary	Karl Schmedes; Germany
Welterweight (– 66.7 kilograms)	David McCleave; England	István Varga; Hungary	Ole Røisland; Norway
Middleweight (– 72.6 kilograms)	Lajos Szigeti; Hungary	Witold Majchrzycki; Poland	Alfredo Neri; Italy
Light Heavyweight (– 79.4 kilograms)	Hans Zehetmayer; Austria	Roman Antczak; Poland	Wilhelm Pürsch; Germany
Heavyweight (+ 79.4 kilograms)	Gunnar Bärlund; Finland	Herbert Runge; Germany	Patrick Floyd; England

== Medal table ==
Rank	Nation	Gold	Silver	Bronze	Total
1	Hungary (HUN)	2	4	0	6
2	England (ENG)	2	0	1	3
3	Germany (GER)	1	1	2	4
4	Italy (ITA)	1	0	1	2
5	Austria (AUT)	1	0	0	1
5	Finland (FIN)	1	0	0	1
7	Poland (POL)	0	2	3	5
8	Sweden (SWE)	0	1	0	1
9	Norway (NOR)	0	0	1	1
Totals (9 entries)		8	8	8	24
