= Mughrabi =

Mughrabi, Mugrabi, Mograby, Mograbi, or Moghrabi is a surname and place name derived from "Maghreb" – meaning "West" in Arabic, and usually referring to the westernmost part of the Arab and Muslim world. It exists among both Muslims and Jews originating from this region.

== Mughrabi ==
- Ibrahim Mughrabi, Syrian football player
- Avi Mograbi, Israeli documentary filmmaker
- Dalal Mughrabi, Palestinian militant involved in killing Israeli civilians (March 11, 1978)
- Firas Mugrabi, Israeli football player
- Jose Mugrabi, Syrian Israeli art collector

== El Mughrabi ==
- Ismael Al-Maghrebi, Saudi Arabian football player
- Ahmed El Maghrabi, Egyptian businessman and politician
- Khalil Amira El-Maghrabi, Egyptian boxer
- Jomana Elmaghrabi, Egyptian synchronised swimmer
- Razan Naiem Almoghrabi, Libyan writer and feminist
- Samy Elmaghribi, Jewish-Moroccan musician
- Khaled Al-Maghrabi, Saudi Arabian football player
- Muhammad Al Maghrabi, Libyan football player

== Locations ==
- Mughrabi Quarter, historic quarter of the Old City of Jerusalem, razed in 1967 to make way for the Wailing Wall Plaza
- Mughrabi, Yemen
