= David Constantine (disambiguation) =

David Constantine may refer to:

- David Constantine (born 1944), English poet
- Dave Constantine (David Constantine, born 1957), English footballer, see List of Bury F.C. players (25–99 appearances)

== See also ==
- David Constantin
- Constantin David
