= François Aupetit =

French boxer

François Aupetit (2 March 1913 – 6 January 1945) was a French boxer who competed in the 1936 Summer Olympics. In 1936 he was eliminated in the first round of the lightweight class after losing his fight to Czesław Cyraniak.
