= Leonardo Gula =

Argentine boxer (born 1914)

Leonardo Gula (born 6 March 1914, date of death unknown) was an Argentine boxer who competed in the 1936 Summer Olympics.

Gula was born in Cordoba, Argentina. In 1936 he was eliminated in the first round of the bantamweight class after losing his fight to Jack Wilson.
