= Karl Zurflüh =

Swiss boxer

Karl Zurflüh (January 26, 1913 – October 1962) was a Swiss boxer who competed in the 1936 Summer Olympics.

In 1936 he was eliminated in the first round of the featherweight class after losing his fight to Remi Lescrauwaet.
