= Josef Jelen =

Czechoslovak boxer

Josef Jelen (born August 10, 1914, date of death unknown) is a Czech boxer who competed in the 1936 Summer Olympics for Czechoslovakia.

In 1936 he was eliminated in the second round of the featherweight class after losing his fight to William Marquart.
