= André Wollscheidt =

Luxembourgish boxer

André Wollscheidt (April 24, 1914 in Esch-sur-Alzette – January 31, 1995) was a Luxembourgish boxer who competed in the 1936 Summer Olympics.

In 1936 he was eliminated in the first round of the lightweight class after losing his fight to silver medalist Nikolai Stepulov of Estonia
