= Frans de Moor =

Dutch boxer (1912–1983)

Johannes Frans de Moor (5 May 1912, Amsterdam – 22 January 1983, Amsterdam) was a Dutch boxer who competed in the 1936 Summer Olympics.

In 1936 he was eliminated in the first round of the bantamweight class after losing his fight to Alfredo Petrone of Uruguay.
