= Hervé Lacelles =

Canadian boxer

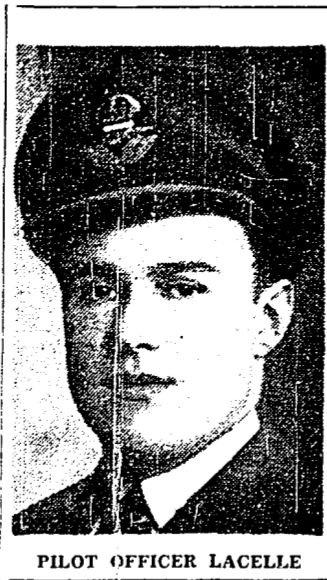
Lacelles in 1942

Joseph Harvey Milton Lacelle (January 18, 1918 – June 28, 1942) was a Canadian boxer who competed in the 1936 Summer Olympics.

He was born in Ottawa, Ontario. In the 1936 Berlin Olympics, he was eliminated in the first round of the bantamweight class after losing his fight to eventual bronze medalist Fidel Ortiz. A member of the Royal Canadian Air Force, he was killed during a bombing raid over Berlin on June 28, 1942, and buried at the Bergen-OP-Zoom Canadian War Cemetery in the Netherlands.
