= Lidoro Oliver =

Argentine boxer

Lidoro Julian Oliver (18 September 1915, date of death unknown) was an Argentine boxer who competed in the 1936 Summer Olympics.

In 1936 he was eliminated in the quarter-finals of the lightweight class after losing his fight to Poul Kops.
