= Hashioka =

Hashioka (written: 橋岡) is a Japanese surname. Notable people with the surname include:

- Daiki Hashioka (橋岡 大樹, born 1999), Japanese footballer
- Kazuki Hashioka (橋岡 和樹, born 1997), Japanese footballer
- Shunpei Hashioka (橋岡 俊平, born 1911), Japanese boxer
- Yuki Hashioka (橋岡 優輝, born 1999), Japanese long jumper

== See also ==
- Hashioka Station, a railway station in Takamatsu, Kagawa Prefecture, Japan
