= André Rasenberg =

Dutch boxer

Adriaan "André" Rasenberg (June 17, 1914 – December 24, 1994) was a Dutch boxer who competed in the 1936 Summer Olympics.

He was born in Oosterhout and died in Breda.

In 1936 he was eliminated in the first round of the lightweight class after losing his fight to Kosta Hakim.
