= Jan Chytrý =

Czechoslovak boxer

Jan Chytrý (February 8, 1917 – January 3, 1979) was a Czech boxer who competed for Czechoslovakia in the 1936 Summer Olympics. In 1936 he was eliminated in the first round of the lightweight class after losing his fight to Hidekichi Nagamatsu.
