= Giuseppe Farfanelli =

Italian boxer

Giuseppe Farfanelli (13 February 1915 – 8 January 1992) was an Italian boxer who competed in the 1936 Summer Olympics. He was born in Perugia. In 1936 he was eliminated in the first round of the featherweight class after losing his fight to John Treadaway.
