= Sajiro Miyama =

Japanese boxer (born 1917)

Sajiro Miyama (Japanese: 佐治郎 宮間; born 20 January 1917, date of death unknown) was a Japanese boxer who competed in the 1936 Summer Olympics. He was born in Nagoya.

In 1936 he was eliminated in the first round of the featherweight class after losing his fight to Arquímedes Arrieta of Uruguay.

Miyama is deceased.
