= Karl Kummer (boxer) =

Swiss boxer

Karl Kummer (born August 3, 1909, date of death unknown) is a Swiss boxer who competed in the 1936 Summer Olympics.

In 1936 he was eliminated in the second round of the bantamweight class after losing his fight to Shunpei Hashioka.
