= Dezső Frigyes =

Hungarian boxer

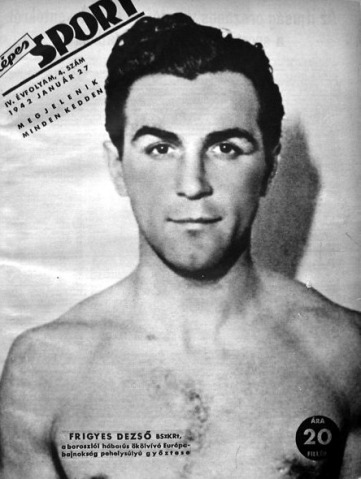
Cover of the national illustrated sports weekly “Képes Sport”* with Dezső Frigyes after his European Championship victory.

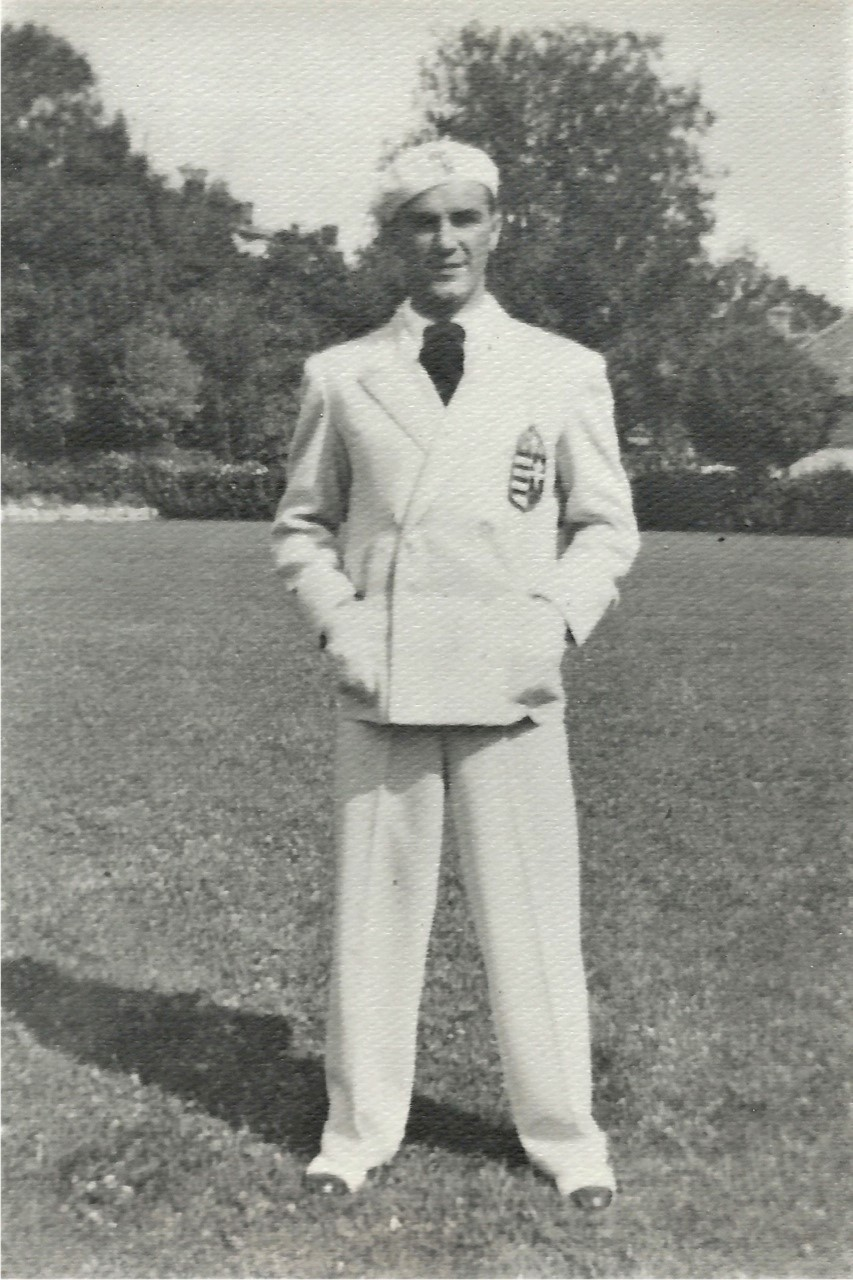
Frigyes in the 1936 Hungarian Olympic Team uniform.

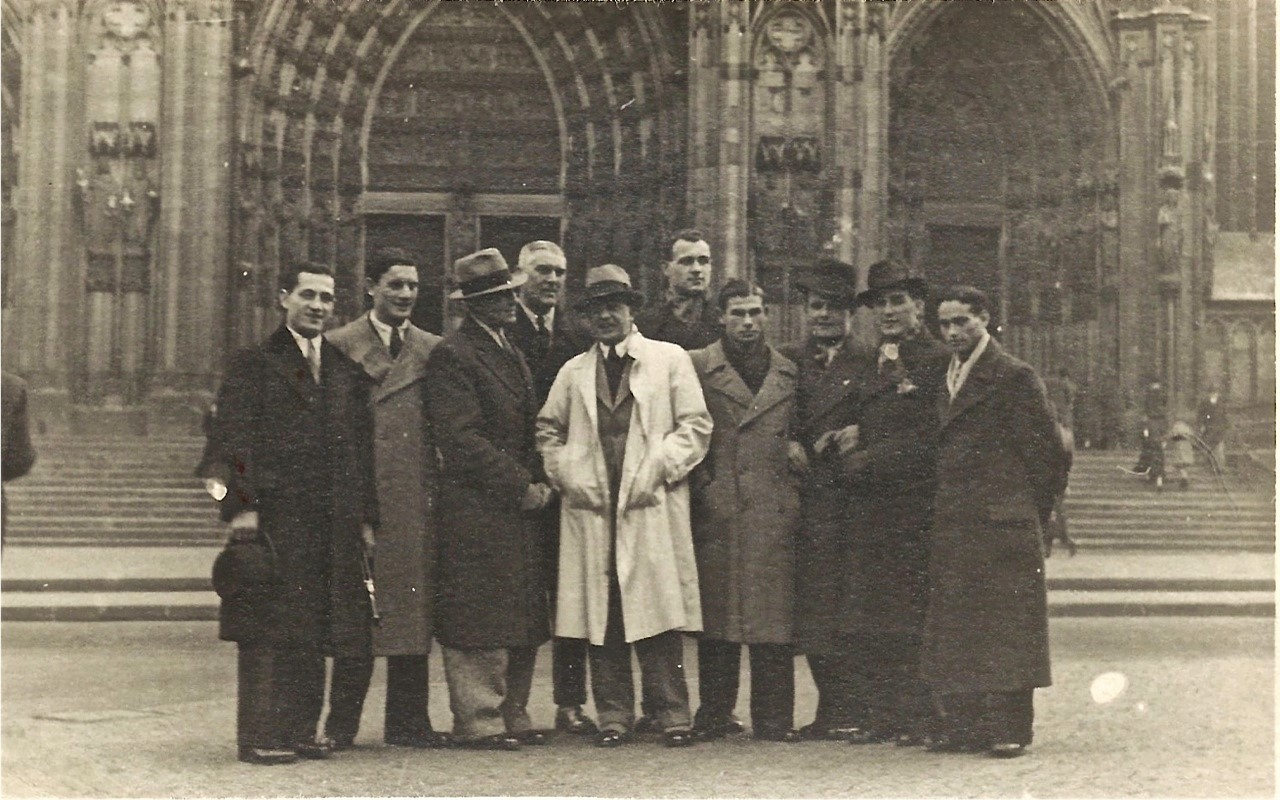
Hungarian National Boxing Team standing in front of the Cologne Cathedral, Germany, circa 1935. Frigyes is the second from right.

Dezső Frigyes né Dezső Fritsch (November 27, 1913 – July 18, 1984) was a Hungarian boxer who competed in the 1936 Summer Olympics. He was born in Budapest and died in Cleveland. In 1936 he finished fourth in the featherweight class after losing the bronze medal bout to Josef Miner. He won the silver medal in the 1934 European Amateur Boxing Championships in Budapest, and the gold medal in the 1942 European Amateur Boxing Championships in Breslau.

== Early life ==
Frigyes was born to a Hungarian Danube Schwabian family in Budapest. At age 15 he began his career winning the Hungarian National Youth Championships. In 1932, at age 18, he was selected to the National Team and for the next 12 years competed in championships throughout Europe, including two European Championships, an Olympics, and a US tour in 1936.

== Career Highlights (selected) ==
Following individual wins in Berlin and Warsaw, Frigyes won the silver medal in April, 1934, at the European Championships in featherweight class. In the quarter-finals of the tournament, he defeated Gösta Alm of Sweden, winning on points. In the semi-finals he defeated Mieczysław Forlański of Poland on points. In the final fight he lost on points to Otto Kästner of Germany.

In August, 1936, Frigyes competed in the Summer Olympics in Berlin in featherweight class. He beat Denmark's Sigfred Madsen in the Round of 32. In the quarter-finals he bested Canadian William "Billy" Marquart on points, advancing to the semi-finals. There he lost on points to the Argentinian Oscar Casanovas who went on to take the gold medal. In the duel for the bronze medal he lost to the German Josef Miner, who took fourth place. Until 1948, losing semi-finalists held a bronze medal playoff, since 1952, both semi-finalists who lost to the gold and the silver medalist, received bronze medals.

In October, 1936, Frigyes was part of the European lineup for the annual "US Golden Gloves vs. Europe" tournament, held in New York. He finished first in the featherweight class beating Bernie Miller.

Frigyes won the 1938 Hungarian National Championships in featherweight class, and that year there was an active schedule of national pairings. In the year's five matchups for Hungary, Frigyes won four, beating in the finals, Italians Antonio Mangialardo in Trieste, Aroldo Montanari in Riccione, the German Jakob Schöneberger in Budapest, and Poland's Antoni Czortek.

January 20–25, 1942, a capacity crowd of 8,000 spectators packed the Centennial Hall (Jahrhunderthalle) in Breslau, Germany, today Wrocław, Poland, for the 1942 European Amateur Boxing Championships. Frigyes won the gold medal, beating Germany's Arthur Büttner in the finals.

To the end of his years, Frigyes recalled the 1942 medal ceremony as one of the most moving moments of his life. The presentation of the Hungarian national anthem on the Walcker Orgelbau-built pipe organ, which with 15,133 pipes and 200 stops, ranked at the time as the world's largest, before a capacity crowd in the futuristic architectural landmark designed by Max Berg, was a unique experience, well-documented in the sports media of the time.

After World War II, the results of the 1942 European Championships were annulled by the AIBA.

== Later life ==
The 1940 and the 1944 Olympic Games were cancelled during World War II. After the Second World War, Frigyes was past competition age. Hungary was under Soviet occupation and he did not join the Communist Party.

Gradually, by 1949, he was permitted to coach, but away from Budapest in the northwestern town Győr where he trained the Vasas ETO boxers. Within a year he groomed the regional club's first national champion, László Szabó, and the Vasas ETO team was advanced to the major league among the large Budapest clubs. In 1951 he was named as the national Vasas network's best trainer.

From 1953 to 1956 he was a member of the coaching staff of the Hungarian National Team.

When the Hungarian Revolution of 1956 was quelled by the returning Soviet army, Frigyes took his family to the United States, entering at the refugee camp in Camp Kilmer, New Jersey. A network television crew wanted to interview them in the camp, but with family remaining in Hungary, Frigyes declined, due to concern about potential reprisals against their relatives who stayed behind.

The immigration policy of the mid-1950s was that refugees were dispersed to various locations in the US. He and his family were relocated to Cleveland, Ohio, where he trained boxers for the Golden Gloves championships, some of whom went on to become medalists.

Frigyes died on July 18, 1984, in Cleveland, survived by his wife of 37 years, Esther, an executive at the Chilcote Company, and their son, Dennis, a lawyer, then in Ohio, later in California, and his two daughters by a previous marriage, Vilma Fülöp and Ágnes Fehér.

== Coda ==
After the Second World War, the Centennial Hall in Breslau/Wrocław was renamed Hala Ludowa, and was listed as a UNESCO World Heritage Site in 2006. The great pipe organ was moved to the Cathedral of St. John the Baptist, the seat of the Roman Catholic Archdiocese of Wrocław.

In 2008, his wife Esther and son Dennis traveled to Poland and went to both locations. Although 1942 was long before the time of the acting manager at Hala Ludowa, he illuminated the entire Hall for them and opened up the archives for the family of the late champion.

At the cathedral, both the mother-superior and the organist spoke German, though the latter did not know the anthem that was being requested. Outside the cathedral, by the fountain, an American son, spoke German with a Polish organist, hummed the Hungarian anthem, which the organist jotted into musical notes on a napkin. Through the organist's skill, the result was a flawless rendition of the Hungarian Anthem, played one more time, on the organ on which Dezső Frigyes heard it, 66 years before.

== 1936 Olympic results ==
Below is the record of Dezső Frigyes, a Hungarian featherweight boxer who competed at the 1936 Berlin Olympics:

- Round of 32: bye
- Round of 16: defeated Sigfred Madsen (Denmark) on points
- Quarterfinal: defeated William Marquart (Canada) on points
- Semifinal: lost to Oscar Casanovas (Argentina) on points
- Bronze Medal Bout: lost to Josef Miner (Germany) on points

== Sources ==
- European Championships1934
- US Golden Gloves vs. Europe 1931-1954 - BoxRec
- Die Geschichte des SHABV
