= Hans Wiltschek =

Austrian boxer (1911–1999)

Hans Wiltschek (15 December 1911 – 19 December 1999) was an Austrian boxer who competed in the 1936 Summer Olympics. In 1936 he was eliminated in the first round of the featherweight class after losing his fight to the upcoming silver medalist Charles Catterall.
