= José Vergara =

José Vergara may refer to:

- José Vergara (boxer) (born 1915), Chilean Olympic boxer
- José Vergara Correa (1844–1919), Chilean politician, member of the Chamber of Deputies in 1897–1909
- José Vergara Donoso (1850–1909), Chilean politician, minister of foreign affairs in 1902
- José Vergara Galeas (1827–1887), Chilean politician, minister of justice in 1881–1883
- José Vergara Gimeno (1726–1799), Spanish painter, works on display at the church of San Nicolás, Valencia
- José Francisco Vergara (1833–1889), Chilean politician and war hero, minister of the interior in 1881–1882
- José Ignacio Vergara (1837–1889), Chilean politician, minister of the interior in 1885
- José María Vergara y Vergara (1831–1872), Colombian writer and politician
- Camilo José Vergara (born 1944), Chilean writer and photographer
