= Robert Seidel =

Swiss boxer

Robert Seidel (March 12, 1918 – July 1982) was a Swiss boxer who competed in the 1936 Summer Olympics.

In 1936 he was eliminated in the second round of the lightweight class after losing his fight to the upcoming gold medalist Imre Harangi.
