= Pierre Bonnet =

Pierre Bonnet may refer to:

- Pierre Bonnet (composer) (fl. 1585), French composer
- Pierre Ossian Bonnet (1819–1892), French mathematician
- Pierre Bonnet (naturalist) (1897–1990), French arachnologist
- Pierre Bonnet (boxer) (1910–1983), French boxer
