= Lorenzo Delgado =

Mexican boxer

Personal information
- Born: 10 August 1916 Mexico

Boxing career

Boxing record
- Total fights: 5
- Wins: 1
- Win by KO: 1
- Losses: 3
- Draws: 1

Lorenzo Delgado (born 10 August 1916, date of death unknown) is a Mexican boxer that competed in the 1936 Summer Olympics held in Berlin, Germany.

== Amateur career ==
Delgado was selected into the four-member boxing team that represented Mexico in the 1936 Summer Olympics, and he trained under former medalist Francisco Cabañas at the YMCA Gymnasium in Mexico City. They left for Veracruz with the Olympic delegation on 29 June 1936, traveled to Hamburg by ship, and finally arrived by train to the German capital city.

His participation in the Olympic games, however, was short-lived. On 10 August 1936, Delgado was eliminated in the first round of the lightweight class after losing his fight to Erik Ågren, the upcoming bronze medalist from Sweden.

== Professional career ==
He debuted professionally on 20 March 1937 at Arena Jalisco, in Guadalajara. In his first bout, Delgado drew after ten rounds with fellow Mexican Frankie Zavalza. He won the next match against Isidro Muñoz in the same city, but ended up losing the next three bouts held in Mexico City; first against Carlos Miranda and Jorge Morelia at Arena México, and finally against Luis Argüelles at Arena Coliseo.
