= Boxing at the 1936 Summer Olympics – Featherweight =

Boxing competitions

The men's featherweight event was part of the boxing programme at the 1936 Summer Olympics. The weight class was the third-lightest contested, and allowed boxers of up to 126 pounds (57.2 kilograms). The competition was held from Tuesday to Saturday, 11 to 15 August 1936. Twenty-four boxers from 24 nations competed.

== Medalists ==
Gold	Silver	Bronze
Oscar Casanovas; Argentina	Charles Catterall; South Africa	Josef Miner; Germany

== Results ==
Round of 32; 11 August
Dezső Frigyes (HUN)	—
Bye	—
Sigfred Madsen (DEN)	—
Bye	—
William Marquart (CAN)	—
Bye	—
Josef Jelen (TCH)	—
Bye	—
Aleksander Polus (POL)	—
Bye	—
Oscar Casanovas (ARG)	—
Bye	—
Åke Karlsson (FIN)	PTS
Clarrie Gordon (NZL)	L
John Treadaway (GBR)	PTS
Giuseppe Farfanelli (ITA)	L
Arquímedes Arrieta (URU)	PTS
Sajiro Miyama (JPN)	L
Remi Lescrauwaet (BEL)	PTS
Karl Zurflüh (SUI)	L
Josef Miner (GER)	PTS
Khalil Amira El-Maghrabi (EGY)	L
Charles Catterall (RSA)	PTS
Hans Wiltschek (AUT)	L
Jan Nicolaas (NED)	PTS
Sabino Islas (MEX)	L
Evald Seeberg (EST)	PTS
Nicolae Berechet (ROU)	L
Theodore Kara (USA)	W
Felipe Gabuco (PHI)	RSC3

Round of 16; 12 August
Frigyes (HUN)	PTS
Madsen (DEN)	L
Marquart (CAN)	PTS
Jelen (TCH)	L
Polus (POL)	—
Bye	—
Casanovas (ARG)	PTS
Karlsson (FIN)	L
Treadaway (GBR)	PTS
Arrieta (URU)	L
Lescrauwaet (BEL)	L
Miner (GER)	PTS
Catterall (RSA)	PTS
Nicolaas (NED)	L
Seeberg (EST)	L
Kara (USA)	PTS

Quarterfinals; 13 August
Frigyes (HUN)	PTS
Marquart (CAN)	L
Polus (POL)	L
Casanovas (ARG)	PTS
Treadaway (GBR)	L
Miner (GER)	PTS
Catterall (RSA)	PTS
Kara (USA)	L

Semifinals; 14 August
Frigyes (HUN)	L
Casanovas (ARG)	PTS
Miner (GER)	L
Catterall (RSA)	PTS

Final; 15 August
Casanovas (ARG)	PTS
Catterall (RSA)	L
Bronze medal bout
Miner (GER)	PTS
Frigyes (HUN)	L
