= Swatosch =

Swatosch is a surname. Notable people with the surname include:

- Alois Swatosch (1910–?), Austrian boxer
- Ferdinand Swatosch (1894–1974), Austrian footballer and manager
- Jakob Swatosch (1891–1971), Austrian footballer

== See also ==
- Svatoš
