= Schmedes =

Schmedes is a surname. Notable people with the surname include:

- Erik Schmedes (1868–1931), Danish-born operatic tenor who performed mainly in Germany and Austria
- Karl Schmedes (1908–1981), German boxer
- Kelly Schmedes (born 1983), American soccer player
