= Sabino Islas =

Mexican boxer (1917–1998)

Sabino Islas Jiménez (December 30, 1917 – November 4, 1998) was a Mexican boxer who competed in the 1936 Summer Olympics.

In 1936 he was eliminated in the first round of the featherweight class after losing his fight to Jan Nicolaas of the Netherlands. He died in Mexico City.
