= Antoni Kolczyński =

Polish boxer

Personal information
- Born: 25 August 1917 Zdunowo, Congress Poland
- Died: 19 June 1964 (aged 46) Warsaw, Poland
- Height: 174 cm (5 ft 9 in)
- Weight: 73 kg (161 lb)

Boxing career
Medal record
Men's amateur boxing
Representing Poland
European Amateur Championships
Gold medal – first place	1939 Dublin	Welterweight

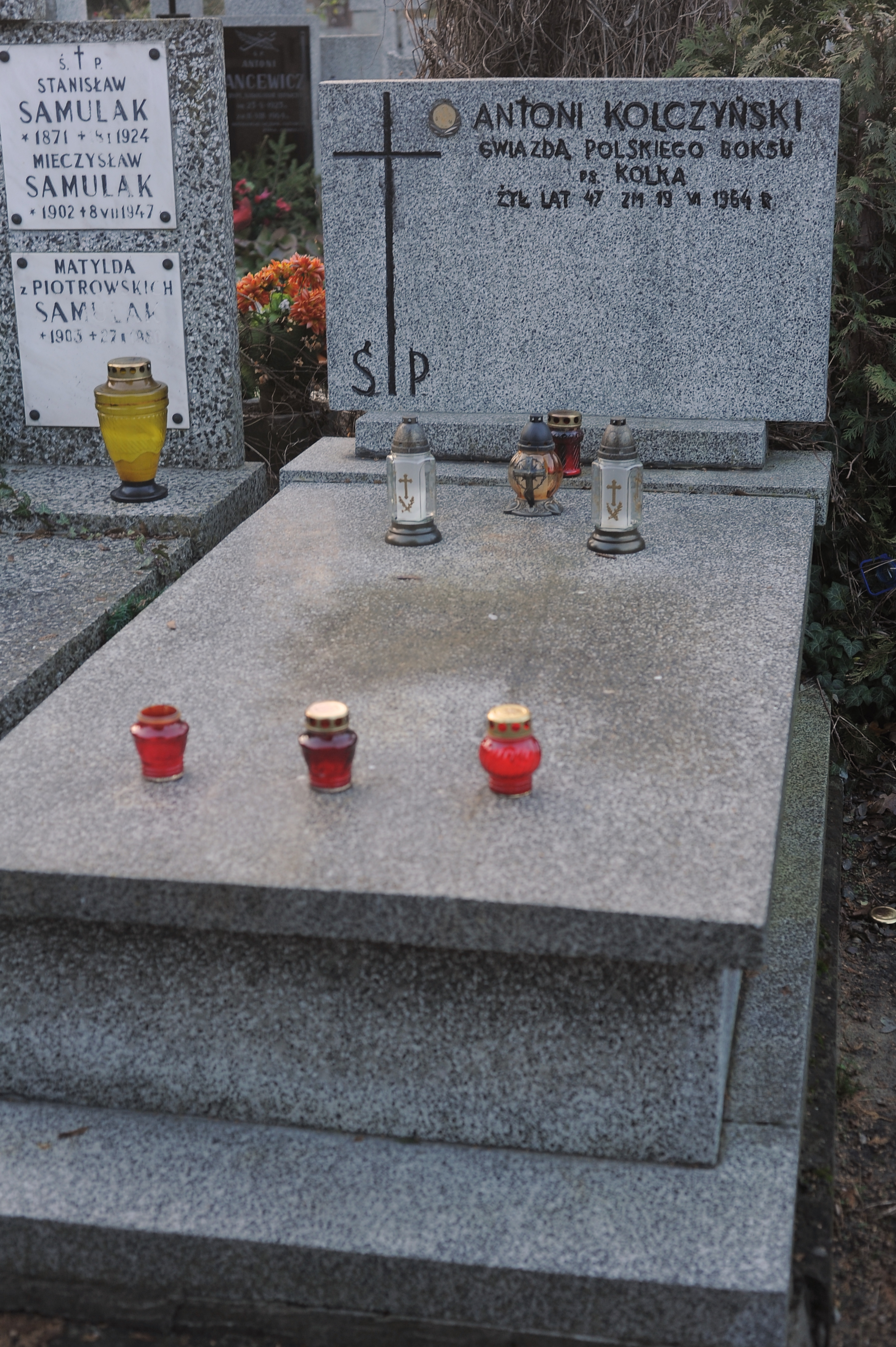
Grave at the Bródno Cemetery in Warsaw

Antoni ‘’Kolka’’ Kolczyński (25 August 1917 – 19 June 1964) was a Polish boxer, champion of Europe and participant in the Olympic Games.

In 1937 he won silver in the Championships of Poland, and next year, he was chosen the best fighter of the Europe - United States boxing match. Also, in 1938 he was voted second most popular athlete of Poland, in the Przeglad Sportowy plebiscite.

During the 1939 European Amateur Boxing Championships in Dublin, Kolczynski achieved his biggest success, winning gold. In the final fight of the welterweight, he beat Erik Ågren from Sweden.

During World War II, Kolczynski was unable to continue career. After 1945, he never got back to the late-1930s form. He participated in the 1948 Olympic Games in London as well as other tournaments without much success. However, he was a top champion of Poland, winning the national competitions in 1946, 1947, 1950 and 1951. Kolczynski ended career in 1952. Altogether, he fought 238 times, winning 216 fights and losing 22.

== 1948 Olympic results ==
Below is the record of Antoni Kolczyński, a Polish middleweight boxer who competed at the 1948 London Olympics:

- Round of 32: bye
- Round of 16: lost to Dogomar Martinez (Uruguay) on points
