= Marin Gașpar =

Romanian boxer

Marin Gaşpar (born 15 August 1917, date of death unknown) is a Romanian boxer who competed in the 1936 Summer Olympics. He was born in Zimnicea.

In 1936 he was eliminated in the first round of the bantamweight class after losing his fight to Wilhelm Stasch.
