= Huuskonen =

Huuskonen is a Finnish surname. Notable people with the surname include:

- Kalevi Huuskonen (1932–1999), Finnish biathlete
- Veikko Huuskonen (1910–1973), Finnish boxer
