= Szapsel Rotholc =

Polish boxer (1913–1996)

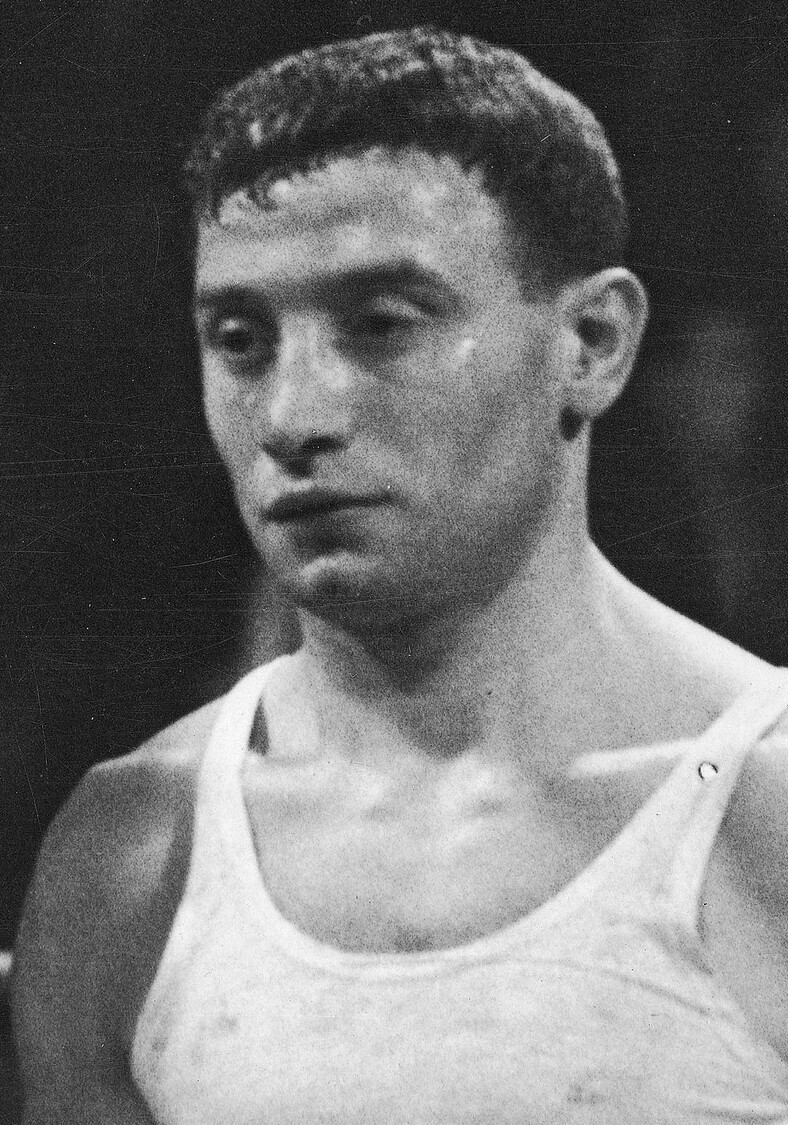

Personal information
- Born: 2 July 1913 Warsaw, Poland
- Died: 29 February 1996 (aged 83) Montreal, Canada

Boxing career
Medal record
Men's amateur boxing
Representing Poland
European Amateur Championships
Bronze medal – third place	1934 Budapest	Middleweight

Szapsel Rotholc (July 2, 1913 – 29 February 1996) was a Polish boxer.

Born into a Jewish family in Warsaw, he was a member of the Gwiazda Warszawa Boxing Club in 1929–1939. He won the bronze medal in the Flyweight class at the 1934 European Amateur Boxing Championships in Budapest. In 1933 he won the Polish champion title. He represented Poland in many matches: POL vs. HUN (1934, 1935), POL vs. USA (1934), POL vs. CZE (1934), POL vs. GER (1934, 1935, 1938), POL vs. NOR (1937), POL vs. DEN (1937), POL vs. ITA (1938), POL vs. FRA (1938), POL vs. SUI (1938), POL vs. EST (1938), POL vs. SWE (1939), POL vs. FIN (1939), scoring +15 –0 =1. He played also for Warsaw in duals against Dublin (1937), Vienna (1939) and Italy (1939), scoring +2 –1 =0. Rotholc won all fights except two, one drew and one loss with an Italian boxer Guido Nardecchia.

Rotholc took 10th and 6th places, respectively in 1934 and 1935, in the Polish Sportspersonality of the Year, chosen by the readers of the newspaper Przegląd Sportowy.

During the Nazi occupation in World War II, he lived and survived in the Warsaw Ghetto as a Jewish policeman. After the war he lived in Łódź until 1949, when he departed for Canada.
