= Frederick Simpson (boxer) =

British boxer

Freddie Simpson
Personal information
- Nationality: British (English)
- Born: 18 June 1916 Basingstoke, Hampshire, England
- Died: 23 December 1974 (aged 58) Basingstoke, Hampshire, England

Sport
- Sport: boxing

Frederick John Simpson (18 June 1916 – 23 December 1974) was a British boxer who competed in the 1936 Summer Olympics. He fought as Freddie Simpson. In 1936 he was eliminated in the first round of the lightweight class after losing his fight to Andy Scrivani.

He won the 1936 Amateur Boxing Association British lightweight title, when boxing out of the Battersea ABC.
