= Marino Facchin =

Italian boxer (1913–1979)

Mario Facchin (20 February 1913 – 29 May 1979) was an Italian boxer who competed in the 1936 Summer Olympics. He won once and was on the podium another time at the European Men's Amateur Boxing Championships. He was born in Bagnolo di Po.

At the 1934 European Amateur Boxing Championships, he won gold in the lightweight class. At the 1936 Summer Olympics, he was eliminated in the second round of the lightweight class after losing his fight to the upcoming bronze medalist Erik Ågren. At the 1937 European Amateur Boxing Championships he won the bronze medal, again in the lightweight class.
