= Leo Ågren =

Finland-Swedish author (1928–1984)

Karl Leo Johannes Ågren (26 July 1928 – 6 June 1984) was a Finland-Swedish author. He was brother to Erik, Gösta and Inga Ågren. He married Maj-Britt Bergström in 1962.

== Life ==
Ågren was born in Nykarleby, the son of Rudolf Filemon Ågren, a farmer and worker, and Olga Elisabet Rosenblad. After completing middle school, he trained as a typographer and worked in this profession in Nykarleby until 1948. From 1951 to 1960, he worked in Jakobstad, where he also served as a reviewer for Jakobstads Tidning. He later relocated to Stockholm, Sweden, where he was employed as a typographer at Dagens Nyheter from 1964 to 1976. He debuted with the novel Hunger i skördetid, which focuses on the lives of tenant farmers (Swedish: Torpare) in Swedish Ostrobothnia. Kungsådern, När gudarna dör, and Fädrens blod is a historical trilogy about forest tenant farmers from the beginning of the 18th century until the war in 1918.

Ågren died in Stockholm at the age of 55 in 1984.

== Bibliography ==
- Hunger i skördetid, 1954 (Schildts & Co., Porvoo)
- Motsols, 1955 (continuation of Hunger i skördetid, Schildts & Co., Jakobstad)
- Farsarvet, 1956
- Kungsådern, 1957 (Schildts & Co., Porvoo)
- När gudarna dör, 1959 (Schildts & Co., Jakobstad)
- Stämmor i nordannatten, 1960 (poetry, Schildts & Co., Tampere)
- Fädrens blod, 1961 (Schildts & Co., Porvoo)
- Ballad, 1962 (Schildts & Co., Tampere)
- Sällsamt skratta de döda, 1963–1964
- Krigshistoria, 1971 (Författarlaget, Gothenburg)

== Literature ==
- Britt Ågren: En bok om Leo. 1996 (A Book About Leo [en])
- Gösta Ågren: En man gick genom stormen: Leo Ågrens liv och diktning. 1983. (A Man Walked Through the Storm: Leo Ågren's Life and Poetry/Writings[en])
- Mauritz Edström: ''Rättsida på Finlands avigsida.'' Studiekamraten 54/1972, pp. 21–24. (The Right Side of Finland's Wrong Side [en])
