= Tinus Lambillion =

Dutch boxer

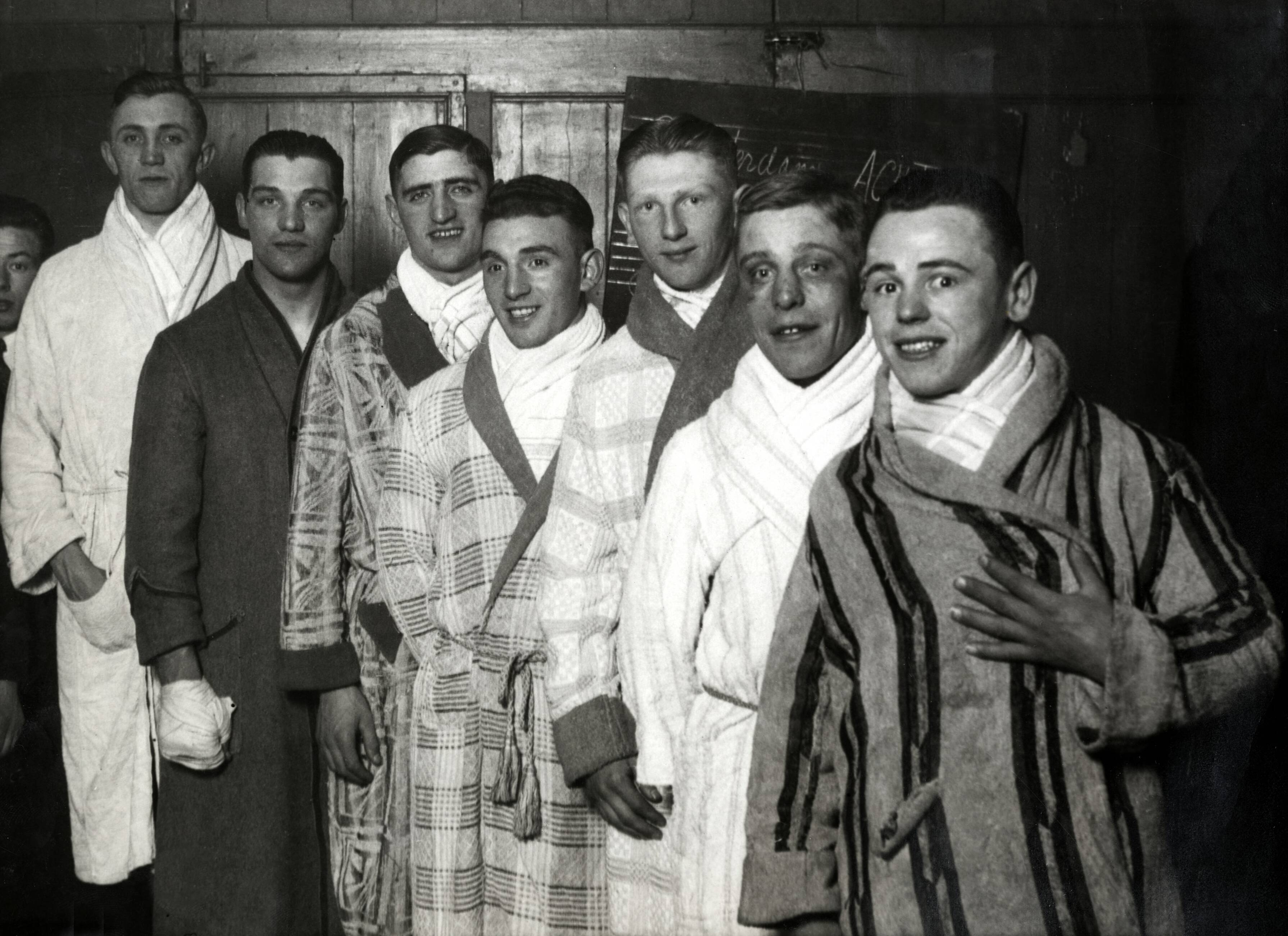
Dutch boxers 1932: (left to right) Wigman, Kiks, Ben Bril, Rieger, Jan Nicolaas, Jan Nieuwenburg & Lambillion

Martinus "Tinus" Lambillion (August 17, 1912 – January 18, 1994) was a Dutch boxer who competed in the 1936 Summer Olympics.

He was born and died in Rotterdam.

In 1936 he was eliminated in the first round of the flyweight class after losing his fight to the upcoming silver medalist Gavino Matta.
