= Alois Swatosch =

Austrian boxer

Alois Swatosch (27 August 1910 – 16 January 1987) was an Austrian boxer who competed in the 1936 Summer Olympics. In 1936 he was eliminated in the first round of the lightweight class after losing his fight to Simon Dewinter.
