= Vilmos Énekes =

Hungarian boxer

Vilmos Énekes (28 February 1915 – 7 December 1990) was a Hungarian boxer. He won the gold medal in the Flyweight division at the 1937 European Amateur Boxing Championships in Milan. Vilmos was the younger brother of István Énekes.
