= Constantin David =

Constantin David may refer to:

- Constantin David (activist) (1908–1941), Romanian political activist
- Constantin David (boxer) (1912-?), Romanian boxer
- Constantin J. David (1886–1964), German actor and director
