= Remi Lescrauwaet =

Belgian boxer

Remi Lescrauwaet (6 September 1915 – 11 September 1944) was a Belgian boxer who competed in the 1936 Summer Olympics. In 1936 he was eliminated in the second round of the featherweight class after losing his fight to the eventual bronze medalist Josef Miner.
