= Andy Scrivani =

American boxer

Andrew Francis Scrivani (March 28, 1917 – June 1, 2015) was an American boxer who competed in the 1936 Summer Olympics. He was born in Chicago. In 1936 he was eliminated in the quarter-finals of the lightweight class after losing his fight to the upcoming bronze medalist Erik Ågren.
