= Dioști =

- Commune
- Location in Romania
- Coordinates: 44°7′N 24°11′E
- Country: Romania
- County: Dolj
- Area: 62.74 km^{2} (24.22 sq mi)
- Population (2021-12-01): 2,534
  - Density: 40.39/km^{2} (104.6/sq mi)
- Time zone: UTC+02:00 (EET)
  - Summer (DST): UTC+03:00 (EEST)
- Vehicle reg.: DJ

Dioști is a commune in Dolj County, Oltenia, Romania with a population of 3,054 people in 2011. It is composed of three villages: Ciocănești, Dioști, and Radomir.

== Natives ==
- Nicolae Berechet (1915–1936), boxer
