= Arturo Paoletti =

Italian boxer

Arturo Paoletti (born 10 August 1918, date of death unknown) was an Italian boxer. He was born in Mira, Veneto.

He won thrice the Italian championships at Ferrara 1937, Terni 1941, and Viareggio 1942, and won the gold medal in the Bantamweight class at the 1942 European Amateur Boxing Championships in Breslau. Between 1936 and 1942 he was on the Italian national team 13 times, scoring +10 –2 =1.

As a professional boxer, he was an Italian champion in the bantamweight class in 1945–1946. The Arturo Paoletti Memorial is a boxing tournament played in his honour in Verona.
