= Frigyes Kubinyi =

Hungarian boxer

Frigyes Kubinyi (March 23, 1909 – August 17, 1948) was a Hungarian boxer who competed in the 1936 Summer Olympics.

In 1936 he was eliminated in the second round of the bantamweight class after losing his fight to the upcoming gold medalist Ulderico Sergo.
