= Franciszek Szymura =

Polish boxer (1912–1985)

Personal information
- Nationality: Polish
- Born: 7 December 1912 Dortmund, Germany
- Died: 18 May 1985 (aged 73) Warsaw, Poland

Boxing career
Medal record
Men's amateur boxing
Representing Poland
European Amateur Championships
Silver medal – second place	1937 Milan	Light Heavyweight
Silver medal – second place	1939 Dublin	Light Heavyweight

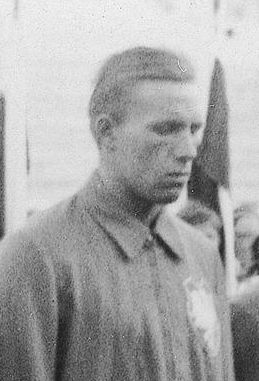
Szymura in 1935

Franciszek Szymura (7 December 1912 – 18 May 1985) was a Polish boxer who competed four times in the European Amateur Boxing Championships (1937, 1939, 1947, and 1949) and in the 1948 Summer Olympics.

He won twice the silver medal in the 1937 European Amateur Boxing Championships in Milan and the 1939 European Amateur Boxing Championships in Dublin, lost twice by Luigi Musina, the upcoming professional European champion (1942–1947). At the 1948 Summer Olympics in London, he was eliminated in the quarterfinals of the Light heavyweight class after losing his fight to the upcoming bronze medalist Mauro Cia.

He was also a basketball player and represented Poland at the EuroBasket 1946.
