= Oscar de Larrazábal =

Filipino boxer

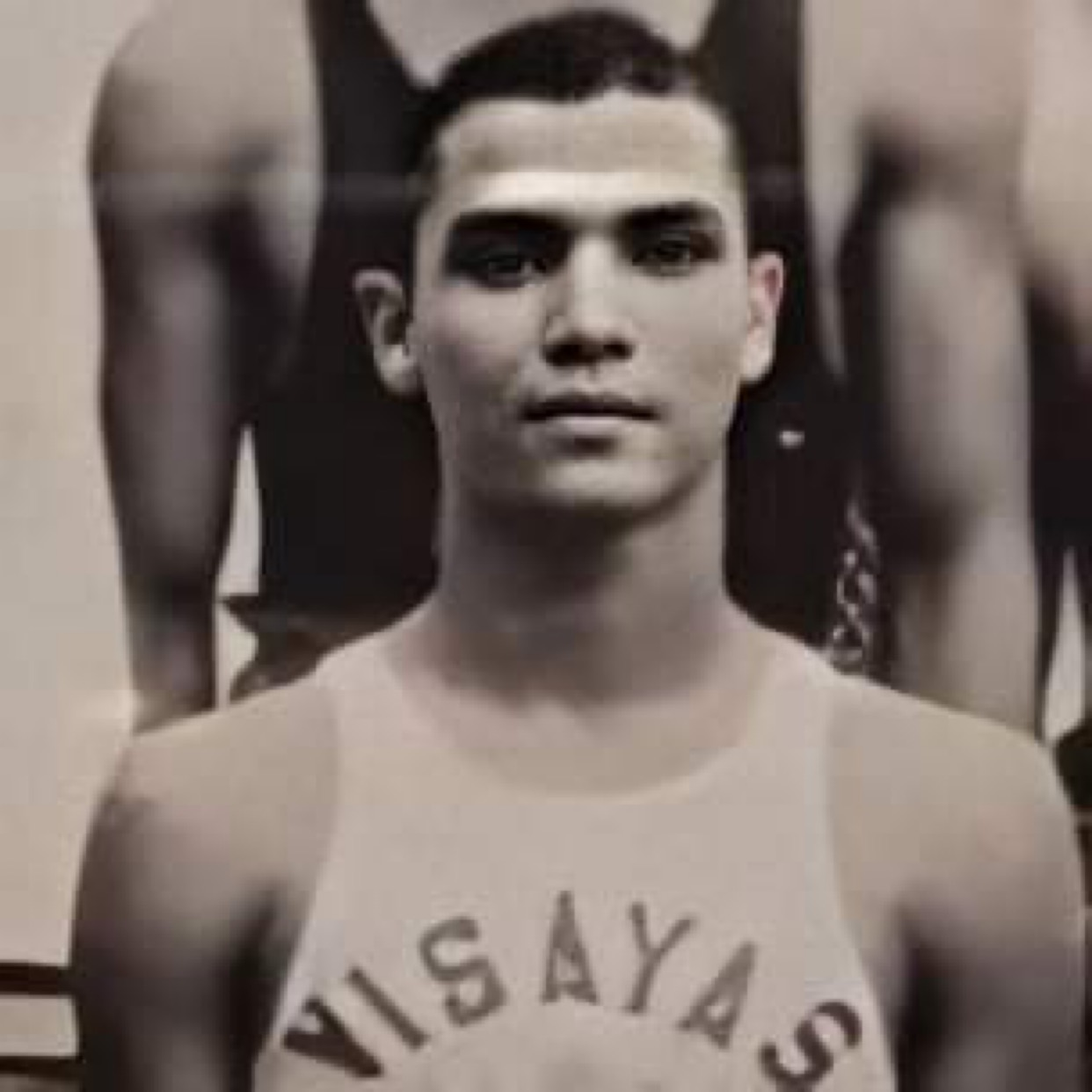
De Larrazábal

Oscar Sanchez de Larrazábal (June 8, 1916 – February 5, 1978) was a Filipino boxer who competed in the 1936 Summer Olympics. In 1936 he was eliminated in the quarter-finals of the bantamweight class after losing his fight to eventual silver medalist Jack Wilson.

De Larrazábal graduated from the Far Eastern University earning a law degree. He passed bar examination in 1948. He worked for PhilAm insurance firm and assisted aspiring Filipino emigrants to the United States.
