= Khalil Amira El-Maghrabi =

Egyptian boxer

Personal information
- Nationality: Egyptian
- Born: January 1, 1914
- Died: May 26, 1976 (aged 62)

Sport
- Sport: Boxing
- Weight class: Featherweight

Achievements and titles
- Olympic finals: 1936

Khalil Amira El-Maghrabi (January 1, 1914 – May 26, 1976) was an Egyptian boxer. He competed in the 1936 Summer Olympics.

== Career ==
In 1936, El-Maghrabi was eliminated in the first round of the featherweight class, after having lost his fight to eventual bronze medalist Josef Miner.
