= Svatoš =

Svatoš (Czech and Slovak feminine: Svatošová) is a surname. Notable people with this surname include:

- Adam Svatoš (born 1979), Czech musician
- Jan Svatoš (1910–unknown), Czech cross-country skier
- Marek Svatoš (1982–2016), Slovak ice hockey player

== See also ==
- Swatosch
