= Arquímedes Arrieta =

Uruguayan boxer (1918–1937)

Arquímedes Arrieta (1 May 1918 – 1 January 1937) was a Uruguayan boxer who competed in the 1936 Summer Olympics. In 1936 he was eliminated in the second round of the featherweight class after losing his fight to John Treadaway. Arrieta was murdered on 1 January 1937, at the age of 18.
