= Poul Kops =

Danish boxer (1915–2000)

Poul Børge Kops (September 19, 1915 – February 23, 2000) was a Danish boxer who competed in the 1936 Summer Olympics. He was born in Pedersborg, Sorø municipality and was the older brother of Ebbe Kops. In 1936 he finished fourth in the lightweight class. He lost in the semi-finals to the upcoming gold medalist Imre Harangi and was not able to compete in the bronze medal bout with Erik Ågren.
