= František Doležal =

Czechoslovak boxer

František Doležal (born November 23, 1913, date of death unknown) was a Czech boxer who competed in the 1936 Summer Olympics for Czechoslovakia. In 1936 he was eliminated in the first round of the bantamweight class after losing his fight to Albert Barnes.
