= Åke Karlsson =

Finnish boxer

Åke Aleksej Karlsson (16 August 1911, Turku – 12 February 1958) was a Finnish boxer who competed in the 1936 Summer Olympics.

He was born and died in Turku and was also known under the name Keiras.

In 1936 he was eliminated in the second round of the featherweight class after losing his fight to the upcoming gold medalist Oscar Casanovas.

== 1936 Olympic results ==
Below is the record of Åke Karlsson, a Finnish featherweight boxer who competed at the 1936 Berlin Olympics:

- Round of 32: defeated Clarrie Gordon (New Zealand) on points
- Round of 16: lost to Oscar Casanovas (Argentina) on points
