= Nicolae Berechet =

Romanian boxer

Nicolae Berechet (April 16, 1915 – August 19, 1936) was a Romanian boxer who competed in the 1936 Summer Olympics. He was born in Dioști, Dolj County. On August 11, 1936 he was eliminated in the first round of the featherweight class after losing his fight to Evald Seeberg.

After losing his match, he developed a carbuncle which quickly spread into blood poisoning. Due to the lack of usage of antibiotics in 1936, he died only three days after his fight. German authorities refused his repatriation and he was buried in Berlin.
