= José Vergara (boxer) =

Chilean boxer

José del transito Vergara Agulera (August 15, 1915 – ) was a Chilean boxer who competed in the 1936 Summer Olympics.

In 1936 he was eliminated in the second round of the bantamweight class after losing his fight to Joseph Cornelis.
