= Ferdinand Raeschke =

German boxer

Ferdinand (Ferdi) Raeschke (February 19, 1920 Hamburg – June 16, 1987 Hamburg) was a professional German boxer and, after his active boxing career, owned the beer tavern "Bei Ferry" at the corner of Seilerstrasse / Detlev-Bremer-Strasse inside the famous entertainment quarter of St. Pauli, Hamburg.

== Career ==
Raeschke won the 22nd German National Championships in 1941, and won the gold medal, defeating Július Torma (HUN), Borje Wretman (SWE), and Lajos Szentgyorgy (HUN), in the Welterweight class at the 1942 European Amateur Boxing Championships in Breslau. In 1940–1941, he was on the German national team 8 times, scoring +6 –2 =0. He took 2nd place in the 25th German National Championships in April 1944. As a professional boxer, he won 39, lost 6, and drawn 12, in the period of 1945–1950.
