= Carlos Lillo =

Chilean boxer

Carlos Lillo (October 12, 1915 – October 14, 1964) was a Chilean boxer, who competed in the 1936 Summer Olympics. In 1936, he was eliminated in the quarter-finals of the lightweight class, after losing his fight to the upcoming silver medalist Nikolai Stepulov. Due to a scoring miscalculation, Thomas Hamilton-Brown was eliminated until the error was discovered several days later.
