= Kosta Hakim =

Egyptian boxer (born 1917)

Kosta Hakim (born 17 April 1917, date of death unknown) was an Egyptian boxer who competed in the 1936 Summer Olympics. He was born in Alexandria.

In the Olympic Games, he lost to Carlos Lillo in the second round of the lightweight class. Hakim is deceased.
