= Clarrie Gordon =

New Zealand boxer (1917–1983)

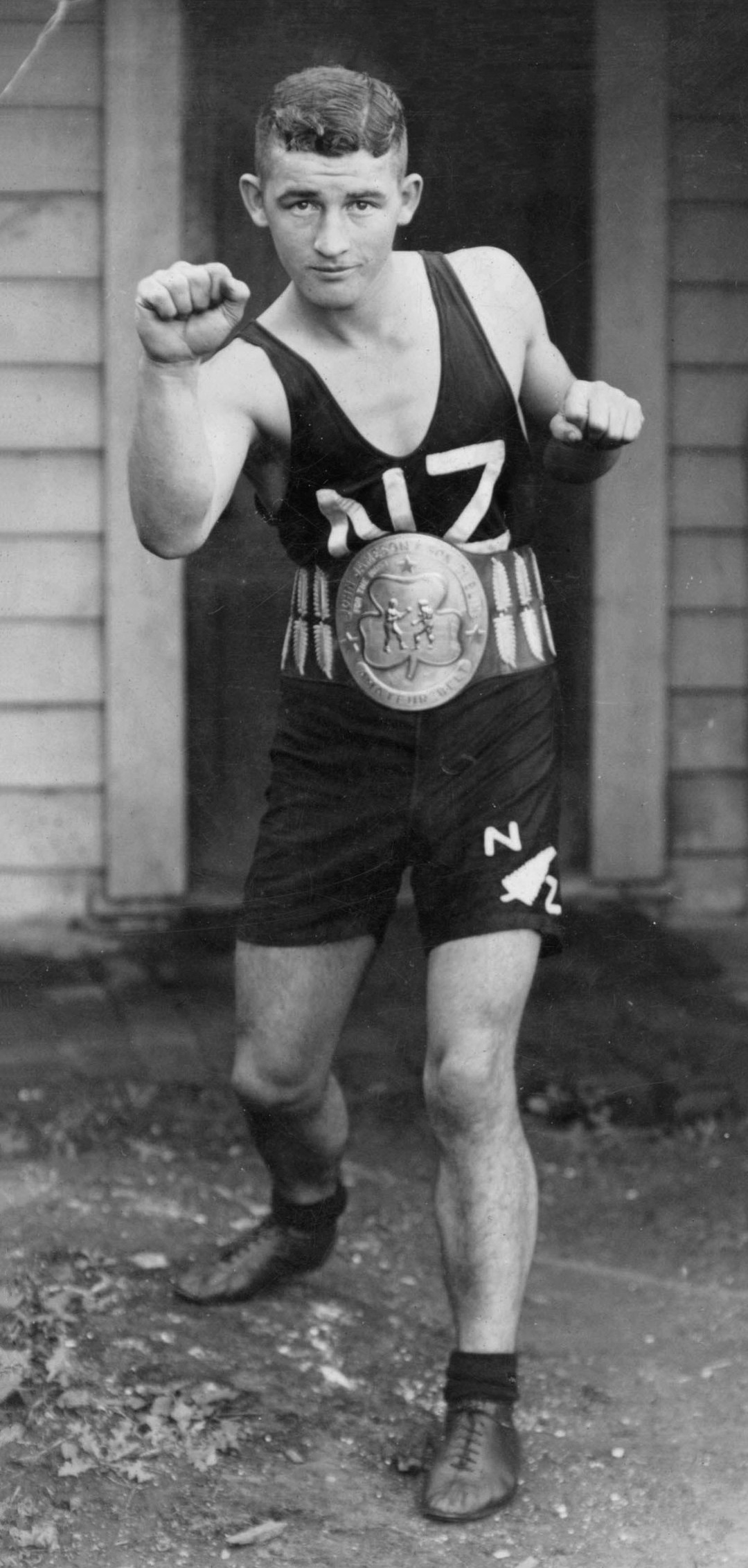
- Gordon c. 1936

Personal information
- Born: 9 March 1917 Pātea, New Zealand
- Died: 19 November 1983 (aged 66) Auckland, New Zealand

Sport
- Sport: Boxing

Clarence "Clarrie" Edward Gordon (9 March 1917 – 19 November 1983) was a New Zealand boxer. He competed as a featherweight at the 1936 Summer Olympics, where he was eliminated in his first bout. At 19 years, he was the youngest competitor from New Zealand at those Games.

In 1938, Gordon turned professional, and retired in 1949 as a reigning national welterweight champion. He had a record of 22 wins (11 by knockout), 11 losses, and 2 draws. In 1944, he was suspended for three years by the New Zealand Professional Boxing Association after a first-round knockout. During those years, he fought in Australia.

Clarrie had nine siblings; among them six of the seven brothers became career boxers, including Clarrie's twin brother Viv.
