= Luigi Musina =

Italian boxer (1914–1990)

Luigi Musina (17 April 1914, in Gorizia – 10 February 1990, in Cormons) was an Italian boxer. He won the 1937 European Amateur Boxing Championships in Milan, Italy and the 1939 European Amateur Boxing Championships in Dublin, Ireland winning the final fights against Franciszek Szymura. Musina fought in several duals: ITA vs. HUN (1936), Europe vs. USA (1936, 1937, 1939), ITA vs. USA (1937), ITA vs. POL (1938, 1939), ITA vs. GER (1938, 1939, 1940), scoring +13 –1 =0.

In April 1940 he won the first professional bout of his career. In April 1942 he became the European champion in the Light heavyweight class, and held the title until 1947. Musina ended the career of former world heavyweight champion Primo Carnera. Carnera was attempting a comeback after World War II and had won two straight matches. However, after losing two decisions and being stopped by Musina, Carnera retired.
