= Felipe Gabuco =

Filipino boxer

Felipe Sevilla Gabuco (May 26, 1916 – February 23, 1986 in Makati) was a Filipino boxer who competed in the 1936 Summer Olympics. In 1936 he was eliminated in the first round of the featherweight class after losing his fight to Theodore Kara.

== 1936 Olympic results ==
Below is the record of Felipe Gabuco, a Filipino featherweight boxer who competed at the 1936 Berlin Olympics:

- Round of 32: lost to Theodore Kara (United States) referee stopped contest in the third round
