= Oscar Casanovas =

Argentine boxer

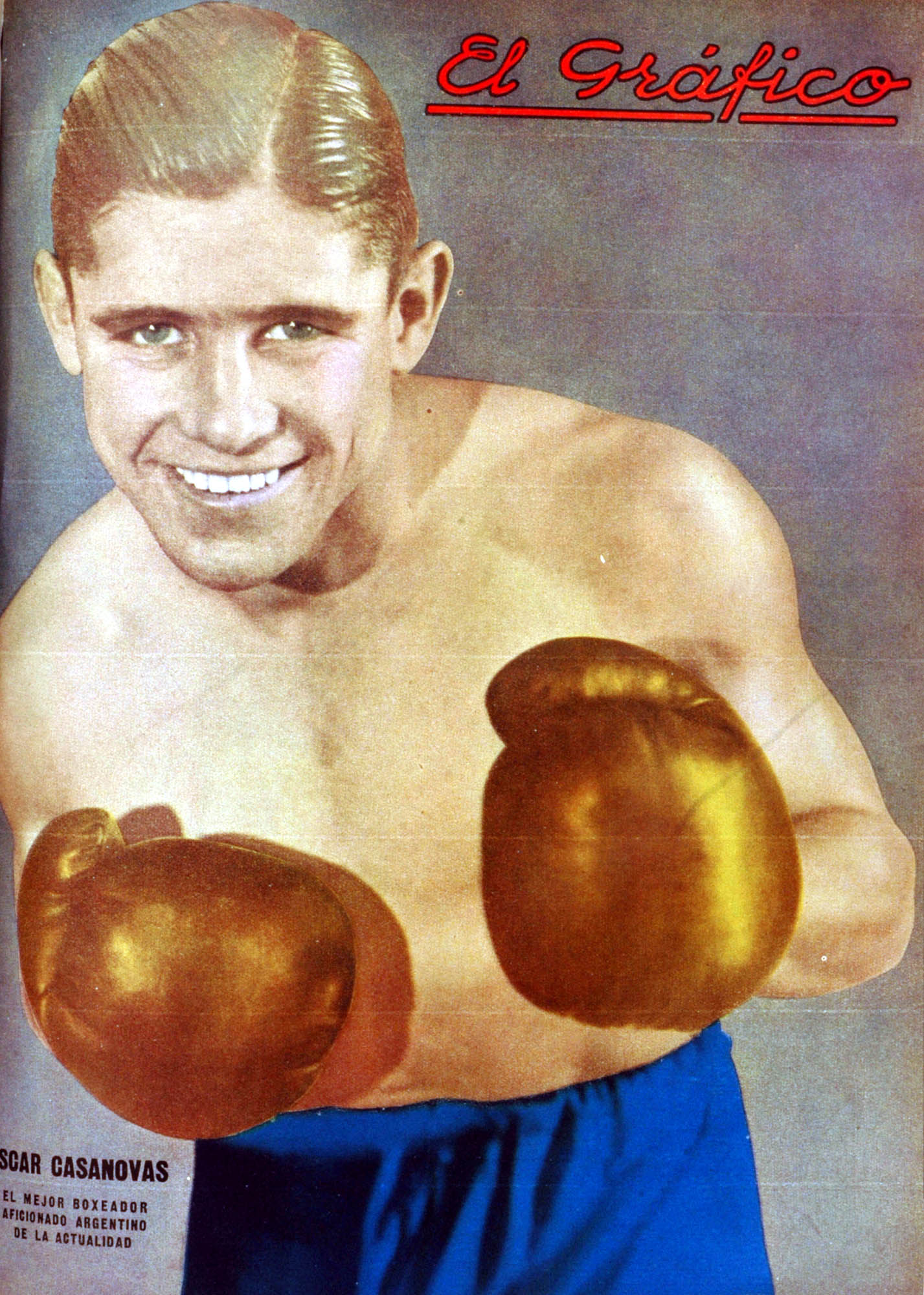
- Casanovas on the cover of El Gráfico.

Personal information
- Born: May 15, 1914 Avellaneda, Argentina
- Died: May 1987 (aged 72–73)
Medal record
Men's Boxing
Representing Argentina
Olympic Games
Gold medal – first place	1936 Berlin	Featherweight

Oscar Casanovas (May 15, 1914 – 1987) was an Argentine boxer who competed in the 1936 Summer Olympics.

== Amateur career ==
In 1936 he won the gold medal in the featherweight class after winning the final against Charles Catterall.

=== Olympic results ===
- Round of 32: bye
- Round of 16: Defeated Åke Karlsson (Finland) points
- Quarterfinal: Defeated Aleksander Polus (Poland) points
- Semifinal: Defeated Dezső Frigyes (Hungary) points
- Final: Defeated Charles Catterall (South Africa) points (won gold medal)
