= Norman Fisher (boxer) =

New Zealand boxer

Norm Fisher
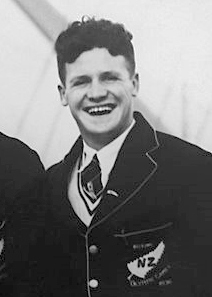
- Fisher in 1936

Personal information
- Born: 8 March 1916 Christchurch, New Zealand
- Died: 12 February 1991 (aged 74)

Sport
- Sport: Boxing

Norman Heaton Fisher (8 March 1916 – 12 February 1991) was a New Zealand boxer. He competed as a lightweight in the 1936 Summer Olympics, where he was eliminated in his first bout.

== 1936 Olympic results ==
Below is the record of Norman Fisher, a New Zealand lightweight boxer who competed at the 1936 Berlin Olympics:

- Round of 32: bye
- Round of 16: lost to Lidoro Oliver (Argentina) by decision

In 1938 he turned professional and retired in 1944 after compiling a career record of six wins and three losses. In 1940 he attempted to win the New Zealand Welterweight Title, but lost by knockout.
