= Otto Kästner =

German boxer (1909–2002)

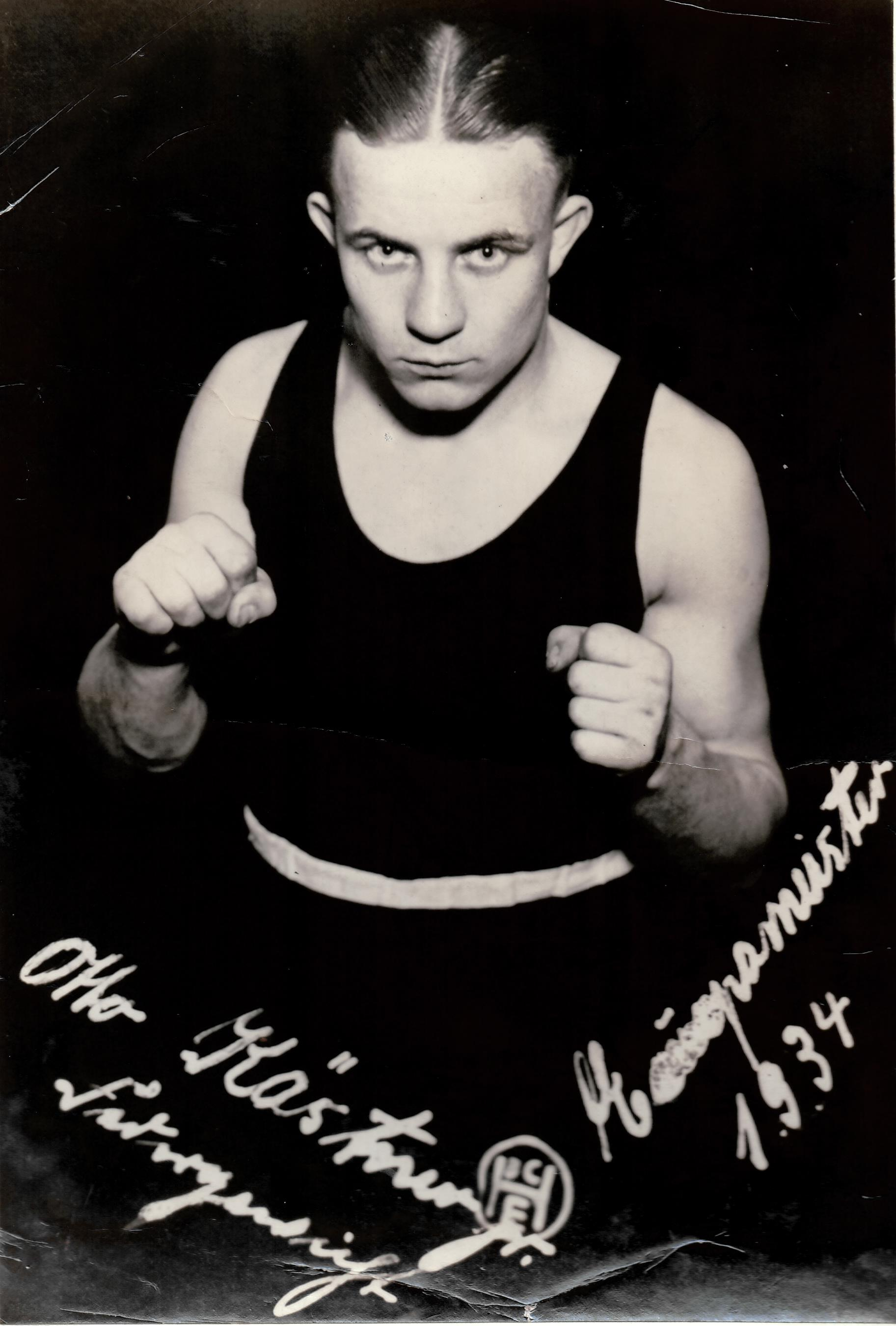
- Kästner in 1934

Personal information
- Nationality: Germany
- Born: Otto Kästner Jr. 1 August 1909 Mohlsdorf, Thuringia, Germany
- Died: 2002 (aged 92–93)
- Weight: Featherweight

Boxing career
Medal record
Men's amateur boxing
Representing Germany
European Championships
Gold medal – first place	1934 Budapest	Featherweight

Otto Kästner (1 August 1909 – 2002) was a German boxer. He competed at the 1934 European Amateur Boxing Championships, winning the gold medal in the featherweight event.
