= Aleksander Polus =

Polish boxer

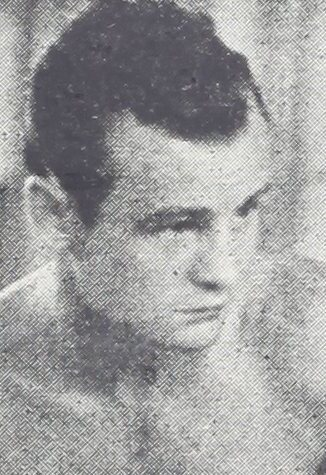

Personal information
- Born: 1 February 1914 Dortmund, Germany
- Died: 1965 (aged 51) Poznań, Poland

Boxing career
Medal record
Men's amateur boxing
Representing Poland
European Amateur Championships
Gold medal – first place	1937 Milan	Featherweight

Aleksander Józef Polus (February 1, 1914 – February 13, 1965) was a Polish boxer who competed in the 1936 Summer Olympics.

He was born in Dortmund, German Empire and died in Poznań.

In 1936, he was eliminated in the quarterfinals of the featherweight class after losing his fight to the eventual gold medalist Oscar Casanovas.

== 1936 Olympic results ==
Below is the record of Aleksander Polus, a Polish featherweight boxer who competed at the 1936 Berlin Olympics:

- Round of 32: bye
- Round of 16: bye
- Quarterfinal: lost to Oscar Casanovas (Argentina) on points
