= 1942 European Amateur Boxing Championships =

Boxing competitions

- Host city: Breslau
- Country: Germany
- Nations: 11
- Athletes: 97
- Dates: 20–25 January

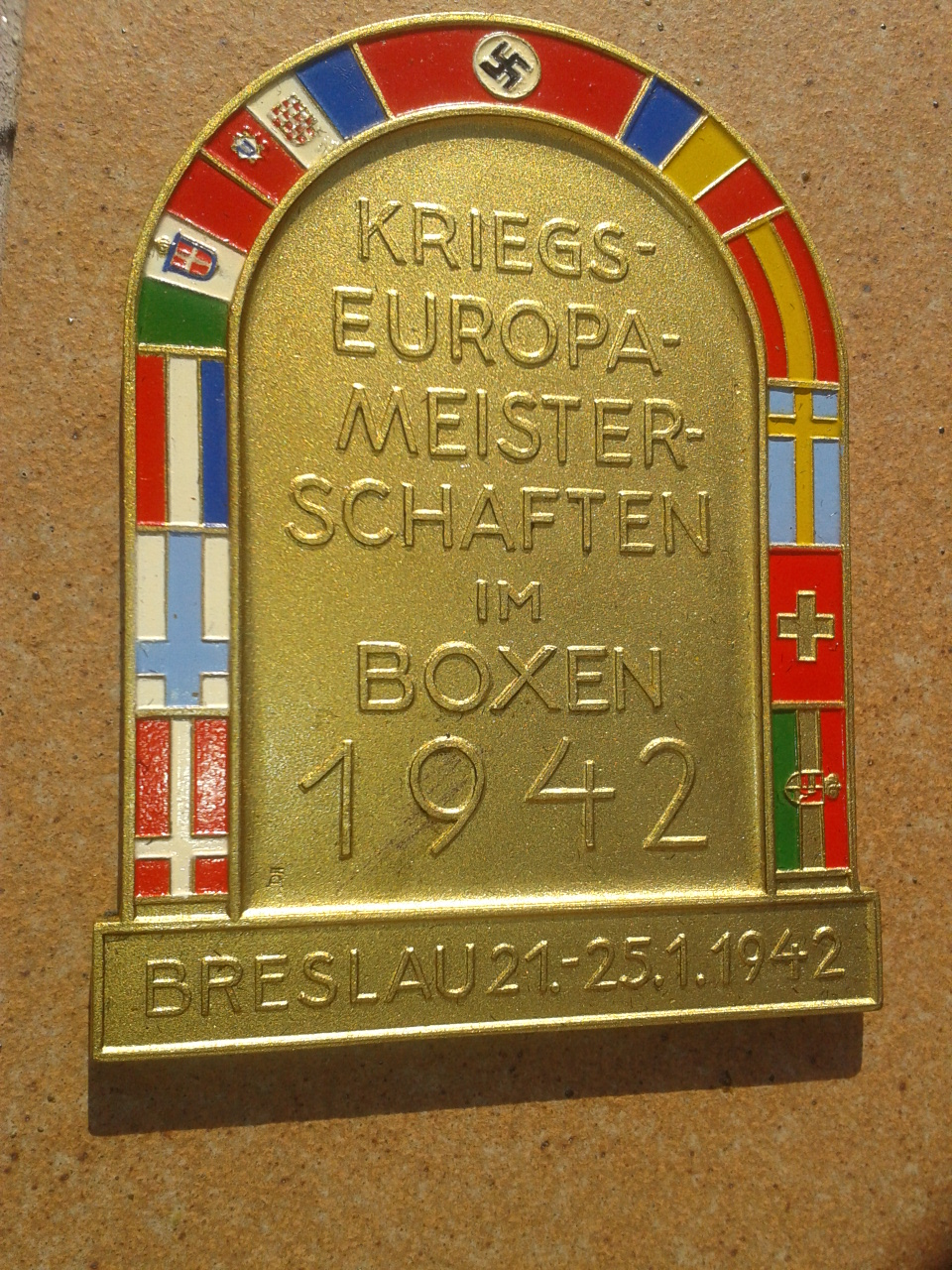
Commemorative coin of this event.

The 1942 European Amateur Boxing Championships were held in Breslau, Germany from 20 to 25 January. There were 97 fighters from 11 countries participating: Germany, Hungary, and Italy (16 boxers in each squad), and Croatia, Denmark, Finland, Netherlands, Slovakia, Spain, Sweden, Switzerland. After World War II, the results were annulled by AIBA.

== Medal winners ==
Event	Gold	Silver	Bronze
Flyweight (– 50.8 kilograms)	Constante Paesani; Italy	Amleto Falcinelli; Italy	Mariano Diaz Mendez; Spain
Bantamweight (– 53.5 kilograms)	Arturo Paoletti; Italy	Ian Friedman; Spain	Stig Kreuger; Sweden
Featherweight (– 57.1 kilograms)	Dezső Frigyes; Hungary	Artur Buettner; Germany	Ermano Bonetti; Italy
Lightweight (– 61.2 kilograms)	Duilio Bianchini; Italy	Florindo Tiberi; Italy	Heinz Gorczyca; Germany
Welterweight (– 66.7 kilograms)	Ferdinand Raeschke; Germany	Lajos Szentgyorgy; Hungary	Börje Wretman; Sweden
Middleweight (– 72.6 kilograms)	Karl Gustaf Noren; Sweden	Adolf Baumgarten; Germany	Carl Schmidt; Germany
Light Heavyweight (– 79.4 kilograms)	Svend Aage Christensen; Denmark	Otto Proffitlich; Germany	Rudolf Pepper; Germany
Heavyweight (+ 79.4 kilograms)	Hein ten Hoff; Germany	Richard Grupe; Germany	Gino Latini; Italy

== Medal table ==
Rank	Nation	Gold	Silver	Bronze	Total
1	Italy (ITA)	3	2	2	7
2	Germany (GER)	2	4	3	9
3	Hungary (HUN)	1	1	0	2
4	Sweden (SWE)	1	0	2	3
5	Denmark (DEN)	1	0	0	1
6	Spain (ESP)	0	1	1	2
Totals (6 entries)		8	8	8	24
