= Alfredo Petrone =

Uruguayan boxer (born 1918)

Alfredo Petrone (25 February 1917 – 24 July 2004) was a Uruguayan boxer who competed in the 1936 Summer Olympics.

In 1936 he was eliminated in the second round of the bantamweight class after losing his fight to the upcoming silver medalist Jack Wilson.
