= Joseph Cornelis =

Belgian boxer

Joseph Cornelis (17 November 1917 – 2000) was a Belgian boxer who competed in the 1936 Summer Olympics. He was eliminated in a quarterfinal bout of the bantamweight class after losing his fight to the eventual gold medalist Ulderico Sergo.

== 1936 Olympic results ==
Below are the results of Joseph Cornelis, a Belgian bantamweight boxer who competed at the 1936 Berlin Olympics:

- Round of 32: bye
- Round of 16: defeated Jose Vergara (Chile) by decision
- Quarterfinal: lost to Ulderico Sergo (Italy) by decision
