= Wilhelm Stasch =

German boxer

Wilhelm Stasch (March 12, 1911 – August 4, 1989) was a German boxer who competed in the 1936 Summer Olympics. He was born in Kray. In 1936 he was eliminated in the second round of the bantamweight class after losing his fight to Oscar de Larrazábal. Stasch's career lasted nearly 30 years with almost 700 fights. He was the German national champion in 1936.
