= Thomas Hamilton-Brown =

South African boxer (1916–1981)

Personal information
- Born: 1 July 1916 Cape Town, South Africa
- Died: 2 March 1981 (aged 64) Cape Town, South Africa

Boxing career

Thomas Hamilton-Brown (1 July 1916 – 2 March 1981) was a South African boxer who competed in the 1936 Summer Olympics.

Hamilton-Brown was born in Cape Town. In 1936 he was eliminated in the first round of the lightweight class after losing his fight to Carlos Lillo. He had originally won the bout but due to a scoring miscalculation he did not find this out until several days later, when he had gone on an eating binge and was too heavy for his weight class. Hamilton-Brown died in Cape Town on 2 March 1981, at the age of 64.
