= Jan Nicolaas =

Dutch boxer

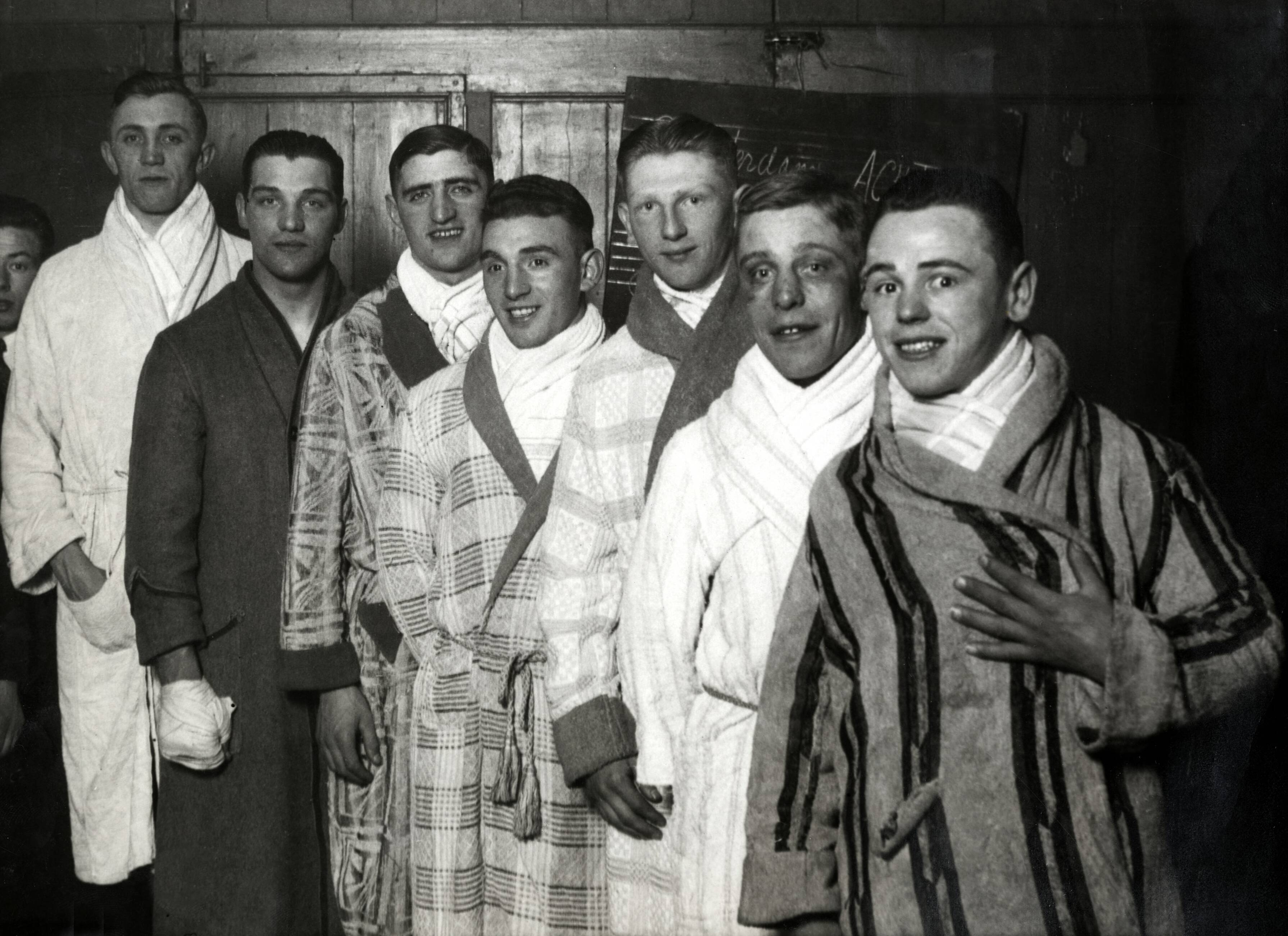
Dutch boxers 1932: (left to right) Wigman, Jan Kiks, Ben Bril, Rieger, Jan Nicolaas, Jan Nieuwenburg & Tinus Lambillion

Johannes Gerardus "Jan" Nicolaas (20 October 1912 – 28 November 2001) was a Dutch boxer who competed in the 1936 Summer Olympics.

He was born in The Hague and died in Rijswijk.

In 1936 he was eliminated in the second round of the featherweight class after losing his fight to the upcoming silver medalist Charles Catterall of South Africa.

== 1936 Olympic results ==
Below is the record of Jan Nicolaas, a Dutch featherweight boxer who competed at the 1936 Berlin Olympics:

- Round of 32: defeated Sabino Islas (Mexico) on points
- Round of 16: lost to Charles Catterall (South Africa) on points
