= Nakamatsu =

Nakamatsu (written: 中松) is a Japanese surname. Notable people with the surname include:

- Jon Nakamatsu (born 1968), American classical pianist
- Yoshiro Nakamatsu (中松 義郎, born 1928), Japanese inventor
