= Erik Ågren (writer) =

Finnish translator and writer (1924–2008)

Erik Ågren (4 August 1924 – 12 March 2008) was a Finland-Swedish translator and writer.

Born in Nykarleby with Swedish as his native language, Ågren is the son of the farmer and worker Rudolf Filemon Ågren and Olga Elisabet Rosenblad. He was the brother of Gösta and Leo Ågren. Ågren first married Doris Finnäs and was later married to the writer Carita Nyström. He had three daughters and a son.

At the age of thirteen, Ågren became a lumberjack, then he participated in the Continuation War. Ågren worked for over thirty years as a construction worker, janitor, road worker, farmhand and foundry worker before taking final payment from Wärtsilä's foundry in Jakobstad in 1971 to become a freelance writer. In the early 1980s, he settled in Korsnäs and in 1984 he founded the publishing house Hantverk with his wife Carita Nyström.

In 1973, Ågren made his debut with the novel Sårad, a reckoning with war, hatred and cadaver discipline. Arbetslust and Modellfilare are based on life in the foundry. The novel Edvin depicts his own and his brothers' upbringing. The character Olga is a portrayal of his mother. He has also contributed to the collection Hurrarna (1974). Its title derives from "Hurrare", a derogatory Finnish word for Finnish Swedes.

Ågren died in Korsnäs at the age of 83 in 2008.

== Bibliography ==
- Wounded: A Continuation War Novel (1973)
- Lust for Work (1975)
- The Model Filer (1982)
- The Song of the Village (1983, lyric)
- Siv's Adventure (1984, children's book)
- The Wizard: Play for Radio (1986)
- The Buck Tab: A Fishing History (1987)
- Edwin: Novel (1991)
- Lappil and Other Stories (1994)
- Solvända: a dream book (1997)
- Olga: The Story of a Mother (2004)
