= Hidekichi Nagamatsu =

Japanese boxer

Hidekichi Nagamatsu (Japanese: 永松 英吉; August 4, 1914 – November 18, 1992) was a Japanese boxer who competed in the 1936 Summer Olympics.

In 1936 he was eliminated in the second round of the lightweight class after losing his fight to the upcoming silver medalist Nikolai Stepulov.
