= Antoni Czortek =

Polish boxer

Personal information
- Nationality: Polish
- Born: 2 July 1915 Buśnia, German empire
- Died: 2004 (aged 89) Radom, Poland
- Weight: bantamweight

Boxing career
Medal record
Men's amateur boxing
Representing Poland
European Amateur Championships
Silver medal – second place	1939 Dublin	Featherweight

Antoni "Kajtek" Czortek (Polish pronunciation: [anˈtɔɲi ˈt͡ʂɔrtɛk]; 1915–2004) was a Polish boxing champion, a legend in the sport. He was a 1939 silver medalist in the Amateur Championships of Europe, a multiple champion of Poland and a participant in the 1936 Olympic Games in Berlin. He is equally, if tragically, remembered for his heroic struggle for life in the Auschwitz concentration camp.

== Early years ==
Czortek was born on July 2, 1915, in Grudziądz (German: Graudenz), then part of the German Empire. He started his career in the local club GKS Grudziądz, but his talent was soon noticed in Warsaw. He moved to the capital of Poland and represented the team of Skoda Warszawa (team's name was in 1936 changed into Okęcie Warszawa). After World War II, he settled in Radom, where he fought for Radomiak Radom, and become a successful coach.

His name was widely known to boxing fans in Poland in the 1930s and late 1940s, as he participated in 23 official international boxing matches, winning eighteen fights, and losing four, with one tie. In 1936 he took part as a bantamweight in the Summer Olympic Games in Berlin. In the first round he beat French boxer Pierre Bonnet, but lost in the second to South African fighter Alec Hannan.

Czortek found greater success during the 1937 European Amateur Boxing Championships. That year, in Milan, Italy, he was fourth in the bantamweight, losing to future champion, Anton Osca from Romania. Two years later, during the 1939 European Amateur Boxing Championships in Dublin, he won silver, after beating Karl Käbi from Estonia and Lambert Genot from Belgium. In the final fight, Czortek lost to Patrick Dowdall from Ireland.

In the 1930s Czortek was a top boxer in his homeland. He won his first gold at the age of nineteen, in 1934 in Poznań. He was a champion of Poland three times in the interwar period (1934, 1938, 1939) (he would also win a national championships in 1949, after the war); he had numerous silver and bronze medals; he was second in the Polish championships in 1935 and 1948, and third in 1936.

== Fighting for his life in Auschwitz ==
During the Polish September Campaign, Czortek fought with his division near the border town of Wieluń. After Poland’s defeat, he returned to Warsaw, and hid there, using the name Antoni Kamiński.

The Gestapo were looking for him, and he eventually had to leave Warsaw and stay in the countryside near Grójec, with his wife’s family. Shot in the leg by a German patrol (he continued to limp for the rest of his life), Czortek was recognized and sent to Auschwitz. His heroic struggle for survival is still remembered in Poland. Czortek, who had the number 139559, was forced by the SS guards to participate in boxing matches. Altogether, he took part in fifteen fights there, most of them with much heavier inmates, and one with an SS trooper named Walter, this last fight was crucial, as if he were defeated, the Germans intended to kill him. In 1944 he was transferred to Mauthausen-Gusen, and in the spring of 1945 was freed by the Americans.

== After the war ==
Upon returning to Poland, Czortek settled back in Warsaw, but in 1947, after losing a fight to an unknown boxer from Częstochowa, he left the capital and moved to Radom.

As he later told reporters, he was too ashamed to stay in Warsaw after his unexpected loss, and gladly accepted the offer from Radom. His wife was a native of Warsaw and did not want to move, but they were promised a two-bedroom apartment and she relented.

Czortek fought until 1949, winning the Polish national championship. He then became a coach in Radom, teaching amongst others the Olympic champion Kazimierz Pazdzior. Czortek was well-respected and was made an honorary citizen of Radom, and was frequently invited to galas and banquets. In summer of 1978 Czortek had a cameo part in Polish boxing feature movie Clinch directed by Piotr Andrejew (film released in 1979).

Czortek died on January 15, 2004, in Radom, and is buried at a local cemetery.

== See also ==
- The Boxer and Death (1962)
- Triumph of the Spirit (1989)
- Tadeusz Pietrzykowski
- Harry Haft
- Salamo Arouch
