= 1939 European Amateur Boxing Championships =

Boxing competitions

- Host city: Dublin
- Country: Ireland
- Nations: 12
- Athletes: 71
- Dates: 18–22 April

The 1939 European Amateur Boxing Championships were held in Dublin, Ireland from 18 to 22 April. It was the sixth edition of the bi-annual competition was organised by the European governing body for amateur boxing, EABA. There were 71 fighters from 12 countries participating.

== Medal winners ==
Event	Gold	Silver	Bronze
Flyweight (– 50.8 kilograms)	(Republic of Ireland) Jimmy Ingle; Ireland	Nikolaus Obermauer; Germany	Guido Nardecchia; Italy
Bantamweight (– 53.5 kilograms)	Ulderico Sergo; Italy	Miksa Bondi; Hungary	Erich Wilke; Germany
Featherweight (– 57.1 kilograms)	(Republic of Ireland) Patrick Dowdall; Ireland	Antoni Czortek; Poland	Lambert Genot; Belgium
Lightweight (– 61.2 kilograms)	Herbert Nürnberg; Germany	Harald Kanepi; Estonia	Zbigniew Kowalski; Poland
Welterweight (– 66.7 kilograms)	Antoni Kolczyński; Poland	Erik Ågren; Sweden	(Republic of Ireland) Charles Evenden; Ireland
Middleweight (– 72.6 kilograms)	Anton Raadik; Estonia	Józef Pisarski; Poland	Oscar Ågren; Sweden
Light Heavyweight (– 79.4 kilograms)	Luigi Musina; Italy	Franciszek Szymura; Poland	Lajos Szigeti; Hungary
Heavyweight (+ 79.4 kilograms)	Olle Tandberg; Sweden	Nemesio Lazzari; Italy	Herbert Runge; Germany

== Medal table ==
Rank	Nation	Gold	Silver	Bronze	Total
1	Italy (ITA)	2	1	1	4
2	Ireland (IRL)	2	0	1	3
3	Poland (POL)	1	3	1	5
4	Germany (GER)	1	1	2	4
5	Sweden (SWE)	1	1	1	3
6	Estonia (EST)	1	1	0	2
7	Hungary (HUN)	0	1	1	2
8	Belgium (BEL)	0	0	1	1
Totals (8 entries)		8	8	8	24
