= Alec Hannan =

South African boxer

Alexander Irvine Hannan
- Born: 13 February 1916; Glasgow, Scotland
- Died: 31 March 2002
- Nationality: South African
- Statistics
- Weight class: Bantamweight

Alexander Irvine Hannan (13 February 1916 – 31 March 2002) was a South African boxer who competed in the 1936 Summer Olympics.

He was born in Glasgow, Scotland.

In 1936 he was eliminated in the quarterfinals of the bantamweight class after losing his fight to the upcoming bronze medalist Fidel Ortiz of Mexico.

== 1936 Olympic results ==
Below is the record of Alec Hannan, a South African bantamweight boxer who competed at the 1936 Berlin Olympics:

- Round of 32: defeated Veikko Huuskonen (Finland) on points
- Round of 16: defeated Antoni Czortek (Poland) on points
- Quarterfinal: lost to Fidel Ortiz (Mexico) on points
