= Herbert Nürnberg =

German boxer

Herbert Nürnberg (16 July 1914 – 24 June 1995) was a German boxer.

Born in Kiel, Nürnberg won four times the German Championship in the Lightweight class (1937, 1940, 1941, 1942) and took thrice the 2nd place (1939, 1943, 1944), won the International Tournament at Berlin 1937, won the International Meeting at Berlin 1938, and won twice the gold medal at the 1937 European Amateur Boxing Championships in Milan and the 1939 European Amateur Boxing Championships in Dublin.

Nuernberg represented Germany and Europe in many international matches in 1937–1943. In duals Europe vs. USA, he won twice in Chicago and Kansas City in 1937, and lost one at Chicago 1938. He played for Germany against the following countries: Italy, Hungary, Ireland, England, Austria, Poland, Sweden, Finland, Denmark, Bohemia & Moravia, Slovakia, Croatia, and Switzerland. After World War II, he started his professional boxing career in October 1945. His record: Won 51 (KOs 25), Lost 4, and Drawn 18, Total 74 fights.
