= Pierre Bonnet (boxer) =

French boxer

Pierre Bonnet (July 20, 1910 – September 28, 1983) was a French boxer who competed in the 1936 Summer Olympics.

In 1936, he was eliminated in the first round of the bantamweight class after losing his fight to Antoni Czortek.
