= William Marquart =

Canadian boxer

William Marquart (February 24, 1915 – June 13, 1960) was a Canadian boxer who competed in the 1936 Summer Olympics.

He was born in Winnipeg, Manitoba and died in Chicago, Illinois, United States.

In 1936 he was eliminated in the quarterfinals of the featherweight class after losing his fight to Dezső Frigyes.

Embarking on a professional career after the Olympics, he eventually moved to the United States permanently and joined the country's Navy in June 1942, the same month in which he TKOed Cleo McNeal in his final professional fight.

== 1936 Olympic results ==
Below is the record of William Marquart, a Canadian featherweight boxer who competed at the 1936 Berlin Olympics.

- Round of 32: bye
- Round of 16: defeated Josef Jelen (Czechoslovakia) on points
- Quarterfinal: lost to Dezso Frigyes (Hungary) on points
