= Guido Nardecchia =

Italian boxer (1919–2003)

Guido Nardecchia (20 November 1919 – 19 December 2003) was an Italian boxer.

Born in Rome, Nardecchia won the Italian champion title in 1936, participated in the International Meeting at Berlin 1938, and won the bronze medal in the Flyweight class at the 1939 European Amateur Boxing Championships in Dublin. He played for Italy in many matches: ITA vs. USA (1937), ITA vs. POL (1938, 1939), ITA vs. Warsaw (1939), ITA vs. GER (1938, 1939, 1940), and Europe vs. USA (1939, 1940), scoring +10 –2 =2.
