= Czesław Cyraniak =

Polish boxer

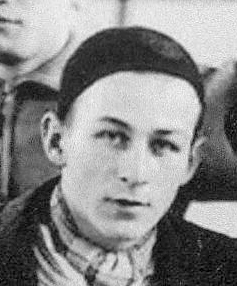
- Cyraniak in 1934

Personal information
- Nationality: Polish
- Born: 1 June 1914; Poznań, Poland
- Died: 11 September 1939 (aged 25); Kutno, Poland

Sport
- Sport: Boxing

Czesław Cyraniak (1 June 1914 – 11 September 1939) was a Polish boxer who competed in the 1936 Summer Olympics. Born in Poznań, in 1936 he was eliminated in the second round of the lightweight class after losing his fight to José Padilla. Cyraniak fought in the Polish Army in the September Campaign and died in the Battle of Bzura.
