= Constantin David (boxer) =

Romanian boxer

Constantin David (born December 25, 1912, date of death unknown) is a Romanian boxer who competed in the 1936 Summer Olympics. In 1936 he was eliminated in the first round of the lightweight class after losing his fight to Mario Facchin.
