= Simon Dewinter =

Belgian boxer

Simon Dewinter (20 September 1908 – 1 August 1972) was a Belgian boxer who competed in the 1936 Summer Olympics.

In 1936 he was eliminated in the second round of the lightweight class after losing his fight to Andrew Scrivani.
