= Shunpei Hashioka =

Japanese boxer

Shunpei Hashioka (Japanese: 橋岡 俊平; born July 7, 1911, in Osaka, Japan – August 7, 1978) was a Japanese-Chinese boxer who competed in the 1936 Summer Olympics. In 1936 he was eliminated in the quarter-finals of the bantamweight class after losing his fight to Stig Cederberg.
