= Evald Seepere =

Estonian boxer (1911–1990)

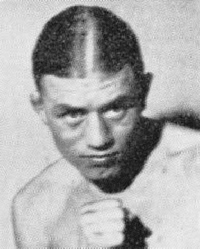

Personal information
- Born: Ewald (Evald) Seeberg; 4 May 1911 Tammiku, Kreis Wierland, Governorate of Estonia, Russian Empire
- Died: 22 February 1990 (aged 78) Tallinn, Estonia

Sport
- Sport: Boxing
- Club: Tallinna Poksiklubi

Evald Seepere (born Seeberg; 4 May 1911 – 22 February 1990) was an Estonian amateur featherweight boxer. He competed in the 1934 European Championships and 1936 Summer Olympics, but was eliminated in a second-round bout. Seepere studied in Moscow in 1942–43, and later for 43 years worked as a boxing coach in Estonia.

== 1936 Olympic results ==
- Round of 32: defeated Nicolae Berechet (Romania) on points
- Round of 16: lost to Theodore Kara (United States) on points
