= 1937 European Amateur Boxing Championships =

Boxing competitions

- Host city: Milan
- Country: Italy
- Nations: 85
- Athletes: 16
- Dates: 5–9 May

The 1937 European Amateur Boxing Championships were held in Milan, Italy from 5 to 9 May. It was the fifth edition of the competition, organised by the European governing body for amateur boxing, EABA. There were 85 fighters from 16 countries participating.

== Medal winners ==
Event	Gold	Silver	Bronze
Flyweight (– 50.8 kilograms)	Vilmos Énekes; Hungary	Edmund Sobkowiak; Poland	Gavino Matta; Italy
Bantamweight (– 53.5 kilograms)	Ulderico Sergo; Italy	Anton Osca; Romania	Veikko Huuskonen; Finland
Featherweight (– 57.1 kilograms)	Aleksander Polus; Poland	Federico Cortonesi; Italy	Gyula Szabó; Hungary
Lightweight (– 61.2 kilograms)	Herbert Nürnberg; Germany	Nikolai Stepulov; Estonia	Marino Facchin; Italy
Welterweight (– 66.7 kilograms)	Michael Murach; Germany	Imre Mándi; Hungary	Oscar Ågren; Sweden
Middleweight (– 72.6 kilograms)	Henryk Chmielewski; Poland	Gerardus Dekkers; Netherlands	Bruno Zorzenone; Italy
Light Heavyweight (– 79.4 kilograms)	Luigi Musina; Italy	Franciszek Szymura; Poland	Lajos Szigeti; Hungary
Heavyweight (+ 79.4 kilograms)	Olle Tandberg; Sweden	Herbert Runge; Germany	Erling Nilsen; Norway

== Medal table ==
Rank	Nation	Gold	Silver	Bronze	Total
1	Poland (POL)	2	2	0	4
2	Italy (ITA)	2	1	3	6
3	Germany (GER)	2	1	0	3
4	Hungary (HUN)	1	1	2	4
5	Sweden (SWE)	1	0	1	2
6	Estonia (EST)	0	1	0	1
6	Netherlands (NED)	0	1	0	1
6	Romania (ROU)	0	1	0	1
9	Finland (FIN)	0	0	1	1
9	Norway (NOR)	0	0	1	1
Totals (10 entries)		8	8	8	24
