= John Treadaway =

British boxer

Jack Treadaway
Personal information
- Nationality: British (English)
- Born: 26 June 1914 Wandsworth, England
- Died: 4 July 1993 (aged 79) Sutton, England

Sport
- Sport: Boxing
- Events: Bantamweight; Featherweight
- Club: Watneys ABC; Battersea & Shexgar ABC

John William Treadaway (26 June 1914 – 4 July 1993) also known as Jack or Jackie, was a British boxer who competed in the 1936 Summer Olympics.

== Biography ==
Treadaway was born in Wandsworth, England, and worked as a van delivery driver for Watney's Brewery. Boxing for Watneys ABC, he won the ABA bantamweight title in 1932.

He moved up to featherweight and boxed out of Battersea & Shexgar Amateur Boxing Club, where he won two ABA titles at featherweight.

He represented England at the 1934 British Empire Games in London, where he competed in the featherweight division.

In 1936 he was eliminated in the quarterfinals of the featherweight class after losing his fight to the eventual bronze medalist Josef Miner.

1936 Olympic results

- Round of 32: defeated Giuseppe Farfanelli (Italy) on points
- Round of 16: defeated Arquimedes Arrieta (Uruguay) on points
- Quarterfinal: lost to Josef Miner (Germany) on points

He died in Sutton.
