= Fidel Ortiz =

Mexican boxer (1908–1975)

Personal information
- Nickname: Fidelón
- Born: Fidel Ortiz Tovar; 10 October 1908 Mexico City, Mexico
- Died: 9 September 1975 (aged 66) Mexico City, Mexico

Boxing career
Medal record
Men's Boxing at the Summer Olympics
Bronze medal – third place	1936 Berlin	Bantamweight

Fidel Ortiz Tovar, also known as Fidelón (10 October 1908 – 9 September 1975) was a Mexican boxer who represented his country in the 1928 and 1936 Summer Olympics. In the later competition, he defeated Swedish pugilist Stig Cederberg to win the bronze medal in the Bantamweight class.

== Amateur career ==
In Amsterdam 1928, he lost his first fight in the bantamweight competition and was eliminated. Eight years later, he won the bronze medal in the bantamweight class after winning the third place fight against Stig Cederberg.

== 1928 Olympic results ==
Below is the record of Fidel Ortiz, a Mexican bantamweight boxer who competed at the 1928 Amsterdam Olympics:

- Round of 32: bye
- Round of 16: lost to Vittorio Tamagnini (Italy) on points

== 1936 Olympic results ==
Below are the results of Fidel Ortiz, a Mexican bantamweight boxer, who competed at the 1936 Berlin Olympics:

- Round of 32: defeated Herve Lacelles (Canada) on points
- Round of 16: defeated Albert Barnes (Great Britain) on points
- Quarterfinal: defeated Alec Hannan (South Africa) on points
- Semifinal: lost to Jack Wilson (United States) on points
- Bronze Medal bout: defeated Stig Cederberg (Sweden) on points (won bronze medal)
