= Oscar Ågren =

Swedish boxer (1914–1992)

Oscar Ågren (1914 – 1992) was a Swedish boxer who competed in the 1937 European Amateur Boxing Championships and in the 1939 European Amateur Boxing Championships.

He twice won the bronze medal at Milan 1937 and Dublin 1939, respectively in the Welterweight and Middleweight classes.
