= Nikolai Stepulov =

Estonian boxer

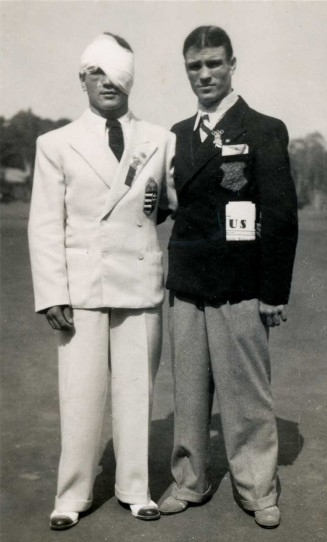
- Imre Harangi and Stepulov (right) at the 1936 Olympics

Personal information
- Born: 20 March 1913 Narva, Saint Petersburg Governorate, Russian Empire
- Died: 2 January 1968 (aged 54) Tallinn, then part of Estonian SSR, Soviet Union

Sport
- Sport: Boxing
- Club: Tallinna Poksiklubi
- Coached by: Nigul Maatsoo
Medal record
Olympic Games
Silver medal – second place	1936 Berlin	lightweight
European Amateur Championships
Silver medal – second place	1937 Milan	lightweight

Nikolai Stepulov (20 March 1913 – 2 January 1968) was an Estonian lightweight boxer, military officer and criminal. As a boxer he won silver medals at the 1936 Olympic Games in Berlin and 1937 European Championships, and fought professionally in 1938–39. During World War II, after the Soviet invasion of Estonia in 1940, Stepulov, an ethnic Russian, became a collaborationist in the so-called people's self-defence (RO). Later after returning to Soviet-controlled Estonia he was arrested a few times for burglary and died in a Soviet prison hospital.

== Boxing career ==
Stepulov took up boxing in 1927 and in 1933–37 won six consecutive Estonian titles. At the 1936 Olympics he won his first four bouts and dominated the first round of the final against Imre Harangi of Hungary. Yet Harangi performed better in the last two rounds, despite having both eyebrows swollen and cut open, and won by a close decision. Next year Stepulov narrowly lost the European final against Herbert Nürnberg. In 1938 he turned professional and fought in Finland, Sweden, Denmark and Germany with a record of 5 wins (4 by knockout), 5 losses and 1 draw. His career was cut short by World War II. He attempted to return to boxing in 1945, but retired after placing second at the Estonian championships.

== World War II and after ==
During his boxing career Stepulov served in the Estonian Army as a private, and was promoted to corporal for his Olympic success. In 1937 he worked as a messenger at the Ministry of Economic Affairs. In 1940, when Soviet troops entered Estonia, he became a Soviet collaborationist and participated in disarming the Signal Battalion. After World war II he returned to Estonia and took odd jobs as a factory worker, turf cutter, lumberjack and boxing coach and referee. He eventually became a heavy drinker and got involved with criminals. In 1955, he was arrested for burglary and sentenced to seven years. He was released after four years, but was later arrested a few more times for similar offenses. In the 1960s he developed the Parkinson's disease and died in the hospital of the Tallinn central prison.
