= Karl Schmedes =

German boxer

Karl Schmedes (November 14, 1908 – May 31, 1981) was a German boxer who competed in the 1936 Summer Olympics.

He was born in Dortmund.

In 1936 he was eliminated in the first round of the lightweight class after losing his fight to José Padilla.

== 1936 Olympic results ==
Below is the record of Karl Schmedes, a German lightweight boxer who competed at the 1936 Berlin Olympics:

- Round of 32: lost to José Padilla (Philippines) by decision
