= Imre Harangi =

Hungarian boxer (1913–1979)

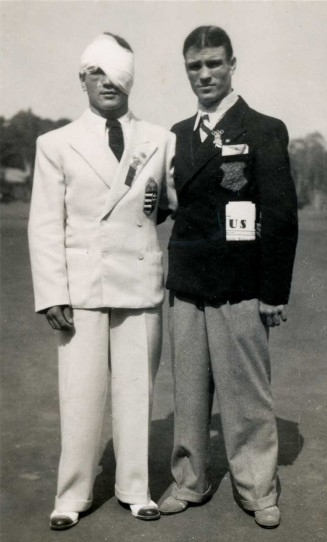
- Harangi (left) and Stepulov at the 1936 Olympics

Personal information
- Born: 16 October 1913 Nyíradony, Hungary
- Died: 4 February 1979 (aged 65) Budapest, Hungary

Sport
- Sport: Boxing
- Club: Mávag Gépgyári Sportegyesület
Medal record
Representing Hungary
Olympic Games
| Gold medal – first place | 1936 Berlin | Lightweight |
European Amateur Championships
| Silver medal – second place | 1934 Milan | Lightweight |

Imre Harangi (16 October 1913 – 4 February 1979) was a Hungarian amateur lightweight boxer. He placed second at the 1934 European Championships and won a gold medal at the 1936 Summer Olympics in a close final against Nikolai Stepulov of Estonia. Harangi lost the first round and had his both eyes swollen and bleeding, yet he managed to outperform Stepulov in the remaining two rounds.

== 1936 Olympic results ==
Below are the results of Imre Harangi, a Hungarian boxer who competed in the lightweight division of the 1936 Berlin Olympics:

- Round of 32: bye
- Round of 16: defeated Robert Seidel (Switzerland) on points
- Quarterfinal: defeated Jose Padilla Jr. (Philippines) on points
- Semifinal: defeated Poul Kopa (Denmark) on points
- Final: defeated Nikolai Stepulov (Estonia) on points (won gold medal)
