= Josef Miner =

German boxer (1914–1944

Olympic medal record

Men's Boxing
Bronze medal – third place	1936 Berlin	featherweight

Josef Miner (15 July 1914 in Breslau, German Empire – 1944 in Huși, Romania) was a German boxer who competed in the 1936 Summer Olympics. In 1936 he won the bronze medal in the featherweight class after winning the third-place bout versus Hungary's Dezső Frigyes.

He was killed in action during World War II.

== 1936 Olympic results ==
Below are the results of Josef Miner, a featherweight boxer, who competed for Germany at the 1936 Berlin Olympics:

- Round of 32: defeated Khalil Amira El-Maghrabi (Egypt) on points
- Round of 16: defeated Remi Lescrauwaet (Belgium) on points
- Quarterfinal: defeated John Treadaway (Great Britain) on points
- Semifinal: lost to Charles Catterall (South Africa) on points
- Bronze Medal Bout: defeated Dezso Frigyes (Hungary) on points (was awarded the bronze medal)
