= Jack Wilson (boxer) =

American boxer

Medal record

Men's boxing

Representing the United States

Olympic Games
| Silver medal – second place | 1936 Berlin | Bantamweight |

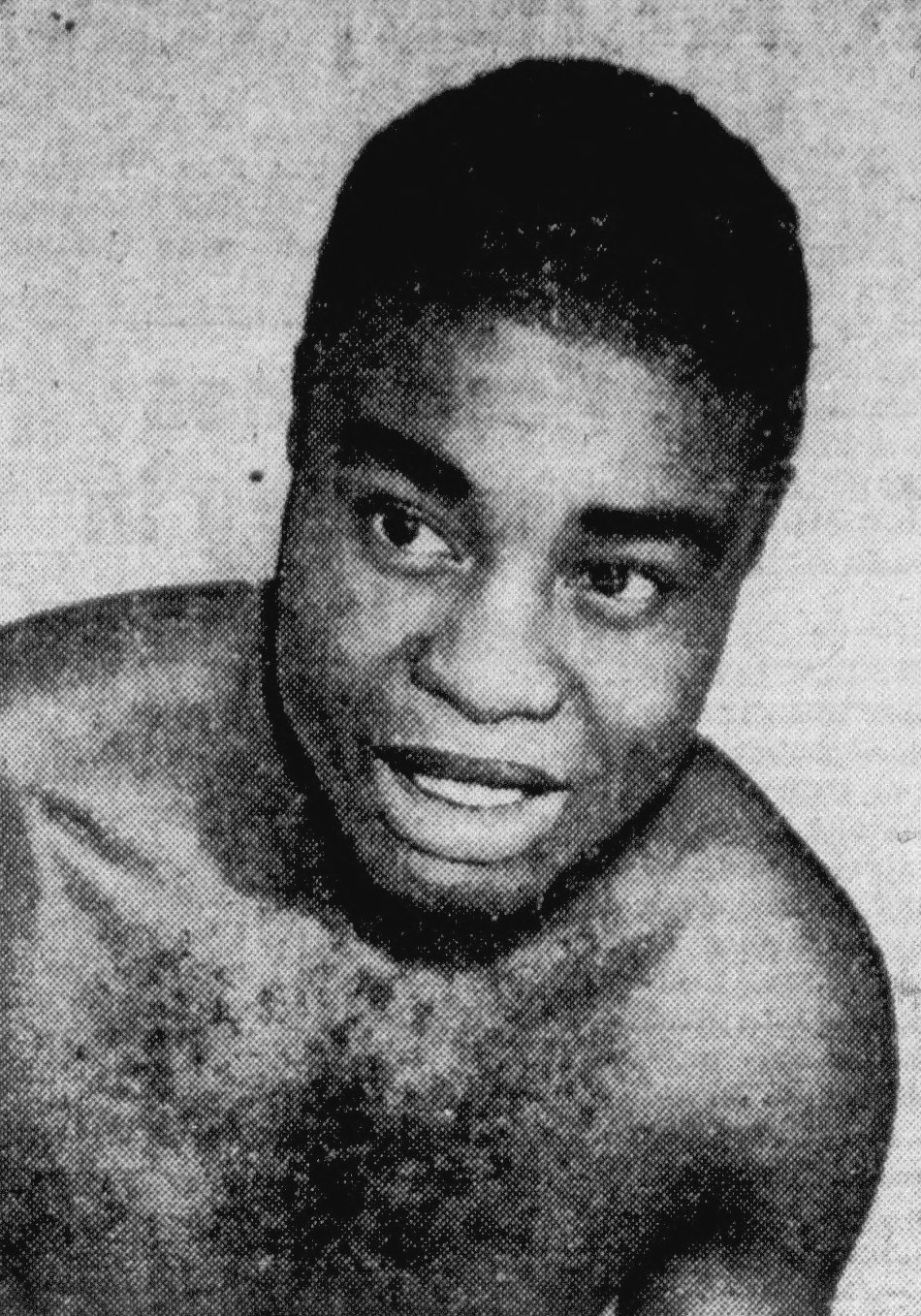
Wilson, circa 1946

California Jack Wilson (January 17, 1918 – March 10, 1956), born George Dudley Wilson, won a silver medal in boxing for the United States during the 1936 Summer Olympics in Berlin, Germany. He was born in Spencer, North Carolina.

Wilson was the silver medalist in the bantamweight class at the 1936 Berlin Olympiad. Wilson was defeated in the final by Ulderico Sergo of Italy. He was the 1936 112 lb Golden Gloves Champion for both Chicago and in Intercity competition.

Wilson went on to have a successful pro career, and was ranked number two in the world at lightweight by Ring Magazine in 1940, and number two in 1941 at welterweight. Wilson was also the first African-American boxer to fight a main event at Hollywood Legion Stadium, when he defeated Tony Chavez on April 26, 1940.

In 2016, the 1936 Olympic journey of the eighteen Black American athletes, including Wilson, was documented in the film Olympic Pride, American Prejudice.

== Olympic record ==
Jack Wilson competed for the United States at the 1936 Berlin Olympics as a bantamweight boxer. Here is his record from that event:

- Round of 32: defeated Leonardo Gula (Argentina) on points
- Round of 16: defeated Alfredo Petrone (Uruguay)
- Quarterfinal: defeated Oscar de Larrazabal (Philippines) on points
- Semifinal: defeated Fidel Ortiz (Mexico) on points
- Final: lost to Ulderico Sergo (Italy) on points (was awarded silver medal)
