= Gösta Ågren =

Finnish author (1936–2020)

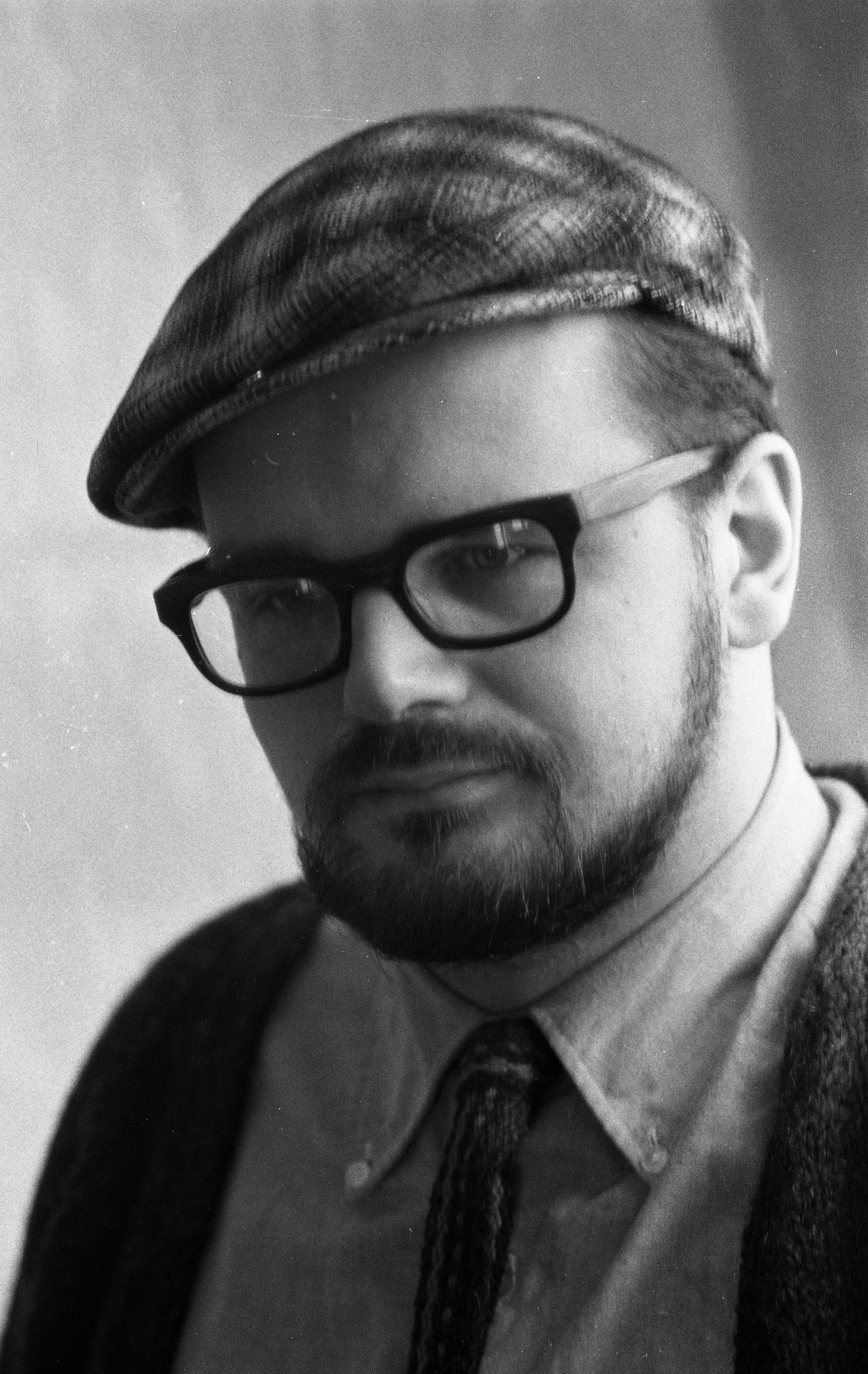
Gösta Ågren in 1968.

Sven Gösta Ågren (3 August 1936 in Nykarleby – 24 June 2020) was a Finland-Swedish author who won the Finlandia Prize in 1988 for Jär.

His parents were the farmer and worker Rudolf Filemon Ågren and Olga Elisabet Rosenblad. After various jobs, including as a metalworker in Jakobstad (1953–54) and a library clerk at the University of Helsinki library (1959–60), Ågren studied directing at the Stockholm Film School from 1964 to 1966 and taught at Kalix Folk High School in Sweden in 1967.

He earned a doctorate in literature from Stockholm University in 1971. His doctoral dissertation was on the poet Dan Andersson, titled Kärlek som i allting bor. Dan Anderssons liv och diktning 1916—1920 ('Love that Lives in Everything. Dan Andersson's Life and Poetry 1916-1920'). Gösta Ågren, who wrote his works in Swedish, praised the Gospel of Mark for its literary values and published the collection Timmermannen ('The Carpenter') in reference to it. He was known for his left-wing sympathies, which can be seen in his autobiographical work concerning the rural "proletariat." In addition to a prize from the Swedish Literature Society in Finland in 1971, he was active in writers' organizations, serving on the board of the Society of Swedish Authors in Finland for twenty years and as secretary of the Ostrobothnian Authors' Association starting in 1975. His brothers Leo and Erik were also writers.

He published poems, essays and biographies. Among his other work, he wrote and directed for television, with works including the TV drama Hushåll (1966), and translated other writers, such as Pentti Saarikoski, whose Brev till min hustru ('Letters to My Wife') he translated in 1969. Among the literary prizes awarded to him was the Finlandia Prize for Fiction for the poetry collection Jär ('Here') in 1989. In his poems, Ågren often referred to the region he was born in, Ostrobothnia, on the west coast of Finland; his 1975 book Hammarbandet, for example, was about Ostrobothnian peasant boats. (Books from Finland once had t-shirts printed with a philosophical line from one of his poems: “Don’t worry, it will / never work out.” The shirts were highly popular.)

== Selected bibliography ==
- Kraft och tanke ('Power and Thought', 1955)
- Jordlös bonde ('Landless Peasant', 1956)
- Folkvargarna ('The People's Wolves', 1958)
- Din makt är alltför stor ('Your Power is Too Great', 1962)
- Säg farväl åt natten ('Say Goodbye to the Night', 1963)
- "Ågren" (1968)
- Kärlek som i allting bor. Dan Anderssons liv och diktning 1916—1920 ('Love that Lives in Everything. Dan Andersson's Life and Poetry 1916-1920', 1971), doctoral thesis
- Hammarbandet. En bok om Österbottens allmogebåtar ('A book about Ostrobothnian peasant boats', 1975)
- Vår historia ('Our History', 1977)
- Paus. Valda dikter 1955—1980 ('Pause. Selected poems 1955-1980', 1979)
- Det som alltid är ('That Which Always Is', 1982)
- En man gick genom stormen. Leo Ågrens liv och diktning ('A Man Walked Through the Storm. Leo Ågren's Life and Poetry', 1983)
- Ågren, Gösta (1992). A Valley in the Midst of Violence: Selected Poems [En dal i våldet]. Translated by David McDuff. Newcastle upon Tyne: Bloodaxe Books. ISBN 1-85224-236-1.
