= Charles Catterall =

South African boxer

Personal information
- Born: 16 October 1914
Medal record
Men's Boxing
Representing South Africa
Olympic Games
Silver medal – second place	1936 Berlin	Featherweight
British Empire Games
Gold medal – first place	1934 London	Featherweight

Charles Catterall (16 October 1914 – 1 November 1966) was a South African boxer who competed in the 1936 Summer Olympics.

In 1936, he won the silver medal in the featherweight class after losing the final against Oscar Casanovas of Argentina.

At the 1934 British Empire Games, he won the gold medal in the featherweight class after winning the final against J.D. Jones of Wales.

== 1936 Olympic results ==
Below is the record of Charles Catterall, a South African featherweight boxer who competed at the 1936 Berlin Olympics:

- Round of 32: defeated Hans Wiltschek (Austria) on points
- Round of 16: defeated Jan Nicolaas (Netherlands) on points
- Quarterfinal: defeated Theodore Kara (United States) on points
- Semifinal: defeated Josef Miner (Germany) on points
- Final: lost to Oscar Casanovas (Argentina) on points (was awarded silver medal)
