= Stig Cederberg =

Swedish boxer

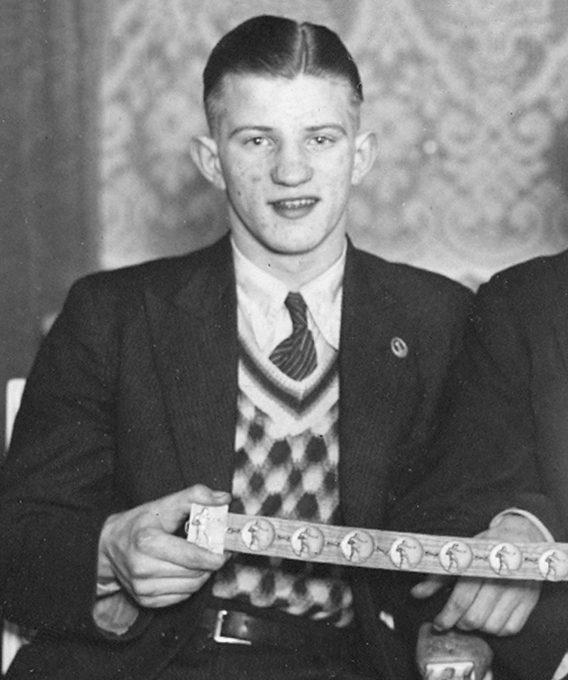

Personal information
- Born: 11 December 1913 Stockholm, Sweden
- Died: 25 September 1980 (aged 66) Sundbyberg, Stockholm, Sweden

Sport
- Sport: Boxing
- Club: BK Primo, Stockholm
Medal record
Representing Sweden
European Championships
Silver medal – second place	1934 Budapest	Bantamweight

Stig Cederberg (11 December 1913 – 25 September 1980) was a Swedish bantamweight boxer who won a silver medal at the 1934 European Championships and finished fourth at the 1936 Summer Olympics.
