= Ulderico Sergo =

Italian boxer (1913–1967)

Personal information
- Nationality: Italian
- Born: 4 July 1913 Fiume, Transleithania, Austria-Hungary (nowadays Rijeka, Croatia)
- Died: 20 February 1967 (aged 53) Cleveland, United States
- Weight: Flyweight and Bantamweight

Boxing career

Boxing record
- Total fights: 15
- Wins: 4
- Win by KO: 0
- Losses: 7
- Draws: 4
Medal record
Representing Italy
Men's Boxing
Olympic Games
Gold medal – first place	1936 Berlin	Bantamweight
European Amateur Championship
Gold medal – first place	1937 Milan	Bantamweight
Gold medal – first place	1939 Dublin	Bantamweight

Ulderico Sergo (Fiume, 4 July 1913 – Cleveland, 20 February 1967) was a bantamweight professional boxer from Italy, who won the gold medal at the 1936 Summer Olympics in Berlin. He defeated Jackie Wilson of the United States by decision in the final. He was part of the Italian team which won the international boxing event at Yankee Stadium on 9 June 1937.

== Olympic results ==
Below are the results of Ulderico Sergo, an Italian bantamweight boxer, who competed at the 1936 Berlin Olympics:

- Round of 32: bye
- Round of 16: defeated Frigyes Kubinyi (Hungary) on points
- Quarterfinal: defeated Joseph Cornelis (Belgium) on points
- Semifinal: defeated Stig Cederberg (Sweden) on points
- Final: defeated Jackie Wilson (United States) on points (won gold medal)
