= Erik Ågren (boxer) =

Swedish boxer (1916–1985)

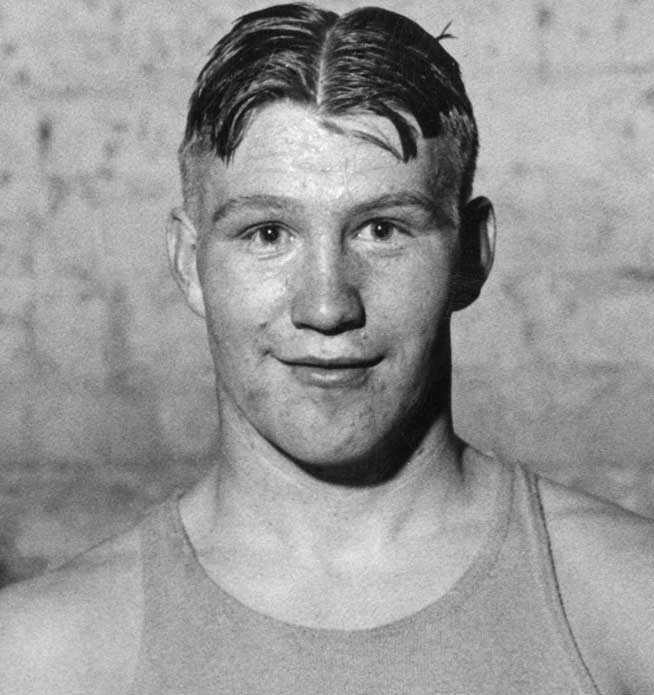

Personal information
- Born: 3 January 1916 Ytterselö, Sweden
- Died: 3 July 1985 (aged 69) Hägersten, Stockholm, Sweden

Sport
- Sport: Boxing
- Club: Narva BK
Medal record
Sweden
Olympic Games
Bronze medal – third place	1936 Berlin	Lightweight
European Amateur Championships
Silver medal – second place	1939 Dublin	Welterweight

Erik Alfred Ågren (3 January 1916 – 3 July 1985) was a Swedish amateur boxer. He won a bronze medal in the lightweight division at the 1936 Summer Olympics and a silver medal as a welterweight at the 1939 European Amateur Boxing Championships.

Ågren's three brothers, Carl, Oscar and Ture Ågren, were also elite boxers who competed at the European level.
