= Republic of China at the 1936 Summer Olympics =

- Flag of the Republic of China
- IOC code: ROC (CHN used at these Games)
- NOC: Chinese Olympic Committee (Note: See Chinese Olympic Committee#Timeline concerning Olympic recognition and Chinese Taipei Olympic Committee#History.)

in Berlin
- Competitors: 54 (52 men, 2 women) in 7 sports
- Flag bearer: Lee Wai Tong
- Medals: Gold 0 Silver 0 Bronze 0 Total 0

Summer Olympics appearances (overview)
- 1924; 1928; 1932; 1936; 1948

Other related appearances
- China (1952–pres.); Chinese Taipei (1956–pres.)

China, as the Republic of China, competed at the 1936 Summer Olympics in Berlin, Germany. 54 competitors, 52 men and 2 women, took part in 27 events in 7 sports. The team is the inspiration for the 2008 film, Champions.

== Athletics ==
Track&Road events

Athlete	Event	Heat		Quarterfinal		Semifinal		Final	
Athlete	Event	Result	Rank	Result	Rank	Result	Rank	Result	Rank
Poh Kimseng	Men's 100 m		5	Did Not Advance					
Chen Kingkwan	Men's 100 m		4	Did Not Advance					
Liu Changchun	Men's 100 m		5	Did Not Advance					
Chen Kingkwan	Men's 200 m		5	Did Not Advance					
Poh Kimseng	Men's 200 m		4	Did Not Advance					
Liu Changchun	Men's 200 m		5	Did Not Advance					
Leonard Tay	Men's 400 m	52.4	6	Did Not Advance					
Jia Lianren	Men's 1500 m		10	—N/a				did not advance	
Wang Zhenglin	Men's Marathon	—N/a						3:25:36.4	40
Cai Tsungyi	Men's 50 kilometres walk	—N/a						5:16:02.4	22
Zhou Yuyu	Men's 50 kilometres walk	—N/a						5:25:01.0	24
Chang Chanchiu	Men's 50 kilometres walk	—N/a						5:26:54.2	25
Huang Yingjie	Men's 110m Hurdles	16.9	5	—N/a		Did Not Advance			
Lin Shaozhou	Men's 110m Hurdles	15.7	5	—N/a		Did Not Advance			
Li Sen	Women's 100m		5	—N/a		Did Not Advance			

Field events

Athlete	Event	Qualification		Final	
Athlete	Event	Distance	Position	Distance	Position
Chang Chia-gwe	Men's Long jump			Did Not Advance	
Hoh Chunde	Men's Long jump			Did Not Advance	
Situ Guong	Men's Long jump			Did Not Advance	
Chang Chia-gwe	Men's Triple jump			Did Not Advance	
Situ Guong	Men's Triple jump			Did Not Advance	
Wang Shilin	Men's Triple jump			Did Not Advance	
Wu Bixian	Men's High jump	1.70	=32	Did Not Advance	
Fu Baolu	Men's Pole vault	3.80 Q	=1	3.80	=17
Chen Baoqiu	Men's Shot Put			Did Not Advance	
Guo Jie	Men's Discus Throw	41.13		Did Not Advance	
Ling Peigeng	Men's Discus Throw			Did Not Advance	
Hoh Chunde	Men's Javelin throw	48.0	=26	Did Not Advance	

Relay events

Athlete	Event	Heat		Final	
Athlete	Event	Result	Rank	Result	Rank
Poh Kimseng	Men's 4 × 100 metres relay	44.8	6	Did Not Advance	
Huang Yingjie	Men's 4 × 100 metres relay	44.8	6	Did Not Advance	
Chen Kingkwan	Men's 4 × 100 metres relay	44.8	6	Did Not Advance	
Liu Changchun	Men's 4 × 100 metres relay	44.8	6	Did Not Advance	

Combined events – Decathlon

Athlete	Event	100 m	LJ	SP	HJ	400 m	110H	DT	PV	JT	1500 m	Final	Rank
Chang Singchow	Result	12.2	6.28	DNS								DNF	-
Chang Singchow	Points	556	622	DNS								DNF	-

== Basketball ==
Rosters

Coach:Dong Shouyi

Athlete	Age
Feng Niehhwa	22
Hsu Chaohsung	24
Li Shaotang	22
Liu Baocheng	19
Liu Yunchang	24
Mou Tsyun	21
Shen Yikung	18
Tsai Yenhung	20
Wang Hungpin	21
Wang Shihsuan	21
Wang Yutseng	24
Wong Nanchen	20
Yu Chinghsiao	24

=== First round ===
Republic of China 19-35 Japan

=== First Round Repechage ===
Republic of China 45-38 France

=== Second round ===
Republic of China 21-29 Peru

=== Second Round Repechage ===
Republic of China 14-32 Brazil

== Boxing ==
Athlete	Event	Round of 32	Round of 16	Quarterfinals	Semifinals	Final	
Athlete	Event	Opposition Result	Opposition Result	Opposition Result	Opposition Result	Opposition Result	Rank
Chin Kuaiti	Middleweight	Richard Shrimpton (GBR); L K.O.	Did Not Advance				
Wang Yunlan	Light heavyweight	Wim Fock (NED); L PTS	Did Not Advance				

== Cycling ==
One male cyclist represented China in 1936.

Athlete	Event	Round 1	Round 1 Repechage	Round 2	Quarter Finals	Semi Finals	Finals	Final
Athlete	Event	Opposition Result	Opposition Result	Opposition Result	Opposition Result	Opposition Result	Opposition Result	Rank
Howard Wing	Men's sprint	Benedetto Pola (ITA); L	Doug Peace (CAN); L	did not advance				

== Football ==
=== First round ===
August 6, 1936
17:30

Great Britain	2–0	China
Dodds 55'; Finch 65'	Report

Mommsenstadion, Berlin
Attendance: 8,000
Referee: Helmut Fink (GER)

== Swimming ==
Men

Athlete	Event	Heat		Semifinal		Final	
Athlete	Event	Result	Rank	Result	Rank	Result	Rank
Charlie Chan	100m freestyle	1:06.5	8	Did Not Advance			

Women

Athlete	Event	Heat		Semifinal		Final	
Athlete	Event	Result	Rank	Result	Rank	Result	Rank
Yeung Sauking	100m freestyle	1:22.2	7	Did Not Advance			
Yeung Sauking	100m backstroke	1:36.4	6	Did Not Advance			

== Weightlifting ==
Athlete	Event	Military Press		Snatch		Clean & Jerk		Total	Rank
Athlete	Event	Result	Rank	Result	Rank	Result	Rank	Total	Rank
Wong Seahkee	Featherweight(60kg)	70.0	=18	80.0	=15	105.0	=14	255.0	16
Seng Liang	Featherweight(60kg)	72.5	=15	75.0	20	95.0	20	242.5	20
Own Kongding	LightWeight(67.5kg)	77.5	15	75.0	16	DNS		152.5	16

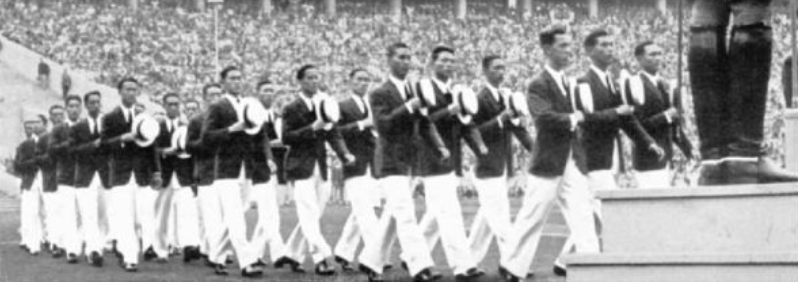
the team in the opening ceremony
