= Athletics at the 1936 Summer Olympics – Men's long jump =

Men's long jump at the Games of the XI Olympiad
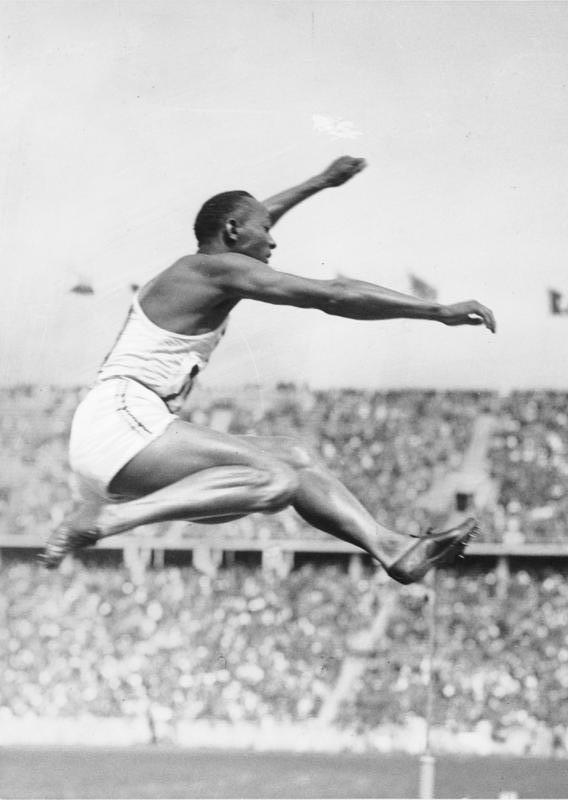
- Jesse Owens
- Venue: Olympiastadion: Berlin, Germany
- Date: August 4, 1936
- Competitors: 43 from 27 nations
- Winning distance: 8.06 OR

Medalists
1st place, gold medalist(s)		Jesse Owens; United States
2nd place, silver medalist(s)		Luz Long; Germany
3rd place, bronze medalist(s)		Naoto Tajima; Japan

The men's long jump event was part of the track and field athletics programme at the 1936 Summer Olympics. The competition was held on August 4, 1936. Forty-three athletes from 27 nations competed. The maximum number of athletes per nation had been set at 3 since the 1930 Olympic Congress. The final was won by 19 cm by American Jesse Owens. It was the United States' fourth consecutive and ninth overall gold medal in the event; it was also Owens's second of four gold medals in the 1936 Games. Luz Long won Germany's first medal in the event with silver; Naoto Tajima put Japan on the podium for the second Games in a row with bronze.

== Jesse Owens and Luz Long ==
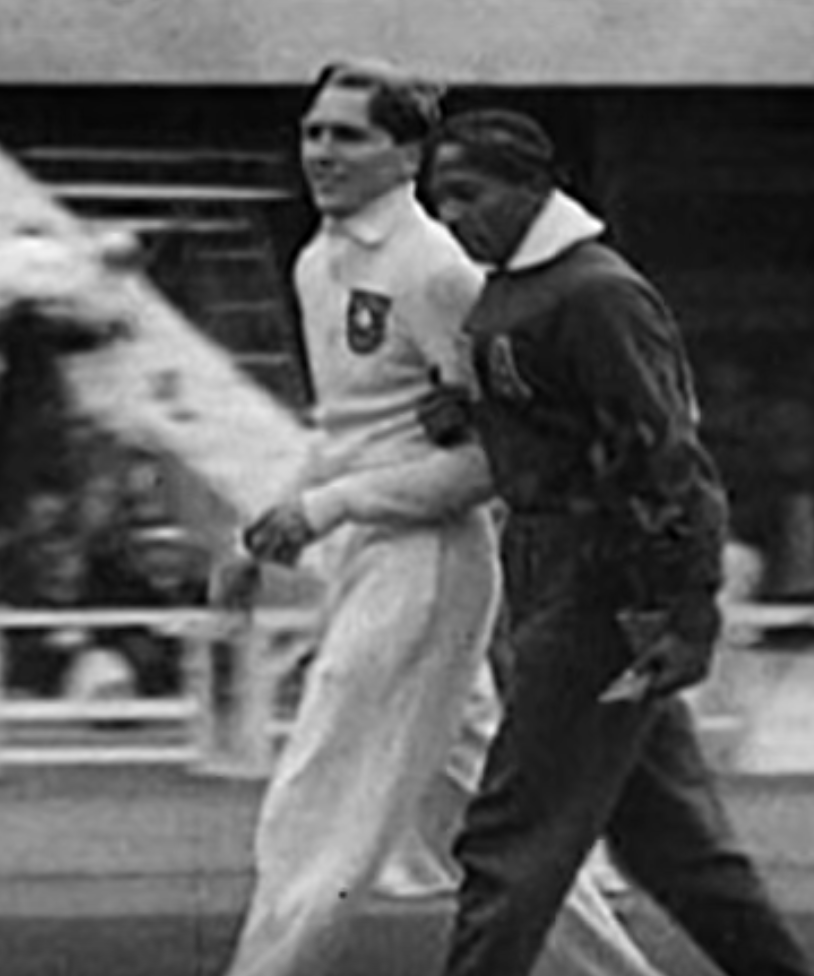
Jesse Owens and Luz Long walk arm-in-arm after their competition

The competition between Owens and Long resulted in a story of friendship, possibly embellished into mythology. Both men were accomplished long jumpers going into the Games, with Owens holding the world record and Long holding the European record. Owens, however, fouled in his first two jumps in the qualifying round; he needed a successful jump, of at least 7.15 metres, to advance to the semifinal round.

In the 1964 documentary Jesse Owens Returns to Berlin, Owens relates a story that Long came over to offer advice before Owens's third jump. According to the story, Long said that Owens should jump from a few inches before the takeoff board. This would reduce the measured distance but avoid the risk of another fault; the theory was that Owens would still clear the required distance even with the handicap of jumping early. However, this conversation may be apocryphal; Grantland Rice was watching Owens the entirety of the qualifying round and did not see him speak to Long. Author Tom Ecker relates that he asked Owens about the story in 1965 and Owens admitted that it was not true, but just a good story.

In any case, Owens successfully made his third jump at 7.64 metres, advancing to the semifinal round. He and Long each beat the old Olympic record of 7.765 metres multiple times in the semifinal and final rounds. Owens finished with a best jump of 8.06 metres to Long's 7.87 metres. Then, if not before, the two met and became friends: Long was the first to congratulate Owens, embracing the African-American in front of Adolf Hitler. Owens was later the best man at the wedding of Long's son.

== Background ==
This was the 10th appearance of the event, which is one of 12 athletics events to have been held at every Summer Olympics. The only returning jumper from the 1932 Games was sixth-place finisher Naoto Tajima of Japan. Jesse Owens was the world record holder and heavy favorite.

Afghanistan, the Republic of China, Peru, the Philippines, Romania, and Yugoslavia each made their first appearance in the event. The United States appeared for the 10th time, the only nation to have long jumpers at each of the Games thus far.

== Competition format ==
The 1936 competition used a three-round format, quite different from previous iterations. For the qualifying round, each jumper had three attempts to reach the required distance of 7.15 metres. Every jumper who achieved that result in qualifying advanced to the semifinal round. There, each jumper had three jumps. The six men with the best jumps in the semifinal advanced to the final, where they received an additional three jumps; any of the six jumps from the semifinal or final would count for the final score, but not the qualifying round jumps.

== Records ==
These were the standing world and Olympic records (in metres) prior to the 1928 Summer Olympics.

World record	Jesse Owens (USA)	8.13	Ann Arbor, United States	25 May 1935
Olympic record	Robert LeGendre (USA)	7.765(*)	Paris, France	7 July 1924

(*) Robert LeGendre set the Olympic record in the 1924 pentathlon contest

Jesse Owens broke the Olympic record with his second jump in the final round, at 7.87 metres. Luz Long matched that with his fifth, penultimate jump (after also breaking the older record at 7.84 metres on his third), but Owens finished with 7.94 metres and 8.06 metres in his fifth and sixth jumps. However, all of these jumps were wind-aided.

== Schedule ==
Date	Time	Round
Tuesday, 4 August 1936	10:30; 16:30; 17:45	Qualifying; Semifinal; Final

== Results ==
=== Qualifying ===
Athlete	Nation	Distance	Notes
Jesse Owens	United States	7.64	Q
Luz Long	Germany	>=7.15	Q
Naoto Tajima	Japan	>=7.15	Q
Wilhelm Leichum	Germany	>=7.15	Q
Arturo Maffei	Italy	>=7.15	Q
Bob Clark	United States	>=7.15	Q
John Brooks	United States	>=7.15	Q
Robert Paul	France	>=7.15	Q
Artur Bäumle	Germany	>=7.15	Q
Åke Stenqvist	Sweden	>=7.15	Q
Otto Berg	Norway	>=7.15	Q
Gianni Caldana	Italy	7.26	Q
Josef Vosolsobě	Czechoslovakia	>=7.15	Q
Sam Richardson	Canada	>=7.15	Q
Márcio de Oliveira	Brazil	>=7.15	Q
Kenshi Togami	Japan	>=7.15	Q
Claude Heim	France	7.10	
André Prébolin	France	7.07	
Willy Rasmussen	Denmark	6.92	
Bondoc Ionescu-Crum	Romania	<7.15	
Carlos de la Guerra	Peru	<7.15	
Edward Boyce	Great Britain	<7.15	
Émile Binet	Belgium	<7.15	
François Mersch	Luxembourg	<7.15	
George Traynor	Great Britain	<7.15	
Grigorios Lambrakis	Greece	<7.15	
Chang Chia-gwe	Republic of China	<7.15	
Henrik Koltai	Hungary	<7.15	
Ivo Buratović	Yugoslavia	<7.15	
Jiří Hoffmann	Czechoslovakia	<7.15	
Max Berendson	Peru	<7.15	
Marten Klasema	Netherlands	<7.15	
Martti Tolamo	Finland	<7.15	
Masao Harada	Japan	<7.15	
Mohammad Khan	Afghanistan	<7.15	
Niño Ramírez	Philippines	<7.15	
Onni Rajasaari	Finland	<7.15	
Pascual Gutiérrez	Mexico	<7.15	
Rudolf Polame	Czechoslovakia	<7.15	
Ruudi Toomsalu	Estonia	7.00	
Hoh Chunde	Republic of China	<7.15	
Situ Guong	Republic of China	<7.15	
Jean Studer	Switzerland	No mark	
Ingvard Andersen	Denmark	DNS	
Walter Mäder	Switzerland	DNS	
Ignacio Sánchez	Spain	DNS	
Pedro del Vecchio	Colombia	DNS	

=== Semifinal and Final ===
Rank	Athlete	Nation	Semifinal				Final			
Rank	Athlete	Nation	1	2	3	Result	4	5	6	Result
1st place, gold medalist(s)	Jesse Owens	United States	7.74	7.87 OR	7.75	7.87	X	7.94 OR	8.06 OR	8.06
2nd place, silver medalist(s)	Luz Long	Germany	7.54	7.74	7.84	7.84	7.73	7.87 =OR	X	7.87
3rd place, bronze medalist(s)	Naoto Tajima	Japan	7.65	X	7.74	7.74	7.52	7.60	X	7.74
4	Wilhelm Leichum	Germany	X	X	7.52	7.52	7.38	7.25	7.73	7.73
4	Arturo Maffei	Italy	7.50	7.47	7.73	7.73	7.22	7.42	7.39	7.73
6	Bob Clark	United States	X	7.60	7.54	7.60	7.60	7.67	7.57	7.67
7	John Brooks	United States	7.34	7.41	7.19	7.41	Did not advance			
8	Robert Paul	France	7.34	6.93	7.08	7.34	Did not advance			
9	Arthur Bäumle	Germany	7.32	7.21	7.13	7.32	Did not advance			
10	Åke Stenqvist	Sweden	7.30	7.13	6.68	7.30	Did not advance			
10	Otto Berg	Norway	7.30	X	6.95	7.30	Did not advance			
12	Gianni Caldana	Italy	7.26	7.16	7.26	7.26	Did not advance			
13	Josef Vosolsobě	Czechoslovakia	X	7.03	7.18	7.18	Did not advance			
14	Sam Richardson	Canada	7.13	X	X	7.13	Did not advance			
15	Márcio de Oliveira	Brazil	X	6.81	7.05	7.05	Did not advance			
16	Kenshi Togami	Japan	6.18	X	X	6.18	Did not advance			
