= Athletics at the 1936 Summer Olympics – Men's triple jump =

Men's triple jump at the Games of the XI Olympiad
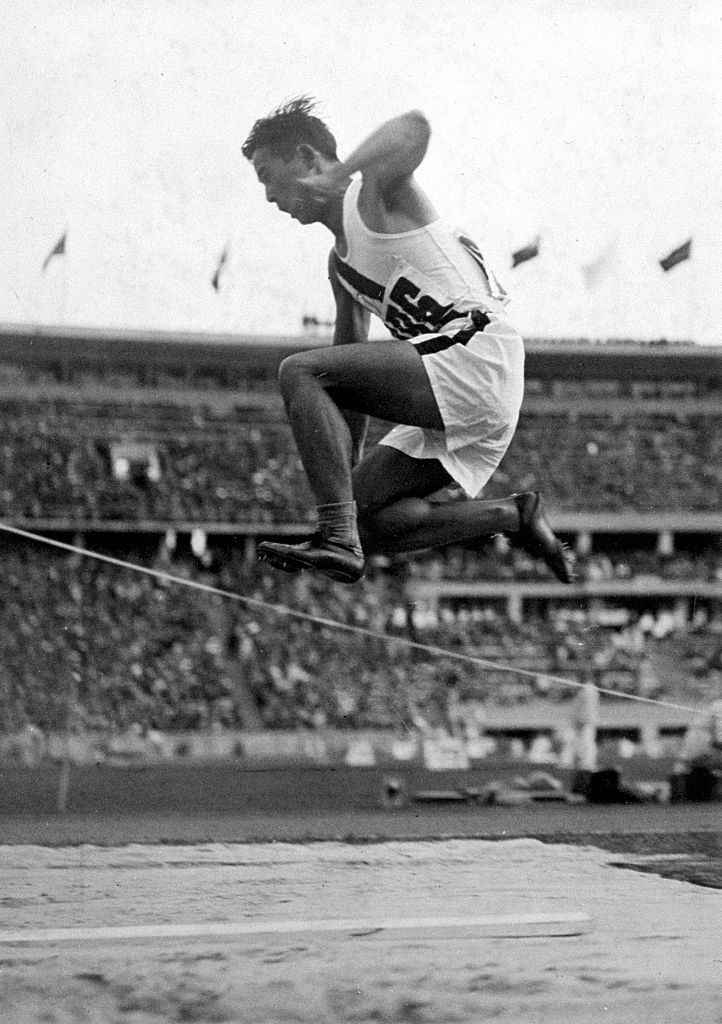
- Naoto Tajima
- Venue: Olympiastadion: Berlin, Germany
- Date: August 6, 1936
- Competitors: 31 from 19 nations
- Winning time: 16.00 WR

Medalists
1st place, gold medalist(s)		Naoto Tajima; Japan
2nd place, silver medalist(s)		Masao Harada; Japan
3rd place, bronze medalist(s)		Jack Metcalfe; Australia

The men's triple jump event was part of the track and field athletics programme at the 1936 Summer Olympics. The competition was held on August 6, 1936. Thirty-one athletes from 19 nations competed. The maximum number of athletes per nation had been set at 3 since the 1930 Olympic Congress. The final was won by Naoto Tajima of Japan with a world-record jump. It was Japan's third consecutive gold medal in the men's triple jump; as of the 2016 Games, it is the last gold medal Japan has won in the event. Masao Harada's silver medal made it the second Games in which Japan put two men on the podium in the event. Jack Metcalfe of Australia (whose record Tajima broke) earned bronze, Australia's first medal in the event since 1924.

== Background ==
This was the 10th appearance of the event, which is one of 12 athletics events to have been held at every Summer Olympics. Returning jumpers from the 1932 Games were bronze medalist Kenkichi Oshima of Japan, eighth-place finisher Rolland Romero of the United States, and eleventh-place finisher Onni Rajasaari of Finland. World record holder Jack Metcalfe of Australia competed, threatening the Japanese dominance of the event. Oshima had won the triple jump at the 1934 Far East Championship, with Masao Harada second. Naoto Tajima had won the long jump then, and also came into this event as the 1936 Olympic bronze medalist in the long jump.

Chile, the Republic of China, Colombia, Iceland, Poland, and Yugoslavia each made their first appearance in the event. The United States competed for the 10th time, having competed at each of the Games so far.

== Competition format ==
The competition introduced what would eventually become the standard two-round format, though at the time it was described as a three-round format. In the qualifying round (or "elimination trials"), each jumper received three attempts to reach the qualifying distance of 14.00 metres. Those who did advanced to the final round. In the final round, each jumper took three jumps (the "semifinal"). The top six after that received a further three jumps (the "final"), with the best of the six to count.

== Records ==
These were the standing world and Olympic records (in metres) prior to the 1928 Summer Olympics.

World record	Jack Metcalfe (AUS)	15.78	Sydney, Australia	14 December 1935
Olympic record	Chūhei Nambu (JPN)	15.72	Los Angeles, United States	4 August 1932

Naoto Tajima set the new world and Olympic records with 16.00 metres in his fourth jump of the final.

== Schedule ==
Date	Time	Round
Thursday, 6 August 1936	14:00; 16:30	Qualifying; Final

== Results ==
=== Qualifying ===
The distances jumped in the qualifying round are not known. Those who advanced jumped further than 14.00 metres; those who did not advance jumped shorter than that.

Athlete	Nation	Distance	Notes
Naoto Tajima	Japan	Unknown	Q
Masao Harada	Japan	Unknown	Q
Jack Metcalfe	Australia	Unknown	Q
Heinz Wöllner	Germany	Unknown	Q
Rolland Romero	United States	Unknown	Q
Kenkichi Oshima	Japan	Unknown	Q
Erich Joch	Germany	Unknown	Q
Dudley Wilkins	United States	Unknown	Q
Olavi Suomela	Finland	Unknown	Q
Luz Long	Germany	Unknown	Q
Edward Luckhaus	Poland	Unknown	Q
Lajos Somló	Hungary	Unknown	Q
Onni Rajasaari	Finland	Unknown	Q
Eugen Haugland	Norway	Unknown	Q
Marten Klasema	Netherlands	Unknown	Q
Basil Dickinson	Australia	Unknown	Q
Billy Brown	United States	Unknown	Q
Bo Ljungberg	Sweden	Unknown	Q
Lennart Andersson	Sweden	Unknown	Q
Sam Richardson	Canada	Unknown	Q
Jovan Mikić	Yugoslavia	Unknown	Q
Sigurður Sigurðsson	Iceland	Unknown	Q
Karl Kotratschek	Austria	Unknown	Q
Chang Chia-gwe	Republic of China	Unknown	
Edward Boyce	Great Britain	Unknown	
Grigorios Lambrakis	Greece	Unknown	
Juan Reccius	Chile	Unknown	
Karol Hoffmann	Poland	Unknown	
Situ Guong	Republic of China	Unknown	
Pedro del Vecchio	Colombia	Unknown	
Wang Shilin	Republic of China	Unknown	

=== Final ===
Rank	Athlete	Nation	1	2	3	4	5	6	Distance	Notes
1st place, gold medalist(s)	Naoto Tajima	Japan	15.76	X	15.44	16.00 WR	15.65	X	16.00	WR
2nd place, silver medalist(s)	Masao Harada	Japan	15.39	15.45	15.42	15.50	15.27	15.66	15.66	
3rd place, bronze medalist(s)	Jack Metcalfe	Australia	15.50	X	14.67	14.83	X	15.20	15.50	
4	Heinz Wöllner	Germany	15.27	X	X	14.53	X	14.23	15.27	
5	Rolland Romero	United States	14.68	X	14.90	X	15.08	15.04	15.08	
6	Kenkichi Oshima	Japan	15.07	X	X	X	X	X	15.07	
7	Erich Joch	Germany	14.88	14.54	14.88	Did not advance			14.88	
8	Dudley Wilkins	United States	14.83	X	14.83	Did not advance			14.83	
9	Olavi Suomela	Finland	13.98	14.72	14.53	Did not advance			14.72	
10	Luz Long	Germany	14.31	14.62	X	Did not advance			14.62	
11	Edward Luckhaus	Poland	14.61	14.13	13.88	Did not advance			14.61	
12	Lajos Somló	Hungary	X	14.12	14.60	Did not advance			14.60	
13	Onni Rajasaari	Finland	14.16	X	14.59	Did not advance			14.59	
14	Eugen Haugland	Norway	X	14.56	14.43	Did not advance			14.56	
15	Marten Klasema	Netherlands	X	14.43	14.55	Did not advance			14.55	
16	Basil Dickinson	Australia	14.48	14.18	X	Did not advance			14.48	
17	Billy Brown	United States	14.20	14.08	14.36	Did not advance			14.36	
18	Bo Ljungberg	Sweden	14.35	13.62	14.28	Did not advance			14.35	
19	Lennart Andersson	Sweden	X	14.26	X	Did not advance			14.26	
20	Sam Richardson	Canada	14.21	X	X	Did not advance			14.21	
21	Jovan Mikić	Yugoslavia	13.71	13.45	13.90	Did not advance			13.90	
22	Sigurður Sigurðsson	Iceland	13.55	13.58	13.14	Did not advance			13.58	
23	Karl Kotratschek	Austria	12.87	13.14	13.15	Did not advance			13.15	
