= Athletics at the 1932 Summer Olympics – Men's triple jump =

Men's triple jump at the Games of the X Olympiad
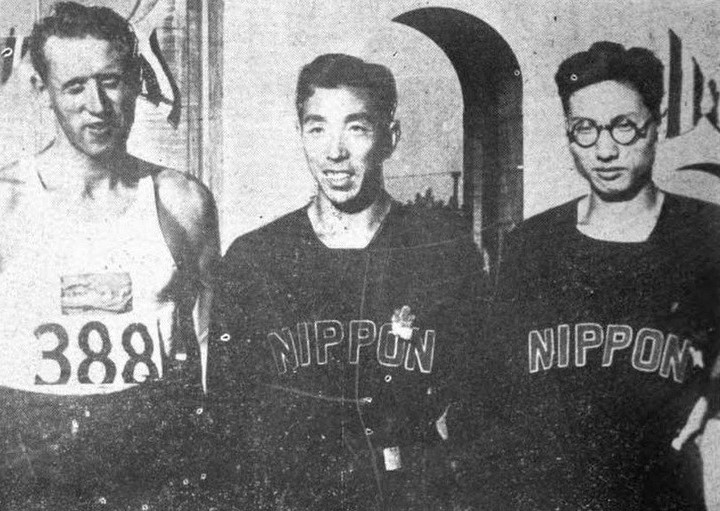
- Svensson, Nambu, and Oshima
- Venue: Los Angeles Memorial Coliseum
- Date: August 4, 1932
- Competitors: 16 from 12 nations
- Winning distance: 15.72 WR

Medalists
1st place, gold medalist(s)		Chūhei Nambu; Japan
2nd place, silver medalist(s)		Erik Svensson; Sweden
3rd place, bronze medalist(s)		Kenkichi Oshima; Japan

The men's triple jump event at the 1932 Olympic Games took place August 4. Sixteen athletes from 12 nations competed. The 1930 Olympic Congress in Berlin had reduced the limit from 4 athletes per NOC to 3 athletes. Chūhei Nambu of Japan won gold with a world record breaking jump. It was Japan's second consecutive gold medal in the men's triple jump; Japan also became the third nation (after the United States and Sweden) to have two medalists in the event in the same Games as Kenkichi Oshima took bronze. Sweden took its first medal in the event since 1920 with Erik Svensson's silver.

== Background ==
This was the ninth appearance of the event, which is one of 12 athletics events to have been held at every Summer Olympics. Returning finalists from the 1928 Games were the two Japanese jumpers, gold medalist Mikio Oda and fourth-place finisher Chūhei Nambu; they were joined this time by Kenkichi Oshima. Oda held the world record, but was injured. Nanbu was the long jump world record holder and had won bronze in that event earlier in the Games.

India, Italy, and Mexico each made their first appearance in the event. The United States competed for the ninth time, having competed at each of the Games so far.

== Competition format ==
The competition was only a final.

== Records ==
These were the standing world and Olympic records (in metres) prior to the 1928 Summer Olympics.

World record	Mikio Oda (JPN)	15.58	Tokyo, Japan	27 October 1931
Olympic record	Nick Winter (AUS)	15.525	Paris, France	12 July 1924

Chūhei Nambu set the new world and Olympic records with 15.72 metres in his fifth jump.

== Schedule ==
Date	Time	Round
Thursday, 4 August 1932	14:30	Final

== Results ==
Rank	Athlete	Nation	1	2	3	4	5	6	Distance	Notes
1st place, gold medalist(s)	Chūhei Nambu	Japan	15.07	14.67	15.22	14.89	15.72 WR	14.85	15.72	WR
2nd place, silver medalist(s)	Erik Svensson	Sweden	14.21	15.32	X	14.70	14.77	X	15.32	
3rd place, bronze medalist(s)	Kenkichi Oshima	Japan	X	X	15.05	X	14.85	15.12	15.12	
4	Eamonn Fitzgerald	Ireland	14.89	15.01	Unknown				15.01	
5	Wim Peters	Netherlands	Unknown						14.93	
6	Sol Furth	United States	Unknown						14.88	
7	Sid Bowman	United States	Unknown						14.87	
8	Rolland Romero	United States	Unknown						14.85	
9	Péter Bácsalmási	Hungary	Unknown						14.33	
10	Francesco Tabai	Italy	Unknown						14.29	
11	Onni Rajasaari	Finland	Unknown						14.20	
12	Mikio Oda	Japan	Unknown						13.97	
13	Nikolaos Papanikolaou	Greece	Unknown						13.92	
14	Mehar Chand Dhawan	India	Unknown						13.66	
15	Salvador Alanís	Mexico	Unknown						13.28	
—	Jack Portland	Canada	X	X	X	X	X	X	No mark	
