= 1934 European Athletics Championships – Men's long jump =

Men's long jump at the European Athletics Championships

The men's long jump at the 1934 European Athletics Championships was held in Turin, Italy, at the Stadio Benito Mussolini on 8 September 1934.

== Medalists ==
Gold	Wilhelm Leichum; Germany
Silver	Otto Berg; Norway
Bronze	Luz Long; Germany

== Results ==
=== Final ===
8 September

Rank	Name	Nationality	Result	Notes
1st place, gold medalist(s)	Wilhelm Leichum	Germany	7.45	CR
2nd place, silver medalist(s)	Otto Berg	Norway	7.31	
3rd place, bronze medalist(s)	Luz Long	Germany	7.25	
4	Robert Paul	France	7.16	
5	Arturo Maffei	Italy	7.12	
6	Henrik Koltai	Hungary	7.01	
7	Jean Studer	Switzerland	6.84	
8	Sándor Dombóvári	Hungary	6.80	
9	Ingvard Andersen	Denmark	6.75	
10	Eric Svensson	Sweden	6.73	
11	Nikolai Küttis	Estonia	6.71	
12	Henri Fejean	Luxembourg	6.62	
13	Francesco Tabai	Italy	6.60	
14	Ludvík Kománek	Czechoslovakia	6.47	
15	François Mersch	Luxembourg	6.38	

== Participation ==
According to an unofficial count, 15 athletes from 11 countries participated in the event.

- Czechoslovakia (1)
- Denmark (1)
- Estonia (1)
- France (1)
- Germany (2)
- Hungary (2)
- Italy (2)
- Luxembourg (2)
- Norway (1)
- Sweden (1)
- Switzerland (1)
