= Deaths in March 2003 =

The following is a list of notable deaths in March 2003.

Entries for each day are listed alphabetically by surname. A typical entry lists information in the following sequence:

- Name, age, country of citizenship at birth, subsequent country of citizenship (if applicable), reason for notability, cause of death (if known), and reference.

== March 2003 ==
=== 1 ===
- Elaine Barrie, 87, American actress (Midnight), fourth wife of John Barrymore.
- Nadine Conner, 96, American operatic soprano, radio singer and music teacher.
- Gauri Deshpande, 61, Indian novelist, short story writer, and poet.
- Franjo Glaser, 90, Croatian footballer.
- Loris Guernieri, 65, Italian racing cyclist.
- Manfred Molzberger, 67, German Olympic long jumper (1960).
- Roger Michael Needham, 68, British computer scientist, pioneered computer password one-way hash functions, cancer.
- Adeyinka Oyekan, 91, Oba of Lagos (1965–2003).
- Countess Viktoria-Luise of Solms-Baruth, 81, German princess.
- Major Sundarrajan, 68, Indian actor and director.

=== 2 ===
- Roger Albertsen, 45, Norwegian footballer, cancer.
- Hank Ballard, 75, American singer (The Midnighters), composer, famous for his hit "The Twist", esophageal cancer.
- William Blezard, 81, English composer and arranger for Noël Coward, Marlene Dietrich, Joyce Grenfell, Honor Blackman.
- Bill Carruthers, 72, American television executive, stroke.
- Joe Decker, 55, American baseball player (Chicago Cubs, Minnesota Twins, Seattle Mariners), fall.
- George Edwards, 94, British aircraft designer.
- Fred Freiberger, 88, American film and television writer and television producer.
- Malcolm Williamson, 71, Australian composer, Master of the Queen's Music.
- Goffredo Petrassi, 98, Italian composer and conductor of modern classical music.
- Albert Reuter, 95, Luxembourgian footballer and Olympian (1928).
- Bill Woggon, 92, American cartoonist who created the comic book Katy Keene.

=== 3 ===
- Gilbert Wheeler Beebe, 90, American epidemiologist and statistician, pioneered radiation exposure studies.
- Ann A. Bernatitus, 91, American U.S. Navy nurse, Legion of Merit for heroism during the siege of Bataan and Corregidor.
- Horst Buchholz, 69, German actor (The Magnificent Seven, One, Two, Three, Life Is Beautiful), pneumonia.
- Dick Garrard, 92, Australian wrestler and Olympian (1936, 1948, 1952).
- Kenta, 54, Swedish musician, cancer.
- Malcolm Kilduff, 75, American journalist.
- Luis Marden, 90, American photographer, explorer, writer, and filmmaker, Parkinson's disease.
- Frances North, 83, American politician, member of the Washington House of Representatives (1973–1983), Parkinson's disease.

=== 4 ===
- Fedora Barbieri, 82, Italian operatic mezzo-soprano and actress.
- Michel Block, 65, Belgian-French pianist.
- Celly Campello, 60, Brazilian rock singer and performer, breast cancer.
- Jaba Ioseliani, 76, Georgian politician, writer, and 'thief in law', heart attack.
- Sébastien Japrisot, 71, French author, screenwriter and film director.
- Erika Kraft, 71, German figure skater and Olympian (1952).
- Fabio Paiella, 63, Italian Olympic diver (1960).
- Oliver Payne Pearson, 87, American zoologist and ecologist.
- Roger Renaux, 77, French Olympic sports shooter (1972).

=== 5 ===
- Edwin Hardy Amies, 93, English fashion designer, official dressmaker for Queen Elizabeth II.
- Marianne Baudler, 81, German chemist.
- George Miller, 61, American stand-up comedian, leukemia.
- Gerhard Rosenfeld, 72, German composer.
- Dzhabrail Yamadayev, 32, Chechen rebel field commander, killed by a bomb.

=== 6 ===
- Linton Garner, 87, American jazz pianist.
- Ernst B. Haas, 78, German-American political scientist.
- Claus Helberg, 84, Norwegian and mountain guide and resistance member during World War II.
- Mickey Kreitner, 80, American baseball player (Chicago Cubs).
- Ramón Mestre, 65, Argentine politician, hepatitis.
- Luděk Pachman, 78, Czechoslovak-German chess grandmaster, chess writer, and political activist.
- Maurice Rheims, 93, French art auctioneer, art historian and novelist.
- Sam Scorer, 80, English architect.
- Gábor Mádi Szabó, 80, Hungarian actor.
- Saba Youakim, 88, Lebanses archbishop.
- Alice Martineau, 30, English singer.

=== 7 ===
- Mehmed Alagić, 55, Bosnian Army general.
- José Márcio Ayres, 49, Brazilian conservationist and zoologist, founded Brazilian rain forest reserves, lung cancer.
- Tzvetana Berkovska, 69, Bulgarian Olympic sprinter (1952).
- Manfred Durniok, 68, German film producer, director and screenwriter, heart attack.
- Klaus Henkes, 73, East German air force general, Director General of Interflug (1978-1982).
- Monica Hughes, 77, Canadian science fiction author.
- Winifred Langton, 93, British communist and activist.
- Al Libke, 84, American baseball player (Cincinnati Reds).
- César Muciño, 31, Mexican Olympic cyclist (1992).

=== 8 ===
- Ibrahim al-Makadmeh, 51, Palestinian Hamas leader in the Gaza Strip, air strike.
- Cho Byung-hwa, 81, South Korean poet.
- Carlos Cañete, 62, Argentine boxer and Olympian (1960).
- Adam Faith, 62, British singer and actor, heart attack.
- Stanisław Fołtyn, 66, Polish footballer and Olympian (1960).
- Wallace M. Greene, 95, United States Marine Corps four-star general.
- Eduard Izotov, 66, Soviet film actor.
- Elliott Jaques, 86, Canadian psychoanalyst and social scientist who coined the term "midlife crisis".
- Mickey McGowan, 81, American baseball player (New York Giants).
- Karen Morley, 93, American film actress and political activist, pneumonia.
- José Manuel Blecua Teijeiro, 90, Spanish philologist and academic.

=== 9 ===
- Stan Brakhage, 70, American filmmaker, bladder cancer.
- Žarko Dolinar, 82, Croatian biologist and table tennis player.
- Bernard Dowiyogo, 57, President of Nauru, cardiac complications from diabetes.
- Rolf Hagedorn, 83, German theoretical physicist.
- Erich Joch, 90, German Olympic triple jumper (1936).
- Dzidra Ritenberga, 74, Latvian actress and film director.
- Seppo Simola, 66, Finnish shot putter and Olympian (1972).

=== 10 ===
- Víctor Alba, 86, Spanish communist politician, journalist, writer and academic.
- Tom Boardman, Baron Boardman, 84, British businessman and politician (MP for Leicester South West, Leicester South).
- Geoffrey Kirk, 81, British classical scholar.
- Marina Ladynina, 94, Soviet stage and film actress.
- Barry Sheene, 52, British motorcycle racer and television sports presenter, esophageal cancer.
- Fritz Spengler, 94, German field handball player and Olympic champion (1936).
- Naftali Temu, 57, Kenyan long-distance runner and Olympic champion (1964, 1968, 1972), prostate cancer.
- Ion Țîrcovnicu, 66, Romanian footballer.
- Ottorino Volonterio, 85, Swiss Formula One race car driver.

=== 11 ===
- Brian Cleeve, 81, Anglo-Irish writer, heart attack.
- Alta Cohen, 94, American baseball player (Brooklyn Robins/Dodgers, Philadelphia Phillies).
- John G. Dow, 97, American politician (U.S. Representative for New York's 27th congressional district).
- Ivar Hansen, 64, Danish politician and speaker of the Folketing.
- Kevin Laffan, 80, British playwright and screenwriter (Emmerdale), pneumonia.
- Sidney Lippman, 89, American composer and songwriter.
- Edson Raff, 95, American Army officer and writer.
- Ludwig Streicher, 82, Austrian contrabassist.
- Wayne D. Wright, 86, American horse racing jockey, winner of all three Triple Crown races.

=== 12 ===
- Herb Banet, 89, American football player (Green Bay Packers).
- Alys Faiz, 87, Pakistani writer and human rights activist.
- Howard Fast, 88, American novelist.
- Andrey Kivilev, 29, Kazakhstani road bicycle racer (2001 Route du Sud), and Olympian (1996, 2000), fall during Paris–Nice race.
- Nikolay Kulpin, 34, Kazakhstani boxer and Olympian (1992).
- Slava Stetsko, 82, Ukrainian politician.
- Lynne Thigpen, 54, American actress (The District, The Paper, Where in the World Is Carmen Sandiego?), Tony winner (1997), cerebral hemorrhage.
- Zoran Đinđić, 50, Serbian politician, Prime Minister (2001–2003), shot.

=== 13 ===
- Abas Ermenji, 89, Albanian politician, historian and nationalist.
- Sigurður Th. Jónsson, 78, Icelandic Olympic swimmer (1948).
- Enriko Josif, 78, Serbian composer, pedagogue and musical writer.
- Norbert Kohler, 72, German Olympic wrestler (1952).
- Roberto Murolo, 91, Italian musician.
- Barry Patten, 75, Australian Olympic alpine skier (1952), and architect.
- Ian Samwell, 66, English musician, singer-songwriter and record producer.
- Christiane Schmidtmer, 63, German actress, fashion model and nude model.
- Gus Yatron, 75, American politician (U.S. Representative for Pennsylvania's 6th congressional district).

=== 14 ===
- Suresh Bhat, 70, India marathi poet.
- Eugene Boyko, 80, Canadian filmmaker.
- Harmon Craig, 76, American geochemist.
- Amanda Davis, 32, American writer and teacher, plane crash.
- Al Gionfriddo, 81, American baseball player (Pittsburgh Pirates, Brooklyn Dodgers).
- Jack Goldstein, 57, American artist, suicide by hanging.
- Otto Horber, 90, Swiss Olympic sports shooter (1948, 1952).
- Jean-Luc Lagardère, 75, French businessman, CEO of the Lagardère Group, acute disseminated encephalomyelitis.
- Ivan Rassimov, 64, Serbian-Italian film actor.
- Ron Shoop, 71, American baseball player (Detroit Tigers).

=== 15 ===
- John Andru, 70, Canadian Olympic fencer (1964, 1968).
- Yevgeny Belyayev, 48, Soviet cross-country skier and Olympian (1976, 1980).
- Joseph Coors, 85, American businessman, president of Coors Brewing Company, lymphoma.
- Thora Hird, 91, British actress, comedian, presenter and writer, stroke.
- Enrique Parra, 77, Chilean Olympic basketball player (1948).
- Bill Robertson, 79, British footballer.
- Li Xuefeng, 96, Chinese politician.

=== 16 ===
- Lawrence H. Aller, 89, American astronomer.
- George Bayer, 77, American golfer, won three PGA Tour events, heart attack.
- Rachel Corrie, 23, American International Solidarity Movement activist, crushed by Israeli Defense Forces bulldozer.
- Ronald Ferguson, 71, father of UK royal divorcée Sarah Ferguson, heart attack.
- Davis Hughes, 92, Australian politician.
- Lars Passgård, 62, Swedish actor and theatre director.
- Teemu Raimoranta, 25, Finnish metal musician, fall.

=== 17 ===
- Herbert Aptheker, 87, American historian and political activist.
- Thomas N. Barnes, 72, American Chief Master Sergeant of the Air Force, cancer.
- Su Buqing, 100, Chinese mathematician.
- Bill Carlisle, 94, American country music singer, songwriter and comedian.
- Henryk de Kwiatkowski, 79, Polish-Canadian businessman and thoroughbred horse owner and breeder, pneumonia.
- Yvette Etiévant, 80, French actress.
- Erich Hänel, 87, German footballer.
- Alan Keith, 94, British broadcaster.
- Klaus Oldendorff, 69, German Olympic sailor (1968).
- Yoshihiro Onishi, 61, Japanese Olympic rower (1964).
- Charles Salatka, 85, American prelate of the Roman Catholic Church.
- Robert Shelton, 73, American clansman, heart attack.
- Iuliu Szabo, 62, Romanian Olympic ice hockey player (1964, 1968).

=== 18 ===
- József Balla, 47, Hungarian wrestler and Olympian (1976, 1980), heart failure.
- Oles Berdnyk, 76, Ukrainian science fiction writer, philosopher and theologian.
- Naomi Chance, 75, English film and television actress.
- Peggy Conklin, 96, American film, television and theater actress.
- Bruno Heim, 92, Swiss ecclesiastical diplomat, Apostolic Nuncio to Britain.
- Karl Kling, 92, German racing driver.
- Viktor Kratasyuk, 54, Soviet and Georgian sprint canoer and Olympic champion (1972).
- Maurice Moreau, 75, Canadian politician, member of the House of Commons of Canada (1963-1965).
- Adam Osborne, 64, British-American computer pioneer (Osborne 1).
- Leo Skladany, 75, American football player (Pittsburgh Panthers, Philadelphia Eagles, New York Giants).
- Monk Williams, 58, American football player (Cincinnati Bengals).

=== 19 ===
- Joe Buzas, 83, American baseball player (New York Yankees) and minor league baseball team owner.
- Micheline Coulibaly, 53, Ivorian short story writer.
- Hiromichi Fuyuki, 42, Japanese professional wrestler and promoter, cancer.
- Émile Genest, 81, Canadian actor, heart attack.
- Olivier Long, 87, Swiss diplomat and director-general of the GATT.
- Michael Mathias Prechtl, 76, German illustrator.
- Rick Zumwalt, 51, American arm-wrestler and actor, heart attack.

=== 20 ===
- Al Blades, 26, American professional football player (University of Miami, San Francisco 49ers), car accident.
- Krishanu Dey, 41, Indian football player, pulmonary disorder.
- Alberto López, 76, Argentine basketball player and Olympian (1952).
- Sailor Art Thomas, 79, American professional wrestler, cancer.
- Richard W. Vollmer Jr., 77, American district judge (United States District Court for the Southern District of Alabama).

=== 21 ===
- Harry Eisenstat, 87, American baseball player (Brooklyn Dodgers, Detroit Tigers, Cleveland Indians).
- Leonard Hokanson, 71, American pianist, pancreatic cancer.
- Shivani, 79, Indian writer.
- Umar Wirahadikusumah, 78, Indonesian fourth Vice President (1983–1988).

=== 22 ===
- Jim Anderson, 59, Australian politician.
- Fernando Carcupino, 80, Italian painter, illustrator and comics artist.
- Amado Cortez, 75, Filipino actor and diplomat.
- Milton George Henschel, 82, American Jehovah's Witnesses executive and president of the Watch Tower Society.
- Tadashi Kitta, 68, Japanese golfer.
- Terry Lloyd, 50, British ITN reporter, shot by US forces in crossfire near Basra, Iraq.
- Paul Moran, 39, Australian photojournalist, killed by suicide bomber.
- Ali Akbar Navis, 78, Indonesian author, poet, and humorist.

=== 23 ===
- Hideyo Amamoto, 77, Japanese actor, complications from pneumonia.
- Newton Canegal, 85, Brazilian footballer.
- Violet Cliff, 86, British pair skater and Olympian (1936).
- Zed Coston, 87, American football player (Philadelphia Eagles).
- Tage Nielsen, 74, Danish composer, teacher and music administrator.
- Mohsen Nourbakhsh, 54, Iranian economist, heart attack.
- Lori Piestewa, 23, United States Army soldier, killed in action.
- Pier Luigi Romita, 78, Italian politician.
- Allen G. Schwartz, 68, American district judge (United States District Court for the Southern District of New York).
- Fritz Spiegl, 77, Austrian-English musician, journalist, and broadcaster.

=== 24 ===
- Jan Just Bos, 63, Dutch Olympic rower (1960, 1964).
- Nick Costes, 76, American Olympic long-distance runner (1956).
- Albert De Deken, 87, Belgian footballer.
- Jesús Domínguez, 77, Spanish swimmer and Olympian (1948).
- Jess Dow, 86, American college football player and coach (Southern Connecticut Owls).
- Hans Hermann Groër, 83, Austrian Roman Catholic Archbishop of Vienna (1986–1995), pneumonia.
- Murray Hill, 79, Australian realtor and politician.
- Hussein Kamal, 70, Egyptian television, film and theatre director.
- Yevgeny Klevtsov, 74, Russian cyclist and Olympic medalist (1952, 1960).
- Zdzisław Krzyszkowiak, 73, Polish track and field athlete and Olympian (1956, 1960).
- Del Loranger, 83, American basketball player.
- Don Raffell, 83, American musician and educator.
- Artie Shapiro, 87, American jazz bassist.
- Philip Yordan, 88, American screenwriter (Broken Lance, Detective Story, Dillinger), Oscar winner (1955), pancreatic cancer.

=== 25 ===
- Masato Furuoya, 45, Japanese actor, suicide by hanging.
- Vernon Hughes, 81, American physicist specializing in subatomic particles.
- Michael Kidron, 72, British cartographer and Marxist theorist.
- Mikhail Ryzhak, 76, Ukrainian water polo player and Olympic medalist (1956).

=== 26 ===
- Hans Brandenberger, 90, Swiss sculptor.
- Chuck Hansen, 55, American historian and U.S. nuclear program documents collector, cancer.
- Daniel Patrick Moynihan, 76, American politician, sociologist, and diplomat, complications following appendectomy.
- Babatunji Olowofoyeku, 85, Nigerian politician, educationist and lawyer.
- Tauese Sunia, 61, Governor of American Samoa, heart attack.
- José Tamayo, 82, Spanish theatre director and producer.
- Rolf Thomsen, 87, German U-boat commander during World War II.
- Nino Vingelli, 90, Italian film actor.
- Dorothy Clarke Wilson, 98, American writer (Prince of Egypt).
- Herbert Zangs, 78, German artist.

=== 27 ===
- Edwin Carr, 76, New Zealand composer of classical music.
- Daniel Ceccaldi, 75, French actor, liver cancer.
- Jeremiah Duggan, 22, British student, traffic accident.
- Fiorenzo Fiorentini, 82, Italian actor, author, screenwriter and radio personality, cerebral hemorrhage.
- Frederic Lawrence Holmes, 71, American historian of science.
- Pat Kelly, 37, American football player (Denver Broncos, New York Jets).
- Dušan Spasojević, 34, Serbian criminal, killed by police.
- Paul Zindel, 66, American playwright (The Effect of Gamma Rays on Man-in-the-Moon Marigolds), lung cancer.

=== 28 ===
- Kadri Aytaç, 71, Turkish football player and manager, Alzheimer's disease.
- Sam Bowens, 65, American baseball player (Baltimore Orioles, Washington Senators).
- Robert Craddock, 79, American soccer player.
- Jesús Díez, 71, Spanish fencer and Olympian (1960).
- Rusty Draper, 80, American country and pop singer, pneumonia.
- Ludwig Elsbett, 89, German mechanical engineer.
- Aleksey Kuznetsov, 73, Soviet cross-country skier and Olympic medalist (1960).
- Bob Matz, 90, American animator.

=== 29 ===
- Placide Adams, 73, American string bass player, drummer and vocalist.
- Keinosuke Enoeda, 67, Japanese master of Shotokan karate.
- Kurt Gimmi, 67, Swiss road bicycle racer.
- Tadao Horie, 89, Japanese football player and Olympian (1936), pneumonia.
- Kerim Kerimov, 85, Soviet and Russian astrophysicist and aerospace engineer.
- Chris Kropman, 83, Dutch Olympic cyclist (1936).
- Vladimir Pikalov, 78, Soviet general.
- Hans Potthof, 92, Swiss painter and Olympic canoeist (1936).
- Carl Ridd, 73, Canadian scholar of religion, Olympic basketball player (1952), and activist.
- Matthew J. Ryan, 70, American politician.
- Herbjørn Sørebø, 69, Norwegian journalist and broadcasting personality.
- Carlo Urbani, 46, Italian WHO physician and microbiologist who discovered SARS, SARS.

=== 30 ===
- Robert Leroy Anderson, 33, American murderer and self-proclaimed serial killer, suicide by hanging.
- Bruno Boni, 87, Italian rower and Olympian (1948).
- Vincent DePaul Breen, 66, American prelate of the Roman Catholic Church.
- Nick Enright, 52, Australian dramatist, playwright and theatre director, melanoma.
- Michael Jeter, 50, American actor (Evening Shade, The Fisher King, The Green Mile), Emmy winner (1992), epilepsy.
- Adalat Mamedov, 28, Azerbaijani Olympic boxer (1996).
- Valentin Pavlov, 65, Soviet official, Prime Minister (1991), stroke.
- Teno Roncalio, 87, American politician and writer, heart attack.
- Patricia Vinnicombe, 71, South African-Australian archaeologist and art preservationist.

=== 31 ===
- Lucian Adams, 80, American U.S. Army World War II soldier and Medal of Honor recipient.
- Charly Bouvy, 60, Belgian Olympic bobsledder and field hockey player (1964 bobsleigh, 1968 field hockey, 1972 field hockey).
- Pierre Buret, 79, French Olympic sailor (1960).
- George Connor, 78, American football player (Notre Dame, Chicago Bears), member of the Pro Football Hall of Fame.
- Harold Scott MacDonald Coxeter, 96, British-Canadian geometer, academic and author.
- Anne Gwynne, 84, American actress, stroke.
- Semyon Lipkin, 91, Russian writer, poet, and literary translator.
- Hal Moore, 79, American Olympic wrestler (1948).
- Tommy Seebach, 53, Danish singer, composer, pianist and producer, heart attack.
- Fermín Vélez, 43, Spanish sports car racing driver, cancer.
