= Kenkichi Oshima =

Japanese triple jumper

Ōshima Kenkichi
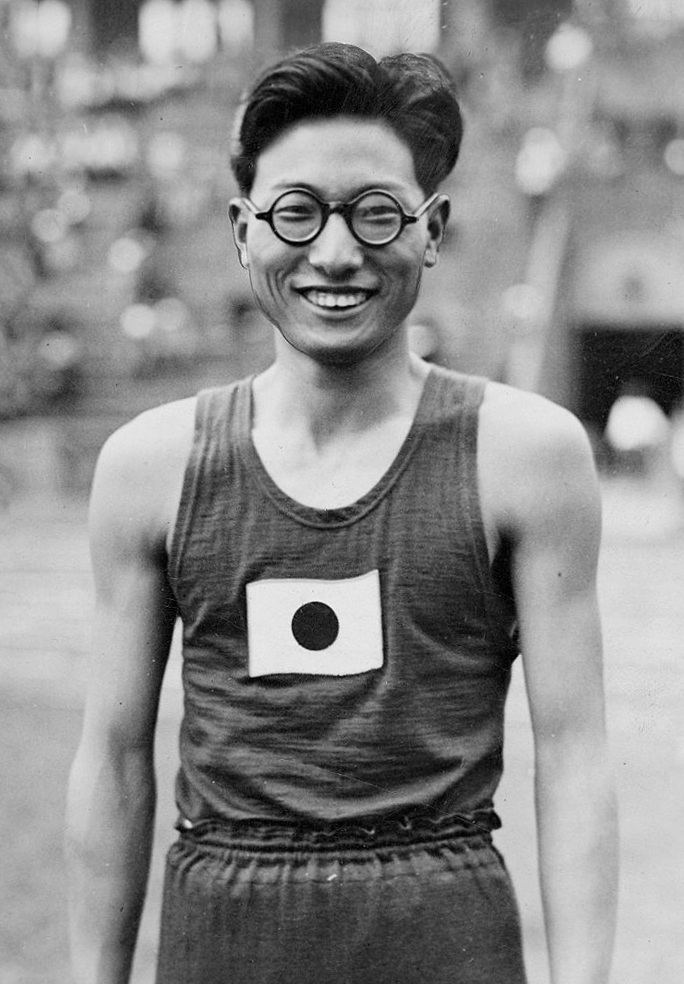
- Kenkichi Oshima in 1932

Personal information
- Native name: 大島 鎌吉
- Nationality: Japanese
- Born: November 10, 1908 Kanazawa, Ishikawa, Japan
- Died: March 30, 1985 (aged 76).
- Education: Kansai University
- Height: 1.75 m (5 ft 9 in)
- Weight: 67 kg (148 lb)

Sport
- Sport: Athletics
- Event: Triple Jump
Medal record
Representing Japan
Olympic Games
Bronze medal – third place	1932 Los Angeles	Triple Jump

Kenkichi Oshima (大島 鎌吉, Ōshima Kenkichi; November 10, 1908 – March 30, 1985) was a Japanese triple jumper who won a bronze medal at the 1932 Summer Olympics in Los Angeles. He was the flag bearer for Japan at the 1936 Games in Berlin.

Ōshima was born in Kanazawa, Ishikawa Prefecture, Japan. While still a student, he set a new unofficial world record for the triple jump, and was widely expected to secure the gold medal in the 1932 Los Angeles Olympics. However, Ōshima suffered from severe burns in a bathing accident shortly before the start of the Olympics, and was not in the best form for the competition. He finished third with a jump of 15.12 meters behind the teammate Chuhei Nambu who took gold. Ōshima also participated in the same event in the 1936 Summer Olympics in Berlin, but came in sixth place, while teammates Naoto Tajima and Masao Harada took the gold and silver medals, respectively.

Fluent in the German language, during the Berlin Olympics, Ōshima had a 20-minute interview of Adolf Hitler, who apparently mistook Ōshima for a Japanese military attache of the same surname. Ōshima asked Hitler many questions on Nazi initiatives to improve on the physical education of German youth.

After graduation from Kansai University, Ōshima was employed by the Mainichi Shimbun, working as a reporter in the sports section of the newspaper until retirement. He then accepted the post of professor emeritus and later vice president of Osaka University of Health and Sport Sciences, where he undertook reforms of the athletic department to strengthen the Japanese team in preparation for the 1964 Tokyo Olympics. He was also an honorary member of the International Olympic Committee and an author of numerous books on sports.
