= 1938 European Athletics Championships – Men's triple jump =

Men's triple jump at the European Athletics Championships

The men's triple jump at the 1938 European Athletics Championships was held in Paris, France, at Stade Olympique de Colombes on 4 September 1938.

== Medalists ==
Gold	Onni Rajasaari; Finland
Silver	Jouko Norén; Finland
Bronze	Karl Kotratschek; Germany

== Results ==
=== Final ===
4 September

Rank	Name	Nationality	Result	Notes
1st place, gold medalist(s)	Onni Rajasaari	Finland	15.32	CR
2nd place, silver medalist(s)	Jouko Norén	Finland	14.95	
3rd place, bronze medalist(s)	Karl Kotratschek	Germany	14.73	
4	Ioannis Palamiotis	Greece	14.70	NR
5	Vittorio Turco	Italy	14.64	
6	Lennart Andersson	Sweden	14.56	
7	Franco Bini	Italy	13.96	
8	Jean Nichil	France	13.88	NR
9	Bicoku Sefedin	Albania	13.68	
10	Max Roujoux	France	13.24	
11	François Mersch	Luxembourg	12.93	

== Participation ==
According to an unofficial count, 11 athletes from 8 countries participated in the event.

- Albania (1)
- Finland (2)
- France (2)
- Germany (1)
- Greece (1)
- Italy (2)
- Luxembourg (1)
- Sweden (1)
