= Kenshi =

Kenshi may refer to:

- A practitioner of kendo
- Kenshi (video game), a 2018 role-playing video game
- Kenshi (Mortal Kombat), a character from the Mortal Kombat video game series
- Kenshi (given name), a Japanese given name
- Kenshi Security, an AI-powered Technical Intelligence company.
