= Volner =

Volner or Völner is a Hungarian language occupational surname for a wool worker (from German Wolle wool, cf. Wollner) and may refer to:

- János Volner (1969), far-right Hungarian politician
- Pál Völner (1962), Hungarian jurist and politician
