= Otto Berg =

Otto Berg may refer to:

- Otto Berg (athlete) (1906–1991), Norwegian long jumper
- Otto Karl Berg (1815–1866), German botanist who named the Feijoa
- Otto Berg (scientist) (1874–1939), German scientist who co-discovered rhenium
