= Bäumle =

Bäumle is a German surname. Notable people with the surname include:

- Artur Bäumle (1906–1943), German athlete
- Martin Bäumle (born 1964), Swiss scientist and politician

== See also ==
- Baume (surname)
