= 1938 European Athletics Championships – Men's long jump =

Men's long jump at the European Athletics Championships

The men's long jump at the 1938 European Athletics Championships was held in Paris, France, at Stade Olympique de Colombes on 3 September 1938.

== Medalists ==
Gold	Wilhelm Leichum; Germany
Silver	Arturo Maffei; Italy
Bronze	Luz Long; Germany

== Results ==
=== Final ===
3 September

Rank	Name	Nationality	Result	Notes
1st place, gold medalist(s)	Wilhelm Leichum	Germany	7.65	CR
2nd place, silver medalist(s)	Arturo Maffei	Italy	7.61	
3rd place, bronze medalist(s)	Luz Long	Germany	7.56	
4	István Gyuricza	Hungary	7.27	
5	Ruudi Toomsalu	Estonia	7.24	
6	William Breach	Great Britain	7.16	
7	Jean Studer	Switzerland	7.14	
8	Jean Baudry	France	7.11	
9	François Mersch	Luxembourg	7.05	
10	Robert Joanblancq	France	7.04	
11	Åke Stenqvist	Sweden	7.01	
12	Grigorios Lambrakis	Greece	6.94	
13	Vilmos Vermes	Hungary	6.82	

== Participation ==
According to an unofficial count, 13 athletes from 10 countries participated in the event.

- Estonia (1)
- France (2)
- Germany (2)
- Greece (1)
- Hungary (2)
- Italy (1)
- Luxembourg (1)
- Sweden (1)
- Switzerland (1)
- Great Britain (1)
