= Basil Dickinson =

Australian long and triple jumper

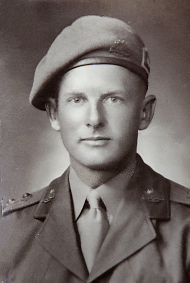

Personal information
- Born: 25 April 1915 Queanbeyan, New South Wales, Australia
- Died: 7 October 2013 (aged 98) Queanbeyan, New South Wales, Australia
- Height: 178 cm (5 ft 10 in)
- Weight: 73 kg (161 lb)

Sport
- Sport: Athletics
- Events: Triple jump, long jump
- Club: New South Wales

Achievements and titles
- Personal best: TJ – 15.64 m (1935)
Medal record
Representing Australia
British Empire Games
Bronze medal – third place	1938 Sydney	Long jump
Bronze medal – third place	1938 Sydney	Triple jump

John Basil Charles Dickinson (25 April 1915 – 7 October 2013) was an Australian athlete who competed at the 1936 Summer Olympics.

== Biography ==
Born in Queanbeyan, Dickinson attended Sydney Boys High School, graduating in 1932. At the 1936 Summer Olympics he struggled with an injury; after finishing 16th in the triple jump he withdrew from the long jump.

Dickinson won the Australian title in the triple jump in 1934 and 1936–37. He finished second behind fellow Australian Jack Metcalfe in the triple jump event at the British 1936 AAA Championships.

One month later he was selected to represent Australia at the 1936 Olympic Games held in Berlin.

At the 1938 Empire Games, he earned bronze medals in both the long jump and triple jump, and in 1939 he won the New South Wales decathlon title. This was his last athletics competition, as the same year he enlisted in the Second Australian Imperial Force. After World War II he worked in insurance and remained involved in athletics as an administrator. He was the chief judge of the jumping events at the 1956 Melbourne Olympics.

After the death of Bill Roycroft on 29 May 2011, Dickinson was recognised as Australia's oldest surviving Olympian, and as the last surviving member of the Australian 1936 Olympic team. He died on 7 October 2013, aged 98.
