= Men's long jump Italian record progression =

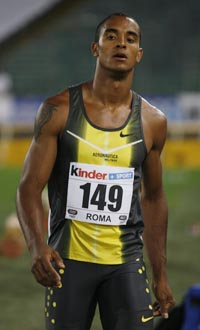
Andrew Howe current Italian recordman.

The Italian record progression men's long jump is recognised by the Italian Athletics Federation (FIDAL).

== Record progression ==
Breaking down barriers

Record	Athlete	Venue	Date
6.40	Arturo Nespoli	(Italy) Milan	11 October 1919
6.49	Arturo Nespoli	(Italy) Milan	3 July 1920
6.76	Arturo Nespoli	(Italy) Treviso	9 June 1922
6.85	Adolfo Contoli	(Italy) Bologna	18 June 1922
6.86	Virgilio Tommasi	(Italy) Busto Arsizio	26 August 1923
6.92	Virgilio Tommasi	(Italy) Genoa	12 April 1924
6.93	Virgilio Tommasi	(Italy) Bologna	20 September 1924
6.995	Virgilio Tommasi	(Italy) Bologna	12 October 1924
7.17	Virgilio Tommasi	(Italy) Bologna	13 April 1925
7.25	Virgilio Tommasi	(Hungary) Budapest	16 September 1928
7.41	Virgilio Tommasi	(Italy) Bologna	21 September 1929
7.42	Arturo Maffei	(Italy) Bologna	17 May 1936
7.50	Arturo Maffei	(Italy) Bologna	29 June 1936
7.50	Gianni Caldana	(Italy) Florence	14 July 1936
7.73	Arturo Maffei	(Germany) Berlin	4 August 1936
7.91	Giuseppe Gentile	(Poland) Chorzów	17 August 1968
7.95	Mario Lega	(Italy) Salsomaggiore	30 April 1980
7.98	Marco Piochi	(Italy) Rome	11 April 1981
8.07	Giovanni Evangelisti	(Italy) Riccione	22 August 1982
8.09	Marco Piochi	(Italy) Milan	22 June 1983
8.09	Giovanni Evangelisti	(Italy) Rovereto	7 September 1983
8.15	Giovanni Evangelisti	(Italy) Milan	2 June 1984
8.16	Giovanni Evangelisti	(Italy) Milan	9 June 1984
8.24	Giovanni Evangelisti	(United States) Los Angeles	6 August 1984
8.24	Giovanni Evangelisti	(Italy) Caorle	27 July 1986
8.31	Giovanni Evangelisti	(Italy) San Giovanni Valdarno	16 May 1987
8.43	Giovanni Evangelisti	(Italy) San Giovanni Valdarno	16 May 1987
8.47	Andrew Howe	(Japan) Osaka	30 August 2007

== See also ==
- List of Italian records in athletics
- Women's long jump Italian record progression
