= Jiří Hoffmann =

Czech long jumper

Personal information
- Nationality: Czechoslovak
- Born: 24 May 1908
- Died: 23 November 1985 (aged 77)

Sport
- Sport: Athletics
- Event: Long jump

Jiří Hoffmann (24 May 1908 – 23 November 1985) was a Czechoslovak athlete. He competed in the men's long jump at the 1936 Summer Olympics.
