= Eamonn Fitzgerald (athlete) =

Irish athlete (1903–1958)

Personal information
- Nationality: Irish
- Born: 27 October 1903 Caherdaniel, Kerry, Ireland
- Died: 9 June 1958 (aged 54) Dublin, Ireland

Sport
- Sport: Athletics
- Event: Triple jump
- Club: UCD

Achievements and titles
- Personal bests: 15.01m (Los Angeles, 1932)
Medal record
Representing Ireland
Tailteann Games
Bronze medal – third place	1928 Dublin	Triple jump

Eamonn Fitzgerald (27 October 1903 – 9 June 1958) was an Irish athlete. He competed in the men's triple jump at the 1932 Summer Olympics.
