= Wollner =

Wollner is a German language occupational surname for a wool worker and may refer to:

- Gertrude Price Wollner (1900–1985), American writer and composer
- Rolf Wollner (1906–1988), German field hockey player
- Sandra Wollner (born 1983), Austrian film director and screenwriter

== See also ==
- Birger Wøllner Gaarn (1881–1949), Danish composer
- Heinz Wöllner (1913–1945), German athlete
- Johann Christoph von Wöllner (1732–1800), Prussian politician
- Wollner Building, in Pennsylvania, United States
