= Karl Kotratschek =

Austrian triple jumper

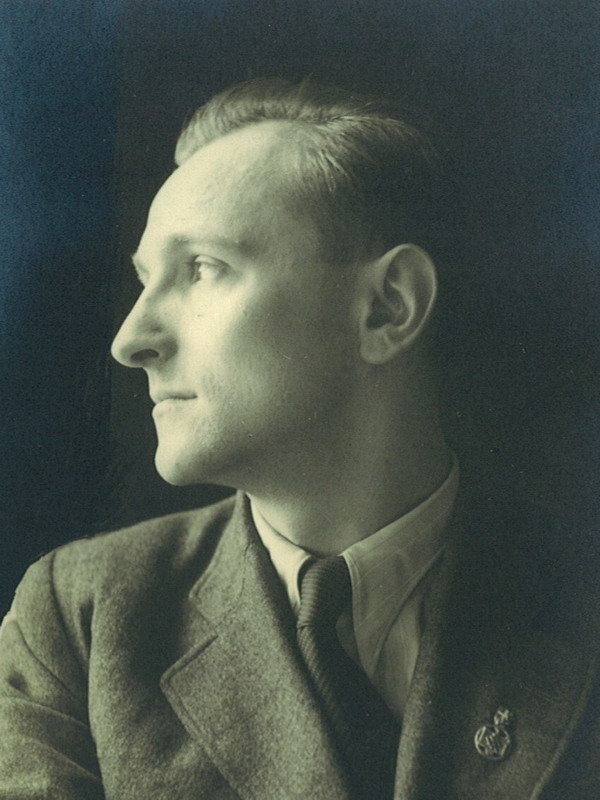

Personal information
- Nationality: Austrian
- Born: 24 October 1914 Vienna, Austria-Hungary
- Died: 1941 (aged 26–27) North Africa

Sport
- Sport: Athletics
- Event: Triple jump
Medal record
Men's athletics
Representing Germany
European Championships
Bronze medal – third place	1938 Paris	Triple jump

Karl Kotratschek (24 October 1914 – 1941) was an Austrian athlete. He competed in the men's triple jump at the 1936 Summer Olympics. He was killed in action during World War II.
