= Edward Luckhaus =

Polish athlete

Personal information
- Nationality: Polish
- Born: 31 August 1910 Hlukhiv, Chernigov Governorate, Imperial Russia
- Died: 12 May 1975 (aged 64) Pfaffenhofen an der Ilm, Bavaria, West Germany

Sport
- Sport: Athletics
- Event: Triple jump

Edward Gustaw Adolf Luckhaus (31 August 1910 – 12 May 1975) was a Polish athlete of German ethnicity. He competed in the men's triple jump at the 1936 Summer Olympics.

During World War II he volunteered to Wehrmacht, fought on the Eastern Front and was taken as prisoner of war, being incarcerated in the POW camp in Gomel. After being released in 1948, he moved to Bavaria, where he lived with his family in Pfaffenhofen near Munich. He worked as a physical education teacher initially in the Benedictine monastery in Scheyern, later at the gymnasium in Pfaffenhofen.
