= Arturo Maffei =

Italian long jumper and footballer (1909-2006)

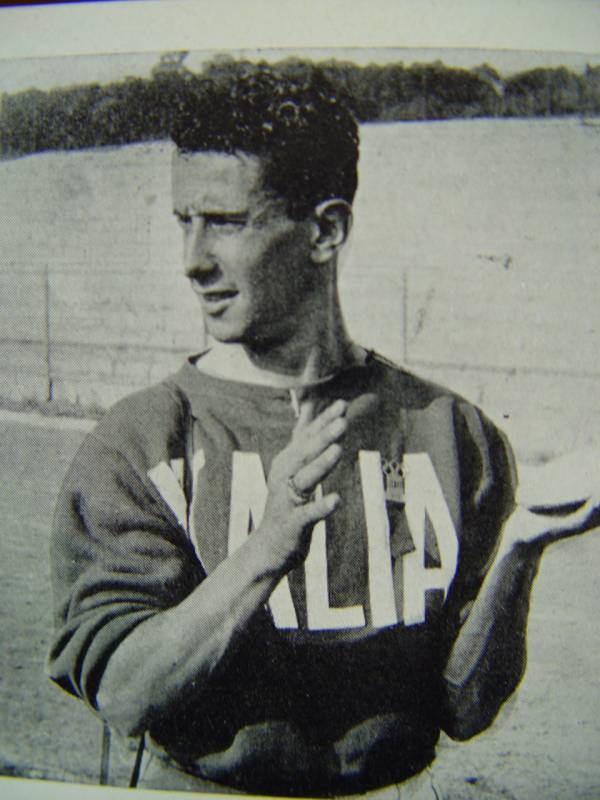

Personal information
- Nationality: Italian
- Born: 9 November 1909 Viareggio, Italy
- Died: 17 August 2006 (aged 96) Torre del Lago, Italy
- Height: 1.76 m (5 ft 9 1/2 in)
- Weight: 64 kg (141 lb)

Sport
- Country: Italy
- Sport: Athletics
- Event: Long jump
- Club: Giglio Rosso Florence

Achievements and titles
- Personal best: Long jump: 7.73 m (1936)
Medal record
Men's athletics
Representing Italy
European Championships
Silver medal – second place	1938 Paris	Long jump

Arturo Maffei (9 November 1909, in Viareggio – 17 August 2006, in Torre del Lago) was an Italian long jumper and footballer, who played as a goalkeeper.

== Biography ==
He was the Italian long jump champion in 1930, 1932, 1935, 1936, 1937, 1938, 1939 and 1940. His eight national championships tied with Attilio Bravi for the most of all time. He competed in 87 local and regional competitions between 1938 and 1951, collecting 66 wins, 16 second places, 3 third places and 2 non-podium finishes. He competed in 43 international competitions between 1930 and 1941, collecting 27 wins, 9 second places, 2 third places, and 5 non-podium finishes.

Maffei finished second behind Hannes de Boer in the long jump event at the 1931 AAA Championships, and placed first in that competition in 1938. He placed fifth at the 1934 European Championships in Turin, with a mark of 7.12 meters. He won a silver medal in the 1938 Championships in Paris, with a mark of 7.61 meters, although an unofficial winning mark of 7.78 meters was supposedly not counted due to a judge's mistake. He tied for fourth in the 1936 Summer Olympics in Berlin, with a mark of 7.73 meters.

He first set the Italian long jump record on 19 May 1936 during Olympic trials with a distance of 7.42 meters, beating Virgilio Tommasi's 1929 mark of 7.41 meters. He broke his own mark on 29 June 1936 during the Italian Championships, with a mark of 7.50 meters. He broke his own national record again on 4 August 1936, with his Olympic mark of 7.73 meters. This mark stood as the Italian record until 17 August 1968, when Giuseppe Gentile set a mark of 7.91 meters.

Maffei won the British AAA Championships title in the long jump event at the 1938 AAA Championships.

He played for ACF Fiorentina from 1926 until 1931, and joined the team's coaching staff from 1941 until 1956 as an athletic and goalkeeping coach under manager Fulvio Bernardini.

== Achievements ==
Year	Competition	Venue	Position	Event	Measure	Notes
1934	European Championships	(Italy) Turin	5th	Long jump	7.12 m	
1936	Olympic Games	(Germany) Berlin	4th	Long jump	7.73 m	NR
1938	AAA Championships	(United Kingdom) London	1st	Long jump	7.52 m	
1938	European Championships	(France) Paris	2nd	Long jump	7.61 m	

== See also ==
- Men's long jump Italian record progression
