= Robert Kennedy (high jumper) =

British athlete

Personal information
- Nationality: British (Scottish)
- Born: 20 January 1916 Edinburgh, Scotland
- Died: 28 May 2004 (aged 88)

Sport
- Sport: Athletics
- Event: High jump
- Club: University of Cambridge; Achilles Club

Robert Kirk Inches Kennedy (20 January 1916 – 28 May 2004) was a British athlete who competed at the 1936 Summer Olympics.

== Biography ==
At the 1936 Olympic Games in |Berlin, Kennedy competed in the men's high jump competition.

Kennedy finished second behind Richard O'Rafferty in the high jump event at the 1938 AAA Championships.
