= Dudley Wilkins =

American triple jumper

Dudley Griffin Wilkins (November 11, 1914 – February 1989) was an American triple jumper. He was United States champion in 1934 and placed eighth at the 1936 Summer Olympics.

== Biography ==
Wilkins was born in Crowley, Louisiana on November 11, 1914. He won the Amateur Athletic Union (AAU) national triple jump championship in 1934 with a jump of 48 ft 21/100 in (14.69 m). At the 1936 Olympic Trials Wilkins placed second with 49 ft 1 1/2 in (14.97 m), qualifying for the American team together with Rolland Romero and Billy Brown; all three were from Louisiana, which had been America's leading triple jump state since the late 1920s. At the Olympics in Berlin Wilkins placed eighth, reaching 14.83 m (48 ft 7 3/4 in) in both the first and the third round and fouling in round two; he did not qualify for the last three rounds.

Wilkins set his personal best, 49 ft 9 in (15.16 m), in Baton Rouge on May 4, 1935. He died in Crowley in February 1989.
