= Kenshi (given name) =

- Gender: Male

Origin
- Origin: Japanese
- Meaning: Different meanings depending on the kanji used

Kenshi (written: 研之, 玄師, 健史, 拳士, 憲史, 健士, 健嗣, or 建之) is a masculine Japanese given name. Notable people with the name include:

- Daigō Kenshi (大豪 健嗣; born 1952), Japanese sumo wrestler
- Kenshi Hirokane (弘兼 憲史; born 1947), Japanese manga artist
- Kenshi Sugiya (杉谷 拳士; born 1991), Japanese baseball player
- Takanohana Kenshi (貴ノ花 健士; 1950–2005), Japanese sumo wrestler
- Kenshi Togami (戸上 研之; 1912–?), Japanese long jumper
- Kenshi Yonezu (米津 玄師; born 1991), Japanese musician
