= Claude Heim =

French long jumper

Personal information
- Nationality: French
- Born: 29 September 1912
- Died: 28 May 2002 (aged 89)

Sport
- Sport: Athletics
- Event: Long jump

Claude Heim (29 September 1912 – 28 May 2002) was a French athlete. He competed in the men's long jump at the 1936 Summer Olympics.
