= Onni Rajasaari =

Finnish athletics competitor

Personal information
- Full name: Onni Rafael Rajasaari
- Nationality: Finland
- Born: 2 March 1910 Hanko, Uusimaa
- Died: 12 November 1994 (aged 84) Hanko
- Height: 174 cm (5 ft 9 in)
- Weight: 69 kg (152 lb)

Sport
- Country: Finland
- Sport: Athletics
- Events: Long jump, Triple jump
- Club: Helsingin Kisa-Veikot; Hangon Hyrskyt
Medal record
Men's athletics
Representing Finland
European Championships
Gold medal – first place	1938 Paris	Triple jump
Bronze medal – third place	1934 Turin	Triple jump

Onni Rafael Rajasaari (2 March 1910 in Hanko – 12 November 1994 in Hanko) was a Finnish athlete specializing in the long jump and triple jump. He took part in the 1932 Summer Olympics and in the 1936 Summer Olympics, but is best known for becoming European champion in triple jump in 1938 in Paris. In the summer of 1939, Rajasaari set a new European record in triple jump, as he jumped 15.52 meters at a competition in Lahti.

== National titles ==
- Finnish Athletics Championships
  - Triple jump: 1933, 1934, 1935, 1936, 1937, 1938, 1939
  - Long jump: 1938

== International competitions ==
Year	Competition	Venue	Position	Event	Notes
Representing Finland
1932	Olympic Games	Los Angeles, USA	11th	Triple Jump	14.20 m
1934	European Championships	Turin, Italy	3rd	Triple Jump	14.74 m
1936	Olympic Games	Berlin, Germany	25th (q)	Long jump	x
1936	Olympic Games	Berlin, Germany	11th	Triple jump	14,20 m
1938	European Championships	Paris, France	1st	Triple Jump	15.32 m

== Personal bests ==
Event	Best	Venue	Date
Triple jump	15.52 m	Lahti, Finland	16 July 1939

Last updated 29 July 2015.
