= Max Berendson =

Peruvian long jumper

Personal information
- Nationality: Peruvian
- Born: 18 May 1917
- Died: 30 August 1984 (aged 67)

Sport
- Sport: Athletics
- Event: Long jump

Max Berendson (18 May 1917 – 30 August 1984) was a Peruvian athlete. He competed in the men's long jump at the 1936 Summer Olympics.
