= Marten Klasema =

Dutch athlete

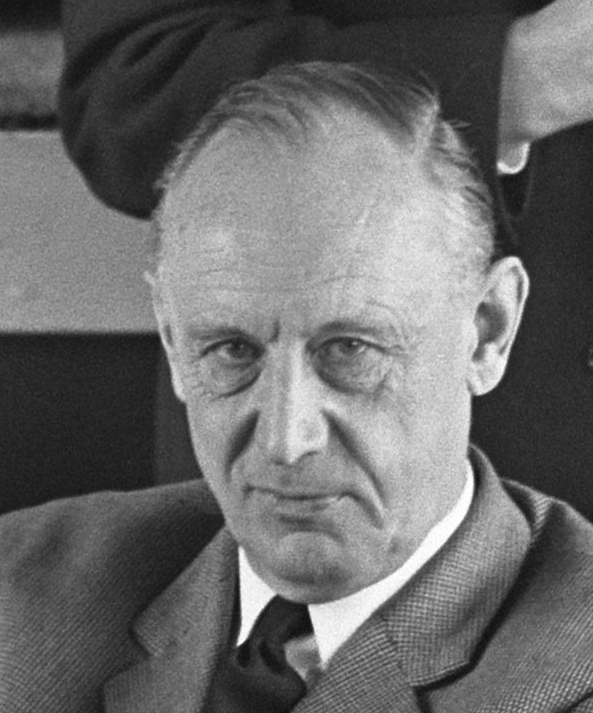
- Marten Klasema in 1968

Personal information
- Nationality: Dutch
- Born: 12 May 1912
- Died: 1 November 1974 (aged 62)

Sport
- Sport: Athletics
- Events: Long jump Triple jump

Marten Klasema (12 May 1912 – 1 November 1974) was a Dutch athlete. He competed in the men's long jump and the men's triple jump at the 1936 Summer Olympics.
