= Sigurður Sigurðsson =

Icelandic athlete

Personal information
- Nationality: Icelandic
- Born: 22 April 1914
- Died: 12 April 1982 (aged 67)

Sport
- Sport: Athletics
- Events: Triple jump High jump

Sigurður Sigurðsson (22 April 1914 – 12 April 1982) was an Icelandic athlete. He competed in the men's triple jump and the men's high jump at the 1936 Summer Olympics.
