= Jovan Mikić =

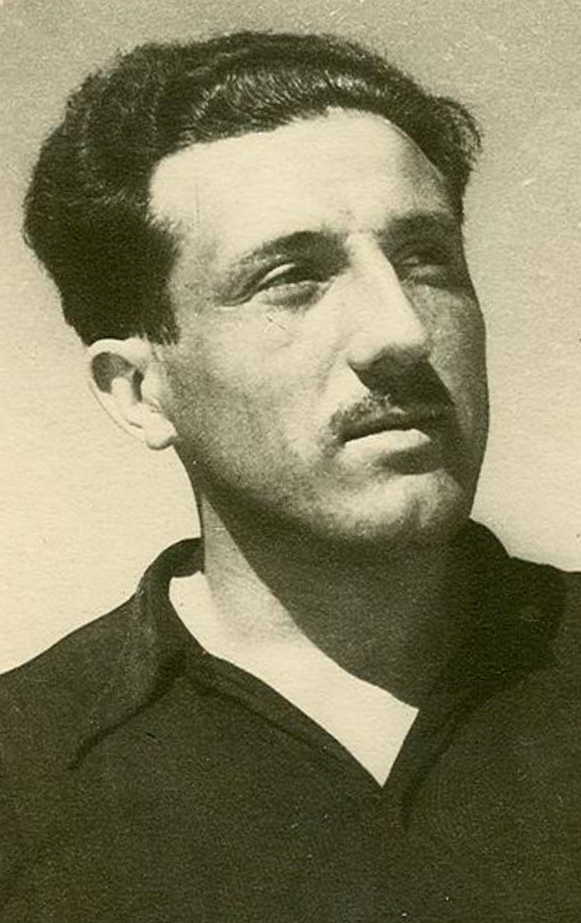
- Born: 13 May 1914; Ópáva, Kingdom of Hungary, Austria-Hungary
- Died: 11 October 1944 (aged 30); Szabadka, Hungary
- Resting place: Monument to the Victims of Fascism, Subotica
- Occupation: Athletics

Jovan Mikić (Serbo-Croatian Cyrillic: Јован Микић; 13 May 1914 – 11 October 1944), nicknamed Spartak, was a Yugoslav record holder in athletics. He competed in the men's triple jump at the 1936 Summer Olympics.

== Biography ==
Jovan Mikić was born on May 13, 1914, in Ópáva, Kingdom of Hungary (now Opovo, Serbia). He was the fourth child of his mother Darinka, a teacher, and father Alexander, a school supervisor. After World War I he moved with his family to Subotica. There he finished Gymnasium (school) and college. He studied at the Subotica Law School with a strong influence from Mija Mirković. In 1939 he was admitted as an assistant in market economy school. He then applied for the docent position, but was interrupted by World War II. Mikić spoke several languages from childhood, wrote Poetry, and was an above-average athlete. From 1932 till 1939 he was Yugoslavia's best pentathlete, decathlete, long jumper, discus thrower and javelin thrower. Twice a Balkan champion, Mikić was Yugoslavia's Olympic Games representative.

In 1941, Mikić moved to Novi Sad with his wife Ksenija and their son Alexander. Jovan Mikić was an anti-fascist and one of the commandants of Partisan resistance movement in Hungarian-annexed region of Bačka (Bácska). He was shot on 10 October 1944, by a Hungarian soldier at Subotica (Szabadka) train station. He died on October 11, 1944.
