= André Prébolin =

French long jumper

Personal information
- Nationality: French
- Born: 19 March 1906
- Died: 12 June 1997 (aged 91)

Sport
- Sport: Athletics
- Event: Long jump

André Prébolin (19 March 1906 – 12 June 1997) was a French athlete. He competed in the men's long jump at the 1936 Summer Olympics.
