= Lajos Somló =

Hungarian triple jumper

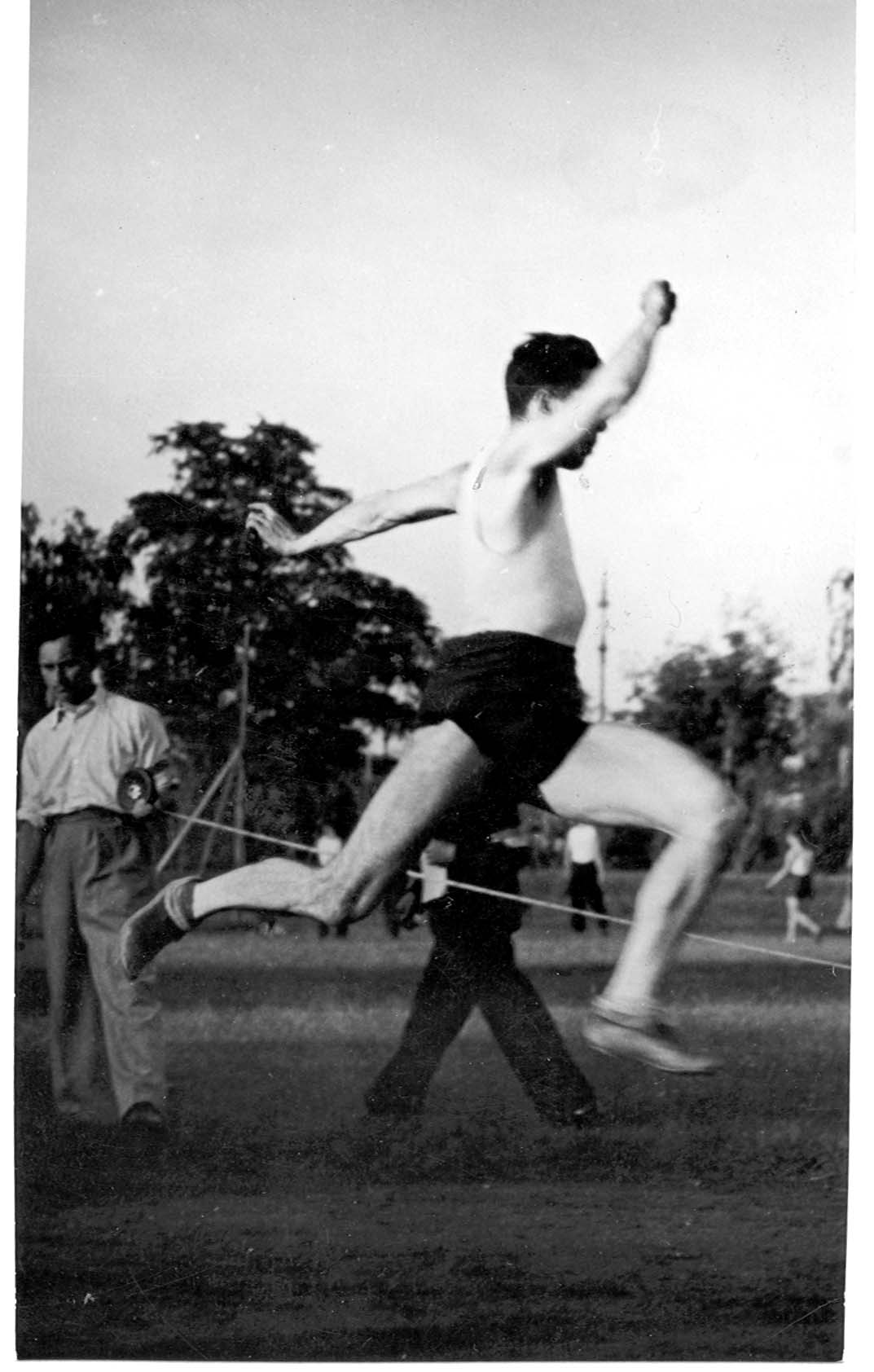

Personal information
- Nationality: Hungarian
- Born: 19 August 1912 Budapest, Hungary
- Died: 4 August 1990 (aged 77) Budapest, Hungary

Sport
- Sport: Athletics
- Event: Triple jump

Lajos Somló (19 August 1912 – 4 August 1990) was a Hungarian athlete. He competed in the men's triple jump at the 1936 Summer Olympics.
