= Josef Vosolsobě =

Czech sportsman and journalist

Personal information
- Nationality: Czech
- Born: 3 January 1905 Jindřichův Hradec, Austria-Hungary
- Died: 4 April 1986 (aged 81) Prague, Czechoslovakia

Sport
- Sport: Athletics
- Event: Long jump

Josef Vosolsobě (3 January 1905 – 4 April 1986) was a Czech athlete. He competed in the men's long jump at the 1936 Summer Olympics.

After World War II, he worked as a sport journalist at ČTK.
