= Rudolf Polame =

Czech long jumper

Personal information
- Nationality: Czechoslovak
- Born: 28 March 1910 Přerov, Austria-Hungary
- Died: 6 January 1996 (aged 85) Ostrava, Czech Republic
- Height: 1.82 m (6 ft 0 in)
- Weight: 154 lb (70 kg)

Sport
- Sport: Athletics
- Event: Long jump

Rudolf Polame (28 March 1910 – 6 January 1996) was a Czechoslovak athlete. He competed in the men's long jump at the 1936 Summer Olympics.
