= Carlos de la Guerra =

Peruvian long jumper

Personal information
- Full name: Carlos de la Guerra Roose
- Born: 28 July 1912 Trujillo, Peru
- Died: 5 June 1987 (aged 74) Lima, Peru

Sport
- Sport: Athletics
- Event: Long jump

Carlos de la Guerra (28 July 1912 – 5 June 1987) was a Peruvian athlete. He competed in the men's long jump at the 1936 Summer Olympics.
