= Luz Long =

German long jumper and Wehrmacht Heer Soldier (1913–1943)

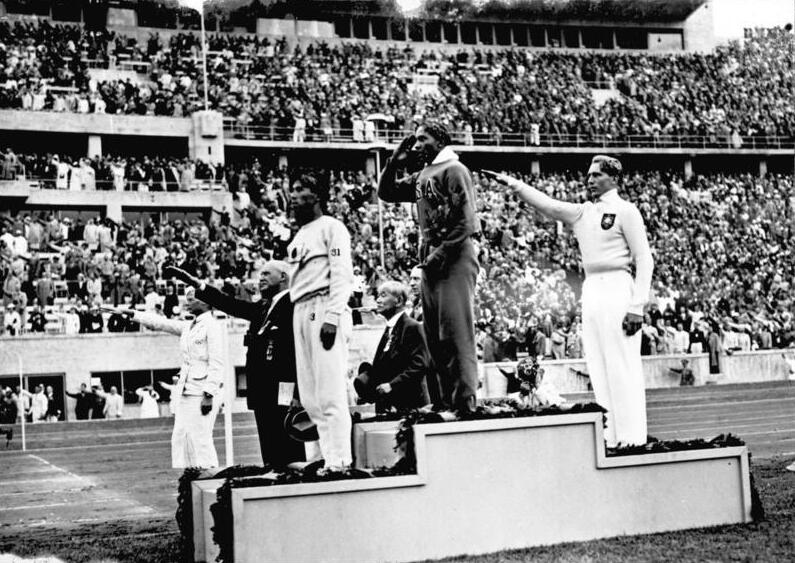
- (L–R) Naoto Tajima, Jesse Owens, and Long

Personal information
- National team: Germany
- Born: Carl Ludwig Long; 27 April 1913 Leipzig, Kingdom of Saxony, German Empire
- Died: 14 July 1943 (aged 30) Acate, Sicily, Kingdom of Italy
- Height: 1.84 m (6 ft 0 in)
- Military career
- Allegiance: Nazi Germany
- Branch: German Army
- Service years: 1941–1943
- Conflicts: World War II: Italian Campaign; Allied Invasion of Sicily †
- Awards: Unknown
Medal record
Men's athletics
Representing Germany
Olympic Games
Silver medal – second place	1936 Berlin	Long jump
European Championships
Bronze medal – third place	1934 Turin	Long jump
Bronze medal – third place	1938 Paris	Long jump

Carl Ludwig "Luz" Long (27 April 1913 – 14 July 1943) was a German Olympic long jumper who won the silver medal in the event at the 1936 Summer Olympics in Berlin and had a friendship with Jesse Owens, who won the gold medal in that event. Luz Long won the German long jump championship six times: in 1933, 1934, 1936, 1937, 1938, and 1939.

Long was killed while serving in the German Army under the Wehrmacht during World War II.

== Early life ==
Long was born in Leipzig on 27 April 1913. He studied law at the University of Leipzig, where in 1936 he joined the Leipziger Sport Club. After graduating, he practiced as a lawyer in Hamburg while continuing his interest in sport.

== 1936 Olympic Games ==
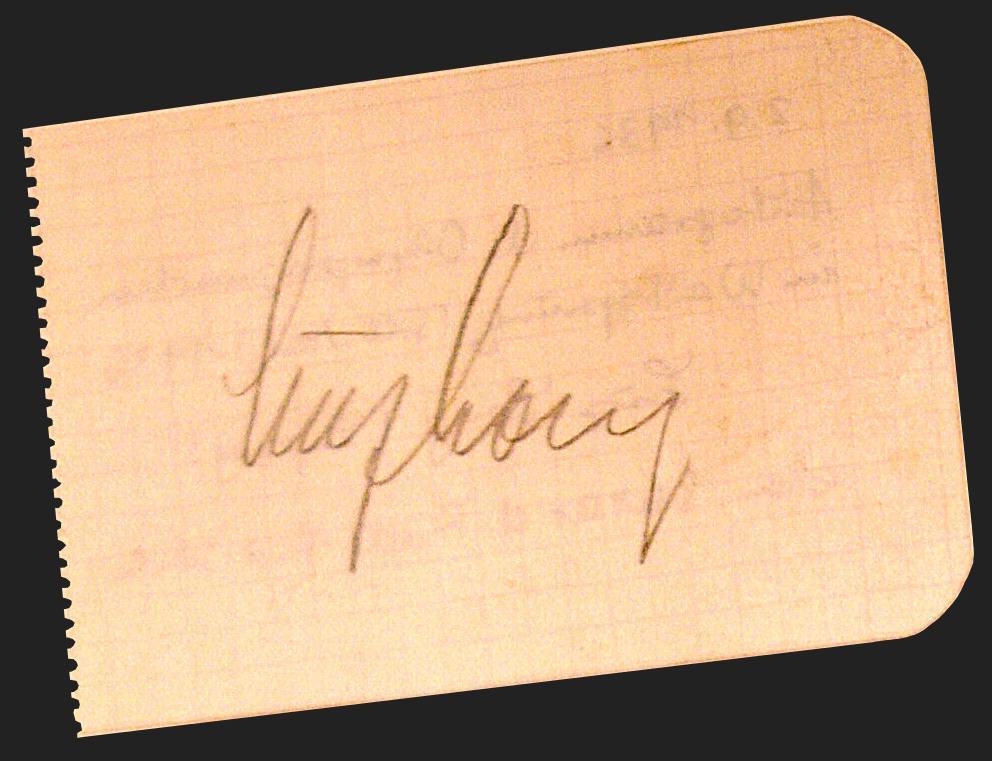
Autograph signed after his Olympic medal win

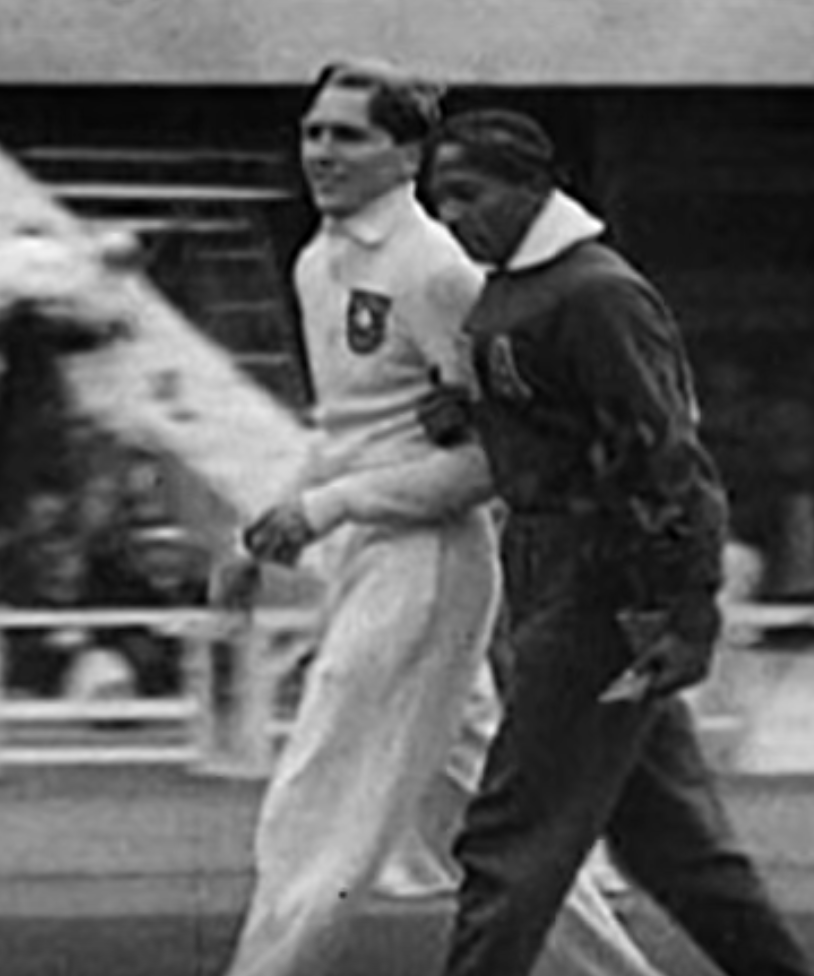
Luz Long walking arm in arm with Jesse Owens through the Berlin Olympic Stadium

The 21-year-old, 1.84-metre-tall (6 ft 0½ in) Long had finished third in the 1934 European Championships in Athletics with 7.25 metres (23 ft 9½ in). By the summer of 1936, Long held the European record in the long jump and was eager to compete for the first time against Jesse Owens, the American world-record holder. The long jump on 4 August was Long's first event against Owens, and Long met his expectations by setting an Olympic record during the preliminary round. In contrast, Owens fouled on his first two jumps. Knowing that he needed to reach at least 7.15 metres (about 23 ft 5½ in) on his third jump in order to advance to the finals in the afternoon, Owens sat on the field, dejected.

In the 1966 documentary Jesse Owens Returns to Berlin, Owens relates a story that Long came over to offer advice before Owens's third jump. According to the story, Long said that Owens should jump from a few inches before the takeoff board. This would reduce the measured distance but avoid the risk of another fault; the theory was that Owens would still clear the required distance even with the handicap of jumping early. However, this conversation is apocryphal; Grantland Rice was watching Owens the entirety of the qualifying round and did not see him speak to Long. Tom Ecker relates that he asked Owens about the story in 1965 and Owens admitted that it was not true, but just a good story. On his third qualifying jump, Owens was calm and jumped with at least four inches (10 centimeters) to spare, easily qualifying for the finals. In the finals competition later that day, the jumpers exceeded the old Olympic record five times.

Owens went on to become Olympic champion in the long jump with 8.06 metres (26 ft 5¼ in) while besting Long's own record of 7.87 metres (25 ft 9¾ in). Long won the silver medal for second place and was the first to congratulate Owens: they posed together for photos and walked arm-in-arm to the dressing room. Owens said, "It took a lot of courage for him to befriend me in front of Hitler... I would melt down all the medals and cups I have and they wouldn't be a plating on the twenty-four karat friendship that I felt for Luz Long at that moment". Long's competition with Owens is recorded in Leni Riefenstahl's documentary Olympia – Fest der Völker.

Two days later, Long finished 10th in the triple jump.

He went on to win the British AAA Championships title in the long jump event at the 1937 AAA Championships and finish third in the 1938 European Championships in Athletics long jump with 7.56 metres (24 ft 9½ in).

== World War II ==
Long served in the Wehrmacht during World War II, having the rank of Obergefreiter. During the Allied invasion of Sicily in Italy, Long was wounded on 10 July 1943, in the battle for the Biscari-Santo Pietro airfield, and died four days later in a British military hospital. He was buried in the war cemetery of Motta Sant'Anastasia in Sicily.

There is an urban myth that Long sent a letter to Owens from the battlefield, requesting that Owens visit Long's son if Long were to die. Long is supposed to have asked Owens to explain to the boy how life was before people were divided by the war. Such a letter has never been seen by the families of Owens or Long, nor would it be likely that Long could send a letter to the United States while in the German military. Additionally, the letter is often reported as having come from North Africa, a theatre that Long did not serve in.

After the war, Owens travelled to Germany to meet Luz's son, Kai-Heinrich Long (1941‍–‍2021), who was seen with Owens in the 1966 documentary Jesse Owens Returns To Berlin, where they conversed in the Berlin Olympic Stadium.

== Memorials ==
Roads near sports facilities in Long's home town of Leipzig, and in the Munich Olympia Park of 1972, are named after him. His medal, photos, and documents were donated to the Sportmuseum Leipzig.

== In popular culture ==
- In the film The Jesse Owens Story (1984), he is portrayed by Kai Wulff.
- In the film Race (2016), he is played by David Kross.
