= Wang Shilin =

Chinese triple jumper

Personal information
- Nationality: Chinese
- Born: 13 October 1914

Sport
- Sport: Athletics
- Event: Triple jump

Wang Shilin (born 13 October 1914, date of death unknown) was a Chinese athlete. He competed in the men's triple jump at the 1936 Summer Olympics.
