= Feng Nianhua =

Chinese basketball player

Personal information
- Nationality: Chinese
- Born: 5 May 1914

Sport
- Sport: Basketball

Feng Nianhua (born 5 May 1914, date of death unknown) was a Chinese basketball player. He competed in the men's tournament at the 1936 Summer Olympics.
