= Billy Brown (athlete) =

American sprinter

William Tennant Brown (August 3, 1918 – December 29, 2002) was an American triple jumper, long jumper and sprinter. Between 1936 and 1943 he won six national outdoor championship titles in the triple jump and three in the long jump. He was the long jump world leader in 1941 and held the American record in the triple jump from 1941 to 1956. He competed in the triple jump at the 1936 Summer Olympics, placing 17th.

== Early life ==
Brown was born in Baker, Louisiana on August 3, 1918. He studied at Baker High School and led the school's track and field team; additionally, he was a good scholastic basketball player. He set long-standing Louisiana state high school records in both the long jump (then known as the broad jump) and the triple jump (then hop, step and jump); his triple jump mark was a national high school record.

Brown won his first national (AAU) senior championship title in the triple jump as a high school junior in 1936; he jumped 49 ft 2 in (14.98 m), defeating both defending champion Rolland Romero and 1934 champion Dudley Wilkins. He also won the AAU junior championship that year. At the 1936 United States Olympic Trials, held separately a week after the AAU meet, Brown placed third behind Romero and Wilkins with a jump of 49 ft 1 in (14.96 m); the top three qualified for the Olympic Games in Berlin. The 17-year-old Brown was the youngest athlete on the men's Olympic track squad. In Berlin he was not at his best and placed 17th, reaching 14.36 m (47 ft 1 3/4 in) on his best attempt.

== Collegiate career ==
Brown repeated as AAU triple jump champion in 1937, jumping 49 ft 7 1/4 in (15.11 m). After graduating from high school he went to Louisiana State University (LSU), where he was coached by Bernie Moore; Moore's coaching emphasized the sprints and the long jump rather than the triple jump, which before 1959 was not contested at the NCAA championship meet in non-Olympic years. Brown lost the AAU triple jump title in 1938, when he placed third. During his collegiate career Brown set LSU school records in the long jump, the triple jump, the 100-yard dash and the 220-yard dash.

In April 1939 Brown set his personal long jump best (25 ft 4 3/4 in / 7.74 m) in a triangular meet against Rice University and Texas, but was then sidelined by injuries. He recovered to place second with 24 ft 8 3/4 in (7.53 m) at the 1939 NCAA championships. At the 1940 NCAA meet Brown was again second in the long jump (behind Jackie Robinson), also second in the 220 yards, and third in the 100 yards; he was the top scorer of the meet. Brown regained the AAU triple jump title in 1940, jumping 50 ft 2 5/8 in (15.30 m) for a then personal best; he also won his first AAU long jump title that year.

Brown won his only NCAA title in 1941, winning the long jump with a jump of 24 ft 7 1/4 in (7.50 m); in addition, he was second in the 100 yards and third in the 220 yards, and was the leading scorer of the meet for the second consecutive year. At the 1941 AAU championships he repeated as triple jump champion with 50 ft 11 1/2 in (15.53 m); the jump was his lifetime best, and broke Dan Ahearn's old American record from 1911 by half an inch. He also repeated as AAU long jump champion, just missing his personal best with a leap of 25 ft 4 1/2 in (7.73 m). Brown finished 1941 as world leader in the long jump (with his AAU jump) and joint world leader in the 100-yard dash at 9.5; his triple jump mark ranked him third in the world.

== Later life ==
Brown graduated from LSU in 1941 and joined the United States Navy, but continued his track career. He won his last national titles as a Navy athlete; he successfully defended both the long jump and triple jump AAU titles in 1942, and won his final national title in the triple jump in 1943. After receiving his discharge from the Navy Brown had a long business career with Kaiser Aluminum, eventually becoming the company's vice president; he retired in 1983. He died in Baton Rouge, Louisiana on December 29, 2002.

Records
Preceded by Dan Ahearn	United States record holder in men's triple jump June 29, 1941 – June 30, 1956	Succeeded by Ira Davis
