= Albert De Deken =

Belgian footballer

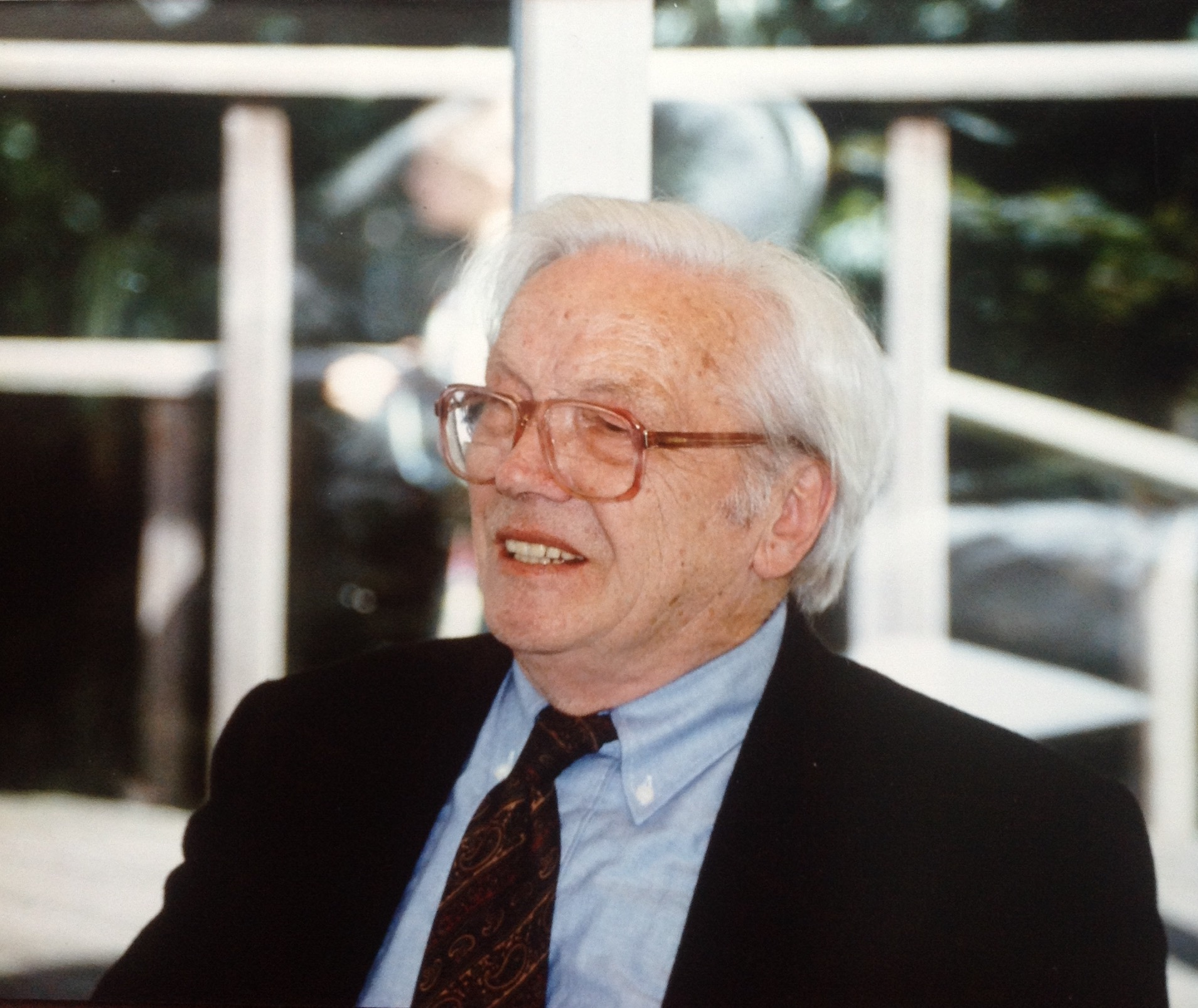
- Albert De Deken

Personal information
- Date of birth: 7 September 1915
- Place of birth: Schoten
- Date of death: 24 March 2003 (aged 87)

International career
Years	Team	Apps	(Gls)
1936	Belgium	1	(0)

Albert De Deken (7 September 1915, Schoten – 24 March 2003) was a Belgian painter and footballer.

== Career ==
He played in one match for the Belgium national football team in 1936.

He studied at the Royal Academy of Fine Arts in Antwerp and after World War II, he focused mainly on painting. In 1948 he stayed in Paris, where he was involved with the Académie de la Grande Chaumière. From 1954 to 1980, he instructed at Antwerp's Royal Academy of Fine Arts, where he taught students such as Panamarenko, Linda Loppa and Wannes Van de Velde.
