= Rolland Romero =

American triple jumper

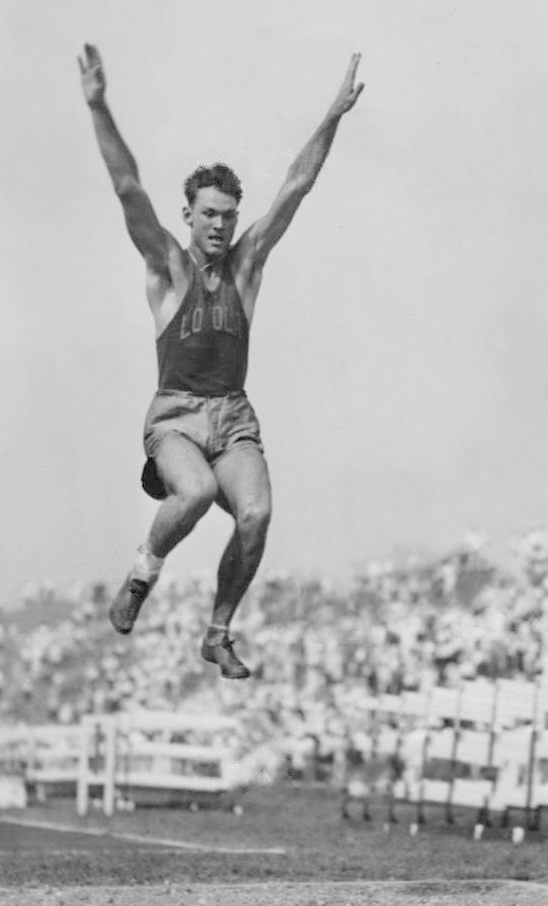
- Romero at the 1936 Olympic Trials

Personal information
- Born: August 21, 1914 Welsh, Louisiana, U.S.
- Died: November 25, 1975 (aged 61) Welsh, Louisiana, U.S.
- Height: 180 cm (5 ft 11 in)
- Weight: 85 kg (187 lb)

Sport
- Sport: Athletics
- Events: Triple jump, long jump
- Club: Loyola Wolfpack, New Orleans

Achievements and titles
- Personal bests: TJ – 15.36 m (1936); LJ – 7.56 m (1935)

Rolland Lee Romero (August 21, 1914 – November 25, 1975) was an American triple jumper. He was national champion in 1935 and competed in the 1932 and 1936 Summer Olympics.

== Biography ==
Romero was born in Welsh, Louisiana on August 21, 1914. At Welsh High School he played football and competed in a variety of track and field events. From the fall of 1931 he attended Loyola University New Orleans, receiving an athletic scholarship midway through his freshman year; originally, the 120 yard hurdles were his main event, but he dropped it soon due to awkward falls and turned to the triple jump.

Romero developed rapidly; his season best in 1932 was 49 ft 10 1/4 in (15.20 m), the best jump by an American since Dan Ahearn in 1913. At the 1932 United States Olympic Trials he was second behind Sidney Bowman with a jump of 48 ft 10 1/4 in (14.89 m), qualifying for the Olympics in Los Angeles. Romero placed eighth at the Olympics, reaching 14.85 m (48 ft 8 1/2 in) on his best jump; as a 17-year-old, he was the youngest athlete on the American track team.

Romero scored his only national championship title at the 1935 Amateur Athletic Union (AAU) meet, jumping 50 ft 4 7/8 in (15.36 m) and breaking Ahearn's meeting record. He set his personal best, 50 ft 8 3/4 in (15.46 m), in Houston on June 5, 1936. Romero lost to newcomer Billy Brown at the 1936 AAU meet, but won with 49 ft 9 in (15.16 m) at the Olympic Trials the following week. He qualified for the 1936 Summer Olympics in Berlin, where he jumped 15.08 m (49 ft 5 1/2 in) and placed fifth; he was the best of the Americans.

Romero died on November 25, 1975.
