= Poh Kimseng =

Chinese sprinter (1912–1980)

Personal information
- Nationality: Chinese
- Born: 6 April 1912 Straits Settlements
- Died: July 1980 Singapore

Chinese name
- Chinese: 傅金城
- Hanyu Pinyin: Fù Jīnchéng
- Hokkien POJ: Pò͘ Kimsêng

Sport
- Sport: Sprinting
- Event: 100 metres

Poh Kimseng (6 April 1912 – July 1980) was a Chinese sprinter. He lived in British Malaya, and competed at the 6th Republic of China National Games (中華民國全國運動會) in Shanghai in October 1935, where he won gold in the men's 200 metres. He went on to compete in the men's 100 metres at the 1936 Summer Olympics.
