= Yu Jingxiao =

Chinese basketball player

Personal information
- Nationality: Chinese
- Born: 16 November 1911

Sport
- Sport: Basketball

Yu Jingxiao (born 16 November 1911, date of death unknown) was a Chinese basketball player. He competed in the men's tournament at the 1936 Summer Olympics.
