= Chen Kingkwan =

Chinese sprinter

Personal information
- Nationality: Chinese
- Born: 3 January 1913
- Died: 1 May 2000 (aged 87)

Sport
- Sport: Sprinting
- Event: 100 metres

Chen Kingkwan (3 January 1913 – 1 May 2000) was a Chinese sprinter. He competed in the men's 100 metres at the 1936 Summer Olympics.
