= Huang Yingjie =

Chinese sprinter (1912–1999)

Personal information
- Nationality: Chinese
- Born: 1 March 1912 Baisha, China
- Died: 12 May 1999 (aged 87) Vancouver, British Columbia, Canada

Sport
- Sport: Sprinting
- Event: 4 × 100 metres relay

Huang Yingjie (1 March 1912 – 12 May 1999) was a Chinese sprinter. He competed in the men's 4 × 100 metres relay at the 1936 Summer Olympics. Prior to the Olympics, he set a new national record in the 110 meter hurdles, a record that stood for almost two decades.
