= Willy Rasmussen (Danish athlete) =

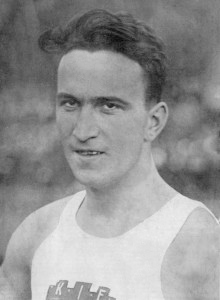

Personal information
- Nationality: Danish
- Born: 6 November 1910 Copenhagen, Denmark
- Died: 3 September 1958 (aged 47) Horsens, Denmark
- Education: University of Copenhagen

Sport
- Country: Denmark
- Sport: Athletics
- Event(s): Long jump, triple jump, high jump, sprint
- Club: KIF, Copenhagen
- Retired: 1937

Achievements and titles
- Personal best(s): LJ – 7.30 m (1931); TJ – 14.49 m (1931); HJ – 1.83 m (1929); 100 m – 11.2 (1932); 200 m – 23.0 (1930)

Willy Rasmussen (6 November 1910 – 3 September 1958) was a Danish athlete who competed in the long jump at the 1936 Summer Olympics. Between 1929 and 1937 he won 19 national titles and set nine national records in the long jump, high jump, triple jump, decathlon and sprint running. His last long jump record stood from 1931 to 1964.

Rasmussen was a lawyer and had two sons: Olle, also a lawyer, and Gert Mandrup, a sports doctor.
