= Wang Yuzeng =

Chinese basketball player

Personal information
- Nationality: Chinese
- Born: 10 April 1912; Gaobeidian, Republic of China
- Died: 7 October 2009 (aged 97); Hangzhou, China

Sport
- Sport: Basketball

Wang Yuzeng (10 April 1912 – 7 October 2009) was a Chinese basketball player. He competed in the men's tournament at the 1936 Summer Olympics.
