= Kenshi Togami =

Japanese athlete

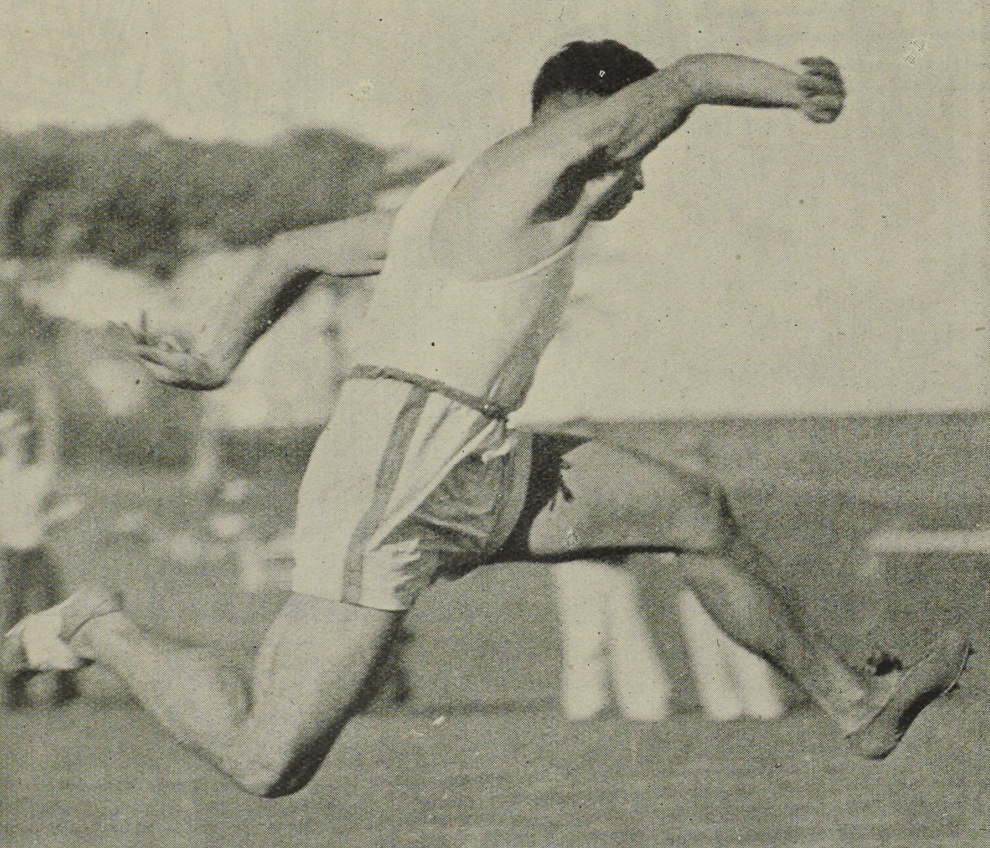
- Togami competing in the triple jump at the New Zealand track and field championships in 1937

Personal information
- Nationality: Japanese
- Born: 1 August 1912
- Died: 1986 (aged 73–74)

Sport
- Sport: Athletics
- Event: Long jump

Kenshi Togami (戸上 研之, Togami Kenshi; 1 August 1912 – 1986) was a Japanese athlete. He competed in the men's long jump at the 1936 Summer Olympics. His personal best in the long jump was 7.64 meters, achieved in 1938
