= Wilhelm Leichum =

German athletics competitor

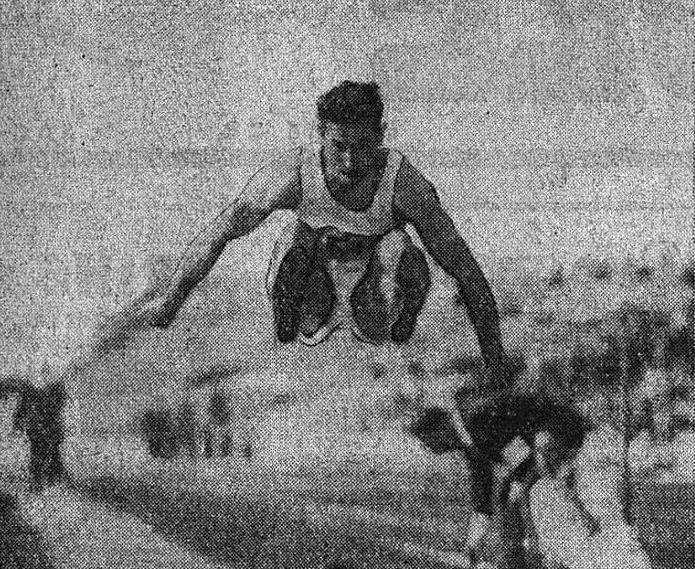
- Leichum in 1938

Personal information
- Born: 12 May 1911 Neu-Isenburg, Grand Duchy of Hesse
- Died: 19 July 1941 (aged 30) Gorky, Soviet Union
Medal record
Men's athletics
Representing Germany
Olympic Games
Bronze medal – third place	1936 Berlin	4 × 100 metre relay
European Championships
Gold medal – first place	1934 Turin	long jump
Gold medal – first place	1938 Paris	long jump

Wilhelm Leichum (12 May 1911, Neu-Isenburg, Grand Duchy of Hesse – 19 July 1941, Gorky) was a German athlete who competed mainly in the long jump and 100 metres.

Leichum was born in Hesse. He competed for Germany in the 1936 Summer Olympics held in Berlin, Germany in the 4 × 100 metre relay where he won the bronze medal with his teammates Erich Borchmeyer, Erwin Gillmeister and Gerd Hornberger. He was also 4th in the long jump. He was European Champion in the long jump both in 1934 and 1938.

He was killed in action during World War II in 1941, July 19.
