= Xu Zhaoxiong =

Chinese basketball player

Personal information
- Nationality: Chinese
- Born: 12 June 1912

Sport
- Sport: Basketball

Xu Zhaoxiong (born 12 June 1912, date of death unknown), also Hsu Chaohsung, was a Chinese basketball player. He competed in the men's tournament at the 1936 Summer Olympics.
