= Pedro del Vecchio =

Colombian athlete

Personal information
- Nationality: Colombian
- Born: 16 October 1912
- Died: 9 May 1960 (aged 47)

Sport
- Sport: Athletics
- Event: Triple jump

Pedro del Vecchio (16 October 1912 – 9 May 1960) was a Colombian athlete. He competed in the men's triple jump at the 1936 Summer Olympics.
