= Chang Chia-gwe =

Chinese long jumper

Personal information
- Nationality: Chinese
- Born: 23 May 1915

Sport
- Sport: Athletics
- Event: Long jump

Chang Chia-gwe (Chinese: 張家夔; pinyin: Zhāng Jiākuí; born 23 May 1915, date of death unknown) was a Chinese athlete. He competed in the men's long jump and the men's triple jump at the 1936 Summer Olympics. He was from Wuxi, Jiangsu, and in 1933 competed at the 3rd Jiangsu Provincial Athletics Competition in Zhenjiang, where he won gold in the men's long jump and triple jump with distances of 6.69 m and 13.05 m respectively.
