= Wang Nanzhen =

Chinese basketball player

Personal information
- Nationality: Chinese
- Born: 27 November 1911; Yixing, Qing dynasty
- Died: 1992 (aged 80–81)

Sport
- Sport: Basketball

Wang Nanzhen (27 November 1911 – 1992) was a Chinese basketball player. He competed in the men's tournament at the 1936 Summer Olympics.
