= Cai Yanxiong =

Chinese basketball player (1915–2007)

Personal information
- Nationality: Chinese
- Born: 26 August 1915; Bangkok, Siam
- Died: 29 June 2007 (aged 91); Hong Kong
- Height: 183 cm (6 ft 0 in)

Sport
- Sport: Basketball

Cai Yanxiong (26 August 1915 – 29 June 2007) was a Chinese basketball player. He competed in the men's tournament at the 1936 Summer Olympics.
