= Shen Yugong =

Chinese basketball player

Personal information
- Nationality: Chinese
- Born: 23 June 1918

Sport
- Sport: Basketball

Shen Yugong (born 23 June 1918, date of death unknown), also Shen Yikung, was a Chinese basketball player. He competed in the men's tournament at the 1936 Summer Olympics.
