= Naoto Tajima =

Japanese athlete (1912–1990)

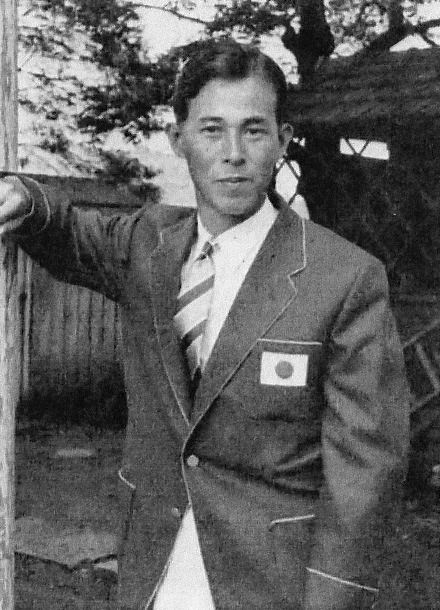
- Tajima in 1956

Personal information
- Born: August 15, 1912 Osaka Prefecture, Japan
- Died: December 4, 1990 (aged 78) Tokyo, Japan
- Height: 1.71 m (5 ft 7 in)
- Weight: 62 kg (137 lb)

Sport
- Sport: Athletics
- Event(s): Long jump, triple jump
Medal record
Representing Japan
Olympic Games
| Gold medal – first place | 1936 Berlin | Triple jump |
| Bronze medal – third place | 1936 Berlin | Long jump |

Naoto Tajima (田島 直人, Tajima Naoto; August 15, 1912 – December 4, 1990) was a Japanese athlete who competed at the 1932 and 1936 Olympics. In 1932 he finished sixth in the long jump, while in 1936 he finished third in the long jump, behind Jesse Owens and Luz Long, and won the triple jump event, setting a world record at 16.00 m. This record stood until 1951, when Adhemar da Silva improved it by one centimeter.

Raised in Iwakuni, Tajima graduated in economics from Kyoto Imperial University just prior to competing in the Olympics. His gold medal was Japan's last Olympic track and field gold medal until Naoko Takahashi won the women's marathon at the 2000 Summer Olympics.

Tajima retired from competitive athletics in 1938 but maintained an administrative role as managing director of the Japan Association of Athletics Federations. He was also a member of the Japanese Olympic Committee, coached the Japanese athletics teams at the 1956 and 1964 Olympics, and worked as a lecturer at Chukyo University.

== See also ==
- List of Olympic medalists in athletics (men)
- Long jump at the Olympics
- Triple jump at the Olympics

Records
| Preceded by Jack Metcalfe | Men's Triple Jump World Record Holder; 6 August 1936 – 3 December 1950 | Succeeded by Adhemar da Silva |
