= Jack Metcalfe =

Australian athlete

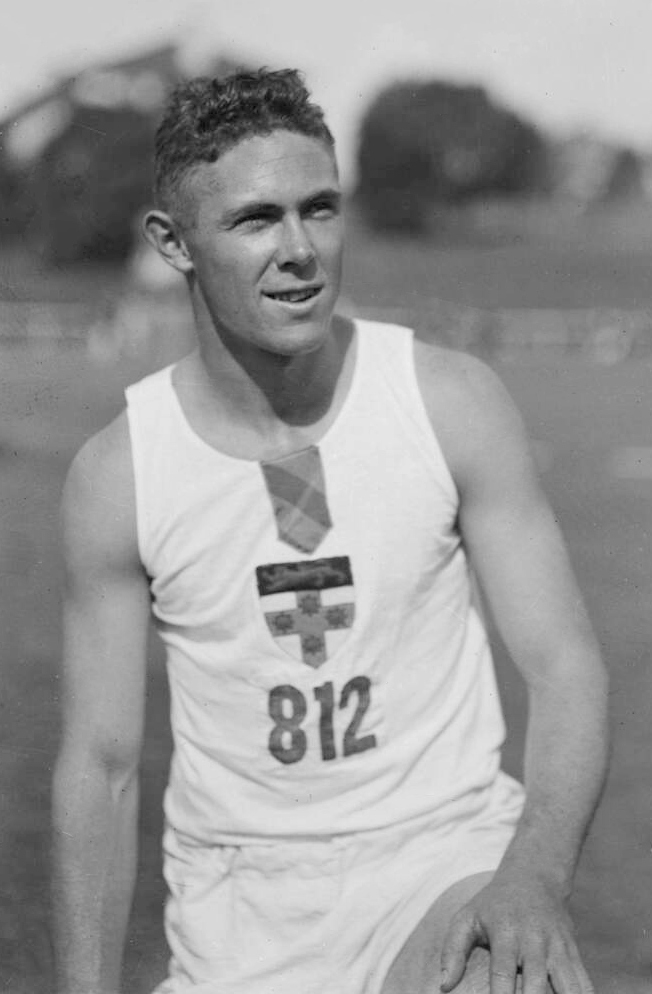
- Metcalfe in the 1930s

Personal information
- Born: John Patrick Metcalfe; 3 February 1912 Bellingen, New South Wales, Australia
- Died: 16 January 1994 (aged 81) Tura Beach, New South Wales, Australia
- Height: 183 cm (6 ft 0 in)
- Weight: 80 kg (176 lb)

Sport
- Sport: Athletics
- Events: High jump, triple jump, long jump, javelin, decathlon.

Achievements and titles
- Personal bests: HJ – 1.99 m (1934); TJ – 15.78 m (1935); LJ – 7.42 m (1938)
Medal record
Representing Australia
Olympic Games
Bronze medal – third place	1936 Berlin	Triple jump
British Empire Games
Gold medal – first place	1934 London	Triple jump
Bronze medal – third place	1934 London	Long jump
Gold medal – first place	1938 Sydney	Triple jump
Bronze medal – third place	1938 Sydney	Javelin

John Patrick Metcalfe (3 February 1912 – 16 January 1994) was an Australian athlete who competed in high jump, long jump and javelin events, though he is best remembered as a triple jumper.

== Biography ==
Metcalfe was educated at Sydney Boys High School and competed for Sydney University Athletics Club.

At the 1934 Empire Games, Metcalfe won the triple jump and took a bronze medal in the long jump. In the high jump event he finished fourth. Competing in Sydney on 14 December 1935, Metcalfe set a new world record in the triple jump, leaping 15.78 metres.

Metcalfe won two British AAA Championships titles in the high jump and triple jump events at the 1936 AAA Championships. One month later he was selected to represent Australia at the 1936 Olympic Games held in Berlin.

At the Games he won the bronze medal in the men's triple jump event. The winner Naoto Tajima of Japan broke the Australian's world record during the competition. It was later reported that Metcalfe, who was self-coached, assisted the Japanese athletes during the competition and that German officials had complained about this. Metcalfe also participated in the high jump competition and finished twelfth.

Metcalfe's bronze was the only medal won by the entire Australian team at this Olympic Games. At his final international competition – the 1938 British Empire Games in his home-town of Sydney – Metcalfe defended his triple jump gold medal and also took bronze in the javelin. In the long jump event he finished fifth and in the high jump competition he finished seventh.

Records
Preceded by (Japan) Chūhei Nambu	Men's triple jump world record holder 1935-12-14 – 1936-08-06	Succeeded by (Japan) Naoto Tajima
