= Heinz Wöllner =

German triple jumper

Personal information
- Nationality: German
- Born: 25 July 1913 Leipzig, German Empire
- Died: 19 April 1945 (aged 31) Hagen, Germany

Sport
- Sport: Athletics
- Event: Triple jump

Heinz Wöllner (25 July 1913 – 19 April 1945) was a German athlete. He competed in the men's triple jump at the 1936 Summer Olympics. He was killed in action during World War II.
