= Situ Guong =

Chinese athlete

Personal information
- Nationality: Chinese
- Born: 26 September 1911

Sport
- Sport: Athletics
- Events: Long jump Triple jump

Situ Guong (born 26 September 1911, date of death unknown) was a Chinese athlete. He competed in the men's long jump and the men's triple jump at the 1936 Summer Olympics.
