= Li Shaotang =

Chinese basketball player

Personal information
- Nationality: Chinese
- Born: 30 June 1914

Sport
- Sport: Basketball

Li Shaotang (born 30 June 1914, date of death unknown) was a Chinese basketball player. He competed in the men's tournament at the 1936 Summer Olympics.
