= Erich Joch =

German triple jumper

Personal information
- Nationality: German
- Born: 17 February 1913
- Died: 9 March 2003 (aged 90)

Sport
- Sport: Athletics
- Event: Triple jump

Erich Joch (17 February 1913 – 9 March 2003) was a German athlete. He competed in the men's triple jump at the 1936 Summer Olympics.
