= Masao Harada =

Japanese triple jumper (1912–2000)

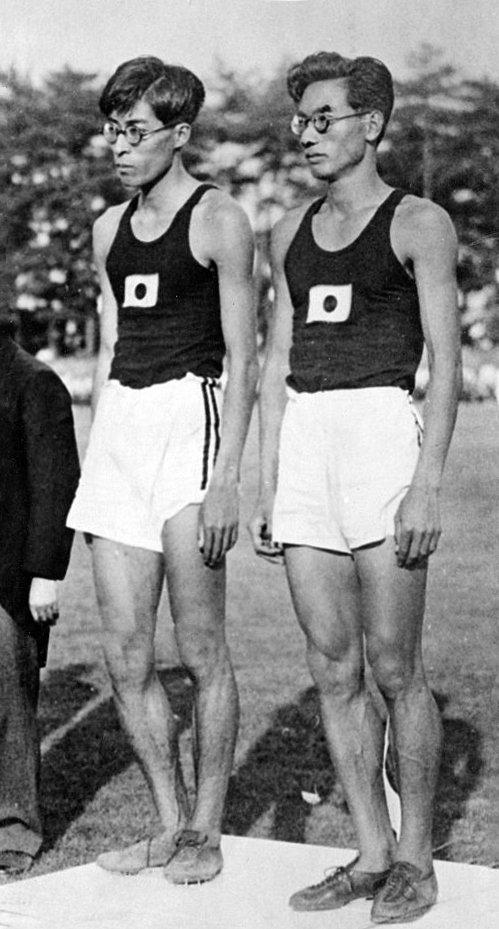
- Harada (left) and Kenkichi Oshima in 1934

Personal information
- Born: September 22, 1912 Kyoto, Japan
- Died: January 22, 2000 (aged 87) Yokohama, Japan
- Height: 1.77 m (5 ft 10 in)
- Weight: 60 kg (130 lb)

Sport
- Country: Japan
- Sport: Men's athletics
- Event: Triple jump
Medal record
Olympic Games
Silver medal – second place	1936 Berlin	Triple jump

Masao Harada (原田 正夫, Harada Masao; September 22, 1912 – January 22, 2000) was a Japanese athlete who competed mainly in the triple jump. In this event he won a silver medal at the 1936 Olympics. He won two more silver medals, in the long jump and triple jump, at the 1934 Far Eastern Championship Games.
