= Hoh Chunde =

Chinese athlete

Personal information
- Nationality: Chinese
- Born: 4 May 1909

Sport
- Sport: Athletics
- Events: Long jump Javelin throw

Hoh Chunde (born 4 May 1909, date of death unknown) was a Chinese athlete. He competed in the men's long jump and the men's javelin throw at the 1936 Summer Olympics.
