= Virgilio Tommasi =

Italian long jumper

Personal information
- Nationality: Italian
- Born: 10 May 1905 Verona, Italy
- Died: 21 February 1998 (aged 92) Rome, Italy
- Height: 180 cm (5 ft 11 in)
- Weight: 70 kg (154 lb)

Sport
- Country: Italy
- Sport: Athletics
- Event: Long jump
- Club: Bentegodi Verona
Medal record
Summer Student World Championships
Gold medal – first place	1927 Rome	Long jump

Virgilio Tommasi (10 May 1905 - 20 February 1998) was an Italian long jumper who competed at the 1924 Summer Olympics.

== Biography ==
Tommasi was the brother of Olympic high jumper athlete, Angelo Tommasi.

Virgilio won six long jump Italian national championships at senior level in 1924, 1925, 1926, 1928, 1929 and 1931.

Tommasi finished third behind Richard Honner in the long jump event at the British 1926 AAA Championships.

== See also ==
- Men's long jump Italian record progression
