= Artur Bäumle =

German long jumper (1906–1943)

Personal information
- Full name: Albert Arthur Bäumle
- Nationality: German
- Born: 4 September 1906 Lörrach, Germany
- Died: 6 January 1943 (aged 36) Stalingrad, Soviet Union

Sport
- Sport: Athletics
- Event: Long jump

Achievements and titles
- Olympic finals: 1936 Summer Olympics

Artur Bäumle (4 September 1906 – 6 January 1943) was a German athlete. He competed in the men's long jump at the 1936 Summer Olympics. He was killed in action during World War II.
