= Wang Shixuan =

Chinese basketball player

Personal information
- Nationality: Chinese
- Born: 20 March 1912
- Died: 11 November 1983

Sport
- Sport: Basketball

Wang Shixuan (王士選, 20 March 1912 – 11 November 1983) was a Chinese basketball player. He competed in the men's tournament at the 1936 Summer Olympics.
