= Chūhei Nambu =

Japanese long and triple jumper

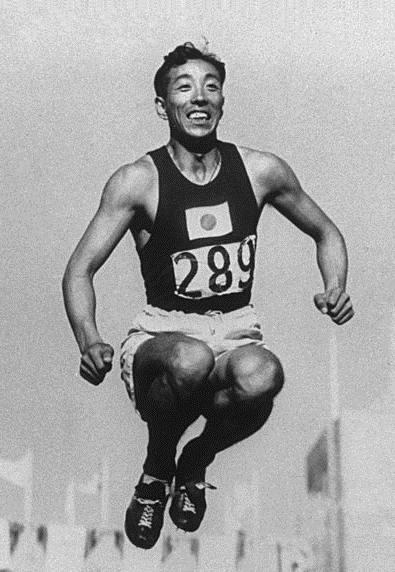
- Chūhei Nambu at the 1932 Olympics

Personal information
- Born: May 27, 1904 Sapporo, Hokkaido, Japan
- Died: July 23, 1997 (aged 93) Suita, Osaka, Japan
- Height: 1.70 m (5 ft 7 in)
- Weight: 67 kg (148 lb)

Sport
- Country: Japan
- Sport: Athletics
- Event(s): 100 m, long jump, triple jump

Achievements and titles
- Personal best(s): 100 m – 10.5 (1933); LJ – 7.98 (1931); TJ – 15.72 (1932)
Medal record
Olympic Games
Gold medal – first place	1932 Los Angeles	Triple jump
Bronze medal – third place	1932 Los Angeles	Long jump

Chūhei Nambu (南部 忠平, Nanbu Chūhei; May 27, 1904 – July 23, 1997) was a Japanese track and field athlete. As of 2024, he is the only person to have held world records in both the long jump and the triple jump.

== Biography ==
The first results known for Nambu are from the mid-1920s. He was a member of the Japanese Olympic team at the 1928 Summer Olympics in Amsterdam, where he competed in three events. His best performance came in the triple jump, where he placed fourth, while his countryman Mikio Oda won the gold. In the long jump, he finished ninth, and his 4 × 100 m relay team was eliminated in the heats.

Nambu's real breakthrough came in 1931. After improving his Japanese record a few times, he landed a long jump just two cm short of 8 m, a new world record. Jesse Owens broke the world record less than four years later but it stood as an Asian record until it was beaten by Hiroomi Yamada in 1970.

The next year, at the Los Angeles Games, he was one of the favourites for the Olympic titles in both horizontal jumps. Nambu was disappointed with his third place in the long jump, but took revenge in the triple jump final, held a few days after the long jump. His winning mark of 15.72 m set a new world record. Thereby, Nambu became the first athlete to hold the world record in both horizontal jumps. He retained both records until 1935, when he lost them to Jesse Owens (long jump) and Jack Metcalfe (triple jump).

Nambu was also a strong sprinter. He won the 100 m race at the 1930 and 1933 Japanese Championships and set a Japanese record at 10.6 seconds in 1931.

After retiring from competitions Nambu became a sports journalist for Mainichi Shimbun. He also remained active in sports, being head coach for the Japanese Athletics Association, and acting as manager of the national team at the 1964 Tokyo Olympics. In 1992, he was awarded the Olympic Order in silver by the International Olympic Committee (IOC). He died of pneumonia aged 93.

Records
Preceded by Mikio Oda	Men's Triple Jump World Record Holder; 1932-08-14 – 1935-12-14	Succeeded by Jack Metcalfe
