= Sidney Bowman =

American triple jumper (1907–1986)

Personal information
- Nationality: American
- Born: June 8, 1907
- Died: April 29, 1986 (aged 78)

Sport
- Sport: Athletics
- Event: Triple jump

Sidney Bowman (June 8, 1907 – April 29, 1986) was an American athlete. He competed in the men's triple jump at the 1928 Summer Olympics and the 1932 Summer Olympics.
