= François Mersch =

Luxembourgish sprinter

Personal information
- Nationality: Luxembourgish
- Born: 9 June 1913 Luxembourg City, Luxembourg
- Died: 15 February 1983 (aged 69) Luxembourg City, Luxembourg
- Height: 180 cm (5 ft 11 in)
- Weight: 73 kg (161 lb)

Sport
- Sport: Sprinting
- Event: 100 metres

François Mersch (9 June 1913 – 15 February 1983) was a Luxembourgish sprinter who competed at the 1936 Summer Olympics.

== Biography ==
At the 1936 Olympic Games in Berlin, Mersch competed in the men's 100 metres competition.

Mersch finished second behind Arturo Maffei in the long jump event at the 1938 AAA Championships. Shortly afterwards in September, at the 1938 European Athletics Championships he competed in the long jump finishing 9th in the final.
