= Francesco Tabai =

Italian athletics competitor

Personal information
- Nationality: Italian
- Born: 22 February 1908 Gorizia, Italy
- Died: 3 September 1984 (aged 76)

Sport
- Sport: Athletics
- Event(s): Long jump Triple jump Decathlon

Francesco Tabai (22 February 1908 – 3 September 1984) was an Italian male long, triple jumper and decathlete who competed at the 1932 Summer Olympics.

== National titles ==
He won five national championships at the individual senior level.

- Italian Athletics Championships
  - Long jump: 1933, 1934
  - triple jump: 1936, 1937
  - Decathlon: 1931
