= Otto Berg (athlete) =

Norwegian long jumper

Medal record

Men's athletics

Representing Norway

European Championships
Silver medal – second place	1934 Turin	Long jump

Otto Berg (24 August 1906 in Bolsøy, Molde – 10 April 1991) was a Norwegian long jumper.

At the 1936 Summer Olympics he finished tenth in the long jump final with a jump of 7.30 metres. He won the silver medal at the 1934 European Championships in Athletics. He became Norwegian champion in long jump in 1931 and 1934–1936.

His personal best jump was 7.53 metres, achieved in August 1934 on Bislett stadion.

In 1934 he won the Egebergs Ærespris.

Preceded by Fritjof Bergheim	Egebergs Ærespris; 1934	Succeeded by Bjarne Bryntesen
