= Lennart Andersson (athlete) =

Swedish triple jumper

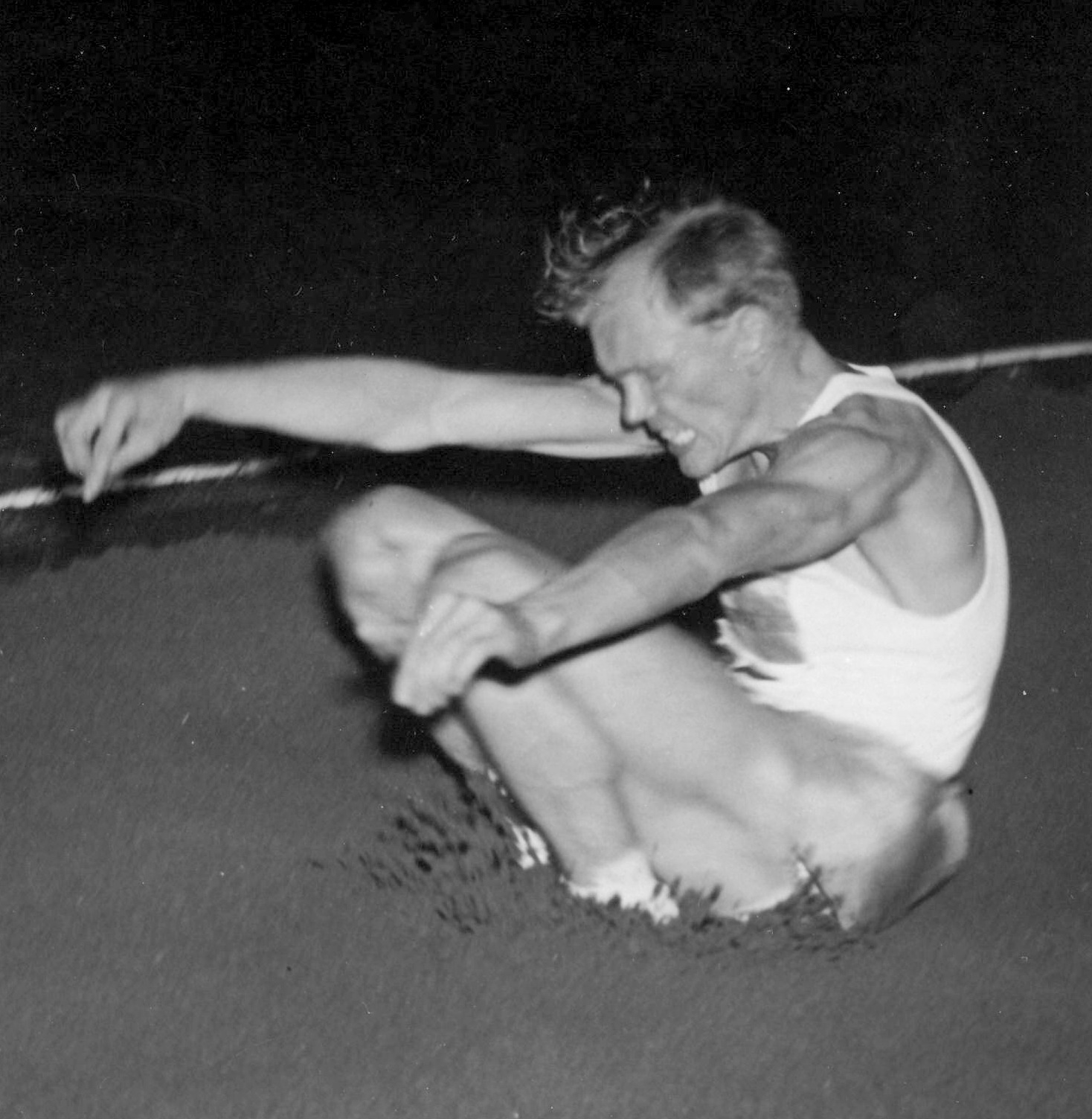

Personal information
- Born: 17 January 1914 Lund, Sweden
- Died: 18 December 1997 (aged 83) Gothenburg, Sweden
- Height: 1.79 m (5 ft 10 in)
- Weight: 69 kg (152 lb)

Sport
- Sport: Athletics
- Event: Triple jump
- Club: Malmö AI

Achievements and titles
- Personal best: 14.93 m (1939)

Agne Lennart Andersson (later Agnred, 17 January 1914 – 18 December 1997) was a Swedish triple jumper. He competed at the 1936 Summer Olympics and 1938 European Athletics Championships and finished in 19th and 6th place, respectively.

Andersson held national titles in the triple jump in 1937–38 and in the standing high jump in 1937.
