= Jean Studer =

Swiss athletics competitor

Personal information
- Nationality: Swiss
- Born: 12 September 1914
- Died: 23 February 2009 (aged 94)

Sport
- Sport: Athletics
- Event: Long jump

Jean Studer (12 September 1914 – 23 February 2009) was a Swiss athlete. He competed in the men's long jump at the 1936 Summer Olympics and the 1948 Summer Olympics.
