= Triple jump at the Olympics =

Triple jump at the Olympic Games
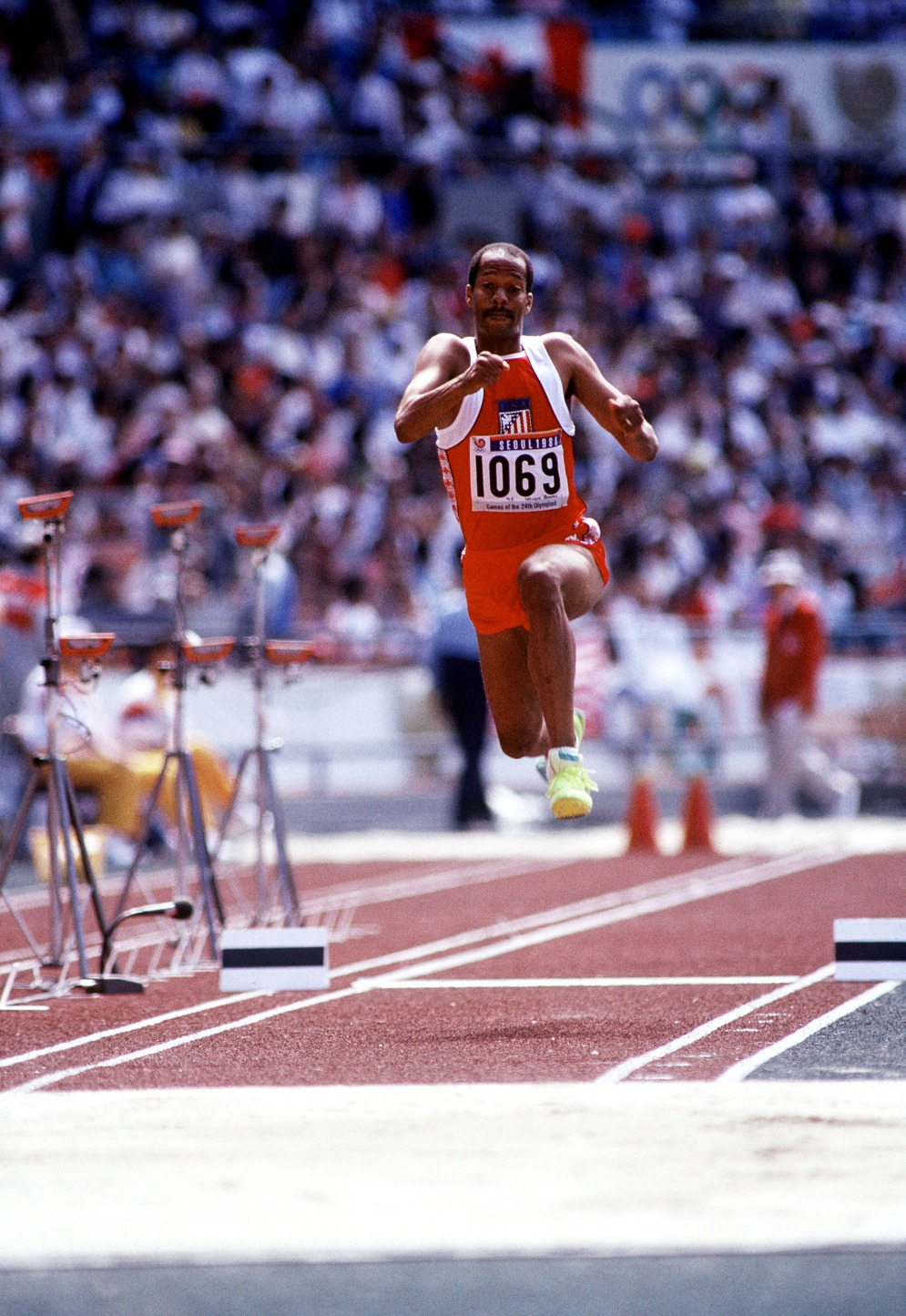
- Willie Banks in the 1988 Olympic triple jump competition

Overview
- Sport: Athletics
- Gender: Men and women
- Years held: Men: 1896–2024; Women: 1996–2024

Olympic record
- Men: 18.09 m Kenny Harrison (1996)
- Women: 15.67 m Yulimar Rojas (2021)

Reigning champion
- Men: Jordan Díaz (ESP)
- Women: Thea LaFond (DMA)

The triple jump at the Summer Olympics is grouped among the four track and field jumping events held at the multi-sport event. The men's triple jump has been present on the Olympic athletics programme since the first Summer Olympics in 1896. The women's triple jump is one of the more recent additions to the programme, having been first contested in 1996. It became the third Olympic jumping event for women after the high jump and long jump.

The Olympic records for the event are 18.09 m (59 ft 4 in) for men, set by Kenny Harrison in 1996, and 15.67 m (51 ft 4 3/4 in) for women, set by Yulimar Rojas in 2021. The men's triple jump world record was broken at the competition in 1924, 1932, 1936, 1956 and 1968. At the 1968 Summer Olympics, three men improved the record a total of five times at the high altitude of Mexico City. The women's world record was broken at the Olympics in Tokyo in 2021.

James Brendan Connolly was the first Olympic triple jump champion and, as it was the first event to conclude in 1896, he was also the first Olympic champion of the modern era. Inessa Kravets, the world record holder, became the first women's champion 100 years later at the Atlanta Games. Portuguese Pedro Pichardo and Venezuelan Yulimar Rojas are the reigning Olympic champions from 2020.

Viktor Saneyev is the event's most successful athlete as he was Olympic champion three times consecutively from 1968 to 1976, as well as runner-up in 1980. Françoise Mbango Etone is the only woman to win two Olympic triple jump titles. Saneyev, Vilho Tuulos and Olga Rypakova are the only three athletes to have won more than two Olympic medals in the event. The United States is the most successful nation in the event, with eight gold medals. The Soviet Union is the next most successful, with four golds.

A short-lived standing triple jump variant of the event was contested in 1900 and 1904 and standing jumps specialist Ray Ewry won both gold medals.

== Medalists ==
=== Men ===
| Games | Gold | Silver | Bronze |
|---|---|---|---|
| 1896 Athens | James Brendan Connolly; United States | Alexandre Tuffère; France | Ioannis Persakis; Greece |
| 1900 Paris | Myer Prinstein; United States | James Brendan Connolly; United States | Lewis Sheldon; United States |
| 1904 St. Louis | Myer Prinstein; United States | Fred Englehardt; United States | Robert Stangland; United States |
| 1908 London | Tim Ahearne; Great Britain | Garfield MacDonald; Canada | Edvard Larsen; Norway |
| 1912 Stockholm | Gustaf Lindblom; Sweden | Georg Åberg; Sweden | Erik Almlöf; Sweden |
| 1920 Antwerp | Vilho Tuulos; Finland | Folke Jansson; Sweden | Erik Almlöf; Sweden |
| 1924 Paris | Nick Winter; Australia | Luis Brunetto; Argentina | Vilho Tuulos; Finland |
| 1928 Amsterdam | Mikio Oda; Japan | Levi Casey; United States | Vilho Tuulos; Finland |
| 1932 Los Angeles | Chūhei Nambu; Japan | Erik Svensson; Sweden | Kenkichi Oshima; Japan |
| 1936 Berlin | Naoto Tajima; Japan | Masao Harada; Japan | Jack Metcalfe; Australia |
| 1948 London | Arne Åhman; Sweden | George Avery; Australia | Ruhi Sarıalp; Turkey |
| 1952 Helsinki | Adhemar da Silva; Brazil | Leonid Shcherbakov; Soviet Union | Asnoldo Devonish; Venezuela |
| 1956 Melbourne | Adhemar da Silva; Brazil | Vilhjálmur Einarsson; Iceland | Vitold Kreyer; Soviet Union |
| 1960 Rome | Józef Szmidt; Poland | Vladimir Goryaev; Soviet Union | Vitold Kreyer; Soviet Union |
| 1964 Tokyo | Józef Szmidt; Poland | Oleg Fedoseyev; Soviet Union | Viktor Kravchenko; Soviet Union |
| 1968 Mexico City | Viktor Saneyev; Soviet Union | Nelson Prudêncio; Brazil | Giuseppe Gentile; Italy |
| 1972 Munich | Viktor Saneyev; Soviet Union | Jörg Drehmel; East Germany | Nelson Prudêncio; Brazil |
| 1976 Montreal | Viktor Saneyev; Soviet Union | James Butts; United States | João Carlos de Oliveira; Brazil |
| 1980 Moscow | Jaak Uudmäe; Soviet Union | Viktor Saneyev; Soviet Union | João Carlos de Oliveira; Brazil |
| 1984 Los Angeles | Al Joyner; United States | Mike Conley; United States | Keith Connor; Great Britain |
| 1988 Seoul | Khristo Markov; Bulgaria | Igor Lapshin; Soviet Union | Aleksandr Kovalenko; Soviet Union |
| 1992 Barcelona | Mike Conley; United States | Charles Simpkins; United States | Frank Rutherford; Bahamas |
| 1996 Atlanta | Kenny Harrison; United States | Jonathan Edwards; Great Britain | Yoelbi Quesada; Cuba |
| 2000 Sydney | Jonathan Edwards; Great Britain | Yoel García; Cuba | Denis Kapustin; Russia |
| 2004 Athens | Christian Olsson; Sweden | Marian Oprea; Romania | Danil Burkenya; Russia |
| 2008 Beijing | Nelson Évora; Portugal | Phillips Idowu; Great Britain | Leevan Sands; Bahamas |
| 2012 London | Christian Taylor; United States | Will Claye; United States | Fabrizio Donato; Italy |
| 2016 Rio de Janeiro | Christian Taylor; United States | Will Claye; United States | Dong Bin; China |
| 2020 Tokyo | Pedro Pichardo; Portugal | Zhu Yaming; China | Hugues Fabrice Zango; Burkina Faso |
| 2024 Paris | Jordan Díaz; Spain | Pedro Pichardo; Portugal | Andy Díaz; Italy |

==== Multiple medalists ====
| Rank | Athlete | Nation | Olympics | Gold | Silver | Bronze | Total |
|---|---|---|---|---|---|---|---|
| 1 | Viktor Saneyev | Soviet Union | 1968–1980 | 3 | 1 | 0 | 4 |
| 2 | Myer Prinstein | United States | 1900–1904 | 2 | 0 | 0 | 2 |
| 2 | Adhemar da Silva | Brazil | 1952–1956 | 2 | 0 | 0 | 2 |
| 2 | Józef Szmidt | Poland | 1960–1964 | 2 | 0 | 0 | 2 |
| 2 | Christian Taylor | United States | 2012–2016 | 2 | 0 | 0 | 2 |
| 6 | James Brendan Connolly | United States | 1896–1900 | 1 | 1 | 0 | 2 |
| 6 | Mike Conley, Sr. | United States | 1984–1992 | 1 | 1 | 0 | 2 |
| 6 | Jonathan Edwards | Great Britain | 1996–2000 | 1 | 1 | 0 | 2 |
| 6 | Pedro Pichardo | Portugal | 2020–2024 | 1 | 1 | 0 | 2 |
| 10 | Vilho Tuulos | Finland | 1920–1928 | 1 | 0 | 2 | 3 |
| 11 | Will Claye | United States | 2012–2016 | 0 | 2 | 0 | 2 |
| 12 | Nelson Prudencio | Brazil | 1968–1972 | 0 | 1 | 1 | 2 |
| 13 | Erik Almlöf | Sweden | 1912–1920 | 0 | 0 | 2 | 2 |
| 13 | Vitold Kreyer | Soviet Union | 1956–1960 | 0 | 0 | 2 | 2 |
| 13 | João Carlos de Oliveira | Brazil | 1976–1980 | 0 | 0 | 2 | 2 |

==== Medalists by country ====
| Rank | Nation | Gold | Silver | Bronze | Total |
|---|---|---|---|---|---|
| 1 | United States | 8 | 8 | 2 | 18 |
| 2 | Soviet Union | 4 | 5 | 4 | 13 |
| 3 | Sweden | 3 | 3 | 2 | 8 |
| 4 | Japan | 3 | 1 | 1 | 5 |
| 5 | Great Britain | 2 | 2 | 1 | 5 |
| 6 | Brazil | 2 | 1 | 3 | 6 |
| 7 | Portugal | 2 | 1 | 0 | 3 |
| 8 | Poland | 2 | 0 | 0 | 2 |
| 9 | Australia | 1 | 1 | 1 | 3 |
| 10 | Finland | 1 | 0 | 2 | 3 |
| 11 | Bulgaria | 1 | 0 | 0 | 1 |
| 11 | Spain | 1 | 0 | 0 | 1 |
| 13 | China | 0 | 1 | 1 | 2 |
| 13 | Cuba | 0 | 1 | 1 | 2 |
| 15 | Argentina | 0 | 1 | 0 | 1 |
| 15 | Canada | 0 | 1 | 0 | 1 |
| 15 | East Germany | 0 | 1 | 0 | 1 |
| 15 | France | 0 | 1 | 0 | 1 |
| 15 | Iceland | 0 | 1 | 0 | 1 |
| 15 | Romania | 0 | 1 | 0 | 1 |
| 21 | Italy | 0 | 0 | 3 | 3 |
| 22 | Bahamas | 0 | 0 | 2 | 2 |
| 22 | Russia | 0 | 0 | 2 | 2 |
| 24 | Burkina Faso | 0 | 0 | 1 | 1 |
| 24 | Greece | 0 | 0 | 1 | 1 |
| 24 | Norway | 0 | 0 | 1 | 1 |
| 24 | Turkey | 0 | 0 | 1 | 1 |
| 24 | Venezuela | 0 | 0 | 1 | 1 |

=== Women ===
| Games | Gold | Silver | Bronze |
|---|---|---|---|
| 1996 Atlanta | Inessa Kravets; Ukraine | Inna Lasovskaya; Russia | Šárka Kašpárková; Czech Republic |
| 2000 Sydney | Tereza Marinova; Bulgaria | Tatyana Lebedeva; Russia | Olena Hovorova; Ukraine |
| 2004 Athens | Françoise Mbango Etone; Cameroon | Hrysopiyí Devetzí; Greece | Tatyana Lebedeva; Russia |
| 2008 Beijing | Françoise Mbango Etone; Cameroon | Olga Rypakova; Kazakhstan | Yargelis Savigne; Cuba |
| 2012 London | Olga Rypakova; Kazakhstan | Caterine Ibargüen; Colombia | Olha Saladukha; Ukraine |
| 2016 Rio de Janeiro | Caterine Ibargüen; Colombia | Yulimar Rojas; Venezuela | Olga Rypakova; Kazakhstan |
| 2020 Tokyo | Yulimar Rojas; Venezuela | Patrícia Mamona; Portugal | Ana Peleteiro; Spain |
| 2024 Paris | Thea LaFond; Dominica | Shanieka Ricketts; Jamaica | Jasmine Moore; United States |

==== Multiple medalists ====
| Rank | Athlete | Nation | Olympics | Gold | Silver | Bronze | Total |
|---|---|---|---|---|---|---|---|
| 1 | Françoise Mbango Etone | Cameroon | 2004–2008 | 2 | 0 | 0 | 2 |
| 2 | Olga Rypakova | Kazakhstan | 2008–2016 | 1 | 1 | 1 | 3 |
| 3 | Caterine Ibargüen | Colombia | 2012–2016 | 1 | 1 | 0 | 2 |
| 4 | Yulimar Rojas | Venezuela | 2016–2020 | 1 | 1 | 0 | 2 |
| 5 | Tatyana Lebedeva | Russia | 2000–2008 | 0 | 1 | 1 | 2 |

==== Medalists by country ====
| Rank | Nation | Gold | Silver | Bronze | Total |
|---|---|---|---|---|---|
| 1 | Cameroon | 2 | 0 | 0 | 2 |
| 2 | Kazakhstan | 1 | 1 | 1 | 3 |
| 3 | Colombia | 1 | 1 | 0 | 2 |
| 3 | Venezuela | 1 | 1 | 0 | 2 |
| 5 | Ukraine | 1 | 0 | 2 | 3 |
| 6 | Bulgaria | 1 | 0 | 0 | 1 |
| 6 | Dominica | 1 | 0 | 0 | 1 |
| 8 | Russia | 0 | 2 | 1 | 3 |
| 9 | Greece | 0 | 1 | 0 | 1 |
| 9 | Jamaica | 0 | 1 | 0 | 1 |
| 9 | Portugal | 0 | 1 | 0 | 1 |
| 12 | Czech Republic | 0 | 0 | 1 | 1 |
| 12 | Cuba | 0 | 0 | 1 | 1 |
| 12 | Spain | 0 | 0 | 1 | 1 |
| 12 | United States | 0 | 0 | 1 | 1 |

== Standing triple jump ==
Standing triple jump at the Olympic Games
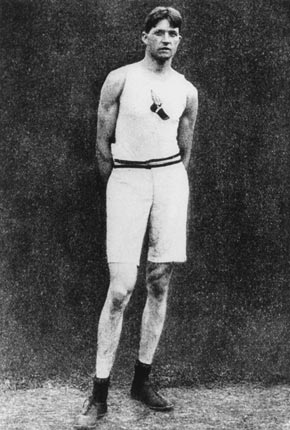
- Ray Ewry at the 1900 Summer Olympics

Overview
- Sport: Athletics
- Gender: Men
- Years held: Men: 1900–1904

Olympic record
- Men: 10.58 m Ray Ewry (1900)

In 1900 and 1904 a variation of the event was contested at the Olympics where athletes had to triple jump from a standing position. This was one of three standing jumps to have featured on the Olympic programme, alongside the standing high jump and the standing long jump (both running from 1900 to 1912).

The standing jump competitions were dominated by Ray Ewry, who won the 1900 Olympic standing triple jump title and defended it four years later. His clearance of 10.58 m (34 ft 8 1/2 in) to win the inaugural competition went unbettered as the Olympic record for the event. Ewry took Olympic three gold medals in standing jumps in both 1900 and 1904, then won the standing high and long jumps at the 1908 Olympics, as well as the 1906 Intercalated Games.

Standing jump events had been a relatively common type of athletics event at the end of the 19th century, but became increasingly rare at top level national and international competitions as the 20th century progressed. The standing triple jump was the least common of the standing jumps and the Olympics remains the only major international competition to have featured the event.

| Games | Gold | Silver | Bronze |
|---|---|---|---|
| 1900 Paris | Ray Ewry (USA) | Irving Baxter (USA) | Robert Garrett (USA) |
| 1904 St. Louis | Ray Ewry (USA) | Charles King (USA) | Joseph Stadler (USA) |
