= High jump at the Olympics =

High jump at the Olympic Games
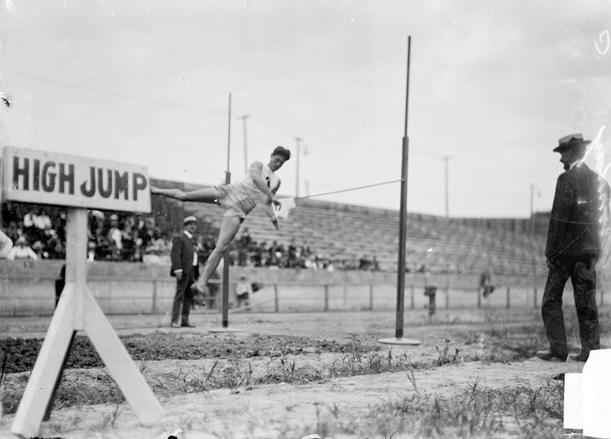
- The 1904 high jump competition

Overview
- Sport: Athletics
- Gender: Men and women
- Years held: Men: 1896–2024; Women: 1928–2024

Olympic record
- Men: 2.39 m Charles Austin (1996)
- Women: 2.06 m Yelena Slesarenko (2004)

Reigning champion
- Men: Hamish Kerr (NZL)
- Women: Yaroslava Mahuchikh (UKR)

The high jump at the Summer Olympics is grouped among the four track and field jumping events held at the multi-sport event. The men's high jump has been present on the Olympic athletics programme since the first Summer Olympics in 1896. The women's high jump was one of five events to feature on the first women's athletics programme in 1928, and it was the only jumping event available to women until 1948, when the long jump was permitted.

The Olympic records for the event are 2.39 m (7 ft 10 in) for men, set by Charles Austin in 1996, and 2.06 m (6 ft 9 in) for women, set by Yelena Slesarenko in 2004. Gerd Wessig is the only man to have set a world record in the Olympic high jump, having done so in 1980 with a mark of 2.36 m (7 ft 8 3/4 in). The women's world record has been broken on three occasions at the Olympics, with records coming in 1928, 1932 and 1972.

Ellery Clark was the first Olympic champion in 1896 and Ethel Catherwood became the first female Olympic high jump champion 32 years later. Following the 2024 Olympics, Hamish Kerr of New Zealand is the reigning men's Olympic champion and Yaroslava Mahuchikh from Ukraine is the reigning women's Olympic champion. Only two athletes have won two Olympic high jump titles, both women: Iolanda Balaș and Ulrike Meyfarth.

A standing high jump variant of the event was contested from 1900 to 1912 and standing jumps specialist Ray Ewry won all but one of the gold medals in its brief history.

== Medalists ==
=== Men ===
Games	Gold	Silver	Bronze
1896 Athens	Ellery Harding Clark; United States	James Brendan Connolly; United States	none awarded
1896 Athens	Ellery Harding Clark; United States	Robert Garrett; United States	none awarded
1900 Paris	Irving Baxter; United States	Patrick Leahy; Great Britain	Lajos Gönczy; Hungary
1904 St. Louis	Samuel Jones; United States	Garrett Serviss; United States	Paul Weinstein; Germany
1908 London	Harry Porter; United States	Géo André; France	none awarded
1908 London	Harry Porter; United States	Con Leahy; Great Britain	none awarded
1908 London	Harry Porter; United States	István Somodi; Hungary	none awarded
1912 Stockholm	Alma Richards; United States	Hans Liesche; Germany	George Horine; United States
1920 Antwerp	Richmond Landon; United States	Harold Muller; United States	Bo Ekelund; Sweden
1924 Paris	Harold Osborn; United States	Leroy Brown; United States	Pierre Lewden; France
1928 Amsterdam	Bob King; United States	Benjamin Hedges; United States	Claude Ménard; France
1932 Los Angeles	Duncan McNaughton; Canada	Bob Van Osdel; United States	Simeon Toribio; Philippines
1936 Berlin	Cornelius Johnson; United States	Dave Albritton; United States	Delos Thurber; United States
1948 London	John Winter; Australia	Bjørn Paulson; Norway	George Stanich; United States
1952 Helsinki	Walt Davis; United States	Ken Wiesner; United States	José da Conceição; Brazil
1956 Melbourne	Charles Dumas; United States	Chilla Porter; Australia	Igor Kashkarov; Soviet Union
1960 Rome	Robert Shavlakadze; Soviet Union	Valeriy Brumel; Soviet Union	John Thomas; United States
1964 Tokyo	Valeriy Brumel; Soviet Union	John Thomas; United States	John Rambo; United States
1968 Mexico City	Dick Fosbury; United States	Ed Caruthers; United States	Valentin Gavrilov; Soviet Union
1972 Munich	Jüri Tarmak; Soviet Union	Stefan Junge; East Germany	Dwight Stones; United States
1976 Montreal	Jacek Wszoła; Poland	Greg Joy; Canada	Dwight Stones; United States
1980 Moscow	Gerd Wessig; East Germany	Jacek Wszoła; Poland	Jörg Freimuth; East Germany
1984 Los Angeles	Dietmar Mögenburg; West Germany	Patrik Sjöberg; Sweden	Zhu Jianhua; China
1988 Seoul	Hennadiy Avdyeyenko; Soviet Union	Hollis Conway; United States	Rudolf Povarnitsyn; Soviet Union
1988 Seoul	Hennadiy Avdyeyenko; Soviet Union	Hollis Conway; United States	Patrik Sjöberg; Sweden
1992 Barcelona	Javier Sotomayor; Cuba	Patrik Sjöberg; Sweden	Hollis Conway; United States
1992 Barcelona	Javier Sotomayor; Cuba	Patrik Sjöberg; Sweden	Tim Forsyth; Australia
1992 Barcelona	Javier Sotomayor; Cuba	Patrik Sjöberg; Sweden	Artur Partyka; Poland
1996 Atlanta	Charles Austin; United States	Artur Partyka; Poland	Steve Smith; Great Britain
2000 Sydney	Sergey Klyugin; Russia	Javier Sotomayor; Cuba	Abderahmane Hammad; Algeria
2004 Athens	Stefan Holm; Sweden	Matt Hemingway; United States	Jaroslav Bába; Czech Republic
2008 Beijing	Andrey Silnov; Russia	Germaine Mason; Great Britain	Yaroslav Rybakov; Russia
2012 London	Erik Kynard; United States	Mutaz Essa Barshim; Qatar	none awarded
2012 London	Erik Kynard; United States	Derek Drouin; Canada	none awarded
2012 London	Erik Kynard; United States	Robbie Grabarz; Great Britain	none awarded
2016 Rio de Janeiro	Derek Drouin; Canada	Mutaz Essa Barshim; Qatar	Bohdan Bondarenko; Ukraine
2020 Tokyo	Gianmarco Tamberi; Italy	none awarded	Maksim Nedasekau; Belarus
2020 Tokyo	Mutaz Essa Barshim; Qatar	none awarded	Maksim Nedasekau; Belarus
2024 Paris	Hamish Kerr; New Zealand	Shelby McEwen; United States	Mutaz Essa Barshim; Qatar

==== Multiple medalists ====
Rank	Athlete	Nation	Olympics	Gold	Silver	Bronze	Total
1	Mutaz Essa Barshim	Qatar	2012–2024	1	2	1	4
2	Valeriy Brumel	Soviet Union	1960–1964	1	1	0	2
2	Jacek Wszoła	Poland	1976–1980	1	1	0	2
2	Javier Sotomayor	Cuba	1992–2000	1	1	0	2
2	Derek Drouin	Canada	2012–2016	1	1	0	2
6	Patrik Sjöberg	Sweden	1984–1992	0	2	1	3
7	John Thomas	United States	1960–1964	0	1	1	2
7	Hollis Conway	United States	1988–1992	0	1	1	2
7	Artur Partyka	Poland	1992–1996	0	1	1	2
10	Dwight Stones	United States	1972–1976	0	0	2	2

==== Medalists by country ====
Rank	Nation	Gold	Silver	Bronze	Total
1	United States	14	14	8	36
2	Soviet Union	4	1	3	8
3	Canada	2	2	0	4
4	Russia	2	0	1	3
5	Sweden	1	2	2	5
6	Poland	1	2	1	4
6	Qatar	1	2	1	4
8	Australia	1	1	1	3
8	East Germany	1	1	1	3
10	Cuba	1	1	0	2
11	Italy	1	0	0	1
11	New Zealand	1	0	0	1
11	West Germany	1	0	0	1
14	Great Britain	0	4	1	5
15	France	0	1	2	3
16	Germany	0	1	1	2
16	Hungary	0	1	1	2
18	Norway	0	1	0	1
19	Algeria	0	0	1	1
19	Belarus	0	0	1	1
19	Brazil	0	0	1	1
19	China	0	0	1	1
19	Czech Republic	0	0	1	1
19	Philippines	0	0	1	1
19	Ukraine	0	0	1	1

=== Women ===
Games	Gold	Silver	Bronze
1928 Amsterdam	Ethel Catherwood; Canada	Lien Gisolf; Netherlands	Mildred Wiley; United States
1932 Los Angeles	Jean Shiley; United States	Babe Didrikson; United States	Eva Dawes; Canada
1936 Berlin	Ibolya Csák; Hungary	Dorothy Odam; Great Britain	Elfriede Kaun; Germany
1948 London	Alice Coachman; United States	Dorothy Tyler; Great Britain	Micheline Ostermeyer; France
1952 Helsinki	Esther Brand; South Africa	Sheila Lerwill; Great Britain	Aleksandra Chudina; Soviet Union
1956 Melbourne	Mildred McDaniel; United States	Thelma Hopkins; Great Britain	none awarded
1956 Melbourne	Mildred McDaniel; United States	Mariya Pisareva; Soviet Union	none awarded
1960 Rome	Iolanda Balaș; Romania	Jarosława Jóźwiakowska; Poland	none awarded
1960 Rome	Iolanda Balaș; Romania	Dorothy Shirley; Great Britain	none awarded
1964 Tokyo	Iolanda Balaș; Romania	Michele Brown; Australia	Taisia Chenchik; Soviet Union
1968 Mexico City	Miloslava Rezková; Czechoslovakia	Antonina Okorokova; Soviet Union	Valentina Kozyr; Soviet Union
1972 Munich	Ulrike Meyfarth; West Germany	Yordanka Blagoeva; Bulgaria	Ilona Gusenbauer; Austria
1976 Montreal	Rosemarie Ackermann; East Germany	Sara Simeoni; Italy	Yordanka Blagoeva; Bulgaria
1980 Moscow	Sara Simeoni; Italy	Urszula Kielan; Poland	Jutta Kirst; East Germany
1984 Los Angeles	Ulrike Meyfarth; West Germany	Sara Simeoni; Italy	Joni Huntley; United States
1988 Seoul	Louise Ritter; United States	Stefka Kostadinova; Bulgaria	Tamara Bykova; Soviet Union
1992 Barcelona	Heike Henkel; Germany	Alina Astafei; Romania	Ioamnet Quintero; Cuba
1996 Atlanta	Stefka Kostadinova; Bulgaria	Niki Bakoyianni; Greece	Inha Babakova; Ukraine
2000 Sydney	Yelena Yelesina; Russia	Hestrie Cloete; South Africa	Kajsa Bergqvist; Sweden
2000 Sydney	Yelena Yelesina; Russia	Hestrie Cloete; South Africa	Oana Pantelimon; Romania
2004 Athens	Yelena Slesarenko; Russia	Hestrie Cloete; South Africa	Vita Styopina; Ukraine
2008 Beijing	Tia Hellebaut; Belgium	Blanka Vlašić; Croatia	Chaunté Howard; United States
2012 London	Anna Chicherova; Russia	Brigetta Barrett; United States	Ruth Beitia; Spain
2016 Rio de Janeiro	Ruth Beitia; Spain	Mirela Demireva; Bulgaria	Blanka Vlašić; Croatia
2020 Tokyo	Mariya Lasitskene; ROC	Nicola McDermott; Australia	Yaroslava Mahuchikh; Ukraine
2024 Paris	Yaroslava Mahuchikh; Ukraine	Nicola Olyslagers; Australia	Iryna Herashchenko; Ukraine
2024 Paris	Yaroslava Mahuchikh; Ukraine	Nicola Olyslagers; Australia	Eleanor Patterson; Australia

==== Multiple medalists ====
Rank	Athlete	Nation	Olympics	Gold	Silver	Bronze	Total
1	Iolanda Balaş	Romania	1960–1964	2	0	0	2
1	Ulrike Meyfarth	West Germany	1972–1984	2	0	0	2
3	Sara Simeoni	Italy	1976–1984	1	2	0	3
4	Stefka Kostadinova	Bulgaria	1988–1996	1	1	0	2
5	Ruth Beitia	Spain	2012–2016	1	0	1	2
5	Yaroslava Mahuchikh	Ukraine	2020–2024	1	0	1	2
7	Dorothy Tyler-Odam	Great Britain	1936–1948	0	2	0	2
7	Hestrie Cloete	South Africa	2000–2004	0	2	0	2
7	Nicola Olyslagers	Australia	2020–2024	0	2	0	2
10	Yordanka Blagoeva	Bulgaria	1972–1976	0	1	1	2
10	Blanka Vlašić	Croatia	2008–2016	0	1	1	2

==== Medalists by country ====
Rank	Nation	Gold	Silver	Bronze	Total
1	United States	4	2	3	9
2	Russia	3	0	0	3
3	Romania	2	1	1	4
4	West Germany	2	0	0	2
5	Bulgaria	1	3	1	5
6	Italy	1	2	0	3
6	South Africa	1	2	0	3
8	Ukraine	1	0	4	5
9	Canada	1	0	1	2
9	East Germany	1	0	1	2
9	Germany	1	0	1	2
9	Spain	1	0	1	2
13	Belgium	1	0	0	1
13	Czechoslovakia	1	0	0	1
13	Hungary	1	0	0	1
13	ROC	1	0	0	1
17	Great Britain	0	5	0	5
18	Australia	0	3	1	4
19	Soviet Union	0	2	4	6
20	Poland	0	2	0	2
21	Croatia	0	1	1	2
22	Greece	0	1	0	1
22	Netherlands	0	1	0	1
24	Austria	0	0	1	1
24	Cuba	0	0	1	1
24	France	0	0	1	1
24	Sweden	0	0	1	1

== Standing high jump ==
Standing high jump at the Olympic Games
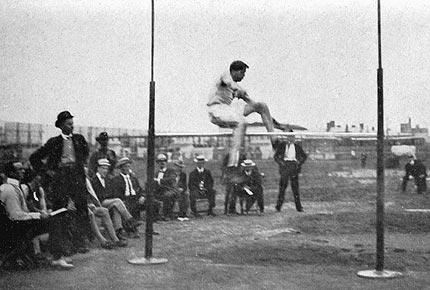
- Ray Ewry in the 1904 standing high jump competition

Overview
- Sport: Athletics
- Gender: Men
- Years held: Men: 1900–1912

Olympic record
- Men: 1.655 m Ray Ewry (1900)

From 1900 to 1912 a variation of the event was contested at the Olympics where athletes had to high jump from a standing position. This was one of three standing jumps to have featured on the Olympic programme, alongside the standing long jump (present for the same period) and the standing triple jump (1900 and 1904 only).

The standing jump competitions were dominated by Ray Ewry, who won the Olympic standing high jump titles in 1900, 1904 and 1908. His clearance of 1.655 m (5 ft 5 in) at the 1900 Olympics remained as the Olympic record for the event until its discontinuation in 1912. Ewry took Olympic three gold medals in standing jumps in both 1900 and 1904, then won the standing high and long jumps at the 1908 Olympics, as well as the 1906 Intercalated Games. After Ewry's retirement, Platt Adams became the winner of the final Olympic standing high jump competition in 1912.

The standing high jump—and standing jump events in general—had been a relatively common type of athletics event at the end of the 19th century, but became increasingly rare at top level national and international competitions as the 20th century progressed. The Olympic event remains the only major international competition to have featured the event, except for the 1919 and 1920 editions of the South American Championships in Athletics. The standing high jump retained some popularity as a championship event in Scandinavia in the second half of the century.

Games	Gold	Silver	Bronze
1900 Paris	Ray Ewry; United States	Irving Baxter; United States	Lewis Sheldon; United States
1904 St. Louis	Ray Ewry; United States	Joseph Stadler; United States	Lawson Robertson; United States
1908 London	Ray Ewry; United States	John Biller; United States Konstantinos Tsiklitiras; Greece	None awarded
1912 Stockholm	Platt Adams; United States	Benjamin Adams; United States	Konstantinos Tsiklitiras; Greece

== Intercalated Games ==
The 1906 Intercalated Games were held in Athens and at the time were officially recognised as part of the Olympic Games series, with the intention being to hold a games in Greece in two-year intervals between the internationally held Olympics. However, this plan never came to fruition and the International Olympic Committee (IOC) later decided not to recognise these games as part of the official Olympic series. Some sports historians continue to treat the results of these games as part of the Olympic canon.

Continuing its presence since the first Olympics, a men's high jump event was contested at the 1906 Games. The competition rules were exhausting for the athletes as the bar was incremented by one centimetre each time and all athletes had to attempt each height. This caused the event to be postponed when darkness fell and competition resumed the following morning. Irishman Con Leahy won the event for Great Britain with a mark of 1.775 m. Lajos Gönczy of Hungary, a 1900 high jump medallist, returned to the Olympic podium with 1.75 m for second. American Bert Kerrigan, who also competed in the pole vault and standing long jump, took third place alongside Themistoklis Diakidis of Greece.

Games	Gold	Silver	Bronze
1906 Athens	Con Leahy (GBR)	Lajos Gönczy (HUN)	Themistoklis Diakidis (GRE) Bert Kerrigan (USA)

The standing high jump variant was also contested at the Intercalated Games. Ray Ewry, who entered as the undefeated Olympic champion in the event, won a further gold medal with his mark of 1.56 m (5 ft 1 1/4 in). Second place was a tie between Martin Sheridan, Léon Dupont and Lawson Robertson, whose joint marks of 1.40 m (4 ft 7 in) was some way behind the winner.

Games	Gold	Silver	Bronze
1906 Athens	Ray Ewry (USA)	Martin Sheridan (USA) Léon Dupont (BEL) Lawson Robertson (USA)	

== Non-canonical Olympic events ==
In addition to the main 1900 Olympic men's high jump, a handicap competition was held four days later. All of the podium finishers in the event had failed to medal in the main Olympic final. Tore Blom was first with 2.05 m (35 cm handicap), Gyula Strausz placed second in 2.00 m (also 35 cm), while third place went to Waldemar Steffen with 1.95 m (30 cm handicap).

Two professionals-only contests were held in 1900. Mike Sweeney of the United States won with 1.80 m (the second best of the festival after Irv Baxter Olympic record in the amateur event). Another American, Otto Bruno Schoenfeld, was second in 1.75 m, while Noël Douet of France was third in 1.55 m. A handicap professional contest was also held but the results have not been located.

The handicap event returned at the 1904 Summer Olympics and the three Olympic finalists who failed to win medals comprised the top three. Ervin Barker won with 1.88 m off a 4.5 inch handicap, Lajos Gönczy was runner-up with a mark of 1.80 m with a three-inch handicap, and Emil Freymark took third, recording 1.80 m with a five-inch handicap.

These events are no longer considered part of the official Olympic history of the high jump or the athletics programme in general. Consequently, medals from these competitions have not been assigned to nations on the all-time medal tables.
