= List of multiple Olympic gold medalists =

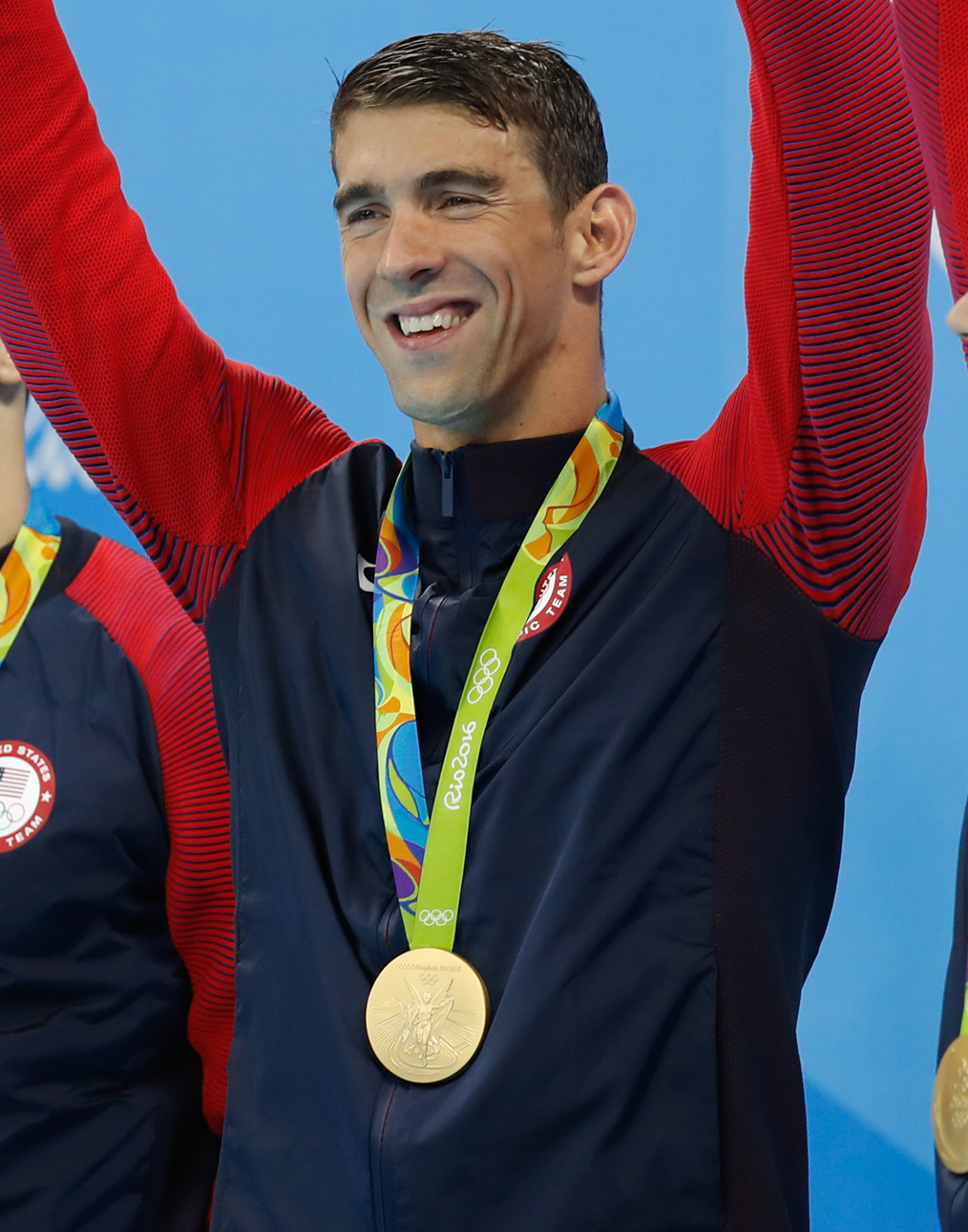
Michael Phelps has won a record 23 Olympic gold medals

This article lists the individuals who have won at least four gold medals at the Olympic Games or at least three gold medals in individual events.

== List of most Olympic gold medals over career ==
This is a partial list of multiple Olympic gold medalists, listing people who have won four or more Olympic gold medals. Medals won in the 1906 Intercalated Games are not included. (If they were, Ray Ewry would be third on the list with 10 gold.) It includes top-three placings in 1896 and 1900, before medals were awarded for top-three placings. The Olympics listed for each athlete only include games in which they won medals. See the particular article on the athlete for more details on when and for what nation an athlete competed. More medals are available in some events than others, and the number of events in which medals are available overall has changed over time.

Names in bold denote people that have competed in the most recent Olympics, namely 2026 Milano Cortina Winter Olympics and 2024 Paris Summer Olympics.

No.	Athlete	Nation	Sport	Years	Games	Gender	Gold	Silver	Bronze	Total
1	Michael Phelps	United States	Swimming	2004–2016	Summer	M	23	3	2	28
2	**Johannes Høsflot Klæbo**	Norway	Cross-country skiing	2018–2026	Winter	M	11	1	1	13
3	Larisa Latynina	Soviet Union	Gymnastics	1956–1964	Summer	F	9	5	4	18
4	**Katie Ledecky**	United States	Swimming	2012–2024	Summer	F	9	4	1	14
5	Paavo Nurmi	Finland	Athletics	1920–1928	Summer	M	9	3	0	12
6	Mark Spitz	United States	Swimming	1968–1972	Summer	M	9	1	1	11
7	**Caeleb Dressel**	United States	Swimming	2016–2024	Summer	M	9	1	0	10
7	Carl Lewis	United States	Athletics	1984–1996	Summer	M	9	1	0	10
9	**Isabell Werth**	Germany	Equestrian	1992–2024	Summer	F	8	6	0	14
10	Marit Bjørgen	Norway	Cross-country skiing	2002–2018	Winter	F	8	4	3	15
11	Ole Einar Bjørndalen	Norway	Biathlon	1998–2014	Winter	M	8	4	2	14
12	Bjørn Dæhlie	Norway	Cross-country skiing	1992–1998	Winter	M	8	4	0	12
12	Birgit Fischer	East Germany; Germany	Canoeing	1980–2004	Summer	F	8	4	0	12
14	Sawao Katō	Japan	Gymnastics	1968–1976	Summer	M	8	3	1	12
14	Jenny Thompson	United States	Swimming	1992–2004	Summer	F	8	3	1	12
16	Matt Biondi	United States	Swimming	1984–1992	Summer	M	8	2	1	11
17	**Lisa Carrington**	New Zealand	Canoeing	2012–2024	Summer	F	8	0	1	9
18	Usain Bolt	Jamaica	Athletics	2008–2016	Summer	M	8	0	0	8
18	Ray Ewry	United States	Athletics	1900–1908	Summer	M	8	0	0	8
20	Nikolai Andrianov	Soviet Union	Gymnastics	1972–1980	Summer	M	7	5	3	15
21	Boris Shakhlin	Soviet Union	Gymnastics	1956–1964	Summer	M	7	4	2	13
22	Věra Čáslavská	Czechoslovakia	Gymnastics	1960–1968	Summer	F	7	4	0	11
23	Viktor Chukarin	Soviet Union	Gymnastics	1952–1956	Summer	M	7	3	1	11
23	Allyson Felix	United States	Athletics	2004–2020	Summer	F	7	3	1	11
25	**Simone Biles**	United States	Gymnastics	2016–2024	Summer	F	7	2	2	11
26	Jason Kenny	Great Britain	Cycling	2008–2020	Summer	M	7	2	0	9
27	Aladár Gerevich	Hungary	Fencing	1932–1960	Summer	M	7	1	2	10
28	**Tobias Arlt**	Germany	Luge	2014–2026	Winter	M	7	0	1	8
28	**Tobias Wendl**	Germany	Luge	2014–2026	Winter	M	7	0	1	8
30	Svetlana Romashina	Russia; ROC	Artistic swimming	2008–2020	Summer	F	7	0	0	7
31	Edoardo Mangiarotti	Italy	Fencing	1936–1960	Summer	M	6	5	2	13
31	Ireen Wüst	Netherlands	Speed skating	2006–2022	Winter	F	6	5	2	13
33	**Emma McKeon**	Australia	Swimming	2016–2024	Summer	F	6	3	5	14
34	Ryan Lochte	United States	Swimming	2004–2016	Summer	M	6	3	3	12
35	Hubert Van Innis	Belgium	Archery	1900–1920	Summer	M	6	3	0	9
35	Lyubov Yegorova	Unified Team; Russia	Cross-country skiing	1992–1994	Winter	F	6	3	0	9
37	Akinori Nakayama	Japan	Gymnastics	1968–1972	Summer	M	6	2	2	10
38	Valentina Vezzali	Italy	Fencing	1996–2012	Summer	F	6	1	2	9
39	Gert Fredriksson	Sweden	Canoeing	1948–1960	Summer	M	6	1	1	8
39	Danuta Kozák	Hungary	Canoeing	2008–2020	Summer	F	6	1	1	8
41	Martin Fourcade	France	Biathlon	2010–2018	Winter	M	6	1	0	7
41	Chris Hoy	Great Britain	Cycling	2000–2012	Summer	M	6	1	0	7
43	Vitaly Scherbo	Unified Team; Belarus	Gymnastics	1992–1996	Summer	M	6	0	4	10
44	Ahn Hyun-soo; Viktor An	South Korea; Russia	Short-track speed skating	2006–2014	Winter	M	6	0	2	8
44	Reiner Klimke	United Team of Germany; West Germany	Equestrian	1964–1988	Summer	M	6	0	2	8
46	Natalie Geisenberger	Germany	Luge	2010–2022	Winter	F	6	0	1	7
46	Pál Kovács	Hungary	Fencing	1936–1960	Summer	M	6	0	1	7
48	Rudolf Kárpáti	Hungary	Fencing	1948–1960	Summer	M	6	0	0	6
48	**Ma Long**	China	Table tennis	2012–2024	Summer	M	6	0	0	6
48	Nedo Nadi	Italy	Fencing	1912–1920	Summer	M	6	0	0	6
48	Kristin Otto	East Germany	Swimming	1988	Summer	F	6	0	0	6
48	Lidiya Skoblikova	Soviet Union	Speed skating	1960–1964	Winter	F	6	0	0	6
48	**Diana Taurasi**	United States	Basketball	2004–2024	Summer	F	6	0	0	6
48	Amy Van Dyken	United States	Swimming	1996–2000	Summer	F	6	0	0	6
55	Takashi Ono	Japan	Gymnastics	1952–1964	Summer	M	5	4	4	13
56	Carl Osburn	United States	Shooting	1912–1924	Summer	M	5	4	2	11
57	Gary Hall Jr.	United States	Swimming	1996–2004	Summer	M	5	3	2	10
57	Ágnes Keleti	Hungary	Gymnastics	1952–1956	Summer	F	5	3	2	10
59	Nadia Comăneci	Romania	Gymnastics	1976–1980	Summer	F	5	3	1	9
59	**Quentin Fillon Maillet**	France	Biathlon	2022–2026	Winter	M	5	3	1	9
59	Ian Thorpe	Australia	Swimming	2000–2004	Summer	M	5	3	1	9
62	Ville Ritola	Finland	Athletics	1924–1928	Summer	M	5	3	0	8
63	Polina Astakhova	Soviet Union	Gymnastics	1956–1964	Summer	F	5	2	3	10
64	Johannes Thingnes Bø	Norway	Biathlon	2014–2022	Winter	M	5	2	2	9
64	**Ryan Murphy**	United States	Swimming	2016–2024	Summer	M	5	2	2	9
64	Claudia Pechstein	Germany	Speed skating	1992–2006	Winter	F	5	2	2	9
67	Elisabeta Lipă	Romania	Rowing	1984–2004	Summer	F	5	2	1	8
68	Yukio Endō	Japan	Gymnastics	1960–1968	Summer	M	5	2	0	7
68	Aaron Peirsol	United States	Swimming	2000–2008	Summer	M	5	2	0	7
70	**Kaylee McKeown**	Australia	Swimming	2020–2024	Summer	F	5	1	3	9
70	Mitsuo Tsukahara	Japan	Gymnastics	1968–1976	Summer	M	5	1	3	9
72	Nathan Adrian	United States	Swimming	2008–2016	Summer	M	5	1	2	8
72	**Mollie O'Callaghan**	Australia	Swimming	2020–2024	Summer	F	5	1	2	8
72	Bradley Wiggins	Great Britain	Cycling	2000–2016	Summer	M	5	1	2	8
75	Krisztina Egerszegi	Hungary	Swimming	1988–1996	Summer	F	5	1	1	7
75	Tom Jager	United States	Swimming	1984–1992	Summer	M	5	1	1	7
75	Larisa Lazutina	Unified Team; Russia	Cross-country skiing	1992–1998	Winter	F	5	1	1	7
75	Willis Augustus Lee	United States	Shooting	1920	Summer	M	5	1	1	7
75	Clas Thunberg	Finland	Speed skating	1924–1928	Winter	M	5	1	1	7
75	Dana Vollmer	United States	Swimming	2004–2016	Summer	F	5	1	1	7
75	Hans Günter Winkler	United Team of Germany; West Germany	Equestrian	1956–1976	Summer	M	5	1	1	7
75	Wu Minxia	China	Diving	2004–2016	Summer	F	5	1	1	7
83	Thomas Alsgaard	Norway	Cross-country skiing	1994–2002	Winter	M	5	1	0	6
83	Anton Heida	United States	Gymnastics	1904	Summer	M	5	1	0	6
83	Laura Kenny	Great Britain	Cycling	2012–2020	Summer	F	5	1	0	6
83	Nellie Kim	Soviet Union	Gymnastics	1976–1980	Summer	F	5	1	0	6
83	Ole Lilloe-Olsen	Norway	Shooting	1920–1924	Summer	M	5	1	0	6
83	Don Schollander	United States	Swimming	1964–1968	Summer	M	5	1	0	6
83	Elaine Thompson-Herah	Jamaica	Athletics	2016–2020	Summer	F	5	1	0	6
90	**Teddy Riner**	France	Judo	2008–2024	Summer	M	5	0	2	7
91	Bonnie Blair	United States	Speed skating	1988–1994	Winter	F	5	0	1	6
91	Georgeta Damian	Romania	Rowing	2000–2008	Summer	F	5	0	1	6
91	Missy Franklin	United States	Swimming	2012–2016	Summer	F	5	0	1	6
91	Alfred Lane	United States	Shooting	1912–1920	Summer	M	5	0	1	6
91	**Harrie Lavreysen**	Netherlands	Cycling	2020–2024	Summer	M	5	0	1	6
91	Steve Redgrave	Great Britain	Rowing	1984–2000	Summer	M	5	0	1	6
91	Johnny Weissmuller	United States	Swimming, Water polo	1924–1928	Summer	M	5	0	1	6
91	Zou Kai	China	Gymnastics	2008–2012	Summer	M	5	0	1	6
99	Sue Bird	United States	Basketball	2004–2020	Summer	F	5	0	0	5
99	Chen Ruolin	China	Diving	2008–2016	Summer	F	5	0	0	5
99	Anastasia Davydova	Russia	Artistic swimming	2004–2012	Summer	F	5	0	0	5
99	Morris Fisher	United States	Shooting	1920–1924	Summer	M	5	0	0	5
99	Eric Heiden	United States	Speed skating	1980	Winter	M	5	0	0	5
99	Natalia Ishchenko	Russia	Artistic swimming	2008–2016	Summer	F	5	0	0	5
99	**Kim Woo-jin**	South Korea	Archery	2016–2024	Summer	M	5	0	0	5
99	**Mijaín López**	Cuba	Wrestling	2008–2024	Summer	M	5	0	0	5
99	**Thorsten Margis**	Germany	Bobsleigh	2018–2026	Winter	M	5	0	0	5
108	Raisa Smetanina	Soviet Union; Unified Team	Cross-country skiing	1976–1992	Winter	F	4	5	1	10
109	Aleksandr Popov	Unified Team; Russia	Swimming	1992–2000	Summer	M	4	5	0	9
110	Dara Torres	United States	Swimming	1984–2008	Summer	F	4	4	4	12
111	Kornelia Ender	East Germany	Swimming	1972–1976	Summer	F	4	4	0	8
111	Dawn Fraser	Australia	Swimming	1956–1964	Summer	F	4	4	0	8
113	Allison Schmitt	United States	Swimming	2008–2020	Summer	F	4	3	3	10
114	Sixten Jernberg	Sweden	Cross-country skiing	1956–1964	Winter	M	4	3	2	9
114	Emil Hegle Svendsen	Norway	Biathlon	2010–2018	Winter	M	4	3	2	9
114	Ludmilla Tourischeva	Soviet Union	Gymnastics	1968–1976	Summer	F	4	3	2	9
117	Ricco Groß	Germany	Biathlon	1992–2006	Winter	M	4	3	1	8
117	Georges Miez	Switzerland	Gymnastics	1924–1936	Summer	M	4	3	1	8
117	Otto Olsen	Norway	Shooting	1920–1924	Summer	M	4	3	1	8
117	**Ariarne Titmus**	Australia	Swimming	2020–2024	Summer	F	4	3	1	8
121	**Choi Min-jeong**	South Korea	Short-track speed skating	2018–2026	Winter	F	4	3	0	7
121	Ivan Patzaichin	Romania	Canoeing	1968–1984	Summer	M	4	3	0	7
123	Alexei Nemov	Russia	Gymnastics	1996–2000	Summer	M	4	2	6	12
124	Sven Kramer	Netherlands	Speed skating	2006–2022	Winter	M	4	2	3	9
125	Kjetil André Aamodt	Norway	Alpine skiing	1992–2006	Winter	M	4	2	2	8
125	Inge de Bruijn	Netherlands	Swimming	2000–2004	Summer	F	4	2	2	8
125	Sven Fischer	Germany	Biathlon	1994–2006	Winter	M	4	2	2	8
125	Galina Kulakova	Soviet Union	Cross-country skiing	1972–1980	Winter	F	4	2	2	8
125	Jason Lezak	United States	Swimming	2000–2012	Summer	M	4	2	2	8
125	Roland Matthes	East Germany	Swimming	1968–1976	Summer	M	4	2	2	8
131	Ivar Ballangrud	Norway	Speed skating	1928–1936	Winter	M	4	2	1	7
131	Einar Liberg	Norway	Shooting	1908–1924	Summer	M	4	2	1	7
133	Giuseppe Delfino	Italy	Fencing	1952–1964	Summer	M	4	2	0	6
133	Christian d'Oriola	France	Fencing	1948–1956	Summer	M	4	2	0	6
133	**Francesco Friedrich**	Germany	Bobsleigh	2018–2026	Winter	M	4	2	0	6
133	Lucien Gaudin	France	Fencing	1920–1928	Summer	M	4	2	0	6
133	Jørgen Graabak	Norway	Nordic combined	2014–2022	Winter	M	4	2	0	6
133	Matt Grevers	United States	Swimming	2008–2012	Summer	M	4	2	0	6
133	Guo Jingjing	China	Diving	2000–2008	Summer	F	4	2	0	6
133	Jin Jong-oh	South Korea	Shooting	2004–2016	Summer	M	4	2	0	6
133	Olga Korbut	Soviet Union	Gymnastics	1972–1976	Summer	F	4	2	0	6
133	Janica Kostelić	Croatia	Alpine skiing	2002–2006	Winter	F	4	2	0	6
133	Kevin Kuske	Germany	Bobsleigh	2002–2018	Winter	M	4	2	0	6
144	Cate Campbell	Australia	Swimming	2008–2020	Summer	F	4	1	3	8
144	Giovanna Trillini	Italy	Fencing	1992–2008	Summer	F	4	1	3	8
146	Charles Daniels	United States	Swimming	1904–1908	Summer	M	4	1	2	7
146	Kosuke Kitajima	Japan	Swimming	2004–2012	Summer	M	4	1	2	7
146	Lloyd Spooner	United States	Shooting	1920	Summer	M	4	1	2	7
146	Libby Trickett	Australia	Swimming	2004–2012	Summer	F	4	1	2	7
150	**Cao Yuan**	China	Diving	2012–2024	Summer	M	4	1	1	6
150	Darya Domracheva	Belarus	Biathlon	2010–2018	Winter	F	4	1	1	6
150	Charles Hamelin	Canada	Short-track speed skating	2006–2022	Winter	M	4	1	1	6
150	Doina Ignat	Romania	Rowing	1992–2008	Summer	F	4	1	1	6
150	Therese Johaug	Norway	Cross-country skiing	2010–2022	Winter	F	4	1	1	6
150	Kim Soo-nyung	South Korea	Archery	1988–2000	Summer	F	4	1	1	6
150	Elena Novikova-Belova	Soviet Union	Fencing	1968–1980	Summer	F	4	1	1	6
150	Murray Rose	Australia	Swimming	1956–1960	Summer	M	4	1	1	6
150	Viktor Sidyak	Soviet Union	Fencing	1968–1980	Summer	M	4	1	1	6
150	Gunde Svan	Sweden	Cross-country skiing	1984–1988	Winter	M	4	1	1	6
150	Leontien van Moorsel	Netherlands	Cycling	2000–2004	Summer	F	4	1	1	6
150	Katrin Wagner-Augustin	Germany	Canoeing	2000–2012	Summer	F	4	1	1	6
150	Wang Meng	China	Short-track speed skating	2006–2010	Winter	F	4	1	1	6
163	Ben Ainslie	Great Britain	Sailing	1996–2012	Summer	M	4	1	0	5
163	Vladimir Artemov	Soviet Union	Gymnastics	1988	Summer	M	4	1	0	5
163	Evelyn Ashford	United States	Athletics	1984–1992	Summer	F	4	1	0	5
163	Janet Evans	United States	Swimming	1988–1992	Summer	F	4	1	0	5
163	Ian Ferguson	New Zealand	Canoeing	1984–1988	Summer	M	4	1	0	5
163	Ramón Fonst	Cuba	Fencing	1900–1904	Summer	M	4	1	0	5
163	Fu Mingxia	China	Diving	1992–2000	Summer	F	4	1	0	5
163	Yevgeny Grishin	Soviet Union	Speed skating	1956–1964	Winter	M	4	1	0	5
163	**Vincent Hancock**	United States	Shooting	2008–2024	Summer	M	4	1	0	5
163	Jayna Hefford	Canada	Ice hockey	1998–2014	Winter	F	4	1	0	5
163	**Michael Jung**	Germany	Equestrian	2012–2024	Summer	M	4	1	0	5
163	Yana Klochkova	Ukraine	Swimming	2000–2004	Summer	F	4	1	0	5
163	Hannes Kolehmainen	Finland	Athletics	1912–1920	Summer	M	4	1	0	5
163	Johann Olav Koss	Norway	Speed skating	1992–1994	Winter	M	4	1	0	5
163	André Lange	Germany	Bobsleigh	2002–2010	Winter	M	4	1	0	5
163	Greg Louganis	United States	Diving	1976–1988	Summer	M	4	1	0	5
163	Valentin Muratov	Soviet Union	Gymnastics	1952–1956	Summer	M	4	1	0	5
163	John Naber	United States	Swimming	1976	Summer	M	4	1	0	5
163	Matti Nykänen	Finland	Ski jumping	1984–1988	Winter	M	4	1	0	5
163	**Jens Lurås Oftebro**	Norway	Nordic combined	2022–2026	Winter	M	4	1	0	5
163	Charles Pahud de Mortanges	Netherlands	Equestrian	1924–1936	Summer	M	4	1	0	5
163	Mel Sheppard	United States	Athletics	1908–1912	Summer	M	4	1	0	5
163	Ecaterina Szabo	Romania	Gymnastics	1984	Summer	F	4	1	0	5
163	Alexander Tikhonov	Soviet Union	Biathlon	1968–1980	Winter	M	4	1	0	5
163	Wang Nan	China	Table tennis	2000–2008	Summer	F	4	1	0	5
163	Hayley Wickenheiser	Canada	Ice hockey	1998–2014	Winter	F	4	1	0	5
163	Venus Williams	United States	Tennis	2000–2016	Summer	F	4	1	0	5
163	Emil Zátopek	Czechoslovakia	Athletics	1948–1952	Summer	M	4	1	0	5
163	Nikolay Zimyatov	Soviet Union	Cross-country skiing	1980–1984	Winter	M	4	1	0	5
192	Győző Kulcsár	Hungary	Fencing	1964–1976	Summer	M	4	0	2	6
193	Ludger Beerbaum	West Germany; Germany	Equestrian	1988–2016	Summer	M	4	0	1	5
193	Kathrin Boron	Germany	Rowing	1992–2008	Summer	F	4	0	1	5
193	Chun Lee-kyung	South Korea	Short-track speed skating	1994–1998	Winter	F	4	0	1	5
193	Teresa Edwards	United States	Basketball	1984–2000	Summer	F	4	0	1	5
193	Marcus Hurley	United States	Cycling	1904	Summer	M	4	0	1	5
193	Li Xiaopeng	China	Gymnastics	2000–2008	Summer	M	4	0	1	5
193	**Léon Marchand**	France	Swimming	2024	Summer	M	4	0	1	5
193	Jon Olsen	United States	Swimming	1992–1996	Summer	M	4	0	1	5
193	Stanislav Pozdnyakov	Unified Team; Russia	Fencing	1992–2004	Summer	M	4	0	1	5
193	Sanya Richards-Ross	United States	Athletics	2004–2012	Summer	F	4	0	1	5
193	Viorica Susanu	Romania	Rowing	2000–2008	Summer	F	4	0	1	5
193	Giorgio Zampori	Italy	Gymnastics	1912–1924	Summer	M	4	0	1	5
205	Simon Ammann	Switzerland	Ski jumping	2002–2010	Winter	M	4	0	0	4
205	Fanny Blankers-Koen	Netherlands	Athletics	1948	Summer	F	4	0	0	4
205	Tamika Catchings	United States	Basketball	2004–2016	Summer	F	4	0	0	4
205	**Chen Meng**	China	Table tennis	2020–2024	Summer	F	4	0	0	4
205	Dario Cologna	Switzerland	Cross-country skiing	2010–2018	Winter	M	4	0	0	4
205	Betty Cuthbert	Australia	Athletics	1956–1964	Summer	F	4	0	0	4
205	Tamás Darnyi	Hungary	Swimming	1988–1992	Summer	M	4	0	0	4
205	Deng Yaping	China	Table tennis	1992–1996	Summer	F	4	0	0	4
205	Harrison Dillard	United States	Athletics	1948–1952	Summer	M	4	0	0	4
205	**Kevin Durant**	United States	Basketball	2012–2024	Summer	M	4	0	0	4
205	Paul Bert Elvstrøm	Denmark	Sailing	1948–1960	Summer	M	4	0	0	4
205	Anastasia Ermakova	Russia	Artistic swimming	2004–2008	Summer	F	4	0	0	4
205	Mohamed Farah	Great Britain	Athletics	2012–2016	Summer	M	4	0	0	4
205	Sylvia Fowles	United States	Basketball	2008–2020	Summer	F	4	0	0	4
205	Jenő Fuchs	Hungary	Fencing	1908–1912	Summer	M	4	0	0	4
205	Kaori Icho	Japan	Wrestling	2004–2016	Summer	F	4	0	0	4
205	Michael Johnson	United States	Athletics	1992–2000	Summer	M	4	0	0	4
205	Robert Korzeniowski	Poland	Athletics	1996–2004	Summer	M	4	0	0	4
205	Alvin Kraenzlein	United States	Athletics	1900	Summer	M	4	0	0	4
205	Lenny Krayzelburg	United States	Swimming	2000–2004	Summer	M	4	0	0	4
205	Viktor Krovopuskov	Soviet Union	Fencing	1976–1980	Summer	M	4	0	0	4
205	Lisa Leslie	United States	Basketball	1996–2008	Summer	F	4	0	0	4
205	Pat McCormick	United States	Diving	1952–1956	Summer	F	4	0	0	4
205	**Sydney McLaughlin-Levrone**	United States	Athletics	2020–2024	Summer	F	4	0	0	4
205	Al Oerter	United States	Athletics	1956–1968	Summer	M	4	0	0	4
205	Caroline Ouellette	Canada	Ice hockey	2002–2014	Winter	F	4	0	0	4
205	Jesse Owens	United States	Athletics	1936	Summer	M	4	0	0	4
205	Carlo Pavesi	Italy	Fencing	1952–1960	Summer	M	4	0	0	4
205	Matthew Pinsent	Great Britain	Rowing	1992–2004	Summer	M	4	0	0	4
205	Paulo Radmilovic	Great Britain	Water polo, Swimming	1908–1920	Summer	M	4	0	0	4
205	**Max Rendschmidt**	Germany	Canoeing	2016–2024	Summer	M	4	0	0	4
205	Henri Saint Cyr	Sweden	Equestrian	1952–1956	Summer	M	4	0	0	4
205	Vladimir Salnikov	Soviet Union	Swimming	1980–1988	Summer	M	4	0	0	4
205	Carl Schuhmann	Germany	Gymnastics, Wrestling	1896	Summer	M	4	0	0	4
205	Shi Tingmao	China	Diving	2016–2020	Summer	F	4	0	0	4
205	Nicole Uphoff	West Germany; Germany	Equestrian	1988–1992	Summer	F	4	0	0	4
205	Lasse Virén	Finland	Athletics	1972–1976	Summer	M	4	0	0	4
205	**Jessica von Bredow-Werndl**	Germany	Equestrian	2020–2024	Summer	F	4	0	0	4
205	Thomas Wassberg	Sweden	Cross-country skiing	1980–1988	Winter	M	4	0	0	4
205	Serena Williams	United States	Tennis	2000–2012	Summer	F	4	0	0	4
205	Bärbel Wöckel	East Germany	Athletics	1976–1980	Summer	F	4	0	0	4
205	Zhang Yining	China	Table tennis	2004–2008	Summer	F	4	0	0	4

=== Timeline ===
This is a progressive list of Olympians that have held the record for most titles won. It includes titles won in 1896 and 1900, before gold medals were awarded for first place. All record-holders have competed at Summer Games rather than Winter Games.

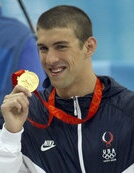
Michael Phelps, holder of the record for the most Olympic gold medals, with one of his medals at the 2008 Summer Olympics

Gold medals	Date	Athlete	Nation	Sport	Record gold-medal event	Earlier gold-medal events	Gender
1	1896-04-06	James Connolly	United States	Athletics	Triple jump	—	M
1	1896-04-06	Robert Garrett	United States	Athletics	Discus	—	M
1	1896-04-07	Ellery Clark	United States	Athletics	Long jump	—	M
1	1896-04-07	Thomas Burke	United States	Athletics	400 metres	—	M
2	1896-04-07	Robert Garrett	United States	Athletics	Shot put	see above	M
2	1896-04-09	Edwin Flack	Australia	Athletics	800 metres	1896 - 1	M
2	1896-04-09	Fritz Hofmann, Konrad Böcker, Alfred Flatow, Gustav Flatow, Georg Hilmar, Fritz Manteuffel, Karl Neukirch, Richard Röstel, Gustav Schuft, Carl Schuhmann, Hermann Weingärtner	Germany	Gymnastics	Team horizontal bar	1896 - 1	M
3	1896-04-09	Carl Schuhmann	Germany	Gymnastics	Vault	see previous	M
3	1896-04-09	Hermann Weingärtner	Germany	Gymnastics	Horizontal bar	see above	M
3	1896-04-10	Alfred Flatow	Germany	Gymnastics	Parallel bars	see above	M
4	1896-04-11	Carl Schuhmann	Germany	Wrestling	Greco-Roman	see above	M
4	1900-07-16	Alvin Kraenzlein	United States	Athletics	200 metre hurdles	1900 - 1, 2, 3	M
4	1904-08-05	Marcus Hurley	United States	Cycling	1 mile	1904 - 1, 2, 3	M
4	1904-08-29	Ray Ewry	United States	Athletics	Standing long jump	1900 - 1, 2, 3	M
5	1904-08-31	Ray Ewry	United States	Athletics	Standing high jump	1900 - 1, 2, 3	M
6	1904-09-03	Ray Ewry	United States	Athletics	Standing triple jump	1900 - 1, 2, 3	M
7	1908-07-20	Ray Ewry	United States	Athletics	Standing long jump	1900 - 1, 2, 3	M
8	1908-07-23	Ray Ewry	United States	Athletics	Standing high jump	1900 - 1, 2, 3	M
8	1924-07-13	Paavo Nurmi	Finland	Athletics	Team cross-country	1920 - 1, 2, 3; 1924 - 4, 5, 6, 7	M
9	1928-07-29	Paavo Nurmi	Finland	Athletics	10000 metres	1920 - 1, 2, 3; 1924 - 4, 5, 6, 7	M
9	1964-10-23	Larisa Latynina	Soviet Union	Gymnastics	Floor exercise	1956 - 1, 2, 3, 4; 1960 - 5, 6, 7; 1964 - 8	F
9	2008-08-12	Michael Phelps	United States	Swimming	200 metre freestyle	2004 - 1, 2, 3, 4, 5, 6; 2008 - 7, 8	M
10	2008-08-13	Michael Phelps	United States	Swimming	200 metre butterfly	2004 - 1, 2, 3, 4, 5, 6; 2008 - 7, 8	M
11	2008-08-13	Michael Phelps	United States	Swimming	4 × 200 metre freestyle relay	2004 - 1, 2, 3, 4, 5, 6; 2008 - 7, 8	M
12	2008-08-15	Michael Phelps	United States	Swimming	200 metre individual medley	2004 - 1, 2, 3, 4, 5, 6; 2008 - 7, 8	M
13	2008-08-16	Michael Phelps	United States	Swimming	100 metre butterfly	2004 - 1, 2, 3, 4, 5, 6; 2008 - 7, 8	M
14	2008-08-17	Michael Phelps	United States	Swimming	4 × 100 metre medley relay	2004 - 1, 2, 3, 4, 5, 6; 2008 - 7, 8	M
15	2012-07-31	Michael Phelps	United States	Swimming	4 × 200 metre freestyle relay	2004 - 1, 2, 3, 4, 5, 6; 2008 - 7, 8	M
16	2012-08-02	Michael Phelps	United States	Swimming	200 metre individual medley	2004 - 1, 2, 3, 4, 5, 6; 2008 - 7, 8	M
17	2012-08-03	Michael Phelps	United States	Swimming	100 metre butterfly	2004 - 1, 2, 3, 4, 5, 6; 2008 - 7, 8	M
18	2012-08-04	Michael Phelps	United States	Swimming	4 × 100 metre medley relay	2004 - 1, 2, 3, 4, 5, 6; 2008 - 7, 8	M
19	2016-08-07	Michael Phelps	United States	Swimming	4 × 100 metre freestyle relay	2004 - 1, 2, 3, 4, 5, 6; 2008 - 7, 8	M
20	2016-08-09	Michael Phelps	United States	Swimming	200 metre butterfly	2004 - 1, 2, 3, 4, 5, 6; 2008 - 7, 8	M
21	2016-08-09	Michael Phelps	United States	Swimming	4 × 200 metre freestyle relay	2004 - 1, 2, 3, 4, 5, 6; 2008 - 7, 8	M
22	2016-08-11	Michael Phelps	United States	Swimming	200 metre individual medley	2004 - 1, 2, 3, 4, 5, 6; 2008 - 7, 8	M
23	2016-08-13	Michael Phelps	United States	Swimming	4 × 100 metre medley relay	2004 - 1, 2, 3, 4, 5, 6; 2008 - 7, 8	M

== List of most career gold medals in individual events ==
This list currently includes all Olympians with three or more gold medals won as individuals (not as part of a team of two or more).

No.	Athlete	Nation	Sport	Years	Games	Gender	Gold	Silver	Bronze	Total
1	Michael Phelps	United States	Swimming	2004–2016	Summer	M	13	2	1	16
2	Katie Ledecky	United States	Swimming	2012–2024	Summer	F	8	1	1	10
3	Ray Ewry	United States	Athletics	1900–1908	Summer	M	8	0	0	8
4	Věra Čáslavská	Czechoslovakia	Gymnastics	1964–1968	Summer	F	7	1	0	8
4	Carl Lewis	United States	Athletics	1984–1996	Summer	M	7	1	0	8
6	Larisa Latynina	Soviet Union	Gymnastics	1956–1964	Summer	F	6	5	3	14
7	Nikolai Andrianov	Soviet Union	Gymnastics	1972–1980	Summer	M	6	3	3	12
8	Bjørn Dæhlie	Norway	Cross-country skiing	1992–1998	Winter	M	6	3	0	9
8	Paavo Nurmi	Finland	Athletics	1920–1928	Summer	M	6	3	0	9
10	Boris Shakhlin	Soviet Union	Gymnastics	1956–1964	Summer	M	6	2	2	10
11	Johannes Høsflot Klæbo	Norway	Cross-country skiing	2018–2026	Winter	M	6	0	1	7
12	Usain Bolt	Jamaica	Athletics	2008–2016	Summer	M	6	0	0	6
12	Lidiya Skoblikova	Soviet Union	Speed skating	1960–1964	Winter	F	6	0	0	6
14	Ireen Wüst	Netherlands	Speed skating	2006–2022	Winter	F	5	4	1	10
15	Marit Bjørgen	Norway	Cross-country skiing	2002–2018	Winter	F	5	3	2	10
16	Ole Einar Bjørndalen	Norway	Biathlon	1998–2014	Winter	M	5	3	1	9
16	Viktor Chukarin	Soviet Union	Gymnastics	1952–1956	Summer	M	5	3	1	9
16	Sawao Kato	Japan	Gymnastics	1968–1976	Summer	M	5	3	1	9
19	Simone Biles	United States	Gymnastics	2016–2024	Summer	F	5	1	2	8
20	Nadia Comăneci	Romania	Gymnastics	1976–1980	Summer	F	5	1	1	7
20	Krisztina Egerszegi	Hungary	Swimming	1988–1996	Summer	F	5	1	1	7
20	Gert Fredriksson	Sweden	Canoeing	1948–1960	Summer	M	5	1	1	7
20	Clas Thunberg	Finland	Speed skating	1924–1928	Winter	M	5	1	1	7
24	Martin Fourcade	France	Biathlon	2010–2018	Winter	M	5	1	0	6
25	Vitaly Scherbo	Unified Team; Belarus	Gymnastics	1992–1996	Summer	M	5	0	4	9
26	Bonnie Blair	United States	Speed skating	1988–1994	Winter	F	5	0	1	6
26	Lisa Carrington	New Zealand	Canoeing	2012–2024	Summer	F	5	0	1	6
28	Eric Heiden	United States	Speed skating	1980	Winter	M	5	0	0	5
28	Mijaín López	Cuba	Wrestling	2008–2024	Summer	M	5	0	0	5
30	Lyubov Yegorova	Unified Team; Russia	Cross-country skiing	1992–1994	Winter	F	4	3	0	7
31	Kjetil André Aamodt	Norway	Alpine skiing	1992–2006	Winter	M	4	2	2	8
31	Akinori Nakayama	Japan	Gymnastics	1968–1972	Summer	M	4	2	2	8
31	Claudia Pechstein	Germany	Speed skating	1992–2006	Winter	F	4	2	2	8
34	Ivar Ballangrud	Norway	Speed skating	1928–1936	Winter	M	4	2	1	7
35	Jin Jong-oh	South Korea	Shooting	2004–2016	Summer	M	4	2	0	6
35	Janica Kostelić	Croatia	Alpine skiing	2002–2006	Winter	F	4	2	0	6
35	Hubert Van Innis	Belgium	Archery	1900–1920	Summer	M	4	2	0	6
38	Inge de Bruijn	Netherlands	Swimming	2000–2004	Summer	F	4	1	1	6
38	Ágnes Keleti	Hungary	Gymnastics	1952–1956	Summer	F	4	1	1	6
38	Mark Spitz	United States	Swimming	1968–1972	Summer	M	4	1	1	6
38	Leontien van Moorsel	Netherlands	Cycling	2000–2004	Summer	F	4	1	1	6
42	Ben Ainslie	Great Britain	Sailing	1996–2012	Summer	M	4	1	0	5
42	Janet Evans	United States	Swimming	1988–1992	Summer	F	4	1	0	5
42	Yevgeny Grishin	Soviet Union	Speed skating	1956–1964	Winter	M	4	1	0	5
42	Anton Heida	United States	Gymnastics	1904	Summer	M	4	1	0	5
42	Jason Kenny	Great Britain	Cycling	2008–2020	Summer	M	4	1	0	5
42	Yana Klochkova	Ukraine	Swimming	2000–2004	Summer	F	4	1	0	5
42	Johann Olav Koss	Norway	Speed skating	1992–1994	Winter	M	4	1	0	5
42	Greg Louganis	United States	Diving	1976–1988	Summer	M	4	1	0	5
42	Aleksandr Popov	Unified Team; Russia	Swimming	1992–2000	Summer	M	4	1	0	5
42	Emil Zátopek	Czechoslovakia	Athletics	1948–1952	Summer	M	4	1	0	5
52	Ahn Hyun-soo; Viktor An	South Korea; Russia	Short-track speed skating	2006–2014	Winter	M	4	0	2	6
53	Marcus Hurley	United States	Cycling	1904	Summer	M	4	0	1	5
53	Roland Matthes	East Germany	Swimming	1968–1976	Summer	M	4	0	1	5
53	Kaylee McKeown	Australia	Swimming	2020–2024	Summer	F	4	0	1	5
56	Simon Ammann	Switzerland	Ski jumping	2002–2010	Winter	M	4	0	0	4
56	Dario Cologna	Switzerland	Cross-country skiing	2010–2018	Winter	M	4	0	0	4
56	Tamás Darnyi	Hungary	Swimming	1988–1992	Summer	M	4	0	0	4
56	Paul Bert Elvstrøm	Denmark	Sailing	1948–1960	Summer	M	4	0	0	4
56	Mohamed Farah	Great Britain	Athletics	2012–2016	Summer	M	4	0	0	4
56	Fu Mingxia	China	Diving	1992–2000	Summer	F	4	0	0	4
56	Vincent Hancock	United States	Shooting	2008–2024	Summer	M	4	0	0	4
56	Chris Hoy	Great Britain	Cycling	2004–2012	Summer	M	4	0	0	4
56	Kaori Icho	Japan	Wrestling	2004–2016	Summer	F	4	0	0	4
56	Kosuke Kitajima	Japan	Swimming	2004–2008	Summer	M	4	0	0	4
56	Hannes Kolehmainen	Finland	Athletics	1912–1920	Summer	M	4	0	0	4
56	Robert Korzeniowski	Poland	Athletics	1996–2004	Summer	M	4	0	0	4
56	Alvin Kraenzlein	United States	Athletics	1900	Summer	M	4	0	0	4
56	Léon Marchand	France	Swimming	2024	Summer	M	4	0	0	4
56	Pat McCormick	United States	Diving	1952–1956	Summer	F	4	0	0	4
56	Al Oerter	United States	Athletics	1956–1968	Summer	M	4	0	0	4
56	Kristin Otto	East Germany	Swimming	1988	Summer	F	4	0	0	4
56	Elaine Thompson-Herah	Jamaica	Athletics	2016–2020	Summer	F	4	0	0	4
56	Lasse Virén	Finland	Athletics	1972–1976	Summer	M	4	0	0	4
75	Karin Enke	East Germany	Speed skating	1980–1988	Winter	F	3	4	1	8
75	Gunda Niemann-Stirnemann	Germany	Speed skating	1992–1998	Winter	F	3	4	1	8
77	Takashi Ono	Japan	Gymnastics	1952–1960	Summer	M	3	3	4	10
78	Sixten Jernberg	Sweden	Cross-country skiing	1956–1964	Winter	M	3	3	1	7
79	Eileen Gu	China	Freestyle skiing	2022–2026	Winter	F	3	3	0	6
79	Anastasiya Kuzmina	Slovakia	Biathlon	2010–2018	Winter	F	3	3	0	6
79	Ville Ritola	Finland	Athletics	1924–1928	Summer	M	3	3	0	6
79	Ariarne Titmus	Australia	Swimming	2020–2024	Summer	F	3	3	0	6
83	Alexei Nemov	Russia	Gymnastics	1996–2000	Summer	M	3	2	5	10
84	Martina Sáblíková	Czech Republic	Speed skating	2010–2022	Winter	F	3	2	2	7
85	George Eyser	United States	Gymnastics	1904	Summer	M	3	2	1	6
85	Knut Holmann	Norway	Canoeing	1992–2000	Summer	M	3	2	1	6
85	Ralph Rose	United States	Athletics	1904–1912	Summer	M	3	2	1	6
85	Sarah Sjöström	Sweden	Swimming	2016–2024	Summer	F	3	2	1	6
89	Klaus Dibiasi	Italy	Diving	1964–1976	Summer	M	3	2	0	5
89	Georg Hackl	West Germany; Germany	Luge	1988–2002	Winter	M	3	2	0	5
89	Sven Kramer	Netherlands	Speed skating	2006–2018	Winter	M	3	2	0	5
89	Georges Miez	Switzerland	Gymnastics	1928–1936	Summer	M	3	2	0	5
89	Aaron Peirsol	United States	Swimming	2000–2008	Summer	M	3	2	0	5
89	Ralf Schumann	East Germany; Germany	Shooting	1988–2008	Summer	M	3	2	0	5
89	Sun Yang	China	Swimming	2012–2016	Summer	M	3	2	0	5
89	Alberto Tomba	Italy	Alpine skiing	1988–1994	Winter	M	3	2	0	5
97	Jessica Fox	Australia	Canoeing	2012–2024	Summer	F	3	1	2	6
97	Johan Grøttumsbråten	Norway	Nordic combined, Cross-country skiing	1924–1932	Winter	M	3	1	2	6
97	Jackie Joyner-Kersee	United States	Athletics	1984–1996	Summer	F	3	1	2	6
97	Kim Rhode	United States	Shooting	1996–2016	Summer	F	3	1	2	6
101	Charles Daniels	United States	Swimming	1904–1908	Summer	M	3	1	1	5
101	Darya Domracheva	Belarus	Biathlon	2010–2018	Winter	F	3	1	1	5
101	Quentin Fillon Maillet	France	Biathlon	2022–2026	Winter	M	3	1	1	5
101	Shane Gould	Australia	Swimming	1972	Summer	F	3	1	1	5
101	Therese Johaug	Norway	Cross-country skiing	2014–2022	Winter	F	3	1	1	5
101	Li Ning	China	Gymnastics	1984	Summer	M	3	1	1	5
101	Vreni Schneider	Switzerland	Alpine skiing	1988–1994	Winter	F	3	1	1	5
101	Daniela Silivaş	Romania	Gymnastics	1988	Summer	F	3	1	1	5
101	Leon Štukelj	Yugoslavia	Gymnastics	1924–1936	Summer	M	3	1	1	5
101	Ian Thorpe	Australia	Swimming	2000–2004	Summer	M	3	1	1	5
101	Pieter van den Hoogenband	Netherlands	Swimming	2000–2004	Summer	M	3	1	1	5
101	Valentina Vezzali	Italy	Fencing	1996–2012	Summer	F	3	1	1	5
101	Wang Meng	China	Short-track speed skating	2006–2010	Winter	F	3	1	1	5
114	Vladimir Artemov	Soviet Union	Gymnastics	1988	Summer	M	3	1	0	4
114	Kenenisa Bekele	Ethiopia	Athletics	2004–2008	Summer	M	3	1	0	4
114	Niccolò Campriani	Italy	Shooting	2012–2016	Summer	M	3	1	0	4
114	Deborah Compagnoni	Italy	Alpine skiing	1992–1998	Winter	F	3	1	0	4
114	Kornelia Ender	East Germany	Swimming	1972–1976	Summer	F	3	1	0	4
114	Bobby Finke	United States	Swimming	2020–2024	Summer	F	3	1	0	4
114	John Flanagan	United States	Athletics	1900–1908	Summer	M	3	1	0	4
114	Ramón Fonst	Cuba	Fencing	1900–1904	Summer	M	3	1	0	4
114	Dawn Fraser	Australia	Swimming	1956–1964	Summer	F	3	1	0	4
114	Gillis Grafström	Sweden	Figure skating	1920–1932	Both	M	3	1	0	4
114	Michael Gross	West Germany	Swimming	1984–1988	Summer	M	3	1	0	4
114	Tomas Gustafson	Sweden	Speed skating	1984–1988	Winter	M	3	1	0	4
114	Harry Hillman	United States	Athletics	1904–1908	Summer	M	3	1	0	4
114	Maria Höfl-Riesch	Germany	Alpine skiing	2010–2014	Winter	F	3	1	0	4
114	Katinka Hosszú	Hungary	Swimming	2016	Summer	F	3	1	0	4
114	Aleksandr Karelin	Soviet Union; Unified Team; Russia	Wrestling	1988–2000	Summer	M	3	1	0	4
114	Nellie Kim	Soviet Union	Gymnastics	1976–1980	Summer	F	3	1	0	4
114	Faith Kipyegon	Kenya	Athletics	2016–2024	Summer	F	3	1	0	4
114	Ingrid Krämer	United Team of Germany	Diving	1960–1964	Summer	F	3	1	0	4
114	Summer McIntosh	Canada	Swimming	2024	Summer	F	3	1	0	4
114	Matti Nykänen	Finland	Ski jumping	1984–1988	Winter	M	3	1	0	4
114	Tamara Press	Soviet Union	Athletics	1960–1964	Summer	F	3	1	0	4
114	Myer Prinstein	United States	Athletics	1900–1904	Summer	M	3	1	0	4
114	Murray Rose	Australia	Swimming	1956–1960	Summer	M	3	1	0	4
114	Viktor Saneyev	Soviet Union	Athletics	1968–1980	Summer	M	3	1	0	4
114	Ard Schenk	Netherlands	Speed skating	1968–1972	Winter	M	3	1	0	4
114	Mikaela Shiffrin	United States	Alpine skiing	2014–2026	Winter	F	3	1	0	4
114	Ecaterina Szabo	Romania	Gymnastics	1984	Summer	F	3	1	0	4
114	Anky van Grunsven	Netherlands	Equestrian	1996–2008	Summer	F	3	1	0	4
114	Saori Yoshida	Japan	Wrestling	2004–2016	Summer	F	3	1	0	4
114	Jan Železný	Czechoslovakia; Czech Republic	Athletics	1988–2000	Summer	M	3	1	0	4
145	Tirunesh Dibaba	Ethiopia	Athletics	2004–2016	Summer	F	3	0	3	6
145	Sifan Hassan	Netherlands	Athletics	2020–2024	Summer	F	3	0	3	6
147	Marja-Liisa Kirvesniemi	Finland	Cross-country skiing	1984–1994	Winter	F	3	0	2	5
147	Teddy Riner	France	Judo	2008–2024	Summer	M	3	0	2	5
147	Katja Seizinger	Germany	Alpine skiing	1992–1998	Winter	F	3	0	2	5
150	Johannes Thingnes Bø	Norway	Biathlon	2018–2022	Winter	M	3	0	1	4
150	Pyrros Dimas	Greece	Weightlifting	1992–2004	Summer	M	3	0	1	4
150	Ugo Frigerio	Italy	Athletics	1920–1932	Summer	M	3	0	1	4
150	Natalie Geisenberger	Germany	Luge	2010–2022	Winter	F	3	0	1	4
150	Harrie Lavreysen	Netherlands	Cycling	2020–2024	Summer	M	3	0	1	4
150	Matthias Mayer	Austria	Alpine skiing	2014–2022	Winter	M	3	0	1	4
150	Kjeld Nuis	Netherlands	Speed skating	2018–2026	Winter	M	3	0	1	4
150	Irene Schouten	Netherlands	Speed skating	2018–2022	Winter	F	3	0	1	4
150	Martin Sheridan	United States	Athletics	1904–1908	Summer	M	3	0	1	4
150	Michelle Smith	Ireland	Swimming	1996	Summer	F	3	0	1	4
150	Zou Kai	China	Gymnastics	2008–2012	Summer	M	3	0	1	4
161	Thomas Alsgaard	Norway	Cross-country skiing	1994–2002	Winter	M	3	0	0	3
161	Hjalmar Andersen	Norway	Speed skating	1952	Winter	M	3	0	0	3
161	Kristin Armstrong	United States	Cycling	2008–2016	Summer	F	3	0	0	3
161	Félicia Ballanger	France	Cycling	1996–2000	Summer	F	3	0	0	3
161	Brooke Bennett	United States	Swimming	1996–2000	Summer	F	3	0	0	3
161	Fanny Blankers-Koen	Netherlands	Athletics	1948	Summer	F	3	0	0	3
161	Mike Burton	United States	Swimming	1968–1972	Summer	M	3	0	0	3
161	Cao Yuan	China	Diving	2016–2024	Summer	M	3	0	0	3
161	Ryan Crouser	United States	Athletics	2016–2024	Summer	M	3	0	0	3
161	Betty Cuthbert	Australia	Athletics	1956–1964	Summer	F	3	0	0	3
161	Caeleb Dressel	United States	Swimming	2016–2020	Summer	M	3	0	0	3
161	Tony Estanguet	France	Canoeing	2000–2012	Summer	M	3	0	0	3
161	Archie Hahn	United States	Athletics	1904	Summer	M	3	0	0	3
161	Thorleif Haug	Norway	Cross-country skiing	1924	Winter	M	3	0	0	3
161	Sonja Henie	Norway	Figure skating	1928–1936	Winter	F	3	0	0	3
161	Bud Houser	United States	Athletics	1924–1928	Summer	M	3	0	0	3
161	Vyacheslav Ivanov	Soviet Union	Rowing	1956–1964	Summer	M	3	0	0	3
161	Ivar Johansson	Sweden	Wrestling	1932–1936	Summer	M	3	0	0	3
161	Michael Johnson	United States	Athletics	1992–2000	Summer	M	3	0	0	3
161	Michael Jung	Germany	Equestrian	2012–2024	Summer	M	3	0	0	3
161	Kakhi Kakhiashvili; Akakios Kakiasvilis	Unified Team; Greece	Weightlifting	1992–2000	Summer	M	3	0	0	3
161	Pertti Karppinen	Finland	Rowing	1976–1984	Summer	M	3	0	0	3
161	Tatyana Kazankina	Soviet Union	Athletics	1976–1980	Summer	F	3	0	0	3
161	Jean-Claude Killy	France	Alpine skiing	1968	Winter	M	3	0	0	3
161	Ester Ledecká	Czech Republic	Snowboarding, Alpine skiing	2018–2022	Winter	F	3	0	0	3
161	Eric Lemming	Sweden	Athletics	1908–1912	Summer	M	3	0	0	3
161	James Lightbody	United States	Athletics	1904	Summer	M	3	0	0	3
161	Paul Masson	France	Cycling	1896	Summer	M	3	0	0	3
161	Aleksandr Medved	Soviet Union	Wrestling	1964–1972	Summer	M	3	0	0	3
161	Debbie Meyer	United States	Swimming	1968	Summer	F	3	0	0	3
161	Halil Mutlu	Turkey	Weightlifting	1996–2004	Summer	M	3	0	0	3
161	Nedo Nadi	Italy	Fencing	1912–1920	Summer	M	3	0	0	3
161	Tadahiro Nomura	Japan	Judo	1996–2004	Summer	M	3	0	0	3
161	Jesse Owens	United States	Athletics	1936	Summer	M	3	0	0	3
161	László Papp	Hungary	Boxing	1948–1956	Summer	M	3	0	0	3
161	Marie-José Pérec	France	Athletics	1992–1996	Summer	F	3	0	0	3
161	Toni Sailer	Austria	Alpine skiing	1956	Winter	M	3	0	0	3
161	Buvaisar Saitiev	Russia	Wrestling	1996–2008	Summer	M	3	0	0	3
161	Vladimir Salnikov	Soviet Union	Swimming	1980–1988	Summer	M	3	0	0	3
161	Félix Savón	Cuba	Boxing	1992–2000	Summer	M	3	0	0	3
161	Peter Snell	New Zealand	Athletics	1960–1964	Summer	M	3	0	0	3
161	Teófilo Stevenson	Cuba	Boxing	1972–1980	Summer	M	3	0	0	3
161	Kamil Stoch	Poland	Ski jumping	2014–2018	Winter	M	3	0	0	3
161	Naim Süleymanoğlu	Turkey	Weightlifting	1988–1996	Summer	M	3	0	0	3
161	Áron Szilágyi	Hungary	Fencing	2012–2020	Summer	M	3	0	0	3
161	Lasha Talakhadze	Georgia	Weightlifting	2016–2024	Summer	M	3	0	0	3
161	Nafissatou Thiam	Belgium	Athletics	2016–2024	Summer	F	3	0	0	3
161	Marianne Timmer	Netherlands	Speed skating	1998–2006	Winter	F	3	0	0	3
161	Yvonne van Gennip	Netherlands	Speed skating	1988	Winter	F	3	0	0	3
161	Ulrich Wehling	East Germany	Nordic combined	1972–1980	Winter	M	3	0	0	3
161	Johnny Weissmuller	United States	Swimming	1924–1928	Summer	M	3	0	0	3
161	Carl Westergren	Sweden	Wrestling	1920–1932	Summer	M	3	0	0	3
161	Shaun White	United States	Snowboarding	2006–2018	Winter	M	3	0	0	3
161	Bradley Wiggins	Great Britain	Cycling	2004–2012	Summer	M	3	0	0	3
161	Anita Włodarczyk	Poland	Athletics	2012–2020	Summer	F	3	0	0	3
161	Nikolay Zimyatov	Soviet Union	Cross-country skiing	1980–1984	Winter	M	3	0	0	3

== See also ==
- List of multiple Olympic gold medalists at a single Games
- List of multiple Olympic gold medalists in one event
- List of multiple Olympic medalists
- List of multiple Olympic medalists at a single Games
- List of multiple Olympic medalists in one event
- List of multiple Paralympic gold medalists
- All-time Olympic Games medal table
