= Athletics at the 1904 Summer Olympics – Men's standing high jump =

Men's standing high jump at the Games of the III Olympiad
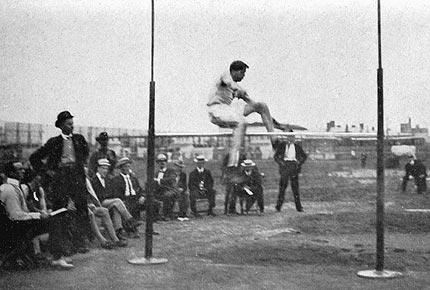
- Ray Ewry during standing high jump competition.
- Venue: Francis Field
- Date: August 31, 1904
- Competitors: 5 from 2 nations
- Winning height: 1.60

Medalists
1st place, gold medalist(s)		Ray Ewry; United States
2nd place, silver medalist(s)		Joseph Stadler; United States
3rd place, bronze medalist(s)		Lawson Robertson; United States

The men's standing high jump was a track and field athletics event held as part of the Athletics at the 1904 Summer Olympics programme. It was the second time the event was held. It was held on August 31, 1904. 5 athletes from 2 nations competed. Ray Ewry continued his dominance of the standing jumps at the Olympics, successfully defending his championships in this one as well as the other two. Joseph Stadler took silver, with Lawson Robertson earning bronze to complete the American sweep (this was only one of the three standing jumps with a non-American competitor, so the sweep here was not guaranteed).

== Background ==
This was the second appearance of the event, which was held four times from 1900 to 1912. Defending champion Ray Ewry of the United States was heavily favored.

Hungary made its debut in the event. The United States made its second appearance, the only nation to have competed previously in the 1900 Games.

== Competition format ==
There was a single round of jumping.

== Records ==
These were the standing world and Olympic records (in metres) prior to the 1904 Summer Olympics.

World record	Ray Ewry (USA)	1.655	Paris, France	16 July 1900
Olympic record	Ray Ewry (USA)	1.655	Paris, France	16 July 1900

No new world or Olympic records were set during the competition.

== Schedule ==
Date	Time	Round
Thursday, 31 August 1904		Final

== Results ==
Rank	Athlete	Nation	Height
1st place, gold medalist(s)	Ray Ewry	United States	1.60
2nd place, silver medalist(s)	Joseph Stadler	United States	1.44
3rd place, bronze medalist(s)	Lawson Robertson	United States	1.44
4	John Biller	United States	1.42
5	Lajos Gönczy	Hungary	1.35
—	Gwynne Evans	United States	DNS
—	John Fuhrer	United States	DNS
—	Frederick Schule	United States	DNS

== Sources ==
- Wudarski, Pawel (1999). "Wyniki Igrzysk Olimpijskich" (in Polish).
