= Athletics at the 1904 Summer Olympics – Men's standing triple jump =

Men's standing triple jump at the Games of the III Olympiad
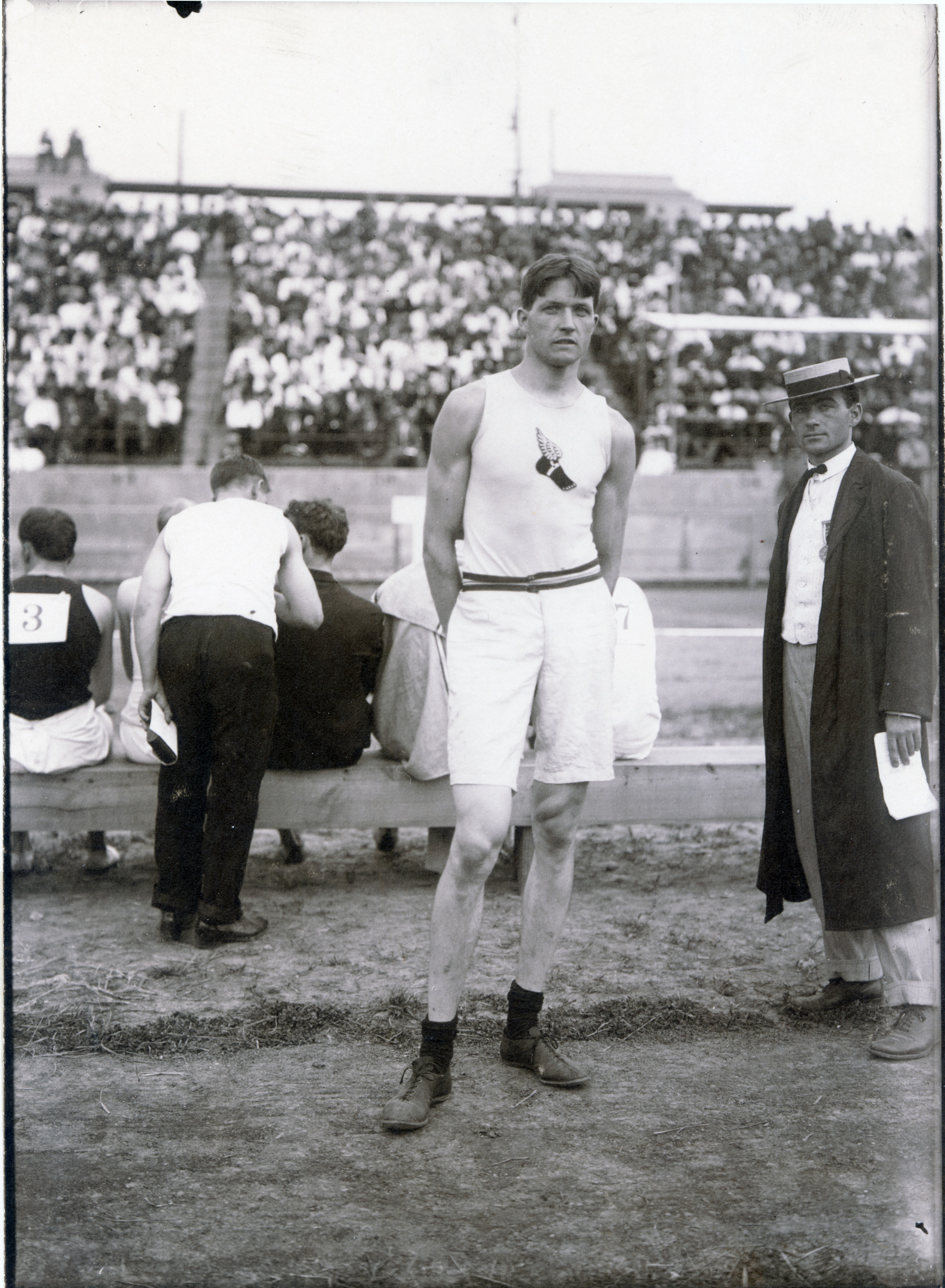
- Ray Ewry
- Venue: Francis Field
- Date: September 3, 1904
- Competitors: 4 from 1 nation
- Winning time: 10.54

Medalists
1st place, gold medalist(s)		Ray Ewry; United States
2nd place, silver medalist(s)		Charles King; United States
3rd place, bronze medalist(s)		Joseph Stadler; United States

The men's standing triple jump was a track and field athletics event held as part of the Athletics at the 1904 Summer Olympics programme. It was the second time the event was held. It was held on September 3, 1904. Four athletes, all from the United States, competed. Ray Ewry continued his dominance of the standing jumps at the Olympics, successfully defending his championships in this one as well as the other two. Charles King took silver, with Joseph Stadler earning bronze. With only Americans competing, the second consecutive sweep was assured; with the event no longer held after these Games, no non-American athlete ever won a medal in the standing triple jump.

== Background ==
This was the second and final appearance of the event, which was held twice in 1900 and 1904 (in contrast to the other standing jumps, which continued to be held in 1908 and 1912). American Ray Ewry, the defending champion, was a heavy favorite.

== Competition format ==
There was a single round of jumping. The rules for the jump are not known; the event was called the "hop, step, and jump" at the time but it appears that jumpers could use three standing long jumps rather than a continuous movement.

== Records ==
These were the standing world and Olympic records (in metres) prior to the 1904 Summer Olympics.

World record		None		
Olympic record	Ray Ewry (USA)	10.58	Paris, France	16 July 1900

No new world or Olympic records were set during the competition.

== Schedule ==
Date	Time	Round
Saturday, 3 September 1904		Final

== Results ==
Rank	Athlete	Nation	Distance
1st place, gold medalist(s)	Ray Ewry	United States	10.54
2nd place, silver medalist(s)	Charles King	United States	10.16
3rd place, bronze medalist(s)	Joseph Stadler	United States	9.60
4	Garrett Serviss	United States	9.53
—	John Biller	United States	DNS
—	Henry Field	United States	DNS
—	John Fuhrer	United States	DNS
—	Thomas Peebles	United States	DNS
—	Lawson Robertson	United States	DNS
—	Frederick Schule	United States	DNS
—	Paul Weinstein	Germany	DNS

== Sources ==
- Wudarski, Pawel (1999). "Wyniki Igrzysk Olimpijskich" (in Polish).
