= Athletics at the 1904 Summer Olympics – Men's standing long jump =

Men's standing long jump at the Games of the III Olympiad
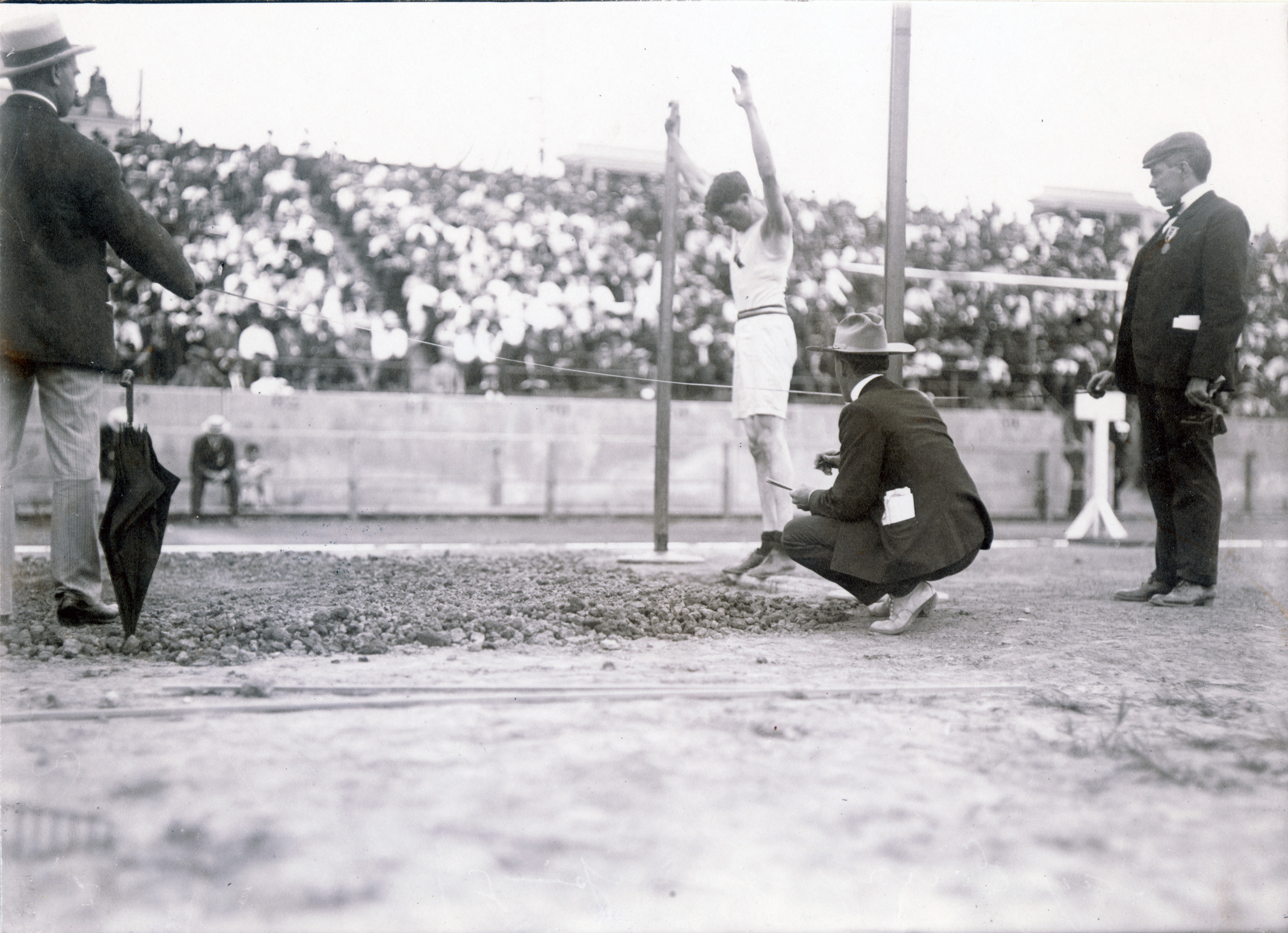
- Ray Ewry competing
- Venue: Francis Field
- Date: August 29, 1904
- Competitors: 4 from 1 nation
- Winning distance: 3.47 WR

Medalists
1st place, gold medalist(s)		Ray Ewry; United States
2nd place, silver medalist(s)		Charles King; United States
3rd place, bronze medalist(s)		John Biller; United States

The men's standing long jump was a track and field athletics event held as part of the athletics at the 1904 Summer Olympics programme. It was the second time the event was held. The competition was held on Monday, August 29, 1904. Four athletes, all from the United States, competed. Ray Ewry continued his dominance of the standing jumps at the Olympics, successfully defending his championships in this one as well as the other two. He also set a new world record. Charles King took silver, with John Biller receiving bronze.

The winning margin was 20 cm which was the only time the men's standing long jump was won by more than 17 cm at the Olympics.

== Background ==
This was the second appearance of the event, which was held four times from 1900 to 1912. American Ray Ewry returned as the defending Olympic champion and world record holder; he was heavily favored in this as well as all the standing jumps.

== Competition format ==
There was a single round of jumping. Jumpers each had four jumps.

== Records ==
These were the standing world and Olympic records (in metres) prior to the 1904 Summer Olympics.

World record	Ray Ewry (USA)	3.45		
Olympic record	Ray Ewry (USA)	3.21	Paris, France	16 July 1900

Ray Ewry set a new world record with 3.47 metres.

== Schedule ==
Date	Time	Round
Monday, 29 August 1904		Final

== Results ==
Rank	Athlete	Nation	1	2	3	4	Distance	Notes
1st place, gold medalist(s)	Ray Ewry	United States	3.40	3.41	3.46	3.47	3.47	WR
2nd place, silver medalist(s)	Charles King	United States	Unknown				3.27	
3rd place, bronze medalist(s)	John Biller	United States	Unknown				3.25	
4	Henry Field	United States	Unknown				3.18	

== Sources ==
- sports-reference.com
- Wudarski, Pawel (1999). "Wyniki Igrzysk Olimpijskich" (in Polish).
