= Standing high jump =

Track and field event

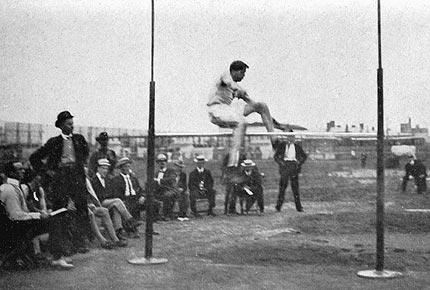
Ray Ewry high-jumps, 1904 Summer Olympics

The standing high jump is an athletics event that was featured in the Olympics from 1900 to 1912. It is performed in the same way as high jump, with the difference being that the athlete has no run-up and must stand still and jump with both feet together.

Ray Ewry was the best of the Olympic era, setting world records for the standing high jump (1.65 m on July 16, 1900). He was also highly successful in the standing long jump and the standing triple jump.

The event previously enjoyed wide competition, featuring on the Olympics athletics programme from 1900 to 1912, as well as at the 1922 and 1926 Women's World Games. The event was contested at the Amateur Athletic Union championships in the United States as an indoor event around the turn of the 20th century. Its popularity waned in the 20th century, although it maintained championship status for a longer period of time in Scandinavian countries.

One of the best results ever is 1.90 m by Swedish athlete Rune Almén in 1980 which at the time was a Swedish record and an unofficial world record. Later he also jumped 1.90 m, which today is the world record. The Norwegian record is 1.82 by Sturle Kalstad in 1983.

== Olympic medalists ==
Games	Gold	Silver	Bronze
1900 Paris	Ray Ewry; United States	Irving Baxter; United States	Lewis Sheldon; United States
1904 St. Louis	Ray Ewry; United States	Joseph Stadler; United States	Lawson Robertson; United States
1908 London	Ray Ewry; United States	John Biller; United States Konstantinos Tsiklitiras; Greece	None awarded
1912 Stockholm	Platt Adams; United States	Benjamin Adams; United States	Konstantinos Tsiklitiras; Greece

== Intercalated Games ==
Games	Gold	Silver	Bronze
1906 Athens	Ray Ewry (USA)	Martin Sheridan (USA) Léon Dupont (BEL) Lawson Robertson (USA)	

== See also ==
- Vertical leap
