= Charles King (athlete) =

American athlete

Medal record

Men's athletics

Representing the United States

Olympic Games
Silver medal – second place	1904 St Louis	Standing long jump
Silver medal – second place	1904 St Louis	Standing triple jump

Conant Meigs King (December 10, 1880 – February 19, 1958), known as Charles King or Con King, was an American athlete who competed mainly in the jumps.

He competed for the United States in the 1904 Summer Olympics held in St Louis, United States. He won silver medals in the standing long jump and the standing triple jump; on both occasions, he was beaten by his teammate Ray Ewry.
