= Léon Dupont =

Belgian high jumper

Medal record

Men's athletics

Representing Belgium

Intercalated Games
Silver medal – second place	1906 Athens	Standing high jump

Léon Dupont (18 May 1881 – 4 October 1956) was a Belgian athlete who mainly competed in the standing high jump. He competed for Belgium in the 1906 Intercalated Games held in Athens, Greece in the standing high jump where he won the silver medal jointly with American pair Lawson Robertson and Martin Sheridan and behind American superstar Ray Ewry.
