= Standing triple jump =

Track and field event

Standing triple jump is an athletics event based on the conventional triple jump with three jumping phases, but without an approach run-up. It is one of three standing variants of track and field jumping events, along with the standing high jump and standing long jump.

While it is no longer an official competitive event, it is still used as a training exercise.

The first phase is a hop from a stand still, which requires the athlete to take-off from a two-footed stand, split in mid air, and land on the preferred foot. The next phase is a long stretched step, landing on the opposite foot. The last phase is the jump, where the athlete lands on both feet. The winner is the competitor who achieves the longest distance on one of the 3 or 6 attempts.

Competitions in standing triple jump are not very common today, but the event was included in the 1900 and 1904 Summer Olympics.

== Olympic medalists ==
Games	Gold	Silver	Bronze
1900 Paris	Ray Ewry (USA)	Irving Baxter (USA)	Robert Garrett (USA)
1904 St. Louis	Ray Ewry (USA)	Charles King (USA)	Joseph Stadler (USA)
