= Standing long jump =

Track and field event

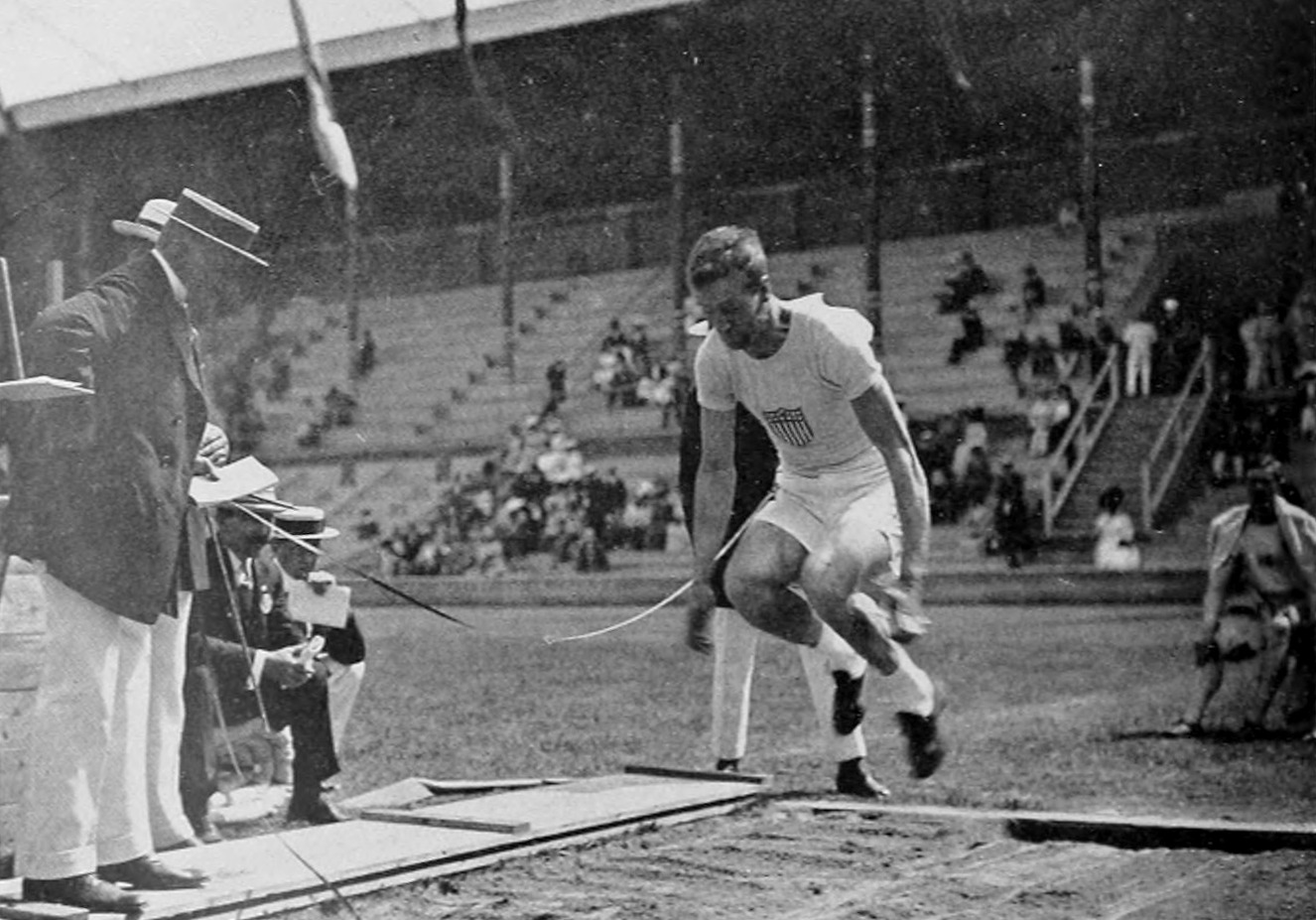
Benjamin Adams during the standing long jump competition at the 1912 Summer Olympics

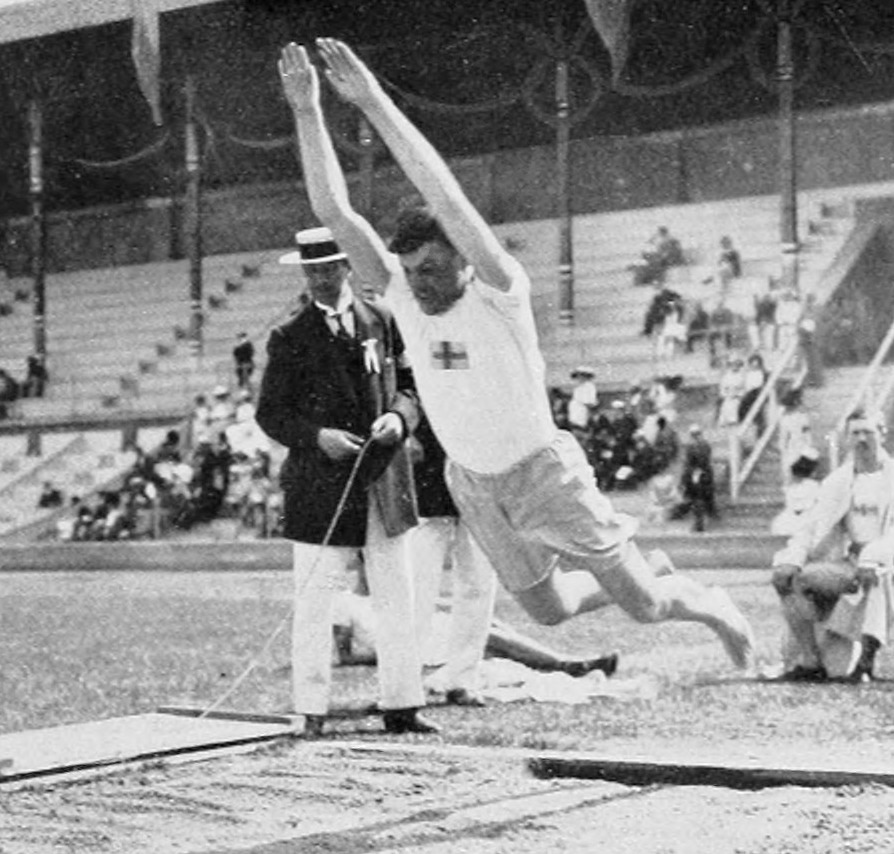
Gustaf Malmsten during the standing long jump competition at the 1912 Summer Olympics

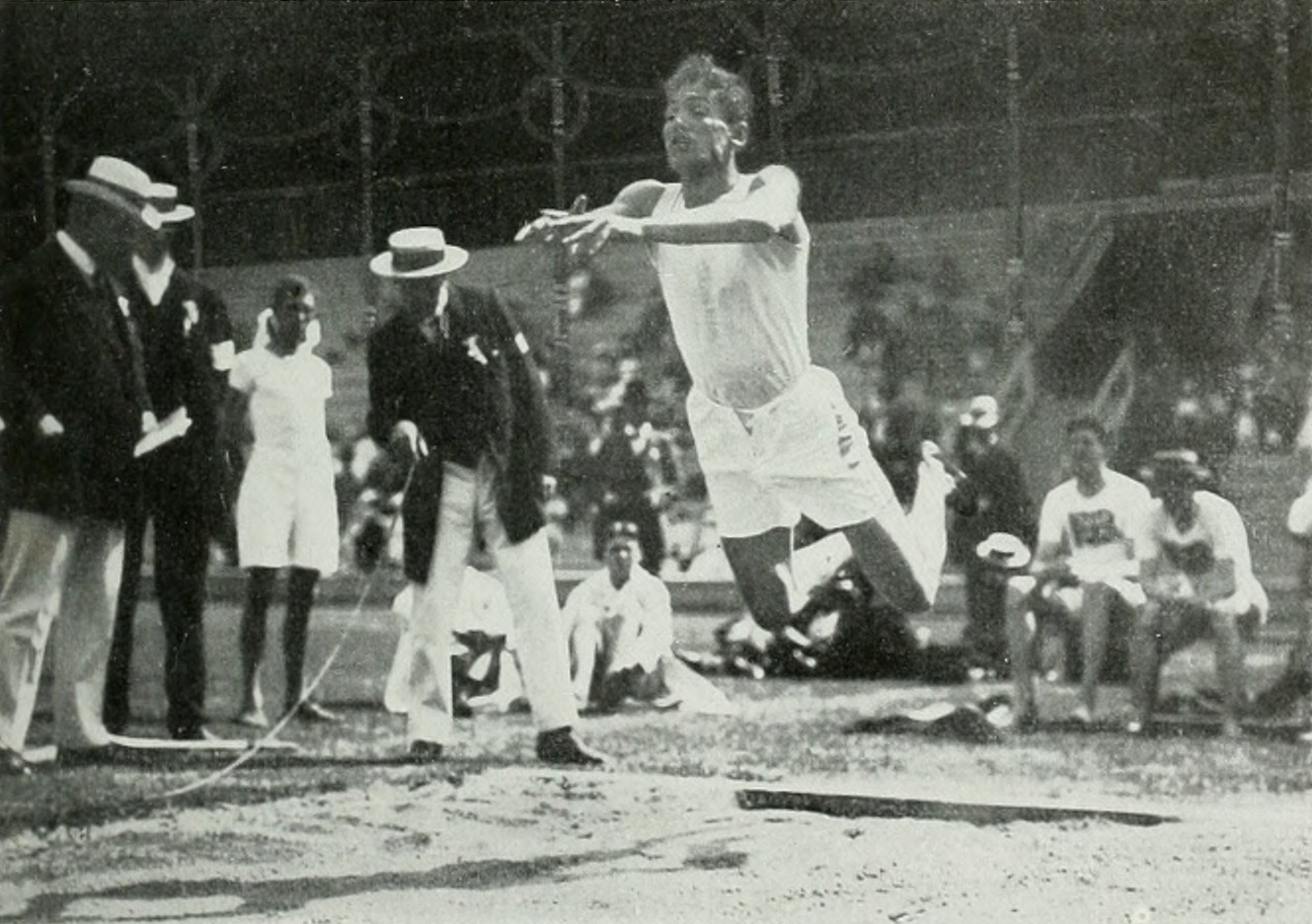
Konstantinos Tsiklitiras during the standing long jump competition at the 1912 Summer Olympics

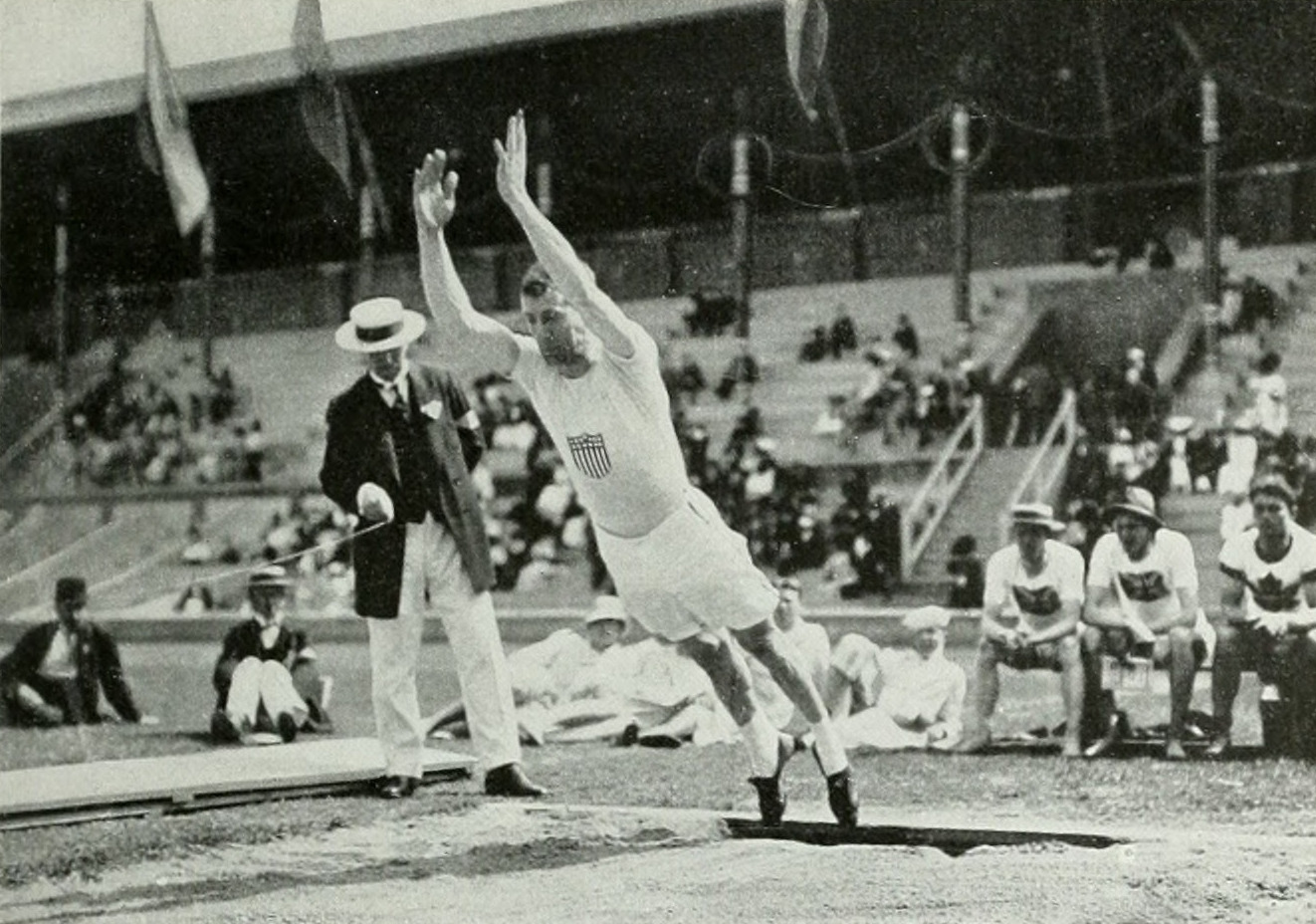
Platt Adams during the standing long jump competition at the 1912 Summer Olympics

The standing long jump, also known as the standing broad jump, is an athletics event. It was an Olympic event until 1912. It is one of three standing variants of track and field jumping events, which also include the standing high jump and standing triple jump.

In performing the standing long jump, the jumper stands at a line marked on the ground with the feet slightly apart. The athlete takes off and lands using both feet, swinging the arms and bending the knees to provide forward drive. The jump must be repeated if the athlete falls back or takes a step at take-off.

In the early part of the nineteenth century the standing long jump was a popular event at highland games and military sports, but very few of these performances were measured. On Friday 8 July 1853 the 93rd Sutherland Highlanders held their annual Highland Games on Chobham Common at which Private J. Forbes cleared 9ft 3in (2.82m) in the standing long jump.

John Scriven of Cambridge University also cleared 9ft 3in (2.82m) at the St John's College Sports at Fenner's cricket ground on Thursday 15 March 1859. Less than a week later, on the first day of the Cambridge University Sports on Monday 21 March, William Howard, of Trinity College, Cambridge, cleared 10ft 2in (3.10m).

At the annual regimental sports of the 24th Regiment, at Shorncliff Camp, near Cheriton in Kent, on Thursday 16 September 1864, three men cleared ten feet. Private Lynch cleared 10ft 6in (3.20m), Private Mullis 10ft 3in (3.12m), and Private Crosey 10ft 1in (3.07m).

Huddersfield Athletic Club held their first Annual Athletics Festival at the Rifle Ground, Trinity Street, Huddersfield, on Saturday 24 June 1865, at which two men, W. N. Haigh and J. W. Rhodes, tied at 10ft 8in (3.25m).

Two months later, on Friday 18 August 1865, at Duns, in the borders of Scotland, around fifteen miles west of Berwick-upon-Tweed, at a meeting of Duns Athletic Club, W. Allen cleared 10ft 9in (3.27m) in the standing long jump and 32ft 2in (9.80m) in the standing triple jump.

Eleven feet was first cleared less than a week later. On Saturday 14 August 1865, Private Rushton (H Troop) cleared exactly 11ft 0in (3.35m) at Aldershot during the Regimental Sports of the 14th Hussars.

Ten months later, on Saturday 24 June 1866, two men cleared eleven feet. At the second Annual Athletic Festival of Huddersfield Athletic Club both M. H. Bradley and J. W. Rhodes cleared 11ft 0in (3.35m) at the Rifle Ground, Trinity Street, Huddersfield.

Exactly one year after that, at the third annual festival of Huddersfield Athletic Club on Saturday 13 July 1867, J. Duckworth, of Haslingden Athletic Club, cleared 11ft 3 1/2in (3.44m).

At Carrick-on-Suir in County Tipperary in southern Ireland, fifteen miles north west of Waterford, on Monday 1 April 1872, Maurice Davin, a farmer who later became the first President of the Gaelic Athletic Association (GAA), cleared 11ft 6in (3.50m). He also won the 56lb weight throw at 26ft 4in (8.02m), the shot put (17lb) with 38ft 8in (11.78m), the hammer (16lb) 98ft 0in (29.88m), the standing triple jump 32ft 7in (9.93m), and had a walkover in the high jump.

On Saturday 13 May 1876, at the Chuckery Ground, Walsall, during the Second Annual Athletic Sports of Walsall Cricket & Football Club, A. B. Lindop jumped 11ft 10in (3.60m).

Ray Ewry set the first world record for the standing long jump at 3.47 m (11 ft 4 1/2 in) on September 3, 1904. The current unofficial record is held by Byron Jones, who recorded a jump of 3.73 m (12 ft 2 3/4 in) at the NFL Combine on February 23, 2015, beating the official world-record jump distance of 3.71 m (12 ft 2 in) set by Norwegian shot putter Arne Tvervaag from Ringerike FIK Sportclub in 1968, in a different setting with different controls.

France held national championships at standing long jump and standing high jump for men from 1905 to 1920, and for women from 1917 to 1926. Their first standing long jump champions were Henri Jardin (Racing Club de France) 3.04m (9ft 11 3/4in), and Suzanne Liebrard (Fémina Sports) 2.215m (7ft 3in).

When indoor arenas were built, the standing long jump began to disappear as an event. Today, Norway is the only country where the standing long jump is a national championship event. The Norwegian Championships in Standing Jumps (long jump and high jump) has been held at the Norwegian Indoor Athletics Championships every winter since 1995.

The standing long jump is also one of the events at the NFL Combine, it was one of the standardized test events as part of the President's Award on Physical Fitness, as well as the physical fitness test that officer cadets must complete at the Royal Military College of Canada and the United States Air Force Academy. In the Brazilian police forces, a minimum performance in a standing long jump test is required to join the Federal Police (2.14 m for men 1.66 m for women) and the Federal Highway Police (2.00 m for men 1.60 m for women).

== Olympic medalists ==
Games	Gold	Silver	Bronze
1900 Paris	Ray Ewry; United States	Irving Baxter; United States	Emile Torcheboeuf; France
1904 St. Louis	Ray Ewry; United States	Charles King; United States	John Biller; United States
1908 London	Ray Ewry; United States	Konstantinos Tsiklitiras; Greece	Martin Sheridan; United States
1912 Stockholm	Konstantinos Tsiklitiras; Greece	Platt Adams; United States	Benjamin Adams; United States

== Intercalated Games ==
Games	Gold	Silver	Bronze
1906 Athens	Ray Ewry (USA)	Martin Sheridan (USA)	Lawson Robertson (USA)
