= Joseph Stadler =

American athlete

Olympic medal record

Men's athletics

Representing the United States
Silver medal – second place	1904 St Louis	Standing high jump
Bronze medal – third place	1904 St Louis	Standing triple jump

Joseph Francis Stadler (June 12, 1880 – February 25, 1950) was an American athlete who competed mainly in the standing high jump.

He competed for the United States in the 1904 Summer Olympics held in St Louis, United States in the standing high jump where he won the silver medal. He also won a bronze medal in the standing triple jump in both events he finished behind Ray Ewry.
