= Lawson Robertson =

American athlete and coach (1883–1951)

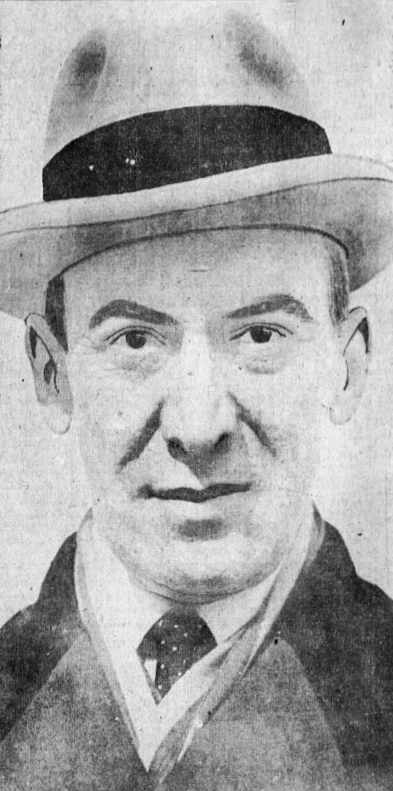
- Robertson circa 1927

Personal information
- Born: September 23, 1883 Aberdeen, Scotland
- Died: January 22, 1951 (aged 67) Philadelphia, Pennsylvania, U.S.
- Occupations: Head Track Coach; Irish-Amer. Club '09-16; U of Penn '16-47; US Olympics '24-36
- Height: 183 cm (6 ft 0 in)
- Weight: 68 kg (150 lb) (Olympics)
- Spouse: Mary Helen Teevan
- Children: 3 sons, 1 daughter
Medal record
Men's athletics
Representing the United States
Olympic Games
Bronze medal – third place	1904 St. Louis	Standing high jump
Intercalated Games
Silver medal – second place	1906 Athens	Standing high jump
Bronze medal – third place	1906 Athens	Standing long jump

Lawson N. "Robbie" Robertson (September 23, 1883 – January 22, 1951) was considered one of the more accomplished American track coaches of the first half of the twentieth century. From 1904 to 1936, he was with the American team at every Olympics with the exception of 1916 when the Olympics were cancelled due to WWI. He coached Track and Field for the Irish-American Athletic Club in Queens, New York from 1909–16, and then for the University of Pennsylvania from 1916-47. He was U.S. Olympic Assistant Track coach in 1912 and 1920 and was head coach for the American Track and Field Team in four Olympics from 1924-36.

In his youth, he was an Olympic competitor in track and field in 1904 and 1908. At age 21, he won a bronze medal in the Standing high jump as a competitor with the U.S. Olympic Team at the 1904 Summer Olympics in St. Louis, and two years later won a Silver and a Bronze medal at the 1906 Intercalated Games in Athens. He also competed in the 1908 Summer Olympics in London, but did not medal.

== Early life ==
Lawson was born in Alford, Aberdeen, Scotland on September 23, 1883, to Gordon Hunt Robertson and Elisabeth Robertson, and came to New York around the age of 9 in 1892, where he attended Boys High School in Brooklyn, though he did not participate in athletics. It was not until he was out of school around 1901, that he began to compete in Track events. He began his career as an athlete in New York City, winning many championships for the YMCA, and afterwards for the New York Athletic Club. Versatile as a Track athlete, he was particularly proficient in the dashes, pole vault, high jump, shot put, half-mile and quarter-mile races.

Robertson won the all-around championship for the Brooklyn YMCA in 1901. In 1904, he won the National 100 yard title, won the 300 yard national title in 1906 and 1908, and won both the 150 and 300 yard titles in 1907. Later, in April 1909, he held the record of 11 seconds for the 100 yard three-legged race with his friend, fellow 1904 Track Olympian and Brooklynite Harry Hillman.

== Athletic career ==
=== 1904 Olympics ===
In August 1904, he won his only Olympic medal, a bronze, in the Standing high jump competition with a jump of 1.44 meters or around 4.724 feet in the Olympics in St. Louis. In the 100 metres event he finished sixth. He also participated in the 60 metres competition where he was eliminated in the first round.

=== 1906 Intercalated Games ===
Two years later at the Intercalated Games of 1906 he won the silver medal in the standing high jump event and the bronze medal in the standing long jump competition. For many years, newspapers and the press considered the Intercalated games in Athens an intermediate Olympic Games, though they were later rejected by the Olympic committee as not being fully representative of the Olympics. In the 100 metres event he finished fifth and in the pentathlon contest he finished sixth. He also participated in the 400 metres competition but did not start in the repechage.

=== 1908 Olympics ===
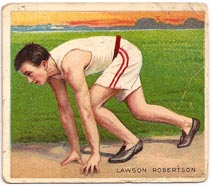
Robertson 1910 Mecca Card

According to his 1910 trading card, Lawson "will go down in athletic history as one of the greatest sprinters of the cinder path." In the 100 metres competition at the 1908 Olympics, Robertson won his first round heat with a time of 11.4 seconds to advance to the semifinals. There, he lost a close race to countryman Nathaniel Cartmell, both clocking at 11.2 seconds and Cartmell winning by about a foot. The loss to Cartmell eliminated Robertson from advancing to the final. On the same day as his semifinal loss in the 100 meters, Robertson was eliminated in the preliminary heats of the 200 metres with a second-place finish in his heat. His time was 23.0 seconds, 0.2 slower than the winner's. He also participated again in the standing high jump competition but his result is unknown.

=== Burn injury ===
On November 28, 1909, Robertson was badly burned in an accident at Celtic Park, in Queens, New York when a ladle of hot lead exploded in his face. Robertson was preparing to pour the molten lead for a 42 pounds (19.05 kg) shot which was to be used in the shot put by Martin Sheridan and John Flanagan at the annual field day of the Second Regiment of the Irish Volunteers. The shot was determined to be a few ounces under weight, so a hole was bored in it and the lead was poured inside to bring the weight to the required mark. Robertson was standing over the ladle when some water dropped into the lead, causing an explosion which burned Robertson's face and neck. "Fortunately he had his eyes close tightly, and they were not injured. The flesh about his eyes and face was burned and the lead burned his clothes." After Robertson was rushed to a doctor, the Irish Whales of the Irish American Athletic Club proceeded with the competition, and Martin Sheridan set a world's record with the very same weight, putting the shot 27 ft 0.5 in (8.24 m), three and half inches further than the long-standing record of fellow Irishman James Mitchell.

== Coaching career ==
Robertson (right) in three-legged race with Harry Hillman (left), circa 1909

After the height of his success as a track and field athlete, Robertson competed for the New York Athletic Club, and coached there in 1909, later coaching at Brooklyn College and New York University.

Robertson was better known for his appointment as a coach of the Irish-American Athletic club in Queens, New York in 1909, which had athletes who held many records. Although he enjoyed moderate success as an athlete, Robertson is best known for his coaching career, regarded as one of the most accomplished American track coaches of the first half of the twentieth century.

Robertson had the distinction of introducing the javelin throw to U.S. track and field after the Athens Olympics in 1906. In WWI, he briefly served as a Lieutenant in the Air Service.

=== University of Pennsylvania ===
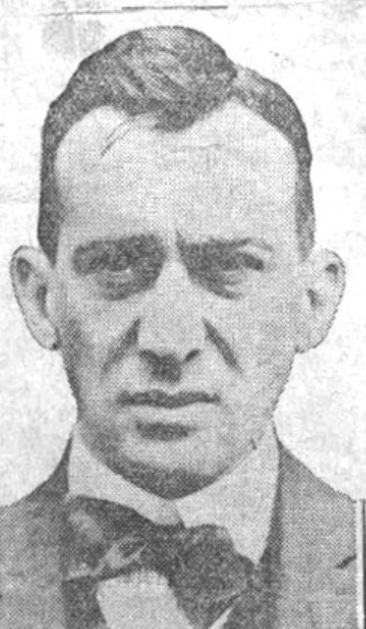
Robinson in 1916

He remained as coach of the Irish-American club of Queens, NY until February 1916 when he accepted an appointment at the University of Pennsylvania in Philadelphia. His 31 exceptional years of service as a coach at Penn would define his long coaching career and last until July 1947 when he retired. His 1923, '24, '30, and '31 Penn teams won the Indoor Intercollegiates, and his 1920 team won the Outdoor Intercollegiates. Robertson was well-versed in teaching conditioning which he coached for the University of Pennsylvania Football Team. He gained knowledge of tough conditioning training when he spent nine years in the National Guard in New York, including time with Company E of the old 13th Regiment of Brooklyn, known as the athletic company of the regiment.

==== Penn track athletes coached ====
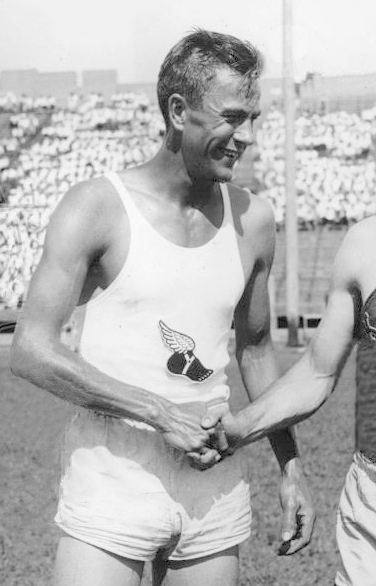
Sprinter Gene Venzke in 1937

His more exceptional Penn Track athletes included 1912 Olympic Gold Medalist runner Ted Meredith, 1932 Olympic Gold medalist in the 400 metre run and relay Bill Carr, and the 1936 1500 meter World Record sprinter Gene Venzke. Other record holders included 1912 Hammer Throw Olympic Gold medalist Matt McGrath who belonged to the Irish-American and New York Athletic Clubs, Dan Ahern, and Italian runner Emilio Lunghi who ran briefly with the Irish-American Club around 1909. He coached nearly a dozen record holders and exceptional track athletes at Penn. Robertson once said,"speed is born in a runner and endurance can be developed", and he stressed the importance of a quality diet and sufficient rest. Robertson was probably best known for getting the most out of the athletes he coached, and for his foresight.

=== U.S. Olympic track coach ===
Though not always credited as an assistant coach in that year, in 1912 when Mike Murphy, the coach of the U.S. Olympic track & field team fell ill, Robertson, in his capacity as assistant coach, became the de facto coach of the team, which garnered 16 of a possible 32 track & field gold medals. He also served as an assistant Olympic Track and Field coach in 1920.

==== Head Olympic Track and Field Coach ====
As a capstone to his coaching career in Track and Field, Robinson served as the head coach for the American Track and Field Team in four Olympics from 1924-36 after serving as an assistant coach in 1912 and 1920. In 1928, at the Olympic Games in Amsterdam, reflecting on the controversial 1908 Olympics, Robertson said: "Probably England was not as charitably inclined toward the American champions as she might have been, and it is equally true that the victorious Americans were not as modest as they should have been."

Robertson became embroiled in controversy in the 1936 Berlin Olympics, the last year he was head coach, when his last-minute decision to pull Sam Stoller and Marty Glickman, the only two Jews on the U.S. track team, led to widespread speculation that U.S. Olympic Committee chairman Avery Brundage had ordered the move to avoid further embarrassment to Adolf Hitler should two American Jews win gold medals. It could be noted that Robertson was not supportive of the Hitler regime after returning to American after the 1936 Olympics, and warned Americans that Germany's arms escalation could be a threat to America and the world. At least two of his three sons became WWII era veterans, Charles A., a Navy dive-bomber pilot who was shot down over the Philippine Sea, Lawson Jr., a Sergeant in the Army Engineers, and George who was in Naval Radar School in Maryland in September 1945 shortly after the war. Marty Glickman and others believed the decision to pull him and Stoller was more the decision of Olympic Coach Dean Cromwell than Robertson. Robertson coached both Black and Jewish Olympians, including the exceptional black Olympian Jessie Owens in 1936, and Jewish Olympian Louis Clarke, a gold medalist in the 400 meter relay in the 1924 Paris Olympics.

=== Death and retirement ===
Robertson retired from coaching in July 1947 due to declining health. He died in Philadelphia on January 22, 1951, after a two-month illness and was buried in West Laurel Hill Cemetery in Bala Cynwyd, twenty miles Northwest of Philadelphia. He was survived by his wife Mary Helen, and sons George and Lawson Jr., a daughter Dorothy, and three sisters. Another son, Charles Alexander, a post-humous Navy Cross recipient, died in WWII when the Japanese shot down his dive bomber in the Philippine Sea in 1944.

=== Honors ===
A plaque in the name of Lawson "Robbie" Robertson was erected at Franklin Field at the University of Pennsylvania in 1953, and he is a member of the University of Pennsylvania Athletics Hall of Fame. He was one of the few coaches honored by being selected for the Helms Hall of Fame in Los Angeles.

== Portrayals in film ==
- He is portrayed by Tony Curran in the 2016 biographical sports film Race.
