= John Biller =

American athlete (1877–1934)

Olympic medal record

Men's athletics

Representing the United States
Silver medal – second place	1908 London	Standing high jump
Bronze medal – third place	1904 St Louis	Standing long jump

John Arthur Biller (November 14, 1877 in Newark, New Jersey – March 26, 1934 in Manhattan, New York) was an American athlete who competed mainly in standing jumps.

He competed for the United States in the 1904 Summer Olympics held in St Louis, United States in the standing long jump where he won the bronze medal. In the standing high jump he was 4th, and he also was 5th in the discus throw. Four years later he medalled at the Olympics for a second time, this time he won the silver medal for the standing high jump and was 4th in the standing long jump in the 1908 Summer Olympics held in London, Great Britain.
