= Ray Ewry =

American track and field athlete

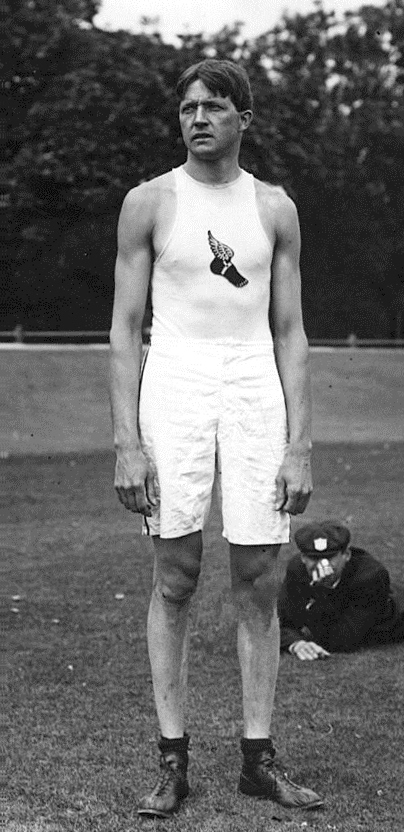
- Ewry at the 1908 Olympics

Personal information
- Full name: Raymond Clarence Ewry
- Born: October 14, 1873 Lafayette, Indiana, U.S.
- Died: September 29, 1937 (aged 63) Long Island, New York, U.S.
- Education: Purdue University
- Height: 6 ft 1 in (1.85 m)
- Weight: 174 lb (79 kg)

Sport
- Sport: Athletics
- Events: standing high, long, and triple jump
- Club: Purdue Boilermakers, West Lafayette, Indiana; NYAC, New York

Achievements and titles
- Personal bests: sHJ – 1.675 m (1900) sLJ – 3.47 m (1904) sTJ – 10.86 m (1901)
Medal record
Men's athletics
Representing the United States
Olympic Games
Gold medal – first place	1900 Paris	Standing long jump
Gold medal – first place	1900 Paris	Standing high jump
Gold medal – first place	1900 Paris	Standing triple jump
Gold medal – first place	1904 St. Louis	Standing long jump
Gold medal – first place	1904 St. Louis	Standing high jump
Gold medal – first place	1904 St. Louis	Standing triple jump
Gold medal – first place	1908 London	Standing long jump
Gold medal – first place	1908 London	Standing high jump
Intercalated Games
Gold medal – first place	1906 Athens	Standing long jump
Gold medal – first place	1906 Athens	Standing high jump

Raymond Clarence Ewry (October 14, 1873 – September 29, 1937) was an American track and field athlete who won eight gold medals at the Olympic Games and two gold medals at the Intercalated Games (1906 in Athens). This puts him among the most successful Olympians of all time.

== Personal life and early career ==
Ewry was born in Lafayette, Indiana, and contracted polio as a young boy. In his childhood, he used a wheelchair, and it was feared that he might become paralysed for life.

However, Ewry did his own exercises and overcame his illness. Ewry attended Purdue University in 1890–1897, where he captained the track and field team, played American football, and became a member of Sigma Nu fraternity. After receiving a graduate degree in mechanical engineering at Purdue, he moved to New York. There he worked as a hydraulics engineer and became a member of the New York Athletic Club. He specialized in now defunct events, the standing jumps: the standing high jump, the standing long jump and the standing triple jump. These events were similar to their modern, normal versions but the athlete jumped without a run-up.

== Career ==
Ewry proved to be the best standing jumper in the world. At his first Olympics, held in Paris (1900), he won gold medals in all three standing jumps. Incidentally, all three finals were held on the same day (July 16).

At the 1904 Summer Olympics, Ewry successfully defended all three of his titles. The standing triple jump event was discontinued after those Olympics, but Ewry continued to dominate the two remaining standing jump events at both the 1906 Intercalated Games and 1908 Games, thus bringing his total to 10 Olympic gold titles including two from the Intercalated Games, the highest number achieved until 2008. The 1906 Intercalated Games are currently not officially recognised by the IOC, although they were organized as an Olympic event by the IOC. Even if the 1906 games are removed from his totals, he stands (as of 2008) as the 12th most successful Olympian of all time in terms of total individual medals and second most successful in terms of individual gold medals. The standing jumping events were no longer held in the Olympics after 1912.

Ewry's superiority is also displayed by the fact that his world record in the standing long jump (3.47 m or 11 ft 5 in) was still standing when the event was discontinued internationally in the 1930s. In 1974 he was inducted into the National Track and Field Hall of Fame and in 1983 into the United States Olympic Hall of Fame.

== Longstanding records for Olympic medals ==
Ewry's eight Olympic gold medals in individual events (i.e. non-relay), although now second to Michael Phelps's 13, was the record, all alone, for 100 years and 23 days—from July 23, 1908, until Phelps won his eighth on August 15, 2008 (followed by his ninth on August 16).

His record of winning three gold medals in one event, although it had subsequently been equaled by seven other athletes, was not surpassed for 60 years—from 1908 until Al Oerter won his fourth gold (discus throw) in 1968, a feat equaled by Carl Lewis when he won his fourth (long jump) in 1996, Michael Phelps when he won his fourth (200 meter individual medley) in 2016, and by Kaori Icho when she won her fourth consecutive gold in women's wrestling in 2016.

Finally, his record of three gold medals in two events, set in July 1908 (standing long jump on July 20 and standing high jump on July 23) was not surpassed for 108 years—until in 2016 Michael Phelps won his third gold medal in the 200-meter butterfly to win three gold medals in three events (200-meter individual medley, 100-meter butterfly, and 200-meter butterfly). Phelps equaled Ewry's record in 2012, when he won his third gold in the 100 meter butterfly on August 3, having won his third in the 200-meter individual medley on August 2.

Ewry has the most Olympic gold medals with a 100% record—8 individual golds.

== Bibliography ==
- Genty, Clement (2021). RAY EWRY (1873-1937) Dix fois champion olympique du saut sans élan. L'Harmattan. ISBN 978-2-343-23212-6.

== See also ==
- List of multiple Olympic gold medalists
- List of multiple Olympic gold medalists in one event
- List of multiple Summer Olympic medalists

Records
Preceded by (Germany) Hermann Weingärtner	Most career Olympic medals 1908–1920	Succeeded by (United States) Carl Osburn
Preceded by (United States) Robert Garrett	Most career Olympic medals 1908–1920	Succeeded by (United States) Carl Osburn
