= Athletics at the Far Eastern Championship Games =

Athletics was one of the sports at the biennial Far Eastern Championship Games. Athletics competitions were held at every one of the ten editions of the games, which existed between 1913 and 1934. This represented the first time that a regular major international athletics competition occurred between Asian nations. It was later succeeded by athletics at the Asian Games, which began in 1951.

At the start of the 20th century, the Philippines was initially the most developed nation in track and field sports given its close ties to the United States through its Insular Government, which ruled the country as a territory. As the head of the Philippine Amateur Athletic Federation and physical director of the national YMCA branch, Elwood Brown had set about developing American sports in the Philippines. He was central to the creation of the Far Eastern Athletic Association and track and field was a main aspect of the Far Eastern Championship Games from the inaugural edition.

Correspondingly, in the first half of the competition's history, the Philippines was the most dominant nation in the athletics programme, going unbeaten in the first five editions. Japan's development in Western track and field coincided with the launch of the games, with the country holding its first national championships for the sport in 1913. Developing through similar means of engagement with the YMCA sports programme in the country, the country became the dominant force in athletics in the mid-1920s and won four of the last five championship titles in the sport. Outside the Western-defined track events, Japan was consistently dominant in the middle- and long-distance running events from the beginning of the competition, owing to its tradition of distance running including the Kanto 10-mile road race (held near Narita since the late 19th century) and its well-developed ekiden foot messenger system. Chinese track and field athletes, led by their local YMCA athletic group, also developed over the period that the competition was held, but as the 20th century progressed they quickly fell behind the standard set by Japan and the Philippines; China began to emerge as a regional power in athletics in the 1970s.

== Editions ==
Games	Year	Host city	Host country	Events	Championship winner
1	1913	Manila	Philippines	17	Philippines
2	1915	Shanghai	China	17	Philippines
3	1917	Tokyo	Japan	18	Philippines
4	1919	Manila	Philippines	18	Philippines
5	1921	Shanghai	China	18	Philippines
6	1923	Osaka	Japan	19	Japan
7	1925	Manila	Philippines	19	Philippines
8	1927	Shanghai	China	19	Japan
9	1930	Tokyo	Japan	19	Japan
10	1934	Manila	Philippines	19	Japan

== Events ==
Over the 21-year history of the competition, only men's athletics events were included. For the first six editions of the competition (1913 to 1923), athletics track events were contested over imperial distances. These were changed to metric distances from 1925 onwards, in line with international and Olympic standards. The number of events contested stayed relatively stable and (excluding distance variations in running events) the only additions were the javelin throw in 1917 and the triple jump in 1923 – both events where Japanese athletes were dominant. The events programme roughly aligned with that of the Olympics, with notable differences being the absence of marathon, steeplechase, racewalking, and hammer throw events.

Event chronology
Event	1913	1915	1917	1919	1921	1923	1925	1927	1930	1934	Games
100 yards/100 metres	y	y	y	y	y	y	m	m	m	m	10
220 yards/200 metres straight^{[nb1]}	y	y	y	y	y	y	m	m	m	m	10
440 yards/400 metres	y	y	y	y	y	y	m	m	m	m	10
880 yards/800 metres	y	y	y	y	y	y	m	m	m	m	10
Mile run/1500 metres	y	y	y	y	y	y	m	m	m	m	10
Long-distance road race	5 mi	8 mi	–	5 mi	–	–	–	–	–	–	3
Long-distance track race	–	–	10 mi	–	5 mi	5 mi	–	–	–	–	3
10,000 metres	–	–	–	–	–	–	m	m	m	m	4
120 yards/110 metres hurdles	y	y	y	y	y	y	m	m	m	m	10
220 yards/200 metres hurdles straight	y	y	y	y	y	y	m	m	m	–	9
400 metres hurdles	–	–	–	–	–	–	–	–	–	m	1
4×100 metres relay	–	–	–	–	–	–	–	–	–	m	1
4×220 yards/4×200 metres relay	y	y	y	y	y	y	m	m	m	–	9
4×440 yards/4×400 metres relay	y	y	y	y	y	y	m	m	m	m	10
Pole vault	X	X	X	X	X	X	X	X	X	X	10
High jump	X	X	X	X	X	X	X	X	X	X	10
Long jump	X	X	X	X	X	X	X	X	X	X	10
Triple jump	–	–	–	–	–	X	X	X	X	X	5
Shot put^{[nb2]}	X	X	X	X	X	X	X	X	X	X	10
Discus throw	X	X	X	X	X	X	X	X	X	X	10
Javelin throw	–	–	X	X	X	X	X	X	X	X	8
Pentathlon^{[nb3]}	X	X	X	X	X	X	X	X	X	X	10
Decathlon^{[nb3]}	X	X	X	X	X	X	X	X	X	X	10

- ^{nb1} The 1934 edition of the 200 metres was held in a "turn" format, as opposed to the usual straight format
- ^{nb2} Between 1921 and 1930 a lighter than international standard implement was used in the shot put.
- ^{nb3} A variety of combined track and field events points scoring methods were used over the history of the competition.

== Multiple champions ==
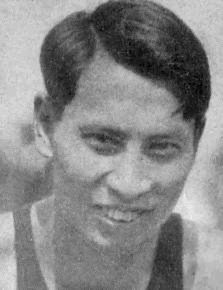
Mikio Oda of Japan won six titles in horizontal jumps and became the first Asian Olympic champion in 1928.

Given that the games were held during a period when athletics was a developing sport in the three participating nations, several athletes were dominant in their events at the competition. The event also saw the development of some of the region's athletes into international standard competitors. Foremost of these was Japanese athlete Mikio Oda, who became Asia's first ever Olympic gold medallist at the 1928 Amsterdam Olympics by winning the triple jump. Three-time Far Eastern high jump champion Simeon Toribio became the first Olympic medallist for the Philippines at the 1932 Los Angeles Olympics. Takayoshi Yoshioka, a three-time Far Eastern sprint champion, equalled the men's 100 metres world record in 1935 – the first and so far only Asian athlete to achieve that feat in the event. Kosaku Sumiyoshi won the Far Eastern javelin title three times and was an Olympic finalist in 1932.

Fortunato Catalon was the most successful competitor in the athletics section of the Far Eastern Championship Games. He won nine individual sprint titles from 1917–1925, including four consecutive sprint doubles in the 100-yard dash and 220-yard dash. His compatriots Genaro Saavedra and Regino Ylanan—each with four titles to their name—were the only athletes other than Catalon and Oda to claim more than three individual titles. Ylanan had a lasting legacy in Filipino sport through the creation of the National Collegiate Athletic Association in the Philippines which, like its American equivalent, remains the organiser for national level college sports. Katsuo Okazaki was the competition's most successful middle-distance runner (having won two titles in the mile run and one in the 880-yard run) and went on to greater success outside of the field of sport by serving as Minister for Foreign Affairs for Japan in the 1950s and a United Nations delegate in the 1960s.

Athletes with three or more individual titles
Athlete	Titles	Nation	Event(s)	Period
Fortunato Catalon	9	Philippines	100 yd (4), 100 m (1), 200 yd (4)	1917–1925
Mikio Oda	7	Japan	Long jump (2), triple jump (4), decathlon	1923–1930
Regino Ylanan	4	Philippines	Shot put (2), discus throw, pentathlon	1913–1915
Genaro Saavedra	4	Philippines	100 yards, high jump, pole vault, decathlon	1915
Alejo Alvarez	3	Philippines	Shot put (2), discus throw	1917–1919
Katsuo Okazaki	3	Japan	880 yd (1), mile run (2)	1921–1923
Antonio Alo	3	Philippines	Pole vault	1919–1925
Juan Taduran	3	Philippines	Decathlon	1921–1925
Generoso Rabaya	3	Philippines	110 m hurdles (2), shot put	1925–1927
Kosaku Sumiyoshi	3	Japan	Javelin throw (2), pentathlon	1927–1930
Simeon Toribio	3	Philippines	High jump	1927–1934
Takayoshi Yoshioka	3	Japan	100 m (1), 200 m (2)	1930–1934

== Olympic medallists ==
The competition was the first venue for international athletics between specifically Asian nations. As a result, the games was the place where Asia's top international athletes of the period first found success. Nine of these athletes went on to claim Asia's first Olympic athletics medals.

Two Filipinos, Simeon Toribio and Miguel White, were Far Eastern champions that later won Olympic bronze medals, Toribio in the high jump and White in the 400 metres hurdles. As of 2015, these remain the only athletes from that nation to have reached the Olympic podium in athletics competition.

A total of seven Far Eastern Championship Games athletes went on to win athletics medals for Japan at the Olympics. The first of these was Mikio Oda – Asia's first Olympic champion in 1928. Chuhei Nambu succeeded him to that honour four years later and Kenkichi Oshima also reached the Olympic podium that year; both had been minor medallists in the Far Eastern triple jump behind Oda. Naoto Tajima was a bronze medallist behind Oshima at the 1934 Far Eastern Championship Games but went on to become the third successive Olympic triple jump champion for Japan two years later. The 1934 runner-up Masao Harada was also the Olympic runner-up behind Tajima. Both Tajima and Nambu also won Olympic long jump medals in the 1930s. Outside of the horizontal jumps, Japanese athletes of the period also had success in the Olympic pole vault. The 1930 Far Eastern champion Shuhei Nishida was twice Olympic runner-up in 1932 then 1936. Sueo Oe, the man who succeeded him as Far Eastern gold medallist, was also on the Olympic podium in 1936.

== Medals (1913–1934) ==
Rank	Nation	Gold	Silver	Bronze	Total
1	Beiyang China	118	133	135	386
2	Nationalist China	110	116	97	323
3	Philippines	89	72	79	240
4	Japan	77	81	60	218
5	Thailand	51	26	40	117
6	North Borneo	31	17	15	63
7	Dutch East Indies	27	16	24	67
8	India	15	13	17	45
9	Khmer Republic	12	11	17	40
10	Federated Malay States	11	12	17	40
11	Hong Kong	11	7	12	30
12	Burma	8	12	15	35
13	Macau	3	17	20	40
Totals (13 entries)		563	533	548	1,644

== See also ==
- List of international athletics championships and games
