= Fortunato Catalon =

Filipino sprinter

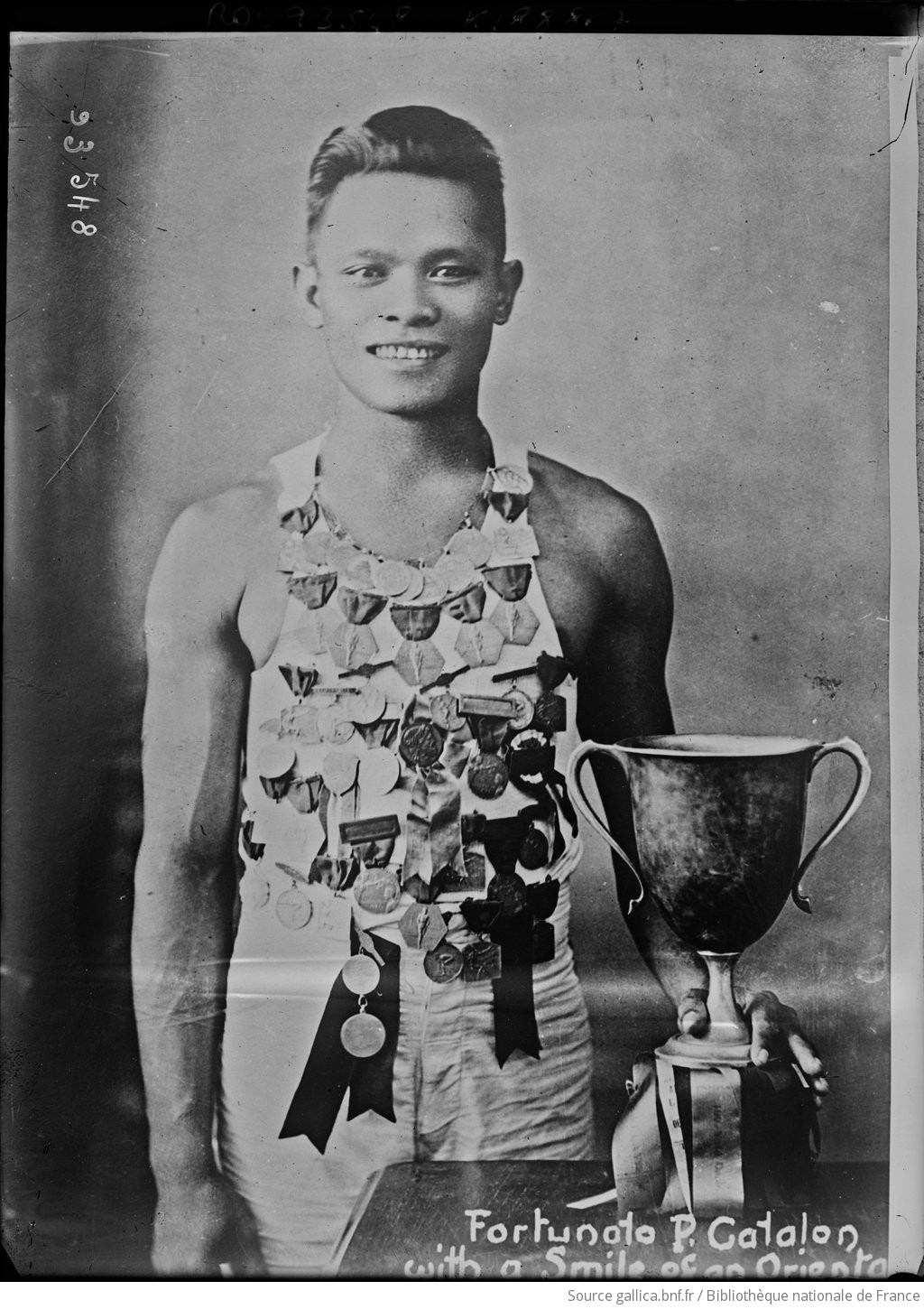
- Catalon ca. 1924. He was the most bemedalled individual athlete at the Far Eastern Championship Games

Personal information
- Nicknames: The Cat, the Orient's Fastest Human
- Nationality: Filipino
- Born: 4 February 1898 Tolosa, Leyte, Captaincy General of the Philippines
- Died: 2 July 1977 (aged 79) Manila, Philippines

Sport
- Country: Philippines
- Sport: Track and field
- Retired: 1925
Medal record
Men's athletics
Representing the Philippines
Far Eastern Championship Games
Gold medal – first place	1917 Tokyo	100 yards
Gold medal – first place	1917 Tokyo	220 yards
Gold medal – first place	1919 Manila	100 yards
Gold medal – first place	1919 Manila	220 yards
Gold medal – first place	1921 Shanghai	100 yards
Gold medal – first place	1921 Shanghai	220 yards
Gold medal – first place	1921 Shanghai	880 yards relay
Gold medal – first place	1923 Osaka	100 yards
Gold medal – first place	1923 Osaka	220 yards
Gold medal – first place	1925 Manila	100 metres
Silver medal – second place	1925 Manila	200 metres

Fortunato Catalon (4 February 1898 – 2 July 1977) was a Filipino track and field sprinter, who was active in the first half of 1900s. He was selected for the first Philippine delegation to the 1924 Olympics (although he did not participate in the games due to illness after arriving in Paris). In 1973, he received special citation from the Asian Amateur Athletic Association as one of the top athletes in Asia for his record in track and field during the first two decades of the 20th century.

== Early years ==
Fortunato Peliño Catalon was born in the town of Tolosa, Leyte on February 4, 1898. Both his parents, Juanzo and Petrona Catalon, were peasants. After attending elementary school in Tolosa, the young Fortunato studied in Tacloban.

He took up sports in high school, but failed in his initial attempts to join the school's track team. Despite his short stature, his teachers recognized his remarkable speed in short distance running, providing him the opportunity to train in track and field. At a time when sprinting technique was less defined, Catalon—like most of his national peers—used to raise his arms in the air and push his chest forwards when crossing the finish line (as opposed to the lean-in technique which later became common).

== Career ==
=== Far Eastern Championship Games ===
Fortunato Catalon participated at the 1917 Far Eastern Championship Games in Tokyo. He won two sprint titles, the 100-yard dash and the 220-yard dash becoming Asia's top sprinter at the age of 19. Since the first Far Eastern Games in Manila, Filipino athletes have dominated the sprint events, with Pio Robillos winning both the 100-yard and 220-yard races in 1913, and Genaro Saavedra and Nicolas Llaneta winning both events at the 1915 Games in Shanghai. Fortunato's winning time of 10.0 seconds in the 100 yards was a new games record while his time of 23.8 seconds in the 220 yards was two-tenths off Robillos' tournament best. Teaming up with Pedro Ablan, Saavedra and Nicolas Llaneta, he also emerged victorious in the 880-yard relay. Catalon returned to defend his individual title at the 1919 Manila Games and successfully did so by equalling his 100-yard record and bettering his 220-yard time to 23.0 seconds.

He continued his success at the Far Eastern Championship Games with two further successive sprint doubles at the 1921 Shanghai Games and then the 1923 Manila Games. A 220-yard games record of 22.2 seconds came at the latter edition.

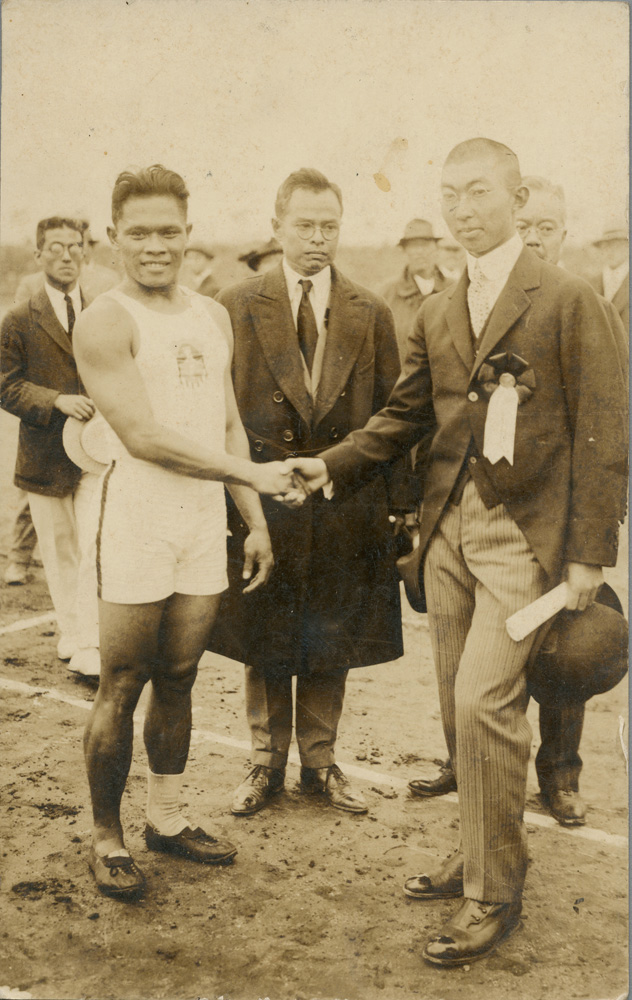
1923 press photo of Prince Chichibu (right), the second son of the Emperor of Japan, congratulating Fortunato Catalon, just after the latter had decisively defeated the four athletes of Japan in the 1923 Far Eastern Championship Games. In the center, is Philippine leader Camilo Osias

A run of 9.8 seconds in March 1923 ranked him sixth in the world rankings for the 100-yd dash that year. Upon meeting him while touring the Philippines, world record holder Charley Paddock of the United States called Catalon a "champion of champions". News of his near-world record runs spread to Western media through Fred England and Elwood Brown – the Americans who led the Philippine Amateur Athletic Federation. His feats encouraged interest in the country of sending a Philippines team for the first time for the 1924 Paris Olympics. Catalon was entered for the men's Olympic 100 metres and 200 metres, being drawn alongside America's Paddock in the former, but did not attend the games or start in those events. In the end it was another sprinter, his rival David Nepomuceno, that became the first Filipino to compete at the Olympics and he composed the entire one-man 1924 Filipino squad.

At the 1925 Far Eastern Championship Games held in Manila, Catalon won his fifth consecutive 100m title (starting from the 100-yard dash), but came second in the 200m to Nepomuceno, breaking his undefeated record. This brought Catalon's tally of individual medals at the competition to nine – a record in the athletics section by a margin of two (over Mikio Oda's seven eventual titles).

=== Retirement ===
Following his retirement he became an official in the sport, acting as a race starter. In 1927, he coached track at the University of the Philippines. His first major event in this role was at the 1934 Far Eastern Championship Games in Manila, where his compatriot Rafael de Leon became the last ever Far Eastern 100 metres champion. He was the starter for the 100 m final for the 1954 Asian Games, also held in Manila, and his lenient starting approach favoured Genaro Cabrera – the Filipino silver medallist. Catalon studied into his twenties and eventually received a college diploma from the University of Santo Tomas in Manila. From 1936 to 1938, he served in the Philippine Army. Later, he returned to coaching until the Second World War broke out.

== Family ==
Catalon was married in 1924 with Elisa Remandaban in Tolosa, Leyte.

== Death and Honours ==
He died on 2 July 1977 in Manila, Philippines at the age of 79 years old.

In his lifetime, he was recognized as Asia's top sprinter. In 1973, he received special citation from the Asian Amateur Athletic Association as one of the top athletes in Asia for his record in track and field during the first two decades of the 20th century.

He was touted as a potential early 20th century candidate for admission into the Philippine Sports Hall of Fame.

== See also ==
- David Nepomuceno
- Regino Ylanan
- Athletics at the Far Eastern Championship Games
