= Tennis at the Far Eastern Championship Games =

Tennis was contested at the Far Eastern Championship Games. It was one of the main eight sports to feature on the programme. The following are the known results for the tennis event of the games.

== Editions ==
Games	Year	Host city	Host country	Singles champion	Doubles champions
I	1913	Manila	Philippines	Leonardo Suarez (PHI)	Leonardo Suarez and Gil Fargas (PHI)
II	1915	Shanghai	China	Ichiya Kumagae (JPN)	Ichiya Kumagae and Kashio Seiichiro (JPN)
III	1917	Tokyo	Japan	Ichiya Kumagae (JPN)	Ichiya Kumagae and Hachishiro Mikami (JPN)
IV	1919	Manila	Philippines	Hachishiro Mikami (JPN)	Gil Fargas and Emiliano Bolaños (PHI)
V	1921	Shanghai	China	Gil Fargas (PHI)	Leonardo Suarez and Gil Fargas (PHI)
VI	1923	Osaka	Japan	Teizo Toba (JPN)	Abe and Kawasuma (JPN)
VII	1925	Manila	Philippines	Gavia (PHI)	Yoshida and Kobayashi (JPN)
VIII	1927	Shanghai	China	Khoo Hooi Hye (CHN)	Gordon Lum and Khoo Hooi Hye (CHN)
IX	1930	Tokyo	Japan	?	?
X	1934	Manila	Philippines	Felicisimo Ampon (PHI)	?
