= Basketball at the Far Eastern Championship Games =

Basketball was contested at the Far Eastern Championship Games and was one of the eight main sports on the programme.

Given its close connection with the United States, the Philippines was the most developed basketball nation among the game's main three participants. The Philippines won nine of the ten basketball tournaments held from 1913 to 1934, being defeated only on one occasion by China at the 1921 Shanghai Games.

== Editions ==
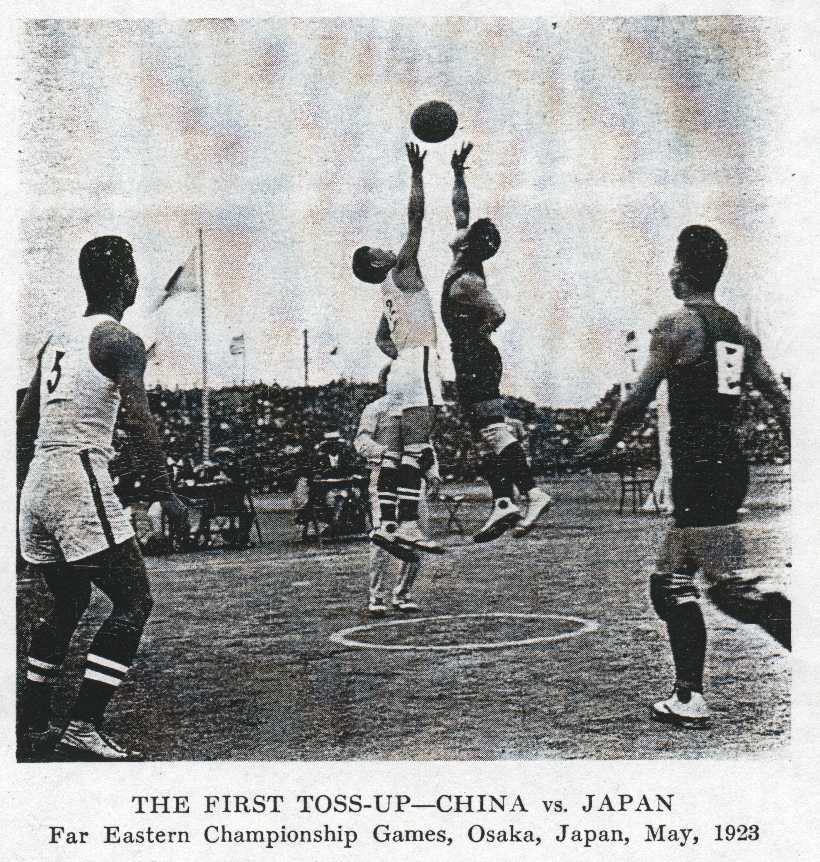
China vs. Japan, 1923

Games	Year	Host city	Host country	Champion
I	1913	Manila	Philippines	Philippines
II	1915	Shanghai	China	Philippines
III	1917	Tokyo	Japan	Philippines
IV	1919	Manila	Philippines	Philippines
V	1921	Shanghai	China	China
VI	1923	Osaka	Japan	Philippines
VII	1925	Manila	Philippines	Philippines
VIII	1927	Shanghai	China	Philippines
IX	1930	Tokyo	Japan	Philippines
X	1934	Manila	Philippines	Philippines

== Medal summary ==
As 1934

Rank	Nation	Gold	Silver	Bronze	Total
1	Philippines (PHI)	9	1	0	10
2	China (CHN)	1	9	0	10
Totals (2 entries)		10	10	0	20
