= Regino Ylanan =

Filipino sports administrator and athlete

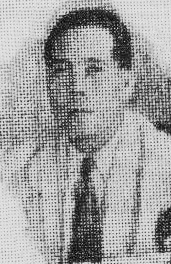

Personal information
- Full name: Regino R. Ylanan
- National team: Philippines
- Born: September 7, 1889 Bogo, Cebu, Captaincy General of the Philippines
- Died: 1963 (aged 73)

Sport
- Sport: Athletics, Baseball
- Position: Catcher (baseball)
Medal record
Men's athletics
Representing Philippines
Far Eastern Championship Games
Gold medal – first place	1913 Manila	Shot put
Gold medal – first place	1913 Manila	Discus throw
Gold medal – first place	1913 Manila	Pentathlon
Gold medal – first place	1915 Shanghai	Shot put
Bronze medal – third place	1915 Shanghai	Pentathlon

Regino R. Ylanan (7 September 1889 – 1963) was a Filipino athlete, physician, sports administrator, physical educator, and sports historian. He rose to fame with three gold medals in track and field at the 1913 Far Eastern Championship Games in Manila. He won two further medals at the 1915 Games and also represented his country in baseball at three editions of the tournament.

He was a founder of the National Collegiate Athletic Association in the Philippines in 1924. A doctor of medicine and surgeon by training, in 1930 he became the first Filipino to gain a physical education degree from the United States. At age 30 he was appointed head of physical education at the University of the Philippines – the country's first and most prestigious university. He later served as national sports director and was a long-standing secretary-treasurer for the Philippine Amateur Athletic Federation (a forerunner to the national Olympic committee). He coached David Nepomuceno—the country's first Olympian in 1928—and was the Filipino head of delegation for the 1936 Berlin Olympics.

Ylanan helped develop sports in the Philippines, with a focus on Western sports such as baseball, basketball and track and field. He developed a national sports programme, assisted in the building of the Rizal Memorial Sports Complex and wrote several works on sport, including a book which was posthumously published.

== Early life and education ==
Regino Ylanan was born in Bogo, Cebu on September 7, 1889. He attended at Cebu High School and played baseball for the institution as a catcher. He continued to play the sport while studying to be a doctor at the University of the Philippines College of Medicine.

Reaching his twenties, he enjoyed his first experience of high level sport in 1911 when he was named in the all-Filipino national baseball team as a center fielder. Despite his early baseball success, it was in track and field that Ylanan made his impact as an athlete.

He graduated as a doctor of medicine from University of the Philippines in 1918. He practiced as a surgeon at the Philippine General Hospital.

He attended the Springfield College in Massachusetts in the United States where he graduated in 1920 with a bachelor's degree in physical education.

== Career ==
=== Competitive career ===
Ylanan was selected to represent the Philippines at the inaugural Far Eastern Championship Games in 1913 in the athletics competition. At the event in Manila, his throwing abilities from playing baseball translated into success in the shot put and the discus throw, events which he won with marks of 10.76 m (35 ft 3 1/2 in) and 28.28 m (92 ft 9 1/4 in), respectively. He won a third athletics gold medal in the pentathlon, making him the top performing athlete at the competition and a key figure in securing the athletics title for the Philippines. Still a student, he returned for the 1915 Games held in Shanghai and defended his shot put title with an improved throw of 10.91 m (35 ft 9 1/2 in). Although he didn't match the success of his first appearance, he did reach the podium for a second time in the form of a pentathlon bronze medal. The Philippines won the championship title for second time, although it was Genaro Saavedra that led the charge this time as he took four gold medals in total. Ylanan competed one further time at the competition, playing as catcher for the Filipino baseball team at the 1917 Far Eastern Championship Games.

=== As coach and support staff ===
He served as the head coach for the Filipino baseball team at the 1921 and 1923 Far Eastern Championship Games; the team won the title in both years.

Western sports were becoming increasingly popular during the period of American influence and the American-educated Ylanan fostered the development of such sports. In 1924 he coached David Nepomuceno, a sprinter who, at the 1924 Paris Olympics, became the first ever Filipino Olympian as the country sent a two-man delegation comprising Ylanan as the sole official and Nepomuceno as the sole athlete.

He was the chief medic for the 1928 Olympic Philippines team and then the head of the national delegation at the 1936 Berlin Olympics, where Miguel White won the country's second ever Olympic athletics medal in the hurdles.

=== Sports administration ===
Ylanan helped create the National Collegiate Athletic Association in 1924, representing the University of the Philippines among the seven founding colleges in the national sports league. The league went on to be highly influential in the development of sport in the Philippines.

Ylanan headed the Filipino delegation for the 1925 Far Eastern Championship Games in Manila. In 1927 he was promoted to the position of national athletic director and also the position of secretary-treasurer for the Philippine Amateur Athletic Federation – the country's leading sports organisation. He acted in the latter position for over twenty years. Working alongside Jorge B. Vargas, the organisation's president, his achievements during his tenure included a ten-year national plan for athletic centres to train youths and the building of the Rizal Memorial Sports Complex on the old Manila Carnival grounds as the main stadium for the 1934 Far Eastern Championship Games, which was the tenth and final edition of the competition.

Regional sports competition declined shortly afterwards given the onset of the Second Sino-Japanese War in 1937. He remained an authority on sports in the country, in capacities as an administrator, writer and medic. He documented the continued rise of basketball in the Philippines in the 1940s, as well as the development of baseball in the country on which he remarked that it "seemed to fill a long-felt want with the Filipino".

== Death ==
Ylanan died sometime in 1963 due to a heart attack while in a process of writing a book.

His wife Carmen Wilson Ylanan finished the work entitled The History and Development of Physical Education and Sports in the Philippines and it was published in 1965, which a second edition with further additions by her following in 1974.

He was given several awards posthumously, including honours from the Philippine Sports Writers Association and a YMCA Triangle Award. In 1999 he was awarded the title of "Sports Leader of the Millenium" by the Philippine Sportswriters Association.
