= Juan Taduran =

Filipino track and field athlete in the 1920s

Personal information
- Nationality: Filipino

Sport
- Country: Philippines
- Sport: Track and field
Medal record
Men's athletics
Representing the Philippines
Far Eastern Championship Games
Gold medal – first place	1921 Shanghai	Decathlon
Gold medal – first place	1923 Osaka	Decathlon
Gold medal – first place	1925 Osaka	Decathlon
Silver medal – second place	1919 Manila	Decathlon
Bronze medal – third place	1919 Manila	880 yards
Bronze medal – third place	1925 Osaka	800 metres

Juan K. Taduran was a Filipino track and field athlete who competed in the decathlon and in middle-distance running events. In the 1920s he won three consecutive gold medals in the decathlon at the Far Eastern Championship Games – a forerunner of the Asian Games.

Taduran made his first international impact at the 1919 Far Eastern Championship Games in Manila, where he was the close runner-up to China's Chu Ente in the decathlon and placed third in the 880-yard run. He returned for the 1921 Games and defeated defending Ente in Shanghai to become the Far Eastern decathlon champion – the second Filipino to do so after Genaro Saavedra.

He won that title two more times successively at the 1923 Games and 1925 Games. This made him the second athlete to win three straight titles in an event at the competition, after multiple sprint champion Fortunato Catalon. Ultimately this made him the most successful combined events athlete in the competition's history. Taduran also won an 800 metres bronze medal in his final appearance in 1925.

Following his retirement from athletics he turned to coaching and was head coach of the Filipino baseball team for the 1930 Far Eastern Championship Games. The Philippines were defeated in all games at that tournament.
