= Philippines at the 1924 Summer Olympics =

Sporting event delegation

- IOC code: PHI
- NOC: Philippine Amateur Athletic Federation

in Paris, France May 4, 1924 – July 27, 1924
- Competitors: 1 (1 man) in 1 sport
- Flag bearer: David Nepomuceno
- Officials: 2
- Medals: Gold 0 Silver 0 Bronze 0 Total 0

Summer Olympics appearances (overview)
- 1924; 1928; 1932; 1936; 1948; 1952; 1956; 1960; 1964; 1968; 1972; 1976; 1980; 1984; 1988; 1992; 1996; 2000; 2004; 2008; 2012; 2016; 2020; 2024

The Philippines competed at the 1924 Summer Olympics in Paris, France, which were held from May 4 to July 27, 1924. The nation's participation at these Games marked its debut, and the debut of any Southeast Asian country, at the Summer Olympics. The delegation consisted of one athlete, sprinter David Nepomuceno, and two officials, attaché B. Minelle and athletics coach and executive officer Regino Ylanan. Two other athletes, Fortunato Catalon and Juan Taduran, were supposed to join Nepomuceno at the Games but did not start in their initial events, with the former arriving in Paris yet not competing and the latter sustaining a collarbone injury; Taduran continued to serve in the delegation as a representative for the Philippines.

After the Philippines became a member of the International Olympic Committee in 1918, the nation had to send a team to the 1924 Summer Olympics as a prerequisite. The Hawaiian Amateur Athletic Union (HAAU) invited the nation to qualify for the United States' Olympic team under the Hawaiian team as the Amateur Athletic Union (AAU) had granted the HAAU authority over the Philippines within the AAU. Later on, then-secretary of the Philippine Amateur Athletic Federation (PAAF) Camilo Osías sent a letter to the HAAU rejecting the invite. He stated that the Philippines would compete at the Games under the auspices of the PAAF as a member of the Far Eastern Athletic Association as opposed to competing under the auspices of the HAAU.

Before the opening ceremony of the Games, the French Olympic Committee decided that the flag of the United States would have to be displayed alongside the flag of the Philippines during the Parade of Nations and in the event of a possible podium finish, as the PAAF was attached to the American Olympic Association at the time. Flagbearer Nepomuceno and Catalon unsuccessfully protested the decision, as other nations with similar statuses did not have to follow the same procedure. Nepomuceno participated in two events, the men's 100 meters and the 200 meters. He failed to advance from the preliminary races of both events.

== Background ==
Under the Amateur Athletic Union (AAU), the territorial Hawaiian Amateur Athletic Union (HAAU) would have had authority over the United States' island possessions such as the Philippines, whereas the nation's athletes would have to compete under the HAAU to qualify for the United States' team to be eligible to compete at the Olympic Games. In 1918, the Philippines became a member of the International Olympic Committee (IOC) under a condition that it would send athletes to the 1924 Summer Olympics. The HAAU invited the Philippines to compete under the Hawaiian team for the United States' team to qualify for the Games; HAAU secretary Ellen Fullard-Leo had opined that the Philippines would not have been able to send a team unless they would compete under them. Additionally, as late as 1923 Catalon and decathlete Juan Taduran were expected to compete by American newswriters in the 1924 United States Olympic trials in track and field in Cambridge, Massachusetts, at Harvard Stadium.

PAAF secretary Camilo Osías sent a letter to the HAAU on January 21, 1924, stating the PAAF's unwillingness to compete under the HAAU. According to the letter, the country had the right to compete at the Olympic Games as a separate entity from the HAAU as the PAAF was a member of the Far Eastern Athletic Association (FEAA). It also stated that the nation would apply to compete at the Olympic Games as such through the FEAA representative and IOC member Kanō Jigorō. Its participation at the Olympic Games was then organized by the PAAF under the auspices of then-PAAF president and Senate president Manuel L. Quezon, although the PAAF's recognition as the National Olympic Committee of the nation came later in 1929.

The 1924 Summer Olympics were held from May 4 to July 27, 1924, in Paris, France. This edition of the Games marked the Philippines' first appearance and the first time a Southeast Asian country competed at the Olympic Games.

== Delegation ==
The three initial athletes for the 1924 Summer Olympics included Catalon, Taduran, and sprinter David Nepomuceno. Nepomuceno and Catalon were considered "world-class athletes" by the Philippine Olympian Association. Catalon and Taduran were gold medal winners at different editions of the Far Eastern Championship Games; the former won ten and the latter won two in the lead-up to the Games. The PAAF held trials for their selection of athletes who would compete at the Games which were held on May 5, 1924 in Manila. Nepomuceno and Catalon both ran the 100 yards in a credited time of 9.45 seconds at the trials to qualify for the Olympics. Their times were within one-fifth of a second of the world record at that time held by Jack Donaldson. Catalon and Nepomuceno trained in Manila in their preparations for the Games. Catalon was set to compete in the men's 100 meters and 200 meters, while Taduran was set to compete in the men's decathlon. Nepomuceno was the sole athlete that competed for the nation, and he participated in the men's 100 meters and 200 meters.

Three weeks before the Games, Taduran injured his collarbone at a football game with American G.I.s. He went to the Games as a representative for the nation as to his injury left him unable to compete. After a 33 day voyage to Marseille, France, by sea, and a train ride to Paris, Nepomuceno and Catalon arrived a week before the opening ceremony for training. Contemporary reporter Rey Vergilio Lachica of the Manila Bulletin described Nepomuceno as "dead tired" after the journey. Despite arriving in Paris, Catalon did not attend nor compete at the Games. After the voyage, a magazine quoted Nepomuceno saying:

"Sana yung mga susunod sa akin ay hindi maranasan ang naranasan ko." (English translation: I hope that the ones succeeding me will not experience the things that I have experienced.")

The final Philippine delegation to the 1924 Summer Olympics was composed of four people: Nepomuceno; Taduran; B. Minelle, an attaché; and Regino Ylanan, the executive officer and Nepomuceno's athletics coach.

== Opening ceremony and flag ruling ==
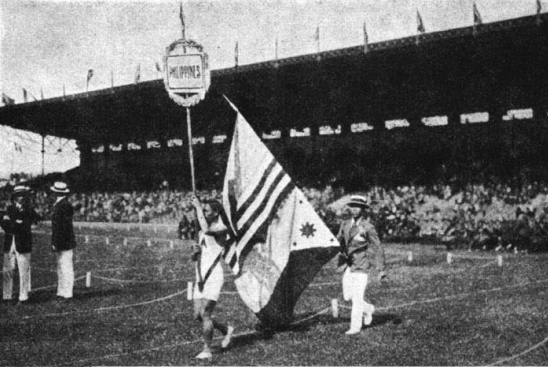
Nepomuceno holding the flags of the United States (top) and the Philippines (bottom) for the opening ceremony

Prior to the Parade of Nations, the French Olympic Committee (CNOF) had to decide on the flags to be held by the nation in the parade and displayed in a possible podium finish, as the PAAF was still attached to the American Olympic Association (AOA). It was then referred to the Embassy of the United States, which stated that they would allow any procedure made by the CNOF concerning the flags to be flown.

The CNOF decided that in the parade and in a possible podium finish, the flag of the United States would have to be flown above the flag of the Philippines. The decision was communicated to the PAAF through cable and orally to both athletes. Catalon and Nepomuceno objected to the decision and cited the participation of the teams representing Canada and Ireland, who did not have to display the flag of Great Britain alongside that of their home nation. Both also urged the CNOF to solely display the Philippine flag in the event of a podium finish by an athlete representing the nation. Nepomuceno additionally argued that both flags were too heavy for him to carry in the parade. He added a request for the flag of the United States to be smaller than the Philippine flag if the decision was to be upheld. The CNOF denied this request on June 15. The Philippine delegation marched 36th out of the 42 nations present in the Parade of Nations within the opening ceremony on July 5; Nepomuceno ultimately held both flags for the delegation while Ylanan accompanied him.

== Athletics ==
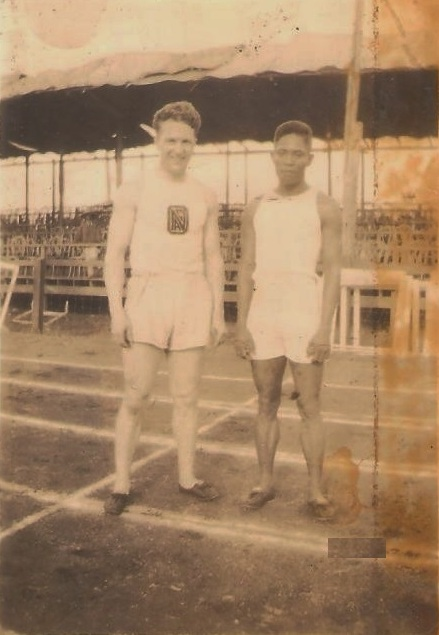
Nepomuceno (right) with Loren Murchison of the United States (left) on the track for their events

The athletics events were held at the Stade de Colombes. Nepomuceno first competed in the men's 100 metres on July 6, where he ran in the sixth preliminary heat. He placed last out of the six people in his round, and finished with a time not fast enough to progress. Harold Abrahams of Great Britain eventually won the gold medal on July 7, finishing with an Olympic record-setting time of 10.6 seconds.

Nepomuceno then competed in the men's 200 metres on July 8, where he ran in the fifteenth preliminary heat. He placed last out of the three people in his round, and again finished with a time not fast enough to progress. Jackson Scholz of the United States eventually won the gold medal on July 9, finishing with an Olympic record-setting time of 21.6 seconds.

Key
- Note–Ranks given for track events are within the athlete's heat only
- DNS = Did not start
- ? = Unknown time

Track events summary
Athlete	Event	Heats		Quarterfinals		Semifinals		Final	
Athlete	Event	Result	Rank	Result	Rank	Result	Rank	Result	Rank
David Nepomuceno	Men's 100 m	?	6	Did not advance					
David Nepomuceno	Men's 200 m	?	3	Did not advance					
Fortunato Catalon	Men's 100 m	DNS		Did not advance					
Fortunato Catalon	Men's 200 m	DNS		Did not advance					

Combined events – Men's decathlon summary
Athlete	Event	100 m	LJ	SP	HJ	400 m	110H	DT	PV	JT	1500 m	Final	Rank
Juan Taduran	Result	DNS											
Juan Taduran	Points	DNS											

== Legacy ==
After the Games, all three initial athletes did not compete at another edition of the Olympic Games though they medaled at subsequent editions of the Far Eastern Championship Games. Nepomuceno won the silver medal in the 100 meters and gold in the 200 meters at the 1925 Far Eastern Championship Games, while Catalon earned gold in former and silver in the latter; Taduran won the gold medal in the decathlon and the bronze in the 800 meters. Catalon became the most successful athletics competitor and Taduran became the only athlete to win three consecutive decathlons in the history of the Games after he had won the event at the 1925 edition. Nepomuceno was the only athlete to earn another medal at a subsequent Games, earning the gold medal in the 100 meters and bronze in the 200 meters at the 1927 Far Eastern Championship Games.

Following their retirements from sport, Nepomuceno served in the Philippine Scouts and the United States Navy, Catalon served as an official in the sport as a race starter, and Taduran coached the national baseball team.

As of August 11, 2024, the Philippines has competed in every Summer Olympics since with the exception of the 1980 Summer Olympics, boycotting in response to the Soviet invasion of Afghanistan. Swimmer Teófilo Yldefonso won the Philippines' first Olympic medal at the 1928 Summer Olympics, while weightlifter Hidilyn Diaz won its first Olympic gold medal at the 2020 Summer Olympics. As of the 2024 Summer Olympics, the Philippines has won three gold medals, five silver medals, and ten bronze medals.
