= Dionisio Calvo =

Filipino basketball player and coach

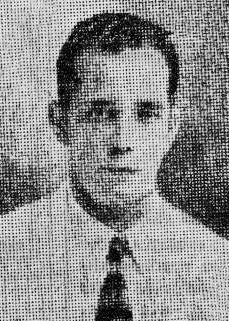
- Born: November 20, 1904; Manila, Philippine Islands
- Died: December 9, 1977 (aged 73)
- Basketball career

Career information
- College: UP
- Position: Guard

Career history

Playing
- c. 1920s: Manila Sporting Goods Co.

Coaching
- 1929–1930s: UST
- 1930s: San Beda
- c. 1939: De La Salle
- 1936, 1948, 1951: Philippines
Association football career
Managerial career
- Years: Team
- 1930–1934: Philippines
- 1939–1940s: De La Salle
- 1954: Philippines
Medal record
Men's basketball
Representing Philippines
Far Eastern Games
Gold medal – first place	1925 Manila	Team
Men's diving
Representing Philippines
Far Eastern Games
Gold medal – first place	1921 Shanghai	Individual

Dionisio "Chito" Calvo (November 20, 1904 – December 9, 1977) was a Filipino basketball player, swimmer, and coach who mentored both the basketball and football national teams of the Philippines. He was one of the greatest Filipino sportsmen in history and helped in the development of both Philippine and Asian basketball.

== Early life ==
Born in Sampaloc, Manila, Philippines, Calvo studied at the Ateneo grade school and the Manila high school prior to enrolling at the University of the Philippines college of agriculture at age 18. In 1921, Calvo became the first Filipino to win the platform diving title at the Far Eastern Games, forerunner of the Asian Games. He embarked on a brilliant career as an all-around athlete excelling in swimming, basketball, soccer, track, and even boxing.

== Basketball and coaching ==
He was a guard for the championship-winning Philippine basketball team alongside Lou Salvador in the 1925 Far Eastern Games, though he earlier represented the country not as a basketball player. He was a member of the Philippine national swimming team that competed in the 1921 and 1923 Far Eastern Games.

Calvo led the University of the Philippines to the 1926 NCAA title but earlier captained the Manila Sporting Goods Co. to Philippine Open title. He eventually retired to focus on college coaching.

His coaching career was a success, mentoring basketball championship teams of San Beda College, and the University of Santo Tomas. He also coached the champion teams of De La Salle College in basketball and football.

Later, Calvo coached the Philippines men's national basketball team to a fifth-place finish in the 1936 Summer Olympics held at Berlin, Germany. A one-point loss to the United States prevented the Filipinos from qualifying in the round of four. The fifth-place finish remained the best finish by the national team and by an Asian country in the Olympic Games basketball history. The team included Filipino legends Ambrosio Padilla, Charlie Borck and Jacinto Ciria Cruz, along with Primitivo Martinez, Bibiano Ouano, Franco Marquicias, Francisco and Jose Vestil.

In 1938, Calvo organized the Manila Industrial and Commercial Athletic Association (MICAA). MICAA was a commercialized amateur basketball league that help shaped Philippine basketball for more than 30 years.

After the Second World War, Calvo coached the second Philippine Olympic basketball team in the 1948 Summer Olympics held at London, England, United Kingdom. The team finished 12th but set a new record by thrashing Iraq, 102–30 in their opening game. The Philippines was the first country to score over 100 points in a single game of the Olympic Games basketball history.

Calvo was also the head coach of the first Philippine national team that captured the basketball gold medal in the 1951 Asian Games and includes basketball legends, Carlos Loyzaga and Lauro Mumar.

Calvo along with Ambrosio Padilla initiated the formation of the Asian Basketball Confederation (now the FIBA Asia) in 1960 and served as its first ever Secretary-General with Padilla as its first president.

He was the first Filipino and a charter inductee for the FIBA Hall of Fame when he was inducted as a contributor on March 1, 2007.

== Posthumous citation ==
Two years after his death, Calvo was inducted into the Ateneo Sports Hall of Fame. In 1982, the organizing committee of the seventh Asian Youth basketball championship has cited Calvo for his efforts in establishing the Asian Basketball Confederation.

== Awards and achievements ==
- 1925 Far Eastern Games champion
- 1926 NCAA Philippines champions
- Philippine Open champion
- 1936 Summer Olympics, fifth place (head coach)
- 1948 Summer Olympics, 12th place (head coach)
- 1951 Asian Games champions
- Member, FIBA Hall of Fame as a contributor.

== Football ==
Calvo as Philippines coach in 1930.

Calvo also coached the Philippines national football team that finished with a tie for second place in the 1934 Far Eastern Games. He also led the team that participated at the 1954 Asian Games.

=== Statistics ===
Managerial

Nat	Team	from	to	Record				
Nat	Team	from	to	Games	Wins	Draws	Losses	Win %
(Philippines)	Philippines	1934		3	1	0	2	33.33
(Philippines)	Philippines	1954		2	0	0	2	0.00
Total				5	1	0	4	20.00
