= Yoshio Okita =

Japanese hammer and discus thrower

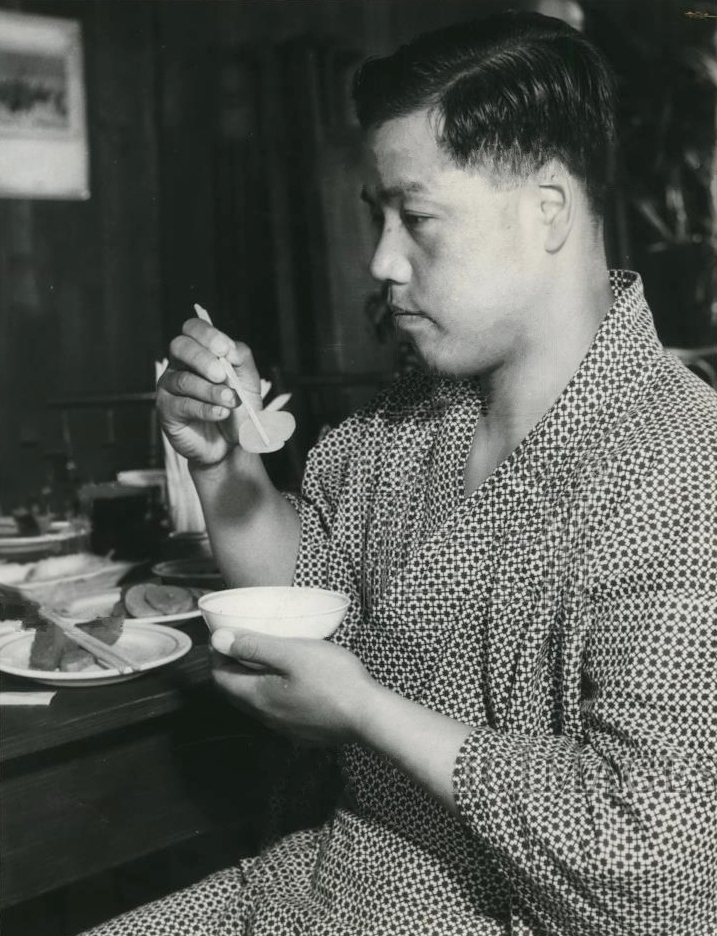
- Okita at the 1932 Olympics

Personal information
- Born: March 28, 1903 Hiroshima, Japan
- Died: April 28, 2001 (aged 98)

Sport
- Country: Japan
- Sport: Athletics
- Event(s): Discus throw, hammer throw
- Club: Waseda Athletic Club

Achievements and titles
- Personal best(s): DT – 41.22 m (1927); HT – 46.51 m (1929)
Medal record
Far Eastern Championship Games
| Silver medal – second place | 1923 Osaka | Discus throw |
| Bronze medal – third place | 1925 Manila | Discus throw |
| Gold medal – first place | 1927 Shanghai | Discus throw |
| Bronze medal – third place | 1930 Tokyo | Discus throw |

Yoshio Okita (Japanese: 沖田 芳夫, March 28, 1903 – April 28, 2001) was a Japanese track and field athlete who won a gold medal in the discus throw at the 1927 Far Eastern Championship Games. He competed in the hammer and discus throw at the 1928 Summer Olympics and placed 15th and 30th, respectively. He also attended the 1932 and 1936 Olympics as a field coach for the Japanese athletics team. In 1993 Okita took part in the World Masters Athletics Championships. Being the sole hammer throw competitor in the over 90 years age group he won the event with a result of 12.1 m.
