= Athletics at the 1921 Far Eastern Championship Games =

V Far Eastern Championship Games
- Dates: May and June 1921
- Host city: Shanghai, China
- Events: 18
- Participation: 3 nations

At the 1921 Far Eastern Championship Games, the athletics events were held in Shanghai, China in May and June. A total of 18 athletics events were contested at the competition. The five-mile track race was held for the first time, replacing the road race over the same distance that featured at the previous edition. Lighter implements were adopted for the shot put in comparison to the international standard.

The Philippines won over half the available gold medals and were the most successful team in the athletics programme. Japan managed five golds and also nine silver medals in the sport. China performed poorly in comparison, receiving only six medals in total, although half of these were gold medals. Japan had most success in tracks events, particularly in middle- and long-distance running, where it completed a medal sweep. China won its four individual medals in field and combined track and field events. The Philippines had a top-two finisher in all but four events.

Fortunato Catalon defended both his sprint titles, maintaining his domination of the discipline since the 1917 games. Antonio Alo, another Filipino, was the only other person to defend a title from the 1919 event with a games record victory in the pole vault. Tu Jungtang was China's outstanding athlete as he won an unusual discus throw and pentathlon double.

Katsuo Okazaki, the winner of the mile run and 880-yards runner-up, later represented Japan at the 1924 Summer Olympics and went on to become the Japanese Minister of Foreign Affairs.

== Medal summary ==
Event	Gold		Silver		Bronze	
100 yards	Fortunato Catalon (PHI)	10.0	Eriberto Castillon (PHI)	???	Ichiro Kaga (JPN)	???
220 yards straight	Fortunato Catalon (PHI)	23.2	Eriberto Castillon (PHI)	???	Ichiro Kaga (JPN)	???
440 yards	Vicente Lopez (PHI)	52.8	Valentin Malinao (PHI)	???	Francisco Danao (PHI)	???
880 yards	Kikuo Toda (JPN)	2:03.8	Katsuo Okazaki (JPN)	???	Saburo Hasumi (JPN)	???
One mile	Katsuo Okazaki (JPN)	4:40.2	Kikuo Toda (JPN)	???	Saburo Hasumi (JPN)	???
Five miles	Nobuyuki Yoshioka (JPN)	26:44.0	Konosuke Sano (JPN)	???	Yuzo Hatakeyama (JPN)	???
120 yd hurdles	Ignacio Amad (PHI)	16.6	Bunkichi Watanabe (JPN)	???	Pedro Abiera (PHI)	???
220 yd hurdles straight	Juan Escamos (PHI)	26.4	Bunkichi Watanabe (JPN)	???	Pedro Abiera (PHI)	???
4×220 yd relay	Philippines (PHI)	1:34.8	Japan (JPN)		China (CHN)	
4×400 yd relay	Philippines (PHI)	3:38.6	Japan (JPN)		China (CHN)	
High jump	Yuan Qingxiang (CHN)	1.71 m	Eduardo Suela (PHI)	1.69 m	Pedro Zorilla (PHI)	1.67 m
Pole vault	Antonio Alo (PHI)	3.51 m	Faustino Carlos (PHI)	??? m	Carlos Nicolas (PHI)	??? m
Long jump	Simon Santos (PHI)	6.77 m	Nicholas Machan (PHI)	6.75 m	Generoso Rivera (PHI)	6.73 m
Shot put	Masasuke Nakamura (JPN)	12.83 m	Moises Lucas (PHI)	12.72 m	Antonio Alo (PHI)	12.55 m
Discus throw	Tu Jungtang (CHN)	32.36 m	Carlos Nicolas (PHI)	31.80 m	Moises Lucas (PHI)	30.74 m
Javelin throw	Nobuo Asaoka (JPN)	47.30 m	Carlos Nicolas (PHI)	47.24 m	Moises Lucas (PHI)	47.20 m
Pentathlon	Tu Jungtang (CHN)	410 pts	Tadaomi Futamura (JPN)	353 pts	Goro Kozawa (JPN)	340 pts
Decathlon	Juan Taduran (PHI)	775 pts	Shinichi Sato (JPN)	760 pts	Chu Ente (CHN)	713 pts
