= Genaro Saavedra =

Filipino track and field athlete

Medal record

Men's athletics

Representing the Philippines

Far Eastern Championship Games
Gold medal – first place	1915 Shanghai	100 yards
Gold medal – first place	1915 Shanghai	High jump
Gold medal – first place	1915 Shanghai	Pole vault
Gold medal – first place	1915 Shanghai	Decathlon
Bronze medal – third place	1915 Shanghai	Long jump
Silver medal – second place	1917 Tokyo	Long jump
Bronze medal – third place	1917 Tokyo	Decathlon
Bronze medal – third place	1919 Manila	Long jump

Genaro Saavedra (born 1895) was a Filipino track and field athlete and four-time Far Eastern Championship Games champion.

While at high school in Ambos Camarines, Saavedra was trained by a Nebraskan sports coach, Clinton "Doc" Fehliman, who taught for six years in the country during its era of American influence. Although primarily interested in American football, Fehliman trained Saavedra in a variety track and field sports as an all-round athlete.

This training paid off on Saavedra's major international debut at the 1915 Far Eastern Championship Games held in Shanghai – the second edition of Asia's first major multi-sport event. Saavedra proved to be the star athlete for the Philippines at the competition: he won the 100-yard dash, pole vault, high jump and the decathlon. He also took a bronze medal in the long jump. This helped lead the Philippines to its second straight athletics championship title. Fehliman deemed Saavedra the "Jim Thorpe of the Orient", given his success across disciplines.

Saavedra returned to represent his country at the 1917 Far Eastern Championship Games in Tokyo. He was less successful at this competition, but still came away with multiple medals in the form of a long jump silver (behind fellow Filipino C. Cardenas) and a bronze in the decathlon. The Philippines team won a third title, helped by Fortunato Catalon's sprint double, although the nation was equal on gold medals with the hosts on this occasion. His last major appearance was the 1919 Manila Games, where he was the long jump bronze medallist.

Saavedra's four titles in Far Eastern competitions ranked him as one of the tournament's most successful track athletes: only Catalon, Mikio Oda and Regino Ylanan won as many individual golds in the competition's history. Saavedra was the only person to have won Far Eastern Championship Games gold medals in four separate disciplines.
