= Katsuo Okazaki =

Japanese athlete and politician (1897-1965)

- 岡崎 勝男
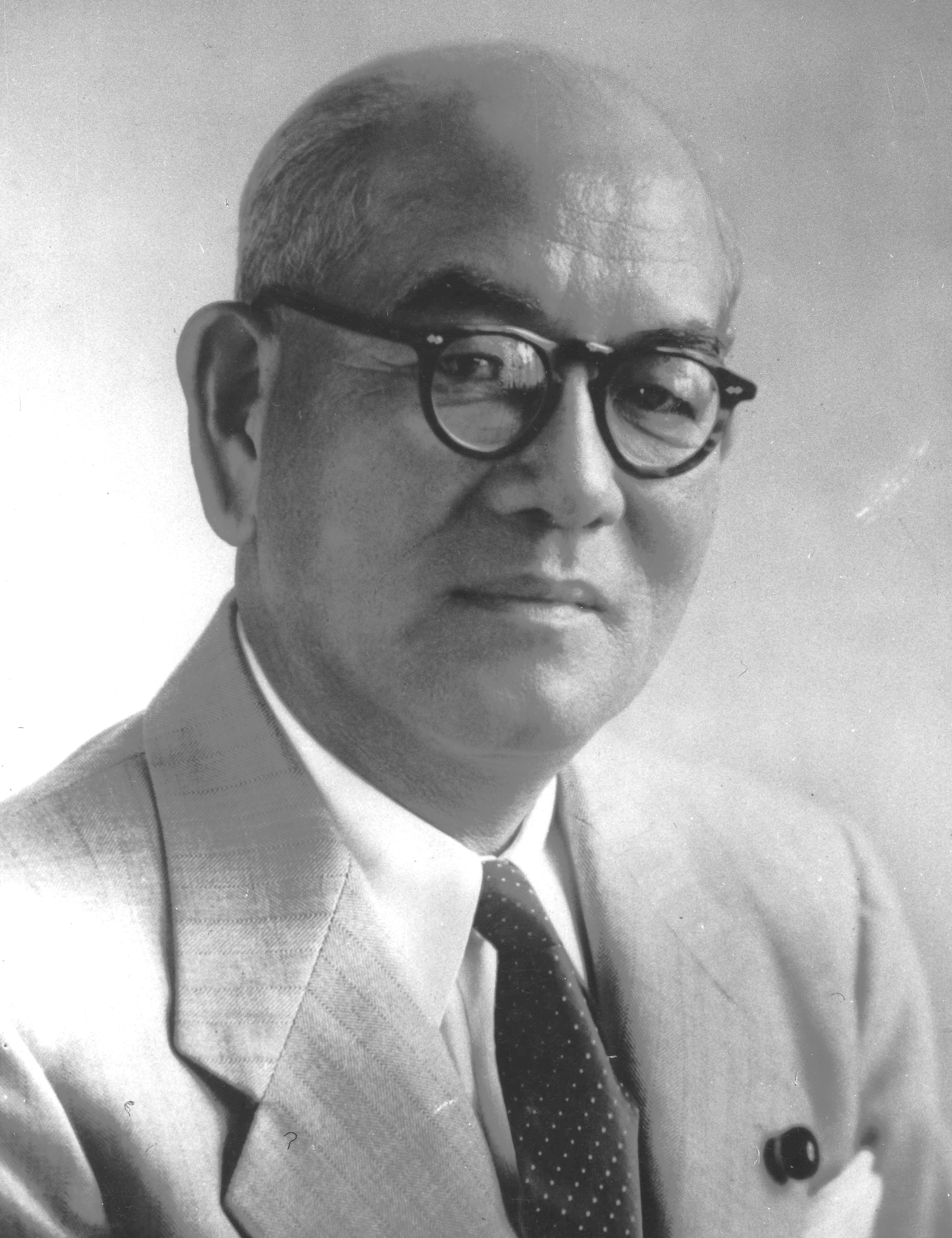

Minister for Foreign Affairs
- In office 30 April 1952 – 10 December 1954
- Prime Minister: Shigeru Yoshida
- Preceded by: Shigeru Yoshida
- Succeeded by: Mamoru Shigemitsu

Director-General of the Reparations Agency
- In office 27 December 1951 – 28 April 1952
- Prime Minister: Shigeru Yoshida
- Preceded by: Hideo Sutō
- Succeeded by: Office abolished

Chief Cabinet Secretary
- In office 6 May 1950 – 26 December 1951
- Prime Minister: Shigeru Yoshida
- Preceded by: Kaneshichi Masuda
- Succeeded by: Shigeru Hori

Member of the House of Representatives
- In office 24 January 1949 – 24 January 1955
- Preceded by: Isozaki Teijo
- Succeeded by: Morito Morishima
- Constituency: Kanagawa 3rd

Chairman of the Shanghai Municipal Council
- In office 5 January 1942 – 1 August 1943
- Preceded by: John Hellyer Liddell
- Succeeded by: Council abolished

Personal details
- Born: 10 July 1897 Yokohama, Kanagawa, Japan
- Died: 10 October 1965 (aged 68) Tokyo, Japan
- Party: LDP (1955–1963)
- Other political affiliations: DLP (1949–1950); LP (1950–1955)
- Spouse: Shimako Okazaki
- Children: 2
- Relatives: Kyoko Ina (granddaughter)
- Education: Tokyo Imperial University
- Sports career
- Sport: Track and field
Medal record
Men's athletics
Representing Japan
Far Eastern Championship Games
Gold medal – first place	1921 Shanghai	1 mile
Gold medal – first place	1923 Osaka	880 yards
Gold medal – first place	1923 Osaka	1 mile
Silver medal – second place	1921 Shanghai	880 yards

Katsuo Okazaki (岡崎 勝男, Okazaki Katsuo; 10 July 1897 – 10 October 1965) was a Japanese diplomat, politician and sportsman. He served as the Japanese foreign minister in the 1950s. He was also the final – and only Japanese – chairman of the Shanghai Municipal Council.

== Early life ==
Okazaki was born on 10 July 1897 in Kanagawa, Japan. He was the 10th son of Yasunosuke Okazaki. He studied law at the University of Tokyo and then joined the Japanese Ministry of Foreign Affairs.

== Sporting prowess ==
Okazaki participated in the 1924 Paris Olympic Summer Games, qualifying for the 5,000 m final with a time of 15.22.2e. In the final, he fainted in the heatwave and was carried away by medics. He had much success at the Far Eastern Championship Games, winning the mile run at the 1921 Games then doing a middle-distance double in the mile and 880 yards at the 1923 event in Osaka.

== Consular positions ==
Okasaki served as second secretary to the Japanese Embassy in Washington, D.C. in the early 1930s.

He also served in numerous positions in China during the 1930s, including serving as Japanese Consul-General in Nanjing after the Fall of Nanking to the Imperial Japanese Army and during the Nanking Massacre. In 1938, he was serving as Japanese Consul General in Canton. In October 1939 was appointed Japanese Consul at Hong Kong, a position he held until January 1941.

== Shanghai Municipal Council ==
In early January 1942 Okazaki was appointed as Chairman of the Shanghai Municipal Council after the British and American members resigned following the commencement of the Pacific War and the occupation of the Shanghai International Settlement by Japanese troops. After the resignation of the Commissioner General, G. Godfrey Phillips which took effect from 1 March 1942, Okasaki also took over the role of Commissioner General in an honorary capacity. He served until 1943 when the council was disbanded.

== Surrender of Japan ==
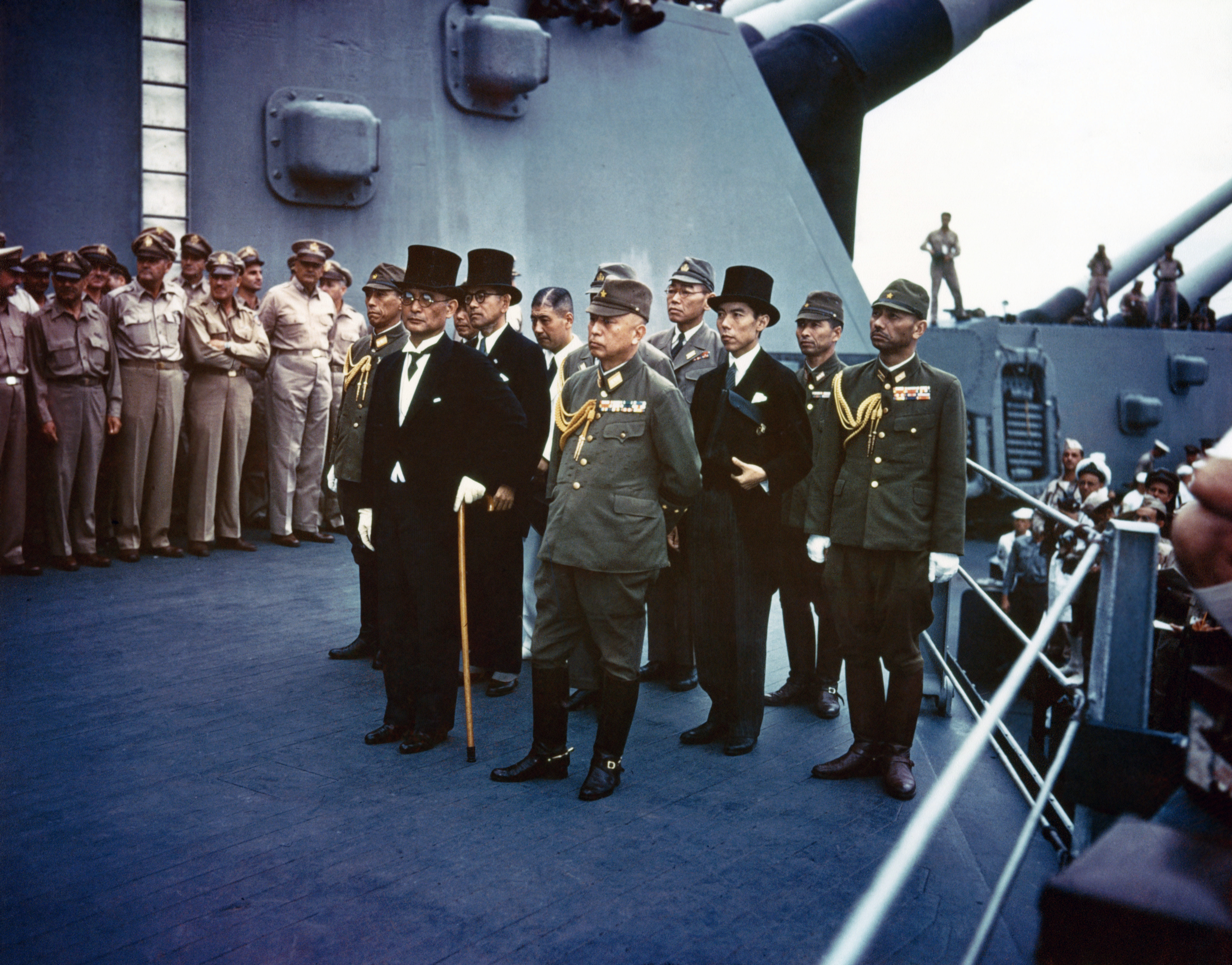
The Japanese representatives on board USS Missouri during the surrender ceremonies on 2 September 1945. Okazaki is in the second row, second from the left (in top hat).

Okazaki took part in the surrender negotiations between the Japanese emissaries and American military officials on Iejima in 1945. He was present as a representative of Japan at the formal surrender on 2 September 1945 aboard the USS Missouri.

== Post-war political and diplomatic career ==
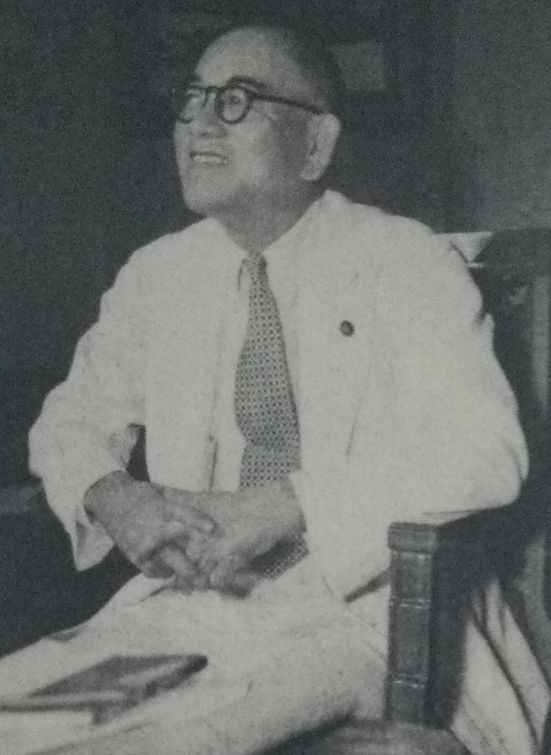
Okazaki in 1951

Okazaki was elected to the Japanese House of Representatives in 1949. In 1951, he was appointed by Prime Minister Shigeru Yoshida as Chief Cabinet Secretary and state minister without portfolio.

In 1952, he was appointed Foreign Minister and served in that position until 1954. In 1954, building on work by Ikeda, Okazaki signed a Mutual Security Assistance (MSA) Agreement with U.S. Ambassador John Allison.

In 1961 he was called out of retirement to serve in the United Nations in what was described at the time as a move to strengthen the Japanese delegation. He served as Japan's delegate to the United Nations from April 1961 to July 1963.

== Death ==
Okazaki died on 10 October 1965 in Tokyo of a stomach ulcer at the age of 68.

== Family members ==
Okazaki was married to Shimako with whom he had a son, Taro, and a daughter, Yoshiko.

He is the grandfather of the Japanese-American figure skater Kyoko Ina, Yoshiko's daughter.

House of Representatives (Japan)
Preceded by Saburo Ogoshi	Chair, Committee on Foreign Affairs of the House of Representatives of Japan; 1949–1950	Succeeded by Goro Morishima
Political offices
Preceded by Kaneshichi Masuda	Chief Cabinet Secretary; 1950–1951	Succeeded by Shigeru Hori
Preceded by Shigeru Yoshida	Minister for Foreign Affairs; 1952–1954	Succeeded by Mamoru Shigemitsu
Government offices
New office	Director, Intelligence and Analysis Service of the Ministry for Foreign Affairs of Japan; 1945	Succeeded by Shoji Ogata
Diplomatic posts
Consulate evacuated	Japanese Consul General to Guangzhou; 1939–1941	Succeeded by Nagao Kita
Preceded by Akiyoshi Tajiri	Japanese Consul General to Hong Kong; 1940–1942	Succeeded by Seiki Yano
N/A	Japanese Consul General to Kolkata; 1941	Office abolished
Preceded by Koto Matsudaira	Japanese Ambassador to the United Nations; 1961–63	Succeeded by Akira Matsui
