= Athletics at the 1925 Far Eastern Championship Games =

VII Far Eastern Championship Games
- Dates: May
- Host city: Manila, Philippines
- Events: 19
- Participation: 3 nations

The athletics events at the May 1925 Far Eastern Championship Games were held in Manila, Philippines. A total of 19 men's athletics events were contested at the competition. It was the first time that track events at this competition were conducted over the international standard metric distances, changing from the imperial distances that previously featured at the competition.

The Philippines returned to the top of the medal table in the athletics programme. The hosts won all but six of the nineteen events, placed in the top two in 16 of them, and completed medal sweeps in seven events. Japan was the next most successful nation, with five gold medals and medal sweeps in the triple jump and 1500 metres. China again performed poorly, matching their previous haul of two athletics medals of one gold and one bronze medal.

Fortunato Catalon aimed for a fifth straight sprint double, but teammate David Nepomuceno—who became the first Filipino Olympian a year earlier—defeated Catalon in the 200 metres title. Two other Filipinos defended their titles from 1923: Regino Birtulfo in the discus and Juan Taduran in the decathlon. Mikio Oda of Japan was the only other athlete to repeat as champion, retaining his triple jump crown. Chūhei Nambu followed in his compatriot's footsteps by taking medals in high, long and triple jump at one games. Both Oda and Nambu would go on to win Olympic triple jump titles (in 1928 and 1932, respectively). Wu Topan was China's only winner in the pentathlon.

Generoso Rabaya of the Philippines was the only athlete to claim two titles in the athletics and did so with an unusual combination of 110 metres hurdles and shot put (taking advantage of the lighter Asian implements in use).

== Medal summary ==
Event	Gold		Silver		Bronze	
100 metres	Fortunato Catalon (PHI)	11.1	David Nepomuceno (PHI)	???	Sasago Tani (JPN)	???
200 metres straight	David Nepomuceno (PHI)	22.5	Fortunato Catalon (PHI)	???	Cirilo Perez (PHI)	???
400 metres	Francisco Danao (PHI)	51.2	Crispin Garcia (PHI)	???	Roger Paredes (PHI)	???
800 metres	Yukiyoshi Kuwata (JPN)	2:01.7	Tokushige Noto (JPN)	???	Juan Taduran (PHI)	???
1500 metres	Shomon Nawada (JPN)	4:07.8	Hidesuburo Sato (JPN)	???	Takaharu Yoneda (JPN)	???
10,000 metres	Julian Musne (PHI)	36:07.5	Ramon Soriano (PHI)	???	Zhu Yaoxie (CHN)	???
110 m hurdles	Generoso Rabaya (PHI)	15.9	Paulino Fernandez (PHI)	???	Pedro Abiera (PHI)	???
200 m hurdles straight	Pedro Abiera (PHI)	25.7	Sotero Binongcal (PHI)	???	Antonio Nicanor (PHI)	???
4 × 200 m relay	Japan (JPN)	1:30.3	Philippines (PHI)	???	Only two finishers	
4 × 400 m relay	Japan (JPN)	3:25.8	Philippines (PHI)	???	Only two finishers	
High jump	Eliseo Razo (PHI)	1.835 m	Chūhei Nambu (JPN)	1.81 m	Rufino Ico (PHI)	1.785 m
Pole vault	Antonio Alo (PHI) Numeriano Tagavilla (PHI)	3.415 m	Not awarded		Carlos Mejillano (PHI) Miguel Sujeco (PHI)	3.35 m
Long jump	Generoso Rivera (PHI)	6.89 m	Silvestre Driz (PHI)	6.83 m	Chūhei Nambu (JPN)	6.69 m
Triple jump	Mikio Oda (JPN)	14.08 m	Chūhei Nambu (JPN)	14.00 m	Takeo Kobayashi (JPN)	13.97 m
Shot put	Generoso Rabaya (PHI)	14.23 m	Yasuyuki Fujita (JPN)	14.02 m	Arturo Roa (PHI)	13.68 m
Discus throw	Regino Birtulfo (PHI)	37.40 m	Yasuyuki Fujita (JPN)	36.93 m	Yoshio Okita (JPN)	34.97 m
Javelin throw	Rufino Ico (PHI)	51.71 m	Arturo Roa (PHI)	51.60 m	Agripino Sevilla (PHI)	51.12 m
Pentathlon	Wu Topan (CHN)	2430 pts	Francisco Danao (PHI)	2428 pts	Rufino Ico (PHI)	2325 pts
Decathlon	Juan Taduran (PHI)	5042 pts	Paulino Fernandez (PHI)	4959 pts	John Tatom (PHI)	4741 pts
