= David Nepomuceno =

Filipino sprinter (1900–1939)

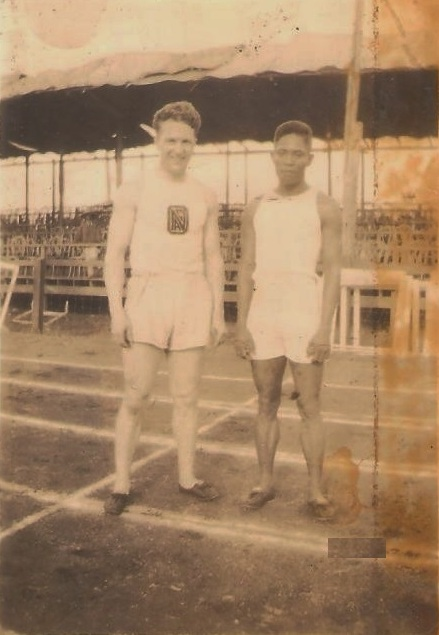
- Loren Murchison (left) and David Nepomuceno (right) at the 1924 Summer Olympics in Paris

Personal information
- Nationality: Filipino
- Born: May 9, 1900 Oas, Albay, Philippine Islands
- Died: September 27, 1939 (aged 39) Manila, Philippine Commonwealth
- Height: 5 ft 7 in (170 cm)
- Weight: 179 lb (81 kg)

Sport
- Country: Philippines
- Sport: Track and field
- Event(s): 100m, 200m
Medal record
Men's athletics
Representing the Philippines
Far Eastern Championship Games
Gold medal – first place	1925 Manila	200 m
Silver medal – second place	1925 Manila	100 m
Gold medal – first place	1927 China	100 m
Bronze medal – third place	1927 China	200 m

David Ramos Nepomuceno (May 9, 1900 – September 27, 1939) was the first Filipino to compete in the Olympics. He was a runner and the sole representative of the Philippines at the 1924 Summer Olympics in Paris, France. Nepomuceno also served as a sailor in the United States Navy and died in the line of duty. In 1925, Nepomuceno ran the 100 meters in only two-tenths of a second short of the then-world record.

== Early athletic career ==
Nepomuceno specialized in 100 meter sprints. Along with fellow Filipino Fortunato Catalon, he was considered a world-class sprinter in the 1920s, competing frequently in the Far East.

== The Olympics ==
When the Philippines joined the International Olympic Committee in 1918, the requisite for the country's acceptance was the participation of a Filipino athlete at the 1924 Olympic Games in Paris, France. To qualify, Nepomuceno ran the 100 yards in 9.45 seconds, a fifth of a second of the world record at the time. He was the sole participant representing the Philippines, making him the first Filipino to compete in the Olympics. He was accompanied by National Physical Director Dr. Regino Ylanan, who also served as his coach.

To get to the Olympics, Nepomuceno and Ylanan had to travel by steamboat from Manila to Marseilles for 33 days. They then took a train to Paris, arriving a week before the opening ceremonies. Since he was the only athlete competing, he was the Philippines' flagbearer. With the Philippines still a US colony at the time, the French Olympic Committee made him carry two flags: the American on top and the Philippine flag at the bottom. At 24 years old, he was the first Filipino and the first Southeast Asian to participate in the opening ceremonies.

At the Olympics, he ran the 100-meter and 200-meter dashes; in neither race was he fast enough to qualify for the quarterfinals. Many factors went into why he couldn't advance: the long travel time by sea, the short preparation time, having to carry two heavy flags before running. In a magazine interview, he was quoted "Sana yung mga susunod sa akin ay hindi maranasan ang naranasan ko (I hope those who come after me will not experience what I experienced)”. That would be the only Olympics he competed in.

== Far Eastern Games ==
After the Olympics, Nepomuceno ran for several more years. In 1925, he nearly shattered the world record for the 100 meters, finishing just two-tenths of a second behind the then-record holder, Charley Paddock.

Nepomuceno won the following medals at the Far Eastern Games:

1925

- Gold Medal, 200 meter straight dash
- Silver Medal, 100 meter dash

1927

- Gold Medal, 100 meter dash
- Bronze Medal, 200 meter straight dash

== Personal life ==
Nepomuceno served in the US Army’s Philippine Scouts and joined the United States Navy.

Nepomuceno had only one child, Crisogono. Crisogono became a track and field official. Crisogono went on to have two sons, Joseph and Da Vinci, and many more descendants.

Nepomuceno died on September 27, 1939, at the age of 39, while on duty.

== See also ==
- Fortunato Catalon
- Regino Ylanan
