= Hasumi =

Hasumi (written: 蓮見, 蓮實 or 羽住) is a Japanese surname. Notable people with the surname include:

- Eiichirō Hasumi (羽住 英一郎, born 1967), Japanese film director
- Saburo Hasumi (蓮見 三郎, 1896–?), Japanese middle-distance runner
- Tomohiro Hasumi (蓮見 知弘, born 1972), Japanese footballer

Hasumi (written: 葉純) is also a feminine Japanese given name. Notable people with the name include:

- Hasumi Ishigooka (石郷岡 葉純, born 1996), Japanese curler

== Fictional characters ==
- Hasumi Hanekawa, a character in the role-playing video game Blue Archive
- Hasumi Hitokawa, a character in the manga series A Certain Scientific Accelerator
- Hasumi Nagatomi, a character in the video game The Idolmaster Cinderella Girls

== See also ==
- Hasumi, Shimane, a former village in Shimane Prefecture, Japan
