= Athletics at the 1915 Far Eastern Championship Games =

II Far Eastern Championship Games
- Dates: May 1915
- Host city: Shanghai, China
- Events: 17
- Participation: 3 nations

At the 1915 Far Eastern Championship Games, the athletics events were held in Shanghai, China in May. A total of seventeen events were contested in the men-only competition.

== Medal summary ==
Event	Gold		Silver		Bronze	
100 yards	Genaro Saavedra (PHI)	10.6	G. Quintana (PHI)	???	Nicolas Llaneta (PHI)	???
220 yards straight	Nicolas Llaneta (PHI)	24.2	G. Quintana (PHI)	???	Pio Robillos (PHI)	???
440 yards	Li Rusong (CHN)	54.0	Li Wongchang (CHN)	???	G. Rivera (PHI)	???
880 yards	Guo Yubin (CHN)	2:06.6	Gishiro Taku (JPN)	???	Li Wongchang (CHN)	???
One mile	Guo Yubin (CHN)	4:50.8	Li Wongchang (CHN)	???	Chiu Cang (CHN)	???
Eight miles (road)	Gishiro Taku (JPN)	47:16	Pai Paokun (CHN)	???	Kinji Takatsu (JPN)	???
120 yd hurdles	Huang Yuandao (CHN)	17.4	Chang Chingfu (CHN)	???	Constantino Rabaya (PHI)	???
220 yd hurdles straight	Jose Lozada (PHI)	28.2	Huang Yuandao (CHN)	???	Chang Chingfu (CHN)	???
High jump	Genaro Saavedra (PHI)	1.69 m	Cui J. (CHN) Lin D.Y. (CHN)	??? m	Not awarded	
Pole vault	Genaro Saavedra (PHI)	3.13 m	Huang Yuandao (CHN)	??? m	Kuo Chiaoyen (CHN)	??? m
Long jump	C. Cardenas (PHI)	6.65 m	Huang Yuandao (CHN)	??? m	Genaro Saavedra (PHI)	??? m
Shot put	Regino Ylanan (PHI)	10.91 m	Kao Wuyang (CHN)	??? m	A. Percha (PHI)	??? m
Discus throw	Emilio Samson (PHI)	31.82 m	Ji Ziying (CHN)	??? m	A. Percha (PHI)	??? m
Pentathlon	Chi Cuin (CHN)	341 pts	Lu Sungwun (CHN)	300 pts	Regino Ylanan (PHI)	288 pts
Decathlon	Genaro Saavedra (PHI)	711 pts	Li D.S. (CHN)	642 pts	Huang Yuandao (CHN)	636 pts
4×220 yd relay	Philippines (PHI)	1:36.6	China (CHN)	???	Only two finishers	
4×400 yd relay	Japan (JPN)	3:42.2	Philippines (PHI)	???	China (CHN)	???

== Medal table ==
* Host nation (China)

Rank	Nation	Gold	Silver	Bronze	Total
1	Philippines (PHI)	10	3	9	22
2	China (CHN)*	5	13	6	24
3	Japan (JPN)	2	2	0	4
Totals (3 entries)		17	18	15	50
