= Athletics at the 1923 Far Eastern Championship Games =

VI Far Eastern Championship Games
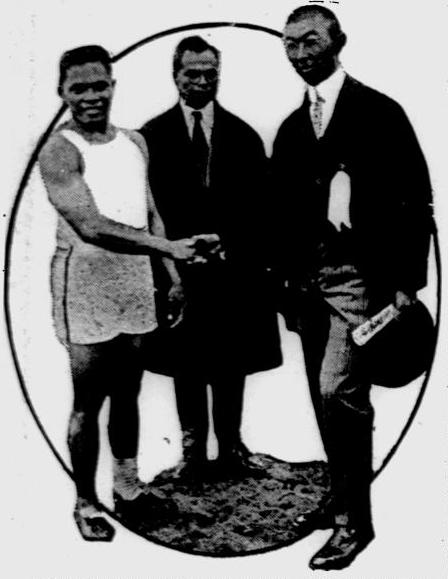
- Sprint champion Catalon (left) shakes hands with Prince Chichibu at the games
- Dates: May 1923
- Host city: Osaka, Japan
- Events: 19
- Participation: 3 nations

At the 1923 Far Eastern Championship Games, the athletics events were held in Osaka, Japan in May. A total of 19 men's athletics events were contested at the competition. It was the last time that track events were conducted over imperial distances, as the competition aligned with international standards in 1925 and began using metric distances. The triple jump event was contested for the first time.

Japan was the foremost nation in the athletics competition on this occasion. The hosts won twelve of the nineteen events and had a gold or silver medallist in all but three of the contests. This included a complete medal sweep of all middle- and long-distance track events. The Philippines, the champions at the previous edition, won six gold medals and ten silver medals. The Chinese had their worst showing yet in athletics, managing just two medals. As last place finishers, they received a bronze for the 220-yard relay. Yu Huaian was their only individual medallist, although he performed well by winning the high jump in a games record.

Fortunato Catalon extended his run of victories in both the 100 and 220-yard sprints, becoming double sprint champion for a fourth time in a row. Katsuo Okazaki, defended his mile run title and went one better than his 1923 880-yards runner-up finish to achieve a middle-distance double. He later represented Japan at the 1924 Summer Olympics and went on to become the Japanese Minister of Foreign Affairs. Mikio Oda emerged as a top international athlete with wins in the long jump and triple jump, as well as a high jump bronze. He would later go on to become the first individual Olympic champion from Asia at the 1928 Amsterdam Olympics. Yonetaro Nakazawa, the pole vault winner here, was Japan's flag bearer at that games.

Japan's Nobuyuki Yoshioka defended his title in the five-mile run from the 1921 games and Filipino decathlete Juan Taduran also achieved that feat in his event.

== Medal summary ==
Event	Gold		Silver		Bronze	
100 yards	Fortunato Catalon (PHI)	10.4	Seisei Takagi (JPN)	???	Noriji Omura (JPN)	???
220 yards straight	Fortunato Catalon (PHI)	22.2	Seisei Takagi (JPN)	???	Noriji Omura (JPN)	???
440 yards	Tokushige Noto (JPN)	52.0	Francisco Danao (PHI)	???	Valentin Malinao (PHI) Hideo Matsushige (JPN)	???
880 yards	Katsuo Okazaki (JPN)	2:02.2	Kikuo Toda (JPN)	???	Tokushige Noto (JPN)	???
One mile	Katsuo Okazaki (JPN)	4:39.4	Shigeharu Goyoda (JPN)	???	Hidesuburo Sato (JPN)	???
Five miles	Nobuyuki Yoshioka (JPN)	27:07.0	Kenichi Shimo (JPN)	???	Shomon Nawada (JPN)	???
120 yd hurdles	Paulino Fernandez (PHI)	17.2	Joichi Enohara (JPN)	???	Pedro Abiera (PHI)	???
220 yd hurdles straight	Emilio Bucoy (PHI)	27.4	Juan Escamos (PHI)	???	Shozo Matsukawa (JPN)	???
4×220 yd relay	Japan (JPN)	1:33.2	Philippines (PHI)	???	China (CHN)	???
4×400 yd relay	Japan (JPN)	3:32.8	Philippines (PHI)	???	Only 2 finishers	
High jump	Yu Huaian (CHN)	1.75 m	Rufino Nollido (PHI)	1.72 m	Mikio Oda (JPN)	1.70 m
Pole vault	Yonetaro Nakazawa (JPN)	3.40 m	Antonio Alo (PHI)	3.32 m	Mala (PHI)	3.32 m
Long jump	Mikio Oda (JPN)	6.90 m	Simon Santos (PHI)	6.88 m	Sogo Omoto (JPN)	6.80 m
Triple jump	Mikio Oda (JPN)	14.27 m	Aguedo Torres (PHI)	13.24 m	Simon Santos (PHI)	13.20 m
Shot put	Tadaomi Futamura (JPN)	13.71 m	Arturo Roa (PHI)	13.03 m	Sebastian Santos (PHI)	12.99 m
Discus throw	Regino Birtulfo (PHI)	36.46 m	Yoshio Okita (JPN)	35.64 m	Kaizo Ito (JPN)	34.78 m
Javelin throw	Katsuji Iwai (JPN)	50.78 m	Santoku Fukuma (JPN)	49.98 m	Emilio Silverio (PHI)	49.16 m
Pentathlon	Seiichi Ueda (JPN)	15 pts	Hiroshi Masuda (JPN)	18 pts	Francisco Danao (PHI)	19 pts
Decathlon	Juan Taduran (PHI)	5211 pts	Juan Escamos (PHI)	5002 pts	Hiroshi Masuda (JPN)	4993 pts
