= Felipe Monserrat =

Filipino sports administrator

5th President of the Philippine Amateur Athletic Federation
- In office 1968–1970
- Preceded by: Antonio de las Alas
- Succeeded by: Ambrosio Padilla

President of the Philippine Football Association
- In office 1962–1967

Personal details
- Born: January 6, 1923 Manila, Philippines
- Died: October 18, 2018 (aged 95) Los Angeles, California, United States

Felipe Monserrat was a Filipino sports administrator who served as president of the Philippine Amateur Athletic Federation (PAAF) from 1968 to 1970.

== Career ==
Felipe Monserrat headed the Philippine Amateur Athletic Federation (PAAF). After leading the Philippine delegation for the 1968 Summer Olympics in Mexico, he succeeded Antonio de las Alas as PAAF president. He earned a fresh mandate after he was re-elected in 1970 but he resigned "out of frustration".

As president of the Association for the Advancement of Amateur Athletics lobbied the Congress for the passage of Republic Act No. 3135 which grants autonomy to national sports associations and decentralized the PAAF. The law was passed into law in 1962. The PAAF would later become the Philippine Olympic Committee after it was dissolved in 1974.

He was also the president of the Philippine Football Association for two terms serving from 1962 to 1967. Under his term, the Philippines would host the 1966 AFC Youth Championship. He was also convinced by sponsor San Miguel Corporation of Andrés Soriano to hire British coaches Alan Rogers and Brian Birch to handle the Philippine national team after a poor performance in the 1962 Asian Games.

== Later life ==
He moved to the United States with his family in 1984 and stopped his involvement in Philippine sports due to "politics". Monserrat would die on October 18, 2018, in his residence in Los Angeles. He was married to Natividad Larena with whom he had five children.
