= Philippine Amateur Athletic Federation =

Governing Body of Sports

- Logo
- Abbreviation: PAAF
- Successor: Philippine Olympic Committee
- Formation: 1911
- Dissolved: 1975
- Region served: Philippines
- President: First: William Forbes; Last: Ambrosio Padilla

The Philippine Amateur Athletic Federation (PAAF) was the governing body of sports in the Philippines and the predecessor of the Philippine Olympic Committee.

== History ==
The Philippine Amateur Athletic Federation was organized in a permanent basis in 1911 as a result of the gaining of foothold of athletics in the Philippine Islands which was caused by American influence since 1899. The early proponents of the PAAF meant not only to promote athletics in the whole archipelago but in the whole Far East. The PAAF formed a committee in 1912, composed of Frank L. Crone, Elwood Stanley Brown and William Tutherly, for this purpose.

The PAAF was instrumental to the organization of the Far Eastern Athletic Association (FEAA) and launched the inaugural edition of the Far Eastern Championship Games in 1913. Succeeding editions of the Games would be hosted by the Philippines, China and Japan until 1934.

The first Filipino Olympian was David Nepomuceno who participated in Athletics in the 100m and 200m sprints events at the 1924 Summer Olympics in Paris. However it was only in 1929 when the International Olympic Committee recognized the PAAF as the Philippines' National Olympic Committee. The recognition was a year after swimmer Teofilo Yldefonso won the Philippines' first Olympic medal—a bronze in the 200 meters breaststroke event at the 1928 Summer Olympics in Amsterdam.

With the approval of the Republic Act No. 3135 which revised the Charter of the PAAF on June 17, 1961, the PAAF became a public corporation.

In 1975 the PAAF was renamed to Philippine Olympic Committee (POC) after the establishment of the Department of Youth and Sports Development which effectively abolished the former.

== Leadership ==
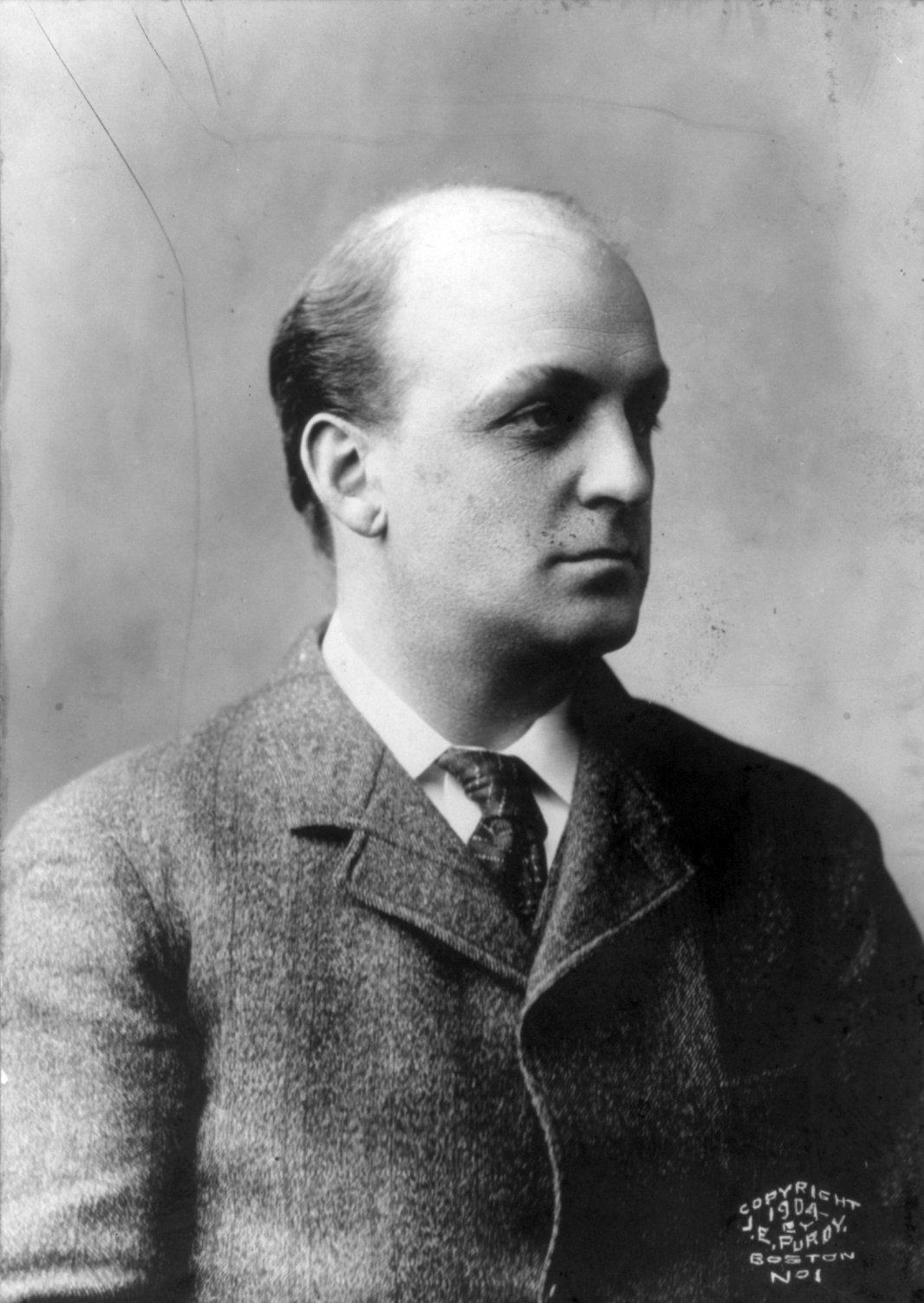
William Cameron Forbes, the first president of the Philippine Amateur Athletic Federation.

The founding president of the PAAF was Governor-General William Cameron Forbes. The first elected Filipino president of the sports body was then Senator Manuel L. Quezon who succeeded Forbes and served from 1916 to 1935. The last president of the PAAF was Ambrosio Padilla who served as PAAF president until 1975 when PAAF was renamed as the Philippine Olympic Committee (POC). Padilla served as the first president of the POC from 1975 until 1976.

List of presidents
	President	Term	
	President	From	To
1	William Cameron Forbes	1911	1916
2	Manuel L. Quezon	1916	1935
3	Jorge B. Vargas	1936	1955
4	Antonio de las Alas	1956	1968
5	Felipe Monserrat	1969	1970
6	Ambrosio Padilla	1970	1975
