= Athletics at the 1913 Far Eastern Championship Games =

I Far Eastern Championship Games
- Dates: February 1913
- Host city: Manila, Philippines
- Venue: Manila Carnival Grounds
- Events: 17
- Participation: 3 nations

At the 1913 Far Eastern Championship Games, the athletics events were held in Manila, Philippines in February. A total of seventeen events were contested in the men-only competition.

== Medal summary ==
Event	Gold		Silver		Bronze	
100 yards	Pio Robillos (PHI)	10.8	Jose Lozada (PHI)	???	Numeriano Rojas (PHI)	???
200 yards straight	Pio Robillos (PHI)	23.6	G. Quintana (PHI)	???	Yao Kaycheung (CHN)	???
440 yards	Vicente Macairan (PHI)	56.2	Victorino Abrera (PHI)	???	Hu Manfai (CHN)	???
880 yards	Paulino Sumarinas (PHI)	2:16.2	?. Villarina (PHI)	???	Ye Qifu (CHN)	???
One mile	Zenji Inakagata (JPN)	5:05.2	Lu Mingyi (CHN)	???	Maximo Borja (PHI)	???
Five miles (road)	Zenji Inakagata (JPN)	29:42	Teruji Inoue (JPN)	32:45	Li Wencheng (CHN)	???
120 yd hurdles	Wei Huizhang (CHN)	18.0	Huang Yuandao (CHN)		Only two finishers	
220 yd hurdles straight	Jose Lozada (PHI)	28.8	Wei Xianzhang (CHN)	???	Jose M., Ebro (PHI)	???
High jump	Wei Xianzhang (CHN)	1.66 m	?. Salcedo (PHI)	??? m	?. Aliermo (PHI)	1.62 m
Pole vault	Remigio Abad (PHI)	3.22 m	Yang Kinkwei (CHN)	??? m	Clarence Chow (CHN)	??? m
Long jump	Chen Yan (CHN)	6.07 m	C. Cardenas (PHI)	??? m	Pan Wenbing (CHN)	??? m
Shot put	Regino Ylanan (PHI)	10.76 m	Edward Kao (CHN)	??? m	J. Coscuella (PHI)	??? m
Discus throw	Regino Ylanan (PHI)	28.28 m	Emilio Samson (PHI)	??? m	Felix Rosardo (PHI)	??? m
Pentathlon	Regino Ylanan (PHI)	266 pts	Pan Wenbing (CHN)	262 pts	Paulino Sumarinas (PHI)	249 pts
Decathlon	Pan Wenbing (CHN)	598 pts	Clarence Chow (CHN)	555 pts	Margarito Torralba (PHI)	488 pts
4×220 yd relay	Philippines (PHI)	1:38.8	China (CHN)	???	Japan (JPN)	???
4×400 yd relay	Philippines (PHI)	3:50.0	China (CHN)	???	Only two finishers	

== Medal table ==
* Host nation (Philippines)

Rank	Nation	Gold	Silver	Bronze	Total
1	Philippines (PHI)*	11	7	8	26
2	China (CHN)	4	9	6	19
3	Japan (JPN)	2	1	1	4
Totals (3 entries)		17	17	15	49
