= Elwood Brown =

American sports administrator and basketball coach

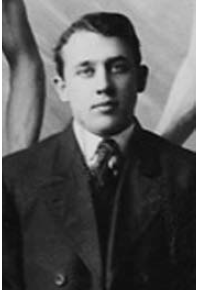

Biographical details
- Born: April 9, 1883; Cherokee, Iowa, U.S.
- Died: March 24, 1924 (aged 40); Englewood, New Jersey, U.S.

Coaching career (HC unless noted)
- 1903–1906: Wheaton (IL)
- 1905–1906: Illinois

Head coaching record
- Overall: 33–30–1

Elwood Stanley Brown (April 9, 1883 – March 24, 1924) was an American sports administrator, and basketball coach. As a leader in the YMCA, he promoted sports in the Philippines, helped establish the Far Eastern Games, and founded the first Boy Scout troops in the Philippines. He also helped organize the American Expeditionary Forces Games and the Inter-Allied Games. Brown worked closely with Pierre de Coubertin and the International Olympic Committee in propagating the Olympic Games through the YMCA.

== Involvement in sports ==
- Brown joined the YMCA in 1892, and stayed for life. At the Chicago YMCA, he assisted Physical Director George Wolf Ehler, 1898–1903. Brown then studied at Wheaton College in Illinois, where he was also a basketball player and coach (1904 and 1905 seasons), but could not complete his course due to financial constraints. He next served as coach of the University of Illinois at Urbana-Champaign basketball team for the 1905–06 season, then was hired as Chicago YMCA Physical Director in 1906. In 1907, he became Physical Director of the Salt Lake City YMCA, serving until the start of 1910.
- Offered the job of Physical Director of the Manila YMCA, Brown moved to the US Philippine Islands in January 1910 and immediately introduced basketball and volleyball. (Since then, the Philippines has become a regional power in men's basketball.)
- In the summers of 1910 and 1911 (mid-February to late May), by request of Governor-General William Cameron Forbes, Brown set up a sports program for Filipino insular government employees at the summer capital of Baguio, a hugely successful project that favorably impressed the Governor. After he was appointed Chairman of the Playground Commission by Gov. Forbes, Brown set up a network of public playgrounds in Manila.
- In November 1910, Brown proposed the establishment of the Philippine Amateur Athletic Federation (PAAF) which was founded in January 1911 with Gov. Forbes as president and Brown as the Secretary. Simultaneously, various sports bodies for individual sports were organised under the PAAF umbrella. The PAAF was recognized in 1929 by the International Olympic Committee as the Philippine Olympic authority, and later changed its name to Philippine Olympic Committee in 1975.
- In 1911 Brown became director of athletics at the famous Manila Carnival. The Carnival was an exposition and festival showcasing American and Philippine culture, commerce, industry, politics, military, and tourism, would last from 1908 to 1939, and would be copied by other cities and towns across the islands. Brown used the Carnival to promote sports in Asia. In the same year, the Philippine Amateur Athletic Federation invited foreign participation at the Manila Carnival games.
- In September 1912, Brown proposed the organization of a "Far Eastern Olympic Games" during the 1913 Manila Carnival, that resulted in the formation of the Far Eastern Olympic Association, with Gov. Forbes as president and Brown as Secretary-General (1912–January 1918), and the holding of the Far Eastern Olympic Games, January–February 1913. (In 1915, the names were changed to Far Eastern Athletic Association and Far Eastern Championship Games. With the help of Franklin Brown of the Tokyo YMCA, Japan, negatively influenced by Kanō Jigorō, reluctantly joined the Far Eastern Games. The Games met regularly until 1934, when the politico-military situation in East Asia destroyed the momentum of international cooperative endeavors.)

- Brown collaborated with J. Howard Crocker and YMCA from missionaries in China, Japan and the Philippines, to establish the Far Eastern Championship Games.
- "Under the directorship of Elwood Brown, the YMCA transformed the Manila Carnival from a commercial exhibition to an athletic spectacle. The carnival achieved recognition as the Far East Olympics with the inclusion of teams from Japan and China in 1913." – Gerald Gems in Journal of Sport History, Spring 2006.

- With the collaboration of Everett Stanton Turner (a YMCA stalwart of education, sports, and Scouting in the Philippines), Brown and the YMCA injected sports into the Philippine education curriculum.
- A full account of the historical influence of Brown's organizing efforts in Asia is the article "Muscular Christianity and the “Western Civilizing Mission”: Elwood S. Brown, the YMCA, and the Idea of the Far Eastern Championship Games" by Stefan Hübner in Diplomatic History, 39.3, December 9, 2013, pp 532–537. The abstract of the article describes Brown as "one of the most important promoters of muscular Christianity and “Olympism” during that period."
- In 1918 towards the end of World War I, Brown proposed and organised the holding of the American Expeditionary Forces Championships and the consequential Inter-Allied Games and the construction of the Stade Pershing named after AEF commander John Joseph Pershing (an old acquaintance of Brown's in the Philippines) who appointed Brown as Director-General of the Inter-Allied Games.
- In 1920 Brown, representing the International Olympic Committee and the YMCA, traveled through South America and organised the South American Athletic Federation.
- Brown addressed the International Olympic Committee three times: at Antwerp (1920), Lausanne (1921), and Paris (1922). At the 1920 meeting in Antwerp, Belgium, Brown broached the idea of holding a "Hindu Games" in India.

== Involvement in Scouting ==
- As the physical director of the Manila YMCA, Elwood Brown also became the Philippines' first Scoutmaster, organizing the very first Boy Scout troops in 1910. Not surprisingly, Brown then involved the Boy Scouts in social service in the Manila Carnival. (Arguably, a part of his Scouting legacy is the Boy Scouts of the Philippines which was inaugurated in 1938 and has since become one of the largest Scout associations in the world.)
- Brown wrote to Boy Scouts of America Honorary President Theodore Roosevelt about the Manila Boy Scouts serving at the 1910 Manila Carnival and the "Great Fire in Manila. Brown's letter was extensively quoted in Roosevelt's letter, dated July 1911, to BSA Executive Secretary James Edward West. The BSA published the entire text of Roosevelt's letter in the 1911 first edition of the Official Handbook for Boys. (See at Gutenberg.)
- Portions of Roosevelt's quote of Brown's letter have been reprinted (before and after the publication of the Official Handbook for Boys) in New Castle News (26 May 1911), the Corsicana Daily Sun (31 May 1911), Boys' Life (Vol. I, No. 5, July 1911, page 33), The Washington Post (8 August 1911), The Youngstown Daily Vindicator (23 August 1911), The Miami Metropolis (20 September 1911, page 3), and the BSP book On My Honor (2001). The Boys' Life bit, "Philippine Boy Scouts," reports: "Proof of the value of the Boy Scouts comes from Manila, Philippine Islands, the outpost of the Boy Scout movement. Elwood E. Brown who has organized the Boy Scouts in the Philippines, has written a letter to the national headquarters of the Boy Scouts of America, telling of the assistance which the Manila Boy Scouts gave recently at a fire in Manila." The Miami Metropolis article "Boy Scouts Work with the Firemen Just Like Heroes", reported that it was "Elwood E. Brown, organizer in the Philippines" who had written to Roosevelt.
- The Annual Report of the Boy Scouts of America, February 8, 1912, page 8 indicated that there were three Scoutmasters in the Philippine Islands as of January 1, 1912. The three Scouting organizers in the Philippines at that time on record were Elwood Stanley Brown, Mark Thompson, and George H. Mummert.
- During his world tour, Boy Scouts Founder, Sir Robert Stephenson Baden-Powell, sent back to London articles for publication in the British Scouting periodical The Scout. In issue no. 224, 27 July 1912, in the article "In the Cannibal Islands," Baden-Powell made a brief narration about his trip to Manila. He mentioned "Boy Scouts of the Philippines" and that he had been met by a "Guard of Honour." He quoted Brown's and Roosevelt's letters about the Manila fire and the Manila Carnival in which Manila Scouts rendered service. In the article, Baden-Powell urged his young British readers "to get into correspondence with your brother Scouts in Manila… The Chief Scoutmaster is Mr. Elwood Brown, Y.M.C.A., Manila."

== Later life ==
Brown died of complications from a heart attack on March 24, 1924, at age 40.

== Bibliography ==
- Boy Scouts of the Philippines, On My Honor: Stories of Scouts in Action, Manila: Boy Scouts of the Philippines, 2001.

Contains full text of Roosevelt letter to James West – received by the BSP National Office from the BSA.

- Buchanan, Ian (Fall 1998). "Elwood S. Brown: Missionary Extraordinary" (PDF). Journal of Olympic History: 12–13. Archived from the original (PDF) on September 19, 2016.

Contains details of Brown's work with the International Olympic Committee and some details about the Inter-Allied Games.

- Clymer, Kenton, Protestant Missionaries in the Philippines, 1898-1916, Urbana: University of Illinois Press, 1986. ISBN 978-0252012105.
- England, Frederick, "History of the Far Eastern Athletic Association" in Official Bulletin of the International Olympic Committee, No. 2282, Lausanne, Switzerland, 1926, pages 18–19.

England arrived in the Philippines after Elwood Brown requested the government for a playground supervisor. England became Manila school's superintendent and Manila playground director. He was appointed as the first Philippine physical director in 1922, and was later succeeded by Regino Ylanan. England authored Physical Education: A Manual for Teachers, published by the Bureau of Education and Bureau of Printing, Manila.

- Huebner, Stefan, 2016, Pan-Asian Sports and the Emergence of Modern Asia, 1913–1974, Singapore: National University of Singapore Press, 2016. ISBN 978-981-4722-03-2

Contains a detailed narrative of Brown and the YMCA's extensive work in propagating sports among Filipinos through the Philippine educational system and his massive influence in international sports competition in Asia.

- Johnson, Wait & Elwood Brown, Official Athletic Almanac of the American Expeditionary Forces 1919. A.E.F. Championships, Inter-Allied Games, New York: American Sports Publishing, 1919.
- Majumdar, Boria & Sandra Collins, eds, 2008, Olympism: The Global Vision, Oxford & New York City: Routledge, 2008. ISBN 978-0-415-42537-7.

Contains numerous references to Brown, his coordination with Baron de Coubertin, the Inter-Allied Games, and Brown's organizing work in South America.

- Ylanan, Regino & Carmen Wilson Ylanan, The History and Development of Physical Education and Sports in the Philippines, Quezon City: University of the Philippines, 1965, 1974.

Regino Ylanan won medals at the 1913 and 1915 Far Eastern Championship Games, had trained at the International YMCA College, served as PAAF Secretary, succeeded Frederick England as Philippine physical director in 1927, and became board member of the Boy Scouts of America Philippine Islands Council No. 545 in 1928.

- "Spreading the Faith: The International YMCA," in The Olympic Century, Volume 5.

Contains detailed narratives of Brown's work in the Philippines and East Asia, and photographs of Brown.
