= Saburo Hasumi =

Japanese middle-distance runner

Personal information
- Nationality: Japanese
- Born: 23 January 1896

Sport
- Sport: Middle-distance running
- Event: 800 metres

Saburo Hasumi (蓮見 三郎, Hasumi Saburō; born 23 January 1896, date of death unknown) was a Japanese middle-distance runner. He competed in the men's 800 metres at the 1920 Summer Olympics.
