= Track and field official =

Sporting officials

Track and field athletics officials or track and field athletics technical officials are referees responsible for judging the various events within track and field. They can be sub-divided into four main groups: field judges, track judges, timekeepers, and starters. While most are versatile over the course of a season, they are given specific assignments to focus on during the course of a meet. At a high-level meet there might be, for example, an official to call the athletes and record their results, one or more officials to watch the circle or jumping line, one or more officials to mark the landing spot, one to operate a wind game and one to watch the time limit for the athlete. New electronic devices for timing, measurement or other technological operations might require additional specialists. And ultimately there is a referee to supervise that all are performing to the proper specifications according to the rules; and to make on the spot decisions when there is a controversial issue to settle.

Within the United Kingdom, athletics officials are governed by UK Athletics, within the United States, the supervising body is USATF. In other countries it is usually supervised by the National Governing Body to finish the race from start to end....etc..
