= Athletics pentathlon =

Combined track and field event

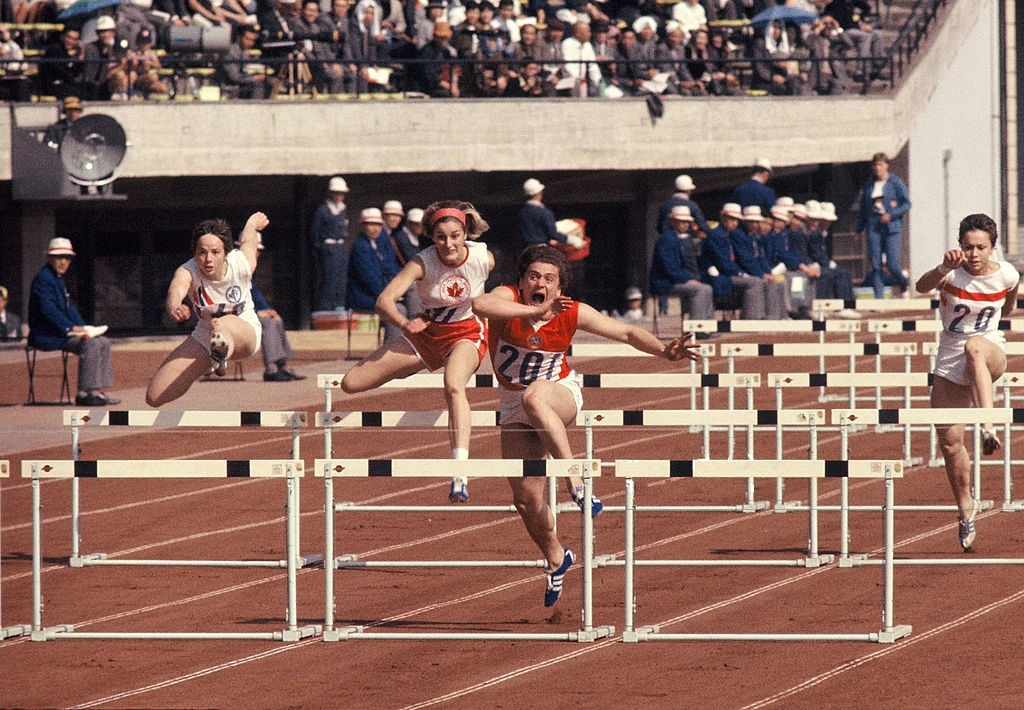
Hurdles event at the first Olympic women's pentathlon in 1964

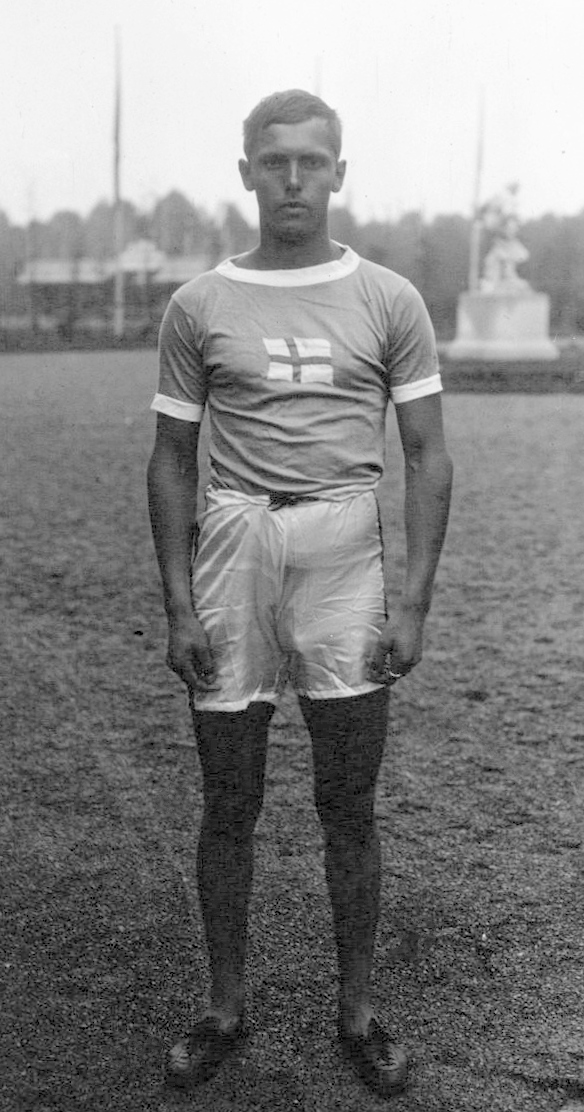
Eero Lehtonen, Olympic pentathlon champion in 1920

In the sport of athletics, pentathlons have taken various forms over the history of the sport, typically incorporating five track and field events. The only version of the event to remain at a high level of contemporary competition is the women's indoor pentathlon, which is present on the programme for the World Athletics Indoor Championships.

== Olympic athletics pentathlon ==
The athletics pentathlon featured on the Olympic Games schedule in two separate periods. During the early history of the event, an Olympic men's pentathlon was held and was present at the 1912, 1920 and 1924 games. The men's event was dropped, with the decathlon becoming the international standard. As women's events increasingly were contested internationally, the women's outdoor pentathlon was added and held for five straight editions from 1964 to 1980. The women's heptathlon superseded that event at international level in the early 1980s.

== Women's pentathlon ==
The International Women's Sports Federation was established in 1921 and the first reported women's pentathlon was in the 1922 Women's Olympiad in Monte Carlo. The events were 60 m, 300 m, high jump, two-hand javelin, and two-hand shot. In the late 1920s, the events were: shot and long jump on the first day, and 100 m, high jump, and javelin on the second day. The first world record recognised by the IAAF was set at the 1934 Women's World Games by Gisela Mauermayer. Prior to Olympic incorporation, the women's pentathlon featured at the AAA Championships, USA Outdoor Track and Field Championships and the Soviet Athletics Championships from the 1950s onwards.

== Youth athletics ==
The outdoor pentathlon is in common usage at lower age categories of the sport, allowing for easier training and event scheduling, and avoiding over-training of young athletes. For example, the lower division of the English Schools Combined Events Championships has pentathlons for both boys and girls. In high school athletics in North America, boys' and girls' pentathlons are held, consisting of the sprint hurdles, long jump, shot put, high jump, and an 800 m run (1500 m run for men). The pentathlon is used because it is less stressful on the athletes than a full multi and because many high school meets only last one day, it allows the event to be contested in the time limit.

== Throws pentathlon ==
Less common, but standardised internationally is the throws pentathlon. This contains field throwing events only: hammer throw, shot put, discus throw, javelin throw, and weight throw. Although it does not have a position in high-profile global athletics competitions, it is present on the programme for the World Masters Athletics Championships for both men and women. This event features at national level in many developed English-speaking nations.
