= 1913 Far Eastern Championship Games =

Multi-sport event in the Philippines

1st Far Eastern Championship Games
- Host city: Manila, Philippine Island
- Nations: 3
- Opening: 1 February 1913
- Closing: 9 February 1913
- Opened by: William Cameron Forbes; Governor General of the Philippines
- Main venue: Manila Carnival Grounds

The 1st Far Eastern Championship Games were held in 1–9 February 1913 in Manila, Philippines. The inaugural tournament was officially opened by Governor General William Cameron Forbes at the Carnival Grounds in Malate, Manila. Six countries participated at the tournament.

== Venues ==
- Carnival Grounds, Manila

== Participants ==
- Republic of China
- Philippine Island
- Japanese Empire

The Olympic Council of Asia also claimed that Federated Malay States, Siam, Hong Kong also took part in the event.

== Sports ==
- Athletics
- Baseball
- Basketball
- Diving
- Football
- Swimming
- Tennis
- Volleyball
