= 1919 Far Eastern Championship Games =

International multi-sport event

4th Far Eastern Championship Games
- Host city: Manila, Philippines
- Nations: 3
- Opening: 12 May 1919
- Closing: 16 May 1919

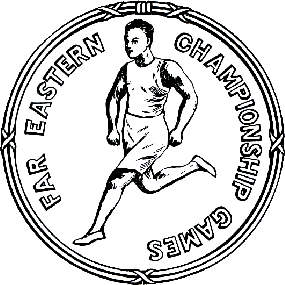
Logo of the games

The 1919 Far Eastern Games was the fourth edition of the regional multi-sport event, contested between China, Japan and the Philippines, and was held from 12 to 16 May 1919 in Manila, the Philippines. A total of eight sports were contested over the course of the five-day event.

In the football competition, China was represented by South China AA, a Hong Kong-based team.

== Participating nations ==
- Republic of China
- Japanese Empire
- Philippine Islands

== Sports ==
- Athletics
- Baseball
- Basketball
- Diving
- Football
- Swimming
- Tennis
- Volleyball
