= 1934 Far Eastern Championship Games =

Tenth and final edition of regional multi-sport event

10th Far Eastern Championship Games
- Host city: Manila, Philippines
- Nations: 4
- Opening: 16 May 1934
- Closing: 20 May 1934
- Main venue: Rizal Memorial Field

The 1934 Far Eastern Championship Games was the tenth edition of the regional multi-sport event, contested between China, Japan and the Philippines, and was held from 16 to 20 May in Manila, the Philippines. A total of eight sports were contested during the four-day competition. The Dutch East Indies (Indonesia) participated in the games, becoming only the second nation outside of the traditional three to send a delegation to the event (after India in 1930). The games were held at the then newly built sports complex, Rizal Memorial Field which was constructed on the former site of the Manila Carnival Grounds.

Official women's events were featured on the programme for the first time. Although some women's activities had been included since 1921, this marked the first occasion that women's sports were given parity with men's contest and was treated as part of the official medal count and points tables. The swimming programme featured at least four different events for women.

China won its ninth straight title in the football competition.

This was the last Far Eastern Championship Games. Poor relations between China and Japan disrupted the working of the Far Eastern Athletic Association (the organising body for the games). Before the games, Japanese delegations repeatedly suggested to the Chinese that Manchukuo compete as an independent team at the forthcoming competition. This greatly angered the Chinese, given that Manchukuo had been operated as a puppet state following the Japanese invasion of Manchuria in 1931. The 11th Far Eastern Championship Games was scheduled to be held in 1938 in Osaka, Japan, but was cancelled after the 1937 outbreak of the Second Sino-Japanese War. Given the warring of two of its three member nations, the Far Eastern Athletic Association was rendered defunct.

The holding of the first Western Asiatic Games in 1934 demonstrated an increasing desire for Asian-led international multi-sport events. Following the end of World War II, the Asian Games was created in 1951 and featured two of the former Far Eastern groups – Japan and the Philippines. Initially an event between Western-aligned nations, it was not until the 1974 Asian Games that China, Japan and the Philippines appeared together at the tournament, which came after a vote by the Asian Games Federation to exclude the Republic of China (Taiwan) in favour of the People's Republic of China.

== Participants ==
- Republic of China
- Dutch East Indies
- Japanese Empire
- Philippine Islands

French Indochina was also admitted to the Far Eastern Athletic Association. However, a few days before the event started, they withdrew due to a budget issue.

== Sports ==
- Athletics
- Baseball
- Basketball
- Diving
- Football
- Swimming
- Tennis
- Volleyball
