= 1915 Far Eastern Championship Games =

Multi-sport event held in Shanghai

2nd Far Eastern Championship Games
- Host city: Shanghai, China
- Nations: 3
- Opening: 15 May 1915
- Closing: 21 May 1915
- Opened by: Yuan Shikai; President of the Republic of China

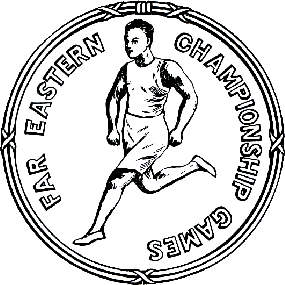
Logo of the games

The 1915 Far Eastern Championship Games was the second edition of the regional multi-sport event, contested between China, Japan and the Philippines, and was held from 15 to 22 May 1915 in Shanghai, Republic of China. A total of nine sports were contested – the inclusion of cycling increased the total from the eight held at the first edition. This marked the first time that the event was held under its Far Eastern Championship Games moniker, followed a change from the naming as the Oriental Olympic Games in 1913.

In the football competition, China was represented by South China AA, a Hong Kong–based team. YMCA leader J. Howard Crocker served as manager of the Republic of China team at the 1915 Far Eastern Championship Games.

== Participating nations ==
- Republic of China
- Japanese Empire
- Philippine Islands

== Sports ==
- Athletics
- Baseball
- Basketball
- Cycling
- Diving
- Football
- Swimming
- Tennis
- Volleyball
