= 1917 Far Eastern Championship Games =

International multi-sport event

3rd Far Eastern Championship Games 第3回極東選手権競技大会
- Host city: Tokyo, Japan
- Nations: 3
- Opening: 8 May 1917
- Closing: 12 May 1917
- Opened by: Yoshihito; Emperor of Japan

The 1917 Far Eastern Championship Games was the third edition of the regional multi-sport event, contested between China, Japan and the Philippines, and was held from 8–12 May 1917 in Tokyo, Empire of Japan. A total of eight sports were contested, following the dropping of cycling from the programme after the 1915 games.

In the football competition, China was represented by South China AA, a Hong Kong–based team, while Japan was represented by a team from the Tokyo Higher Normal School.

Japan was the overall champion of the Games following the Philippines, and China.

== Participating nations ==
- Republic of China
- Japanese Empire
- Philippine Islands

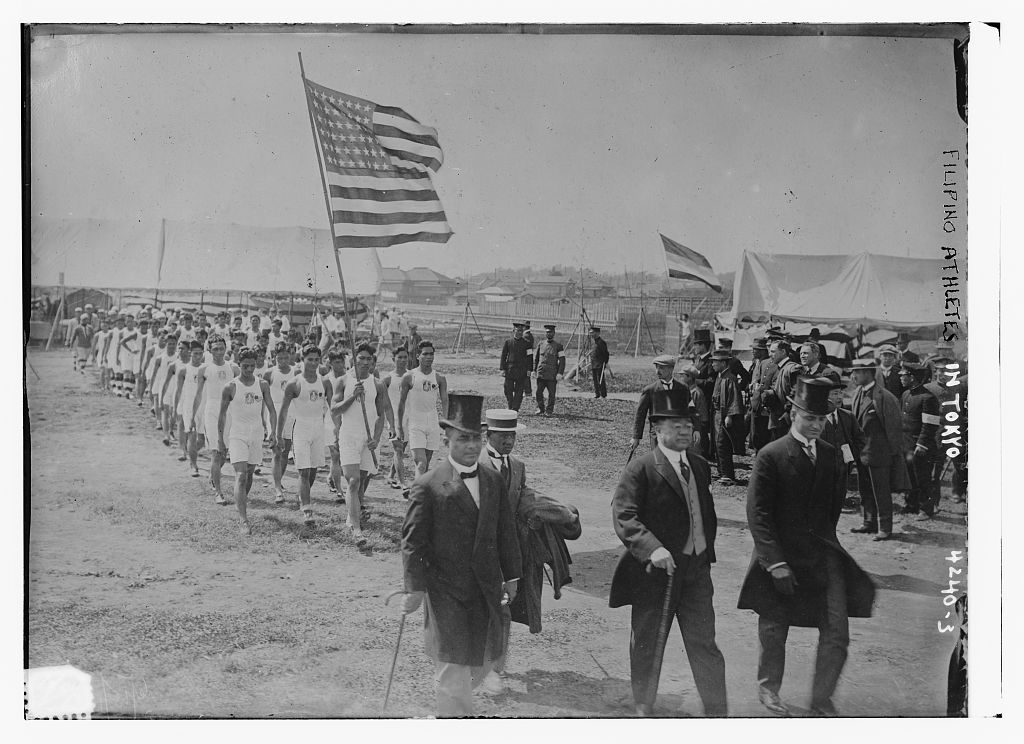
Filipino Athletes in Tokyo

== Sports ==
- Athletics
- Baseball
- Basketball
- Diving
- Football
- Swimming
- Tennis
- Volleyball
