= 1921 Far Eastern Championship Games =

5th Far Eastern Championship Games
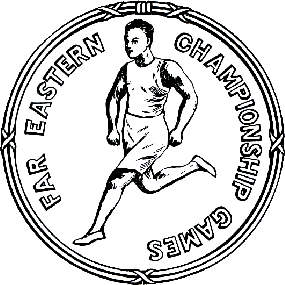
- Logo for the Far Eastern Championship Games
- Host city: Shanghai, China
- Nations: 3
- Opening: 30 May 1921
- Closing: 3 June 1921

The 1921 Far Eastern Championship Games was the fifth edition of the regional multi-sport event, contested between China, Japan and the Philippines, and was held from 30 May to 3 June in Shanghai, Republic of China. A total of eight sports were contested over the course of the five-day event. India, Malaya, Siam (Thailand), Ceylon (Sri Lanka) and Java were all invited to participate at the games, but did not do so due to the expense of sending teams to Shanghai.

In the football competition, China was represented by South China AA, a Hong Kong–based team.

Women were included in the games for the first time. Although no women competed in sports events, around 830 Shanghai schoolgirls did a mass calisthenics demonstration, which included the miming of actions from the sports involved on the main, men-only programme.

The opening ceremony saw cheering of all participants by both Japanese visitors and the Chinese home crowd. The Japanese delegation contained athletes from Taiwan (the former Chinese island then under Japanese rule), but there is no record of any Chinese reaction to this. The closing ceremony was marred by six anarchist protesters from Hunan disrupting the proceedings. The group distributed anti-capitalist material advocating the overthrow of the government and one fired a gun. The group were arrested at the scene.

== Participants ==
- Republic of China
- Japanese Empire
- Philippine Islands

== Sports ==
- Athletics
- Baseball
- Basketball
- Diving
- Football
- Swimming
- Tennis
- Volleyball
