= 1923 Far Eastern Championship Games =

International multi-sport event

6th Far Eastern Championship Games 第6回極東選手権競技大会
- Host city: Osaka, Japan
- Nations: 3
- Opening: 21 May 1923
- Closing: 25 May 1923
- Opened by: Yoshihito; Emperor of Japan
- Main venue: Osaka Municipal Athletic Field

The 1923 Far Eastern Championship Games was the sixth edition of the regional multi-sport event, contested between China, Japan and the Philippines, and was held from 21–25 May in Osaka, Empire of Japan. It was the first and only time that Osaka hosted the event, marking a departure of the capital Tokyo being the traditional Japanese venue. Java, Thailand and French Indochina were invited to compete, but declined. A total of eight sports were contested over the course of the five-day event.

During the games, Lou Salvador of the Philippines' achieved the all-time record for the most points scored by a player in a single game in international basketball competition. He scored 116 points to lead the Philippines and beat China to recapture the gold medal.

In the football competition, China was represented by South China AA, a Hong Kong-based team.

Women appeared as competitors at the games for the first time. Demonstration matches in tennis and volleyball were contested but were not awarded medals as part of the official programme.

There were calls for a boycott of the 1923 games in China, due to poor relations with Japan, but as the delegation was traditionally led by an American from the Chinese YMCA branch the nation participated at the games regardless. This led to further questions in the press about China's national sovereignty in international sports.

== Participants ==
- Republic of China
- Japanese Empire
- Philippine Islands

== Sports ==
- Athletics
- Baseball
- Basketball
- Diving
- Football
- Swimming
- Tennis
- Volleyball
