= 1925 Far Eastern Championship Games =

7th Far Eastern Championship Games
- Host city: Manila, Philippines
- Nations: 3
- Opening: 17 May 1925
- Closing: 22 May 1925

The 1925 Far Eastern Championship Games was the seventh edition of the regional multi-sport event, contested between China, Japan and the Philippines, and was held from 17 to 22 May in Manila, the Philippines. A total of eight sports were contested over the course of the five-day event.

The Philippines are the general champions.

China won the football tournament for a sixth consecutive time.

== Participants ==
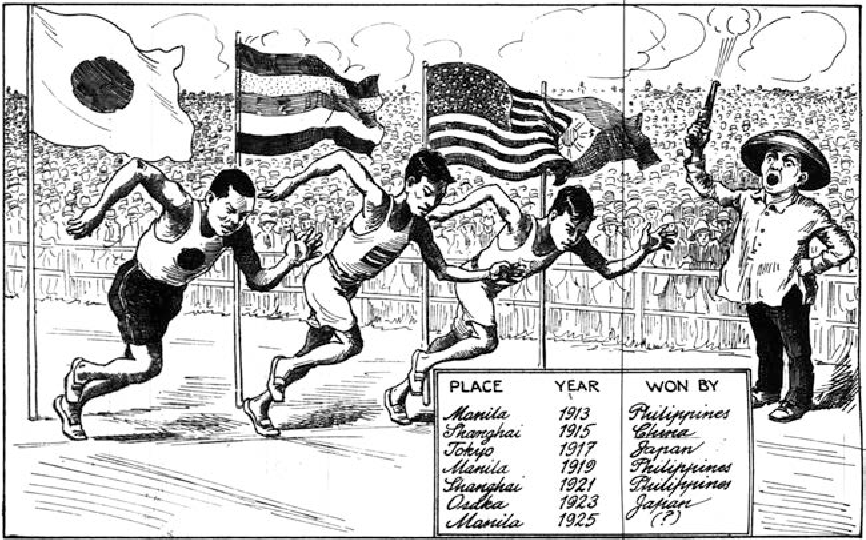
Cartoon from The Philippines Free Press concerning the opening of the 1925 games.

- Republic of China
- Japanese Empire
- Philippine Islands

== Sports ==
- Athletics
- Baseball
- Basketball
- Diving
- Football
- Swimming
- Tennis
- Volleyball
