= Far Eastern Championship Games =

Asian multi-sport event between 1913–1934

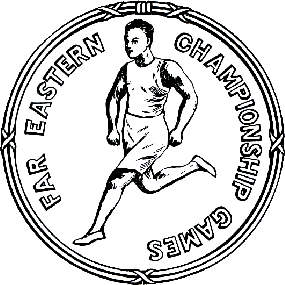
- Frequency: Every 2 years
- Inaugurated: 1913 in Manila, Philippine Islands
- Most recent: 1934 in Manila, Philippine Islands

The Far Eastern Championship Games (also known as the Far Eastern Championships, Far Eastern Games or Far East Games) was an Asian multi-sport event considered to be a precursor to the Asian Games.

== History ==
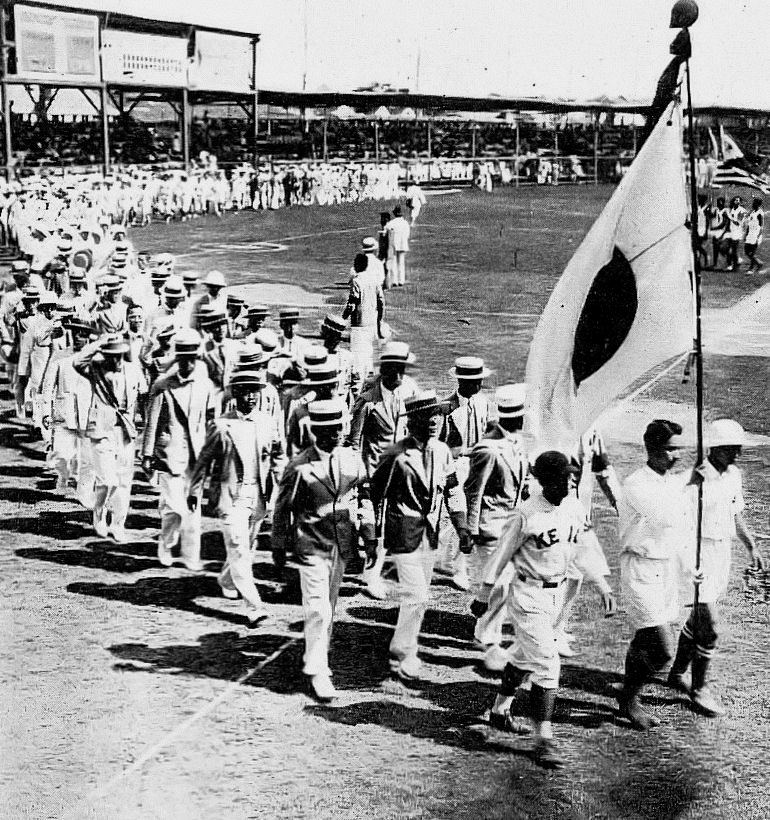
The Japanese delegation at the 1927 Far Eastern Games

In 1913, Elwood Brown, president of the Philippine Amateur Athletic Association and Manila Carnival Games, proposed the creation of the "Far Eastern Olympic Games" to China and Japan. It was when Governor-General William Cameron Forbes was the president of the Philippine Amateur Athletic Federation (1911–1913). Governor-General Forbes formed the Far Eastern Olympic Association.

Brown collaborated with J. Howard Crocker and YMCA from missionaries in China, Japan and the Philippines, to establish the Far Eastern Championship Games.

The first event was held on the Manila Carnival grounds (later the Rizal Memorial Sports Complex) in Malate, Manila, Philippines on February 4, 1913 and was known as the "First Oriental Olympic Games". Forbes was also the one who formally declare the games open. Six countries participated in the eight-day event: the host country then-named Philippine Islands, Republic of China, Empire of Japan, British East Indies (Malaysia), Kingdom of Thailand and British crown colony Hong Kong. Critics of the YMCA's involvement with the creation of the Far Eastern Olympic Games point to it being an example of Western cultural imperialism as the YMCA's goals were to push western ideas of physical strength and culture onto these Asian countries.

In 1915, the name changed to Far Eastern Championship Games and the association to Far Eastern Athletic Association when the event was held at Hongkou Park in Shanghai, China. Many citizens in China were curious about the Far Eastern Championship Games and there was a great amount of interest in the novelty of the organized sporting event. This resulted in large crowds of people attending matches making them quite popular which justified the construction of the new sporting infrastructure in China. The games were deemed very popular and were observed by thousands of spectators in China as well as followed by many in the newspapers. They were held there again in 1921. The games were held every two years except in 1929 when Japan decided to delay the project to 1930. The FEAA decided to change the time table to four years and the Philippine Islands hosted the tenth games in 1934. Dutch East Indies (Indonesia) joined in the 1934 FECG.

The 1934 edition was held in a period of dispute between China and Japan, following the Japanese invasion of Manchuria in 1931. Inclusion of people from this region in the games caused controversy between the two member nations, which resulted in the break-up of the Far Eastern Athletic Association. In September 1937, Japan invaded China with the Marco Polo Bridge Incident and started the Second Sino-Japanese War (which later became part of World War II), thus the planned games in 1938 were cancelled.

== Editions ==
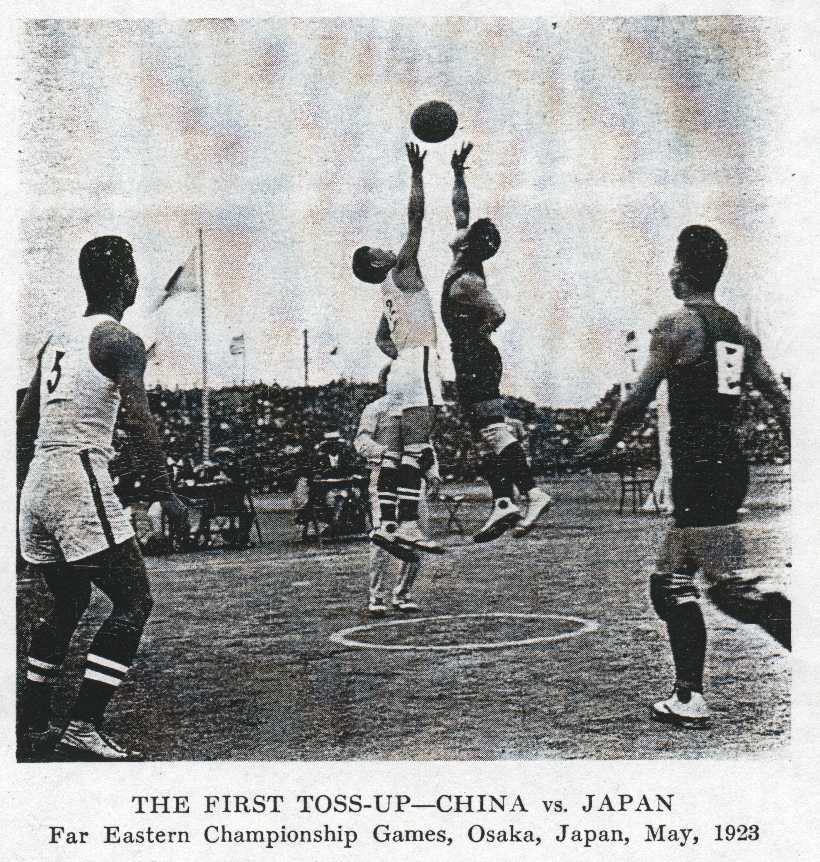
1923 Far Eastern Championship Games.

Year	Games	Dates	Host city	Host nation
1913	1	3–7 February	Manila	Philippines
1915	2	15–21 May	Shanghai	China
1917	3	8–12 May	Tokyo	Japan
1919	4	12–16 May	Manila	Philippines
1921	5	30 May–3 June	Shanghai	China
1923	6	21–25 May	Osaka	Japan
1925	7	17–22 May	Manila	Philippines
1927	8	28–31 August	Shanghai	China
1930	9	24–27 May	Tokyo	Japan
1934	10	16–20 May	Manila	Philippines
1938	11	Cancelled	Osaka	Japan

== Sports ==
A total of nine different sports were contested over the lifetime of the competition. Eight of the sports featured on each programmes of the games, with the ninth sport – cycling – being held once only, in 1915.

- Athletics
- Baseball
- Basketball
- Cycling
- Diving
- Football
- Swimming
- Tennis
- Volleyball

== Participating nations ==
- Republic of China (all editions)
- Dutch East Indies (1934 only)
- Federated Malay States (1913 only)
- British Hong Kong (1913 only)
- British Raj (1930 only)
- Empire of Japan (all editions)
- Philippines (all editions)
- Kingdom of Siam (1913 only)

== See also ==
- Asian Games
- East Asian Games
- Southeast Asian Games
- West Asian Games
