= Japan at the 1928 Summer Olympics =

- IOC code: JPN
- NOC: Japanese Olympic Committee

in Amsterdam
- Competitors: 43
- Flag bearer: Yonetaro Nakazawa
- Medals Ranked 15th: Gold 2 Silver 2 Bronze 1 Total 5

Summer Olympics appearances (overview)
- 1912; 1920; 1924; 1928; 1932; 1936; 1948; 1952; 1956; 1960; 1964; 1968; 1972; 1976; 1980; 1984; 1988; 1992; 1996; 2000; 2004; 2008; 2012; 2016; 2020; 2024

The Empire of Japan competed at the 1928 Summer Olympics in Amsterdam, Netherlands.

== Background ==
The Japan Amateur Athletic Federation (Nihon Rikujo Kyogi Renmei), founded in 1925, officially took over sponsorship of the Japanese Olympic team from the Japan Amateur Athletic Association in 1928. Japanese government sponsorship of the Olympic effort continued, both financially, and through expansion of the annual Meiji Shrine Games to include a wider variety of sports, including archery, basketball, field hockey, rowing, table tennis, volleyball and equestrian sports.

The games became the qualifying event for the Japanese Olympic team, which now for the first time included a woman (Kinue Hitomi). For the 1928 Olympics, Japan fielded 43 athletes.

== Medalists ==
Medal	Name	Sport	Event	Date
Gold	Mikio Oda	Athletics	Men's triple jump	August 2
Gold	Yoshiyuki Tsuruta	Swimming	Men's 200 m breaststroke	August 8
Silver	Kinue Hitomi	Athletics	Women's 800 m	August 2
Silver	Hiroshi Yoneyama; Nobuo Arai; Tokuhei Sada; Katsuo Takaishi	Swimming	Men's 4 × 200 m freestyle relay	August 11
Bronze	Katsuo Takaishi	Swimming	Men's 100 m freestyle	August 11

Medals by sport
Sport	1st place, gold medalist(s)	2nd place, silver medalist(s)	3rd place, bronze medalist(s)	Total
Swimming	1	1	1	3
Athletics	1	1	0	2
Total	2	2	1	5

== Athletics ==
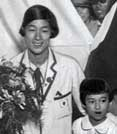
Kinue Hitomi:Silver medalist of Woman's 800m Athletics at the 1928 Amsterdam Olympic Games

Ranks given are within the heat.

Athlete	Event	Heat		Quarterfinal		Semifinal		Final	
Athlete	Event	Result	Rank	Result	Rank	Result	Rank	Result	Rank
Iwao Aizawa	Men's 100 m	?	4	Did not advance					
Iwao Aizawa	Men's 200 m	22.6	3	Did not advance					
Yoshio Miki	Men's 110 m hurdles	15.4	1 Q	?	6	Did not advance			
Juichi Nagatani	Men's 10000 m	?	19	Did not advance					
Juichi Nagatani	Men's Marathon	—N/a						3:03.34	48
Seiichiro Tsuda	Men's Marathon	—N/a						2:36.20	6
Kanematsu Yamada	Men's Marathon	—N/a						2:35.29	4

Field events

Athlete	Event	Qualification		Final	
Athlete	Event	Distance	Position	Distance	Position
Ichiro Furuyama	Discus throw	37.89	27	Did not advance	
Kazuo Kimura	High jump	1.83	1 Q	1.88	6
Yonetaro Nakazawa	Pole vault	3.66	1 Q	3.90	6
Chūhei Nambu	Long jump	7.25	9	Did not advance	
Chūhei Nambu	Triple jump	15.01	2 Q	15.01	4
Mikio Oda	Long jump	7.11	11	Did not advance	
Mikio Oda	Triple jump	15.21	1 Q	15.21	Gold medal
Mikio Oda	High jump	1.83	1 Q	1.88	7
Yoshio Okita	Discus throw	36.38	30	Did not advance	
Yoshio Okita	Hammer throw	44.41	15	Did not advance	
Kosaku Sumiyoshi	Javelin throw	59.05	13	Did not advance	

Combined events – Decathlon

Athlete	Event	100 m	LJ	SP	HJ	400 m	100H	DT	PV	JT	1500 m	Final	Rank
Yonetaro Nakazawa	Result	12.4	6.04	10.37	1.75	1:01.8	18.4	31.43	3.70	40.33	5:54.6	4795	22
Yonetaro Nakazawa	Points	531	595	508	585	350	464	493	535	447	287	4795	22
Tatsuo Toki	Result	11.6	6.90	11.03	1.75	54.4	16.8	34.01	3.10	45.83	5:10.8	5794	12
Tatsuo Toki	Points	683	790	548	585	617	620	544	381	527	499	5794	12

Women
Track & road events

Athlete	Event	Heat		Quarterfinal		Semifinal		Final	
Athlete	Event	Result	Rank	Result	Rank	Result	Rank	Result	Rank
Kinue Hitomi	800 m	2:26:04	Q	—N/a				2:17:06	Silver medal

== Boxing ==
Athlete	Event	Round of 32	Round of 16	Quarterfinal	Semifinal	Final	
Athlete	Event	Opposition Result	Opposition Result	Opposition Result	Opposition Result	Opposition Result	Rank
Fuji Okamoto	Bantamweight	BYE	Traynor (IRL); L	Did not advance			
Kintaro Usuda	Welterweight	Fernández (ESP); W	Hall (RHO); W	Smillie (CAN); L	Did not advance		

== Diving ==
Swimmer	Event	Heats		Semifinals		Final	
Swimmer	Event	Result	Rank	Result	Rank	Result	Rank
Fumio Takashina	Men's 3 m springboard	139.82	8 QF	x	x	139.78	9

== Equestrian ==
=== Dressage ===
Equestrian	Horse	Event	Final	
Equestrian	Horse	Event	Score	Rank
Kozeki Okada	Takushu	Dressage	193.70	20
Kohei Yusa	Sakigake	Dressage	166.96	28

=== Eventing ===
Athlete	Horse	Event	Dressage		Cross-country			Jumping			Total	
Athlete	Horse	Event	Dressage		Cross-country			Final			Total	
Athlete	Horse	Event	Penalties	Rank	Penalties	Total	Rank	Penalties	Total	Rank	Penalties	Rank
Shunzo Kido	Kyngun	Individual	200.66	17	1432.0	6	1632.66	8	180.0	26	1812.66	21

=== Show jumping ===
Athlete	Horse	Event	Qualification			Final			
Athlete	Horse	Event	Time	Penalties	Rank	Penalties	Rank	Penalties	Rank
Shigetomo Yoshida	Kyuzan	Individual	DSQ			Did not advance			

== Rowing ==
Men

Athlete	Event	Round 1		Repechage		Round 2		Repechage		Round 3		Semifinal		Final	
Athlete	Event	Time	Rank	Time	Rank	Time	Rank	Time	Rank	Time	Rank	Time	Rank	Time	Rank
Kinichiro Ishii	Single Sculls	DNF	15	Did not advance											
Kazuo Nose; Makoto Tsushida; Isamu Takashima; Hachiro Sato; Tsukasa Sonobe	Coxed four	7:49.0	2 R	7:51.4	2	Did not advance									

== Swimming ==
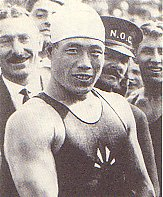
Tsuruta:Gold medalist of Man's 200m Breaststroke at the 1928 Amsterdam Olympic Games

Athlete	Event	Heat		Semifinal		Final	
Athlete	Event	Time	Rank	Time	Rank	Time	Rank
Nobuo Arai	Men's 400 m freestyle	5:23.4	10 QQ	DNS		Did not advance	
Nobuo Arai	Men's 1500 m freestyle	21:35:4	9 QQ	DNS		Did not advance	
Toshio Irie	Men's 100 m backstroke	1:13.4	3 QQ	1:14.0	3 QF	1:13.6	4
Shourai Kimura	Men's 100 m backstroke	DNS		Did not advance			
Yuki Mawatari	Men's 200 m breaststroke	DNS		Did not advance			
Katsuo Takaishi	Men's 100 m freestyle	1:01.2	4 QQ	1:00.0	1 QF	1:00.0	3rd place, bronze medalist(s)
Katsuo Takaishi	Men's 400 m freestyle	5:22.8	9 QF	DNS		Did not advance	
Takaji Takebayashi	Men's 1500 m freestyle	22:30.4	9 QQ	DNF	—	Did not advance	
Yoshiyuki Tsuruta	Men's 200 m breaststroke	2:50.0	1 OR	2:49.2	1 OR	2:48.8	(gold) OR
Hiroshi Yoneyama	400 metre freestyle	5:17.8	3 QQ	DNS		Did not advance	
Nobuo Arai; Tokuhei Sada; Katsuo Takaishi; Hiroshi Yoneyama	4×200 metre freestyle relay	9:42.6	2 QF	—N/a		9:41.4	2nd place, silver medalist(s)

== Wrestling ==
Men's Freestyle

Athlete	Event	Elimination Pool							Final round	
Athlete	Event	Round 1 Result	Round 2 Result	Round 3 Result	Round 4 Result	Round 5 Result	Round 6 Result	Rank	Final round Result	Rank
Isuke Shinmen	−65 kg	BYE	Hans Mollet (SUI); L F	—N/a				8	Did not advance	
