= Philippines at the 1928 Summer Olympics =

Sporting event delegation

- Flag of the Philippines
- IOC code: PHI
- NOC: Philippine Amateur Athletic Federation

in Amsterdam, Netherlands May 17, 1928 – August 12, 1928
- Competitors: 4 in 2 sports
- Flag bearer: Anselmo Gonzaga
- Medals Ranked 32nd: Gold 0 Silver 0 Bronze 1 Total 1

Summer Olympics appearances (overview)
- 1924; 1928; 1932; 1936; 1948; 1952; 1956; 1960; 1964; 1968; 1972; 1976; 1980; 1984; 1988; 1992; 1996; 2000; 2004; 2008; 2012; 2016; 2020; 2024

The Philippines, also known as the Philippine Islands, (Note: In the official report made by the Netherlands Olympic Committee, the nation is interchangeably referred as "Philippine Islands" and "Philippines".) competed at the 1928 Summer Olympics in Amsterdam, Netherlands, which were held from May 17 to August 12. The country's participation in Amsterdam marked their second appearance at the Summer Olympics since their debut at the previous games in 1924. The delegation consisted of four competitors: sprinter Anselmo Gonzaga, high-jumper Simeon Toribio, and swimmers Tuburan Tamse and Teófilo Yldefonso, and four officials: attaché C. Boissevain, sports official J. Fruitt Maxwell, representative Costancio Alvarado, and medical officer Regino Ylanan.

Plans to create a team for the 1928 Summer Games were organized by the Philippine Amateur Athletic Federation. Selection through tryouts were held in February 1928 and planned selected athletes competing in athletics and swimming, though were open to selecting athletes in other sports. The men's national tennis team were also expected to compete at the Summer Games though tennis was removed from the program due to a conflict between the International Olympic Committee and International Lawn Tennis Federation.

Yldefonso, who competed in the men's 200 meter breaststroke, won the bronze medal in the event. His win earned the nation's first medal at any of the Olympic Games.

== Medalists ==
Medal	Name	Sport	Event	Date
Bronze	Teófilo Yldefonso	Swimming	Men's 200 m breaststroke	August 8

== Background ==
The 1928 Summer Olympics were held from May 17 to August 12, in Amsterdam, Netherlands. This edition of the games marked the nation's second appearance at the Summer Olympics since their debut at the last games, the 1924 Summer Olympics, which were held in Paris, France.

=== Qualification and delegation ===
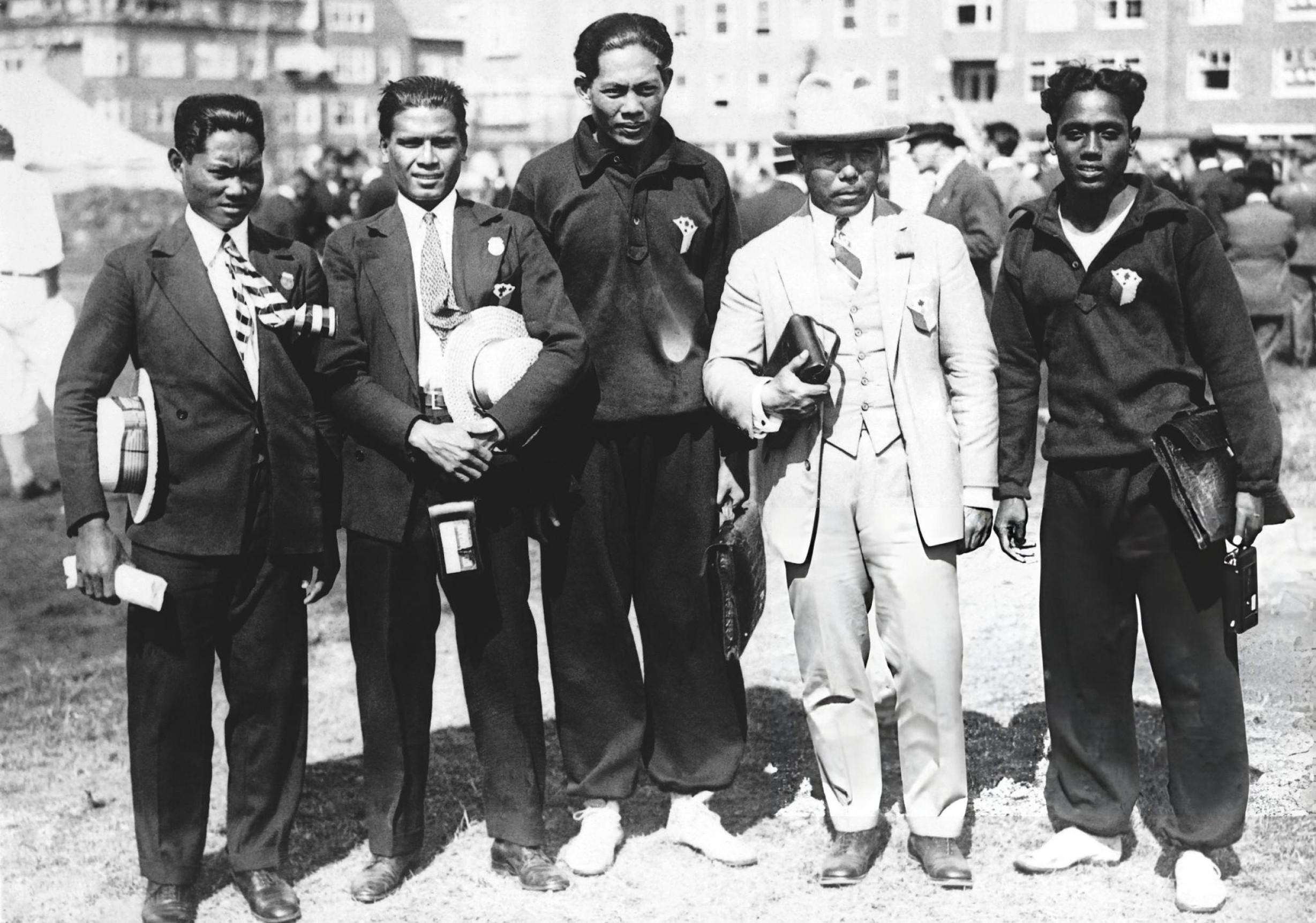
The four athletes that competed at the games: Tamse, Yldefonso, Toribio, and Gonzaga, respectively, with Ylanan (second from right)

The delegation was organized by the Philippine Amateur Athletic Federation, although the federation's recognition as the National Olympic Committee of the nation was in 1929. To be determined through tryouts in February 1928, the federation originally planned for five competitors to compete at the games. Selecting three competitors in athletics, a sprinter, a middle-distance runner, and a high jumper, and two competitors in swimming, however the federation was willing to include other competitors in the delegation if the competitors "develop unexpected ability" during the tryouts in other sports included in the program. It was also set that the men's national tennis team that competed at the 1928 International Lawn Tennis Challenge Europe Zone (commonly known as the Davis Cup), composed of Guillermo Aragon and Lope Yngayo, were to compete at the games as well. Tennis was removed from the program after the previous games.

The final delegation included eight people. (Note: Based on compiled citations) The non-competitors were C. Boissevain, who served as the attaché, J. Fruitt Maxwell as an official in the athletics and swimming events, Costancio Alvarado as a representative, and Regino Ylanan as the medical officer of the team. The athletes that were included were: sprinter Anselmo Gonzaga, high-jumper Simeon Toribio, and swimmers Tuburan Tamse and Teófilo Yldefonso. Tamse was the first Filipino Muslim to compete at a games.

=== Opening ceremony ===
Each nation that entered at the Parade of Nations during the opening ceremony of the games were arranged according to their Dutch names, besides the delegations of Greece that came first and the Netherlands that came last. The Philippine delegation marched 32nd out of the 46 nations in the Parade of Nations within the opening ceremony. Anselmo Gonzaga held the flag for the delegation.

== Athletics ==
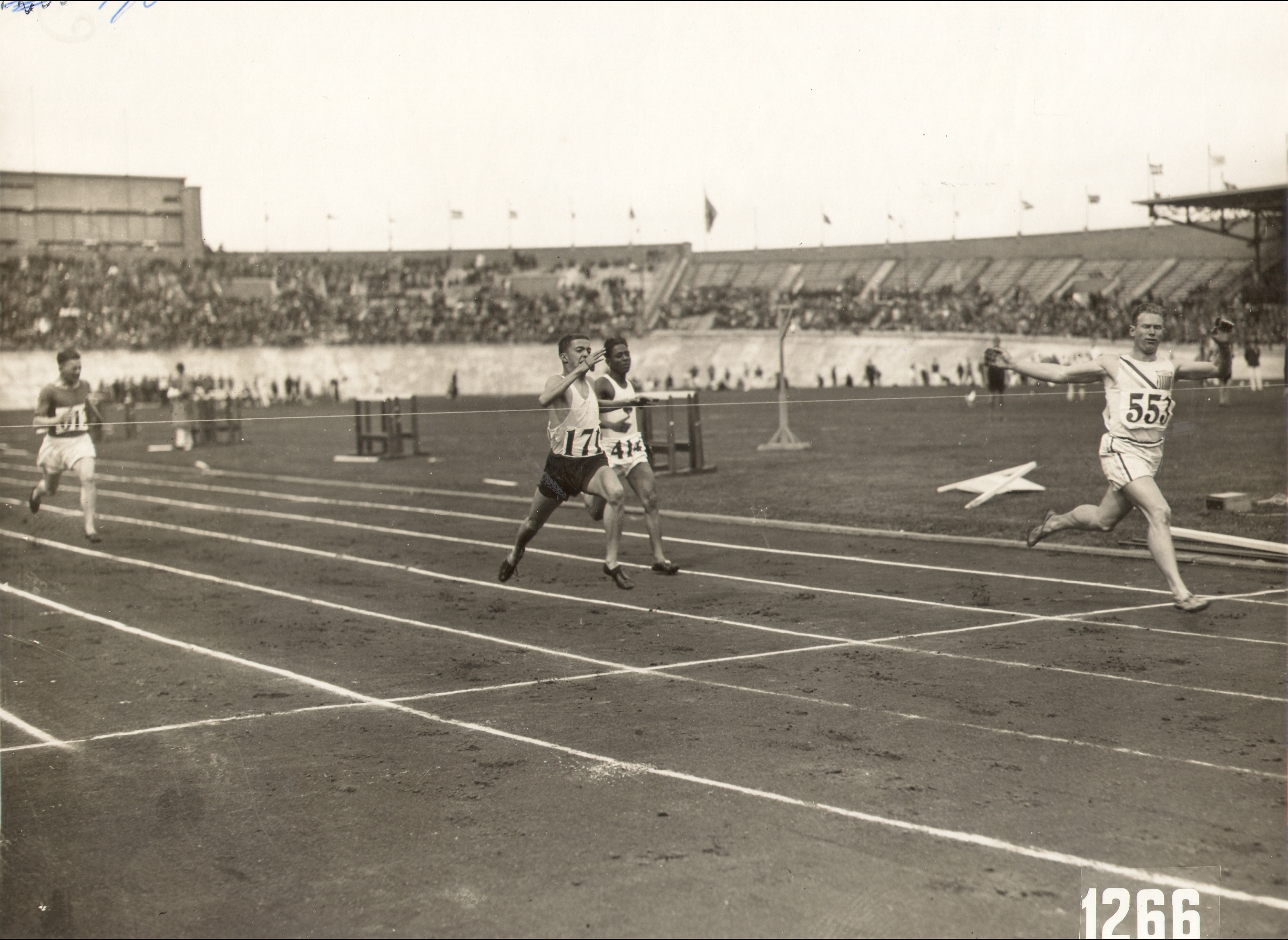
Gonzaga (second from right) in his 200 meter heat

The athletics events were held in the Olympic Stadium. Toribio first competed in the men's high jump on July 29, where he competed in the Group A of the qualifying stages and qualified for the finals with a jump of 1.83 meters, equaling first place. In the finals, he jumped a height of 1.91 meters and placed fourth after a jump-off. Although Toribio missed out on a medal due to his bad form, General Douglas MacArthur commented that Toribio had potential and that he would supply Toribio with a coach once he arrived in the Philippines.

The same day, Gonzaga competed in the sixteenth heat of the first round of the men's 100 meters, where he ran with an unknown time and placed second to qualify for the next round. He then competed in the fifth heat in the quarterfinals and failed to progress further with a disputed placement of fourth and an estimated time of 11.2 seconds. Two days later, he competed in the fifth heat of the first round of the men's 200 meters. He placed third with a time of 22.7 seconds, and failed to progress further.

Men
Track & road events

Athlete	Event	Heat		Quarterfinal		Semifinal		Final	
Athlete	Event	Result	Rank	Result	Rank	Result	Rank	Result	Rank
Anselmo Gonzaga	100 m	Unknown	2 Q	11.2est	4	Did not advance			
Anselmo Gonzaga	200 m	22.7	3	Did not advance					

Field events

Athlete	Event	Qualification		Final	
Athlete	Event	Distance	Position	Distance	Position
Simeon Toribio	High jump	1.83	=1 Q	1.91	4

== Swimming ==
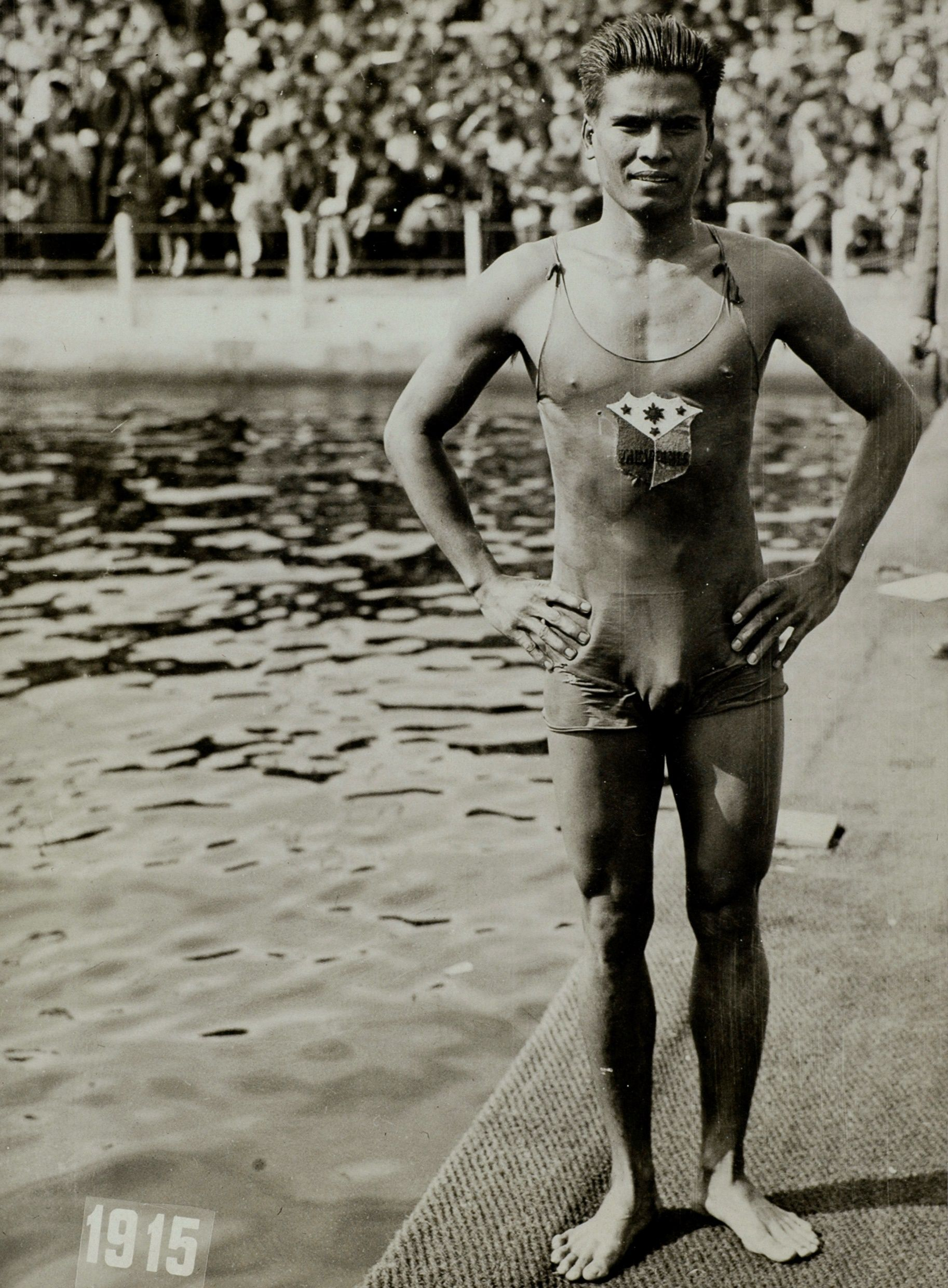
Yldefonso after the finals of the men's 200 meter backstroke

The swimming events were held in the Olympic Sports Park Swim Stadium. Tamse competed first in the men's 1500 meter freestyle in the fifth heat of the first round on August 4. He placed last out of five swimmers, swam in an unknown time and failed to progress further. Tamse then competed in the men's 400 meter freestyle in the third heat of the first round on August 7. He placed fourth out of the four athletes that competed with a time of 20:17, and failed to progress further.

Yldefonso then competed in the second heat of the first round on August 6. He placed third out of six swimmers, swam in a time of 2:57.4 and qualified further based on his time. The following day, he swam in the first heat of the semifinals, finished with a time of 2:53.2, and qualified for the finals. In the finals, he finished with a time of 2:56.4. He placed third and earned the bronze medal, which won the nation its first ever Olympic medal of any color.

Tamse and Yldefonso were also set to compete in the men's 100 meter freestyle and men's 100 meter backstroke respectively, but both did not start in the events.

Men

Athlete	Event	Heat		Semifinal		Final	
Athlete	Event	Time	Rank	Time	Rank	Time	Rank
Tuburan Tamse	100 m freestyle	DNS		Did not advance			
Tuburan Tamse	400 m freestyle	5:39.8	4	Did not advance			
Tuburan Tamse	1500 m freestyle	20:17	4	Did not advance			
Teófilo Yldefonso	100 m backstroke	DNS		Did not advance			
Teófilo Yldefonso	200 m breaststroke	2:57.4	3 q	2:53.2	3 Q	2:56.4	3rd place, bronze medalist(s)
