= Athletics at the 1927 Far Eastern Championship Games =

VIII Far Eastern Championship Games
- Dates: August
- Host city: Shanghai, China
- Events: 19
- Participation: 3 nations

At the 1927 Far Eastern Championship Games, the athletics events were held in Shanghai, China in August. A total of 19 men's athletics events were contested at the competition.

Japan topped the medal table in athletics, winning eleven of the events on offer. Japanese men completed podium sweeps in the three distance track running events, and also in the triple jump. The Philippines—the previous edition's winner—was the next most successful through its eight gold medals. Marking a continued decline for Chinese athletes, the country won only two bronze medals – both for finishing last in relay competitions. This was the first occasion that China failed to have an individual medallist and also the first time no Chinese topped the athletics podium across all disciplines.

Three athletes successfully defended their titles from the 1925 edition: Yukiyoshi Kuwata in the 800 metres, Generoso Rabaya in the 110 metres hurdles, and Mikio Oda in the triple jump. This was Oda's third straight triple jump title and in addition he was the most successful athlete of the games, taking gold medals in the long jump and decathlon also. This performance preceded his becoming the first ever Asian Olympic champion at the 1928 Summer Olympics. The triple jump competition was a scene of Japanese dominance as the other podium finishers, Kenkichi Oshima and Chuhei Nambu, went on to win Olympic medals at the 1932 Summer Olympics.

Other prominent competitors were David Nepomuceno – the 100 metres winner who had become the first Filipino Olympian three years earlier. Simeon Toribio, another Filipino, took the high jump title and went on to become the country's first Olympic athletics medallist at the 1932 Olympics. Takayoshi Yoshioka, a future men's 100 metres world record holder, medalled in both short sprints. His countryman Yonetaro Nakazawa was the pole vault winner and went on to be the Japanese flag bearer at the Olympics the following year.

== Medal summary ==
Event	Gold		Silver		Bronze	
100 metres	David Nepomuceno (PHI)	11.0	Seisei Takagi (JPN)	???	Takayoshi Yoshioka (JPN)	???
200 metres straight	Anselmo Gonzaga (PHI)	22.3	Takayoshi Yoshioka (JPN)	???	David Nepomuceno (PHI)	???
400 metres	Serafin Estrada (PHI)	50.6	Kisaku Okamoto (JPN)	???	Simplicio Royong (PHI)	???
800 metres	Yukiyoshi Kuwata (JPN)	2:01.3	Haruo Yashiba (JPN)	???	Nobuyoshi Hashimoto (JPN)	???
1500 metres	Seiichiro Tsuda (JPN)	4:14.1	Kineo Tsuchiya (JPN)	???	Masatoshi Kitazumi (JPN)	???
10,000 metres	Mosaku Michikawa (JPN)	34:56.5	Chiyoji Takemoto (JPN)	???	Koshio Tsuchiya (JPN)	???
110 m hurdles	Generoso Rabaya (PHI)	16.0	Yoshio Miki (JPN)	???	Yukio Fukui (JPN)	???
200 m hurdles straight	Yukio Fukui (JPN)	25.1	Paulino Fernandez (PHI)	???	Yoshio Miki (JPN)	???
4×200 m relay	Philippines (PHI)	1:31.2	Japan (JPN)	???	China (CHN)	???
4×400 m relay	Philippines (PHI)	3:28.9	Japan (JPN)	???	China (CHN)	???
High jump	Simeon Toribio (PHI)	1.93 m	Katsunosuke Hattori (JPN) Susumu Hiraoka (JPN) Kazuo Kimura (JPN)	1.83 m	Not awarded	
Pole vault	Yonetaro Nakazawa (JPN)	3.675 m	Miguel Sujeco (PHI)	3.60 m	Hiroshi Kasahara (JPN)	3.60 m
Long jump	Mikio Oda (JPN)	7.07 m	Simeon Carino (PHI)	6.94 m	Koppei Murakami (JPN)	6.795 m
Triple jump	Mikio Oda (JPN)	15.355 m	Kenkichi Oshima (JPN)	14.39 m	Chuhei Nambu (JPN)	14.375 m
Shot put	Arturo Roa (PHI)	14.225 m	Tatsuo Arima (JPN)	13.925 m	Sebastian Santos (PHI)	13.865 m
Discus throw	Yoshio Okita (JPN)	38.70 m	Yasuyuki Fujita (JPN)	36.88 m	Generoso Rabaya (PHI)	36.37 m
Javelin throw	Kosaku Sumiyoshi (JPN)	56.90 m	S. Almero (PHI)	53.93 m	Arturo Roa (PHI)	51.91 m
Pentathlon	Yasushi Hoshina (JPN)	2542 pts	Jitsuichi Fujiguchi (JPN)	2489 pts	Silvestre Driz (PHI)	2441 pts
Decathlon	Mikio Oda (JPN)	5504 pts	Goichi Koyama (JPN)	5132 pts	Regino Portacion (PHI)	4913 pts
