= Athletics at the 1934 Far Eastern Championship Games =

X Far Eastern Championship Games
- Dates: May
- Host city: Manila, Philippines
- Events: 19
- Participation: 3 nations

At the 1934 Far Eastern Championship Games, the athletics events were held in Manila, the Philippines in May. A total of 19 men's athletics events were contested at the competition. The 400 metres hurdles and 4×100 metres relay were contested for the first and only time, replacing the 200 m variants and conforming to the standard Olympic standard. This was the last edition of the games.

Japan won a third successive athletics title, taking twelve of the nineteen gold medals on offer and completing medal sweeps in four events. The Philippines, the host nation, again took second place as it claimed the other seven titles and had a clean sweep in the 400 metres. Marcelino Andes became the first non-Japanese medallist in the 1500 metres. China won four medals in the competition – far behind the opposition, but a great improvement on the single relay medal from the previous games.

Only two athletes defended their titles from the 1930 Games. Takayoshi Yoshioka won the 200 metres, but was prevented from repeating his sprint double in the 100 metres by Rafael de Leon. Simeon Toribio was the other repeat victor and his third straight win made him the most successful high jumper in the competition's history.

Kenkichi Oshima's triple jump win completed Japan's unbeaten streak in the event. The minor medallists in that event, Naoto Tajima and Masao Harada, were the top two in the long jump here and took gold and silver in the triple jump at the 1936 Summer Olympics two years later. Two other Far Eastern champions took later medals at that Olympics: Miguel White in the 400 m hurdles and Sueo Ōe in the pole vault.

== Medal summary ==
Event	Gold		Silver		Bronze	
100 metres	Rafael de Leon (PHI)	10.6	Takayoshi Yoshioka (JPN)	10.9	Izuo Anno (JPN)	???
200 metres turn	Takayoshi Yoshioka (JPN)	21.6	Matsuo Taniguchi (JPN)	21.9	Monta Suzuki (JPN)	???
400 metres	German Candara (PHI)	49.8	Nemesio de Guzman (PHI)	???	Serafin Estrada (PHI)	???
800 metres	Kumao Aochi (JPN)	1:57.2	Marcelino Andes (PHI)	1:57.3	Pedro Yatar (PHI)	???
1500 metres	Hideo Tanaka (JPN)	4:03.5	Choshun Ryu (JPN)	4:05.0	Marcelino Andes (PHI)	4:05.5
10,000 metres	Choshun Ryu (JPN)	32:45.5	Hideo Tanaka (JPN)	33:55.7	Tadao Najima (JPN)	???
110 m hurdles	Tadashi Murakami (JPN)	14.8	Felizardo Casia Sr. (PHI)	15.0	Wenceslao Bansale (PHI)	???
400 m hurdles	Miguel White (PHI)	53.0	Constantino Alhambra (PHI)	54.6	Masao Ichihara (JPN)	???
4 × 100 m relay	Japan (JPN)	42.3	Philippines (PHI)	???	China (CHN)	???
4 × 400 m relay	Philippines (PHI)	3:20.3	Japan (JPN)	3:20.5	China (CHN)	???
High jump	Simeon Toribio (PHI)	1.93 m	Yoshiro Asakuma (JPN)	1.93 m	Kiyoshi Adachi (JPN)	1.88 m
Pole vault	Sueo Ōe (JPN)	3.96 m	Fu Baolu (CHN)	3.86 m	Iwao Matsumoto (JPN)	3.86 m
Long jump	Naoto Tajima (JPN)	7.30 m	Masao Harada (JPN)	7.26 m	Niño Ramirez (PHI)	6.96 m
Triple jump	Kenkichi Oshima (JPN)	15.07 m	Masao Harada (JPN)	14.98 m	Naoto Tajima (JPN)	14.95 m
Shot put	Isaoko Abe (JPN)	12.905 m	Chen Baoqiu (CHN)	12.80 m	Mario Branzuela (PHI)	12.65 m
Discus throw	Aurelio Amante (PHI)	42.54 m	Kosaku Kikumoto (JPN)	42.21 m	Kiyoharu Fujita (JPN)	40.35 m
Javelin throw	Saburo Nagao (JPN)	59.81 m	Genzaburo Suzuki (JPN)	59.15 m	Jose Antonio (PHI)	56.25 m
Pentathlon	Hideo Yanada (JPN)	3476.580	Takeshi Yoshizumi (JPN)	3345.425	Saburo Nagao (JPN)	3224.865
Decathlon	Daniel May (PHI)	7094.610 pts	Fusao Kaneki (JPN)	6775.690 pts	Tatsuo Toki (JPN)	6501.070 pts
