= 1928 Summer Olympics national flag bearers =

During the opening ceremony of the 1928 Summer Olympics, athletes from each country participating in the Olympics paraded into the arena. As Olympic tradition dictates, most participating nations paraded in the alphabetical order of the language of the host country (here Dutch), except Greece, who enters first at the founding nation of the Olympics, and the host country (here the Netherlands) who enters last.

During the Parade of Nations, athletes from all participating countries entered the Olympisch Stadion. Each team was led by a flag bearer that was one of their athletes or officials, designated either by their respective National Olympic Committee (NOC) or by the athletes themselves.

== List ==
Below is a list of parading countries and their announced flag bearer, in the same order as the parade. This is sortable by country name, flag bearer's name, or flag bearer's sport. Names are given in the form officially designated by the IOC (International Olympic Committee).

Order	Nation	Dutch	Flag bearer	Sport
1	Greece	Griekenland	Antonios Karyofyllis	Athletics
2	Argentina	Argentinië	Héctor Méndez	Boxing
3	Australia	Australië	Bobby Pearce	Rowing
4	Belgium	België		
5	Bulgaria	Bulgarije		
6	Canada	Canada	Joseph Wright Jr.	Rowing
7	Chile	Chili	Manuel Plaza	Athletics
8	Cuba	Cuba	José Barrientos	Athletics
9	Denmark	Denemarken	Marius Jørgensen	Athletics
10	Germany	Duitsland	Ernst Paulus	Athletics
11	Egypt	Egypte		
12	Great Britain	Engeland	Malcolm Nokes	Athletics
13	Estonia	Estland	Gustav Kalkun	Athletics
14	Philippines	Filipijnen	Anselmo Gonzaga	Athletics
15	Finland	Finland	Akilles Järvinen	Athletics
16	Haiti	Haïti		
17	Hungary	Hongarije	Kálmán Egri	Athletics
18	Ireland	Ierland	Matt Flanagan	Boxing
19	India	India		
20	Italy	Italië	Carlo Galimberti	Weightlifting
21	Japan	Japan	Yonetaro Nakazawa	Athletics
22	Yugoslavia	Joegoslavië	Dimitrije Stefanović	Athletics
23	Latvia	Letland	Alberts Zvejnieks	Wrestling
24	Lithuania	Litouwen	Paulina Radziulytė	Athletics
25	Luxembourg	Luxemburg	George Schmit	Athletics
26	Mexico	Mexico	Jesús Aguirre	Athletics
27	Monaco	Monaco		
28	New Zealand	Nieuw-Zeeland	Arthur Porritt	Athletics
29	Norway	Noorwegen	Ketil Askildt	Athletics
30	Austria	Oostenrijk	Ludwig Wessely	Athletics
31	Panama	Panama	Adán Gordón	Swimming
32	Poland	Polen	Marian Cieniewski	Wrestling
33	Portugal	Portugal		
34	Rhodesia	Rhodesië		
35	Romania	Roemenië		
36	Spain	Spanje	Diego Ordóñez	Athletics
37	Czechoslovakia	Tsjecho-Slowakije	Josef Effenberger	Gymnastics
38	Turkey	Turkije		
39	Uruguay	Uruguay		
40	United States of America	Verenigde Staten van Amerika	Bud Houser	Athletics
41	South Africa	Zuid-Afrika		
42	Sweden	Zweden	Bo Lindman	Modern pentathlon
43	Switzerland	Zwitserland		
44	Holland	Holland	Sam Olij	Boxing

== See also ==
- 1928 Summer Olympics
