= Kosaku Sumiyoshi =

Japanese athlete (1907–1971)

Medal record

Men's athletics

Representing Japan

Far Eastern Championship Games
| Gold medal – first place | 1927 Shanghai | Javelin throw |
| Gold medal – first place | 1930 Tokyo | Javelin throw |
| Gold medal – first place | 1930 Tokyo | Pentathlon |

Kosaku Sumiyoshi (Japanese: 住吉 耕作; 1 October 1907 – 1971) was a Japanese track and field athlete. He represented his country twice at the Summer Olympics (1928 and 1932) and was the first Asian to compete in the Olympic javelin throw. He was a three-time gold medallist at the Far Eastern Championship Games and the only person to win two javelin titles at the competition.

== Career ==
Born in Hiroshima, Japan, he first emerged as a javelin thrower at the 1927 Far Eastern Championship Games held in Shanghai. His winning mark of 56.90 m (186 ft 8 in) was an improvement of over five metres on the previous games record set two years earlier.

He made his Olympic debut for Japan at the 1928 Amsterdam Olympics and placed thirteenth in the qualifying round with a mark of 59.05 m (193 ft 8 3/4 in). This appearance made his Asia's first ever entrant into the Olympic javelin throw. He stayed in Europe for a few weeks that August to compete at the 1928 Summer Student World Championships in Paris and there he defeated all comers with a throw of 62.81 m (206 ft 3/4 in) to win the gold medal in a games record.

Sumiyoshi continued his regional dominance at the 1930 Far Eastern Championship Games in Tokyo. He defended his javelin title with a games record of 62.19 m (204 ft 1/4 in), which was ultimately the best ever throw in the history of the competition. This made him the first and only person to win two javelin Far Eastern titles. He also won a second gold for the host nation, scoring 2838 in the athletics pentathlon to top rankings as part of a Japanese medal sweep of the event. He travelled to Vienna that year to compete against Western competitors and had a lifetime best throw of 66.42 m (217 ft 10 3/4 in) – a feat which ranked him seventh globally that year. A year later, he was again over the sixty-six-metre mark, having a season's best of 66.03 m (216 ft 7 1/2 in) in the Japanese capital and ranking eighth in the world.

He confirmed his form prior to the 1932 Los Angeles Olympics with a mark of 64.12 m (210 ft 4 1/4 in) in Tokyo in May. He was selected for the 1932 Olympic javelin alongside teammate Saburo Nagao and managed to finish in eighth place with 61.14 m (200 ft 7 in). In his last recorded season of athletic competition, he recorded 65.58 m (215 ft 1 3/4 in) in September 1933 in São Paulo, placing twelfth globally.

== International competitions ==
| Year | Competition | Venue | Position | Event | Notes |
|---|---|---|---|---|---|
| 1927 | Far Eastern Championship Games | Shanghai, China | 1st | Javelin throw | 56.90 m GR |
| 1928 | Olympic Games | Amsterdam, Netherlands | 13th (qualifying) | Javelin throw | 59.05 m |
| 1928 | Student World Championships | Paris, France | 1st | Javelin throw | 62.81 m GR |
| 1930 | Far Eastern Championship Games | Tokyo, Japan | 1st | Javelin throw | 62.19 m GR |
| 1930 | Far Eastern Championship Games | Tokyo, Japan | 1st | Pentathlon | 2838 pts |
| 1932 | Olympic Games | Los Angeles, United States | 8th | Javelin throw | 61.14 m |
