= Athletics at the 1930 Far Eastern Championship Games =

IX Far Eastern Championship Games
- Dates: May
- Host city: Tokyo, Japan
- Events: 19
- Participation: 3 nations

At the 1930 Far Eastern Championship Games, the athletics events were held in Tokyo, Japan in May. A total of 19 men's athletics events were contested at the competition.

The host nation, Japan, defended its athletics title from the 1927 edition with a dominating performance at the competition. Winning all but two of the events contested, it also had medal sweeps in nine events and provided two medallists in all but two individual events. The Philippines won the other two gold medals along with six silver medals to take a clear second place. China won only one medal in athletics – a relay medal for finishing last among the three competing teams. Amid heightened tensions with Japan, China's poor results fostered anti-Japanese sentiment among its citizens, many of whom saw the performance at this edition as a national embarrassment, particularly given the comparative size of Japan compared to China.

Four athletes defended their titles from the previous edition: Seiichiro Tsuda in the 1500 metres, Kosaku Sumiyoshi in the javelin throw, Simeon Toribio in the high jump and Mikio Oda in the triple jump. Oda's victory was his fourth straight Far Eastern win in the event—a feat only bettered by Fortunato Catalon, who won the 100-yard dash/100 metres titles from 1917 to 1925. Takayoshi Yoshioka (a future world record holder) was a double sprint champion on this occasion. Sumiyoshi was the only other person to win two individual titles at the competition, adding the pentathlon to his javelin defence. Oda also won silver medals in the pole vault and long jump—the only man to receive three individual medals at that year's athletics meet.

Japan continued its strong tradition in the jumps with Chuhei Nambu taking the long jump title; he would win the 1932 Olympics triple jump. Shuhei Nishida—pole vault and decathlon champion here—was an Olympic silver medallist at the same games. This success also extended globally for Japan, as Oda and Nishida were gold medallists at the 1930 International University Games. Two of the Filipino medallists in Tokyo, high jumper Toribio and Miguel White, later won Olympic medals (as of 2015, they are the only athletics medallists for the Philippines at the Olympics).

== Medal summary ==
Event	Gold		Silver		Bronze	
100 metres	Takayoshi Yoshioka (JPN)	10.8	Anselmo Gonzaga (PHI)	???	Chuhei Nambu (JPN)	???
200 metres straight	Takayoshi Yoshioka (JPN)	21.8	Anselmo Gonzaga (PHI)	???	Kichizo Sasaki (JPN)	???
400 metres	Itaro Nakajima (JPN)	49.2	Teiichi Nishi (JPN)	???	Miguel White (PHI)	???
800 metres	Susumi Hisatomi (JPN)	1:58.8	Haruo Yashiba (JPN)	???	Pedro Yatar (PHI)	???
1500 metres	Seiichiro Tsuda (JPN)	4:06.0	Masamichi Kitamoto (JPN)	???	Katsujiro Nishiura (JPN)	???
10,000 metres	Yutaka Kudo (JPN)	32:42.6	Iwakichi Otsubo (JPN)	???	Kenji Mimura (JPN)	???
110 m hurdles	Yoshio Miki (JPN)	15.4	Felizardo Casia Sr (PHI)	???	Only two finishers	
200 m hurdles straight	Felizardo Casia Sr (PHI)	25.6	J. Cadores (PHI)	???	Masayuki Miyake (JPN)	???
4 × 200 m relay	Japan (JPN)	1:29.6	Philippines (PHI)		Only two finishers	
4 × 400 m relay	Japan (JPN)	3:24.2	Philippines (PHI)	???	China (CHN)	???
High jump	Simeon Toribio (PHI)	2.00 m	Kazuo Kimura (JPN)	1.96 m	Misao Ono (JPN)	1.91 m
Pole vault	Shuhei Nishida (JPN)	4.00 m	Senichi Asai (JPN) Mikio Oda (JPN)	3.78 m	Not awarded	
Long jump	Chuhei Nambu (JPN)	7.59 m	Mikio Oda (JPN)	7.46 m	Ichiro Tomiyama (JPN)	7.32 m
Triple jump	Mikio Oda (JPN)	14.74 m	Zensuke Tatenaka (JPN)	14.38 m	Yoshitoshi Shibata (JPN)	13.75 m
Shot put (light implement)	Shizuo Takada (JPN)	15.80 m	Teruo Aono (JPN)	15.01 m	Saburo Furukawa (JPN)	14.42 m
Discus throw	Masae Saito (JPN)	40.27 m	Yasuji Kuroda (JPN)	39.54 m	Yoshio Okita (JPN)	39.01 m
Javelin throw	Kosaku Sumiyoshi (JPN)	62.19 m	Kintaro Ito (JPN)	60.09 m	Noburo Suganumo (JPN)	58.40 m
Pentathlon	Kosaku Sumiyoshi (JPN)	2838 pts	Takeshi Jinno (JPN)	2641 pts	Yasuji Kuroda (JPN)	2627 pts
Decathlon	Tatsuo Toki (JPN)	5786 pts	Shuhei Nishida (JPN)	5644 pts	Regino Portacion (PHI)	5305 pts
