= Tuburan Tamse =

Filipino swimmer

Taburan Tamse
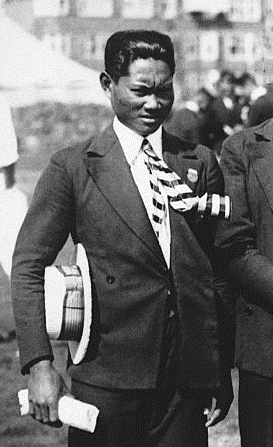
- Taburan Tamse at the 1928 Olympics

Personal information
- Full name: Taburan Tamse
- Born: 1911 Siasi, Sulu, Commonwealth of the Philippines
- Died: 1985 (aged 73–74) Zamboanga City, Philippines

Sport
- Sport: Swimming
- Strokes: Freestyle

Tuburan Kontong Tamse (born 1911) was a Filipino athlete, and the first Muslim Filipino Olympian.

== Biography ==
Tamse came from a small town in the municipality of Siasi, Sulu Province, in the southern part of the Philippines. At age 17, he was sent to participate in the 1928 Amsterdam Olympics in the Swimming event, together with fellow Filipino athletes Teofilo Yldefonso (swimming), Anselmo Gonzaga (athletics) and Simeon Toribio (athletics).

=== Olympics ===
The Ninth Olympiad was held in Amsterdam, Netherlands from May 17 – August 12, 1928. In its 1,107-page Official Report published by the International Olympic Committee, a total of 59 countries participated and the "Philippine Islands" sent two athletes to participate in swimming, namely Teofilo Yldefonso from Ilocos Norte, and Tuburan Tamse. Yldefonso competed in 200-meter breaststroke and earned a bronze medal in the finals, and the 17-year old Tamse competed in the 400-meter freestyle, finishing at 5 min and 39 4/5 secs, and the 1,500-meter freestyle, finishing at 20 min and 17 4/5 secs.

=== Later life and death ===
Tamse also competed in several Asian Games and later on pursued his career as a public servant in the government service and took his master's degree at the University of Santo Tomas (UST) in Manila, and then later became a chief in the Bureau of Internal Revenue (BIR), Zamboanga City. He died at the age of 74 in the year 1985 at Zamboanga City.

== See also ==
- Philippines at the 1928 Summer Olympics
