= Takayoshi Yoshioka =

Japanese sprinter

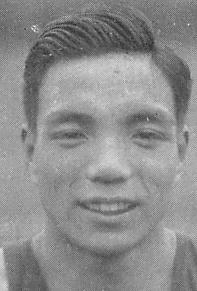

Personal information
- Born: June 2, 1909 Nishihama, Shimane, Japan
- Died: May 5, 1984 (aged 74) Fuchū, Tokyo, Japan
- Height: 1.65 m (5 ft 5 in)
- Weight: 61 kg (134 lb)

Sport
- Country: Japan
- Sport: Sprint running
Medal record
Far Eastern Championship Games
Bronze medal – third place	1927 Shanghai	100 m
Silver medal – second place	1927 Shanghai	200 m
Gold medal – first place	1930 Tokyo	100 m
Gold medal – first place	1930 Tokyo	200 m
Silver medal – second place	1934 Manila	100 m
Gold medal – first place	1934 Manila	200 m

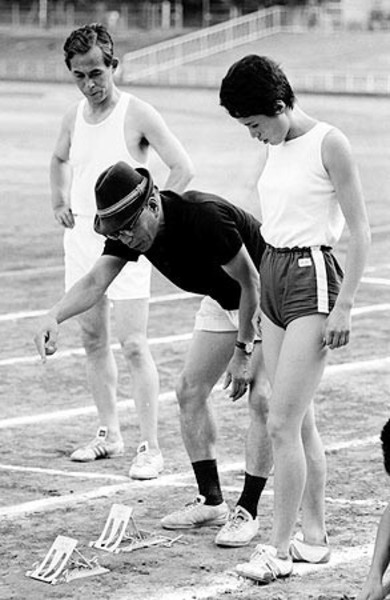
Naoto Tajima, Takayoshi Yoshioka and Ikuko Yoda

Takayoshi Yoshioka (吉岡 隆徳, Yoshioka Takayoshi; June 2, 1909 – May 5, 1984) was a Japanese sprinter who in 1935 jointly held the 100 m world record at 10.3 seconds. Four other men had clocked 10.3 s in 1935 or earlier, and Takayoshi was the only Asian person among them. He competed in various sprint events at the 1932 and 1936 Olympics and finished sixth in the 100 m in 1932. In retirement Yoshioka worked as an athletics coach.

== See also ==
- World Record progression 100 m men
