= Seiichiro Tsuda =

Japanese runner (1906–1991)

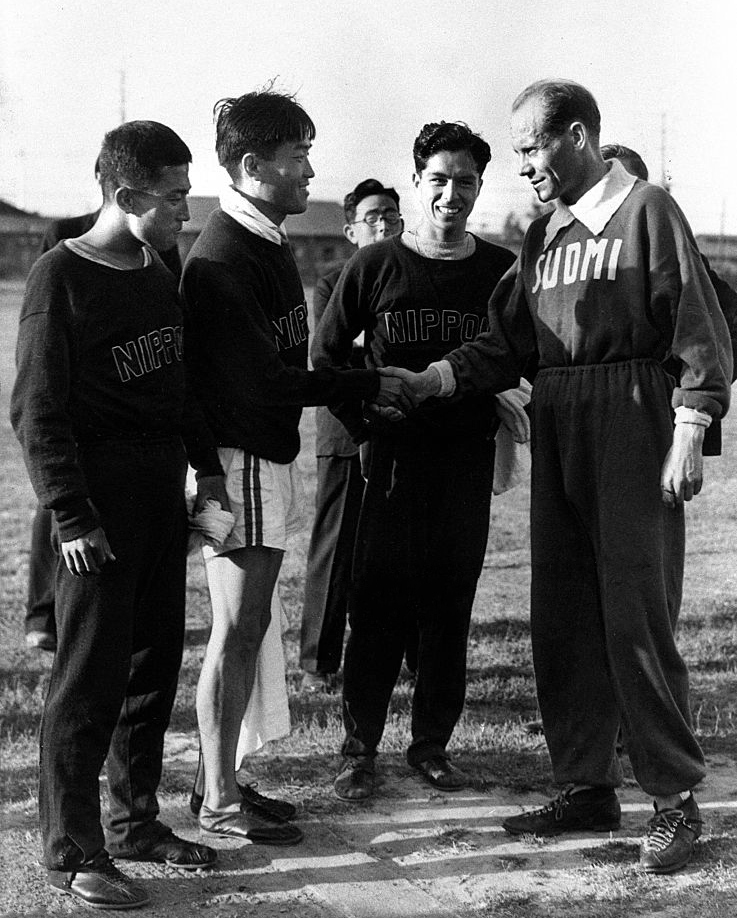
- Seiichiro Tsuda (2nd from right) meets Paavo Nurmi (right) at the 1932 Olympics

Personal information
- Born: July 26, 1906 Matsue, Shimane, Japan
- Died: September 20, 1991 (aged 85)
- Height: 1.66 m (5 ft 5 in)
- Weight: 56 kg (123 lb)

Sport
- Sport: Long-distance running
Medal record
Representing Japan
Far Eastern Championship Games
Gold medal – first place	1927 Shanghai	1500 m
Gold medal – first place	1930 Tokyo	1500 m

Seiichiro Tsuda (津田 晴一郎, Tsuda Seiichirō; July 26, 1906 – September 20, 1991) was a Japanese runner who won the 1500 metres event at the 1927 and 1930 Far Eastern Championship Games. He competed at the 1928 and 1932 Olympics in the marathon and finished in fifth and sixth place, respectively.
