= Guisit River =

River in Ilocos Norte, Philippines

- Guisit River mouth Guisit River (Philippines)
- Native name: Ilog Guisit (Tagalog)

Location
- Country: Philippines
- Region: Ilocos Region
- Province: Ilocos Norte
- Municipality: Piddig

Physical characteristics
- Mouth: Padsan River
  - coordinates: 18°08′28″N 120°41′17″E
- Length: 24.7 km (15.3 mi)
- Basin size: 178.3 km^{2} (68.8 sq mi)

The Guisit River is a stream in the Philippines. It is located in the town of Piddig, Ilocos Norte of the northern Ilocos Region, about 400 km north of Manila, the capital of the country. The estimate terrain elevation above sea level is 21 meters. The drainage area of the Guisit River is the middle north basin of the Laoag River. It originates from the north ridge which has an elevation ranging from 300 meters to 1,000 meters. The basin has an area of 178.3 square kilometers, with mountains and hills accounting 76% of the area. The channel of the Guisit River has a relevantly gentle slope of 0.41%.

The river is known for being the local training ground of the Philippines' first bemedaled Olympian, Teófilo Yldefonso and his siblings.
