= Athletics at the 1932 Summer Olympics – Men's high jump =

Men's high jump at the Games of the X Olympiad
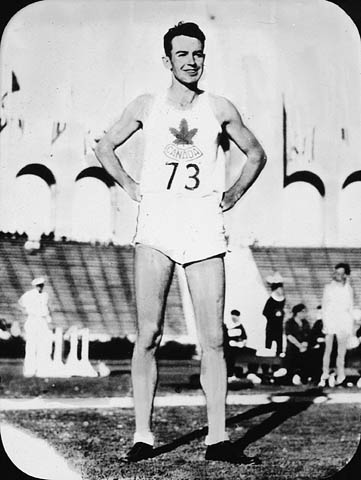
- Duncan McNaughton
- Venue: Los Angeles Memorial Coliseum
- Date: July 31, 1932
- Competitors: 14 from 10 nations
- Winning height: 1.97

Medalists
1st place, gold medalist(s)		Duncan McNaughton; Canada
2nd place, silver medalist(s)		Bob Van Osdel; United States
3rd place, bronze medalist(s)		Simeon Toribio; Philippines

The men's high jump event at the 1932 Olympic Games took place July 31. It was a final only format, no heats or qualifying jumps. Fourteen athletes from 10 nations competed. The 1930 Olympic Congress in Berlin had reduced the limit from 4 athletes per NOC to 3 athletes. The event was won by Duncan McNaughton of Canada, breaking the United States' dominance over the event; McNaughton was the first non-American to win. Bob Van Osdel of the United States took silver, while Simeon Toribio earned the Philippines' first medal in any track & field athletics event.

== Background ==
This was the ninth appearance of the event, which is one of 12 athletics events to have been held at every Summer Olympics. The returning finalists from the 1928 Games were bronze medalist Claude Ménard of France, fourth-place finisher Simeon Toribio of the Philippines, and sixth-place finisher Kazuo Kimura of Japan. American George Spitz had been the best jumper in 1932 but was suffering from an ankle injury.

Poland and Switzerland each made their debut in the event. The United States appeared for the ninth time, having competed at each edition of the Olympic men's high jump to that point.

== Competition format ==
Due to the small number of competitors (there were fewer entrants in 1932 than there had been finalists in 1928), the competition was a direct final. Athletes had three attempts at each height.

== Records ==
These were the standing world and Olympic records (in metres) prior to the 1932 Summer Olympics.

World record	Harold Osborn (USA)	2.03	Urbana, United States	27 May 1924
Olympic record	Harold Osborn (USA)	1.98	Paris, France	7 July 1924

No new world or Olympic records were set during the competition.

== Schedule ==
Date	Time	Round
Sunday, 31 July 1932	14:30	Final

== Results ==
Key

- o = Height cleared
- x = Height failed
- – = Height passed
- r = Retired
- SB = Season's best
- PB = Personal best
- NR = National record
- AR = Area record
- OR = Olympic record
- WR = World record
- WL = World lead
- NM = No mark
- DNS = Did not start
- DQ = Disqualified

Jump sequences are not known for the 1.80, 1.85, and 1.90 metres heights. Kimura's jump sequence for 1.94 metres is unknown, but he cleared that height.

There were two jump-offs. For first through fourth place, the jumpers had a jump-off that started at 6 ft 7 in (2.01 m); none cleared that height or 1.99 metres. At 1.97 metres (where they had tied during the final itself), McNaughton cleared on the first attempt to win gold. Details of the jump-off after that are not known. A second jump-off for fifth and sixth place was held; details are not known.

Rank	Athlete	Nation	1.80	1.85	1.90	1.94	1.97	2.00	Height
1st place, gold medalist(s)	Duncan McNaughton	Canada	o	o	xo	o	xxo	xxx	1.97
2nd place, silver medalist(s)	Bob Van Osdel	United States	o	o	xo	xo	o	xxx	1.97
3rd place, bronze medalist(s)	Simeon Toribio	Philippines	o	o	o	xxo	xxo	xxx	1.97
4	Cornelius Johnson	United States	o	o	o	xo	xo	xxx	1.97
5	Ilmari Reinikka	Finland	o	o	xo	xo	xxx	—	1.94
6	Kazuo Kimura	Japan	o	o	o	o	xxx	—	1.94
7	Misao Ono	Japan	o	o	o	x	—		1.90
7	Jerzy Pławczyk	Poland	o	o	o	x	—		1.90
9	Jack Portland	Canada	o	o	x	—			1.85
9	Claude Ménard	France	o	o	x	—			1.85
9	George Spitz	United States	o	o	x	—			1.85
9	Birger Haug	Norway	o	o	x	—			1.85
9	Angelo Tommasi	Italy	o	o	x	—			1.85
14	Paul Riesen	Switzerland	o	x	—				1.80
