= Kazuo Kimura =

Japanese high jumper

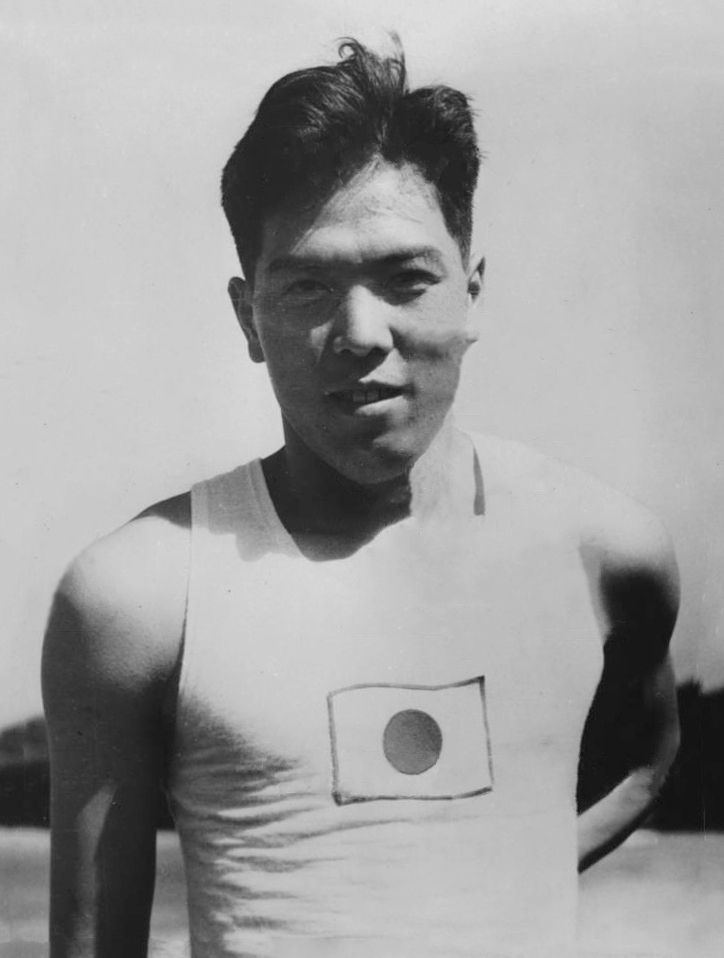
- Kimura at the 1932 Olympics

Personal information
- Born: 28 June 1909 Hyogo Prefecture, Japan
- Died: 4 November 1987 (aged 78)

Sport
- Sport: Athletics
- Event: High jump

Achievements and titles
- Personal best: 1.96 m (1930)
Medal record
Representing Japan
Far Eastern Championship Games
Silver medal – second place	1927 Shanghai	High jump
Silver medal – second place	1930 Tokyo	High jump

Kazuo Kimura (木村 一夫, Kimura Kazuo); born 28 June 1909) was a Japanese high jumper who won silver medals at the 1927 and 1930 Far Eastern Championship Games, losing to Simeon Toribio on all occasions. He placed sixth at the 1928 and 1932 Summer Olympics.
