= Mikio Oda =

Japanese athlete (1905–1998)

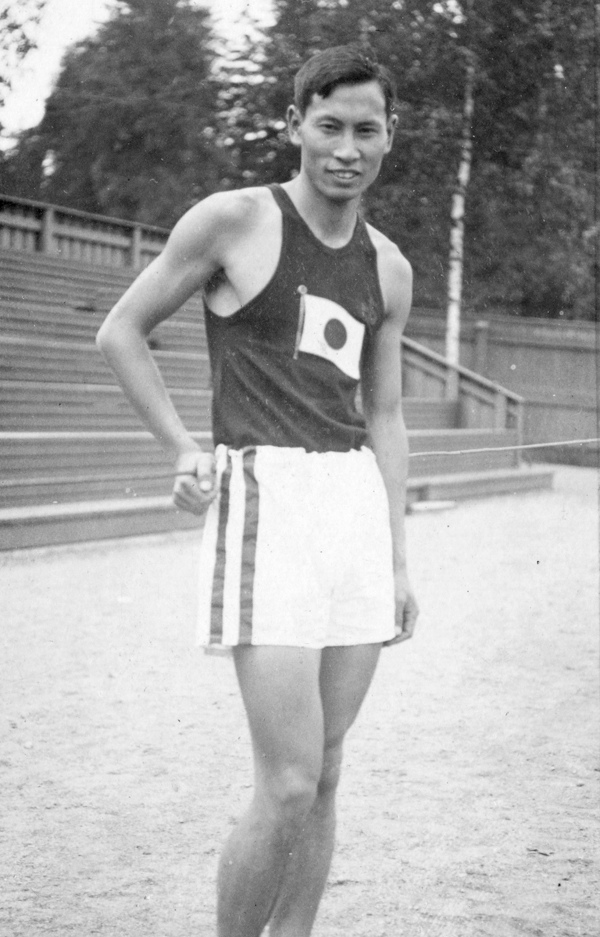
- Oda, c. 1928

Personal information
- Native name: 織田 幹雄
- Nationality: Japanese
- Born: 30 March 1905 Kaita, Hiroshima, Japan
- Died: 2 December 1998 (aged 93). Kamakura, Kanagawa, Japan
- Education: Waseda University
- Height: 1.67 m (5 ft 6 in)
- Weight: 65 kg (143 lb)

Sport
- Sport: Athletics
- Club: Waseda University, Tokyo
Medal record
Representing Japan
Olympic Games
Gold medal – first place	1928 Amsterdam	Triple jump
Far Eastern Championship Games
Gold medal – first place	1923 Osaka	Triple jump
Gold medal – first place	1923 Osaka	Long jump
Bronze medal – third place	1923 Osaka	High jump
Gold medal – first place	1925 Manila	Triple jump
Gold medal – first place	1927 Shanghai	Triple jump
Gold medal – first place	1927 Shanghai	Long jump
Gold medal – first place	1927 Shanghai	Decathlon
Gold medal – first place	1930 Tokyo	Triple jump
Silver medal – second place	1930 Tokyo	Long jump
Silver medal – second place	1930 Tokyo	Pole vault

Official Video of 1928 Triple Jump Video on YouTube

Mikio Oda (織田 幹雄, Oda Mikio; 30 March 1905 – 2 December 1998) was a Japanese athlete and the first Japanese Olympic gold medalist. He was the first Asian Olympic champion in an individual event.

== Biography ==
Oda was born in Kaita, Hiroshima Prefecture. At the age of 17, he set a new Japanese record for the triple jump at the 1923 Far Eastern Championship Games held in Osaka, and also won the long jump and high jump events. He was selected as a member of the Japanese Olympic team for the 1924 Summer Olympics in Paris, participating in all three events. However, he failed to reach the semifinals in the long jump and high jump, and placed sixth in the triple jump competition.

On his return to Japan, he enrolled at Waseda University, but returned to compete in the 1928 Summer Olympics in Amsterdam. Although he again did not reach the semifinals in the long jump and high jump, he won the triple jump event with a result of 15.21 meters, becoming the first Japanese athlete to win an Olympic gold medal.

In 1931, Oda graduated from Waseda University and was employed by the Asahi Shimbun newspaper. On 27 October of the same year, he established a new world record for the triple jump of 15.58 meters. Oda served as coach and captain of the Japanese athletics team at the 1932 Summer Olympics in Los Angeles.

Upon retirement from competitive athletics, he focused his efforts on sports administration, becoming a member of the Japanese Olympic Committee in 1948 and later taking part in the IAAF's technical committee. He also served as coach for the Japanese athletics team at the 1952 Summer Olympics at Helsinki and the 1954 Asian Games in Manila. During the 1964 Summer Olympics in Tokyo, the Olympic flag was raised to a height of exactly 15.21 meters, to pay respect to Oda's achievement 36 years earlier.

Oda field, a 400-meter running track in Yoyogi built for the 1964 Olympics, was named after Oda. His sporting achievements were recognized with the creation of the Mikio Oda Memorial International Amateur Athletic Game, an annual track and field competition that has been held since 1967.

He became a professor at Waseda University from 1965. In 1976, Oda was awarded the Olympic Order, the highest award of the Olympic Movement. In 1988, Oda was honored by the government as a Person of Cultural Merit, and in 1989, he was named honorary chairman of the Japan Association of Athletics Federations. In the final years of his life, Oda moved from his home at Aburatsubo in Yokosuka, Kanagawa to a nursing home in Kugenuma (Fujisawa, Kanagawa). His grave is at the Buddhist temple of Tokei-ji in Kamakura.

In 2000, Oda was posthumously chosen as the best Asian male athlete of the century by a panel of track and field experts.

== See also ==
- List of Olympic medalists in athletics (men)
- List of people on the postage stamps of Japan
- List of flag bearers for Japan at the Olympics
- List of Waseda University people

Records
Preceded by Nick Winter	Men's Triple Jump World Record Holder; 27 October 1931 – 14 August 1932	Succeeded by Chūhei Nambu
Sporting positions
Preceded by Enriquito Beech	Final Asian Games torchbearer Tokyo 1958	Succeeded by Effendi Saleh
Preceded by Enriquito Beech	Final Asian Games (Summer) torchbearer Tokyo 1958	Succeeded by Effendi Saleh
