= Adolfo Clouthier =

Mexican athlete

Personal information
- Born: 15 March 1909 Culiacán, Mexico
- Died: 12 April 2001 (aged 92)

Sport
- Sport: Athletics
- Event: Javelin throw

Adolfo Clouthier (15 March 1909 – 12 April 2001) was a Mexican athlete. He competed in the men's javelin throw at the 1932 Summer Olympics.
