= Teófilo Yldefonso =

Filipino swimmer (1903–1942)

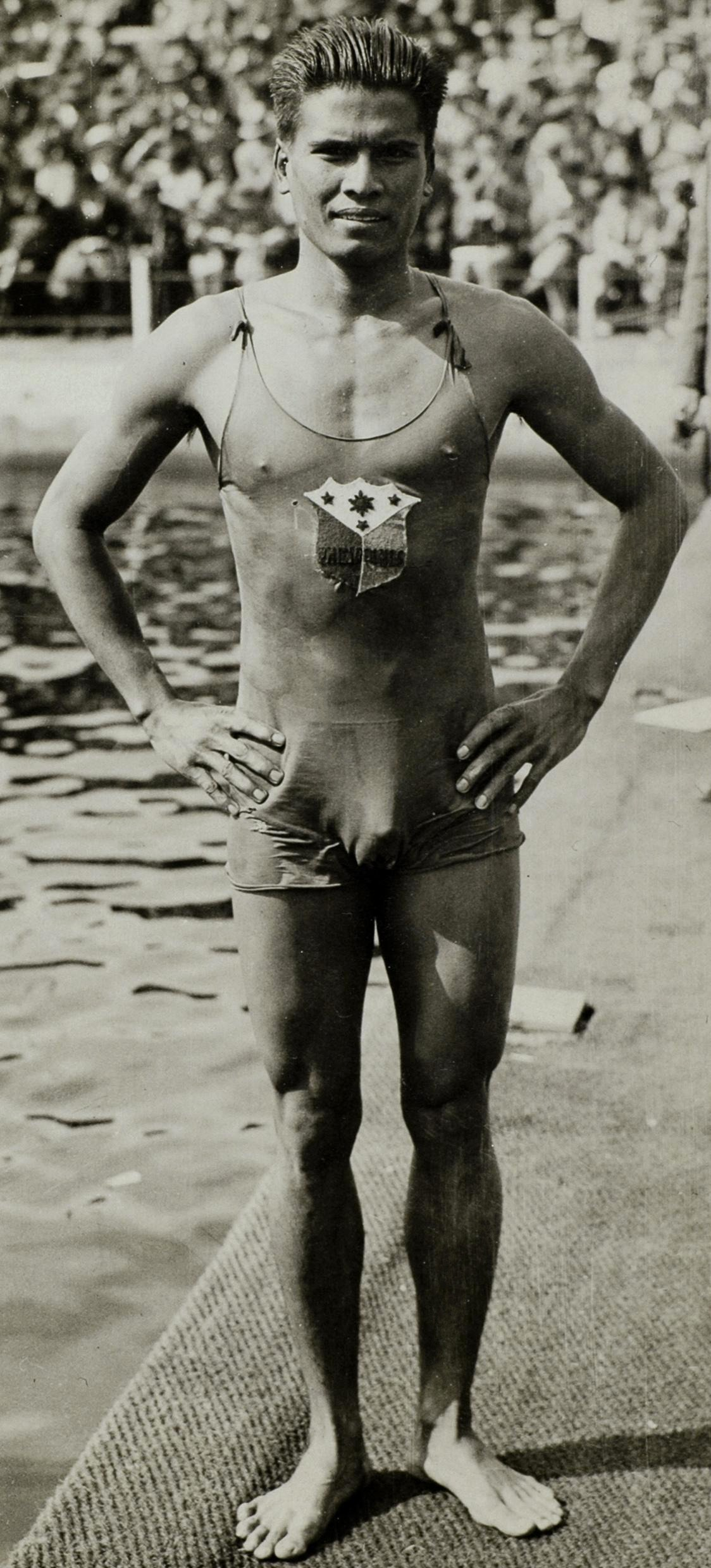
- Yldefonso at the 1928 Summer Olympics in Amsterdam
- Born: Teófilo Yldefonso y de la Cruz; November 5, 1903; Piddig, Ilocos Norte, Philippine Islands
- Died: June 19, 1942 (aged 38); Camp O'Donnell, Capas, Tarlac, Japanese-occupied Philippine Commonwealth
- Spouse: Manuela Ella (m. 1925)
- Children: 6
- Military career
- Allegiance: United States; Philippine Commonwealth
- Branch: United States Army
- Service years: 1922–1942
- Rank: Sergeant
- Unit: 57th Infantry Regiment (Philippine Scouts)
- Conflicts: Japanese occupation of the Philippines (World War II)
- Sports career
- Nickname: "Ilocano Shark"
- National team: Philippines
- Height: 1.70 m (5 ft 7 in)
- Weight: 73 kg (161 lb)
- Sport: Swimming
- Strokes: Breaststroke
Medal record
Men's swimming
Representing the Philippines
Olympic Games
Bronze medal – third place	1928 Amsterdam	200 m breaststroke
Bronze medal – third place	1932 Los Angeles	200 m breaststroke
Far Eastern Championship Games
Gold medal – first place	1923 Osaka	200 m breaststroke
Gold medal – first place	1927 Shanghai	200 m breaststroke
Gold medal – first place	1930 Tokyo	200 m breaststroke
Gold medal – first place	1934 Manila	200 m breaststroke

Teófilo E. Yldefonso (born Teófilo Yldefonso y de la Cruz; November 5, 1903 – June 19, 1942) was a Filipino breaststroke swimmer. He was the first Filipino and Southeast Asian to win an Olympic medal, and the first Filipino to win multiple medals.

== Early life ==
Teofilo Yldefonso was born on November 5, 1903, in Sitio Bayog, Piddig, Ilocos Norte to Felipe and Aniceta Yldefonso. He was the second among three siblings. His mother died after giving birth to his younger brother, who died at a young age. The Yldefonso siblings taught themselves to swim at the Guisit River.

Yldefonso joined 57th Infantry Regiment of the Philippine Scouts of the United States Army in 1922 upon turning 18 years old. It was with the military he was exposed to competitive swimming.

== Career ==
Yldefonso began joining regional swimming meets in the 1923. Competing in the 200-meter breaststroke, he won multiple gold medals in the Far Eastern Games (1923, 1927, 1930, and 1934). He also stood out in the Philippine vs. Formosa Dual Meets (1929, 1931, 1933, and 1937).

He collected a total of 144 medals in his career which lasted until 1937. He won two bronze medals in the 200 m breaststroke event, at the 1928 and 1932 Summer Olympics, and placed 7th in the 1936 edition.

== World War II and death ==
During World War II, Yldefonso fought against the Japanese in Bataan as part of the Philippine Scouts, reaching the rank of lieutenant.

He survived the Bataan Death March, but later died in Japanese captivity at Camp O'Donnell, Capas, Tarlac. His remains have never been recovered as he was interred in a mass grave, along with other dead soldiers. His name is etched in the Walls of the Missing at the Manila American Cemetery.

== Personal life ==
Yldefonso was married to Manuela Ella in 1925 with whom he had six children: Porfirio, Emilio, Felipe, Norma, Herminia, and Carmelito.

== Legacy ==
Bust and NHI historical marker for Yldefonso at the town plaza of his hometown of Piddig, Ilocos Norte

Yldefonso was named as part of the Hall of Fame by the International Swimming Federation in 2009. His unorthodox style of swimming would later become known as the "Yldefonso Stroke". It has been adapted by smaller swimmers, especially those from Asia, particularly the Japanese.

Yldefenso was often referred to as "The Father of the Modern Breaststroke" in European textbooks. He is credited for popularizing a style which brought breaststroke closer to the surface of the water rather than underwater which was the common during his time.

President Ferdinand Marcos also awarded Yldefonso the Presidential Award for Meritorious Service.

In 2006, the municipal government of Piddig unveiled a monument in Yldefonso's honor for his feats in swimming and World War II.

His daughter, Norma, competed at the 2nd Asian Games held in Manila, Philippines and won a silver medal in the 100m butterfly event.

Yldefonso's silhouette is featured in the logo of the 2025 Palarong Pambansa, which will be held in his native Ilocos Norte.
