= Piddig Church =

Roman Catholic church in Ilocos Norte, Philippines

- Saint Anne Parish Church
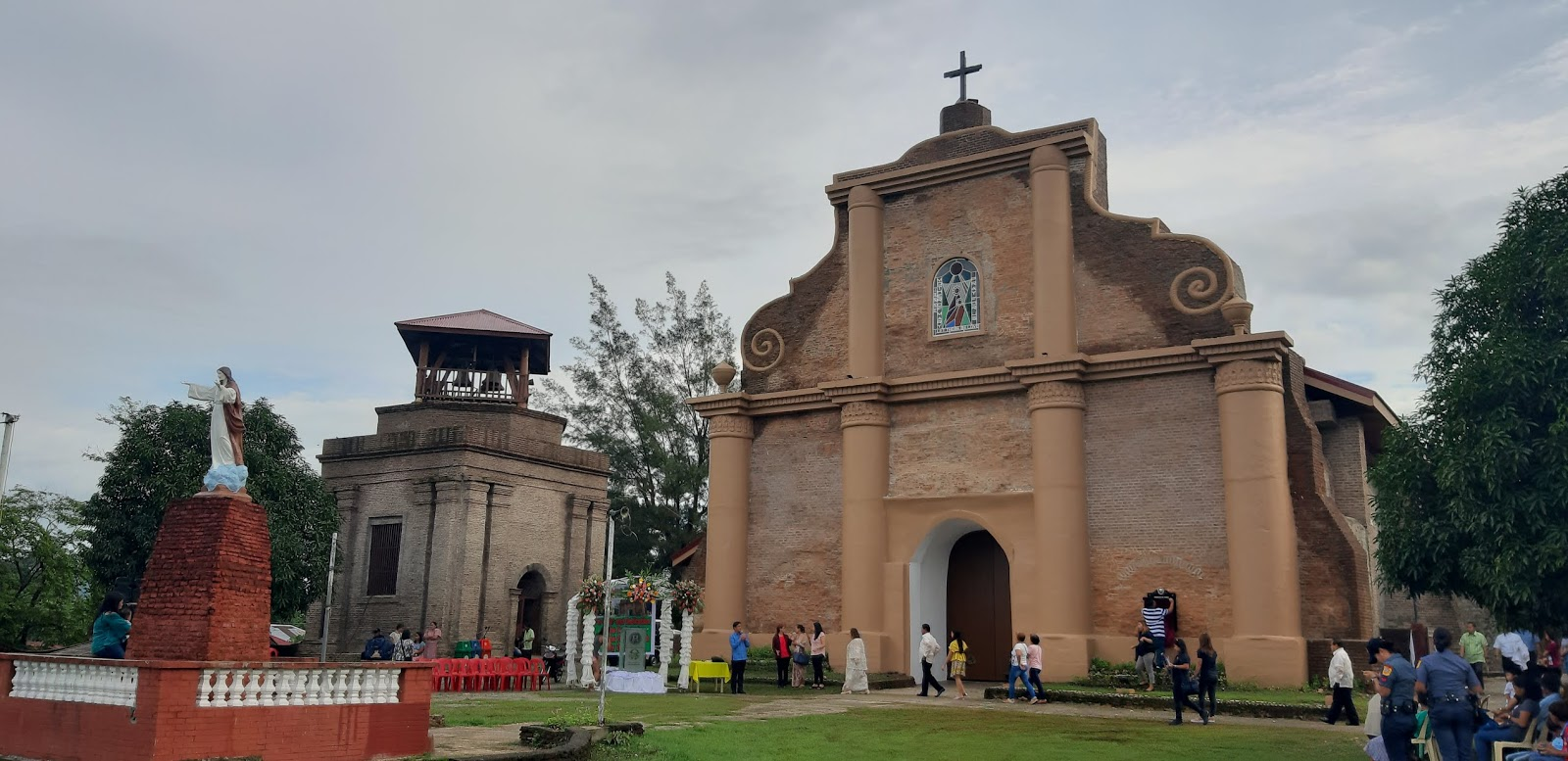
- The fully restored church seen from the church patio in 2019

- Location in Luzon Location in the Philippines
- 18°09′58″N 120°43′00″E
- Location: Piddig, Ilocos Norte
- Country: Philippines
- Denomination: Roman Catholic

History
- Founded: 1810 (as a Parish)
- Dedication: Saint Anne

Architecture
- Functional status: Active
- Architectural type: Church building
- Style: Baroque
- Completed: 2019 (from renovation during 2014 closure)
- Closed: 2014

Specifications
- Materials: Bricks and wood

Administration
- Province: Nueva Segovia
- Metropolis: Nueva Segovia
- Archdiocese: Nueva Segovia
- Diocese: Laoag

Clergy
- Archbishop: David William Antonio
- Bishop: Renato Mayugba

Saint Anne Parish Church, commonly known as Piddig Church, is a Roman Catholic parish church in Piddig, Ilocos Norte, Philippines. It is under the jurisdiction of the Diocese of Laoag. Originally a visita of Dingras, it was raised into an independent parish in 1770.

== History ==
Church NHC historical marker installed in 2019

Piddig was originally a visita or mission station of Dingras in 1598. It became an independent parish under the patronage of Saint Anne, Mother of the Blessed Virgin Mary in 1770. Father Isidro Campaner became its first parish priest. The church of Piddig was built also on that same year. During the Philippine–American War, the church was occupied by five-man team of Filipino guerrillas who repulsed early American attacks. On March 19, 1932, the tower was crippled by an earthquake. The damage was repaired by Monsignor Arsenio Pacis in the same year.

The 21st Infantry of the American forces later occupied the church complex during World War II. Piddig became the military capital of Ilocos Norte. All church records, the convent, sacristy, and furniture went up to flames when the Japanese Imperial Forces raided and burned the town. In 1965, restoration work was done in the façade and the interior of the church. The convent now houses the parochial school, Saint Anne Academy, during the term of Father Manuel Aspiras.

=== Closure and restoration ===
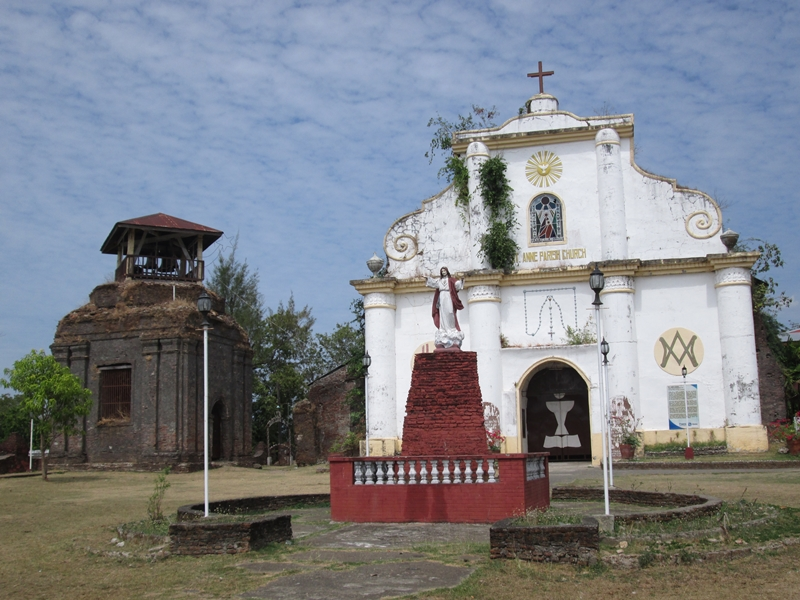
The church and its bell tower in 2015 prior to restoration

The church was closed for public worship after it was deemed "unsafe" after liturgical rite presided over by Laoag Bishop Renato P. Mayugba on September 14, 2014. According to Father Ericson Josue, the Commission Head of the Church Heritage of the diocese, the foundation of the church has been discovered to be weak to carry the massive walls of the edifice. The local government of Piddig called for the church to be declared a heritage structure after the National Commission for Culture and the Arts and National Historical Commission of the Philippines. The church was reopened in 2019 after five years of renovation.

== Features ==
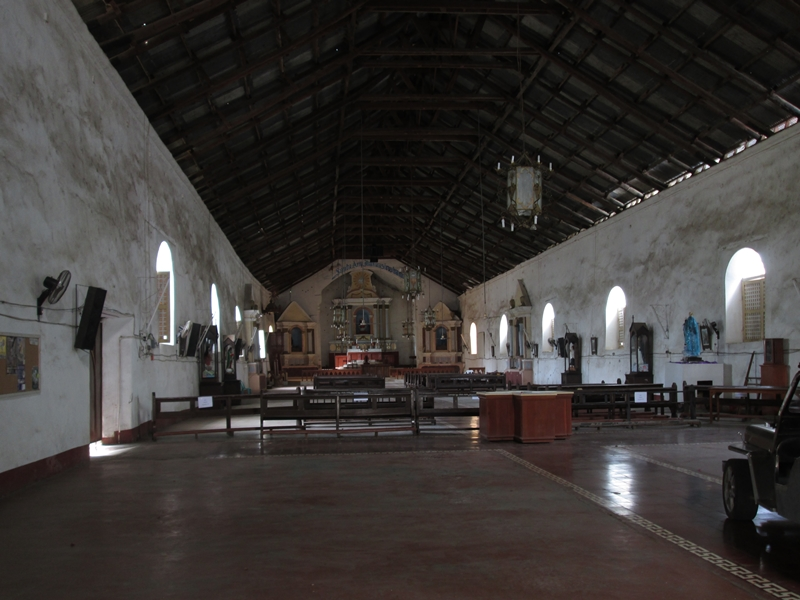
Church interior in 2015

The church of Piddig is located on top of a hill with a big central stairway, and stone and brick fence. The facade is inspired by the Jesuit Church of Il Gesu in Rome built in 1568. It has huge buttresses that serves as columns and volutes on the pediment. It still has the original wooden pulpit and a central retablo with the image of the patron saint, Saint Anne holding Mary on her lap. Its bell tower is now largely in ruins.

The cemetery at the back of the church, now in ruins, is attributed to Father Felipe Fernandez.

== Bibliography ==
- Dela Torre, Visitacion (2006). The Ilocos Heritage. Makati City: Tower Book House. ISBN 978-971-91030-9-7.
- Galende, Pedro (1987). Angels in Stone (1st ed.). G.A. Formoso Publishing. pp. 345–347.
- Legarda, Benita (1960). "Colonial Churches of Ilocos". Philippine Studies. 8 (1). Ateneo de Manila University: 121–158.
