= Bob Van Osdel =

American high jumper

Olympic medal record

Men's athletics

Representing the United States
Silver medal – second place	1932 Los Angeles	High jump

Bob Van Osdel (Robert Logan Van Osdel; April 1, 1910 – April 6, 1987) was an American athlete who competed mainly in the high jump.

He competed for the United States in the 1932 Summer Olympics held in Los Angeles, United States in the high jump where he won the silver medal. A teammate from the University of Southern California, Duncan McNaughton, won the gold medal representing Canada. According to the International Olympic Committee's website:

In the Olympic final, the battle for gold came down to a duel between the two friends. With the bar at 1.97m, Van Osdel approached McNaughton and advised him on improving his technique. "Get your kick working," he concluded, "and you will be over". That piece of advice and encouragement did the trick. McNaughton cleared the bar and won the gold medal, while Van Osdel missed and won the silver medal. In 1933, McNaughton's gold medal was stolen from his car. Van Osdel, now a dentist, made a mold from his own silver medal, poured gold into the mold, and sent the replica gold medal to McNaughton. Van Osdel and McNaughton remained friends for life.

Van Osdel served in Europe in World War II in the Army Corps of Dentists. He and his wife, Ruth, had two daughters, the elder of whom, Virginia, now owns the dentistry practice.
