= Athletics at the 1932 Summer Olympics – Men's javelin throw =

Men's javelin throw at the Games of the X Olympiad
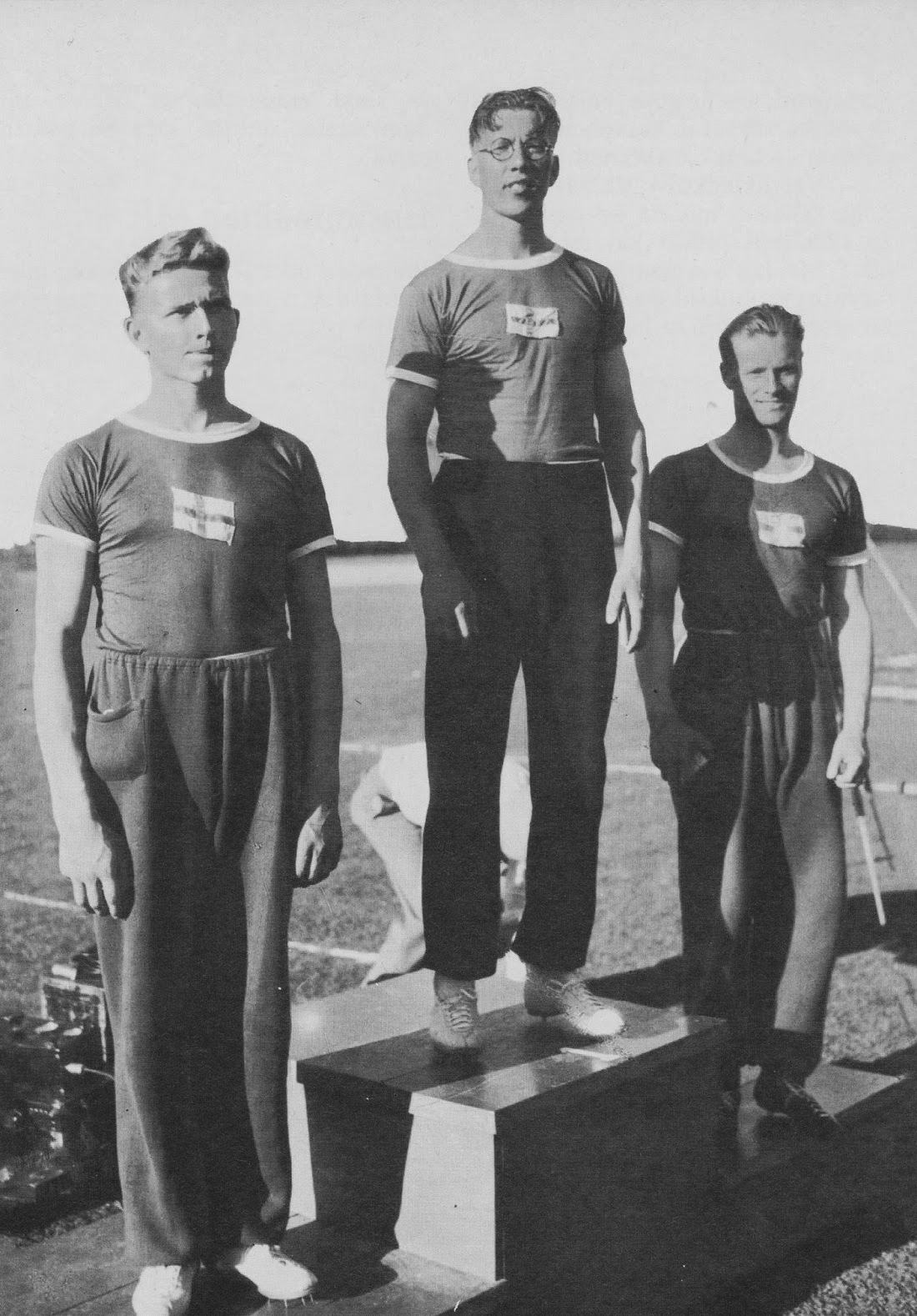
- Venue: Los Angeles Memorial Coliseum
- Dates: August 4, 1932
- Competitors: 13 from 7 nations

Medalists
1st place, gold medalist(s)		Matti Järvinen; Finland
2nd place, silver medalist(s)		Matti Sippala; Finland
3rd place, bronze medalist(s)		Eino Penttilä; Finland

The men's javelin throw event at the 1932 Olympic Games took place August 4.

== Results ==
=== Final standings ===
Rank	Name	Nationality	Distance	Notes
1st place, gold medalist(s)	Matti Järvinen	Finland	72.71	OR
2nd place, silver medalist(s)	Matti Sippala	Finland	69.80	
3rd place, bronze medalist(s)	Eino Penttilä	Finland	68.70	
4	Gottfried Weimann	Germany	68.18	
5	Lee Bartlett	United States	64.46	
6	Kenneth Churchill	United States	63.24	
7	Malcolm Metcalf	United States	61.89	
8	Kosaku Sumiyoshi	Japan	61.14	
9	Olav Sunde	Norway	60.81	
10	Saburo Nagao	Japan	59.83	
11	Heitor Medina	Brazil	58.00	
12	Adolfo Clouthier	Mexico	46.38	
13	Miguel Camberos	Mexico	41.71	

Key: OR = Olympic record
