= Duncan McNaughton =

Canadian athlete (1910–1998)

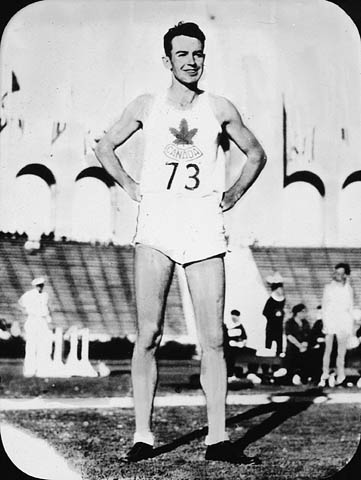
- McNaughton in 1932

Personal information
- Born: December 7, 1910 Cornwall, Ontario, Canada
- Died: January 15, 1998 (aged 87) Austin, Texas, US
Medal record
Men's athletics
Representing Canada
Gold medal – first place	1932 Los Angeles	High jump

Duncan Anderson McNaughton (December 7, 1910 – January 15, 1998) was a Canadian athlete, who competed mainly in the high jump. He went on to a career in petroleum geology.

== Biography ==
McNaughton was born in Cornwall, Ontario, and grew up in Vancouver, British Columbia. At the 1930 British Empire Games he finished fourth in the high jump event. He competed for Canada in the 1932 Summer Olympics, held in Los Angeles, United States, in the high jump where he won the gold medal. Bob Van Osdel, who took home the silver medal, was a close friend and teammate from the University of Southern California. Van Osdel helped coach McNaughton to his win during the final minutes of the competition. Later, in 1933 when McNaughton's medal was stolen from his car, Van Osdel—then a dentist—made a replica to replace it with a cast of his silver medal. The men remained friends until Van Osdel's death in 1987; McNaughton stayed in contact with his widow until his death in 1998.

McNaughton studied geology at the University of Southern California and went on to receive a Master's degree from the California Institute of Technology. He worked for the Geological Survey of Canada, then explored for oil in South America and later served with the Royal Canadian Air Force during World War II. He received a PhD in geology from USC and was also an assistant professor of geology there. McNaughton later helped initiate oil and gas exploration in the Amadeus Basin of central Australia and Palm Valley.

McNaughton died at his home in Austin, Texas in 1998.

== Honors ==
McNaughton was inducted into the Canada's Sports Hall of Fame in 1955. An annual grant is awarded in his name to a graduate student by the American Association of Petroleum Geologists.
