= Anselmo Gonzaga =

Filipino sprinter

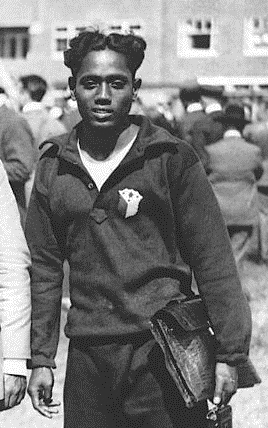
- Gonzaga at the 1928 Olympics

Personal information
- Nationality: Filipino
- Born: April 21, 1906 Cainta, Rizal, Philippine Islands
- Died: 1992 (aged 85–86) Cainta, Rizal, Philippines

Sport
- Country: Philippines
- Sport: Track and field
- Events: 100 m, 200 m
- Club: Silliman University

Achievements and titles
- Personal bests: 100 m – 10.5 (1927); 200 m – 21.5 (1930)
Medal record
Representing Philippines
Far Eastern Championship Games
Gold medal – first place	1927 Shanghai	200 m
Gold medal – first place	1927 Shanghai	4 × 200 m relay
Silver medal – second place	1930 Tokyo	200 m
Silver medal – second place	1930 Tokyo	100 m

Anselmo Gonzaga (April 21, 1906 – 1992) was a Filipino sprinter. While attending Silliman University, he set a national record of 10.5 seconds in the 100 metres and ranked fourth in the world. He was thus selected to compete at the 1927 Far Eastern Championship Games and won two gold medals. With his results, he was selected to compete at the 1928 Summer Olympics but did not medal in any of his entered events.

Gonzaga also competed at the 1930 Far Eastern Championship Games and won two silver medals. He retired in 1932 but came out of retirement the following year and also entered in the nation's tryouts for the 1936 Summer Olympics but was unsuccessful.

== Biography ==
Anselmo Gonzaga was born on April 21, 1906, in Cainta, Rizal. For his studies, he attended Silliman University in Dumaguete, Negros Oriental.

In 1927, he set a national record of 10.5 seconds in the 100 metres, which placed him fourth in the world rankings. He was later selected to represent the country at the 1927 Far Eastern Championship Games and won gold medals in the men's 200 metres, beating defending champion David Nepomuceno, and the men's 4 × 200 metres relay. Due to his results at the Games, Gonzaga was selected to compete at the 1928 Summer Olympics in Amsterdam.

For the 1928 Summer Games, Gonzaga was assigned as the flag bearer for the Philippines during the opening ceremony. He first competed in the sixteenth preliminary of the men's 100 metres on 29 July against three other sprinters. There, he placed second and advanced to the quarterfinals held on the same day. He participated in the fifth quarterfinal against four other sprinters and recorded an estimated time of 11.2 seconds, placing fourth and did not advance to the semifinals. Two days later, he competed in the fifth preliminary heat of the men's 200 metres against three other sprinters. He recorded a time of 22.7 seconds and placed third, failing to advance further into competition.

After the 1928 Summer Games, Gonzaga was selected to compete for the Philippines at the 1930 Far Eastern Championship Games and earned silver medals in the men's 100 metres and men's 200 metres. Four years later, he retired from competition after winning the men's 100 metres and 200 metres in the Philippine National Championships. Though, he came back to competition after a year and had signed up for a meet organized by the Philippine Amateur Athletic Federation.

In hopes to qualify for the 1936 Summer Olympics, Gonzaga competed in the Philippine Islands track and field Olympic tryouts though placed fifth in the men's 100 metres and third in the men's 200 metres, failing to be selected. After his athletic career, he served as an official in the sport and later died in 1992.
