= Eino Penttilä =

Finnish javelin thrower

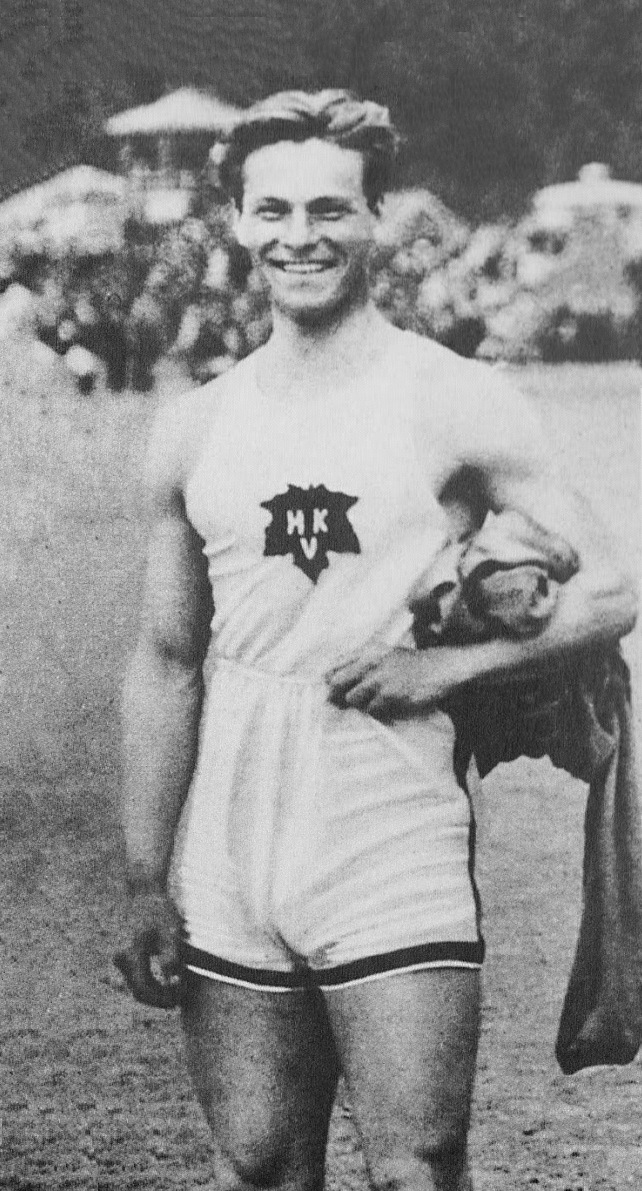

Personal information
- Born: 27 August 1906 Joutseno, Finland
- Died: 24 November 1982 (aged 76) Pori, Finland
- Height: 1.79 m (5 ft 10 in)
- Weight: 81 kg (179 lb)

Sport
- Sport: Athletics
- Event: Javelin throw
- Club: HKV, Helsinki

Achievements and titles
- Personal best: 70.64 m (1932)
Medal record
Representing Finland
Olympic Games
Bronze medal – third place	1932 Los Angeles	Javelin throw

Eino Penttilä (27 August 1906 – 24 November 1982) was a Finnish javelin thrower who won a bronze medal at the 1932 Summer Olympics, behind teammates Matti Järvinen and Matti Sippala.

== Career ==
Penttlä was a Biathlon competitor who changed to javelin throw at the age of 15. He won the national title in 1926–1928, and set a new world record in October 1927. He was a favorite at the 1928 Olympics, but finished sixth due to an elbow injury. After that he lost domestic competitions to Matti Järvinen, and at the 1932 Games finished third. He retired in 1936 due to the old injury.
