= List of flag bearers for Japan at the Olympics =

Japan at the Olympics
- IOC code: JPN
- NOC: Japanese Olympic Committee
- Website: www.joc.or.jp (in Japanese and English)
- Medals: Gold 206 Silver 191 Bronze 221 Total 618

Summer appearances
- 1912; 1920; 1924; 1928; 1932; 1936; 1948; 1952; 1956; 1960; 1964; 1968; 1972; 1976; 1980; 1984; 1988; 1992; 1996; 2000; 2004; 2008; 2012; 2016; 2020; 2024

Winter appearances
- 1928; 1932; 1936; 1948; 1952; 1956; 1960; 1964; 1968; 1972; 1976; 1980; 1984; 1988; 1992; 1994; 1998; 2002; 2006; 2010; 2014; 2018; 2022; 2026

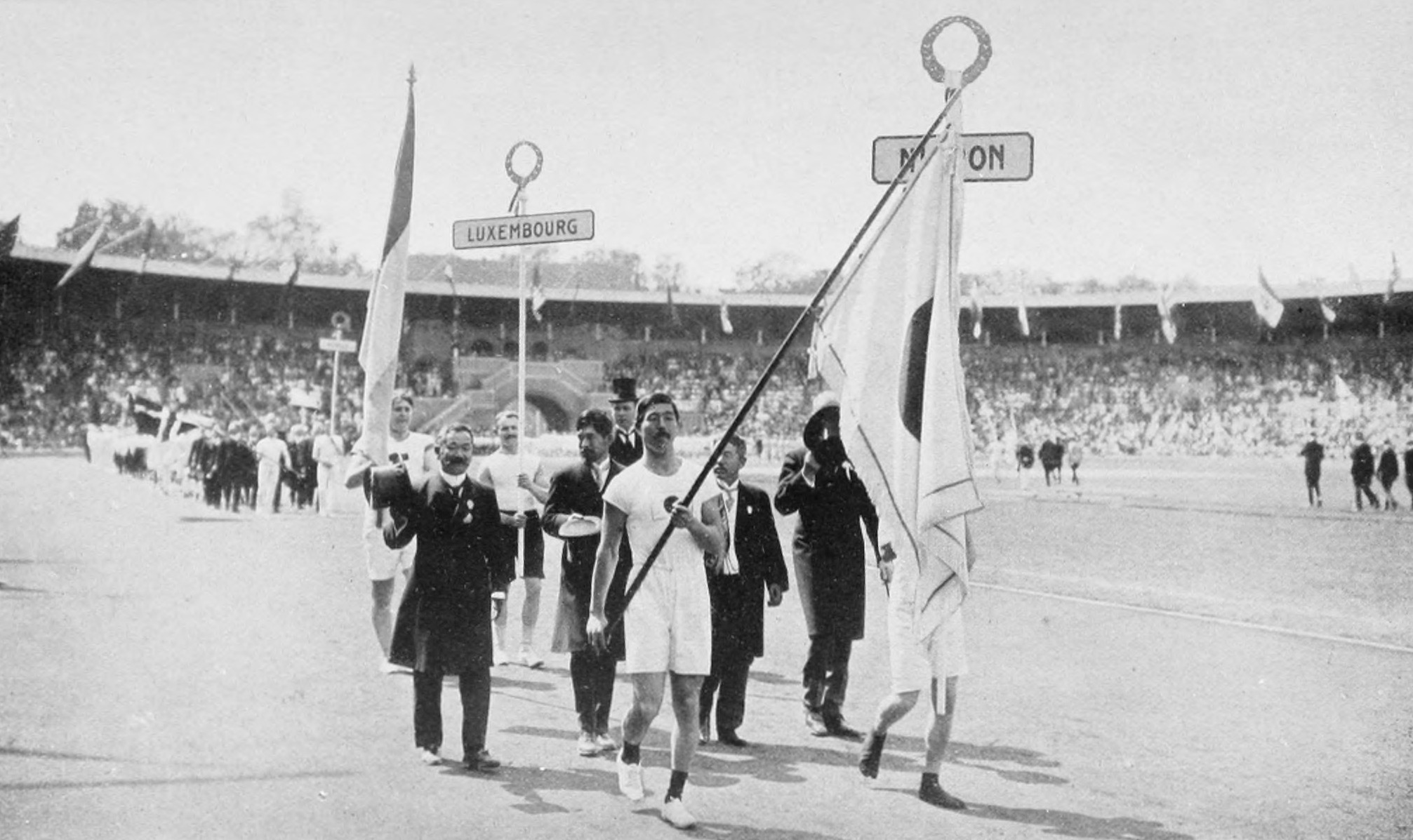
Japan at the 1912 Summer Olympics

This is a list of flag bearers who have represented Japan at the Olympics.

Flag bearers carry the national flag of their country at the opening ceremony of the Olympic Games.

#	Event year	Season	Flag bearer	Sport
1	1912	Summer	Yahiko Mishima	Athletics
2	1920	Summer	Gensabulo Noguchi	Athletics
3	1928	Winter	Subaru Takahashi	Cross-country skiing
4	1928	Summer	Yonetaro Nakazawa	Athletics
5	1932	Summer	Mikio Oda	Athletics
6	1936	Winter	Kazuyoshi Oimatsu	Figure skating
7	1936	Summer	Kenkichi Oshima	Athletics
8	1952	Summer	Bunkichi Sawada	Athletics
9	1956	Winter	Hiroshi Yoshizawa	Ski jumping & Nordic combined
10	1956	Summer	Shozo Sasahara	Wrestling
11	1960	Winter	Junko Ueno	Figure skating
12	1960	Summer	Takashi Ono	Gymnastics
13	1964	Winter	Sadao Kikuchi	Ski jumping
14	1964	Summer	Makoto Fukui	Swimming
15	1968	Winter	Takaaki Kaneiri	Ice hockey
16	1968	Summer	Yukio Endo	Gymnastics
17	1972	Winter	Mineyuki Mashiko	Ski jumping
18	1972	Summer	Masatoshi Shinomaki	Judo
19	1976	Winter	Masaki Suzuki	Speed skating
20	1976	Summer	Katsutoshi Nekoda	Volleyball
21	1980	Winter	Osamu Wakabayashi	Ice hockey
22	1984	Winter	Tadayuki Takahashi	Figure skating
23	1984	Summer	Shigenobu Murofushi	Athletics
24	1988	Winter	Seiko Hashimoto	Speed skating
25	1988	Summer	Mikako Kotani	Synchronized swimming
26	1992	Winter	Tsutomu Kawasaki	Short track speed skating
27	1992	Summer	Kumi Nakada	Volleyball
28	1994	Winter	Reiichi Mikata	Nordic combined
29	1996	Summer	Ryoko Tamura	Judo
30	1998	Winter	Hiroyasu Shimizu	Speed skating
31	2000	Summer	Kosei Inoue	Judo
32	2002	Winter	Eriko Sanmiya	Speed skating
33	2004	Summer	Kyoko Hamaguchi	Wrestling
34	2006	Winter	Joji Kato	Speed skating
35	2008	Summer	Ai Fukuhara	Table tennis
36	2010	Winter	Tomomi Okazaki	Speed skating
37	2012	Summer	Saori Yoshida	Wrestling
38	2014	Winter	Ayumi Ogasawara	Curling
39	2016	Summer	Keisuke Ushiro	Athletics
40	2018	Winter	Noriaki Kasai	Ski jumping
41	2020	Summer	Rui Hachimura	Basketball
41	2020	Summer	Yui Susaki	Wrestling
42	2022	Winter	Akito Watabe	Nordic combined
42	2022	Winter	Arisa Go	Speed skating
43	2024	Summer	Shigeyuki Nakarai	Breaking
43	2024	Summer	Misaki Emura	Fencing
44	2026	Winter	Wataru Morishige	Speed skating
44	2026	Winter	Sena Tomita	Snowboarding

== See also ==
- Japan at the Olympics
