= Paul Riesen =

Swiss high jumper

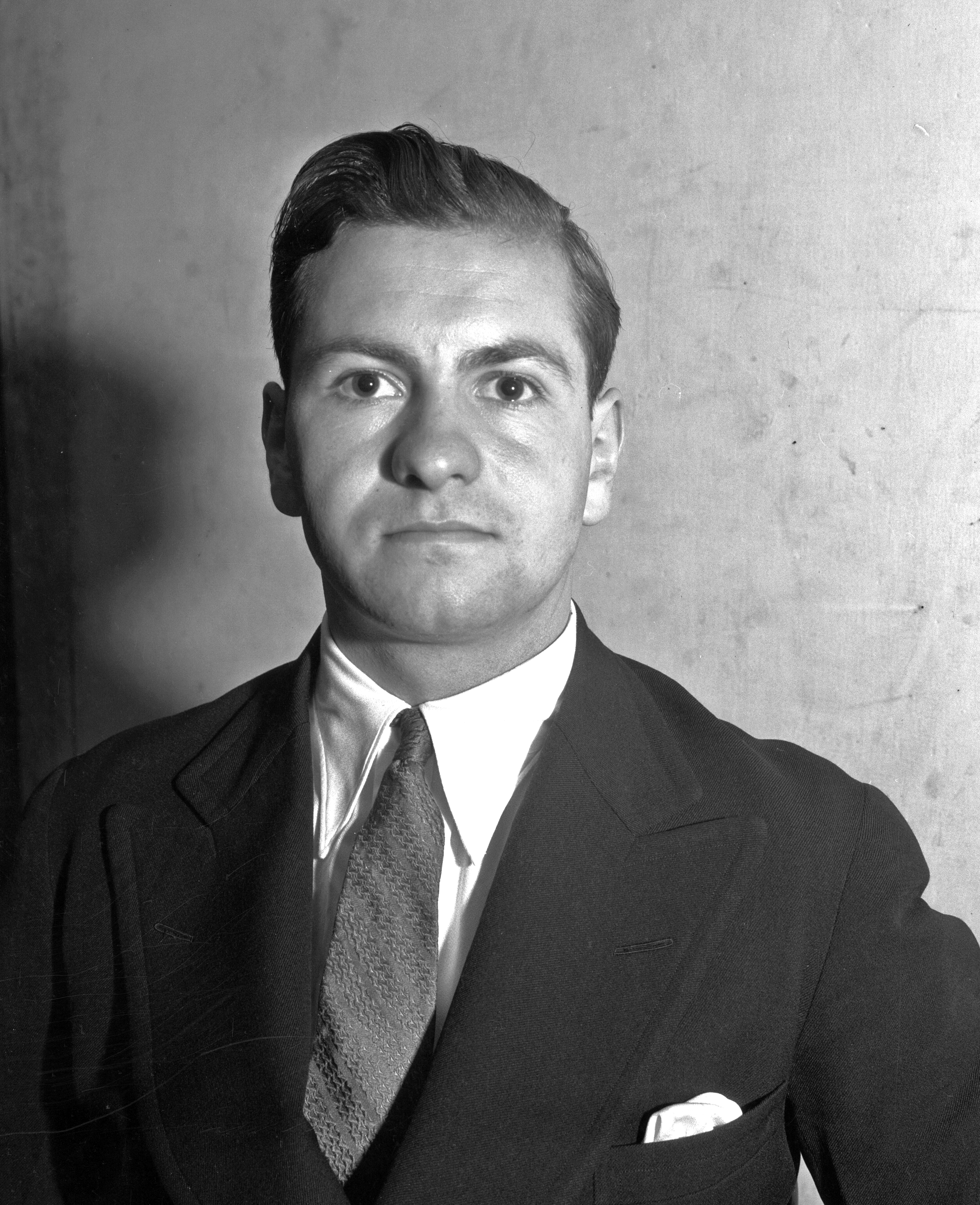
- Riesen in 1932

Personal information
- Nationality: Swiss
- Born: 1 October 1906

Sport
- Sport: Athletics
- Event: High jump

Paul Riesen (born 1 October 1906, date of death unknown) was a Swiss athlete. He competed in the men's high jump at the 1932 Summer Olympics.
