= Heitor Medina =

Brazilian javelin thrower (1910–2005)

Personal information
- Full name: Heitor Segundo Guilherme Medina
- Born: 22 November 1910 Rio de Janeiro, Brazil
- Died: 2 January 2005 Curitiba, Brazil

Sport
- Sport: Athletics
- Event: Javelin throw

Heitor Medina (22 November 1910 – 2 January 2005) was a Brazilian athlete. He competed in the men's javelin throw at the 1932 Summer Olympics.
