= Miguel Camberos =

Mexican javelin thrower

Personal information
- Born: 18 June 1905 Copala, Mexico
- Died: 19 May 1992 (aged 86) Walnut Creek, California, United States

Sport
- Sport: Athletics
- Event: Javelin throw

Miguel Camberos (18 June 1905 – 19 May 1992) was a Mexican athlete. He competed in the men's javelin throw at the 1932 Summer Olympics.
