= Niño Ramírez =

Filipino long jumper (1912–??)

Personal information
- Nationality: Filipino
- Born: January 16, 1912

Sport
- Sport: Athletics
- Event: Long jump

Niño Ramírez (born January 16, 1912) was a Filipino athlete. He won a bronze medal in the long jump event at the 1934 Far Eastern Championship Games. He also competed in the men's long jump at the 1936 Summer Olympics.
