= Misao Ono =

Japanese high jumper

Personal information
- Nationality: Japanese
- Born: 27 May 1908

Sport
- Sport: Athletics
- Event: High jump

Misao Ono (小野 操, Ono Misao; born 27 May 1908, date of death unknown) was a Japanese track and field athlete. He competed in the men's high jump at the 1932 Summer Olympics.
