= Hideo Tanaka (runner) =

Japanese long-distance runner

Personal information
- Nationality: Japanese
- Born: 2 September 1909

Sport
- Sport: Athletics
- Event(s): 5000 metres, 3000 metres steeplechase, high jump

Hideo Tanaka (田中 秀雄, Tanaka Hideo; born 2 September 1909, date of death unknown) was a Japanese long-distance runner. He competed in the men's 5000 metres and men's 3000 metres steeplechase at the 1936 Summer Olympics.
