= Piddig =

Municipality in Ilocos Norte, Philippines

- Municipality
- Municipality of Piddig
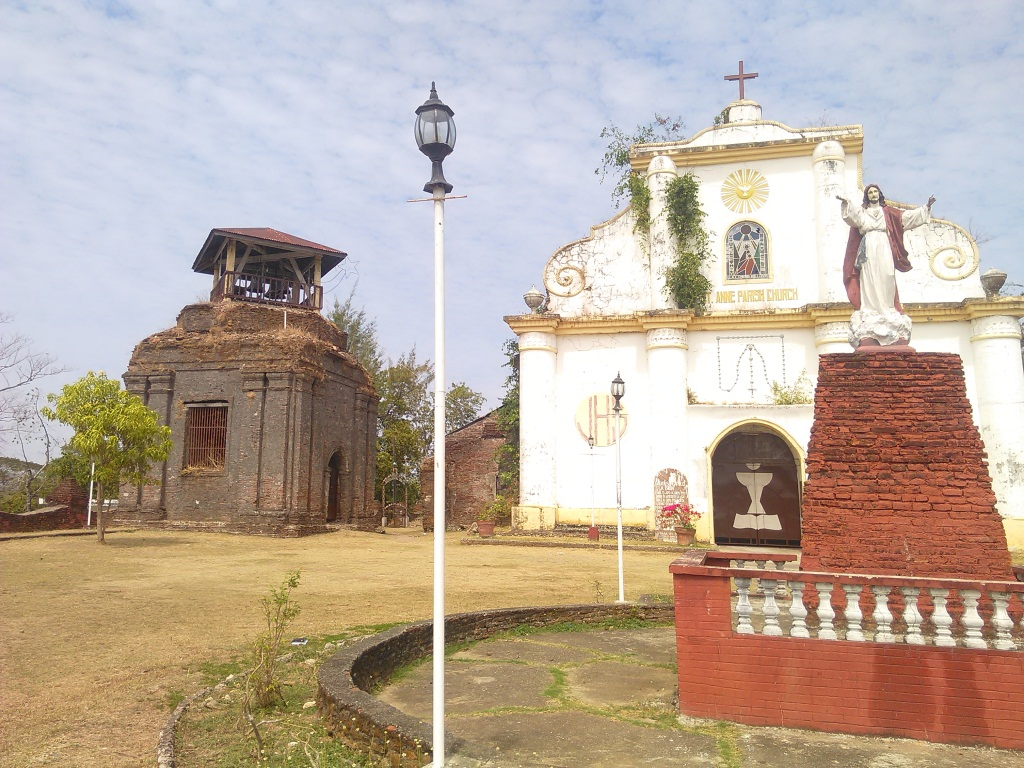
- View of the Saint Anne Parish Church from the church patio

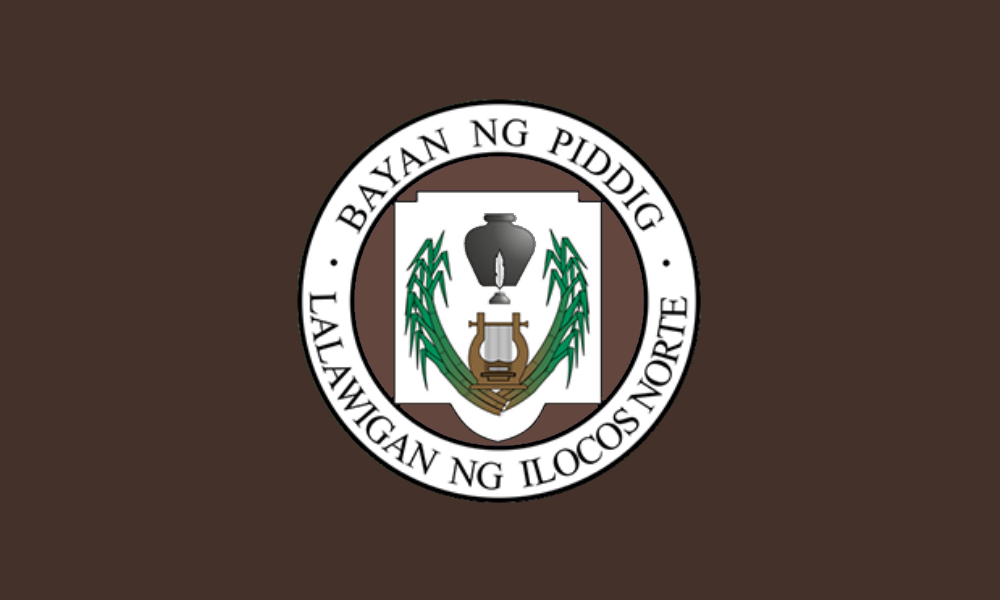
- Flag Seal

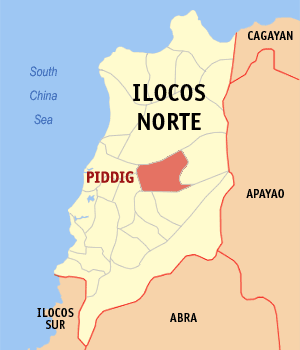
- Map of Ilocos Norte with Piddig highlighted
- Interactive map of Piddig
- Location within the Philippines
- Coordinates: 18°09′53″N 120°43′02″E
- Country: Philippines
- Region: Ilocos Region
- Province: Ilocos Norte
- District: 1st district
- Barangays: 23 (see Barangays)

Government
  - Type: Sangguniang Bayan
  - Mayor: Georgina Salazar Guillen
  - Vice Mayor: Edwin E. Salazar
  - Representative: Sandro Marcos
  - Municipal Council: Members: Zaida Hershey S. Mandac; Dexter M. Yapo; Wilbor A. Bringas; Lendell Benedict M. Chua; Nenita T. Alejandro; Marianito P. Foronda; Rey M. Nicolas; Romulo E. Hilario
  - Electorate: 15,534 voters (2025)

Area
  - Total: 216.20 km^{2} (83.48 sq mi)
- Elevation: 250 m (820 ft)
- Highest elevation: 954 m (3,130 ft)
- Lowest elevation: 15 m (49 ft)

Population (2024 census)
  - Total: 22,781
  - Density: 105.37/km^{2} (272.91/sq mi)
  - Households: 5,487

Economy
  - Income class: 1st municipal income class
  - Poverty incidence: 4.95% (2023)
  - Revenue: ₱ 483.8 million (2024)
  - Assets: ₱ 1,225 million (2024)
  - Expenditure: ₱ 198 million (2024)
  - Liabilities: ₱ 134.1 million (2024)

Service provider
  - Electricity: Ilocos Norte Electric Cooperative (INEC)
- Time zone: UTC+8 (PST)
- ZIP code: 2912
- PSGC: 0102818000
- IDD : area code: +63 (0)77
- Native languages: Ilocano; Tagalog

Piddig, officially the Municipality of Piddig (Ilocano: Ili ti Piddig; Filipino: Bayan ng Piddig) is a municipality in the province of Ilocos Norte, Philippines. According to the 2024 census, it has a population of 22,781 people.

The town is known for its role in the Basi Revolt which was led by Pedro Mateo, a native of Piddig. Today, Piddig is known for its basi and for their sariwagwag, a dish made out of gabi leaves with fresh shrimps that are freshly gathered from their rich river. The municipio (town hall) is located on top of a hill offering panoramic views of fields and mountains.

Piddig is also the birthplace of Teófilo Yldefonso, a Filipino swimmer who is the first Filipino and Southeast Asian to win an Olympic medal, and the first Filipino to win multiple medals.

== Geography ==
The Municipality of Piddig's terrain is primarily hilly, with rice plains interspersed in between. It sits at an elevation higher than most towns in Ilocos Norte. The terrain is ideal for hiking given its variety of rivers, forests, and fields.

Piddig is situated 18.45 kilometres (11.46 mi) from the provincial capital Laoag, and 503.33 kilometres (312.75 mi) from the country's capital city of Manila.

=== Barangays ===
Piddig is politically subdivided into 23 barangays. Each barangay consists of puroks and some have sitios.

- Ab-abut
- Abucay
- Anao (Poblacion)
- Arua-ay
- Bimmanga
- Boyboy
- Cabaroan (Poblacion)
- Calambeg
- Callusa
- Dupitac
- Estancia
- Gayamat
- Lagandit
- Libnaoan
- Loing (Poblacion)
- Maab-abaca
- Mangitayag
- Maruaya
- San Antonio
- Santa Maria
- Sucsuquen
- Tangaoan
- Tonoton

=== Climate ===
Climate data for Piddig, Ilocos Norte
Month	Jan	Feb	Mar	Apr	May	Jun	Jul	Aug	Sep	Oct	Nov	Dec	Year
Mean daily maximum °C (°F)	27 (81)	28 (82)	30 (86)	32 (90)	31 (88)	31 (88)	30 (86)	30 (86)	30 (86)	29 (84)	28 (82)	27 (81)	29 (85)
Mean daily minimum °C (°F)	20 (68)	20 (68)	21 (70)	23 (73)	25 (77)	25 (77)	25 (77)	25 (77)	24 (75)	23 (73)	22 (72)	21 (70)	23 (73)
Average precipitation mm (inches)	38 (1.5)	37 (1.5)	37 (1.5)	49 (1.9)	181 (7.1)	214 (8.4)	264 (10.4)	251 (9.9)	243 (9.6)	229 (9.0)	129 (5.1)	96 (3.8)	1,768 (69.7)
Average rainy days	11.6	10.7	12.4	15.2	22.6	25.0	26.1	24.9	24.3	19.2	16.4	15.4	223.8
Source: Meteoblue

== Demographics ==
Population census of Piddig

Year	Pop.	±% p.a.
1903	9,172	—
1918	11,301	+1.40%
1939	10,511	−0.34%
1948	10,496	−0.02%
1960	11,614	+0.85%
1970	13,065	+1.18%
1975	13,933	+1.30%
1980	14,774	+1.18%

Year	Pop.	±% p.a.
1990	17,078	+1.46%
1995	17,797	+0.78%
2000	19,059	+1.48%
2007	20,034	+0.69%
2010	20,606	+1.03%
2015	21,497	+0.81%
2020	22,475	+0.94%
2024	22,781	+0.33%

Source: Philippine Statistics Authority

In the 2024 census, the population of Piddig was 22,781 people, with a density of 110 inhabitants per square kilometre or 280 inhabitants per square mile.

== Economy ==
Poverty incidence of Piddig (%)

Source: Philippine Statistics Authority

Piddig's main economic source is agriculture. Core crops of Piddig include rice, corn, coffee, tobacco, garlic, shallots, and vegetables.

== Government ==
=== Local government ===
Piddig, belonging to the first congressional district of the province of Ilocos Norte, is governed by a mayor designated as its local chief executive and by a municipal council as its legislative body in accordance with the Local Government Code. The mayor, vice mayor, and the councilors are elected directly by the people through an election which is being held every three years.

=== Elected officials ===
Members of the Municipal Council (2025–2028)
Position	Name
Congressman	Ferdinand Alexander A. Marcos III
Mayor	Georgina S. Guillen
Vice-Mayor	Edwin E. Salazar
Councilors	John Patrick B. Salazar
Councilors	Dexter M. Yapo
Councilors	Gian Nicolette G. Chua
Councilors	Juanito A. Bayag
Councilors	Catherine B. Agohob
Councilors	Generoso D. Aquino Jr.
Councilors	Elybert M. Rarogal
Councilors	Larry B. Borromeo

== Culture ==
Cultural Property wmph identifier (Note: wmph is an internal identifier used by Wikimedia Philippines to identify the monument. This is not an official identifier, and only shown temporarily in the templates until the government creates an updated complete list.)	Site name	Description	Province	City or municipality	Address	Coordinates	Image
	Don Claro Caluya Monument		Ilocos Norte	Piddig	Estella Street	18°09′58″N 120°42′56″E	Upload file
	Rizal Monument		Ilocos Norte	Piddig	Piddig Municipal Grounds, Estella Street	18°09′59″N 120°42′54″E	Upload file
	Raquiza House		Ilocos Norte	Piddig	Barangay Cabaroan	18°10′01″N 120°42′55″E	Upload Photo
	Teodoro Pacairo House		Ilocos Norte	Piddig	#004 Barangay Cabaroan	18°10′00″N 120°42′56″E	Upload Photo
	Santa Ana Church		Ilocos Norte	Piddig	Poblacion	18°09′58″N 120°43′00″E	Upload file
	Bell tower of Santa Ana Church		Ilocos Norte	Piddig	Poblacion	18°09′58″N 120°42′59″E	Upload file
	Saint Anne Academy		Ilocos Norte	Piddig	Poblacion	18°09′57″N 120°43′01″E	Upload file
	Basi Revolt Monument		Ilocos Norte	Piddig	Poblacion	18°09′50″N 120°42′52″E	Upload file

== Education ==
The Piddig Schools District Office governs all public and private elementary schools and high schools within the municipality.

Almost each barrio or barangay in Piddig has its own elementary school. The town's poblacion Anao, historically had one that was found in 1912, Piddig Elementary School. In the late 1970s, the school split into two, Piddig (North) Central and Piddig South Central because the school couldn't accommodate the large number of students.

Another example is Ab-abut Elementary School - whose original name was Ab-abut-Sucsuquen Elementary School but was later shortened because the whole name could not be accommodated in the gate that was installed.

There are four (4) high schools in Piddig: Piddig National High School, Roosevelt High School, St. Anne Academy (Catholic) and Estancia Integrated School. However, many students attend high schools in nearby Laoag City.

=== Primary and elementary schools ===
- Ab-Abut Elementary School
- Abucay Elementary School
- Boyboy Elementary School
- Calambeg Elementary School
- Carasi Elementary School (Carasi)
- Dupitac Elementary School
- Gayamat Elementary School
- Lagandit Elementary School
- Libnaoan Elementary School
- Maab-abaca Elementary School
- Maruaya Elementary School
- Piddig Central Elementary School
- Piddig South Central Elementary School
- San Antonio Elementary School
- Sta.Maria Elementary School
- Tangaoan Elementary School
- Tonoton Elementary School
- Virbira-Angset Elementary School (Carasi)

=== Secondary schools ===
- Carasi National High School (Merged because of Piddig-Carasi district)
- Piddig National High School
- Roosevelt High School of Piddig
- Saint Anne Academy
- Estancia Integrated School

== Notable personalities ==
- Teófilo Yldefonso, a Filipino swimmer
- Claro Caluya, an Ilocano poet and writer
