= Simeon Toribio =

Filipino athlete and politician (1905–1969)

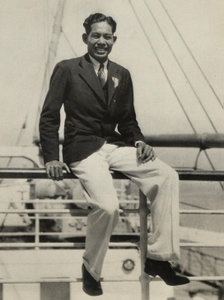
- Simeon Toribio in 1932

Member of the House of Representatives of the Philippines from Bohol's 2nd district
- In office May 25, 1946 – December 30, 1953
- Preceded by: Olegario Clarin
- Succeeded by: Bartolome Cabangbang

Personal details
- Born: September 3, 1905 Zamboanga, Moro Province, Philippine Islands
- Died: June 5, 1969 (aged 63) Carmen, Bohol, Philippines
- Party: Liberal (1946–1969)
- Sports career
- Nationality: Filipino
- Country: Philippines
- Sport: Track and field
- Event: High jump
- College team: Mapúa Cardinals
- Club: Silliman University

Sports achievements and titles
- Personal best: 2.00 m (1930)
Medal record
Representing Philippines
Olympic Games
Bronze medal – third place	1932 Los Angeles	High jump
Far Eastern Championship Games
Gold medal – first place	1927 Shanghai	High jump
Gold medal – first place	1930 Tokyo	High jump
Gold medal – first place	1934 Manila	High jump

Simeon Galvez Toribio (September 3, 1905 – June 5, 1969) was a Filipino high jumper and politician.

== Early life and education ==
Toribio studied at Silliman University.

== Athletics career ==
He competed at the 1928, 1932 and 1936 Olympics and won a bronze medal in 1932. In 1928, he cleared the same height as the silver and bronze medalists Benjamin Hedges and Claude Ménard, but lost the jump-off and placed fourth. Toribio served as the flag bearer for the Philippines at the 1936 Games, where he finished 12th.

According to author Jorge Afable, Toribio could have won the gold medal, if not only for the "call of nature". It was a grueling four-hour competition to jump over the bar raised at six feet and six inches high. Toribio, who once made the jump, failed to overcome it the second time because he was distressed by call of nature.

== Recognition ==
Toribio was the recipient of the 1930 Helms World Trophy for being Asia's greatest athlete, the only Filipino to be awarded this honor.

Also in 1930, he was awarded the title "Asia’s Greatest Athlete".

== Post-athletics career ==
During World War II, Toribio joined the underground resistance and narrowly escaped arrest by Japanese forces due to a chance encounter involving a souvenir from a previous competition in Japan.

Toribio later became a civil engineer.

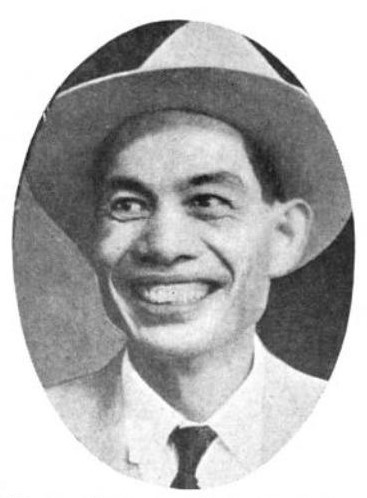
Toribio official portrait during the 2nd Congress.

In 1941, he was elected to the House of Representatives of the Philippines, representing the Second District of Bohol, and served until 1953.

== Later life and death ==
He settled in Carmen, Bohol and died there in 1969. His descendants are continuing his legacy in Public Service.

Preceded by Olegario B. Clarin	Representative, 2nd District of Bohol; 1941–1953	Succeeded by Bartolome C. Cabangbang
