= Antonios Karyofyllis =

Greek high jumper

Personal information
- Nationality: Greek
- Born: 1904
- Died: 1989 (aged 84–85)

Sport
- Sport: Athletics
- Event: High jump

Antonios Karyofyllis (1904 – 1989) was a Greek athlete. He competed in the men's high jump at the 1924 Summer Olympics and the 1928 Summer Olympics.
