= Saburo Nagao =

Japanese javelin thrower

Personal information
- Nationality: Japanese
- Born: 25 August 1910 Osaka, Japan
- Died: 13 December 1943 (aged 33) New Guinea

Sport
- Sport: Athletics
- Event: Javelin throw

Saburo Nagao (25 August 1910 – 13 December 1943) was a Japanese track and field athlete. He competed in the men's javelin throw at the 1932 Summer Olympics. He was killed during World War II.
