= Yonetaro Nakazawa =

Japanese athletics competitor

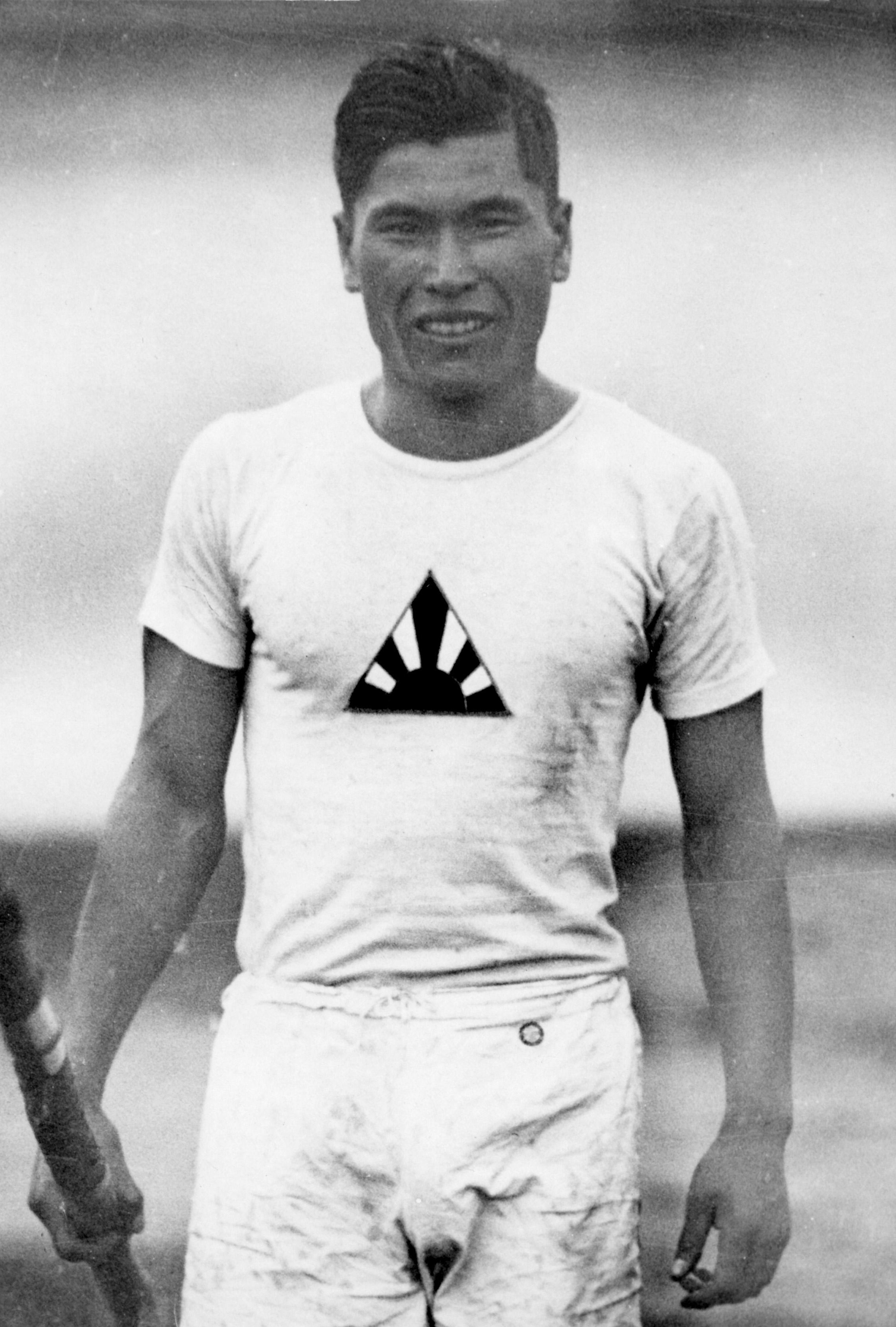
- Yonetaro Nakazawa at the 1928 Olympics

Personal information
- Born: September 26, 1903
- Died: February 5, 1984 (aged 80)

Sport
- Sport: Decathlon, pole vaulting

Yonetaro Nakazawa (中沢 米太郎, Nakazawa Yonetarō; September 26, 1903 – February 5, 1984) was a Japanese track and field athlete. He competed at the 1928 Summer Olympics in the pole vault and decathlon and finished in sixth and 22nd place, respectively. He was the flag bearer for Japan at those Olympics.

He also competed for Japan at the Far Eastern Championship Games (a forerunner to the Asian Games) and was the winner of the pole vault competition in 1923 in Osaka and again in 1927.
