= Yoshio Miki =

Japanese hurdler

Personal information
- Nationality: Japanese
- Born: 6 June 1905

Sport
- Sport: Track and field
- Event: 110 metres hurdles

Yoshio Miki (三木 義雄, Miki Yoshio; born 6 June 1905, date of death unknown) was a Japanese hurdler. He competed in the men's 110 metres hurdles at the 1928 Summer Olympics.
