= 1930 Far Eastern Championship Games =

Regional multi-sport event

9th Far Eastern Championship Games 第9回極東選手権競技大会
- Host city: Tokyo, Japan
- Nations: 4
- Opening: 24 May 1930
- Closing: 27 May 1930
- Opened by: Hirohito; Emperor of Japan

The 1930 Far Eastern Championship Games was the ninth edition of the regional multi-sport event and was held from 24 to 27 May 1930 in Tokyo, Empire of Japan. A total of eight sports were contested over the course of the five-day event.

India made its first and only appearance in the tournament's history, becoming the first participant outside of the traditional three nations since the inaugural 1913 Games.

The Chinese won their eighth consecutive title in the football competition. China was represented in the baseball competition by the Chinese Honolulu team – a group of expatriates based in Hawaii. The games was held one month after the 1930 Chinese National Games. The Chinese performed very poorly at the 1930 Far Eastern Championship Games, managing only one bronze medal in the athletics programme. This fostered anti-Japanese sentiment among the Chinese, many of whom saw the performance at this edition as a national embarrassment, particularly given the comparative size of Japan compared to China.

== Participants ==
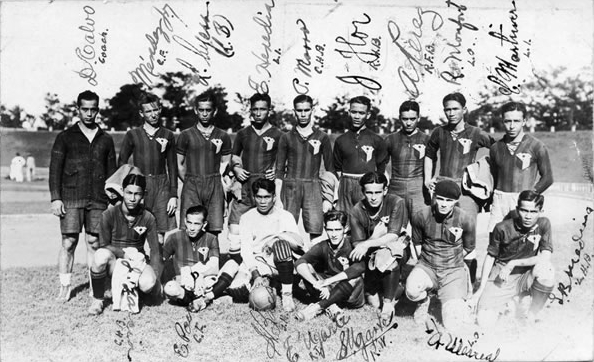
Philippines 1930 Far Eastern Games squad

- Republic of China
- British India
- Japanese Empire
- Philippine Islands

== Sports ==
- Athletics
- Baseball
- Basketball
- Diving
- Football
- Swimming
- Tennis
- Volleyball
