= 1927 Far Eastern Championship Games =

Regional multi-sport event held in Shanghai

8th Far Eastern Championship Games
- Host city: Shanghai, China
- Nations: 3
- Opening: 28 August 1927
- Closing: 31 August 1927

The 1927 Far Eastern Championship Games was the eighth edition of the regional multi-sport event, contested between China, Japan and the Philippines, and was held from 28–31 August 1927 in Shanghai, Republic of China. A total of eight sports were contested during the four-day competition. This was the last time the competition was held on a biennial schedule and the event subsequently changed to a quadrennial basis, being held in the even years between Olympic competitions.

Women athletes appeared at the games. A demonstration volleyball match was held by an Eastern Chinese women's team. However, their appearance generated a negative reaction from some audience members, who began insulting and shouting at the women. The match was curtailed before the allotted time as a result.

The football match between China and the Philippines caused further disruption as the two teams began brawling and the audience threw objects onto the pitch – some leaving the stands to join the melee. This soured relations among the delegations and at the post-games banquet, in response to loud antics of Filipino attendees, the Chinese head organiser, Shen Siliang, openly stated that Chinese and Japanese women should avoid the Filipino delegation.

In the football competition, China was represented by South China AA, a Hong Kong–based team.

== Participating nations ==
- Republic of China
- Japanese Empire
- Philippine Islands

== Sports ==
- Athletics
- Baseball
- Basketball
- Diving
- Football
- Swimming
- Tennis
- Volleyball
