= List of Olympic medalists in swimming (men) =

This is the complete list of men's Olympic medalists in swimming.

== Men's events ==
| OR | indicates swimmer broke the Olympic Record |
| WR | indicates swimmer broke the World Record (and Olympic Record) |
| AM | indicates swimmer broke the American Record |
| SA | indicates swimmer broke the South American Record |
| ER | indicates swimmer broke the European Record |
| AS | indicates swimmer broke the Asian Record |
| NR | indicates swimmer broke the National Record |

=== 50 metre freestyle ===
| Games | Gold | | Silver | | Bronze | |
|---|---|---|---|---|---|---|
| 1988 Seoul | Matt Biondi; United States | 22.14; WR | Tom Jager; United States | 22.36 | Gennadiy Prigoda; Soviet Union | 22.71 |
| 1992 Barcelona | Alexander Popov; Unified Team | 21.91; OR | Matt Biondi; United States | 22.09 | Tom Jager; United States | 22.30 |
| 1996 Atlanta | Alexander Popov; Russia | 22.13 | Gary Hall Jr. United States | 22.26 | Fernando Scherer; Brazil | 22.29; SA |
| 2000 Sydney | Anthony Ervin; United States; Gary Hall Jr. United States | 21.98 | Not awarded as there was a tie for gold. | | Pieter van den Hoogenband; Netherlands | 22.03 |
| 2004 Athens | Gary Hall Jr. United States | 21.93 | Duje Draganja; Croatia | 21.94 | Roland Mark Schoeman; South Africa | 22.02 |
| 2008 Beijing | César Cielo; Brazil | 21.30; OR AM | Amaury Leveaux; France | 21.45 | Alain Bernard; France | 21.49 |
| 2012 London | Florent Manaudou; France | 21.34 | Cullen Jones; United States | 21.54 | César Cielo; Brazil | 21.59 |
| 2016 Rio de Janeiro | Anthony Ervin; United States | 21.40 | Florent Manaudou; France | 21.41 | Nathan Adrian; United States | 21.49 |
| 2020 Tokyo | Caeleb Dressel; United States | 21.07; OR | Florent Manaudou; France | 21.55 | Bruno Fratus; Brazil | 21.57 |
| 2024 Paris | Cameron McEvoy; Australia | 21.25 | Benjamin Proud; Great Britain | 21.30 | Florent Manaudou; France | 21.56 |
| 2028 Los Angeles | | | | | | |

=== 100 metre freestyle ===
| Games | Gold | | Silver | | Bronze | |
|---|---|---|---|---|---|---|
| 1896 Athens | Alfréd Hajós; Hungary | 1:22.2; OR | Otto Herschmann; Austria | 1:22.8 | none awarded | |
| 1900–1904 | not included in the Olympic program | | | | | |
| 1908 London | Charles Daniels; United States | 1:05.6; WR | Zoltán Halmay; Hungary | 1:06.2 | Harald Julin; Sweden | 1:08.0 |
| 1912 Stockholm | Duke Kahanamoku; United States | 1:03.4 set WR in semifinal | Cecil Healy; Australasia | 1:04.6 | Ken Huszagh; United States | 1:05.6 |
| 1920 Antwerp | Duke Kahanamoku; United States | 1:01.4 set WR in the final before it was re-run due to protest | Pua Kealoha; United States | 1:02.6 | Bill Harris; United States | 1:03.0 |
| 1924 Paris | Johnny Weissmuller; United States | 59.0; OR | Duke Kahanamoku; United States | 1:01.4 | Samuel Kahanamoku; United States | 1:01.8 |
| 1928 Amsterdam | Johnny Weissmuller; United States | 58.6; OR | István Bárány; Hungary | 59.8 | Katsuo Takaishi; Japan | 1:00.0 |
| 1932 Los Angeles | Yasuji Miyazaki; Japan | 58.2 set OR in semifinal | Tatsugo Kawaishi; Japan | 58.6 | Albert Schwartz; United States | 58.8 |
| 1936 Berlin | Ferenc Csik; Hungary | 57.6 | Masanori Yusa; Japan | 57.9 tied OR in semifinal | Shigeo Arai; Japan | 58.0 |
| 1948 London | Wally Ris; United States | 57.3; OR | Alan Ford; United States | 57.8 | Géza Kádas; Hungary | 58.1 |
| 1952 Helsinki | Clarke Scholes; United States | 57.4 | Hiroshi Suzuki; Japan | 57.4 | Göran Larsson; Sweden | 58.2 |
| 1956 Melbourne | Jon Henricks; Australia | 55.4; WR | John Devitt; Australia | 55.8 | Gary Chapman; Australia | 56.7 |
| 1960 Rome | John Devitt; Australia | 55.2; OR | Lance Larson; United States | 55.2; OR | Manuel dos Santos; Brazil | 55.4 |
| 1964 Tokyo | Don Schollander; United States | 53.4; OR | Robert McGregor; Great Britain | 53.5 | Hans-Joachim Klein; United Team of Germany | 54.0 |
| 1968 Mexico City | Michael Wenden; Australia | 52.2; WR | Ken Walsh; United States | 52.8 | Mark Spitz; United States | 53.0 |
| 1972 Munich | Mark Spitz; United States | 51.22; WR | Jerry Heidenreich; United States | 51.65 | Vladimir Bure; Soviet Union | 51.77 |
| 1976 Montreal | Jim Montgomery; United States | 49.9; WR | Jack Babashoff; United States | 50.81 | Peter Nocke; West Germany | 51.31 |
| 1980 Moscow | Jörg Woithe; East Germany | 50.40 | Per Holmertz; Sweden | 50.91 | Per Johansson; Sweden | 51.29 |
| 1984 Los Angeles | Rowdy Gaines; United States | 49.80; OR | Mark Stockwell; Australia | 50.24 | Per Johansson; Sweden | 50.31 |
| 1988 Seoul | Matt Biondi; United States | 48.63; OR | Chris Jacobs; United States | 49.08 | Stéphan Caron; France | 49.62 |
| 1992 Barcelona | Alexander Popov; Unified Team | 49.02 | Gustavo Borges; Brazil | 49.43 | Stéphan Caron; France | 49.50 |
| 1996 Atlanta | Alexander Popov; Russia | 48.74 | Gary Hall Jr. United States | 48.81 | Gustavo Borges; Brazil | 49.02 |
| 2000 Sydney | Pieter van den Hoogenband; Netherlands | 48.30 set WR in semifinal | Alexander Popov; Russia | 48.69 | Gary Hall Jr. United States | 48.73 |
| 2004 Athens | Pieter van den Hoogenband; Netherlands | 48.17 | Roland Mark Schoeman; South Africa | 48.23 | Ian Thorpe; Australia | 48.56 |
| 2008 Beijing | Alain Bernard; France | 47.21 | Eamon Sullivan; Australia | 47.32 set WR in semifinal | Jason Lezak; United States; César Cielo; Brazil | 47.67 |
| 2012 London | Nathan Adrian; United States | 47.52 | James Magnussen; Australia | 47.53 | Brent Hayden; Canada | 47.80 |
| 2016 Rio de Janeiro | Kyle Chalmers; Australia | 47.58 | Pieter Timmers; Belgium | 47.80 | Nathan Adrian; United States | 47.85 |
| 2020 Tokyo | Caeleb Dressel; United States | 47.02; OR | Kyle Chalmers; Australia | 47.08 | Kliment Kolesnikov; ROC | 47.44 |
| 2024 Paris | Pan Zhanle; China | 46.40; WR | Kyle Chalmers; Australia | 47.48 | David Popovici; Romania | 47.49 |
| 2028 Los Angeles | | | | | | |

=== 200 metre freestyle ===
| Games | Gold | | Silver | | Bronze | |
|---|---|---|---|---|---|---|
| 1900 Paris | Frederick Lane (AUS); Great Britain (Note: As Australian Frederick Lane (AUS) represented a British swim club in 1900, his participation and medals at the 1900 Summer Olympics are attributed to Great Britain. (Note: In 2024, the International Olympic Committee (IOC) reinstated its original and current attribution policy for athletes at the early Olympic Games (1896–1904). Participation and medals have been attributed according to the national affiliation of the club or team represented by the athlete, rather than their nationality.)) | 2:25.2 | Zoltán Halmay; Hungary | 2:31.4 | Karl Ruberl; Austria | 2:32.0 set OR in semifinal |
| 1904–1964 | not included in the Olympic program | | | | | |
| 1968 Mexico City | Michael Wenden; Australia | 1:55.2; OR | Don Schollander; United States | 1:55.8 | John Nelson; United States | 1:58.1 |
| 1972 Munich | Mark Spitz; United States | 1:52.78 WR | Steve Genter; United States | 1:53.73 | Werner Lampe; West Germany | 1:53.99 |
| 1976 Montreal | Bruce Furniss; United States | 1:50.29 WR | John Naber; United States | 1:50.50 | Jim Montgomery; United States | 1:50.58 |
| 1980 Moscow | Sergey Koplyakov; Soviet Union | 1:49.81 OR | Andrey Krylov; Soviet Union | 1:50.76 | Graeme Brewer; Australia | 1:51.60 |
| 1984 Los Angeles | Michael Gross; West Germany | 1:47.44 WR | Mike Heath; United States | 1:49.10 | Thomas Fahrner; West Germany | 1:49.69 |
| 1988 Seoul | Duncan Armstrong; Australia | 1:47.25 WR | Anders Holmertz; Sweden | 1:47.89 | Matt Biondi; United States | 1:47.99 |
| 1992 Barcelona | Yevgeny Sadovyi; Unified Team | 1:46.70 OR | Anders Holmertz; Sweden | 1:46.86 | Antti Kasvio; Finland | 1:47.63 |
| 1996 Atlanta | Danyon Loader; New Zealand | 1:47.63 | Gustavo Borges; Brazil | 1:48.08 | Daniel Kowalski; Australia | 1:48.25 |
| 2000 Sydney | Pieter van den Hoogenband; Netherlands | 1:45.35 WR | Ian Thorpe; Australia | 1:45.83 | Massimiliano Rosolino; Italy | 1:46.65 |
| 2004 Athens | Ian Thorpe; Australia | 1:44.71 OR | Pieter van den Hoogenband; Netherlands | 1:45.23 | Michael Phelps; United States | 1:45.32 |
| 2008 Beijing | Michael Phelps; United States | 1:42.96 WR | Park Tae-hwan; South Korea | 1:44.85 | Peter Vanderkaay; United States | 1:45.14 |
| 2012 London | Yannick Agnel; France | 1:43.14 | Park Tae-hwan; South Korea; Sun Yang; China | 1:44.93 | none awarded | |
| 2016 Rio de Janeiro | Sun Yang; China | 1:44.65 | Chad le Clos; South Africa | 1:45.20 | Conor Dwyer; United States | 1:45.23 |
| 2020 Tokyo | Tom Dean; Great Britain | 1:44.22 | Duncan Scott; Great Britain | 1:44.26 | Fernando Scheffer; Brazil | 1:44.66 |
| 2024 Paris | David Popovici; Romania | 1:44.72 | Matthew Richards; Great Britain | 1:44.74 | Luke Hobson; United States | 1:44.79 |
| 2028 Los Angeles | | | | | | |

=== 400 metre freestyle ===
| Games | Gold | | Silver | | Bronze | |
|---|---|---|---|---|---|---|
| 1908 London | Henry Taylor; Great Britain | 5:36.8; WR | Frank Beaurepaire; Australasia | 5:44.2 | Otto Scheff; Austria | 5:46.0 |
| 1912 Stockholm | George Hodgson; Canada | 5:24.4; WR | Jack Hatfield; Great Britain | 5:35.8 | Harold Hardwick; Australasia | 5:31.2 |
| 1920 Antwerp | Norman Ross; United States | 5:26.8 | Ludy Langer; United States | 5:29.0 | George Vernot; Canada | 5:29.6 |
| 1924 Paris | Johnny Weissmuller; United States | 5:04.2; OR | Arne Borg; Sweden | 5:05.6 | Andrew Charlton; Australia | 5:06.6 |
| 1928 Amsterdam | Alberto Zorrilla; Argentina | 5:01.6; OR | Andrew Charlton; Australia | 5:03.6 | Arne Borg; Sweden | 5:04.6 |
| 1932 Los Angeles | Buster Crabbe; United States | 4:48.4; OR | Jean Taris; France | 4:48.5 | Tsutomu Ōyokota; Japan | 4:52.3 |
| 1936 Berlin | Jack Medica; United States | 4:45.5; OR | Shunpei Uto; Japan | 4:45.6 | Shozo Makino; Japan | 4:48.1 |
| 1948 London | Bill Smith; United States | 4:41.0; OR | Jimmy McLane; United States | 4:43.4 | John Marshall; Australia | 4:47.4 |
| 1952 Helsinki | Jean Boiteux; France | 4:30.7; OR | Ford Konno; United States | 4:31.3 | Per-Olof Östrand; Sweden | 4:35.2 |
| 1956 Melbourne | Murray Rose; Australia | 4:27.3; OR | Tsuyoshi Yamanaka; Japan | 4:30.4 | George Breen; United States | 4:32.5 |
| 1960 Rome | Murray Rose; Australia | 4:18.3; OR | Tsuyoshi Yamanaka; Japan | 4:21.4 | John Konrads; Australia | 4:21.8 |
| 1964 Tokyo | Don Schollander; United States | 4:12.2; WR | Frank Wiegand; United Team of Germany | 4:14.9 | Allan Wood; Australia | 4:15.1 |
| 1968 Mexico City | Mike Burton; United States | 4:09.0; OR | Ralph Hutton; Canada | 4:11.7 | Alain Mosconi; France | 4:13.3 |
| 1972 Munich | Brad Cooper; Australia | 4:00.27; OR | Steve Genter; United States | 4:01.94 | Tom McBreen; United States | 4:02.64 |
| 1976 Montreal | Brian Goodell; United States | 3:51.93; WR | Tim Shaw; United States | 3:52.54 | Vladimir Raskatov; Soviet Union | 3:55.76 |
| 1980 Moscow | Vladimir Salnikov; Soviet Union | 3:51.31; OR | Andrey Krylov; Soviet Union | 3:53.24 | Ivar Stukolkin; Soviet Union | 3:53.95 |
| 1984 Los Angeles | George DiCarlo; United States | 3:51.23 | John Mykkanen; United States | 3:51.49 | Justin Lemberg; Australia | 3:51.79 |
| 1988 Seoul | Uwe Dassler; East Germany | 3:46.95; WR | Duncan Armstrong; Australia | 3:47.15 | Artur Wojdat; Poland | 3:47.34 |
| 1992 Barcelona | Yevgeny Sadovyi; Unified Team | 3:45.00; WR | Kieren Perkins; Australia | 3:45.16 | Anders Holmertz; Sweden | 3:46.77 |
| 1996 Atlanta | Danyon Loader; New Zealand | 3:47.97 | Paul Palmer; Great Britain | 3:49.00 | Daniel Kowalski; Australia | 3:49.39 |
| 2000 Sydney | Ian Thorpe; Australia | 3:40.59; WR | Massimiliano Rosolino; Italy | 3:43.40 | Klete Keller; United States | 3:47.00 |
| 2004 Athens | Ian Thorpe; Australia | 3:43.10 | Grant Hackett; Australia | 3:43.36 | Klete Keller; United States | 3:44.11 |
| 2008 Beijing | Park Tae-hwan; South Korea | 3:41.86 | Zhang Lin; China | 3:42.44 | Larsen Jensen; United States | 3:42.78 |
| 2012 London | Sun Yang; China | 3:40.14; OR | Park Tae-hwan; South Korea | 3:42.06 | Peter Vanderkaay; United States | 3:44.69 |
| 2016 Rio de Janeiro | Mack Horton; Australia | 3:41.55 | Sun Yang; China | 3:41.68 | Gabriele Detti; Italy | 3:43.49 |
| 2020 Tokyo | Ahmed Hafnaoui; Tunisia | 3:43.36 | Jack McLoughlin; Australia | 3:43.52 | Kieran Smith; United States | 3:43.94 |
| 2024 Paris | Lukas Märtens; Germany | 3:41.78 | Elijah Winnington; Australia | 3:42.21 | Kim Woo-min; South Korea | 3:42.50 |
| 2028 Los Angeles | | | | | | |

=== 800 metre freestyle ===
| Games | Gold | | Silver | | Bronze | |
|---|---|---|---|---|---|---|
| 2020 Tokyo | Bobby Finke; United States | 7:41.87 | Gregorio Paltrinieri; Italy | 7:42.11 | Mykhailo Romanchuk; Ukraine | 7:42.33 set OR in heats |
| 2024 Paris | Daniel Wiffen; Ireland | 7:38.19; OR | Bobby Finke; United States | 7:38.75 | Gregorio Paltrinieri; Italy | 7:39.38 |
| 2028 Los Angeles | | | | | | |

=== 1500 metre freestyle ===
| Games | Gold | | Silver | | Bronze | |
|---|---|---|---|---|---|---|
| 1908 London | Henry Taylor; Great Britain | 22:48.4; WR | Thomas Battersby; Great Britain | 22:51.2 | Frank Beaurepaire; Australasia | 22:56.2 |
| 1912 Stockholm | George Hodgson; Canada | 22:00.0; WR | Jack Hatfield; Great Britain | 22:39.0 | Harold Hardwick; Australasia | 23:15.4 |
| 1920 Antwerp | Norman Ross; United States | 22:23.2 | George Vernot; Canada | 22:36.4 | Frank Beaurepaire; Australia | 23:04.0 |
| 1924 Paris | Andrew Charlton; Australia | 20:06.0; WR | Arne Borg; Sweden | 20:41.4 | Frank Beaurepaire; Australia | 21:48.4 |
| 1928 Amsterdam | Arne Borg; Sweden | 19:51.8; OR | Andrew Charlton; Australia | 20:02.6 | Buster Crabbe; United States | 20:28.8 |
| 1932 Los Angeles | Kusuo Kitamura; Japan | 19:12.4; OR | Shozo Makino; Japan | 19:14.1 | Jim Cristy; United States | 19:39.5 |
| 1936 Berlin | Noboru Terada; Japan | 19:13.7 | Jack Medica; United States | 19:34.0 | Shunpei Uto; Japan | 19:34.5 |
| 1948 London | Jimmy McLane; United States | 19:18.5 | John Marshall; Australia | 19:31.3 | György Mitró; Hungary | 19:43.2 |
| 1952 Helsinki | Ford Konno; United States | 18:30.3; OR | Shiro Hashizume; Japan | 18:41.4 | Tetsuo Okamoto; Brazil | 18:51.3 |
| 1956 Melbourne | Murray Rose; Australia | 17:58.9 | Tsuyoshi Yamanaka; Japan | 18:00.3 | George Breen; United States | 18:08.2 set WR in semifinal |
| 1960 Rome | John Konrads; Australia | 17:19.6; OR | Murray Rose; Australia | 17:21.7 | George Breen; United States | 17:30.6 |
| 1964 Tokyo | Bob Windle; Australia | 17:01.7; OR | John Nelson; United States | 17:03.0 | Allan Wood; Australia | 17:07.7 |
| 1968 Mexico City | Mike Burton; United States | 16:38.9; OR | John Kinsella; United States | 16:57.3 | Greg Brough; Australia | 17:04.7 |
| 1972 Munich | Mike Burton; United States | 15:52.58; WR | Graham Windeatt; Australia | 15:58.48 | Doug Northway; United States | 16:09.25 |
| 1976 Montreal | Brian Goodell; United States | 15:02.40; WR | Bobby Hackett; United States | 15:03.91 | Stephen Holland; Australia | 15:04.66 |
| 1980 Moscow | Vladimir Salnikov; Soviet Union | 14:58.27; WR | Aleksandr Chayev; Soviet Union | 15:14.30 | Max Metzker; Australia | 15:14.49 |
| 1984 Los Angeles | Mike O'Brien; United States | 15:05.20 | George DiCarlo; United States | 15:10.59 | Stefan Pfeiffer; West Germany | 15:12.77 |
| 1988 Seoul | Vladimir Salnikov; Soviet Union | 15:00.40 | Stefan Pfeiffer; West Germany | 15:02.69 | Uwe Dassler; East Germany | 15:06.15 |
| 1992 Barcelona | Kieren Perkins; Australia | 14:43.48; WR | Glen Housman; Australia | 14:55.29 | Jörg Hoffmann; Germany | 15:02.29 |
| 1996 Atlanta | Kieren Perkins; Australia | 14:56.40 | Daniel Kowalski; Australia | 15:02.43 | Graeme Smith; Great Britain | 15:02.48 |
| 2000 Sydney | Grant Hackett; Australia | 14:48.33 | Kieren Perkins; Australia | 14:53.59 | Chris Thompson; United States | 14:56.81 |
| 2004 Athens | Grant Hackett; Australia | 14:43.40; OR | Larsen Jensen; United States | 14:45.29 | David Davies; Great Britain | 14:45.95 |
| 2008 Beijing | Oussama Mellouli; Tunisia | 14:40.84 | Grant Hackett; Australia | 14:41.53 set OR in heats | Ryan Cochrane; Canada | 14:42.69 |
| 2012 London | Sun Yang; China | 14:31.02; WR | Ryan Cochrane; Canada | 14:39.63 | Oussama Mellouli; Tunisia | 14:40.31 |
| 2016 Rio de Janeiro | Gregorio Paltrinieri; Italy | 14:34.57 | Connor Jaeger; United States | 14:39.48 | Gabriele Detti; Italy | 14:40.86 |
| 2020 Tokyo | Bobby Finke; United States | 14:39.65 | Mykhailo Romanchuk; Ukraine | 14:40.66 | Florian Wellbrock; Germany | 14:40.91 |
| 2024 Paris | Bobby Finke; United States | 14:30.67; WR | Gregorio Paltrinieri; Italy | 14:34.55 | Daniel Wiffen; Ireland | 14:39.63 |
| 2028 Los Angeles | | | | | | |

=== 50 metre backstroke ===
| Games | Gold | Silver | Bronze |
|---|---|---|---|
| 2028 Los Angeles | | | |

=== 100 metre backstroke ===
| Games | Gold | | Silver | | Bronze | |
|---|---|---|---|---|---|---|
| 1908 London | Arno Bieberstein; Germany | 1:24.6; WR | Ludvig Dam; Denmark | 1:26.6 | Herbert Haresnape; Great Britain | 1:27.0 |
| 1912 Stockholm | Harry Hebner; United States | 1:21.2 set OR in semifinal | Otto Fahr; Germany | 1:22.4 | Paul Kellner; Germany | 1:24.0 |
| 1920 Antwerp | Warren Kealoha; United States | 1:15.2 set WR in semifinal | Ray Kegeris; United States | 1:16.8 | Gérard Blitz; Belgium | 1:19.0 |
| 1924 Paris | Warren Kealoha; United States | 1:13.2; OR | Paul Wyatt; United States | 1:15.4 | Károly Bartha; Hungary | 1:17.8 |
| 1928 Amsterdam | George Kojac; United States | 1:08.2; WR | Walter Laufer; United States | 1:10.0 | Paul Wyatt; United States | 1:12.0 |
| 1932 Los Angeles | Masaji Kiyokawa; Japan | 1:08.6 | Toshio Irie; Japan | 1:09.8 | Kentaro Kawatsu; Japan | 1:10.0 |
| 1936 Berlin | Adolph Kiefer; United States | 1:05.9; OR | Al Vande Weghe; United States | 1:07.7 | Masaji Kiyokawa; Japan | 1:08.4 |
| 1948 London | Allen Stack; United States | 1:06.4 | Bob Cowell; United States | 1:06.5 | Georges Vallerey Jr. France | 1:07.8 |
| 1952 Helsinki | Yoshi Oyakawa; United States | 1:05.4; OR | Gilbert Bozon; France | 1:06.2 | Jack Taylor; United States | 1:06.4 |
| 1956 Melbourne | David Theile; Australia | 1:02.2; WR | Jon Monckton; Australia | 1:03.2 | Frank McKinney; United States | 1:04.5 |
| 1960 Rome | David Theile; Australia | 1:01.9; OR | Frank McKinney; United States | 1:02.1 | Bob Bennett; United States | 1:02.3 |
| 1964 Tokyo | not included in the Olympic program | | | | | |
| 1968 Mexico City | Roland Matthes; East Germany | 58.7; OR | Charlie Hickcox; United States | 1:00.2 | Ronnie Mills; United States | 1:00.5 |
| 1972 Munich | Roland Matthes; East Germany | 56.58; OR | Mike Stamm; United States | 57.70 | John Murphy; United States | 58.35 |
| 1976 Montreal | John Naber; United States | 55.49; WR | Peter Rocca; United States | 56.34 | Roland Matthes; East Germany | 57.22 |
| 1980 Moscow | Bengt Baron; Sweden | 56.53 | Viktor Kuznetsov; Soviet Union | 56.99 | Vladimir Dolgov; Soviet Union | 57.63 |
| 1984 Los Angeles | Rick Carey; United States | 55.79 | Dave Wilson; United States | 56.35 | Mike West; Canada | 56.49 |
| 1988 Seoul | Daichi Suzuki; Japan | 55.05 | David Berkoff; United States | 55.18 set WR in heats | Igor Polyansky; Soviet Union | 55.20 |
| 1992 Barcelona | Mark Tewksbury; Canada | 53.98; OR | Jeff Rouse; United States | 54.04 | David Berkoff; United States | 54.78 |
| 1996 Atlanta | Jeff Rouse; United States | 54.10 | Rodolfo Falcón; Cuba | 54.98 | Neisser Bent; Cuba | 55.02 |
| 2000 Sydney | Lenny Krayzelburg; United States | 53.72; OR | Matt Welsh; Australia | 54.07 | Stev Theloke; Germany | 54.82 |
| 2004 Athens | Aaron Peirsol; United States | 54.06 | Markus Rogan; Austria | 54.35 | Tomomi Morita; Japan | 54.36 |
| 2008 Beijing | Aaron Peirsol; United States | 52.54; WR | Matt Grevers; United States | 53.11 | Arkady Vyatchanin; Russia; Hayden Stoeckel; Australia | 53.18 |
| 2012 London | Matt Grevers; United States | 52.16; OR | Nick Thoman; United States | 52.92 | Ryosuke Irie; Japan | 52.97 |
| 2016 Rio de Janeiro | Ryan Murphy; United States | 51.97; OR | Xu Jiayu; China | 52.31 | David Plummer; United States | 52.40 |
| 2020 Tokyo | Evgeny Rylov; ROC | 51.98 | Kliment Kolesnikov; ROC | 52.00 | Ryan Murphy; United States | 52.19 |
| 2024 Paris | Thomas Ceccon; Italy | 52.00 | Xu Jiayu; China | 52.32 | Ryan Murphy; United States | 52.39 |
| 2028 Los Angeles | | | | | | |

=== 200 metre backstroke ===
| Games | Gold | | Silver | | Bronze | |
|---|---|---|---|---|---|---|
| 1900 Paris | Ernst Hoppenberg; Germany | 2:47.0; OR | Karl Ruberl; Austria | 2:56.0 | Johannes Drost; Netherlands | 3:01.0 |
| 1904–1960 | not included in the Olympic program | | | | | |
| 1964 Tokyo | Jed Graef; United States | 2:10.3; WR | Gary Dilley; United States | 2:10.5 | Bob Bennett; United States | 2:13.1 |
| 1968 Mexico City | Roland Matthes; East Germany | 2:09.6; OR | Mitch Ivey; United States | 2:10.6 | Jack Horsley; United States | 2:10.9 |
| 1972 Munich | Roland Matthes; East Germany | 2:02.82; WR | Mike Stamm; United States | 2:04.09 | Mitch Ivey; United States | 2:04.33 |
| 1976 Montreal | John Naber; United States | 1:59.19; WR | Peter Rocca; United States | 2:00.55 | Dan Harrigan; United States | 2:01.35 |
| 1980 Moscow | Sándor Wladár; Hungary | 2:01.93 | Zoltán Verrasztó; Hungary | 2:02.40 | Mark Kerry; Australia | 2:03.14 |
| 1984 Los Angeles | Rick Carey; United States | 2:00.23 set OR in heats | Frédéric Delcourt; France | 2:01.75 | Cameron Henning; Canada | 2:02.37 |
| 1988 Seoul | Igor Polyansky; Soviet Union | 1:59.37 | Frank Baltrusch; East Germany | 1:59.60 | Paul Kingsman; New Zealand | 2:00.48 |
| 1992 Barcelona | Martín López-Zubero; Spain | 1:58.47; OR | Vladimir Selkov; Unified Team | 1:58.87 | Stefano Battistelli; Italy | 1:59.40 |
| 1996 Atlanta | Brad Bridgewater; United States | 1:58.54 | Tripp Schwenk; United States | 1:58.99 | Emanuele Merisi; Italy | 1:59.18 |
| 2000 Sydney | Lenny Krayzelburg; United States | 1:56.76; OR | Aaron Peirsol; United States | 1:57.35 | Matt Welsh; Australia | 1:57.59 |
| 2004 Athens | Aaron Peirsol; United States | 1:54.95; OR | Markus Rogan; Austria | 1:57.35 | Răzvan Florea; Romania | 1:57.56 |
| 2008 Beijing | Ryan Lochte; United States | 1:53.94; WR | Aaron Peirsol; United States | 1:54.33 | Arkady Vyatchanin; Russia | 1:54.93 |
| 2012 London | Tyler Clary; United States | 1:53.41; OR | Ryosuke Irie; Japan | 1:53.78 | Ryan Lochte; United States | 1:53.94 |
| 2016 Rio de Janeiro | Ryan Murphy; United States | 1:53.62 | Mitch Larkin; Australia | 1:53.96 | Evgeny Rylov; Russia | 1:53.97 |
| 2020 Tokyo | Evgeny Rylov; ROC | 1:53.27; OR | Ryan Murphy; United States | 1:54.15 | Luke Greenbank; Great Britain | 1:54.72 |
| 2024 Paris | Hubert Kós; Hungary | 1:54.26 | Apostolos Christou; Greece | 1:54.82 | Roman Mityukov; Switzerland | 1:54.85 |
| 2028 Los Angeles | | | | | | |

=== 50 metre breaststroke ===
| Games | Gold | Silver | Bronze |
|---|---|---|---|
| 2028 Los Angeles | | | |

=== 100 metre breaststroke ===
| Games | Gold | | Silver | | Bronze | |
|---|---|---|---|---|---|---|
| 1968 Mexico City | Don McKenzie; United States | 1:07.7; OR | Vladimir Kosinsky; Soviet Union | 1:08.0 | Nikolai Pankin; Soviet Union | 1:08.0 |
| 1972 Munich | Nobutaka Taguchi; Japan | 1:04.94; WR | Tom Bruce; United States | 1:05.43 | John Hencken; United States | 1:05.61 |
| 1976 Montreal | John Hencken; United States | 1:03.11; WR | David Wilkie; Great Britain | 1:03.43 | Arvydas Juozaitis; Soviet Union | 1:04.23 |
| 1980 Moscow | Duncan Goodhew; Great Britain | 1:03.34 | Arsens Miskarovs; Soviet Union | 1:03.82 | Peter Evans; Australia | 1:03.96 |
| 1984 Los Angeles | Steve Lundquist; United States | 1:01.65; WR | Victor Davis; Canada | 1:01.99 | Peter Evans; Australia | 1:02.97 |
| 1988 Seoul | Adrian Moorhouse; Great Britain | 1:02.04 | Károly Güttler; Hungary | 1:02.05 | Dmitry Volkov; Soviet Union | 1:02.20 |
| 1992 Barcelona | Nelson Diebel; United States | 1:01.50; OR | Norbert Rózsa; Hungary | 1:01.68 | Phil Rogers; Australia | 1:01.76 |
| 1996 Atlanta | Frédérik Deburghgraeve; Belgium | 1:00.65 set WR in heats | Jeremy Linn; United States | 1:00.77 | Mark Warnecke; Germany | 1:01.33 |
| 2000 Sydney | Domenico Fioravanti; Italy | 1:00.46; OR | Ed Moses; United States | 1:00.73 | Roman Sloudnov; Russia | 1:00.91 |
| 2004 Athens | Kosuke Kitajima; Japan | 1:00.08 | Brendan Hansen; United States | 1:00.25 set OR in semifinal | Hugues Duboscq; France | 1:00.88 |
| 2008 Beijing | Kosuke Kitajima; Japan | 58.91; WR | Alexander Dale Oen; Norway | 59.20 | Hugues Duboscq; France | 59.37 |
| 2012 London | Cameron van der Burgh; South Africa | 58.46; WR | Christian Sprenger; Australia | 58.93 | Brendan Hansen; United States | 59.49 |
| 2016 Rio de Janeiro | Adam Peaty; Great Britain | 57.13; WR | Cameron van der Burgh; South Africa | 58.69 | Cody Miller; United States | 58.87 |
| 2020 Tokyo | Adam Peaty; Great Britain | 57.37 | Arno Kamminga; Netherlands | 58.00 | Nicolò Martinenghi; Italy | 58.33 |
| 2024 Paris | Nicolò Martinenghi; Italy | 59.03 | Adam Peaty; Great Britain; Nic Fink; United States | 59.05 | | |
| 2028 Los Angeles | | | | | | |

=== 200 metre breaststroke ===
| Games | Gold | | Silver | | Bronze | |
|---|---|---|---|---|---|---|
| 1908 London | Frederick Holman; Great Britain | 3:09.2; WR | William Robinson; Great Britain | 3:12.8 | Pontus Hanson; Sweden | 3:14.6 |
| 1912 Stockholm | Walter Bathe; Germany | 3:01.8; OR | Wilhelm Lützow; Germany | 3:05.0 | Paul Malisch; Germany | 3:08.0 |
| 1920 Antwerp | Håkan Malmrot; Sweden | 3:04.4 | Thor Henning; Sweden | 3:09.2 | Arvo Aaltonen; Finland | 3:12.2 |
| 1924 Paris | Robert Skelton; United States | 2:56.6 set OR in heats | Joseph De Combe; Belgium | 2:59.2 | Bill Kirschbaum; United States | 3:01.0 |
| 1928 Amsterdam | Yoshiyuki Tsuruta; Japan | 2:48.8; OR | Erich Rademacher; Germany | 2:50.6 | Teófilo Yldefonso; Philippines | 2:56.4 |
| 1932 Los Angeles | Yoshiyuki Tsuruta; Japan | 2:45.4 | Reizo Koike; Japan | 2:46.6 set OR in semifinal | Teófilo Yldefonso; Philippines | 2:47.1 |
| 1936 Berlin | Tetsuo Hamuro; Japan | 2:41.5; OR | Erwin Sietas; Germany | 2:42.9 | Reizo Koike; Japan | 2:44.2 |
| 1948 London | Joe Verdeur; United States | 2:39.3; OR | Keith Carter; United States | 2:40.2 | Bob Sohl; United States | 2:43.9 |
| 1952 Helsinki | John Davies; Australia | 2:34.4; OR | Bowen Stassforth; United States | 2:34.7 | Herbert Klein; Germany | 2:35.9 |
| 1956 Melbourne | Masaru Furukawa; Japan | 2:34.7 | Masahiro Yoshimura; Japan | 2:36.7 | Kharis Yunichev; Soviet Union | 2:36.8 |
| 1960 Rome | Bill Mulliken; United States | 2:37.4 | Yoshihiko Osaki; Japan | 2:38.0 | Wieger Mensonides; Netherlands | 2:39.7 |
| 1964 Tokyo | Ian O'Brien; Australia | 2:27.8; WR | Georgy Prokopenko; Soviet Union | 2:28.2 | Chet Jastremski; United States | 2:29.6 |
| 1968 Mexico City | Felipe Muñoz; Mexico | 2:28.7 | Vladimir Kosinsky; Soviet Union | 2:29.2 | Brian Job; United States | 2:29.9 |
| 1972 Munich | John Hencken; United States | 2:21.55; WR | David Wilkie; Great Britain | 2:23.67 | Nobutaka Taguchi; Japan | 2:23.88 |
| 1976 Montreal | David Wilkie; Great Britain | 2:15.11; WR | John Hencken; United States | 2:17.26 | Rick Colella; United States | 2:19.20 |
| 1980 Moscow | Robertas Žulpa; Soviet Union | 2:15.85 | Albán Vermes; Hungary | 2:16.93 | Arsens Miskarovs; Soviet Union | 2:17.28 |
| 1984 Los Angeles | Victor Davis; Canada | 2:13.34; WR | Glenn Beringen; Australia | 2:15.79 | Étienne Dagon; Switzerland | 2:17.41 |
| 1988 Seoul | József Szabó; Hungary | 2:13.52 | Nick Gillingham; Great Britain | 2:14.12 | Sergio López; Spain | 2:15.21 |
| 1992 Barcelona | Mike Barrowman; United States | 2:10.16; WR | Norbert Rózsa; Hungary | 2:11.23 | Nick Gillingham; Great Britain | 2:11.29 |
| 1996 Atlanta | Norbert Rózsa; Hungary | 2:12.57 | Károly Güttler; Hungary | 2:13.03 | Andrey Korneyev; Russia | 2:13.17 |
| 2000 Sydney | Domenico Fioravanti; Italy | 2:10.87 | Terence Parkin; South Africa | 2:12.50 | Davide Rummolo; Italy | 2:12.73 |
| 2004 Athens | Kosuke Kitajima; Japan | 2:09.44; OR | Dániel Gyurta; Hungary | 2:10.80 | Brendan Hansen; United States | 2:10.87 |
| 2008 Beijing | Kosuke Kitajima; Japan | 2:07.64; OR | Brenton Rickard; Australia | 2:08.88 | Hugues Duboscq; France | 2:08.94 |
| 2012 London | Dániel Gyurta; Hungary | 2:07.28; WR | Michael Jamieson; Great Britain | 2:07.43 | Ryo Tateishi; Japan | 2:08.29 |
| 2016 Rio de Janeiro | Dmitriy Balandin; Kazakhstan | 2:07.46 | Josh Prenot; United States | 2:07.53 | Anton Chupkov; Russia | 2:07.70 |
| 2020 Tokyo | Zac Stubblety-Cook; Australia | 2:06.38; OR | Arno Kamminga; Netherlands | 2:07.01 | Matti Mattsson; Finland | 2:07.13 |
| 2024 Paris | Léon Marchand; France | 2:05.85; OR ER | Zac Stubblety-Cook; Australia | 2:06.79 | Caspar Corbeau; Netherlands | 2:07.90 |
| 2028 Los Angeles | | | | | | |

=== 50 metre butterfly ===
| Games | Gold | Silver | Bronze |
|---|---|---|---|
| 2028 Los Angeles | | | |

=== 100 metre butterfly ===
| Games | Gold | | Silver | | Bronze | |
|---|---|---|---|---|---|---|
| 1968 Mexico City | Doug Russell; United States | 55.9; OR | Mark Spitz; United States | 56.4 | Ross Wales; United States | 57.2 |
| 1972 Munich | Mark Spitz; United States | 54.27; WR | Bruce Robertson; Canada | 55.56 | Jerry Heidenreich; United States | 55.74 |
| 1976 Montreal | Matt Vogel; United States | 54.35 | Joe Bottom; United States | 54.50 | Gary Hall Sr. United States | 54.65 |
| 1980 Moscow | Pär Arvidsson; Sweden | 54.92 | Roger Pyttel; East Germany | 54.94 | David López-Zubero; Spain | 55.13 |
| 1984 Los Angeles | Michael Gross; West Germany | 53.08; WR | Pablo Morales; United States | 53.23 | Glenn Buchanan; Australia | 53.85 |
| 1988 Seoul | Anthony Nesty; Suriname | 53.00; OR | Matt Biondi; United States | 53.01 | Andy Jameson; Great Britain | 53.30 |
| 1992 Barcelona | Pablo Morales; United States | 53.32 | Rafał Szukała; Poland | 53.35 | Anthony Nesty; Suriname | 53.41 |
| 1996 Atlanta | Denis Pankratov; Russia | 52.27; WR | Scott Miller; Australia | 52.53 | Vladislav Kulikov; Russia | 53.13 |
| 2000 Sydney | Lars Frölander; Sweden | 52.00 | Michael Klim; Australia | 52.18 | Geoff Huegill; Australia | 52.22 |
| 2004 Athens | Michael Phelps; United States | 51.25; OR | Ian Crocker; United States | 51.29 | Andriy Serdinov; Ukraine | 51.36 |
| 2008 Beijing | Michael Phelps; United States | 50.58; OR | Milorad Čavić; Serbia | 50.59 | Andrew Lauterstein; Australia | 51.12 |
| 2012 London | Michael Phelps; United States | 51.21 | Chad le Clos; South Africa; Yevgeny Korotyshkin; Russia | 51.44 | none awarded | |
| 2016 Rio de Janeiro | Joseph Schooling; Singapore | 50.39; OR | László Cseh; Hungary; Chad le Clos; South Africa; Michael Phelps; United States | 51.14 | none awarded | |
| 2020 Tokyo | Caeleb Dressel; United States | 49.45; WR | Kristóf Milák; Hungary | 49.68 | Noe Ponti; Switzerland | 50.74 |
| 2024 Paris | Kristóf Milák; Hungary | 49.90 | Joshua Liendo; Canada | 49.99 | Ilya Kharun; Canada | 50.45 |
| 2028 Los Angeles | | | | | | |

=== 200 metre butterfly ===
| Games | Gold | | Silver | | Bronze | |
|---|---|---|---|---|---|---|
| 1956 Melbourne | William Yorzyk; United States | 2:19.3 | Takashi Ishimoto; Japan | 2:23.8 | György Tumpek; Hungary | 2:23.9 |
| 1960 Rome | Mike Troy; United States | 2:12.8; WR | Neville Hayes; Australia | 2:14.6 | Dave Gillanders; United States | 2:15.3 |
| 1964 Tokyo | Kevin Berry; Australia | 2:06.6; WR | Carl Robie; United States | 2:07.5 | Fred Schmidt; United States | 2:09.3 |
| 1968 Mexico City | Carl Robie; United States | 2:08.7 | Martyn Woodroffe; Great Britain | 2:09.0 | John Ferris; United States | 2:09.3 |
| 1972 Munich | Mark Spitz; United States | 2:00.70; WR | Gary Hall Sr. United States | 2:02.86 | Robin Backhaus; United States | 2:03.23 |
| 1976 Montreal | Mike Bruner; United States | 1:59.23; WR | Steve Gregg; United States | 1:59.54 | Bill Forrester; United States | 1:59.96 |
| 1980 Moscow | Sergey Fesenko Sr. Soviet Union | 1:59.76 | Philip Hubble; Great Britain | 2:01.20 | Roger Pyttel; East Germany | 2:01.39 |
| 1984 Los Angeles | Jon Sieben; Australia | 1:57.04; WR | Michael Gross; West Germany | 1:57.40 | Rafael Vidal; Venezuela | 1:57.51 |
| 1988 Seoul | Michael Gross; West Germany | 1:56.94; OR | Benny Nielsen; Denmark | 1:58.24 | Anthony Mosse; New Zealand | 1:58.28 |
| 1992 Barcelona | Melvin Stewart; United States | 1:56.26; OR | Danyon Loader; New Zealand | 1:57.93 | Franck Esposito; France | 1:58.51 |
| 1996 Atlanta | Denis Pankratov; Russia | 1:56.51 | Tom Malchow; United States | 1:57.44 | Scott Goodman; Australia | 1:57.48 |
| 2000 Sydney | Tom Malchow; United States | 1:55.35; OR | Denys Sylantyev; Ukraine | 1:55.76 | Justin Norris; Australia | 1:56.17 |
| 2004 Athens | Michael Phelps; United States | 1:54.04; OR | Takashi Yamamoto; Japan | 1:54.56 | Steve Parry; Great Britain | 1:55.52 |
| 2008 Beijing | Michael Phelps; United States | 1:52.03; WR | László Cseh; Hungary | 1:52.70 | Takeshi Matsuda; Japan | 1:52.97 |
| 2012 London | Chad le Clos; South Africa | 1:52.96 | Michael Phelps; United States | 1:53.01 | Takeshi Matsuda; Japan | 1:53.21 |
| 2016 Rio de Janeiro | Michael Phelps; United States | 1:53.36 | Masato Sakai; Japan | 1:53.40 | Tamás Kenderesi; Hungary | 1:53.62 |
| 2020 Tokyo | Kristóf Milák; Hungary | 1:51.25; OR | Tomoru Honda; Japan | 1:53.73 | Federico Burdisso; Italy | 1:54.45 |
| 2024 Paris | Léon Marchand; France | 1:51.21; OR NR | Kristóf Milák; Hungary | 1:51.75 | Ilya Kharun; Canada | 1:52.80 |
| 2028 Los Angeles | | | | | | |

=== 200 metre individual medley ===
| Games | Gold | | Silver | | Bronze | |
|---|---|---|---|---|---|---|
| 1968 Mexico City | Charlie Hickcox; United States | 2:12.0; OR | Greg Buckingham; United States | 2:13.0 | John Ferris; United States | 2:13.3 |
| 1972 Munich | Gunnar Larsson; Sweden | 2:07.17; WR | Tim McKee; United States | 2:08.37 | Steve Furniss; United States | 2:08.45 |
| 1976–1980 | not included in the Olympic program | | | | | |
| 1984 Los Angeles | Alex Baumann; Canada | 2:01.42; WR | Pablo Morales; United States | 2:03.05 | Neil Cochran; Great Britain | 2:04.38 |
| 1988 Seoul | Tamás Darnyi; Hungary | 2:00.17; WR | Patrick Kühl; East Germany | 2:01.61 | Vadim Yaroshchuk; Soviet Union | 2:02.40 |
| 1992 Barcelona | Tamás Darnyi; Hungary | 2:00.76 | Greg Burgess; United States | 2:00.97 | Attila Czene; Hungary | 2:01.00 |
| 1996 Atlanta | Attila Czene; Hungary | 1:59.91; OR | Jani Sievinen; Finland | 2:00.13 | Curtis Myden; Canada | 2:01.13; NR |
| 2000 Sydney | Massimiliano Rosolino; Italy | 1:58.98; OR | Tom Dolan; United States | 1:59.77; AM | Tom Wilkens; United States | 2:00.87 |
| 2004 Athens | Michael Phelps; United States | 1:57.14; OR | Ryan Lochte; United States | 1:58.78 | George Bovell; Trinidad and Tobago | 1:58.80; NR |
| 2008 Beijing | Michael Phelps; United States | 1:54.23; WR | László Cseh; Hungary | 1:56.52; ER | Ryan Lochte; United States | 1:56.53 |
| 2012 London | Michael Phelps; United States | 1:54.27 | Ryan Lochte; United States | 1:54.90 | László Cseh; Hungary | 1:56.22 |
| 2016 Rio de Janeiro | Michael Phelps; United States | 1:54.66 | Kosuke Hagino; Japan | 1:56.61 | Wang Shun; China | 1:57.05 |
| 2020 Tokyo | Wang Shun; China | 1:55.00; AS | Duncan Scott; Great Britain | 1:55.28; NR | Jérémy Desplanches; Switzerland | 1:56.17; NR |
| 2024 Paris | Léon Marchand; France | 1:54.06; OR ER | Duncan Scott; Great Britain | 1:55.31 | Wang Shun; China | 1:56.00 |
| 2028 Los Angeles | | | | | | |

=== 400 metre individual medley ===
| Games | Gold | Silver | Bronze |
|---|---|---|---|
| 1964 Tokyo | Dick Roth; United States | Roy Saari; United States | Gerhard Hetz; United Team of Germany |
| 1968 Mexico City | Charlie Hickcox; United States | Gary Hall Sr. United States | Michael Holthaus; West Germany |
| 1972 Munich | Gunnar Larsson; Sweden | Tim McKee; United States | András Hargitay; Hungary |
| 1976 Montreal | Rod Strachan; United States | Tim McKee; United States | Andrey Smirnov; Soviet Union |
| 1980 Moscow | Oleksandr Sydorenko; Soviet Union | Sergey Fesenko Sr. Soviet Union | Zoltán Verrasztó; Hungary |
| 1984 Los Angeles | Alex Baumann; Canada | Ricardo Prado; Brazil | Rob Woodhouse; Australia |
| 1988 Seoul | Tamás Darnyi; Hungary | David Wharton; United States | Stefano Battistelli; Italy |
| 1992 Barcelona | Tamás Darnyi; Hungary | Eric Namesnik; United States | Luca Sacchi; Italy |
| 1996 Atlanta | Tom Dolan; United States | Eric Namesnik; United States | Curtis Myden; Canada |
| 2000 Sydney | Tom Dolan; United States | Erik Vendt; United States | Curtis Myden; Canada |
| 2004 Athens | Michael Phelps; United States | Erik Vendt; United States | László Cseh; Hungary |
| 2008 Beijing | Michael Phelps; United States | László Cseh; Hungary | Ryan Lochte; United States |
| 2012 London | Ryan Lochte; United States | Thiago Pereira; Brazil | Kosuke Hagino; Japan |
| 2016 Rio de Janeiro | Kosuke Hagino; Japan | Chase Kalisz; United States | Daiya Seto; Japan |
| 2020 Tokyo | Chase Kalisz; United States | Jay Litherland; United States | Brendon Smith; Australia |
| 2024 Paris | Léon Marchand; France | Tomoyuki Matsushita; Japan | Carson Foster; United States |
| 2028 Los Angeles | | | |

=== 4 × 100 metre freestyle relay ===
| Games | Gold | Silver | Bronze |
|---|---|---|---|
| 1964 Tokyo | United States; Steve Clark; Mike Austin; Gary Ilman; Don Schollander; Lary Schulhof | United Team of Germany; Horst Löffler; Frank Wiegand; Uwe Jacobsen; Hans-Joachim Klein | Australia; David Dickson; Peter Doak; John Ryan; Bob Windle |
| 1968 Mexico City | United States; Zac Zorn; Stephen Rerych; Mark Spitz; Ken Walsh; Don Schollander; William Johnson; David Johnson; Michael Wall | Soviet Union; Semyon Belits-Geiman; Viktor Mazanov; Georgi Kulikov; Leonid Ilyichov | Australia; Greg Rogers; Bob Windle; Robert Cusack; Michael Wenden |
| 1972 Munich | United States; David Edgar; John Murphy; Jerry Heidenreich; Mark Spitz; Dave Fairbank; Gary Conelly | Soviet Union; Vladimir Bure; Viktor Mazanov; Viktor Aboimov; Igor Grivennikov | East Germany; Roland Matthes; Wilfried Hartung; Peter Bruch; Lutz Unger |
| 1976–1980 | not included in the Olympic program | | |
| 1984 Los Angeles | United States; Chris Cavanaugh; Mike Heath; Matt Biondi; Rowdy Gaines; Tom Jager; Robin Leamy | Australia; Greg Fasala; Neil Brooks; Michael Delany; Mark Stockwell | Sweden; Thomas Lejdström; Bengt Baron; Mikael Örn; Per Johansson |
| 1988 Seoul | United States; Chris Jacobs; Troy Dalbey; Tom Jager; Matt Biondi; Shaun Jordan; Doug Gjertsen; Brent Lang | Soviet Union; Gennadiy Prigoda; Yuri Bashkatov; Nikolay Yevseyev; Vladimir Tkacenko | East Germany; Dirk Richter; Thomas Flemming; Lars Hinneburg; Steffen Zesner |
| 1992 Barcelona | United States; Joe Hudepohl; Matt Biondi; Tom Jager; Jon Olsen; Shaun Jordan; Joel Thomas | Unified Team; Pavlo Khnykin; Gennadiy Prigoda; Yuri Bashkatov; Alexander Popov; Vladimir Pyshnenko; Veniamin Tayanovich | Germany; Christian Tröger; Dirk Richter; Steffen Zesner; Mark Pinger; Andreas Szigat; Bengt Zikarsky |
| 1996 Atlanta | United States; Jon Olsen; Josh Davis; Brad Schumacher; Gary Hall Jr. David Fox; Scott Tucker | Russia; Vladimir Pyshnenko; Alexander Popov; Roman Yegorov; Vladimir Predkin; Denis Pimankov | Germany; Mark Pinger; Björn Zikarsky; Christian Tröger; Bengt Zikarsky; Alexander Lüderitz |
| 2000 Sydney | Australia; Michael Klim; Chris Fydler; Ashley Callus; Ian Thorpe; Todd Pearson; Adam Pine | United States; Anthony Ervin; Neil Walker; Jason Lezak; Gary Hall Jr. Scott Tucker; Josh Davis | Brazil; Fernando Scherer; Gustavo Borges; Carlos Jayme; Edvaldo Valério |
| 2004 Athens | South Africa; Roland Schoeman; Lyndon Ferns; Darian Townsend; Ryk Neethling | Netherlands; Johan Kenkhuis; Mitja Zastrow; Klaas-Erik Zwering; Pieter van den Hoogenband; Mark Veens | United States; Ian Crocker; Michael Phelps; Neil Walker; Jason Lezak; Gabe Woodward; Nate Dusing; Gary Hall Jr. |
| 2008 Beijing | United States; Michael Phelps; Garrett Weber-Gale; Cullen Jones; Jason Lezak; Nathan Adrian; Ben Wildman-Tobriner; Matt Grevers | France; Amaury Leveaux; Fabien Gilot; Frédérick Bousquet; Alain Bernard; Grégory Mallet; Boris Steimetz | Australia; Eamon Sullivan; Andrew Lauterstein; Ashley Callus; Matt Targett; Leith Brodie; Patrick Murphy |
| 2012 London | France; Amaury Leveaux; Fabien Gilot; Clément Lefert; Yannick Agnel; Alain Bernard; Jérémy Stravius | United States; Nathan Adrian; Michael Phelps; Cullen Jones; Ryan Lochte; Jimmy Feigen; Matt Grevers; Ricky Berens; Jason Lezak | Russia; Andrey Grechin; Nikita Lobintsev; Vladimir Morozov; Danila Izotov; Yevgeny Lagunov; Sergey Fesikov |
| 2016 Rio de Janeiro | United States; Caeleb Dressel; Michael Phelps; Ryan Held; Nathan Adrian; Jimmy Feigen; Blake Pieroni; Anthony Ervin | France; Mehdy Metella; Fabien Gilot; Florent Manaudou; Jérémy Stravius; Clément Mignon; William Meynard | Australia; James Roberts; Kyle Chalmers; James Magnussen; Cameron McEvoy; Matthew Abood |
| 2020 Tokyo | United States; Caeleb Dressel; Blake Pieroni; Bowe Becker; Zach Apple; Brooks Curry | Italy; Alessandro Miressi; Thomas Ceccon; Lorenzo Zazzeri; Manuel Frigo; Santo Condorelli | Australia; Matthew Temple; Zac Incerti; Alexander Graham; Kyle Chalmers; Cameron McEvoy |
| 2024 Paris | United States; Jack Alexy; Chris Guiliano; Hunter Armstrong; Caeleb Dressel; Ryan Held; Matthew King | Australia; Jack Cartwright; Flynn Southam; Kai Taylor; Kyle Chalmers; William Yang | Italy; Alessandro Miressi; Thomas Ceccon; Paolo Conte Bonin; Manuel Frigo; Lorenzo Zazzeri; Leonardo Deplano |
| 2028 Los Angeles | | | |

Note: since 1984, swimmers who competed only in preliminary rounds also received medals.

=== 4 × 200 metre freestyle relay ===
| Games | Gold | Silver | Bronze |
|---|---|---|---|
| 1908 London | Great Britain; John Derbyshire; Paul Radmilovic; William Foster; Henry Taylor | Hungary; József Munk; Imre Zachár; Béla Las Torres; Zoltán Halmay | United States; Harry Hebner; Leo Goodwin; Charles Daniels; Leslie Rich |
| 1912 Stockholm | Australasia; Cecil Healy; Malcolm Champion; Leslie Boardman; Harold Hardwick | United States; Ken Huszagh; Harry Hebner; Perry McGillivray; Duke Kahanamoku | Great Britain; William Foster; Thomas Battersby; Jack Hatfield; Henry Taylor |
| 1920 Antwerp | United States; Perry McGillivray; Pua Kealoha; Norman Ross; Duke Kahanamoku | Australia; Henry Hay; William Herald; Ivan Stedman; Frank Beaurepaire | Great Britain; Leslie Savage; Percy Peter; Henry Taylor; Harold Annison |
| 1924 Paris | United States; Wally O'Connor; Harry Glancy; Ralph Breyer; Johnny Weissmuller | Australia; Maurice Christie; Ernest Henry; Frank Beaurepaire; Andrew Charlton | Sweden; Georg Werner; Orvar Trolle; Åke Borg; Arne Borg |
| 1928 Amsterdam | United States; Austin Clapp; Walter Laufer; George Kojac; Johnny Weissmuller | Japan; Nobuo Arai; Tokuhei Sada; Katsuo Takaishi; Hiroshi Yoneyama | Canada; Garnet Ault; Munroe Bourne; James Thompson; Walter Spence |
| 1932 Los Angeles | Japan; Yasuji Miyazaki; Masanori Yusa; Takashi Yokoyama; Hisakichi Toyoda | United States; Frank Booth; George Fissler; Maiola Kalili; Manuella Kalili | Hungary; András Wanié; László Szabados; András Székely; István Bárány |
| 1936 Berlin | Japan; Masanori Yusa; Shigeo Sugiura; Masaharu Taguchi; Shigeo Arai | United States; Ralph Flanagan; John Macionis; Paul Wolf; Jack Medica | Hungary; Árpád Lengyel; Oszkár Abay-Nemes; Ödön Gróf; Ferenc Csik |
| 1948 London | United States; Wally Ris; Jimmy McLane; Wally Wolf; Bill Smith | Hungary; Elemér Szathmáry; György Mitró; Imre Nyéki; Géza Kádas | France; Joseph Bernardo; Henri Padou Jr. René Cornu; Alexandre Jany |
| 1952 Helsinki | United States; Wayne Moore; Bill Woolsey; Ford Konno; Jimmy McLane | Japan; Hiroshi Suzuki; Yoshihiro Hamaguchi; Toru Goto; Teijiro Tanikawa | France; Joseph Bernardo; Aldo Eminente; Alexandre Jany; Jean Boiteux |
| 1956 Melbourne | Australia; Kevin O'Halloran; John Devitt; Murray Rose; Jon Henricks | United States; Dick Hanley; George Breen; Bill Woolsey; Ford Konno | Soviet Union; Vitaly Sorokin; Vladimir Struzhanov; Gennady Nikolayev; Boris Nikitin |
| 1960 Rome | United States; George Harrison; Dick Blick; Mike Troy; Jeff Farrell | Japan; Makoto Fukui; Hiroshi Ishii; Tsuyoshi Yamanaka; Tatsuo Fujimoto | Australia; David Dickson; John Devitt; Murray Rose; John Konrads |
| 1964 Tokyo | United States; Steve Clark; Roy Saari; Gary Ilman; Don Schollander | United Team of Germany; Horst-Günter Gregor; Gerhard Hetz; Frank Wiegand; Hans-Joachim Klein | Japan; Makoto Fukui; Kunihiro Iwasaki; Toshio Shoji; Yujiaki Okabe |
| 1968 Mexico City | United States; John Nelson; Stephen Rerych; Mark Spitz; Don Schollander | Australia; Greg Rogers; Graham White; Bob Windle; Michael Wenden | Soviet Union; Vladimir Bure; Semyon Belits-Geiman; Georgi Kulikov; Leonid Ilyichov |
| 1972 Munich | United States; John Kinsella; Fred Tyler; Steve Genter; Mark Spitz | West Germany; Klaus Steinbach; Werner Lampe; Hans Vosseler; Hans Fassnacht | Soviet Union; Igor Grivennikov; Viktor Mazanov; Georgi Kulikov; Vladimir Bure |
| 1976 Montreal | United States; Mike Bruner; Bruce Furniss; John Naber; Jim Montgomery | Soviet Union; Vladimir Raskatov; Andrey Bogdanov; Sergey Kopliakov; Andrey Krylov | Great Britain; Alan McClatchey; David Dunne; Gordon Downie; Brian Brinkley |
| 1980 Moscow | Soviet Union; Sergey Koplyakov; Vladimir Salnikov; Ivar Stukolkin; Andrey Krylov | East Germany; Frank Pfütze; Jörg Woithe; Detlev Grabs; Rainer Strohbach | Brazil; Jorge Fernandes; Marcus Mattioli; Cyro Delgado; Djan Madruga |
| 1984 Los Angeles | United States; Mike Heath; David Larson; Jeff Float; Bruce Hayes | West Germany; Thomas Fahrner; Dirk Korthals; Alexander Schowtka; Michael Gross | Great Britain; Neil Cochran; Paul Easter; Paul Howe; Andrew Astbury |
| 1988 Seoul | United States; Troy Dalbey; Matt Cetlinski; Doug Gjertsen; Matt Biondi | East Germany; Uwe Dassler; Sven Lodziewski; Thomas Flemming; Steffen Zesner | West Germany; Erik Hochstein; Thomas Fahrner; Rainer Henkel; Michael Gross |
| 1992 Barcelona | Unified Team; Dmitry Lepikov; Vladimir Pyshnenko; Veniamin Tayanovich; Yevgeny Sadovyi; Aleksey Kudryavtsev; Yury Mukhin | Sweden; Christer Wallin; Anders Holmertz; Tommy Werner; Lars Frölander | United States; Joe Hudepohl; Melvin Stewart; Jon Olsen; Doug Gjertsen; Scott Jaffe; Dan Jorgensen |
| 1996 Atlanta | United States; Josh Davis; Joe Hudepohl; Brad Schumacher; Ryan Berube; Jon Olsen | Sweden; Anders Lyrbring; Anders Holmertz; Christer Wallin; Lars Frölander | Germany; Christian Tröger; Aimo Heilmann; Christian Keller; Steffen Zesner; Konstantin Dubrovin; Oliver Lampe |
| 2000 Sydney | Australia; Ian Thorpe; Michael Klim; Todd Pearson; Bill Kirby; Grant Hackett; Daniel Kowalski | United States; Scott Goldblatt; Josh Davis; Jamie Rauch; Klete Keller; Nate Dusing; Chad Carvin | Netherlands; Martijn Zuijdweg; Johan Kenkhuis; Marcel Wouda; Pieter van den Hoogenband; Mark van der Zijden |
| 2004 Athens | United States; Michael Phelps; Ryan Lochte; Peter Vanderkaay; Klete Keller; Dan Ketchum; Scott Goldblatt | Australia; Grant Hackett; Michael Klim; Nicholas Sprenger; Ian Thorpe; Todd Pearson; Antony Matkovich; Craig Stevens | Italy; Emiliano Brembilla; Massimiliano Rosolino; Simone Cercato; Filippo Magnini; Matteo Pelliciari; Federico Cappellazzo |
| 2008 Beijing | United States; Michael Phelps; Ryan Lochte; Ricky Berens; Peter Vanderkaay; David Walters; Erik Vendt; Klete Keller | Russia; Danila Izotov; Yevgeny Lagunov; Nikita Lobintsev; Alexander Sukhorukov; Mikhail Polischuk | Australia; Patrick Murphy; Grant Hackett; Grant Brits; Nick Ffrost; Kirk Palmer; Leith Brodie |
| 2012 London | United States; Ryan Lochte; Conor Dwyer; Ricky Berens; Michael Phelps; Charlie Houchin; Matt McLean; Davis Tarwater | France; Amaury Leveaux; Grégory Mallet; Clément Lefert; Yannick Agnel; Jérémy Stravius | China; Hao Yun; Li Yunqi; Jiang Haiqi; Sun Yang; Lü Zhiwu; Dai Jun |
| 2016 Rio de Janeiro | United States; Conor Dwyer; Townley Haas; Ryan Lochte; Michael Phelps; Clark Smith; Jack Conger; Gunnar Bentz | Great Britain; Stephen Milne; Duncan Scott; Daniel Wallace; James Guy; Robbie Renwick | Japan; Kosuke Hagino; Naito Ehara; Yuki Kobori; Takeshi Matsuda |
| 2020 Tokyo | Great Britain; Tom Dean; James Guy; Matthew Richards; Duncan Scott; Calum Jarvis | ROC (ROC); Martin Malyutin; Ivan Girev; Evgeny Rylov; Mikhail Dovgalyuk; Aleksandr Krasnykh; Mikhail Vekovishchev | Australia; Alexander Graham; Kyle Chalmers; Zac Incerti; Thomas Neill; Mack Horton; Elijah Winnington |
| 2024 Paris | Great Britain; James Guy; Tom Dean; Matthew Richards; Duncan Scott; Jack McMillan; Kieran Bird | United States; Luke Hobson; Carson Foster; Drew Kibler; Kieran Smith; Brooks Curry; Blake Pieroni; Chris Guiliano | Australia; Maximillian Giuliani; Flynn Southam; Elijah Winnington; Thomas Neill; Kai Taylor; Zac Incerti |
| 2028 Los Angeles | | | |

Note: since 1984, swimmers who competed only in preliminary rounds also received medals.

=== 4 × 100 metre medley relay ===
| Games | Gold | Silver | Bronze |
|---|---|---|---|
| 1960 Rome | United States; Frank McKinney; Paul Hait; Lance Larson; Jeff Farrell | Australia; David Theile; Terry Gathercole; Neville Hayes; Geoff Shipton | Japan; Kazuo Tomita; Koichi Hirakida; Yoshihiko Osaki; Keigo Shimizu |
| 1964 Tokyo | United States; Thompson Mann; Bill Craig; Fred Schmidt; Steve Clark | United Team of Germany; Ernst Küppers; Egon Henninger; Horst-Günter Gregor; Hans-Joachim Klein | Australia; Peter Reynolds; Ian O'Brien; Kevin Berry; David Dickson |
| 1968 Mexico City | United States; Charlie Hickcox; Don McKenzie; Doug Russell; Ken Walsh | East Germany; Roland Matthes; Egon Henninger; Horst-Günter Gregor; Frank Wiegand | Soviet Union; Yuri Gromak; Vladimir Nemshilov; Vladimir Kosinsky; Leonid Ilyichov |
| 1972 Munich | United States; Mike Stamm; Tom Bruce; Mark Spitz; Jerry Heidenreich | East Germany; Roland Matthes; Klaus Katzur; Hartmut Flöckner; Lutz Unger | Canada; Erik Fish; William Mahony; Bruce Robertson; Robert Kasting |
| 1976 Montreal | United States; John Naber; John Hencken; Matt Vogel; Jim Montgomery | Canada; Stephen Pickell; Graham Smith; Clay Evans; Gary MacDonald | West Germany; Klaus Steinbach; Walter Kusch; Michael Kraus; Peter Nocke |
| 1980 Moscow | Australia; Mark Kerry; Peter Evans; Mark Tonelli; Neil Brooks | Soviet Union; Viktor Kuznetsov; Arsens Miskarovs; Yevgeny Seredin; Sergey Koplyakov | Great Britain; Gary Abraham; Duncan Goodhew; David Lowe; Martin Smith |
| 1984 Los Angeles | United States; Rick Carey; Steve Lundquist; Pablo Morales; Rowdy Gaines | Canada; Mike West; Victor Davis; Tom Ponting; Sandy Goss | Australia; Mark Kerry; Peter Evans; Glenn Buchanan; Mark Stockwell |
| 1988 Seoul | United States; David Berkoff; Richard Schroeder; Matt Biondi; Chris Jacobs | Canada; Mark Tewksbury; Victor Davis; Tom Ponting; Sandy Goss | Soviet Union; Igor Polyansky; Dmitry Volkov; Vadim Yaroshchuk; Gennadiy Prigoda |
| 1992 Barcelona | United States; Jeff Rouse; Nelson Diebel; Pablo Morales; Jon Olsen; David Berkoff; Hans Dersch; Melvin Stewart; Matt Biondi | Unified Team; Vladimir Selkov; Vasily Ivanov; Pavlo Khnykin; Alexander Popov; Vladimir Pyshnenko; Vladislav Kulikov; Dmitry Volkov | Canada; Mark Tewksbury; Jonathan Cleveland; Marcel Gery; Stephen Clarke; Tom Ponting |
| 1996 Atlanta | United States; Jeff Rouse; Jeremy Linn; Mark Henderson; Gary Hall Jr. Josh Davis; Kurt Grote; John Hargis; Tripp Schwenk | Russia; Vladimir Selkov; Stanislav Lopukhov; Denis Pankratov; Alexander Popov; Roman Ivanovsky; Vladislav Kulikov; Roman Yegorov | Australia; Phil Rogers; Michael Klim; Scott Miller; Steven Dewick; Toby Haenen |
| 2000 Sydney | United States; Lenny Krayzelburg; Ed Moses; Ian Crocker; Gary Hall Jr. Neil Walker; Tommy Hannan; Jason Lezak | Australia; Matt Welsh; Regan Harrison; Geoff Huegill; Michael Klim; Josh Watson; Ryan Mitchell; Adam Pine; Ian Thorpe | Germany; Stev Theloke; Jens Kruppa; Thomas Rupprath; Torsten Spanneberg |
| 2004 Athens | United States; Aaron Peirsol; Brendan Hansen; Ian Crocker; Jason Lezak; Lenny Krayzelburg; Mark Gangloff; Michael Phelps; Neil Walker | Germany; Steffen Driesen; Jens Kruppa; Thomas Rupprath; Lars Conrad; Helge Meeuw | Japan; Tomomi Morita; Kosuke Kitajima; Takashi Yamamoto; Yoshihiro Okumura |
| 2008 Beijing | United States; Aaron Peirsol; Brendan Hansen; Michael Phelps; Jason Lezak; Matt Grevers; Mark Gangloff; Ian Crocker; Garrett Weber-Gale | Australia; Hayden Stoeckel; Brenton Rickard; Andrew Lauterstein; Eamon Sullivan; Ashley Delaney; Christian Sprenger; Adam Pine; Matt Targett | Japan; Junichi Miyashita; Kosuke Kitajima; Takuro Fujii; Hisayoshi Sato |
| 2012 London | United States; Matt Grevers; Brendan Hansen; Michael Phelps; Nathan Adrian; Nick Thoman; Eric Shanteau; Tyler McGill; Cullen Jones | Japan; Ryosuke Irie; Kosuke Kitajima; Takeshi Matsuda; Takuro Fujii | Australia; Hayden Stoeckel; Christian Sprenger; Matt Targett; James Magnussen; Brenton Rickard; Tommaso D'Orsogna |
| 2016 Rio de Janeiro | United States; Ryan Murphy; Cody Miller; Michael Phelps; Nathan Adrian; David Plummer; Kevin Cordes; Tom Shields; Caeleb Dressel | Great Britain; Chris Walker-Hebborn; Adam Peaty; James Guy; Duncan Scott | Australia; Mitch Larkin; Jake Packard; David Morgan; Kyle Chalmers; Cameron McEvoy |
| 2020 Tokyo | United States; Ryan Murphy; Michael Andrew; Caeleb Dressel; Zach Apple; Hunter Armstrong; Blake Pieroni; Tom Shields; Andrew Wilson | Great Britain; Luke Greenbank; Adam Peaty; James Guy; Duncan Scott; James Wilby | Italy; Thomas Ceccon; Nicolò Martinenghi; Federico Burdisso; Alessandro Miressi |
| 2024 Paris | China; Xu Jiayu; Qin Haiyang; Sun Jiajun; Pan Zhanle; Wang Changhao | United States; Ryan Murphy; Nic Fink; Caeleb Dressel; Hunter Armstrong; Charlie Swanson; Thomas Heilman; Jack Alexy | France; Yohann Ndoye-Brouard; Léon Marchand; Maxime Grousset; Florent Manaudou; Clément Secchi; Rafael Fente-Damers |
| 2028 Los Angeles | | | |

Note: since 1984, swimmers who competed only in preliminary rounds also received medals.

== Mixed events ==
=== 4 × 100 metre medley relay ===
| Games | Gold | Silver | Bronze |
|---|---|---|---|
| 2020 Tokyo | Great Britain; Kathleen Dawson; Adam Peaty; James Guy; Anna Hopkin; Freya Anderson | China; Xu Jiayu; Yan Zibei; Zhang Yufei; Yang Junxuan | Australia; Kaylee McKeown; Zac Stubblety-Cook; Matthew Temple; Emma McKeon; Bronte Campbell; Isaac Cooper; Brianna Throssell |
| 2024 Paris | United States; Ryan Murphy; Nic Fink; Gretchen Walsh; Torri Huske; Regan Smith; Charlie Swanson; Caeleb Dressel; Abbey Weitzeil | China; Xu Jiayu; Qin Haiyang; Zhang Yufei; Yang Junxuan; Tang Qianting; Pan Zhanle | Australia; Kaylee McKeown; Joshua Yong; Matthew Temple; Mollie O'Callaghan; Iona Anderson; Zac Stubblety-Cook; Emma McKeon; Kyle Chalmers |
| 2028 Los Angeles | | | |

== Discontinued events ==
=== 50 yard freestyle ===
| Games | Gold | Silver | Bronze |
|---|---|---|---|
| 1904 St. Louis | Zoltán Halmay; Hungary | Scott Leary; United States | Charles Daniels; United States |

=== 100 metre for sailors ===
| Games | Gold | Silver | Bronze |
|---|---|---|---|
| 1896 Athens | Ioannis Malokinis; Greece | Spyridon Chazapis; Greece | Dimitrios Drivas; Greece |

=== 100 yard freestyle ===
| Games | Gold | Silver | Bronze |
|---|---|---|---|
| 1904 St. Louis | Zoltán Halmay; Hungary | Charles Daniels; United States | Scott Leary; United States |

=== 220 yard freestyle ===
| Games | Gold | Silver | Bronze |
|---|---|---|---|
| 1904 St. Louis | Charles Daniels; United States | Francis Gailey (AUS); United States (Note: As Australian Francis Gailey (AUS) represented an American club in 1900, his participation and medals at the 1900 Summer Olympics are attributed to the United States.) | Emil Rausch; Germany |

=== 440 yard freestyle ===
| Games | Gold | Silver | Bronze |
|---|---|---|---|
| 1904 St. Louis | Charles Daniels; United States | Francis Gailey (AUS); United States | Otto Wahle (AUT); United States (Note: As Austrian Otto Wahle (AUT) represented an American club in 1904, his participation and medals at the 1904 Summer Olympics are attributed to the United States.) |

=== 500 metre freestyle ===
| Games | Gold | Silver | Bronze |
|---|---|---|---|
| 1896 Athens | Paul Neumann; Austria | Antonios Pepanos; Greece | Efstathios Chorafas; Greece |

=== 880 yard freestyle ===
| Games | Gold | Silver | Bronze |
|---|---|---|---|
| 1904 St. Louis | Emil Rausch; Germany | Francis Gailey (AUS); United States | Géza Kiss; Hungary |

=== 1000 metre freestyle ===
| Games | Gold | Silver | Bronze |
|---|---|---|---|
| 1900 Paris | John Arthur Jarvis; Great Britain | Otto Wahle; Austria | Zoltán Halmay; Hungary |

=== 1200 metre freestyle ===
| Games | Gold | Silver | Bronze |
|---|---|---|---|
| 1896 Athens | Alfréd Hajós; Hungary | Ioannis Andreou; Greece | none awarded |

=== 1 mile freestyle ===
| Games | Gold | Silver | Bronze |
|---|---|---|---|
| 1904 St. Louis | Emil Rausch; Germany | Géza Kiss; Hungary | Francis Gailey (AUS); United States |

=== 4000 metre freestyle ===
| Games | Gold | Silver | Bronze |
|---|---|---|---|
| 1900 Paris | John Arthur Jarvis; Great Britain | Zoltán Halmay; Hungary | Louis Martin; France |

=== 100 yard backstroke ===
| Games | Gold | Silver | Bronze |
|---|---|---|---|
| 1904 St. Louis | Walter Brack; Germany | Georg Hoffmann; Germany | Georg Zacharias; Germany |

=== 400 metre breaststroke ===
| Games | Gold | Silver | Bronze |
|---|---|---|---|
| 1912 Stockholm | Walter Bathe; Germany | Thor Henning; Sweden | Percy Courtman; Great Britain |
| 1920 Antwerp | Håkan Malmrot; Sweden | Thor Henning; Sweden | Arvo Aaltonen; Finland |

=== 440 yard breaststroke ===
| Games | Gold | Silver | Bronze |
|---|---|---|---|
| 1904 St. Louis | Georg Zacharias; Germany | Walter Brack; Germany | Jam Handy; United States |

=== 200 metre team race ===
| Games | Gold | Silver | Bronze |
|---|---|---|---|
| 1900 Paris | Germany; Ernst Hoppenberg; Max Hainle; Ernst Lührsen; Gustav Lexau; Herbert von Petersdorff | France; Maurice Hochepied; Victor Hochepied; Joseph Bertrand; Verbecke; Victor Cadet | France; René Tartara; Louis Martin; Désiré Mérchez; Georges Leuillieux; Philippe Houben |

=== 4 × 50 yard freestyle relay ===
| Games | Gold | Silver | Bronze |
|---|---|---|---|
| 1904 St. Louis | United States; New York Athletic Club; Joe Ruddy; Leo Goodwin; Louis Handley; Charles Daniels | United States; Chicago Athletic Association; David Hammond; Bill Tuttle; Hugo Goetz; Raymond Thorne | United States; Missouri Athletic Club; Amedee Reyburn; Gwynne Evans; Marquard Schwarz; Bill Orthwein |

=== 200 metre obstacle race ===
| Games | Gold | Silver | Bronze |
|---|---|---|---|
| 1900 Paris | Frederick Lane (AUS); Great Britain | Otto Wahle; Austria | Peter Kemp; Great Britain |

=== Underwater swimming ===
| Games | Gold | Silver | Bronze |
|---|---|---|---|
| 1900 Paris | Charles Devendeville; France | André Six; France | Peder Lykkeberg; Denmark |

== All-time medal table – Swimming – Men – 1896–2024 ==
| Rank | Nation | Gold | Silver | Bronze | Total |
|---|---|---|---|---|---|
| 1 | United States | 143 | 100 | 71 | 314 |
| 2 | Australia | 33 | 37 | 38 | 108 |
| 3 | Japan | 17 | 22 | 21 | 60 |
| 4 | Germany | 17 | 20 | 25 | 62 |
| 5 | Hungary | 15 | 16 | 12 | 43 |
| 6 | Great Britain | 13 | 17 | 15 | 45 |
| 7 | France | 10 | 11 | 15 | 36 |
| 8 | Soviet Union | 9 | 14 | 18 | 41 |
| 9 | Sweden | 9 | 11 | 10 | 30 |
| 10 | Canada | 6 | 8 | 11 | 25 |
| 11 | China | 6 | 5 | 3 | 14 |
| 12 | Italy | 6 | 4 | 14 | 24 |
| 13 | Unified Team | 5 | 3 | 0 | 8 |
| 14 | Russia | 4 | 5 | 8 | 17 |
| 15 | Netherlands | 2 | 2 | 4 | 8 |
| 16 | ROC (ROC) | 2 | 2 | 1 | 5 |
| 17 | New Zealand | 2 | 1 | 2 | 5 |
| 18 | Tunisia | 2 | 0 | 1 | 3 |
| 19 | Austria | 1 | 6 | 3 | 10 |
| 20 | Brazil | 1 | 4 | 10 | 15 |
| 21 | South Korea | 1 | 3 | 1 | 5 |
| 22 | Australasia | 1 | 2 | 3 | 6 |
| 22 | Greece | 1 | 2 | 3 | 6 |
| 24 | South Africa | 1 | 2 | 1 | 4 |
| 25 | Belgium | 1 | 1 | 1 | 3 |
| 26 | Romania | 1 | 0 | 2 | 3 |
| 26 | Spain | 1 | 0 | 2 | 3 |
| 28 | Suriname | 1 | 0 | 1 | 2 |
| 29 | Argentina | 1 | 0 | 0 | 1 |
| 29 | Kazakhstan | 1 | 0 | 0 | 1 |
| 29 | Mexico | 1 | 0 | 0 | 1 |
| 29 | Singapore | 1 | 0 | 0 | 1 |
| 33 | Denmark | 0 | 2 | 1 | 3 |
| 34 | Finland | 0 | 1 | 3 | 4 |
| 35 | Cuba | 0 | 1 | 1 | 2 |
| 35 | Poland | 0 | 1 | 1 | 2 |
| 35 | Ukraine | 0 | 1 | 1 | 2 |
| 38 | Croatia | 0 | 1 | 0 | 1 |
| 38 | Norway | 0 | 1 | 0 | 1 |
| 38 | Serbia | 0 | 1 | 0 | 1 |
| 41 | Switzerland | 0 | 0 | 4 | 4 |
| 42 | Philippines | 0 | 0 | 2 | 2 |
| 43 | Trinidad and Tobago | 0 | 0 | 1 | 1 |
| 43 | Venezuela | 0 | 0 | 1 | 1 |
| Totals (44 entries) | | 315 | 307 | 311 | 933 |

== Youngest and oldest ==
=== Youngest and oldest medalists in individual events ===
| Youngest medalists | | NOC | Event | Medal | Games |
|---|---|---|---|---|---|
| 14 years, 309 days | Kusuo Kitamura | Japan | 1500 metre freestyle | Gold | 1932 Los Angeles |
| 15 years, 106 days | Dániel Gyurta | Hungary | 200 metre breaststroke | Silver | 2004 Athens |
| 15 years, 297 days | Yasuji Miyazaki | Japan | 100 metre freestyle | Gold | 1932 Los Angeles |
| 16 years, 61 days | John Kinsella | United States | 1500 metre freestyle | Silver | 1968 Mexico City |
| 16 years, 131 days | John Nelson | United States | 1500 metre freestyle | Silver | 1964 Tokyo |

| Oldest medalists | | NOC | Event | Medal | Games |
|---|---|---|---|---|---|
| 38 years, 25 days | William Robinson | Great Britain | 200 metre breaststroke | Silver | 1908 London |
| 35 years, 78 days | Anthony Ervin | United States | 50 metre freestyle | Gold | 2016 Rio de Janeiro |
| 33 years, 331 days | Duke Kahanamoku | United States | 100 metre freestyle | Silver | 1924 Paris |
| 33 years, 264 days | Florent Manaudou | France | 50 metre freestyle | Bronze | 2024 Paris |
| 33 years, 63 days | Frank Beaurepaire | Australia | 1500 metre freestyle | Bronze | 1924 Paris |

=== Youngest and oldest gold medalists in individual events ===
| Youngest medalists | | NOC | Event | Games |
|---|---|---|---|---|
| 14 years, 309 days | Kusuo Kitamura | Japan | 1500 metre freestyle | 1932 Los Angeles |
| 15 years, 297 days | Yasuji Miyazaki | Japan | 100 metre freestyle | 1932 Los Angeles |
| 16 years, 338 days | Boy Charlton | Australia | 1500 metre freestyle | 1924 Paris |
| 17 years, 7 days | Sándor Wladár | Hungary | 200 metre backstroke | 1980 Moscow |
| 17 years, 18 days | Dick Roth | United States | 400 metre individual medley | 1964 Tokyo |

| Oldest medalists | | NOC | Event | Games |
|---|---|---|---|---|
| 35 years, 78 days | Anthony Ervin | United States | 50 metre freestyle | 2016 Rio de Janeiro |
| 31 years, 40 days | Michael Phelps | United States | 200 metre butterfly | 2016 Rio de Janeiro |
| 30 years, 5 days | Duke Kahanamoku | United States | 100 metre freestyle | 1920 Antwerp |
| 29 years, 329 days | Gary Hall Jr. | United States | 50 metre freestyle | 2004 Athens |
| 28 years, 317 days | Yoshiyuki Tsuruta | Japan | 200 metre breaststroke | 1932 Los Angeles |

== See also ==
- List of Olympic medalists in swimming (women)
- List of individual gold medalists in swimming at the Olympics and World Aquatics Championships (men)
- List of gold medalist relay teams in swimming at the Olympics and World Aquatics Championships
- List of top Olympic gold medalists in swimming
- Swimming at the Summer Olympics
- List of World Aquatics Championships medalists in swimming (men)
- List of Asian Games medalists in swimming

== Notes ==
Main notes

Subnotes
