= Swimming at the 1900 Summer Olympics =

Swimming at the Games of the II Olympiad
- Swimming pictogram
- Venue: Seine
- Dates: 11–19 August 1900
- No. of events: 7
- Competitors: 76 from 12 nations

At the 1900 Summer Olympics in Paris, seven swimming events were contested. Only men competed in the swimming competition. There was a total of 76 participants from 12 countries competing. As with the rowing events, swimming took place on the Seine between the Courbevoie Bridge and the Asnières Bridge.

== Medal table ==
Rank	Nation	Gold	Silver	Bronze	Total
1	Great Britain	4	0	1	5
2	Germany	2	0	0	2
3	France	1	2	2	5
4	Austria	0	3	1	4
5	Hungary	0	2	1	3
6	Denmark	0	0	1	1
6	Netherlands	0	0	1	1
Totals (7 entries)		7	7	7	21

== Medal summary ==
Games	Gold	Silver	Bronze
200 m freestyle	Frederick Lane (GBR) (Note: As Australian Frederick Lane (AUS) represented a British swim club, his participation and medals are attributed to Great Britain. (Note: In 2024, the International Olympic Committee (IOC) reinstated its original and current attribution policy for athletes at the early Olympic Games (1896–1904). Participation and medals have been attributed according to the national affiliation of the club or team represented by the athlete, rather than their nationality.))	Zoltán Halmay (HUN)	Karl Ruberl (AUT)
1000 m freestyle	John Arthur Jarvis (GBR)	Otto Wahle (AUT)	Zoltán Halmay (HUN)
4000 m freestyle	John Arthur Jarvis (GBR)	Zoltán Halmay (HUN)	Louis Martin (FRA)
200 m backstroke	Ernst Hoppenberg (GER)	Karl Ruberl (AUT)	Johannes Drost (NED)
200 m team swimming	Germany; Ernst Hoppenberg; Max Hainle; Ernst Lührsen; Gustav Lexau; Herbert von Petersdorff	France; Maurice Hochepied; Victor Hochepied; Joseph Bertrand; Jules Verbecke; Victor Cadet	France; René Tartara; Louis Martin; Désiré Mérchez; Georges Leuillieux; Philippe Houben (Note: Houben did not compete; however, he is listed in the IOC's medal database as part of the Neptune team.)
200 m obstacle event	Frederick Lane (GBR)	Otto Wahle (AUT)	Peter Kemp (GBR)
Underwater swimming	Charles Devendeville (FRA)	André Six (FRA)	Peder Lykkeberg (DEN)

== Participating nations ==
A total of 76 swimmers from 12 nations competed at the Paris Games:

- Australia (1)
- Austria (4)
- Belgium (1)
- Denmark (1)
- France (47)
- Germany (6)
- Great Britain (7)
- Hungary (1)
- Italy (2)
- Netherlands (4)
- Sweden (1)
- United States (1)

== Notes ==
Main notes

Subnotes

== Non-medal events ==
In 1900, there was no official distinction between Olympic events and non-Olympic events held during the Exposition Universelle (1900). The swimming events satisfying the criteria for Olympic events are now generally distinguished from the professional swimming competitions held during the exposition, as being a professional event. Before July 2021, the IOC had never formally decided which events were "Olympic" and which were not.

There was one professional swimming event contested between 15 and 19 August

Games	First	Second	Third
4,000 metres freestyle (professionals)	Sam Greasley (GBR)	Will Evans (GBR)	Paul Blache (FRA)
