= Swimming at the 1900 Summer Olympics – Men's 200 metre freestyle =

Men's 200 metre freestyle at the Games of the II Olympiad
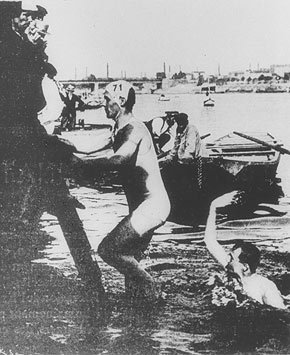
- Gold medalist Frederick Lane
- Venue: River Seine
- Dates: August 11 (semifinals); August 12 (final)
- Competitors: 26 from 10 nations
- Winning time: 2:25.2

Medalists
1st place, gold medalist(s)		Frederick Lane; Australia
2nd place, silver medalist(s)		Zoltán Halmay; Hungary
3rd place, bronze medalist(s)		Karl Ruberl; Austria

The men's 200 metre freestyle was a sprint swimming event in the Swimming at the 1900 Summer Olympics program in Paris. It was the shortest of the three freestyle events. It was held on 11 August and 12 August 1900. 26 swimmers from 10 nations competed. The event was won by Frederick Lane of Australia, with Zoltán Halmay of Hungary earning silver and Karl Ruberl of Austria earning bronze.

== Background ==
This was the first appearance of the 200 metre freestyle event. It would be contested a second time, though at 220 yards, in 1904. After that, the event did not return until 1968; since then, it has been on the programme at every Summer Games.

The two favourites for this race were Frederick Lane of Australia (who had won the British championships in the 220 yards in 1899, along with various other sprint titles in Great Britain, Australia, and New Zealand) and Rob Derbyshire of Great Britain (the British champion in 1898). The two men tied for the British title in 1900. But Derbyshire came down with a stomach virus and did not compete at the 1900 Games. Without him, Lane was heavily favoured. Zoltán Halmay of Hungary was likely the nearest contender.

== Competition format ==
The competition used a two-round format, with semifinals and a final. The entrants were divided into five semifinals; each semifinal had approximately 12 swimmers entered, though withdrawals left each with between 4 and 6 swimmers. The fastest swimmer in each semifinal advanced to the final along with the next five fastest times overall. This resulted in a 10-swimmer final.

The races were swum downstream in the Seine. This swimming event used freestyle swimming, which means that the method of the stroke is not regulated (unlike backstroke, breaststroke, and butterfly events).

== Records ==
There were no recognized records in the 200 metre freestyle before this competition. World records would not be recognized until 1902. Otto Wahle had the best time in the first semifinal at 2:35.6, setting the initial Olympic record. Karl Ruberl's fifth semifinal time was 2:22.6, which would stand as the record after these Games when the final times were all slower.

== Schedule ==
Date	Time	Round
Saturday, 10 August 1900	10:00	Semifinals
Sunday, 12 August 1900	14:30	Final

== Results ==
=== Semifinals ===
In the first round, there were five semifinals. The winner of each semifinal advanced to the final, as did the five fastest losers from across all the semifinals. The semifinals were held on 11 August.

==== Semifinal 1 ====
Rank	Swimmer	Nation	Time	Notes
1	Otto Wahle	Austria	2:35.6	Q, OR
2	Robert Crawshaw	Great Britain	2:40.0	q
3	Julius Frey	Germany	2:50.4	q
4	Erik Eriksson	Sweden	3:05.8	
5	Paolo Bussetti	Italy	3:35.0	

==== Semifinal 2 ====
Rank	Swimmer	Nation	Time	Notes
1	Zoltán Halmay	Hungary	2:38.0	Q
2	Peter Kemp	Great Britain	2:51.0	
3	R. Féret	France	3:12.2	
4	Victor Cadet	France	3:24.0	

==== Semifinal 3 ====
Rank	Swimmer	Nation	Time	Notes
1	Frederick Lane	Australia	2:59.0	Q
2	René Tartara	France	3:13.0	
3	Victor Hochepied	France	3:46.6	
4	Texier	France	3:47.0	
5	Pierre Peyrusson	France	3:47.6	
—	Pujol	France	DNF	

==== Semifinal 4 ====
Rank	Swimmer	Nation	Time	Notes
1	Jules Clévenot	France	3:05.0	Q
2	Herman Alexander	Netherlands	3:10.4	
3	Fred Hendschel	United States	3:42.0	
4	Richard von Foregger	Austria	4:32.0	
5	Jacques Léauté	France	4:39.4	

==== Semifinal 5 ====
Rank	Swimmer	Nation	Time	Notes
1	Karl Ruberl	Austria	2:22.6	Q, OR
2	Frederick Stapleton	Great Britain	2:47.0	q
3	Louis Martin	France	2:47.4	q
4	Maurice Hochepied	France	2:48.0	q
5	A. Adam	France	4:28.0	
6	Ronaux	France	4:36.4	

=== Final ===
The final was held on 12 August. Wahle did not start in the final. Lane won easily, more than six seconds ahead of Halmay and Ruberl.

Rank	Swimmer	Nation	Time
1st place, gold medalist(s)	Frederick Lane	Australia	2:25.2
2nd place, silver medalist(s)	Zoltán Halmay	Hungary	2:31.4
3rd place, bronze medalist(s)	Karl Ruberl	Austria	2:32.0
4	Robert Crawshaw	Great Britain	2:45.6
5	Maurice Hochepied	France	2:53.0
6	Frederick Stapleton	Great Britain	2:55.0
7	Jules Clévenot	France	2:56.2
8	Julius Frey	Germany	2:58.2
9	Louis Martin	France	Unknown
—	Otto Wahle	Austria	DNS

== Results summary ==
Rank	Swimmer	Nation	Semifinals	Final	Notes
1st place, gold medalist(s)	Frederick Lane	Australia	2:59.0	2:25.2	
2nd place, silver medalist(s)	Zoltán Halmay	Hungary	2:38.0	2:31.4	
3rd place, bronze medalist(s)	Karl Ruberl	Austria	2:22.6	2:32.0	OR
4	Robert Crawshaw	Great Britain	2:40.0	2:45.6	
5	Maurice Hochepied	France	2:48.0	2:53.0	
6	Frederick Stapleton	Great Britain	2:47.0	2:55.0	
7	Jules Clévenot	France	3:05.0	2:56.2	
8	Julius Frey	Germany	2:50.4	2:58.2	
9	Louis Martin	France	2:47.4	Unknown	
10	Otto Wahle	Austria	2:35.6	DNS	
11	Peter Kemp	Great Britain	2:51.0	Did not advance	
12	Erik Eriksson	Sweden	3:05.8	Did not advance	
13	Herman Alexander de By	Netherlands	3:10.4	Did not advance	
14	R. Féret	France	3:12.2	Did not advance	
15	René Tartara	France	3:13.0	Did not advance	
16	Victor Cadet	France	3:24.0	Did not advance	
17	Paolo Bussetti	Italy	3:35.0	Did not advance	
18	Fred Hendschel	United States	3:42.0	Did not advance	
19	Victor Hochepied	France	3:46.6	Did not advance	
20	Texier	France	3:47.0	Did not advance	
21	Pierre Peyrusson	France	3:47.6	Did not advance	
22	A. Adam	France	4:28.0	Did not advance	
23	Richard von Foregger	Austria	4:32.0	Did not advance	
24	Ronaux	France	4:36.4	Did not advance	
25	Jacques Léauté	France	4:39.4	Did not advance	
26	Pujol	France	DNF	Did not advance	
