= Swimming at the 1900 Summer Olympics – Men's 1000 metre freestyle =

Men's 1000 metre freestyle at the Games of the II Olympiad
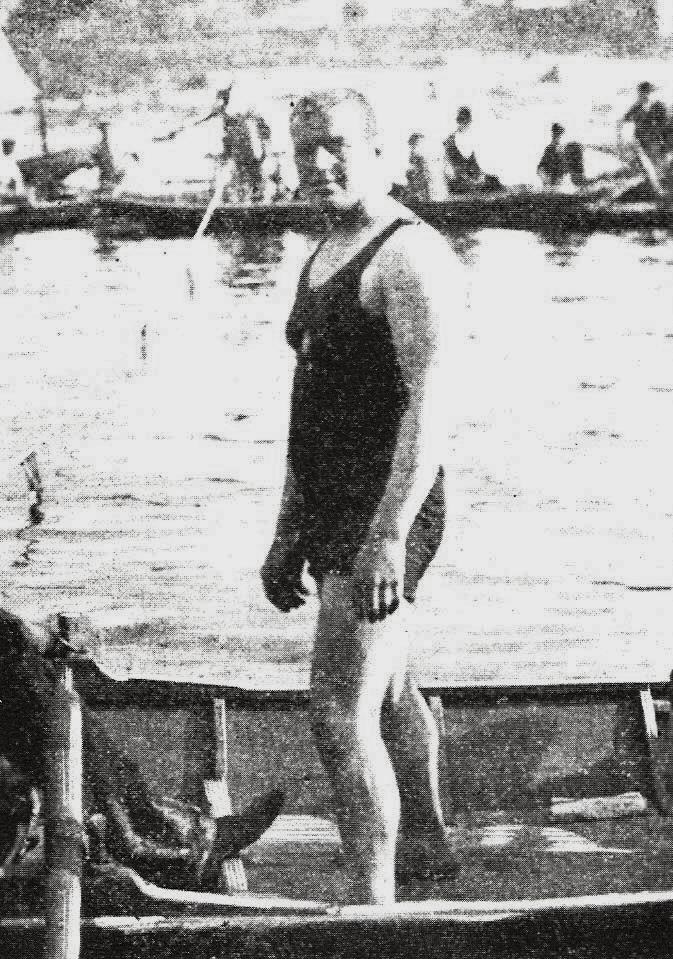
- Gold medalist John Arthur Jarvis
- Venue: River Seine
- Dates: August 11 (semifinals); August 12 (final)
- Competitors: 16 from 6 nations
- Winning time: 13:40.2 OR

Medalists
1st place, gold medalist(s)		John Arthur Jarvis; Great Britain
2nd place, silver medalist(s)		Otto Wahle; Austria
3rd place, bronze medalist(s)		Zoltán Halmay; Hungary

The men's 1000 metre freestyle was an event on the Swimming at the 1900 Summer Olympics schedule in Paris. It was the middle length of the three freestyle events. It was held on 11 August and 12 August 1900. 16 swimmers from 6 nations competed. The event was won by John Arthur Jarvis of Great Britain. Otto Wahle of Austria took silver, while Zoltán Halmay of Hungary earned bronze.

== Background ==
This was the only appearance of the 1000 metre freestyle event at the Olympics. It replaced the 1200 metres from 1896, and was itself replaced in 1904 with yard versions of the 800 and 1500 metre freestyle (880 yard and 1 mile). The 800 metre stayed on the program, while the 1500 would not return until 2020.

John Arthur Jarvis was the dominant long-distance swimmer of the time, and a heavy favourite in this event. He was in the midst of a run of British titles in the 880 yard (1898–1901), mile (1897–1902) and long-distance (1898–1904).

== Competition format ==
The competition used a two-round format, with semifinals and a final. The entrants were divided into four semifinals; each semifinal had 4 swimmers. The fastest swimmer in each semifinal advanced to the final along with the next six fastest times overall. This resulted in a 10-swimmer final.

The races were swum downstream in the Seine.

== Schedule ==
Date	Time	Round
Sunday, 11 August 1900	11:45	Semifinals
Monday, 12 August 1900	14:00	Final

== Results ==
=== Semifinals ===
In the first round, there were four semifinals. The winner of each semifinal advanced to the final, as did the six fastest losers from across all the semifinals. The semifinals were held on 11 August.

==== Semifinal 1 ====
Rank	Swimmer	Nation	Time	Notes
1	John Arthur Jarvis	Great Britain	14:28.6	Q, OR
2	Maurice Hochepied	France	17:13.2	q
3	Erik Eriksson	Sweden	17:41.2	q
4	Fumouze	France	18:00.0	

==== Semifinal 2 ====
Place	Swimmer	Nation	Time	Notes
1	Jules Verbecke	France	17:18.0	Q
2	Lué	France	24:15.0	
3	Lapostolet	France	25:52.0	
—	Souchu	France	DNF	

==== Semifinal 3 ====
Place	Swimmer	Nation	Time	Notes
1	Zoltán Halmay	Hungary	14:52.0	Q
2	Otto Wahle	Austria	15:27.0	q
3	Georges Leuillieux	France	17:09.6	q
4	Désiré Mérchez	France	18:17.2	

==== Semifinal 4 ====
Place	Swimmer	Nation	Time	Notes
1	Max Hainle	Germany	15:54.0	Q
2	Bill Burgess	Great Britain	16:54.0	q
3	Louis Martin	France	16:58.0	q
4	Texier	France	21:33.0	

=== Final ===
The final was held on 12 August. Jarvis won easily, more than a minute ahead of Wahle.

Rank	Swimmer	Nation	Time	Notes
1st place, gold medalist(s)	John Arthur Jarvis	Great Britain	13:40.2	OR
2nd place, silver medalist(s)	Otto Wahle	Austria	14:43.6	
3rd place, bronze medalist(s)	Zoltán Halmay	Hungary	15:16.4	
4	Max Hainle	Germany	15:22.6	
5	Louis Martin	France	16:30.4	
6	Georges Leuillieux	France	16:53.2	
7	Maurice Hochepied	France	16:53.4	
8	Jules Verbecke	France	17:13.8	
9	Erik Eriksson	Sweden	17:50.0	
—	Bill Burgess	Great Britain	DNF	

== Results summary ==
Rank	Swimmer	Nation	Semifinals	Final	Notes
1st place, gold medalist(s)	John Arthur Jarvis	Great Britain	14:28.6	13:40.2	OR
2nd place, silver medalist(s)	Otto Wahle	Austria	15:27.0	14:43.6	
3rd place, bronze medalist(s)	Zoltán Halmay	Hungary	14:52.0	15:16.4	
4	Max Hainle	Germany	15:54.0	15:22.6	
5	Louis Martin	France	16:58.0	16:30.4	
6	Georges Leuillieux	France	17:09.6	16:53.2	
7	Maurice Hochepied	France	17:13.2	16:53.4	
8	Jules Verbecke	France	17:18.0	17:13.8	
9	Erik Eriksson	Sweden	17:41.2	17:50.0	
10	Bill Burgess	Great Britain	16:54.0	DNF	
11	Fumouze	France	18:00.0	Did not advance	
12	Désiré Mérchez	France	18:17.2	Did not advance	
13	Texier	France	21:33.0	Did not advance	
14	Lué	France	24:15.0	Did not advance	
15	Lapostolet	France	25:52.0	Did not advance	
—	Souchu	France	DNF	Did not advance	
