= Swimming at the 1900 Summer Olympics – Men's 200 metre obstacle event =

Men's 200 metre obstacle course at the Games of the II Olympiad
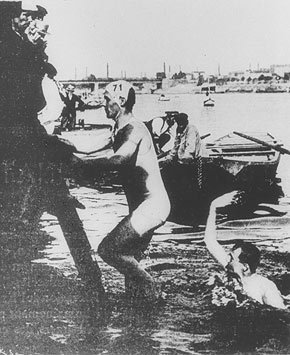
- Frederick Lane, after winning the gold medal
- Venue: River Seine
- Dates: August 11 (semifinals); August 12 (final)
- Competitors: 12 from 5 nations

Medalists
1st place, gold medalist(s)		Frederick Lane; Australia
2nd place, silver medalist(s)		Otto Wahle; Austria
3rd place, bronze medalist(s)		Peter Kemp; Great Britain

The men's 200 metre obstacle event was an obstacle swimming event in the 1900 Summer Olympics held in Paris. It was held on 11 August and 12 August 1900. Twelve swimmers from five nations competed. The event was won by Frederick Lane of Australia, with Otto Wahle of Austria second and Peter Kemp of Great Britain third. Lane had already won the 200 metre freestyle (with no obstacles).

== Background ==
This was the only appearance of obstacle swimming at the Olympics.

== Competition format ==
There were three obstacles throughout the 200 metre course. Swimmers had to climb over the first two (a pole and a row of boats), and swim under the third (another row of boats).

This swimming event used freestyle swimming, which means that the method of the stroke is not regulated (unlike backstroke, breaststroke, and butterfly events). The event consisted of two rounds: semifinals and a final. There were three semifinals, with 4 swimmers in each; the top 2 swimmers in each semifinal advanced to the final along with the 4 with the best times from the remaining swimmers. This made a 10-person final.

== Schedule ==
Date	Time	Round
Sunday, 11 August 1900	10:30	Semifinals
Monday, 12 August 1900	15:15	Final

== Results ==
=== Semifinals ===
The two fastest swimmers in each heat as well as the four fastest losers from across the three heats advanced. This meant that 10 of the 12 swimmers moved on to the final.

==== Semifinal 1 ====
Rank	Swimmer	Nation	Time	Notes
1	Frederick Lane	Australia	3:04.0	Q
2	Karl Ruberl	Austria	3:06.0	Q
3	Frederick Stapleton	Great Britain	3:18.4	q
4	Louis Marc	France	3:29.2	q

==== Semifinal 2 ====
Rank	Swimmer	Nation	Time	Notes
1	Otto Wahle	Austria	2:56.1	Q
2	William Henry	Great Britain	3:14.4	Q
3	Jules Verbecke	France	3:18.0	q
4	Victor Hochepied	France	3:37.2	

==== Semifinal 3 ====
Rank	Swimmer	Nation	Time	Notes
1	Peter Kemp	Great Britain	3:12.1	Q
2	Maurice Hochepied	France	3:16.2	Q
3	Joseph Bertrand	France	3:28.2	q
4	Fred Hendschel	United States	3:45.2	

=== Final ===
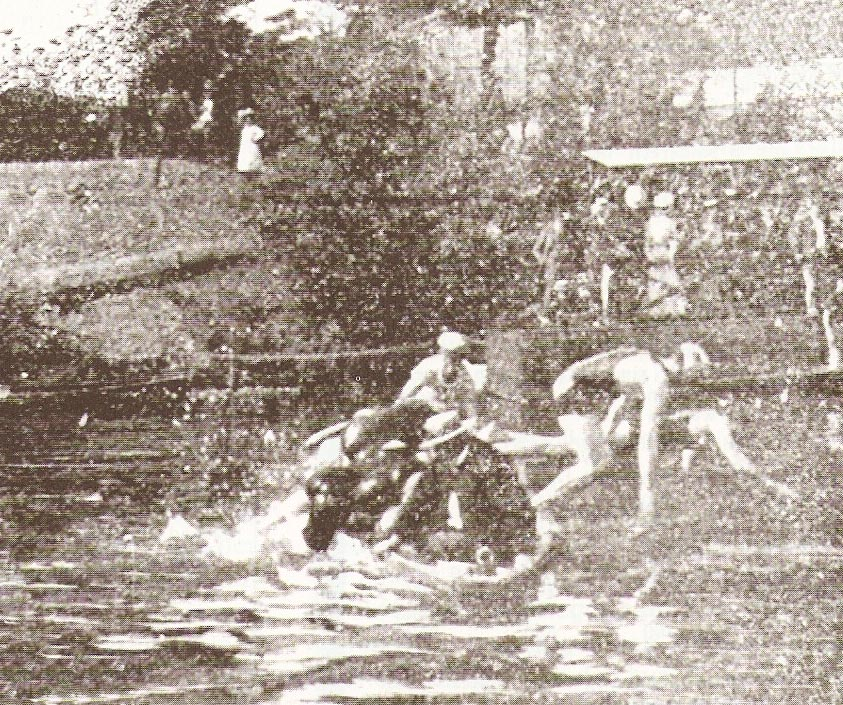
The obstacle swimming event

The final was held on 12 August.

Rank	Swimmer	Nation	Time
1st place, gold medalist(s)	Frederick Lane	Australia	2:38.4
2nd place, silver medalist(s)	Otto Wahle	Austria	2:40.0
3rd place, bronze medalist(s)	Peter Kemp	Great Britain	2:47.4
4	Karl Ruberl	Austria	2:51.2
5	Frederick Stapleton	Great Britain	2:55.0
6	William Henry	Great Britain	2:58.0
7	Maurice Hochepied	France	2:58.0
8	Jules Verbecke	France	3:08.4
9	Joseph Bertrand	France	3:17.0
10	Louis Marc	France	3:30.6
