= Swimming at the 1900 Summer Olympics – Men's 200 metre team swimming =

Men's 200 metre team swimming at the Games of the II Olympiad
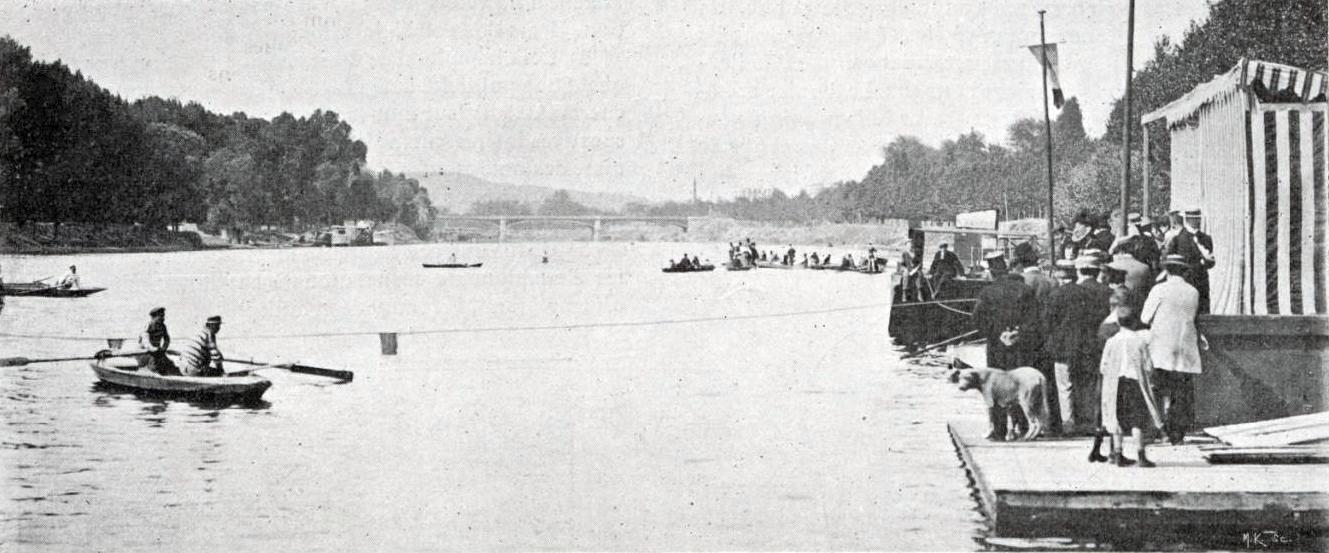
- The swimming venue in 1900
- Venue: River Seine
- Date: August 12
- Competitors: 20 from 2 nations
- Teams: 4

Medalists
1st place, gold medalist(s)		German Swimming Federation; Germany
2nd place, silver medalist(s)		Tritons Lillois; France
3rd place, bronze medalist(s)		Pupilles de Neptune de Lille; France

The men's 200 metre team swimming was an event on the swimming at the 1900 Summer Olympics schedule in Paris. It was held on August 12, 1900. 20 swimmers from two nations constituted four teams; 18 of the swimmers actually swam. The event was won by the German Swimming Federation, defeating three French teams. Tritons Lillois took silver, Pupilles de Neptune de Lille bronze, and Libellule de Paris fourth place.

== Background ==
This was the only time a team swimming event was held. The competition was supposed to include five teams, but the team from Great Britain arrived after the start of the competition.

== Competition format ==
There were four heats, with five swimmers in each heat.

Scoring used a fairly strange system: swimmers were seeded into the final heats through an initial ranking round, then received a number of points depending on what place they received in which heat. The five swimmers in the first heat were given between 1 and 5 points, with the winner receiving 1 and points increasing with place. The swimmers in the second heat received between 6 and 10 points, and so on.

The scores of the five swimmers on a team were summed, and the team with the fewest points won. This gave a strong advantage to the German team, which had three swimmers in the first heat, and an equally strong disadvantage to the Parisian team, with three swimmers in the fourth heat.

If points are given by best time regardless of heat, the Pupilles de Neptune and the Tritons switch places, though the Germans still win and the Parisian team still takes fourth.

Each race was 200 metres long. This swimming event used freestyle swimming, which means that the method of the stroke is not regulated (unlike backstroke, breaststroke, and butterfly events).

== Schedule ==
Date	Time	Round
Sunday, 11 August 1900		Round 1 Final

== Results ==
=== Round 1 ===
Each team had one swimmer in each of the five first-round heats. These heats determined in which final heat the swimmer would swim and thus the point range that the swimmer could achieve. No times are known from the results of this round.

==== Round 1 heat 1 ====
Rank	Swimmer	Nation	Team	Notes
1	Joseph Bertrand	France	Tritons Lillois	H1
2	B. Rosier	France	Libellule de Paris	H2
—	Herbert von Petersdorff	Germany	German Swimming Federation	DNS
—	Philippe Houben	France	Pupilles de Neptune de Lille	DNS

==== Round 1 heat 2 ====
Rank	Swimmer	Nation	Team	Points
1	Ernst Hoppenberg	Germany	German Swimming Federation	H1
2	Jules Clévenot	France	Libellule de Paris	H2
3	Georges Leuillieux	France	Pupilles de Neptune de Lille	H3
4	Victor Cadet	France	Tritons Lillois	H4

==== Round 1 heat 3 ====
Rank	Swimmer	Nation	Team	Points
1	Maurice Hochepied	France	Tritons Lillois	H1
2	Gustav Lexau	Germany	German Swimming Federation	H2
3	Louis Martin	France	Pupilles de Neptune de Lille	H3
4	R. Féret	France	Libellule de Paris	H4

==== Round 1 heat 4 ====
Rank	Swimmer	Nation	Team	Points
1	Ernst Lührsen	Germany	German Swimming Federation	H1
2	Désiré Mérchez	France	Pupilles de Neptune de Lille	H2
3	Victor Hochepied	France	Tritons Lillois	H3
4	Gasaigne	France	Libellule de Paris	H4

==== Round 1 heat 5 ====
Rank	Swimmer	Nation	Team	Points
1	Max Hainle	Germany	German Swimming Federation	H1
2	René Tartara	France	Pupilles de Neptune de Lille	H2
3	Jules Verbecke	France	Tritons Lillois	H3
4	Pelloy	France	Libellule de Paris	H4

=== Final ===
==== Final heat 1 ====
Rank	Swimmer	Nation	Team	Time	Points
1	Ernst Hoppenberg	Germany	German Swimming Federation	2:35.4	1
2	Max Hainle	Germany	German Swimming Federation	2:36.0	2
3	Maurice Hochepied	France	Tritons Lillois	2:53.0	3
4	Ernest Lührsen	Germany	German Swimming Federation	2:55.0	4
5	Joseph Bertrand	France	Tritons Lillois	3:00.0	5

==== Final heat 2 ====
Rank	Swimmer	Nation	Team	Time	Points
1	Gustav Lexau	Germany	German Swimming Federation	2:42.0	6
2	Jules Clévenot	France	Libellule de Paris	2:45.0	7
3	René Tartara	France	Pupilles de Neptune de Lille	2:48.6	8
4	Désiré Mérchez	France	Pupilles de Neptune de Lille	2:55.4	9
5	B. Rosier	France	Libellule de Paris	3:04.4	10

==== Final heat 3 ====
Rank	Swimmer	Nation	Team	Time	Points
1	Louis Martin	France	Pupilles de Neptune de Lille	2:51.4	11
2	Victor Hochepied	France	Tritons Lillois	2:56.4	12
3	Jules Verbecke	France	Tritons Lillois	3:01.6	13
4	Georges Leuillieux	France	Pupilles de Neptune de Lille	2:55.0	14

==== Final heat 4 ====
Rank	Swimmer	Nation	Team	Time	Points
1	R. Féret	France	Libellule de Paris	3:00.4	15
2	Louis Gazaigne	France	Libellule de Paris	3:02.0	16
3	Raymond Pelloy	France	Libellule de Paris	3:06.0	17
4	Victor Cadet	France	Tritons Lillois	3:18.0	18

==== Did not start ====
The following two swimmers did not compete and thus earned 19 points for their teams:

- Herbert von Petersdorff, German Swimming Federation
- Philippe Houben, Pupilles de Neptune de Lille

=== Team scores ===
Rank	Nation	Team	Swimmers	Points
1st place, gold medalist(s)	Germany	German Swimming Federation	Ernst Hoppenberg; Max Hainle; Ernest Lührsen; Gustav Lexau; Herbert von Petersdorff	32 1+2+4+6+19
2nd place, silver medalist(s)	France	Tritons Lillois	Maurice Hochepied; Joseph Bertrand; Victor Hochepied; Jules Verbecke; Victor Cadet	51 3+5+12+13+18
3rd place, bronze medalist(s)	France	Pupilles de Neptune de Lille	René Tartara; Désiré Mérchez; Louis Martin; Georges Leuillieux; Philippe Houben	61 8+9+11+14+19
4	France	Libellule de Paris	Jules Clévenot; B. Rosier; R. Féret; Louis Gazaigne; Raymond Pelloy	65 7+10+15+16+17
