= Hochepied =

Hochepied is a surname. Notable people with the surname include:

- Catharina Anna Grandon de Hochepied (1767–1803), Hungarian-Swedish noble
- Maurice Hochepied (1881–1960), French Olympic swimmer and water polo player, brother of Victor
- Victor Hochepied (1883–1966), French Olympic swimmer, brother of Maurice
