= Clévenot =

Clévenot (French: [klevəno]) is a French surname. Notable people with the surname include:

- Jules Clévenot (1876–1933), French water polo player, swimmer, and Olympian
- Trévor Clévenot (born 1994), French volleyball player
