= Karl Ruberl =

Austrian swimmer

Personal information
- Born: October 3, 1881 Vienna, Austria-Hungary
- Died: December 12, 1966 (aged 85) New York City, New York, United States

Sport
- Sport: Swimming
Medal record
Representing Austrian Empire
Olympic Games
| Silver medal – second place | 1900 Paris | 200 m backstroke |
| Bronze medal – third place | 1900 Paris | 200 m freestyle |

Karl Ruberl (October 3, 1881 – December 12, 1966), also known as Charles Ruberl Sr., was an Austrian swimmer who competed in the late 19th century and early 20th century in the 200 meter events. He participated in swimming at the 1900 Summer Olympics in Paris and won the silver medal in the 200 meter backstroke and the bronze medal in the 200 meter freestyle.

At the 1900 Summer Olympics, Ruberl competed in three events, in the 200 metre freestyle he swam in the last heat which he won and in the process and a set new Olympic record time of 2 minutes 22.6 seconds; he could not repeat the time in the final and finished in third place earning a bronze medal. He also competed in the 200 metre backstroke and again he won his heat in a time of 2 minutes 56 seconds; in the final he swam the same time and finished in silver medal position. Ruberl also competed in the 200 metre obstacle event, where he came second in his heat and then finished fourth in the final.

After the Olympics Karl immigrated to (1900) and then became a naturalized citizen (1904) of the United States. During this process he changed his name to Charles Ruberl. He continued competitive swimming for the New York Athletic Club and set several American swimming records and in 1903 he won three National titles. After his swimming career he went into banking, and then helped found Bainbridge, Ryan & Ruberl – a stock brokerage firm trading on the New York Stock Exchange. Mr. Ruberl also was an accomplished musician and performed with the Brooklyn Academy of Music on violin and piano. He retired before the 1929 stock market crash and lived in New York City until his death in 1966. He was a friend of Otto Wahle, another Austrian swimmer who also immigrated to the US.

Karl married Lida St. George and is survived, as of October 2007, by four great-grandchildren, four grandchildren and a daughter-in-law – all of whom reside in the US.
