= Ernst Hoppenberg =

German swimmer (1878–1937)

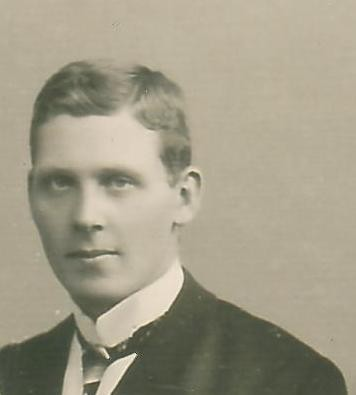

Personal information
- Born: 26 July 1878 Bremen, German Empire
- Died: 29 September 1937 (aged 59) Kirn, Germany

Sport
- Sport: Swimming
Medal record
Representing Germany
Olympic Games
Gold medal – first place	1900 Paris	200 m backstroke
Gold medal – first place	1900 Paris	200 m team

Ernst Heinrich Hoppenberg (26 July 1878 – 29 September 1937) was a German swimmer and water polo player who competed in the late 19th century and early 20th century in the 200 metre events. He participated in Swimming at the 1900 Summer Olympics in Paris and won two gold medals in the 200 metre backstroke and 200 m team race for Germany.

He was also a member of the German water polo team but he did not participate in the only match for Germany in the 1900 tournament. He died in a traffic accident.

== See also ==
- List of members of the International Swimming Hall of Fame
