= German Swimming Federation =

Sports governing body in Germany

LEN
- Association crest
- Founded: 1886
- FINA affiliation: 1908
- LEN affiliation: xxxx
- President: Christa Thiel

The German Swimming Federation (German: Deutscher Schwimm-Verband), or DSV, is the aquatics national federation for Germany. It oversees competition in the 5 aquatics disciplines (swimming, diving, synchronized swimming, water polo and open water swimming; and Masters competition in these).

It is affiliated to:

- FINA, which oversees international swimming;
- LEN, which oversees swimming in Europe;
- the German Olympic Sports Confederation; and
- the German Government's Secretary of State for Sport.

Among other responsibilities, DSV is charged with:

- fielding German teams to international aquatics competitions (such as the Olympics),
- maintaining the German Records for swimming,
- organizing German Championships in aquatics.

DSV was created on 8 August 1886. It has its headquarters in Kassel.

== Organisation ==
- President: Christa Thiel

== See also ==
- de:Deutscher Schwimm-Verbandn–DSV's page on German Wikipedia.
- (in German) www.dsv.de—official website.
