= Frederick Lane =

Australian swimmer (1880–1969)

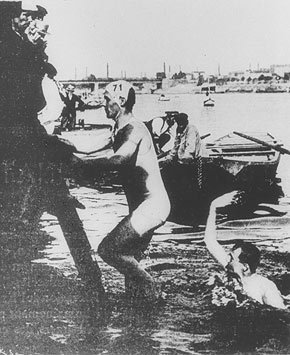
- Lane at 1900 Olympics

Personal information
- Full name: Frederick Claude Vivian Lane
- Born: 2 February 1880 Millers Point, New South Wales, Australia
- Died: 14 May 1969 (aged 89) Avalon Beach, New South Wales, Australia

Sport
- Sport: Swimming
- Strokes: Freestyle
- Club: Blackpool SC; East Sydney Amateur SC
Medal record
Men's Swimming
Representing Great Britain
Olympic Games
Gold medal – first place	1900 Paris	200 m freestyle
Gold medal – first place	1900 Paris	200 m obstacle

Frederick Claude Vivian Lane (2 February 1880 – 14 May 1969) was an Australian swimmer who competed at the 1900 Summer Olympics.

Lane, from Manly, New South Wales, was four years old when his brother saved him from drowning in Sydney Harbour, whereupon he decided to learn to swim. Later, he attended high school at Saint Ignatius' College, Riverview.

After breaking many Australasian swimming records, Lane moved to England to compete in the English Championships in 1899.

He was the first Australian to represent his country in swimming at the Olympic Games, when he competed at the 1900 Summer Olympics in Paris, and won two gold medals. He first won the 200 metres freestyle, clearly beating Hungarian Zoltán Halmay. His second final was just 45 minutes later, the discontinued 200 metre obstacle event, where he beat Austrian Otto Wahle. Although an Australian, he represented the Amateur Swimming Association of Great Britain and competed for the British Blackpool Swimming Club. As he represented a British club, the International Olympic Committee (IOC) attributes his participation and medals to Great Britain.

After the Olympics, Lane stayed in England for another two years working for a legal firm in Blackpool while he continued to swim and break records. In July 1902, he won a 100-yard race and became the first person to record one minute dead for that distance. In August, he swam 220 yards in 2 minutes 28.6 seconds, which in 1974 was ratified by FINA as the first World Record for 200 metres. In October, he broke the one-minute barrier for 100 yards in 59.6 seconds.

On returning to Australia, Lane became a master printer and a partner in a printing and stationery firm on Bridge Street. He married in 1908. He died in 1969 at Avalon Beach.

In 1969, Lane was honoured by the International Swimming Hall of Fame in Fort Lauderdale, Florida.

On 10 December 1985, Lane was inducted into the Sport Australia Hall of Fame. In 2022, he was an inaugural inductee of the Swimming Australia Hall of Fame.

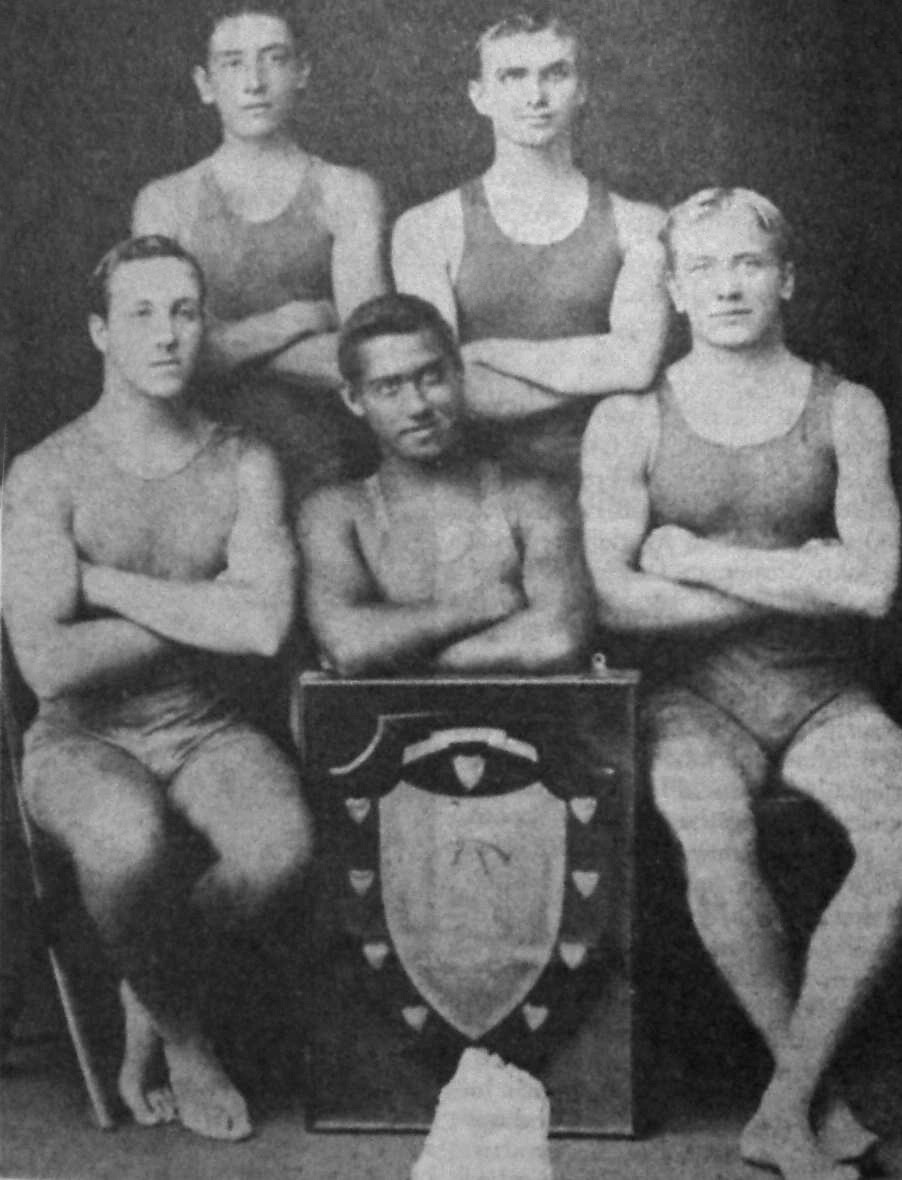
Lane, standing at right, with Manly Swimming Club teammates

== See also ==
- List of members of the International Swimming Hall of Fame
- List of Olympic medalists in swimming (men)
- World record progression 200 metres freestyle
