= Otto Wahle =

Austrian swimmer

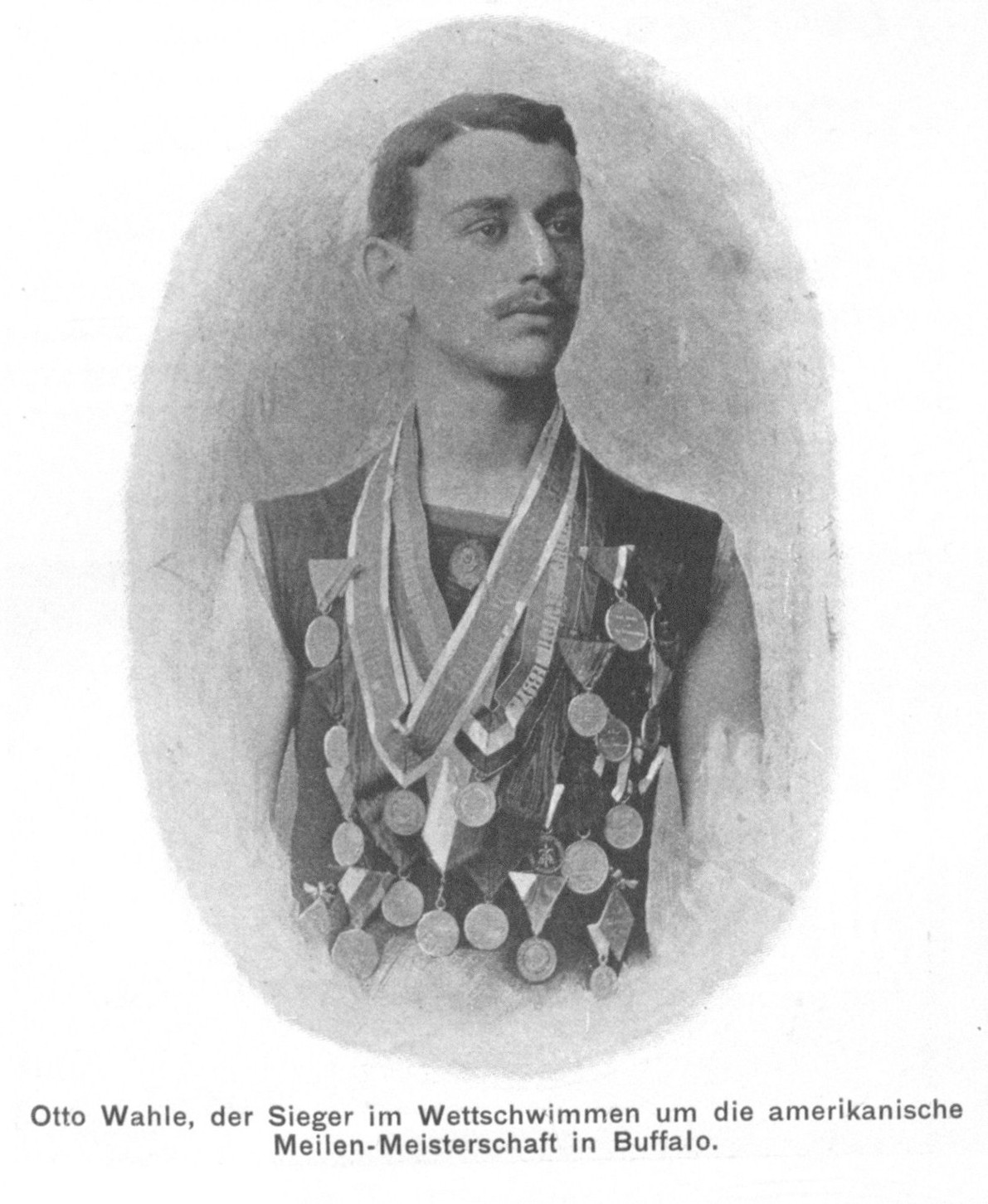
- Wahle in 1901

Personal information
- National team: Austrian Empire
- Born: 5 November 1879 Vienna, Austria-Hungary
- Died: 11 August 1963 (aged 83) Forest Hills, Queens, New York, U.S.
Medal record
Men's Swimming
Representing Austrian Empire
Olympic Games
Silver medal – second place	1900 Paris	200 m obstacle
Silver medal – second place	1900 Paris	1000 m freestyle
Representing United States
Olympic Games
Bronze medal – third place	1904 St. Louis	440 yd freestyle

Otto Wahle (5 November 1879 – 11 August 1963) was an Austrian-American swimmer who took part in two Summer Olympic Games and won a total of three medals. Wahle coached the men's US swim team at the 1912 Olympics, and the men's US water polo team at the 1920 and 1924 Olympics.

== 1900 Paris Olympics ==
At age 20, Wahle participated in three events at the 1900 Summer Olympics in Paris, France. He competed in the 200 metre freestyle and won his heat, but, for an unknown reason, he did not compete in the final.

=== 1000 metre Silver medal ===
He entered the 1000 metre freestyle, finishing second behind Hungarian swimmer Zoltán Halmay, qualifying for the final the next day. In the final he was beaten by John Arthur Jarvis from Great Britain but finished ahead of Halmay to win the silver medal.

=== 200 metre silver medal ===
Wahle also won a silver medal in the 200 metre obstacle event. After winning his heat, Wahle missed the gold medal by under two seconds to Australian swimmer Frederick Lane.

In 1901, Wahle moved to New York City and became a member of the legendary New York Athletic Club.

== 1904 St. Louis Olympics ==
Three years later, he competed at the 1904 Summer Olympics, held in St. Louis, Missouri, entering three events. He finished fourth in the 1 mile freestyle, and fifth in the 880 yard freestyle.

=== 440-yard bronze medal ===
Wahle won a bronze medal in the 440 yard freestyle, finishing behind Americans Charles Daniels and Francis Gailey.

== Coaching career and later life ==
In 1906, Wahle became a US citizen. He worked as the American swimming team coach for the 1912 Summer Olympics, where he coached future Gen. George S. Patton Jr. for the swimming portion of the pentathlon. At the 1920 and 1924 Summer Olympics, he was the coach of the American water polo team.

Wahle played a major role in the growth of swimming as a competitive sport in the United States and wrote many of the rules listed in early Amateur Athletic Union manuals.

He died in 1963 in Forest Hills, Queens, and was inducted in to the International Swimming Hall of Fame in 1968. In 1990, he was inducted into the USA Water Polo Hall of Fame.

== See also ==
- List of members of the International Swimming Hall of Fame
- List of select Jewish swimmers
