= John Arthur Jarvis =

British swimmer

John Jarvis
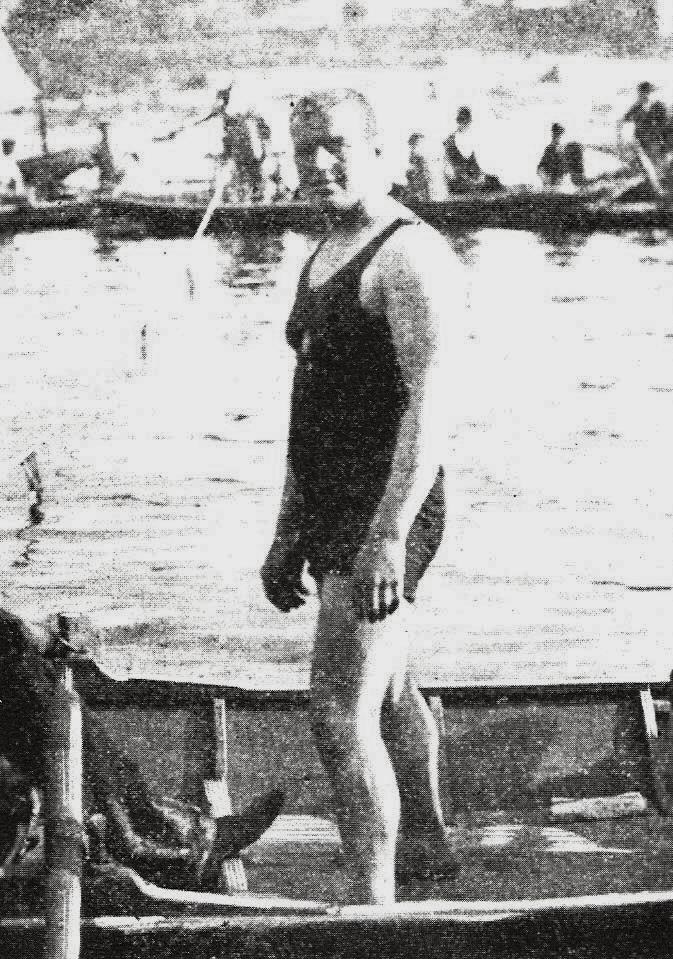
- Jarvis in 1900

Personal information
- Full name: John Arthur Jarvis
- National team: Great Britain
- Born: 24 February 1872 Leicester, England
- Died: 9 May 1933 (aged 61) St Pancras, London, England

Sport
- Sport: Swimming
- Strokes: Freestyle
- Club: Osborne SC, Leicester SC
Medal record
Representing Great Britain
Men's swimming
Olympic Games
Gold medal – first place	1900 Paris	1000 m freestyle
Gold medal – first place	1900 Paris	4000 m freestyle
Intercalated Games
Silver medal – second place	1906 Athens	1 mile
Bronze medal – third place	1906 Athens	400 m freestyle
Bronze medal – third place	1906 Athens	4×250 m freestyle
Men's water polo
Olympic Games
Gold medal – first place	1900 Paris	Men's tournament

John Arthur Jarvis (24 February 1872 – 9 May 1933) was an English competitive swimmer who represented Great Britain in three Olympic Games, and was a well-known amateur athlete of the late 19th century and early 20th century. He participated in Swimming at the 1900 Summer Olympics in Paris and won two gold medals in the 1000-metre and the 4000-metre freestyle events. He also won a gold medal in the water polo tournament.

Jarvis was born in Leicester. He was inducted into the International Swimming Hall of Fame as an "Honor Swimmer" in 1968.

== See also ==
- Great Britain men's Olympic water polo team records and statistics
- List of members of the International Swimming Hall of Fame
- List of multi-sport athletes
- List of multi-sport champions
- List of Olympic champions in men's water polo
- List of Olympic medalists in swimming (men)
- List of Olympic medalists in water polo (men)
