= Max Hainle =

German swimmer

Personal information
- Born: February 23, 1882 Dortmund, German Empire
- Died: May 27, 1924 (aged 42)

Sport
- Sport: Swimming
Medal record
Representing Germany
Olympic Games
Gold medal – first place	1900 Paris	200 m team

Max Otto Hainle (23 February 1882 – 27 May 1924) was a German swimmer who competed in the 1900 Summer Olympics. He was born in Dortmund. As a member of the German swimming team he won the gold medal at the Paris Games. He also competed in the 1000 metre freestyle event and finished fourth.
