= Herbert von Petersdorff =

German swimmer

Personal information
- Born: 2 January 1882 Berlin, German Empire
- Died: 5 July 1964 (aged 82) Darmstadt, West Germany

Sport
- Sport: Swimming
Medal record
Representing Germany
Olympic Games
Gold medal – first place	1900 Paris	200 m team

Herbert Willibald Bernhard von Petersdorff (2 January 1882 – 5 July 1964) was a German swimmer who competed in the 1900 Summer Olympics. He was a member of the German swimming team, which won the gold medal at the Paris Games. He was born in Berlin.
