= Gustav Lexau =

German swimmer and water polo player

Personal information
- Nationality: German

Sport
- Sport: Water polo, swimming
- Club: Altonaer Sportverein von 1896

Gustav Lexau was a German swimmer and water polo player. He competed in the men's tournament at the 1900 Summer Olympics, and he was part of the German team that won the gold medal in the men's 200 metre team swimming event.
