= Peter Kemp (swimmer) =

British swimmer

Personal information
- Full name: Peter Anderson Kemp
- Nationality: British
- Born: 8 April 1877 Galashiels, Scotland
- Died: 9 June 1965 (aged 88) Northampton, England

Sport
- Sport: Swimming, water polo
- Event(s): Freestyle, water polo
- Club: Osborne Swimming Club
Medal record
Representing Great Britain
Olympic Games
Men's swimming
| Bronze medal – third place | 1900 Paris | 200 m obstacle |
Men's water polo
| Gold medal – first place | 1900 Paris | Team competition |

Peter Anderson Kemp (8 April 1877 – 9 June 1965) was a British competitive swimmer and water polo player of the late 19th and early 20th centuries. He participated in water polo and swimming at the 1900 Summer Olympics in Paris, and won a bronze medal in the 200-metre obstacle event, and a gold medal in water polo as a member of the British team.

== See also ==
- Great Britain men's Olympic water polo team records and statistics
- List of Olympic medalists in swimming (men)
- List of Olympic medalists in water polo (men)
- List of Olympic champions in men's water polo
