= Jules Clévenot =

French water polo player and swimmer

Personal information
- Born: 7 June 1875 Schirmeck, German Empire
- Died: 11 September 1933 (aged 58) Paris, France

Sport
- Sport: Swimming, water polo
- Club: Libellule de Paris
Medal record
Representing France
Olympic Games
Bronze medal – third place	1900 Paris	Team competition

Jules Clévenot (French: [ʒyl klevəno]; 7 June 1875 – 11 September 1933) was a French water polo player and swimmer. He won a bronze medal in water polo at the 1900 Summer Olympics and finished seventh and fourth in the 200 m freestyle and 200 m team swimming, respectively.

He was a Summer Champion of France 5 times.

== See also ==
- List of Olympic medalists in water polo (men)
