= Désiré Mérchez =

French swimmer (1882–1968)

Personal information
- Born: August 16, 1882 Lille, France
- Died: July 8, 1968 (aged 85) Nice, France

Sport
- Sport: Swimming
Medal record
Representing France
Olympic Games
Men's Swimming
Bronze medal – third place	1900 Paris	Team 200 metre
Men's Water polo
Bronze medal – third place	1900 Paris	Team

Désiré Alfred Mérchez (16 August 1882 – 8 July 1968) was a male French swimmer and water polo player who competed in the 1900 Summer Olympics. He was born in Lille and died in Nice.

In 1900 he won the bronze medal with the French team in the 200 metre team swimming. He also participated in the 1000 metre freestyle event but was eliminated in the first round.

As a member of the French water polo team Pupilles de Neptune de Lille #2 he won a second bronze medal at the same Olympics.
