= Georges Leuillieux =

French swimmer and water polo player

Personal information
- Full name: Georges Robert Félix Constant Leuillieux
- Born: 3 August 1879 Lille, France
- Died: 1 May 1950 (aged 70) Eu, France

Sport
- Sport: Swimming, water polo
- Club: Pupilles de Neptune de Lille
Medal record
Representing France
Olympic Games
Swimming
Bronze medal – third place	1900 Paris	200 m team

Georges Robert Félix Constant Leuillieux (3 August 1879 – 1 May 1950) was a French freestyle swimmer and water polo player. He competed at the 1900 Summer Olympics in water polo and four swimming events. He won a bronze medal in the 200 m team swimming and finished sixth in the 1000 m freestyle events.
