= Louis Martin (swimmer) =

French water polo player and swimmer

Personal information
- Born: 1875

Sport
- Sport: Swimming, water polo
- Club: Pupilles de Neptune de Lille
Medal record
Representing France
Olympic Games
Swimming
Bronze medal – third place	1900 Paris	4000 m freestyle
Bronze medal – third place	1900 Paris	200 m team
Water polo
Bronze medal – third place	1900 Paris	Team competition

Louis Martin (born 1875, date of death unknown) was a French water polo player and freestyle swimmer. He won three bronze medals at the 1900 Summer Olympics, in water polo, 4000 m freestyle and 200 m team swimming, and finished ninth and fifth in the 200 m and 1000 m freestyle swimming events, respectively.

== See also ==
- List of Olympic medalists in swimming (men)
- List of Olympic medalists in water polo (men)
