= Victor Hochepied =

French swimmer (1883–1966)

Personal information
- Full name: Victor Fernand Hochepied
- Born: 29 October 1883 Lille, France
- Died: 26 March 1966 (aged 82) Lille, France

Sport
- Sport: Swimming, water polo
- Club: Triton Lillois
Medal record
Representing France
Olympic Games
Silver medal – second place	1900 Paris	200 m team

Victor Fernand Hochepied (29 October 1883 – 26 March 1966) was a French freestyle swimmer who competed in the 1900 Summer Olympics.

In 1900 he won the silver medal with the French team in the 200 metre team swimming, alongside his brother, Maurice Hochepied. He also participated in the 200 metre freestyle competition and in the 200 metre obstacle event but was eliminated in the first round in both.
