= Joseph Bertrand (swimmer) =

French water polo player and swimmer

Personal information
- Born: 1879

Sport
- Sport: Swimming, water polo
- Club: Tritons Lillois
Medal record
Men's Swimming
Representing France
Olympic Games
Silver medal – second place	1900 Paris	200m team

Joseph Bertrand (13 July 1877 - 25 August 1918) was a French swimmer and water polo player who won a silver medal in the Men's 200 metre team swimming event at the 1900 Summer Olympics. He also participated in water polo at the 1900 Summer Olympics.
