= Victor Cadet =

French swimmer (1878–1911)

Personal information
- Full name: Victor Antoine Jules Cadet
- Born: 17 June 1878 Saint-Omer, France
- Died: 22 September 1911 (aged 33) Lille, France

Sport
- Sport: Swimming, water polo
- Club: Triton Lillois
Medal record
Representing France
Olympic Games
Swimming
Silver medal – second place	1900 Paris	200 m team

Victor Antoine Jules Cadet (17 June 1878 – 22 September 1911) was a French water polo player and freestyle swimmer. He competed at the 1900 Summer Olympics in water polo and two swimming events and won a silver medal in the 200 m team swimming.
