= Philippe Houben =

French swimmer

Personal information
- Full name: Philippe Jean Louis Houben
- Nationality: Belgian / French
- Born: 4 June 1881 Brussels, Belgium

Sport
- Sport: Water polo

Senior clubs
- Years: Team
- –: Pupilles de Neptune de Lille
National team
- Years: Team
- ?-?: France

Philippe Jean Louis Houben (born 4 June 1881, date of death unknown) was a Belgian-born naturalized French (in 1939) male water polo player. He was a member of the Belgium men's national water polo team. He competed with the team at the 1900 Summer Olympics.
