= René Tartara =

French swimmer and water polo player

Personal information
- Full name: René Pierre Charles Tartara
- Born: 14 November 1881 Lille, France
- Died: 3 September 1922 (aged 40) Haiphong, French Indochina

Sport
- Sport: Swimming, water polo
- Club: Pupilles de Neptune de Lille
Medal record
Representing France
Olympic Games
Swimming
Bronze medal – third place	1900 Paris	200 m team

René Pierre Charles Tartara (14 November 1881 – 3 September 1922) was a French freestyle swimmer and water polo player. He competed at the 1900 Summer Olympics in water polo and two swimming events, and won a bronze medal in the 200 m team swimming.
