= Zoltán Halmay =

Hungarian swimmer (1881–1956)

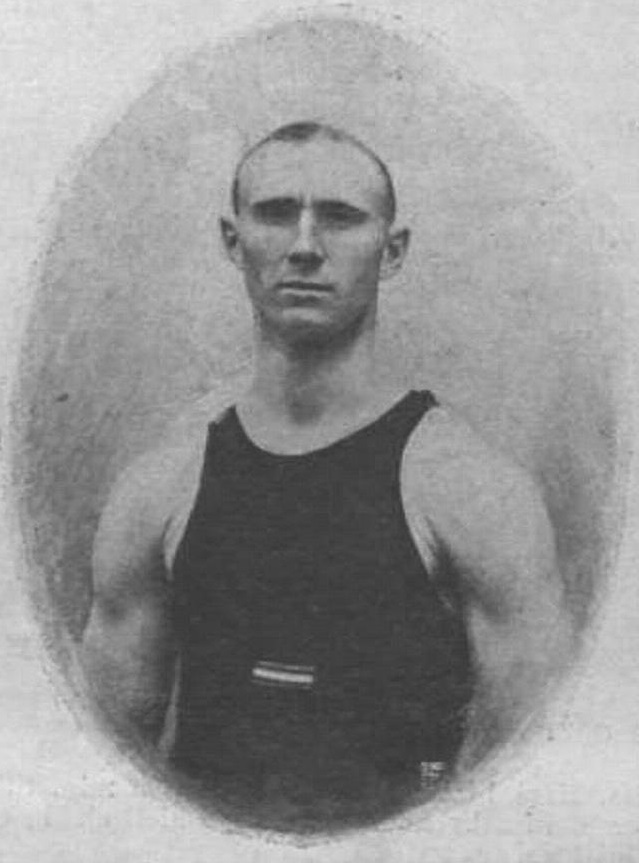
- Halmay in 1905

Personal information
- Born: 18 June 1881 Magasfalu, Hungary
- Died: 20 May 1956 (aged 74) Budapest, Hungary

Sport
- Sport: Swimming
Medal record
Representing Kingdom of Hungary
Olympic Games
Gold medal – first place	1904 St. Louis	50 yd freestyle
Gold medal – first place	1904 St. Louis	100 yd freestyle
Silver medal – second place	1900 Paris	200 m freestyle
Silver medal – second place	1900 Paris	4000 m freestyle
Silver medal – second place	1908 London	100 m freestyle
Silver medal – second place	1908 London	4×200 m freestyle relay
Bronze medal – third place	1900 Paris	1000 m freestyle
Intercalated Games
Gold medal – first place	1906 Athens	4×250 m freestyle relay
Silver medal – second place	1906 Athens	100 m freestyle

Zoltán Imre Ödön Halmay de Erdőtelek (Hungarian pronunciation: [ˈzoltaːn ˈhɒlmɒi]; 18 June 1881 – 20 May 1956) was a Hungarian Olympic swimmer. He competed in four Olympics (1900 – 1908), winning the following medals:

- 1900: silver (200 m, 4000 m freestyle), bronze (1000 m freestyle)
- 1904: gold (50yd, 100yd freestyle)
- 1906: gold (4×250 m freestyle relay), silver (100 m freestyle) (these games are now not officially recognized by the IOC)
- 1908: silver (100 m freestyle; 4 × 200 m freestyle relay)

Zoltán Halmay, who was a two-time Olympic champion, was the most successful sportsman in freestyle swimming. In 1904 he won the 50 and 100 yards at the St. Louis Games and in 1906 he was a member of the 4×250 m relay team that won the gold medal at the Intercalated Games. He won a further 4 silver medals and a bronze medal at other Olympics. He was Hungarian champion 14 times and won the English, the German and the Austrian Championships as well. He was a world record holder at 100 metres and also at 50 and 220 yards. His versatility is shown by the fact that he was also a remarkable athlete, rower and football player, and he also won a national-level championship in roller-skating over 5000 metres. After his retirement, he worked as a trainer, and he was the federal chief trainer of the Hungarian Swimming Association. At the ceremony organised at the main square of the village, a monument unifying the memorial plaque and the statue of Halmay was set up in collaboration with the Slovak Olympic Committee and the local government of Vysoká pri Morave (Magasfalu).

== See also ==
- List of members of the International Swimming Hall of Fame
- World record progression 100 metres freestyle
- World record progression 200 metres freestyle

Records
Preceded by –	Men's 100 metre freestyle world record holder (long course); 3 December 1905 – 20 July 1908	Succeeded by Charles Daniels
Preceded by Frederick Lane	Men's 200 metre freestyle world record holder (long course); 28 June 1908 – 11 November 1908	Succeeded by Otto Scheff
