= Jules Verbecke =

French swimmer and water polo player

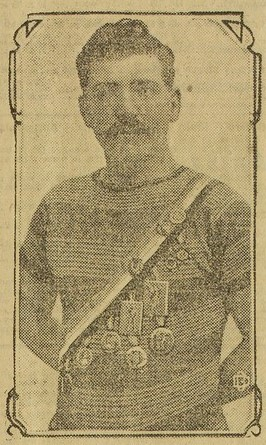

Personal information
- Full name: Jules Louis Verbecke
- Born: 15 September 1879 Lille, France

Sport
- Sport: Swimming, water polo
- Club: Tritons Lillois
Medal record
Men's Swimming
Representing France
Olympic Games
| Silver medal – second place | 1900 Paris | 200m team |

Jules Louis Verbecke (born September 15, 1879, date of death unknown) was a French swimmer and water polo player who won a silver medal in the Men's 200 meter team swimming event at the 1900 Summer Olympics. He also participated in the Water polo at the 1900 Summer Olympics.
