= Maurice Hochepied =

French swimmer (1881–1960)

Personal information
- Full name: Maurice Louis Hochepied
- Born: 9 October 1881 Lille, France
- Died: 22 March 1960 (aged 78) Lille, France

Sport
- Sport: Swimming, water polo
- Club: Triton Lillois
Medal record
Representing France
Olympic Games
Silver medal – second place	1900 Paris	200 m team

Maurice Louis Hochepied (9 October 1881 – 22 March 1960) was a French water polo player and freestyle swimmer. He competed at the 1900 Summer Olympics in five events and won a silver medal in the 200 m team swimming, alongside his brother, Victor Hochepied.
