= List of flag bearers for Bolivia at the Olympics =

Bolivia at the Olympics
- IOC code: BOL
- NOC: Bolivian Olympic Committee
- Website: www.cobol.org.bo (in Spanish)
- Medals: Gold 0 Silver 0 Bronze 0 Total 0

Summer appearances
- 1936; 1948–1960; 1964; 1968; 1972; 1976; 1980; 1984; 1988; 1992; 1996; 2000; 2004; 2008; 2012; 2016; 2020; 2024

Winter appearances
- 1956; 1960–1976; 1980; 1984; 1988; 1992; 1994–2014; 2018; 2022; 2026

This is a list of flag bearers who have represented Bolivia at the Olympics.

Flag bearers carry the national flag of their country at the opening ceremony of the Olympic Games.

| # | Event year | Season | Flag bearer | Sport |
|---|---|---|---|---|
| 1 | 1936 | Summer | Alberto Conrad | Swimming |
| 2 | 1956 | Winter | René Farwig | Alpine skiing |
| 3 | 1964 | Summer | Fernando Inchauste | Canoeing |
| 4 | 1972 | Summer | Roberto Nielsen-Reyes | Equestrian |
| 5 | 1980 | Winter | Billy Farwig | Alpine skiing |
| 6 | 1988 | Winter | Guillermo Avila | Alpine skiing |
| 7 | 1988 | Summer | Katerine Moreno | Swimming |
| 8 | 1992 | Winter | Guillermo Avila | Alpine skiing |
| 9 | 1996 | Summer | Policarpio Calizaya | Athletics |
| 10 | 2000 | Summer | Marco Condori | Athletics |
| 11 | 2004 | Summer | Geovanna Irusta | Athletics |
| 12 | 2008 | Summer | César Menacho | Shooting |
| 13 | 2012 | Summer | Karen Torrez | Swimming |
| 14 | 2016 | Summer | Ángela Castro | Athletics |
| 15 | 2020 | Summer | Gabriel Castillo | Swimming |
| 15 | 2020 | Summer | Karen Torrez | Swimming |
| 16 | 2022 | Winter | Simon Breitfuss Kammerlander | Alpine skiing |
| 17 | 2024 | Summer | Héctor Garibay | Athletics |
| 17 | 2024 | Summer | María José Ribera | Swimming |

== See also ==
- Bolivia at the Olympics
