= Bolivia at the 1972 Summer Olympics =

- IOC code: BOL
- NOC: Bolivian Olympic Committee

in Munich
- Competitors: 11 (11 men and 0 women) in 3 sports
- Flag bearer: Roberto Nielsen-Reyes (Equestrian)
- Medals: Gold 0 Silver 0 Bronze 0 Total 0

Summer Olympics appearances (overview)
- 1936; 1948–1960; 1964; 1968; 1972; 1976; 1980; 1984; 1988; 1992; 1996; 2000; 2004; 2008; 2012; 2016; 2020; 2024

Bolivia competed at the 1972 Summer Olympics in Munich, West Germany. Eleven competitors, all men, took part in nine events in three sports.

== Athletics ==
Men's 100 metres

- Lionel Caero
  - First Heat – 11.19s (→ did not advance)

Men's Marathon

- Ricardo Condori
  - Final – 2:56:11 (→ 58th place)
- Crispín Quispe
  - Final – 3:07:22 (→ 61st place)
- Juvenal Rocha
  - Final – did not finish (→ no ranking)

== Equestrianism ==
- Roberto Nielsen-Reyes

== Shooting ==
Six male shooters represented Bolivia in 1972.

50 m pistol

- Jaime Sánchez

50 m rifle, prone

- Fernando Inchauste
- Eduardo Arroyo

Trap

- Armando Salvietti
- Ricardo Roberts

Skeet

- Carlos Asbun
- Armando Salvietti
