= Bolivia at the 1988 Summer Olympics =

- IOC code: BOL
- NOC: Bolivian Olympic Committee

in Seoul
- Competitors: 7 (6 men and 1 woman) in 6 sports
- Flag bearer: Katerine Moreno
- Medals: Gold 0 Silver 0 Bronze 0 Total 0

Summer Olympics appearances (overview)
- 1936; 1948–1960; 1964; 1968; 1972; 1976; 1980; 1984; 1988; 1992; 1996; 2000; 2004; 2008; 2012; 2016; 2020; 2024; 2028

Bolivia was represented at the 1988 Summer Olympics in Seoul, South Korea by the Bolivian Olympic Committee.

In total, seven athletes including six men and one woman represented Bolivia in six different sports including athletics, cycling, fencing, judo, swimming and weightlifting.

== Competitors ==
In total, seven athletes represented Bolivia at the 1988 Summer Olympics in Seoul, South Korea across six different sports.

Sport	Men	Women	Total
Athletics	2	0	2
Cycling	1	0	1
Fencing	1	0	1
Judo	1	–	1
Swimming	0	1	1
Weightlifting	1	–	1
Total	6	1	7

== Athletics ==
In total, two Bolivian athletes participated in the athletics events – Policarpio Calizaya in the men's 10,000 m and Juan Camacho in the men's marathon.

The heats for the men's 10,000 m took place on 23 September 1988. Calizaya finished 10th in his heat in a time of 30 minutes 35.01 seconds and he did not advance to the finals.

The men's marathon took place on 2 October 1988. Camacho completed the course in two hours 34 minutes 41 seconds to finish 69th overall.

Athlete	Event	Heat Round 1		Heat Round 2		Semifinal		Final	
Athlete	Event	Time	Rank	Time	Rank	Time	Rank	Time	Rank
Policarpio Calizaya	10,000 metres	30:35.01	36	—N/a				Did not advance	
Juan Camacho	Marathon	—N/a						2:34:41	69

== Cycling ==
In total, one Bolivian athlete participated in the cycling events – Bailón Becerra in the men's sprint, the men's 10 km time trial and the men's points race.

The qualifying round of the men's sprint took place on 21 September 1988. Becerra recorded a time of 12.216 seconds and was ranked 24th. The first round took place later the same day. Becerra finished third in his race and transferred to the repechage. The first round of the repechage took place later the same day. Becerra finished third in his race and was eliminated from the competition.

Athlete	Event	Qualification		Round 1	Repechage 1	Round 2	Repechage 2	Quarterfinals	Semifinals	Final	
Athlete	Event	Time Speed (km/h)	Rank	Opposition Time Speed (km/h)	Opposition Time Speed (km/h)	Opposition Time Speed (km/h)	Opposition Time Speed (km/h)	Opposition Time Speed (km/h)	Opposition Time Speed (km/h)	Opposition Time Speed (km/h)	Rank
Bailón Becerra	Sprint	12.216	24 Q	Alexander (GBR), Moreno (ESP); L	Weber (FRG), Pons (ECU), Abrams (GUY); L	Did not advance					

The men's 1 km time trial took place on 20 September 1988. Becerra completed the course in a time of one minute 13.513 seconds to finish 29th overall.

Athlete	Event	Time	Rank
Bailón Becerra	Time trial	1:13.513	29

The first round of the men's points race took place on 21 September 1999. Becerra did not finish.

Athlete	Event	Qualification			Final		
Athlete	Event	Laps	Points	Rank	Laps	Points	Rank
Bailón Becerra	Points race	DNF			Did not advance		

== Fencing ==
In total, one Bolivian athlete participated in the fencing events – Pedro Bleyer in the men's sabre.

The first round of the men's sabre took place on 22 September 1988. Bleyer lost all six of his pool bouts against Andrey Alshan of the Soviet Union, György Nébald of Hungary, Janusz Olech of Poland, Peter Westbrook of the United States, Antonio García of Spain and Kim Sang-wook of South Korea.

Athlete	Event	Group Stage 1							Group Stage 2						Group Stage 3					
Athlete	Event	Opposition Result	Opposition Result	Opposition Result	Opposition Result	Opposition Result	Opposition Result	Rank	Opposition Result	Opposition Result	Opposition Result	Opposition Result	Opposition Result	Rank	Opposition Result	Opposition Result	Opposition Result	Opposition Result	Opposition Result	Rank
Pedro Bleyer	Men's sabre	Alshan (URS); L 2–5	Nébald (HUN); L 3–5	Olech (POL); L 1–5	Westbrook (USA); L 1–5	García (ESP); L 0–5	Kim (KOR); L 2–5	7	Did not advance											

== Judo ==
In total, one Bolivian athlete participated in the judo events – Ricardo Belmonte in the men's –60 kg.

The men's −60 kg category took place on 25 September 1988. Belmonte received a bye in the first round. In the second round, he lost by ippon to Sheu Tsay-chwan of Chinese Taipei.

Athlete	Event	Round of 64	Round of 32	Round of 16	Quarterfinals	Semifinals	Repechage			Final	
Athlete	Event	Round of 64	Round of 32	Round of 16	Quarterfinals	Semifinals	Round 1	Round 2	Round 3	Final	
Athlete	Event	Opposition Result	Opposition Result	Opposition Result	Opposition Result	Opposition Result	Opposition Result	Opposition Result	Opposition Result	Opposition Result	Rank
Ricardo Belmonte	–60 kg	Bye	Sheu (TPE); L Ippon	Did not advance							

== Swimming ==
In total, one Bolivian athletes participated in the swimming events – Katerine Moreno in the women's 50 m freestyle, the women's 100 m freestyle, the women's 100 m backstroke and the women's 100 m breaststroke.

The heats for the women's 100 m freestyle took place on 18 September 1988. Moreno finished second in her heat in a time of one minute 5.39 seconds which was ultimately not fast enough to advance to the finals.

The heats for the women's 100 m backstroke took place on 22 September 1988. Moreno finished second in her heat in a time of one minute 14.42 seconds which was ultimately not fast enough to advance to the finals.

The heats for the women's 100 m breaststroke took place on 23 September 1988. Moreno finished second in her heat in a time of one minute 22.62 seconds which was ultimately not fast enough to advance to the finals.

The heats for the women's 50 m freestyle took place on 25 September 1988. Moreno finished eighth in her heat in a time of 29.42 seconds which was ultimately not fast enough to advance to the finals.

Athlete	Event	Heats		Final A/B	
Athlete	Event	Time	Rank	Time	Rank
Katerine Moreno	50 m freestyle	29.42	46	Did not advance	
Katerine Moreno	100 m freestyle	1:05.39	54	Did not advance	
Katerine Moreno	100 m backstroke	1:14.42	38	Did not advance	
Katerine Moreno	100 m breaststroke	1:22.62	40	Did not advance	

== Weightlifting ==
In total, one Bolivian athlete participated in the weightlifting events – Hernán Cortez in the –90 kg category.

The −90 kg category took place on 25 September 1988. Cortez lifted 110 kg (snatch) and 140 kg (clean and jerk) for a combined score of 250 kg which placed him 23rd in the overall rankings.

Athlete	Event	Snatch		Clean & jerk		Total	Rank
Athlete	Event	Result	Rank	Result	Rank	Total	Rank
Hernán Cortez	–90 kg	110.0	24	140.0	23	250.0	23
