= Bolivia at the 1992 Summer Olympics =

- IOC code: BOL
- NOC: Bolivian Olympic Committee

in Barcelona
- Competitors: 13 (8 men, 5 women) in 6 sports
- Medals: Gold 0 Silver 0 Bronze 0 Total 0

Summer Olympics appearances (overview)
- 1936; 1948–1960; 1964; 1968; 1972; 1976; 1980; 1984; 1988; 1992; 1996; 2000; 2004; 2008; 2012; 2016; 2020; 2024

Bolivia competed at the 1992 Summer Olympics in Barcelona, Spain. Thirteen competitors, eight men and five women, took part in eighteen events in six sports.

== Competitors ==
The following is the list of number of competitors in the Games.

Sport	Men	Women	Total
Athletics	2	4	6
Cycling	1	0	1
Judo	2	0	2
Shooting	1	0	1
Swimming	1	1	2
Weightlifting	1	–	1
Total	8	5	13

== Athletics ==
Men
Track and road events

Athlete	Event	Heats		Quarterfinal		Semifinal		Final	
Athlete	Event	Result	Rank	Result	Rank	Result	Rank	Result	Rank
Policarpio Calizaya	5000 metres	15:02.02	49	—		Did not advance			
Policarpio Calizaya	10,000 metres	30:27.01	45	—				Did not advance	
Juan Camacho	Marathon	—						2:26:01	57

Women
Track and road events

Athlete	Event	Heats		Quarterfinal		Semifinal		Final	
Athlete	Event	Result	Rank	Result	Rank	Result	Rank	Result	Rank
Jacqueline Soliz	200 metres	DQ		Did not advance					
Jacqueline Soliz	400 metres	56.78	39	Did not advance					
Jacqueline Soliz; Sandra Antelo; Gloria Burgos; Moré Galetovic	4 × 400 metres relay	3:53.65	13	—				Did not advance	

== Cycling ==
One male cyclists represented Bolivia in 1992.

=== Track ===
Sprint

Athlete	Event	Qualification		Round 1	Repechage		Round 2	Repechage 2	Quarterfinals	Semifinals	Final	
Athlete	Event	Qualification		Round 1	Round 1	Round 2	Round 2	Repechage 2	Quarterfinals	Semifinals	Final	
Athlete	Event	Time Speed (km/h)	Rank	Opposition Time Speed (km/h)	Opposition Time Speed (km/h)	Opposition Time Speed (km/h)	Opposition Time Speed (km/h)	Opposition Time Speed (km/h)	Opposition Time Speed (km/h)	Opposition Time Speed (km/h)	Opposition Time Speed (km/h)	Rank
Pedro Vaca	Men's sprint	12.243	23	Did not advance								

Time trial

Athlete	Event	Time	Rank
Pedro Vaca	Time trial	1:14.475	30

== Judo ==
Men

Athlete	Event	Round of 64	Round of 32	Round of 16	Quarterfinals	Semifinals	Repechage			Final	
Athlete	Event	Round of 64	Round of 32	Round of 16	Quarterfinals	Semifinals	Round 1	Round 2	Round 3	Final	
Athlete	Event	Opposition Result	Opposition Result	Opposition Result	Opposition Result	Opposition Result	Opposition Result	Opposition Result	Opposition Result	Opposition Result	Rank
Carlos Noriega	60 kg	Bye	Efemgil (TUR); L	Did not advance							
Eric Bustos	78 kg	Bye	Katsinioridis (CYP); L	Did not advance							

== Shooting ==
Open

Athlete	Event	Qualification		Final	
Athlete	Event	Points	Rank	Points	Rank
Luis Gamarra	Skeet	143	42	Did not advance	

== Swimming ==
Men

Athlete	Event	Heats		Final A/B	
Athlete	Event	Time	Rank	Time	Rank
Luis Medina	200 metre freestyle	2:00.87	46	Did not advance	
Luis Medina	400 metre freestyle	4:11.77	41	Did not advance	
Luis Medina	100 metre butterfly	1:01.14	63	Did not advance	

Women

Athlete	Event	Heats		Final A/B	
Athlete	Event	Time	Rank	Time	Rank
Paola Peñarrieta	50 metre freestyle	29.71	48	Did not advance	
Paola Peñarrieta	100 metre freestyle	1:04.08	47	Did not advance	
Paola Peñarrieta	200 metre freestyle	2:15.74	37	Did not advance	

== Weightlifting ==
Athlete	Event	Snatch		Clean & jerk		Total	Rank
Athlete	Event	Result	Rank	Result	Rank	Total	Rank
Casiano Tejeda	90 kg	127.5	20	157.5	20	285.0	20

== See also ==
- Bolivia at the 1991 Pan American Games
