= List of Bolivian records in swimming =

The Bolivian Records in swimming are the fastest times ever swum by an individual from Bolivia. These records are maintained by Bolivia's national swimming federation: la Federación Boliviana de Natación (FEBONA).

FEBONA keeps records for both for men (varones) and women (damas), for events in long course (50m, Piscina Larga) and short course (25m, Piscina Corta) courses. Records are kept in the following events (by stroke):

- freestyle (libre): 50, 100, 200, 400, 800 and 1500;
- backstroke (espalda): 50, 100 and 200;
- breaststroke (pecho): 50, 100 and 200;
- butterfly (mariposa): 50, 100 and 200;
- individual medley (combinado): 100 (25m only), 200 and 400;
- relays: 4x50 free, 4x100 free, 4x200 free, 4x50 medley, and 4 × 100 medley.

== Long course (50m) ==
=== Men ===
Event	Time		Name	Club	Date	Meet	Location	Ref
50 m freestyle	23.13		José Quintanilla	Santa Cruz	14 March 2018	Bolivian Championships	Cochabamba, Bolivia	
100 m freestyle	52.18	h	Yatsen Soza	Bolivia	16 April 2026	South American Youth Games	Panama City, Panama	
200 m freestyle	1:55.93		Yatsen Soza	Bolivia	24 November 2025	Bolivarian Games	Lima, Peru	
400 m freestyle	4:10.41	h	Remington Angerer	Bolivia	19 April 2026	South American Youth Games	Panama City, Panama	
800 m freestyle	8:40.12		Luis Medina	-	1990	-	Lima, Peru	
1500 m freestyle	16:38.17		Rodrigo Caballero	Bolivia	21 January 2019	Bolivian Club Championships	Cochabamba, Bolivia	
50 m backstroke	26.43		Gabriel Castillo	Bolivia	19 December 2020	Paraguayan Open Championships	Asunción, Paraguay	
100 m backstroke	57.30	h	Gabriel Castillo	Bolivia	27 May 2021	Grand Prix SYC	Asunción, Paraguay	
200 m backstroke	2:09.57		Remington Angerer	Auburn Aquatics	28 June 2026	Richard Quick Invitational	Auburn, United States	
50 m breaststroke	28.91		Santiago Cavanagh	Santa Cruz	5 July 2018	Bolivian Club Championships	Cochabamba, Bolivia	
100 m breaststroke	1:03.41	h	Esteban Nuñez	Bolivia	19 June 2024	Spanish Championships	Palma de Mallorca, Spain	
200 m breaststroke	2:18.79	=	Remington Angerer	Auburn Aquatics	27 June 2026	Richard Quick Invitational	Auburn, United States	
200 m breaststroke	2:18.79	c, =, #	Remington Angerer	Auburn Aquatics	31 July 2026	Futures Championships	Austin, United States	
200 m breaststroke	2:16.92	#	Remington Angerer	Bolivia	2 November 2026	Youth Olympic Games	Dakar, Senegal	
50m butterfly	24.87	†	Jose Quintanilla	Samix Santa Cruz	3 April 2021	Bolivian Championships	Trinidad, Bolivia	
50m butterfly	24.85	not ratified	Esteban Nuñez	Bolivia	11 May 2024	Grand Prix Pardubice	Pardubice, Czech Republic	
100m butterfly	54.13		Esteban Nuñez	CN Antibes	5 May 2024 (Note: by official results source; 3 May 2024 by FEBONA source, a typo)	Gones Open	Lyon, France	
200m butterfly	2:09.36		Augustin Gongora	SPMSC	24 March 2023	Selectivo Nacional		
200m individual medley	2:04.56		Esteban Nuñez	Bolivia	12 May 2024 (Note: by official results source; 10 May 2024 by FEBONA source, a typo)	Grand Prix Pardubice	Pardubice, Czech Republic	
400m individual medley	4:34.32		Remington Angerer	Auburn Aquatics	27 June 2026	Richard Quick Invitational	Auburn, United States	
400m individual medley	4:33.62	not ratified	Remington Angerer	Auburn Aquatics	27 April 2025	Jimi Flowers Spring Splash	Auburn, United States	
400m individual medley	4:29.50	#	Remington Angerer	Auburn Aquatics	30 July 2026	Futures Championships	Austin, United States	
4x50m freestyle relay	1:38.92		P. Ribera; M. Daza; Y. Soza; Aldo Castillo	Medley Santa Cruz	14 September 2022	Bolivian Club Championships	Santa Cruz, Bolivia	
4x100m freestyle relay	3:36.39		José Quintanilla (54.48); Aldo Castillo (54.77); Fabian Quiroga (55.00); Esteban Nuñez (52.14)	Bolivia	4 October 2022	South American Games	Asunción, Paraguay	
4x200m freestyle relay	8:16.11		Esteban Nuñez; Sebastian Cariaga; Gabriel Castillo; Aldo Castillo	Medley Santa Cruz	14 February 2020	Bolivian Club Championships	Santa Cruz, Bolivia	
4x50m medley relay	1:48.00		R. Santiestevan; J. Cabrera; Aldo Castillo	Santa Cruz	18 October 2017	-	Lima, Peru	
4x100m medley relay	3:58.85		Rafael Montaño (1:00.92); Santiago Cavanagh (1:07.33); Aldo Castillo (57.13); Ivan Soruco (53.77)	Bolivia	29 May 2018	South American Games	Cochabamba, Bolivia	

Legend: # – Record awaiting ratification by FEBONA; e – equalled existing record;
Records not set in finals: h – heat; sf – semifinal; r – relay 1st leg; rh – relay heat 1st leg; b – B final; † – en route to final mark; so – swim-off; tt – time trial

=== Women ===
Event	Time		Name	Club	Date	Meet	Location	Ref
50m freestyle	25.00		Karen Torrez	Bolivia	22 November 2017	Bolivarian Games	Santa Marta, Colombia	
100m freestyle	56.14		Karen Torrez	Bolivia	21 November 2017	Bolivarian Games	Santa Marta, Colombia	
200m freestyle	2:05.74		Karen Torrez	C.N. Barcelona	22 July 2014	Catalonian Open Junior Championships	Mataró, Spain	
400m freestyle	4:31.88		Karen Torrez	Bolivia	17 April 2016	Danish Open	Copenhagen, Denmark	
800m freestyle	9:25.62		Karen Torrez	LA Paz	24 April 2019	Bolivian Championships	Clausura, Bolivia	
1500m freestyle	18:19.70		Tayra Seoane	Unattached	18 July 2026	Bolivian Club Championships	Clausura, Bolivia	
50m backstroke	30.87		Maria Jose Ribera	Medley Santa Cruz	13 July 2022	Bolivian Club Championships	Cochabamba, Bolivia	
100m backstroke	1:07.90	h	Karen Torrez	Bolivia	27 July 2009	World Championships	Rome, Italy	
200m backstroke	2:26.63		Mariana Zavalla	Santa Cruz	20 May 2011	Bolivian Championships	Santa Cruz, Bolivia	
50m breaststroke	33.06		Maria Jose Ribera	Bolivia	3 March 2024	Bolivian Championships		
100m breaststroke	1:14.31		Naiara Roca	Bolivia	16 September 2023	South American Junior Championships	Santo Tomé, Argentina	
200m breaststroke	2:44.28		Naiara Roca	Bolivia	7 November 2024	XLII Pacific Cup		
200m breaststroke	2:35.86	ratified, but later rescinded	Katerine Moreno	Bolivia	January 1989	Bolivarian Games	Maracaibo, Venezuela	
50m butterfly	27.37		Maria Jose Ribera	Bolivia	3 March 2024	Bolivian Championships		
100m butterfly	1:00.96		Karen Torrez	Bolivia	27 May 2018	South American Games	Cochabamba, Bolivia	
200m butterfly	2:23.23		Alexis Margett	Bolivia	9 November 2018	South American Championships	Trujillo, Peru	
200m individual medley	2:26.60		Alexis Margett	Santa Cruz	23 April 2019	Bolivian Championships	Cochabamba, Bolivia	
400m individual medley	5:24.01		Karen Torrez	Hipico LA Paz	22 February 2019	Bolivian Club Championships	Cochabamba, Bolivia	
4x50m freestyle relay	1:48.58		V. Espinoza; Camila Meneses; Estela Duran	Medley Santa Cruz	14 September 2022	Bolivian Club Championships	Santa Cruz, Bolivia	
4x100m freestyle relay	3:58.97		Camila Meneses; Estela Duran; Adriana Giles; María José Ribera	Medley Santa Cruz	14 September 2022	Bolivian Club Championships	Santa Cruz, Bolivia	
4x200m freestyle relay	9:07.25		Karen Torrez (2:10.92); Valentina Aloisio; Mikaela Daza; Camila Mercado (2:16.04)	Bolivia	27 May 2018	South American Games	Cochabamba, Bolivia	
4x50m medley relay	2:03.30		María José Ribera; Naiara Roca; Adriana Giles; Estela Duran	Medley Santa Cruz	14 September 2022	Bolivian Club Championships	Santa Cruz, Bolivia	
4x100m medley relay	4:29.72		A. Ovando; Naiara Roca; Adriana Giles; Camila Meneses	Medley Santa Cruz	14 September 2022	Bolivian Club Championships	Santa Cruz, Bolivia	

Legend: # – Record awaiting ratification by FEBONA; WR – World record; AM – Americas record; e – equalled existing record;
Records not set in finals: h – heat; sf – semifinal; r – relay 1st leg; rh – relay heat 1st leg; b – B final; † – en route to final mark; so – swim-off; tt – time trial

=== Mixed relay ===
Event	Time	Name	Club	Date	Meet	Location	Ref
4×50 m freestyle relay	1:44.66	Aldo Castillo; Adriana Giles; Maria Jose Ribera; Ivan Bernal	Medley Santa Cruz	12 July 2023			
4×100 m freestyle relay	3:45.07	P. Ribera; Maria Jose Ribera; Adriana Giles; Aldo Castillo	Medley Santa Cruz	14 September 2022	Bolivian Club Championships	Santa Cruz, Bolivia	
4×50 m medley relay	1:54.96	Aldo Castillo; Ivan Bernal; Maria Jose Ribera	Medley Santa Cruz	12 July 2023			
4×100 m medley relay	4:11.30	Aldo Castillo; Naiara Roca; M. Aima; Maria Jose Ribera	Medley Santa Cruz	14 September 2022	Bolivian Club Championships	Santa Cruz, Bolivia	

Legend: # – Record awaiting ratification by FEBONA; WR – World record; AM – Americas record; e – equalled existing record;
Records not set in finals: h – heat; so – swim-off

== Short course (25m) ==
=== Men ===
Event	Time		Name	Club	Date	Meet	Location	Ref
50m freestyle	22.43		José Alberto Quintanilla	Santa Cruz	26 October 2016	Bolivian Championships	Santa Cruz, Bolivia	
100m freestyle	50.47		José Alberto Quintanilla	Santa Cruz	28 November 2018	Bolivian Championships	Santa Cruz, Bolivia	
200m freestyle	1:51.37		José Alberto Quintanilla	Santa Cruz	26 May 2022	Bolivian Club Meet	Santa Cruz, Bolivia	
400m freestyle	4:02.53		Yatsen Soza	Medley Santa Cruz	28 February 2024	Bolivian Club Championships	Santa Cruz, Bolivia	
800m freestyle	8:38.61		Yatsen Soza	Medley Santa Cruz	2 March 2024	Bolivian Club Championships	Santa Cruz, Bolivia	
800m freestyle	8:32.87	h, †, not ratified	Walter Caballero Quilla	Bolivia	10 December 2016	World Championships	Windsor, Canada	
1500m freestyle	16:10.91	h	Walter Caballero Quilla	Bolivia	10 December 2016	World Championships	Windsor, Canada	
50m backstroke	25.14		Gabriel Castillo	Santa Cruz	26 November 2018	Bolivian Championships	Santa Cruz, Bolivia	
100m backstroke	55.28		Gabriel Castillo	Santa Cruz	27 November 2018	Bolivian Championships	Santa Cruz, Bolivia	
200m backstroke	2:01.61		Sebastian Cariaga	Mount Allison Mounties	25 February 2024	Subway AUS Championships	Halifax, Canada	
50m breaststroke	27.32		Santiago Cavanagh	Santa Cruz	14 December 2017	Bolivian Championships	Santa Cruz, Bolivia	
100m breaststroke	1:00.53		Santiago Cavanagh	Santa Cruz	16 December 2017	Bolivian Championships	Santa Cruz, Bolivia	
200m breaststroke	2:16.39	h	Esteban Nuñez	Bolivia	11 October 2025	World Cup	Carmel, United States	
50m butterfly	24.16		José Alberto Quintanilla	Santa Cruz	26 October 2016	Bolivian Championships	Santa Cruz, Bolivia	
100m butterfly	53.68	h	Esteban Nuñez	Bolivia	3 November 2022	World Cup	Indianapolis, United States	
100m butterfly	52.82	h, #	Esteban Nuñez	Bolivia	10 October 2025	World Cup	Carmel, United States	
200m butterfly	2:02.76		José Alberto Quintanilla	Santa Cruz	14 September 2022	Bolivian Club Championships	Santa Cruz, Bolivia	
100m individual medley	55.39		Esteban Nuñez	CN Antibes	26 November 2023	Lyon Metropole Meeting	Lyon, France	
100m individual medley	54.73	h, #	Esteban Nuñez	Bolivia	10 October 2025	World Cup	Carmel, United States	
200m individual medley	2:01.44	h	Esteban Nuñez	Bolivia	13 December 2022	World Championships	Melbourne, Australia	
200m individual medley	2:01.38	h, #	Esteban Nuñez	Bolivia	11 October 2025	World Cup	Carmel, United States	
400m individual medley	4:26.13	h	Andrew Rutherfurd	Bolivia	13 December 2012	World Championships	Istanbul, Turkey	
4x50m freestyle relay	1:35.78			Samix Santa Cruz	6 July 2016	Bolivian Club Championships League B	Santa Cruz, Bolivia	
4x100m freestyle relay	3:33.07		Rony Daher; Benjamin Kenny; Rodrigo Rodriguez; Robert Jalil	Sportmotion SC	29 February 2024	Bolivian Club Championships	Santa Cruz, Bolivia	
4x200m freestyle relay	7:49.26		Rony Daher; Wasim Daher; Robert Jalil; Agustin Gongora	Sportmotion SC	18 September 2024	Bolivian Club Championships	Santa Cruz, Bolivia	
4x50m medley relay	1:44.81			Samix Santa Cruz	6 July 2016	Bolivian Club Championships League B	Santa Cruz, Bolivia	
4x100m medley relay	3:49.36		Agustin Gongora; Jesus Cabrera; Alejandro Luizaga; Robert Jalil	Sportmotion SC	2 March 2024	Bolivian Club Championships	Santa Cruz, Bolivia	

Legend: # – Record awaiting ratification by FEBONA; e – equalled existing record;
Records not set in finals: h – heat; sf – semifinal; r – relay 1st leg; rh – relay heat 1st leg; b – B final; † – en route to final mark; so – swim-off; tt – time trial

=== Women ===
Event	Time		Name	Club	Date	Meet	Location	Ref
50 m freestyle	24.86		María José Ribera	Medley Santa Cruz	28 February 2024	Bolivian Club Championships	Santa Cruz, Bolivia	
100 m freestyle	55.25	h	Karen Torrez	Bolivia	7 December 2016	World Championships	Windsor, Canada	
200 m freestyle	2:01.03		Karen Torrez	Bolivia	6 September 2018	Copa España	Santiago, Chile	
400 m freestyle	4:20.22		Karen Torrez	C.N. Barcelona	22 November 2014	Trofeo Félix Serra Santamans	Manresa, Spain	
800 m freestyle	9:06.08	†	Karen Torrez	C.N. Barcelona	22 November 2014	Trofeo Félix Serra Santamans	Manresa, Spain	
1500 m freestyle	18:21.54		Mariana Zavalla	-	3 November 2012	Argentinian Championships	Buenos Aires, Argentina	
50 m backstroke	28.74		Maria Jose Ribera	Medley Santa Cruz	26 May 2022	Bolivian Club Meet	Santa Cruz, Bolivia	
100 m backstroke	1:05.66	h	Karen Torrez	Bolivia	15 December 2010	World Championships	Dubai, United Arab Emirates	
200 m backstroke	2:22.68		Lorie Aldana Rojas	Santa Cruz	28 February 2024	Bolivian Club Championships	Santa Cruz, Bolivia	
50m breaststroke	32.15		María José Ribera	Medley Santa Cruz	29 February 2024	Bolivian Club Championships	Santa Cruz, Bolivia	
100m breaststroke	1:12.78	h	María José Ribera	Medley Santa Cruz	1 March 2024	Bolivian Club Championships	Santa Cruz, Bolivia	
200m breaststroke	2:37.92		Alexis Margett	Sportmotion SC	21 September 2024	Bolivian Club Championships	Santa Cruz, Bolivia	
50m butterfly	26.99		Maria Jose Ribera	Medley Santa Cruz	1 March 2024	Bolivian Club Championships	Santa Cruz, Bolivia	
100m butterfly	1:00.55		Karen Torrez	Bolivia	6 September 2018	Copa España Internacional		
200m butterfly	2:24.03		Karen Torrez	La Paz	22 March 2017	Bolivian Championships	Santa Cruz, Bolivia	
100m individual medley	1:04.27	h	Karen Torrez	Bolivia	8 December 2016	World Championships	Windsor, Canada	
200m individual medley	2:21.17		Alexis Margett	Sportmotion SC	21 September 2024	Bolivian Club Championships	Santa Cruz, Bolivia	
200m individual medley	2:20.06	h, #	Alexis Margett	Bolivia	10 December 2024	World Championships	Budapest, Hungary	
400m individual medley	5:09.53		Karen Torrez	La Paz	16 December 2017	Bolivian Championships	Santa Cruz, Bolivia	
4x50m free relay	1:48.58		Valentina Espinoza; Camila Meneses; Estela Duran; Adriana Giles	Medley Santa Cruz	14 September 2022	Bolivian Club Championships	Santa Cruz, Bolivia	
4x100m free relay	3:58.97		Camila Meneses; Estela Duran; Adriana Giles; María José Ribera	Medley Santa Cruz	15 September 2022	Bolivian Club Championships	Santa Cruz, Bolivia	
4x200m free relay	8:44.69		Camila Meneses; Alexis Margett; Adriana Giles; Estela Duran	Medley Santa Cruz	15 September 2022	Bolivian Club Championships	Santa Cruz, Bolivia	
4x50m medley relay	2:03.30		María José Ribera; Naiara Roca; Adriana Giles; Estela Duran	Medley Santa Cruz	16 September 2022	Bolivian Club Championships	Santa Cruz, Bolivia	
4x100m medley relay	4:28.10		Ana Ovando; Naiara Roca; Adriana Giles; Camila Meneses	Medley Santa Cruz	2 March 2024	Bolivian Club Championships	Santa Cruz, Bolivia	

Legend: # – Record awaiting ratification by FEBONA; e – equalled existing record;
Records not set in finals: h – heat; sf – semifinal; r – relay 1st leg; rh – relay heat 1st leg; b – B final; † – en route to final mark; so – swim-off; tt – time trial

=== Mixed relay ===
Event	Time	Name	Club	Date	Meet	Location	Ref
4×100 m freestyle relay	3:45.07	Pedro Ribera; M. J. Ribera; Adriana Giles; Aldo Castillo	Medley Santa Cruz	14 September 2022	Bolivian Club Championships	Santa Cruz, Bolivia	
4×100 m medley relay	4:11.30	Aldo Castillo; Naiara Roca; Mateo Aima; M. J. Ribera	Medley Santa Cruz	15 September 2022	Bolivian Club Championships	Santa Cruz, Bolivia	

Legend: # – Record awaiting ratification by FEBONA; WR – World record; AM – Americas record; e – equalled existing record;
Records not set in finals: h – heat; so – swim-off
