= Bolivia at the 2008 Summer Olympics =

- IOC code: BOL
- NOC: Bolivian Olympic Committee
- Website: www.cobol.org.bo (in Spanish)

in Beijing
- Competitors: 7 in 5 sports
- Flag bearer: César Menacho
- Medals: Gold 0 Silver 0 Bronze 0 Total 0

Summer Olympics appearances (overview)
- 1936; 1948–1960; 1964; 1968; 1972; 1976; 1980; 1984; 1988; 1992; 1996; 2000; 2004; 2008; 2012; 2016; 2020; 2024; 2028

Bolivia sent a delegation to compete at the 2008 Summer Olympics, held in Beijing, China. The South American country's delegation was the fifteenth Summer Olympic team and seventeenth overall Olympic team overall sent by the country. Bolivia's National Olympic Committee sent seven athletes–three women and four men–across five sports and seven distinct events. A substantial number of the athletes originated in southern Bolivian cities, most notably Santa Cruz de la Sierra. All athletes except for cyclist Horacio Gallardo finished their events, although no medals were won by the country at these Games (or at any Games up to this point, summer or winter). Trap shooter César Menacho was the Bolivian flag bearer at the ceremonies.

== Competitors ==
The Bolivian delegation that traveled to Beijing consisted of the following seven athletes:

Athlete	Sport	Event
Horacio Gallardo	Cycling	Men's road race
Fadrique Iglesias	Athletics	Men's 800 metres
Sonia Calizaya	Athletics	Women's marathon
Katerine Moreno	Swimming	Women's 50 metre freestyle
Miguel Ángel Navarro	Swimming	Men's 100 metre freestyle
María Teresa Monasterio	Weightlifting	Women's 63 kg
César Menacho	Shooting	Men's trap

== Background ==
Bolivia is a landlocked, predominantly mountainous nation in central South America that is inhabited mainly by Amerindian peoples. The nation of 10 million people lies to the southwest of Brazil, to the northwest of Paraguay, to the north of Argentina and of Chile, and to the east of Peru. Bolivia was originally colonized by the Spanish, and broke away from the Spanish Empire in 1825. The nation endured a period of instability that consisted of nearly 200 coups between then and 1982, when a popularly elected democratic government came into power. The first Bolivian delegation to the Olympics appeared 46 years before the arrival of democracy in Bolivia, when two men competed at the 1936 Summer Olympics in Berlin, Nazi Germany. However, Bolivian athletes did not return to the Olympics afterwards until the 1964 Summer Olympics in Tokyo, Japan. The size of the Bolivian delegation has increased steadily since that time, and has peaked several times—most notably at the 1992 Summer Olympics in Barcelona, Spain, when 13 athletes arrived to represent their country across six sports. The first female Bolivian Olympian competed in the 1984 Summer Olympics in Los Angeles, USA. Bolivian athletes competed at fifteen Summer Olympic games (and seventeen Olympic games of any kind) by the end of the Beijing games, missing the 1948–1960 and 1980 games.

Seven athletes competed in the Beijing Olympics on Bolivia's behalf. More than half the delegation was more than 30 years old, with the eldest athlete being trap shooter César Menacho at age 43 and the youngest being 26-year-old swimmer Miguel Navarro. Four of the athletes were male and three were female, and the athletes competed across five distinct events (track and field, cycling, shooting, swimming, weightlifting). In its history up to and including Beijing's Olympic games, there has been no Bolivian athlete who has won a medal in any event. Menacho was selected as flagbearer for the ceremonies.

== Athletics ==
Fadrique Ignacio Iglesias Mendizábal competed in the men's 800 meters races at Beijing while representing Bolivia. Born in Cochabamba, a major Bolivian city in the center of the country, Iglesias was 23 years old when he competed in the same event at the 2004 Summer Olympics in Athens, Greece. During the qualification round of the men's 800 meters, which took place on August 20, Iglesias competed in the sixth heat against seven other athletes. He finished the race in 1:50.57, placing seventh in his heat. Yemen's Mohammed Al-Yafaee placed immediately behind Iglesias (1:54.82), while Canada's Achraf Tadili placed sixth (1:48.87) in a heat led by Morocco's Amine Laalou (1:47.86) and Uganda's Abraham Chepkirwok (1:47.93). Of the 58 athletes who finished the event, Fadrique Iglesias placed 53rd. He did not advance to later rounds.

Sonia Calizaya Huanca competed on Bolivia's behalf in the women's marathon, and was the only female Bolivian track athlete at the Beijing games. Born in the de facto Bolivian capital of La Paz, Calizaya competed in Beijing at the age of 32. She had not previously competed at any earlier Olympic games. During the course of the marathon, which took place on August 16, Calizaya competed against 81 other athletes. Of those, 68 finished. Calizaya finished the race in 2 hours, 45 minutes and 53 seconds, placing 59th out of the 69. In comparison, gold medalist Constantina Diță of Romania finished the race in 2 hours, 26 minutes and 44 seconds, and 69th place finalist Oksana Sklyarenko of Ukraine completed the marathon in 2 hours, 55 minutes and 39 seconds.

Key

- Note–Ranks given for track events are within the athlete's heat only
- Q = Qualified for the next round
- q = Qualified for the next round as a fastest loser or, in field events, by position without achieving the qualifying target
- NR = National record
- N/A = Round not applicable for the event
- Bye = Athlete not required to compete in round

Men

Athlete	Event	Heat		Semifinal		Final	
Athlete	Event	Result	Rank	Result	Rank	Result	Rank
Fadrique Iglesias	800 m	1:50.57	7	Did not advance			

Women

Athlete	Event	Final	
Athlete	Event	Result	Rank
Sonia Calizaya	Marathon	2:45:53	59

== Cycling ==
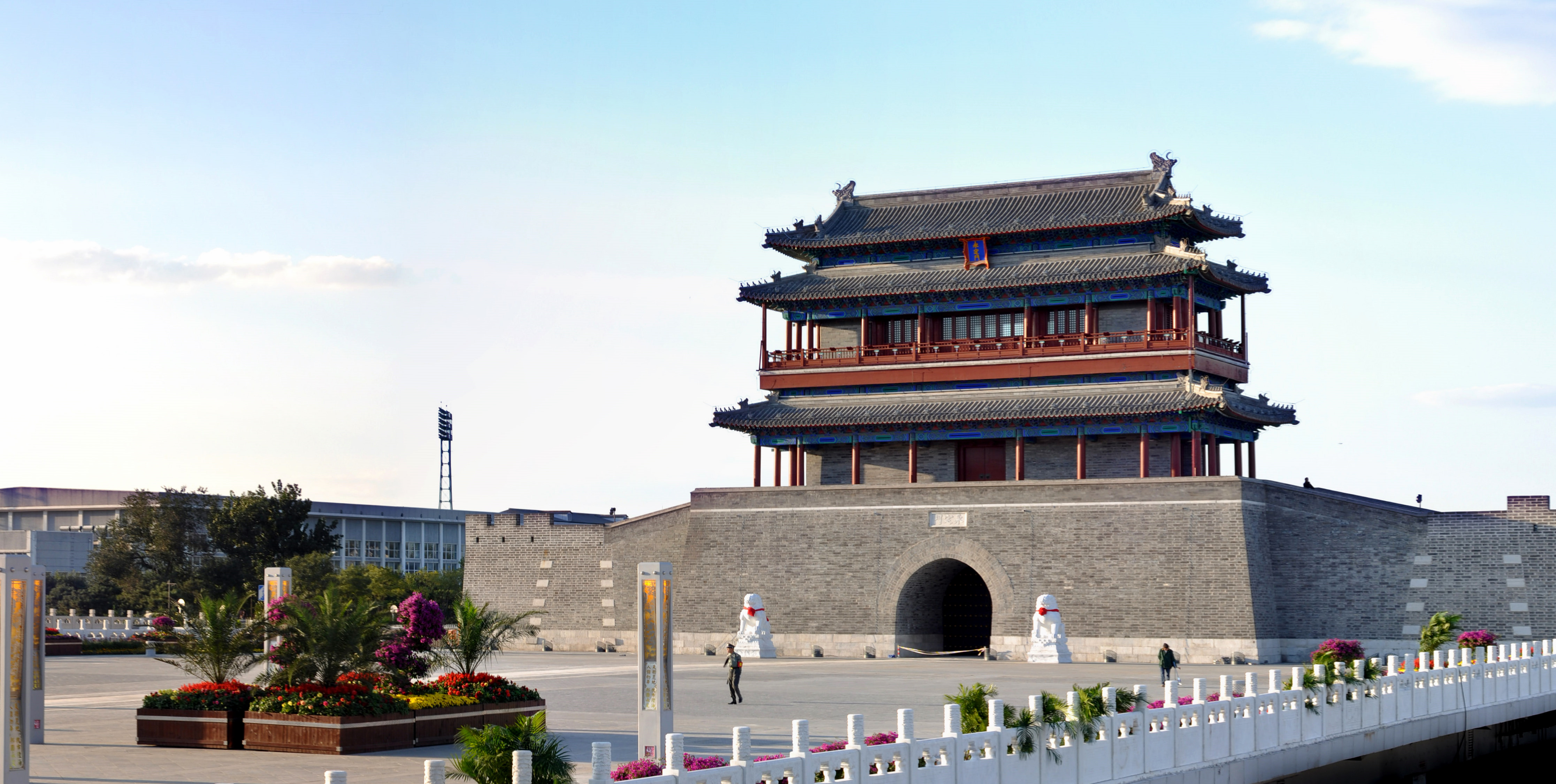
Yongdingmen Square, the starting line of the Urban Road Cycling Course upon which Gallardo competed in his event

Horacio "Torpedo" Gallardo Burgos competed in the Beijing Olympics on Bolivia's behalf as its only road cyclist. He competed in the men's individual road race. Born in the southern town of San Bernardo de la Frontera de Tarija, Gallardo was 27 years old at the time of his competition in Beijing. Gallardo had not previously competed at any Olympic games. He competed in the men's individual road race, which took place on the 8th of August. The competition included 143 cyclists, with 90 finishing the race; Gallardo was one of the 53 competitors who did not finish the race.

Athlete	Event	Time	Rank
Horacio Gallardo	Men's road race	Did not finish	

== Shooting ==
César David Menacho Flores was the sole Bolivian competitor in shooting events at the Beijing Olympics. A competitor in men's trap shooting, Menacho was born in Santa Cruz de la Sierra, and was 43 years old at the Beijing Games. Menacho had not previously competed in any Olympic events. On August 9, during the event's preliminary round, Menacho faced 34 other athletes. The preliminary round consisted of five rounds, with Menacho scoring 24; 22; 21; 18; and 21, respectively, during these rounds. He did not advance to the final, posting a total point score was 106, placing Menacho in 34th place between last-place finalist Eric Ang of the Philippines and 33rd place finalist Alberto Fernandez of Spain at the 2008 Summer Olympics, both of whom also finished with a score of 106. In comparison, the Czech Republic's gold medalist David Kostelecky finished the final round at 146 points.

Men

Athlete	Event	Qualification		Final	
Athlete	Event	Points	Rank	Points	Rank
César Menacho	Trap	106	34	Did not advance	

== Swimming ==
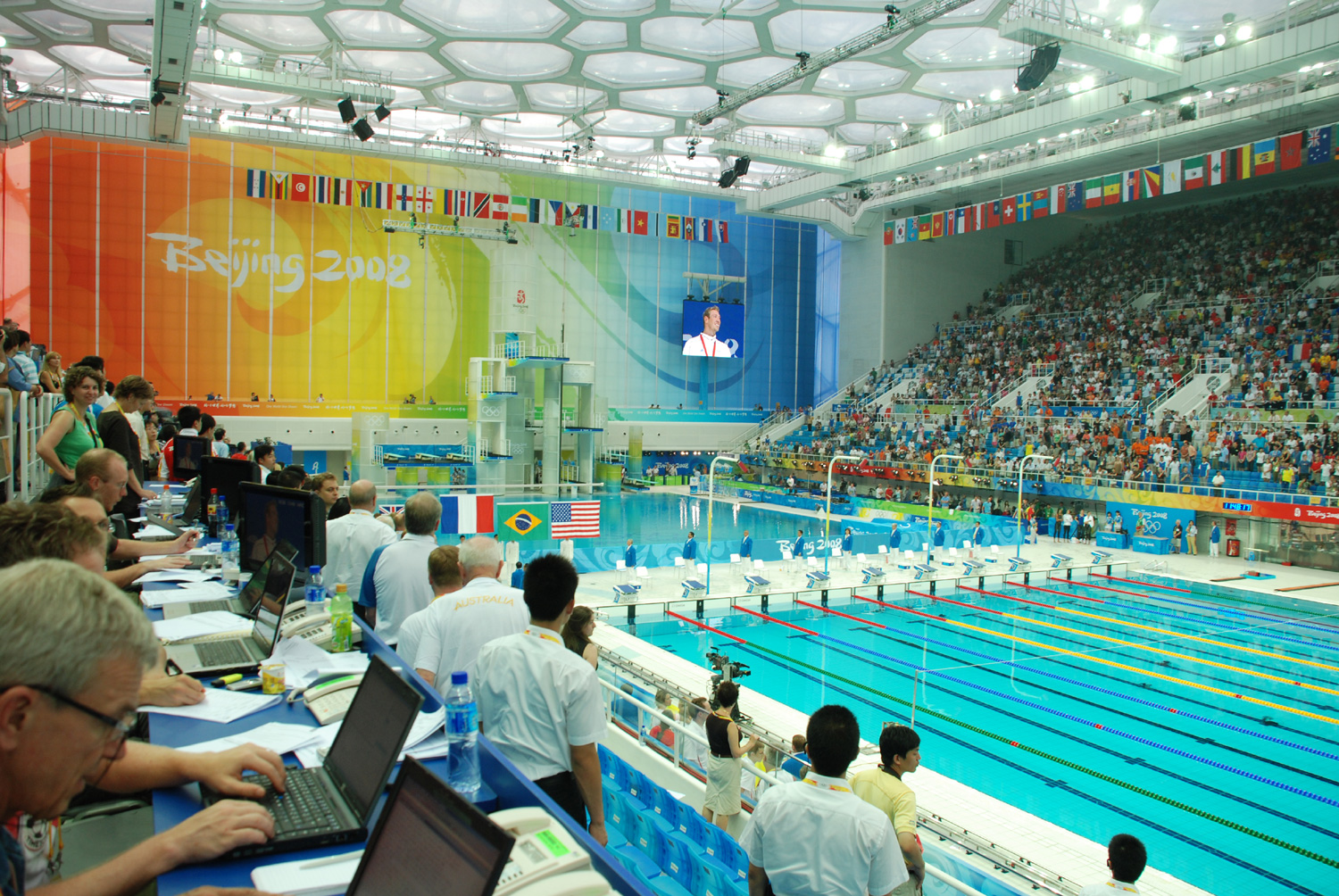
The Beijing National Aquatics Center, where Moreno and Navarro competed in their events

Katerine Moreno de Quintanilla competed on Bolivia's behalf in the women's 50 meters freestyle. Born in the metropolis of Santa Cruz de la Sierra in the central-southern region of the country, Moreno first competed at the Olympics at age 14 in the 1988 Summer Olympics in Seoul, South Korea, where she competed in the women's 50 meters freestyle, 100 meters freestyle, 100 meters backstroke and 100 meters breaststroke. She later qualified for the 2000 Summer Olympics in Sydney, Australia, in the women's 100 meters breaststroke. Moreno returned in the 2004 Summer Olympics in Athens, Greece in the same event. The Bolivian swimmer was 34 when she raced in Beijing, marking her fourth Olympic appearance and seventh Olympic competition. During the preliminary round, Moreno competed in heat four against seven other athletes. She finished fourth with a time of 29.05 seconds, placing ahead of Mongolia's Dashtserengiin Saintsetseg (29.63 seconds) and behind American Samoa's Virginia Farmer (28.82 seconds), in a heat led by Mozambique's Ximene Gomes (28.15 seconds) and Swaziland's Senele Dlamini (28.70 seconds). Of the 90 finishing athletes, Moreno placed 64th. She did not advance to later rounds.

Miguel Ángel Navarro competed on Bolivia's behalf in the men's 100 meters freestyle event. Born in Santa Cruz de la Sierra, Navarro competed in Beijing at the age of 26. He had not previously competed at any Olympic games. During the course of the event's preliminary round, which took place on August 12, Navarro competed in the first heat against two other athletes. He completed the event in 56.96 seconds, placing second between the heat winner Emile Rony Bakale of the Republic of the Congo (55.08 seconds) and last placed Sofyan El Gadi of Libya (57.89 seconds) Overall Navarro ranked 63rd of 64 competitors that competed in the event. Therefore, he did not progress further.

Men

Athlete	Event	Heat		Semifinal		Final	
Athlete	Event	Time	Rank	Time	Rank	Time	Rank
Miguel Ángel Navarro	100 m freestyle	56.96	63	Did not advance			

Women

Athlete	Event	Heat		Semifinal		Final	
Athlete	Event	Time	Rank	Time	Rank	Time	Rank
Katerine Moreno	50 m freestyle	29.05	64	Did not advance			

== Weightlifting ==
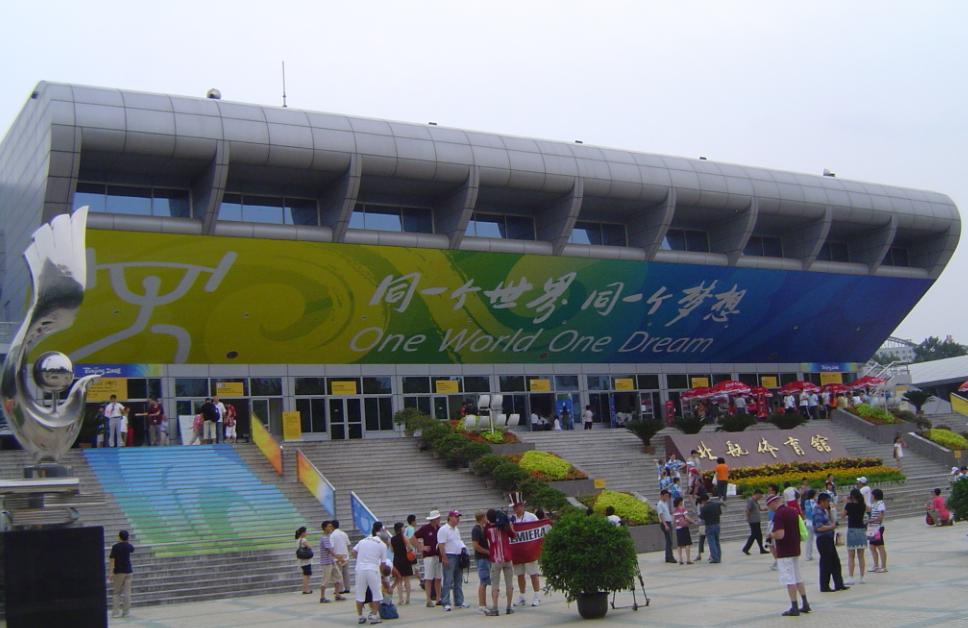
Beihang University Gymnasium, the venue for all weightlifting competitors, including Monasterio

María Teresa Monasterio competed in the middleweight class (63 kilograms or less) of weightlifting on Bolivia's behalf during the Beijing Olympics. Monasterio was Bolivia's only weightlifter during these Olympics. Born in Santa Cruz de la Sierra, Monasterio entered the Beijing competitions at the age of 38. The female competition for Monasterio's weight class took place on August 12 between 20 competitors. During snatches, the Bolivian successfully lifted 60 kilograms on her first attempt and 63 kilograms on her second, and unsuccessfully attempted 65 kilograms on her third. She then successfully lifted 75 kilograms and 78 kilograms in her first two clean and jerk attempts, and unsuccessfully attempted 80 kilograms on her third and final try. Her final score, the combination of her highest snatch and clean and jerk weights, was 141 kilograms. 17 athletes successfully finished, with the Bolivian athlete finishing last of those. Tunisia's Hanene Ourfelli ranked immediately ahead of Monasterio (175 kilograms). In comparison, gold medalist Pak Hyon Suk of North Korea lifted 241 kilograms.

Athlete	Event	Snatch		Clean & Jerk		Total	Rank
Athlete	Event	Result	Rank	Result	Rank	Total	Rank
María Teresa Monasterio	Women's −63 kg	63	17	78	16	141	16

== See also ==
- Bolivia at the 2007 Pan American Games
