= Bolivia at the 1968 Summer Olympics =

- IOC code: BOL
- NOC: Bolivian Olympic Committee

in Mexico City
- Competitors: 4 (4 men and 0 women) in 3 sports
- Medals: Gold 0 Silver 0 Bronze 0 Total 0

Summer Olympics appearances (overview)
- 1936; 1948–1960; 1964; 1968; 1972; 1976; 1980; 1984; 1988; 1992; 1996; 2000; 2004; 2008; 2012; 2016; 2020; 2024

Bolivia at the 1968 Summer Olympics in Mexico City, Mexico was the third appearance of the nation at the Olympic Summer Games. Bolivia sent to the 1968 Summer Olympics its third national team under the auspices of the Bolivian Olympic Committee (Spanish: Comité Olímpico Boliviano – COB). Four athletes (all men) competed in three events in three sports.

== Canoeing ==
- Men's K-1 1000m:
- Fernando Inchauste – DNF

== Equestrian ==
- Roberto Nielsen-Reyes

== Shooting ==
Two male shooters represented Bolivia in 1968.

Trap

- Carlos Asbun
- Ricardo Roberts
