= Bolivia at the 1976 Summer Olympics =

- IOC code: BOL
- NOC: Bolivian Olympic Committee

in Montreal Canada
- Competitors: 4 (4 men and 0 women) in 4 sports
- Medals: Gold 0 Silver 0 Bronze 0 Total 0

Summer Olympics appearances (overview)
- 1936; 1948–1960; 1964; 1968; 1972; 1976; 1980; 1984; 1988; 1992; 1996; 2000; 2004; 2008; 2012; 2016; 2020; 2024

Bolivia competed at the 1976 Summer Olympics in Montreal, Quebec, Canada. Four competitors, all men, took part in five events in four sports.

== Athletics ==
Men's Marathon

- Lucio Guachalla – 2:45:31 (→ 60th place)

== Cycling ==
One cyclist represented Bolivia in 1976.

Individual road race

- Marco Soria – did not finish (→ no ranking)

1000m time trial

- Marco Soria – 1:14.480 (→ 26th place)

== Equestrian ==
- Roberto Nielsen-Reyes

== Shooting ==
- Jaime Sánchez
