= Bolivia at the 2020 Summer Olympics =

- Flag of Bolivia
- IOC code: BOL
- NOC: Bolivian Olympic Committee
- Website: www.comiteolimpicoboliviano.org.bo

in Tokyo, Japan 23 July – 8 August 2021
- Competitors: 5 in 3 sports
- Flag bearers: Karen Torrez; Gabriel Castillo
- Medals: Gold 0 Silver 0 Bronze 0 Total 0

Summer Olympics appearances (overview)
- 1936; 1948–1960; 1964; 1968; 1972; 1976; 1980; 1984; 1988; 1992; 1996; 2000; 2004; 2008; 2012; 2016; 2020; 2024; 2028

Bolivia competed at the 2020 Summer Olympics in Tokyo, Japan, from 23 July to 8 August 2021. It was the nation's fifteenth appearance at the Summer Olympics, since its debut at the 1936 Summer Olympics in Berlin. The Bolivian delegation consisted of five athletes competing in three sports. Bolivia did not win any medals at the Games.

== Background ==
The Bolivian Olympic Committee (Comité Olímpico Boliviano) was founded on 17 June 1932 and recognized by the International Olympic Committee in 1936. The nation made its first Olympic appearance at the 1936 Summer Olympics in Berlin. The2020 Summer Olympics was the nation's fifteenth appearance at the Summer Olympics. Bolivia has never won an Olympic medal.

The 2020 Summer Olympics was held in Tokyo, Japan, between 23 July and 8 August 2021. Originally scheduled to take place from 24 July to 9 August 2020, the Games were postponed due to the COVID-19 pandemic. For the first time, the International Olympic Committee invited each National Olympic Committee to select one female and one male athlete to jointly carry their flag during the opening ceremony. Swimmers Karen Torrez, who was Bolivia's flag bearer at the 2012 Summer Olympics, and Gabriel Castillo jointly served as Bolivia's flag-bearers at the opening ceremony. Bolivia did not win a medal at the Games.

== Competitors ==
The Bolivian delegation consisted of two track and field athletes, two swimmers, and tennis player Hugo Dellien.

Sport	Men	Women	Total
Athletics	1	1	2
Swimming	1	1	2
Tennis	1	0	1
Total	3	2	5

== Athletics ==
As per the governing body World Athletics (WA), a NOC was allowed to enter up to three qualified athletes in each individual event and one qualified relay team if the Olympic Qualifying Standards (OQS) for the respective events had been met during the qualifying period. The remaining places were allocated based on the World Athletics Rankings which were derived from the average of the best five results for an athlete over the designated qualifying period, weighted by the importance of the meet. Bolivia received universality slots from World Athletics to send two athletes, one male and one female, to the Games.

The athletics events were held at the Japan National Stadium in Tokyo. In the men's 100 m, Bruno Rojas ranked fifth in his heat and did not qualify for the semifinals. Ángela Castro was ranked 48th in the Women's 20 km walk with a time of over one hour and 42 minutes. This was the second Olympic appearance for both Rojas and Castro, after their debuts in the 2012 Summer Olympics and 2016 Summer Olympics respectively.

Key

- Note–Ranks given for track events are within the athlete's heat only
- Q = Qualified for the next round
- q = Qualified for the next round as a fastest loser or, in field events, by position without achieving the qualifying target
- NR = National record
- N/A = Round not applicable for the event
- Bye = Athlete not required to compete in round

Track & road events

Athlete	Event	Heat		Quarterfinal		Semifinal		Final	
Athlete	Event	Result	Rank	Result	Rank	Result	Rank	Result	Rank
Bruno Rojas	Men's 100 m	10:64	5	Did not advance					
Ángela Castro	Women's 20 km walk	—N/a						1:42:25	48

== Swimming ==
As per the Fédération internationale de natation (FINA) guidelines, a NOC was permitted to enter a maximum of two qualified athletes in each individual event, who have achieved the Olympic Qualifying Time (OQT). If the quota was not filled, one athlete per event was allowed to enter, provided they achieved the Olympic Selection Time (OST). The qualifying time standards should have been achieved in competitions approved by World Aquatics in the period between 1 March 2019 to 27 June 2021. FINA also allowed NOCs to enter swimmers (one per gender) under a universality place even if they have not achieved the standard entry times (OQT/OST). Bolivia sent two swimmers, one male and one female, to the Games under the universality quota.

The swimming events were held at the Tokyo Aquatics Centre. Karen Torrez competed in the women's 50 metre freestyle and Gabriel Castillo competed in the men's 100 metre backstroke, and neither advanced past the heats. This was the second consecutive Olympic appearance for Torrez after her debut in the 2016 Summer Olympics, and the only Olympic participation for Castillo.

Athlete	Event	Heat		Semifinal		Final	
Athlete	Event	Time	Rank	Time	Rank	Time	Rank
Gabriel Castillo	Men's 100 m backstroke	58.24	39	Did not advance			
Karen Torrez	Women's 50 m freestyle	25.77	=35	Did not advance			

== Tennis ==
As per the International Tennis Federation, the main qualifying criterion was based on the players' positions on the ATP Entry Ranking and WTA ranking lists published on 14 June 2021. Additionally, players had to have been part of the nominated team for three Billie Jean King Cup (women) or Davis Cup (men) events between the 2016 and 2020. This requirement was reduced to two events if the player had represented their nation at least twenty times. Each NOC could enter six athletes of each gender with a maximum of four entries in the individual events, and two pairs in the doubles events. The top 56 ranked players in the singles event qualified directly with spots allocated to subsequent ranked players if the NOCs exhaust the quota of four. For the doubles event, top ten ranked players qualified directly and were allowed to choose their partners ranked under 300.

Bolivia qualified one tennis player for the first time since Sydney 2000. Following withdrawals of other players, Hugo Dellien (world no. 129) received a quota spot through the ATP rankings. In the first round of the men's singles, held at the Ariake Tennis Park, Dellien was drawn against world no. 1 Novak Djokovic of Serbia and lost 6–2, 6–2 in 61 minutes.

Men's singles

Athlete	Event	Round of 64	Round of 32	Round of 16	Quarterfinals	Semifinals	Final / BM	
Athlete	Event	Opposition Score	Opposition Score	Opposition Score	Opposition Score	Opposition Score	Opposition Score	Rank
Hugo Dellien	Men's singles	Djokovic (SRB); L 2–6, 2–6	Did not advance					

== See also ==
- Bolivia at the 2016 Summer Olympics
- Bolivia at the 2024 Summer Olympics
