= Bolivia at the 1964 Summer Olympics =

- IOC code: BOL
- NOC: Bolivian Olympic Committee

in Tokyo
- Competitors: 1 in 1 sport
- Flag bearer: Fernando Inchauste
- Medals: Gold 0 Silver 0 Bronze 0 Total 0

Summer Olympics appearances (overview)
- 1936; 1948–1960; 1964; 1968; 1972; 1976; 1980; 1984; 1988; 1992; 1996; 2000; 2004; 2008; 2012; 2016; 2020; 2024

Bolivia competed at the 1964 Summer Olympics in Tokyo, Japan, which were held from 9 to 24 October 1984. The country's participation in Tokyo marked its second appearance at the Summer Olympics since its debut in 1936, and after a long hiatus between the two Games. The Bolivian athlete delegation consisted of one competitor, canoeist Fernando Inchauste.

Inchauste competed in the men's K-1 1000 metres event and placed sixth in the heats, advancing him to the repechage round. He placed third in the round and advanced to the semifinals, though did not compete. Thus, Bolivia has yet to win an Olympic medal.

== Background ==
The 1964 Summer Olympics were held in Tokyo, Japan, from 10 to 24 October 1984. This edition of the games marked Bolivia's second appearance at the Summer Olympics since its debut at the 1936 Summer Olympics in Berlin, Germany, and after a hiatus in between the two Summer Games. The nation had never won a medal at the Olympic Games, with its best finish coming from swimmer Alberto Conrad who competed in the men's 100 metre freestyle, placed seventh in his heat, and did not advance further at the 1936 Summer Games. Canoeist Fernando Inchauste was the sole athlete at the 1964 Summer Games. Runners Alberto Garabito and Alejo Montano were entered to compete in the men's marathon though did not start in their event.

== Canoeing ==
The canoeing events for the games were held at Lake Sagami. Inchauste competed in the heats of the men's K-1 1000 metres on 20 October. He recorded a time of 5:48.74 and was moved to the repechage rounds. At the repechage in the same day, he recorded a time of 6:07.70 and placed third, not advancing further.

Canoeing summary
Athlete	Event	Heats		Repechage		Semifinals		Final	
Athlete	Event	Time	Rank	Time	Rank	Time	Rank	Time	Rank
Fernando Inchauste	Men's K-1 1000 m	5:48.74	6 QR	6:07.70	3	Did not advance			
