= Bolivia at the 2024 Summer Olympics =

- IOC code: BOL
- NOC: Bolivian Olympic Committee
- Website: www.cobol.org.bo (in Spanish)

in Paris, France 26 July 2024 – 11 August 2024
- Competitors: 4 (2 men and 2 women) in 2 sports
- Flag bearers (opening): Héctor Garibay & María José Ribera
- Flag bearers (closing): Héctor Garibay & Guadalupe Torrez
- Medals: Gold 0 Silver 0 Bronze 0 Total 0

Summer Olympics appearances (overview)
- 1936; 1948–1960; 1964; 1968; 1972; 1976; 1980; 1984; 1988; 1992; 1996; 2000; 2004; 2008; 2012; 2016; 2020; 2024

Bolivia competed at the 2024 Summer Olympics in Paris, France, from 26 July to 11 August 2024. The nation made its official debut at the 1936 Summer Olympics in Berlin, and Bolivian athletes have appeared in every edition of the Summer Olympics from the 1964 Summer Olympics onwards, except for the 1980 Summer Olympics in Moscow. The 2024 Games marked the nation's sixteenth appearance at the Summer Olympics. The Bolivian delegation consisted of four athletes competing in two sports. The country did not win any medals at the Games.

== Background ==
The Bolivian Olympic Committee was founded in 1932 and was recognized by the International Olympic Committee (IOC) in 1936. The nation made its first Olympic appearance at the 1936 Summer Olympics in Berlin. Following a period of absence, Bolivia returned to the Summer Olympics at the 1964 Summer Olympics in Tokyo. Since then, it has competed in every Summer Olympics except the 1980 Summer Olympics in Moscow. The 2024 Summer Olympics was the nation's sixteenth appearance at the Summer Olympics.

The 2024 Summer Olympics was held in Paris, France, between 26 July and 11 August 2024. Marathon runner Héctor Garibay and swimmer María José Ribera were the country's flag bearers at the opening ceremony. Garibay and sprinter Guadalupe Torrez served as the flag bearers during the closing ceremony. Bolivia did not win a medal at the Games.

== Competitors ==
The Bolivian team consisted of four athletes competing in two sports.

Sport	Men	Women	Total
Athletics	1	1	2
Swimming	1	1	2
Total	2	2	4

== Athletics ==
As per the governing body World Athletics (WA), a NOC was allowed to enter up to three qualified athletes in each individual event if the Olympic Qualifying Standards (OQS) had been met during the qualification period from 1 July 2023 to 30 June 2024. Bolivia qualified two athletes for the track and field events. Héctor Garibay competed in the men's marathon and Guadalupe Torrez in the women's 100 metres.

Garibay, born on 9 July 1988 in Oruro, Bolivia, was making his Summer Olympics debut. He holds the Bolivian national record in the marathon with a time of 2:07:44, set at the 2023 Seville Marathon in February 2023. He has won a silver medal in the South American Marathon Championships and a bronze medal at the South American Games. Torrez, born on 17 May 2001 in Santa Cruz de la Sierra, was also making here debut. She holds the Bolivian national record in the women's 60 and 100 metres races, and is a five-time Bolivian national champion in the 100 metres event.

The athletics events were held at the Stade de France in Saint-Denis. In the women's 100 metres, held on 2 August 2024, Torrez finished second in heat 3 of the preliminary round with a time of 11.60 seconds, and advanced the heats. She subsequently finished eighth in her heat of round one with a time of 11.68 seconds and did not advance to the semi-finals. She was only the second Bolivian athlete to advance past the preliminary round of the women's 100 metres at the Olympics. In the men's marathon, held on 10 August 2024, Garibay finished 60th out of 80 classified finishers with a time of 2:15:54, the third-best result among South American competitors in the race.

Key

- Note–Ranks given for track events are within the athlete's heat only
- Q = Qualified for the next round
- q = Qualified for the next round as a fastest loser or, in field events, by position without achieving the qualifying target
- NR = National record
- N/A = Round not applicable for the event
- Bye = Athlete not required to compete in round

Track and road events

Athlete	Event	Preliminary		Heat		Semifinal		Final	
Athlete	Event	Result	Rank	Result	Rank	Result	Rank	Result	Rank
Héctor Garibay	Men's marathon	—N/a						2:15:54 SB	60
Guadalupe Torrez	Women's 100 m	11.60	3 Q	11.68	8	Did not advance			

== Swimming ==
As per the World Aquatics guidelines, a NOC was permitted to enter a maximum of two qualified athletes in each individual event, who have achieved the Olympic Qualifying Time. One athlete per event will be allowed to enter if they meet the Olympic Selection Time if the quota is not filled. NOCs were allowed to enter swimmers (one per gender) under a universality place even if no one achieved the standard entry times. Bolivia sent two swimmers to compete at the 2024 Paris Olympics. Esteban Núñez del Prado competed in the men's 200 metre individual medley and María José Ribera competed in the women's 50 metre freestyle.

Núñez del Prado trained at Azura Swimming Club in Florida under the World Aquatics scholarship programme. Ribera, born on 28 October 1996 in Santa Cruz de la Sierra, had previously competed at the 2014 Summer Youth Olympics. She was making her Summer Olympics debut.

The swimming events were held at the Paris La Défense Arena in Nanterre. Núñez del Prado finished 23rd in the men's 200 metre individual medley heat with a time of 2:08.10 and did not advance to the semi-finals. Ribera was initially recorded in 28th position in the women's 50 metre freestyle heat. However, she was subsequently disqualified following her anti-doping rule violation. Following the Games, on 29 August 2024, the International Testing Agency (ITA) issued a provisional suspension against Ribera for an anti-doping rule violation. She was subsequently suspended for two years.

Athlete	Event	Heat		Semifinal		Final	
Athlete	Event	Time	Rank	Time	Rank	Time	Rank
Esteban Núñez del Prado	Men's 200 m medley	2:08.10	23	Did not advance			
María José Ribera	Women's 50 m freestyle	~~26.07~~	DQ	Did not advance and was disqualified for failing drugs test			

Qualifiers for the latter rounds of all events were decided on a time only basis, therefore positions shown are overall results versus competitors in all heats.

== See also ==
- Bolivia at the 2023 Pan American Games
