= Bolivia at the 1984 Summer Olympics =

- IOC code: BOL
- NOC: Bolivian Olympic Committee

in Los Angeles
- Competitors: 11 (10 men and 1 woman) in 6 sports
- Medals: Gold 0 Silver 0 Bronze 0 Total 0

Summer Olympics appearances (overview)
- 1936; 1948–1960; 1964; 1968; 1972; 1976; 1980; 1984; 1988; 1992; 1996; 2000; 2004; 2008; 2012; 2016; 2020; 2024

Bolivia competed at the 1984 Summer Olympics in Los Angeles, United States. The nation returned to the Summer Games after participating in the American-led boycott of the 1980 Summer Olympics. Eleven competitors, ten men and one woman, took part in eleven events in six sports.

== Prior to the Games ==
On June 3, 1984, Bolivian President Hernán Siles Zuazo stated in a communique that Bolivia's 14 member delegation would not be allowed to travel to L.A. for the Games due to an economic crisis. The decision sparked widespread protest among Bolivian sports officials and members of Bolivia's political opposition, who charged the real motive was pressure from the Bolivian Communist Party—at that time a member of the government's ruling coalition—to join the Soviet led boycott. The decision was rescinded once sufficient funding was achieved, however, when an article written by Tony Kornheiser of The Washington Post making light of poverty in Bolivia caused indignation from Bolivians believing the article "offended the dignity of our country", President Zuazo declared a boycott of the Games. After The Washington Post issued an editorial apology, President Zuazo reversed the boycott decision, and eleven athletes from Bolivia eventually competed at the Games.

== Athletics ==
Men's Marathon

- Juan Camacho
  - Final — 2:21:04 (→ 38th place)

Men's 20 km Walk

- Oswaldo Morejón
  - Final — 1:44:42 (→ 36th place)

Men's 50 km Walk

- Osvaldo Morejón
  - Final — DNF (→ no ranking)

Women's Marathon

- Nelly Chávez
  - Final — 2:51:35 (→ 42nd place)

== Boxing ==
Men's Flyweight (– 51 kg)

- René Centellas
  - First Round — Lost to Jeff Fenech (AUS), RSC-3

Men's Heavyweight (– 91 kg)

- Marvin Perez
  - First Round — Bye
  - Second Round — Scheduled to fight Henry Tillman (USA), but sustained a broken hand beforehand and withdrew.

== Fencing ==
One male fencer represented Bolivia in 1984.

Men's foil

- Saúl Mendoza

Men's épée

- Saúl Mendoza

== Judo ==
Men's Competition

- Edgar Claure

== Shooting ==
Men's Competition

- Javier Asbun
- Víctor Hugo Campos
- Luis Gamarra
- Mauricio Kattan

== Wrestling ==
Men's Competition

- Leonardo Camacho
