= Bolivia at the 2004 Summer Olympics =

- IOC code: BOL
- NOC: Bolivian Olympic Committee
- Website: www.cobol.org.bo (in Spanish)

in Athens
- Competitors: 7 in 5 sports
- Flag bearer: Geovana Irusta
- Medals: Gold 0 Silver 0 Bronze 0 Total 0

Summer Olympics appearances (overview)
- 1936; 1948–1960; 1964; 1968; 1972; 1976; 1980; 1984; 1988; 1992; 1996; 2000; 2004; 2008; 2012; 2016; 2020; 2024

Bolivia competed at the 2004 Summer Olympics in Athens, Greece from 13 to 29 August 2004.

== Athletics ==
Bolivian athletes have so far achieved qualifying standards in the following athletics events (up to a maximum of 3 athletes in each event at the 'A' Standard, and 1 at the 'B' Standard).

Key

- Note–Ranks given for track events are within the athlete's heat only
- Q = Qualified for the next round
- q = Qualified for the next round as a fastest loser or, in field events, by position without achieving the qualifying target
- NR = National record
- N/A = Round not applicable for the event
- Bye = Athlete not required to compete in round

Men

Athlete	Event	Heat		Semifinal		Final	
Athlete	Event	Result	Rank	Result	Rank	Result	Rank
Fadrique Iglesias	800 m	1:51.87	8	Did not advance			

Women

Athlete	Event	Final	
Athlete	Event	Result	Rank
Geovana Irusta	20 km walk	1:38:36	41

== Gymnastics ==
=== Artistic ===
Bolivia qualified a female gymnast.

Athlete	Event	Qualification						Final					
Athlete	Event	Apparatus				Total	Rank	Apparatus				Total	Rank
Athlete	Event	V	UB	BB	F	Total	Rank	V	UB	BB	F	Total	Rank
María José de la Fuente	All-around	8.625	8.312	7.387	8.325	32.649	61	Did not advance					

== Judo ==
Bolivia has qualified a single judoka through a tripartite invitation.

Athlete	Event	Round of 32	Round of 16	Quarterfinals	Semifinals	Repechage 1	Repechage 2	Repechage 3	Final / BM	
Athlete	Event	Opposition Result	Opposition Result	Opposition Result	Opposition Result	Opposition Result	Opposition Result	Opposition Result	Opposition Result	Rank
Juan José Paz	Men's −66 kg	Young (AUS); L 0000–0103	Did not advance							

== Shooting ==
Athlete	Event	Qualification		Final	
Athlete	Event	Points	Rank	Points	Rank
Rudolf Knijnenburg	10 m air pistol	548	47	Did not advance	

== Swimming ==
Men

Athlete	Event	Heat		Semifinal		Final	
Athlete	Event	Time	Rank	Time	Rank	Time	Rank
Mauricio Prudencio	50 m freestyle	24.82	=58	Did not advance			

Women

Athlete	Event	Heat		Semifinal		Final	
Athlete	Event	Time	Rank	Time	Rank	Time	Rank
Katerine Moreno	100 m breaststroke	1:18.25	41	Did not advance			

== See also ==
- Bolivia at the 2003 Pan American Games
