= Bolivia at the 1996 Summer Olympics =

- IOC code: BOL
- NOC: Bolivian Olympic Committee
- Website: www.cobol.org.bo (in Spanish)

in Atlanta
- Competitors: 8 (6 men, 2 women) in 5 sports
- Flag bearer: Policarpio Calizaya
- Medals: Gold 0 Silver 0 Bronze 0 Total 0

Summer Olympics appearances (overview)
- 1936; 1948–1960; 1964; 1968; 1972; 1976; 1980; 1984; 1988; 1992; 1996; 2000; 2004; 2008; 2012; 2016; 2020; 2024

Bolivia competed at the 1996 Summer Olympics in Atlanta, United States. Eight competitors, six men and two women, took part in nine events in five sports.

== Competitors ==
The following is the list of number of competitors in the Games.

Sport	Men	Women	Total
Athletics	2	1	3
Cycling	1	0	1
Diving	1	0	1
Fencing	1	0	1
Swimming	1	1	2
Total	6	2	8

== Athletics ==
Men
Track & road events

Athlete	Event	Heat		Quarterfinal		Semifinal		Final	
Athlete	Event	Result	Rank	Result	Rank	Result	Rank	Result	Rank
Jorge Castellon	100 m	10.74	100	did not advance					
Policarpio Calizaya	Marathon	—N/a						2:33:08	91

Women
Track & road events

Athlete	Event	Heat		Quarterfinal		Semifinal		Final	
Athlete	Event	Result	Rank	Result	Rank	Result	Rank	Result	Rank
Geovanna Irusta	10 km walk	—N/a						47:13	34

== Cycling ==
=== Track ===
Sprints

Athlete	Event	Qualifying		1/32 finals (Repechage)	1/16 finals (Repechage)	1/8 finals (Repechage)	Quarterfinals	Semifinals	Finals (5th-8th)	
Athlete	Event	Time Speed (km/h)	Rank	Opposition Time Speed (km/h)	Opposition Time Speed (km/h)	Opposition Time Speed (km/h)	Opposition Times Speed (km/h)	Opposition Time Speed (km/h)	Opposition Time Speed (km/h)	Rank
Claus Martínez	Men's sprint	12.341; 58.342	24 Q	Neiwand (AUS); L 14.373; 50.094; Clay (USA); L 11.191; 64.337	did not advance					

== Diving ==
Men

Athlete	Event	Preliminaries		Semifinals		Final	
Athlete	Event	Points	Rank	Points	Rank	Points	Rank
Tony Iglesias	3 m springboard	307.83	27	Did not advance			
Tony Iglesias	10 m platform	290.16	30	Did not advance			

== Fencing ==
Athlete	Event	Round of 64	Round of 32	Round of 16	Quarterfinals	Semifinals	Final
Athlete	Event	Opposition Result	Opposition Result	Opposition Result	Opposition Result	Opposition Result	Opposition Result
Miguel Robles	Men's individual sabre	Peinador (ESP); L 7–15	did not advance				

== Swimming ==
Men

Athlete	Events	Heat		Final	
Athlete	Events	Time	Rank	Time	Rank
David Pereira	100 m butterfly	1:01.63	58	did not advance	

Women

Athlete	Events	Heat		Final	
Athlete	Events	Time	Rank	Time	Rank
Ximena Escalera	100 m backstroke	1:11.70	35	did not advance	

== See also ==
- Bolivia at the 1995 Pan American Games
