= Bolivia at the 2016 Summer Olympics =

- IOC code: BOL
- NOC: Bolivian Olympic Committee
- Website: www.cobol.org.bo (in Spanish)

in Rio de Janeiro
- Competitors: 12 in 5 sports
- Flag bearer: Ángela Castro
- Medals: Gold 0 Silver 0 Bronze 0 Total 0

Summer Olympics appearances (overview)
- 1936; 1948–1960; 1964; 1968; 1972; 1976; 1980; 1984; 1988; 1992; 1996; 2000; 2004; 2008; 2012; 2016; 2020; 2024; 2028

Bolivia competed at the 2016 Summer Olympics in Rio de Janeiro, Brazil, from 5 to 21 August 2016. This was the nation's fourteenth appearance at the Summer Olympics, since its debut in 1936.

Bolivian Olympic Committee (Spanish: Comité Olímpico Boliviano sent the nation's second-largest delegation in history to the Games, falling short of a roster size set in Barcelona 1992 by a single athlete. A total of 12 athletes, six per gender, were selected to the Bolivian team across five different sports; three of them returned for their second appearance, while the rest of the delegation attended the Games for the first time.

Notable Bolivian athletes featured pistol shooter Rudolf Knijnenburg, who staged his comeback in Rio de Janeiro after a twelve-year absence, freestyle swimmer Karen Torrez, and race walkers Claudia Balderrama and Ángela Castro, who was chosen to lead the team as the nation's flag bearer into the opening ceremony. Bolivia, however, has yet to win its first ever Olympic medal.

== Athletics (track and field) ==
Bolivian athletes have so far achieved qualifying standards in the following athletics events (up to a maximum of 3 athletes in each event):

Key

- Note–Ranks given for track events are within the athlete's heat only
- Q = Qualified for the next round
- q = Qualified for the next round as a fastest loser or, in field events, by position without achieving the qualifying target
- NR = National record
- N/A = Round not applicable for the event
- Bye = Athlete not required to compete in round

Track & road events

Athlete	Event	Final	
Athlete	Event	Result	Rank
Ronald Quispe	Men's 50 km walk	4:02:00	30
Marco Antonio Rodríguez	Men's 20 km walk	1:25:11	45
Ángela Castro	Women's 20 km walk	1:32:54	18
Wendy Cornejo	Women's 20 km walk	1:35:17	31
Stefany Coronado	Women's 20 km walk	1:37:56	43
Rosemary Quispe	Women's marathon	2:58:32	117

== Cycling ==
=== Road ===
Bolivia has received an invitation from the Tripartite Commission to send a rider competing in the men's road race to the Olympics.

Athlete	Event	Time	Rank
Óscar Soliz	Men's road race	Did not finish	

== Judo ==
Bolivia has qualified one judoka for the men's middleweight category (90 kg) at the Games, signifying the nation's Olympic return to the sport for the first time since 2004. Martin Michel earned a continental quota spot from the Pan American region as the Bolivia's top-ranked judoka outside of direct qualifying position in the IJF World Ranking List of 30 May 2016.

Athlete	Event	Round of 64	Round of 32	Round of 16	Quarterfinals	Semifinals	Repechage	Final / BM	
Athlete	Event	Opposition Result	Opposition Result	Opposition Result	Opposition Result	Opposition Result	Opposition Result	Opposition Result	Rank
Martín Michel	Men's −90 kg	González (CUB); L 000–110	Did not advance						

== Shooting ==
Bolivia has received two invitations from the Tripartite Commission to send shooters competing in the men's pistol and women's rifle events to the Olympics.

Athlete	Event	Qualification		Final	
Athlete	Event	Points	Rank	Points	Rank
Rudolf Knijnenburg	Men's 50 m pistol	522	41	Did not advance	
Carina García	Women's 10 m air rifle	405.6	44	Did not advance	

Qualification Legend: Q = Qualify for the next round; q = Qualify for the bronze medal (shotgun)

== Swimming ==
Bolivia has received a Universality invitation from FINA to send two swimmers (one male and one female) to the Olympics.

Athlete	Event	Heat		Semifinal		Final	
Athlete	Event	Time	Rank	Time	Rank	Time	Rank
José Alberto Quintanilla	Men's 50 m freestyle	23.35	46	Did not advance			
Karen Torrez	Women's 50 m freestyle	26.12	46	Did not advance			

== See also ==
- Bolivia at the 2015 Pan American Games
