= List of Bolivian records in athletics =

The following are the national records in athletics in Bolivia maintained by its national athletics federation: Federación Atlética de Bolivia (FAB).

== Outdoor ==
Key to tables: Awaiting ratification Record not kept by FAB Not ratified or later rescinded by FAB

=== Men ===
Event	Record	Athlete	Date	Meet	Place	Ref.
100 m	10.36 (+2.0 m/s) (Note: per athlerecords.net source, 0.0 m/s per IAAF source)	Bruno Rojas	20 May 2012 (Note: per athlerecords.net source, 19 May 2012 per IAAF source)		Sucre, Bolivia	
200 m	20.63 A (+1.7 m/s)	Bruno Rojas	24 April 2016	Torneo Julia Iriarte	Tarija, Bolivia	
400 m	47.12 A	Fernando Copa	6 June 2018	South American Games	Cochabamba, Bolivia	
800 m	1:48.16	Fadrique Iglesias	27 May 2006	Ibero-American Championships	Ponce, Puerto Rico	
1000 m	2:29.4 h	Evans Pinto	4 May 2003		Santa Cruz de la Sierra, Bolivia	
1500 m	3:43.60	David Ninavia	1 July 2022		Valledupar, Colombia	
3000 m	8:05.26	David Ninavia	10 May 2024	Ibero-American Championships	Cuiabá, Brazil	
5000 m	13:57.80	Vidal Basco	26 May 2019	South American Championships	Lima, Peru	
5 km (road)	14:20+	Hector Garibay Flores	31 December 2021		São Paulo, Brazil	
10,000 m	28:34.37	Vidal Basco	9 August 2019		Lima, Peru	
10 km (road)	29:00	Vidal Basco	5 March 2022		Cipolletti, Argentina	
15 km	45:16+	Hector Garibay Flores	31 December 2021		São Paulo, Brazil	
15 km	44:52	Rolando Pillco	27 October 2002		Santa Cruz de la Sierra, Bolivia	
20 km (road)	1:00:00+	Hector Garibay Flores	20 February 2022	Seville Marathon	Seville, Spain	
Half marathon	1:02:50	Vidal Basco	1 May 2022		Lima, Peru	
25 km (road)	1:30:55+	Hector Garibay Flores	19 February 2023	Seville Marathon	Seville, Spain	
30 km (road)	1:30:55+	Hector Garibay Flores	19 February 2023	Seville Marathon	Seville, Spain	
Marathon	2:07:44	Hector Garibay Flores	19 February 2023	Seville Marathon	Seville, Spain	
110 m hurdles	14.79 A (NWI)	Vladimir Aponte	4 June 1994 (Note: by FAB source; 3 September 1994 by World Athletics source)		Cochabamba, Bolivia	
110 m hurdles	14.5 h A (NWI)	Vladimir Aponte	3 September 1994		Arequipa, Peru	
400 m hurdles	54.71	Ignacio Novarro	26 May 1995	South American Championships	Manaus, Brazil	
400 m hurdles	53.7 h A	Roberto Prado	16 October 1983		La Paz, Bolivia	
3000 m steeplechase	8:52.19	Vidal Basco	20 May 2022		Alicante, Spain	
High jump	2.10 m A	Claudio Pinto	12 November 1989		La Paz, Bolivia	
Pole vault	3.90 m A	Daniel Araújo	24 August 1986		Cochabamba, Bolivia	
Long jump	7.41 m A (NWI)	Ramiro Villaroel	24 May 1996		Cochabamba, Bolivia	
Triple jump	15.01 m A (+1.1 m/s)	David Soliz	14 April 2018		Tarija, Bolivia	
Shot put	19.11 m	Aldo González	11 June 2016	Bolivian Championships	Santa Cruz de la Sierra, Bolivia	
Discus throw	52.11 m	Dónald Olmos	28 July 2011		Barquisimeto, Venezuela	
Hammer throw	53.50 m A	Manuel Teran	14 April 2019		Cochabamba, Bolivia	
Javelin throw	67.93 m A	Melbin Soto	17 June 2021		Cochabamba, Bolivia	
Decathlon	6122 pts h A (Note: ratified by FAB but not recognized by World Athletics)	Roberto Prado	12–13 December 1976		La Paz, Bolivia	
Decathlon	100m / Long jump / Shot put / High jump / 400m / 110m H / Discus / Pole vault / Javelin / 1500m; 10.5 h (NWI) / 6.68 m (NWI) / 10.83 m / 1.80 m / 49.8 h / 20.2 (NWI) / 32.73 m / 2.62 m / 42.21 m / 4:41.4 h					
Decathlon	5885 pts h A (Note: not ratified by FAB but recognized by World Athletics)	Roberto Prado	27–28 November 1976		La Paz, Bolivia	
Decathlon	100m / Long jump / Shot put / High jump / 400m / 110m H / Discus / Pole vault / Javelin / 1500m; 10.5 w / 6.68 m / 10.83 m / 1.80 m / 49.8 / 20.2 / 32.73 m / 2.62 m / 42.21 m / 4:41.4					
20,000 m walk (track)	1:25:41.99	Pablo Rodríguez	24 September 2016		Lima, Peru	
20 km walk (road)	1:23:35	Marco Antonio Rodríguez	9 May 2015	Pan American Race Walking Cup	Arica, Chile	
30 km walk (road)	2:23:11+	Ronal Quispe	19 August 2016	Olympic Games	Rio de Janeiro, Brazil	
35 km walk (road)	2:50:13	Ronal Quispe	23 January 2016		Santa Cruz de la Sierra, Bolivia	
35 km walk (road)	2:46:58+	Ronal Quispe	19 August 2016	Olympic Games	Rio de Janeiro, Brazil	
35 km walk (road)	2:47:13+ (Note: not ratified by FAB but recognized by World Athletics)	Ronal Quispe	13 August 2017		London, United Kingdom	
50 km walk (road)	4:02:00	Ronal Quispe	19 August 2016	Olympic Games	Rio de Janeiro, Brazil	
4 × 100 m relay	40.46 A	Bolivia; Carlos Aban; Roberto Bustillo; Julian Vargas; Pablo Aban	7 June 2018	South American Games	Cochabamba, Bolivia	
4 × 400 m relay	3:17.2 h (Note: by FAB source; 3:17.25 by World Athletics source) A	Bolivia; E. Aguayo; J. Torrico; Roberto Prado; Juan Ibañez	22 October 1977		La Paz, Bolivia	

=== Women ===
Event	Record	Athlete	Date	Meet	Place	Ref.
100 m	11.67 A (+0.7 m/s)	Guadalupe Torres	29 April 2023		Cochabamba, Bolivia	
200 m	24.25 A (−0.5 m/s)	Leticia Arispe	8 August 2021		Cochabamba, Bolivia	
400 m	53.90 A	Cecilia Gómez	18 April 2021		Cochabamba, Bolivia	
800 m	2:03.98	Niusha Mancilla	15 September 2001	Bolivarian Games	Ambato, Ecuador	
1500 m	4:16.64	Niusha Mancilla	7 June 2003		Seville, Spain	
2000 m	5:59.96	Niusha Mancilla	10 June 2004		Rivas-Vaciamadrid, Spain	
3000 m	9:16.03	Niusha Mancilla	8 June 2002		Seville, Spain	
5000 m	16:13.14	Jhoselyn Camargo	30 May 2021	South American Championships	Guayaquil, Ecuador	
5 km (road)	16:49	Jhoselyn Camargo	25 August 2019		São Paulo, Brazil	
10,000 m	34:09.54	Jhoselyn Camargo	29 May 2021	South American Championships	Guayaquil, Ecuador	
10 km (road)	33:40	Jhoselyn Camargo	5 November 2023	Argentinian 10km Road Running Championships	San Isidro, Argentina	
15 km (road)	51:39+	Jhoselyn Camargo	21 August 2022	South American Half Marathon Championships	Buenos Aires, Argentina	
Half marathon	1:12:51	Jhoselyn Camargo	21 August 2022	South American Half Marathon Championships	Buenos Aires, Argentina	
25 km (road)	1:28:45+	Jhoselyn Camargo	15 October 2023	Amsterdam Marathon	Amsterdam, Netherlands	
30 km (road)	1:46:27+	Jhoselyn Camargo	15 October 2023	Amsterdam Marathon	Amsterdam, Netherlands	
Marathon	2:32:37	Jhoselyn Camargo	15 October 2023	Amsterdam Marathon	Amsterdam, Netherlands	
24-hour run	150.000 km	Jessica Ribera	22 May 2022		Termas de Río Hondo, Argentina	
100 m hurdles	14.47 A (+1.1 m/s)	Camila Jimenez	3 June 2023		Cochabamba, Bolivia	
400 m hurdles	1:00.24 A	Cecilia Gomez	14 May 2017		Tarija, Bolivia	
400 m hurdles	1:00.06 A (Note: not ratified by FAB but recognized by World Athletics)	Alisón Sánchez	20 May 2012		Sucre, Bolivia	
3000 m steeplechase	10:11.01	Tania Chavez Moser	25 August 2018		Trujillo, Peru	
High jump	1.74 m A	Carla Rios	29 May 2022		Cochabamba, Bolivia	
Pole vault	2.55 m A	Maria del Carmen Paredes	14 May 2006		Cochabamba, Bolivia	
Pole vault	2.55 m A	Samira Lizarraga	20 August 2022		Cochabamba, Bolivia	
Long jump	6.09 m A (−0.3 m/s)	Valeria Quispe	4 June 2017		Tarija, Bolivia	
Triple jump	13.37 m (+0.2 m/s)	Valeria Quispe	7 June 2018	South American Games	Cochabamba, Bolivia	
Shot put	15.42 m A	Grace Conley	18 April 2015	Bolivian Junior Championships	Tarija, Bolivia	
Discus throw	38.29 m A	Ana Mendez	23 June 2019		Cochabamba, Bolivia	
Hammer throw	50.21 m A	Natalia Valda	27 July 2002		Sucre, Bolivia	
Javelin throw	42.13 m A	Natalia Chávez	5 May 2013		Cochabamba, Bolivia	
Heptathlon	4539 pts h A	Daisy Ugarte	22–23 July 2005	South American Championships	Cali, Colombia	
Heptathlon	100m H / High jump / Shot put / 200m / Long jump / Javelin / 800m; 15.84 (Note: by FAB source; 15.6 h by World Athletics source) / 1.52 m / 8.74 m / 25.86 / 5.45 m / 24.62 m / 2:18.47					
Heptathlon	4744 pts A	Daisy Ugarte	9–10 July 2005		La Paz, Bolivia	
Heptathlon	100m H / High jump / Shot put / 200m / Long jump / Javelin / 800m					
5000 m walk (track)	23:38.6	Geovana Irusta	3 September 1994		Santa Fe, Argentina	
10,000 m walk (track)	45:59.95	Geovana Irusta	20 May 2000		Rio de Janeiro, Brazil	
10 km walk (road)	45:03	Geovana Irusta	19 April 1997		Poděbrady, Czech Republic	
15 km walk (road)	1:07:52+	Ángela Castro	7 May 2016	World Race Walking Team Championships	Rome, Italia	
20,000 m walk (track)	1:32:35.2 h	Ángela Castro	24 June 2017	South American Championships	Luque, Paraguay	
20 km walk (road)	1:30:33	Ángela Castro	7 May 2016	World Race Walking Team Championships	Rome, Italia	
35 km walk (road)	3:06:13	Casandra Nieto	6 February 2022		Lima, Peru	
50 km walk (road)	5:48:56 (Note: not ratified by FAB but recognized by World Athletics)	Casandra Nieto	25 February 2018	IAAF Race Walking Challenge	Monterrey, Mexico	
4 × 100 m relay	45.54 A	Bolivia; Lauren Mendoza; Leticia Arispe; Valeria Quispe; Guadalupe Torrez	3 June 2023	Grand Prix Sudamericano Mario Paz Biruert	Cochabamba, Bolivia	
4 × 400 m relay	3:42.11 A	Bolivia; Marysabel Romero; Leslie Fernanda Arnéz; Daisy Ugarte; Álison Sánchez	25 November 2009	Bolivarian Games	Sucre, Bolivia	

=== Mixed ===
Event	Record	Athlete	Date	Meet	Place	Ref.
4 × 400 m relay	3:38.17 A (Note: ratified by FAB but not recognized by World Athletics)	Club Atlético Ciclón; Omar Sotomayor; Emily Zurita; Lucía Sotomayor; Julián Vargas	31 October 2021		La Paz, Bolivia	
4 × 400 m relay	3:36.53	Bolivia; Cecilia Gómez; Leandro Daza; Lucia Sotomayor; Ramiro Ulunque	5 December 2025	Bolivarian Games	Lima, Peru	

== Indoor ==
=== Men ===
Event	Record	Athlete	Date	Meet	Place	Ref.
60 m	6.80 A	Tito Hinojosa	5 February 2022		Cochabamba, Bolivia	
200 m	21.74 A	Tito Hinojosa	5 February 2021	Bolivian Championships	Cochabamba, Bolivia	
400 m	48.06 A	Fernando Copa	1 February 2020	South American Championships	Cochabamba, Bolivia	
800 m	1:50.12	Fadrique Iglesias	16 February 2008		Valencia, Spain	
1000 m	2:28.60	Samuel De la Riva	31 January 2025	Penn State National Open	State College, United States	
1500 m	3:51.20 A	David Ninavia	28 February 2026	South American Championships	Cochabamba, Bolivia	
3000 m	8:27.51 A	Juan Gonzalez	19 January 2020		Cochabamba, Bolivia	
3000 m	8:26.73 A	David Ninavia	28 January 2024	South American Championships	Cochabamba, Bolivia	
60 m hurdles	8.18 A	Mauricio Sandoval	1 February 2020	South American Championships	Cochabamba, Bolivia	
High jump	1.95 m A	José Camacho	6 February 2022		Cochabamba, Bolivia	
Pole vault	2.70 m A (Note: not ratified by FAB but recognized by World Athletics)	Thais Stilma	18 January 2020		Cochabamba, Bolivia	
Long jump	7.31 m A	Erick Suarez	1 February 2020	South American Championships	Cochabamba, Bolivia	
Triple jump	14.32 m A	Miguel Alfaro	19 January 2020		Cochabamba, Bolivia	
Shot put	18.73 m A	Aldo González	1 February 2020	South American Championships	Cochabamba, Bolivia	
Heptathlon						
Heptathlon	60m / Long jump / Shot put / High jump / 60m H / Pole vault / 1000m					
5000 m walk						
4 × 400 m relay	3:24.86 A (Note: ratified by FAB but not recognized by World Athletics)	Nery Penaloza; Mikhail Maldonado; Omar Sotomayor; Tito Hinojosa	5 February 2021		Cochabamba, Bolivia	
4 × 400 m relay	3:25.61 A (Note: recognized by World Athletics)	Copa; Abán; Tito Hinojosa; Vargas	2 February 2020		Cochabamba, Bolivia	
4 × 400 m relay	3:17.87 A	Bolivia; Ariel Hinojosa; Manuel Gareca; Alberto Antelo; Armando Penaloza	20 February 2022	South American Championships	Cochabamba, Bolivia	

=== Women ===
Event	Record	Athlete	Date	Meet	Place	Ref.
60 m	7.56 A	Leticia Arispe	19 February 2022		Cochabamba, Bolivia	
200 m	24.69 A	Cecilia Gómez	5 February 2021		Cochabamba, Bolivia	
400 m	55.48 A	Cecilia Gómez	5 February 2022		Cochabamba, Bolivia	
800 m	2:11.45 (Note: ratified by FAB but not recognized by World Athletics)	Nicole Vaca	6 December 2019		Michigan, United States	
800 m	2:17.07 (Note: recognized by World Athletics; sourced by WA Profile)	Nicole Vaca	2 March 2019	Wartburg Qualifier	Waverly, United States	
800 m	2:20.68 A (Note: recognized by World Athletics; sourced by WA Statistic Handbook 2022)	Nicole Vaca	2 February 2020	South American Championships	Cochabamba, Bolivia	
1000 m	2:51.14	Niusha Mancilla	7 February 2003		Zaragoza, Spain	
1500 m	4:20.16	Niusha Mancilla	5 March 1999	World Championships	Maebashi, Japan	
3000 m	9:28.98	Jhoselyn Camargo	18 March 2022	World Championships	Belgrade, Serbia	
60 m hurdles	8.97 A	Thaynara Zoch	6 February 2022		Cochabamba, Bolivia	
High jump	1.74 m	Carla Rios	15 May 2021		Santa Cruz de la Sierra, Bolivia	
Pole vault						
Long jump	6.04 m A	Valeria Quispe	5 February 2022		Cochabamba, Bolivia	
Triple jump	13.12 m A	Valeria Quispe	2 February 2020 (Note: by World Athletics source; 5 February 2022 by FAB source, a typo)	South American Championships	Cochabamba, Bolivia	
Shot put	8.73 m (Note: not ratified by FAB but recognized by World Athletics)	Abigail Phillips	4 February 2017		Marion, United States	
Pentathlon	3124 pts (Note: not ratified by FAB but recognized by World Athletics)	Abigail Phillips	17 February 2017		Marion, United States	
Pentathlon	60m H / High jump / Shot put / Long jump / 800m; 9.87 / 1.53 m / 8.37 m / 5.29 m / 2:31.96					
Pentathlon	3148 pts OT	Abigail Phillips	2 March 2017		Johnson City, United States	
Pentathlon	60m H / High jump / Shot put / Long jump / 800m; 9.51 / 1.52 m / 8.33 m / 5.08 m / 2:29.73					
3000 m walk						
4 × 400 m relay	3:59.41 A	Bolivia; Lucía Sotomayor; Eliana Cabrera; Leticia Arispe; Cecilia Gómez	5 February 2022		Cochabamba, Bolivia	
4 × 400 m relay	3:47.37 A	Bolivia; Lucía Sotomayor; Mariana Arce; Norelia Guasace; Cecilia Gómez	20 February 2022	South American Championships	Cochabamba, Bolivia	
