= Bolivia at the 1936 Summer Olympics =

- The flag of Bolivia
- IOC code: BOL
- NOC: Bolivian Olympic Committee

in Berlin
- Competitors: 1 in 1 sport
- Flag bearer: Alberto Conrad
- Medals: Gold 0 Silver 0 Bronze 0 Total 0

Summer Olympics appearances (overview)
- 1936; 1948–1960; 1964; 1968; 1972; 1976; 1980; 1984; 1988; 1992; 1996; 2000; 2004; 2008; 2012; 2016; 2020; 2024

Bolivia at the 1936 Summer Olympics in Berlin, Germany from 1–16 August 1936 was the nation's first appearance out of ten editions of the Summer Olympic Games. Bolivia sent to the 1936 Summer Olympics its first national team of one male athlete, Alberto Conrad, under the auspices of the Bolivian Olympic Committee (Spanish: Comité Olímpico Boliviano - COB). Conrad was the flag bearer, and he was a swimmer who competed in the men's 100 meter freestyle, where he was eliminated during the heats. Bolivia would return to the Summer Olympics at the fifteenth edition in 1964, although a team was sent to the 1956 Winter Olympics.

== Background ==
The Bolivian Olympic Committee was recognized by the International Olympic Committee on 31 December 1935. This was Bolivia's first appearance at any edition of the Olympic Games from 1896 to 1932. The 1936 Summer Olympics were held from 1–16 August 1936 in Berlin, Germany; a total of 3,963 athletes participated, representing 49 countries. The Bolivian delegation consisted of a single competitor, Alberto Conrad. He was the flag bearer for the opening ceremony. Bolivia made their next appearance at a Summer Olympics at the 1964 Summer Olympics although they did send a team to the 1956 Winter Olympics.

== Swimming ==
Alberto Conrad was 26 years old at the time of the Berlin Olympics, and was making his only Olympic appearance. In the first round of the men's 100 meters freestyle he was drawn into heat 2. He completed the race in a time of 1 minute and 17.5 seconds, which was seventh and last in his heat; only the top two from each heat and the two next fastest overall were permitted to advance, and Conrad was eliminated; the slowest qualifying time in his heat was 1 minute and 1 second. Conrad was the slowest of all 45 competitors, and nearly ten seconds behind 44th place, Spyridon Mavrogiorgos of Greece. The gold medal was won by Ferenc Csik of Hungary in a time of 57.6 seconds. The silver was won by Masanori Yusa and the bronze by Shigeo Arai, both of Japan.

Athlete	Event	Heat		Semifinal		Final	
Athlete	Event	Time	Rank	Time	Rank	Time	Rank
Alberto Conrad	Men's 100 m freestyle	1:17.5	7	Did not advance			

- Note: Ranks are given within a swimmer's heat only.
