= Bleyer =

Bleyer is a surname. Notable people with the surname include:

- Archie Bleyer (1909–1989), American bandleader and music industry executive
- Eugen-Heinrich Bleyer (1896–1979), German Wehrmacht general
- Julius Mount Bleyer (1859–1915), American physician
- Kevin Bleyer, American comedy writer
- Klara Bleyer (born 2004), German synchronised swimmer
- Pedro Bleyer (born 1968), Bolivian fencer
- Vanessa Bleyer (born 1975 or 1976), Australian politician

== See also ==
- Bleier
- Bleiler
