= Bolivia at the 2012 Summer Olympics =

- IOC code: BOL
- NOC: Bolivian Olympic Committee
- Website: www.cobol.org.bo (in Spanish)

in London
- Competitors: 5 in 3 sports
- Flag bearers: Karen Torrez (opening); Claudia Balderrama (closing)
- Medals: Gold 0 Silver 0 Bronze 0 Total 0

Summer Olympics appearances (overview)
- 1936; 1948–1960; 1964; 1968; 1972; 1976; 1980; 1984; 1988; 1992; 1996; 2000; 2004; 2008; 2012; 2016; 2020; 2024

Bolivia competed at the 2012 Summer Olympics in London, United Kingdom from 27 July to 12 August 2012. Comité Olímpico Boliviano sent a total of 5 athletes to the Games, 3 men and 2 women, to compete only in athletics, shooting, and swimming; all of them had competed in their first Olympics. Three athletes were selected by Universality places, without having qualified. More than half of them were under the age of 25; thus, many of them were expected to reach their peak in time for the 2016 Summer Olympics in Rio de Janeiro. Freestyle swimmer Karen Torrez was the nation's flag bearer at the opening ceremony. Bolivia, however, has yet to win its first Olympic medal.

== Athletics ==
Athletes have so far achieved qualifying standards in the following athletics events (up to a maximum of 3 athletes in each event at the 'A' Standard, and 1 at the 'B' Standard):

Key

- Note – Ranks given for track events are within the athlete's heat only
- Q = Qualified for the next round
- q = Qualified for the next round as a fastest loser or, in field events, by position without achieving the qualifying target
- NR = National record
- N/A = Round not applicable for the event
- Bye = Athlete not required to compete in round

Men

Athlete	Event	Heat		Quarterfinal		Semifinal		Final	
Athlete	Event	Result	Rank	Result	Rank	Result	Rank	Result	Rank
Bruno Rojas	100 m	10.62	1 Q	10.65	8	did not advance			

Women

Athlete	Event	Final	
Athlete	Event	Result	Rank
Claudia Balderrama	20 km walk	1:33:28	33

== Shooting ==
Men

Athlete	Event	Qualification		Final	
Athlete	Event	Points	Rank	Points	Rank
Juan Carlos Pérez	Trap	110	31	did not advance	

== Swimming ==
Men

Athlete	Event	Heat		Semifinal		Final	
Athlete	Event	Time	Rank	Time	Rank	Time	Rank
Andrew Rutherfurd	100 m freestyle	52.57	41	did not advance			

Women

Athlete	Event	Heat		Semifinal		Final	
Athlete	Event	Time	Rank	Time	Rank	Time	Rank
Karen Torrez	100 m freestyle	57.78	37	did not advance			

== See also ==
- Bolivia at the 2011 Pan American Games
