= Mauricio Prudencio =

Bolivian swimmer

Personal information
- Full name: Carlos Mauricio Prudencio Oliva
- Nationality: Bolivia
- Born: February 24, 1980 (age 46)
- Height: 1.84 m (6 ft 1/2 in)
- Weight: 69 kg (152 lb)

Sport
- Sport: Swimming
- Strokes: Freestyle and backstroke

Carlos Mauricio Prudencio Oliva (born February 24, 1980) is a retired male Olympic backstroke swimmer from Bolivia. He swam for Bolivia at the:

- Olympics: 2000, 2004
- World Championships: 2003

In 2001, he set the Bolivian Records in the long course 50 and 100 backstroke (27.85 and 59.90), and in 2003 he set the national marks in the long course 200 back (2:10.87), and at the same meet in Spain, all 3 short course backstroke marks (26.14, 56.79 and 2:02.26).
