= Athletics at the 1991 Pan American Games – Men's 10,000 metres =

Men's 10,000 metres at the Pan American Games

The men's 10,000 metres event at the 1991 Pan American Games was held in Havana, Cuba on 10 August.

== Results ==
Rank	Name	Nationality	Time	Notes
1st place, gold medalist(s)	Martín Pitayo	Mexico	29:45.49	
2nd place, silver medalist(s)	Ángel Rodríguez	Cuba	29:54.41	
3rd place, bronze medalist(s)	Juan Jesús Linares	Cuba	30:09.58	
4	José Antonio Morales	Guatemala	30:14.90	
5	Bo Reed	United States	30:36.04	
6	Gerardo Alcalá	Mexico	30:49.54	
7	José Luis Molina	Costa Rica	31:03.83	
8	Policarpio Calizaya	Bolivia	31:17.94	
9	Miguel Vargas	Costa Rica	31:34.39	
10	Jeff Cannada	United States	32:01.37	
11	John Castellano	Canada	32:08.67	
12	Jean Frantz	Haiti	34:44.44	
13	Jean Dieujuste Gedeon	Haiti	35:01.76	
	José Castillo	Peru	DNF	
	Antonio Silio	Argentina	DNS	
