= Bleier =

Bleier is a surname. Notable persons with the surname include:

- Bob Bleier (born 1964), American football quarterback
- Edward Bleier (1929–2023), American television executive
- Kimberly Anne Bleier, the 1983 Miss U.S. International
- Richard Bleier (born 1987), American baseball pitcher
- Rocky Bleier (born 1946), American football running back
- Ruth Bleier (1923–1988), American neurophysiologist
- Sheffy Bleier (born c. 1964), Israeli photographer and educator

== See also ==
- Bleiler
- Bleyer
