= Vidal Basco =

Bolivian long-distance runner

Personal information
- Full name: Vidal Basco Mamani
- Born: 8 February 1996 (age 30) Soracachi, Oruro Department, Bolivia
- Height: 1.65 m (5 ft 5 in)
- Weight: 55 kg (121 lb)

Sport
- Sport: Athletics
- Event(s): 5000 m, 10,000 m

Vidal Basco Mamani (born 8 February 1996) is a Bolivian long-distance runner. He won a bronze medal in the 10,000 metres at the 2019 South American Championships. He currently holds national records in the 5000 and 10,000 metres.

In December 2023, Bosco was served with a four-year ban backdated to July 2023 for an anti-doping rule violation after testing positive for clenbuterol in October 2022.

== International competitions ==
| Year | Competition | Venue | Position | Event | Notes |
Representing Bolivia
| 2015 | Pan American Junior Championships | Edmonton, Canada | 4th | 5000 m | 14:39.73 |
| 2015 | Pan American Junior Championships | Edmonton, Canada | 2nd | 10,000 m | 30:50.08 |
| 2016 | South American U23 Championships | Lima, Peru | 4th | 5000 m | 14:41.92 |
| 2016 | South American U23 Championships | Lima, Peru | 3rd | 10,000 m | 30:05.63 |
| 2017 | South American Championships | Asunción, Paraguay | 5th | 5000 m | 14:26.77 |
| 2017 | South American Championships | Asunción, Paraguay | – | 10,000 m | DNF |
| 2017 | Bolivarian Games | Santa Marta, Colombia | 6th | 5000 m | 14:14.06 |
| 2017 | Bolivarian Games | Santa Marta, Colombia | – | 10,000 m | DNF |
| 2018 | South American Games | Cochabamba, Bolivia | 2nd | 5000 m | 14:32.58 |
| 2018 | South American U23 Championships | Cuenca, Ecuador | 2nd | 5000 m | 14:59.49 |
| 2018 | South American U23 Championships | Cuenca, Ecuador | 1st | 10,000 m | 31:14.72 |
| 2019 | South American Championships | Lima, Peru | 4th | 5000 m | 13:57.80 |
| 2019 | South American Championships | Lima, Peru | 3rd | 10,000 m | 28:52.32 |
| 2019 | Pan American Games | Lima, Peru | 4th | 10,000 m | 28:34.37 |
| 2021 | South American Championships | Guayaquil, Ecuador | 6th | 5000 m | 14:21.39 |
| 2022 | South American Indoor Championships | Cochabamba, Bolivia | 5th | 1500 m | 4:04.58 |
| 2022 | Ibero-American Championships | La Nucía, Spain | 9th | 3000 m s'chase | 8:52.18 |
| 2022 | Bolivarian Games | Valledupar, Colombia | 2nd | 5000 m | 14:35.21 |
| 2022 | Bolivarian Games | Valledupar, Colombia | 1st | 10,000 m | 29:40.80 |
| 2022 | South American Games | Asunción, Paraguay | 5th | 5000 m | 14:11.78 |
| 2022 | South American Games | Asunción, Paraguay | – | 10,000 m | DNF |

== Personal bests ==
Outdoor

- 3000 metres – 8:32.11 (Santa Cruz 2018)
- 5000 metres – 13:57.80 (Lima 2019) NR
- 10,000 metres – 28:34.37 (Lima 2019) NR
