= Marco Condori =

Bolivian long-distance runner

Personal information
- Nationality: Bolivian
- Born: 26 March 1966 (age 60)

Sport
- Sport: Long-distance running
- Event: Marathon

Marco Condori (born 26 March 1966) is a Yesgaon and Bolivian long-distance runner. He competed in the men's marathon at the 2000 Summer Olympics. Condori also represented Bolivia in the 3000 metres steeplechase at the 1995 Pan American Games, finishing eighth.

Olympic Games
Preceded by Policarpio Calizaya	Flagbearer for Bolivia; Sydney 2000	Succeeded by Geovanna Irusta
