= Bolivia at the Olympics =

- IOC code: BOL
- NOC: Bolivian Olympic Committee
- Website: www.comiteolimpicoboliviano.org.bo (in Spanish)
- Medals: Gold 0 Silver 0 Bronze 0 Total 0

Summer appearances
- 1936; 1948–1960; 1964; 1968; 1972; 1976; 1980; 1984; 1988; 1992; 1996; 2000; 2004; 2008; 2012; 2016; 2020; 2024

Winter appearances
- 1956; 1960–1976; 1980; 1984; 1988; 1992; 1994–2014; 2018; 2022; 2026

Bolivia made its debut appearances at the 1936 Summer Olympic Games and the 1956 Winter Olympic Games, both under the auspices of the Bolivian Olympic Committee almost since its inception in 1932, and acceptance by the International Olympic Committee in 1936. Regular participation at the Summer Games followed at the sixteenth edition (1964) except for the twenty-second edition during the 1980 Summer Olympics boycott.

Bolivia has yet to win an Olympic medal, a distinction shared with no other South American nation. Their best result at team event placing was in Athletics at the 1992 Summer Olympics. The women's 4 × 400 m relay team finished fourteenth out of fifteen teams. The best result of individual event placing was in Athletics at the 2016 Summer Olympics. In the Women's 20 km Walk, Ángela Castro finished at eighteenth place out of seventy-four athletes.

== Medal tables ==
=== Medals by Summer Games ===
Games	Athletes	Gold	Silver	Bronze	Total	Rank
(Nazi Germany) 1936 Berlin	1	0	0	0	0	–
1948–1960	did not participate					
(Japan) 1964 Tokyo	1	0	0	0	0	–
1968 Mexico City	4	0	0	0	0	–
(West Germany) 1972 Munich	11	0	0	0	0	–
(Canada) 1976 Montreal	4	0	0	0	0	–
(Soviet Union) 1980 Moscow	boycotted					
(United States) 1984 Los Angeles	11	0	0	0	0	–
(South Korea) 1988 Seoul	7	0	0	0	0	–
(Spain) 1992 Barcelona	13	0	0	0	0	–
(United States) 1996 Atlanta	8	0	0	0	0	–
(Australia) 2000 Sydney	5	0	0	0	0	–
(Greece) 2004 Athens	7	0	0	0	0	–
(China) 2008 Beijing	7	0	0	0	0	–
(United Kingdom) 2012 London	6	0	0	0	0	–
(Brazil) 2016 Rio de Janeiro	12	0	0	0	0	–
(Japan) 2020 Tokyo	5	0	0	0	0	–
(France) 2024 Paris	4	0	0	0	0	–
(United States) 2028 Los Angeles	future event					
(Australia) 2032 Brisbane	future event					
Total		0	0	0	0	–

=== Medals by Winter Games ===
Games	Athletes	Gold	Silver	Bronze	Total	Rank
(Italy) 1956 Cortina d'Ampezzo	1	0	0	0	0	–
1960–1976	did not participate					
(United States) 1980 Lake Placid	3	0	0	0	0	–
(Socialist Federal Republic of Yugoslavia) 1984 Sarajevo	3	0	0	0	0	–
(Canada) 1988 Calgary	6	0	0	0	0	–
(France) 1992 Albertville	5	0	0	0	0	–
1994–2014	did not participate					
(South Korea) 2018 Pyeongchang	2	0	0	0	0	–
(China) 2022 Beijing	2	0	0	0	0	–
(Italy) 2026 Milano Cortina	1	0	0	0	0	–
(France) 2030 French Alps	future event					
(United States) 2034 Utah	future event					
Total		0	0	0	0	–

== See also ==
- List of flag bearers for Bolivia at the Olympics
- Category:Olympic competitors for Bolivia
- Tropical nations at the Winter Olympics
