= Bleiler =

Bleiler is a surname. Notable persons with that surname include:

- E. F. Bleiler (1920–2010), American editor, bibliographer, and scholar of science fiction, detective fiction and fantasy
- Gretchen Bleiler (born 1981), American professional halfpipe snowboarder
- Richard Bleiler (born 1959), American bibliographer in science fiction, fantasy, and horror, crime, and adventure fiction

== See also ==
- Bleier
- Bleyer
