= Simon Breitfuss Kammerlander =

Austrian-born alpine ski racer (born 1992)

Personal information
- Born: 29 November 1992 (age 33) Zams, Austria

Skiing career
- Sport: Alpine skiing
- Club: Kondor
- Disciplines: Slalom, giant slalom
World Cup debut
23 October 2016 (age 23)

World Championships
- Medals: 0

World Cup
- Seasons: 5 – (2017–2019, 2021–2022)

Simon Breitfuss Kammerlander (born 29 November 1992) is an Austrian-born Bolivian alpine ski racer. Breitfuss Kammerlander specializes in the technical events of slalom and giant slalom. Breitfuss Kammerlander made his World Cup debut on 23 October 2016. Born in Austria, he emigrated to Bolivia and has represented the country internationally since 2017.

== Career ==
Breitfuss Kammerlander made his World Cup debut at the Sölden Giant slalom on 23 October 2016; he failed to qualify for the second run, finishing in 78th place. He competed for Bolivia at the 2017 Alpine World Ski Championships. He finished 46th in the Super-G and failed to finish the first run of the Giant slalom and Slalom. He competed for Bolivia at the 2018 Winter Olympics. Kammerlander was the country's flag bearer during the opening ceremony.

He represented Bolivia at the 2022 Winter Olympics.

== World Championship results ==
Year	Age	Slalom	Giant slalom	Super-G	Downhill	Combined
2017	24	DNF1	DNF1	46	—	—

Olympic Games
Preceded by Gabriel Castillo; Karen Torrez	Flagbearer for Bolivia; Beijing 2022	Succeeded by Héctor Garibay; María José Ribera
