= Hernán Cortez (weightlifter) =

Bolivian weightlifter

Personal information
- Nationality: Bolivian
- Born: 28 December 1961 (age 63)

Sport
- Sport: Weightlifting

Hernán Cortez (born 28 December 1961) is a Bolivian weightlifter. He competed in the men's middle heavyweight event at the 1988 Summer Olympics.
