= César Menacho (sport shooter) =

Bolivian sport shooter

Personal information
- Full name: César David Menacho Flores
- Nationality: Bolivia
- Born: 14 October 1964 (age 61) Santa Cruz de la Sierra, Bolivia

Sport
- Sport: Shooting
- Event: Trap

César David Menacho Flores (born October 14, 1964 in Santa Cruz de la Sierra) is a Bolivian sport shooter. At age forty-three, Menacho made his official debut for the 2008 Summer Olympics in Beijing, where he competed in men's trap shooting. He placed thirty-fourth out of thirty-five shooters in the two-day qualifying rounds, with a total hit of 106 targets. For being the oldest member of the team, Menacho became the nation's flag bearer at the opening ceremony.

Olympic Games
| Preceded by Geovanna Irusta | Flagbearer for Bolivia; Beijing 2008 | Succeeded by Karen Torrez |
