= Pedro Vaca =

Bolivian cyclist

Personal information
- Born: 22 April 1961 (age 65)

Cycling career
- Sport: Cycling

Pedro Vaca (born 22 April 1961) is a Bolivian former cyclist. He competed in two events at the 1992 Summer Olympics.
