= María Teresa Monasterio =

Bolivian weightlifter

Personal information
- Nationality: Bolivia
- Born: 15 October 1969 (age 56) Santa Cruz de la Sierra, Bolivia
- Height: 1.55 m (5 ft 1 in)
- Weight: 63 kg (139 lb)

Sport
- Sport: Weightlifting
- Event: 63 kg

María Teresa Monasterio (born 15 October 1969 in Santa Cruz de la Sierra) is a Bolivian weightlifter. At age forty-three, Monasterio made her official debut for the 2008 Summer Olympics in Beijing, where she competed in the women's middleweight category (63 kg). Monasterio placed seventeenth in this event, as she successfully lifted 63 kg in the single-motion snatch, and hoisted 78 kg in the two-part, shoulder-to-overhead clean and jerk, for a total of 141 kg.
