= Héctor Garibay =

Bolivian long-distance runner

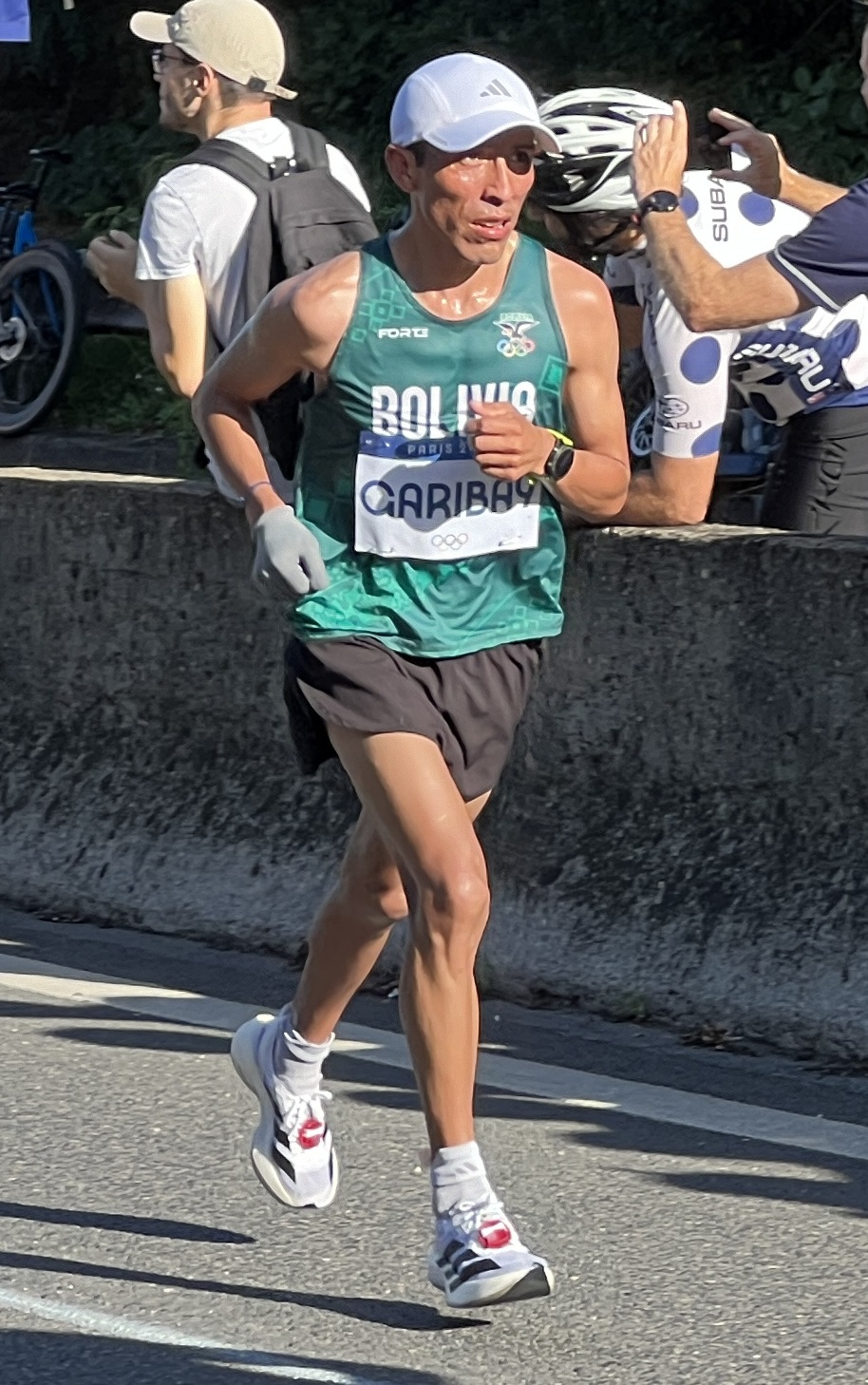
- 2024 Summer Olympics

Personal information
- Full name: Héctor Garibay Flores
- Nationality: Bolivian
- Born: 9 July 1988 (age 37) Totoral, Bolivia
- Height: 1.60 m (5 ft 3 in)
- Weight: 50 kg (110 lb)

Sport
- Sport: Track and field
- Event(s): 10,000 metres, Marathon
Medal record
South American Games
Bronze medal – third place	2022 Asunción	10,000 metres

Héctor Garibay Flores (born 9 July 1988) is a Bolivian long-distance runner who specialises in the marathon.

He finished 1st in the Marathon International of Mexico 2023 with an extraordinary time of 2:08:23, 1st place in Buenos Aires Marathon 2021 with a time of 2:11:58, 36th in the Marathon at the 2022 World Athletics Championships. In February 2023, he set a Bolivian record in the marathon running 2:07:44 at the Seville Marathon. This time qualified him for the 2024 Summer Olympics.

In 2023, he set the record of 2:08:23 in the Mexico City Marathon, beating the previous mark by more than two minutes.

== Personal bests ==
- 1500 metres – 4:02.80 (Cochabamba 2022)
- 3000 metres – 8:49.58 (Cochabamba 2022)
  - 3000 metres indoor – 8:43.95 (Cochabamba 2020)
- 5000 metres – 14:17.11 (Cochabamba 2019)
- 10,000 metres – 29:35.87 (Asunción 2022)
- Marathon – 2:07:44 (Sevilla 2023) NR
- Mexico City Marathon, 2:08:23 (Mexico 2023) MR

Olympic Games
Preceded by Simon Breitfuss Kammerlander	Flagbearer for Bolivia; Paris 2024 with María José Ribera	Succeeded by Incumbent
