= Saúl Mendoza (fencer) =

Bolivian fencer (born 1964)

Personal information
- Born: 31 December 1964 (age 61)

Sport
- Sport: Fencing

Saúl Mendoza (born 31 December 1964) is a Bolivian fencer. He competed in the individual foil and épée events at the 1984 Summer Olympics.
