= Marco Soria =

Bolivian cyclist

Personal information
- Born: 6 June 1953 (age 73)

Cycling career
- Sport: Cycling

Marco Soria (born 6 June 1953) is a Bolivian former cyclist. He competed in the individual road race and 1000m time trial events at the 1976 Summer Olympics.
