= Miguel Navarro (swimmer) =

Bolivian swimmer

Miguel Ángel Navarro
- Born: 14 January 1982 (age 44); Mar del Plata, Argentina
- Years active: 1996 - 2008
- Spouse: Helen Patricia Pantoja Serrano
- Children: Florencia Navarro Pantoja
- Parents: Miguel Angel Navarro (father); Mirta Susana Amantegui (mother)

Miguel Ángel Navarro is a Bolivian former competitive swimmer who holds a master's degree in Project Formulation and Management from Gabriel René Moreno Autonomous University (UAGRM). As a swimmer, he represented Bolivia at the 2008 Summer Olympics and competed at seven FINA World Championships between 2003 and 2009, including four long-course and three short-course championships.

== Swimming career ==
Navarro competed primarily in butterfly and freestyle events. According to an interview published in 2008, he set his first Bolivian national record in 2000 and by that year had accumulated approximately 50 Bolivian national records.

Between 2003 and 2009, he represented Bolivia at seven consecutive World Championships: Barcelona 2003, Indianapolis 2004, Montreal 2005, Shanghai 2006, Melbourne 2007, Manchester 2008 and Rome 2009.

=== World Championships ===
Among his World Championship appearances, his results within the top 50 of the overall rankings were:

| Year | Championship | Event | Place |
|---|---|---|---|
| 2004 | FINA World Swimming Championships (25 m), Indianapolis | 100 m butterfly | 46th (tie) |
| 2005 | FINA World Championships, Montreal | 100 m butterfly | 49th |
| 2006 | FINA World Swimming Championships (25 m), Shanghai | 50 m butterfly | 49th |
| 2006 | FINA World Swimming Championships (25 m), Shanghai | 100 m butterfly | 45th |
| 2008 | FINA World Swimming Championships (25 m), Manchester | 50 m butterfly | 46th |
| 2008 | FINA World Swimming Championships (25 m), Manchester | 100 m butterfly | 45th |

=== South American Games (ODESUR) ===
At the 2006 South American Games in Buenos Aires, Navarro reached the final of the men's 100-metre butterfly and finished sixth. In an interview published in 2008, he described the result as the best of his sporting career up to that point.

=== Olympic Games ===
In 2008, Navarro was a member of the Bolivian delegation at the 2008 Summer Olympics in Beijing. He competed in the men's 100-metre freestyle and finished 63rd in the overall rankings.
