= Paola Peñarrieta =

Bolivian swimmer

Personal information
- Born: May 16, 1969 (age 57)

Sport
- Sport: Swimming
- Club: Houston Cougars

Paola Peñarrieta (born 16 May 1969) is a Bolivian swimmer. She competed in three events at the 1992 Summer Olympics.
