= Armando Salvietti =

Bolivian sport shooter

Personal information
- Born: 10 January 1955 (age 71)

Sport
- Sport: Sports shooting

Armando Salvietti (born 10 January 1955) is a Bolivian former sports shooter. He competed in the trap and skeet events at the 1972 Summer Olympics.
