= Pedro Bleyer =

Bolivian fencer

Pedro Rodolfo
Personal information
- Full name: Bleyer Reyes Ortiz
- Nickname: Pedrito
- Nationality: Bolivian
- Born: 22 May 1968 (age 58) Santa Cruz, Bolivia

Sport
- Sport: Fencing

Achievements and titles
- Olympic finals: Olimpico

Pedro Bleyer (born 22 May 1968) is a Bolivian fencer. He competed in the individual sabre event at the 1988 Summer Olympics.
