= Jaime Sánchez (sport shooter) =

Bolivian sport shooter (born 1927)

Personal information
- Born: 17 July 1927

Sport
- Country: Bolivia
- Sport: Sports shooting

Jaime Sánchez (born 17 July 1927) is a Bolivian former sports shooter. He competed at the 1972 Summer Olympics and the 1976 Summer Olympics.
