= Ricardo Roberts =

Bolivian sports shooter (born 1917)

Personal information
- Born: 24 July 1917 La Paz, Bolivia

Sport
- Sport: Sports shooting

Ricardo Roberts (born 24 July 1917, date of death unknown) was a Bolivian sports shooter. He competed at the 1968 Summer Olympics and the 1972 Summer Olympics. Roberts is deceased.
