= Carlos Asbun =

Bolivian sports shooter

Personal information
- Born: 19 February 1926 Cochabamba, Bolivia

Sport
- Sport: Sports shooting

Carlos Asbun Zugbi (born 19 February 1926) is a Bolivian former sports shooter. He competed at the 1968 Summer Olympics and the 1972 Summer Olympics.
