= Gabriel Castillo =

Bolivian swimmer

Personal information
- Full name: Gabriel Alejandro Castillo Sulca
- Nationality: Bolivian
- Born: 24 April 2001 (age 25)

Sport
- Sport: Swimming

Gabriel Alejandro Castillo Sulca (Note: In this Spanish name, the first or paternal surname is Castillo and the second or maternal family name is Sulca.) (born 24 April 2001) is a Bolivian swimmer. He competed in the men's 100 metre backstroke at the 2020 Summer Olympics.

== Notes ==
Olympic Games
Preceded by Ángela Castro	Flagbearer for Bolivia; Tokyo 2020 with Karen Torrez	Succeeded by Simon Breitfuss Kammerlander
