= María José Ribera =

Bolivian swimmer

Personal information
- Born: 28 October 1996 (age 29) Santa Cruz de la Sierra, Bolivia

Sport
- Sport: Swimming

María José Ribera (born 28 October 1996) is a Bolivian swimmer. She competed in the women's 50 metre backstroke event at the 2017 World Aquatics Championships.

At the Paris 2024 Olympic Games, Ribera participated in the Women's 50 metre freestyle event on 3 August where she was initially recorded in 28th position. However she subsequently tested positive for furosemide and was retrospectively disqualified on 29 August. She was then issued with a provisional suspension by World Aquatics that commenced in October 2024.

In November 2025, the Court of Arbitration for Sport (CAS) issued Ribera with a 16-month ban backdated to October 2024 for the positive doping test which was deemed as unintentional. The CAS report revealed that her physician, Dr Matheus Das Neves Borgo, had erroneously requested for furosemide to added to a made-to-order supplement that Ribera subsequently used without sufficiently checking the ingredients. Dr Borgo received a six-year ban.

Olympic Games
Preceded by Simon Breitfuss Kammerlander	Flagbearer for Bolivia; Paris 2024 with Héctor Garibay	Succeeded by Incumbent
