= Luis Medina (swimmer) =

Bolivian swimmer (born 1973)

Personal information
- Born: 17 October 1973 (age 52)

Sport
- Sport: Swimming

Luis Medina (born 17 October 1973) is a Bolivian swimmer. He competed in three events at the 1992 Summer Olympics.
