= Alberto Conrad =

Bolivian swimmer

Personal information
- Born: March 26, 1910

Sport
- Sport: Swimming

Alberto Conrad Machuca (born March 26, 1910, date of death unknown) was a Bolivian freestyle swimmer who competed in the 1936 Summer Olympics. He was the first ever Olympic competitor for Bolivia and the Bolivian flag bearer at the Berlin Games. During the swimming competitions, he was eliminated in the first round of the 100 metre freestyle event.
