= Ángela Castro =

Bolivian racewalker (born 1993)

Personal information
- Full name: Ángela Melania Castro Chirivechz
- Born: 21 February 1993 (age 33) La Paz, Bolivia
- Height: 1.60 m (5 ft 3 in)
- Weight: 54 kg (119 lb)

Sport
- Country: Bolivia
- Sport: Athletics
- Event: Race walking
Medal record
Representing Bolivia
Women's athletics
South American Championships
Silver medal – second place	2019 Lima	20,000 m walk
Bronze medal – third place	2015 Lima	20,000 m walk

Ángela Melania Castro Chirivechz (born 21 February 1993) is a Bolivian race walker. She competed in the women's 20 kilometres walk event at the 2016 Summer Olympics finishing in 18th place. It was the best result ever for Bolivia in Olympic athletics. She was the flag bearer for Bolivia during both the opening ceremony and closing ceremony.

She competed at the 2020 Summer Olympics, in Women's 20 km walk. She won the 2021 Bolivian Race Walking Championship. She competed in the women's 20 kilometres walk at the 2022 World Athletics Championships held in Eugene, Oregon, United States.

Olympic Games
Preceded by Karen Torrez	Flagbearer for Bolivia; Rio 2016	Succeeded by Karen Torrez Gabriel Castillo
