= Juan Camacho (Bolivian athlete) =

Bolivian long-distance runner

Juan Rodrigo Camacho (born June 4, 1959) is a retired male long-distance runner from Bolivia, who represented his native country in three consecutive Summer Olympics, starting in 1984. He set his personal best (2:17.49) in the men's marathon on April 7, 1984 in Maassluis, Netherlands.

== Achievements ==
- All results regarding marathon, unless stated otherwise

Year	Competition	Venue	Position	Notes
Representing Bolivia
1984	Olympic Games	Los Angeles, United States	38th	2:21:04
1988	Olympic Games	Seoul, South Korea	69th	2:34:41
1992	Olympic Games	Barcelona, Spain	57th	2:26:01
