= Roberto Nielsen-Reyes =

Bolivian equestrian (born 1943)

Personal information
- Nationality: Bolivian
- Born: 15 February 1943 (age 82)

Sport
- Sport: Equestrian

Roberto Nielsen-Reyes Kurschner (born 15 February 1943) is a Bolivian equestrian. He competed at the 1968 Summer Olympics, the 1972 Summer Olympics and the 1976 Summer Olympics.
