= Geovana Irusta =

Bolivian racewalker

Personal information
- Full name: Geovana Irusta Morejon
- Nationality: Bolivia
- Born: 26 September 1975 (age 51) Sucre, Bolivia
- Height: 1.53 m (5 ft 0 in)
- Weight: 48 kg (106 lb)

Sport
- Sport: Athletics
- Event: Race walking

Achievements and titles
- Personal bests: 10 km walk: 45:03 (1997); 20 km walk: 1:32:06 (2004)

Geovana Irusta Morejon (born September 26, 1975 in Sucre) is a female Bolivian racewalker. She represented Bolivia in three editions of the Olympic Games (1996, 2000, and 2004), and has captured nine consecutive titles in both 10 and 20 km race walk at the South American Championships since her sporting debut in 1996. She also set a personal best of 1:32:06 (20 km race walk) from La Coruña Grand Prix in Spain.

Irusta made her official debut at the 1996 Summer Olympics in Atlanta, where she finished thirty-seventh in the women's 10 km race walk with a time of 47:13.

At the 2000 Summer Olympics in Sydney, Irusta came from behind the pack through the halfway mark to take the forty-second spot in the inaugural 20 km race walk at a personal best of 1:43.34.

Eight years after competing in her first Olympics, Irusta qualified for her third Bolivian team, as a 28-year-old, in the 20 km race walk at the 2004 Summer Olympics in Athens by attaining a B-standard entry time of 1:32:06 from La Coruña Grand Prix. She surpassed Ukraine's Vira Zozulya and held off United States' Teresa Vaill by a ten-second edge on the final lap to cross the finish line with a forty-first place time in 1:38:36. Building her own milestone as a three-time Olympian, Irusta was also appointed by the National Olympic Committee (Spanish: Comité Olímpico Boliviano) to carry the Bolivian flag in the opening ceremony.

At the 2007 Pan American Games in Rio de Janeiro, Irusta almost claimed a silver medal in a tight finish against El Salvador's Cristina López in the same program, but was disqualified by the officials for lifting a third time at the final lap.

Olympic Games
Preceded by Marco Condori	Flagbearer for Bolivia; Athens 2004	Succeeded by César Menacho
