= Fernando Inchauste =

Personal information
- Born: 18 June 1930 La Paz, Bolivia
- Died: 13 May 2006 (aged 75)

Sport
- Sport: Sports shooting, canoe sprinter

Fernando Inchauste (18 June 1930 – 13 May 2006) was a Bolivian canoe sprinter and sports shooter who competed from the mid-1960s to the early 1970s. As a sprint canoer, he was eliminated in the repechage round of the K-1 1000 m event at the 1964 Summer Olympics in Tokyo. Four years later in Mexico City, Inchauste did not finish his heat of the K-1 1000 m event.

In the 1972 Summer Olympics in Munich, he finished 86th in the small-bore rifle, prone event.
