= Karen Torrez =

Bolivian swimmer (born 1992)

Personal information
- Full name: Karen Milenka Torrez Guzmán
- Nationality: Bolivia
- Born: July 29, 1992 (age 33) Cochabamba, Bolivia
- Height: 1.65 m (5 ft 5 in)
- Weight: 58 kg (128 lb)

Sport
- Sport: Swimming
- Strokes: Freestyle
Medal record
Representing Bolivia
South American Games
Silver medal – second place	2018 Cochabamba	50 m freestyle
Silver medal – second place	2018 Cochabamba	100 m freestyle
Silver medal – second place	2018 Cochabamba	100 m butterfly
South American Championships
Bronze medal – third place	2016 Asunción	50 m freestyle
Bronze medal – third place	2018 Trujillo	50 m freestyle

Karen Milenka Torrez Guzmán (born 29 July 1992) is a Bolivian swimmer from Cochabamba. She competes in the Women's 100m Freestyle. She was flag bearer for the nation at the 2012 Summer Olympics.

She qualified to the 2019 Pan American Games during the 2018 South American Games.

In 2019, she represented Bolivia at the 2019 World Aquatics Championships in Gwangju, South Korea. She competed in the women's 50 metre freestyle and women's 100 metre freestyle events. In both events she did not advance to compete in the semi-finals.

Olympic Games
Preceded by César Menacho	Flagbearer for Bolivia; London 2012	Succeeded by Ángela Castro
Preceded by Ángela Castro	Flagbearer for Bolivia; Tokyo 2020 with Gabriel Castillo	Succeeded by Simon Breitfuss Kammerlander
