= Policarpio Calizaya =

Bolivian long-distance runner

Personal information
- Born: September 10, 1962 (age 63) La Paz, Bolivia

Sport
- Sport: Track and field
Medal record
Representing Bolivia
South American Games
Gold medal – first place	1994 Valencia	Marathon
Silver medal – second place	1986 Santiago	Marathon

Policarpio Calizaya Huaca (born September 10, 1962) is a Bolivian retired long-distance runner. He represented his native country in three consecutive Summer Olympics, starting in 1988. He was the oldest member at the 1996 Summer Olympics for Bolivia, and carried the flag at the opening ceremony. His sister Sonia Calizaya is also an Olympic marathon runner.

== Achievements ==
Year	Competition	Venue	Position	Event	Notes
Representing Bolivia
1983	South American Championships	Santa Fe, Argentina	6th	5000 m	14:22.8
1983	South American Championships	Santa Fe, Argentina	6th	10,000 m	29:45.0
1986	South American Games	Santiago, Chile	2nd	Marathon	2:27:44
1987	World Championships	Rome, Italy	—	Marathon	DNF
1988	Olympic Games	Seoul, South Korea	36th (h)	10,000 m	30:35.01
1991	South American Championships	Manaus, Brazil	10th	5000 m	14:53.55
1991	South American Championships	Manaus, Brazil	8th	10,000 m	31:04.7
1991	Pan American Games	Havana, Cuba	9th	5000 m	14:28.24
1991	Pan American Games	Havana, Cuba	8th	10,000 m	31:17.94
1992	Ibero-American Championships	Seville, Spain	11th	5000 m	15:08.59
1992	Ibero-American Championships	Seville, Spain	—	10,000 m	DNF
1992	Olympic Games	Barcelona, Spain	38th (h)	5000 m	15:02.02
1992	Olympic Games	Barcelona, Spain	45th (h)	10,000 m	30:27.01
1993	South American Championships	Lima, Peru	7th	10,000 m	30:03.1
1994	South American Games	Valencia, Venezuela	1st	Marathon	2:32:06
1995	Pan American Games	Mar del Plata, Argentina	17th	Marathon	2:30:41
1996	Olympic Games	Atlanta, United States	91st	Marathon	2:33:08
