= Katerine Moreno =

Bolivian swimmer (born 1974)

Personal information
- Full name: Katerine Moreno Mayser
- Born: 4 May 1974 (age 52) Santa Cruz de la Sierra, Bolivia
- Height: 1.82 m (5 ft 11 1/2 in)
- Weight: 71 kg (157 lb)

Sport
- Sport: Swimming
- Club: SAMIX, Santa Cruz

Katerine Moreno Mayser (born 4 May 1974 in Santa Cruz de la Sierra) is a retired swimmer from Bolivia. She is recognized for being the Bolivian athlete with the most participations in the Summer Olympics, having competed in four editions: Seoul 1988, Sydney 2000, Athens 2004, and Beijing 2008.

== Career ==
Moreno began swimming at the age of 9 in her school team at Santa Ana, and at 11 she competed in her first national championship in La Paz.

In the 1988 Seoul Olympics, with 14 years, she was the only woman in the Bolivian delegation and also the country's flag bearer. She competed in four events: 50 m freestyle, 100 m freestyle, 100 m backstroke, and 100 m breaststroke, improving her marks and breaking eight national records in junior and senior categories.

In subsequent Olympic editions, Moreno specialized in the 100 m breaststroke (Sydney 2000 and Athens 2004) and 50 m freestyle (Beijing 2008).

== Personal life ==
Moreno is married to José Quintanilla, a swimming coach, with whom she founded the Escuela de Natación Samix in 1998. They are parents of four children: José Alberto (27), Katerine (25), José Adrián (14), and María Jesús (11).

Her son José Alberto, who qualified for the 50 m freestyle at the 2016 Rio Olympics, becoming the first Bolivian male swimmer to compete with a qualifying time.
