= Bolivian Olympic Committee =

National Olympic Committee

- Country/Region: Bolivia
- Code: BOL
- Created: 1932
- Recognized: 1936
- Continental Association: PASO
- Headquarters: La Paz, Bolivia
- President: Marco Antonio Arze Mendoza
- Secretary General: Mario Ramiro Aramayo Fortun
- Website: www.comiteolimpicoboliviano.org.bo

The Bolivian Olympic Committee (Comité Olímpico Boliviano - COB) is the National Olympic Committee representing Bolivia in the International Olympic Committee (IOC), the Pan American Sports Organization (PASO), the Association of National Olympic Committees (ANOC) and the South American Sports Organization (ODESUR). It was created 1932 and recognized by the IOC in 1936.

It is based in La Paz, Bolivia.

== Member federations ==
The Bolivian National Federations are the organizations that coordinate all aspects of their individual sports. They are responsible for training, competition and development of their sports. There are currently 19 Olympic Summer and one Winter Sport Federations in Bolivia.

National Federation	Summer or Winter	Headquarters
Bolivian Athletics Federation	Summer	Cochabamba
Bolivian Basketball Federation	Summer	Cochabamba
Bolivian Boxing Federation	Summer	Santa Cruz de la Sierra
Bolivian Canoe Federation	Summer	La Paz
Bolivian Cycling Federation	Summer	Cochabamba
Bolivian Equestrian Federation	Summer	La Paz
Bolivian Fencing Federation	Summer	La Paz
Bolivian Football Federation	Summer	Cochabamba
Bolivian Gymnastics Federation	Summer	Cochabamba
Bolivian Judo Federation	Summer	La Paz
Bolivian Karate Federation	Summer	Sucre
Bolivian Ski and Mountaineering Federation	Winter	La Paz
Bolivian Shooting Federation	Summer	La Paz
Bolivian Swimming Federation	Summer	Sucre
Bolivian Table Tennis Federation	Summer	La Paz
Bolivian Taekwondo Federation	Summer	Santa Cruz de la Sierra
Bolivian Tennis Federation	Summer	Santa Cruz de la Sierra
Bolivian Volleyball Federation	Summer	La Paz
Bolivian Weightlifting Federation	Summer	La Paz
Bolivian Amateur Wrestling Federation	Summer	La Paz

== Social media ==
The COB is present on social media, with the Press Office of the Committee running an official Facebook page and Twitter account.

== See also ==
- Bolivia at the Olympics
- Bolivia at the Pan American Games
