= Swimming at the 1936 Summer Olympics – Men's 100 metre freestyle =

Men's 100 metre freestyle at the Games of the XI Olympiad
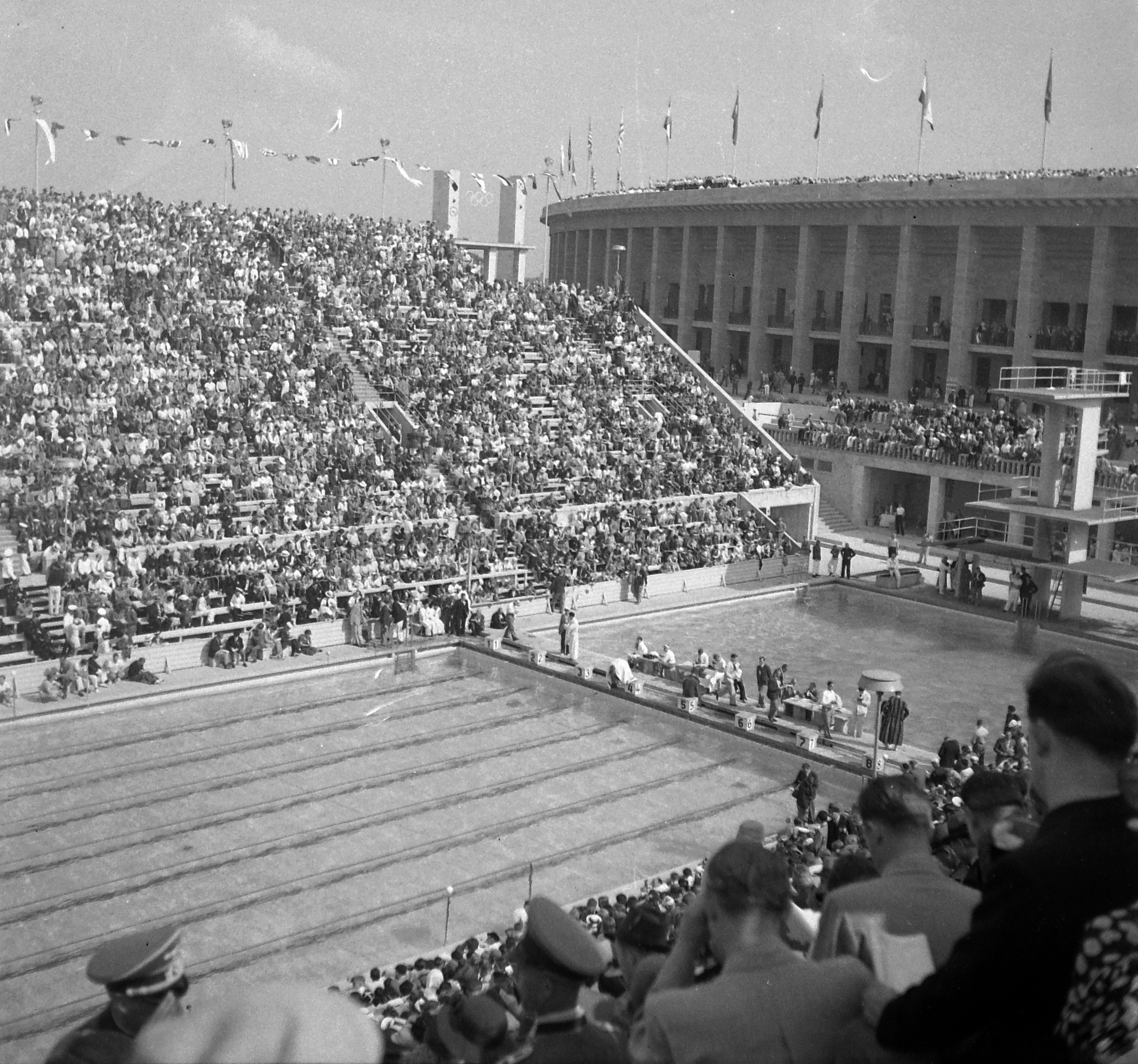
- Swimming at the 1936 Olympics
- Venue: Olympiapark Schwimmstadion Berlin
- Dates: 8 August 1936 (heats & semifinals); 9 August 1936 (finals)
- Competitors: 45 from 23 nations
- Winning time: 57.6

Medalists
1st place, gold medalist(s)		Ferenc Csik; Hungary
2nd place, silver medalist(s)		Masanori Yusa; Japan
3rd place, bronze medalist(s)		Shigeo Arai; Japan

The men's 100 metre freestyle was a swimming event held as part of the swimming at the 1936 Summer Olympics programme. It was the ninth appearance of the event, which had not been featured only at the 1900 Games. The competition was held on Saturday and Sunday, 8 and 9 August 1936. Forty-five swimmers from 23 nations competed. Nations had been limited to three swimmers each since the 1924 Games. The event was won by Ferenc Csik of Hungary, the nation's first victory in the event since 1904 and third overall (second all-time behind the United States with 5). For the second consecutive Games, Japan took two medals in the 100 metre freestyle, this time silver (Masanori Yusa) and bronze (Shigeo Arai). The United States' seven-Games medal streak in the event ended as the nation's best result was sixth place by Peter Fick.

== Background ==
This was the ninth appearance of the men's 100 metre freestyle. The event has been held at every Summer Olympics except 1900 (when the shortest freestyle was the 200 metres), though the 1904 version was measured in yards rather than metres.

None of the six finalists from 1932 returned. American Peter Fick, the world record holder, was a slight favorite. The Japanese team was strong once again. European champion Ferenc Csik of Hungary was considered a tier below the Americans and Japanese.

Bermuda, Bolivia, the Republic of China, Egypt, Estonia, Finland, and Peru each made their debut in the event. The United States made its ninth appearance, having competed at each edition of the event to date.

== Competition format ==
This freestyle swimming competition used a three-round (quarterfinals, semifinals, final) format. The advancement rule was a modification of the one used since 1912, allowing the top swimmers in each race plus one or more wild cards to advance. For this event, the top two in each preliminary heat plus the next two fastest swimmers would advance to the semifinals; the top three in each semifinal plus the fastest fourth-place swimmer would move on to the final. There were 7 heats of between 6 and 8 swimmers, allowing 16 swimmers to advance to the semifinals. The 2 semifinals had 8 swimmers each; 7 advanced to the final.

Each race involved two lengths of the 50-metre pool.

== Records ==
These were the standing world and Olympic records (in seconds) prior to the 1936 Summer Olympics.

World record	Peter Fick (USA)	56.4	New Haven, United States	11 February 1936
Olympic record	Yasuji Miyazaki (JPN)	58.0	Los Angeles, United States	6 August 1932

Peter Fick set a new Olympic record in the first heat with 57.6 seconds. In the fifth heat Masaharu Taguchi bettered the Olympic record with 57.5 seconds. Masanori Yusa equalized this record in the second semifinal with 57.5 seconds.

== Schedule ==
Date	Time	Round
Saturday, 8 August 1936	9:00; 15:00	Heats; Semifinals
Sunday, 9 August 1936	15:20	Final

== Results ==
=== Heats ===
Saturday 8 August 1936: The fastest two in each heat and the next two fastest from across the heats advanced to the semi-finals.

==== Heat 1 ====
Rank	Swimmer	Nation	Time	Notes
1	Peter Fick	United States	57.6	Q, OR
2	Ferenc Csik	Hungary	58.3	Q
3	Romund Gabrielsen	Great Britain	1:01.2	
4	Bob Hamerton	Canada	1:02.1	
5	Paulo Tarrto	Brazil	1:02.6	
6	Mahmoud Kadri	Egypt	1:03.8	
7	Arturo Álvarez	Peru	1:04.9	
8	Charlie Chan	Republic of China	1:06.5	

==== Heat 2 ====
Rank	Swimmer	Nation	Time	Notes
1	Masanori Yusa	Japan	57.8	Q
2	Arthur Highland	United States	59.9	Q
3	William Kendall	Australia	1:01.0	q
4	Egon Roolaid	Estonia	1:01.5	
5	René Cavalero	France	1:02.2	
6	Sjoerd Mooi Wilten	Netherlands	1:03.4	
7	Alberto Conrad	Bolivia	1:17.5	

==== Heat 3 ====
Rank	Swimmer	Nation	Time	Notes
1	Mostyn Ffrench-Williams	Great Britain	1:00.7	Q
2	Jikirum Adjaluddin	Philippines	1:01.0	Q
3	Heiko Schwartz	Germany	1:01.8	
4	Munroe Bourne	Canada	1:02.4	
5	Isaac Moraes	Brazil	1:03.5	
6	Günther Zobernig	Austria	1:03.9	

==== Heat 4 ====
Rank	Swimmer	Nation	Time	Notes
1	Shigeo Arai	Japan	57.7	Q
2	Helmuth Fischer	Germany	57.9	Q
3	Ödön Gróf	Hungary	1:01.3	
4	Leonard Spence	Bermuda	1:01.9	
5	Claude Desusclade	France	1:07.2	
6	Rikhardos Brousalis	Greece	1:07.5	

==== Heat 5 ====
Rank	Swimmer	Nation	Time	Notes
1	Masaharu Taguchi	Japan	57.5	Q, OR
2	John Christensen	Denmark	1:01.1	Q
3	George Larson	Canada	1:01.5	
4	Zaki Saad al-Dine	Egypt	1:03.7	
5	Juan Paz	Peru	1:05.6	
6	Spyridon Mavrogiorgos	Greece	1:08.2	

==== Heat 6 ====
Rank	Swimmer	Nation	Time	Notes
1	Draško Vilfan	Yugoslavia	1:00.5	Q
2	Hermann Heibel	Germany	1:01.4	Q
3	Frederick Dove	Great Britain	1:01.6	
4	José Obial	Philippines	1:01.7	
5	Leônidas da Silva	Brazil	1:03.3	
6	John Young	Bermuda	1:07.8	

==== Heat 7 ====
Rank	Swimmer	Nation	Time	Notes
1	Arthur Lindegren	United States	58.3	Q
2	Oszkár Abay-Nemes	Hungary	1:00.2	Q
3	Heikki Hietanen	Finland	1:01.0	q
4	Piet Stam	Netherlands	1:01.3	
5	Poul Petersen	Denmark	1:01.6	
6	Roger Zirilli	Switzerland	1:04.1	

=== Semifinals ===
Saturday 8 August 1936: The fastest three in each semi-final and the fastest fourth-placed from across the heats advanced to the final.

==== Semifinal 1 ====
Rank	Swimmer	Nation	Time	Notes
1	Masaharu Taguchi	Japan	57.9	Q
2	Ferenc Csik	Hungary	58.1	Q
3	Peter Fick	United States	58.2	Q
4	Helmuth Fischer	Germany	58.7	q
5	Heikki Hietanen	Finland	1:00.5	
5	Draško Vilfan	Yugoslavia	1:00.5	
5	Jikirum Adjaluddin	Philippines	1:00.5	
8	Mostyn Ffrench-Williams	Great Britain	1:01.0	

==== Semifinal 2 ====
Rank	Swimmer	Nation	Time	Notes
1	Masanori Yusa	Japan	57.5	Q, =OR
2	Shigeo Arai	Japan	57.9	Q
3	Arthur Lindegren	United States	58.7	Q
4	Arthur Highland	United States	59.4	
5	William Kendall	Australia	59.9	
6	Hermann Heibel	Germany	1:00.3	
7	Oszkár Abay-Nemes	Hungary	1:01.1	
8	John Christensen	Denmark	1:01.6	

=== Final ===
Sunday 9 August 1936:

Rank	Swimmer	Nation	Time	Notes
1st place, gold medalist(s)	Ferenc Csik	Hungary	57.6	
2nd place, silver medalist(s)	Masanori Yusa	Japan	57.9	
3rd place, bronze medalist(s)	Shigeo Arai	Japan	58.0	
4	Masaharu Taguchi	Japan	58.1	
5	Helmuth Fischer	Germany	59.3	
6	Peter Fick	United States	59.7	
7	Arthur Lindegren	United States	59.9	

== Results summary ==
Rank	Swimmer	Nation	Heats	Semifinals	Final	Notes
1st place, gold medalist(s)	Ferenc Csik	Hungary	58.3	58.1	57.6	
2nd place, silver medalist(s)	Masanori Yusa	Japan	57.8	57.5	57.9	=OR
3rd place, bronze medalist(s)	Shigeo Arai	Japan	57.7	57.9	58.0	
4	Masaharu Taguchi	Japan	57.5	57.9	58.1	OR
5	Helmuth Fischer	Germany	57.9	58.7	59.3	
6	Peter Fick	United States	57.6	58.2	59.7	
7	Arthur Lindegren	United States	58.3	58.7	59.9	
8	Arthur Highland	United States	59.9	59.4	Did not advance	
9	William Kendall	Australia	1:01.0	59.9	Did not advance	
10	Hermann Heibel	Germany	1:01.4	1:00.3	Did not advance	
11	Heikki Hietanen	Finland	1:01.0	1:00.5	Did not advance	
11	Draško Vilfan	Yugoslavia	1:00.5	1:00.5	Did not advance	
11	Jikirum Adjaluddin	Philippines	1:01.0	1:00.5	Did not advance	
14	Mostyn Ffrench-Williams	Great Britain	1:00.7	1:01.0	Did not advance	
15	Oszkár Abay-Nemes	Hungary	1:00.2	1:01.1	Did not advance	
16	John Christensen	Denmark	1:01.1	1:01.6	Did not advance	
17	Romund Gabrielsen	Great Britain	1:01.2	did not advance		
18	Ödön Gróf	Hungary	1:01.3	did not advance		
18	Piet Stam	Netherlands	1:01.3	did not advance		
20	George Larson	Canada	1:01.5	did not advance		
20	Egon Roolaid	Estonia	1:01.5	did not advance		
22	Frederick Dove	Great Britain	1:01.6	did not advance		
22	Poul Petersen	Denmark	1:01.6	did not advance		
24	José Obial	Philippines	1:01.7	did not advance		
25	Heiko Schwartz	Germany	1:01.8	did not advance		
26	Leonard Spence	Bermuda	1:01.9	did not advance		
27	Bob Hamerton	Canada	1:02.1	did not advance		
28	René Cavalero	France	1:02.2	did not advance		
29	Munroe Bourne	Canada	1:02.4	did not advance		
30	Paulo Tarrto	Brazil	1:02.6	did not advance		
31	Leônidas da Silva	Brazil	1:03.3	did not advance		
32	Sjoerd Mooi Wilten	Netherlands	1:03.4	did not advance		
33	Isaac Moraes	Brazil	1:03.5	did not advance		
34	Zaki Saad al-Dine	Egypt	1:03.7	did not advance		
35	Mahmoud Kadri	Egypt	1:03.8	did not advance		
36	Günther Zobernig	Austria	1:03.9	did not advance		
37	Roger Zirilli	Switzerland	1:04.1	did not advance		
38	Arturo Álvarez	Peru	1:04.9	did not advance		
39	Juan Paz	Peru	1:05.6	did not advance		
40	Charlie Chan	Republic of China	1:06.5	did not advance		
41	Claude Desusclade	France	1:07.2	did not advance		
42	Rikhardos Brousalis	Greece	1:07.5	did not advance		
43	John Young	Bermuda	1:07.8	did not advance		
44	Spyridon Mavrogiorgos	Greece	1:08.2	did not advance		
45	Alberto Conrad	Bolivia	1:17.5	did not advance		
