= Deaths in August 1998 =

The following is a list of notable deaths in August 1998.

Entries for each day are listed alphabetically by surname. A typical entry lists information in the following sequence:

- Name, age, country of citizenship at birth, subsequent country of citizenship (if applicable), reason for notability, cause of death (if known), and reference.

== August 1998 ==
=== 1 ===
- Joel Barr, 82, American spy for the Soviet Union.
- Eva Bartok, 71, Hungarian-British actress.
- Len Duncan, 87, American race car driver.
- Norman Kretzmann, 69, American academic, multiple myeloma.
- Josef Ludl, 82, Czech football player.
- France Mihelič, 91, Slovene painter.
- Ray Rigby, 49, Australian shot putter, weightlifter and Olympian (1968).

=== 2 ===
- Otto Bumbel, 84, Brazilian football player and coach.
- Mapy Cortés, 88, Puerto Rican actress, heart attack.
- Tommy Faile, 69, American songwriter and singer, heart attack.
- Jim Hadnot, 58, American basketball player (Oakland Oaks).
- Shari Lewis, 65, American ventriloquist and puppeteer, viral pneumonia.

=== 3 ===
- Ronnie Boon, 89, Welsh rugby player.
- Francesc Xavier Bultó, 86, Spanish businessman.
- Reizo Koike, 82, Japanese swimmer and Olympic medalist (1932, 1936), lung cancer.
- Alfred Schnittke, 63, German-Russian composer, complications from strokes.
- Alan Walsh, 81, British-Australian physicist, originator of atomic absorption spectroscopy.
- Joseph Putnam Willson, 96, American district judge (United States District Court for the Western District of Pennsylvania).

=== 4 ===
- Yury Artyukhin, 68, Soviet and Russian cosmonaut (Soyuz 14), and engineer, cancer.
- Carmen Delia Dipiní, 70, Puerto Rican singer.
- Richard Dunn, 54, British television executive.
- Thomas Joseph McDonough, 86, American prelate of the Roman Catholic Church.
- Al-Qarshi Abd ur-Raheem Salaam, 62, Yemeni poet and playwright.

=== 5 ===
- Arthur Ceuleers, 82, Belgian footballer.
- Keshab Chandra Gogoi, 72, Indian politician.
- Albert Johnson, 80, English rugby player.
- Otto Kretschmer, 86, German U-boat commander during World War II, boating accident.
- Britt Lindeborg, 70, Swedish lyricist, singer, composer and writer.
- Yevgeny Shabayev, 25, Russian artistic gymnast, heart attack.
- Eldon Shamblin, 82, American guitarist and arranger.
- Eugene L. Stewart, 78, American lawyer and law professor.
- Todor Zhivkov, 86, Bulgarian politician, president of Bulgaria, pneumonia.

=== 6 ===
- Henk Bosveld, 57, Dutch footballer, heart attack.
- Jack Brickhouse, 82, American sportscaster, heart attack.
- Francesco Capocasale, 81, Italian football player and coach.
- Jonas Gaines, 84, American baseball player.
- Nat Gonella, 90, English jazz trumpeter, bandleader and vocalist.
- André Weil, 92, French mathematician.
- Deng Zhaoxiang, 95, Chinese naval officer.

=== 7 ===
- Hamden Khalif Allah Awad, 27, Egyptian al-Qaeda terrorist, suicide bombing.
- Richard W. Fellows, 83, American Air Force officer.
- William Hiesey, 94, American botanist.
- Dick Offenhamer, 85, American football and baseball player and coach.
- Peggy Phango, 69, South African actress and singer.
- Harry Tuzo, 80, British army general.

=== 8 ===
- Sam Balter, 88, American basketball player, sportscaster, and Olympian (1936).
- Giulio Bresci, 76, Italian road racing cyclist.
- Raymond E. Brown, 70, American Catholic priest.
- Barbara Burke, 81, British and South African sprint runner and Olympic medalist (1936).
- Idella Jones Childs, 95, American historian and civil rights activist.
- Mossie Guttormsen, 82, Australian cricketer.
- Anna J. Harrison, 85, American organic chemist and professor of chemistry.
- Satoshi Murayama, 29, Japanese shogi player, bladder cancer.
- Walter Merlo, 33, Italian long-distance runner, mountaineering accident.
- Dagfinn Nilsen, 78, Norwegian football player and Olympian (1952).
- Germana Paolieri, 91, Italian actress.
- Jess Present, 77, American politician.
- László Szabó, 81, Hungarian chess grandmaster.
- Aang Witarsa, 67, Indonesian football player and Olympian (1956).

=== 9 ===
- Tony Baker, 53, American football player, traffic collision.
- Bjarne Bø, 91, Norwegian actor.
- Petro Denysenko, 77, Soviet Ukrainian Olympic pole vaulter (1952).
- Brynhild Haugland, 93, American politician.
- George Child Villiers, 9th Earl of Jersey, 88, English nobleman and politician, heart attack.
- Ray Moss, 96, American baseball player (Brooklyn Robins, Boston Braves).
- Frankie Ruiz, 40, Puerto Rican singer and songwriter, liver cirrhosis.
- Francisco Zúñiga, 85, Costa Rican-Mexican artist.

=== 10 ===
- Bekim Berisha, 32, Kosovar Albanian soldier, killed in action.
- Chuck Fenenbock, 79, American football player.
- Sidney W. Fox, 86, American biochemist.
- John Murphy, 47, Northern Irish loyalist, traffic collision.
- Premji, 89, Indian actor and social reformer.
- Habib Hassan Touma, 63, Palestinian composer and ethnomusicologist.

=== 11 ===
- Richard Bilby, 67, American district judge (United States District Court for the District of Arizona).
- Bud Cooper, 85, American gridiron football player (Cleveland Rams).
- Heinz Döpfl, 59, Austrian pair skater and Olympian (1960).
- Derek Newark, 65, English actor, heart attack following liver failure.
- Nicky Verstappen, 11, Dutch homicide victim
- Sergei Vonsovsky, 87, Soviet physicist.
- Benny Waters, 96, American jazz saxophonist and clarinetist.

=== 12 ===
- Dagoberto Borges, 58, Cuban Olympic fencer (1968).
- Jesús Loroño, 72, Spanish road racing cyclist.
- D. R. Nagaraj, 44, Indian writer and cultural critic.
- Gazi Shamsur Rahman, Bangladeshi lawyer, writer and television personality.
- C. Dickerman Williams, American lawyer and free-speech advocate.

=== 13 ===
- Sim Bok-seok, 69, South Korean long-distance runner and Olympian (1948).
- Nino Ferrer, 63, French singer, songwriter and author, suicide by gunshot.
- Edward Ginzton, 82, Ukrainian-American engineer.
- Julien Green, 97, American writer.
- Waneta Hoyt, 52, American serial killer, pancreatic cancer.
- Karl Hubenthal, 81, American cartoonist, cancer.
- Rafael Robles, 50, American baseball player (San Diego Padres).
- Saturday Rosenberg, 46, Australian comedian, writer and actress, traffic collision.

=== 14 ===
- Piet Bakers, 75, Dutch footballer.
- Eve Boswell, 76, British pop singer.
- Gary Evans, 43, American thief and serial killer, suicide by jumping.
- Doug Fleming, 68, Australian rugby league football player.
- Hans-Joachim Kulenkampff, 77, German actor and TV host, pancreatic cancer.
- Rosemary Martin, 61, English actress.
- Xavier Miserachs, 61, Spanish photographer, lung cancer.
- Chalmers Wylie, 77, American politician, member of the United States House of Representatives (1967-1993).

=== 15 ===
- Marc Akerstream, 44, Canadian actor and stuntman, head injuries from special effects explosion, head trauma.
- Marie Meierhofer, 89, Swiss children's psychiatrist and pedagogue.
- Károly Polinszky, 76, Hungarian chemical engineer and politician.
- Bill Shill, 75, Canadian ice hockey player (Boston Bruins).
- Paulo Tarrto, 83, Brazilian Olympic swimmer (1936).

=== 16 ===
- Dominique Davray, 79, French actress.
- Wallace Fowlie, 89, American writer and academic.
- Claire Horrent, 88, French Olympic swimmer (1928).
- Phil Leeds, 82, American actor (Rosemary's Baby, Ally McBeal, Ghost), pneumonia.
- Frank Lewis, 85, American wrestler and Olympic champion (1936).
- Alain Marion, 59, French flutist, and, heart attack.
- Jim Murray, 78, American sportswriter and Pulitzer Prize winner.
- Kenneth Stafford Norris, 74, American marine mammal biologist, conservationist, and naturalist.
- Norman Tustin, 79, Canadian ice hockey player (New York Rangers).
- Dorothy West, 91, American novelist and short-story writer.
- Jim Zeravich, 78, American basketball player (Syracuse Nationals).

=== 17 ===
- Robert B. Evans, 92, American automobile industry executive.
- Terry Garvin, 61, Canadian professional wrestler, cancer.
- Tameo Ide, 89, Japanese footballer.
- Władysław Komar, 58, Polish shot putter, actor, and Olympian (1964, 1968, 1972), traffic collision.
- Johnny Lipon, 75, American baseball player.
- Rita Roland, 83, German-born American film editor.
- Tadeusz Ślusarski, 48, Polish pole vaulter and Olympian (1972, 1976, 1980).
- Irwin Suall, 73, American socialist, civil rights activist, and investigator, emphysema.
- Ab de Vries, 85, Dutch footballer.

=== 18 ===
- Protima Bedi, 49, Indian model, landslide.
- Bernice Bing, 62, Chinese-American artist.
- Gerry Brown, 81, Canadian ice hockey player (Detroit Red Wings).
- Harry J. Cargas, 66, American scholar and author.
- Hoyt C. Hottel, 95, American chemical engineer and academic.
- Persis Khambatta, 49, Indian model and actress (Star Trek: The Motion Picture), heart attack.
- Joe Patanelli, 78, American basketball player (Minneapolis Lakers).
- Johann Rezac, 87, Austrian architect.
- Kurt Schütte, 88, German mathematician.
- Shane Shamrock, 23, American professional wrestler, altercation with police.
- Otto Wichterle, 84, Czech chemist.

=== 19 ===
- Vasili Arkhipov, 72, Soviet Navy officer during the Cuban Missile Crisis, kidney cancer.
- Anne Asquith, 81, British code breaker.
- Lawrence J. Fuller, 83, American Army major general, heart attack.
- Max Holste, 84, French aeronautical engineer.
- Boris Borisovich Kadomtsev, 69, Russian plasma physicist.
- Ilva Ligabue, 66, Italian operatic soprano.
- Terry Perdue, 57, British weightlifter and Olympian (1968, 1972).
- Sylvia Stahlman, 69, American soprano.
- Yuri Yappa, 70, Soviet and Russian theoretical physicist.

=== 20 ===
- Jimmy Brewster, 96, American gridiron football player.
- Vivian Brown, 56, American sprinter and Olympian (1964).
- Ivan Godlevsky, 90, Soviet and Russian painter.
- Gene Host, 65, American baseball player (Detroit Tigers, Kansas City Athletics).
- Oleg Prokofiev, 69, Soviet and Russian artist, sculptor and poet.
- Fred Sington, 88, American football and baseball player (Washington Senators, Brooklyn Dodgers).
- Haydée Tamzali, 91, Tunisian actress, writer, and filmmaker.
- Vu Van Mau, 84, last Prime Minister of South Vietnam.
- Robert W. Warren, 73, American district judge (United States District Court for the Eastern District of Wisconsin).

=== 21 ===
- Hans van Abeelen, 61, Dutch behaviour geneticist.
- Luis Dávila, 71, Argentine actor, heart attack.
- Franz Eisenach, 80, German flying ace during World War II and recipient of the Knight's Cross of the Iron Cross.
- John Stopford, 61, English rugby player.
- Juanita Kidd Stout, 79, American attorney and jurist.
- Wanda Toscanini, 90, Italian wife of pianist Vladimir Horowitz.
- Michiel Victor, 88, South African Olympic sports shooter (1960).

=== 22 ===
- Jack Briggs, 78, American actor.
- Sam Cooper, 89, American gridiron football player (Pittsburgh Pirates).
- Evelyn Denington, Baroness Denington, 91, British politician, heart failure.
- Sergio Fiorentino, 70, Italian classical pianist, heart attack.
- Elena Garro, 81, Mexican screenwriter, journalist, and novelist, heart attack.
- Minoru Murayama, 61, Japanese baseball player.
- Miloslav Příhoda, 75, Czech Olympic boxer (1948).
- Jimmy Skidmore, 82, English jazz tenor saxophonist.
- Woody Stephens, 84, American thoroughbred horse racing trainer, emphysema.

=== 23 ===
- Ahmet Hamdi Boyacıoğlu, 78, Turkish judge.
- Gail Bruce, 74, American football player (San Francisco 49ers).
- Nikolay Kolesov, 42, Russian footballer.
- Asadollah Lajevardi, Iranian conservative politician and warden, shot.
- Rolf Søder, 80, Norwegian film actor.
- John Woodcock, 44, American football player, heart attack.

=== 24 ===
- Alexey Anselm, 64, Russian theoretical physicist.
- Manuel Azcárate, 81, Spanish journalist and communist politician, cancer.
- Jerry Clower, 71, American stand-up comedian.
- Charles Diggs, 75, American politician, member of the United States House of Representatives (1955-1980), stroke.
- Manuel Álvarez Jiménez, 70, Chilean football player.
- E. G. Marshall, 84, American actor (12 Angry Men, Tora! Tora! Tora!, The Defenders), Emmy winner (1962, 1963), lung cancer.
- Gene Page, 58, American composer, arranger and record producer.
- Levan Sanadze, 70, Georgian athlete and Olympic medalist (1952).
- Georges Senfftleben, 75, French track cyclist.
- Jack Richard Williams, 88, American radio announcer and politician, cancer.

=== 25 ===
- Mildred L. Batchelder, 96, American librarian.
- Lamar Crowson, 72, American concert pianist and a chamber musician.
- Percy Foreman, 86, American defense attorney.
- Lee Gunther, 63, American film editor and co-founder of Marvel Productions, stroke.
- Harold Hairston, 76, American baseball player.
- Floyd K. Haskell, 82, American lawyer and politician, pneumonia.
- Vyacheslav Kochemasov, 79, Russian diplomat and politician.
- Allan Macartney, 57, Scottish politician, heart attack.
- Barbara Mandell, 78, British journalist, broadcaster, newsreader and travel writer.
- Bob Montgomery, 79, American boxer, complications from a stroke.
- Lennart Nyman, 81, Swedish football coach and sports administrator.
- Jerry Wayne Parrish, 54, United States Army corporal and defector, kidney failure.
- Lewis F. Powell, Jr., 90, American lawyer and jurist, pneumonia.
- Gabino Rodríguez, 70-71, Mexican Olympic cyclist (1948).
- Gagik Sargsyan, 72, Armenian historian.

=== 26 ===
- Genaro Ruiz Camacho, 43, American criminal, execution by lethal injection.
- Wade Domínguez, 32, American actor, model, singer and dancer, respiratory failure.
- Penny Edwards, 70, American actress, lung cancer.
- Remo Giazotto, 87, Italian musicologist, music critic, and composer.
- Bunty Greenland, 85, British Olympic alpine skier (1948).
- Jack Harlan, 81, American botanist, agronomist, and plant collector.
- Robert Huebner, 84, American physician and virologist, pneumonia.
- Jaanus Kuum, 33, Estonian-Norwegian racing cyclist, suicide.
- Margaret Potter, 72, British writer.
- Frederick Reines, 80, American physicist and winner of the Nobel Prize in Physics.
- Jackie Ridgle, 50, American basketball player (California Golden Bears, Cleveland Cavaliers).
- Ryūichi Tamura, 75, Japanese poet, essayist and translator, esophageal cancer.

=== 27 ===
- Babalu, 56, Filipino comedian and actor, liver cancer.
- Garry E. Brown, 75, American politician, member of the United States House of Representatives (1967-1979).
- Kelly Chan, 41, Singaporean windsurfer, traffic collision.
- Harry Jensen, 85, Australian politician.
- Hunter Johnson, 92, American composer.
- Gianni Hecht Lucari, 76, Italian film producer, and production manager.
- Syd Owen, 76, English football player and coach.
- Essie Summers, 86, New Zealand author.
- Margaret Dauler Wilson, 59, American philosopher and academic.

=== 28 ===
- George Büchi, 77, Swiss organic chemist and academic.
- Lu Dadong, 83, Chinese politician, governor of Sichuan province.
- Hirokazu Kobayashi, 69, Japanese aikido teacher.
- Henry Nyandoro, 28, Kenyan footballer.
- Rajarethinam Arokiasamy Sundaram, 93, Roman Catholic bishop.
- Jack Wright, 71, Australian politician and Deputy Premier of South Australia (1982-1985).
- Nikolai Vladimirovich Zateyev, 72, Russian submariner and Soviet Navy officer, lung cancer.

=== 29 ===
- Erik Asmussen, 84, Danish architect.
- Antoinette Becker, 78, French-German children's author.
- Richard Beebe, 68, American radio personality, lung cancer.
- Minerva Bernardino, Dominican Republic diplomat and feminist.
- Charlie Feathers, 66, American country music and rockabilly musician, stroke.
- John Langston Gwaltney, 69, American writer and anthropologist.
- Frances Hamerstrom, 90, American author, naturalist and ornithologist, cancer.
- Albert Michiels, 67, Belgian Olympic wrestler (1960, 1964).
- Ralph Pappier, 84, Argentine production designer, set decorator and film director.

=== 30 ===
- Archie Glen, 69, Scottish football player.
- Frits de Graaf, 72, Dutch footballer.
- Dan Kubiak, 60, American politician and businessman, cardiovascular disease.
- Mykhaylo Mykhalyna, 74, Soviet-Ukrainian football manager and coach.
- Denniz Pop, 35, Swedish DJ, music producer and songwriter, stomach cancer.
- Higazi Said, 81-82, Egyptian Olympic swimmer (1936).
- Irving Segal, 79, American mathematician.
- Toss Woollaston, 88, New Zealand painter.

=== 31 ===
- Óscar Carrasco, 70, Chilean footballer.
- Sabiha Gökçül Erbay, Turkish school teacher and politician.
- Jacques Mauchien, 72, French Olympic field hockey player (1960).
- Keith Oxlee, 63, South African rugby player, complications following surgery.
- Aage Poulsen, 79, Danish long-distance runner and Olympian (1948).
- Shigezō Sasaoka, 50, Japanese voice actor, typhoid fever.
- George Seeman, 82, American football player (Green Bay Packers).
