= Swimming at the 1936 Summer Olympics – Men's 4 × 200 metre freestyle relay =

Men's 4 × 200 metre freestyle relay at the Games of the XI Olympiad
- Venue: Olympiapark Schwimmstadion Berlin
- Date: 10 August 1936 (heats); 11 August 1936 (final)
- Competitors: 74 from 18 nations
- Teams: 18
- Winning time: 8:56.1 WR

Medalists
| 1st place, gold medalist(s) | | Masanori Yusa, Shigeo Sugiura, Masaharu Taguchi, Shigeo Arai | Japan |
| 2nd place, silver medalist(s) | | Ralph Flanagan, John Macionis, Paul Wolf, Jack Medica | United States |
| 3rd place, bronze medalist(s) | | Árpád Lengyel, Oszkár Abay-Nemes, Ödön Gróf, Ferenc Csik | Hungary |

The men's 4 × 200-metre freestyle relay was a swimming event held as part of the swimming at the 1936 Summer Olympics programme. It was the seventh appearance of the event, which was established in 1908. The competition was held on Monday and Tuesday, 10 and 11 August 1936.

Seventy-four swimmers from 18 nations competed.

Note: The International Olympic Committee medal database shows only these swimmers as medalists. Ralph Gilman and Charles Hutter swam for the United States in the semi-finals but were not credited with silver medals.

== Records ==
These were the standing world and Olympic records (in minutes) prior to the 1936 Summer Olympics.

| World record | 8:52.2 | (Japan) Masanori Yusa (Japan) Shozo Makino (Japan) Sunao Ishiharada (Japan) Hiroshi Negami | Tokyo (JPN) | 19 August 1935 |
| Olympic record | 8:58.4 | (Japan) Yasuji Miyazaki (Japan) Masanori Yusa (Japan) Hisakichi Toyoda (Japan) Takashi Yokoyama | Los Angeles (USA) | 9 August 1932 |

In the final the Japan set a new world record with 8:51.5 minutes.

== Results ==
=== Semifinals ===
Monday, 10 August 1936: The fastest two in each semi-final and the next two fastest from across the semi-finals advanced to the final.

==== Semifinal 1 ====
| Place | Swimmers | Time | Qual. |
|---|---|---|---|
| 1 | René Cavalero, Artem Nakache, Christian Talli, and Jean Taris (FRA) | 9:21.7 | QQ |
| 2 | Munroe Bourne, Bob Hamerton, Robert Hooper, and Bob Pirie (CAN) | 9:40.0 | QQ |
| 3 | Aluizio Lage, Leônidas da Silva, Manoel Villar, and Isaac Moraes (BRA) | 9:42.5 | |
| 4 | Jikirum Adjaluddin, Arsad Alpad, Nils Christiansen, and José Obial (PHI) | 9:45.8 | |
| 5 | Edmund Cooper, Leonard Spence, Dudley Spurling, and John Young (BER) | 10:50.5 | |
| 6 | Rikhardos Brousalis, Spyridon Mavrogiorgos, Panagiotis Provatopoulos, and Angelos Vlakhos (GRE) | 10:51.0 | |

==== Semifinal 2 ====
| Place | Swimmers | Time | Qual. |
|---|---|---|---|
| 1 | Ralph Gilman, Charles Hutter, Jack Medica, and Paul Wolf (USA) | 9:10.4 | QQ |
| 2 | Oszkár Abay-Nemes, Ferenc Csik, Ödön Gróf, and Árpád Lengyel (HUN) | 9:20.8 | QQ |
| 3 | Mostyn Ffrench-Williams, Romund Gabrielsen, Bob Leivers, and Norman Wainwright (GBR) | 9:30.8 | qq |
| 4 | Poul Petersen, Jørgen Jørgensen, Aage Hellstrøm, and John Christensen (DEN) | 9:39.6 | |
| 5 | Herbert Hnatek, Franz Seltenheim, Edmund Pader, and Günther Zobernig (AUT) | 10:58.4 | |
| 6 | Norbert Franck, Pierre Hastert, Marcel Neumann, and Georges Tandel (LUX) | 10:59.8 | |
| — | Kazimierz Bocheński, Helmut Barysz, Joachim Karliczek, and Ilja Szrajbman (POL) | DSQ | |

==== Semifinal 3 ====
| Place | Swimmers | Time | Qual. |
|---|---|---|---|
| 1 | Shigeo Arai, Shigeo Sugiura, Masaharu Taguchi, and Masanori Yusa (JPN) | 8:56.1 | QQ |
| 2 | Helmuth Fischer, Hermann Heibel, Wolfgang Heimlich, and Werner Plath (GER) | 9:21.4 | QQ |
| 3 | Björn Borg, Sten-Olof Bolldén, Sven-Pelle Pettersson, and Gunnar Werner (SWE) | 9:35.3 | qq |
| 4 | Draško Vilfan, Tone Gazzari, Zmaj Defilipis, and Tone Cerer (YUG) | 9:40.3 | |
| 5 | Higazi Said, Ibrahim Fadl, Mahmoud Kadri, and Saad El-Din Zaki (EGY) | 10:05.3 | |

=== Final ===
Tuesday, 11 August 1936:

| Place | Swimmers | Time |
|---|---|---|
| 1 | Masanori Yusa, Shigeo Sugiura, Masaharu Taguchi, and Shigeo Arai (JPN) | 8:51.5 WR |
| 2 | Ralph Flanagan, John Macionis, Paul Wolf, and Jack Medica (USA) | 9:03.0 |
| 3 | Árpád Lengyel, Oszkár Abay-Nemes, Ödön Gróf, and Ferenc Csik (HUN) | 9:12.3 |
| 4 | Alfred Nakache, Christian Talli, René Cavalero, and Jean Taris (FRA) | 9:18.2 |
| 5 | Werner Plath, Hermann Heibel, Wolfgang Heimlich, and Helmuth Fischer (GER) | 9:19.0 |
| 6 | Mostyn Ffrench-Williams, Romund Gabrielsen, Bob Leivers, and Norman Wainwright (GBR) | 9:21.5 |
| 7 | Munroe Bourne, Bob Hamerton, Robert Hooper, and Bob Pirie (CAN) | 9:27.5 |
| 8 | Björn Borg, Sten-Olof Bolldén, Sven-Pelle Pettersson, and Gunnar Werner (SWE) | 9:37.5 |
