= Charles Hutter =

American swimmer (1916–1989)

Charles George Hutter, Jr.
- Lt. Charles G. Hutter, Jr. with Detachment 101 in Burma, WWII photo circa 1943-44

Personal information
- Full name: Dr. Charles George Hutter, Jr.
- National team: United States
- Born: June 21, 1916 Pana, Illinois, U.S.
- Died: September 24, 1989 (aged 73) Los Angeles, California, U.S.
- Occupation: Orthopedic Surgeon
- Spouse: Bernice

Sport
- Sport: Swimming
- Strokes: Freestyle
- College team: Harvard University
- Coach: Harold S. Ulen (Harvard)

Dr. Charles George Hutter, Jr. (June 21, 1916 – September 24, 1989) was an American Orthopedic surgeon for over forty years and a former competition swimmer for Harvard University who helped the U.S. Men's Olympic swim team win a Silver medal in the 4x200 freestyle relay at the 1936 Summer Olympics in Berlin, Germany.

Hutter was born on June 21, 1916 in Pana, Illinois to Colonel Charles G. Hutter and Katherine Weiss Hutter.

In the 200 indoor freestyle, he was the 1937 American Amateur Athletic Union (AAU) Champion.

== Harvard University ==
Hutter attended and swam for Harvard University under Coach Harold S. Ulen, who from 1929-1959 led Harvard's swim program to national recognition. Hutter broke the Harvard record for the 220-yard freestyle in his first varsity race by two full seconds. He also had the distinction of anchoring Harvard's 200-yard relay team in that competition, breaking that Harvard record by close to 1.5 seconds. Unfortunately, he was unable to better his swimming competitors from Yale in the 1935 season. Hutter graduated Harvard in 1938, and as a Sophomore was the first Harvard swimmer to qualify for the Olympics in 1936.

As an exceptional addition to the Harvard Swim Team, he set records for Harvard in four freestyle distances in 1937, with three of the records remaining for almost twenty years. Two of those records came in the most thrilling meet in Harvard aquatic history, the 39-3 victory over Ivy League rival Yale University's swim team that halted Yale's undefeated record at 164. He captained Harvard's undefeated 1938 team, helped Harvard win two Eastern Intercollegiate Swimming League championships and enjoy its longest continuous winning streak of 23 victories.

== 1936 Berlin Olympic Silver medal ==
Hutter placed fifth in the 100 freestyle at the 1936 Olympic trials, but it was sufficient to make the U.S. Men's 1936 Olympic relay team as an alternate included in the full relay team of six swimmers.

Hutter swam with the second-place U.S. team in the first preliminary round of the men's 4×200-meter freestyle relay. Later in the event finals, the Japanese team took the gold medal with a new world record time of 8:51.5, touching a full ten seconds ahead of the America team of Ralph Flanagan, John Macionis, Paul Wolf, and Jack Medica who finished with a time of 9:03.0. Hutter was not eligible to receive a medal, because only swimmers who competed in the final round of the relay event received medals under the swimming rules in effect for the 1936 Olympics.

== Professional life ==
After graduating Harvard in 1938, and attending Harvard Medical School, he served in the U.S. Army Medical Corps as a Lieutenant, and later Lieutenant Colonel and after joining the Office of Strategic Services, the forerunner of the CIA, he served in China, Burma and India.

=== WWII Service ===
Hutter served with Burma's Detachment 101 contingent, the most accomplished OSS unit in WWII's China-Burma-India Theater. Beginning with only 25 troops, the unit grew to its capacity of close to 600 by the war's end, and recruited up to 11,000 native Kachin who fought the occupying Japanese forces. He operated behind the Japanese lines, and was awarded the Bronze Star for rescuing American servicemen. Later in China, he aided in the rescue of General Jonathan M. Wainwright, and provided medical attention to American POWs.

=== Post-war career ===
After the war, he was an Orthopedic Resident from 1946-1948 at the L.A. County and Mass General Hospitals, later opening his own office in Hollywood and North Hollywood. He was a former President of the Far West Medical Association, was a member of the American Academy of Orthopedic Surgeons, and was Chief of Staff at Hollywood Presbyterian Hospital, the Medical Center of Hollywood, and Burbank's St. Joseph Hospital.

He died September 24, 1989 in Los Angeles, California, and was survived by his wife Bernice, and sons Charles George Hutter III, and Peter Schuyler Hutter. Memorial services were held September 29 at All Saints' Episcopal Church in Beverly Hills, California.

== See also ==
- List of Harvard University people
