= Árpád Lengyel (swimmer) =

Hungarian swimmer (1915–1993)

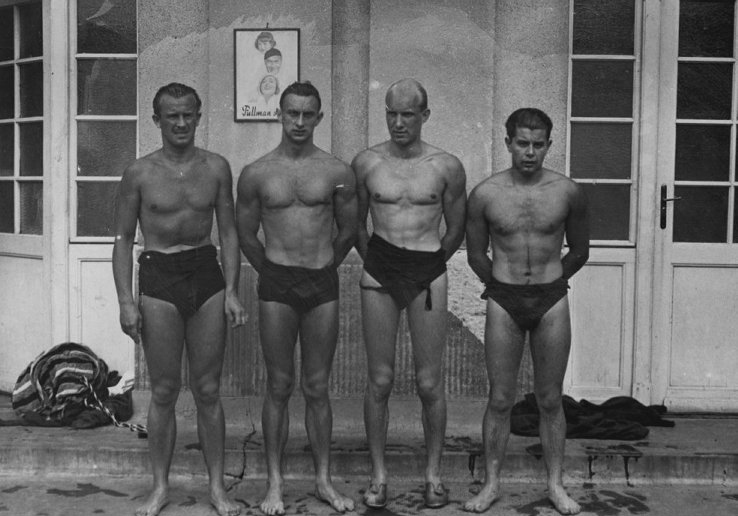
- László Szabados, Ferenc Csik, Lengyel, Ödön Grof

Personal information
- Born: September 4, 1915 Kaposvár, Austria-Hungary
- Died: April 30, 1993 (aged 77) Edgewater, New Jersey, United States

Sport
- Sport: Swimming
Medal record
Representing Hungary
Olympic Games
Bronze medal – third place	1936 Berlin	4×200 m freestyle
European Championships
Gold medal – first place	1934 Magdeburg	4×200 m freestyle
Bronze medal – third place	1938 London	100 m backstroke

Árpád Lengyel (4 September 1915 – 30 April 1993) was a Hungarian swimmer who competed in the 1936 Summer Olympics.

He was born in Kaposvár and died in Edgewater, New Jersey, United States.

In the 1936 Olympics he won a bronze medal in the 4 × 200 m freestyle relay event. He was also fourth in his first round heat of the 400 m freestyle event and fifth in his first round heat of the 100 m backstroke event and did not advance in both occasions.

== See also ==
- World record progression 4 × 100 metres freestyle relay
