= Arthur Lindegren =

American swimmer (1911–1981)

- Lindegren at age 24, circa March, 1935 while competing for Golden Gate Junior College

Personal information
- Full name: John Arthur Lindegren
- Nickname: "Art"
- National team: United States
- Born: October 13, 1911 Los Angeles, California, U.S.
- Died: May 23, 1981 (aged 69) Bremerton, Washington, U.S.
- Height: 5 ft 10 in (1.78 m)
- Weight: 167 lb (76 kg)
- Spouses: Eleanor Lewis (m. 1937); Leona E. Phebus (m. 1970)
- Children: 2 daughters

Sport
- Sport: Swimming
- Events: 50, 100, 200 freestyle 4x200 freestyle relay
- Strokes: Freestyle
- Club: San Pedro Swim Club; Los Angeles Athletic Club
- College team: Golden Gate Junior College
- Coach: Wallace Detrick (Long Beach Poly); George Madera (Golden Gate J.C.); Bob Kiphuth ('36 Olympics)

John Arthur "Art" Lindegren (October 13, 1911 – May 23, 1981) was an American competition swimmer who competed for Golden Gate Junior College and the Los Angeles Athletic Club and represented the United States in the men's 100-meter freestyle at the 1936 Berlin Olympics, where he placed seventh. After a move to Bremerton, Washington in 1962, he worked for the Washington State Ferry System as a Seaman through 1974.

== Early life and swimming ==
John Arthur Lindegren, known as Arthur, was born October 13, 1911 in Los Angeles, California to Arthur G. and Lisa Ann Castle Lindegren, growing up in nearby Long Beach. Arthur's father was an immigrant of Swedish descent and had worked in maintenance and supply for the Los Angeles Harbor Department, a career not unlike the one John Arthur would pursue in Washington state after his swimming career ended.

=== Long Beach Polytech High School ===
In his early career, Arthur swam for Long Beach Polytechnic High School in the Los Angeles suburb of Long Beach where he was coached by Wallace Detrick. A particularly strong program, in 1933 Coach Detrick's Polytech swim team was considered one of the strongest teams on the West Coast, winning the Pacific Coast and Southern California titles by large margins. While at Polytech, Lindegren was part of the All-American Interscholastic Swimming team and tied the High School world record for the 50-yard freestyle. Swimming as a High School Senior in 1932, Lindegren placed first in the 100-yard freestyle at the California Interscholastic Federation (CIF) Southern Section championship with a time of 54.7 seconds, gaining recognition as one of Southern California's outstanding young swimmers.

Lindegren was a charter member of the San Pedro Swim Club which received a charter from the Red Cross Life Saving Service in April, 1936.

Representing the Los Angeles Carters Swim Club at age 17, Lindegren was an entrant for the San Diego Suns Silver Gate Channel Swim to be held on June 23, 1929. The race was usually a 670-yard sprint in the San Diego Harbor area, and Florence Chambers was a frequent entrant.

=== Golden Gate Junior College ===
After graduating Long Beach Polytechnic, at 5 feet, 10 inches and 167 pounds Lindegren swam for and later graduated San Francisco's Golden Gate Junior College in the mid-1930's, under the training and supervision of Coach George Madera. Representing Golden Gate in March, 1935, Lindegren attempted to set a record in the 75-yard freestyle, having already come close to the 1913 record set by Duke Kahanamoku, and later tied the world mark with a time of 37.4 seconds. During his collegiate career, Lindegren held the Pacific Coast Intercollegiate record for the 100-yard distance at 51.4 seconds, as well as the 100 and 200-yard event Pacific Association records.

In the 1930's, San Francisco's Golden Gate College had one of the more outstanding college swim teams on the West coast. Fellow 1936 freestyle Olympian Ralph Gilman, and backstroker Bob Walker swam with Lindegren for Golden Gate. The team beat the strong varsity swim team from Stanford with a decisive 57-33 victory on February 2, 1935 with Lindegren swimming the anchor leg as part of the winning 4x100-yard freestyle relay event for Golden Gate that recorded a combined time of 3:49.9. It was the first defeat for the Stanford swimmers since 1919. Lindegren closed on the anchor swimmer for Stanford, and passed him in an exciting finish, recording a near record time of 52.1 seconds for the final leg. Lindegren also won the individual 100-meter event against Stanford with a time of :58.7 seconds. Golden Gate also defeated the strong team at the University of California 49-35 in competition between colleges with Lindegren competing for Golden Gates's winning 4x100 freestyle relay. In gaining regional swimming dominance, Golden Gates's swimmers set a number of Pacific Coast Intercollegiate records. Known as the Golden Gate Junior College "Wandering Raiders," they garnered considerable publicity for the school on San Francisco's Golden Gate Avenue. Affiliated with San Francisco's Central YMCA in the 1930's, the school had access to their swimming facilities.

In February 1935, Lindegren swam in a relay that covered around 4.1 miles with the Golden Gate Junior College relay team from San Francisco to Oakland Bay as part of the Bay Bridge Relay. The mayor of Oakland, William J. McCracken and Angelo Rossi of San Francisco were present as part of the event.

=== 1936 Olympic swimming trials ===
At the 1936 US Olympic Trials at the Rocky Point Pool in Providence, Rhode Island from July 10-12, Lindegren finished third in the 100-meter freestyle, qualifying him for the U.S. team. He had technically qualified for the 100-meter freestyle sprint and the 4x200 meter free relay. Arthur Highland of Northwestern placed first with a 58.8, two seconds over the world record, and Peter Fick of Philadelphia, who had formerly set the world record, was second. After qualifying for the U.S. team, Lindegren trained in New Haven, Connecticut with Robert J. H. Kiphuth, the 1936 Olympic Coach. By the time of the trials and earlier, he represented the Los Angeles Athletic Club.

== 1936 Berlin Olympics ==
Managed by U.S. Olympic Coach Robert J. H. Kiphuth of Yale University, Lindegren made the finals and finished seventh in the men's 100-meter freestyle at the 1936 Berlin Olympics with a time of 59.9 seconds in the event final. Ferenc Csik of Hungary took the gold medal with a time of 57.6, Masanori Yusa of Japan took the silver with a time of 57.9, and Shigeo Arai of Japan took the bronze with a time of 58.0. The Japanese team were a strong pre-game favorite to win the event. After the Olympics, Lindegren toured Denmark and Poland.

In December, 1936, after returning from the Olympics, Lindegren provided a swimming exhibition for several months as part of a Vaudeville performance that opened on December 1 at Madison Square Gardens in New York.

=== Careers ===
In 1937 in San Pedro, Lindegren worked for the General Petroleum Company. From 1963-1974, Lindegren worked for the Washington State Ferry System as a Seaman, retiring from the position in 1974.

=== Marriages ===
On September 20, 1937, Lindegren married swimmer Eleanor Lewis of Los Angeles in Los Vegas, Nevada. Ms. Lewis graduated the Marlborough School, a private girls college preparatory school in Los Angeles.

In 1962, Lindegren moved to the greater Bremerton, Washington area from Long Beach, California. On June 8, 1970, he married Leona E. Phebus in Bremerton.

He died at the age of 69 on May 23, 1981 at Harrison Memorial Hospital in Bremerton, Washington. He was survived by his wife Leona Phebus, daughters Elaine and Barbara of Portland, Washington and two grandchildren. He had been a member of the Bremerton Elks and the First United Church of Bremerton.
