= Charlie Chan (disambiguation) =

Charlie Chan is a fictional detective created by author Earl Derr Biggers.

Charlie Chan may also refer to:

- Charlie Chan (composer), Australian pianist and composer
- Charlie Chan (swimmer), Chinese swimmer
- Ryan Sakoda, Japanese professional wrestler who wrestled under the name Charlie Chan
- Charlie Chan Is Dead: An Anthology of Contemporary Asian American Fiction, a 1993 anthology of Asian American literature edited by Jessica Hagedorn

== See also ==
- Charles Chan (disambiguation)
