= Walter Spence =

Canadian and Guyanan swimmer

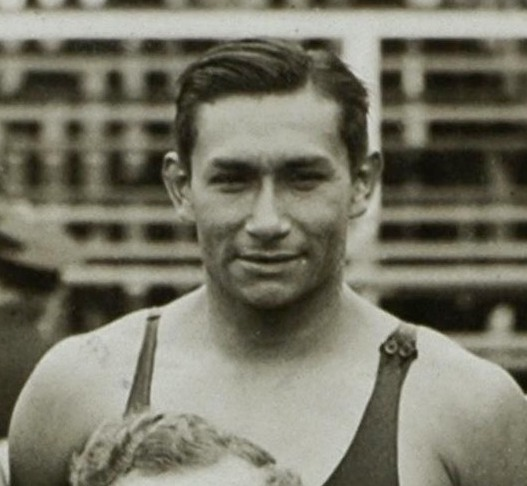

Personal information
- Full name: Walter Percy Spence
- National team: Canada; British Guiana
- Born: March 3, 1901 Christianburg, British Guiana
- Died: October 16, 1958 (aged 57) White Plains, New York, U.S.
- Height: 1.95 m (6 ft 5 in)
- Weight: 83 kg (183 lb)

Sport
- Sport: Swimming
- Strokes: Breaststroke, freestyle
- Club: Brooklyn Central YMCA (U.S.); Penn Athletic Club (U.S.); New York Athletic Club (U.S.)
- College team: Rutgers University (U.S.)
Medal record
Olympic Games
Representing Canada
| Bronze medal – third place | 1928 Amsterdam | 4x200 m freestyle |
British Empire Games
Representing British Guiana
| Silver medal – second place | 1938 Sydney | 220 yd breaststroke |

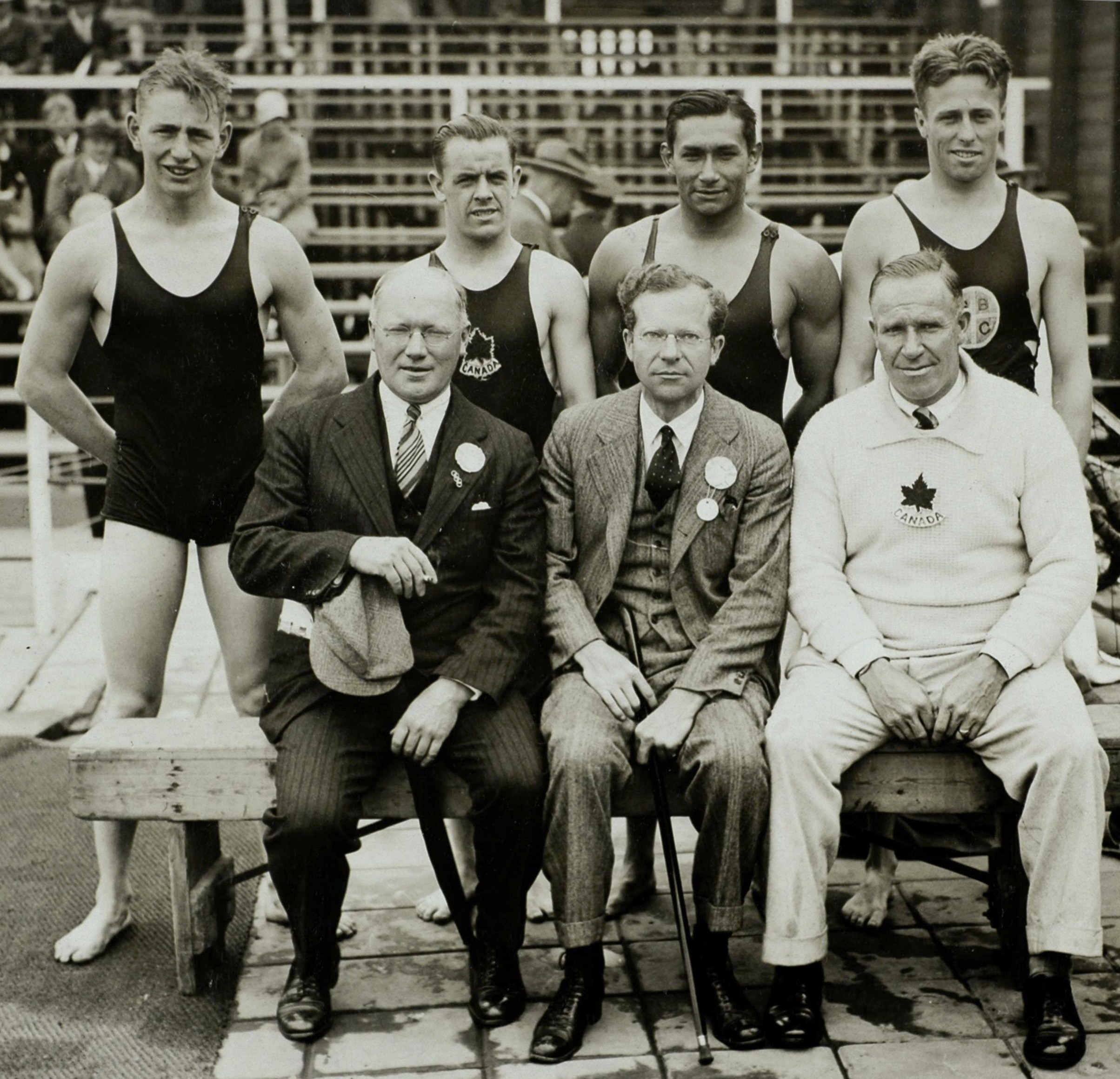
Canadian 4×200-metre team at 1928 Olympics; Spence is second from right

Walter Percy Spence (March 3, 1901 – October 16, 1958) was a swimmer from British Guiana (present-day Guyana) who competed for Canada in the 1928 Summer Olympics and 1932 Summer Olympics. He immigrated to the United States and held several national swimming titles there.

Spence was born in Christianburg, British Guiana, the oldest of eight children—four brothers and four sisters. His father was Scottish and worked as a big game hunter and guide, while his mother was Indian. The Spences would swim in the Demerara River; six family members bore scars from piranha bites suffered while swimming there. Walter and two of his younger brothers, Wallace and Leonard, became champion swimmers. Two of the four Spence sisters also swam competitively, although not at the level of their brothers. The youngest Spence brother, Harold, showed great promise but was killed in action in World War II before his swimming career could take off.

After becoming the top swimmer in British Guiana, Walter Spence moved to Trinidad and began competing there. After losing a freestyle race to a swimmer from Chicago, his first-ever loss in that type of competition, Spence decided to pursue training in the United States. He arrived in the United States in 1923, and would eventually gain U.S. citizenship. He began his U.S. career with the Brooklyn YMCA team, swimming the breaststroke and three-stroke individual medley. By 1925 he had broken ten world records and was the top point scorer at the Amateur Athletic Union (AAU) national championships that year. He later competed with the Penn Athletic Club in Philadelphia, Pennsylvania.

He competed for Canada in the 1928 Olympics and won a bronze medal in the 4x200-metre freestyle relay event. He was also sixth in the 100-metre freestyle event and sixth in the 200-metre breaststroke event. Four years later he was fourth in the 4x200-metre freestyle relay event. He was also fourth in his semifinal of the 100-metre freestyle event and fourth in his semifinal of the 200-metre breaststroke event and did not advance in both occasions. He later represented British Guiana at the 1938 British Empire Games. He won the silver medal in the 220-yard breaststroke contest and finished fourth in the 110-yard freestyle competition.

In 1930, Spence enrolled as a freshman at Rutgers University. He set the collegiate record in the 100 yard freestyle and earned the highest point score at the 1934 National Collegiate Athletic Association (NCAA) championships. In 1934 he also broke the world record in the 300-yard three-stroke individual medley. He graduated with a bachelor's degree in journalism on June 9, 1934.

After leaving Rutgers, Spence swam with the New York Athletic Club (NYAC). His two younger brothers, Wallace and Leonard, joined him in the United States in 1926 and 1928, respectively. The brothers competed for the NYAC in the three-stroke medley relay, with Wallace swimming the backstroke, Leonard the breaststroke, and Walter the front crawl. Together, they won the 1933 AAU championship title in the event and later set the world record during an exhibition at Rutgers. Joining with Peter Fick, they won the four-man 400 yard freestyle relay at the 1935 AAU championships.

After retiring from swimming, Spence worked as an insurance salesman for the Security Mutual Life Insurance Company in New York City. He married Sheila O'Connor and had five children: David (born c. 1942), Harold (born c. 1947), Donald (born c. 1950), Sheila (born c. 1952), and Wendy (born c. 1953).

Spence was killed in an accident on October 16, 1958, in White Plains, New York, while trying to board a train at the North White Plains station. He was on his way from New York City to his home in Hawthorne and had stepped off the train to call his wife during a stop at White Plains. When the train began to debark, he ran to catch it and attempted to re-board, but slipped and fell onto the tracks. He suffered severe injuries to his legs and died at White Plains Hospital an hour and a half later.

Nine years after his death, in 1967, Walter, Wallace, and Leonard Spence were inducted together into the International Swimming Hall of Fame.

== See also ==
- List of members of the International Swimming Hall of Fame
- List of Commonwealth Games medallists in swimming (men)
- List of Olympic medalists in swimming (men)
