= Hastert (surname) =

Hastert is a surname. Notable people with the surname include:

- Dennis Hastert (1942–2026), American politician, 51st Speaker of the United States House of Representatives
- John Hastert (born 1958), American politician, Democratic member of the Wyoming Senate
- Pierre Hastert (1912–1972), Luxembourgish swimmer at the 1936 Summer Olympics
