= Arthur Highland =

American swimmer (1911–1995)

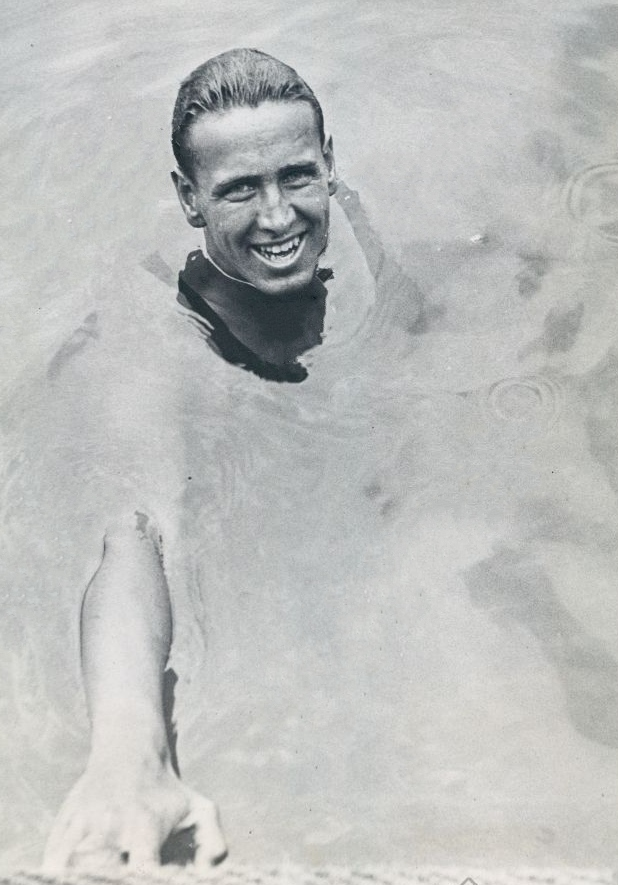
- Highland in 1934

Personal information
- Full name: Arthur Raymond Highland
- Nickname: "Art"
- National team: United States
- Born: December 17, 1911 Aurora, Illinois, U.S.
- Died: March 17, 1995 (aged 83) San Diego, California, U.S.
- Spouse: Marion Brailsford

Sport
- Sport: Swimming
- Strokes: Freestyle
- Club: Lake Shore Athletic Club
- College team: Northwestern University
- Coach: Tom Robinson (Northwestern)

Arthur Raymond Highland (December 17, 1911 – March 17, 1995) was an American competition swimmer for Northwestern University, who represented the United States in the 1936 Summer Olympics in Berlin, Germany.

== Early life ==
Born on December 17, 1911, in Aurora, Illinois to Andrew and Anna C. Highland, he attended Carl Schurz High School and swam for Chicago's Lake Shore Athletic Club. On January 12, 1930, as an 18-year-old High School student, Highland set a new national interscholastic record in the 100-yard freestyle of 54.2 seconds. Ascending the ranks of competitive freestylers while swimming for the Chicago Athletic Association, Highland placed third at the Central AAU Championships in the 100-yard freestyle in July, 1930.

== Northwestern University ==
From 1932-1934, Highland swam for Northwestern University Varsity swim team under Hall of Fame Coach Tom Robinson. A Liberal Arts major, he took varsity letters in three years, and in the 1933-1934 season served as captain of the men's swimming team. He was a Big Ten Champion three times, and a national champion twice. In his College sophomore year in 1932, he won the Big Ten Championship and then the national championship on the 400-yard freestyle relay team.

At the NCAA Championships in 1932, he was on Northwestern's winning 400-yard freestyle relay team that set a time of 3:36.6, swimming with Paul Troup, Volney Wilson, and Merton Wilcox.

Swimming anchor in the 300-yard medley relay for Northwestern University, he helped set a new national intercollegiate record of 3:05.8 with team members Bernard Hahn and Donald Horn at the National Collegiate Association Championships in New Haven, Connecticut on March 25, 1933. Highland clinched the win and helped Northwestern take the team title by passing the second-place swimmer from Yale in the last few yards.

Highland captured the 1934 AAU championship in the 100 freestyle.

== 1936 Berlin Olympics ==
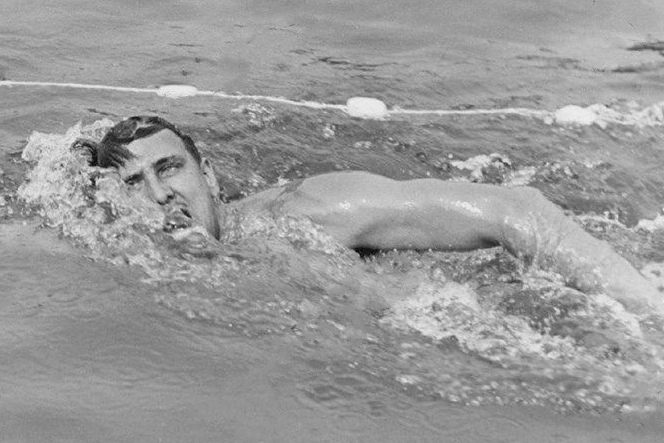
Highland at the 1936 Trials

In an unexpected triumph in the July, 1936 Olympic Trials in Warwick, Rhode Island, Highland won the 100-meter freestyle trial final, beating out the national champion Peter Fick, and Arthur Lindegren, who took third.

Highland competed in the semifinals of the 100-meter freestyle, and recorded the eighth-best overall time of 59.4 seconds. In the fast paced, highly competitive world of international competition at the Olympics, Highland's time was 1.8 seconds behind the bronze medalist.

In 1937, he married Marion Brailsford, another graduate of Northwestern.

=== Honors ===
In 1998 he was inducted into the Northwestern University Hall of Fame for his swimming achievements.

Highland died on March 17, 1995 in San Diego, California at the age of 83, and was buried at the Saint Bartholomew Episcopal Church Columbarium.

== See also ==
- List of Northwestern University alumni
