= Romund Gabrielsen =

British swimmer

Personal information
- Born: 22 July 1917 Romford, England
- Died: 6 February 1971 (aged 53)

Sport
- Sport: Swimming

Romund Gabrielsen (22 July 1917 – 6 February 1971) was a British swimmer. He competed the men's 100 metre freestyle and men's 4 × 200 metre freestyle relay events at the 1936 Summer Olympics.
