= Charles Chan =

Charles Chan may refer to:

- Charles Chan (Jackie Chan's father) (1914–2008), father of actor/director Jackie Chan

== See also ==
- Charlie Chan (disambiguation)
