= Tone Gazzari =

Yugoslav swimmer

Personal information
- Born: 25 February 1912 Split, Austria-Hungary
- Died: 23 July 1996 (aged 84)

Sport
- Sport: Swimming

Tone Gazzari (25 February 1912 – 23 July 1996) was a Yugoslav swimmer. He competed in the men's 4 × 200 metre freestyle relay at the 1936 Summer Olympics.
