= Hilltop House =

American radio soap opera (1937–1957)

- Other names: The Story of Bess Johnson
- Genre: Soap opera
- Country of origin: United States
- Language: English
- Syndicates: CBS; Mutual; NBC
- Starring: Bess Johnson; Grace Matthews; Jan Miner; Vera Allen
- Announcer: Frank Gallop
- Written by: Addy Richton and Lynn Stone (writing jointly as Adelaide Marston)
- Directed by: Carlo De Angelo; Jack Rubin
- Produced by: Edwin Wolfe
- Original release: November 1, 1937 – July 30, 1957
- Opening theme: Brahms Lullaby
- Ending theme: Brahms Lullaby

Hilltop House is an American old-time radio soap opera. It debuted on November 1, 1937, was replaced by a spinoff, then was re-launched twice, with its final episode coming on July 30, 1957.

== Versions ==
Hilltop House is dedicated to the women of America ... the story of a woman who must choose between love and the career of raising other women's children. — Epigraph of program.

Radio historian Jim Cox wrote in his book, The Great Radio Soap Operas, "Listeners — most of them mothers themselves — related to the tenderness with which this tireless servant went about her tasks." A review of the program's premiere episode included the comment, "Both the script and the writing stood out as well above the average serial."

=== Hilltop House (1937 - 1941) ===
Hilltop House's stories centered on Bess Johnson and the struggles that she faced as the person in charge of Hilltop House Orphanage. Children were integral to the plots, and the stories usually dealt with the youngsters' interactions with adults. Financial problems and conflicts between the staff and members of the orphanage's board of directors also arose frequently. Sponsored by Palmolive soap, this version was broadcast on both CBS and Mutual beginning on November 1, 1937. It left Mutual in 1938 but remained on CBS until March 28, 1941.

=== The Story of Bess Johnson (1941 - 1942) ===
In 1941, Hilltop House was replaced by a spinoff, The Story of Bess Johnson. The on-air premise for the change was that bigoted officials had dismissed Johnson from her position at the orphanage, and the new program would focus on Johnson as she looked for a new job and faced new dramatic developments. The story behind the scenes was that the sponsor, Palmolive soap, changed advertising firms, and the new agency decided to reduce production costs by reducing the quality of the program. That led producer Edwin Wolfe to take Hilltop House off the air, whereupon the new advertising agency replaced it with The Story of Bess Johnson. Johnson left Hilltop House on a Friday, and on the following Monday she became superintendent of Mount Holly School for Girls. Kleenex tissues was the sponsor. When it debuted on March 31, 1941, the spinoff was broadcast on both NBC and CBS. At some point, it left CBS, and it ended on NBC on September 25, 1942.

In 1941, Eleanor Roosevelt participated in an episode of The Story of Bess Johnson. The plot had Roosevelt visiting Mount Holly School to "talk about many of the complexities now confronting the young women of America."

=== Hilltop House (1948 - 1955) ===
On May 17, 1948, Miles Laboratories brought Hilltop House back to CBS. The orphanage was now headed by superintendent Grace Dolben, with Julie Erickson as her assistant. The program ran for seven years, with Pharmaco, Inc., replacing Miles as sponsor for the last year. It ended on July 1, 1955.

=== Hilltop House (1956 - 1957) ===
After about a year's absence, Hilltop House returned for one more run on radio, debuting on September 3, 1956, on NBC. This time it faced competition from growing audiences for television, compounded by the shift of local radio stations away from soap operas. The show left the air on July 30, 1957.

== Personnel ==
The table below shows characters in the three versions of Hilltop House and its spinoff, The Story of Bess Johnson.

Character	Actor
Bess Johnson	Bess Johnson
Julie Erickson	Grace Matthews; Jan Miner
Grace Dolben	Vera Allen
Dr. Robby Clark	Carleton Young
Paul Hutchinson	Alfred Swenson; Jack Roseleigh
Thelma Gidley	Irene Hubbard
Jerry Adair	Jimmy Donnelly
Jean Adair	Janice Gilbert
David Barton	John Moore
Captain John Barry	David Gothard
Dr. Jeff Browning	Robert Haag
Reed Nixon	Phil Sterling
Terry Wallace	Janet (Janie) Alexander
Philip Wallace	Casey Allen
Betty Taylor	Alice Yourman
Henry Taylor	Carl Frank
Marion Wallace	Ruth Yorke
Aunt Marie	Kate McComb
Judge Lennox	Bill Adams
Frank Klobber	Jay Jostyn
Roy Barry	Jerry Tucker
Steve Courtland	Joe Curtin
Mrs. Wendell	Lucille Wall
Miss Ludlow	Gladys Thornton
Ralph Wendell	Larry Newton
Neal	Dick Wigginton

Frank Gallop was the announcer. The producer was Edwin Wolfe, while the directors were Carlo De Angelo and Jack Rubin. Addy Richton and Lynn Stone (writing jointly as Adelaide Marston) wrote the scripts. Chester Kingsbury provided the music.
