= Georges Tandel =

Luxembourgish swimmer

Personal information
- Born: 24 July 1910 Luxembourg, Luxembourg
- Died: 17 December 1981 (aged 71) Luxembourg, Luxembourg

Sport
- Sport: Swimming

Georges Tandel (24 July 1910 – 17 December 1981) was a Luxembourgish swimmer. He competed in the men's 4 × 200 metre freestyle relay at the 1936 Summer Olympics.
