= Herbert Hnatek =

Austrian swimmer

Personal information
- Born: 21 July 1916
- Died: May 1983

Sport
- Sport: Swimming

Herbert Hnatek (21 July 1916 – May 1983) was an Austrian freestyle swimmer. He competed in the men's 4 × 200 metre freestyle relay at the 1936 Summer Olympics.
