= Heiko Schwartz =

German water polo player

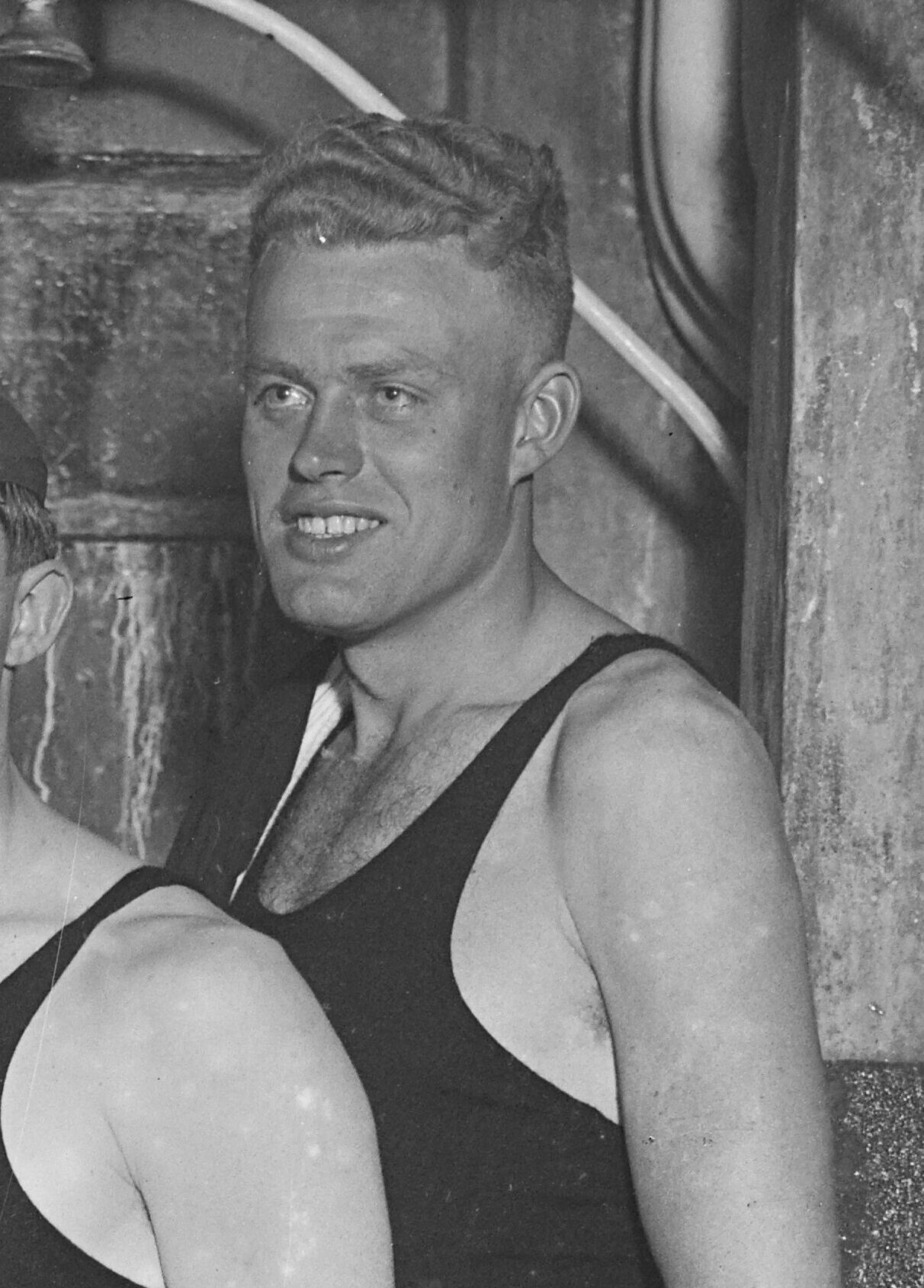
- Heiko Schwartz in 1933

Personal information
- Born: September 21, 1911 Norden, German Empire
- Died: October 29, 1973 (aged 62) Bielefeld, West Germany

Sport
- Sport: Swimming
Medal record
Representing Germany
Men's Water Polo
Summer Olympics
Silver medal – second place	1932 Los Angeles	Team competition
Men's Swimming
European Championships
Silver medal – second place	1934 Magdeburg	4×200 m freestyle

Heiko Schwartz (21 September 1911 – 29 October 1973) was a German water polo player and freestyle swimmer who competed in the 1932 Summer Olympics and in the 1936 Summer Olympics.

He was born in Norden.

In 1932, he was part of the German team which won the silver medal. He played all four matches and scored four goals.

Four years later, he was eliminated in the first round of the 100 metre freestyle competition.

== See also ==
- List of Olympic medalists in water polo (men)
