= Joachim Karliczek =

Polish swimmer

Personal information
- Born: 31 October 1914 Katowice, Poland
- Died: 17 April 1993 (aged 78) Ober-Ramstadt, Germany

Sport
- Sport: Swimming

Joachim Karliczek (31 October 1914 – 17 April 1993) was a Polish swimmer. He competed in the men's 4 × 200 metre freestyle relay at the 1936 Summer Olympics.
