= Bess Johnson =

American actress

Bess Johnson ( circa 1902 - January 3, 1975) was an American actress best known for her work on old-time radio. During her time on the air, "she was the highest paid daytime radio artist."

== Early years ==
Johnson was born in Keyser, West Virginia, the daughter of Mr. and Mrs. Herman J. Johnson. She grew up in Elkins, West Virginia, with theatrical family roots: her father owned two theaters in addition to publishing a newspaper and being a state senator, while her mother was actress Ann Barnes.

Johnson graduated from Davis & Elkins College. Her plans for a career as a singer ended when she lost her voice and learned after a tonsillectomy that she would not be able to sing again. Turning to drama as an alternative, she studied at Carnegie Tech in Pittsburgh and the American Academy of Dramatic Arts (AADA) in New York. Johnson's income from jobs as an artists' model and a restaurant worker paid her way as a student at the AADA.

== Career ==
Beginning in 1923, Johnson worked in stock theater with the Goodman Players in Chicago for five years. After appearing on KDKA in Pittsburgh as an amateur, she first appeared professionally on radio in Chicago when she filled in for another actress at the last minute on WMAQ. Johnson was "radio's voice of Lady Esther" for six years.

Beginning in 1932, Johnson worked for the Stack-Goble agency in Chicago as assistant director for radio before being promoted to head the department. Her roles in radio programs included those shown in the table below.

Program	Character
Hilltop House	Bess Johnson
Life Begins	Martha Webster
The Story of Bess Johnson	Bess Johnson
The Story of Mary Marlin	Frances Matthews
Today's Children	Fran

For six months Johnson hosted The Bess Johnson Club, a DuMont Television Network program that focused on fashion. She spent her summers performing in repertory theater in Ogunquit, Maine, and during winters she participated in a theatrical group that presented plays for hospitalized veterans.

== Personal life ==
Johnson was married to Dr. Solomon P. Perry, who had been her childhood sweetheart. They had a daughter, Jane, and divorced on November 21, 1936. On June 10, 1941, Johnson married Olympic swimmer Peter Fick In Warrenton, Virginia.

== Death ==
On January 3, 1975, Johnson died at age 73.
