= Masanori Yusa =

Japanese swimmer (1915–1975)

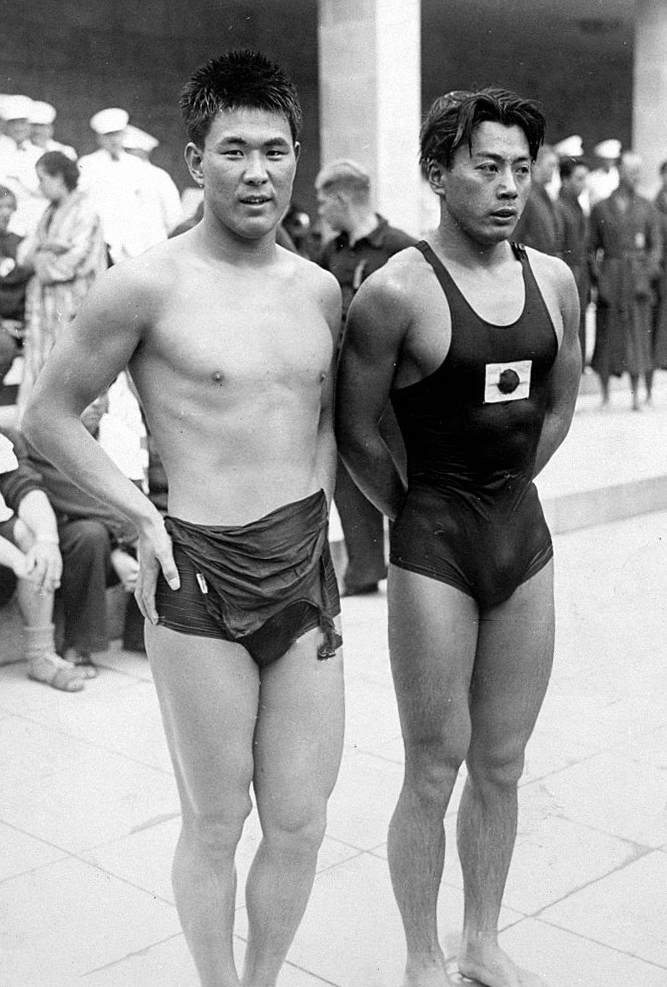
- Shigeo Arai and Masanori Yusa (right) at the 1936 Olympics

Personal information
- Born: January 8, 1915 Tadotsu, Kagawa Prefecture, Japan
- Died: March 8, 1975 (aged 60) Tokyo, Japan
- Education: Nihon University

Sport
- Sport: Swimming
Medal record
Representing Japan
Olympics
| Gold medal – first place | 1932 Los Angeles | 4×200 m freestyle |
| Gold medal – first place | 1936 Berlin | 4×200 m freestyle |
| Silver medal – second place | 1936 Berlin | 100 m freestyle |

Masanori Yusa (遊佐 正憲, Yusa Masanori; January 8, 1915 – March 8, 1975) was a Japanese freestyle swimmer. He won gold medals in the 4 × 200 m relay in the 1932 and 1936 Olympics, setting world records on both occasions. In 1936 he finished almost simultaneously with Shigeo Arai and Masaharu Taguchi in the 100 m race and was awarded a silver medal.

Yusa graduated from Nihon University and later worked for the Yokohama Rubber Company. In 1942, he married Yumeko Aizome, a famous stage and silent/sound film actress in Japan.

== See also ==
- List of members of the International Swimming Hall of Fame
