= Arturo Álvarez (swimmer) =

Peruvian swimmer

Personal information
- Born: 29 December 1919 Lima, Peru
- Died: 2015 (aged 95–96)

Sport
- Sport: Swimming

Arturo Álvarez (29 December 1919 – 2015) was a Peruvian swimmer. He competed in the men's 100 metre freestyle at the 1936 Summer Olympics.
