= Claude Desusclade =

French swimmer

Personal information
- Nationality: French
- Born: 19 May 1919
- Died: 15 April 2015 (aged 95)

Sport
- Sport: Swimming

Claude Desusclade (19 May 1919 – 15 April 2015) was a French swimmer. He competed in the men's 100 metre freestyle at the 1936 Summer Olympics.
