= Paul Wolf =

American swimmer (1915–1972)

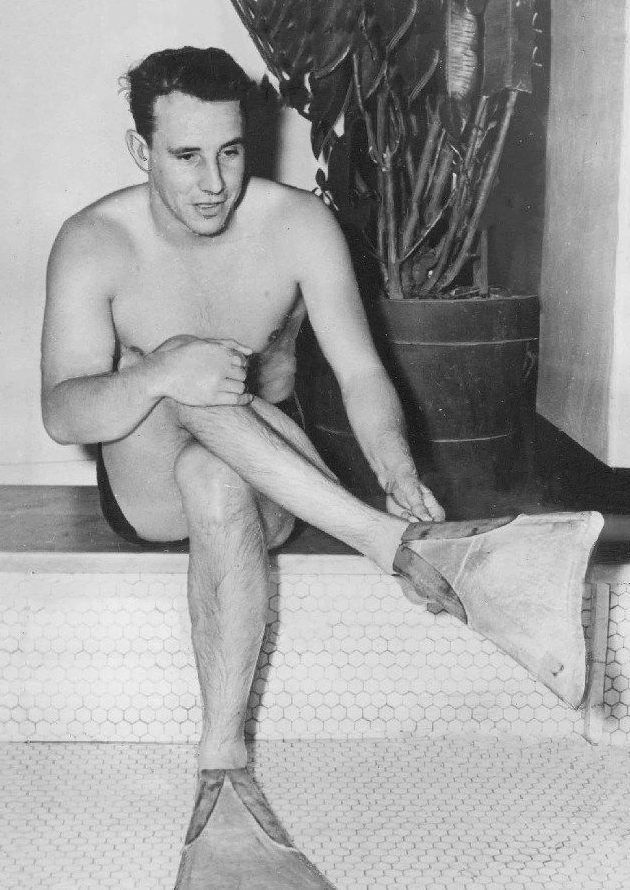
- Wolf in 1940

Personal information
- Full name: Paul G. Wolf
- National team: United States
- Born: October 5, 1915 Madison, Indiana, U.S.
- Died: August 14, 1972 (aged 56) Pasadena, California, U.S.

Sport
- Sport: Swimming
- Strokes: Freestyle
- Club: Los Angeles Athletic Club
- College team: University of Southern California
Medal record
Representing the United States
Olympic Games
Silver medal – second place	1936 Berlin	4×200 m freestyle

Paul G. Wolf (October 5, 1915 – October 14, 1972) was an American competition swimmer for the University of Southern California, and a 1936 Berlin Olympic silver medalist in the 4x200 freestyle relay. Wolf graduated from USC in June, 1940, served in the U.S. Navy, and would later work as a swim coach.

== Early life and swimming ==
Born in Madison, Indiana, Wolf attended Venice High School and began swimming in coastal swimming competitions as early as 1928 around the age of 13. As he matured, he competed and trained primarily as a member of the Los Angeles Athletic Club. On May 18, 1933, while representing Venice High at the Western League Swimming Championships, Wolf won the 100-yard swim, and shattered the 220-yard event with a record time of 2:32.8, leading his high school to the team championship for the second consecutive year. In August, 1933, he set a new record for the 1.5 mile ocean swim in La Jolla with a time of 40:46.8.

In August 1935, he competed in Japan with an American team of 14 swimmers in international competition against the dominant Japanese national team. The American delegation was coached by Bob Kiphuth, who would also coach the 1936 Men's Olympic swimming team in Berlin. Swimming in Los Angeles for the Los Angeles Swim Club at the Western AAU Championship in September, 1935, in heats that would help qualify him for the 1936 Olympic team, Wolf set a Far Western AAU Conference record in the 100-meter freestyle of 59.4 seconds defeating Art Lindegren. He also swam a

== 1936 Olympics ==
Wolf won a silver medal as a member of the second-place U.S. team in the 4×200-meter freestyle relay, together with teammates Ralph Flanagan, John Macionis and Jack Medica at the 1936 Olympics in Berlin. The American team had a combined time of 9:03.0, and placed second to the gold medal-winning Japanese team. The American and Japanese teams were the overriding favorites to compete for the gold medal, and after taking the lead, the Japanese team won by a margin of around 12 seconds. Bill Kiphuth, who would later coach at Yale, was the head coach for the Men's 1936 Olympic swimming team.

In 1938, Wolf returned to Berlin and swam with the U.S. team that recorded a new World Record in the 800-meter freestyle relay. In July, 1938, swimming for the University of Southern California, Wolf placed third in the 100-meter at the AAU National Championship in Louisville, Kentucky.

== University of Southern California ==
As a collegiate swimmer at USC, Wolf served as team captain and was co-national champion in the 100-yard freestyle at the 1939 NCAA championships. His time of 52.9 at the 1939 NCAA Championships tied with Charles Barker, who swam for the winning college team, the University of Michigan. At the National AAU Championships in Ann Arbor Michigan in March, 1939, Wolf placed second in the 50-yard freestyle and would hold the world record time in the event of 25.4.

== Later life ==
After graduating from USC in June 1940, Wolf worked as a lifeguard at Hermosa Beach and then enlisted in the U.S. Navy in Los Angeles as a Chief Boatswain's Mate and became part of their physical education program, under the direction of Lieutenant Commander James J. (Gene) Tunney. He reported to the Naval training station in Norfolk, Virginia.

In later life, Wolf taught at the Los Angeles Athletic Club and was owner and operator of Pasadena California's Paul Wolf Olympic Swim Club in the 1960s at least through 1967.

== See also ==
- List of Olympic medalists in swimming (men)
- List of University of Southern California people
- World record progression 4 × 100 metres freestyle relay
