= Roger Zirilli =

Swiss swimmer (1910–1955)

Personal information
- Nationality: Swiss
- Born: 31 December 1910
- Died: 2 June 1955 (aged 44) Versoix, Switzerland

Sport
- Sport: Swimming

Roger Zirilli (31 December 1910 – 2 June 1955) was a Swiss swimmer. He competed in the men's 100 metre freestyle and the water polo at the 1936 Summer Olympics.
