= Sten-Olof Bolldén =

Swedish swimmer

Personal information
- Full name: Sten-Olof Anders Bolldén
- Nationality: Swedish
- Born: 16 June 1914 Stockholm, Sweden
- Died: 27 August 1940 (aged 26) Traryd, Sweden

Sport
- Sport: Swimming
- Club: Stockholms KK

Sten-Olof Anders Bolldén (16 June 1914 – 27 August 1940) was a Swedish swimmer. He competed in the men's 4 × 200 metre freestyle relay at the 1936 Summer Olympics.

Bolldén represented Stockholms KK.

Bolldén died on 27 August 1940 after the plane he was riding on crashed near Traryd.
