= William Kendall (swimmer) =

Australian swimmer

Personal information
- Nationality: Australian
- Born: 11 June 1916 Newcastle, New South Wales, Australia
- Died: 27 August 2004 (aged 88) Australia

Sport
- Sport: Swimming

William Kendall (11 June 1916 – 27 August 2004) was an Australian swimmer. He competed in the men's 100 metre freestyle at the 1936 Summer Olympics, reaching the semi-finals but not the finals. During his semi-final Olympic swim, Kendall became the first Australian to break the one-minute barrier in his event with a time of 59.9 seconds, leaving him in 5th place in the semi-final and with a final placing in the event of 9th out of 45.

Kendall had been the Australian 100-yards champion in 1935, and was willing to finance his own trip to the 1936 Games were he not selected for the Olympic team. He competed for Harvard University.
