= Helmut Barysz =

Polish swimmer

Personal information
- Born: 31 August 1916
- Died: c. January 1945

Sport
- Sport: Swimming

Helmut Barysz (31 August 1916 – c. January 1945) was a Polish swimmer. He competed in the men's 4 × 200 metre freestyle relay at the 1936 Summer Olympics. He went missing in action during World War II, and was declared dead in 1952.
