= Marian Gilman =

American swimmer (1914–1996)

Personal information
- Full name: Marian Ulmer Gilman
- National team: United States
- Born: July 2, 1914 Berkeley, California, U.S.
- Died: June 23, 1996 (aged 81) Yuba City, California, U.S.

Sport
- Sport: Swimming
- Strokes: Backstroke
- Club: Neptune Beach Swim Club

Marian Ulmer Gilman (July 2, 1914 – June 23, 1996), also known by her married name Marian Sharpe, was an American competition swimmer who represented the United States at the 1928 Summer Olympics in Amsterdam. As a 14-year-old, Gilman placed fourth in the event final of the women's 100-meter backstroke with a time of 1:24.2.

Her brother, Ralph Gilman, swam for the United States in the 1936 Summer Olympics.
