= Angelos Vlakhos =

Greek swimmer (born 1915)

Personal information
- Nationality: Greek
- Born: 1915

Sport
- Sport: Swimming

Angelos Vlakhos (born 1915, date of death unknown) was a Greek swimmer. He competed in the men's 4 × 200 metre freestyle relay at the 1936 Summer Olympics.
