= Shigeo Arai =

Japanese swimmer (1916–1944)

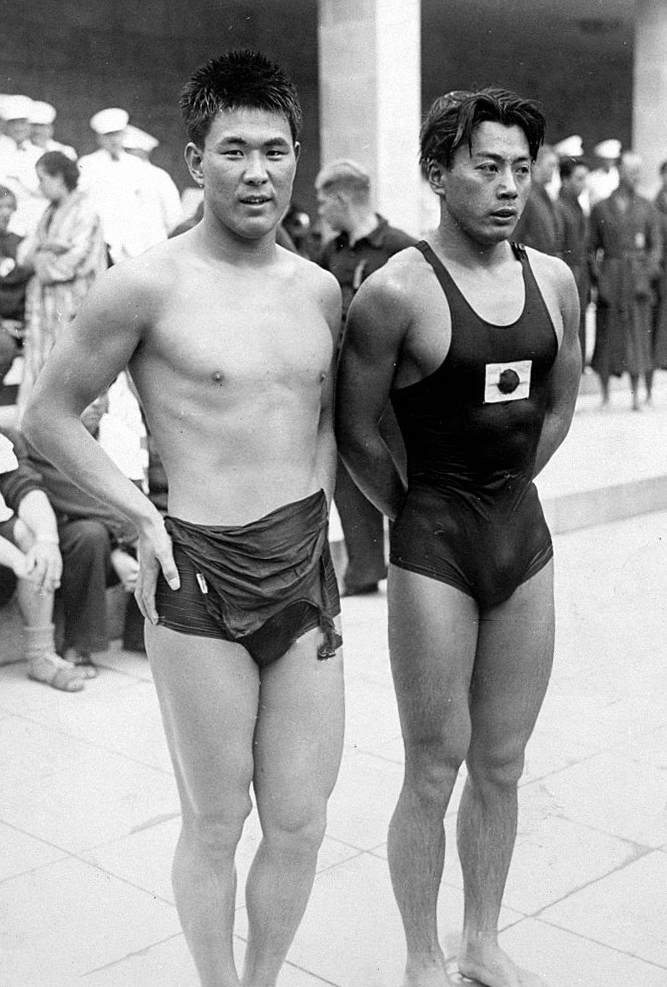
- Shigeo Arai (left) and Masanori Yusa at the 1936 Olympics

Personal information
- Native name: 新井 茂雄
- Born: August 8, 1916 Shizuoka Prefecture, Japan
- Died: July 19, 1944 (aged 27) Burma

Sport
- Sport: Swimming (freestyle)
Medal record
Representing Japan
Olympics
| Gold medal – first place | 1936 Berlin | 4×200 m freestyle relay |
| Bronze medal – third place | 1936 Berlin | 100 m freestyle |

Shigeo Arai (新井 茂雄, Arai Shigeo; August 8, 1916 – July 19, 1944) was a Japanese freestyle swimmer who competed at the 1936 Olympics. He won a gold medal in 4 × 200 m freestyle relay, setting a world record. In the individual 100 m race, he finished almost simultaneously with Masanori Yusa and Masaharu Taguchi and was awarded a bronze medal. Those Games were the only international competition for Arai, though he won three national titles in the 100 m and four in the 200 m freestyle between 1937 and 1940.

While serving in the Imperial Japanese Army during World War II, he was killed in action in Burma.

== See also ==
- List of members of the International Swimming Hall of Fame
