= Norbert Franck =

Luxembourgish swimmer

Personal information
- Born: 28 May 1918 Esch-sur-Alzette, Luxembourg
- Died: 4 October 2006 (aged 88) Luxembourg, Luxembourg

Sport
- Sport: Swimming

Norbert Franck (28 May 1918 – 4 October 2006) was a Luxembourgish swimmer. He competed in the men's 4 × 200 metre freestyle relay at the 1936 Summer Olympics.
