= Bertus Mooi Wilten =

Dutch swimmer

Personal information
- Full name: Sjoerd Lambertus Mooi Wilten
- Nickname: Bert Mooi
- Born: 30 November 1913 Semarang, Dutch East Indies
- Died: 27 June 1965 (aged 51) Eindhoven, Netherlands

Sport
- Sport: Swimming

Sjoerd Lambertus "Bertus" Mooi Wilten (30 November 1913 – 27 June 1965) was a Dutch swimmer. He joined the swimming club HPC in Heemstede. In 1934–35 he broke the Dutch national record on the 100 m freestyle twice for the long course and four times for the short course, reaching 1:00.6 in February 1935. He competed in the men's 100 metre freestyle at the 1936 Summer Olympics, but was eliminated in the second heat.
