= Piet Stam =

Dutch swimmer

Personal information
- Born: 20 February 1919 Pamekasan, Dutch East Indies
- Died: 5 July 1996 (aged 77) San Diego, California, United States

Sport
- Sport: Swimming

Piet Stam (20 February 1919 – 5 July 1996) was a Dutch freestyle swimmer. He competed in two events at the 1936 Summer Olympics.
