= Leonard Spence =

Bermudan swimmer

Personal information
- Born: Hubert Leonard Spence; May 23, 1909 Christianburg, British Guiana
- Died: November 10, 1947 (aged 38) Mount Pleasant, New York, U.S.

Sport
- Sport: Swimming

Hubert Leonard Spence (May 23, 1909 – November 10, 1947) was a swimmer from British Guiana (present-day Guyana) who competed for Bermuda in the 1936 Summer Olympics. In 1933, the three brothers Leonard, Wallace and Walter Spence won the 3×100 medley relay at the Amateur Athletic Union (AAU) championships – the only such feat in the AAU history. Later, they set a world record in this event. Leonard participated in the 1936 Summer Olympics in the 100 m freestyle, 200 m breaststroke and 4 × 200 m freestyle events, but did not reach the finals. In 1967, the Spence brothers were inducted to the International Swimming Hall of Fame.

== Biography ==
Spence was born in a jungle near Christianburg, British Guiana, in a family of four brothers and four sisters. His father was Scottish and worked as a big game hunter and guide, while his mother was Indian (of indigenous American descent, or from India, both are possible in Guyana?). The Spences would swim in the Demerara River, and six family members bore scars from piranha bites. Leonard, Wallace and Walter became competitive swimmers. Their youngest brother, Harold, was also a promising swimmer, but was killed in action in World War II. Two of their sisters also swam competitively, although not at the level of their brothers.

Walter, the eldest brother, soon realized that he can not grow as a swimmer in Guiana, and immigrated to the United States in 1923. Wallace and the youngest brother Leonard followed him in 1926 and 1928, respectively. They formed a 3×100 m medley team and won the AAU championships in 1933, and later set a world record in this event. In 1935, together with Peter Fick, they became AAU champions in the 4 × 100 m medley relay. In their team, Leonard specialized in breaststroke, and at some point held nearly all AAU titles and records from 100 yards to one mile. During 1931–1932, he set two world records in the 200 m breaststroke. However, he also competed in the crawl at the AAU and 1936 Olympics. His career was hampered by tuberculosis; he contracted it around 1931, but realized that only six years later. He died in Mount Pleasant, New York, in 1947.

== See also ==
- List of members of the International Swimming Hall of Fame
