= Jack Medica =

American swimmer

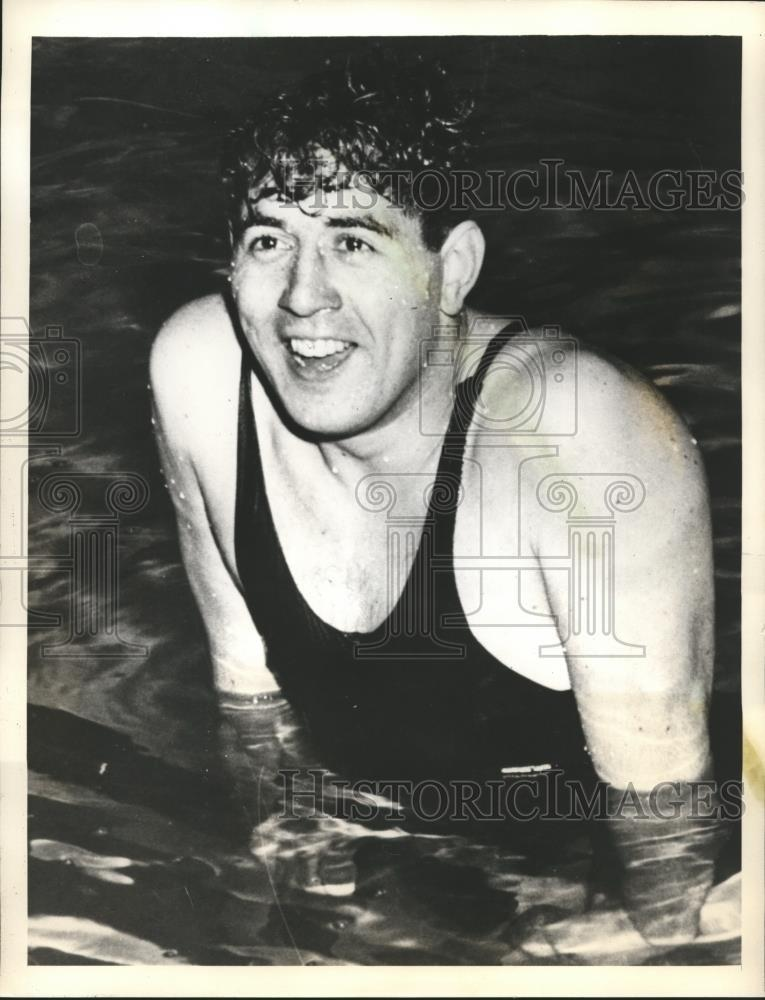
- Medica in 1935

Personal information
- Full name: Jack Chapman Medica
- National team: United States
- Born: October 15, 1914 Seattle, Washington, U.S.
- Died: April 15, 1985 (aged 70) Carson City, Nevada, U.S.
- Spouse: Irene

Sport
- Sport: Swimming
- Strokes: Freestyle
- Club: Washington Athletic Club (WAC)
- College team: University of Washington
- Coach: Ray Daughters (WAC); Jack Torney (U of W)
Medal record
Men's swimming
Representing the United States
Olympic Games
Gold medal – first place	1936 Berlin	400 m freestyle
Silver medal – second place	1936 Berlin	1500 m freestyle
Silver medal – second place	1936 Berlin	4×200 m freestyle

Jack Chapman Medica (October 5, 1914 – April 15, 1985) was an American competition swimmer, who competed for the University of Washington, and was an Olympic champion, and former world record-holder in two events.

Born in Seattle, Washington on October 5, 1914, Medica attended Lincoln High School. He trained and competed with downtown Seattle's Washington Athletic Club coached by Hall of Fame Coach Ray Daughters.

== University of Washington ==
Swimming for the University of Washington from 1934-36, under Head Coach Jack Torney who started the team in 1932, Medica was the university's first All American swimmer. He won nine national collegiate championships at Washington consisting of titles in the 220, 440, and 1500-meter freestyles in three consecutive years. He captured eleven world records for various strokes and distances.

== 1936 Olympics ==
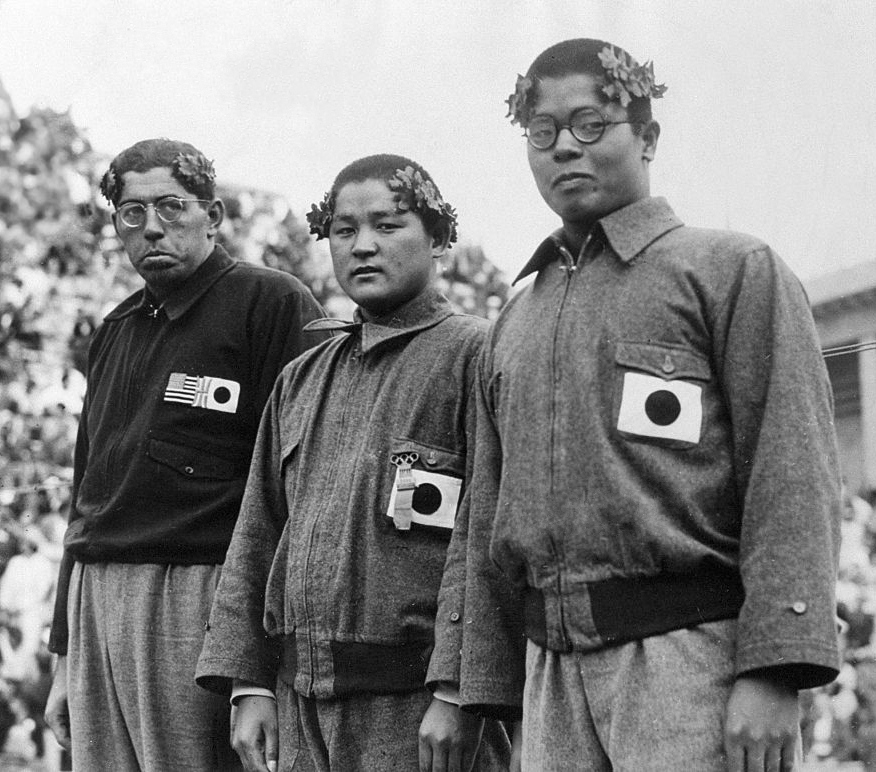
Medica, Noboru Terada, Shunpei Uto at '36 Olympics

As a Senior at Lincoln High School at the mid-August, 1936 Summer Olympics in Berlin, Germany, Medica won a gold medal in the 400-meter freestyle and set a new Olympic record at 4:44.5, joining Adolph Kiefer as the only American swimmer to win a gold medal at the Berlin Olympics. Japanese swimmer Shumpei Uto pulled ahead of Medica, to which Medica responded and narrowed the lead. A burst of speed by Uto increased his lead over Medica but the effort exhausted him. In the final 50 meters, Medica and Uto battled for first place, with Medica finally taking the lead in the last 10 meters.

Medica earned a silver medal for his second-place performance in the 1,500-meter freestyle, recording a final time of 19:34.0. As in the previous Olympics, the two leading competitors in this event were swimmers from the United States and Japan. Noburo Terada, the Japanese gold medalist, took an early lead from the start and never relinquished it, though he finished ahead of Medica by around a half a pool length. Medica and third place bronze medalist Shunpei Uto of Japan had a battle for second place, with Medica finishing only a half a second ahead of the Japanese swimmer.

Medica also received a second silver medal as a member of the runner-up U.S. team in the men's 4×200-meter freestyle relay, together with American teammates Ralph Flanagan, John Macionis and Paul Wolf. As in several other swimming the events, and the American and Japanese teams were considered the favorites. The American relay team finished with a time of 9:03.0, around 12 seconds behind the winning Japanese team.

After completing his college education Medica competed internationally in China, Japan, New Zealand, Cuba, the Philippines, and Europe.

During his elite career, Medica won 10 Amateur Athletic Union (AAU) individual national titles and set 11 world records in distances ranging from 200 meters to one mile. His 200-meter freestyle record set in 1935 stood for nine years, and his 400-meter freestyle record of 1934 stood for seven years. In a sport where records are frequently broken, the time his records endured indicate the magnitude and lasting legacy of his swimming achievements.

== Coaching ==
After his retirement from competition swimming, brought on by World War II, Medica taught water survival for the U.S. Navy after his impaired vision kept him from enlisting. From 1942-44, he served as a swimming coach at Columbia University, then from 1944-1958, Medica served as head coach of the University of Pennsylvania swim team, remaining as a full-time coach and trainer. He continued at Penn as an instructor, a full professor of physical education through his 1976 retirement, and was considered one of the more respected and admired faculty members at the university. He also taught incoming freshmen to swim, notoriously belaying their fears by saying "any damn fool can swim."

Medica died of a heart attack in Carson City, Nevada on April 15, 1985. He had been a former resident of Bryn Mawr, Pennsylvania. He was survived by his wife Irene, four daughters, and two grandchildren.

== Honors ==
He was inducted into the International Swimming Hall of Fame as an "Honor Swimmer" in 1966. He was nominated in each of his college years at Washington University for the Sullivan Award, given to America's top collegiate swimmer. Medica was inducted into the Huskie Hall of Fame at the University of Washington in 1981 and later the Washington Sports Hall of Fame.

== See also ==
- List of members of the International Swimming Hall of Fame
- List of Olympic medalists in swimming (men)
- List of University of Pennsylvania people
- List of University of Washington people
- World record progression 200 metres freestyle
- World record progression 400 metres freestyle

Records
Preceded by Shozo Makino	Men's 400-meter freestyle world record-holder (long course); August 30, 1934 – May 13, 1941	Succeeded by Bill Smith
Preceded by Johnny Weissmuller	Men's 200-meter freestyle world record-holder (long course); April 12, 1935 – February 12, 1944	Succeeded by Bill Smith
