= Dagfinn Nilsen =

Norwegian footballer (1920-1998)

Personal information
- Date of birth: 30 April 1920
- Date of death: 8 August 1998 (aged 78)
- Position: Midfielder

International career
Years	Team	Apps	(Gls)
1952	Norway	1	(0)

Dagfinn Nilsen (30 April 1920 – 8 August 1998) was a Norwegian footballer. He played in one match for the Norway national football team in 1952. He was also part of Norway's squad for the 1952 Summer Olympics, but he did not play in any matches.
