= Ab de Vries =

Dutch footballer (1913–1998)

- De Vries in 1940

Personal information
- Full name: Albert de Vries
- Date of birth: 4 February 1913
- Place of birth: IJmuiden, Netherlands
- Date of death: 17 August 1998 (aged 85)
- Height: 1.80 m (5 ft 11 in)
- Position: Midfielder

Senior career*
Years	Team	Apps	(Gls)
1931–1933	IJFC		
1933–1951	VSV		

International career
1940	Netherlands	1	(0)
- * Club domestic league appearances and goals

Albert "Ab" de Vries (4 February 1913 – 17 August 1998) was a Dutch footballer who played as a midfielder. He played in one match for the Netherlands national football team in 1940.
