= Higazi Said =

Egyptian swimmer (1916–1998)

Personal information
- Born: 1916 Cairo, Egypt
- Died: 30 August 1998 (aged 81–82)

Sport
- Sport: Swimming

Higazi Said (1916 – 30 August 1998) was an Egyptian swimmer. He competed in the men's 4 × 200 metre freestyle relay at the 1936 Summer Olympics.
