= Pierre Hastert =

Luxembourgish swimmer

Personal information
- Born: 9 September 1912 Luxembourg City, Luxembourg
- Died: 23 April 1972 (aged 59) Luxembourg City, Luxembourg

Sport
- Sport: Swimming

Pierre Hastert (9 September 1912 – 23 April 1972) was a Luxembourgish swimmer. He competed in the men's 4 × 200 metre freestyle relay at the 1936 Summer Olympics.
