= Shigeo Sugiura =

Japanese swimmer (1917–1988)

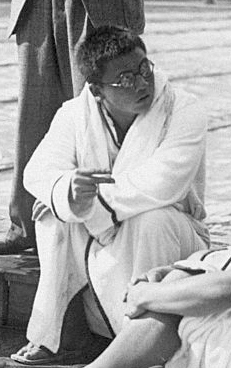
- Shigeo Sugiura at the 1936 Olympics

Personal information
- Born: 10 May 1917 Shizuoka Prefecture, Japan
- Died: 10 April 1988 (aged 70)

Sport
- Sport: Swimming
Medal record
Representing Japan
Olympics
Gold medal – first place	1936 Berlin	4×200 m freestyle relay

Shigeo Sugiura (杉浦 重雄, Sugiura Shigeo; 10 May 1917 – 10 April 1988) was a Japanese freestyle swimmer. At the 1936 Olympics he won a gold medal in the 4 × 200 m freestyle relay, setting a new world record.
