= Ralph Gilman =

American swimmer (1916–1955)

Personal information
- Full name: Ralph Albert Gilman
- National team: United States
- Born: March 25, 1916 Berkeley, California, U.S.
- Died: October 5, 1955 (aged 39) Pacific Grove, California, U.S.
- Spouse: Betty Ann
- Children: 2
- Relatives: Marian Gilman, Olympian

Sport
- Sport: Swimming
- Event: 100, 200, 440 freestyle
- Strokes: Freestyle
- Club: Olympic Club (San Francisco)
- College team: Golden Gate Jr. College (GGJC); Ohio State University
- Coach: George Madera (Golden Gate College); George Schroth (Olympic Club); Mike Peppe (Ohio State)

Ralph Albert Gilman (March 25, 1916 – October 5, 1955) was an American competition freestyle swimmer who was a standout competitor for the Alameda High School swim team. He swam for a year at Ohio State University around 1935-36, and represented the United States in the 1936 Summer Olympics in Berlin, Germany, competing in the men's 4×200-meter freestyle relay. Though the U.S. relay finals team won the silver medal, Gilman was not eligible for the award according to the 1936 Olympic rules, as he swam only in the preliminary heat for the event, though he did help qualify the U.S. team to advance to the finals in which he did not participate.

== Early life and swimming ==
Gilman was born March 25, 1916, one of around four siblings, in Berkeley, California, to mother Ulmer and father Berte Gilman, a machinist for the Southern Pacific Railroad Company. Ralph grew up in nearby Alameda. Graduating around 1934, he attended and swam for Alameda High School under Coach Carl Young, where as a Senior, Ralph was named President of the "Block A" Athletic Society. Otto Rittler was a long serving coach administrator at Alameda High, who may have supervised the swim team, and would attend the Berlin Olympics with Gilman. From an athletic family that supported swimming, he was the younger brother of 1928 Olympic swimmer Marian Gilman. Swimming against Berkeley High School at the ACAL (Alameda County Athletic League) Swimming Championships in Mid-May 1932, Gilman swam a 59.4 a conference record for the 100-yard event and a 2:31.2, a record for the 220-yard freestyle event.

In club competition, Gilman swam for the strong program at San Francisco's Olympic Club, where in February 1932, he won the 100-yard freestyle at the Pacific Association Junior Championship with a time of :58.6 seconds. At the Olympic Club, George Schroth was one of Gilman's primary coaches. Schroth served as a Director of Aquatics for the Olympic Club from 1932 to 1948, and later coached swimming at the University of California Berkeley from 1948 to 1961.

== Collegiate swimming ==
Gilman attended and swam for San Francisco's Golden Gate Junior College "Wandering Raiders", also known as Golden Gate College on 220 Golden Gate Avenue. In the 1930s the college was affiliated with the San Francisco Central YMCA giving them access to pool facilities, and boasted one of the most accomplished collegiate swim teams in America's western states. In its history, the team beat the varsity swim team of both Stanford and the University of California in collegiate competition. Their swimmers set collegiate Pacific Coast records. While swimming for Golden Gate, Gilman was part of a relay team in January 1935 that swam the 3.6 miles across San Francisco Bay from Oakland to San Francisco. At Golden Gate Jr. College, Gilman was coached by George Madera.

Gilman enrolled at Ohio State University on a scholarship in the Fall of 1935, swimming at most a year for their strong program under Hall of Fame Coach Mike Peppe. Peppe coached swimming at Ohio State from 1931 through 1962. Gilman did not return to Ohio State after the 1936 Summer Olympics, completing only around one year at Ohio State, which may have been interrupted by training in his second semester.

== 1936 Olympic trials ==
At the 1936 U.S. Olympic trials, he finished fifth in the 400-meter finals, though he had swum only one second over the Olympic record in a preliminary qualifying event with a time of 4:49.4. Fortunately, on July 12, he finished third in the finals of the 200-meter freestyle event, obtaining a possible later berth on the 4x200 relay team. He had to swim a time trial in Berlin to secure his spot on the 4x200 relay team.

== 1936 Berlin Olympics ==
At the 1936 Berlin Olympics, Gilman swam for the silver medal-winning U.S. team in the first round of the men's 4×200-meter freestyle relay that later swam the event in a combined time of 9:03.0. Japan, a pre-game favorite, took the gold with an Olympic record time of 8:51.5, and the team from Hungary took the bronze medal with a time of 9:13.3. The Japanese team broke the Olympic record in their preliminary heat, with a time of 8:56.1, which they had first set in the 1932 Olympics. Gilman swam lead-off for the U.S. team in the Heat 2 preliminary with U.S. swimmers Jack Medica and Paul Wolf that swam a combined time of 9:10.4, qualifying for a later round. He did not receive a medal, however, because only those relay swimmers who competed in the event final were medal-eligible under the 1936 Olympic swimming rules.

At an International YMCA Championship in 1935, he set a record of 4:33.4 for the 440-yard freestyle.

In 1941, Ralph's father Berte died at the age of 56 of an apparent heart attack while swimming in the San Francisco bay.

=== Careers ===
In his early career after leaving swimming, he worked for a California-based steamship business, where he ascended to an executive role. After 1945, having been familiar with the hospitality business, Gilman worked with Oakland's Trader Vic's Restaurant and Monterey's Crocodile Tail's Restaurant by 1950 where he was in business with wife Betty Ann. Through 1955, he worked at Monterey's Gallatin's Restaurant as an Assistant Manager.

=== Death ===
On the evening of October 4, 1955, at the age of 39, Gilman died in an auto accident at the Carmel-Pacific Grove cut-off. Likely losing control of the car, his vehicle swerved on an embankment of the winding road, outside Pacific Grove, California. Though his car overturned, he was survived by his wife Betty Ann who was not seriously injured in the accident as she was thrown clear. He had been scheduled to appear at the dedication of a new Alameda swimming center on October 9. Not present at the accident were his daughter and a son Ralph Jr. who swam for Lowell High School. Funeral services were held at the Dorney-Farlinger Memorial Chapel at mid-day October 8, 1955.

== See also ==
- List of Ohio State University people
