= Al-Qarshi Abd ur-Raheem Salaam =

Yemeni poet and playwright

Al-Qarshi Abd ur-Raheem Salaam (1936 – 4 August 1998) was a Yemeni poet and playwright. He was one of the early proponents of the modern prose poem in Yemeni literature. He also wrote plays, among which are Salaat at-Turaab (The Soil Prayer) and Ma’ish-Shams Yaji’oun (They Came with the Sun).
