= Heikki Hietanen =

Finnish swimmer

Personal information
- Born: 30 August 1914 Helsinki, Finland
- Died: 27 May 2000 (aged 85) Helsinki, Finland

Sport
- Sport: Swimming

Heikki Hietanen (30 August 1914 – 27 May 2000) was a Finnish freestyle swimmer. He competed in two events at the 1936 Summer Olympics.
