= Mossie Guttormsen =

Australian cricketer

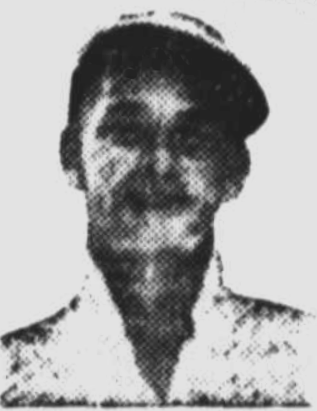

Personal information
- Born: 29 July 1916; Brisbane, Queensland, Australia
- Died: 8 August 1996 (aged 80); Brisbane, Queensland, Australia
- Source: Cricinfo, 3 October 2020

Mossie Guttormsen (29 July 1916 – 8 August 1998) was an Australian cricketer. He played in four first-class matches for Queensland between 1936 and 1939.

Guttormsen was playing for Easts in Brisbane Grade Cricket in one of their reserve sides as early as 1930, and he participated in a school sports tournament in 1931 captaining a side and receiving a prize for achieving the best batting average.

Guttormsen achieved success in October 1938 when he took four catches while conceding no byes and also scored 66 runs in a match for Easts, and he scored 68 for the club in November. As of January 1939 he had begun opening the batting for Easts and scored a 97 early that month, although he took 115 minutes to reach fifty. In November 1939 he was named in the Queensland First-class side as a reserve keeper.

== See also ==
- List of Queensland first-class cricketers
