= Wolfgang Heimlich =

German swimmer

Personal information
- Born: March 1, 1917 Ruszowice, German Empire

Sport
- Sport: Swimming
Medal record
Representing Germany
European Championships
Gold medal – first place	1938 London	4x200m freestyle relay

Wolfgang Heimlich (born 1 March 1917, date of death unknown) was a German swimmer who competed in the 1936 Summer Olympics.
