= Charlie Chan (swimmer) =

Chinese swimmer

Personal information
- Nationality: Chinese
- Born: 2 February 1911

Sport
- Sport: Swimming

Charlie Chan (born 2 February 1911) was a Chinese swimmer. He competed in the men's 100 metre freestyle at the 1936 Summer Olympics.
