= Piet Bakers =

Dutch footballer

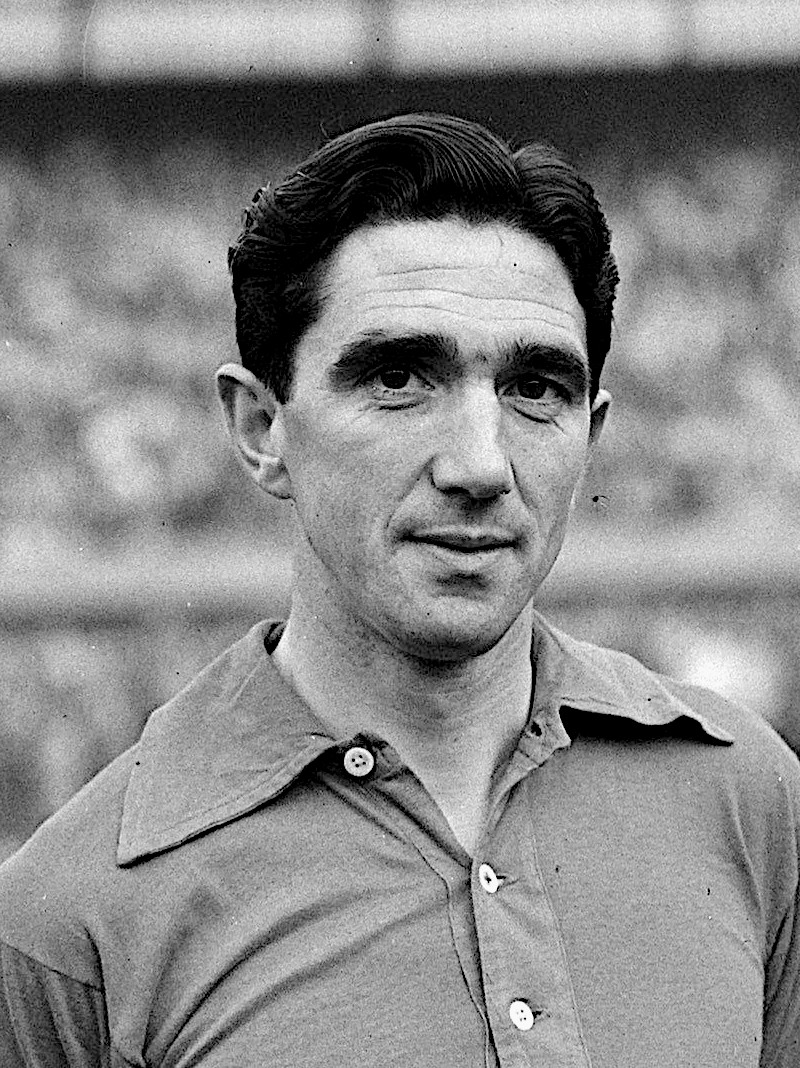

Personal information
- Date of birth: 5 September 1922
- Place of birth: Eindhoven, Netherlands
- Date of death: 14 August 1998 (aged 75)
- Position: Defender

Youth career
- 1938-1941: Nuenen

Senior career*
Years	Team	Apps	(Gls)
1942-1955	PSV	180	(11)
1955–1956	Brabantia		
1956-1957	Holland Sport	21	(0)

International career
1951	Netherlands	1	(0)
- * Club domestic league appearances and goals

Piet Bakers (5 September 1922 – 14 August 1998) was a Dutch footballer. He played in one match for the Netherlands national football team in 1951.

He played the majority of his career for PSV, except for a final season at Holland Sport.

== Personal life ==
Bakers lost six family members due to the RAF air raid, targeting the Philips factory on 6 December 1942 during World War II. He also played in the February 1944 game against LONGA, which ended in a raid by the German occupier.

He later was chairman of the PSV academy for 20 years.
