= Draško Vilfan =

Slovenian swimmer

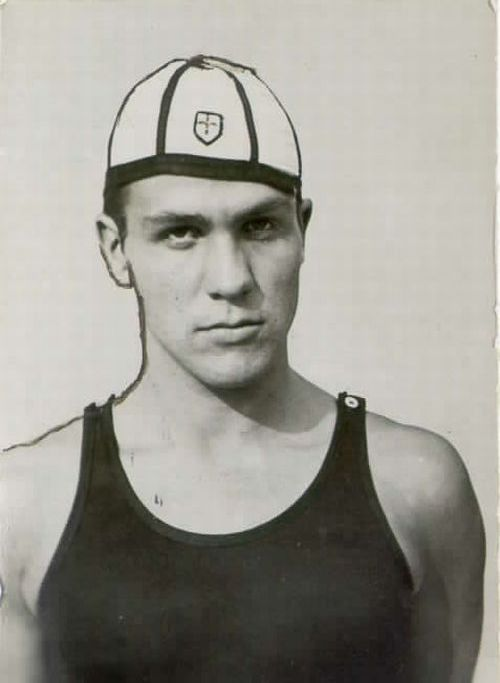

Personal information
- Born: 4 February 1914 Trieste, Austria-Hungary
- Died: 7 May 1996 (aged 82) Ljubljana, Slovenia

Sport
- Sport: Swimming

Draško Vilfan (4 February 1914 – 7 May 1996) was a Slovenian swimmer. He competed in three events at the 1936 Summer Olympics.
