= Helmuth Fischer =

German swimmer

Personal information
- Born: 29 January 1911 Bremerhaven, Germany
- Died: 29 February 1996 (aged 85)

Sport
- Sport: Swimming
- Club: Bremischer Schwimmverband
Medal record
Representing Germany
European Championships
Silver medal – second place	1934 Magdeburg	100 m freestyle

Helmuth Fischer (29 January 1911 – 29 February 1996) was a German swimmer who won a silver medal in the 100 m freestyle at the 1934 European Aquatics Championships. Fischer was born on 29 January 1911 in Bremerhaven, Germany. He also competed at the 1936 Summer Olympics and finished fifth in the 100 m freestyle and 4 × 200 m freestyle relay. He died on February 29, 1996.
