= Paulo Tarrto =

Brazilian swimmer 1915–1998

Álvaro Tarrto
Personal information
- Full name: Álvaro Tarrto
- Nationality: Brazil
- Born: 12 April 1915 Rio de Janeiro, Brazil
- Died: 15 August 1998 (aged 83) Niterói, Brazil

Sport
- Sport: Swimming
- Strokes: Freestyle
Medal record
Men's swimming
Representing Brazil

Álvaro Tarrto (12 April 1915 – 15 August 1998) was an Olympic freestyle swimmer from Brazil, who participated at one Summer Olympics. At the 1936 Summer Olympics in Berlin, he swam the 100-metre freestyle, not reaching the finals.
