= John Macionis =

American swimmer (1916–2012)

Personal information
- Full name: John Joseph Macionis
- National team: United States
- Born: May 27, 1916 Philadelphia, Pennsylvania, U.S.
- Died: February 16, 2012 (aged 95) Charlottesville, Virginia, U.S.

Sport
- Sport: Swimming
- Strokes: Freestyle
- College team: Yale University
Medal record
Men's swimming
Representing the United States
Olympic Games
Silver medal – second place	1936 Berlin	4x200 m freestyle

John Joseph Macionis (/məˈʃoʊnɪs/ mə-SHOH-nis; May 27, 1916 – February 16, 2012) was an American competition swimmer who represented the United States at the 1936 Summer Olympics in Berlin.

== Early life ==
Born in Philadelphia, Macionis swam for Big Brothers, Germantown Y.M.C.A., and Central High School, where he captained the swim team and set a world's record in the 200-yard freestyle in 1933. He spent the next year at Mercersburg Academy (1934), where he swam under coach John "King" Miller and set two additional national freestyle records: According to school legend – as reported in the Mercersburg Magazine in Summer 2008 – it was Macionis who gave Miller the nickname "King". Continuing his swimming career at Yale University (1938), he swam under their legendary coach Bob Kiputh.

Macionis was interviewed for the Mercersburg Academy oral history project in 2008 and recalled his single year at the academy. Macionis said he was the son of working class Lithuanian immigrants, who, in the midst of the Great Depression, could not afford the cost of tuition at the private boarding school. However, "I was able to go to Mercersburg because the people at Big Brothers thought I was a good kid" and academy swim coach John Miller wanted Macionis on his team: "And the head of the board, who was a Princeton man, said that it would be wonderful if someone from Big Brothers went to a good college. So they came up with $200 for Mercersburg. The minimum for Mercersburg was $400 at the time, but John Miller talked to the headmaster (Dr. Boyd Edwards) about my background." Eventually, because Edwards was so impressed with Macionis, the fee was reduced, and Mercersburg gained one of the greatest athletes in its history. The transition from Philadelphia's Central High School to Mercersburg was not easy: "I had to take all the College Board subjects and I flunked them all. No one at Central had even heard of the College Boards." Macionis said all he did in the 1933–34 academic year was swim and study, doing both well enough to gain acceptance at Yale University and, soon after, to win a spot on Yale's championship swim team.

== Yale University, swimming powerhouse ==
In his first year at the New Haven, Connecticut school, he was part of a team of 18 Yale swimmers who created a new American record of 16 minutes 31 seconds in the one mile relay, established in a special attempt in the school's (then) 3-year-old, 6-lane 25-yard pool, during Yale's annual Water Carnival on March 5, 1935. Comparing times from the 1930s with swimmer's times in the late 20th/early 21st century are virtually meaningless, because of the changes in stroke mechanics and rules. Swimmers in the 1930s could not use the flip turn, and were required to touch the wall with their hand first, then initiate a so-called "open turn". The advantage gained by the flip turn can be glimpsed in comparing the Yale swim team's one mile relay record, compared to the 2001 Men's world record time of 14 minutes 10 seconds for the 1,500-meter swim in a Short Course (25-meter pool), which in turn – because of its many flip turns – is faster than the same distance in a Long Course (50-meter) pool (14:34). The 1935 relay race with 18 swimmers, likely consisted of 70 laps, which suggests the first 17 men swam 100 yards (4 laps each), and the final swimmer just 2 laps.

During Macionis' freshman and second years at Yale, the swim team was undefeated (12–0 in 1934–35, and 14–0 in 1935–36). He soon held all of Yale's freestyle records, as well as the school records for the individual medley and the 220-yard breaststroke. He was named captain of the swim team his senior year 1937–38, when the Bulldogs went 10–3.

A Harvard University newspaper provides some results from a Yale-Harvard dual meet held in the Yale pool in March 1936. Yale continued its 12-year undefeated streak, beating Harvard 45–26 for their one hundred fifty-first straight victory. Macionis placed second in the 440-yard freestyle, losing to (Yale captain) Norris Hoyt, whose winning time was 4 minutes 59.8 seconds. Macionis also swam the anchor leg on Yale's winning 400-yard Freestyle relay, with a time of 3 minutes 36 seconds.

A Yale University "Banner Yearbook and Pot Pourri entry for the Class of 1937 (page 224), records the 1936 indoor season for the Bulldog swim team: "On the 13th of February (1936) the Naval Academy was host to the team at Annapolis, and the next day Yale broke pool records and an Intercollegiate mark in the 50-yard pool, (including) Macionis swimming the 440 in 5 minutes 8 and nine-tenths seconds." Yale then hosted the 1936 A.A.U indoor swimming championships, with Macionis scoring 5 points.

=== National Champion in 1935, NCAA Champion in 1937 and 1938 ===
At the 1935 AAU outdoor national championships, held in New York City's 50-meter Manhattan Beach pool in July of that year, he won the 440-yard Freestyle, beating competitors including Jack Medica, Ralph Flanagan, and James Gilhula, all of whom were world record holders at varying freestyle distances.

According to the NCAA's "Swimming and Diving" media guide for 2000, John Macionis won the NCAA title in 1937 in the 1,500 Meter (sic) Freestyle, with a time of 19:58.5 at the University of Minnesota pool: Macionis then successfully defended his collegiate title in 1938, at Rutgers University, with a time of 20:15.2. At the 1937 NCAA championships, Yale finished a distant third to the University of Michigan in the team competition, and was fifth in 1938. At the March 1938 NCAA championships, Macionis was also described as "fast closing" when he took third place in the 220-yard Freestyle.

== 1936 Berlin Olympics ==
In 1936 he became the first Yale swimmer to compete in the Olympic Games. In Berlin in early August, he won a silver medal in the 4×200 m freestyle relay event (August 11, swimming the 2nd leg; USA time 9 minutes and 3.0 seconds) and was fourth in his semi-final of the 400 m freestyle event and did not advance to the 6-man final. Immediately after the Olympics, members of the U.S. swim team, including Macionis, took part in ad hoc barnstorming swim meets in Europe. Due to World War II, the 1940 Summer Olympics were canceled, however a committee established by the International Swimming Hall of Fame recognized those U.S. swimmers who would have qualified for the Olympic Team that year. Macionis was one of those so recognized. He is also a member of the Pennsylvania Swimming Hall of Fame in State College, Pennsylvania.

== World War II and afterwards ==
He served as a commissioned officer in the United States Coast Guard during World War II, attaining the rank of lieutenant commander. After the war he was an executive in the dairy industry in the Philadelphia, Pennsylvania area.

He continued to swim in master's competition and, at age sixty-five, he held five world records for his age group. Macionis was also an active swimming official in the northeast, and especially in the Philadelphia region, for more than fifty years. He retired from officiating in 2009, and the last meet he officiated was an NCAA dual meet between LaSalle University and the University of Pennsylvania. He continued swimming every day until the age of ninety-four, when his health would no longer allow him to continue.

== Family and final years ==
Macionis lived with his wife of 69 years, May Johnston, in Charlottesville, Virginia until his death at age 95. They had two children, John Johnston Macionis and Robert Gordon Macionis.
