= Masaharu Taguchi =

Japanese swimmer (1916–1982)

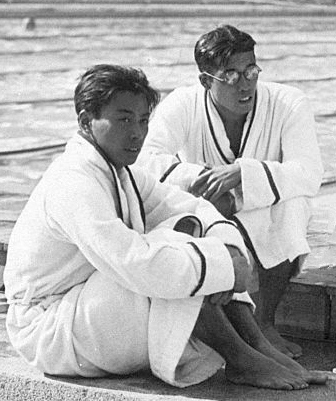
- Masanori Yusa and Masaharu Taguchi (right) at the 1936 Olympics

Personal information
- Born: January 9, 1916 Kyoto Prefecture, Japan
- Died: June 29, 1982 (aged 66)
- Education: Rikkyo University

Sport
- Sport: Swimming
Medal record
Representing Japan
Olympics
Gold medal – first place	1936 Berlin	4×200 m freestyle relay

Masaharu Taguchi (田口 正治, Taguchi Masaharu; January 9, 1916 – June 29, 1982) was a Japanese freestyle swimmer. At the 1936 Olympics, he won a gold medal in the 4 × 200 m relay, setting a new world record. In the individual 100 m race, he finished almost simultaneously with Masanori Yusa and Shigeo Arai and was placed fourth, although photographs suggest he was second.

Taguchi graduated from Rikkyo University, later worked at a Daimaru department store and coached swimming at a local Daimaru swimming club. He was recruited 1961 to prepare the national swimming team for the 1964 Tokyo Olympics.
