= Ferenc Csik =

Hungarian swimmer (1913–1945)

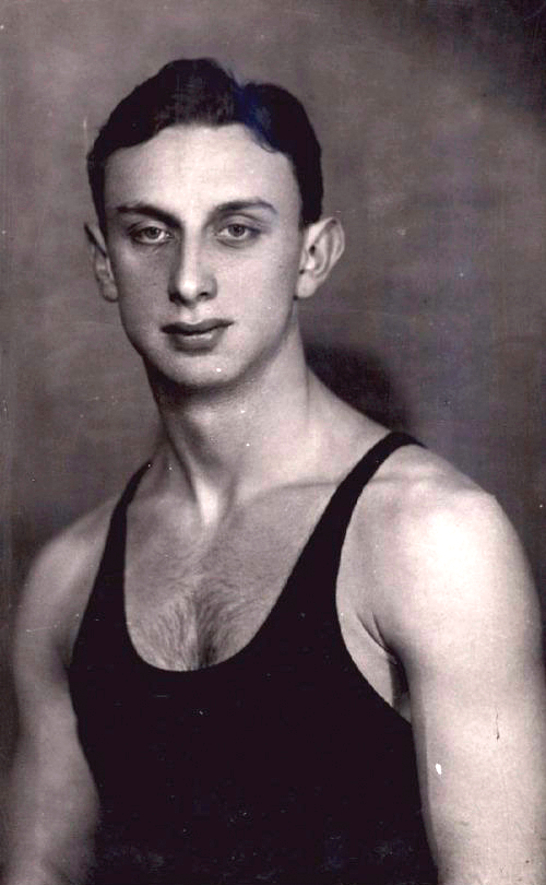

Personal information
- Nationality: Hungary
- Born: 12 December 1913 Kaposvár, Austria-Hungary
- Died: 29 March 1945 (aged 31) Sopron, Hungary

Sport
- Sport: Swimming
- Strokes: Freestyle
- Club: Keszthelyi Törekvés (1930–1931); BEAC (1931–1938)
Medal record
Olympic Games
Representing Hungary
Swimming
Gold medal – first place	1936 Berlin	100 m freestyle
Bronze medal – third place	1936 Berlin	4×200 m freestyle
European Championships
Gold medal – first place	1934 Magdeburg	100 m freestyle
Gold medal – first place	1934 Magdeburg	4×200 m freestyle

Ferenc Csik (12 December 1913 – 29 March 1945) was a Hungarian swimmer who competed in the 1936 Summer Olympics.

In the 1936, Olympics he won a gold medal in the 100 m freestyle event and a bronze medal in the 4×200 m freestyle relay event. Csik went on to become a medical doctor, and died during World War II in an air raid while assisting a wounded man.

== See also ==
- List of members of the International Swimming Hall of Fame
- World record progression 4 × 100 metres freestyle relay
