= John Christensen (swimmer) =

Danish swimmer

Personal information
- Born: 25 May 1915 Copenhagen, Denmark
- Died: 8 March 1996 (aged 80) Copenhagen, Denmark

Sport
- Sport: Swimming

John Christensen (25 May 1915 – 8 March 1996) was a Danish freestyle swimmer. He competed in two events at the 1936 Summer Olympics.
