= Ödön Gróf =

Hungarian swimmer (1915–1997)

Personal information
- Born: April 15, 1915 Neteča, Austria-Hungary
- Died: January 16, 1997 (aged 81)

Sport
- Sport: Swimming
Medal record
Representing Hungary
Olympic Games
Bronze medal – third place	1936 Berlin	4×200 m freestyle
European Championships
Gold medal – first place	1934 Magdeburg	4×200 m freestyle

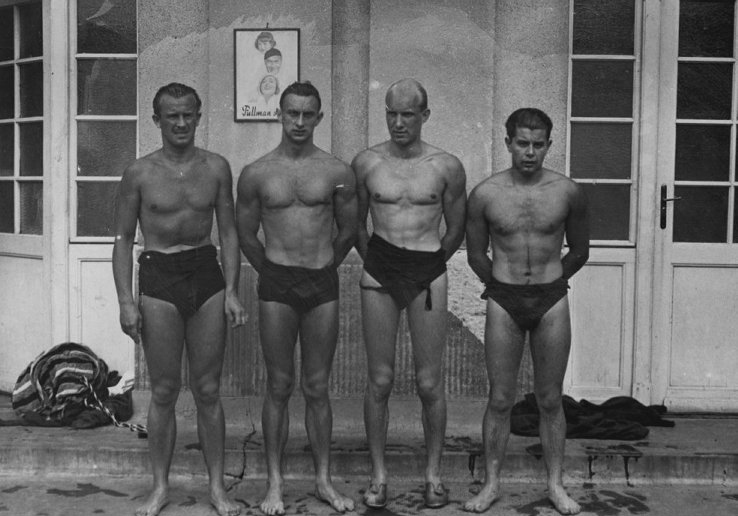
László Szabados & Ferenc Csik & Árpád Lengyel & Ödön Gróf.jpg

Ödön Gróf (15 April 1915 – 16 January 1997) was a Hungarian swimmer who competed in the 1936 Summer Olympics. He was born in Neteča, Kingdom of Croatia-Slavonia, Austria-Hungary.

In the 1936 Olympics he won a bronze medal in the 4 × 200 m freestyle relay event. He was also seventh in his semifinal of the 400 m freestyle event and third in his first round heat of 100 m freestyle event and did not advance in both occasions.
