= Hermann Heibel =

German swimmer

Personal information
- Born: 21 July 1912 Neuwied, Germany
- Died: 19 August 1941 (aged 29) Valovo, Soviet Union

Sport
- Sport: Swimming

Hermann Heibel (21 July 1912 – 19 August 1941) was a German swimmer. He competed in two events at the 1936 Summer Olympics. He was killed in action during World War II while fighting in Operation Barbarossa.
