= Peter Fick =

American swimmer (1913–1980)

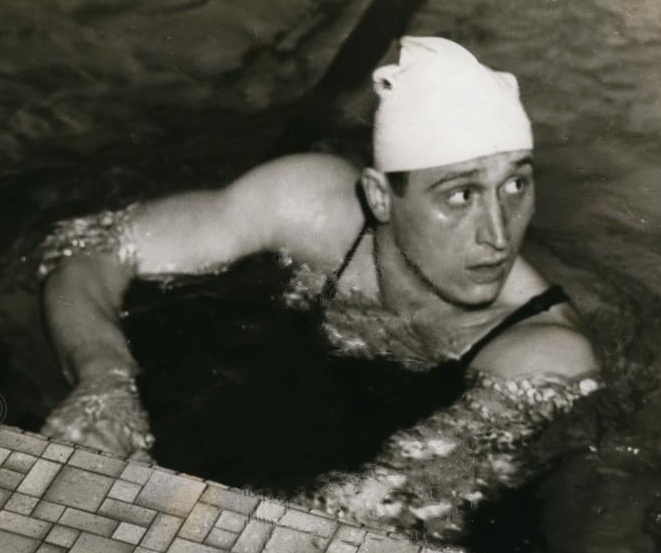
- Fick in 1939

Personal information
- Full name: Peter Joseph Fick
- National team: United States
- Born: December 12, 1913 Philadelphia, Pennsylvania
- Died: August 10, 1980 (aged 66) Miami, Florida, U.S.
- Occupations: Radio actor Swim Instructor; Water Follies swimmer (1939)
- Spouses: Donna Damerel (1940); Bess Johnson Perry (1941); Martha Jones

Sport
- Sport: Swimming
- Strokes: Freestyle
- Club: New York Athletic Club (NYAC)
- College team: Yale University
- Coach: Joseph Ruddy Sr. (NYAC); Robert J. H. Kiphuth (Yale)

Peter Joseph Fick (December 12, 1913 – August 10, 1980) was an American competition swimmer who swam for the New York Athletic Club, and was a former world record-holder in the 100 meter and 4x100 meter freestyle events. He competed for Yale University, and participated in the 1936 Berlin Olympics where he placed sixth in his signature event the 100-meter freestyle. Outside of his competitive swimming career, he worked as a radio actor in New York, and was a WWII era veteran who reached the rank of Lieutenant Commander as a physical education instructor and administrator teaching officers to swim. He retired to Miami, Florida in the 1950's where he taught swimming and managed recreational programs.

== Early life ==
Fick was born December 12, 1913 in Philadelphia, Pennsylvania to former Ukrainian nationals Michael and Anna Piakowski Fick. At 19, he represented the Philadelphia Elks where he was coached by Frank Purtell and Assistant Bill Watson. Swimming with the Elks on January 20, 1933, Fick swam anchor in the 3x100 yard medley relay winning a District Championship event at the Penn Athletic Club in the 3x100 yard medley with a time of 3:21.6, a new district record. By 18, he usually represented the New York Athletic Club, where he was likely coached for at least a portion of his career by 1904 Olympic gold medalist Joseph Ruddy Senior.

== World records ==
Fick held the 100 meter World Record in the 1930's. At only 20, in March, 1934, while representing the New York Athletic Club, he broke Johnny Weissmuller’s record for the 100 meters of 57.4 with a time of 56.8. He broke his own record in 1935 swimming a recorded time of 56.6. In 1936, he again broke his standing world record with a time of 56.4. He was the anchor swimmer on an American 4x100 metre relay that in 1938 broke the world record with a time of 3:59.2, becoming the inaugural relay 4x100 team to go under four minutes. He retired from swimming by 1940, or would have been a pre-game favorite for the Olympics that year, though no Olympics was held that year.

Flick won the National AAU championship for the sprint distance in 1935 and 1936.

== Yale University ==
He swam for Hall of Fame Coach Bob Kiphuth while attending Yale University. During his time at Yale, he held the world record for the 100-meter distance, though he never won a National Collegiate title or the equivalent of an NCAA title during his tenure at the University.

== 1936 Berlin Olympics ==
Fick represented the United States at the 1936 Summer Olympics in Berlin, Germany. He had been a world record-holder and was a pre-race favorite, but finished sixth overall in the event final of the 100-meter freestyle with a time of 59.7 seconds. Several American officials who viewed photos of the finish believe he finished in better than sixth place, and a controversy resulted as to his correct order of finish. In 1978 he was inducted into the International Swimming Hall of Fame.

In the WWII era, Fick served in the U.S. Navy training officers to swim. When he left the Navy, he had reached the rank of Lieutenant Commander.

=== Marriages ===
Fick was married to New York radio actress Bess Johnson Perry on June 10, 1941 in Elkins, West Virginia though they divorced in Florida in 1969 and he soon married Martha Jones. In January, 1940, had previously married Donna Damerel, who died giving birth to his son on February 14, 1941. Damrel was a former vaudeville actress, and a well-known radio actor and announcer of the Mryt and Marge semi-biographical radio show in the 1930's which she performed with her mother Myrtle.

=== Careers ===
He worked as a radio actor in New York, and starred in the Water Follies at the New York World's Fair in 1939. In the 1950's, he relocated to Miami, Florida where he taught swimming and managed recreational programs at area hotels. He and his wife Martha Jones bought a farm in Monroe County near Sinks Grove in 1975.

=== Honors ===
Fick became a member of the International Swimming Hall of Fame in 1938 and was a member of the Helms Hall of Fame.

He died August 10, 1980 in Miami, Florida and was survived by a son Donald. His wife, Martha Jones Fick pre-deceased him on May 27, 1980, and a service was held for her at Miami's Lithgow Chapel on May 31, 1980. In Miami, he was active in VFW Post 4530. Memorial services were held for Peter Fick on August 16, 1980 at Miami's Lithgow Chapel on 54th Street.

== See also ==
- List of members of the International Swimming Hall of Fame
- World record progression 100 metres freestyle
- World record progression 4 × 100 metres freestyle relay
