= Manoel (name) =

Manoel (Portuguese archaic spelling of Manuel) is a surname and a male given name. Notable people with the name include:

== Surname ==
- Elias Manoel (born 2001), Brazilian football winger and striker
- Felipe Manoel (born 1989), Brazilian football midfielder
- Marcel Manoël, president of the National Council of the Reformed Church in France 2001–2010
- Sandro Manoel (born 1988), Brazilian football midfielder
- Sérgio Manoel (disambiguation), multiple people
- Viktor Manoel (born 1957), Mexican–American dancer, choreographer, writer, and actor

== Given name ==
- Manoel Afonso Júnior (born 1991), or Alfonso, Brazilian football forward
- Manoel de Aguiar Fagundes (1907–1953), or Manoelzinho, Brazilian football striker
- Manoel Alencar do Monte (1892–?), or Alencar, Brazilian footballer
- Manoel Almeida Júnior (born 1985), or Pirão, Brazilian football defender
- Manoel da Costa Ataíde (1762—1830), Brazilian painter and sculptor
- Manoel de Barros (1916–2014), Brazilian poet
- Manoel Beckman (1630–1685), Brazilian trader
- Manoel Braga (1902–1955), Brazilian sports shooter
- Manoel Victor Cavalcante (1958–2022), Brazilian politician
- Manoel Carlos (born 1933), Brazilian screenwriter, director, producer, and actor
- Manoel Carlos de Lima Filho (born 1964), or Neco, Brazilian football winger and manager
- Manoel Cassiano de Freitas (born 1963), or Freitas, Brazilian football forward
- Manoel Ceia Laranjeira (1903–1994), Brazilian Bishop of the Independent Catholicism movement
- Manoel Cordeiro Valença Neto (born 1982), or Valença, Brazilian football defender
- Manoel de Sousa Coutinho (1555–1632), or Luís de Sousa, Portuguese monk and writer
- Manoel Cruz (born 1970), Brazilian jockey
- Manoël Dall'igna (born 1985), French rugby sevens forward
- Manoel Dias Soeiro (1604–1657), or Menasseh Ben Israel, Portuguese rabbi, kabbalist, and printer
- Manoel Felciano (born 1970), American actor, singer, and songwriter
- Manuel de Brito Filho (born 1983), or Obina, Brazilian football striker
- Manoel Francisco de Andrade Spina (born 1955), or Chico Spina, Brazilian football forward
- Manoel Gomes (born 1969), Brazilian singer and composer
- Manoel Jacintho Coelho (1903–1991), Brazilian writer
- Manoel José Dias (1940–2004), or Manoelzinho, Brazilian football forward
- Manoel Júnior (born 1976), Brazilian football midfielder
- Manoel Lourenço (1907–1966), Brazilian swimmer
- Manoel Maria (born 1948), Brazilian football winger and manager
- Manoel Messias (born 1996), Brazilian triathlete
- Manoel Messias Barbosa da Silva (born 1985), or Maranhão, Brazilian football defender
- Manoel Messias de Mello (1904-1994), or Messias de Mello, Brazilian illustrator and painter
- Manoel Messias Silva Carvalho (born 1990), Brazilian football defender
- Manoel Miluir (born 1948), or Miluir Macedo, Brazilian football manager
- Manoel Morais Amorim (born 1984), or Morais, Brazilian football midfielder
- Manoel do Nascimento (born 1926), Brazilian boxer
- Manoel Nunes (1895–1977), or Neco, Brazilian football midfielder
- Manoel de Oliveira (1908–2015), Portuguese film director and screenwriter
- Manoel Pereira (1625–1688), Portuguese Roman Catholic prelate in Brazil
- Manoel Pessanha (1918–2003), or Lelé, Brazilian footballer
- Manoel Pinto da Fonseca (slave trader) (1804–1855), Portuguese slave trader in Brazil
- Manoel Rezende de Mattos Cabral (born 1950), or Nelinho, Brazilian football defender
- Manoel Henriques Ribeiro (1945–2022), Brazilian politician
- Manoel Cristiano Ribeiro Lemes (born 1989), Brazilian football forward
- Manoel Fredrick Santos (1935–2020), or Manny Santos, Australian weightlifter
- Manoel Santos (boxer) (1940–2013), or Manny Santos, Tongan-born New Zealand boxer
- Manoel Santos Filho (born 1980), or Itaparica, Brazilian-born Hong Kong football midfielder
- Manoel Segundo Jardim Júnior (born 1991), Brazilian football striker
- Manoel da Silva (born 1919), Portuguese sports shooter
- Manoel da Silva Costa (1953–2015), Brazilian football forward
- Manoel da Silva Filho (born 1978), Brazilian football forward
- Manoel Soto (1944–2019), Spanish Socialist Workers' Party politician
- Manoel Tobias (born 1971), Brazilian futsal player
- Manoel Victor Filho (1927—1995), Brazilian painter, illustrator, and cartoonist
- Manoel Villar (1912–2011), Brazilian swimmer
- Manoel de Castro Villas Bôas (1907–1979), Brazilian entrepreneur, writer, and journalist
- António Manoel de Vilhena (1663–1736), Portuguese nobleman

== See also ==
- Manuel (name), a given name and surname
