= Swimming at the 1932 Summer Olympics =

Swimming at the Games of the X Olympiad
- Venue: LA84 Foundation/John C. Argue Swim Stadium
- Dates: 6–13 August 1932
- No. of events: 11
- Competitors: 128 from 20 nations

At the 1932 Summer Olympics in Los Angeles, eleven swimming events were contested, six for men and five for women. The competitions were held from Saturday, August 6, to Saturday, August 13, 1932. There was a total of 128 participants from 20 countries competing.

== Medal table ==
Rank	Nation	Gold	Silver	Bronze	Total
1	Japan	5	5	2	12
2	United States	5	2	3	10
3	Australia	1	1	0	2
4	Netherlands	0	2	0	2
5	France	0	1	0	1
6	Great Britain	0	0	2	2
7	Denmark	0	0	1	1
7	Hungary	0	0	1	1
7	Philippines	0	0	1	1
7	South Africa	0	0	1	1
Totals (10 entries)		11	11	11	33

== Medal summary ==
=== Men's events ===
Games	Gold	Silver	Bronze
100 m freestyle	Yasuji Miyazaki; Japan	Tatsugo Kawaishi; Japan	Albert Schwartz; United States
400 m freestyle	Buster Crabbe; United States	Jean Taris; France	Tsutomu Ōyokota; Japan
1500 m freestyle	Kusuo Kitamura; Japan	Shozo Makino; Japan	Jim Cristy; United States
100 m backstroke	Masaji Kiyokawa; Japan	Toshio Irie; Japan	Kentaro Kawatsu; Japan
200 m breaststroke	Yoshiyuki Tsuruta; Japan	Reizo Koike; Japan	Teófilo Yldefonso; Philippines
4 × 200 m freestyle relay	Japan; Yasuji Miyazaki; Hisakichi Toyoda; Takashi Yokoyama; Masanori Yusa	United States; Frank Booth; George Fissler; Maiola Kalili; Manuella Kalili	Hungary; István Bárány; László Szabados; András Székely; András Wanié

=== Women's events ===
Games	Gold	Silver	Bronze
100 m freestyle	Helene Madison; United States	Willy den Ouden; Netherlands	Eleanor Saville; United States
400 m freestyle	Helene Madison; United States	Lenore Kight; United States	Jenny Maakal; South Africa
100 m backstroke	Eleanor Holm; United States	Bonnie Mealing; Australia	Valerie Davies; Great Britain
200 m breaststroke	Clare Dennis; Australia	Hideko Maehata; Japan	Else Jacobsen; Denmark
4 × 100 m freestyle relay	United States; Helen Johns; Helene Madison; Josephine McKim; Eleanor Saville	Netherlands; Corrie Laddé; Willy den Ouden; Puck Oversloot; Maria Vierdag	Great Britain; Joyce Cooper; Valerie Davies; Edna Hughes; Helen Varcoe

== Participating nations ==
128 swimmers from 20 nations competed.

- Argentina (5)
- Australia (5)
- Brazil (8)
- Canada (14)
- Denmark (2)
- Finland (1)
- France (5)
- Germany (2)
- Great Britain (13)
- Hungary (5)

- India (1)
- Italy (2)
- Japan (23)
- Mexico (3)
- Netherlands (5)
- Norway (1)
- Philippines (3)
- South Africa (1)
- Sweden (2)
- United States (27)
