= Swimming at the 1932 Summer Olympics – Men's 4 × 200 metre freestyle relay =

Men's 4 × 200 metre freestyle relay at the Games of the X Olympiad
- Venue: LA84 Foundation/John C. Argue Swim Stadium
- Dates: August 9, 1932
- Competitors: 28 from 7 nations
- Teams: 7
- Winning time: 8:58.4 WR

Medalists
1st place, gold medalist(s)		Yasuji Miyazaki, Masanori Yusa, Takashi Yokoyama, Hisakichi Toyoda	Japan
2nd place, silver medalist(s)		Frank Booth, George Fissler, Maiola Kalili, Manuella Kalili	United States
3rd place, bronze medalist(s)		András Wanié, László Szabados, András Székely, István Bárány	Hungary

The men's 4 × 200 metre freestyle relay was a swimming event held as part of the swimming at the 1932 Summer Olympics programme. It was the sixth appearance of the event, which was established in 1908. The competition was held on Tuesday, 9 August 1932.

Twenty-eight swimmers from seven nations competed.

== Records ==
These were the standing world and Olympic records (in minutes) prior to the 1932 Summer Olympics.

World record	9:34.0	(Hungary) András Wanié (Hungary) László Szabados (Hungary) András Székely (Hungary) István Bárány	Paris (FRA)	1931
Olympic record	9:36.2	(United States) Austin Clapp (United States) Walter Laufer (United States) George Kojac (United States) Johnny Weissmuller	Amsterdam (NED)	9 August 1928

Japan set a new world record with 8:58.4 minutes. They bettered the standing world record by more than 35 seconds and broke the nine-minute barrier.

== Results ==
As there were only seven nation who competed in this event only a final was held.

Final

Place	Swimmers	Time	Leg 1	Leg 2	Leg 3	Leg 4
1	Yasuji Miyazaki, Masanori Yusa, Hisakichi Toyoda, and Takashi Yokoyama (JPN)	8:58.4 WR	2:14.1	2:14.7	2:14.8	2:14.8
2	Frank Booth, George Fissler, Maiola Kalili, and Manuella Kalili (USA)	9:10.5	2:20.2	2:17.0	2:18.6	2:17.7
3	András Wanié, László Szabados, András Székely, and István Bárány (HUN)	9:31.4	2:25.8	2:26.5	2:21.3	2:17.8
4	George Larson, George Burrows, Munroe Bourne, and Walter Spence (CAN)	9:36.3	2:26.0	2:28.0	2:24.0	2:18.3
5	Joseph Whiteside, Bob Leivers, Reginald Sutton, and Mostyn Ffrench-Williams (GBR)	9:45.8	2:27.4	2:25.8	2:25.3	2:27.1
6	Carlos Kennedy, Leopoldo Tahier, Roberto Peper, and Alfredo Rocca (ARG)	10:13.1				
7	Manoel Lourenço, Isaac Moraes, Manoel Villar, and Benvenuto Nunes (BRA)	10:36.5				
