= Manoelzinho =

Manoelzinho is a nickname, a diminutive for Manoel. It may refer to:

- Manoelzinho (footballer, born 1907) (1907-1953), Manoel de Aguiar Fagundes, Brazilian football striker
- Manoelzinho (footballer, born 1940) (1940-2004), Manoel José Dias, Brazilian football forward
