= List of Native American sportspeople =

This is a list of North American sportspeople of Native American or Indigenous North American ancestry.

== American & Canadian football ==
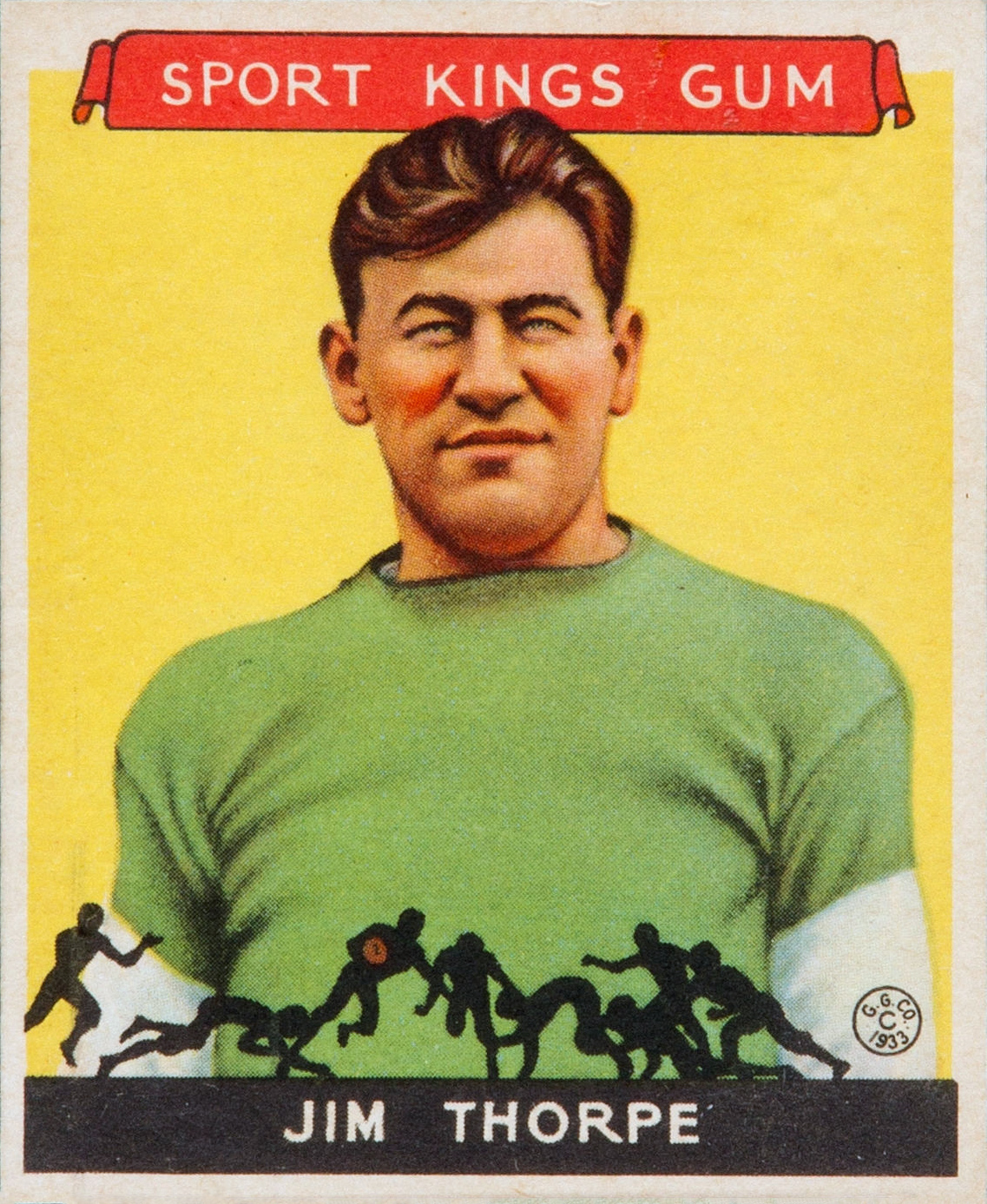
Jim Thorpe played football, baseball and basketball professionally and won Olympic medals in athletics

- Bud Adams, Cherokee Nation, owner of the Houston/Tennessee Oilers/Titans
- Keenan Allen, Lumbee wide receiver for the Los Angeles Chargers
- Eli Ankou, Ojibwe Dokis First Nation defensive tackle for the Buffalo Bills
- Sam Bradford, Cherokee Nation, quarterback, 2010 first overall draft pick and Offensive Rookie of the Year
- Tyler Bray, Potawatomi, quarterback
- Austin Corbett, Walker River Northern Paiute, offensive guard, Super Bowl LVI champion with the Los Angeles Rams.
- Dane Evans, Wichita, Hamilton Tiger-Cats, quarterback
- Xavier Guillory, Nez Perce, Baltimore Ravens, Wide Receiver
- Al Hoptowit, Yakima, American football player, right tackle, 1943 NFL Champion.
- Levi Horn, Northern Cheyenne, offensive tackle
- Creed Humphrey, Potawatomi, Kansas City Chiefs, center, a Super Bowl LVII champion.
- Jack Jacobs, Muscogee, NFL Champion
- Wahoo McDaniel, Choctaw-Chickasaw, played defensive back for different American Football League (AFL) teams between 1960 and 1968. 1960 AFL Champion. Later became a professional wrestler.
- Shiyazh Pete, Navajo-Salish, offensive tackle.
- Bryce Petty, Chicksaw, quarterback.
- Malcolm Rodriguez, Cherokee, linebacker
- Teton Saltes, Oglala, professional football player signed by the New York Jets of the NFL (2021), offensive tackle Later joined XFL team Arlington Renegades in 2023, He is a 2023 XFL Champion.
- Sonny Sixkiller, Cherokee, quarterback
- Jakeb Sullivan, Cheyenne River Lakota Sioux, quarterback
- Lance Taylor, MOWA Choctaw, head coach of the Western Michigan Broncos and former running back
- Jim Thorpe (Sac and Fox Nation, 1887–1953), Olympic Gold medalist and football and baseball player. Won titles as both a player and team executive of the Canton Bulldogs.
- Wes Walker, Cherokee-Kaw Nation, former wide receiver for the Washington Commanders
- James Winchester, Choctaw, Kansas City Chiefs, long snapper, a Super Bowl LIV and Super Bowl LVII champion

=== Oorang Indians players ===
Cherokee

- Stan Powell
- Emmett McLemore
- Stillwell Saunooke

Chippewa

- Arrowhead
- Napoleon Barrel
- Leon Boutwell
- Ted Buffalo
- Xavier Downwind
- Gray Horse
- Joe Guyon
- Ted St. Germaine
- Baptiste Thunder

Cupeño

- Woodchuck Welmas

Flathead

- Nick Lassa

Mission

- Reggie Attache
- Pete Calac

Mohawk

- Bob Hill
- Joe Little Twig

Mohican

- Eagle Feather

Pomo

- Elmer Busch

Sac and Fox

- Bill Newashe
- Jack Thorpe
- Jim Thorpe

Winnebago

- Bill Winneshiek

Wyandotte

- Al Jolley

== Athletics ==
- Ellison "Tarzan" Brown, Narragansett. Two-time winner of the Boston Marathon and competed in the marathon at the 1936 Summer Olympics.
- Angela Chalmers, Dakota. Bronze medalist in the 3000 m at the 1992 Summer Olympics and first Indigenous female athlete to win a medal for Canada.
- Wilson “Buster” Charles, Oneida. Competed in the decathlon at the 1932 Summer Olympics.
- Alex Decouteau, Plains Cree. Competed in the 5000 m at the 1912 Summer Olympics for Canada.
- Peter Deer, Mohawk. Competed in the 800 and 1500m for Canada at the 1904 Summer Olympics.
- Deerfoot, Seneca. Famed 19th-century touring runner with world records in multiple distances.
- Patti Catalano Dillon, Mi'kmaw. First American woman to break 2:30 in the marathon. Runner up in the 1980 New York City and 1979-1981 Boston Marathons.
- Rosalie Fish, Cowlitz. Former for Iowa Central Community College and the University of Washington and advocate for Missing and Murdered Indigenous Women.
- Alicia Guerrero, Tolowa. Bronze medalist in shot put and discus at the 2025 World Para Athletics Championships.
- Janee' Kassanavoid, Comanche. Two-time medalist in the hammer throw at the World Athletics Championships, 2022-2023, and the first Native American woman medalist.
- Joe Keeper, Cree. Competed in the 5000 and 10,000 m for Canada at the 1912 Summer Olympics.
- Tom Longboat, Onandaga. Winner of the Boston Marathon and competed in marathon in the 1908 Summer Olympics for Canada.
- Cheri Madsen, Omaha. Wheelchair racing paralympian with 10 total medals from the 1996 Summer Paralympics, 2000 Summer Paralympics, 2016 Summer Paralympics, and 2020 Summer Paralympics.
- Billy Mills, Oglala Lakota. Gold medalist in the 10,000 m at the 1964 Summer Olympics and the only athlete from the Americas to win the event.
- Andy Payne, Cherokee. Ultradistance runner.
- Frank Pierce, Seneca. First Native American to represent the United States at the Olympics, racing the marathon in 1904.
- María Lorena Ramírez, Rarámuri. Ultradistance runner.
- Albert Smoke, Mississaugas. Third place finisher at the Boston Marathon. Competed for Canada in the marathon at the 1920 Summer Olympics.
- Andrew Sockalexis, Penobscot. Fourth place finisher in the marathon at the 1912 Summer Olympics and two-time Boston Marathon runner-up.
- Louis Tewanima, Hopi. Silver medalist in the 10,000 m at the 1912 Summer Olympics and competed in the marathon at the 1908 Summer Olympics.
- Jim Thorpe, Sauk. Gold medalist in the decathlon and pentathlon at the 1912 Summer Olympics and first Native American gold medalist for the U.S.

== Baseball ==
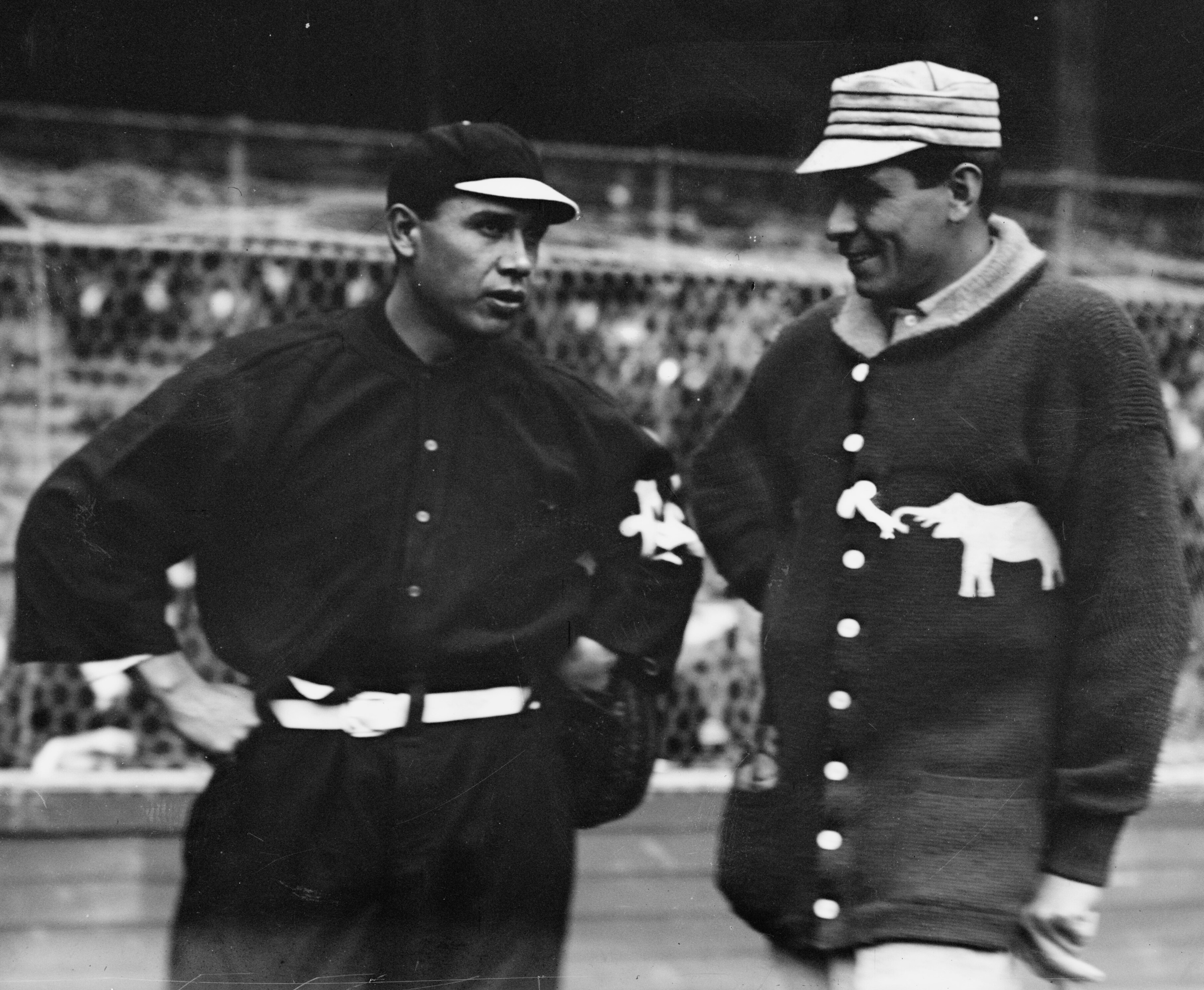
Chief Meyers (left) and Chief Bender during the 1911 World Series

- Jack Aker, Potawatomi, pitcher
- Brandon Bailey, Chickasaw, pitcher for the Houston Astros
- Mike Balenti, Cheyenne, shortstop
- Dallas Beeler, Chickasaw, pitcher for the Chicago Cubs
- Johnny Bench, Choctaw, Hall of Fame catcher with the Cincinnati Reds, two-time MVP
- Chief Bender, White Earth Ojibwe, Hall of Fame pitcher
- Jim Bluejacket, Cherokee, pitcher
- Lou Bruce, Mohawk, outfielder for the Philadelphia Athletics
- Dylan Bundy, Cherokee Nation, pitcher
- Joba Chamberlain, Ho-Chunk, pitcher
- Virgil Cheeves, Cherokee, pitcher
- Chief Chouneau, Fond du Lac Band of Lake Superior Chippewa, pitcher who appeared in one game for the Chicago White Sox
- Lee Daney, Choctaw, pitcher
- Jacoby Ellsbury, Navajo, All-Star outfielder, Gold Glove winner and two-time Word Series champion
- Koda Glover, Cherokee-descent, pitcher for the Washington Nationals
- Marco Gonzales, pitcher
- Jon Gray, Cherokee Nation, pitcher
- Ryan Helsley, Cherokee Nation, pitcher
- Adrian Houser, Cherokee Nation, pitcher
- Chief Johnson, Ho-Chunk, pitcher
- Frank Jude, Mille Lacs Ojibwe, Major League Baseball outfielder
- Ike Kahdot, Potawatomi, third baseman for the Cleveland Indians
- Louis Leroy, Stockbridge–Munsee, Major League Baseball pitcher
- Gene Locklear, Lumbee, outfielder
- Kyle Lohse, Nomlaki, Major League Baseball pitcher
- Bobby Madritsch, Lakota, Major League Baseball pitcher
- Paddy Mayes, Cherokee, outfielder for the Philadelphia Phillies
- Pryor McBee, Choctaw, pitcher who appeared in one game for the Chicago White Sox
- Chief Meyers, Cahuilla, Major League Baseball catcher
- Euel Moore, Chickasaw, Major League Baseball pitcher
- Robbie Ray, Cherokee-descent, pitcher
- Allie Reynolds, Creek, six-time All-Star pitcher
- Charlie Roy, White Earth Ojibwe, pitcher for the Philadelphia Phillies
- Louis Sockalexis, Penobscot, Major League Baseball player
- Jim Thorpe, Sac and Fox Nation, Olympic Gold medalist and football and baseball player
- Ben Tincup, Cherokee, pitcher
- Wyatt Toregas, Chickasaw, Major League Baseball catcher
- John Vann, Cherokee, catcher
- Moses Yellow Horse, Pawnee, pitcher for the Pittsburgh Pirates

== Ice hockey ==
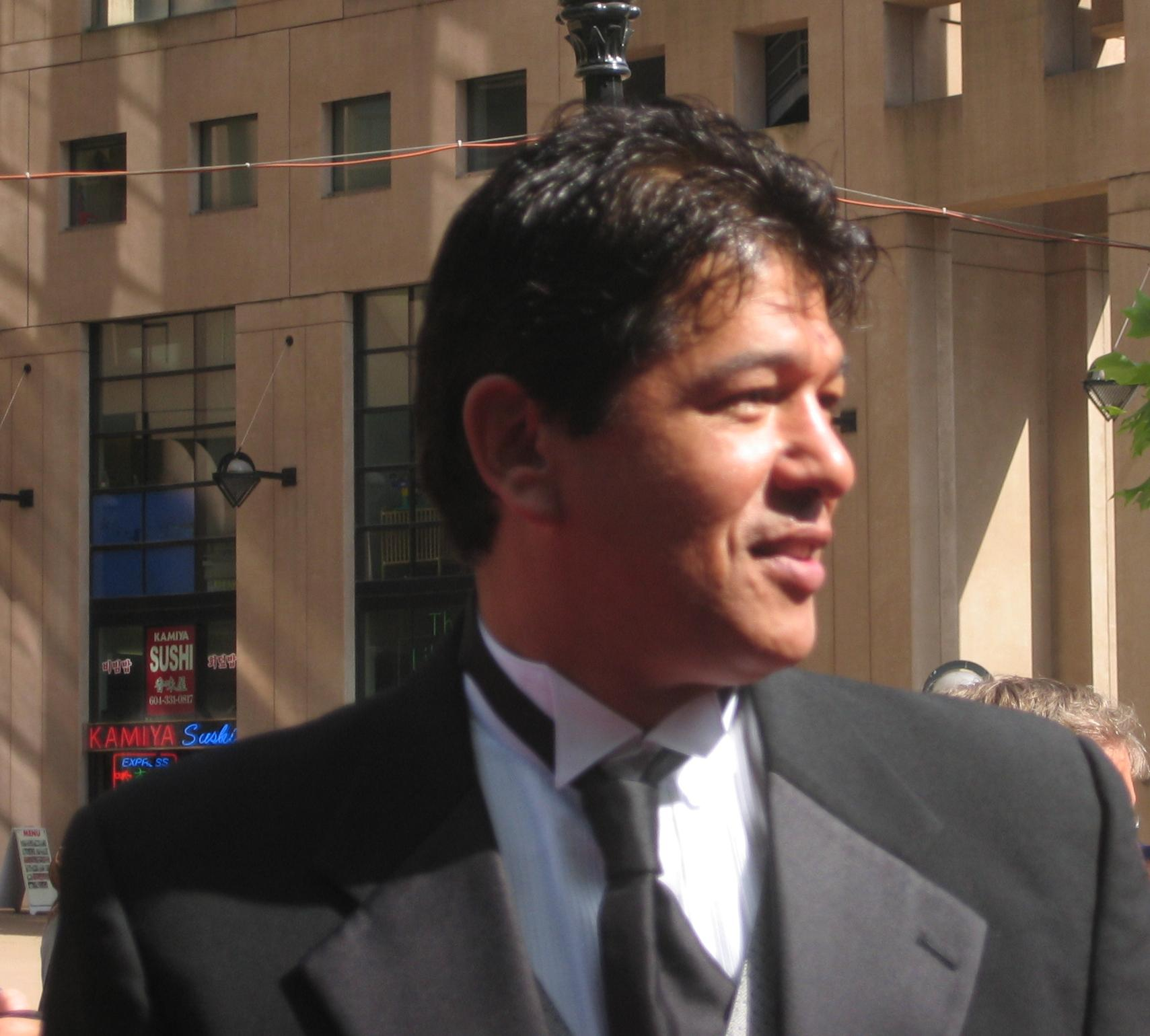
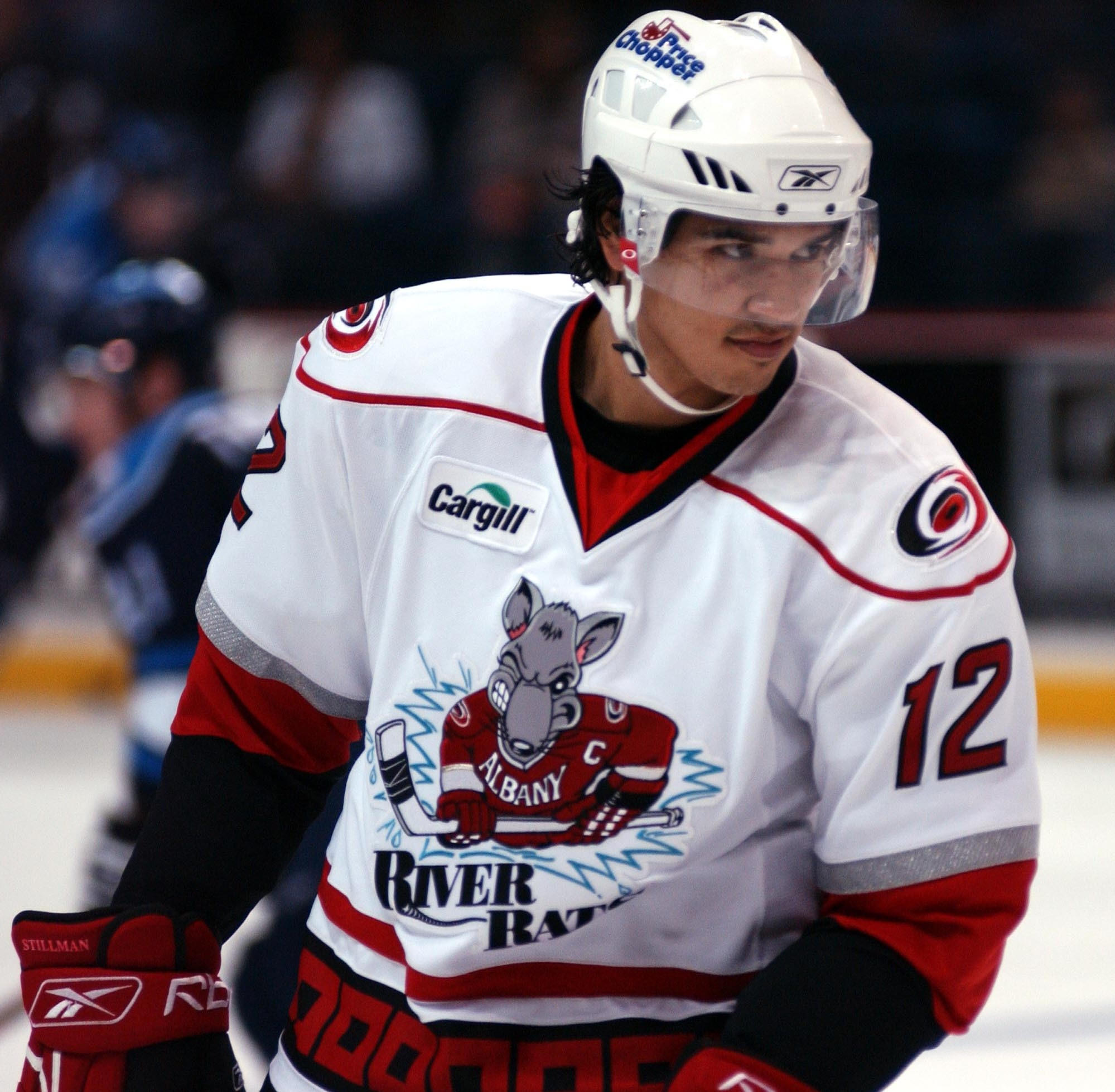
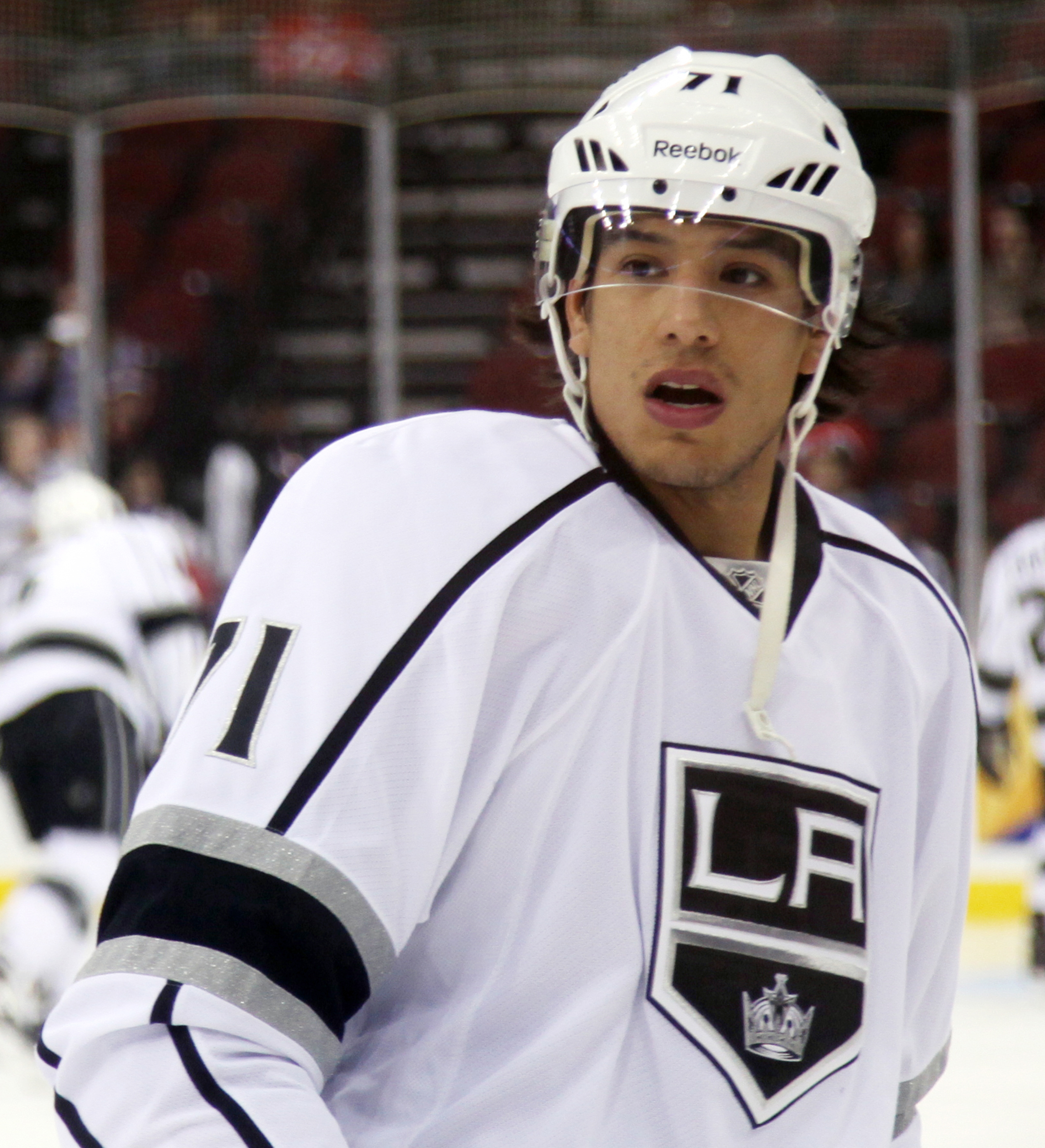
Top to bottom: Ted Nolan, Brandon Nolan and Jordan Nolan
- Taffy Abel, Ojibwe, first United States–born Native American player to become an NHL regular, which he did with the New York Rangers beginning on November 16, 1926
- George Armstrong, Ojibway, former NHL player for the Toronto Maple Leafs, four-time Stanley Cup champion, seven-time All-Star, and Hockey Hall of Fame member
- Aaron Asham, Métis, former NHL player for the Pittsburgh Penguins
- Ethan Bear, Ochapowace Nation, NHL player for the Vancouver Canucks
- Craig Berube, Cree, former NHL player and Stanley Cup winning head coach of the St. Louis Blues
- Jonathan Cheechoo, Cree, former NHL player for the San Jose Sharks and Ottawa Senators, one time Maurice "Rocket" Richard Trophy winner
- Michael Ferland, Cree, NHL player for the Vancouver Canucks
- Theoren Fleury, Métis, former NHL player for the Calgary Flames and 1989 Stanley Cup champion
- Brady Keeper, Pimicikamak Cross Lake First Nation, NHL player for the Vancouver Canucks
- Dwight King, Métis, former NHL player for the Los Angeles Kings and two-time Stanley Cup champion
- Brigette Lacquette, Métis, player for Team Canada
- Jocelyne Larocque, Cote First Nation, player for Team Canada and 2014 Olympic gold medalist
- Jamie Leach, Ojibwe, former NHL player for the Pittsburgh Penguins and 1992 Stanley Cup champion
- Reggie Leach, Ojibwe, former NHL player for the Philadelphia Flyers, 1975 Stanley Cup champion, and father of Jamie Leach
- Cayden Lindstrom, Driftpile First Nation, prospect for the Columbus Blue Jackets
- Brandon Montour, Mohawk, NHL player for the Florida Panthers
- Brandon Nolan, Ojibwe and Maliseet, former NHL player for the Carolina Hurricanes
- Jordan Nolan, Ojibwe and Maliseet, AHL player, two-time Stanley Cup winner with the Los Angeles Kings
- Ted Nolan, Ojibwe, former NHL player for the Detroit Red Wings and Pittsburgh Penguins, former head coach of the Buffalo Sabres and Latvia men's national ice hockey team at the 2014 Olympics; father of Jordan and Brandon
- Gino Odjick, Algonquin Kitigan Zibi, former NHL player for the Vancouver Canucks
- T. J. Oshie, Ojibwe, NHL player for the Washington Capitals, Stanley Cup winner and member of the 2014 men's US Olympic hockey team
- Carey Price, Ulkatcho First Nation, NHL goaltender for the Montreal Canadiens, Olympic Gold medalist for Canada and Vezina Trophy winner
- Wacey Rabbit, Blackfoot Confederacy, ECHL player
- Wade Redden, Métis, former NHL player for the Ottawa Senators
- Abby Roque, Wahnapitae First Nation, first indigenous person to play for the U.S. women’s Olympic hockey team, making her Olympic debut in Beijing 2022
- Chris Simon, Ojibwe, former NHL player with several teams and 1996 Stanley Cup champion
- Sheldon Souray, Métis, former NHL player for the Montreal Canadiens
- Jordin Tootoo, Inuit, former NHL player for the Nashville Predators, Detroit Red Wings, New Jersey Devils, and Chicago Blackhawks
- Bryan Trottier, Cree, former NHL player for the New York Islanders and Pittsburgh Penguins, seven-time Stanley Cup champion, nine-time All-Star, and Hockey Hall of Fame member
- Zach Whitecloud, Sioux Valley Dakota Nation, NHL player for the Vegas Golden Knights and 2023 Stanley Cup champion

== Basketball ==
- Ron Baker, Potawatomi. NBA and EuroLeague 2016-2020.
- MarJon Beauchamp, Mission and Luiseño. NBA and NBA G League player 2021-present.
- Ryneldi Becenti, Navajo. First Native American to play in the WNBA and first Native American woman to play professional basketball for a foreign nation.
- Joe Burton, Luiseño. Professional player in Europe 2013-present.
- Sandy Cohen III, Oneida. Israel professional player 2019-present.
- Gene Conley, Cherokee. NBA forward and 3x champion 1958-1964. Also an MLB pitcher.
- Sonny Dove, Wampanoag. NBA forward 1967-1978.
- Angel Goodrich, Cherokee. WNBA guard 2013-2015.
- Jason Kapono, Native Hawaiian. NBA forward 2003-2012. Champion.
- Gary Gray, Lenape. NBA guard 1967-1968.
- Natisha Hiedeman, Oneida. WNBA and other pro leagues 2019-present.
- Kyrie Irving, Lakota. NBA guard 2011-present. Champion and 9x All-Star.
- Phil Jordon, Wailaki and Nomlaki. NBA center 1956-1963. First Native American NBA player.
- Bronson Koenig, Ho-Chunk. NBA G League guard 2017-2020.
- Aaliyah Nye, Potowatomi. WNBA player 2025-present. Champion.
- Alissa Pili, Iñupiat. WNBA and WNBL player 2024-present.
- Tahnee Robinson, Northern Cheyenne, Pawnee, Shoshone, and Sioux. Became the first enrolled Native American woman in the WNBA in 2011.
- Shoni Schimmel, Confederated Tribes of the Umatilla Indian Reservation. WNBA guard 2014-2018. 2x All-Star.
- John Starks, Muscogee. NBA guard 1988-2002. All-Star.

== Boxing ==
- Kali Reis, three times world middleweight champion

== Cycling ==
- Neilson Powless, Oneida. Became the first Native North American to ride in the Tour de France in 2022. Won the 2021 Clásica de San Sebastián.
- Shayna Powless, Oneida. Mountain and road cyclist.

== Golf ==
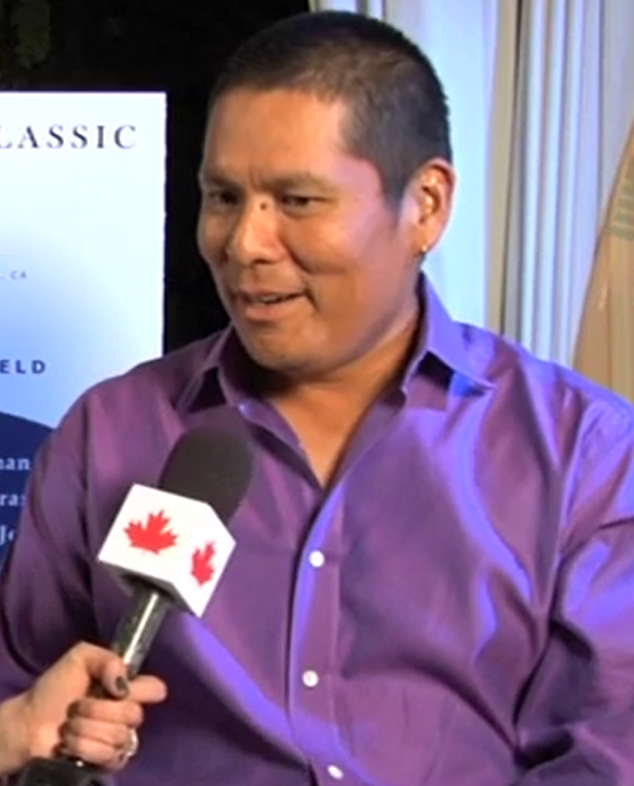
Notah Begay III in 2011

- Notah Begay III, Navajo, PGA Tour golfer
- Rod Curl, (Wintu), PGA Tour golfer
- Frank Dufina (Mackinac Bands of Chippewa and Ottawa Indians), professional golfer
- Rickie Fowler, Navajo, PGA Tour golfer

== Gymnastics ==
- Kanati Allen, Cherokee. Competed in artistic gymnastics at the 1968 Summer Olympics.
- Ciena Alipio, Navajo. Artistic gymnast for UCLA.
- Ashton Locklear, Lumbee. Artistic gymnast with a team gold medal at the 2014 World Championships.

== Ice skating ==
- Tai Babilonia, Hopi. Pairs figure skater. Won the 1979 World Championship.
- Mabel Fairbanks, Seminole. Figure skater and coach of professional skaters like Scott Hamilton and Kristi Yamaguchi.
- Naomi Lang, Karuk. Ice dancer. Became first Native American woman to compete in the Winter Olympic Games in 2002

== Mixed martial arts ==
- Max Holloway, Native Hawaiian. UFC Featherweight Champion.
- Nicco Montaño, Navajo and Chickasaw. First UFC Women's Flyweight Champion.
- Chance Rencountre, Osage. UFC fighter.

== Soccer ==
- Luke Brennan, Lenape. Became second Native American to play in an MLS game in 2023.
- Brian Ching, Native Hawaiian. MLS player 2001-2013. First Hawaiian drafted in the MLS and to play for the USMNT.
- Terry Felix, Sts'ailes. First Indigenous professional soccer player in North America, in the NASL, and first Indigenous player to represent Canada in 1983.
- Madison Hammond, Navajo and San Felipe Pueblo. Became the first Native American to play in the National Women's Soccer League in 2020.
- Natasha Kai, Native Hawaiian. NWSL player 2009-2019 and first Hawaiian to play for the USWNT.
- Lo'eau LaBonta, Native Hawaiian. NWSL player 2015-present and second Hawaiian to play for the USWNT.
- Harry Manson (Xul-si-malt), Snuneymuxw. One of the first Indigenous soccer players in the 19th century.
- Chris Wondolowski, Kiowa. Played as striker for San Jose Earthquakes and the United States national team. Became first Native American to play an MLS game in 2005.

== Swimming ==
- Apollo Hess, Kainai. Represented Canada at the 2024 Summer Olympics.
- Duke Kahanamoku, Native Hawaiian. Five-time Olympic gold and silver medalist, 1912-1924.
- Samuel Kahanamoku, Native Hawaiian. Bronze medalist at the 1924 Summer Olympics.
- Fred Kahele, Native Hawaiian. Competed at the 1920 Summer Olympics
- Thelma Kalama, Native Hawaiian. Relay gold medalist at the 1948 Summer Olympics.
- Maiola Kalili, Native Hawaiian. Relay silver medalist at the 1932 Summer Olympics.
- Manuella Kalili, Native Hawaiian. Relay silver medalist at the 1932 Summer Olympics.
- Pua Kealoha, Native Hawaiian. Gold and silver medalist at the 1920 Summer Olympics.
- Warren Kealoha, Native Hawaiian.
- Henry Luning, Native Hawaiian.
- Bill Smith, Native Hawaiian. Two-time gold medalist at the 1948 Summer Olympics.
- Bill Woosley, Native Hawaiian. Medalist at the 1952 and 1956 Summer Olympics.

== Table tennis ==
- Angelita Rosal, table tennis player and first woman inducted in the Indian Athletic Hall of Fame in 1973

== Professional wrestling ==
- Gerald Brisco, Chickasaw Nation pro wrestler and WWE talent scout
- Jack Brisco, Chickasaw Nation pro wrestler, former NWA World Champion
- Chris Chavis, Lumbee professional wrestler
- Mickie James, Powhatan-descent professional wrestler
- Edward "Wahoo" McDaniel, Choctaw-Chickasaw professional wrestler, former five-time NWA United States Heavyweight Champion
- Princess Victoria, professional wrestler,
- Nyla Rose, professional wrestler
- Fandango (wrestler), professional wrestler
