= Swimming at the 1932 Summer Olympics – Men's 100 metre freestyle =

Men's 100 metre freestyle at the Games of the X Olympiad
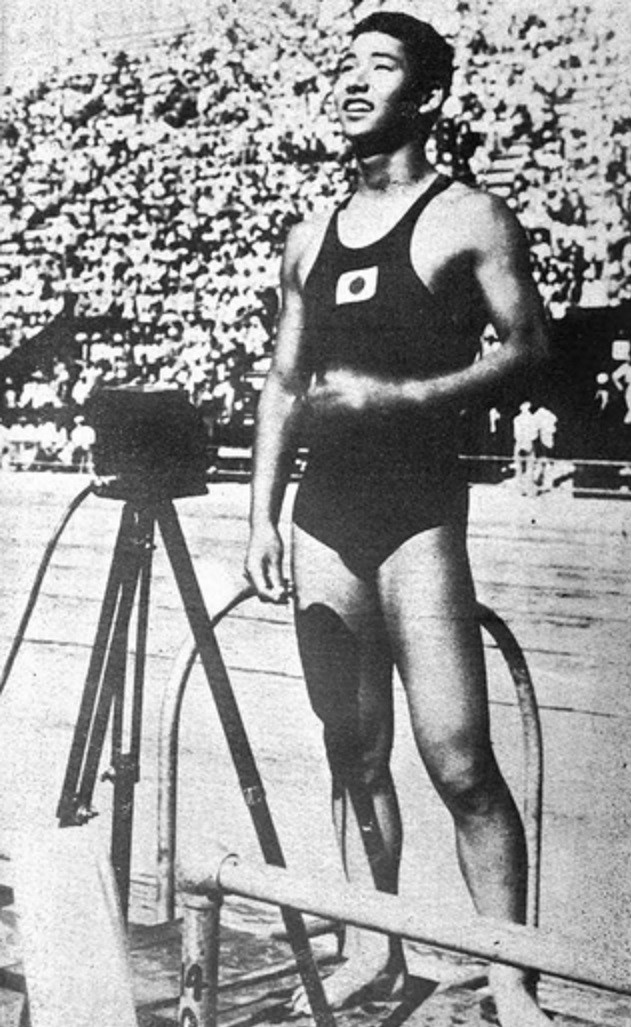
- Yasuji Miyazaki
- Venue: LA84 Foundation/John C. Argue Swim Stadium
- Dates: 6 August 1932 (heats & semifinals); 7 August 1932 (final)
- Competitors: 22 from 10 nations
- Winning time: 58.2

Medalists
1st place, gold medalist(s)		Yasuji Miyazaki; Japan
2nd place, silver medalist(s)		Tatsugo Kawaishi; Japan
3rd place, bronze medalist(s)		Albert Schwartz; United States

The men's 100 metre freestyle was a swimming event held as part of the swimming at the 1932 Summer Olympics programme. It was the eighth appearance of the event, which had not been featured only at the 1900 Games. The competition was held from Saturday August 6, 1932 to Sunday August 7, 1932. Twenty-two swimmers from ten nations competed. Nations had been limited to three swimmers each since the 1924 Games. The event was won by Yasuji Miyazaki of Japan, snapping a five-Games American win streak. Japan was only the third nation to win a gold medal in the event (Hungary had won the first two, the United States the next five). The final was entirely made up of Japanese and American swimmers, three each; Japan took the top two places as Tatsugo Kawaishi earned silver. The top American, Albert Schwartz, earned bronze. While the American win streak had ended at five, the nation's podium streak ran to seven Games.

== Background ==
This was the eighth appearance of the men's 100 metre freestyle. The event has been held at every Summer Olympics except 1900 (when the shortest freestyle was the 200 metres), though the 1904 version was measured in yards rather than metres.

Two of the seven finalists from 1928 returned: silver medalist István Bárány of Hungary and sixth-place finisher Walter Spence of Canada. Two-time gold medalist Johnny Weissmuller of the United States had retired to focus on his acting career; Tarzan the Ape Man was released earlier in 1932. The American swimming team remained strong. Japan, however, also had an impressive team, led by 15-year-old Yasuji Miyazaki.

The Philippines made its debut in the event. The United States made its eighth appearance, having competed at each edition of the event to date.

== Competition format ==
This freestyle swimming competition used a three-round (quarterfinals, semifinals, final) format. The advancement rule was a modification of the one used since 1912, allowing the top swimmers in each race plus one or more wild cards to advance. For this event, the top two in each preliminary heat plus the fastest third-place swimmer would advance to the semifinals; the top three in each semifinal would move on to the final. There were 4 heats of between 5 and 6 swimmers, allowing 9 swimmers to advance to the semifinals. The 2 semifinals had 4 or 5 swimmers each; 6 advanced to the final.

Each race involved two lengths of the 50-metre pool.

== Records ==
These were the standing world and Olympic records (in seconds) prior to the 1932 Summer Olympics.

World record	Johnny Weissmuller (USA)	57.4	Miami, United States	17 February 1924
Olympic record	Johnny Weissmuller (USA)	58.6	Amsterdam, Netherlands	11 August 1928

Saturday August 6, 1932: In the first semifinal Yasuji Miyazaki set a new Olympic record with 58.0 seconds.

== Schedule ==
Date	Time	Round
Saturday, 6 August 1932	9:00; 15:30	Heats; Semifinals
Sunday, 7 August 1932	15:30	Final

== Results ==
=== Heats ===
The fastest two in each heat and the fastest third-placed from across the heats advanced to the final.

==== Heat 1 ====
Rank	Swimmer	Nation	Time	Notes
1	Manuella Kalili	United States	59.6	Q
2	István Bárány	Hungary	1:00.4	Q
3	Munroe Bourne	Canada	1:01.1	
4	Reginald Sutton	Great Britain	1:02.9	
5	Leopoldo Tahier	Argentina	1:05.3	
6	Manoel Villar	Brazil	1:08.4	

==== Heat 2 ====
Rank	Swimmer	Nation	Time	Notes
1	Walter Spence	Canada	59.3	Q
2	Albert Schwartz	United States	59.6	Q
3	Tatsugo Kawaishi	Japan	59.8	q
4	András Wanié	Hungary	1:02.8	
5	Mostyn Ffrench-Williams	Great Britain	1:05.9	

==== Heat 3 ====
Rank	Swimmer	Nation	Time	Notes
1	Zenjiro Takahashi	Japan	59.5	Q
2	Raymond Thompson	United States	1:02.0	Q
3	Alfredo Rocca	Argentina	1:04.2	
4	Joseph Whiteside	Great Britain	1:04.7	
5	Eskil Lundahl	Sweden	1:06.2	
6	João Pereira	Brazil	1:08.2	

==== Heat 4 ====
Rank	Swimmer	Nation	Time	Notes
1	Yasuji Miyazaki	Japan	58.7	Q
2	András Székely	Hungary	1:01.5	Q
3	Abdurahman Ali	Philippines	1:02.2	
4	Noel Ryan	Australia	1:02.9	
5	Robert Halloran	Canada	1:06.9	

=== Semifinals ===
The fastest three in each semi-final advanced to the final.

==== Semifinal 1 ====
Rank	Swimmer	Nation	Time	Notes
1	Yasuji Miyazaki	Japan	58.0	Q, OR
2	Raymond Thompson	United States	59.3	Q
3	Manuella Kalili	United States	59.3	Q
4	István Bárány	Hungary	59.4	
5	András Székely	Hungary	1:01.4	

==== Semifinal 2 ====
Rank	Swimmer	Nation	Time	Notes
1	Tatsugo Kawaishi	Japan	59.0	Q
2	Albert Schwartz	United States	59.2	Q
3	Zenjiro Takahashi	Japan	59.5	Q
4	Walter Spence	Canada	59.6	

=== Final ===
Sunday August 7, 1932:

Rank	Swimmer	Nation	Time	Notes
1st place, gold medalist(s)	Yasuji Miyazaki	Japan	58.2	
2nd place, silver medalist(s)	Tatsugo Kawaishi	Japan	58.6	
3rd place, bronze medalist(s)	Albert Schwartz	United States	58.8	
4	Manuella Kalili	United States	59.2	
5	Zenjiro Takahashi	Japan	59.2	
6	Raymond Thompson	United States	59.5	
