= Tatsugo =

Tatsugo may refer to:

- Tatsugō, Kagoshima, town in Amami Ōshima, Japan
- Tatsugo Kawaishi (1911–1945), Japanese swimmer
