= Doraemon: Nobita's Chronicle of the Moon Exploration =

2019 film by Shinnosuke Yakuwa

Doraemon the Movie: Nobita's Chronicle of the Moon Exploration
- Theatrical release poster

Japanese name
- Kanji: 映画ドラえもん のび太の月面探査記
- Literal meaning: Doraemon: Nobita's Chronicle of the Moon Exploration
Transcriptions
- Revised Hepburn: Eiga Doraemon Nobita no Getsumen Tansa-ki
- Directed by: Shinnosuke Yakuwa
- Written by: Fujiko F. Fujio
- Screenplay by: Mizuki Tsujimura
- Based on: Doraemon by Fujiko F. Fujio
- Starring: Wasabi Mizuta; Megumi Ōhara; Yumi Kakazu; Subaru Kimura; Tomokazu Seki; Junko Minagawa; Alice Hirose; Sōichi Nakaoka; Shigeo Takahashi; Yūya Yagira; Kōtarō Yoshida
- Music by: Takayuki Hattori
- Production company: Shin-Ei Animation
- Distributed by: Toho
- Release date: March 1, 2019 (Japan)
- Running time: 111 minutes
- Country: Japan
- Language: Japanese
- Box office: $65.4 million

Doraemon: Nobita's Chronicle of the Moon Exploration (ドラえもん のび太の月面探査記, Doraemon: Nobita no Getsumen Tansa-ki) is an anime epic science fiction film directed by Shinnosuke Yakuwa and with a screenplay provided by Mizuki Tsujimura. It premiered in Japan on 1 March 2019.

The film later premiered in Hong Kong, Indonesia, Macau, Malaysia, Singapore, South Korea and Taiwan on 25 March 2020, and in India on 22 January 2023. It was the final Heisei-era Doraemon film, releasing two months before the 2019 Japanese imperial transition.

== Plot ==
One morning, Nobita learns about the mysterious happenings on the Moon and tells his classmates that it was the Moon Rabbits, but nobody believes him. He tries to prove it by imitating the rabbits making rice cakes, but ends up hitting his teacher in the face and is punished to go stand outside the classroom in the school hallway, where Nobita cries out Doraemon's name. When Nobita returns home, he tells Doraemon about what had happened at school, to which Doraemon reluctantly pulls out the "Divergent View Badge" gadget and creates an atmosphere on the Moon. Using the animal clay, they create Moonbit rabbits and return home. Later, Nobita's mother tells him to bring Susuki grass for the Moon Viewing Ceremony, where he ends up seeing a boy and calls out for him, but the boy ends up suddenly disappearing. The next day, a new student named Luca arrives, and Nobita is surprised that it is the same boy he had seen yesterday.

When Nobita is home again, he asks Doraemon to take him back to the Kingdom. Upon reaching there, they find the bamboo plants glowing, which was the effect of the "Shining Moss" they had spread earlier. Nobita heads to the playground to see his close friends Shizuka, Gian, and Suneo, where he gives them each a badge and invites them to go with him to the Kingdom. Luca comes by and joins them, and Nobita gives them all a grand welcome to the rabbit kingdom. They meet a rabbit resembling Nobita and named it Nobit, teasing Nobita. Shizuka requests Nobit to give them a good tour of the place, which he accepts. Doraemon reveals that they can see this kingdom because of the badges they are wearing and warns not to remove it as it allows them to breathe. A huge rabbit monster (who was created by Nobita earlier while he and Doraemon were creatinf the Moonbit) arrives within a seconds and starts to wreak havoc.

Nobita chases after the rabbit monster and ends up falling into a deep abyss without the badge. The others arrive and Nobit, who saw everything, tells them that Nobita had fallen. Doraemon gets worried about Nobita but hears Nobita's voice from below, and the group discovers that Nobita is safe. They all soon learn that Luca is not an Earthling but an Espal from the planet Kaguya with special powers known as Ether. Luca introduces Nobita and friends to his sister Luna, but suddenly, they all hear a loud noise. They discover it was his little brother Al's song. Luca informs everyone that Al's power is different from the other Espal's and that Al is able to see the future. The group decide to hold a Space Kart Race on the Moon's surface. Gian, Suneo, and Al are in the lead. When their cart is about to crash into a huge rock, Al uses its power to destroy it.

The others arrive there, and Luca reveals that they are trying to hide from the people of Kaguya planet and that Diabolo had previously used the Ether power to destroy the Moon of the Kaguya planet to show off his power. Still, the particles of the Moon covered the whole Kaguya Planet, and it had become a dark planet. Due to this, his parents used a ship to send all the Espal to space to avoid being taken advantage of doing disastrous things again. Suddenly, an unknown raid force arrives and tries to capture Espal, where the other Espal also comes out from hiding and to the surface to enquire about the explosion. The Kaguya beings use "Ether Distortion" to weaken the Espal. The Kaguya beings captured all of Espal except Luca, while Doraemon tells everyone to run towards the "Anywhere Door" in order to escape, but Luca stays behind and ends up kidnapped.

The Anywhere Door explodes due to the Kaguya beings' attack. Nobita begs Doraemon to use the "Bamboo Copter" to fly to the Moon, but Doraemon denies. Mozo, the Kaguya turtle, suddenly pops out from inside Shizuka's shirt and tells Nobita and the group to use the emergency ship he and Luca had used to head to Earth. Doraemon orders everyone to meet and gather at the field 7 pm. At 7 pm, the group fly to the Moon. Upon reaching there, they find Moonbit, who is trying to say something; they follow him and see Luna, who reveals that Luca had given his badge to her, which was how she managed to escape. Nobita, Doraemon, Suneo, Mozo, and Gian leave for Kaguya, with Doraemon giving Shizuka his spare pocket and the "Danger Alarm".

Meanwhile, Commander Godat takes Luca to Diabolo, who reveals his plans to leave Kaguya and attack Earth. Later, Godat frees Luca from the handcuffs and is filled with rage knowing that he was used. The royal servants arrive and arrest Godat and Luca. Upon arriving there, the friends decide to ask the residents of the planet about the Espal. The residents reveal that they do not know anything about them, but all the essential people on the planet live in the Royal Palace. The gang enters the palace and starts searching for Luca and his friends. In the prison, Godat reveals to Luca that he is the descendant of Dr. Godal (who created Espal) and gives him a blue orb, which he had inherited from his ancestors, which Luca kept in his pocket The gang arrives there and frees the Espal. Luca tells Nobita and friends that Godat is their ally.

Gian and Suneo handle the royal soldiers while Godat, Luca, Nobita, and Doraemon head over to fight Diabolo, whose true form is revealed to be a robot. Diabolo attacks the four and knocks them all unconscious while Gian and Suneo are also captured. On the Moon, Shizuka sees Nobit working on something, and she starts thinking that as soon as she removes the badge, Nobit and all of the Rabbit Kingdom will vanish. She removes it and is shocked to still be able to see Nobit, which is because of the Reality Badge that Nobit had made. Doraemon, Nobita, and the others all wake up to find themselves trapped in a cage. Diabolo tells them that he intends to use the Ether to become young again, which he uses and becomes a bit younger again. Nobita provokes Doraemon to pull out a gadget, but Doraemon tells him that his pocket is missing, as Diabolo had taken away his pocket while he was unconscious. Suddenly, Shizuka, Luna, and the Moonbit pop out of Doraemon's pocket and free the Espal, then telling Doraemon and the others that it was due to Nobit's badge. Diabolo is about to be destroyed, but he manages to capture Luna and escape, declaring that he will head to Earth and destroy it. Mozo informs everyone that his shell is the hardest in the universe and they put it in the Air Cannon. Luca gives a Power Boost to Nobita, and Mozo goes straight through the ship, destroying it completely, with Suneo catching Luna in his arms and saving her from falling. Suddenly, the blue orb starts shining and the light of the planet is restored. Doraemon investigates the orb and tells them that it is a kind of Shining Moss that was made to multiply and explode when in contact with Ether.

Nobita says that Luca's ancestors knew that he would come back and restore the light of the planet. Godat requests Luca to stay with him, but he refuses, saying it would be better that Espal remains a myth. Back on the Moon, Luca requests Doraemon to create a theory that Espal are just normal beings and the rabbit ears vanish off, where they become normal beings. Doraemon and their friends return to Earth, where they bury each of their badges in order to ensure a peaceful life for the Espal.

== Soundtrack ==
The theme song is "THE GIFT" by Dai Hirai.

A separate soundtrack was released on February 27, 2019, with music composed by Takayuki Hattori.

== Cast ==
Character	Japanese voice actor
Doraemon	Wasabi Mizuta
Nobita Nobi	Megumi Ōhara
Shizuka Minamoto	Yumi Kakazu
Suneo Honekawa	Tomokazu Seki
Takeshi "Gian" Gōda	Subaru Kimura
Luca	Junko Minagawa
Luna	Alice Hirose
Dr. Godal	Yūya Yagira
Dr. Godal's Wife	Akeno Watanabe
Cancer	Sōichi Nakaoka, Shigeo Takahashi
Crab	Shigeo Takahashi
Goddard	Yūya Yagira
Diabolo	Kōtarō Yoshida
Moobit	Akeno Watanabe
Tamako Nobi	Kotono Mitsuishi
Nobisuke Nobi	Yasunori Matsumoto
Hidetoshi Dekisugi	Shihoko Hagino
Teacher	Wataru Takagi
Yasuo	Yuka Keicho
Haruo	Asami Yaguchi
Aru	Ikue Ōtani
Mozo	Yukiji
Kaia	Ai Sakai
Nuru	Michiyo Murase
Moru	Nobuaki Kanemitsu
Rukoru	Hitomi Nabatame
Horuru	
Runi	
Tsukkuru	
Beru	

== Box office ==
Debuting on 383 screens with Toho distributing, Doraemon the Movie: Nobita's Chronicle of the Moon Exploration earned $6.2 million on 586,000 admissions in its first weekend and ranked number-one on Japanese box office. The film has grossed ¥5.02 billion ($31,708,734) in Japan, and $19,855,318 in China and Vietnam, for a total box office of $51,248,228 in Asia.

The film was released in Hong Kong, Indonesia, Macau, Malaysia, Singapore, South Korea and Taiwan on 5 February 2019 marking Chinese New Year and in Japan on 1 March 2019.

Here is a table which shows the box office of this movie of all the weekends in Japan:

#	Rank	Weekend	Weekend gross	Total gross till current weekend
1	1	March 2–3	¥695,700,000 ($6.2 million)	¥757,437,800 ($6.8 million)
2	1	March 9–10	¥612,046,700 ($5.5 million)	¥1,491,610,300 ($13.5 million)
3	1	March 16–17	¥437,689,000 ($3.9 million)	¥2,057,055,800 ($18.6 million)
4	1	March 23–24	¥310,745,700 ($2.8 million)	¥2,866,733,800 ($26.0 million)
5	1	March 30–31	¥323,763,200 ($2.9 million)	¥3,826,872,100 ($34.8 million)
6	1	April 6–7	¥174,742,000 ($1.6 million)	¥4,532,025,400 ($41.0 million)
7	2	April 13–14	¥97,795,500 ($873,000)	¥4,684,036,700 ($42.4 million)
8	8	April 20–21	¥41,445,900 ($370,000)	¥4,739,882,100 ($43.0 million)
9	9	April 27–28	¥27,000,000 ($250,000)	¥4,768,000,000 ($43.4 million)
10	10	May 4–5	¥27,888,400 ($252,000)	¥4,945,496,100 ($44.9 million)
11	-	May 11–12	¥7,000,000 ($64,000)	¥4,960,000,000 ($45.0 million)
FINAL TOTAL	-	-	-	¥5,020,000,000 ($45.6 million)

== See also ==
- List of Doraemon films
