= Frank Booth (swimmer) =

American swimmer (1910–1980)

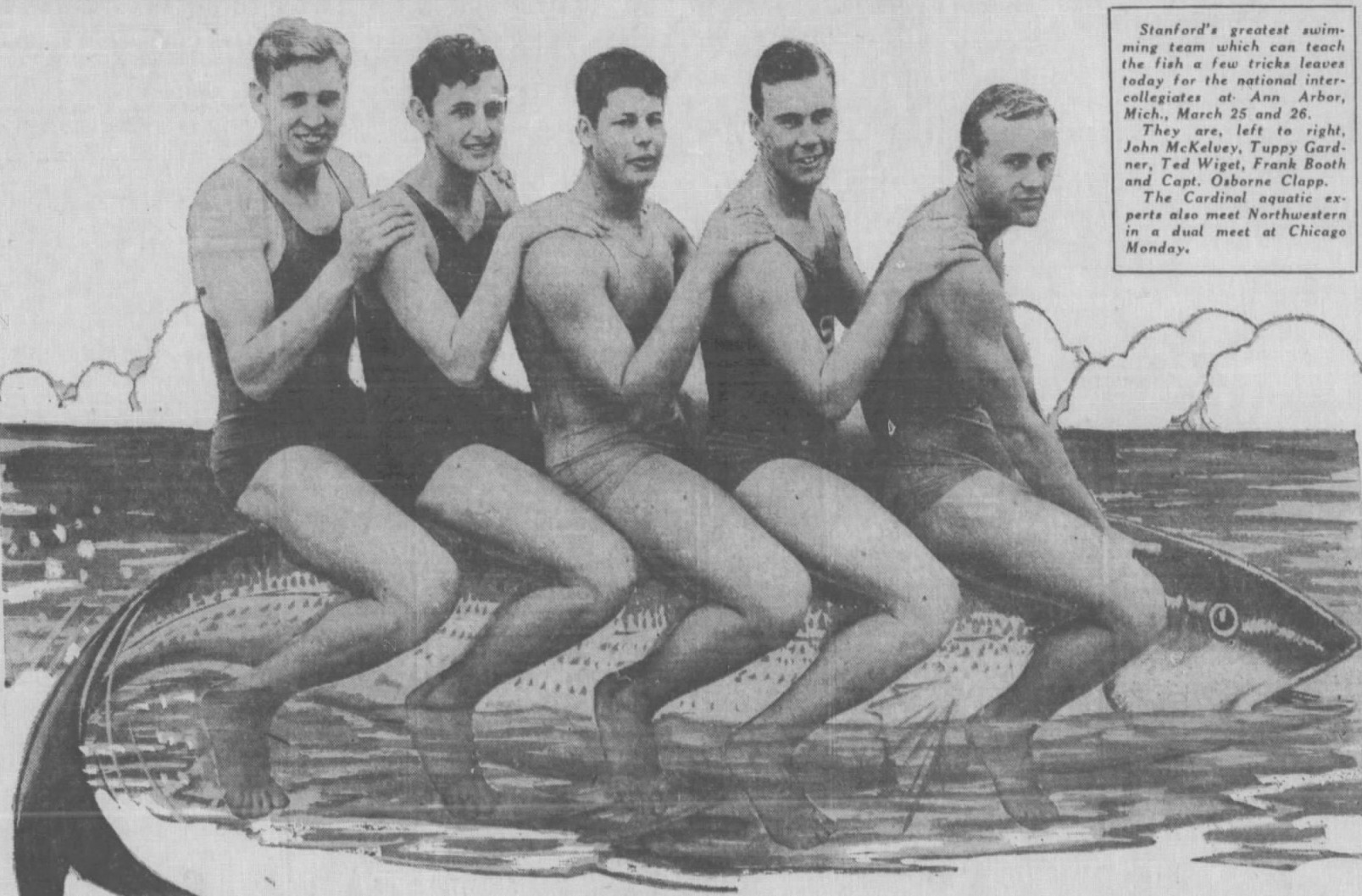
- The 1932 Stanford Swimming Team, left to right, John McKelvey, Tuppy Gardner, Ted Wiget, Frank Booth and Osborne Clapp.

Personal information
- Full name: Frank Ewen Booth
- National team: United States
- Born: October 4, 1910 Los Angeles, California, U.S.
- Died: December 1, 1980 (aged 70) Newport Beach, California, U.S.
- Spouse: Arleen

Sport
- Sport: Swimming
- Strokes: Freestyle
- Club: Hollywood Athletic Club; Los Angeles Athletic Club
- College team: Stanford University
- Coach: Ernst Brandsten (Stanford)
Medal record
Men's swimming
Representing the United States
Olympic Games
Silver medal – second place	1932 Los Angeles	4x200 m freestyle

Frank Ewen Booth (October 4, 1910 – December 1, 1980) was an American competition swimmer who represented the United States at the 1932 Summer Olympics in Los Angeles, California.

== Swimming career ==
Booth learned to swim at the Hollywood Athletic Club where he swam on a team that won the AAU relay in freestyle in both 1929 and 1931. He represented the Los Angeles Allied Athletic Club at the 1932 Olympic trials in Cincinnati. The Hollywood Athletic Club, at times was considered a branch of the Los Angeles Allied Athletic Club, particularly at Olympic trial competition.

=== Stanford University ===
He attended Stanford University, where he was managed by Hall of Fame Head Coach Ernst Brandsten, who coached at Stanford from 1916 to 1947. Brandsten was a 1912 Olympian for Sweden in Diving, and an Olympic Diving coach for the United States in 1920, 1924, and 1928. In May, 1931 Booth was unanimously elected to lead the Stanford Swimming Team as captain, replacing Austin Clapp, a 1928 and 1932 Olympic medalist. Booth, of the class of 1932, was a major contributor in points to the Stanford team that year.

On February 27, 1931, he competed with the Olympic Club of San Francisco's Water Polo Team in the Pacific Coast Championship series in a competition against the highly competitive Los Angeles Athletic Club Water Polo Team, known as the "Mercurys", several of whose members had represented the United States in Olympic water polo competition. Booth's Olympic Club team included former Stanford University swimming team Captain Austin Clapp.

At a Stanford Water Carnival Meet on May 2, 1931, at the Stanford Women's Pool, Booth won the 100-yard freestyle, and was on a team that won the 100-yard mixed relay. On April 7, 1929, Booth won the 500-yard freestyle and was on a team that won the 225 yard medley at the Junior Pacific Association Championship, leading Stanford to win the meet.

=== 1932 Olympic silver medal ===
At the 1932 U.S. Olympic Trials, Booth, swam for the Los Angeles Allied Athletic Club at Coney Island Park Pool in Cincinnati, Ohio, in mid-July 1932, where he qualified for the 800-meter freestyle relay. He qualified for the U.S. team for the 1932 Summer Olympics in both the 400 and 800-meter freestyles, but did not swim in those events.

At the 1932 Summer Olympics, on August 9, 1932, Booth won a silver medal as a member of the second-place U.S. team in the men's 4×200-meter freestyle relay, with fellow Americans George Fissler, and Hawaiians Maiola Kalili and his brother Manuella Kalili. The U.S. 4x200-meter team swam a 9:10.5, and broke the world record, but the winning Japanese team had broken the world record as well and finished 12 seconds earlier. Despite the Olympic swimming competition taking place at America's Los Angeles Memorial Coliseum, the Japanese swimming team won 12 medals, two more than the American team.

== Later life ==
In 1970, though not a resident Hawaiian, Booth became a member of the Outrigger Canoe Club, and when in Hawaii enjoyed meeting with other Olympic swimmers, as two were on his 1932 Olympic gold medal-winning 4x200 relay team. He continued swimming throughout his life, competing with the All American Masters Swimming Team as late as 1976. In his professional life he was a businessman, the CEO of Interstate Engineering, a diverse electronic manufacturing company, founded in 1956, that by 1962 made products ranging from vacuum cleaners to missile instrumentation, and produced undercarriage parts for trailers. He worked twenty years, primarily in business management roles for Interstate. He also worked for several other California corporations. Later in life, he was active in land development in Rancho California and Arizona. While living in Laguna beach, he ran an avocado farm, an education consultancy and a finance company.

He died at the age of 70, in Newport Beach, California. He was survived by his wife, Arleen, and two daughters.

== See also ==
- List of Olympic medalists in swimming (men)
- Swimming at the 1932 Summer Olympics
