= Ellison Brown =

Native American runner and Olympian

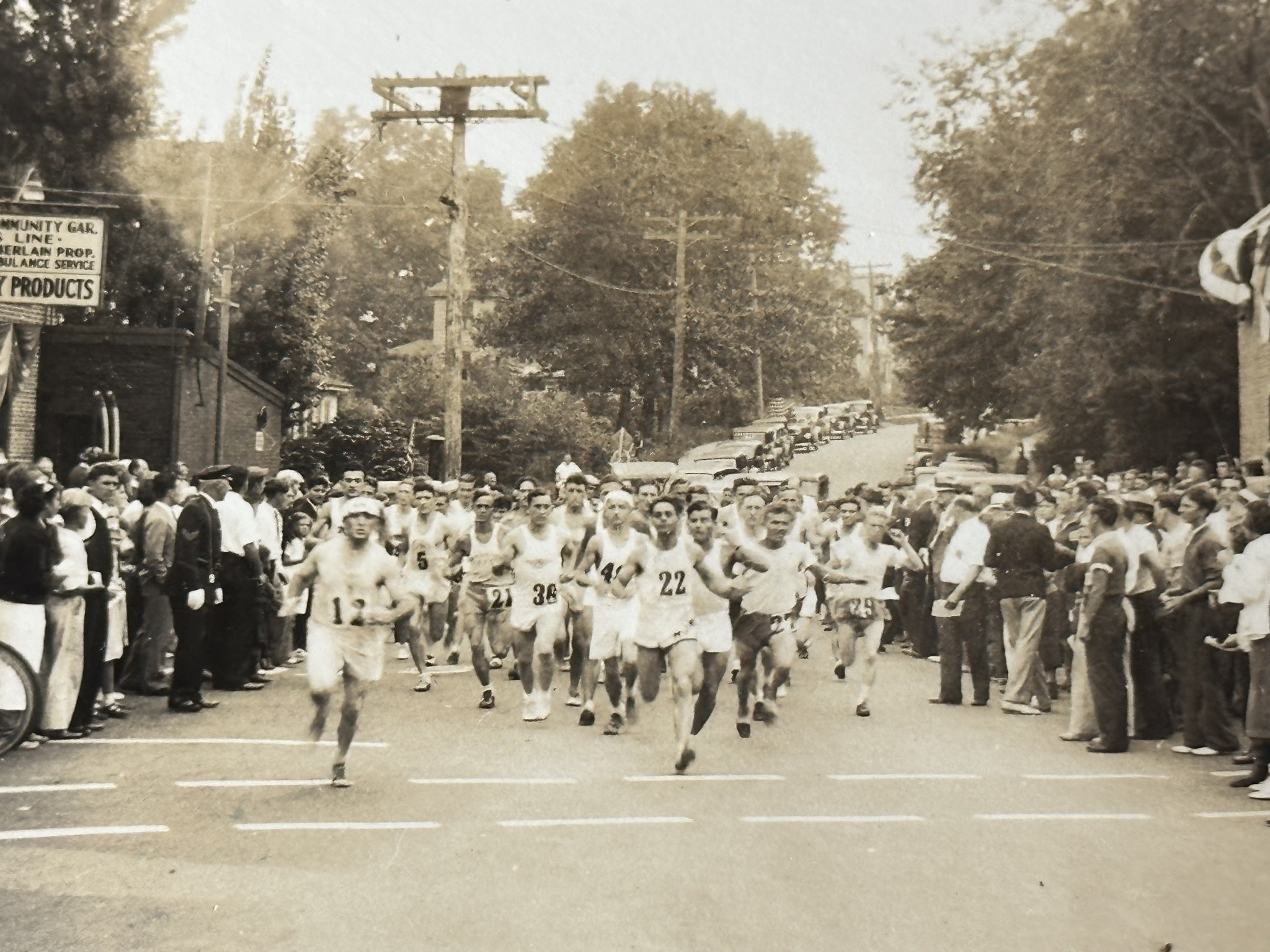
- The start of a 1936 road race in Oakdale Square, Dedham, Massachusetts. Brown wears bib number 22.
- Born: September 22, 1913; Westerly, Rhode Island, U.S.
- Died: August 23, 1975 (aged 61); Westerly, Rhode Island, U.S.
- Other names: Tarzan Brown, Deerfoot
- Citizenship: Narragansett Indian Tribe and U.S.
- Education: Tomaquag School
- Occupations: Marathoner, mason, fisherman
- Known for: Winning the Boston Marathon twice

Ellison Myers Brown (September 22, 1913 – August 23, 1975), widely known as Tarzan Brown, was a Native American long-distance runner, best known as a two-time winner of the Boston Marathon, in 1936 and 1939. Brown ran the marathon in the 1936 Summer Olympics in Berlin; he also qualified for the 1940 Summer Olympics, ultimately canceled due to the outbreak of World War II.

A direct descendant of the last acknowledged royal family of the Narragansett Indian Tribe of Rhode Island, Brown was also known as Deerfoot amongst his people. He is one of two Indigenous runners to have won the Boston Marathon; the other was Thomas Longboat, an Onondaga runner from the Six Nations of the Grand River in Canada, who won the 1907 edition. Brown is the only Indigenous person to have won the Boston Marathon twice. He was inducted into the American Indian Athletic Hall of Fame in 1973.

Brown set the American men's record for the marathon at the 1939 Boston Marathon (2:28:51) and at the 1940 marathon in Salisbury Beach, Massachusetts (2:27:30).

== Early life and education ==
Brown was born on September 22, 1913, in the Potter Hill section of Westerly, Rhode Island, to Narragansett parents Byron Otis Brown (1879–1943) and Grace Ethel (Babcock) Brown (1882–1935). Brown had three sisters: Myra, Alice aka "Nina," and Grace; and three brothers: Franklin, Elwin and Clifford.

Brown received minimal formal education. He studied at the Tomaquag School in Alton for three years but left school by the seventh grade.

He was nicknamed "Tarzan" as a boy. He was athletic, strong, and loved being outdoors. He climbed trees and could swing from one branch to another, reminding those around him of Edgar Rice Burroughs‘s famous fictional hero.

== Athletic training ==
Brown was first noticed for his running talent when he was 12 years old. As Native American runner Horatio "Chief" Stanton was training for an upcoming race, his trainer Thomas "Tippy" Salimeno, Sr. watched as the boy ran, following after Stanton and trying to keep pace.

Salimeno took the young athlete under his wing when Brown turned 16 and began to train him, his first official steps to an illustrious career in marathon running that eventually saw Brown win the Boston Marathon in both 1936 and 1939 and become a member of the 1936 U.S. Olympic team. Salimeno once said, "Tarzan ran against people, not against numbers. He probably could have broke other records, but I never pushed him. When you're in a race you don't go out for records, you go out to win."

== Career ==
=== Heartbreak Hill and 1936 Boston Marathon victory ===
Heartbreak Hill, an ascent over 0.4-mile (600 m) between the 20- and 21-mile (32 and 34 km) marks of the Boston Marathon, near Boston College, is the last of four "Newton Hills." These begin at the 16-mile (26 km) mark and challenge contestants with late climbs after the course's general downhill trend to that point. Though Heartbreak Hill itself rises only 88 feet (27 m) vertically (from an elevation of 148 to 236 feet (45 to 72 m)), it comes at a point in the marathon distance where muscular glycogen stores are most likely to be depleted—a phenomenon referred to by marathoners as "hitting the wall."

Brown had taken off so fast at the start of the 1936 Boston Marathon that the press followed the second runner John A. Kelley until the 20-mile mark, and it was on this hill that Kelley caught up to Brown. As Kelley overtook Brown, an amazing feat given the steady record-breaking pace Brown had set, Kelley patted Brown on the back. What followed was a struggle between Brown, who took the lead on the downhills, and Kelley, who took the lead on the uphills, until Brown finally took the lead again to win the race and Kelley faded to a fifth-place finish. This struggle inspired reporter Jerry Nason to name the last Newton hill "Heartbreak Hill" because Brown "broke Kelley's heart" there.

=== 1936 Olympic Games and iron man stunt ===
Brown was selected to compete on the U.S. Olympic team for the 1936 Olympic Games in Nazi Germany, and was a teammate of the legendary track and field star Jesse Owens.

There are various stories of what occurred while Brown was in Germany for the 1936 Olympics. It is known that for more than half of the Olympic marathon, Brown was in the top five when an issue with leg cramps arose. As Tarzan stopped to try and tend to his leg cramps, a woman identified as a nurse came out of the crowd to assist Tarzan with working through the cramps when Olympic officials disqualified Tarzan. The media was harsh towards Brown upon his return to the United States.

Later in 1936, Brown won the venerable Port Chester, NY marathon in 2:36:56.7 The next day, October 12, he won a second marathon, the New England Marathon Championship in Manchester, New Hampshire, in 2:45:52, which he later said was to prove to critics and detractors that he had not quit in the Berlin Olympics earlier that summer.

=== 1939 Boston Marathon victory ===
In 1939, Brown was the first runner to break the 2:30 mark on the post-1926 Boston course. According to official data from the Boston Athletic Association, many runners prior to 1926 finished the Boston Marathon in times under 2:30 (see List of winners of the Boston Marathon). Those runners competed on courses known to be shorter than the IAAF-defined marathon distance of 42.195 kilometers. After the 17-mile mark in the 1939 race, Brown also broke every checkpoint record. He would later qualify for the 1940 U.S. Olympic team but the games were canceled due to World War II's outbreak in Europe.

=== Other notable moments in the Boston Marathon ===
In one of his earliest appearances as a runner in the 1935 race, Brown arrived in an outfit sewn together from one of his mother's old dresses by his sisters and worn sneakers that were falling apart. It was just two days after his mother had died.

Approximately 21 miles into the race, Brown removed his sneakers, threw them into the crowd and ran the rest of the race (approximately five miles) barefoot, finishing thirteenth.

By 1938, Brown had gained significant popularity among spectators for his distinct and unconventional running style. In the 1938 Boston Marathon, Brown was leading on a warm day when midway through the race, he ran off the road, waved to the crowd and jumped into Lake Cochituate to swim and cool off. He returned to and ran the rest of the course, though other runners had long passed by. Most notably, fellow Rhode Islander Les Pawson (of Pawtucket, Rhode Island) won that year. Pawson was one of Brown's top rivals and friends.

Brown was also seen arriving shortly before the start of the 1939 Boston Marathon eating hot dogs and drinking milkshakes just before the race; he claimed that he had missed breakfast. Incidents like these led members of the media to write harshly about Brown. Most sports writers of the time period when Brown first started running competitively would use racist language, such as describing him as a "penniless redskin who would rather fish than work."

== Personal life ==
In addition to running, Brown worked as a stonemason and shellfish fisherman. He married a Narragansett woman named Ethel Wilcox (April 23, 1919–October 14, 2015), and had four children: Ellison Jr aka Sunny, Norman, Marlene and Ethel. He usually sold the medals and trophies he won while racing in order to support his family. Tom Derderian wrote, “The economy in these depression times provided little for most Americans and nothing for Indians. They were a conquered people living on the margin...Ellison Myers Brown, born on the margin, saw running as his only way out of poverty."

== Death and legacy ==
Many varied accounts of the events on the evening of August 23, 1975, which led to Brown's death, have been told. Some state that he was in the wrong place at the wrong time, waiting for a ride home, or that an altercation may have been taking place. However, amidst whatever confusion and circumstances there may have been, he was killed when a van hit him outside a Westerly bar. Brown's injuries proved to be fatal.

There is an annual Mystic River road race named in his honor in Mystic, Connecticut, every fall as part of a conference commemorating past Native American runners of the Boston Marathon and to acknowledge the history and significance of running in many Indigenous American cultures. At the 2016 Boston Marathon race, Narragansett tribal member Mikki Wosencroft ran and completed the Boston course as an acknowledged representative of Brown's family and the Narragansett tribe to honor him and his legacy.

A life-size bronze statue of Brown—5 feet 7 inches (1.70 m) tall and weighing 280 pounds (130 kg)—commissioned by a non-profit organization, was first unveiled in Westerly on January 2, 2026, at an indoor location, due to be moved in the spring of 2026 to Rooney Park near downtown Westerly.

== See also ==
- List of winners of the Boston Marathon
- Narragansett people
- Native Americans in the United States
