= Raymond Thompson (swimmer) =

American Olympic swimmer (1911-1999)

Personal information
- Full name: Raymond Webb Thompson, Jr.
- National team: United States
- Born: March 12, 1911 Bethesda, Maryland, U.S.
- Died: February 14, 1999 (aged 87)

Sport
- Sport: Swimming
- Strokes: Freestyle
- College team: U.S. Naval Academy

Raymond Webb Thompson, Jr. (March 12, 1911 – February 14, 1999) was an American competition swimmer who represented the United States at the 1932 Summer Olympics in Los Angeles, California. Thompson placed sixth in the men's 100-meter freestyle, recording a time of 59.5 seconds in the final.

== See also ==
- List of United States Naval Academy alumni
