= Wawashkamo Golf Club =

- U.S. National Historic Landmark District – Contributing property
- Michigan State Historic Site
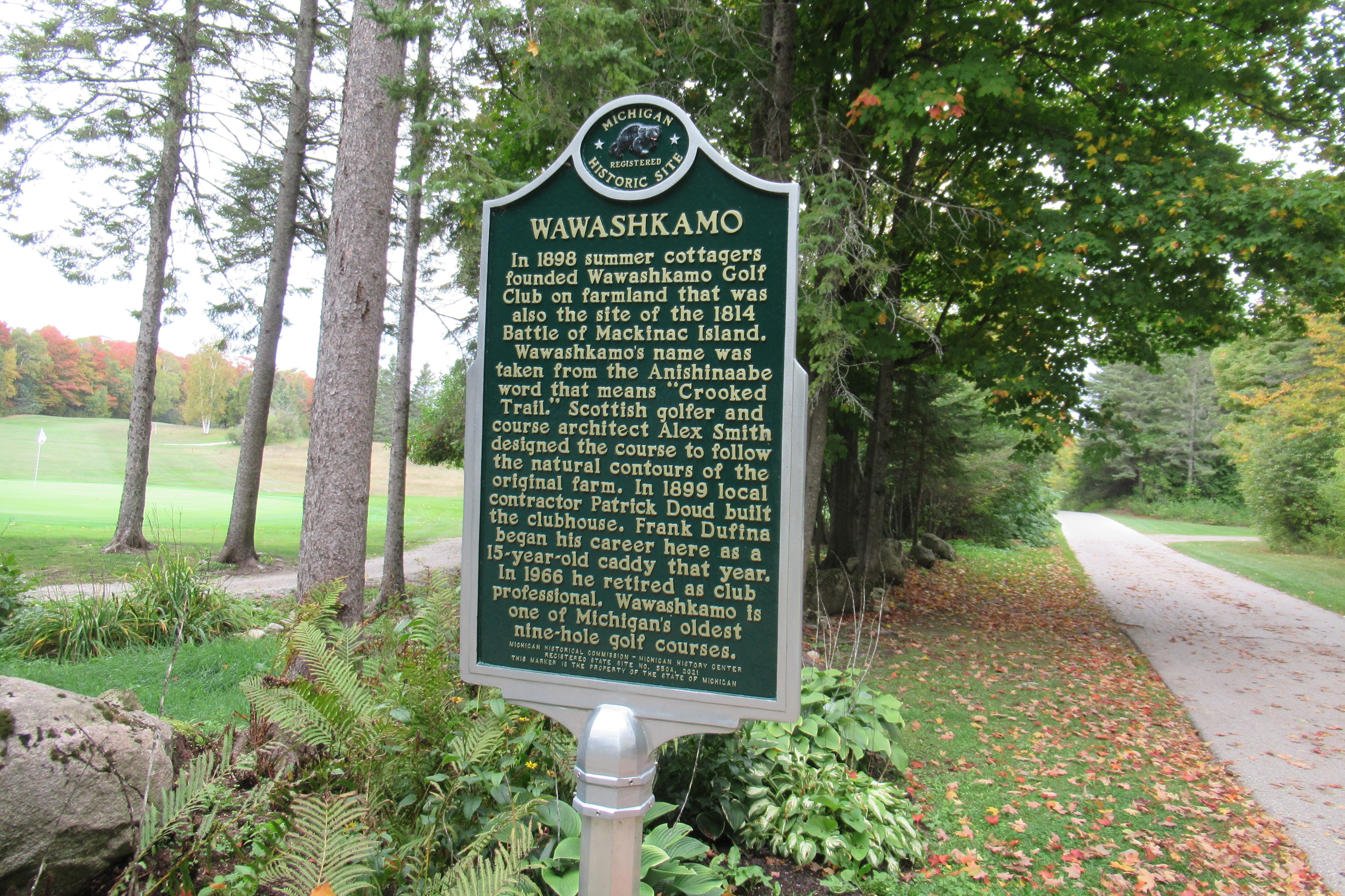
- Michigan state historic marker

- Location within Michigan Location within the United States
- Location: 1 British Landing Road; Mackinac Island, Michigan
- Coordinates: 45°52′04″N 84°37′51″W
- Part of: Mackinac Island (ID66000397)

Significant dates
- Designated NHLDCP: October 15, 1966
- Designated MSHS: September 8, 1982

The Wawashkamo Golf Club is a nine-hole links golf course on Mackinac Island in the U.S. state of Michigan. The course was laid out by Alex Smith in 1898. The golf course retains many of the features of a nineteenth-century golf links, including a relatively treeless layout, comparatively short holes, and very long rough. Smith, a native Scotsman from Carnoustie, was familiar with the links courses of his boyhood home.

Wawashkamo was laid out on a farmer's field that had been the site of the 1814 Battle of Mackinac Island. Separate historical markers commemorate both the golf links and the battlefield. The name of the club and course comes from the Chippewa word waawaashkaamon for the act of 'walking a crooked trail'.

Longtime club pro Frank Dufina is believed to have had the longest tie between a course and a professional in U.S. golfing history. It spanned 70 years, from 1898 to 1968.

Wawashkamo was honored as one of "America's Historic Golf Landmarks" by Golf Digest in 1996. The course is contained within Mackinac Island State Park.

Club Officers: Peter M. Pellerito, President; Gaspare Calandrino, Vice President; Richard Riel, Treasurer; Kelly Rayment, Secretary
