= Benevenuto Nunes =

Brazilian swimmer

Benevenuto Nuñes
Personal information
- Full name: Benevenuto Martins Nuñes
- Nationality: Brazil
- Born: 27 June 1913 Brazil
- Died: 7 May 1961 (aged 47)

Sport
- Sport: Swimming
- Strokes: Freestyle, Backstroke

Benevenuto Martins Nuñes (27 June 1913 – 7 May 1961) was an Olympic freestyle and backstroke swimmer from Brazil, who participated at two Summer Olympics for his native country. At the 1932 Summer Olympics in Los Angeles, he swam the 4×200-metre freestyle, finishing 7th in the final, along with Manoel Lourenço, Isaac Moraes and Manoel Villar. He also swam the 100-metre backstroke, not reaching the finals. At the 1936 Summer Olympics in Berlin, he swam the 100-metre backstroke, not reaching the finals.
