= Maiola Kalili =

American swimmer

Personal information
- Full name: Maiola Kalili
- National team: United States
- Born: November 3, 1909 Honolulu, Hawaii
- Died: August 23, 1972 (aged 62) Los Angeles, California, U.S.

Sport
- Sport: Swimming
- Strokes: Backstroke; Freestyle
- Club: Hui Makani Swim Club; Los Angeles Athletic Club
- Coach: Harvey Chilton (Hui Makani); Bob Kiphuth ('32 Olympics)
Medal record
Men's swimming
Representing the United States
Olympic Games
Silver medal – second place	1932 Los Angeles	4x200 m freestyle

Maiola Kalili (November 3, 1909 – August 23, 1972) was an American competition swimmer from Hawaii who represented the United States at the 1932 Summer Olympics in Los Angeles, California, capturing a silver medal in the 4x200-meter freestyle relay.

Maiola Kalili was born November 3, 1909 in Laie, Oahu, in greater Honolulu, Hawaii to Hamana Kalili Senior and Kaloha Kukuawakea Silva Meheula. Kalili started swimming in Honolulu harbor where he and his brother Manuella would dive for coins. He soon began to train in earnest with Harvey Chilton, of Honolulu's exceptional Hui Makani Swim Club. Maiola also trained with and represented the Los Angeles Allied Athletic Club during his swimming career.

At the 1930 American Athletic Union Nationals, in Long Beach, California, Kalili and Buster Crabbe won four national championships, and placed second in a total of five races. By 1930, Kalili held a district record for the 200 backstroke with a time of 2:48.6, and in early May, 1930 swam the 50-meter distance in :28 seconds. Best known for excelling in freestyle and backstroke, Kalili was the 1931 AAU outdoor champion in the 200 yard backstroke event held at Hawaii's War Memorial Natatorium in mid-July, and placed second in the 100-yard freestyle to brother Manuella. He placed fourth in the 1500 meter freestyle at the 1931 Outdoor Championships. At the Outdoor Nationals on July 18, 1930 at Honolulu's War Memorial Pool, the Hui Makani team of Johnny Wood, Manuella Kalili, Maurice Furusho, and Maiola Kalili set an unofficial record of 9:29.4 in the 4x200 meter relay, outpacing a former U.S. Olympic record time of 9:36.2.

In 1932, Maioli captured the AAU indoor freestyle titles in New Haven, Connecticut in both the 220 yard and 100 yard events and placed third in the 1500 meter freestyle, while finishing second in total points. Maiola Kalili and his brother Manuella were part of the 1931 U.S. National Swimming Team, coached by Bob Kiphuth of Yale, along with fellow Hui Makani Swim Club member Buster Crabbe. Swimming with the U.S. Team in Japan, Maiola broke the standing Japanese record in the 100 meter backstroke in the summer of 1930.

== 1932 Los Angeles Olympics ==
On the afternoon of August 9, 1932, Kailili won a silver medal at the Los Angeles Olympic Park Swimming Stadium as a member of the second-place U.S. team in the men's 4×200-meter freestyle relay, together with teammates Frank Booth, George Fissler and Maiola's younger brother Manuella Kalili. The American relay team recorded a time of 9:10.5, finishing around 12 seconds after the dominant Japanese team, whose time of 8:58.4 was a new world record, and a full thirty seconds faster than the prior record. Trailing well behind the second place American team, the Hungarian team placed third for the bronze with a time of 9:31.4. Hall of Fame Coach Bob Kiphuth of Yale coached the 1932 U.S. Men's Olympic team, and had served as the U.S. National team coach.

The U.S. Men's Olympic swimming team was outstanding in 1932, and included Maiola's chief rival and future film star Clarence “Buster” Crabbe, that years 400 meter freestyle gold medalist, Albert Schwartz, the 1932 100-meter freestyle bronze medalist, and James Cristy, 1932's 1500 freestyle bronze medalist. Triple gold medalist Helene Madison was a standout on the women's team. Better known Olympians during Kalili's era included film star Johnny Weissmuller, and Hawaiian Champion Duke Kahanamoku.

In 1933 Maiola retired from competitive swimming and appeared in the casts of a few movies as a South Sea native and later a Navy messman in a few war films. One of Kalili's better known films was 1953's Fair Wind to Java. He died August 23, 1972 in Los Angeles California.

=== Honors ===
Kalili was a member of the Hawai’i Sports Hall of Fame.

== See also ==
- List of Olympic medalists in swimming (men)
- Swimming at the 1932 Summer Olympics
