= Carlos Kennedy =

Argentine swimmer

Personal information
- Born: 16 February 1911 Entre Ríos, Argentina
- Died: 2 February 1967 (aged 55)

Sport
- Sport: Swimming

Carlos Kennedy (16 February 1911 – 2 February 1967) was an Argentine swimmer. He competed in the men's 4 × 200 metre freestyle relay at the 1932 Summer Olympics.
