= Isaac Moraes =

Brazilian swimmer (1914–1993)

Personal information
- Full name: Isaac dos Santos Moraes
- Nationality: Brazil
- Born: 26 July 1914 Brazil
- Died: 1 December 1993 (aged 79)

Sport
- Sport: Swimming
- Strokes: Freestyle

Isaac dos Santos Moraes (26 July 1914 – 1 December 1993) was an Olympic freestyle swimmer from Brazil, who participated at two Summer Olympics for his native country. At the 1932 Summer Olympics in Los Angeles, he swam the 4×200-metre freestyle, finishing 7th in the final, along with Manoel Lourenço, Manoel Villar and Benevenuto Nunes. At the 1936 Summer Olympics in Berlin, he swam the 100-metre and 4×200-metre freestyle, not reaching the finals.
