= László Szabados =

Hungarian swimmer (1911–1997)

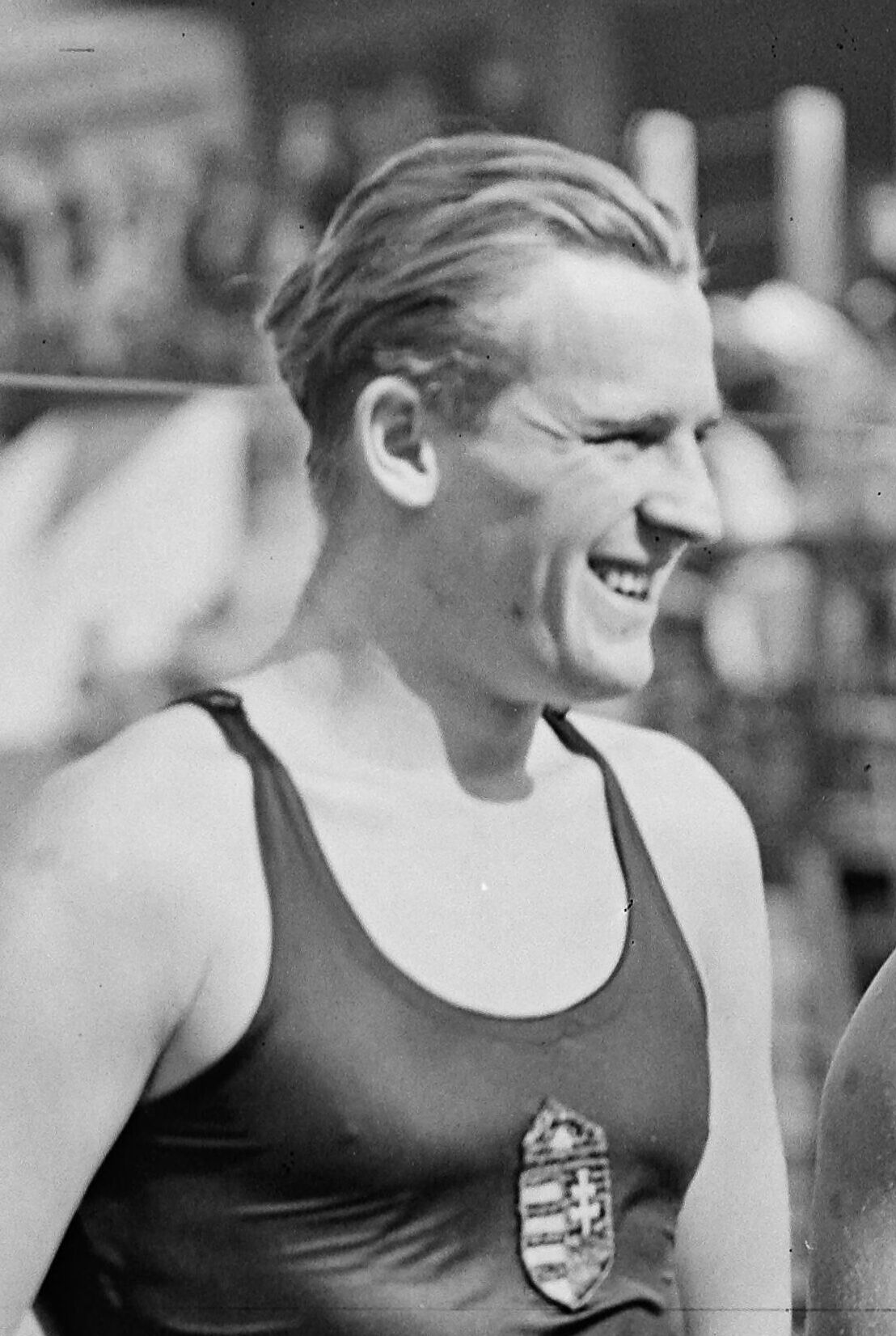
- László Szabados in 1931

Personal information
- Born: April 11, 1911 Szabadka, Austria-Hungary
- Died: October 17, 1997 (aged 86) Budapest, Hungary

Sport
- Sport: Swimming
Medal record
Representing Hungary
Olympic Games
Bronze medal – third place	1932 Los Angeles	4×200 m freestyle
European Championships
Gold medal – first place	1931 Paris	4×200 m freestyle

László Szabados (11 April 1911 – 17 October 1997) was a Hungarian swimmer who competed in the 1932 Summer Olympics. In the 1932 Olympics he won a bronze medal in the 4×200 m freestyle relay event.
