= Manoel Lourenço =

Brazilian swimmer (1907–1966)

Manoel Silva
Personal information
- Full name: Manoel Lourenço da Silva
- Nationality: Brazil
- Born: 4 May 1907 Brazil
- Died: 20 January 1966 (aged 58)

Sport
- Sport: Swimming
- Strokes: Freestyle

Manoel Lourenço da Silva (4 May 1907 – 20 January 1966) was an Olympic freestyle swimmer from Brazil, who participated at one Summer Olympics for his native country. At the 1932 Summer Olympics in Los Angeles, he swam the 4×200-metre freestyle, finishing 7th in the final, along with Isaac Moraes, Manoel Villar and Benevenuto Nunes.
