= Tatsugo Kawaishi =

Japanese swimmer (1911–1945)

Personal information
- Native name: 河石 達吾
- Nationality: Japanese
- Born: December 10, 1911 Etajima, Hiroshima, Japan
- Died: March 17, 1945 (aged 33) Iwo Jima, Volcano Islands, Japan

Sport
- Sport: Swimming
- Strokes: freestyle
Medal record
Men's Swimming
Representing Japan
Olympic Games
Silver medal – second place	1932 Los Angeles	100 m freestyle

Tatsugo Kawaishi (河石 達吾, Kawaishi Tatsugo; December 10, 1911 – March 17, 1945) was a Japanese swimmer who competed at the 1932 Summer Olympics in Los Angeles.

A native of Ōgaki, Hiroshima (currently part of the city of Etajima, Hiroshima), Kawaishi was a graduate of the law school of Keio University, and began competitive swimming as a student.

Selected for the Japanese Olympic team in the 1932 Los Angeles Olympics, he won a silver medal in the 100 m freestyle event; however, his achievement was overshadowed by his teammate Yasuji Miyazaki, who won the gold medal and who set a new Olympic record. After his return to Japan, he became an instructor at the Imperial Japanese Naval Academy from 1933 to 1935. He then moved to Osaka, and was employed by the forerunner of Kansai Electric; however, he then enlisted in the Imperial Japanese Army and was accepted into the Hiroshima-based IJA 11th Infantry Regiment.

Tatsugo Kawaishi during his military service

He was sent to serve on the front lines in China during the Second Sino-Japanese War and was promoted to first lieutenant after five years. Upon his discharge, he returned to work at Kansai Electric; however, during the Pacific War, as the situation worsened for Japan, he was recalled to active duty in June 1944 and was assigned to the garrison at Iwo Jima, where General Tadamichi Kuribayashi made him commander of the northern district of the island. He was killed in combat during the Battle of Iwo Jima on March 17, 1945, and was posthumously promoted to captain.
