= Marcel Manoël =

Marcel Manoël was the president of the National Council of the Reformed Church in France from his election in 2001 until his retirement in 2010.

== Early life and education ==
He was born in 1945 in Saint-Jean-du-Gard. He is married to Christiane Manen, teacher. They have three children and five grandchildren. He studied theology in Montpellier, Lausanne and Geneva.

== Ministry ==
Marcel Manoël was a pastor in Brazzaville and a teacher at the École pastorale du Congo (1968–1972). Nominated pastor in Nancy (1972–1973), pastor in Bangui, Central African Republic (1973–1977). Pastor in Clermont-Ferrand (1977–1978). President of the Regional Council of the Reformed Church in France for Centre-Alpes-Rhône from 1988–1996. Pastor in Nîmes, Oratoire parish from 1996–2001. He was a member of the National Council of the Reformed Church in France from 1986–1990, co-president of the Comité mixte catholique-Protestant in France from 1992–1998 and is a current member of the central committee of the World Council of Churches (appointed 1998).
