= Frank Dufina =

American golfer (1884–1972)

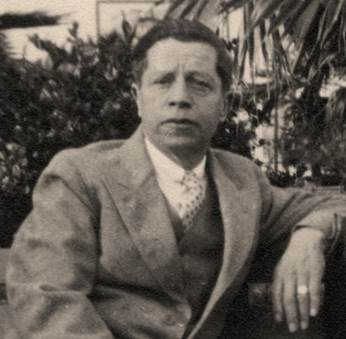
- Dufina circa 1935

Personal information
- Nationality: United States
- Born: June 30, 1884 Mackinac Island, Michigan, U.S.
- Died: August 11, 1972 (aged 88) Petoskey, Michigan, U.S.
- Spouse: Helen Beauchamp
- Children: Ursula Allen; Rosalie Burger; Adelaide Palmateer

Career
- Sport: Golf

Frank Dufina (June 30, 1884 – August 11, 1972) was an American professional golfer of original Mackinac, also known as Imakinakos or Michinemackinawgo, Indian descent in the early years of the sport in the United States.

Dufina began his career in 1898 at the just-opened Wawashkamo Golf Club on Mackinac Island, Michigan, where he became the club professional. A member of the Mackinac Island Band of Chippewa and Ottawa Indians as enumerated on the Durant Indian Rolls, he was among the first Native Americans to play golf on the professional circuit. Dufina played in the Western Open in 1911 and 1922.

He continued to play and in 1968 was named as the "Longest Working Golf Professional in History" by Golf Digest. He counted many early golf professionals among his friends, including golf legend Walter Hagen. In contrast with his friend Hagen's 5'10" stature, Dufina stood under 5' in height, often dwarfed by those around him. Though it is said that what he lacked in height, a traditional characteristic of the Michinemackinawgo people, he made up for in force of personality. He, along with other notable golfers such as Arnold Palmer, served as a pallbearer at Hagen's funeral. Named for him, the Frank Dufina Match Play Championship is held annually at Wawashkamo Golf Club. Wawashkamo's golf course is the oldest course in the state of Michigan.

Dufina was included in the 1999 book Walk a Crooked Trail – A Centennial History of Wawashkamo Golf Club. In 2023, Dufina was featured in the book The Charming Gentleman of the Game of Golf and in the 2024 book Native Links: The Surprising History of Our First People in Golf.
