= Shigeo Takahashi =

Japanese swimmer (1912–1990)

Personal information
- Born: 29 March 1912 Tokyo, Japan
- Died: 4 November 1990 (aged 78)

Sport
- Sport: Swimming
- Strokes: freestyle

Shigeo Takahashi (高橋 成夫, Takahashi Shigeo; 29 March 1912 – 4 November 1990) was a Japanese swimmer. He competed in the men's 100 metre freestyle at the 1932 Summer Olympics and the water polo tournament at the 1936 Summer Olympics.
