= Takashi Yokoyama (swimmer) =

Japanese swimmer (1913–1945)

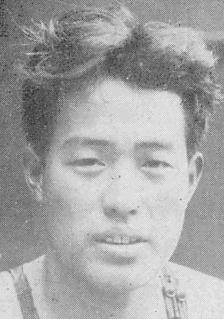

Personal information
- Born: December 13, 1913
- Died: 1945 (aged 31–32)

Sport
- Sport: Swimming
Medal record
Representing Japan
Olympic Games
Gold medal – first place	1932 Los Angeles	4x200 m freestyle

Takashi Yokoyama (横山 隆志, Yokoyama Takashi; 24 December 1913 – 1945) was a Japanese swimmer. He competed at the 1932 Summer Olympics, where he won a gold medal in the 4 × 200 m freestyle relay event. He died in Kōchi, Japan.
