= Hisakichi Toyoda =

Japanese swimmer (1912–1976)

Personal information
- Born: January 2, 1912
- Died: October 7, 1976 (aged 64)
Medal record
Men's Swimming
Representing Japan
Olympic Games
Gold medal – first place	1932 Los Angeles	4×200 m freestyle

Hisakichi Toyoda (豊田 久吉, Toyoda Hisakichi) (January 2, 1912 – October 7, 1976) was a Japanese swimmer who competed at the 1932 Summer Olympics. There he won the gold medal in the 4 × 200 m freestyle relay event. He was born in Yamaguchi, Japan, and is the grandfather of three-time Olympian Kenji Watanabe.
