= George Fissler =

American swimmer

- Fissler, 1932 Olympic photo

Personal information
- Full name: George Robert Fissler
- Nickname: "Dutch"
- National team: United States
- Born: October 13, 1906 New York, New York, U.S.
- Died: December 18, 1975 (aged 69) Stuart, Florida, U.S.
- Spouse: Thelma

Sport
- Sport: Swimming
- Strokes: Freestyle
- Club: New York Athletic Club
Medal record
Men's swimming
Representing the United States
Olympic Games
| Silver medal – second place | 1932 Los Angeles | 4x200 m freestyle |

George Robert Fissler (October 13, 1906 – December 18, 1975) was an American competition swimmer who represented the United States at the 1932 Summer Olympics in Los Angeles, California. Fissler, who competed for the New York Athletic Club, won a silver medal as a member of the second-place U.S. team in the men's 4×200-meter freestyle relay.

Born October 13, 1906 in New York, he first learned to swim in the East River according to a few press accounts and started swimming and competing in earnest around 1920 at the age of 14 for the New York City Boys Club on New York City's East Side.

== Early swimming achievements ==
On August 10, 1924, swimming for the Boy's Club of New York City, Fissler won the one-mile championship for the Alamac Swimming Association in Lake Hopatcong by a margin of around 30 feet. Fissler had formerly won the Metropolitan Senior Half Mile Championship. In 1928, swimming for the NYAC, Fissler won the 100-yard backstroke in a pool record time of 1:08.2 and the 100-yard freestyle race in a pool record time of 55.6 seconds, while competing for the Alamac trophy sponsored by the Hygeia Club at the Hygeia Pool in Atlantic City.

While swimming for the New York Athletic Club in June, 1929, Fissler was the high scorer at the Valley Stream Long Island, Championship meet, winning the 100-yard freestyle in :56 seconds, and taking second in both the 200-yard freestyle, and 100-yard backstroke. Fissler helped lead the NYAC to the team championship.

== 1932 Olympic Silver medal ==
Fissler won the 200-meter freestyle at the Finals of the 1932 Olympic Trials to earn a place on the 4x200 relay team. At the time, there was no individual 200-meter freestyle event.

At the 1932 Summer Olympics, on August 9, 1932, at the age of 25, Fissler won a silver medal as a member of the second-place U.S. team in the men's 4×200-meter freestyle relay, with fellow teammates Frank Booth and Hawaiian-Americans Maiola Kalili and his brother Manuella Kalili. Fissler swam the second leg of the 4 person relay. Fissler's 4x200-meter American team swam a 9:10.5, and broke the world record, but the winning Japanese team had broken the world record as well and finished 12 seconds earlier, considered a significant margin. Despite the Olympic swimming competition taking place at America's Los Angeles Memorial Coliseum, the Japanese swimming team won 12 medals, two more than the American team.

== 1933 220-yard national title ==
Though in his early career, he excelled in distance swims's Fissler's most significant championship was likely his single American Athletic Union national championship title in 1933 when he captured the indoor 220-yard freestyle. Defeating a field of well-known competitors, Fissler swam a 2:13.6 for the event, finishing around 5 yards ahead of second place Ted Wiget of Stanford University. He made gains on each turn. His time was four seconds behind the record held by Olympic medalist Johnny Weissmuller. Fissler also was on the winning 4x100-yard freestyle relay team at the 1933 meet.

== Later life ==
He was a Navy veteran of WWII, and worked thirty-six years as a Civil Engineer for the City of New York before his retirement.

Fissler died at the age of 69 in Stuart, Florida on December 18, 1975. He was a member of the U.S. Power Squadron of Pompano Beach, the Navy League of the United States, and American Legion Post 62. He was survived by his wife Thelma, two daughters and grandchildren. Funeral services were held December 20, 1975 at St. Mary's Episcopal.

== See also ==
- List of Olympic medalists in swimming (men)
