= András Wanié =

Hungarian swimmer

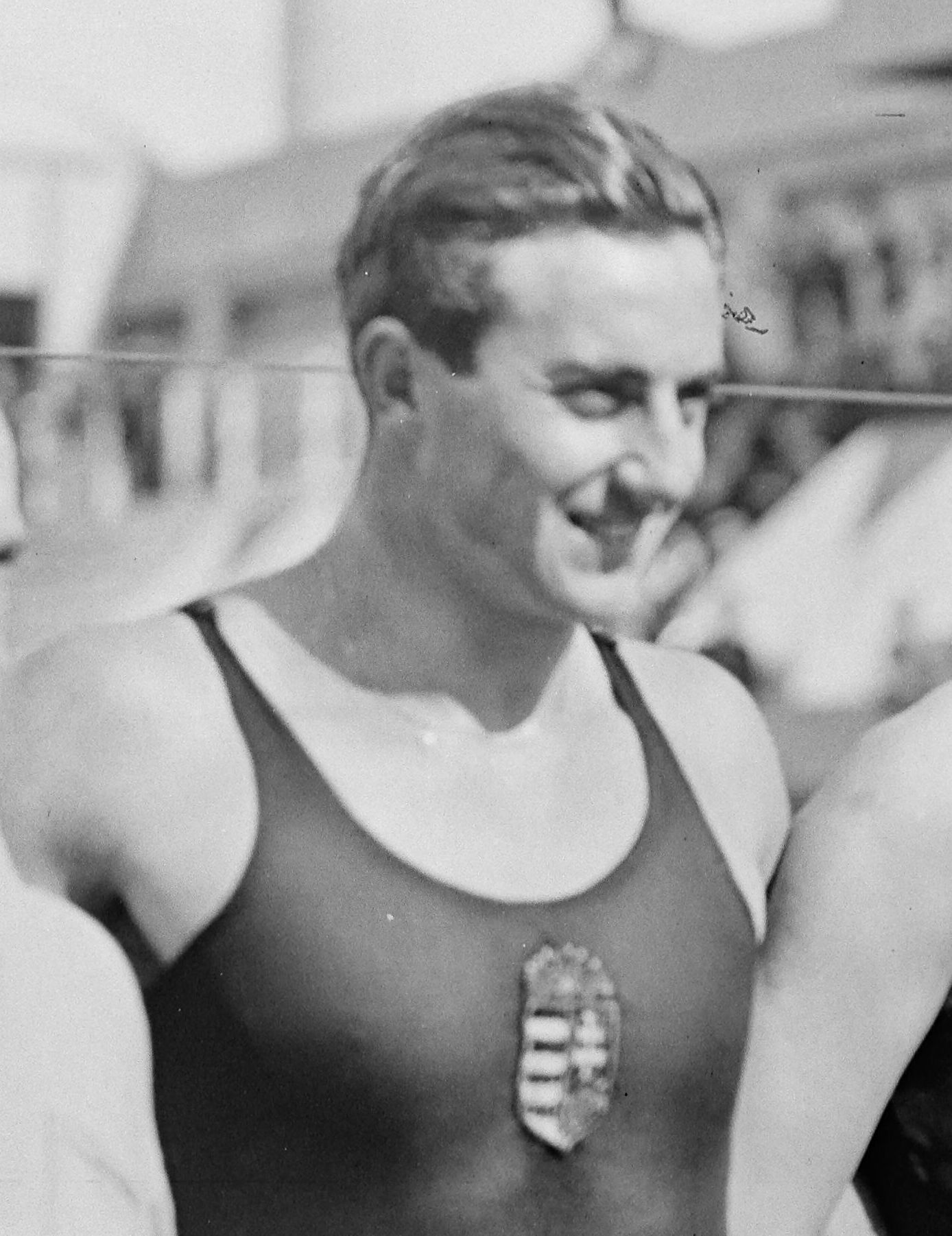
- András Wanié in 1931

Personal information
- Born: April 23, 1911 Szeged, Austria-Hungary
- Died: November 12, 1976 (aged 65) Sacramento, California, United States

Sport
- Sport: Swimming
Medal record
Representing Hungary
Olympic Games
Bronze medal – third place	1932 Los Angeles	4×200 m freestyle
European Championships
Gold medal – first place	1931 Paris	4×200 m freestyle
Silver medal – second place	1926 Budapest	4×200 m freestyle
Bronze medal – third place	1927 Bologna	4×200 m freestyle

András Wanié (23 April 1911 – 12 November 1976) was a Hungarian swimmer who competed in the 1928 Summer Olympics and 1932 Summer Olympics.

He was born in Szeged and died in Sacramento, California, United States.

In the 1928 Olympics he was fourth in the 4×200 m freestyle relay event.

Four years later he won a bronze medal in the 4×200 m freestyle relay event. He also was fourth in his first round heat of 100 m freestyle event and did not advance.
