= Sérgio Manoel =

Sérgio Manoel may refer to:

- Sérgio Manoel (footballer, born 1972), Brazilian football attacking midfielder
- Sérgio Manoel (footballer, born 1989) (1989–2016), Brazilian football defensive midfielder
