= István Bárány =

Hungarian swimmer (1907–1995)

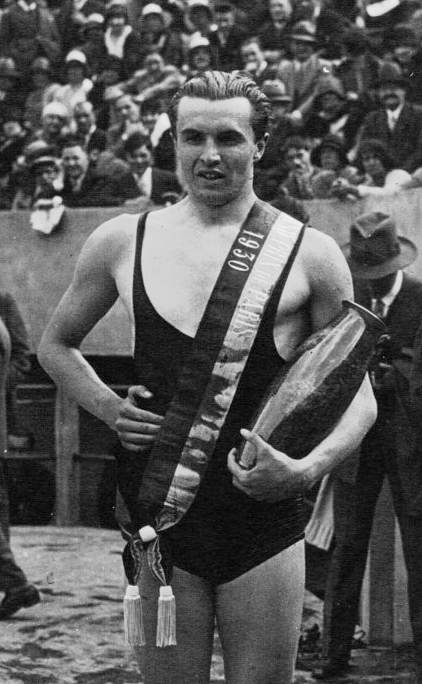
- István Bárány in 1930

Personal information
- Full name: Bárány István
- Nationality: Hungarian
- Born: 20 December 1907 Eger, Heves
- Died: 21 February 1995 (aged 87) Budapest

Sport
- Sport: Swimming
- Strokes: Freestyle
- Club: Magyar Véderő Egylet; Egri Sportegyesület
Medal record
Representing Hungary
Olympic Games
Silver medal – second place	1928 Amsterdam	100 m freestyle
Bronze medal – third place	1932 Los Angeles	4×200 m freestyle
European Championships
Gold medal – first place	1926 Budapest	100 m freestyle
Gold medal – first place	1931 Paris	100 m freestyle
Gold medal – first place	1931 Paris	400 m freestyle
Gold medal – first place	1931 Paris	4×200 m freestyle
Silver medal – second place	1926 Budapest	4×200 m freestyle
Silver medal – second place	1927 Bologna	100 m freestyle
Bronze medal – third place	1927 Bologna	4×200 m freestyle

István Bárány (20 December 1907 – 21 February 1995) was a Hungarian swimmer who competed at the 1924, 1928 and 1932 Summer Olympics.

In 1924 he was twelfth in the 100 m freestyle. Four years later he won a silver medal in 100 m freestyle and was fourth in the 4×200 m freestyle relay. In 1932, he won a bronze medal in the 4×200 m freestyle relay and was eliminated in a semifinal of 100 m freestyle.

Between 1926 and 1931 Bárány won four European titles. In 1929 he became the second person, after Johnny Weissmuller, to swim 100 m within a minute. Bárány held a PhD in law and political science. From 1957 to 1959 he served as the general secretary of the Hungarian Swimming Association. He was also a national coach and an international referee and wrote more than 30 books on swimming. In 1978 he was inducted into the International Swimming Hall of Fame.

== See also ==
- List of members of the International Swimming Hall of Fame
