= Albert Schwartz (swimmer) =

American swimmer (1907–1986)

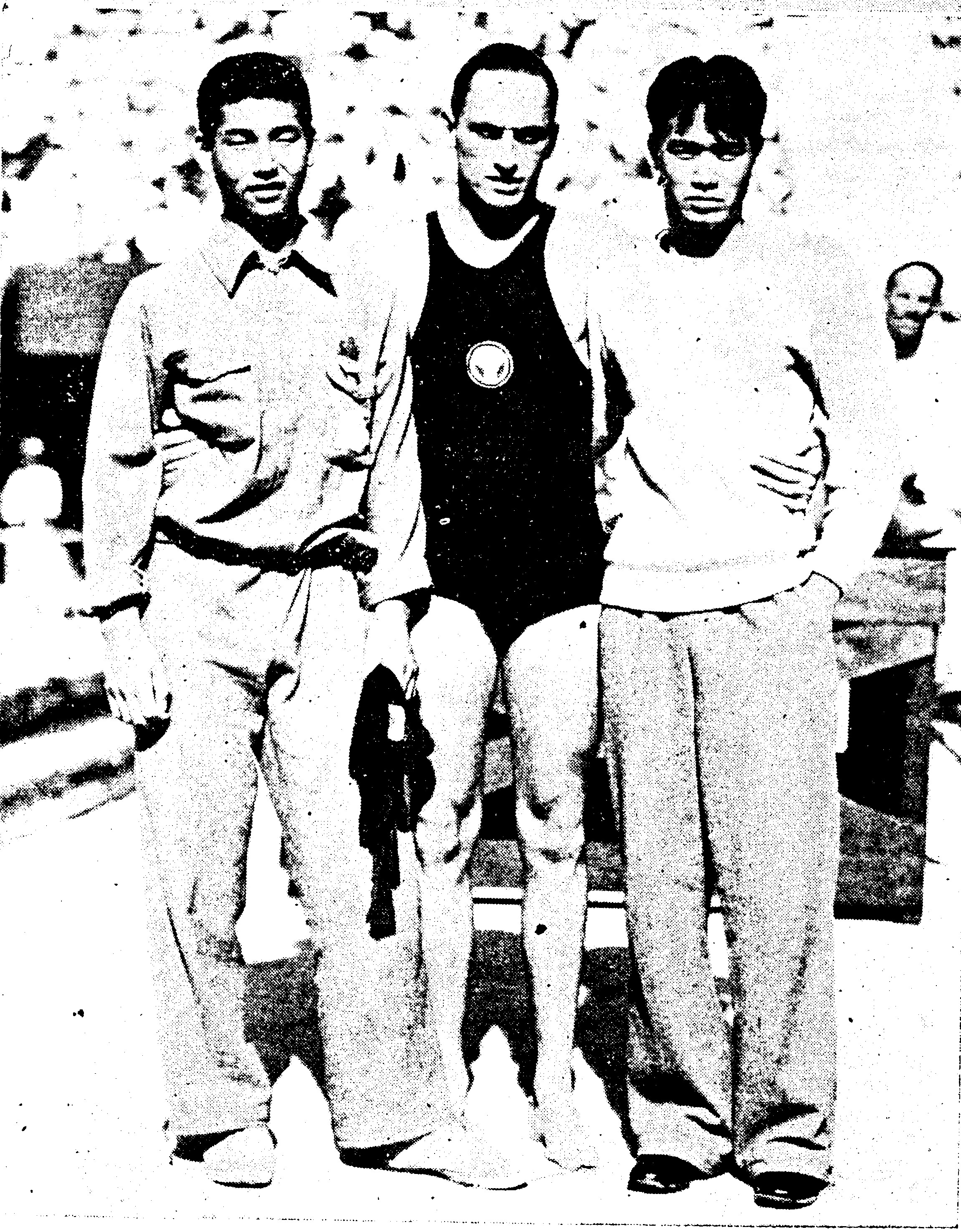
- Schwartz in 1932

Personal information
- Full name: Albert L. Schwartz
- Nickname: "Al"
- National team: United States
- Born: December 21, 1907 Chicago, Illinois, U.S.
- Died: December 7, 1986 (aged 77) Los Angeles, California, U.S.
- Education: Northwesern, University of Chicago Law
- Occupation: Attorney
- Spouse: Lois

Sport
- Event: Freestyle
- College team: Northwestern University
- Club: Illinois Athletic Club
- Coached by: Bill Bachrach (IAC); Thomas H. Robinson (Northwestern)
Medal record
Men's swimming
Representing the United States
Olympic Games
Bronze medal – third place	1932 Los Angeles	100 m freestyle

Albert L. Schwartz (December 21, 1907 – December 7, 1986) was an American attorney who practiced in California and a competition swimmer who represented the United States at the 1932 Summer Olympics in Los Angeles, California. Schwartz received a bronze medal for his performance in the men's 100-meter freestyle, finishing third in a time of 58.8 seconds in the event final. His win came after the reign of actor Johnny Weissmuller as Olympic swimming freestyle sprinting champion, after Weissmuller accepted a Hollywood movie contract.

Schwartz first became a national swimming champion at Marshall High School in Chicago. Beginning his Northwestern University Wildcats swimming career in 1928, Schwartz was ranked as the nation's outstanding freestyle swimmer for his entire time in college, where he swam for Hall of Fame Coach Thomas "Tom" H. Robinson. Schwartz came very close to making the 1928 Olympic Swimming Team, but fell short. While attending Northwestern, he became the first swimmer to score a triple victory at the NCAA championships when he took three freestyle titles at the 1930 indoor meet. Playing for the Illinois AC, Schwartz was on six winning teams at the AAU water polo championships. An exceptionally consistent performer, at one time he held all national swimming records from 550 to 220 yards.

== Personal life and law career ==
Schwartz had two sisters and was married to his wife Lois. After graduating from Northwestern, he attended law school at the University of Chicago and later practiced law in California. He was a member of both the Illinois and California State Bars. He died on December 7, 1986, in Los Angeles.

== Honors ==
He was a member of the U.S. Olympians, the National Swimming Hall of Fame, and the USA Water Polo Hall of Fame as a 1981 inductee. In 1984, he became one of 12 Charter Inductees into the Northwestern University Athletic Hall of Fame for the years 1928-30.

== See also ==
- List of Northwestern University alumni
- List of Olympic medalists in swimming (men)
- List of select Jewish swimmers
