= Manoel Villar =

Brazilian swimmer

Personal information
- Full name: Manoel da Rocha Villar
- Nationality: Brazil
- Born: 21 November 1912 Brazil
- Died: 9 October 2011 (aged 98)

Sport
- Sport: Swimming
- Strokes: Freestyle

Manoel da Rocha Villar (21 November 1912 – 9 October 2011) was an Olympic freestyle swimmer from Brazil, who participated at two Summer Olympics for his native country. At the 1932 Summer Olympics in Los Angeles, he swam the 4×200-metre freestyle, finishing 7th in the final, along with Manoel Lourenço, Isaac Moraes and Benevenuto Nunes. He also swam the 100-metre freestyle, not reaching the finals. At the 1936 Summer Olympics in Berlin, he swam the 400-metre, 1500-metre, and 4×200-metre freestyle, not reaching the finals.
