= András Székely =

Hungarian swimmer (1910–1943)

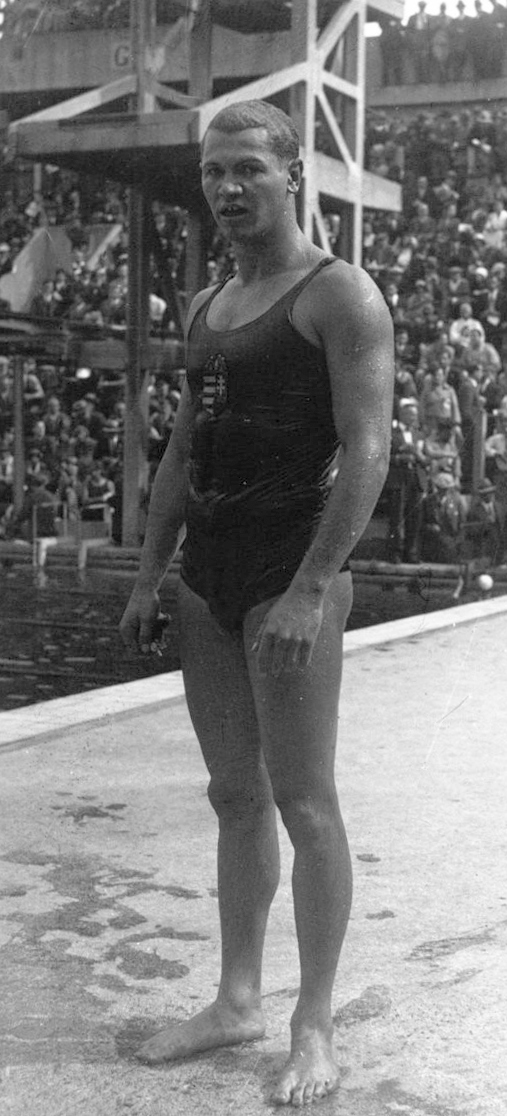
- ASzékely at the 1931 European Championships

Personal information
- Born: 5 March 1910 Tatabánya, Austria-Hungary
- Died: 25 January 1943 (aged 32) Chernihiv, Reichskommissariat Ukraine

Sport
- Sport: Swimming
- Club: Ferencvárosi TC, Budapest
Medal record
Representing Hungary
Olympic Games
Bronze medal – third place	1932 Los Angeles	4×200 m freestyle
European Championships
Gold medal – first place	1931 Paris	4×200 m freestyle
Silver medal – second place	1931 Paris	100 m freestyle

András Székely (5 March 1910 – 25 January 1943) was a Hungarian swimmer who won a bronze medal in the 4 × 200 m freestyle relay at the 1932 Summer Olympics. He won a European title in this event in 1931.

Székely was Jewish. He was killed by the Nazis in 1943 at a forced labor camp in Chernihiv, Ukraine.

== See also ==
- List of select Jewish swimmers
