= Yasuji Miyazaki =

Japanese swimmer (1916–1989)

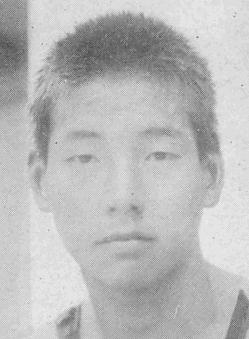

Personal information
- Full name: 宮崎 康二
- Nationality: Japanese
- Born: October 15, 1916 Kosai, Shizuoka, Japan
- Died: December 30, 1989 (aged 73)

Sport
- Sport: Swimming
- Strokes: freestyle
Medal record
Men's Swimming
Representing Japan
Olympic Games
Gold medal – first place	1932 Los Angeles	100 m freestyle
Gold medal – first place	1932 Los Angeles	4x200 m freestyle

Yasuji Miyazaki (宮崎 康二, Miyazaki Yasuji) (October 15, 1916 – December 30, 1989) was a Japanese swimmer who competed at the 1932 Summer Olympics in Los Angeles.

Miyazaki was born in Kosai, Shizuoka Prefecture, Japan. He was selected for the Japanese Olympic team for the 1932 Los Angeles Olympics at the age of 15, and was one of the youngest members. In the semi-finals of the 100 m freestyle event, he surpassed the Olympic record previously set by American champion Johnny Weissmuller with a time of 58.2 seconds, and won the gold medal. The following day, as part of the team competing in the 4 × 200 m freestyle relay event, he won a second gold medal, with the team setting a new world record of 8 minutes 58.4 seconds. After his return to Japan, he entered Keio University and retired from competitive sports.

== See also ==
- List of members of the International Swimming Hall of Fame
