= Manuella Kalili =

American swimmer

Manuela Kalili
Personal information
- Full name: Manuela Kalili
- National team: United States
- Born: November 2, 1912 Honolulu, Territory of Hawaii
- Died: September 14, 1969 (aged 56) Honolulu, Hawaii, U.S.
- Spouse: Rosaliend Tiiloni Vasey (1935)

Sport
- Sport: Swimming
- Events: 1 mile, 100-yards, 200-yards
- Strokes: Freestyle
- Club: Los Angeles Athletic Club; Hui Makani Club
- Coach: Harvey Chilton (Hui Makani)
Medal record
Men's swimming
Representing the United States
Olympic Games
Silver medal – second place	1932 Los Angeles	4x200 m freestyle

Manuella or Manuela Kalili (2 November 1912 – 14 September 1969) was a Native Hawaiian competition swimmer who represented the United States at the 1932 Summer Olympics in Los Angeles, California.

Kalili was born November 2, 1912 to Hamana Kalili Senior and Kaloha Kukuawakea Silva Meheula in Laie in greater Honolulu, Oahu, Hawaii. He became known in his youth for swimming in Honolulu Harbor where he would dive for coins with his brother Maiola. He soon began to train in earnest with Harvey Chilton, of Honolulu's exceptional Hui Makani Swim Club.

On June 11, 1929, Kalili broke the Junior national record for the one-mile swim with a time of 23:42.2, placing first at the Junior District meet for the event at the War Memorial Pool in Honolulu. Though he was ruled ineligible to be the Junior National Champion as he had already competed in the Senior division, his record time was recorded. His brother Maiola placed second and became the Junior National Champion in the event. In one of his most noteworthy swims, Manuella later captured a victory in the American Athletic Union outdoor 100m freestyle in 1931.

Manuella Kalili and his brother Maiola were part of the 1931 U.S. National Swimming Team, coached by Bob Kiphuth of Yale, along with fellow Hui Makani Swim Club member Buster Crabbe who had also lived in Hawaii.

== 1932 Summer Olympics ==
Swimming a combined time of 9:10.5 as a member of the second-place U.S. team in the men's 4×200-meter freestyle relay event, Manuella won a silver medal with fellow Americans Frank Booth, George Fissler and his older brother Maiola Kalili. Individually, Manuella placed fourth overall in the men's 100-meter freestyle with a time of 59.2, only .6 seconds behind the bronze medal winner, Albert Schwartz of the USA who swam a 59.8. Yasuji Mayazaki took the gold with a time of 58.2, and fellow Japanese team member Tatsugo Kawaishi took the silver with a time of 58.6 Among the great Olympians on the US team that year were Chicago native and future film star Johnny Weismueller, and Hawaiian legend Duke Mahanamoku.

Leaving swimming competition around 1933, Kalili found small roles in several films, usually cast as a mess worker for the Navy in war films or as a native South Sea Islander. In 1935, he married Marie Rosaliend Tiiloni Vasey Horton. He was later married to Faasese Asuega Burdy Paahana. He completed well-received swimming tours of Japan, Australia, and the United States mainland.

Kalili died at 56 at the Queen's Medical Center in Honolulu on September 14, 1969. After cremation, services were conducted and his remains were scattered at sea at Hamana Beach at Laie Hukilau on the morning of September 20.

== See also ==
- List of Olympic medalists in swimming (men)
