= Manoelzinho (footballer, born 1940) =

Brazilian footballer

Personal information
- Full name: Manoel José Dias
- Date of birth: 25 January 1940
- Place of birth: Montes Claros, Brazil
- Date of death: May 2004 (aged 64)
- Place of death: Montes Claros, Brazil
- Position: Forward

Senior career*
Years	Team	Apps	(Gls)
1957–1961	Flamengo	48	(32)
1961–1965	Corinthians	111	(58)
1965	Bangu		

International career
1959	Brazil	2	(3)
Medal record
Men's Football
Representing Brazil
Pan American Games
Silver medal – second place	1959 Chicago
- * Club domestic league appearances and goals

Manoel José Dias (25 January 1940 – May 2004), known as Manoelzinho, was a Brazilian footballer.

== Club career ==
He played for Flamengo, Corinthians and Bangu during his career. He stood out for his excellent goal averages for all the teams he played for.

== International career ==
Manuelzinho represented the Brazil national team at the 1959 Pan American Games, where the team won the silver medal.

== Personal life ==
Dias' grandson Matt Dibley-Dias also became a footballer.

== Honours ==
Flamengo

- Torneio Rio-São Paulo: 1961

Corinthians

- Taça São Paulo: 1962
