= Manoelzinho (footballer, born 1907) =

Brazilian footballer

Personal information
- Full name: Manoel de Aguiar Fagundes
- Date of birth: 22 August 1907
- Place of birth: Niterói, Brazil
- Date of death: 22 November 1953 (aged 46)
- Position: Striker

Senior career*
Years	Team	Apps	(Gls)
1926–1930	Ypiranga	?	(?)
1930	Goytacaz	?	(?)
1930–1931	Ypiranga	?	(?)
1932	Byron Niterói	?	(?)
1933–1935	Ypiranga	?	(?)
1935–1939	Canto do Rio	?	(?)

International career
	Brasil	?	(?)
- * Club domestic league appearances and goals

Manoel de Aguiar Fagundes (22 August 1907 – 22 November 1953) was a Brazilian football player.
