= List of multiple Olympic medalists =

This article provides a list of multiple Olympic medalists, i.e. those athletes who have won multiple Olympic medals at either the Summer Olympic Games or the Winter Olympic Games.

== List of Olympic medals over career ==
This list includes athletes who have won six or more Olympic medals over their sporting career. It includes top-three placings in the 1896 Olympic Games and 1900 Olympic Games, before medals were actually awarded for those placings. Medals won in the 1906 Intercalated Games are not included. For simplicity, when an athlete has won medals for more than one nation, their entry in this list only mentions the last Nation represented. The Years listed for each athlete only include the Games in which they won medals. More detailed information is provided in the linked articles for the individual athletes.

In cases where two or more athletes have the same number of total medals, the first tiebreaker is the number of gold medals, followed by the number of silver medals. If the tied athletes have exactly the same number of gold, silver and bronze medals, the ranking is given as a tie and the athletes are listed in order first by career years and then alphabetically by surname.

No.	Athlete	Nation	Sport	Years	Games	Gender	Gold	Silver	Bronze	Total
1	Michael Phelps	United States	Swimming	2004–2016	Summer	M	23	3	2	28
2	Larisa Latynina	Soviet Union	Gymnastics	1956–1964	Summer	F	9	5	4	18
3	Marit Bjørgen	Norway	Cross-country skiing	2002–2018	Winter	F	8	4	3	15
4	Nikolai Andrianov	Soviet Union	Gymnastics	1972–1980	Summer	M	7	5	3	15
5	Katie Ledecky	United States	Swimming	2012–2024	Summer	F	9	4	1	14
6	Isabell Werth	Germany	Equestrian	1992–2024	Summer	F	8	6	0	14
7	Ole Einar Bjørndalen	Norway	Biathlon	1998–2014	Winter	M	8	4	2	14
8	Emma McKeon	Australia	Swimming	2016–2024	Summer	F	6	3	5	14
9	Arianna Fontana	Italy	Short-track speed skating	2006–2026	Winter	F	3	6	5	14
10	Johannes Høsflot Klæbo	Norway	Cross-country skiing	2018–2026	Winter	M	11	1	1	13
11	Boris Shakhlin	Soviet Union	Gymnastics	1956–1964	Summer	M	7	4	2	13
12	Edoardo Mangiarotti	Italy	Fencing	1936–1960	Summer	M	6	5	2	13
13	Ireen Wüst	Netherlands	Speed skating	2006–2022	Winter	F	6	5	2	13
14	Takashi Ono	Japan	Gymnastics	1952–1964	Summer	M	5	4	4	13
15	Paavo Nurmi	Finland	Athletics	1920–1928	Summer	M	9	3	0	12
16	Birgit Fischer	East Germany; Germany	Canoeing	1980–2004	Summer	F	8	4	0	12
16	Bjørn Dæhlie	Norway	Cross-country skiing	1992–1998	Winter	M	8	4	0	12
18	Jenny Thompson	United States	Swimming	1992–2004	Summer	F	8	3	1	12
18	Sawao Katō	Japan	Gymnastics	1968–1976	Summer	M	8	3	1	12
20	Ryan Lochte	United States	Swimming	2004–2016	Summer	M	6	3	3	12
21	Dara Torres	United States	Swimming	1984–2008	Summer	F	4	4	4	12
22	Alexei Nemov	Russia	Gymnastics	1996–2000	Summer	M	4	2	6	12
23	Natalie Coughlin	United States	Swimming	2004–2012	Summer	F	3	4	5	12
24	Mark Spitz	United States	Swimming	1968–1972	Summer	M	9	1	1	11
25	Matt Biondi	United States	Swimming	1984–1992	Summer	M	8	2	1	11
26	Věra Čáslavská	Czechoslovakia	Gymnastics	1960–1968	Summer	F	7	4	0	11
27	Allyson Felix	United States	Athletics	2004–2020	Summer	F	7	3	1	11
27	Viktor Chukarin	Soviet Union	Gymnastics	1952–1956	Summer	M	7	3	1	11
29	Simone Biles	United States	Gymnastics	2016–2024	Summer	F	7	2	2	11
30	Carl Osburn	United States	Shooting	1912–1924	Summer	M	5	4	2	11
31	Carl Lewis	United States	Athletics	1984–1996	Summer	M	9	1	0	10
31	Caeleb Dressel	United States	Swimming	2016–2024	Summer	M	9	1	0	10
33	Aladár Gerevich	Hungary	Fencing	1932–1960	Summer	M	7	1	2	10
34	Akinori Nakayama	Japan	Gymnastics	1968–1972	Summer	M	6	2	2	10
35	Vitaly Scherbo	Unified Team; Belarus	Gymnastics	1992–1996	Summer	M	6	0	4	10
36	Gary Hall Jr.	United States	Swimming	1996–2004	Summer	M	5	3	2	10
36	Ágnes Keleti	Hungary	Gymnastics	1952–1956	Summer	F	5	3	2	10
38	Polina Astakhova	Soviet Union	Gymnastics	1956–1964	Summer	F	5	2	3	10
39	Raisa Smetanina	Soviet Union; Unified Team	Cross-country skiing	1976–1992	Winter	F	4	5	1	10
40	Allison Schmitt	United States	Swimming	2008–2020	Summer	F	4	3	3	10
41	Alexander Dityatin	Soviet Union	Gymnastics	1976–1980	Summer	M	3	6	1	10
42	Miho Takagi	Japan	Speed skating	2018–2026	Winter	F	2	4	4	10
43	Stefania Belmondo	Italy	Cross-country skiing	1992–2002	Winter	F	2	3	5	10
43	Zhang Yufei	China	Swimming	2020–2024	Summer	F	2	3	5	10
45	Franziska van Almsick	Germany	Swimming	1992–2004	Summer	F	0	4	6	10
46	Lisa Carrington	New Zealand	Canoeing	2012–2024	Summer	F	8	0	1	9
47	Jason Kenny	Great Britain	Cycling	2008–2020	Summer	M	7	2	0	9
48	Hubert Van Innis	Belgium	Archery	1900–1920	Summer	M	6	3	0	9
48	Lyubov Yegorova	Unified Team; Russia	Cross-country skiing	1992–1994	Winter	F	6	3	0	9
50	Valentina Vezzali	Italy	Fencing	1996–2012	Summer	F	6	1	2	9
51	Nadia Comăneci	Romania	Gymnastics	1976–1980	Summer	F	5	3	1	9
51	Quentin Fillon Maillet	France	Biathlon	2022–2026	Winter	M	5	3	1	9
51	Ian Thorpe	Australia	Swimming	2000–2004	Summer	M	5	3	1	9
54	Claudia Pechstein	Germany	Speed skating	1992–2006	Winter	F	5	2	2	9
54	Johannes Thingnes Bø	Norway	Biathlon	2014–2022	Winter	M	5	2	2	9
54	Ryan Murphy	United States	Swimming	2016–2024	Summer	M	5	2	2	9
57	Mitsuo Tsukahara	Japan	Gymnastics	1968–1976	Summer	M	5	1	3	9
57	Kaylee McKeown	Australia	Swimming	2020–2024	Summer	F	5	1	3	9
59	Alexander Popov	Unified Team; Russia	Swimming	1992–2000	Summer	M	4	5	0	9
60	Sixten Jernberg	Sweden	Cross-country skiing	1956–1964	Winter	M	4	3	2	9
60	Emil Hegle Svendsen	Norway	Biathlon	2010–2018	Winter	M	4	3	2	9
60	Ludmilla Tourischeva	Soviet Union	Gymnastics	1968–1976	Summer	F	4	3	2	9
63	Sven Kramer	Netherlands	Speed skating	2006–2018	Winter	M	4	2	3	9
64	Charlotte Kalla	Sweden	Cross-country skiing	2010–2018	Winter	F	3	6	0	9
65	Anky van Grunsven	Netherlands	Equestrian	1992–2012	Summer	F	3	5	1	9
65	Leisel Jones	Australia	Swimming	2000–2012	Summer	F	3	5	1	9
67	Giulio Gaudini	Italy	Fencing	1928–1936	Summer	M	3	4	2	9
67	Alexander Bolshunov	Olympic Athletes from Russia; ROC	Cross-country skiing	2018–2022	Winter	M	3	4	2	9
69	Alfred Swahn	Sweden	Shooting	1908–1924	Summer	M	3	3	3	9
69	Eizo Kenmotsu	Japan	Gymnastics	1968–1976	Summer	M	3	3	3	9
71	Mikhail Voronin	Soviet Union	Gymnastics	1968–1972	Summer	M	2	6	1	9
72	Uschi Disl	Germany	Biathlon	1992–2006	Winter	F	2	4	3	9
73	Heikki Savolainen	Finland	Gymnastics	1928–1952	Summer	M	2	1	6	9
74	Yuri Titov	Soviet Union	Gymnastics	1956–1964	Summer	M	1	5	3	9
75	Kyle Chalmers	Australia	Swimming	2016–2024	Summer	M	1	3	5	9
76	Merlene Ottey	Jamaica	Athletics	1980–2000	Summer	F	0	3	6	9
77	Usain Bolt	Jamaica	Athletics	2008–2016	Summer	M	8	0	0	8
77	Ray Ewry	United States	Athletics	1900–1908	Summer	M	8	0	0	8
79	Tobias Arlt	Germany	Luge	2014–2026	Winter	M	7	0	1	8
79	Tobias Wendl	Germany	Luge	2014–2026	Winter	M	7	0	1	8
81	Gert Fredriksson	Sweden	Canoeing	1948–1960	Summer	M	6	1	1	8
81	Danuta Kozák	Hungary	Canoeing	2008–2020	Summer	F	6	1	1	8
83	Reiner Klimke	United Team of Germany; West Germany	Equestrian	1964–1988	Summer	M	6	0	2	8
83	Viktor An (b. Ahn Hyun-Soo)	South Korea; Russia	Short-track speed skating	2006–2014	Winter	M	6	0	2	8
85	Ville Ritola	Finland	Athletics	1924–1928	Summer	M	5	3	0	8
86	Elisabeta Lipă	Romania	Rowing	1984–2004	Summer	F	5	2	1	8
87	Bradley Wiggins	Great Britain	Cycling	2000–2016	Summer	M	5	1	2	8
87	Nathan Adrian	United States	Swimming	2008–2016	Summer	M	5	1	2	8
87	Mollie O'Callaghan	Australia	Swimming	2020–2024	Summer	F	5	1	2	8
90	Dawn Fraser	Australia	Swimming	1956–1964	Summer	F	4	4	0	8
90	Kornelia Ender	East Germany	Swimming	1972–1976	Summer	F	4	4	0	8
92	Ricco Groß	Germany	Biathlon	1992–2006	Winter	M	4	3	1	8
92	Georges Miez	Switzerland	Gymnastics	1924–1936	Summer	M	4	3	1	8
92	Otto Olsen	Norway	Shooting	1920–1924	Summer	M	4	3	1	8
92	Ariarne Titmus	Australia	Swimming	2020–2024	Summer	F	4	3	1	8
96	Kjetil André Aamodt	Norway	Alpine skiing	1992–2006	Winter	M	4	2	2	8
96	Sven Fischer	Germany	Biathlon	1994–2006	Winter	M	4	2	2	8
96	Jason Lezak	United States	Swimming	2000–2012	Summer	M	4	2	2	8
96	Galina Kulakova	Soviet Union	Cross-country skiing	1972–1980	Winter	F	4	2	2	8
96	Roland Matthes	East Germany	Swimming	1968–1976	Summer	M	4	2	2	8
96	Inge de Bruijn	Netherlands	Swimming	2000–2004	Summer	F	4	2	2	8
102	Giovanna Trillini	Italy	Fencing	1992–2008	Summer	F	4	1	3	8
102	Cate Campbell	Australia	Swimming	2008–2020	Summer	F	4	1	3	8
104	Katalin Kovács	Hungary	Canoeing	2000–2012	Summer	F	3	5	0	8
105	Philippe Cattiau	France	Fencing	1920–1936	Summer	M	3	4	1	8
105	Shelly-Ann Fraser-Pryce	Jamaica	Athletics	2008–2020	Summer	F	3	4	1	8
105	Roger Ducret	France	Fencing	1920–1928	Summer	M	3	4	1	8
105	Karin Enke	East Germany	Speed skating	1980–1988	Winter	F	3	4	1	8
105	Petria Thomas	Australia	Swimming	1996–2004	Summer	F	3	4	1	8
105	Gunda Niemann-Stirnemann	Germany	Speed skating	1992–1998	Winter	F	3	4	1	8
111	Veronica Campbell-Brown	Jamaica	Athletics	2000–2016	Summer	F	3	3	2	8
112	Duncan Scott	Great Britain	Swimming	2016–2024	Summer	M	2	6	0	8
112	Shirley Babashoff	United States	Swimming	1972–1976	Summer	F	2	6	0	8
114	Regan Smith	United States	Swimming	2020–2024	Summer	F	2	5	1	8
115	Eugen Mack	Switzerland	Gymnastics	1928–1936	Summer	M	2	4	2	8
115	Susie O'Neill	Australia	Swimming	1992–2000	Summer	F	2	4	2	8
117	Dmitri Sautin	Unified Team; Russia	Diving	1992–2008	Summer	M	2	2	4	8
117	Tiril Eckhoff	Norway	Biathlon	2014–2022	Winter	F	2	2	4	8
117	Apolo Ohno	United States	Short-track speed skating	2002–2010	Winter	M	2	2	4	8
117	Margit Korondi	Hungary	Gymnastics	1952–1956	Summer	F	2	2	4	8
117	Sofia Muratova	Soviet Union	Gymnastics	1956–1960	Summer	F	2	2	4	8
122	Svetlana Romashina	Russia; ROC	Artistic swimming	2008–2020	Summer	F	7	0	0	7
123	Martin Fourcade	France	Biathlon	2010–2018	Winter	M	6	1	0	7
123	Chris Hoy	Great Britain	Cycling	2000–2012	Summer	M	6	1	0	7
125	Pál Kovács	Hungary	Fencing	1936–1960	Summer	M	6	0	1	7
125	Natalie Geisenberger	Germany	Luge	2010–2022	Winter	F	6	0	1	7
127	Yukio Endō	Japan	Gymnastics	1960–1968	Summer	M	5	2	0	7
127	Aaron Peirsol	United States	Swimming	2000–2008	Summer	M	5	2	0	7
129	Hans Günter Winkler	United Team of Germany; West Germany	Equestrian	1956–1976	Summer	M	5	1	1	7
129	Dana Vollmer	United States	Swimming	2004–2016	Summer	F	5	1	1	7
129	Wu Minxia	China	Diving	2004–2016	Summer	F	5	1	1	7
129	Krisztina Egerszegi	Hungary	Swimming	1988–1996	Summer	F	5	1	1	7
129	Tom Jager	United States	Swimming	1984–1992	Summer	M	5	1	1	7
129	Larisa Lazutina	Unified Team; Russia	Cross-country skiing	1992–1998	Winter	F	5	1	1	7
129	Clas Thunberg	Finland	Speed skating	1924–1928	Winter	M	5	1	1	7
129	Willis Augustus Lee	United States	Shooting	1920	Summer	M	5	1	1	7
137	Teddy Riner	France	Judo	2008–2024	Summer	M	5	0	2	7
138	Ivan Patzaichin	Romania	Canoeing	1968–1984	Summer	M	4	3	0	7
138	Choi Min-jeong	South Korea	Short-track speed skating	2018–2026	Winter	F	4	3	0	7
140	Einar Liberg	Norway	Shooting	1908–1924	Summer	M	4	2	1	7
140	Ivar Ballangrud	Norway	Speed skating	1928–1936	Winter	M	4	2	1	7
142	Kosuke Kitajima	Japan	Swimming	2004–2012	Summer	M	4	1	2	7
142	Libby Trickett	Australia	Swimming	2004–2012	Summer	F	4	1	2	7
142	Charles Daniels	United States	Swimming	1904–1908	Summer	M	4	1	2	7
142	Lloyd Spooner	United States	Shooting	1920	Summer	M	4	1	2	7
146	Vilhelm Carlberg	Sweden	Shooting	1908–1924	Summer	M	3	4	0	7
146	Kōhei Uchimura	Japan	Gymnastics	2008–2016	Summer	M	3	4	0	7
148	Emily Seebohm	Australia	Swimming	2008–2020	Summer	F	3	3	1	7
148	Grant Hackett	Australia	Swimming	2000–2008	Summer	M	3	3	1	7
148	Veikko Hakulinen	Finland	Cross-country skiing	1952–1960	Winter	M	3	3	1	7
148	Kati Wilhelm	Germany	Biathlon	2002–2010	Winter	F	3	3	1	7
152	Agneta Andersson	Sweden	Canoeing	1984–1996	Summer	F	3	2	2	7
152	Tarjei Bø	Norway	Biathlon	2010–2022	Winter	M	3	2	2	7
152	Eric Frenzel	Germany	Nordic combined	2010–2022	Winter	M	3	2	2	7
152	Martina Sáblíková	Czech Republic	Speed skating	2010–2022	Winter	F	3	2	2	7
152	Irena Szewińska	Poland	Athletics	1964–1976	Summer	F	3	2	2	7
152	Eero Mäntyranta	Finland	Cross-country skiing	1960–1968	Winter	M	3	2	2	7
152	Marte Olsbu Røiseland	Norway	Biathlon	2018–2022	Winter	F	3	2	2	7
152	Pieter van den Hoogenband	Netherlands	Swimming	2000–2004	Summer	M	3	2	2	7
160	Felix Gottwald	Austria	Nordic combined	2002–2010	Winter	M	3	1	3	7
160	Shirley Strickland	Australia	Athletics	1948–1956	Summer	F	3	1	3	7
160	Simona Amânar	Romania	Gymnastics	1996–2000	Summer	F	3	1	3	7
163	Marja-Liisa Kirvesniemi	Finland	Cross-country skiing	1984–1994	Winter	F	3	0	4	7
163	Yelena Välbe	Unified Team; Russia	Cross-country skiing	1992–1998	Winter	F	3	0	4	7
165	Gustavo Marzi	Italy	Fencing	1928–1936	Summer	M	2	5	0	7
165	Maria Gorokhovskaya	Soviet Union	Gymnastics	1952	Summer	F	2	5	0	7
167	Amanda Beard	United States	Swimming	1996–2004	Summer	F	2	4	1	7
167	Zoltán Halmay	Hungary	Swimming	1900–1908	Summer	M	2	4	1	7
167	Svetlana Khorkina	Russia	Gymnastics	1996–2004	Summer	F	2	4	1	7
167	Kirsty Coventry	Zimbabwe	Swimming	2004–2008	Summer	F	2	4	1	7
171	Ildikó Újlaky-Rejtő	Hungary	Fencing	1960–1976	Summer	F	2	3	2	7
171	Karin Janz	East Germany	Gymnastics	1968–1972	Summer	F	2	3	2	7
173	Pavel Lednyov	Soviet Union	Modern pentathlon	1968–1980	Summer	M	2	2	3	7
173	Andre De Grasse	Canada	Athletics	2016–2024	Summer	M	2	2	3	7
173	Manuela Di Centa	Italy	Cross-country skiing	1992–1998	Winter	F	2	2	3	7
173	Shannon Miller	United States	Gymnastics	1992–1996	Summer	F	2	2	3	7
173	Aliya Mustafina	Russia	Gymnastics	2012–2016	Summer	F	2	2	3	7
178	Andrea Ehrig-Mitscherlich	East Germany	Speed skating	1976–1988	Winter	F	1	5	1	7
178	Bogdan Musiol	East Germany; Germany	Bobsleigh	1980–1992	Summer	M	1	5	1	7
178	Dagmar Hase	Germany	Swimming	1992–1996	Summer	F	1	5	1	7
181	Denis Ablyazin	Russia; ROC	Gymnastics	2012–2020	Summer	M	1	4	2	7
181	Vladimir Smirnov	Soviet Union; Kazakhstan	Cross-country skiing	1988–1994	Winter	M	1	4	2	7
183	Masao Takemoto	Japan	Gymnastics	1952–1960	Summer	M	1	3	3	7
183	Josef Stalder	Switzerland	Gymnastics	1948–1952	Summer	M	1	3	3	7
185	Penny Oleksiak	Canada	Swimming	2016–2020	Summer	F	1	2	4	7
186	Huang Xuechen	China	Artistic swimming	2008–2020	Summer	F	0	5	2	7
187	Diana Taurasi	United States	Basketball	2004–2024	Summer	F	6	0	0	6
187	Rudolf Kárpáti	Hungary	Fencing	1948–1960	Summer	M	6	0	0	6
187	Ma Long	China	Table tennis	2012–2024	Summer	M	6	0	0	6
187	Nedo Nadi	Italy	Fencing	1912–1920	Summer	M	6	0	0	6
187	Lidiya Skoblikova	Soviet Union	Speed skating	1960–1964	Winter	F	6	0	0	6
187	Amy Van Dyken	United States	Swimming	1996–2000	Summer	F	6	0	0	6
187	Kristin Otto	East Germany	Swimming	1988	Summer	F	6	0	0	6
194	Thomas Alsgaard	Norway	Cross-country skiing	1994–2002	Winter	M	5	1	0	6
194	Laura Kenny	Great Britain	Cycling	2012–2020	Summer	F	5	1	0	6
194	Nellie Kim	Soviet Union	Gymnastics	1976–1980	Summer	F	5	1	0	6
194	Ole Lilloe-Olsen	Norway	Shooting	1920–1924	Summer	M	5	1	0	6
194	Don Schollander	United States	Swimming	1964–1968	Summer	M	5	1	0	6
194	Elaine Thompson-Herah	Jamaica	Athletics	2016–2020	Summer	F	5	1	0	6
194	Anton Heida	United States	Gymnastics	1904	Summer	M	5	1	0	6
201	Steve Redgrave	Great Britain	Rowing	1984–2000	Summer	M	5	0	1	6
201	Georgeta Damian	Romania	Rowing	2000–2008	Summer	F	5	0	1	6
201	Alfred Lane	United States	Shooting	1912–1920	Summer	M	5	0	1	6
201	Bonnie Blair	United States	Speed skating	1988–1994	Winter	F	5	0	1	6
201	Missy Franklin	United States	Swimming	2012–2016	Summer	F	5	0	1	6
201	Harrie Lavreysen	Netherlands	Cycling	2020–2024	Summer	M	5	0	1	6
201	Johnny Weissmuller	United States	Swimming; Water polo	1924–1928	Summer	M	5	0	1	6
201	Zou Kai	China	Gymnastics	2008–2012	Summer	M	5	0	1	6
209	Kevin Kuske	Germany	Bobsleigh	2002–2018	Winter	M	4	2	0	6
209	Giuseppe Delfino	Italy	Fencing	1952–1964	Summer	M	4	2	0	6
209	Jin Jong-oh	South Korea	Shooting	2004–2016	Summer	M	4	2	0	6
209	Christian d'Oriola	France	Fencing	1948–1956	Summer	M	4	2	0	6
209	Francesco Friedrich	Germany	Bobsleigh	2018–2026	Winter	M	4	2	0	6
209	Lucien Gaudin	France	Fencing	1920–1928	Summer	M	4	2	0	6
209	Jørgen Graabak	Norway	Nordic combined	2014–2022	Winter	M	4	2	0	6
209	Guo Jingjing	China	Diving	2000–2008	Summer	F	4	2	0	6
209	Matt Grevers	United States	Swimming	2008–2012	Summer	M	4	2	0	6
209	Olga Korbut	Soviet Union	Gymnastics	1972–1976	Summer	F	4	2	0	6
209	Janica Kostelić	Croatia	Alpine skiing	2002–2006	Winter	F	4	2	0	6
220	Charles Hamelin	Canada	Short-track speed skating	2006–2022	Winter	M	4	1	1	6
220	Doina Ignat	Romania	Rowing	1992–2008	Summer	F	4	1	1	6
220	Elena Belova	Soviet Union	Fencing	1968–1980	Summer	F	4	1	1	6
220	Therese Johaug	Norway	Cross-country skiing	2010–2022	Winter	F	4	1	1	6
220	Kim Soo-nyung	South Korea	Archery	1988–2000	Summer	F	4	1	1	6
220	Viktor Sidyak	Soviet Union	Fencing	1968–1980	Summer	M	4	1	1	6
220	Katrin Wagner-Augustin	Germany	Canoeing	2000–2012	Summer	F	4	1	1	6
220	Darya Domracheva	Belarus	Biathlon	2010–2018	Winter	F	4	1	1	6
220	Murray Rose	Australia	Swimming	1956–1960	Summer	M	4	1	1	6
220	Gunde Svan	Sweden	Cross-country skiing	1984–1988	Winter	M	4	1	1	6
220	Leontien van Moorsel	Netherlands	Cycling	2000–2004	Summer	F	4	1	1	6
220	Wang Meng	China	Short-track speed skating	2006–2010	Winter	F	4	1	1	6
232	Győző Kulcsár	Hungary	Fencing	1964–1976	Summer	M	4	0	2	6
233	James Guy	Great Britain	Swimming	2016–2024	Summer	M	3	3	0	6
233	Anastasiya Kuzmina	Slovakia	Biathlon	2010–2018	Winter	F	3	3	0	6
233	Adam Peaty	Great Britain	Swimming	2016–2024	Summer	M	3	3	0	6
233	Eileen Gu	China	Freestyle skiing	2022–2026	Winter	F	3	3	0	6
233	Torri Huske	United States	Swimming	2020–2024	Summer	F	3	3	0	6
233	Andrea Pollack	East Germany	Swimming	1976–1980	Summer	F	3	3	0	6
233	Rebecca Soni	United States	Swimming	2008–2012	Summer	F	3	3	0	6
240	Andrew Hoy	Australia	Equestrian	1992–2020	Summer	M	3	2	1	6
240	Halvard Hanevold	Norway	Biathlon	1998–2010	Winter	M	3	2	1	6
240	Vladimir Nazlymov	Soviet Union	Fencing	1968–1980	Summer	M	3	2	1	6
240	Yuliya Chepalova	Russia	Cross-country skiing	1998–2006	Winter	F	3	2	1	6
240	Natasa Dusev-Janics	Hungary	Canoeing	2004–2012	Summer	F	3	2	1	6
240	Knut Holmann	Norway	Canoeing	1992–2000	Summer	M	3	2	1	6
240	Lilly King	United States	Swimming	2016–2024	Summer	F	3	2	1	6
240	Ralph Rose	United States	Athletics	1904–1912	Summer	M	3	2	1	6
240	Sarah Sjöström	Sweden	Swimming	2016–2024	Summer	F	3	2	1	6
240	Vegard Ulvang	Norway	Cross-country skiing	1988–1994	Winter	M	3	2	1	6
240	Michael Groß	West Germany	Swimming	1984–1988	Summer	M	3	2	1	6
240	Aly Raisman	United States	Gymnastics	2012–2016	Summer	F	3	2	1	6
240	Renate Stecher	East Germany	Athletics	1972–1976	Summer	F	3	2	1	6
240	Sun Yang	China	Swimming	2012–2016	Summer	M	3	2	1	6
240	George Eyser	United States	Gymnastics	1904	Summer	M	3	2	1	6
240	Li Ning	China	Gymnastics	1984	Summer	M	3	2	1	6
240	Daniela Silivaș	Romania	Gymnastics	1988	Summer	F	3	2	1	6
240	Hermann Weingärtner	Germany	Gymnastics	1896	Summer	M	3	2	1	6
258	Kim Rhode	United States	Shooting	1996–2016	Summer	F	3	1	2	6
258	Alfred Schwarzmann	Germany	Gymnastics	1936–1952	Summer	M	3	1	2	6
258	Jessica Fox	Australia	Canoeing	2012–2024	Summer	F	3	1	2	6
258	Jackie Joyner-Kersee	United States	Athletics	1984–1996	Summer	F	3	1	2	6
258	Leon Štukelj	Yugoslavia	Gymnastics	1924–1936	Summer	M	3	1	2	6
258	Oscar Swahn	Sweden	Shooting	1908–1920	Summer	M	3	1	2	6
258	Charlotte Dujardin	Great Britain	Equestrian	2012–2020	Summer	F	3	1	2	6
258	Johan Grøttumsbråten	Norway	Cross-country skiing Nordic combined	1924–1932	Winter	M	3	1	2	6
258	Brendan Hansen	United States	Swimming	2004–2012	Summer	M	3	1	2	6
258	Suzanne Schulting	Netherlands	Short-track speed skating	2018–2022	Winter	F	3	1	2	6
258	Konrad Frey	Germany	Gymnastics	1936	Summer	M	3	1	2	6
269	Kaillie Humphries	Canada; United States	Bobsleigh	2010–2026	Winter	F	3	0	3	6
269	Tirunesh Dibaba	Ethiopia	Athletics	2004–2016	Summer	F	3	0	3	6
269	Max Whitlock	Great Britain	Gymnastics	2012–2020	Summer	M	3	0	3	6
269	Sifan Hassan	Netherlands	Athletics	2020–2024	Summer	M	3	0	3	6
269	Rüdiger Helm	East Germany	Canoeing	1976–1980	Summer	M	3	0	3	6
269	Angel Martino	United States	Swimming	1992–1996	Summer	F	3	0	3	6
275	Michael Plumb	United States	Equestrian	1964–1984	Summer	M	2	4	0	6
276	Wang Yifu	China	Shooting	1984–2004	Summer	M	2	3	1	6
276	Sergei Tchepikov	Soviet Union; Unified Team; Russia	Biathlon	1988–2006	Winter	M	2	3	1	6
276	Georges Buchard	France	Fencing	1924–1936	Summer	M	2	3	1	6
276	Veronica Cochela	Romania	Rowing	1988–2000	Summer	F	2	3	1	6
276	Albert Helgerud	Norway	Shooting	1908–1920	Summer	M	2	3	1	6
276	Rita Kőbán	Hungary	Canoeing	1988–2000	Summer	F	2	3	1	6
276	Lee Seung-hoon	South Korea	Speed skating	2010–2022	Winter	M	2	3	1	6
276	Claudia Nystad	Germany	Cross-country skiing	2002–2014	Winter	F	2	3	1	6
276	Wolfgang Hoppe	East Germany; Germany	Bobsleigh	1984–1994	Winter	M	2	3	1	6
276	Tamara Csipes	Hungary	Canoeing	2016–2024	Summer	F	2	3	1	6
276	Michael Klim	Australia	Swimming	1996–2004	Summer	M	2	3	1	6
276	Tamara Manina	Soviet Union	Gymnastics	1956–1964	Summer	F	2	3	1	6
276	Simone Manuel	United States	Swimming	2016–2024	Summer	F	2	3	1	6
276	Abbey Weitzeil	United States	Swimming	2016–2024	Summer	F	2	3	1	6
276	Rebeca Andrade	Brazil	Gymnastics	2020–2024	Summer	F	2	3	1	6
276	Li Xiaoshuang	China	Gymnastics	1992–1996	Summer	M	2	3	1	6
276	Jonna Sundling	Sweden	Cross-country skiing	2022–2026	Winter	F	2	3	1	6
276	Shuji Tsurumi	Japan	Gymnastics	1960–1964	Summer	M	2	3	1	6
276	Burton Downing	United States	Cycling	1904	Summer	M	2	3	1	6
295	Eugenio Monti	Italy	Bobsleigh	1956–1968	Winter	M	2	2	2	6
295	Josef Neckermann	United Team of Germany; West Germany	Equestrian	1960–1972	Summer	M	2	2	2	6
295	Philippe Riboud	France	Fencing	1980–1988	Summer	M	2	2	2	6
295	Robert Garrett	United States	Athletics	1896–1900	Summer	M	2	2	2	6
299	Mark Todd	New Zealand	Equestrian	1984–2012	Summer	M	2	1	3	6
299	Armin Zöggeler	Italy	Luge	1994–2014	Winter	M	2	1	3	6
299	Olga Kharlan	Ukraine	Fencing	2008–2024	Summer	F	2	1	3	6
299	Anna Meares	Australia	Cycling	2004–2016	Summer	F	2	1	3	6
299	Johan Olsson	Sweden	Cross-country skiing	2006–2014	Winter	M	2	1	3	6
299	Daniela Hunger	East Germany; Germany	Swimming	1988–1992	Summer	F	2	1	3	6
299	Sunisa Lee	United States	Gymnastics	2020–2024	Summer	F	2	1	3	6
299	Lavinia Miloșovici	Romania	Gymnastics	1992–1996	Summer	F	2	1	3	6
307	Ebba Andersson	Sweden	Cross-country skiing	2018–2026	Winter	F	1	4	1	6
307	Kateřina Neumannová	Czech Republic	Cross-country skiing	1998–2006	Winter	F	1	4	1	6
307	Hrihoriy Misyutin	Unified Team; Ukraine	Gymnastics	1992–1996	Summer	M	1	4	1	6
310	Elana Meyers Taylor	United States	Bobsleigh	2010–2026	Winter	F	1	3	2	6
310	Florent Manaudou	France	Swimming	2012–2024	Summer	M	1	3	2	6
310	Bode Miller	United States	Alpine skiing	2002–2014	Winter	M	1	3	2	6
310	Olga Tass	Hungary	Gymnastics	1948–1956	Summer	F	1	3	2	6
310	Sturla Holm Lægreid	Norway	Biathlon	2022–2026	Winter	M	1	3	2	6
315	Raimondo D'Inzeo	Italy	Equestrian	1956–1972	Summer	M	1	2	3	6
315	Pavel Kolobkov	Soviet Union; Unified Team; Russia	Fencing	1988–2004	Summer	M	1	2	3	6
315	Antoinette Rijpma-de Jong	Netherlands	Speed skating	2018–2026	Winter	F	1	2	3	6
315	Cindy Klassen	Canada	Speed skating	2002–2006	Winter	F	1	2	3	6
315	Yang Junxuan	China	Swimming	2020–2024	Summer	F	1	2	3	6
320	Clara Hughes	Canada	Cycling; Speed skating	1996–2010	Summer; Winter	F	1	1	4	6
320	Anja Pärson	Sweden	Alpine skiing	2002–2010	Winter	F	1	1	4	6
320	Mika Myllylä	Finland	Cross-country skiing	1994–1998	Winter	M	1	1	4	6
323	Daniel Revenu	France	Fencing	1964–1976	Summer	M	1	0	5	6
324	László Cseh	Hungary	Swimming	2004–2016	Summer	M	0	4	2	6
325	Frank Beaurepaire	Australasia; Australia	Swimming	1908–1924	Summer	M	0	3	3	6
326	Piero D'Inzeo	Italy	Equestrian	1956–1972	Summer	M	0	2	4	6
326	Dimitrij Ovtcharov	Germany	Table tennis	2008–2020	Summer	M	0	2	4	6
326	Rintje Ritsma	Netherlands	Speed skating	1994–2006	Winter	M	0	2	4	6
326	Roald Larsen	Norway	Speed skating	1924–1928	Winter	M	0	2	4	6
330	Harri Kirvesniemi	Finland	Cross-country skiing	1980–1998	Winter	M	0	0	6	6

=== Timeline ===
This is a progressive list of Olympians that have held the record for most medals won. Medals won in the 1906 Intercalated Games are not included. It includes top-three placings in 1896 and 1900, before medals were awarded for top-three placings. All record-holders have competed at Summer Games rather than Winter Games.

Medal count	Date	Athlete	Nation	Sport	Record medal event	Earlier medal events
1	6 April 1896	James Connolly	United States	Athletics	Triple jump G	–
1	6 April 1896	Alexandre Tuffère	France	Athletics	Triple jump S	–
1	6 April 1896	Ioannis Persakis	Greece	Athletics	Triple jump B	–
1	6 April 1896	Robert Garrett	United States	Athletics	Discus G	–
1	6 April 1896	Panagiotis Paraskevopoulos	Greece	Athletics	Discus S	–
1	6 April 1896	Sotirios Versis	Greece	Athletics	Discus B	–
2	7 April 1896	Robert Garrett	United States	Athletics	Long jump S	See above
2	7 April 1896	James Connolly	United States	Athletics	Long jump B	See above
3	7 April 1896	Robert Garrett	United States	Athletics	Shot put G	1896 – 1 G, 2 S
3	9 April 1896	Carl Schuhmann	Germany	Gymnastics	Vault G	1896 – 1 G, 2 G
3	9 April 1896	Hermann Weingärtner	Germany	Gymnastics	Vault B	1896 – 1 G, 2 G
4	9 April 1896	Hermann Weingärtner	Germany	Gymnastics	Pommel horse S	1896 – 1 G, 2 G
5	9 April 1896	Hermann Weingärtner	Germany	Gymnastics	Rings S	1896 – 1 G, 2 G
6	9 April 1896	Hermann Weingärtner	Germany	Gymnastics	Horizontal bar G	1896 – 1 G, 2 G
6	16 July 1900	Robert Garrett	United States	Athletics	Standing triple jump B	1896 – 1 G, 2 S, 3 G, 4 S 1900 – 5 B
6	3 September 1904	Ray Ewry	United States	Athletics	Standing triple jump G	1900 – 1 G, 2 G, 3 G 1904 – 4 G, 5 G
7	20 July 1908	Ray Ewry	United States	Athletics	Standing long jump G	1900 – 1 G, 2 G, 3 G 1904 – 4 G, 5 G
8	23 July 1908	Ray Ewry	United States	Athletics	Standing high jump G	1900 – 1 G, 2 G, 3 G 1904 – 4 G, 5 G
8	29 July 1920	Carl Osburn	United States	Shooting	Team 300 m / 600 m military rifle, prone G	1912 – 1 B, 2 S, 3 S, 4 G 1920 – 5 B, 6 S, 7 G
9	30 July 1920	Carl Osburn	United States	Shooting	300 m military rifle, standing G	1912 – 1 B, 2 S, 3 S, 4 G 1920 – 5 B, 6 S, 7 G
10	31 July 1920	Carl Osburn	United States	Shooting	Team free rifle G	1912 – 1 B, 2 S, 3 S, 4 G 1920 – 5 B, 6 S, 7 G
11	27 June 1924	Carl Osburn	United States	Shooting	600 m free rifle S	1912 – 1 B, 2 S, 3 S, 4 G 1920 – 5 B, 6 S, 7 G
11	3 August 1928	Paavo Nurmi	Finland	Athletics	5000 m S	1920 – 1 S, 2 G, 3 G, 4 G 1924 – 5 G, 6 G, 7 G, 8 G, 9 G 1928 – 10 G
12	4 August 1928	Paavo Nurmi	Finland	Athletics	3000 m steeplechase S	1920 – 1 S, 2 G, 3 G, 4 G 1924 – 5 G, 6 G, 7 G, 8 G, 9 G 1928 – 10 G
12	2 September 1960	Edoardo Mangiarotti	Italy	Fencing	Team foil S	1936 – 1 G 1948 – 2 S, 3 S, 4 B 1952 – 5 S, 6 S, 7 G, 8 G 1956 – 9 G, 10 G, 11 B
13	9 September 1960	Edoardo Mangiarotti	Italy	Fencing	Team épée G	1936 – 1 G 1948 – 2 S, 3 S, 4 B 1952 – 5 S, 6 S, 7 G, 8 G 1956 – 9 G, 10 G, 11 B
13	21 October 1964	Larisa Latynina	Soviet Union	Gymnastics	Team G	1956 – 1 G, 2 B, 3 G, 4 G, 5 G, 6 S 1960 – 7 G, 8 G, 9 S, 10 S, 11 B, 12 G
14	21 October 1964	Larisa Latynina	Soviet Union	Gymnastics	All-around S	1956 – 1 G, 2 B, 3 G, 4 G, 5 G, 6 S 1960 – 7 G, 8 G, 9 S, 10 S, 11 B, 12 G
15	22 October 1964	Larisa Latynina	Soviet Union	Gymnastics	Vault S	1956 – 1 G, 2 B, 3 G, 4 G, 5 G, 6 S 1960 – 7 G, 8 G, 9 S, 10 S, 11 B, 12 G
16	22 October 1964	Larisa Latynina	Soviet Union	Gymnastics	Uneven bars B	1956 – 1 G, 2 B, 3 G, 4 G, 5 G, 6 S 1960 – 7 G, 8 G, 9 S, 10 S, 11 B, 12 G
17	23 October 1964	Larisa Latynina	Soviet Union	Gymnastics	Balance beam B	1956 – 1 G, 2 B, 3 G, 4 G, 5 G, 6 S 1960 – 7 G, 8 G, 9 S, 10 S, 11 B, 12 G
18	23 October 1964	Larisa Latynina	Soviet Union	Gymnastics	Floor exercise G	1956 – 1 G, 2 B, 3 G, 4 G, 5 G, 6 S 1960 – 7 G, 8 G, 9 S, 10 S, 11 B, 12 G
18	31 July 2012	Michael Phelps	United States	Swimming	200 m butterfly S	2004 – 1 G, 2 B, 3 B, 4 G, 5 G, 6 G, 7 G, 8 G 2008 – 9 G, 10 G, 11 G, 12 G, 13 G, 14 G, 15 G, 16 G 2012 – 17 S
19	31 July 2012	Michael Phelps	United States	Swimming	4 × 200 m freestyle G	2004 – 1 G, 2 B, 3 B, 4 G, 5 G, 6 G, 7 G, 8 G 2008 – 9 G, 10 G, 11 G, 12 G, 13 G, 14 G, 15 G, 16 G 2012 – 17 S
20	2 August 2012	Michael Phelps	United States	Swimming	200 m individual medley G	2004 – 1 G, 2 B, 3 B, 4 G, 5 G, 6 G, 7 G, 8 G 2008 – 9 G, 10 G, 11 G, 12 G, 13 G, 14 G, 15 G, 16 G 2012 – 17 S
21	3 August 2012	Michael Phelps	United States	Swimming	100 m butterfly G	2004 – 1 G, 2 B, 3 B, 4 G, 5 G, 6 G, 7 G, 8 G 2008 – 9 G, 10 G, 11 G, 12 G, 13 G, 14 G, 15 G, 16 G 2012 – 17 S
22	4 August 2012	Michael Phelps	United States	Swimming	4 × 100 m medley relay G	2004 – 1 G, 2 B, 3 B, 4 G, 5 G, 6 G, 7 G, 8 G 2008 – 9 G, 10 G, 11 G, 12 G, 13 G, 14 G, 15 G, 16 G 2012 – 17 S
23	7 August 2016	Michael Phelps	United States	Swimming	4 × 100 m freestyle relay G	2004 – 1 G, 2 B, 3 B, 4 G, 5 G, 6 G, 7 G, 8 G 2008 – 9 G, 10 G, 11 G, 12 G, 13 G, 14 G, 15 G, 16 G 2012 – 17 S
24	9 August 2016	Michael Phelps	United States	Swimming	200 m butterfly G	2004 – 1 G, 2 B, 3 B, 4 G, 5 G, 6 G, 7 G, 8 G 2008 – 9 G, 10 G, 11 G, 12 G, 13 G, 14 G, 15 G, 16 G 2012 – 17 S
25	9 August 2016	Michael Phelps	United States	Swimming	4 × 200 m freestyle relay G	2004 – 1 G, 2 B, 3 B, 4 G, 5 G, 6 G, 7 G, 8 G 2008 – 9 G, 10 G, 11 G, 12 G, 13 G, 14 G, 15 G, 16 G 2012 – 17 S
26	11 August 2016	Michael Phelps	United States	Swimming	200 m individual medley G	2004 – 1 G, 2 B, 3 B, 4 G, 5 G, 6 G, 7 G, 8 G 2008 – 9 G, 10 G, 11 G, 12 G, 13 G, 14 G, 15 G, 16 G 2012 – 17 S
27	12 August 2016	Michael Phelps	United States	Swimming	100 m butterfly S	2004 – 1 G, 2 B, 3 B, 4 G, 5 G, 6 G, 7 G, 8 G 2008 – 9 G, 10 G, 11 G, 12 G, 13 G, 14 G, 15 G, 16 G 2012 – 17 S
28	13 August 2016	Michael Phelps	United States	Swimming	4 × 100 m medley relay G	2004 – 1 G, 2 B, 3 B, 4 G, 5 G, 6 G, 7 G, 8 G 2008 – 9 G, 10 G, 11 G, 12 G, 13 G, 14 G, 15 G, 16 G 2012 – 17 S

Legend: G = Gold, S = Silver, B = Bronze

== List of most career medals in individual events ==
This list contains only medals won in individual events, so no relays or team events count for this section.

No.	Athlete	Nation	Sport	Years	Games	Sex	Gold	Silver	Bronze	Total
1	Michael Phelps	United States	Swimming	2004–2016	Summer	M	13	2	1	16
2	Larisa Latynina	Soviet Union	Gymnastics	1956–1964	Summer	F	6	5	3	14
3	Nikolai Andrianov	Soviet Union	Gymnastics	1972–1980	Summer	M	6	3	3	12
4	Katie Ledecky	United States	Swimming	2012–2024	Summer	F	9	4	1	15
5	Boris Shakhlin	Soviet Union	Gymnastics	1956–1964	Summer	M	6	2	2	15
6	Ireen Wüst	Netherlands	Speed skating	2006–2022	Winter	F	5	4	1	15
7	Marit Bjørgen	Norway	Cross-country skiing	2002–2018	Winter	F	5	3	2	15
8	Takashi Ono	Japan	Gymnastics	1952–1964	Summer	M	3	3	4	15
9	Alexei Nemov	Russia	Gymnastics	1996–2000	Summer	M	3	2	5	15
10	Paavo Nurmi	Finland	Athletics	1920–1928	Summer	M	6	3	0	9
10	Bjørn Dæhlie	Norway	Cross-country skiing	1992–1998	Winter	M	6	3	0	9
12	Viktor Chukarin	Soviet Union	Gymnastics	1952–1956	Summer	M	5	3	1	9
12	Sawao Katō	Japan	Gymnastics	1968–1976	Summer	M	5	3	1	9
12	Ole Einar Bjørndalen	Norway	Biathlon	1998–2014	Winter	M	5	3	1	9
15	Vitaly Scherbo	Unified Team; Belarus	Gymnastics	1992–1996	Summer	M	5	0	4	9
16	Ray Ewry	United States	Athletics	1900–1908	Summer	M	8	0	0	8
17	Věra Čáslavská	Czechoslovakia	Gymnastics	1960–1968	Summer	F	7	1	0	8
17	Carl Lewis	United States	Athletics	1984–1996	Summer	M	7	1	0	8
19	Simone Biles	United States	Gymnastics	2016–2024	Summer	F	5	1	2	8
20	Akinori Nakayama	Japan	Gymnastics	1968–1972	Summer	M	4	2	2	8
20	Kjetil André Aamodt	Norway	Alpine skiing	1992–2006	Winter	M	4	2	2	8
20	Claudia Pechstein	Germany	Speed skating	1992–2006	Winter	F	4	2	2	8
23	Karin Enke	East Germany	Speed skating	1980–1988	Winter	F	3	4	1	8
23	Gunda Niemann-Stirnemann	Germany	Speed skating	1992–1998	Winter	F	3	4	1	8
25	Alexander Dityatin	Soviet Union	Gymnastics	1976–1980	Summer	M	2	5	1	8
26	Arianna Fontana	Italy	Short-track speed skating	2006–2026	Winter	F	2	3	3	8
27	Johannes Høsflot Klæbo	Norway	Cross-country skiing	2018–2026	Winter	M	6	0	1	7
28	Clas Thunberg	Finland	Speed skating	1924–1928	Winter	M	5	1	1	7
28	Gert Fredriksson	Sweden	Canoeing	1948–1960	Summer	M	5	1	1	7
28	Nadia Comăneci	Romania	Gymnastics	1976–1980	Summer	F	5	1	1	7
28	Krisztina Egerszegi	Hungary	Swimming	1988–1996	Summer	F	5	1	1	7
32	Lyubov Yegorova	Unified Team; Russia	Cross-country skiing	1992–1994	Winter	F	4	3	0	7
33	Ivar Ballangrud	Norway	Speed skating	1928–1936	Winter	M	4	2	1	7
34	Sixten Jernberg	Sweden	Cross-country skiing	1956–1964	Winter	M	3	3	1	7
35	Mikhail Voronin	Soviet Union	Gymnastics	1968–1972	Summer	M	2	4	1	7
35	Raisa Smetanina	Soviet Union; Unified Team	Cross-country skiing	1976–1992	Winter	F	2	4	1	7
35	Kirsty Coventry	Zimbabwe	Swimming	2004–2008	Summer	F	2	4	1	7
38	Stefania Belmondo	Italy	Cross-country skiing	1992–2002	Winter	F	2	3	2	7
39	Ryan Lochte	United States	Swimming	2004–2012	Summer	M	2	2	3	7
40	Andrea Ehrig-Mitscherlich	East Germany	Speed skating	1976–1988	Winter	F	1	5	1	7
41	Miho Takagi	Japan	Speed skating	2018–2026	Winter	F	1	3	3	7
42	Merlene Ottey	Jamaica	Athletics	1980–2000	Summer	F	0	2	5	7

== Athletes with medals in different disciplines ==
=== In the Summer and Winter Games ===
Athlete (Nation)	Summer Games			Winter Games			Ref
Athlete (Nation)	Year	Medal	Event	Year	Medal	Event	Ref
Eddie Eagan (USA)	1920 Antwerp	Gold	Boxing (light heavyweight)	1932 Lake Placid	Gold	Bobsleigh (four-man)	
Jacob Tullin Thams (NOR)	1936 Berlin	Silver	Sailing (8-metre)	1924 Chamonix	Gold	Ski jumping (individual large hill)	
Christa Luding-Rothenburger (GDR)	1988 Seoul	Silver	Cycling (sprint)	1984 Sarajevo	Gold	Speed skating (500 m)	
Christa Luding-Rothenburger (GDR)	1988 Seoul	Silver	Cycling (sprint)	1988 Calgary	Gold	Speed skating (1000 m)	
Christa Luding-Rothenburger (GDR)	1988 Seoul	Silver	Cycling (sprint)	1988 Calgary	Silver	Speed skating (500 m)	
Christa Luding-Rothenburger (GDR)	1988 Seoul	Silver	Cycling (sprint)	1992 Albertville	Bronze	Speed skating (500 m)	
Clara Hughes (CAN)	1996 Atlanta	Bronze	Cycling (road race)	2002 Salt Lake City	Bronze	Speed skating (5000 m)	
Clara Hughes (CAN)	1996 Atlanta	Bronze	Cycling (road race)	2006 Turin	Silver	Speed skating (team pursuit)	
Clara Hughes (CAN)	1996 Atlanta	Bronze	Cycling (time trial)	2006 Turin	Gold	Speed skating (5000 m)	
Clara Hughes (CAN)	1996 Atlanta	Bronze	Cycling (time trial)	2010 Vancouver	Bronze	Speed skating (5000 m)	
Lauryn Williams (USA)	2004 Athens	Silver	Athletics (100 m)	2014 Sochi	Silver	Bobsleigh (two-woman)	
Lauryn Williams (USA)	2012 London	Gold	Athletics (4 × 100 m relay)	2014 Sochi	Silver	Bobsleigh (two-woman)	
Eddy Alvarez (USA)	2020 Tokyo	Silver	Baseball	2014 Sochi	Silver	Short-track speed skating (5000 m relay)	
Alexandra Burghardt (GER)	2024 Paris	Bronze	Athletics (4 × 100 m relay)	2022 Beijing	Silver	Bobsleigh (two-woman)	

- Gillis Grafström became the first person to win a medal in the same event in Summer and Winter Olympics, winning figure skating golds at the 1920 Olympics and at the first Winter Olympics in 1924.
- Eddie Eagan became the first person to win a medal in the Winter Olympics and in the Summer Olympics in different events. He is the only Summer and Winter medalist to win gold medals in different events.
- Christa Luding-Rothenburger is the only person to win medals at the Winter and Summer Games in the same year. (This feat is no longer possible due to the staggering of the Winter and Summer Olympic years). She is also the first person to win medals in successive Winter and Summer Games or vice versa.
- Clara Hughes is the first person to win multiple medals in both Summer and Winter Games and holds the highest number of medals of any Olympian to win medals in both the Summer and Winter Games.

=== In the Summer Games ===
==== Swimming and water polo ====
- Paul Radmilovic (GBR)
- Johnny Weissmuller (USA)
- Gérard Blitz (BEL)
- Tim Shaw (USA)

==== Others in Summer Games ====
- Morris Kirksey (USA) (athletics and rugby)
- Edwin Flack (AUS) (athletics and tennis)
- Karch Kiraly (USA) (indoor volleyball and beach volleyball)
- Otto Herschmann (AUT) (swimming and fencing)
- (German Empire) Carl Schuhmann (GER) (gymnastics and wrestling)
- Rebecca Romero (GBR) (cycling and rowing)
- Roswitha Krause (GER) (swimming and handball)
- Walter W. Winans (USA) (shooting and sculpture)
- Alfréd Hajós (HUN) (swimming and architecture)
- Conn Findlay (USA) (rowing and sailing)
- Magnus Wegelius (FIN) (gymnastics and shooting)
- Veli Nieminen (FIN) (gymnastics and shooting)
- Daniel Norling (SWE) (gymnastics and equestrian)
- (German Empire) Fritz Hofmann (GER) (gymnastics and athletics)
- Oswald Holmberg (SWE) (gymnastics and tug of war). But one of these at the unofficial 1906 Summer Olympics
- Gustaf Dyrssen (SWE) (modern pentathlon and fencing)

=== In the Winter Games ===
==== Cross-country skiing and Nordic combined ====
- Thorleif Haug (NOR)
- Johan Grøttumsbråten (NOR)
- Thoralf Strømstad (NOR)
- Oddbjørn Hagen (NOR)
- Heikki Hasu (FIN)

==== Others in Winter Games ====
- Anfisa Reztsova (URS) (biathlon and cross-country skiing)
- Susi Erdmann (GER) (luge and bobsleigh)
- Gerda Weissensteiner (ITA) (luge and bobsleigh)
- Eric Flaim (USA) (long track speed skating and short-track speed skating)
- Jorien ter Mors (NED) (long track speed skating and short-track speed skating)
- Ester Ledecká (CZE) (alpine skiing and snowboarding)
- Valérie Maltais (CAN) (long track speed skating and short-track speed skating)

== See also ==
- List of multiple Olympic medalists at a single Games
- List of multiple Olympic medalists in one event
- List of multiple Olympic gold medalists
- List of multiple Olympic gold medalists at a single Games
- List of multiple Olympic gold medalists in one event
- List of multiple Summer Olympic medalists
- List of multiple Winter Olympic medalists
- List of athletes with the most appearances at Olympic Games
- All-time Olympic Games medal table
- Leonidas of Rhodes
