= United States at the 1896 Summer Olympics =

- Flag of the United States
- IOC code: USA
- NOC: United States Olympic Committee

in Athens, Greece April 15, 1896
- Competitors: 14 in 3 sports and 16 events
- Medals Ranked 1st: Gold 11 Silver 7 Bronze 2 Total 20

Summer Olympics appearances (overview)
- 1896; 1900; 1904; 1908; 1912; 1920; 1924; 1928; 1932; 1936; 1948; 1952; 1956; 1960; 1964; 1968; 1972; 1976; 1980; 1984; 1988; 1992; 1996; 2000; 2004; 2008; 2012; 2016; 2020; 2024; 2028

Other related appearances
- 1906 Intercalated Games

Fourteen competitors from the United States competed in three sports at the 1896 Summer Olympics in Athens, Greece. The Americans were the most successful athletes in terms of gold medals, beating host nation Greece, 11 to 10, despite fielding only 14 competitors compared to an estimated 169 Greek entrants. However, the Greeks' 46 total medals dwarfed the Americans' 20.

The United States team had 27 entries in 16 events, with 20 of the 27 resulting in top-three finishes.

Most of the American competitors were students at Harvard University or Princeton University or members of the Boston Athletic Association. The team trained at The Pennington School, in Pennington, New Jersey, while preparing for the first modern Olympic Games.

== Medalists ==
Of the 14 Americans at the Athens Games, 12 won medals. Charles Waldstein, a shooter, and Gardner Williams, a swimmer, were the two who did not win any medals. The following competitors won medals at the games. In the discipline sections below, the medalists' names are bolded.

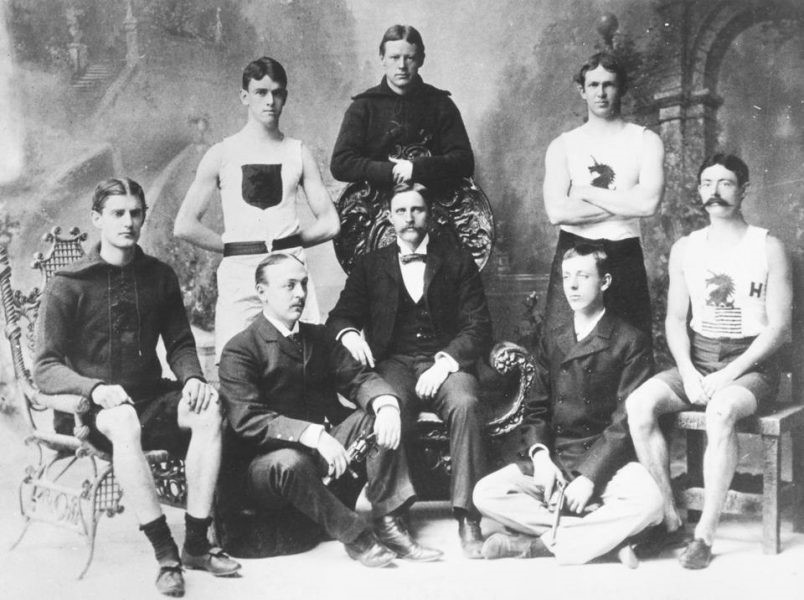
Several members of America's first Olympic team in 1896. Standing: T.E. Burke, Thomas P. Curtis, Ellery H. Clark. Seated: W.W. Hoyt, Sumner Paine, Trainer John Graham, John B. Paine, Arthur C. Blake

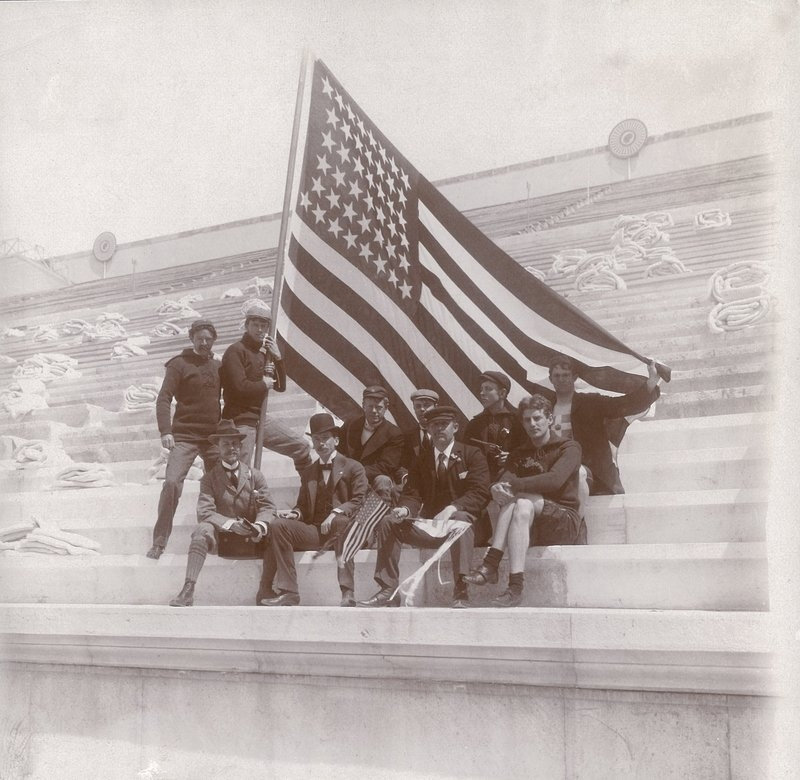
Several members of America's first Olympic team

Medal	Name	Sport	Event	Date
Gold	James Connolly	Athletics	Men's triple jump	April 6
Gold	Robert Garrett	Athletics	Men's discus throw	April 6
Gold	Robert Garrett	Athletics	Men's shot put	April 7
Gold	Ellery Clark	Athletics	Men's long jump	April 7
Gold	Thomas Burke	Athletics	Men's 400 metres	April 7
Gold	Thomas Burke	Athletics	Men's 100 metres	April 10
Gold	Thomas Curtis	Athletics	Men's 110 metre hurdles	April 10
Gold	Ellery Clark	Athletics	Men's high jump	April 10
Gold	William Hoyt	Athletics	Men's pole vault	April 10
Gold	John Paine	Shooting	Men's 25 metre military pistol	April 10
Gold	Sumner Paine	Shooting	Men's 30 metre free pistol	April 11
Silver	Herbert Jamison	Athletics	Men's 400 metres	April 7
Silver	Arthur Blake	Athletics	Men's 1500 metres	April 7
Silver	Robert Garrett	Athletics	Men's long jump	April 7
Silver	James Connolly	Athletics	Men's high jump	April 10
Silver	Robert Garrett	Athletics	Men's high jump	April 10
Silver	Albert Tyler	Athletics	Men's pole vault	April 10
Silver	Sumner Paine	Shooting	Men's 25 metre military pistol	April 10
Bronze	James Connolly	Athletics	Men's long jump	April 7
Bronze	Francis Lane	Athletics	Men's 100 metres	April 10

Medals by sport
Sport	1st place, gold medalist(s)	2nd place, silver medalist(s)	3rd place, bronze medalist(s)	Total
Athletics	9	6	2	**17**
Shooting	2	1	0	**3**
Total	11	7	2	20

=== Multiple medalists ===
The following competitors won multiple medals at the 1896 Olympic Games.

Name	Medal	Sport	Event
Robert Garrett	Gold; Gold; Silver; Silver	Athletics	Men's shot put Men's discus throw Men's high jump Men's long jump
Thomas Burke	Gold; Gold	Athletics	Men's 100 m Men's 400 m
Ellery Clark	Gold; Gold	Athletics	Men's high jump Men's long jump
James Connolly	Gold; Silver; Bronze	Athletics	Men's triple jump Men's high jump Men's long jump
Sumner Paine	Gold; Silver	Shooting	Men's 30 metre pistol Men's 25 metre military pistol

== Competitors ==
The following is the list of number of competitors in the Games.

Sport	Men	Women	Total
Athletics	10	0	10
Shooting	3	0	3
Swimming	1	0	1
Total	14	0	14

Medals by day
Day	Date	1st place, gold medalist(s)	2nd place, silver medalist(s)	3rd place, bronze medalist(s)	Total
1	April 6	2	0	0	2
2	April 7	3	3	1	7
3	April 8	0	0	0	0
4	April 9	0	0	0	0
5	April 10	5	4	1	10
6	April 11	1	0	0	1
7	April 12	2	1	0	3
8	April 13	0	0	0	0
Total		11	7	2	20

== Athletics ==
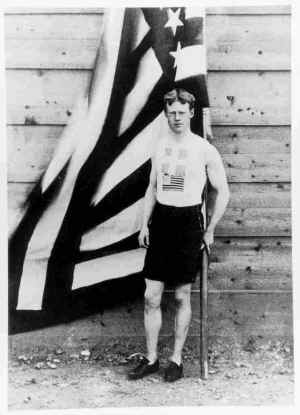
Thomas Curtis

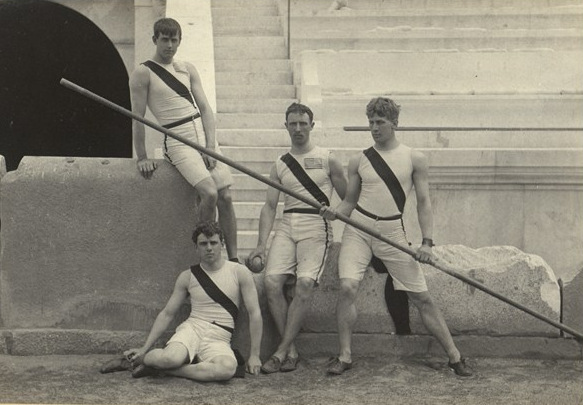
US athletic team

The United States squad of 11, which featured only one national champion, won nine gold medals in the twelve athletics events, with contributions from six different athletes. Six silver medals and two bronze medals also went to the Americans in athletics.

Track & road events

Athlete	Event	Heat		Final	
Athlete	Event	Time	Rank	Time	Rank
Thomas Burke	100 m	11.8 OR	1 Q	12.0	1st place, gold medalist(s)
Thomas Curtis	100 m	12.2	1 Q	DNS	
Ralph Derr	100 m	DNS		Did not advance	
Francis Lane	100 m	12.2	1 Q	12.6	3rd place, bronze medalist(s)
Charles Vanoni	100 m	DNS		Did not advance	
Thomas Burke	400 m	58.4	1 Q	54.2 OR	1st place, gold medalist(s)
Herbert Jamison	400 m	56.8	1 Q	55.2	2nd place, silver medalist(s)
Thomas Burke	800 m	DNS		Did not advance	
Arthur Blake	1500 m	—N/a		4:33.6	2nd place, silver medalist(s)
James Brendan Connolly	110 m hurdles	DNS		Did not advance	
Thomas Curtis	110 m hurdles	18.0	1 Q	17.6 OR	1st place, gold medalist(s)
William Hoyt	110 m hurdles	Unknown	2	DNS	
Fred Lord	110 m hurdles	DNS		Did not advance	
Charles Vanoni	110 m hurdles	DNS		Did not advance	
Arthur Blake	Marathon	—N/a		DNF	

Field events

Athlete	Event	Final	
Athlete	Event	Distance	Position
Ellery Harding Clark	Men's high jump	1.81 OR	1st place, gold medalist(s)
James Brendan Connolly	Men's high jump	1.65	2nd place, silver medalist(s)
John Stanley Edwards	Men's high jump	DNS	
Robert Garrett	Men's high jump	1.65	2nd place, silver medalist(s)
William Hoyt	Men's pole vault	3.30 OR	1st place, gold medalist(s)
Albert Tyler	Men's pole vault	3.20	2nd place, silver medalist(s)
Charles Vanoni	Men's pole vault	DNS	
Ellery Harding Clark	Men's long jump	6.35 OR	1st place, gold medalist(s)
James Brendan Connolly	Men's long jump	6.11	3rd place, bronze medalist(s)
Thomas Curtis	Men's long jump	DNS	
Ralph Derr	Men's long jump	DNS	
Robert Garrett	Men's long jump	6.18	2nd place, silver medalist(s)
James Brendan Connolly	Men's triple jump	13.71 OR	1st place, gold medalist(s)
Ellery Harding Clark	Men's shot put	Unknown	5-7
Robert Garrett	Men's shot put	11.22 OR	1st place, gold medalist(s)
Charles Vanoni	Men's shot put	DNS	
Robert Garrett	Men's discus throw	29.15 WR	1st place, gold medalist(s)
Charles Vanoni	Men's discus throw	DNS	

== Cycling ==
=== Road ===
Athlete	Event	Time	Rank
A. Johnson	Men's road race	DNS	
B. MacDonald	Men's road race	DNS	

== Fencing ==
Athlete	Event	Round 1			Final	
Athlete	Event	MW	ML	Rank	Opposition Score	Rank
Fred Hellen	Men's foil	DNS				
Albertson Van Zo Post	Men's sabre	DNS				

== Shooting ==
The Paine brothers contested only two events, taking the top two spots in the event in which they both competed, the military pistol. Sumner was the only one of the two to enter the free pistol, which he won. Waldstein was the third member of the American shooting contingent, competing in the military rifle event.

Athlete	Event	Final	
Athlete	Event	Score	Rank
Charles Waldstein	Men's 200 m military rifle	Unknown	14-41
John Paine	Men's 25 m military pistol	442	1st place, gold medalist(s)
Sumner Paine	Men's 25 m military pistol	380	2nd place, silver medalist(s)
Sumner Paine	Men's 30 m pistol	442	1st place, gold medalist(s)

== Swimming ==
Williams competed in two swimming events, with his results currently being unknown (lost in the years since).

Athlete	Event	Final	
Athlete	Event	Time	Rank
Gardner Williams	100 m freestyle	Unknown	3-10
Gardner Williams	1200 m freestyle	Unknown	3-8
