= Athletics at the 1896 Summer Olympics =

Athletics at the Games of the I Olympiad
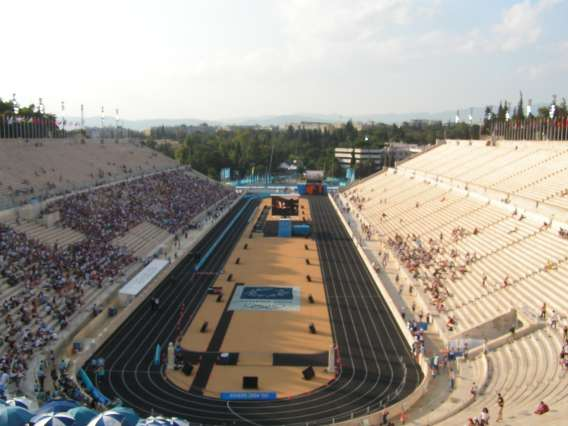
- The renovated Panathinaiko Stadium
- Venue: Panathinaiko Stadium
- Dates: 6–10 April 1896
- No. of events: 12 (12 men, 0 women)
- Competitors: 63 from 9 nations

At the 1896 Summer Olympics, the first modern Olympiad, twelve athletics events were contested. A total of 25 medals (12 silver for winners, 13 bronze for runner-up, none for third) were awarded. The medals were later denoted as 37 modern medals (12 gold, 13 silver, 12 bronze). All of the events except the marathon were held in the Panathinaiko Stadium, which was also the finish for the marathon. Events were held on 6 April, 7 April, 9 April, and 10 April 1896 (all dates are according to the Gregorian calendar). Altogether, 63 athletes, all men, from nine nations competed. This made athletics the most international of the nine sports at the 1896 Games.

== Summary of events ==
The American team of 11, which featured only one national champion, was dominant, taking 9 of the 12 titles. No world records were set, because few international top competitors had participated. In addition, the curves of the track were very tight, making fast times in the running events virtually impossible.

The heats of the 100 metres were the first Olympic event to be conducted, and the winner of the first heat, Francis Lane, can thus be considered the first Olympic winner. The first Olympic champion was crowned in the triple jump, Harvard student James Connolly. Connolly also did well in the other jumping events, placing second in the high jump and third in the long jump.

Many other athletes were versatile as well. Thomas Burke won both the 100 metres and 400 metres, a feat not since repeated, while London-based Australian Edwin Flack won the 800 and 1500 metres races. Robert Garrett, a Princeton student, won two first and two second places. His first title was in the discus throw, an event originating from the Ancient Olympics, but never before held at an international event. Garrett had attempted to train for the event with a 10 kilogram replica of a discus, but had given up as it was too heavy. When he learned the actual competition discus weighed only 2 kilograms, he entered the event after all, and won it, to the dismay of the Greek public, who considered their throwers "unbeatable".

A second event held for the first time in international competition was the marathon foot race. It was conceived by Michel Bréal, a friend of Pierre de Coubertin, based on the legend of Pheidippides. This Athenian soldier first completed a two-day run to seek Spartan help against the invading Persians in the Battle of Marathon, and then ran from the town of Marathon to Athens days later to announce the victory, dying as a result of his heroic efforts. The race started in Marathon, and ran for 40 kilometres over dusty roads to Athens. The Greek public, disappointed as there had not yet been a Greek victor in athletics, was overjoyed when it was announced during the race that a Greek runner had taken the lead. When Spiridon Louis, a water carrier from Maroussi, arrived in the stadium he was accompanied by the Greek Crown Prince on his final lap. Louis would never again compete in a race, but his victory made him a national hero.

The exploits of Louis, Garrett, Connolly, and Flack would be chronicled in the 1984 NBC miniseries, The First Olympics: Athens, 1896.

The day after the official marathon Stamata Revithi ran the 40-kilometer course in 5 hours 30 minutes, finishing outside Panathinaiko Stadium. She was denied entry into the official competition since the 1896 Olympics excluded women from competition.

== Schedule ==
Legend
| P | Preliminary round | Q | Qualification | H | Heats | ½ | Semi-finals | F | Final |

Men's
| Date | Apr 6 | | Apr 7 | | Apr 8 | | Apr 9 | | Apr 10 | |
| Event | M | E | M | E | M | E | M | E | M | E |
|---|---|---|---|---|---|---|---|---|---|---|
| 100 m | H | | | | | | | | | F |
| 400 m | H | | | F | | | | | | |
| 800 m | H | | | | | | F | | | |
| 1500 m | | | | F | | | | | | |
| 110 m hurdles | | | | H | | | | | | F |
| Marathon | | | | | | | | | | F |
| High jump | | | | | | | | | | F |
| Pole vault | | | | | | | | | | F |
| Long jump | | | | F | | | | | | |
| Triple jump | | F | | | | | | | | |
| Shot put | | | | F | | | | | | |
| Discus throw | | F | | | | | | | | |

== Medal summary ==
These medals were retroactively assigned by the International Olympic Committee; at the time, winners were given a silver medal and runners-up bronze medals. Athletes coming third received no award.

| Event | Gold | | Silver | | Bronze | |
|---|---|---|---|---|---|---|
| 100 metres | Thomas Burke; United States | 12.0 | Fritz Hofmann; Germany | 12.2 | Francis Lane; United States | 12.6 |
| 100 metres | Thomas Burke; United States | 12.0 | Fritz Hofmann; Germany | 12.2 | Alajos Szokolyi; Hungary | 12.6 |
| 400 metres | Thomas Burke; United States | 54.2 OR | Herbert Jamison; United States | 55.2 | Charles Gmelin; Great Britain | 56.7 |
| 800 metres | Edwin Flack; Australia | 2:11.0 | Nándor Dáni; Hungary | 2:11.8 | Dimitrios Golemis; Greece | 2:28.0 |
| 1500 metres | Edwin Flack; Australia | 4:33.2 OR | Arthur Blake; United States | 4:33.6 | Albin Lermusiaux; France | 4:36.0 |
| 110 metres hurdles | Thomas Curtis; United States | 17.6 OR | Grantley Goulding; Great Britain | 17.7 | none awarded | |
| Marathon | Spiridon Louis; Greece | 2:58:50 OR | Charilaos Vasilakos; Greece | 3:06:03 | Gyula Kellner; Hungary | 3:06:35 |
| High jump | Ellery Clark; United States | 1.81 m OR | James Connolly; United States | 1.65 m | none awarded | |
| High jump | Ellery Clark; United States | 1.81 m OR | Robert Garrett; United States | 1.65 m | none awarded | |
| Pole vault | William Hoyt; United States | 3.30 m OR | Albert Tyler; United States | 3.20 m | Evangelos Damaskos; Greece | 2.60 m |
| Pole vault | William Hoyt; United States | 3.30 m OR | Albert Tyler; United States | 3.20 m | Ioannis Theodoropoulos; Greece | 2.60 m |
| Long jump | Ellery Clark; United States | 6.35 m OR | Robert Garrett; United States | 6.00 m | James Connolly; United States | 5.84 m |
| Triple jump | James Connolly; United States | 13.71 m OR | Alexandre Tuffère; France | 12.70 m | Ioannis Persakis; Greece | 12.52 m |
| Shot put | Robert Garrett; United States | 11.22 m OR | Miltiadis Gouskos; Greece | 11.03 m | Georgios Papasideris; Greece | 10.36 m |
| Discus throw | Robert Garrett; United States | 29.15 m OR | Panagiotis Paraskevopoulos; Greece | 28.95 m | Sotirios Versis; Greece | 27.78 m |

== Medal table ==
| Rank | Nation | Gold | Silver | Bronze | Total |
|---|---|---|---|---|---|
| 1 | United States | 9 | 6 | 2 | 17 |
| 2 | Australia | 2 | 0 | 0 | 2 |
| 3 | Greece | 1 | 3 | 6 | 10 |
| 4 | Hungary | 0 | 1 | 2 | 3 |
| 5 | France | 0 | 1 | 1 | 2 |
| 5 | Great Britain | 0 | 1 | 1 | 2 |
| 7 | Germany | 0 | 1 | 0 | 1 |
| Totals (7 entries) | | 12 | 13 | 12 | 37 |

== Participating nations ==
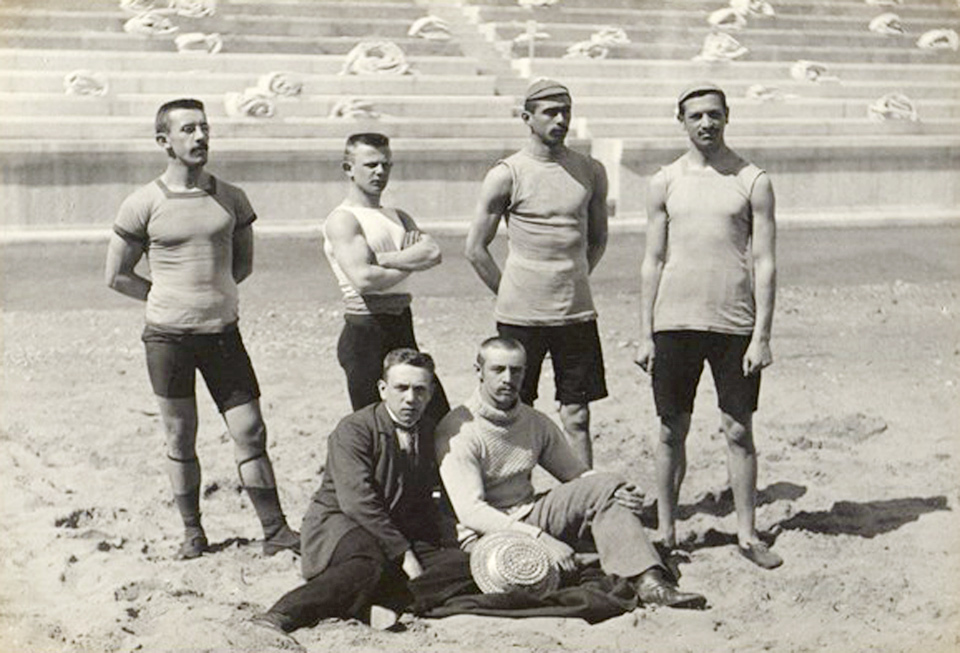
Hungarian athletic team of 1896 Summer Olympics

A total of 63 athletes from 9 nations competed at the Athens Games. Due to the nature of participation at the Games of the time not being fully through National Olympic Committees, there is a lack of clarity on which nations competed. For instance, Olympedia lists 1 athlete from Cyprus and 2 from Smyrna in counting 11 nations, but also notes the participation of "Cyprus and Smyrna as part of the Greek team". Further, Chile claims to have had a competitor participate, which would increase the total to 64 athletes from 10 nations, but other sources list Luis Subercaseaux as not having started.

- Australia (1)
- Denmark (3)
- France (5)
- Germany (5)
- Great Britain (5)
- Greece (29)
- Hungary (3)
- Sweden (1)
- United States (10)

== See also ==
- List of Olympic medalists in athletics (men)
- List of Olympic medalists in athletics (women)
