= Gardner Williams =

Gardner Williams may refer to:

- Gardner Williams (swimmer) (1877–1933), American freestyle swimmer
- Gardner Williams (American football) (born 1961), American football player
- Gardner D. Williams (1804–1858), American politician
- Gardner F. Williams (1842–1922), American mining engineer and author
