= Athletics at the 1896 Summer Olympics – Men's shot put =

Men's shot put at the Games of the I Olympiad
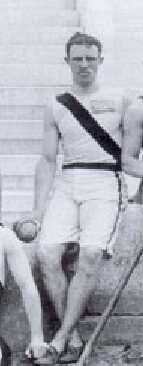
- Robert Garrett
- Venue: Panathinaiko Stadium
- Dates: 7 April 1896
- Competitors: 7 from 4 nations
- Winning distance: 11.22 OR

Medalists
1st place, gold medalist(s)		Robert Garrett; United States
2nd place, silver medalist(s)		Miltiadis Gouskos; Greece
3rd place, bronze medalist(s)		Georgios Papasideris; Greece

The men's shot put was one of two throwing events on the Athletics at the 1896 Summer Olympics programme. Seven athletes took part in the shot put competition on 7 April. The two Greek athletes both won medals, with Gouskos battling closely with Garrett of the United States for the longest distance.

== Background ==
This was the first appearance of the event, which is one of 12 athletics events to have been held at every Summer Olympics. Fifteen athletes entered, but only seven started. The world record holder was George Gray of Canada, but he was absent; so too was 1896's best thrower, Irishman Denis Horgan. The event was "excessively popular in Greece" and was one of the events where the hosts had a real opportunity to win.

== Competition format ==
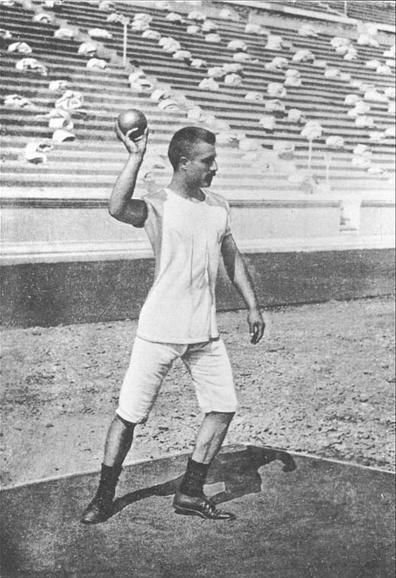
The shot put event

There was a single round of throwing. The format of the competition is unclear; it appears that each thrower received three throws and the top four after that received three more. The Official Report, though, says that "Five Competitors retired after a little while, only ... Gouskos and Mr Garret kept up the sport for a considerable length of time."

The throwing stage was a 2.13 metre square. George S. Robertson said that this square "corresponded with no known rules, although the event was purported to be held under English rules." Robertson attributed the short distances of the event to this oddity of the field.

== Records ==
These were the standing world and Olympic records (in metres) prior to the 1896 Summer Olympics.

World record	George Gray (CAN)^{*}	14.32	Chicago, United States	16 September 1893
Olympic record	N/A			

^{*} unofficial

The following record was established during the competition:

Date	Event	Athlete	Nation	Distance (m)	Record
April 7	Final	Robert Garrett	United States	11.22	OR

== Schedule ==
Date		Time	Round
Gregorian	Julian	Time	Round
Tuesday, 7 April 1896	Tuesday, 26 March 1896	15:40	Final

== Results ==
Detailed results are not known. The top three finishers, and their best throws, are clear; however, after that sources differ even as to who the competitors were. The IOC lists the seven competitors below, with rankings for the top four. The Official Report gives Garrett's winning distance as 11.22 metres, with Gouskos "a few centimetres" behind. The IOC webpage gives Gouskos's distance at 11.20 metres, while other sources give varying distances (Kluge agrees with 11.20, Olympedia has 11.03, zur Megede has 11.15). All agree on Papsideris's third-place distance at 10.36 metres. There are two entirely different sets of four competitors for 4th through 7th: the IOC and Olympedia have Jensen in 4th, with Clark, Hofmann, and Schuhmann also competing, while Kluge and zur Megede have Robertson, Adler, Sotirios Versis, and Winckler (all except Versis listed by Olympedia as entered but not starting) in order for 4th through 7th places. They have a 9.95 metre throw for Robertson listed. The IOC does not give a distance for any athlete after 3rd, but Olympedia has 10.00 metres for Scuhmann.

While most of the throwing sequence is unknown, the two best throws are specifically recorded. Garrett's winning throw was his first throw. Gouskos's best, coming closest to Garrett's, was his last. The ultimate Gouskos throw was so close that the home nation crowd thought it good enough for a win, and the "official posting the scores made an error and initially listed Gouskos as the winner"; however, the error was corrected and Garrett announced as the winner.

Olympedia lists 12 nonstarters, but states (consistent with the Official Report) that "seven of the 15 final entries actually started).

Rank	Athlete	Nation	Distance	Notes
1st place, gold medalist(s)	Robert Garrett	United States	11.22	OR
2nd place, silver medalist(s)	Miltiadis Gouskos	Greece	11.20	
3rd place, bronze medalist(s)	Georgios Papasideris	Greece	10.36	
4	Viggo Jensen	Denmark	Unknown	
5—7	Ellery Clark	United States	Unknown	
5—7	Carl Schuhmann	Germany	10.00	
5—7	Fritz Hofmann	Germany	Unknown	
—	Louis Adler	France	DNS	
—	Conrad Böcker	Germany	DNS	
—	Alfred Flatow	Germany	DNS	
—	Adolphe Grisel	France	DNS	
—	Holger Nielsen	Denmark	DNS	
—	Pál Péthy	Hungary	DNS	
—	George S. Robertson	Great Britain	DNS	
—	Momčilo Tapavica	Hungary	DNS	
—	Charles Vanoni	United States	DNS	
—	Desiderius Wein	Hungary	DNS	
—	Hermann Weingärtner	Germany	DNS	
—	Charles Winckler	Denmark	DNS	

== Sources ==
- Lampros, S.P.; Polites, N.G.; De Coubertin, Pierre; Philemon, P.J. & Anninos, C. (1897). The Olympic Games: BC 776 – AD 1896. Athens: Charles Beck. (Digitally available at la84foundation.org)
- Mallon, Bill & Widlund, Ture (1998). The 1896 Olympic Games. Results for All Competitors in All Events, with Commentary. Jefferson: McFarland. ISBN 0-7864-0379-9. (Excerpt available at la84foundation.org)
- Smith, Michael Llewellyn (2004). Olympics in Athens 1896. The Invention of the Modern Olympic Games. London: Profile Books. ISBN 1-86197-342-X.
