= Swimming at the 1896 Summer Olympics – Men's 100 metre freestyle =

Men's 100 metre freestyle at the Games of the I Olympiad
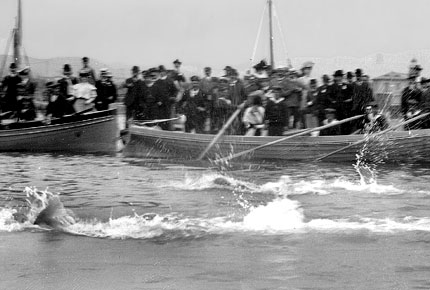
- Swimming at the 1896 Summer Olympics
- Venue: Bay of Zea
- Date: April 11
- Competitors: 10 from 4 nations
- Winning time: 1:22.2 OR

Medalists
1st place, gold medalist(s)		Alfréd Hajós; Hungary
2nd place, silver medalist(s)		Otto Herschmann; Austria

The men's 100 metre freestyle was one of the four swimming events on the Swimming at the 1896 Summer Olympics programme. The 100 metre freestyle race was the first of the swimming events. Ten swimmers entered the race. The two competitors from Austria-Hungary finished in the top two places, though no record distinguishes the places of the other eight competitors. Alfréd Hajós of Hungary beat Otto Herschmann of Austria by about half a metre, with the other swimmers far behind. The Hungarian flag was hoisted, but the band began to play the Austrian anthem (Gott erhalte Franz den Kaiser) until the Hungarian sang the Hungarian anthem (Himnusz).

== Background ==
This was the first appearance of the men's 100 metre freestyle. The event has been held at every Summer Olympics except 1900 (when the shortest freestyle was the 200 metres), though the 1904 version was measured in yards rather than metres.

Alfréd Hajós was the 1895 European champion.

== Competition format ==
The competition involved a single race, with all swimmers competing at the same time. The swimmers were taken out by ship into the bay, where they would swim toward shore. Buoys marked the starting line, hollow pumpkins (which tended to move) marked the course, and a red flag marked the finish line.

== Records ==
These were the standing world and Olympic records (in metres) prior to the 1896 Summer Olympics.

World record	Unknown^{*}	Unknown	Unknown	Unknown
Olympic record	N/A	N/A	N/A	N/A

^{*} unofficial

The following record was established during the competition:

Date	Event	Athlete	Nation	Distance (m)	Record
April 11	Final	Alfréd Hajós	Hungary	1:22.2	OR

== Schedule ==
The 100 metres freestyle was the first of the swimming events.

Date		Time	Round
Gregorian	Julian	Time	Round
Saturday, 11 April 1896	Saturday, 30 March 1896	11:00	Final

== Results ==
Rank	Swimmer	Nation	Time
1st place, gold medalist(s)	Alfréd Hajós	Hungary	1:22.2
2nd place, silver medalist(s)	Otto Herschmann	Austria	1:22.8
3–10	Georgios Annios	Greece	Unknown
3–10	Efstathios Chorafas	Greece	Unknown
3–10	Alexandros Chrysafos	Greece	Unknown
3–10	Gardner Williams	United States	Unknown
3–10	Four others, names unknown	Greece	Unknown
