= Athletics at the 1896 Summer Olympics – Men's triple jump =

Men's triple jump at the Games of the I Olympiad
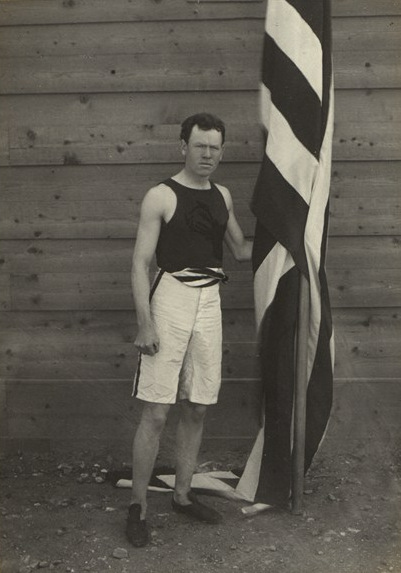
- James B. Connolly won the triple jump and became the first Olympic Champion since the 4th century AD
- Venue: Panathinaiko Stadium
- Dates: 6 April 1896
- Competitors: 7 from 5 nations
- Winning distance: 13.71 OR

Medalists
1st place, gold medalist(s)		James Brendan Connolly; United States
2nd place, silver medalist(s)		Alexandre Tuffèri; France
3rd place, bronze medalist(s)		Ioannis Persakis; Greece

The men's triple jump was one of four jumping events on the Athletics at the 1896 Summer Olympics programme. There were 7 competitors from 5 nations in the triple jump, then known as the "hop, skip, and jump" despite the wide range of techniques used by the competitors. The event was held on 6 April, immediately after the first heats of the 100 metre race. Since there was only one round of the triple jump, the winner was crowned as the first modern Olympic champion.

The winning margin was 1.01 metres which as of 2023 remains the only time the men's triple jump was won by more than 60 cm at the Olympics.

== Background ==
This was the first appearance of the event, which is one of 12 athletics events to have been held at every Summer Olympics. There were 11 entrants, but only 7 men actually started.

== Competition format ==
There was a single round of jumping. There were no rules on the jumps allowed. "The styles of the medalists were described in The Field as follows: Connolly took two hops on his right foot and then a jump; Tuffèri performed a hop, step and a jump in the standard English method; and Persakis used two steps and a jump."

== Records ==
There were no standing Olympic records (as this was the first Games) before the event.

World record	Matthew Roseingreue (IRL)^{*}	15.26 m (50 ft 3/4 in)	Gort	15 August 1895
Olympic record	N/A	N/A	N/A	N/A

^{*} unofficial

The following record was established during the competition:

Date	Event	Athlete	Nation	Distance (m)	Record
April 6	Final	James Brendan Connolly	United States	13.71	OR

== Schedule ==
The exact time of the contest is not known; it was the second event of the Games. The first day began with the arrival of the King and a brief opening ceremony at 3 p.m., followed by the first round of the 100 metres before the triple jump began.

Date		Time	Round
Gregorian	Julian	Time	Round
Monday, 6 April 1896	Monday, 25 March 1896		Final

== Results ==
Rank	Athlete	Nation	Distance	Notes
1st place, gold medalist(s)	James Brendan Connolly	United States	13.71	OR
2nd place, silver medalist(s)	Alexandre Tuffèri	France	12.70	
3rd place, bronze medalist(s)	Ioannis Persakis	Greece	12.52	
4	Alajos Szokolyi	Hungary	11.26	
5	Carl Schuhmann	Germany	Unknown	
6–7	Fritz Hofmann	Germany	Unknown	
6–7	Khristos Zoumis	Greece	Unknown	
—	Alfred Flatow	Germany	DNS	
—	Adolphe Grisel	France	DNS	
—	Pál Péthy	Hungary	DNS	
—	Friedrich Traun	Germany	DNS	

== Sources ==
- Lampros, S.P.; Polites, N.G.; De Coubertin, Pierre; Philemon, P.J. & Anninos, C. (1897). The Olympic Games: BC 776 – AD 1896. Athens: Charles Beck. (Digitally available at la84foundation.org)
- Mallon, Bill & Widlund, Ture (1998). The 1896 Olympic Games. Results for All Competitors in All Events, with Commentary. Jefferson: McFarland. ISBN 0-7864-0379-9. (Excerpt available at la84foundation.org)
- Smith, Michael Llewellyn (2004). Olympics in Athens 1896. The Invention of the Modern Olympic Games. London: Profile Books. ISBN 1-86197-342-X.
