= Gardner Williams (swimmer) =

American swimmer

- Williams at 18 in 1896, cropped from group photo of the 1896 U.S. Olympic team, with U.S. flag in background.

Personal information
- Full name: Gardner Boyd Williams
- Nickname: "Gardy"
- Born: April 16, 1877 Jamaica Plain, Massachusetts, U.S.
- Died: December 14, 1933 (aged 56) Marblehead, Massachusetts, U.S.
- Occupations: Executive, textile manufacturing
- Spouses: Ruth Buckminster Williams; Katherine Dudolf Williams
- Children: 1

Sport
- Sport: Swimming
- Events: 100 meter, 1200 meter
- Strokes: Freestyle
- Club: Boston Athletic Association

Gardner Boyd Williams (April 16, 1877 – December 14, 1933) was an American freestyle swimmer, who competed for the Boston Athletic Association. He participated in the 1896 Summer Olympics in Athens, as the first Olympic swimming competitor for the United States; he competed in the 100-meter freestyle and the 1,200 meter freestyle events. In professional pursuits, he worked as a wool merchant for the family business Jeremiah Williams & Co., and was a Director and Executive of the Beacon Manufacturing Company, a maker of cotton and wool blankets and napped products.

== Early life ==
Williams was born April 16, 1877 in Jamaica Plain, Massachusetts, and grew up in an affluent Suffolk County neighborhood, one of around three siblings to father Jeremiah and mother Ella Endora Williams. Jeremiah Williams, his father, was the owner of a large wool trading company, Jeremiah Williams & Co. Gardner's father Jeremiah also served as a Boston Wool Trade Association President, and in 1904, was one of the original founders of the Beacon Manufacturing Company, a producer of cotton and wool textiles. The company had a few family members other than Gardner in executive roles. Gardner swam and competed in athletics with the Boston Athletic Association, a prestigious club where he would remain active.

== 1896 Athens Olympics ==
On April 11, 1996, at the age of 18, Williams was scheduled to participate as the youngest member of the American Olympic team, in the 100 metre freestyle event. He was the only swimmer in a 13 member U.S. Olympic team. His participation marked him as the first American Olympian to participate in swimming. His time and place in his two events were not recorded, though he did not finish in the top two. He also entered the 1200 metre freestyle competition, not placing in the top three of that event. In addition to the United States, Austria, Greece, and Hungary competed in the swimming competitions.

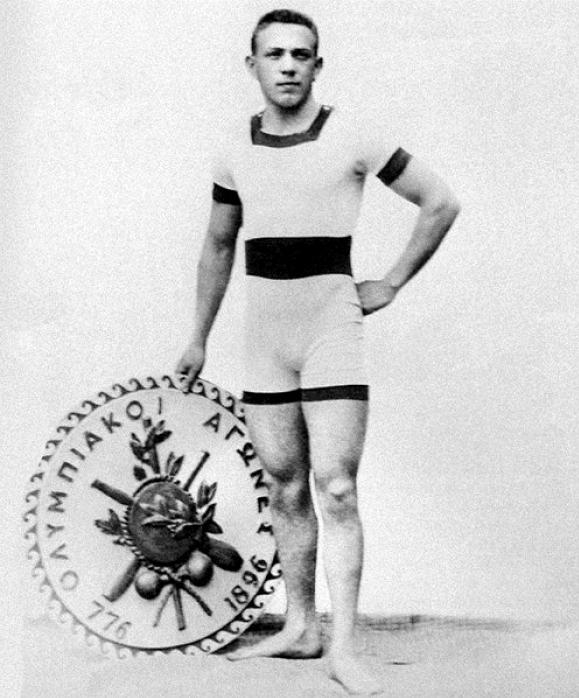
Gold swimming medalist Alfred Hajos, 1896 Olympics

One of Gardner's Olympic teammates related that at the start of the 100-meter swimming competition for the 1896 Olympics, Gardner jumped in the water at the Mediterranean's Bay of Piraeu as the only American entrant in the race after spending entirely his own money on training and travel, only to quickly exit the water and exclaim, "I'm freezing." The participants took a raft to the start of the race and swam to shore. Official information from Olympedia, the website for Olympic data, indicate Williams did, however, finish the race, as he is given an AC, Also Completed status by Olympedia. During the 1896 Olympics, the breezy weather had lowered the temperature in the Bay of Piraeu where the swim took place, to an estimated 13 °C (55 °F), leading several athletes to withdraw from the race, though reliable sources state that Williams finished the event. In a close finish in the 100 meter event, Alfred Hajos of Hungary won the Gold medal with a time of 1:22.2, and Otto Herschmann of Austria won the silver with a time of 1:22.8. At only 18, Hajos became the first modern Olympic swimming champion, and the first Olympic champion of Hungary. Most other contestants lagged well behind Hajos and Herschmann, perhaps due to both current, sizable waves, and the temperature of the water. A number of entered contestants did not start.

In the 1200 meter event, a distance no longer used in swimming events, Alfred Hajos of Hungary finished first to earn his second gold medal with a time of 18.22.2, and Ioannis Andreou of Greece finished second for the silver with a time of 21:03.4.

== Careers ==
Williams worked for the family wool trading business, Jeremiah Williams & Co., which led him to travel throughout the Middle East and Europe. He later worked as a Vice-President for the Beacon Manufacturing Company, a maker of napped products and blankets made of wool and cotton. The company experienced considerable growth during Williams' tenure as an executive. Associated with Beacon over a long period, he was a director with the company as early as 1911. In the 1930's the company headquarters were moved to Swannanoa, North Carolina. In avocations, Williams was active with the Boston Athletic Association, planning a number of their track events. A track trophy, the Gardner B. Williams trophy was named in his honor.

=== Death and family ===
He was married to Katherine Dudolf Williams. From October 24, 1898, through mid-1918 had formerly been married to Ruth Buckminster Williams Hunt. Ruth and Gardner had one son, Jeremiah.

Gardner Boyd Williams died December 14, 1933, in Marblehead, Massachusetts at the age of 57. Services were held at the Forest Hill Crematory Chapel in his native town of Jamaica Plain, Massachusetts, twenty miles South of Marblehead on December 16.
