= Athletics at the 1896 Summer Olympics – Men's high jump =

Men's high jump at the Games of the I Olympiad
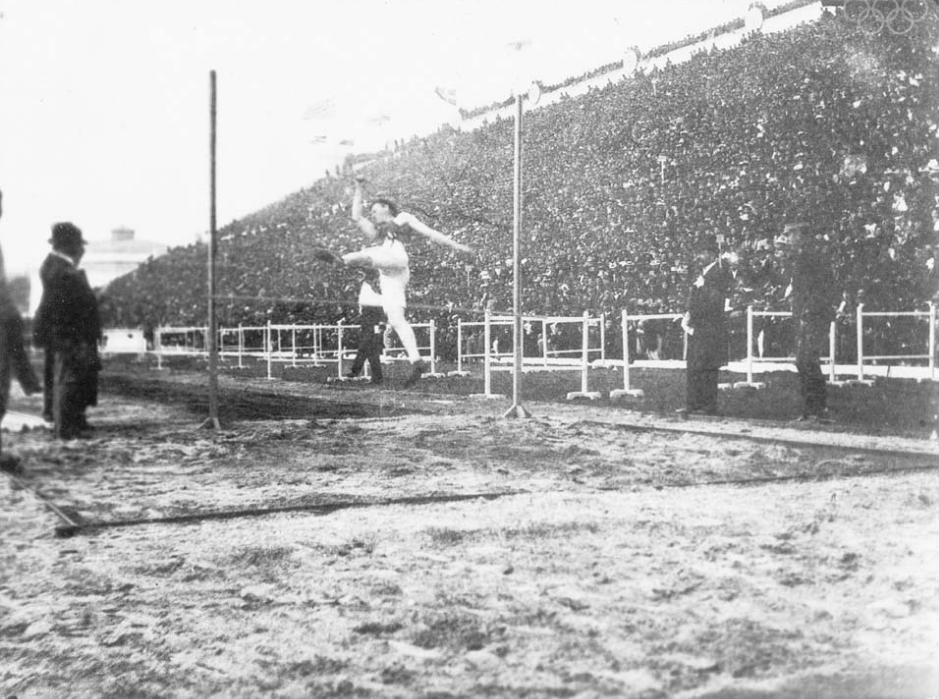
- A picture from events
- Venue: Panathinaiko Stadium
- Dates: 10 April 1896
- Competitors: 5 from 3 nations
- Winning height: 1.81 OR

Medalists
1st place, gold medalist(s)		Ellery Clark; United States
2nd place, silver medalist(s)		Robert Garrett; United States
2nd place, silver medalist(s)		James Connolly; United States

The men's high jump was one of four jumping events on the Athletics at the 1896 Summer Olympics programme. The high jump was held on 10 April. Five competitors took part in the event, three of them Americans. Ellery Clark, who had previously won the long jump, also won this event. Garrett and Connolly tied for second place.

== Background ==
This was the first appearance of the event, which is one of 12 athletics events to have been held at every Summer Olympics. Fourteen athletes entered, but only five started. This was the only one of the 12 athletics events in 1896 in which there were no Greek competitors. The world record holder was Michael Sweeney, but he had "turned professional in early 1896 and was not eligible."

== Competition format ==
There was a single round of jumping. The bar started at 1.50 metres, increasing 5 centimetres at a time until 1.60 metres and then by 2.5 centimetres at a time. When the victor was the only man left, he was able to choose the height.

== Records ==
There were no standing world records (the IAAF began ratifying records in 1912) or Olympic records (as this was the first Games) before the event. The unofficial world record holder was Michael Sweeney at 6 ft 5 in (1.95 m).

World record	Michael Sweeney (USA)^{*}	6 ft 5 in (1.95 m)	New York	September 1895
Olympic record	N/A			

^{*} unofficial

The following record was established during the competition:

Date	Event	Athlete	Nation	Distance (m)	Record
April 10	Final	Ellery Clark	United States	1.81	OR

== Schedule ==
The exact time of the contest is not known; it was the second event of the afternoon session, following only the 100 metres final.

Date		Time	Round
Gregorian	Julian	Time	Round
Thursday, 10 April 1896	Thursday, 29 March 1896		Final

== Results ==
Key

- o = Height cleared
- x = Height failed
- – = Height passed
- r = Retired
- SB = Season's best
- PB = Personal best
- NR = National record
- AR = Area record
- OR = Olympic record
- WR = World record
- WL = World lead
- NM = No mark
- DNS = Did not start
- DQ = Disqualified

All five cleared the bar at 1.50 and 1.55 metres. Hofmann was unable to clear 1.60 metres. Sjöberg made that jump, but could not clear 1.625 metres. All three Americans made that mark and the next, at 1.65 metres, but only Clark was able to clear 1.675 metres. He then cleared 1.70, 1.75, and 1.81 metres successively. Jump sequences are not known

Rank	Athlete	Nation	1.50	1.55	1.60	1.625	1.65	1.675	1.70	1.75	1.81	Height	Notes
1st place, gold medalist(s)	Ellery Clark	United States	o	o	o	o	o	o	o	o	o	1.81	OR
2nd place, silver medalist(s)	Robert Garrett	United States	o	o	o	o	o	x	—			1.65	
2nd place, silver medalist(s)	James Connolly	United States	o	o	o	o	o	x	—			1.65	
4	Henrik Sjöberg	Sweden	o	o	o	x	—					1.60	
5	Fritz Hofmann	Germany	o	o	x	—						1.55	

== Sources ==
- Lampros, S.P.; Polites, N.G.; De Coubertin, Pierre; Philemon, P.J. & Anninos, C. (1897). The Olympic Games: BC 776 – AD 1896. Athens: Charles Beck. (Digitally available at la84foundation.org)
- Mallon, Bill & Widlund, Ture (1998). The 1896 Olympic Games. Results for All Competitors in All Events, with Commentary. Jefferson: McFarland. ISBN 0-7864-0379-9. (Excerpt available at la84foundation.org)
- Smith, Michael Llewellyn (2004). Olympics in Athens 1896. The Invention of the Modern Olympic Games. London: Profile Books. ISBN 1-86197-342-X.
