= Athletics at the 1896 Summer Olympics – Men's long jump =

Men's long jump at the Games of the I Olympiad
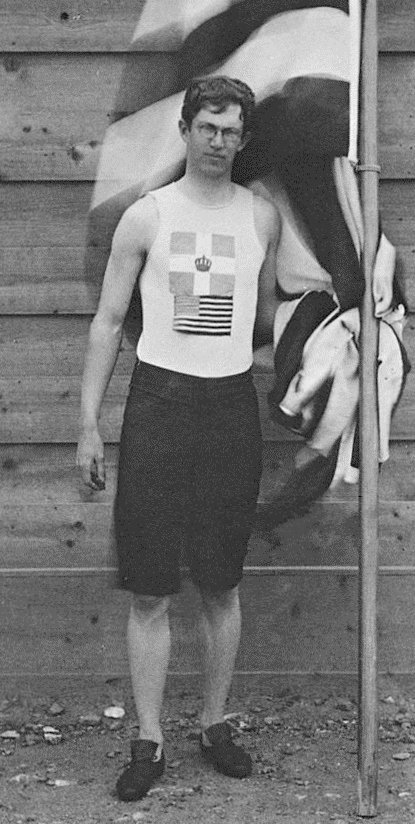
- Ellery Harding Clark
- Venue: Panathinaiko Stadium
- Dates: 7 April 1896
- Competitors: 9 from 5 nations
- Winning distance: 6.35 OR

Medalists
1st place, gold medalist(s)		Ellery Harding Clark; United States
2nd place, silver medalist(s)		Robert Garrett; United States
3rd place, bronze medalist(s)		James Brendan Connolly; United States

The men's long jump was one of four jumping events on the Athletics at the 1896 Summer Olympics programme. There were nine contestants in the long jump, held on 7 April. The American jumpers proved themselves dominant in taking the top three spots. The event was won by Ellery Harding Clark. Clark would later win the high jump as well, becoming the only man (through 2016, at least) to win both the high jump and long jump in the Olympics.

== Summary ==
Clark's first two jumps were fouls, but his third was by far the best of the field. He had used his hat as a marker along the runway for the first two jumps, which Constantine I of Greece (acting as the judge in the event) had declared inconsistent with amateurism; the king removed the hat both times. For the third attempt, Clark did not attempt to use the hat.

== Background ==
This was the first appearance of the event, which is one of 12 athletics events to have been held at every Summer Olympics. There were 23 entrants, but only nine men actually started.

== Competition format ==
There was a single round of jumping. Each athlete made three jumps.

== Records ==
There were no standing Olympic records (as this was the first Games) before the event. The IAAF did not start ratifying official world records until 1912.

World record	John Mooney (IRL)^{*}	7.21 m (23 ft 7 3/4 in)	Mitchelstown	5 September 1894
Olympic record	N/A	N/A	N/A	N/A

^{*} unofficial

The following record was established during the competition:

Date	Event	Athlete	Nation	Distance (m)	Record
April 7	Final	Ellery Harding Clark	United States	6.35	OR

== Schedule ==
The exact time of the contest is not known; it was the second event of the afternoon session on Tuesday. The session started at 2:30 p.m.; the long jump came after two heats of the 110 metres hurdles.

Date		Time	Round
Gregorian	Julian	Time	Round
Tuesday, 7 April 1896	Tuesday, 26 March 1896		Final

== Results ==
As with many early Olympic events, the complete results are unclear and disputed. The table below provides results consistent with the IOC's website results page. The Official Report says that only eight men competed; it lists only four: Chalkokondylis and Skaltsogiannis as the Greeks who competed, and Clark and Garrett as the prize winners. It gives Garrett's distance at 6.00 metres. Olympedia follows the Official Report rather than the IOC results page for Garrett's distance, puts Connolly's best jump at 5.84 metres, gives Chalkokondylis in fourth place (using the 5.74 metres from the IOC), and cites the remaining 5 jumpers all as "also competed" with no distance given; Olympedia also lists the 14 non-starters shown below (though this would make 23 entries rather than the 18 provided by both Olympedia itself and the Official Report). Kluge uses the flat 6 metres for Garrett and puts Connolly's jump (rather than that of Chalkokondylis) at 5.74 metres, marking all six remaining men as "also competed." Zur Megede matches the IOC page through the top five, but Sjöberg is replaced by the Hungarian Desiderius Wein with a distance of 5.64 metres, placing him after Schuhmann; Schuhmann (with the same 5.70 metres as the IOC) is moved up to 6th without Sjöberg and with Chalkokondylis being marked as "also competed." No source lists the results of individual jumps, other than remarking that Clark fouled on his first two attempts and achieved his 6.35 metres on the final one.

Rank	Athlete	Nation	Distance	Notes
1st place, gold medalist(s)	Ellery Harding Clark	United States	6.35	OR
2nd place, silver medalist(s)	Robert Garrett	United States	6.18	
3rd place, bronze medalist(s)	James Brendan Connolly	United States	6.11	
4	Alexandre Tuffèri	France	5.98	
5	Adolphe Grisel	France	5.83	
6	Henrik Sjöberg	Sweden	5.80	
7	Alexandros Chalkokondylis	Greece	5.74	
8	Carl Schuhmann	Germany	5.70	
9	Athanasios Skaltsogiannis	Greece	Unknown	
—	Harald Arbin	Sweden	DNS	
—	Thomas Curtis	United States	DNS	
—	Nándor Dáni	Hungary	DNS	
—	Ralph Derr	United States	DNS	
—	Kurt Doerry	Germany	DNS	
—	Alfred Flatow	Germany	DNS	
—	Carl Galle	Germany	DNS	
—	Fritz Hofmann	Germany	DNS	
—	Konstantinos Mouratis	Greece	DNS	
—	Pál Péthy	Hungary	DNS	
—	Alajos Szokolyi	Hungary	DNS	
—	Momcsilló Tapavicza	Hungary	DNS	
—	Friedrich Traun	Germany	DNS	
—	Hermann Weingärtner	Germany	DNS	
