= Otto Herschmann =

Austrian sportsman

Personal information
- Citizenship: Austrian
- Born: 4 January 1877 Vienna, Austria-Hungary
- Died: 17 June 1942 (aged 65) General Government, German Occupied Poland
- Occupation(s): Swimmer, fencer, lawyer, and sport official

Sport
- Country: Austria
- Sport: Swimming and fencing
- Club: 1.W.A.S.C., Vienna (Austria) / Wiener AC, Vienna (Austria)

Achievements and titles
- Olympic finals: 1896, 1912
Medal record
Representing Austria-Hungary
Men's swimming
Silver medal – second place	1896 Athens	100 m freestyle
Men's fencing
Silver medal – second place	1912 Stockholm	Team sabre

Dr. Otto Herschmann (4 January 1877 – 17 June 1942) was an Austrian Jewish swimmer, fencer, lawyer, and sports official. He is one of only a few athletes who have won Olympic medals in multiple sports, having received a silver medal in swimming in 1896 and a silver medal in fencing in 1912. He also worked as a lawyer, and served as president of the Austrian Olympic Committee and the Austrian Swimming Federation. Herschmann was murdered by the Nazis in 1942 during The Holocaust.

== Biography ==
Herschmann was Jewish, and was born in Vienna, Austria. He was affiliated with the 1.W.A.S.C. in Vienna, and the Wiener AC in Vienna.

=== Olympic swimming career ===
Herschmann first competed at the initial modern Olympic Games, the 1896 Summer Olympics in Athens, Greece, at the age of 19 in the men's 100 metres freestyle swimming event. On 30 March, he and the other swimmers were taken by boat into the Bay of Piraeus to compete in the open sea. The competitors swam from a starting line between two buoys, through a course marked by a number of floating hollow pumpkins, to a red flag finish line at the shore.

Herschmann placed second and won a silver medal, with a time of 1:22.8, 0.6 seconds and half a metre behind the winner, Alfréd Hajós, as the other swimmers trailed far behind.

AinsworthSports.com ranked Herschmann as tied for the second-best swimmer of the 1890s, behind Alfréd Hajós. In 1904, he wrote Wiener Sport, which was published by H. Seemann.

=== Olympic fencing career ===
In the 1906 Summer Olympics, Herschmann competed in Athens in individual sabre, but did not medal. He returned to Olympic competition at the 1912 Summer Olympics in Stockholm, Sweden, competing as a member of Austria's sabre fencing team at the age of 35, 16 years after he first won a medal. On 15 July he won a silver medal in the team competition. In so doing, he became one of only a few athletes to win Olympic medals in more than one sport.

Other Jewish fencers who participated in the 1912 Olympics included Hungarian gold medal-winning sabre fencers Dr. Jenő Fuchs, Dr. Dezső Földes, Lajos Werkner, and Dr. Oszkár Gerde, and Austrian silver medal-winning sabre fencer Albert Bogen.

=== Athletic administrative posts ===
At the time he won his fencing medal, Herschmann was serving as President of the Austrian Olympic Committee, a position that he held from 1912 to 1914. He is the only person to win an Olympic medal while serving as president of a National Olympic Committee.

Herschmann was one of Europe's top authorities in sports. In November 1913, he traveled to various cities in the United States, including Boston, New York, Cleveland, Philadelphia, and Chicago, to study US sports organizations and recruit trainers to work with Austrian athletes training for the Olympics. That month, when he was visiting the U.S. as the Austrian athletic envoy, the Boston Athletic Association gave him a banquet, and in December 1913 the Board of Governors of the New York Athletic Club held a banquet honoring him. He lauded the United States system for the quality of physical and mental training provided. He noted in contrast to the European system, high-quality training was provided to all athletes, not only those who lacked natural talent.

Herschmann served as President of the Austrian Swimming Federation from 1914 to 1932.

=== Holocaust and death ===
Herschmann was in private practice as a lawyer in the 1940s. He was persecuted during the era of the Nazis because he was Jewish. On 14 January 1942, Herschmann was deported from Vienna to the General Government region of German-occupied Poland, where he died shortly after. Some sources report that he died in Izbica transit camp, while others suggest that he was gassed in Sobibor extermination camp.

== Honors ==
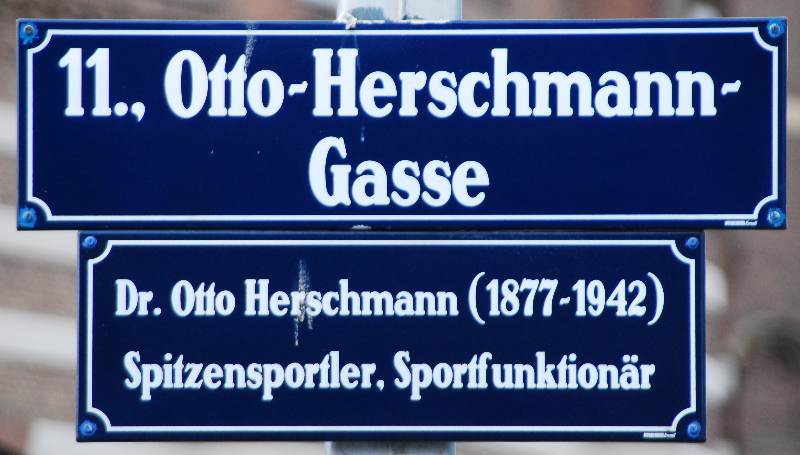
Otto-Herschmann-Gasse in Vienna, Austria

Herschmann was inducted into the International Jewish Sports Hall of Fame in 1989. On 7 November 2001 his hometown Vienna named a lane "Otto-Herschmann-Gasse" (Otto Herschmann Alley) in his honor in Simmering, the 11th District of Vienna.

== See also ==
- List of select Jewish fencers
- List of select Jewish swimmers
- List of Jewish Olympic medalists
- List of multi-sport athletes
- List of multiple Olympic medalists
