= Athletics at the 1896 Summer Olympics – Men's discus throw =

Men's discus throw at the Games of the I Olympiad
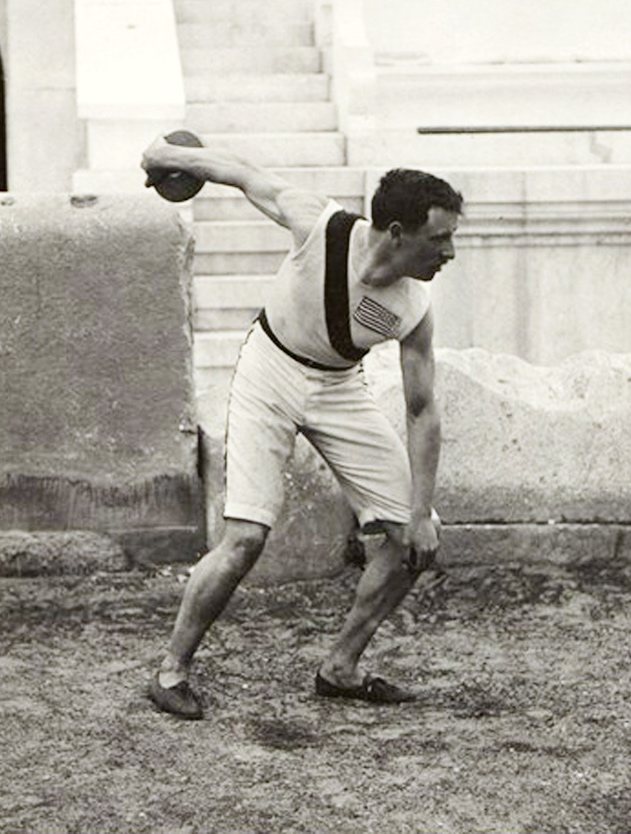
- Robert Garrett throwing the discus
- Venue: Panathinaiko Stadium
- Dates: 6 April 1896
- Competitors: 9 from 6 nations
- Winning distance: 29.15 WR

Medalists
1st place, gold medalist(s)		Robert Garrett; United States
2nd place, silver medalist(s)		Panagiotis Paraskevopoulos; Greece
3rd place, bronze medalist(s)		Sotirios Versis; Greece

The men's discus throw was one of two throwing events on the Athletics at the 1896 Summer Olympics programme. The discus throw was the fourth event (and the second final) held. It was contested on 6 April. 9 athletes competed, including one each from France, Sweden, the United States, and Great Britain as well as three Greeks and two Danes.

Many of the competitors had never thrown a discus before, as the event had never been held at an international competition. Robert Garrett of the United States was the last foreigner in the competition, and eventually defeated the famed Greek competitors to win the second modern Olympic gold medal. Garrett had practiced with a 10 kilogram discus, resulting in disappointing marks and his deciding not to compete in Athens (and competing only in the shot put, which he would win the next day); upon arrival, he learned that the actual discus weighed two kilograms and decided to compete. Greece took the second (Panagiotis Paraskevopoulos) and third (Sotirios Versis) places.

== Background ==
This was the first appearance of the event, which is one of 12 athletics events to have been held at every Summer Olympics. Thirteen athletes entered, but only nine started. Athletes from outside Greece were unfamiliar with the event, while the Greek champions (most notably Panagiotis Paraskevopoulos) were somewhat hampered by attempting to "strike poses reminiscent of the ancient Greek statues of 'diskoboloi.'"

== Competition format ==
There was a single round of throwing. Each thrower received three throws and the top three after that received two more. The throws were made from a square area with a side length of 2 to 2.5 meters. The discus weighed 2 kilograms. Throws were supposed to be made in the style of Myron's Discobolus statue, though this rule was not enforced (to the extent it would have been possible).

== Records ==
These were the standing world and Olympic records (in metres) prior to the 1896 Summer Olympics.

World record	Erik Eriksson (SWE)^{*}	35.74 m (117 ft 3 in)	Stockholm	6 October 1895
Olympic record	N/A	N/A	N/A	N/A

^{*} unofficial

The following record was established during the competition:

Date	Event	Athlete	Nation	Distance (m)	Record
April 6	Final	Robert Garrett	United States	29.15	OR

== Schedule ==
Date		Time	Round
Gregorian	Julian	Time	Round
Monday, 6 April 1896	Monday, 25 March 1896	16:25	Final

== Results ==
As with many of the 1896 events, the results are incomplete and disputed. The list below is per Olympedia. The IOC webpage has these 9 competitors, placing Papasideris 5th, Robertson 6th, and Sjöberg 7th (with no 4th place finisher listed). The Official Report says there were 11 competitors, though it is often unclear whether it means those who entered or who actually competed. The nationality of the two additional men are given as German and Danish, so the Official Report appears to include Schuhmann and Winckler. Megede replaces Grisel with an "A. Adler" of France, placing him 4th, follows the IOC webpage placement of Papasideris, Robertson, and Sjöberg, and includes Schuhmann and Winckler as having competed.

Rank	Athlete	Nation	1	2	3	4	5	Distance	Notes
1st place, gold medalist(s)	Robert Garrett	United States	27.53	X	Unknown	28.72	29.15 OR	29.15	OR
2nd place, silver medalist(s)	Panagiotis Paraskevopoulos	Greece	28.51	Unknown	Unknown	28.88	28.95 OR	28.95	
3rd place, bronze medalist(s)	Sotirios Versis	Greece	Unknown	Unknown	Unknown	Unknown	Unknown	27.78	
4	George S. Robertson	Great Britain	Unknown	Unknown	Unknown	did not advance		25.20	
5–9	Adolphe Grisel	France	Unknown	Unknown	Unknown	did not advance		Unknown	
5–9	Viggo Jensen	Denmark	Unknown	Unknown	Unknown	did not advance		Unknown	
5–9	Holger Nielsen	Denmark	Unknown	Unknown	Unknown	did not advance		Unknown	
5–9	Georgios Papasideris	Greece	Unknown	Unknown	Unknown	did not advance		Unknown	
5–9	Henrik Sjöberg	Sweden	Unknown	Unknown	Unknown	did not advance		Unknown	
—	Louis Adler	France	DNS						
—	Carl Schuhmann	Germany	DNS						
—	Charles Vanoni	United States	DNS						
—	Charles Winckler	Denmark	DNS						

== Sources ==
- Lampros, S.P.; Polites, N.G.; De Coubertin, Pierre; Philemon, P.J. & Anninos, C. (1897). The Olympic Games: BC 776 – AD 1896. Athens: Charles Beck. (Digitally available at la84foundation.org)
- Mallon, Bill & Widlund, Ture (1998). The 1896 Olympic Games. Results for All Competitors in All Events, with Commentary. Jefferson: McFarland. ISBN 0-7864-0379-9. (Excerpt available at la84foundation.org)
- Smith, Michael Llewellyn (2004). Olympics in Athens 1896. The Invention of the Modern Olympic Games. London: Profile Books. ISBN 1-86197-342-X.
