= Ellery Harding Clark =

American track and field athlete

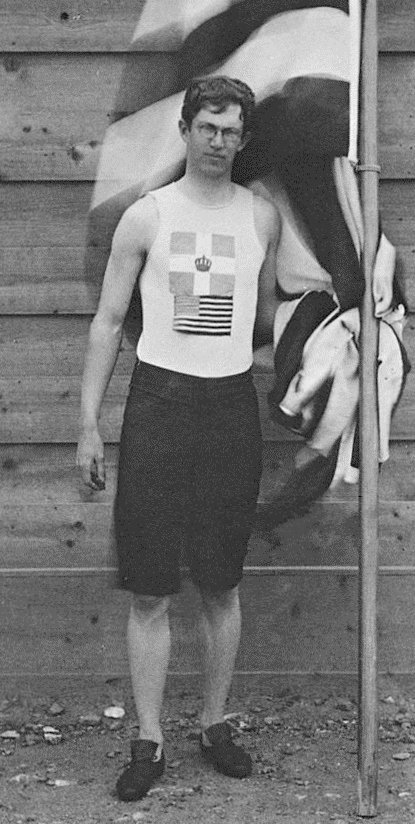
- Ellery Clark in 1896

Personal information
- Born: March 13, 1874 West Roxbury, Massachusetts, U.S.
- Died: July 27, 1949 (aged 75) near Hingham, Massachusetts, U.S.
- Education: Harvard University
- Height: 5 ft 10 1/2 in (179 cm)

Sport
- Sport: Athletics
- Events: High jump, long jump, triple jump, hammer throw, shot put
- Club: Boston Athletic Association

Achievements and titles
- Personal bests: HJ – 1.81 m (1896); LJ – 6.60 m (1897); TJ – 12.88 m (1895); HT – 38.48 m (1899); SP – 12.06 m (1897)
Medal record
Representing theUnited States
Olympic Games
Gold medal – first place	1896 Athens	High jump
Gold medal – first place	1896 Athens	Long jump

Ellery Harding Clark (March 13, 1874 – July 27, 1949) was an American track and field athlete and a writer. He was the first modern Olympic champion in high jump and long jump.

== Biography ==
Clark is the only person to have won both the Olympic high jump and long jump. Clark achieved it in 1896, at the first modern Olympics in Athens. A Harvard student, he was given a leave of absence to compete because of his high grades - in contrast to another gold medal winner from Harvard, James Connolly. Clark was one of the top all-around athletes from 1893 to 1912.

In the long jump, Clark had used his hat to mark his runway. Twice the judge (King Constantine of Greece) had removed the hat, saying this was a practice of professionals. Only at the third attempt, and without the hat, did Clark achieve a valid jump, good enough for gold. His final jump was of 6.35 meters. Clark later won the high jump as well, clearing 1.81 meters. The closest competitors were fellow Americans Connolly and Robert Garrett at 1.65 meters. In the shot put, Clark was among the bottom three of the seven-man field.

He never won a national championship in either jump, but he was the 1897 and 1903 AAU champion in the all-around, an event similar to the decathlon. He won the 1897 American all-around championship with performances that would have won him the 1896 Olympic high jump, long jump, and shot put, and probably the 100 metres and the 110 metres hurdles as well.

Ellery also competed in the 1904 Olympics in St. Louis, in the all-around competition. Although he had to abandon the contest after five events due to bronchitis, he was still classed sixth. At age 32, he was still winning major meets. He competed as a walker until the age of 56.

Clark's professional life was equally varied. He excelled as an author, lawyer, track coach, teacher and Boston city alderman. He wrote 19 books including one which was made into a 1952 film, Caribbean.

In 1904 he married Mary Victoria Maddelena, a Swiss. The engagement and subsequent marriage caused something of a stir in the press - Clark was a millionaire and Maddalena was from the 'South end slums'.

In 1949, he died at the age 75 on a train en route from Boston to his home at Cohasset.

Clark was inducted into the USATF Hall of Fame in 1991.
