= Robert Garrett =

United States athlete (1875–1961)

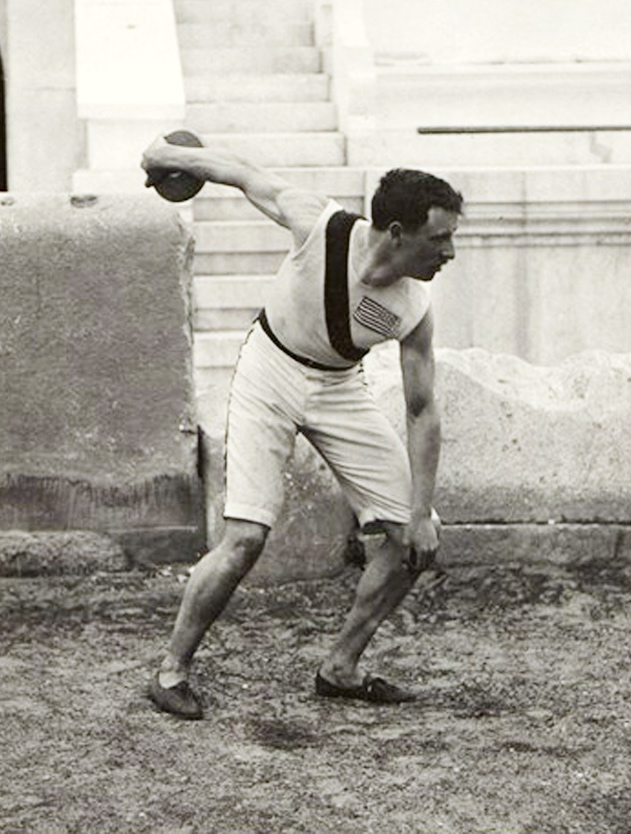
- Garrett with the discus at the 1896 Olympics

Personal information
- Born: May 24, 1875 Baltimore County, Maryland, U.S.
- Died: April 25, 1961 (aged 85) Baltimore, Maryland, U.S.
- Height: 1.88 m (6 ft 2 in)
- Weight: 81 kg (179 lb; 12.8 st)

Sport
- Sport: Athletics
Medal record
Men's athletics
Representing the United States
Olympic Games
Gold medal – first place	1896 Athens	Shot put
Gold medal – first place	1896 Athens	Discus throw
Silver medal – second place	1896 Athens	High jump
Silver medal – second place	1896 Athens	Long jump
Bronze medal – third place	1900 Paris	Shot put
Bronze medal – third place	1900 Paris	Standing triple jump

Robert S. Garrett (May 24, 1875 – April 25, 1961) was an American athlete, as well as investment banker and philanthropist in Baltimore, Maryland and financier of several important archeological excavations. Garrett was the first modern Olympic champion in discus throw as well as shot put. With six Olympic medals, he is one of the most successful track and field Olympians of all time.

== Early and family life ==
Robert S. Garrett was born in then rural/suburban Baltimore County, Maryland (which surrounds the City of Baltimore) into one of Maryland's most prominent and wealthy families. For four generations, the Garretts ran Robert Garrett and Sons, a shipping and financing, investment banking firm founded by his Irish immigrant great-grandfather, also named Robert Garrett, in 1819. His grandfather John Work Garrett (1820–1884) had led the Baltimore and Ohio Railroad (the first passenger railroad line established in America, 1827–1828), for nearly three decades (1858–1884), including supporting the Union during the American Civil War (1861–1865), making it by the middle of the 19th century as one of the most important lines in the nation, and also became an important philanthropist in Baltimore. His father was Thomas Harrison Garrett (1849–1888), and his mother the former Alice Dickerson Whitridge (1851–1920); his elder brother John Work Garrett (1872–1942) became a distinguished American diplomat for the United States Department of State.

Like his elder brother, Robert Garrett studied at Princeton University, in Princeton, New Jersey, where he excelled in track and field athletics as an undergraduate, and captained Princeton's track team in both his junior and senior years. Garrett married Katharine Barker Johnson (1885–1961), who survived him by less than a year. They had two sons and three daughters by 1920. Although their first daughter and son both died as infants, and their youngest son, a United States Army Air Corps pilot Lt. John Work Garrett (1924–1944) died during World War II (1939/1941–1945), and sons Harrison Garrett (1911–1994) and Johnson Garrett (1912–1979) survived their parents, as did daughters Katharine Garrett Bainbridge (1914–1999) and Ella Brock Johnson Garrett Brigham (1917–2006).

== Athletic career ==
As an undergraduate, Garrett was primarily a shot-putter, though he also competed in the jumping events. When he decided to compete in the famous first modern Olympic games (First Olympiad) being revived and held in Athens, Greece, in 1896, Professor William Milligan Sloane suggested that Garrett also try the discus. They consulted classical authorities to develop a drawing and Garrett hired a blacksmith to make a discus. It weighed nearly 30 pounds (14 kg) and was impossible to throw any distance, so he gave up on the idea. Garrett paid for his own and three classmates' travel to Athens to compete in the games. Francis Lane would finish third in 100 m, Herbert Jamison finished second in 400 m, and Albert Tyler placed second in pole vault. When Garrett discovered that a real discus weighed less than five pounds (2.3 kg), he decided to enter the event for fun.

=== 1896 First Olympics ===
The three Greek discus throwers among the eleven men entered in the event were true stylists. Each throw, as they spun and rose from a classical Discobolus stance, was intended to be beautiful. Garrett threw the discus with tremendous force using a style more similar to the hammer throw, after seizing the discus in his right hand and swinging himself around and around. Garrett's first two throws were clumsy. Instead of sailing parallel to the ground, the discus turned over and over and narrowly missed hitting audience members. Both foreigners and Americans laughed at his efforts, and Garrett joined in the general merriment. His final throw, however, punctuated with a loud grunt, sent the discus sailing 19 centimetres (7.5 in) beyond the second-place throw (by Panagiotis Paraskevopoulos) mark at 29.15 metres (95 ft 8 in).

American spectator Burton Holmes wrote: "All were stupefied. The Greeks had been defeated at their own classic exercise. They were overwhelmed by the superior skill and daring of the Americans, to whom they ascribed a supernatural invincibility enabling them to dispense with training and to win at games which they had never before seen." According to James Connolly, the winning Americans in five of the track and field events had not had a single day of outdoor practice since the previous fall.

Garrett also won the shot put with a distance of 11.22 metres (36 ft 10 in) and finished second in the high jump (tied equally with James Connolly at 1.65 metres (5 ft 5 in)) and second in the long jump (with a jump of 6.00 metres (19 ft 8 in)).

=== 1900 Second Olympics ===
In the subsequent 1900 Olympics four years later, Garrett competed again and placed third in the shot put and the standing triple jump. His bronze medal in the shot put was unusual, as he refused to compete in the final because it was on a Sunday, his religious day of rest. However, his qualifying mark was good enough to place Garrett in third place. He also competed in the discus throw again, but due to a poorly planned course was unable to set a legal mark as all of his discus throws hit trees.

Garrett was also a member of the Tug-of-War team at the 1900 Olympics that was forced to withdraw because three of the six members were engaged in the hammer throw final.

== Baltimore banker and civic leader ==
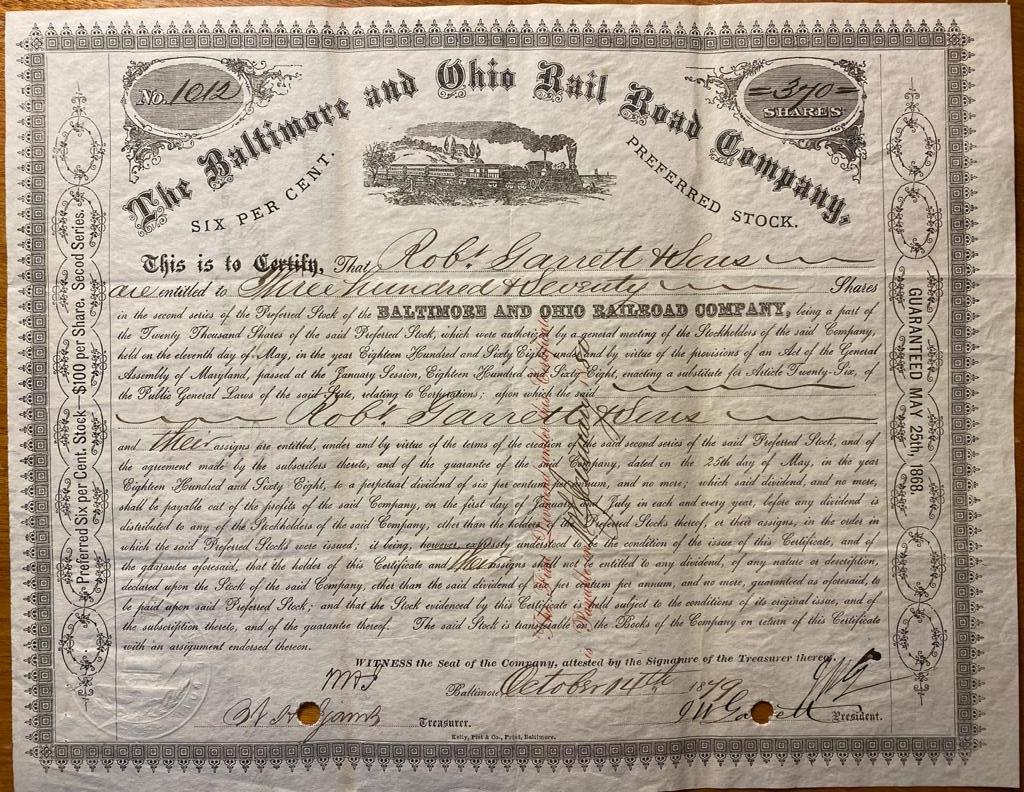
Share of the Baltimore and Ohio Rail-Road Company, issued October 14, 1879

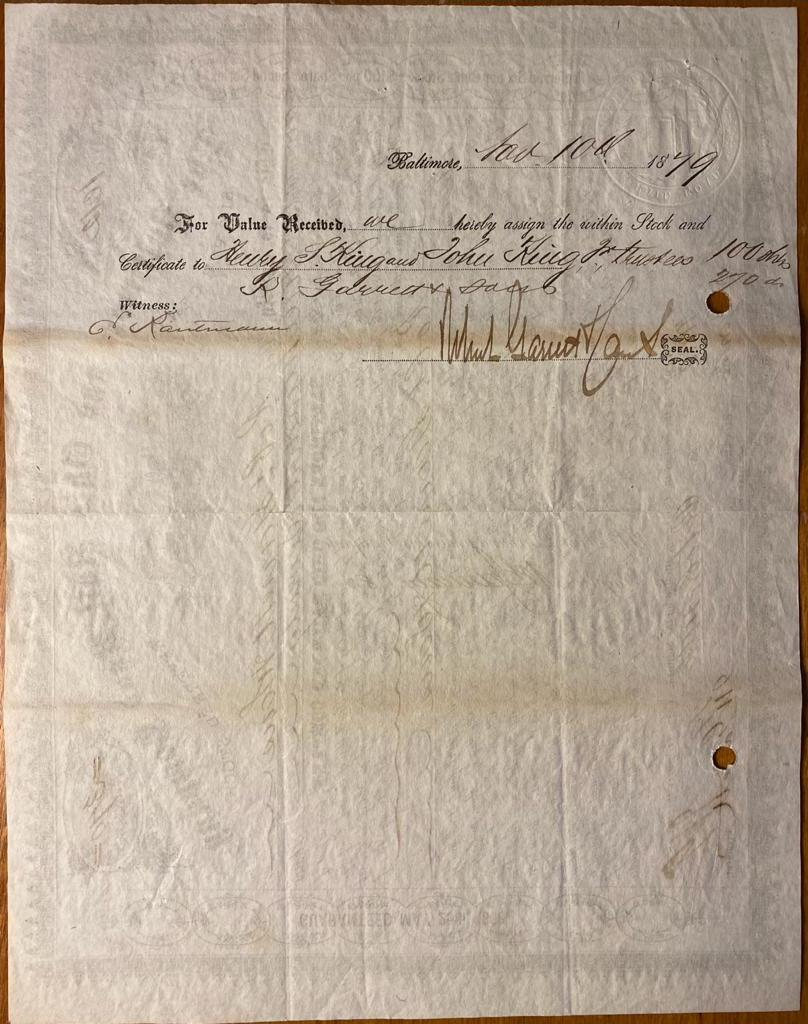
1879 B&O Railroad stock certificate (back) signed by Robert Garrett

Garrett later became a banker and financier at his grandfather's historic mercantile firm, Robert Garrett and Sons, at their landmark office building on the southwest corner of South and Water Streets in downtown Baltimore. He was an investor in the B&O Railroad.

=== Archeology and manuscripts ===
Garrett had an early intensive interest in science, especially in history and archeology, and became an early collector and important donor. He helped to organize and finance an archaeological expedition to Syria, led by Dr. John M. T. Finney. From 1932 to 1939, he was involved with the Committee for the Excavation of Antioch and Its Vicinity both helping to fund the excavations and working on them. Garrett's hobby was collecting medieval and Renaissance manuscripts. Garrett amassed a collection of historical volumes of Western and non-Western manuscripts, fragments, and scrolls, originating from Europe, the Near East, Africa, Asia and Mesoamerica, ca. 1340 B.C. – A.D. 1900s.

He inherited his collecting interest from his father, Thomas Harrison Garrett. After his father's sudden death in 1888, Robert spent the following two and a half years traveling extensively with his mother and two brothers, Horatio and John, in Europe and the Near East. During his travels Garrett developed a particular interest in manuscripts and began collecting. He used the text Universal Paleography: or, Facsimiles of Writing of All Nations and Periods by J. B. Silvester (by Sir Frederic Madden, London, 1949–50) as his guide for collecting primary examples of every known type of script.

Garrett was for many years an enthusiastic alumnus and served as trustee of Princeton University and also on the governing board of the Baltimore Museum of Art, founded in 1914 by his aunt Mary Elizabeth Garrett, (1857-1915), and working in the relocation and construction project of their new museum building designed by famous American architect John Russell Pope (1874-1937), on Art Museum Drive, off of North Charles Street, and adjacent to the also newly located Homewood Campus of Johns Hopkins University. In 1942, Garrett donated his collection of more than 11,000 manuscripts to Princeton University, including the "Aksum Scrolls" and sixteen Byzantine Greek manuscripts, containing rare examples of illuminated Byzantine art.

=== Baltimore activist ===
Through a mayoral appointment, Garrett served as the chairman of the city's Public Improvement Commission. He was also largely responsible for bringing the new Boy Scouts of America youth organization to Baltimore in 1910, shortly after its national establishment and imported from Great Britain with founder. He managed the BSA in Baltimore until his retirement in 1934. In 1919, Garrett gave to the City of Baltimore a tract of land of a city block along East Patapsco Avenue, between Second and Third Streets in its recently annexed Brooklyn neighborhood in South Baltimore to be used as a public park, which was named in his honor.

Garrett helped develop Baltimore's public recreational facilities, many of which were privately funded by himself, colleagues and friends. Garrett organized the Public Athletic League which later merged with a similar earlier Children's Playground Association. He was the first chairman of Baltimore City's Bureau of Recreation, and the first chairman of the city's Board of Park Commissioners for the combined Department of Recreation and Parks. Garrett was through much of his life an active member of the National Recreation Association, and was elected its chairman in 1941.

In the Baltimore mayoral campaign of 1947, both the Republican and Democratic nominees promised that, if elected, they would name Garrett as chairman of the city's Department of Recreation and Parks. A devout Presbyterian throughout his life, he was a member of their national convention - the General Assembly of the Presbyterian Church in the United States, and was recognized in 1948 as the year's outstanding layperson in the field of religious education by the International Council of Religious Education.

In the realm of civil rights for African-Americans, Garrett was a staunch conservative and opposed any racial integration of the city's public facilities in its parks, playgrounds, swimming pools, tennis courts and recreation centers. Controversies increased as the national civil rights movement expanded in the late 1940s and 1950s. Garrett was later asked to resign from the Board of Park Commissioners when a positive vote for integration was taken.

== Death and legacy ==
Garrett died on April 25, 1961, in Baltimore, Maryland He was buried at Baltimore's Green Mount Cemetery. His widow died the year prior. As noted above, the Garrett Park recreation area in Baltimore City's Brooklyn neighborhood, on East Patapsco Avenue, between Second and Third Streets, was donated and named for him. He donated his papers to Princeton University; the Library of Congress also has family papers

In the 1984 NBC television two-part miniseries, The First Olympics: Athens 1896, Garrett was portrayed by actor Hunt Block. In the second episode, Garrett was incorrectly portrayed as being a participant in the first Olympic Marathon.

== See also ==
- List of Princeton University Olympians
