= Individual sprint at the Olympics =

Sprint (track cycling) at the Olympic Games
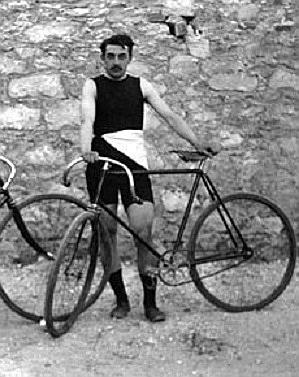
- The first individual sprint winner, Paul Masson, in 1896

Overview
- Sport: Cycling
- Gender: Men and women
- Years held: Men: 1896–1900, 1908, 1920–2024; Women: 1988–2024

Reigning champion
- Men: Harrie Lavreysen (NED)
- Women: Ellesse Andrews (NZL)

The individual sprint is a track cycling event held at the Summer Olympics. The event was first held for men at the first modern Olympics in 1896. It was held again in 1900, but not in 1904 when various races at different distances were conducted. The men's sprint returned to the programme in 1908 but was again omitted in 1912, when only road cycling competitions were held. After World War I, the men's sprint returned to the programme for good in 1920 and has been held every Games since. The women's sprint was added when women's track cycling was first held in 1988 and has been held every Games since.

== Medalists ==
=== Men ===
Games	Gold	Silver	Bronze
1896 Athens	Paul Masson; France	Stamatios Nikolopoulos; Greece	Léon Flameng; France
1900 Paris	Albert Taillandier; France	Fernand Sanz; France	John Henry Lake; United States
1908 London	Not awarded	Not awarded	Not awarded
1920 Antwerp	Maurice Peeters; Netherlands	Thomas Johnson; Great Britain	Harry Ryan; Great Britain
1924 Paris	Lucien Michard; France	Jacob Meijer; Netherlands	Jean Cugnot; France
1928 Amsterdam	Roger Beaufrand; France	Antoine Mazairac; Netherlands	Willy Hansen; Denmark
1932 Los Angeles	Jacobus van Egmond; Netherlands	Louis Chaillot; France	Bruno Pellizzari; Italy
1936 Berlin	Toni Merkens; Germany	Arie van Vliet; Netherlands	Louis Chaillot; France
1948 London	Mario Ghella; Italy	Reg Harris; Great Britain	Axel Schandorff; Denmark
1952 Helsinki	Enzo Sacchi; Italy	Lionel Cox; Australia	Werner Potzernheim; Germany
1956 Melbourne	Michel Rousseau; France	Guglielmo Pesenti; Italy	Dick Ploog; Australia
1960 Rome	Sante Gaiardoni; Italy	Leo Sterckx; Belgium	Valentino Gasparella; Italy
1964 Tokyo	Giovanni Pettenella; Italy	Sergio Bianchetto; Italy	Daniel Morelon; France
1968 Mexico City	Daniel Morelon; France	Giordano Turrini; Italy	Pierre Trentin; France
1972 Munich	Daniel Morelon; France	John Nicholson; Australia	Omar Pkhakadze; Soviet Union
1976 Montreal	Anton Tkáč; Czechoslovakia	Daniel Morelon; France	Jürgen Geschke; East Germany
1980 Moscow	Lutz Heßlich; East Germany	Yavé Cahard; France	Sergei Kopylov; Soviet Union
1984 Los Angeles	Mark Gorski; United States	Nelson Vails; United States	Tsutomu Sakamoto; Japan
1988 Seoul	Lutz Heßlich; East Germany	Nikolai Kovsh; Soviet Union	Gary Neiwand; Australia
1992 Barcelona	Jens Fiedler; Germany	Gary Neiwand; Australia	Curt Harnett; Canada
1996 Atlanta	Jens Fiedler; Germany	Marty Nothstein; United States	Curt Harnett; Canada
2000 Sydney	Marty Nothstein; United States	Florian Rousseau; France	Jens Fiedler; Germany
2004 Athens	Ryan Bayley; Australia	Theo Bos; Netherlands	René Wolff; Germany
2008 Beijing	Chris Hoy; Great Britain	Jason Kenny; Great Britain	Mickaël Bourgain; France
2012 London	Jason Kenny; Great Britain	Grégory Baugé; France	Shane Perkins; Australia
2016 Rio de Janeiro	Jason Kenny; Great Britain	Callum Skinner; Great Britain	Denis Dmitriev; Russia
2020 Tokyo	Harrie Lavreysen; Netherlands	Jeffrey Hoogland; Netherlands	Jack Carlin; Great Britain
2024 Paris	Harrie Lavreysen; Netherlands	Matthew Richardson; Australia	Jack Carlin; Great Britain

==== Multiple medalists ====
Rank	Cyclist	Nation	Olympics	Gold	Silver	Bronze	Total
1	Daniel Morelon	France	1964–1976	2	1	1	4
2	Jason Kenny	Great Britain	2008–2016	2	1	0	3
3	Jens Fiedler	Germany	1992–2000	2	0	1	3
4	Lutz Heßlich	East Germany	1980–1988	2	0	0	2
4	Harrie Lavreysen	Netherlands	2020–2024	2	0	0	2
6	Marty Nothstein	United States	1996–2000	1	1	0	2
7	Gary Neiwand	Australia	1988–1992	0	1	1	2
7	Louis Chaillot	France	1932–1936	0	1	1	2
9	Curt Harnett	Canada	1992–1996	0	0	2	2
9	Jack Carlin	Great Britain	2020–2024	0	0	2	2

==== Medalists by country ====
Rank	Nation	Gold	Silver	Bronze	Total
1	France	7	6	6	20
2	Netherlands	4	5	0	9
3	Italy	4	3	2	9
4	Great Britain	3	4	3	10
5	Germany	3	0	3	6
6	United States	2	2	1	5
7	East Germany	2	0	1	3
8	Australia	1	4	3	8
9	Czechoslovakia	1	0	0	1
10	Soviet Union	0	1	2	3
11	Belgium	0	1	0	1
11	Greece	0	1	0	1
13	Canada	0	0	2	2
13	Denmark	0	0	2	2
15	Japan	0	0	1	1
15	Russia	0	0	1	1

=== Women ===
Games	Gold	Silver	Bronze
1988 Seoul	Erika Salumäe; Soviet Union	Christa Luding-Rothenburger; East Germany	Connie Paraskevin; United States
1992 Barcelona	Erika Salumäe; Estonia	Annett Neumann; Germany	Ingrid Haringa; Netherlands
1996 Atlanta	Felicia Ballanger; France	Michelle Ferris; Australia	Ingrid Haringa; Netherlands
2000 Sydney	Felicia Ballanger; France	Oxana Grichina; Russia	Iryna Yanovych; Ukraine
2004 Athens	Lori-Ann Muenzer; Canada	Tamilla Abassova; Russia	Anna Meares; Australia
2008 Beijing	Victoria Pendleton; Great Britain	Anna Meares; Australia	Guo Shuang; China
2012 London	Anna Meares; Australia	Victoria Pendleton; Great Britain	Guo Shuang; China
2016 Rio de Janeiro	Kristina Vogel; Germany	Becky James; Great Britain	Katy Marchant; Great Britain
2020 Tokyo	Kelsey Mitchell; Canada	Olena Starikova; Ukraine	Lee Wai-sze; Hong Kong
2024 Paris	Ellesse Andrews; New Zealand	Lea Friedrich; Germany	Emma Finucane; Great Britain

==== Multiple medalists ====
Rank	Cyclist	Nation	Olympics	Gold	Silver	Bronze	Total
1	Erika Salumäe	Soviet Union; Estonia	1988–1992	2	0	0	2
1	Felicia Ballanger	France	1996–2000	2	0	0	0
3	Anna Meares	Australia	2004–2012	1	1	1	3
4	Victoria Pendleton	Great Britain	2008–2012	1	1	0	2
5	Ingrid Haringa	Netherlands	1992–1996	0	0	2	2
5	Guo Shuang	China	2008–2012	0	0	2	2

==== Medalists by country ====
Rank	Nation	Gold	Silver	Bronze	Total
1	Canada	2	0	0	2
1	France	2	0	0	2
3	Australia	1	2	1	4
4	Great Britain	1	2	1	4
5	Germany	1	1	0	2
6	Estonia	1	0	0	1
6	New Zealand	1	0	0	1
6	Soviet Union	1	0	0	1
9	Russia	0	2	0	2
10	Ukraine	0	1	1	2
11	East Germany	0	1	0	1
12	China	0	0	2	2
12	Netherlands	0	0	2	2
14	Hong Kong	0	0	1	1

== Intercalated Games ==
The 1906 Intercalated Games were held in Athens and at the time were officially recognised as part of the Olympic Games series, with the intention being to hold a games in Greece in two-year intervals between the internationally held Olympics. However, this plan never came to fruition and the International Olympic Committee (IOC) later decided not to recognise these games as part of the official Olympic series. Some sports historians continue to treat the results of these games as part of the Olympic canon.

Francesco Verri of Italy won the 1906 title, with Bert Bouffler of Great Britain in second and Eugène Debongnie of Belgium third.

Games	Gold	Silver	Bronze
1906 Athens	Francesco Verri (ITA)	Bert Bouffler (GBR)	Eugène Debongnie (BEL)
