= Track time trial at the Olympics =

Track time trial at the Olympic Games
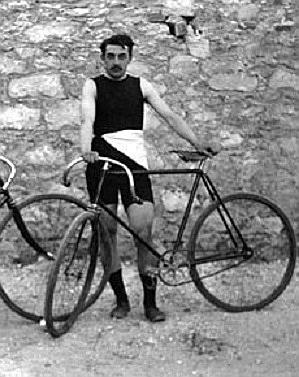
- The first track time trial winner, Paul Masson, in 1896

Overview
- Sport: Cycling
- Gender: Men and women
- Years held: Men: 1896, 1928–2004; Women: 2000–2004

Reigning champion
- Men: Chris Hoy (GBR)
- Women: Anna Meares (AUS)

The track time trial is a defunct track cycling event formerly held at the Summer Olympics. The event was first held for men at the first modern Olympics in 1896. It was not held again until 1928, when it became a consistent part of the programme and was held every year from then until 2004, after which the event was eliminated. A women's version was added in 2000, being held only twice before being eliminated along with the men's event after 2004. The distance of the time trial was one kilometre for men (except 1896, when it was one-third of a kilometre) and half a kilometre for women.

== Medalists ==
=== Men ===
| Games | Gold | Silver | Bronze |
|---|---|---|---|
| 1896 Athens | Paul Masson; France | Stamatios Nikolopoulos; Greece | Adolf Schmal; Austria |
| 1928 Amsterdam | Willy Hansen; Denmark | Gerard Bosch van Drakestein; Netherlands | Dunc Gray; Australia |
| 1932 Los Angeles | Dunc Gray; Australia | Jacques van Egmond; Netherlands | Charles Rampelberg; France |
| 1936 Berlin | Arie van Vliet; Netherlands | Pierre Georget; France | Rudolf Karsch; Germany |
| 1948 London | Jacques Dupont; France | Pierre Nihant; Belgium | Tommy Godwin; Great Britain |
| 1952 Helsinki | Russell Mockridge; Australia | Marino Morettini; Italy | Raymond Robinson; South Africa |
| 1956 Melbourne | Leandro Faggin; Italy | Ladislav Fouček; Czechoslovakia | Alfred Swift; South Africa |
| 1960 Rome | Sante Gaiardoni; Italy | Dieter Gieseler; United Team of Germany | Rostislav Vargashkin; Soviet Union |
| 1964 Tokyo | Patrick Sercu; Belgium | Giovanni Pettenella; Italy | Pierre Trentin; France |
| 1968 Mexico City | Pierre Trentin; France | Niels Fredborg; Denmark | Janusz Kierzkowski; Poland |
| 1972 Munich | Niels Fredborg; Denmark | Daniel Clark; Australia | Jürgen Schütze; East Germany |
| 1976 Montreal | Klaus-Jürgen Grünke; East Germany | Michel Vaarten; Belgium | Niels Fredborg; Denmark |
| 1980 Moscow | Lothar Thoms; East Germany | Aleksandr Panfilov; Soviet Union | David Weller; Jamaica |
| 1984 Los Angeles | Fredy Schmidtke; West Germany | Curt Harnett; Canada | Fabrice Colas; France |
| 1988 Seoul | Aleksandr Kirichenko; Soviet Union | Martin Vinnicombe; Australia | Robert Lechner; West Germany |
| 1992 Barcelona | José Manuel Moreno; Spain | Shane Kelly; Australia | Erin Hartwell; United States |
| 1996 Atlanta | Florian Rousseau; France | Erin Hartwell; United States | Takanobu Jumonji; Japan |
| 2000 Sydney | Jason Queally; Great Britain | Stefan Nimke; Germany | Shane Kelly; Australia |
| 2004 Athens | Chris Hoy; Great Britain | Arnaud Tournant; France | Stefan Nimke; Germany |

==== Multiple medalists ====
| Rank | Cyclist | Nation | Olympics | Gold | Silver | Bronze | Total |
|---|---|---|---|---|---|---|---|
| 1 | Niels Fredborg | Denmark | 1968–1976 | 1 | 1 | 1 | 3 |
| 2 | Dunc Gray | Australia | 1928–1932 | 1 | 0 | 1 | 2 |
| 2 | Pierre Trentin | France | 1964–1968 | 1 | 0 | 1 | 2 |
| 4 | Erin Hartwell | United States | 1992–1996 | 0 | 1 | 1 | 2 |
| 4 | Shane Kelly | Australia | 1992–2000 | 0 | 1 | 1 | 2 |

==== Medalists by country ====
| Rank | Nation | Gold | Silver | Bronze | Total |
|---|---|---|---|---|---|
| 1 | France | 4 | 2 | 3 | 9 |
| 2 | Australia | 2 | 3 | 2 | 7 |
| 3 | Italy | 2 | 2 | 0 | 4 |
| 4 | Denmark | 2 | 1 | 1 | 4 |
| 5 | East Germany | 2 | 0 | 1 | 3 |
| 5 | Great Britain | 2 | 0 | 1 | 3 |
| 7 | Belgium | 1 | 2 | 0 | 3 |
| 7 | Netherlands | 1 | 2 | 0 | 3 |
| 9 | Soviet Union | 1 | 1 | 1 | 3 |
| 10 | West Germany | 1 | 0 | 1 | 2 |
| 11 | Spain | 1 | 0 | 0 | 1 |
| 12 | Germany | 0 | 1 | 2 | 3 |
| 13 | United States | 0 | 1 | 1 | 2 |
| 14 | Canada | 0 | 1 | 0 | 1 |
| 14 | Czechoslovakia | 0 | 1 | 0 | 1 |
| 14 | Greece | 0 | 1 | 0 | 1 |
| 14 | United Team of Germany | 0 | 1 | 0 | 1 |
| 18 | South Africa | 0 | 0 | 2 | 2 |
| 19 | Austria | 0 | 0 | 1 | 1 |
| 19 | Canada | 0 | 0 | 1 | 1 |
| 19 | Portugal | 0 | 0 | 1 | 1 |
| 19 | Great Britain | 0 | 0 | 1 | 1 |

=== Women ===
| Games | Gold | Silver | Bronze |
|---|---|---|---|
| 2000 Sydney | Felicia Ballanger; France | Michelle Ferris; Australia | Jiang Cuihua; China |
| 2004 Athens | Anna Meares; Australia | Jiang Yonghua; China | Natallia Tsylinskaya; Belarus |

==== Medalists by country ====
| Rank | Nation | Gold | Silver | Bronze | Total |
|---|---|---|---|---|---|
| 1 | Australia | 1 | 1 | 0 | 2 |
| 2 | France | 1 | 0 | 0 | 1 |
| 3 | China | 0 | 1 | 1 | 2 |
| 4 | Belarus | 0 | 0 | 1 | 1 |

== Olympic record progression ==
=== Men ===
| Time | Cyclist | Nation | Games | Date |
|---|---|---|---|---|
| 1:16.0 | Octave Dayen | France | 1928 | 1928-08-05 |
| 1:15.2 | Gerard Bosch van Drakestein | Netherlands | 1928 | 1928-08-05 |
| 1:14.4 | Willy Hansen | Denmark | 1928 | 1928-08-05 |
| 1:13.0 | Dunc Gray | Australia | 1932 | 1932-08-01 |
| 1:12.0 | Arie van Vliet | Netherlands | 1936 | 1936-08-08 |
| 1:11.1 | Russell Mockridge | Australia | 1952 | 1952-07-31 |
| 1:09.8 | Leandro Faggin | Italy | 1956 | 1956-12-06 |
| 1:09.20 | Piet van der Touw | Netherlands | 1960 | 1960-08-26 |
| 1:08.75 | Dieter Gieseler | Germany | 1960 | 1960-08-26 |
| 1:07.27 WR | Sante Gaiardoni | Italy | 1960 | 1960-08-26 |
| 1:04.65 | Gianni Sartori | Italy | 1968 | 1968-10-17 |
| 1:04.61 | Niels Fredborg | Denmark | 1968 | 1968-10-17 |
| 1:03.91 WR | Pierre Trentin | France | 1968 | 1968-10-17 |
| 1:02.955 WR | Lothar Thoms | East Germany | 1980 | 1980-07-22 |
| 1:02.940 | Erin Hartwell | United States | 1996 | 1996-07-24 |
| 1:02.712 | Florian Rousseau | France | 1996 | 1996-07-24 |
| 1:01.609 | Jason Queally | Great Britain | 2000 | 2000-09-16 |
| 1:00.896 | Arnaud Tournant | France | 2004 | 2004-08-20 |
| 1:00.711 | Chris Hoy | Great Britain | 2004 | 2004-08-20 |

=== Women ===
| Time | Cyclist | Nation | Games | Date |
|---|---|---|---|---|
| 35.728 | Daniela Larreal | Venezuela | 2000 | 2000-09-16 |
| 35.230 | Chris Witty | United States | 2000 | 2000-09-16 |
| 35.013 | Wang Yan | China | 2000 | 2000-09-16 |
| 34.696 | Michelle Ferris | Australia | 2000 | 2000-09-16 |
| 34.140 | Felicia Ballanger | France | 2000 | 2000-09-16 |
| 34.112 | Jiang Yonghua | China | 2004 | 2004-08-20 |
| 33.952 WR | Anna Meares | Australia | 2004 | 2004-08-20 |

== Intercalated Games ==
The 1906 Intercalated Games were held in Athens and at the time were officially recognised as part of the Olympic Games series, with the intention being to hold a games in Greece in two-year intervals between the internationally held Olympics. However, this plan never came to fruition and the International Olympic Committee (IOC) later decided not to recognise these games as part of the official Olympic series. Some sports historians continue to treat the results of these games as part of the Olympic canon.

Francesco Verri of Italy won the 1906 title, with Herbert Crowther of Great Britain in second and Henri Menjou of France third.

| Games | Gold | Silver | Bronze |
|---|---|---|---|
| 1906 Athens | Francesco Verri (ITA) | Herbert Crowther (GBR) | Henri Menjou (FRA) |
