= Cycling at the Summer Olympics =

- IOC Code: CYC (all cycling); BMF (BMX freestyle); BMX (BMX racing); MTB (mountain bike); CRD (road); CTR (track)
- Governing body: UCI
- Events: 22 (men: 11; women: 11)

Summer Olympics
- 1896; 1900; 1904; 1908; 1912; 1920; 1924; 1928; 1932; 1936; 1948; 1952; 1956; 1960; 1964; 1968; 1972; 1976; 1980; 1984; 1988; 1992; 1996; 2000; 2004; 2008; 2012; 2016; 2020; 2024; 2028; 2032
- Medalists; men; women; Records

Cycling has been contested at every Summer Olympic Games since the birth of the modern Olympic movement at the 1896 Summer Olympics, at which a road race and five track events were held. Mountain bike racing entered the Olympic programme at the Atlanta Olympics, followed by BMX racing in 2008 and freestyle BMX in 2020. Before the 2020 Summer Olympics, all events were speed races, but the 2020 programme featured BMX freestyle for the first time.

Women's road events were introduced to the Olympic programme at the 1984 Summer Olympics. Women's track events were added in 1988, and both types of events have been featured since then.

The 2012 Summer Olympics were the first at which men and women competed in the same number of events in all cycling disciplines, including track cycling, which previously had more men's and fewer women's events than the 2008 programme. However, women have shorter distances for some events.

It was proposed that cyclecross to be added in 2030 Winter Olympics, a move that was criticised by the Winter Olympic Federations as not being a ice or snow sport which would "dilute" the heritage and identity of the Winter Olympic Games.

== Summary ==
Games	Year	Events	Best Nation
1	1896	6	France (1)
2	1900	3	France (2)
3	1904	7	United States (1)
4	1908	6	Great Britain (1)
5	1912	2	Sweden (1)
6			
7	1920	6	Great Britain (2)
8	1924	6	France (3)
9	1928	6	Denmark (1)
10	1932	6	Italy (1)
11	1936	6	France (4)
12			
13			
14	1948	6	France (5)
15	1952	6	Italy (2)
16	1956	6	Italy (3)
17	1960	6	Italy (4)

Games	Year	Events	Best Nation
18	1964	7	Italy (5)
19	1968	7	France (6)
20	1972	7	Soviet Union (1)
21	1976	6	West Germany (1)
22	1980	6	Soviet Union (2)
23	1984	8	United States (2)
24	1988	9	Soviet Union (3)
25	1992	10	Germany (1)
26	1996	14	France (7)
27	2000	18	France (8)
28	2004	18	Australia (1)
29	2008	18	Great Britain (3)
30	2012	18	Great Britain (4)
31	2016	18	Great Britain (5)
32	2020	22	Great Britain (6)
33	2024	22	France (9)
34	2028	22	

== Track cycling ==
=== Men's events ===
Current programme
Event	96	00	04	08	12	20	24	28	32	36	48	52	56	60	64	68	72	76	80	84	88	92	96	00	04	08	12	16	20	24	28	Years
Keirin	Not yet introduced																							X	X	X	X	X	X	X	X	8
Madison	Not yet introduced																							X	X	X			X	X	X	6
Omnium	Not yet introduced																										X	X	X	X	X	5
Pursuit, team				X		X	X	X	X	X	X	X	X	X	X	X	X	X	X	X	X	X	X	X	X	X	X	X	X	X	X	26
Sprint, individual	X	X		X		X	X	X	X	X	X	X	X	X	X	X	X	X	X	X	X	X	X	X	X	X	X	X	X	X	X	29
Sprint, team	Not yet introduced																							X	X	X	X	X	X	X	X	8
Total	1	1	0	2	0	2	2	2	2	2	2	2	2	2	2	2	2	2	2	2	2	2	2	5	5	5	5	5	6	6	6	

Past events that occurred once or twice

- 50 kilometres: 1920, 1924
- 100 kilometres: 1896, 1908

Only at the 1896 Summer Olympics

- 12 hours
- 1/3 of 1 km time trial

Only at the 1904 Summer Olympics

- 1/4 mile
- 1/3 mile
- 1/2 mile
- 1 mile
- 2 miles
- 5 miles
- 25 miles

Only at the 1908 Summer Olympics

- 660 yards
- 5 kilometres (5000 metres)
- 10 kilometres
- 20 kilometres
- 25 kilometres

Past events that occurred seven or more times
Event	96	00	04	08	12	20	24	28	32	36	48	52	56	60	64	68	72	76	80	84	88	92	96	00	04	08	12	16	20	24	28	Years
Points race		X	Not yet reintroduced																	X	X	X	X	X	X	X	Part of omnium since					7
Pursuit, individual	Not yet introduced														X	X	X	X	X	X	X	X	X	X	X	X	Not occurred since					12
Tandem				X		X	X	X	X	X	X	X	X	X	X	X	X	Not occurred since														13
1 km time trial	(Note: The 1896 time trial was the only time the event was held over one-third of a kilometre rather than one kilometre)	Not yet reintroduced						X	X	X	X	X	X	X	X	X	X	X	X	X	X	X	X	X	X	Not occurred since						18
Total	0	1	0	1	0	1	1	2	2	2	2	2	2	2	3	3	3	2	2	3	3	3	3	3	3	2	0	0	0	0	0	

=== Women's events ===
Current programme
Event	96	00	04	08	12	20	24	28	32	36	48	52	56	60	64	68	72	76	80	84	88	92	96	00	04	08	12	16	20	24	28	Years
Keirin	Not yet introduced																										X	X	X	X	X	5
Madison	Not yet introduced																												X	X	X	3
Omnium	Not yet introduced																										X	X	X	X	X	5
Pursuit, team	Not yet introduced																										X	X	X	X	X	5
Sprint, individual	Not yet introduced																				X	X	X	X	X	X	X	X	X	X	X	11
Sprint, team	Not yet introduced																										X	X	X	X	X	5

Past events

- Points race: 1996, 2000, 2004, 2008
  Now part of omnium events after the 2008 Olympics
- Pursuit, individual: 1992, 1996, 2000, 2004, 2008
- 500 m time trial: 2000, 2004

=== Medal table ===
Last updated after the 2024 Summer Olympics

Rank	Nation	Gold	Silver	Bronze	Total
1	Great Britain	34	28	24	86
2	France	29	21	19	69
3	Italy	25	10	8	43
4	Netherlands	14	17	11	42
5	Australia	13	19	20	52
6	United States	13	15	13	41
7	Germany	12	10	14	36
8	Denmark	6	6	10	22
9	Soviet Union	6	4	6	16
10	East Germany	4	5	4	13
11	West Germany	4	3	3	10
12	New Zealand	3	6	5	14
13	Belgium	3	4	6	13
14	Spain	3	3	3	9
15	Russia	2	4	4	10
16	China	2	3	3	8
17	Canada	2	2	6	10
18	Czechoslovakia	2	2	1	5
19	United Team of Germany	1	3	1	5
20	Switzerland	1	2	1	4
21	Portugal	1	1	0	2
22	Austria	1	0	2	3
23	Argentina	1	0	0	1
23	Estonia	1	0	0	1
23	Norway	1	0	0	1
26	South Africa	0	3	3	6
27	Greece	0	3	0	3
28	Japan	0	2	3	5
29	Poland	0	2	2	4
29	Ukraine	0	2	2	4
31	Malaysia	0	1	1	2
31	Mexico	0	1	1	2
33	Cuba	0	1	0	1
33	Uruguay	0	1	0	1
35	Hong Kong	0	0	2	2
35	ROC (ROC)	0	0	2	2
37	Belarus	0	0	1	1
37	Colombia	0	0	1	1
37	Jamaica	0	0	1	1
Totals (39 entries)		184	184	183	551

== Road cycling ==
=== Men's events ===
Current programme
Event	96	00	04	08	12	20	24	28	32	36	48	52	56	60	64	68	72	76	80	84	88	92	96	00	04	08	12	16	20	24	28	Years
Road race, individual	X	–	–	–	–	–	–	–	–	X	X	X	X	X	X	X	X	X	X	X	X	X	X	X	X	X	X	X	X	X	X	23
Time trial, individual	–	–	–	–	X	X	X	X	X	–	–	–	–	–	–	–	–	–	–	–	–	–	X	X	X	X	X	X	X	X	X	14

Past events
Event	96	00	04	08	12	20	24	28	32	36	48	52	56	60	64	68	72	76	80	84	88	92	96	00	04	08	12	16	20	24	28	Years
Road race, team	–	–	–	–	–	–	–	–	–	X	X	X	X	–	–	–	–	–	–	–	–	–	–	–	–	–	–	–	–	–	–	4
Time trial, team	–	–	–	–	X	X	X	X	X	–	–	–	–	X	X	X	X	X	X	X	X	X	–	–	–	–	–	–	–	–	–	14
Total	1	0	0	0	2	2	2	2	2	2	2	2	2	2	2	2	2	2	2	2	2	2	2	2	2	2	2	2	2	2	2	

=== Women's events ===
Event	96	00	04	08	12	20	24	28	32	36	48	52	56	60	64	68	72	76	80	84	88	92	96	00	04	08	12	16	20	24	28	Years
Road race	–	–	–	–	–	–	–	–	–	–	–	–	–	–	–	–	–	–	–	X	X	X	X	X	X	X	X	X	X	X	X	12
Time trial	–	–	–	–	–	–	–	–	–	–	–	–	–	–	–	–	–	–	–	–	–	–	X	X	X	X	X	X	X	X	X	9
Total	0	0	0	0	0	0	0	0	0	0	0	0	0	0	0	0	0	0	0	1	1	1	2	2	2	2	2	2	2	2	2	

=== Medal table ===
Last updated after the 2024 Summer Olympics

Rank	Nation	Gold	Silver	Bronze	Total
1	Netherlands	10	6	3	19
2	Italy	9	8	4	21
3	France	8	5	7	20
4	Belgium	6	4	8	18
5	United States	6	4	5	15
6	Soviet Union	5	0	3	8
7	Sweden	3	5	8	16
8	Switzerland	3	4	3	10
9	Russia	3	1	4	8
10	Australia	3	1	2	6
11	Great Britain	2	9	6	17
12	Germany	2	6	2	10
13	Denmark	2	5	1	8
14	East Germany	2	1	0	3
14	Spain	2	1	0	3
16	Kazakhstan	1	1	0	2
16	South Africa	1	1	0	2
18	Slovenia	1	0	1	2
19	Austria	1	0	0	1
19	Ecuador	1	0	0	1
19	Greece	1	0	0	1
22	Poland	0	4	2	6
23	West Germany	0	2	2	4
24	Canada	0	1	2	3
25	United Team of Germany	0	1	1	2
26	Colombia	0	1	0	1
26	Portugal	0	1	0	1
28	Norway	0	0	2	2
29	Czechoslovakia	0	0	1	1
29	Latvia	0	0	1	1
29	Lithuania	0	0	1	1
Totals (31 entries)		72	72	69	213

== Mountain biking ==
=== Events ===
Event	96	00	04	08	12	16	20	24	28	Years
Men's cross country	X	X	X	X	X	X	X	X	X	9
Women's cross country	X	X	X	X	X	X	X	X	X	9
Total	2	2	2	2	2	2	2	2	2	

=== Medal table ===
Last updated after the 2024 Summer Olympics

Rank	Nation	Gold	Silver	Bronze	Total
1	France	5	2	1	8
2	Switzerland	2	5	3	10
3	Italy	2	0	1	3
4	Great Britain	2	0	0	2
5	Germany	1	1	1	3
6	Czech Republic	1	1	0	2
7	Netherlands	1	0	1	2
7	Sweden	1	0	1	2
9	Norway	1	0	0	1
10	Canada	0	2	1	3
11	Poland	0	2	0	2
12	Spain	0	1	3	4
13	United States	0	1	2	3
14	Belgium	0	1	0	1
15	Russia	0	0	1	1
15	South Africa	0	0	1	1
Totals (16 entries)		16	16	16	48

== BMX racing ==
=== Events ===
Event	08	12	16	20	24	28	Years
Men's racing	X	X	X	X	X	X	6
Women's racing	X	X	X	X	X	X	6
Total	2	2	2	2	2	2	

=== Medal table ===
Last updated after the 2024 Summer Olympics

Rank	Nation	Gold	Silver	Bronze	Total
1	France	2	2	1	5
2	Colombia	2	1	3	6
3	Latvia	2	0	0	2
4	Netherlands	1	2	2	5
4	United States	1	2	2	5
6	Australia	1	1	0	2
6	Great Britain	1	1	0	2
8	New Zealand	0	1	0	1
9	Switzerland	0	0	1	1
9	Venezuela	0	0	1	1
Totals (10 entries)		10	10	10	30

== BMX freestyle ==
=== Events ===
Event	20	24	28	Years
Men's park	X	X	X	3
Women's park	X	X	X	3
Total	2	2	2	

=== Medal table ===
Last updated after the 2024 Summer Olympics

Rank	Nation	Gold	Silver	Bronze	Total
1	Great Britain	1	1	1	3
2	Australia	1	0	1	2
3	Argentina	1	0	0	1
3	China	1	0	0	1
5	United States	0	2	0	2
6	Venezuela	0	1	0	1
7	France	0	0	1	1
7	Switzerland	0	0	1	1
Totals (8 entries)		4	4	4	12

== Overall medal table ==
Last updated after the 2024 Summer Olympics

Rank	Nation	Gold	Silver	Bronze	Total
1	France	44	30	29	103
2	Great Britain	40	39	31	110
3	Italy	36	18	13	67
4	Netherlands	26	25	17	68
5	United States	20	24	22	66
6	Australia	18	21	23	62
7	Germany	15	17	17	49
8	Soviet Union	11	4	9	24
9	Belgium	9	9	14	32
10	Denmark	8	11	11	30
11	Switzerland	6	11	9	26
12	East Germany	6	6	4	16
13	Russia	5	5	9	19
14	Spain	5	5	6	16
15	Sweden	4	5	9	18
16	West Germany	4	5	5	14
17	New Zealand	3	7	5	15
18	China	3	3	3	9
19	Canada	2	5	9	16
20	Colombia	2	2	4	8
21	Czechoslovakia	2	2	2	6
22	Austria	2	0	2	4
22	Norway	2	0	2	4
24	Latvia	2	0	1	3
25	Argentina	2	0	0	2
26	South Africa	1	4	4	9
27	United Team of Germany	1	4	2	7
28	Greece	1	3	0	4
29	Portugal	1	2	0	3
30	Czech Republic	1	1	0	2
30	Kazakhstan	1	1	0	2
32	Slovenia	1	0	1	2
33	Ecuador	1	0	0	1
33	Estonia	1	0	0	1
35	Poland	0	8	4	12
36	Japan	0	2	3	5
37	Ukraine	0	2	2	4
38	Malaysia	0	1	1	2
38	Mexico	0	1	1	2
38	Venezuela	0	1	1	2
41	Cuba	0	1	0	1
41	Uruguay	0	1	0	1
43	Hong Kong	0	0	2	2
43	ROC	0	0	2	2
45	Belarus	0	0	1	1
45	Jamaica	0	0	1	1
45	Lithuania	0	0	1	1
Totals (47 entries)		286	286	282	854

== Medalists ==
The top of the lists for most successful (by gold medals won) and most decorated (by all medals won) are dominated by recently active track cyclists from Great Britain, who rose to prominence from the Sydney 2000 Summer Olympics, and then dominance from the Beijing 2008 Games, winning 22 gold medals in the velodrome between 2008 and 2020, as well as single golds in road racing, road time trial, BMX freestyle, BMX racing and mountain biking in that timeframe. This sharp rise was largely thanks to significant funding by UK Sport of British Cycling. The most successful Olympic cyclists of each sex are husband-and-wife couple Jason and Laura Kenny, with Jason winning seven golds and two silver medals and Laura five golds and one silver medal. Jason also holds the record of most decorated cyclist, with nine medals, and is the only cyclist to have successfully defended Olympic gold medals in three different cycling events. Laura Kenny shares the title of most decorated female cyclist, with six medals, with Dutch legend Leontien van Moorsel (four golds, one silver and one bronze) and Australia sprint star Anna Meares (two gold, one silver and three bronze medals). Laura Kenny holds the unique distinction of winning the inaugural gold medals in three different events - women's team pursuit and women's omnium (both 2012) and women's madison (2020).

Great Britain's Chris Hoy, the first Olympic cyclist to win six gold medals, holds the unique distinction of having won gold across four different track disciplines; the Kilo, the team sprint (twice), match sprint and keirin (twice) disciplines. Three cyclists share the record for gold medals in the same event with three; Jason Kenny in team sprint, compatriot Ed Clancy in team pursuit, and American Kristin Armstrong in time trial. All three achieved the feat between 2008 and 2016.

Cyclists who have won six or more Olympic medals.

As of the 2024 Summer Olympics

Riders in bold still active.

#	Cyclist	Country	Gold	Silver	Bronze	Total
1	Jason Kenny	Great Britain	7	2	0	9
2	Bradley Wiggins	Great Britain	5	1	2	8
3	Chris Hoy	Great Britain	6	1	0	7
4	Laura Kenny	Great Britain	5	1	0	6
5	**Harrie Lavreysen**	Netherlands	5	0	1	6
6	Leontien van Moorsel	Netherlands	4	1	1	6
7	Burton Downing	United States	2	3	1	6
8	Anna Meares	Australia	2	1	3	6

== Nations ==
Nation	96	00	04	08	12	20	24	28	32	36	48	52	56	60	64	68	72	76	80	84	88	92	96	00	04	08	12	16	20	24	Years
Afghanistan																														2	2
Albania																							1								1
Algeria																					2					1	1	2	2	2	4
Andorra																					2	3									2
Antigua and Barbuda																		2		3	2	3	1								5
Argentina							5	6			12	6		8	10	9	8	4		8	7	8	10	8	4	10	4	6	3	2	19
Individual Neutral Athletes																														3	2
Armenia																							1								1
Aruba																						2	1							1	3
Australia						2	4	2	1	3	6	6	11	9	14	9	10	12	10	12	17	16	21	27	24	28	27	31	29	21	24
Austria	1				6			2		10	8	4	4	8			5	6	6	9	7	5	9	9	10	6	5	4	8	9	21
Azerbaijan																											1	3	1		2
Bahamas																	2														1
Bahrain																						4									1
Barbados																4	3	2		1	2	1			1						7
Belarus																							7		6	5	8	4	4		5
Belgium		1		6	1	15	9	8		8	12	11	7	13	10	15	14	7	12	8	6	7	9	13	9	11	16	14	15	22	26
Belize																2				6	5	5	1								5
Benin																						2									1
Bermuda																				3			1								2
Bohemia		1			5																										2
Bolivia																		1			1	1	1			1		1			6
Brazil										3			1	1			2		6	7	8	7	8	4	6	5	9	10	5	6	14
British West Indies														1																	1
Bulgaria							7			10		5		5	1		4	6	6			1			3	2	2	1			13
Burkina Faso																													1	1	1
Cambodia															6																6
Cameroon																	4	4	6	5											4
Canada				5	2	5	1	6	7	6	6	2	3	2		6	9	11		13	11	15	15	15	12	15	15	19	24	22	23
Cayman Islands																				6	6	6	1								4
Central African Republic																						4									1
Chile					4		3	5		4	4	4	2					2		7		1	5	2	3	5	3	2	3	3	17
China																				7	9	6	5	3	6	12	12	14	7	9	10
Chinese Taipei															4	5	1			2	3	1	1	2	1	1	1	2			12
Colombia													8	7	8	10	10	11		7	7	8	12	9	8	13	17	15	10	15	15
Costa Rica																5		1					1	1	2	2	2	2	3	2	8
Croatia																										3	2	2	1		3
Cuba											1					6	6	6	3			4	1	4	4	3	4	3	1	1	12
Czech Republic																							6	8	13	12	10	12	7	6	7
Czechoslovakia						4	8	4		4		6	6	6	9	8	15	11	11		13	12									14
Cyprus																				1					1		1	1	1	1	5
Denmark					8	6	6	5	6	11	11	13	2	8	12	13	13	11	11	13	9	11	12	9	8	15	10	13	17	16	25
Dominican Republic																												1			1
Democratic Republic of the Congo																5					4	3									3
East Germany																10	11	11	13		17										5
Ecuador																4			4		1	2	3			1	2	2	4	2	9
Egypt							3																	4				1	1	3	3
El Salvador																5							1	1	1	2	1				6
Eritrea																											1	1	3	1	3
Estonia																						3	7	5	6	4	2	2	3	2	8
Ethiopia													4	5	4	5	5		8			5						1	1		8
Fiji																				1											1
Finland					5		4	1		2	5	11	1	4		4	6	1	5	5	4	2	5	2			2	1		2	19
France	2	58		23	12	13	11	8	8	8	11	10	11	14	14	14	15	14	9	17	16	18	20	26	21	28	23	22	28	31	27
Georgia																											1				1
Germany	5	3		9	11			10	4	12		5										17	18	25	22	20	22	29	28	24	16
Great Britain	2	1		36	26	13	12	12	7	11	10	12	12	12	12	14	11	11	12	16	17	16	19	22	22	25	25	26	26	30	27
Greece	9			1							3							1		2		1	3	4	5	4	4	3	3	1	13
Guam																						6		2			1	1			4
Guatemala												5				4				1	5		6	1	2		1	1	1		9
Guyana											1					1	1		2	3	2	1									7
Hong Kong															4			4		4	5		1	2	1	4	5	5	5	2	10
Hungary					5		4		1	8		6		5	7	7	4	1	10		1	4	1	1	2	5	3	1	3	3	20
Indonesia																												1		1	2
Iran															4		4	7			7	7		2	4	3	3	3	1	1	11
Iraq														2		1															2
India											9	5			5																3
Independent Olympic Athletes																						5									1
Indonesia														4								2			1						3
Ireland								2						5		3	4	2	3	5	5	5	5	5	4	4	4	3	7	7	16
Israel														2														2	2	4	2
Italy		7	1	4		12	10	12	10	11	12	11	12	14	14	16	15	14	10	21	18	18	21	18	13	15	13	19	24	21	27
Jamaica												1					6	3	2	5	3	3				1					8
Japan												4	1	5	15	1	3	5		9	12	12	8	10	11	14	9	9	16	18	17
Kazakhstan																							7	7	8	3	2	3	5	3	6
Kenya																								1							1
Kosovo																												1			1
Kyrgyzstan																							1	1	1						3
Laos																												1			1
Latvia							4	5		4												5	7	9	2	5	5	4	4	6	11
Lebanon																1	1		2	1	2	2									6
Lesotho																												1			1
Libya																			7		2		1			1					4
Liechtenstein										1		2		1			1				3	2								1	6
Lithuania							2	4														5	13	8	9	8	4	4	5	3	11
Luxembourg						1	5	4		4	4	4	1	6	2	1	2	2							3	3	2	3	3	2	16
Madagascar																1															1
Malawi																	2			4	4										3
Malaysia															9	2	4	1		1	2	1			1	3	4	2	2	4	11
Malta														3			4		4												3
Mauritius																										1	1	1		3	3
Mexico									3		5	4	4	10	9	12	6	6		8	5	5	9	2	2	2	2	4	7	8	19
Moldova																							5		2	1	1				4
Monaco																					1										1
Mongolia															4				5			4	1							1	4
Morocco														4						4							3	4	1	2	4
Namibia																								1	1	2	2	3	4	2	6
Netherlands				5		10	10	11	2	11	9	6		13	12	10	11	12	7	16	13	17	16	18	24	26	24	26	28	21	24
Nicaragua																		4				1									2
North Korea																						3									1
Norway					6	4		4		2	4	3		1		6	7	8		10	5	9	6	10	8	8	6	7	9		19
New Zealand									1	1	1	2	6	1	5	5	8	4		7	13	14	17	17	16	16	21	19	19	6	19
Nigeria																														1	1
Oman																							1								1
Pakistan											2	2	4	2	4																5
Panama																													1	1	1
Paraguay																													1		2
Peru										4	3				1		5			1		1							1		6
Philippines															4	3	1			4	3	2					1				7
Poland							8	11		4				5	8	10	12	11	11		11	9	8	10	16	11	12	17	17	13	18
Portugal														4									6	4	4	2	4	6	4	7	8
Puerto Rico																1				1			1					1			4
Refugee Olympic Team																													2		2
Republic of China										1	1																				2
Romania												5		6	5	1	1		2						1		1	1	2	1	10
Russia																							18	19	20	22	17	16			6
Republic of China																													18		2
Russian Empire					10																										1
Rwanda																						3					1	2	1	3	3
Samoa																								1							1
San Marino														4		2	1	1	2	1		1									7
Saudi Arabia																				6		3									2
Serbia																										2	2	2		2	3
Serbia and Montenegro																									1						1
Sierra Leone																					1										1
Slovakia																							10	7	9	4	2	2	2	2	6
Slovenia																						1	1	6	4	6	6	7	6	7	7
South Africa				4	1	5	1	1		2	3	5	6	5								5	6	4	4	8	9	7	11	7	17
South Korea											2	3	2	4	6	2				10	15	4	9	3	5	4	10	8	2	2	15
Soviet Union												10	12	13	12	15	15	12	13		18										9
Spain								1						9	6	7	8	4		4	13	14	18	22	22	18	16	12	12	9	15
Sri Lanka														1																	1
Suriname																					1	1							1	1	2
Sweden				2	12	4	4	4	4	5	4	8	4	4	4	6	5	6	6	11	8	9	7	5	9	8	5	4	1	3	25
Switzerland							9	9		11	11	10		14	5	4	10	6	10	12	9	13	13	16	16	14	11	15	20	18	21
Syria																											1				1
Chinese Taipei																													1		2
Thailand															8	7	7	6								1	1	2	1	4	8
Timor-Leste																												1			1
Togo																	3					2									2
Trinidad and Tobago											1		1		3	7	6	2		1	2	2	1				1	1	3	1	12
Tunisia														4												1		1			3
Turkey								4		4	4						6	1								1	3	2	2	1	8
Uganda																				2										1	1
Ukraine																							12	14	16	16	10	7	5	4	6
Unified Team																						19									1
United Team of Germany													10	14	13																3
United Arab Emirates																					6	4	1					1		1	4
United States		1	17	2	9	9	5	4	12	6	9	9	10	14	16	15	15	13		20	19	20	23	26	18	24	24	21	27	23	30
Uruguay											9	7	5	5	8	5	5	5		1	3	2	3	2	2	1	1			1	16
Uzbekistan																							1		1	1	2		2	3	4
Venezuela											1	4	4	5				6	5	2	4	4	6	5	3	4	12	9	2	1	15
Vietnam												4	6		6	2					1									1	5
Virgin Islands																					1	1									2
West Germany																14	17	12		20	15										5
Yugoslavia							4	4		4	4		1	5		4	5	2	4	6	6										12
Zimbabwe																			3		2		1			1					4
No. of nations	5	7	2	11	16	14	24	27	13	30	33	36	30	48	40	52	54	49	34	54	62	76	68	55	61	66	74	80	77	76	
No. of cyclists	19	72	18	97	123	103	139	149	66	175	188	215	161	297	303	329	359	295	230	359	422	451	477	462	464	508	501	523	528	514	
Year	96	00	04	08	12	20	24	28	32	36	48	52	56	60	64	68	72	76	80	84	88	92	96	00	04	08	12	16	20	24	

== See also ==
- Cycling at the Summer Paralympics
- Cycling at the Summer Youth Olympics
- List of Olympic venues in cycling
