= Cycling at the 1896 Summer Olympics – Men's 100 kilometres =

Cycling at the Olympics

Men's 100 kilometres at the Games of the I Olympiad
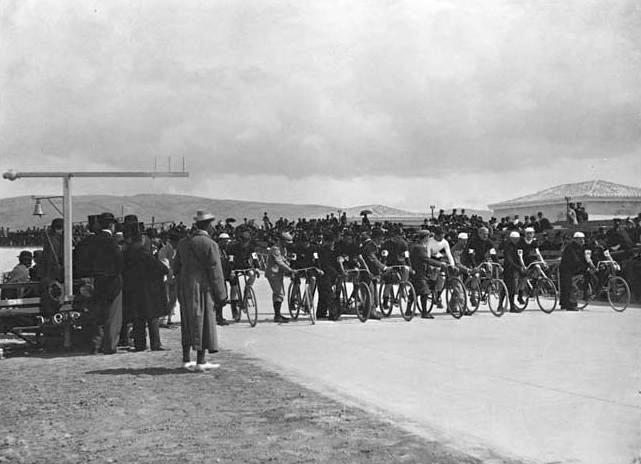
- Start of the race
- Venue: Neo Phaliron Velodrome
- Date: 8 April 1896
- Competitors: 9 from 5 nations
- Winning time: 3:08:19.2

Medalists
1st place, gold medalist(s)		Léon Flameng; France
2nd place, silver medalist(s)		Georgios Kolettis; Greece

The men's 100 kilometres was one of five track cycling events on the Cycling at the 1896 Summer Olympics programme. It was the first race held, on 8 April. It required cyclists to complete 300 circuits of the track. Nine cyclists from five nations competed. The event was won by Léon Flameng of France, with Georgios Kolettis of Greece coming in second.

== Background ==
From 1896 to 1924 (excluding 1912, when no track events were held), the track cycling programme included events at a variety of distances that changed from Games to Games and ranged from the 1/4-mile to the 100 kilometres (and, even longer, the unique 12 hours race in 1896 that saw finishers exceed 300 kilometres). The 100 kilometres was held twice: in 1896 and again in 1908. As with many of the 1896 cycling races, the French team was clearly favored as the strongest cyclists present. However, one of the two Frenchmen (Paul Masson) did not start the race and instead served as pacemaker for the other (Léon Flameng).

== Competition format ==
As the name suggests, the race was 100 kilometres in length. The track was one-third of a kilometre in length, so the cyclists had to complete 300 laps. Pacemakers were allowed in the event, though only Flameng and the Greeks had pacemakers. The nine cyclists started together in a mass start.

== Schedule ==
The exact time of the event is not known. The day was very cold with a bitter wind that was not significantly affected by the low walls around the velodrome.

Date		Time	Round
Gregorian	Julian	Time	Round
Wednesday, 8 April 1896	Wednesday, 27 March 1896		Final

== Results ==
Nine cyclists started the race, but only two finished it. During the race Georgios Kolettis's bike broke down. Léon Flameng stopped and waited for Georgio's bike to be repaired before continuing to race. Flameng had fallen midway through the race but continued on to win the gold medal. Kolettis of Greece had completed 289 laps at that point, and finished fairly soon after Flameng. While competing, Flameng raced with the French flag wrapped about his leg.

Rank	Cyclist	Nation	Time
1st place, gold medalist(s)	Léon Flameng	France	3:08:19.2
2nd place, silver medalist(s)	Georgios Kolettis	Greece	Unknown (11 laps behind)
—	Bernhard Knubel	Germany	DNF (41 km)
—	Theodor Leupold	Germany	DNF (37 km)
—	Edward Battell	Great Britain	DNF (17 km)
—	Aristidis Konstantinidis	Greece	DNF (16 km)
—	Joseph Rosemeyer	Germany	DNF
—	Adolf Schmal	Austria	DNF
—	Joseph Welzenbacher	Germany	DNF
—	Georgios Aspiotis	Greece	DNS
—	Paul Masson	France	DNS
