= Chile at the 1896 Summer Olympics =

- IOC code: CHI
- NOC: Chilean Olympic Committee

in Athens, Greece April 6, 1896 – April 15, 1896
- Competitors: 1 in 2 sports and 4 events
- Medals: Gold 0 Silver 0 Bronze 0 Total 0

Summer Olympics appearances (overview)
- 1896; 1900–1908; 1912; 1920; 1924; 1928; 1932; 1936; 1948; 1952; 1956; 1960; 1964; 1968; 1972; 1976; 1980; 1984; 1988; 1992; 1996; 2000; 2004; 2008; 2012; 2016; 2020; 2024

Chile competed at the 1896 Summer Olympics, the first Olympics, in Athens, Greece, from 6 to 15 April 1896. The delegation consisted of one athlete competing in two sports and four events – runner and cyclist, Luis Subercaseaux. He claimed to have competed for Chile in the 100, 400 and 800 metres running events, along with the men's road race cycling event. Although Subercaseaux’s participation remains a subject of debate among historians, as these claims cannot be substantiated because the Official Report typically includes only medal winners and Subercaseaux did not win any, a photo of the 100 metres sprint appraised by the Chilean forensic police is evidence that he participated. The country's involvement is historically significant as it was the only South American competitor at the Games.

== Background ==
The appearance of Chile at the Athens Summer Olympics marked its first Olympic appearance. The Games took place from 6 to 15 April 1896. Chile did not win an Olympic medal at these Games. The nation's delegation consisted of one athlete competing in two sports and four events. Gymnastics was a major sport in Chile and compulsory for all students in school. However, there were no Chilean gymnasts who competed.

== Competitors ==
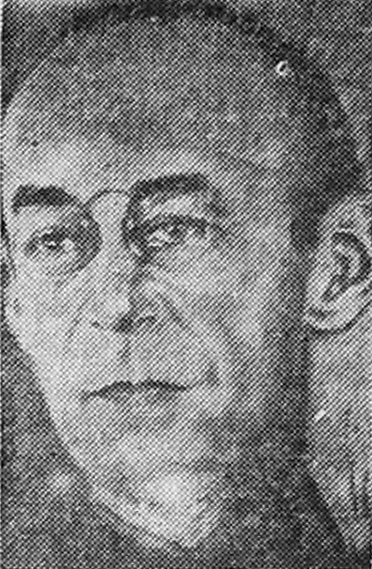
Subercaseaux in 1939

Luis Subercaseaux, full name Luis Subercaseaux Errázuriz, was the only competitor for Chile in the Games. Thirteen years old at the time of the Games, he was the son of Chilean diplomat and politician, Ramón Subercaseaux Vicuña, and brother of Juan Subercaseaux, an archbishop. He was the only South American participant in the Games.

Sport	Men	Women	Total
Athletics	1	0	1
Cycling	1	0	1
Total	1	0	1

== Athletics ==
Track & road events

Subercaseaux competed in three of the athletics events, winning no medals. He was to compete in the men's 100 metres event on 6 April at the Panathenaic Stadium; he did not start. The event was eventually won by Tom Burke of the United States of America. He was also to participate in the men's 400 metres event on the same day and in the same stadium, he also didn't start, with the event also being won by Burke. He then was to contest the men's 800 metres event on the same day and place, and again, did not start. The event was won by Teddy Flack of Australia. The historians who run Olympedia dispute the claim that he participated and maintain that, although he was entered in these events, he did not take part in any race. The International Olympic Committee website lists him as a non-starter in the 100 metres and the 800 metres, and does not list him in the 400 metres. An appraisal of a photo of the 100 meters sprint, performed by facial recognition experts of the Chilean forensic police, concluded that Subercaseaux was one of the participants.

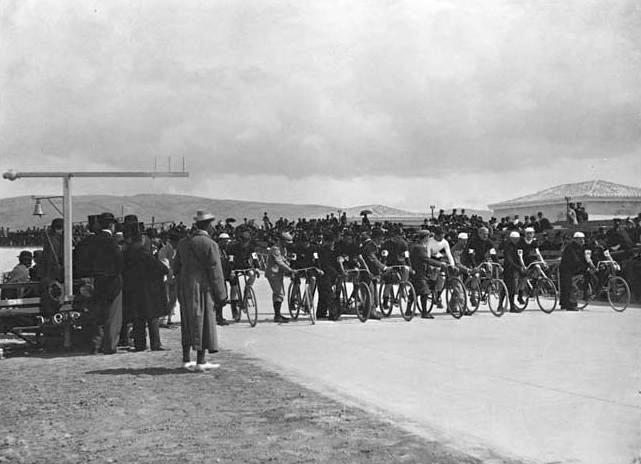
Neo Phaliron Velodrome at the Games

Athlete	Event	Heat		Final	
Athlete	Event	Time	Rank	Time	Rank
Luis Subercaseaux	100 m	DNS		Did not advance	
Luis Subercaseaux	400 m	DNS		Did not advance	
Luis Subercaseaux	800 m	DNS		Did not advance	

== Cycling ==
Subercaseaux competed in one of the cycling events, winning no medals. He was to compete in the men's road race event on 12 April at the Neo Phaliron Velodrome; however, he did not start. The event was eventually won by Aristidis Konstantinidis of Greece.

=== Road ===
Athlete	Event	Time	Rank
Luis Subercaseaux	Men's road race	DNS	
