= Cycling at the 1896 Summer Olympics – Men's 10 kilometres =

Cycling at the Olympics

Men's 10 kilometres at the Games of the I Olympiad
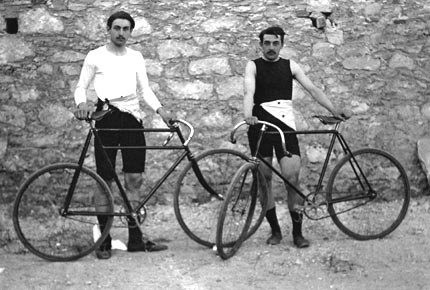
- The French medalists Flameng and Masson
- Venue: Neo Phaliron Velodrome
- Date: 11 April 1896
- Competitors: 6 from 4 nations
- Winning time: 17:54.2

Medalists
1st place, gold medalist(s)		Paul Masson; France
2nd place, silver medalist(s)		Léon Flameng; France
3rd place, bronze medalist(s)		Adolf Schmal; Austria

The men's 10 kilometres was one of the five track cycling races on the Cycling at the 1896 Summer Olympics programme. It was held on 11 April and comprised 30 laps of the track. The 1896 Games was the only time that the 10 kilometres track race was part of the cycling program at an Olympic Games. Six cyclists from four nations competed. The event was won by Paul Masson of France, the second of his three victories that day (he had previously won the sprint and would shortly afterwards win the track time trial). His countryman Léon Flameng finished second, while Austrian Adolf Schmal was third.

== Background ==
From 1896 to 1924 (excluding 1912, when no track events were held), the track cycling programme included events at a variety of distances that changed from Games to Games and ranged from the 1/4-mile to the 100 kilometres (and, even longer, the unique 12 hours race in 1896 that saw finishers exceed 300 kilometres). The 10 kilometres was held only in 1896. As with many of the 1896 cycling races, the French team was clearly favored as the strongest cyclists present.

== Competition format ==
As the name suggests, the race was 10 kilometres in length. The track was one-third of a kilometre in length, so the cyclists had to complete 30 laps. No pacemakers were allowed. The six cyclists started together.

== Schedule ==
The exact time of the event is not known; the cycling events began shortly after 2 p.m. and the 10 kilometres was the second event, after the sprint. The day was very cold.

Date		Time	Round
Gregorian	Julian	Time	Round
Saturday, 11 April 1896	Saturday, 30 March 1896		Final

== Results ==
Six competitors entered the third cycling race. The two Frenchmen that had raced in the 2 kilometre sprint race finished in the top two positions in the 10 kilometres, with the finish coming down to a sprint won by Masson. Adolf Schmal of Austria finished third. Rosemeyer of Germany finished this race in fourth place. The two Greek cyclists collided two-thirds of the way through the race. Kolettis returned to the race for a while before quitting at the 7 km mark due to his injuries from the crash; it is not clear if Konstantinidis finished.

Rank	Cyclist	Nation	Time
1st place, gold medalist(s)	Paul Masson	France	17:54.2
2nd place, silver medalist(s)	Léon Flameng	France	17:54.8
3rd place, bronze medalist(s)	Adolf Schmal	Austria	Unknown
4	Joseph Rosemeyer	Germany	Unknown
—	Aristidis Konstantinidis	Greece	Unknown
—	Georgios Kolettis	Greece	DNF
