= List of Summer Olympics venues: M–N =

For the Summer Olympics, there were a total of 45 venues starting with the letter 'M' and 19 venues starting with the letter 'N'.

== M ==
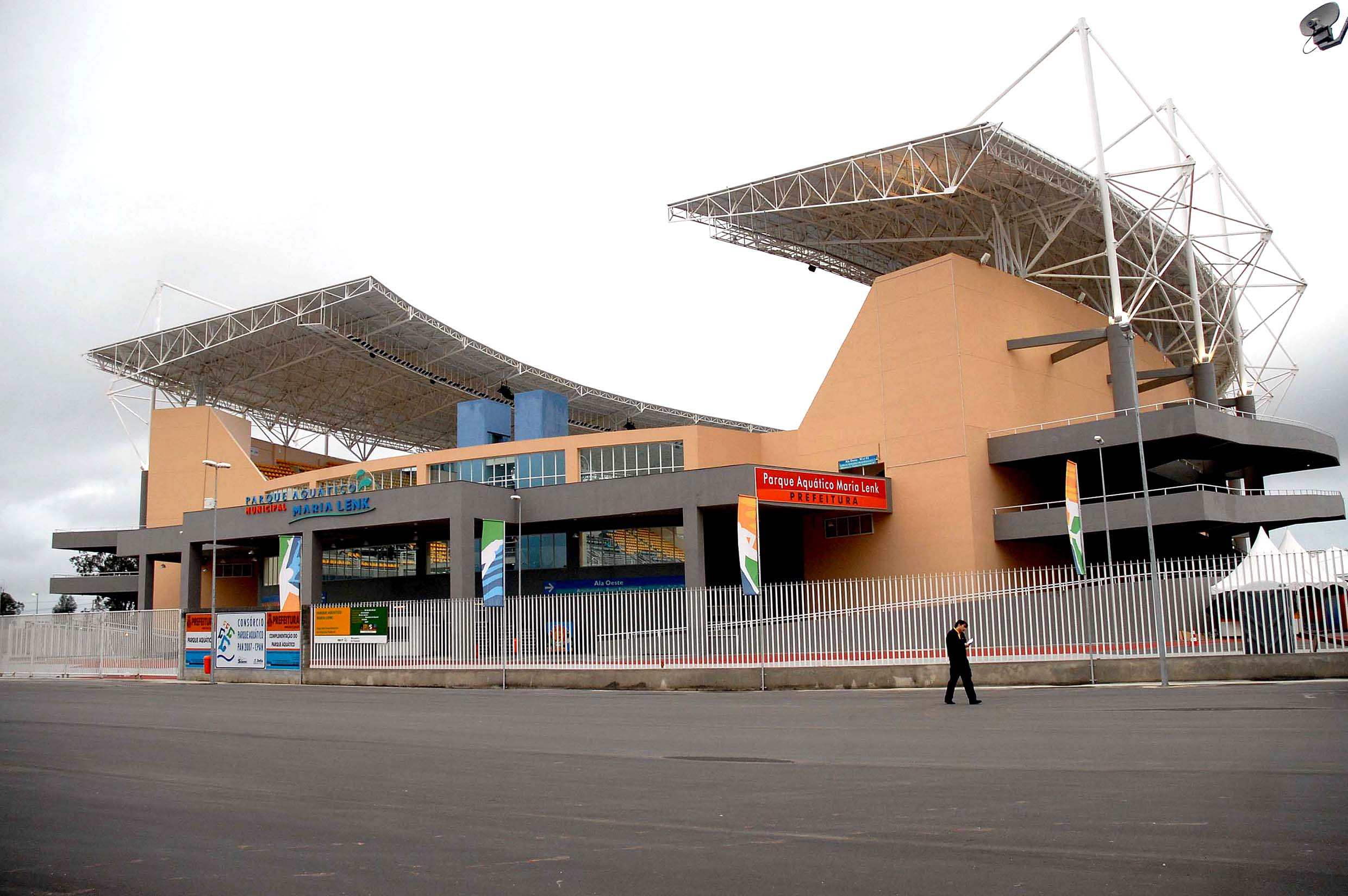
Maria Lenk Water Park at 2007 Pan American Games. This venue will serve as host for the diving and water polo events for the 2016 Summer Olympics in Rio de Janeiro.

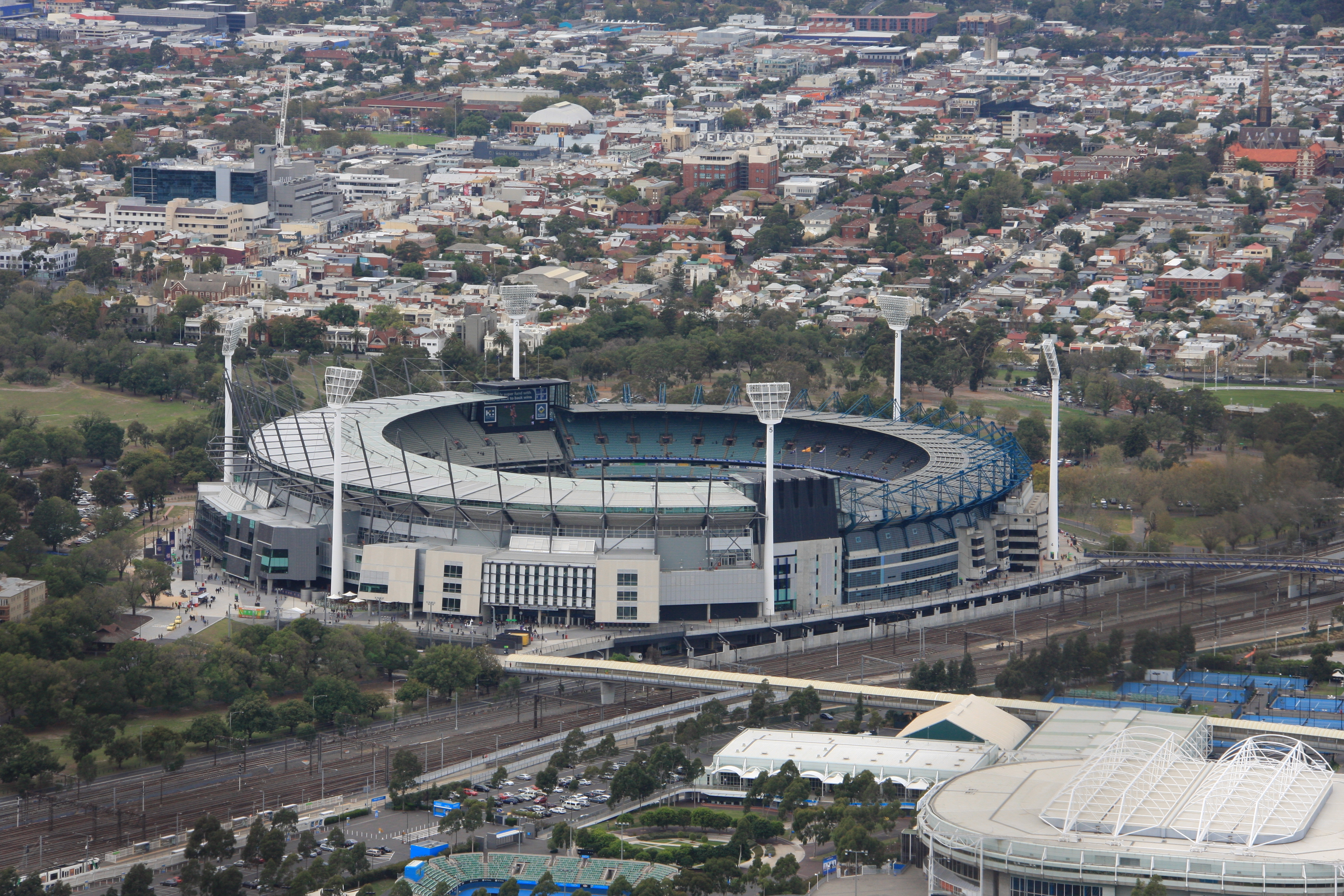
The Melbourne Cricket Ground in 2009. For the 1956 Summer Olympics, the ground hosted the athletics, field hockey final, and football final. It hosted several football preliminary matches for the 2000 Summer Olympics held in neighboring Sydney.

Venue	Games	Sports	Capacity	Ref.
Mälaren	1912 Stockholm	Cycling	Not listed.	
Malmi shooting range	1952 Helsinki	Shooting (pistol/ rifle)	Not listed.	
Maracanã Stadium	2016 Rio de Janeiro	Football (final), Ceremonies (opening/closing)	78,838	
Maracanãzinho Arena	2016 Rio de Janeiro	Volleyball (indoor)	12,000	
Marathon (city)	1896 Athens	Athletics (Marathon (sport)), Cycling (Individual road race).	Not listed.	
Marathon (city)	2004 Athens	Athletics (marathon start)	Not listed.	
Marathon course	1992 Barcelona	Athletics (marathon)	Not listed.	
Marathon course	1996 Atlanta	Athletics (marathon)	800	
Marathon course	2000 Sydney	Athletics (marathon)	Not listed.	
Marathon Course	2012 London	Athletics (marathon)	Not listed.	
Maria Lenk Aquatic Center	2016 Rio de Janeiro	Diving, Water polo	6,500	
Marina da Glória	2016 Rio de Janeiro	Sailing	10,000	
Markopoulo Olympic Equestrian Centre	2004 Athens	Equestrian	Not listed.	
Markopoulo Olympic Shooting Centre	2004 Athens	Shooting	Not listed.	
Mataró	1992 Barcelona	Athletics (marathon start)	Not listed.	
Maunula	1952 Helsinki	Cycling (road)	21,708	
Maurice Richard Arena	1976 Montreal	Boxing, Wrestling	4,750	
Mayfield	1936 Berlin	Equestrian (dressage), Polo	75,000	
Meilahti	1952 Helsinki	Rowing	12,763	
Melbourne Cricket Ground	1956 Melbourne	Athletics, Field hockey (final), Football (final)	104,000	
Melbourne Cricket Ground	2000 Sydney	Football	98,000	
Melbourne Rectangular Stadium	2032 Brisbane	Football	30,000	
Messegelände, Fechthalle 1	1972 Munich	Fencing (final)	978	
Messegelände Fechthalle 2	1972 Munich	Fencing, Modern pentathlon (fencing)	Same as Fechthalle 1.	
Messegelände, Gewichtheberhalle	1972 Munich	Weightlifting	3,297	
Messegelände, Judo- und Ringerhalle	1972 Munich	Judo, Wrestling	5,750	
Messuhalli	1952 Helsinki	Basketball (final), Boxing, Gymnastics, Weightlifting, Wrestling	5,500	
Meulan-en-Yvelines	1900 Paris	Sailing	Not listed.	
Meulan-en-Yvelines	1924 Paris	Sailing	389	
Millennium Stadium	2012 London	Football	74,600	
Mineirão Stadium	2016 Rio de Janeiro	Football	74,300	
Minor Arena	1980 Moscow	Volleyball (final)	8,700	
Mitsuzawa Football Field	1964 Tokyo	Football	10,100	
Mollet del Vallès Shooting Range	1992 Barcelona	Modern pentathlon (shooting), Shooting	1,400	
Molson Stadium, McGill University	1976 Montreal	Field hockey	19,500	
Mommsenstadion	1936 Berlin	Football	15,005	
Mongchon Tosong	1988 Seoul	Modern pentathlon (running)	10,000	
Monnikenhuize	1928 Amsterdam	Football	Not listed.	
Montreal Botanical Garden	1976 Montreal	Athletics (20 km walk), Modern pentathlon (running)	Not listed.	
Montreal Forum	1976 Montreal	Basketball (final), Boxing (final), Gymnastics, Handball (final), Volleyball (final)	18,000	
Morehouse College Gymnasium	1996 Atlanta	Basketball	6,500	
Moreton Bay Indoor Sports Centre	2032 Brisbane	Boxing	7,000	
Morris Brown College Stadium	1996 Atlanta	Field hockey (final)	15,000	
Moscow-Minsk Highway	1980 Moscow	Cycling (road team time trial)	1,800	
Mount Royal Park	1976 Montreal	Cycling (individual road race)	4,400	
Municipal Stadium	1968 Mexico City	Field hockey	7,360	

== N ==
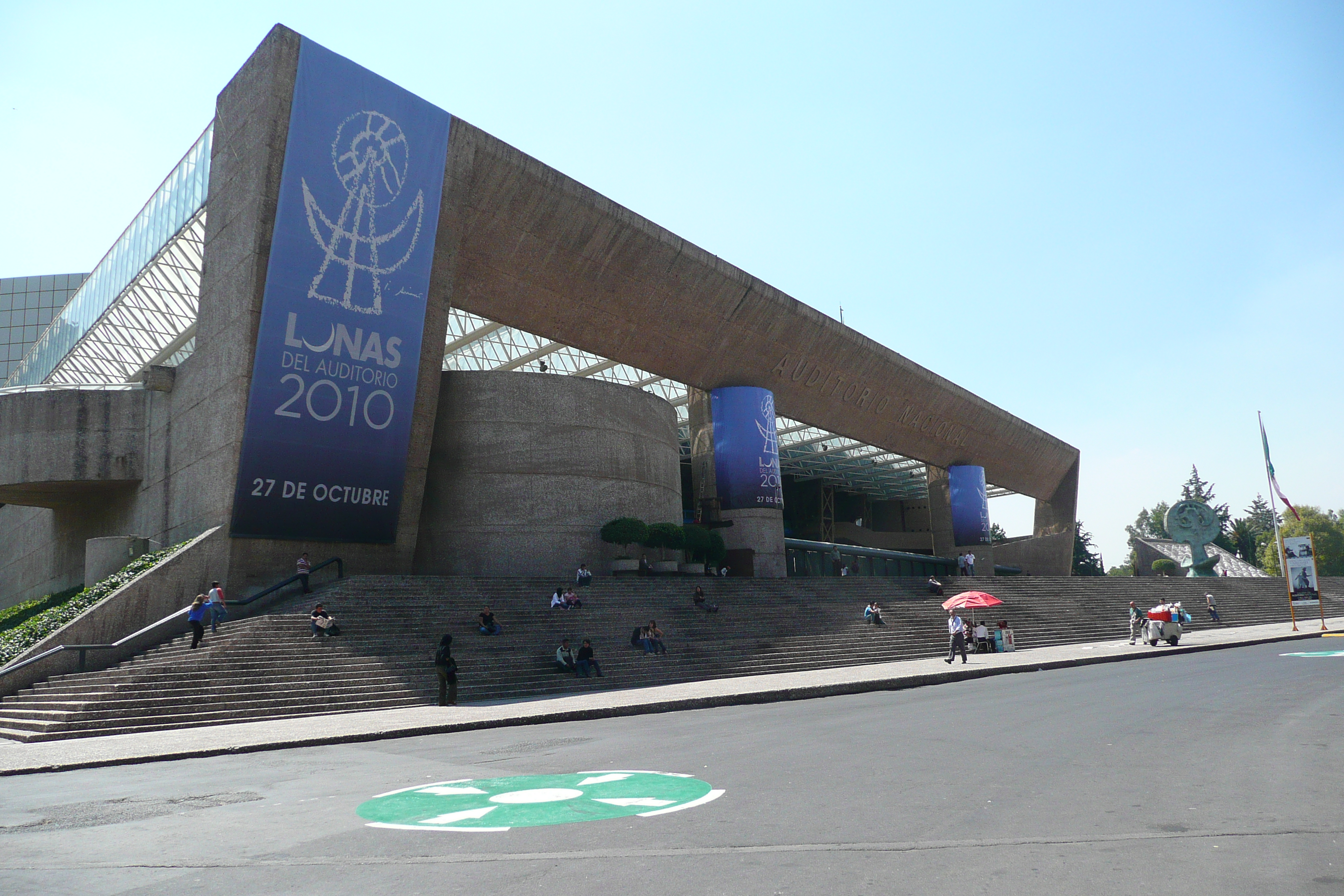
National Auditorium hosted the gymnastics events for the 1968 Summer Olympics in Mexico City.

Venue	Games	Sports	Capacity	Ref.
Nachtegalen Park	1920 Antwerp	Archery	Not listed.	
Nagai Stadium	1964 Tokyo	Football	20,000	
Naples Saint Paul's Stadium	1960 Rome	Football	60,240	
National Auditorium	1968 Mexico City	Gymnastics	12,450	
National Equestrian Center	2016 Rio de Janeiro	Equestrian	14,000	
National Gymnasium	1964 Tokyo	Basketball (final), Diving, Modern pentathlon (swimming), Swimming	4,000 (basketball); 11,300 (diving, swimming)	
National Shooting Center	2016 Rio de Janeiro	Shooting	6,850	
National Stadium	1964 Tokyo	Athletics, Equestrian (team jumping), Football (final)	71,600	
Navy–Marine Corps Memorial Stadium	1984 Los Angeles	Football	34,000	
Neo Phaliron Velodrome	1896 Athens	Cycling (track)	Not listed.	
Neuilly-sur-Seine	1900 Paris	Basque pelota	Not listed.	
Nikaia Olympic Weightlifting Hall	2004 Athens	Weightlifting	Not listed.	
Nippon Budokan	1964 Tokyo	Judo	14,100	
Nippon Budokan	2020 Tokyo	Judo, Karate	14,471	
Nishikyogoku Athletic Stadium	1964 Tokyo	Football	10,000	
The O2 Arena (renamed North Greenwich Arena during the games)	2012 London	Basketball (final), Gymnastics (artistic, trampolining)	20,000	
North Sydney	2000 Sydney	Athletics (marathon start)	Not listed.	
Northampton Institute	1908 London	Boxing	Not listed.	
NSW Tennis Centre	2000 Sydney	Tennis	10,000	
Nynäshamn	1912 Stockholm	Sailing	Not listed.	
