= Karaiskakis Stadium =

Football stadium in Piraeus, Attica, Greece

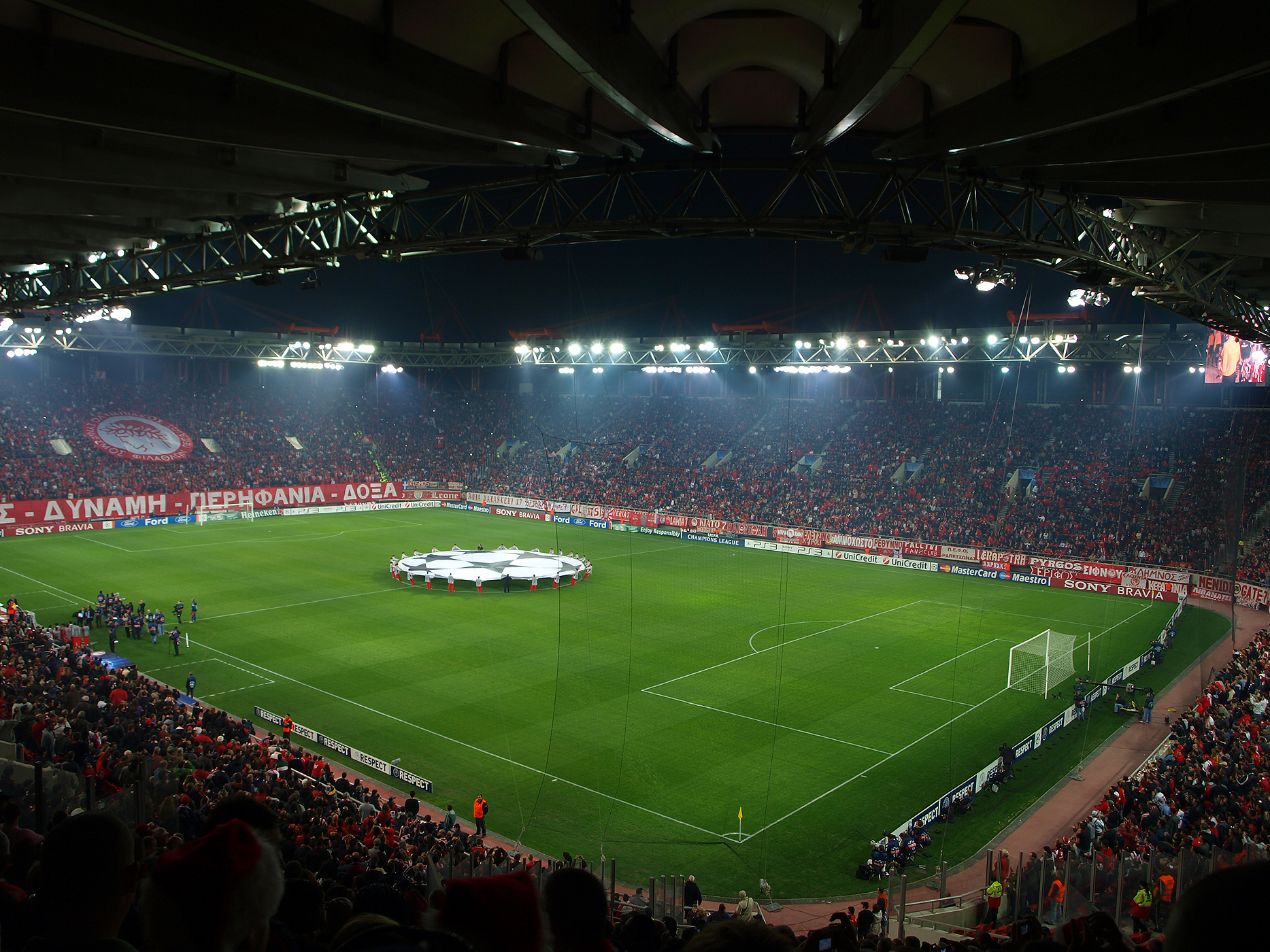
- The Karaiskakis Stadium during a 2009–10 UEFA Champions League match UEFA
- Interactive map of Karaiskakis Stadium
- Full name: Georgios Karaiskakis Stadium
- Former names: Neo Phaliron Velodrome (1895–1964)
- Location: Piraeus, Attica, Greece
- Coordinates: 37°56′46″N 23°39′52″E
- Owner: Hellenic Olympic Committee
- Operator: Olympiacos
- Capacity: 33,334; ~35,000 (old stadium)
- Executive suites: 40
- Type: Stadium
- Surface: Hybrid grass
- Scoreboard: LED
- Record attendance: 45,445 (Olympiacos vs AEK, 7 April 1965)
- Field size: 120 x 80 m
- Public transit: Faliro; SEF

Construction
- Built: 1895
- Opened: 1896
- Renovated: 1964, 2004
- Cost: € 60,000,000
- Architects: 1. DECATHLON S.A; 2. Stelios Agiostratitis

Tenants
- Olympiacos (1925–1984, 1989–1997, 2004–present); Ethnikos Piraeus (1924–2000); Greece national football team (1971–1976, 2004–2009, 2010–2017, 2024–present); Greece women's national football team (2008–2017)

The Georgios Karaiskakis Stadium (Greek: Στάδιο Γεώργιος Καραϊσκάκης), commonly referred to as the Karaiskakis Stadium (Greek: Στάδιο Καραϊσκάκη, [ˈstaðio karaiˈskaki]), is a football stadium in Piraeus, Attica, Greece, and the home ground of the Piraeus football club Olympiacos. It is named after Georgios Karaiskakis, a military commander and national hero of the Greek War of Independence, who was mortally wounded in the area.

With a capacity of 33,334 it is the largest football-specific stadium and the second largest football stadium in Greece overall.

The stadium hosted the 2023 UEFA Super Cup, since the original venue in Kazan had to be moved due to Russia's suspension from UEFA.

== History ==
View from outside

It was used during the Athens 1896 Summer Olympics, as the Neo Phaliron Velodrome, where Frenchman Paul Masson took the three track cycling gold medals.

It was renovated during the 1960s and hosted the European Winners' Cup final of 1970–1971, the first European football final that held in Greece, between Chelsea and Real Madrid. The first match ended with a score of 1–1, and in the replay Chelsea won 2–1 to claim the trophy. The stadium was completely rebuilt in 2004 into a 32,115 capacity, all seater stadium, ready for the football competition of the 2004 Summer Olympics.

The stadium was totally demolished and built again from the beginning, facing a different direction. This complete reconstruction took a record time of only 14 months, finishing just in time for the Olympic Games. After the last deal ended in 1998, Olympiacos is using the stadium once again, on a 49-year lease from 2003 until 2052 and is traditionally identified as the club's true home. In 2002, the president and owner of Olympiacos Socratis Kokkalis, when announced the project to rebuild Karaiskakis, expressed his wish for the new stadium to be also used by Ethnikos, if they wanted, as Karaiskakis is the historic home of Ethnikos OFPF, Atromitos Piraeus and Olympiacos SFP. Therefore, in the contract signed by the Hellenic Olympic Committee, the owner of the stadium, and Olympiacos, a clause was included, stating that should Ethnikos wish to return to the stadium, they may do so without sharing any significant maintenance or other stadium-related costs, as those are covered by Olympiacos. As of 2026, Ethnikos has not yet opted to do so.

The ticket sales average higher than any team's in recent decades for the Super League Greece history (rarely have they dropped under the 5,000 mark) and are not expected to drop in the foreseeable future.

Sales for national team matches had also been higher, but this was for the most part due to Greece's success in the Euro 2004. As of 2008 and after Greece's disappointing Euro 2008 performance, the attendance of national team matches dropped drastically, leading the Ministry of Sport to change the venue to Heraklion, Crete.

In June 2005, Karaiskakis stadium hosted a movie theatre (Ciné Karaiskakis) with a cinema screen that is 20 m long and 10 m wide, operating daily between 9 and 11 p.m. (6 and 8 p.m. UTC) and later, every weekend. The movie screen featured movies including Batman Begins and others. The stadium operated as a movie theatre for the last time on Saturday 13 August 2005.

In 2026, it was revealed that the stadium would be massively renovated. The goal is for the new stadium to include over 50,000 seats.

== The Gate 7 Tragedy ==
Twenty-one supporters of Olympiacos died in "Gate 7" (Θύρα 7) of the stadium, after a game between Olympiacos and AEK Athens (that ended 6–0), on 8 February 1981; an incident widely known as the Karaiskaki Stadium disaster. In memory of this event, at the tribune where Gate 7 is now, twenty-one seats are black colored instead of red, shaping the number "7". A monument on the eastern side of the stadium bears the names of the twenty-one supporters killed on that day in the stadium.

== Stadium features ==
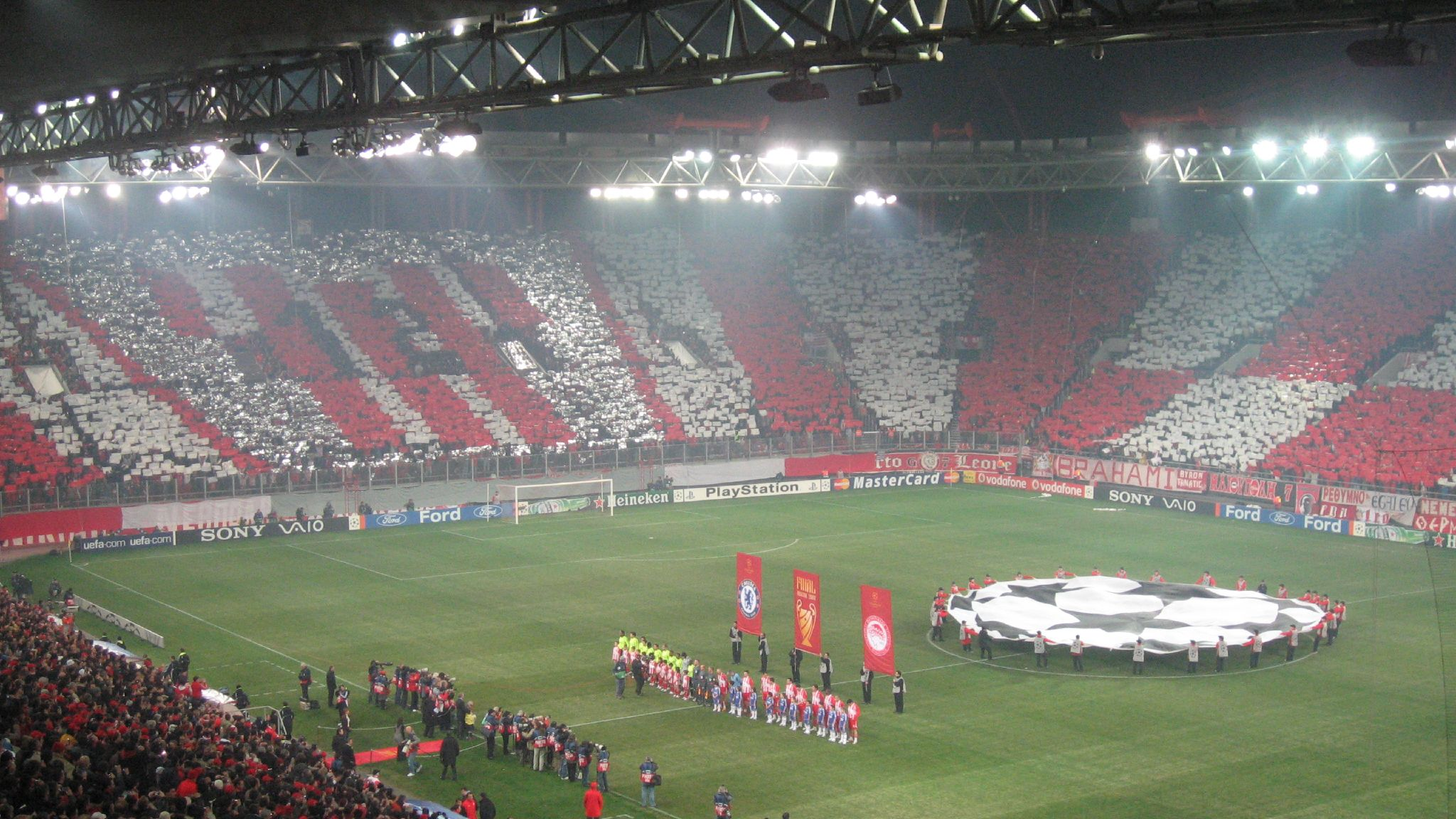
Olympiacos vs Chelsea during the 2007–08 UEFA Champions League

Karaiskakis Stadium is classified as a 4-star football stadium by the UEFA organisation, allowing it to host the UEFA Europa League final if chosen. It hosts 40 VIP lounges and suites, that can hold up to 474 persons, a press conference hall, that can hold up to 130 seats, 200 seats for press and media coverage, an entire shopping mall, with restaurants, cafés, retail and clothing stores and a gym.

The stadium also hosts Olympiacos Museum, dedicated not only to the history of the football club, but to the history of all the departments of the multiple European title-winning multi-sport club Olympiacos CFP. There are 10 automated ticket selling machines around the stadium enabling reservations through the internet or by phone. There is no extra charge for the parking area, which takes up to 1,000 cars. Due to its design, the stadium's tribunes have the ability to empty within 7 minutes. The stadium also has restaurants and stores opened during concerts and games and sometimes open with the daily general timetable of most Greek stores and shops.

The stadium is easily accessed through by public transport, at Faliro, which is less than five minutes from Piraeus, and about 15 minutes from Athens city centre, at Omonia, and also through Athens driving routes, which is 8 km, about 15 minutes from downtown Athens.

== Concerts ==
Rihanna, Aerosmith, Evanescence, 50 Cent, Scorpions, Whitesnake, Imiskoumbria, Def Leppard and Sex Pistols have performed at the stadium.

== Major games ==
=== 1971 European Cup Winners' Cup final ===
19 May 1971	Real Madrid (Spain)	1–1	(England) Chelsea
	Zoco 90'	Report	Osgood 56'	Attendance: 42,000; Referee: Rudolf Scheurer (Switzerland)

21 May 1971 Replay	Real Madrid (Spain)	1–2	(England) Chelsea
	Fleitas 75'	Report	Dempsey 31'; Osgood 39'	Attendance: 19,917; Referee: Anton Bucheli (Switzerland)

=== 2004 Summer Olympics ===
Karaiskakis Stadium hosted six games of the men's football tournament at the 2004 Summer Olympics, and four games of the women's Olympic Football tournament.

=== Men's tournament ===
Date	Time	Team No. 1	Res.	Team No. 2	Round	Attendance
14 August 2004	20:30	South Korea	1–0	Mexico	Group A	14,026
15 August 2004	20:30	Costa Rica	0–2	Iraq	Group D	12,150
17 August 2004	20:30	Argentina	1–0	Australia	Group C	26,338
18 August 2004	20:30	Paraguay	1–0	Italy	Group B	24,160
21 August 2004	18:00	Mali	0–1 (a.e.t.)	Italy	Quarter-finals	27,543
24 August 2004	18:00	Italy	0–3	Argentina	Semi-finals	30,910

=== Women's tournament ===
Date	Time	Team No. 1	Res.	Team No. 2	Round	Attendance
14 August 2004	18:00	Japan	0–1	Nigeria	Group A	14,126
17 August 2004	18:00	Germany	2–0	Mexico	Group B	26,338
26 August 2004	18:00	Germany	1–0	Sweden	Bronze medal match	10,416
26 August 2004	21:00	United States	2–1 (a.e.t.)	Brazil	Gold medal match	10,416

=== 2023 UEFA Super Cup ===
16 August 2023	Manchester City (England)	1–1 (5–4 p)	(Spain) Sevilla
22:00 UTC+3	Palmer 63'	Report	En-Nesyri 25'	Attendance: 29,207; Referee: François Letexier (France)
	Penalties
	Haaland (penalty scored); Álvarez (penalty scored); Kovačić (penalty scored); Grealish (penalty scored); Walker (penalty scored)		(penalty scored) Ocampos; (penalty scored) Mir; (penalty scored) Rakitić; (penalty scored) Montiel; (penalty missed) Gudelj

Preceded by Sydney Football Stadium; Sydney	Summer Olympics; Women's football gold medal match venue 2004	Succeeded by Workers' Stadium; Beijing
Preceded by Helsinki Olympic Stadium; Helsinki	UEFA Super Cup; Match venue 2023	Succeeded by Kazimierz Górski National Stadium; Warsaw
