= Edward Battell =

British racing cyclist

Cycling career
- Sport: Cycling
Medal record
Men's road bicycle racing
Representing Great Britain
Olympic Games
Bronze medal – third place	1896 Athens	Road race

Edward Battell was a British racing cyclist. He competed at the 1896 Summer Olympics in Athens.

Battell competed in the 333 metres, 100 kilometres, and road races. He came third in the road race, 87 km from Athens to Marathon and back. He came fourth in the 333m in 26.2 seconds. He was among the seven of the nine that started not to finish the 100 km.

== Amateurism protests ==
Battell worked as a servant at the British Embassy in Greece. There were objections that he and another rider, Frederick Keeping, worked for a living. That made them "not gentlemen so they could not possibly be amateurs." The historian Mike Price said: "Gentlemen were not paid so were true amateurs. Servants had to be paid and so lost any claims to being amateur. Such was the attitude of the day. Protests were overruled."

== Olympic Races ==
On 8 April, Battell competed in his first of his three races at this Olympics, he lined up with eight other cyclist in the 100 km race, which was 300 laps are the 333 metre track, Battell was one of the seven cyclist to retire from the race which was eventually won by the Frenchman, Léon Flameng. After a two-day break he was back in the saddle this time competing in the time trial, this was one lap around the 333 metre track, Battell did his lap in 26.2 seconds which was just 0.2 seconds behind the 3rd place rider, another Frenchman, Paul Masson won the race in a time of 24 seconds. The next day was the individual road race which was from Athens to Marathon and back again, totalling 87 km, Battell at one point was leading the race but was so exhausted he was eventually overtaken by the Greek, Aristidis Konstantinidis and German, August von Gödrich and finished in third place.
