= Cycling at the 1896 Summer Olympics – Men's 12 hour race =

Cycling at the Olympics

Men's 12 hour race at the Games of the I Olympiad
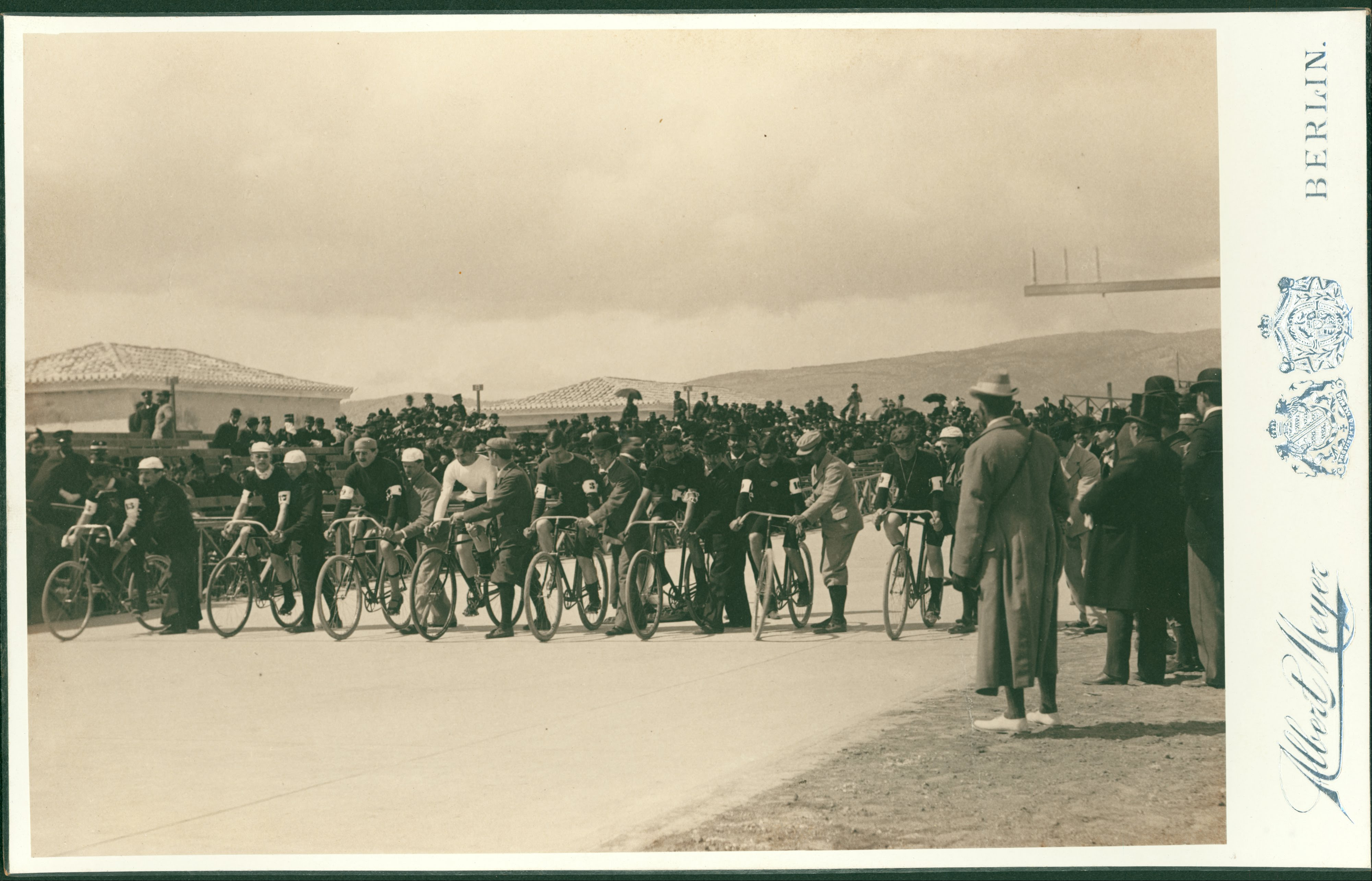
- The start of the race
- Venue: Neo Phaliron Velodrome
- Date: 13 April 1896
- Competitors: 7 from 4 nations
- Winning distance: 314.997 km

Medalists
1st place, gold medalist(s)		Adolf Schmal; Austria
2nd place, silver medalist(s)		Frederick Keeping; Great Britain

The men's 12 hour race was one of five track cycling events on the Cycling at the 1896 Summer Olympics programme. It was the final event of the 1896 Summer Olympics, ending at 5 p.m. on 13 April. Seven cyclists from four nations started. The event was won by Adolf Schmal of Austria, the only gold medal in cycling ever won by the nation, until Anna Kiesenhofer's win in the 2020 Women's Road Race. Schmal lapped silver medalist Frederick Keeping of Great Britain early, winning by that lap as the two were the only riders to finish. The 12 hour race was the last event to finish at the 1896 Games.

== Background ==
From 1896 to 1924 (excluding 1912, when no track events were held), the track cycling programme included events at a variety of distances that changed from Games to Games and ranged from the 1/4-mile to the 100 kilometres (and, even longer, the unique 12 hours race in 1896 that saw finishers nearly reach 300 kilometres). The 12 hours race was held only in 1896 and was the only time that an Olympic race was based on a set time rather than a fixed distance.

== Competition format ==
As the name suggests, the race was a 12-hour race with the cyclists trying to cover the greatest distance of the field. Pacemakers were allowed. All cyclists started together in a mass start.

== Schedule ==
The day was cold, windy, and rainy, with snow on the mountains. The weather was bad enough to cancel the rowing events scheduled for the same day as the race.

Date		Time	Round
Gregorian	Julian	Time	Round
Monday, 13 April 1896	Monday, 1 April 1896	5:00	Final

== Results ==
The final cycling race began at 5 a.m. on 13 April. Seven athletes began the race, though four of them dropped out before noon and a fifth gave up in the afternoon. Schmal had lapped the rest of the cyclists early in the race and rode along with Keeping for the rest of the contest, winning by that one lap. The 12 hour race was never included again in the cycling program at the Olympic Games.

Rank	Cyclist	Nation	Distance
1st place, gold medalist(s)	Adolf Schmal	Austria	295.300 km
2nd place, silver medalist(s)	Frederick Keeping	Great Britain	294.946 km
—	Georgios Paraskevopoulos	Greece	DNF
—	Nikos Loverdos	Greece	DNF (3 hours)
—	A. Tryfiatis-Tripiaris	Greece	DNF (3 hours)
—	Joseph Welzenbacher	Germany	DNF (3 hours)
—	Konstantinos Konstantinou	Greece	DNF (3 hours)
