= Kolettis =

Kolettis (Greek: Κολέτης) is a Greek surname. Notable people with the surname include:

- Ioannis Kolettis (1773–1847), Greek politician who served as Prime Minister of Greece
- Georgios Kolettis, Greek cyclist
