= Austria at the 1896 Summer Olympics =

- IOC code: AUT
- NOC: Committee for the Olympic Games in Athens for Austria

in Athens, Greece 6 April 1896 – 15 April 1896
- Competitors: 3 in 3 sports and 9 events
- Medals Ranked 7th: Gold 2 Silver 1 Bronze 2 Total 5

Summer Olympics appearances (overview)
- 1896; 1900; ~~1904~~; 1908; 1912; 1920; 1924; 1928; 1932; 1936; 1948; 1952; 1956; 1960; 1964; 1968; 1972; 1976; 1980; 1984; 1988; 1992; 1996; 2000; 2004; 2008; 2012; 2016; 2020; 2024; 2028

Other related appearances
- 1906 Intercalated Games

Three sportsmen from Austria competed at the 1896 Summer Olympics. Though Austria was then a part of Austria-Hungary, most sources separate Austrian competitors from the Hungarians at the 1896 Games.

== Medalists ==
The following competitors won medals at the games. In the discipline sections below, the medalists' names are bolded.

Medal	Name	Sport	Event	Date
Gold	Adolf Schmal	Cycling	Men's 12 hour race	April 13
Gold	Paul Neumann	Swimming	500 m freestyle	April 11
Silver	Otto Herschmann	Swimming	100 m Freestyle	April 11
Bronze	Adolf Schmal	Cycling	10 km	April 11
Bronze	Adolf Schmal	Cycling	Time trial	April 11

Medals by sport
Sport	1st place, gold medalist(s)	2nd place, silver medalist(s)	3rd place, bronze medalist(s)	Total
Swimming	1	1	0	**2**
Cycling	1	0	2	**3**
Total	2	1	2	5

Medals by day
Day	Date	1st place, gold medalist(s)	2nd place, silver medalist(s)	3rd place, bronze medalist(s)	Total
1	6 April	0	0	0	**0**
2	7 April	0	0	0	**0**
3	8 April	0	0	0	**0**
4	9 April	0	0	0	**0**
5	10 April	0	0	0	**0**
6	11 April	1	1	2	**4**
7	12 April	0	0	0	**0**
8	13 April	1	0	0	**1**
Total		2	1	2	5

=== Multiple medalists ===
The following competitors won multiple medals at the 1896 Olympic Games.

Name	Medal	Sport	Event
Adolf Schmal	Gold; Bronze; Bronze	Cycling	Men's 12 hour race Men's track time trial Men's 10 kilometres

== Competitors ==
The following is the list of number of competitors in the Games.

Sport	Men	Women	Total
Cycling	1	0	1
Fencing	1	0	1
Swimming	2	0	2
Total	3	0	3

== Cycling ==
All three of Schmal's medals were won in the cycling competitions, even though he competed in two different sports. He competed in four events, earning a top three finish in three of them. In the time trial event, Schmal tied for second place Stamatios Nikolopoulos. A race-off between the two broke the tie in favor of the Greek athlete.

=== Track ===
Athlete	Event	Time / Distance	Rank
Adolf Schmal	Time trial	26.6	3rd place, bronze medalist(s)
Adolf Schmal	10 km	Unknown	3rd place, bronze medalist(s)
Adolf Schmal	100 km	DNF	
Adolf Schmal	12 hour race	295.300 km	1st place, gold medalist(s)

== Fencing ==
Schmal also competed in the sabre fencing tournament, placing fourth in the five-man round robin.

Athlete	Event	Final		
Athlete	Event	MW	ML	Rank
Adolf Schmal	Men's sabre	1	3	4

== Swimming ==
Two Austrian swimmers competed in 1896. One of the two competed in each of the three open events, and each swimmer won one medal.

Athlete	Event	Final	
Athlete	Event	Time	Rank
Otto Herschmann	100 m freestyle	1:22.8	2nd place, silver medalist(s)
Paul Neumann	500 m freestyle	8:12.6	1st place, gold medalist(s)
Otto Herschmann	500 m freestyle	DNS	
Paul Neumann	1200 m freestyle	DNF	
