= Cycling at the 1896 Summer Olympics – Men's track time trial =

Cycling at the Olympics

Men's track time trial at the Games of the I Olympiad
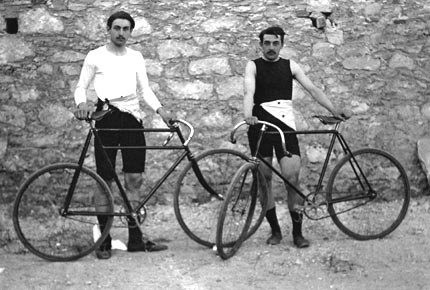
- The french participants Flameng and Masson
- Venue: Neo Phaliron Velodrome
- Date: 11 April 1896
- Competitors: 8 from 5 nations

Medalists
1st place, gold medalist(s)		Paul Masson; France
2nd place, silver medalist(s)		Stamatios Nikolopoulos; Greece
3rd place, bronze medalist(s)		Adolf Schmal; Austria

The men's time trial was one of 5 track cycling events on the Cycling at the 1896 Summer Olympics programme. It was the fourth event on the cycling schedule and was held on 11 April. The first time trial competition was the only time that Olympic time trials were held over the distance of one-third of a kilometre; when the event returned to the programme at the 1928 Summer Olympics the distance was set at one kilometre.

== Background ==
This was the first appearance of the event, which would not be held again until 1928 (after which it would be held every Games until dropped from the programme after 2004). This was the only time the event was held over a distance of one-third of a kilometre, rather than the one kilometre usually used. Paul Masson of France was the most significant cyclist in the small field, having won a "major international race" in 1894.

== Competition format ==
The event was a time trial on the track. In 1896, the distance was one-third of a kilometre, which was one lap around the track. A flying start was used.

== Schedule ==
The exact time of the event is not known; the cycling events began shortly after 2 p.m. and the time trial was the third event, after the 2 kilometres and 10 kilometres races.

Date		Time	Round
Gregorian	Julian	Time	Round
Saturday, 11 April 1896	Saturday, 30 March 1896		Final

== Results ==
The time trial race was once around the track, or one-third of a kilometre. It was held on 11 April and eight cyclists competed. Masson won his third race of the day, with Schmal and Nikolopoulos tying for second place and having to compete in a race-off for the second position.

Rank	Cyclist	Nation	Time	Notes
1st place, gold medalist(s)	Paul Masson	France	24.0	
2	Stamatios Nikolopoulos	Greece	26.0	Race-off
2	Adolf Schmal	Austria	26.0	Race-off
4	Edward Battell	Great Britain	26.2	
5	Frederick Keeping	Great Britain	27.0	
5	Theodor Leupold	Germany	27.0	
5	Léon Flameng	France	27.0	
8	Joseph Rosemeyer	Germany	27.2	

=== Race-off ===
In this race, Nikolopoulos improved upon his time from the first round, winning the race for an overall second-place finish. Schmal was slower in this race than he had been in the first one.

Rank	Cyclist	Nation	Time
2nd place, silver medalist(s)	Stamatios Nikolopoulos	Greece	25.4
3rd place, bronze medalist(s)	Adolf Schmal	Austria	26.6
