= Joseph Rosemeyer =

German cyclist

Josef Rosemeyer
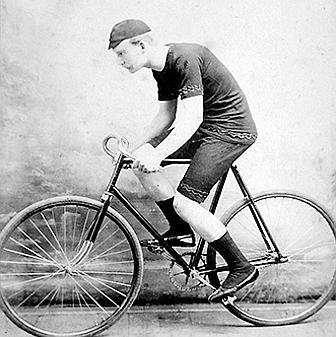
- Rosemeyer in 1896

Personal information
- Born: 13 March 1872 Lingen, Germany
- Died: 1 December 1919 (aged 47) Cologne, Germany

Cycling career
- Sport: Cycling
- Discipline: Track
- Role: Rider

Professional team
- 1896: German Olympic Cycling Team

Joseph Rosemeyer (13 March 1872 in Lingen – 1 December 1919 in Cologne) was a German track cyclist. He competed at the 1896 Summer Olympics in Athens.

Rosemeyer finished fourth in the 10 kilometres event. He also competed in the time trial competition and finished eighth. In the sprint event he was unable to finish the race due to having mechanical problems. He also did not finish the 100 kilometres contest.
