= Miltiades Iatrou =

Greek cyclist

Miltiades Iatrou was a Greek cyclist. He competed at the 1896 Summer Olympics in Athens. Iatrou competed in the road race, an 87 kilometre competition that took cyclists from Athens to Marathon and back. He did not finish in the top three, though his exact place among the fourth through seventh place cyclists is unclear.
