= France at the 1896 Summer Olympics =

- IOC code: FRA
- NOC: French Olympic Committee

in Athens, Greece April 6, 1896 – April 15, 1896
- Competitors: 11 in 6 sports and 18 events
- Medals Ranked 4th: Gold 5 Silver 4 Bronze 2 Total 11

Summer Olympics appearances (overview)
- 1896; 1900; ~~1904~~; 1908; 1912; 1920; 1924; 1928; 1932; 1936; 1948; 1952; 1956; 1960; 1964; 1968; 1972; 1976; 1980; 1984; 1988; 1992; 1996; 2000; 2004; 2008; 2012; 2016; 2020; 2024; 2028

Other related appearances
- 1906 Intercalated Games

France competed at the 1896 Summer Olympics in Athens, Greece, from 6 to 15 April 1896. French athletes had appeared in every Summer Olympic Games of the modern era, alongside Australia, Great Britain, and Greece. France won the fourth-most gold medals with 5 and the fourth-most total medals with 11. Cycling was the sport in which the French competitors had the most success, as they completely dominated the field. The French team had 27 entries in 18 events, winning 11 medals.

== Medalists ==
The following competitors won medals at the games. In the discipline sections below, the medalists' names are bolded.

| Medal | Name | Sport | Event | Date |
|---|---|---|---|---|
| Gold | Paul Masson | Cycling | Men's 10 km | April 11 |
| Gold | Paul Masson | Cycling | Men's time trial | April 11 |
| Gold | Paul Masson | Cycling | Men's sprint | April 11 |
| Gold | Léon Flameng | Cycling | Men's 100 km | April 8 |
| Gold | Eugène-Henri Gravelotte | Fencing | Men's foil | April 7 |
| Silver | Alexandre Tuffère | Athletics | Men's triple jump | April 6 |
| Silver | Léon Flameng | Cycling | Men's 10 km | April 11 |
| Silver | Henri Callot | Fencing | Men's foil | April 7 |
| Silver | Joanni Perronet | Fencing | Men's masters foil | April 7 |
| Bronze | Albin Lermusiaux | Athletics | Men's 1500 m | April 7 |
| Bronze | Léon Flameng | Cycling | Men's sprint | April 11 |

Medals by sport
| Sport | 1st place, gold medalist(s) | 2nd place, silver medalist(s) | 3rd place, bronze medalist(s) | Total |
| Cycling | 4 | 1 | 1 | **6** |
| Fencing | 1 | 2 | 0 | **3** |
| Athletics | 0 | 1 | 1 | **2** |
| Total | 5 | 4 | 2 | 11 |

=== Multiple medalists ===
The following competitors won multiple medals at the 1896 Olympic Games.

| Name | Medal | Sport | Event |
|---|---|---|---|
| Paul Masson | Gold; Gold; Gold | Cycling | Men's track time trial Men's sprint Men's 10 kilometres |
| Léon Flameng | Gold; Silver; Bronze | Cycling | Men's 100 kilometres Men's 10 kilometres Men's sprint |

== Competitors ==
The following is the list of number of competitors in the Games.

| Sport | Men | Women | Total |
|---|---|---|---|
| Athletics | 5 | 0 | 5 |
| Cycling | 2 | 0 | 2 |
| Fencing | 3 | 0 | 3 |
| Gymnastics | 1 | 0 | 1 |
| Shooting | 1 | 0 | 1 |
| Tennis | 1 | 0 | 1 |
| Total | 11 | 0 | 11 |

Medals by day
| Day | Date | 1st place, gold medalist(s) | 2nd place, silver medalist(s) | 3rd place, bronze medalist(s) | Total |
| 1 | 6 April | 0 | 1 | 0 | 1 |
| 2 | 7 April | 1 | 2 | 1 | 4 |
| 3 | 8 April | 1 | 0 | 0 | 1 |
| 4 | 9 April | 0 | 0 | 0 | 0 |
| 5 | 10 April | 0 | 0 | 0 | 0 |
| 6 | 11 April | 3 | 1 | 1 | 5 |
| 7 | 12 April | 0 | 0 | 0 | 0 |
| 8 | 13 April | 0 | 0 | 0 | 0 |
| Total | | 5 | 4 | 2 | 11 |

== Athletics ==
The five French athletes won two medals between them. Tuffère appears to have entered the 100-metre event but did not start; some sources have André Tournois in the first heat of the 100-metre event instead of Adolphe Grisel. Grisel entered the triple jump, but did not start.

Track & road events

| Athlete | Event | Heat | | Final | |
| Athlete | Event | Time | Rank | Time | Rank |
|---|---|---|---|---|---|
| Adolphe Grisel | 100 m | Unknown | 4 | Did not advance | |
| Alexandre Tuffèri | 100 m | DNS | | Did not advance | |
| Adolphe Grisel | 400 m | Unknown | 3-4 | Did not advance | |
| Georges de la Nézière | 400 m | DNS | | Did not advance | |
| Frantz Reichel | 400 m | 1:02.3 | 3 | Did not advance | |
| Albin Lermusiaux | 800 m | 2:16.6 | 1 Q | DNS | |
| Georges de la Nézière | 800 m | Unknown | 3 | Did not advance | |
| Frantz Reichel | 800 m | DNS | | Did not advance | |
| Albin Lermusiaux | 1500 m | —N/a | | 4:36.0 | 3rd place, bronze medalist(s) |
| Georges de la Nézière | 1500 m | —N/a | | DNS | |
| Frantz Reichel | 110 m hurdles | Unknown | 3 | Did not advance | |
| Albin Lermusiaux | 1500 m | —N/a | | DNF | |

Field events

| Athlete | Event | Final | |
| Athlete | Event | Distance | Position |
|---|---|---|---|
| Adolphe Grisel | Men's long jump | 5.83 | 5 |
| Alexandre Tuffèri | Men's long jump | 5.98 | 4 |
| Adolphe Grisel | Men's triple jump | DNS | |
| Alexandre Tuffèri | Men's triple jump | 12.70 | 2nd place, silver medalist(s) |
| Louis Adler | Men's shot put | DNS | |
| Adolphe Grisel | Men's shot put | DNS | |
| Louis Adler | Men's discus throw | DNS | |
| Adolphe Grisel | Men's discus throw | Unknown | 5-9 |

== Cycling ==
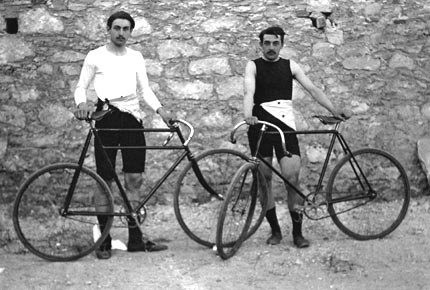
Leon Flameng and Paul Masson

France dominated the cycling events, taking 4 of the 6 gold medals. Three were won by Paul Masson who won every event he entered, with Léon Flameng adding the fourth as well as a silver and a bronze. One of the two won each event that a Frenchman contested; the two gold medals won by other countries were in competitions that Masson and Flameng did not enter.

=== Track ===
| Athlete | Event | Time / Distance | Rank |
|---|---|---|---|
| Paul Masson | Men's time trial | 24.0 | 1st place, gold medalist(s) |
| Léon Flameng | Men's sprint | Unknown | 3rd place, bronze medalist(s) |
| Paul Masson | Men's sprint | 4:58.2 | 1st place, gold medalist(s) |
| Léon Flameng | 10 km | 17:54.8 | 2nd place, silver medalist(s) |
| Paul Masson | 10 km | 17:54.2 | 1st place, gold medalist(s) |
| Léon Flameng | 100 km | 3:08:19.2 | 1st place, gold medalist(s) |
| Paul Masson | 100 km | DNS | |

== Fencing ==
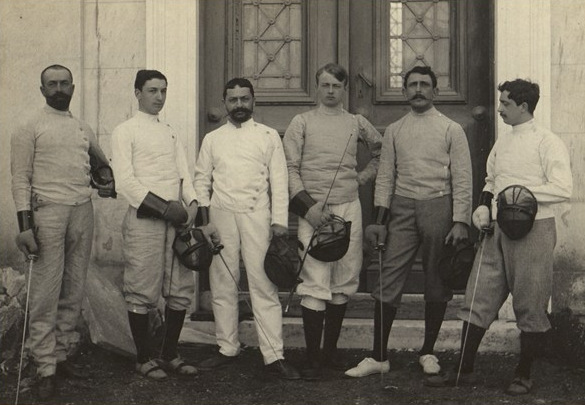
Group of French and Greek fencers at 1896 Summer Olympics

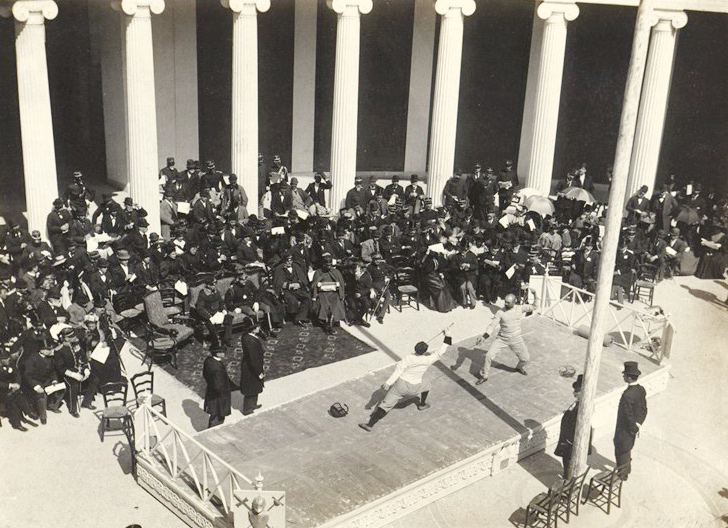
The final sword match 1896 Summer Olympics

The French fencers were held in high regard prior to the Games; Gravelotte and Callot validated those expectations in the amateur foil competition. Each went undefeated in their pool, advancing to face each other in the final. Gravelotte won the first-to-3 bout. Surprisingly, however, Perronet lost to the Greek Leonidas Pyrgos in the only match of the masters competition.

| Athlete | Event | Round 1 | | | Final | |
| Athlete | Event | MW | ML | Rank | Opposition Score | Rank |
|---|---|---|---|---|---|---|
| Henri Callot | Men's foil | 3 | 0 | 1 Q | Gravelotte (FRA); L 1–3 | 2nd place, silver medalist(s) |
| Eugène-Henri Gravelotte | Men's foil | 3 | 0 | 1 Q | Callot (FRA); W 3–1 | 1st place, gold medalist(s) |
| Henri de Laborde | Men's foil | 1 | 2 | 3 | Did not advance | 5 |
| Joanni Perronet | Men's masters foil | —N/a | | | Pyrgos (GRE); L 1–3 | 2nd place, silver medalist(s) |

== Gymnastics ==
Grisel competed in the parallel bars in the gymnastics program. The competitions had no formal scoring, the judges merely selecting the winner and runner-up. Grisel was neither in this competition.

=== Artistic ===
| Athlete | Event | Result | Rank |
|---|---|---|---|
| Adolphe Grisel | Parallel bars | Unknown | 3–18 |

== Shooting ==
Lermusiaux entered the military rifle event in the shooting program. His score and placing are unknown.

| Athlete | Event | Hits | Score | Rank |
|---|---|---|---|---|
| Albin Lermusiaux | 200 m military rifle | Unknown | Unknown | 14–41 |

== Tennis ==
Only the first initial and last name of the French tennis player in 1896 is known. He was defeated in the first round of the singles tournament.

| Athlete | Event | First round | Quarterfinals | Semifinals | Final | |
| Athlete | Event | Opposition Score | Opposition Score | Opposition Score | Opposition Score | Rank |
|---|---|---|---|---|---|---|
| J. Defert | Singles | Kasdaglis (GRE); L | Did not advance | | | =8 |
