= Cycling at the 1896 Summer Olympics – Men's sprint =

Cycling at the Olympics

Men's sprint at the Games of the I Olympiad
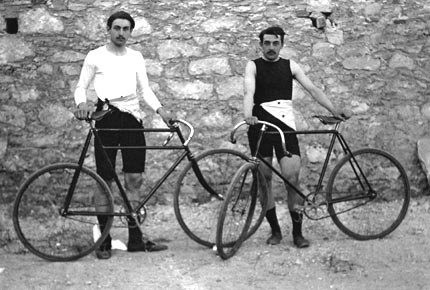
- The French medalists Flameng and Masson
- Venue: Neo Phaliron Velodrome
- Date: 11 April 1896
- Competitors: 4 from 3 nations

Medalists
1st place, gold medalist(s)		Paul Masson; France
2nd place, silver medalist(s)		Stamatios Nikolopoulos; Greece
3rd place, bronze medalist(s)		Léon Flameng; France

The men's sprint was one of the five track cycling events on the Cycling at the 1896 Summer Olympics programme. It was held on 11 April as the second event on the schedule. It was held over the distance of 2 kilometres, or six laps of the track. The event was won by Paul Masson of France, with his teammate Léon Flameng earning bronze. Stamatios Nikolopoulos of Greece took silver

== Background ==
This was the first appearance of the event, which has been held at every Summer Olympics except 1904 and 1912.

== Competition format ==
The event featured a single race, with all four competitors starting together. The distance was 2 kilometres, or six laps around the 1/3 kilometre track.

== Schedule ==
The exact time of the event is not known; the cycling events began shortly after 2 p.m. and the sprint was the first event.

Date		Time	Round
Gregorian	Julian	Time	Round
Saturday, 11 April 1896	Saturday, 30 March 1896		Final

== Results ==
The race was very slow and tactical, with no pacemakers: Rosemeyer was forced to retire after having mechanical problems.

Masson broke away late to beat Nikolopoulos by 15 meters, and Flameng finished well back in third.

Rank	Cyclist	Nation	Time
1st place, gold medalist(s)	Paul Masson	France	4:58.2
2nd place, silver medalist(s)	Stamatios Nikolopoulos	Greece	5:00.2
3rd place, bronze medalist(s)	Léon Flameng	France	Unknown
—	Joseph Rosemeyer	Germany	DNF
