= Konstantinos Konstantinou (cyclist) =

Greek cyclist

Konstantinos Konstantinou was a Greek cyclist. He competed at the 1896 Summer Olympics in Athens.

Konstantinou competed in the road race, an 87 kilometre competition that took cyclists from Athens to Marathon and back. He did not finish in the top three, though his exact place among the fourth through seventh place cyclists is unclear. He also competed in the 12-hour race and was among the four cyclists that dropped out after about three hours.
