= Adolphe Grisel =

French athlete and gymnast (1872–1942)

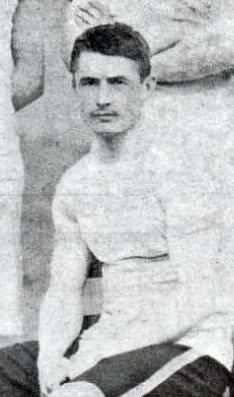
- Grisel in 1896

Personal information
- Full name: Adolphe Jules Grisel
- Born: 9 December 1872 Paris, France
- Died: 13 December 1942 (aged 70) Saint-Quentin, Aisne, German-occupied France
- Height: 1.65 m (5 ft 5 in)

Sport
- Sport: Athletics, gymnastics

Gymnastics career
- Discipline: Men's artistic gymnastics
- Country represented: France

Adolphe Jules Grisel (9 December 1872 – 13 December 1942) was a French athlete and gymnast. He competed at the 1896 Summer Olympics in Athens.

From 1895, Grisel was affiliated with the Racing Club de France. He was the French National long jump champion in 1896, with a jump of 6.23 metres, and the runner-up in 1893, 1895 and 1898; he placed third in the sport in 1894. He was also the runner-up in the 400 metre hurdles in the French national championship in 1895.

At the 1896 Summer Olympics in Athens, Grisel competed in five different events, four in athletics and one in gymnastics. On April 6, he came fourth out of five in his heat in the 100 metres and so failed to qualify for the finals. In the 400 metres, his failure to place in the top two in his heat again disqualified him from progressing further. He also competed in the discus: there is no no record of the distance that he threw, but he was not among the top four of the nine participants in the competition.

On April 7, Grisel returned to the Panathenaic Stadium to compete in the long jump. Again there is no official record of his result, but unofficial reports say that he jumped 5.83 metres and finished in fifth place.

After a two-day break, Grisel competed in the parallel bars gymnastics event; Alfred Flatow (gold) and Louis Zutter (silver) were the only athletes awarded medals, and there is no official record of the results achieved by the other sixteen gymnasts involved. Grisel concluded his participation in the Games by supporting his compatriot Albin Lermusiaux, accompanying Lermusiaux on a bicycle as he competed in the marathon.

He studied at Beaux-Arts de Paris and later became an architect.
