= Georgios Aspiotis =

Greek cyclist

Cycling career
- Sport: Cycling
- Discipline: Road
- Role: Rider

Amateur team
- Kerkyra

Georgios Aspiotis (Γεώργιος Ασπιοτισ) was a Greek cyclist and publisher. He competed at the 1896 Summer Olympics in Athens.

== Career ==
Aspiotis was a member of Kerkyra. He competed in the road race, an 87 kilometre competition that took cyclists from Athens to Marathon and back. He did not finish in the top three, though his exact place among the fourth through seventh place cyclists is not documented.
