= Georgios Koletis =

Greek cyclist

Cycling career
- Sport: Cycling
Medal record
Men's road bicycle racing
Representing Greece
Olympic Games
Silver medal – second place	1896 Athens	100 kilometres

Georgios Koletis (Greek: Γεώργιος Κολέτης) was a Greek cyclist. He competed at the 1896 Summer Olympics in Athens, winning a silver medal.

== Career ==
Koletis competed in the 10 and 100-kilometres races. He finished second in the 100 kilometers, behind Léon Flameng of France. Koletis and Flameng were the only two to finish. When Flameng crossed the finish line, Koletis had completed 289 of the 300 laps required. In the 10 kilometers race, Koletis quit after 7 kilometers due to injuries sustained by colliding with countryman Aristidis Konstantinidis two-thirds of the way through the race.
