= Adolf Schmal =

Austrian fencer and cyclist (1872–1919)

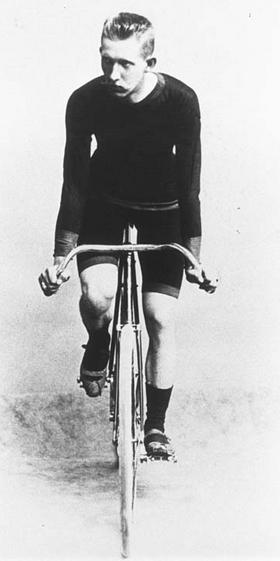

Personal information
- Full name: Felix Adolf Schmal
- Born: 18 September 1872 Dortmund, German Empire
- Died: 28 August 1919 (aged 46) Salzburg, Austria
Medal record
Men's cycling
Representing Austrian Empire
Olympic Games
Gold medal – first place	1896 Athens	12 hour race
Bronze medal – third place	1896 Athens	333 metres time trial
Bronze medal – third place	1896 Athens	10 kilometres

Felix Adolf Schmal (18 September 1872 – 28 August 1919) was an Austrian fencer and racing cyclist. He was born in Dortmund and died in Salzburg. He competed at the 1896 Summer Olympics in Athens.

== 1896 Olympics ==
With a fencing mask, sabre and a racing bike, Schmal got a train ticket and headed for Athens, Greece for the first Olympics, and on 8 April 1896, he competed in the 100 km cycling race, but like seven other starters from the original ten he didn't finish the race. The next day he was competing in the sabre fencing event, and was looking at a medal having won both his opening two rounds, but then enter the King and his entourage and the officials decided to start the event again, in which Schmal only won one out of his four rounds. After a day off, Schmal was back in the saddle and winning two bronze medals, in the time trial Schmal finished on a time of 26 seconds which matched the time of Stamatios Nikolopoulos in second place behind the Frenchman Paul Masson, but Nikolopoulos won the race-off and Schmal finished in third place, he also finished in third place in the 10 km race behind the French duo of Léon Flameng and winner Paul Masson. On 13 April, Schmal won his gold medal in the 12 hour race, seven cyclists started the race and by lap 10 Schmal had lapped them all, so he then kept on the wheel of Englishman Frederick Keeping for the rest of the race, only Schmal and Keeping finished the race.

== Writing ==
Schmal was also a journalist like his father and later an author, he would later write under the name of Adolf Schmal-Filius, his most popular book was written in 1904 called "Ohne Chauffeur" a "Handbook for Motorcyclists"
