= Frederick Keeping =

British racing cyclist (1867–1950)

Personal information
- Full name: Frederick Keeping
- Born: 11 August 1867 Pennington, England
- Died: 21 February 1950 (aged 82) Lymington, England

Cycling career
- Sport: Cycling
- Discipline: Road
- Role: Rider
Medal record
Representing Great Britain
Men's track cycling
Olympic Games
Silver medal – second place	1896 Athens	12 hour race

Frederick Keeping (11 August 1867 – 21 February 1950) was a British racing cyclist. He competed at the 1896 Summer Olympics in Athens.

Keeping competed in the 333 metres and 12 hours races. In the 12 hours race, Keeping was one of only two cyclists to finish, covering 314.664 kilometres. He was only one lap behind the winner, Adolf Schmal, who covered 314.997 kilometres. Keeping tied with two others for fifth place in the 333m, with 27.0 seconds.

== Amateurism protests ==
He kept working as a servant at the British Embassy in Greece. There were objections that he and another rider, Edward Battell, worked for a living. That made them "not gentlemen so they could not possibly be amateurs." The historian Mike Price said: "Gentlemen were not paid so were true amateurs. Servants had to be paid and so lost any claims to being amateur. Such was the attitude of the day". The protests were overruled.

== Olympic 12-hour race ==
Six riders started the 12-hour race at 5am, four of them from Greece, and just two finished, "in total distress".

Richard D. Mandell, in his book The First Modern Olympics, wrote: "Neither had eaten and had only sipped liquid. They were squalid from excreta and delirious from fatigue... their legs swollen gruesomely... both could be heard weeping."

Adolf Schmal of Austria completed 900 laps of the velodrome to finish one lap ahead of Keeping. Rain and wind meant there were few spectators and those that were there lost interest because the race was "a monotonous sight."

== Later life ==
After returning home to Hampshire, he opened a cycle shop in Milford on Sea, and later garages in New Milton and Lymington. He served as a member of Lymington District Council and Hampshire County Council.

== Family ==
His son was Michael Keeping, who played football for Southampton and Fulham and became manager of Real Madrid in Spain.
