= Cycling at the 1896 Summer Olympics – Men's individual road race =

Men's road race at the Games of the I Olympiad
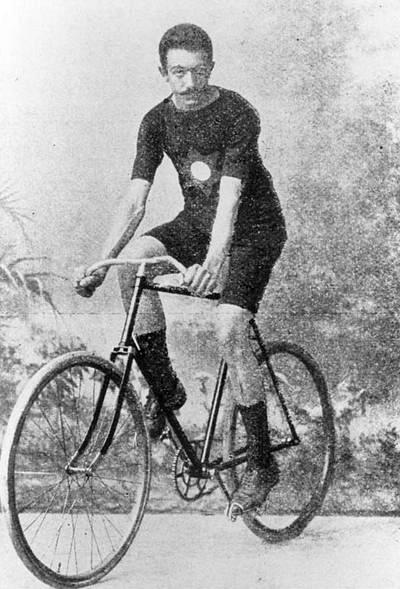
- Aristidis Konstantinidis
- Venue: Athens–Marathon
- Date: 12 April 1896
- Competitors: 7 from 3 nations

Medalists
| 1st place, gold medalist(s) | | Aristidis Konstantinidis; Greece |
| 2nd place, silver medalist(s) | | August von Gödrich; Germany |
| 3rd place, bronze medalist(s) | | Edward Battell; Great Britain |

The men's road race was the only road cycling event on the Cycling at the 1896 Summer Olympics programme. The course was 87 kilometres long and the race was held on 12 April. Seven cyclists from three nations competed. The event was won by Aristidis Konstantinidis of Greece. August von Gödrich of Germany took second, while Edward Battell finished third.

== Background ==
This was the first appearance of the event, which would not be held again until 1936 (though has been held at every Summer Olympics since then). It was an event of particular interest to the Greek hosts, as it followed the course of the marathon won by Spyridon Louis. Seven cyclists entered the event, including the German August von Gödrich, the British Edward Battell, and five Greeks. Battell, who worked at the British Embassy, almost did not get to compete; "[s]ome British officials attempted to prevent him from entering the Olympic cycling events on the grounds that his job disqualified him as a gentleman, and thus he could not be an amateur."

== Competition format ==
The race was on a course that covered 87 kilometres, running from Athens to Marathon and back. At the turn-around point, the cyclists had to "sign a document in the presence of an official, verifying that they had arrived there." The finish was at the velodrome. Officials were stationed all along the road.

== Schedule ==
| Date | | Time | Round |
| Gregorian | Julian | Time | Round |
|---|---|---|---|
| Sunday, 12 April 1896 | Sunday, 31 March 1896 | 12:00 | Final |

== Results ==
Konstantinidis led from the start until after the turn at Marathon. His bicycle broke down on the return journey, allowing Battel time to pass him before he was able to get another bicycle and continue. Both Konstantinidis and Battel fell again before finishing, with Battel's fall being severe enough to drop him from first place to third as both Konstantinidis and Gödrich passed him.

| Rank | Cyclist | Nation | Time |
|---|---|---|---|
| 1st place, gold medalist(s) | Aristidis Konstantinidis | Greece | 3:22:31 |
| 2nd place, silver medalist(s) | August von Gödrich | Germany | 3:42:18 |
| 3rd place, bronze medalist(s) | Edward Battell | Great Britain | Unknown |
| 4–7 | Georgios Aspiotis | Greece | Unknown |
| 4–7 | Miltiades Iatrou | Greece | Unknown |
| 4–7 | Konstantinos Konstantinou | Greece | Unknown |
| 4–7 | Georgios Paraskevopoulos | Greece | Unknown |
