= Stamatios Nikolopoulos =

Greek racing cyclist

Medal record

Men's track cycling

Representing Greece

Olympic Games
Silver medal – second place	1896 Athens	333 metres time trial
Silver medal – second place	1896 Athens	2 kilometres sprint

Stamatios Nikolopoulos was a Greek racing cyclist. He competed at the 1896 Summer Olympics in Athens winning two silver medals.

Nikolopoulos competed in the 333 metres and the 2 kilometres races, placing second in each to Frenchman Paul Masson. Nikolopoulos's time in the 2 kilometres was 5:00.2. He tied with Adolf Schmal for second at 26.0 seconds in the initial race of the 333 metres, and defeated Schmal in a race-off to take second place to himself. His time in the race-off was 25.4 seconds.
