= Léon Flameng =

French cyclist and pilot

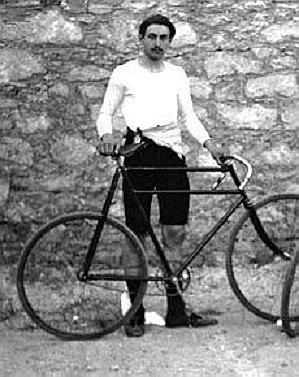
- Flameng at Athens 1896 Summer Olympics

Medal record

Representing France

Men's track cycling

Olympic Games
| Gold medal – first place | 1896 Athens | 100 kilometres |
| Silver medal – second place | 1896 Athens | 10 kilometres |
| Bronze medal – third place | 1896 Athens | 2 kilometres sprint |

Marie Léon Flameng (30 April 1877 – 12 January 1917) was a French cyclist and a World War I pilot. He competed at the 1896 Summer Olympics in Athens, winning three medals including one gold.

== Olympics ==
Flameng competed in four cycling track events at the 1896 Summer Olympics. On 8 April 1896, he competed in the 100 km race, which was 300 laps of the Neo Phaliron Velodrome. Of the nine starters, only two finished, with Flameng winning the gold medal 11 laps ahead of second place Georgios Kolettis from Greece. Two days later, he competed in three more events. He won a silver medal in the 10 km race, finishing just behind fellow countryman Paul Masson. He won the bronze medal in the sprint race, which was six laps around the Velodrome. He finished in joint fifth place in the time trial.

== Pilot ==
In 1898 he joined the 8th Infantry Division (France) to do his National Service. He then joined the French Air Force in 1914 as an observer, before becoming a military pilot in 1916. On 21 June 1916, while on a mission on Verdun, his plane was hit, and, although he was hit in the head with a bullet and his crew killed, he still managed to get his plane back to base. After being hospitalised, he returned to his squadron and was promoted to sergeant before transferring to the Group of Training Division. On 12 January 1917, while trialing a new Sopwith biplane near Ève, Oise, there was a technical incident forcing the plane to crash to the ground killing Flameng.

== See also ==
- List of Olympians killed in World War I
