= Paul Masson (cyclist) =

French cyclist (1876–1944)

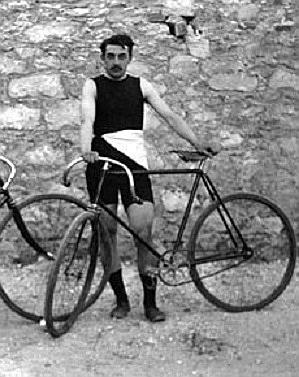
- Masson at Athens 1896 Summer Olympics

Personal information
- Full name: Paul Masson
- Born: 11 October 1876 Mostaganem, French Algeria
- Died: 30 November 1944 (aged 68) Cannes, France

Cycling career
- Sport: Cycling
- Discipline: Track
- Role: Rider
Medal record
Representing France
Men's track cycling
Olympic Games
Gold medal – first place	1896 Athens	Time trial
Gold medal – first place	1896 Athens	2 kilometres sprint
Gold medal – first place	1896 Athens	10 kilometres
World Championships
Bronze medal – third place	1897 Glasgow	Sprint

Paul Michel Pierre Adrien Masson (11 October 1876 – 30 November 1944) was a French cyclist who raced at the 1896 Summer Olympics in Athens.

In 1895, Masson's application for the French World Championship national team was rejected until later that same year he won two major races, securing his place on the team.

Masson was 19 when he raced in the 1896 Summer Olympics in three track cycling events, all on the same day, winning every one. In his first event at the Neo Phaliron Velodrome, the 2 km (1.2 mi) 6-lap sprint, there were only three other finishers, German Joseph Rosemeyer having dropped out early on. Masson won the race by two seconds ahead of Stamatios Nikolopoulos of Greece, and fellow Frenchman Léon Flameng. Masson's next race was the 10 km or 30 laps of the track, against five other riders. Both Greek riders collided early on it was left to Masson and his teammate Flameng, and Austrian Adolf Schmal, to battle it out. It went right down to the line with Masson just edging out Flameng. His final race was the time trial which was one lap against the clock. Against seven other riders, Masson finished in 24 seconds, two full seconds faster than Nikolopoulos.

After the Olympics he turned professional and changed his name to Paul Nassom, an anadrome of Masson. Without further major successes, his best finish was a third place in the 1897 World Professional Sprint Championships in Glasgow, Scotland.
