= Cycling at the 1896 Summer Olympics =

Cycling at the Games of the I Olympiad
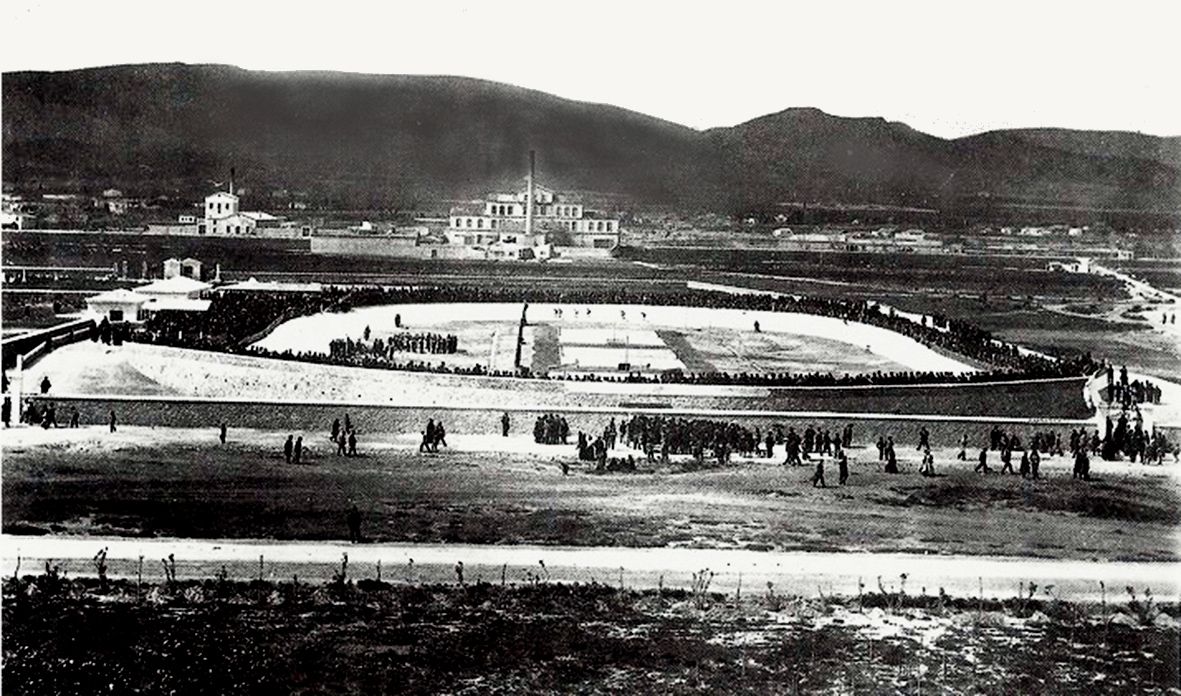
- New Phaleron Stadium in 1896
- Venues: Athens and surrounding area Neo Phaliron Velodrome
- Date: 8, 11–13 April 1896
- Competitors: 19 from 5 nations

At the 1896 Summer Olympics, six cycling events were contested at the Neo Phaliron Velodrome. They were organized and prepared by the Sub-Committee for Cycling. Events were held on 8 April, 11 April, 12 April and 13 April 1896. Nineteen cyclists, all men, from five nations competed.

== Medal summary ==
These medals were retroactively assigned by the International Olympic Committee; at the time, winners were given a silver medal and subsequent places received no award. Every nation won at least a silver medal, with three winning golds.

Event	Gold	Silver	Bronze
Road race	Aristidis Konstantinidis; Greece	August von Gödrich; Germany	Edward Battell; Great Britain
Track time trial	Paul Masson; France	Stamatios Nikolopoulos; Greece	Adolf Schmal; Austria
Sprint	Paul Masson; France	Stamatios Nikolopoulos; Greece	Léon Flameng; France
10 kilometres	Paul Masson; France	Léon Flameng; France	Adolf Schmal; Austria
100 kilometres	Léon Flameng; France	Georgios Kolettis; Greece	none awarded
12-hour race	Adolf Schmal; Austria	Frederick Keeping; Great Britain	none awarded

== Participating nations ==
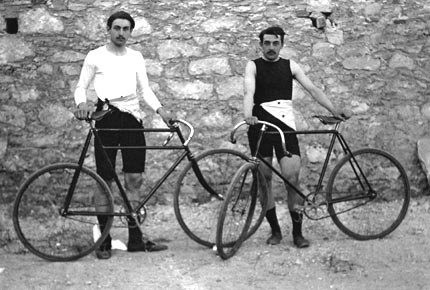
Léon Flameng and Paul Masson, the French cyclists who combined for six medals, four of them gold

A total of 19 cyclists from five nations competed at the Athens Games:

- Austria (1)
- France (2)
- Germany (5)
- Great Britain (2)
- Greece (9)(*)

(*) NOTE: Including one cyclist (Nikos Loverdos) from Smyrna who competed for Greece.

== Medal table ==
Rank	Nation	Gold	Silver	Bronze	Total
1	France	4	1	1	6
2	Greece	1	3	0	4
3	Austria	1	0	2	3
4	Great Britain	0	1	1	2
5	Germany	0	1	0	1
Totals (5 entries)		6	6	4	16

== Sub-Committee for Cycling ==
- Nicolas Vlangalis, president
- Const. Bellinis, secretary
- S. Mavros
- Nic. Kontojiannis
- Mar Philipp
- Jac. Theophilas

== See also ==
- List of Olympic medalists in cycling (men)
- List of Olympic medalists in cycling (women)
