= Neo Phaliron Velodrome =

Sports venue in Piraeus, Greece

Coordinates: 37°56′46.21″N 23°39′52.33″E

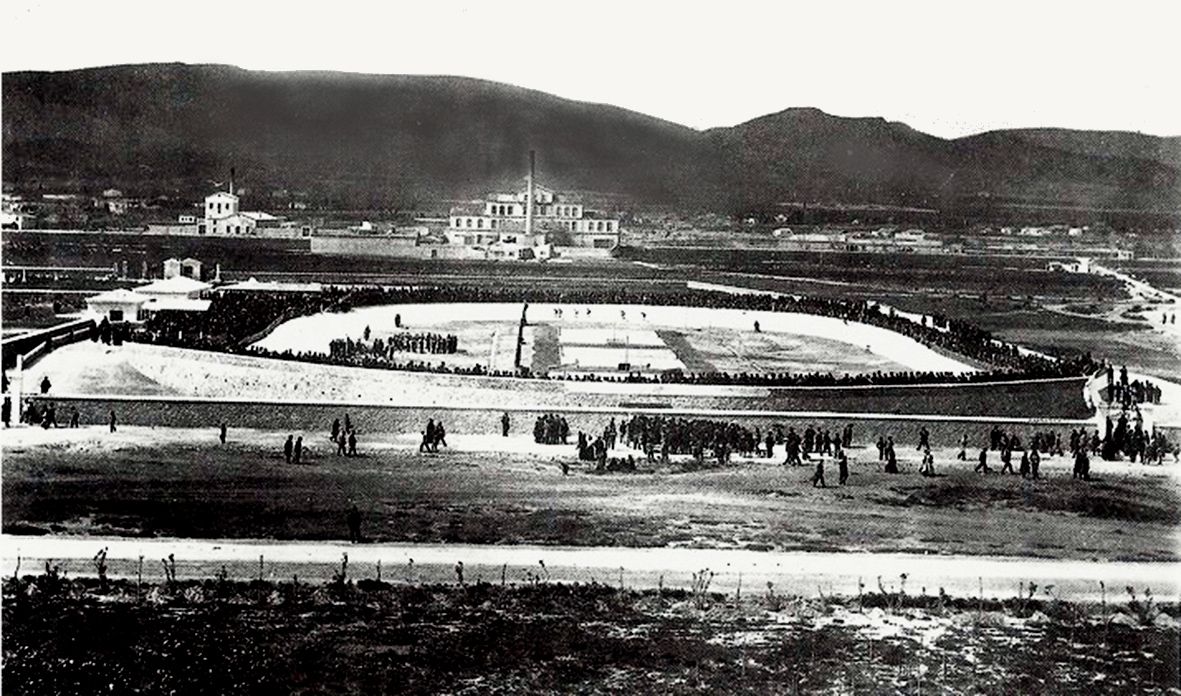

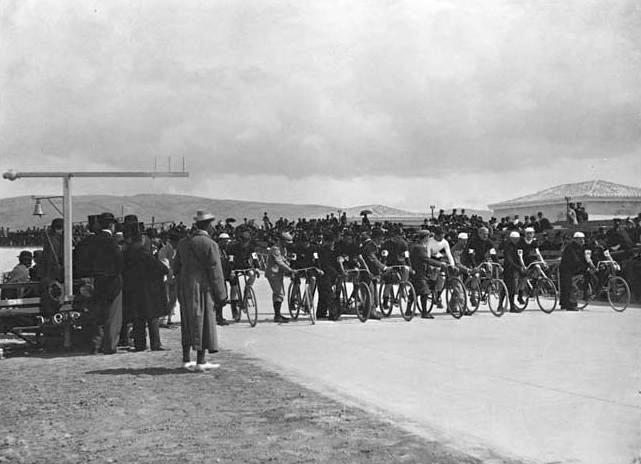
The start of the Olympic 100 km track race on March 27, 1896. This picture has been mirrored, as shown on page 196/241 of the Olympic report.

The Neo Phaliron Velodrome (New Phaleron) was a velodrome and sports arena in the Neo Faliro District of Piraeus, Greece, used for the cycling events at the 1896 Summer Olympics held in Athens. The property was donated by the Athens-Piraeus train company to the Hellenic Olympic Committee. It became the home of two football clubs which expanded into more sports: Ethnikos Piraeus (1923) and Olympiacos CFP (1925).

The venue was enlarged in 1964 and named after Georgios Karaiskakis, a Greek military commander and a leader of the Greek War of Independence, who died nearby the stadium. The second stadium hosted the 1969 European Athletics Championships and the 1971 European Cup Winners' Cup final.

The Georgios Karaiskakis Stadium was completely rebuilt in 2004, when it hosted several games of the football tournament in the 2004 Summer Olympics, including the women's Gold medal match. As of 2022, it has been the second largest football venue in Greece, with a capacity of 32,115 spectators.

== See also ==
- List of cycling tracks and velodromes
