= Vasilios Xydas =

Greek pole vaulter

Vasilios Xydas (Greek: Βασίλειος Ξυδάς, born 1877, date of death unknown) was a Greek athlete born in Athens, Greece. He competed at the 1896 Summer Olympics in Athens.

In 1896 Xydas competed in the pole vault. He earned the dubious distinction of being the only competitor to not receive a medal in that event, as he placed fifth while fellow Greeks Ioannis Theodoropoulos and Evangelos Damaskos tied for third behind Americans William Hoyt and Albert Tyler. There were only five athletes in the event. Xydas's best vault was 2.40 metres.
