= Athletics at the 1896 Summer Olympics – Men's 100 metres =

Men's 100 metres at the Games of the I Olympiad
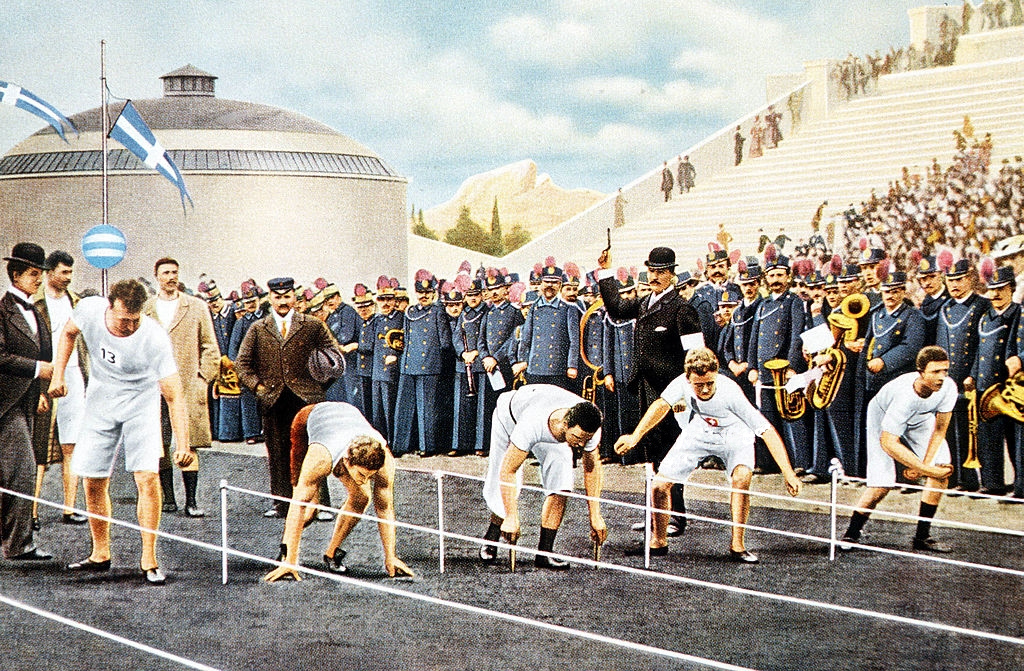
- Artist's rendering of the start of the 100 metres final
- Venue: Panathenaic Stadium
- Dates: 6 April 1896 (first round); 10 April 1896 (final)
- Competitors: 15 from 8 nations
- Winning time: 12.0

Medalists
1st place, gold medalist(s)		Thomas Burke	United States
2nd place, silver medalist(s)		Fritz Hofmann	Germany
3rd place, bronze medalist(s)		Alajos Szokolyi	Hungary
3rd place, bronze medalist(s)		Francis Lane	United States

The first heat of the men's 100 metres race was the first event run at the modern Olympics, on 6 April 1896. The event consisted of 3 heats and a final, held on 10 April. The 100 metres was the shortest race on the Athletics at the 1896 Summer Olympics programme. 15 athletes from 8 nations competed. The event was won by Thomas Burke of the United States. Fritz Hofmann of Germany took second, with Hungarian Alajos Szokolyi and American Francis Lane (who had won the first heat) tying for third. These competitors are recognized as gold, silver, and bronze medalists by the International Olympic Committee, though that award system had not yet been implemented in 1896.

== Background ==
Fritz Hofmann was probably the most prominent sprinter to enter the event; he had won the 1893 Championship of the Continent. Thomas Burke was the American champion in the 400 metres but had not distinguished himself yet in the 100 metres. Absent were top sprinters American Bernie Wefers and Englishman Charles Bradley.

== Competition format ==
21 athletes were entered in the first round, divided into three heats of seven runners, but six of them later withdrew. The top two athletes in each heat advanced to the final.

== Records ==
This was the standing world record (in seconds) prior to the 1896 Summer Olympics.

World Record	10.8 (Note: unofficial)	(United States) Luther Cary	Paris (FRA)	July 4, 1891
World Record	10.8	(United Kingdom) Cecil Lee	Brussels (BEL)	September 25, 1892
World Record	10.8	(Belgium) Étienne De Re	Brussels (BEL)	August 4, 1893
World Record	10.8	(United Kingdom) L. Atcherley	Frankfurt (GER)	April 13, 1895
World Record	10.8	(United Kingdom) Harry Beaton	Rotterdam (NED)	August 28, 1895

The following new Olympic record was set during this competition:

Date	Event	Athlete	Time	Notes
6 April 1896	Round 1	Thomas Burke (USA)	11.8 s	OR

In the first heat, Francis Lane set the inaugural Olympic Record of 12.2 seconds, tied in Heat 2 by Thomas Curtis. Thomas Burke then ran 11.8 seconds, which stood as the Olympic Record until the 1900 Olympics.

== Schedule ==
The precise times of the events are not recorded. For the first round, the heats began shortly after the arrival of King George I of Greece at 3 p.m. and the brief opening ceremony. The final was the first competition of the afternoon session on Friday.

Date		Round
Gregorian	Julian	Round
Monday, 6 April 1896	Monday, 25 March 1896	Round 1
Friday, 10 April 1896	Friday, 29 March 1896	Final

== Results ==
=== Heats ===
The first round of heats took place on 6 April. The first heat of the 100 metres was the first competition held in the Games. Francis Lane won the first heat, thus becoming the first winner of a modern Olympic race. All heats were won by athletes from the United States.

==== Heat 1 ====
The Official Report states that there were a total of 21 competitors, divided into three groups; there should therefore have been 7 athletes in each heat. The Official Report names only the top two runners, Lane and Szokolyi. Butler writes that the first heat had "two Hungarians, a Chilian, a Frenchman, a German, an Englishman and an American." Mallon & Widlund list Lane, Szokolyi, Gmelin, Grisel, and Doerry. Megede places André Tournois as the French competitor, rather than Grisel (who Megede does not list at all), omits Doerry (who Megede puts in heat 2), and includes Leonidasz Manno and Luis Subercaseaux. Olympedia follows Mallon & Widlund, also including Manno, Tournois, and Subercaseaux in a list of non-starters not attached to particular heats (this list includes 12 athletes, bringing Olympedia's total entrants to 27 rather than 21).

Rank	Athlete	Nation	Time	Notes
1	Francis Lane	United States	12.2	Q, OR
2	Alajos Szokolyi	Hungary	12.75	Q
3	Charles Gmelin	Great Britain	12.9	
4	Adolphe Grisel	France	Unknown	
5	Kurt Doerry	Germany	Unknown	
—	Leonidasz Manno	Hungary	DNS	
—	Luis Subercaseaux	Chile	DNS	

==== Heat 2 ====
The Official Report states that there were a total of 21 competitors, divided into three groups; there should therefore have been 7 athletes in each heat. The Official Report names only the top two runners, Curtis and Chalkokondylis. Butler writes of the second heat that Curtis beat "a Greek, an Englishman, two Frenchmen, a Dane, and a Hungarian." Mallon & Widlund list Curtis, Chalkokondylis, Elliot, Schmidt, and Marshall. Megede places Alexandre Tuffère as the French competitor, including him at 3rd place above Elliott; Megede also has Kurt Doerry in this heat instead of the first one (indicating he started but did not finish the heat) and omits Marshall entirely. Olympedia follows Mallon & Widlund, also including Tuffère in a list of non-starters not attached to particular heats. Other non-starters listed by Olympedia that could be a second Frenchman or a Hungarian to match Butler's list are André Tournois, Louis Adler, István Zachar, and Nándor Dáni.

Rank	Athlete	Nation	Time	Notes
1	Thomas Curtis	United States	12.2, =OR	Q
2	Alexandros Chalkokondylis	Greece	12.75	Q
3	Launceston Elliot	Great Britain	12.9	
4	Eugen Schmidt	Denmark	Unknown	
5	George Marshall	Great Britain	Unknown	
—	Alexandre Tuffère	France	DNS	
—	Unknown	Unknown (France or Hungary)	DNS	

==== Heat 3 ====
Both Burke and Hofmann were more well known for middle-distance events rather than sprinting. Burke's time of 11.8s became the standing Olympic record. It is not clear which athlete received which place between the fourth and fifth finishers.

The Official Report states that there were a total of 21 competitors, divided into three groups; there should therefore have been 7 athletes in each heat. The Official Report names only the top two runners, "an American (Burke)" and Hofmann. Butler writes of the final heat that Burke beat "a Swede, two Greeks, and three Germans." Mallon & Widlund list Burke, Hofmann, Traun, Gennimatas, and Sjöberg. Megede omits Traun, places Sjöberg 3rd and Gennimatas 5th, and includes Nándor Dáni at 4th. Olympedia follows Mallon & Widlund; non-starters (not attached to particular heats in Olympedia) include Flatow and Mouratis.

Rank	Athlete	Nation	Time	Notes
1	Thomas Burke	United States	11.8	Q, OR
2	Fritz Hofmann	Germany	12.75	Q
3	Friedrich Traun	Germany	13.6	
4–5	Georgios Gennimatas	Greece	Unknown	
4–5	Henrik Sjöberg	Sweden	Unknown	
—	Alfred Flatow	Germany	DNS	
—	Konstantinos Mouratis	Greece	DNS	

=== Final ===
The final of the 100 metre race, run on 10 April, involved the six runners who had finished in the top two of their preliminary heats. Curtis scratched from the final as he had also qualified for the final of the 110 metre hurdles, which was the next race on the program (Curtis won that race).

Burke beat his companion from the third heat, Hofmann, by two meters. In a thrilling contest for third place, Lane and Szokolyi dead-heated, both men beating Chalkokondylis by six inches. Lane and Szokolyi are both considered to be bronze medallists by the International Olympic Committee.

Rank	Athlete	Nation	Time
1st place, gold medalist(s)	Thomas Burke	United States	12.0
2nd place, silver medalist(s)	Fritz Hofmann	Germany	12.2
3rd place, bronze medalist(s)	Francis Lane	United States	12.6
3rd place, bronze medalist(s)	Alajos Szokolyi	Hungary	12.6
5	Alexandros Chalkokondylis	Greece	12.6
—	Thomas Curtis	United States	DNS

== Results summary ==
Rank	Athlete	Nation	Semifinals	Final	Notes
1st place, gold medalist(s)	Thomas Burke	United States	11.8	12.0	OR
2nd place, silver medalist(s)	Fritz Hofmann	Germany	12.6	12.2	
3rd place, bronze medalist(s)	Francis Lane	United States	12.2	12.6	
3rd place, bronze medalist(s)	Alajos Szokolyi	Hungary	12.8	12.6	
5	Alexandros Chalkokondylis	Greece	12.8	12.6	
6	Thomas Curtis	United States	12.2	DNS	
AC	Launceston Elliot	Great Britain	12.9	Did not advance	
AC	Charles Gmelin	Great Britain	12.9	Did not advance	
AC	Friedrich Traun	Germany	13.5	Did not advance	
AC	Eugen Schmidt	Denmark	Unknown	Did not advance	4th in semifinal
AC	Adolphe Grisel	France	Unknown	Did not advance	4th in semifinal
AC	Georgios Gennimatas	Greece	Unknown	Did not advance	4th–5th in semifinal
AC	Henrik Sjöberg	Sweden	Unknown	Did not advance	4th–5th in semifinal
AC	George Marshall	Great Britain	Unknown	Did not advance	5th in semifinal
AC	Kurt Doerry	Germany	Unknown	Did not advance	5th in semifinal
—	Louis Adler	France	DNS	Did not advance	
—	Harald Arbin	Sweden	DNS	Did not advance	
—	Nándor Dáni	Hungary	DNS	Did not advance	
—	Ralph Derr	United States	DNS	Did not advance	
—	Alfred Flatow	Germany	DNS	Did not advance	
—	Leonidasz Manno	Hungary	DNS	Did not advance	
—	Konstantinos Mouratis	Greece	DNS	Did not advance	
—	Luis Subercaseaux	Chile	DNS	Did not advance	
—	Jean Tournois	France	DNS	Did not advance	
—	Alexandre Tuffère	France	DNS	Did not advance	
—	Charles Vanoni	United States	DNS	Did not advance	
—	István Zachar	Hungary	DNS	Did not advance	
