= Athletics at the 1896 Summer Olympics – Men's 110 metres hurdles =

Men's 110 metres hurdles at the Games of the I Olympiad
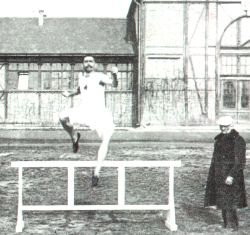
- Alajos Szokolyi hurdling
- Venue: Panathinaiko Stadium
- Dates: April 7, 1896 (heats); April 10, 1896 (final)
- Competitors: 8 from 6 nations
- Winning time: 17.6 OR

Medalists
1st place, gold medalist(s)		Thomas Curtis; United States
2nd place, silver medalist(s)		Grantley Goulding; Great Britain

The men's 110 metres hurdles was the only hurdling event on the Athletics at the 1896 Summer Olympics programme. The preliminary heats served as the inaugural track event of the day on 7 April. Eight competitors participated in two heats, each comprising four runners. Only the top two runners from each heat progressed to the final. The event was won by Thomas Curtis, representing the United States.

== Background ==
This event made its debut at the Olympics and has since been one of the 12 athletics disciplines featured at every Summer Olympics. Despite its longevity, it was not widely recognized. Notably absent were two prominent hurdlers: Stephen Chase from the United States and Godfrey Shaw from Great Britain. In Greece, Anastasios Andreou was considered untouchable. Grantley Goulding from Great Britain similarly held high expectations for himself. Alajos Szokolyi, having triumphed at the Hungarian Olympic trials, was also seen as a strong contender.

== Competition format ==
The competition structure included two semifinals followed by a final. Although seventeen athletes had initially entered, only eight actually competed, resulting in two semifinal heats.

The top two athletes from each semifinal heat progressed to the four-man final.

== Records ==
There was no standing Olympic record before the first Games.

World record	Stephen Chase (USA)	15.4y (Note: Set over 120 yards (109.72 metres))	New York	21 September 1895
Olympic record	New event	n/a	n/a	n/a

Each race set a new Olympic record. Grantley Goulding won the first semifinal in 18.4 seconds. Thomas Curtis won the second semifinal in 18.0 seconds. Curtis then won the final in 17.6 seconds to finish the Games with the Olympic record.

== Schedule ==
The precise times of the events are not recorded. The 110 metres hurdles semifinal round was the first event of the afternoon session on the second day, which began around "half past two". The final was the third event of the fifth day's afternoon.

Date		Round
Gregorian	Julian	Round
Tuesday, 7 April 1896	Tuesday, 26 March 1896	Semifinals
Friday, 10 April 1896	Friday, 29 March 1896	Final

== Results ==
=== Semifinals ===
The semifinal heats were held on 7 April. The top two finishers in each of the two heats advanced to the final.

==== Semifinal 1 ====
Grantley Goulding of Great Britain finished first, in a time of 18.4 seconds. Szokolyi was in the lead but hit the last hurdle and stumbled. It is not entirely clear what happened next. Goulding certainly passed Szokolyi and finished first. Szokolyi got up and crossed the finish line along with Reichel; there was some dispute over which had finished second and which third. Neither man competed in the final, eliminating a reliable way of resolving the dispute. The Official Report placed Szokolyi second. Mallon & Widlund place Reichel second. Ekkehard zur Megede places Szokolyi second. The IOC webpage lists Szokolyi as a finalist, suggesting he was second.

Rank	Athlete	Nation	Time	Notes
1	Grantley Goulding	Great Britain	18.4	Q, OR
2	Alajos Szokolyi	Hungary	Unknown	Q
3	Frantz Reichel	France	Unknown	
4	Anastasios Andreou	Greece	Unknown	

==== Semifinal 2 ====
The Americans finished 1st and 2nd in this heat, with Thomas Curtis advancing to the final with a time of 18 seconds, and Hoyt second. Athanasios Skaltsogiannis of Greece and Kurt Doerry of Germany also competed, though their final positions are not recorded.

Rank	Athlete	Nation	Time	Notes
1	Thomas Curtis	United States	18.0	Q, OR
2	William Hoyt	United States	Unknown	Q
3–4	Kurt Doerry	Germany	Unknown	
3–4	Athanasios Skaltsogiannis	Greece	Unknown	

=== Final ===
The final of the 110 metre hurdles was run on 10 April.

Hoyt scratched from the final in order to prepare for the pole vault (which he won).

As there are conflicting reports of who qualified in second from the first heat, there are conflicting reports of why that runner scratched: Mallon and Widlund have Reichel as second in the heat, and that he was forced to scratch from the final as he was serving as an assistant to Albin Lermusiaux in the marathon. Sources placing Szokolyi second rather than Reichel do not generally give a reason for Szokolyi's absence, but Szokolyi himself recounted that "[w]hen the final came — after a lot of negotiations we were both canceled as second."

The Official Report placed Szokolyi second in the heat, and says of both Hoyt and Szokolyi that "[n]o other competitor came forward," than Curtis and Goulding.

In any case, only two athletes competed, but they finished within one-tenth of a second: Goulding led at the final hurdle, being a better hurdler, but Curtis passed him in the straight and won a tight race by two inches.

Rank	Athlete	Nation	Time	Notes
1st place, gold medalist(s)	Thomas Curtis	United States	17.6	OR
2nd place, silver medalist(s)	Grantley Goulding	Great Britain	17.7	
—	William Hoyt	United States	DNS	
—	Alajos Szokolyi	Hungary	DNS	

== Results summary ==
Rank	Athlete	Nation	Semifinal	Final	Notes
1st place, gold medalist(s)	Thomas Curtis	United States	18.0	17.6	OR
2nd place, silver medalist(s)	Grantley Goulding	Great Britain	18.4	17.7	
3	William Hoyt	United States	Unknown	DNS	
3	Alajos Szokolyi	Hungary	Unknown	DNS	
5	Frantz Reichel	France	Unknown	Did not advance	3rd in semifinal
6	Kurt Doerry	Germany	Unknown	Did not advance	3rd–4th in semifinal
6	Athanasios Skaltsogiannis	Greece	Unknown	Did not advance	3rd–4th in semifinal
8	Anastasios Andreou	Greece	Unknown	Did not advance	4th in semifinal

== Notes ==
- Lampros, S.P.; Polites, N.G.; De Coubertin, Pierre; Philemon, P.J. & Anninos, C. (1897). The Olympic Games: BC 776 – AD 1896. Athens: Charles Beck. (Digitally available at la84foundation.org)
- Mallon, Bill & Widlund, Ture (1998). The 1896 Olympic Games. Results for All Competitors in All Events, with Commentary. Jefferson: McFarland. ISBN 0-7864-0379-9. (Excerpt available at la84foundation.org)
- Smith, Michael Llewellyn (2004). Olympics in Athens 1896. The Invention of the Modern Olympic Games. London: Profile Books. ISBN 1-86197-342-X.
