= Alajos Szokolyi =

Hungarian athlete

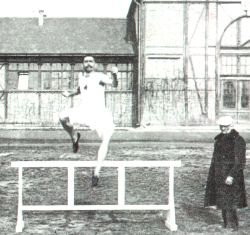
- Alajos Szokolyi

Personal information
- Nationality: Hungarian
- Born: 19 June 1871 Rónicz, Kingdom of Hungary, Austria-Hungary (now Hronec, Slovakia)
- Died: 9 September 1932 (aged 61) Bernece, Kingdom of Hungary

Sport
- Country: Hungary
- Sport: Track and field
- Events: 100 m, 110 m hurdles, triple jump, high jump
- Club: Magyar AC
- Coached by: John Cash
- Retired: 1900

Achievements and titles
- Personal bests: 100 m – 11.4 sec (1891); 110 m hurdles – 17.4 sec (1897); Triple jump – 12.48 m (1896)
Medal record
Men's athletics
Representing Hungary
Olympic Games
Bronze medal – third place	1896 Athens	100 metres

Alajos János Szokolyi (also referred to as Alajos Szokoly, Hungarian pronunciation: [ˈɒlɒjoʃ ˈsokoji]; Slovak: Alojz Sokol; 19 June 1871 – 9 September 1932) was a Hungarian athlete, sports organizer, sports manager, archivist and physician.

He competed at the 1896 Summer Olympics, winning the bronze medal in 100 metres dash. In the same year he also won the first ever edition of the Hungarian Athletics Championships in 100 yards dash.

== Early life ==
Szokolyi was born on 9 June 1871 in Rónicz, Kingdom of Hungary (now Hronec, Slovakia) as the first child József Szokoly, an engineer and Emília Holub. At the age of 3, he was adopted by his childless godparents, Alajos Schőnn, a veteran of the Hungarian Revolution of 1848 and Amália Szokoly, sister of Alajos' father. Szokolyi went to grammar school in Ipolyság (Šahy), subsequently he absolved the high school in Selmecbánya (Banská Štiavnica) and Léva (Levice). He excelled with his talent already in high school, having been nominated the "best gymnast of the school" while in fourth grade. He was also regularly awarded in the school-year ending gymnastic competitions. In 1887 Szokolyi with his family moved from Ipolyság to their new mansion in Bernece, lying just on the opposite side of the river Ipoly. Two years later he was enrolled at the medical faculty in Budapest.

== Career ==
=== Entering athletics and setback ===
In Budapest Szokolyi immediately joined the Magyar Athletikai Club (MAC). Founded in 1875, MAC was the first athletics club in continental Europe and played a pioneer role in developing sports in Hungary. Competing in the junior category – athletes who did not participate in public competitions before were regarded as juniors –, Szokolyi won his first race in the 100 metres dash at the 1890 autumn championships of MAC. (That time MAC organized a spring and a autumn championships every year.) Szokolyi participated in the seniors' race as well, finishing third in the 100 yards.

At the spring championships in the following year Szokolyi came second behind Samu Sajtos in 100 yards, however, at the 1891 autumn championships he won the 100 yards event confidently with a new Hungarian record and also triumphed in the quarter miles race.

After the initial successes his career suffered a minor setback as he joined the 3rd Imperial Tyrolian Rifle Regiment (Tiroler Kaiserjäger) and remained without training and competition opportunities for nearly two years. Szokolyi competed again in October 1893, but the long absence had obvious impact on his results — in the 100 yards and the high jump he remained without any success, while in the 120 yards hurdles he came second behind Menotti Réthy. The next two years passed without significant improvements, subsequently MAC contracted John Cash, an English coach. The combination of Cash's training methods and Szokolyi's tenacious work paid off in early 1896, when at the Olympic test race Szokoly won the 110 metres hurdles race, thus secured a place in the Hungarian Olympic Team.

=== 1896 Summer Olympics ===
Before leaving to Athens, Szokolyi accidentally slit his sole. As it is known from Nándor Dáni's travel diary, he suffered much from the injury, still, he became the joker of the team. The Hungarians gained a lot of popularity in Athens — they were the first foreigners to arrive, and their little but friendly team, that on the proposal Szokolyi wore hats with blue and white ribbons, the colors of the Greeks, quickly became favorites among the Athenians.

Szokolyi first competed in the 100 metres dash. He came in second in the heats, with a time of 12.75, and advanced to the final. There, Szokolyi was one of four athletes to come in at 12.6 seconds. The officials ruled that he and Francis Lane of the United States, who had beat Szokolyi in the heats, had finished in a dead heat for third place; Alexandros Khalkokondilis of Greece was ruled to have been slightly behind them. Szokolyi and Lane are currently considered to split the bronze medal for the event (no medals were awarded at the 1896 Olympics) by the International Olympic Committee. Szokolyi placed fourth in the triple jump, with a best effort of 11.26 metres.

Szokolyi was expected to achieve his best result in the 110 metres hurdles since many considered it as his strongest event, however, under controversial circumstances, he was not allowed to run in the final. According to the official announcement and the morning newspaper Akropolis, four qualifying heats were to be held with the respective winners progressing to the final. However, due to the absence of some contestants the athletes were combined to form two heats only. Szokoly, racing in the first heat, was in lead until hitting the final hurdle and stumbling, allowing Grantley Goulding to pass him and win the race. Szokolyi eventually came second and together with the top two of the other heat was supposed to run the final. Prior to the final, Szokolyi and Hoyt, the second placed of the other heat were pulled out, referring not to the rules of the International Olympic Committee but those of the Amateur Athletic Association, causing some controversy and bitterness in the Hungarian team. The event was won by American Thomas Curtis, who finished just inches ahead Goulding.

=== Later career and retirement ===
After the Olympic Games, at the annual spring championships Szokolyi competed in so-called handicap races, not being able to catch his opponents. He peaked and achieved his best results in the autumn championships, winning in 100 yard dash, 110 yard hurdles, triple jump and the relay event as well. The Hungarian Athletics Association, created in 1897, declared two races of the 1896 championships – the 100 yard and the 1 mile event – as official competitions, making Szokolyi and František Horn the first Hungarian Athletics Championships winners, respectively.

The year 1896 not only marked the first modern Olympic Games, but also the millennium of the Hungarian landtaking. On this occasion many prestigious sports competitions, shows and exhibitions were organized; Szokolyi, a celebrated sportsman of his time, was depicted on the promotional materials. Additionally, he participated in the organization of the events as the secretary of the National Gymnastic and Sports Committee (Országos Torna és Sportbizottság).

From 1896 onwards, Szokolyi concentrated less on competing and more on organizing and supervising sports events, and he eventually retired in 1900. Szokolyi raced over ten years; during this period he took part in 71 events in 29 competitions. He won 26 times, finished runner-up 16 times and came third 6 times. Additionally, he improved the Hungarian national record thirteen times in various events.

== Later life and death ==
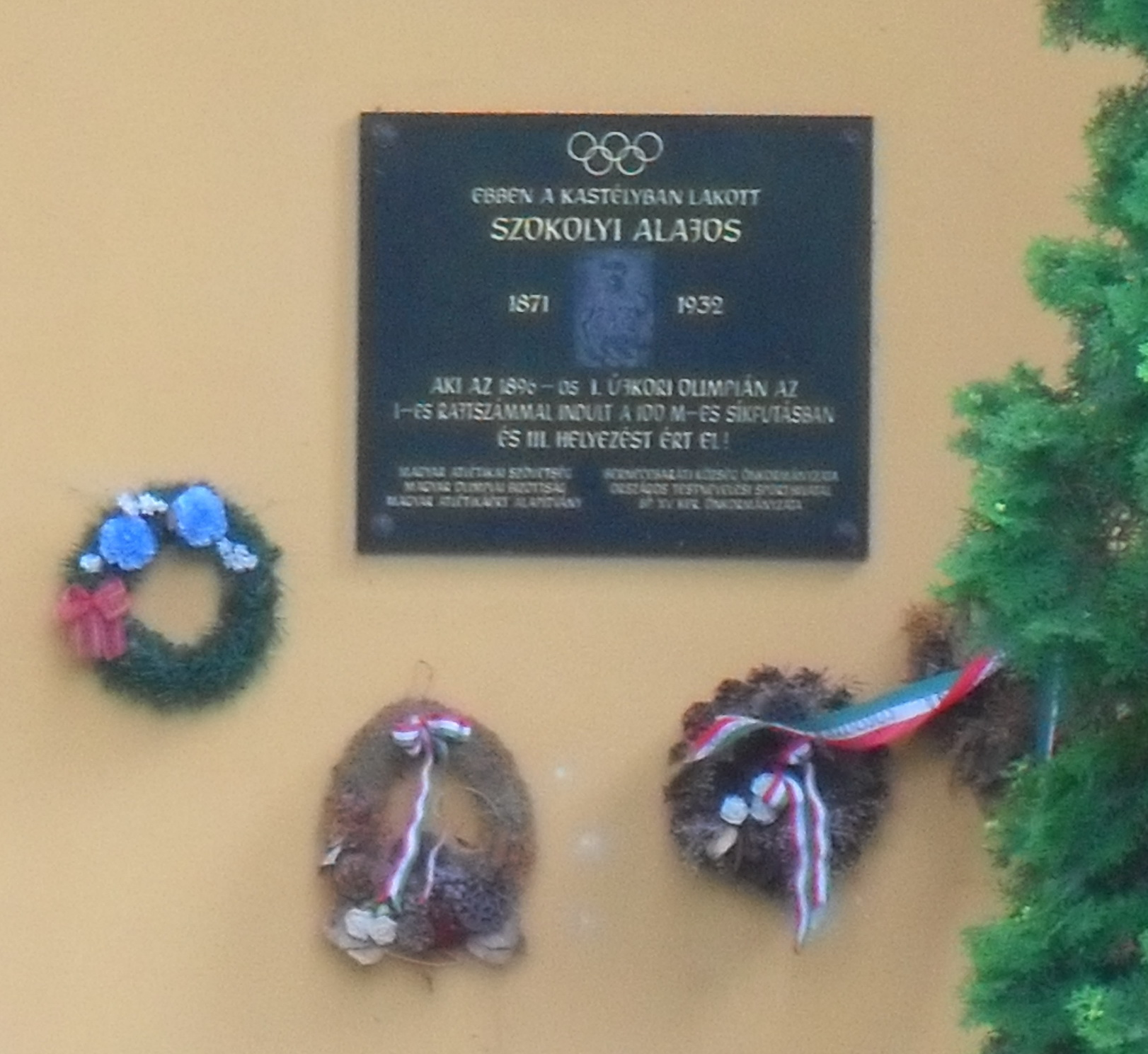
Memorial plaque on the Szokolyi mansion

Following his retirement, Szokolyi moved back to his estate in Bernece and married to Charlotte Berchtold on 27 November 1900. By this marriage Szokolyi became related to the country's most distinguished families – the Berchtolds, the Károlyis and the Bánffys. The couple had 5 children. Alajos was ordained priest, József took the military path and served by the hussars while Ferenc became an agronomist and also followed his father example in sports and achieved several notable results. Their daughters were Erzsébet and Mária. Erzsébet married to Count István Révay, founder-president of the Association of Physical Education of Hungarians in Czechoslovakia.

In 1906 Szokolyi founded the Sports Association of Hont County (Hont vármegyei Sport Egyesület), of which presidential position held until his resignation in 1912. In 1907 he was appointed as chief archivist of Hont County. In the 1910s he changed the spelling of his name to Szokolyi.

During the World War I he organized the medical service of the county as the chief physician of the military hospital in Ipolyság. After the war Ipolyság fell under Czechoslovak administration, subsequently Szokolyi retired to the family mansion in Bernece. In 1928 he was diagnosed with atherosclerosis. He died of a heart attack in 1932.
