= Sweden at the 2024 Summer Olympics =

Sweden at the Games of the XXXIII Olympiad in Paris

- IOC code: SWE
- NOC: Swedish Olympic Committee
- Website: www.sok.se (in Swedish and English)

in Paris, France 26 July 2024 – 11 August 2024
- Competitors: 118 (57 men and 61 women) in 18 sports
- Flag bearers (opening): Peder Fredricson and Josefin Olsson
- Flag bearers (closing): Anton Dahlberg and Tara Babulfath
- Medals Ranked 16th: Gold 4 Silver 4 Bronze 3 Total 11

Summer Olympics appearances (overview)
- 1896; 1900; 1904; 1908; 1912; 1920; 1924; 1928; 1932; 1936; 1948; 1952; 1956; 1960; 1964; 1968; 1972; 1976; 1980; 1984; 1988; 1992; 1996; 2000; 2004; 2008; 2012; 2016; 2020; 2024; 2028

Other related appearances
- 1906 Intercalated Games

Sweden competed at the 2024 Summer Olympics in Paris from 26 July to 11 August 2024. Swedish athletes have appeared in every edition of the Summer Olympic Games except for the sparsely attended St. Louis 1904. By prolonging their streak of winning an Olympic medal at every Olympic game since 1908 (and Finland ending theirs by failing to win a medal in Paris), Sweden became the first country in history with a 51 Olympic Games medalling streak.

Sweden had its most successful Summer Olympic Games since Sydney 2000, winning 4 gold, 4 silver and 3 bronze medals.

Sweden won its first ever medals in two sports, the duo Jonatan Hellvig and David Åhman won gold in beach volleyball and Tara Babulfath won a bronze in judo.

Sarah Sjöström won two Olympic gold medals in swimming, pushing her total to 6 Olympic medals of which 3 are gold, making her Sweden's most successful Olympic swimmer in history. Armand Duplantis became only the third Swedish athlete in history to defend an Olympic title in athletics.

Sweden also won its first medals in table tennis in 24 years through Kristian Karlsson, Anton Källberg and Truls Möregårdh.

== Medalists ==
Medal	Name	Sport	Event	Date
Gold	Sarah Sjöström	Swimming	Women's 100 m freestyle	31 July
Gold	Sarah Sjöström	Swimming	Women's 50 m freestyle	4 August
Gold	Armand Duplantis	Athletics	Men's pole vault	5 August
Gold	Jonatan Hellvig; David Åhman	Beach volleyball	Men's tournament	10 August
Silver	Victor Lindgren	Shooting	Men's 10 m air rifle	29 July
Silver	Vilma Bobeck; Rebecca Netzler	Sailing	Women's 49erFX	2 August
Silver	Truls Möregårdh	Table tennis	Men's singles	4 August
Silver	Anton Källberg; Kristian Karlsson; Truls Möregårdh	Table tennis	Men's team	9 August
Bronze	Tara Babulfath	Judo	Women's –48 kg	27 July
Bronze	Jenny Rissveds	Cycling	Women's cross-country	28 July
Bronze	Anton Dahlberg; Lovisa Karlsson	Sailing	Mixed 470	8 August

Medals by sport
Sport	1st place, gold medalist(s)	2nd place, silver medalist(s)	3rd place, bronze medalist(s)	Total
Swimming	2	0	0	2
Athletics	1	0	0	1
Volleyball	1	0	0	1
Table tennis	0	2	0	2
Sailing	0	1	1	2
Shooting	0	1	0	1
Cycling	0	0	1	1
Judo	0	0	1	1
Total	4	4	3	11

Medals by gender
Gender	1st place, gold medalist(s)	2nd place, silver medalist(s)	3rd place, bronze medalist(s)	Total
Female	2	1	2	5
Male	2	3	0	5
Mixed	0	0	1	1
Total	4	4	3	11

Medals by date
Date	1st place, gold medalist(s)	2nd place, silver medalist(s)	3rd place, bronze medalist(s)	Total
27 July	0	0	1	1
28 July	0	0	1	1
29 July	0	1	0	1
30 July	0	0	0	0
31 July	1	0	0	1
1 August	0	0	0	0
2 August	0	1	0	1
3 August	0	0	0	0
4 August	1	1	0	2
5 August	1	0	0	1
6 August	0	0	0	0
7 August	0	0	0	0
8 August	0	0	1	1
9 August	0	1	0	1
10 August	1	0	0	1
11 August	0	0	0	0
Total	4	4	3	11

Multiple medalists
Name	Sport	1st place, gold medalist(s)	2nd place, silver medalist(s)	3rd place, bronze medalist(s)	Total
Sarah Sjöström	Swimming	2	0	0	2
Truls Möregårdh	Table tennis	0	2	0	2

== Competitors ==
The following is the list of number of competitors in the Games.

Sport	Men	Women	Total
Athletics	12	9	21
Boxing	1	1	2
Canoeing	2	3	5
Cycling	1	2	3
Diving	0	1	1
Equestrian	4	5	9
Golf	2	2	4
Handball	14	14	28
Judo	1	1	2
Modern pentathlon	0	1	1
Sailing	2	6	8
Shooting	5	2	7
Skateboarding	1	0	1
Swimming	5	7	12
Table tennis	3	3	6
Triathlon	0	1	1
Volleyball	2	0	2
Wrestling	0	2	2
Total	55	60	115

The competitor count includes reserves in handball who were called up and played games. It does not include Andreas Almgren as he did not start any events due to injury, nor does it include Elias Persson who was present as a reserve in swimming but didn't participate in any events.

== Athletics ==
Swedish track and field athletes achieved the entry standards for Paris 2024, either by passing the direct qualifying mark (or time for track and road races) or by world ranking, in the following events (a maximum of 3 athletes each):

Key

- Note–Ranks given for track events are within the athlete's heat only
- Q = Qualified for the next round
- q = Qualified for the next round as a fastest loser or, in field events, by position without achieving the qualifying target
- NR = National record
- N/A = Round not applicable for the event
- Bye = Athlete not required to compete in round

Track and road events
Men

Athlete	Event	Heat		Repechage		Semifinal		Final	
Athlete	Event	Result	Rank	Result	Rank	Result	Rank	Result	Rank
Henrik Larsson	100 m	10.24	40	—N/a		Did not advance			
Erik Erlandsson	200 m	20.65	31 R	20.49	5 Q	20.93	23	Did not advance	
Andreas Kramer	800 m	1:44.93	4 Q	Bye		1:46.52	23	Did not advance	
Samuel Pihlström	1500 m	3:36.80	21 R	3:33.58	4	Did not advance			
Andreas Almgren	5000 m	Did not start							
Carl Bengtström	400 m hurdles	49.34	4 R	48.63	1 Q	49.56	19	Did not advance	
Oskar Edlund	400 m hurdles	49.74	7 R	48.99	9	Did not advance			
Suldan Hassan	Marathon	—N/a						2:11:21	28
Perseus Karlström	20 km walk	—N/a						1:21:05	21

Women

Athlete	Event	Heat		Repechage		Semifinal		Final	
Athlete	Event	Result	Rank	Result	Rank	Result	Rank	Result	Rank
Julia Henriksson	100 m	11.26	27	—N/a		Did not advance			
Julia Henriksson	200 m	22.79 NR	16 Q	Bye		22.88	21	Did not advance	
Nora Lindahl	200 m	23.33	35 R	23.51	21	Did not advance			
Carolina Wikström	Marathon	—N/a						2:34:20	52

Field events
Men

Athlete	Event	Qualification		Final	
Athlete	Event	Distance	Position	Distance	Position
Armand Duplantis	Pole vault	5.75	=1 Q	6.25 WR	1st place, gold medalist(s)
Thobias Montler	Long jump	7.82	16	Did not advance	
Daniel Ståhl	Discus throw	65.16	8 q	66.95	7
Ragnar Carlsson	Hammer throw	73.96	15	Did not advance	

Women

Athlete	Event	Qualification		Final	
Athlete	Event	Distance	Position	Distance	Position
Maja Åskag	Triple jump	13.79	19	Did not advance	
Axelina Johansson	Shot put	18.16	12 q	18.03	10
Fanny Roos	Shot put	18.17	10 q	18.78	7
Vanessa Kamga	Discus throw	65.14 NR	4 Q	65.05	5
Caisa-Marie Lindfors	Discus throw	59.29	27	Did not advance	
Thea Löfman	Hammer throw	69.12	18	Did not advance	

== Boxing ==
Sweden entered two boxers into the Olympic tournament. Nebil Ibrahim scored an outright quarterfinal victory to secure a spot in the men's featherweight division at the 2023 European Games in Nowy Targ, Poland. Agnes Alexiusson (women's lightweight) secured her spot following the triumph in quota bouts round, at the 2024 World Olympic Qualification Tournament 2 in Bangkok, Thailand.

Athlete	Event	Round of 32	Round of 16	Quarterfinals	Semifinals	Final	
Athlete	Event	Opposition Result	Opposition Result	Opposition Result	Opposition Result	Opposition Result	Rank
Nebil Ibrahim	Men's 57 kg	Abusal (PLE); W 5–0	Khalokov (UZB); L 0–5	Did not advance			9
Agnes Alexiusson	Women's 60 kg	Palacios Espinoza (ECU); L 1–4	Did not advance				17

== Canoeing ==
=== Slalom ===
Sweden entered one boat into the slalom competition, for the Games through the 2023 ICF Canoe Slalom World Championships in London, Great Britain.

Athlete	Event	Preliminary						Semifinal		Final	
Athlete	Event	Run 1	Rank	Run 2	Rank	Best	Rank	Time	Rank	Time	Rank
Isak Öhrström	Men's K-1	89.43	13	135.55	21	89.43	15 Q	94.69	9 Q	147.39	12

Kayak cross

Athlete	Event	Time trial		Round 1	Repechage	Heats	Quarterfinal	Semifinal	Final	
Athlete	Event	Time	Rank	Position	Position	Position	Position	Position	Position	Rank
Isak Öhrström	Men's KX-1	70.29	16	2 Q	Bye	4	Did not advance			28

=== Sprint ===
Swedish canoeists qualified three boats in each of the following distances for the Games through the 2023 ICF Canoe Sprint World Championships in Duisburg, Germany.

Athlete	Event	Heats		Quarterfinals		Semifinals		Final	
Athlete	Event	Time	Rank	Time	Rank	Time	Rank	Time	Rank
Martin Nathell	Men's K-1 1000 m	3:28.36	2 SF	Bye		3:30.14	4 FA	3:31.06	7
Melina Andersson	Women's K-1 500 m	1:51.84	3 QF	1:49.21	1 Q	1:50.79	4 FB	1:52.65	12
Linnea Stensils	Women's K-1 500 m	1:50.16	1 SF	Bye		1:50.75	3 FB	1:52.59	11
Linnea Stensils; Moa Wikberg	Women's K-2 500 m	1:40.97	2 SF	Bye		1:40.06	5 FB	1:42.05	9

Qualification Legend: FA = Qualify to final (medal); FB = Qualify to final B (non-medal)

== Cycling ==
=== Road ===
Sweden entered one male and one female rider to compete in the road race events at the Olympic, after secured those quota through the UCI Nation Ranking and 2023 World Championships in Glasgow, Great Britain.

Athlete	Event	Time	Rank
Jakob Söderqvist	Men's road race	6:33:56	58
Caroline Andersson	Women's road race	4:02:57	14

=== Mountain biking ===
Swedish mountain bikers secured two quota places (one per gender) for the Olympic through the 2023 UCI Mountain Bike World Championships in Glasgow, Great Britain; and through the release of the final Olympic mountain biking rankings.

Athlete	Event	Time	Rank
Jenny Rissveds	Women's cross-country	1:29:04	3rd place, bronze medalist(s)

== Diving ==
Sweden secured a quota in the women's springboard event, by virtue of her top twelve result at the 2023 World Championships in Fukuoka, Japan.

Athlete	Event	Preliminary		Semifinal		Final	
Athlete	Event	Points	Rank	Points	Rank	Points	Rank
Emilia Nilsson Garip	Women's 3 m springboard	295.20	10 Q	279.60	11 Q	279.40	9

== Equestrian ==
Sweden entered a full squad of equestrian riders each to the team dressage, eventing, and jumping competitions through a top-seven finish in dressage and top-five in jumping the 2022 FEI World Championships in Herning, Denmark, and through a top-six finish at the Eventing Worlds on the same year in Pratoni del Vivaro, Italy.

=== Dressage ===
Athlete	Horse	Event	Grand Prix		Grand Prix Special		Grand Prix Freestyle		Overall	
Athlete	Horse	Event	Score	Rank	Score	Rank	Technical	Artistic	Score	Rank
Patrik Kittel	Touchdown	Individual	74.317	13 Q	—N/a		75.107	86.600	80.854	14
Therese Nilshagen	Dante Weltino OLD	Individual	73.991	15 q	—N/a		69.714	79.714	74.714	18
Juliette Ramel	Buriel K.H.	Individual	71.553	25	—N/a		Did not advance		71.553	25
Patrik Kittel; Therese Nilshagen; Juliette Ramel	See above	Team	219.861	5 Q	212.811	7	—N/a		212.811	7

Qualification Legend: Q = Qualified for the final based on position in group; q = Qualified for the final based on overall position

Reserve is Maria von Essen with Invoice.

=== Eventing ===
Athlete	Horse	Event	Dressage		Cross-country			Jumping						Total	
Athlete	Horse	Event	Dressage		Cross-country			Qualifier			Final			Total	
Athlete	Horse	Event	Penalties	Rank	Penalties	Total	Rank	Penalties	Total	Rank	Penalties	Total	Rank	Penalties	Rank
Frida Andersén	Box Leo	Individual	33.30	T33	0.00	33.30	20	0.00	33.30	13 Q	0.00	33.30	12	33.30	12
Louise Romeike	Caspian 15	Individual	37.70	T51	0.80	38.50	25	5.60	44.10	24 Q	0.40	44.50	24	44.50	24
Sofia Sjöborg	Bryjamolga vh Marienshof Z	Individual	33.30	T33	15.00	48.30	37	4.80	53.10	33	Did not advance			53.10	33
Frida Andersén; Louise Romeike; Sofia Sjöborg	See above	Team	104.30	13	15.80	120.10	7	10.40	130.50	6	—N/a			130.50	6

Reserve is Malin Asai with Golden Midnight.

=== Jumping ===
Athlete	Horse	Event	Qualification			Final			Jump-off		
Athlete	Horse	Event	Penalties	Time	Rank	Penalties	Time	Rank	Penalties	Time	Rank
Rolf-Göran Bengtsson	Zuccero HV	Individual	4	75.15	32	Did not advance					
Henrik von Eckermann	King Edward	Individual	0	74.50	7 Q	Eliminated					
Peder Fredricson	Catch Me Not S	Individual	8	74.50	43	Did not advance					
Rolf-Göran Bengtsson; Henrik von Eckermann; Peder Fredricson	See above	Team	17	237.93	8 Q	12	229.76	6	Did not advance		

Reserve is Malin Baryard-Johnsson with Indiana.

== Golf ==
Sweden entered four golfers into the Olympic tournament. Ludvig Åberg, Alex Norén, Maja Stark, and Linn Grant; all qualified directly for the games in the individual competitions, based on their world ranking performance, on the IGF World Rankings.

Athlete	Event	Round 1	Round 2	Round 3	Round 4	Total		
Athlete	Event	Score	Score	Score	Score	Score	Par	Rank
Alex Norén	Men's	67	74	71	73	285	+1	T45
Ludvig Åberg	Men's	68	70	66	72	276	−8	T18
Maja Stark	Women's	72	72	71	69	284	−4	T10
Linn Grant	Women's	74	71	73	71	289	+1	T27

== Handball ==
Summary

Key:

- ET: After extra time
- P – Match decided by penalty-shootout.

Team	Event	Group stage						Quarterfinal	Semifinal	Bronze medal match	
Team	Event	Opposition Score	Opposition Score	Opposition Score	Opposition Score	Opposition Score	Rank	Opposition Score	Opposition Score	Opposition Score	Rank
Sweden men's	Men's tournament	Germany; L 27–30	Spain; W 29–26	Slovenia; L 24–29	Croatia; W 38–27	Japan; W 40–27	4 Q	Denmark; L 31–32	Did not advance		7
Sweden women's	Women's tournament	Norway; W 32–28	Germany; W 31–28	Denmark; L 23–25	South Korea; W 27–21	Slovenia; W 27–23	2 Q	Hungary; W 36–32^{ET}	France; L 28–31^{ET}	Denmark; L 25–30	4

=== Men's tournament ===
Sweden men's national handball team qualified for the Olympics by winning the bronze medal at the 2024 European Men's Handball Championship.

Team roster

A 17-player roster was announced on 10 June 2024. On 21 June, Felix Möller replaced Andreas Nilsson who had to withdraw. The final roster was revealed on 24 July. On 28 July, Felix Möller replaced Max Darj due to an injury and on 1 August, Jonathan Edvardsson replaced Daniel Pettersson.

Head coach: (Norway) Glenn Solberg

No.	Pos.	Name	Date of birth (age)	Height	App.	Goals	Club
2	LB	Jonathan Carlsbogård	19 April 1995 (aged 29)	1.95 m	69	134	(Spain) Barça
5	P	Max Darj	27 September 1991 (aged 32)	1.92 m	121	145	(Germany) Füchse Berlin
6	P	Felix Möller	4 September 2002 (aged 21)	1.96 m	15	10	(Denmark) Aalborg Håndbold
11	RW	Daniel Pettersson	6 May 1992 (aged 32)	1.79 m	90	207	(Germany) SC Magdeburg
12	GK	Andreas Palicka	10 July 1986 (aged 38)	1.89 m	158	16	(France) Paris Saint-Germain
13	RW	Sebastian Karlsson	21 January 1995 (aged 29)	1.78 m	15	41	(France) Montpellier Handball
15	LW	Hampus Wanne	10 December 1993 (aged 30)	1.85 m	96	393	(Spain) Barça
16	GK	Tobias Thulin	5 July 1995 (aged 29)	1.98 m	60	0	(Hungary) SC Pick Szeged
19	CB	Felix Claar	5 January 1997 (aged 27)	1.93 m	74	196	(Germany) SC Magdeburg
22	LW	Lucas Pellas	28 August 1995 (aged 28)	1.83 m	71	226	(France) Montpellier Handball
23	RB	Albin Lagergren	11 September 1992 (aged 31)	1.86 m	110	324	(Germany) SC Magdeburg
24	CB	Jim Gottfridsson	2 September 1992 (aged 31)	1.91 m	155	495	(Germany) SG Flensburg-Handewitt
28	CB	Jonathan Edvardsson	7 April 1997 (aged 27)	1.90 m	22	8	(Germany) TSV Hannover-Burgdorf
32	P	Oscar Bergendahl	8 March 1995 (aged 29)	1.92 m	56	84	(Germany) SC Magdeburg
33	RB	Lukas Sandell	3 February 1997 (aged 27)	1.93 m	58	140	(Hungary) Telekom Veszprém
49	LB	Karl Wallinius	14 January 1999 (aged 25)	1.99 m	29	29	(Germany) THW Kiel

Group play

Pos	Team	Pld	W	D	L	GF	GA	GD	Pts	Qualification
1	Germany	5	4	0	1	162	144	+18	8	Quarterfinals
2	Slovenia	5	3	0	2	140	142	−2	6 (Note: Slovenia 2 Pts, +2 GD; Spain 2 Pts, 0 GD; Sweden 2 Pts, −2 GD.)	Quarterfinals
3	Spain	5	3	0	2	151	148	+3	6	Quarterfinals
4	Sweden	5	3	0	2	158	139	+19	6	Quarterfinals
5	Croatia	5	2	0	3	148	156	−8	4	
6	Japan	5	0	0	5	143	173	−30	0	

Source: Olympics Paris 2024 rankings
Rules for classification: 1) Points; 2) Head-to-head points; 3) Head-to-head goal difference; 4) Head-to-head goals scored; 5) Goal difference; 6) Goals scored; 7) Draw.
Notes:

27 July 2024; 19:00	Germany	30–27	Sweden	Paris Expo Porte de Versailles, Paris; Attendance: 5,739; Referees: Hansen, Madsen (DEN)
27 July 2024; 19:00	Uščins 8	(12–11)	Wanne 8	Paris Expo Porte de Versailles, Paris; Attendance: 5,739; Referees: Hansen, Madsen (DEN)
27 July 2024; 19:00	1× (suspension) 1× (red card)	Report	2× (suspension)	Paris Expo Porte de Versailles, Paris; Attendance: 5,739; Referees: Hansen, Madsen (DEN)

29 July 2024; 16:00	Sweden	29–26	Spain	Paris Expo Porte de Versailles, Paris; Attendance: 5,764; Referees: Horáček, Novotný (CZE)
29 July 2024; 16:00	three players 5	(11–11)	Fernández 7	Paris Expo Porte de Versailles, Paris; Attendance: 5,764; Referees: Horáček, Novotný (CZE)
29 July 2024; 16:00	1× (yellow card) 4× (suspension)	Report	1× (yellow card) 5× (suspension)	Paris Expo Porte de Versailles, Paris; Attendance: 5,764; Referees: Horáček, Novotný (CZE)

31 July 2024; 16:00	Slovenia	29–24	Sweden	Paris Expo Porte de Versailles, Paris; Attendance: 5,813; Referees: Brunner, Salah (SUI)
31 July 2024; 16:00	Janc 10	(15–14)	Wanne 6	Paris Expo Porte de Versailles, Paris; Attendance: 5,813; Referees: Brunner, Salah (SUI)
31 July 2024; 16:00	1× (yellow card) 4× (suspension) 1× (red card)	Report	1× (yellow card) 3× (suspension) 1×	Paris Expo Porte de Versailles, Paris; Attendance: 5,813; Referees: Brunner, Salah (SUI)

2 August 2024; 14:00	Croatia	27–38	Sweden	Paris Expo Porte de Versailles, Paris; Attendance: 5,774; Referees: C. Bonaventura, J. Bonaventura (FRA)
2 August 2024; 14:00	Martinović 8	(15–18)	Pellas 9	Paris Expo Porte de Versailles, Paris; Attendance: 5,774; Referees: C. Bonaventura, J. Bonaventura (FRA)
2 August 2024; 14:00	1× (yellow card) 4× (suspension)	Report	3× (suspension)	Paris Expo Porte de Versailles, Paris; Attendance: 5,774; Referees: C. Bonaventura, J. Bonaventura (FRA)

4 August 2024; 09:00	Sweden	40–27	Japan	Paris Expo Porte de Versailles, Paris; Attendance: 5,808; Referees: Schulze, Tönnies (GER)
4 August 2024; 09:00	Karlsson 6	(16–9)	Sugioka 9	Paris Expo Porte de Versailles, Paris; Attendance: 5,808; Referees: Schulze, Tönnies (GER)
4 August 2024; 09:00	2× (suspension)	Report	2× (suspension)	Paris Expo Porte de Versailles, Paris; Attendance: 5,808; Referees: Schulze, Tönnies (GER)

Quarterfinal

7 August 2024; 17:30	Denmark	32–31	Sweden	Stade Pierre-Mauroy, Lille; Attendance: 26,449; Referees: C. Bonaventura, J. Bonaventura (FRA)
7 August 2024; 17:30	Pytlick 9	(16–16)	Claar 7	Stade Pierre-Mauroy, Lille; Attendance: 26,449; Referees: C. Bonaventura, J. Bonaventura (FRA)
7 August 2024; 17:30	2× (yellow card) 3× (suspension)	Report	1× (yellow card) 4× (suspension)	Stade Pierre-Mauroy, Lille; Attendance: 26,449; Referees: C. Bonaventura, J. Bonaventura (FRA)

=== Women's tournament ===
Sweden women's national handball team qualified for the Olympics by securing a top two spot at the 2024 IHF Women's Olympic Qualification Tournaments in Debrecen, Hungary.

Team roster

The squad was announced on 4 June 2024. On 26 July, Olivia Löfqvist replaced Sofia Hvenfelt due to an injury.

Head coach: Tomas Axnér

No.	Pos.	Name	Date of birth (age)	Height	App.	Goals	Club
1	GK	Johanna Bundsen	3 June 1991 (aged 33)	1.85 m	146	4	(Germany) HB Ludwigsburg
3	RB	Nina Koppang	31 May 2002 (aged 22)	1.78 m	30	41	(Norway) Vipers Kristiansand
6	CB	Carin Strömberg	10 July 1993 (aged 31)	1.84 m	147	221	(France) Neptunes de Nantes
7	P	Linn Blohm	20 May 1992 (aged 32)	1.80 m	167	490	(Hungary) Győri ETO KC
8	LB	Jamina Roberts	28 May 1990 (aged 34)	1.76 m	234	604	(Norway) Vipers Kristiansand
10	RW	Mathilda Lundström	20 December 1996 (aged 27)	1.65 m	80	124	(Denmark) HH Elite
21	GK	Evelina Eriksson	20 August 1996 (aged 27)	1.84 m	33	1	(Romania) CSM București
23	CB	Emma Lindqvist	17 September 1997 (aged 26)	1.77 m	89	182	(Denmark) Ikast Håndbold
24	RW	Nathalie Hagman	19 July 1991 (aged 33)	1.67 m	222	820	(Romania) SCM Râmnicu Vâlcea
29	LB	Kristin Thorleifsdóttir	13 January 1998 (aged 26)	1.82 m	61	87	(Hungary) Debreceni VSC
35	P	Sofia Hvenfelt	23 April 1996 (aged 28)	1.80 m	29	36	(Germany) HB Ludwigsburg
38	LW	Elin Hansson	7 August 1996 (aged 27)	1.73 m	75	188	(Denmark) Team Esbjerg
42	CB	Jenny Carlson	17 April 1995 (aged 29)	1.72 m	62	175	(Germany) HB Ludwigsburg
49	P	Olivia Löfqvist	13 July 1998 (aged 26)	1.77 m	10	7	(Norway) Storhamar HE
54	LB	Tyra Axnér	18 March 2002 (aged 22)	1.78 m	35	57	(France) Metz Handball

Group play

Pos	Team	Pld	W	D	L	GF	GA	GD	Pts	Qualification
1	Norway	5	4	0	1	140	110	+30	8 (Note: Norway 2 Pts, +5 GD; Sweden 2 Pts, +2 GD; Denmark 2 Pts, −7 GD.)	Quarterfinals
2	Sweden	5	4	0	1	140	125	+15	8	Quarterfinals
3	Denmark	5	4	0	1	126	116	+10	8	Quarterfinals
4	Germany	5	1	0	4	136	134	+2	2 (Note: Germany 2 Pts, +18 GD; South Korea 2 Pts, −6 GD; Slovenia 2 Pts, −12 GD.)	Quarterfinals
5	South Korea	5	1	0	4	107	133	−26	2	
6	Slovenia	5	1	0	4	116	147	−31	2	

Source: Olympics Paris 2024 rankings
Rules for classification: 1) Points; 2) Head-to-head points; 3) Head-to-head goal difference; 4) Head-to-head goals scored; 5) Goal difference; 6) Goals scored; 7) Draw.
Notes:

25 July 2024; 21:00	Norway	28–32	Sweden	Paris Expo Porte de Versailles, Paris; Attendance: 5,808; Referees: García, Marín (ESP)
25 July 2024; 21:00	Mørk, Oftedal 7	(17–15)	Hagman 8	Paris Expo Porte de Versailles, Paris; Attendance: 5,808; Referees: García, Marín (ESP)
25 July 2024; 21:00	1× (yellow card) 3× (suspension)	Report	1× (yellow card) 5× (suspension) 1× (red card)	Paris Expo Porte de Versailles, Paris; Attendance: 5,808; Referees: García, Marín (ESP)

28 July 2024; 14:00	Sweden	31–28	Germany	Paris Expo Porte de Versailles, Paris; Attendance: 5,815; Referees: Pavićević, Ražnatović (MNE)
28 July 2024; 14:00	Carlson 7	(19–12)	three players 5	Paris Expo Porte de Versailles, Paris; Attendance: 5,815; Referees: Pavićević, Ražnatović (MNE)
28 July 2024; 14:00	4× (suspension)	Report	3× (suspension)	Paris Expo Porte de Versailles, Paris; Attendance: 5,815; Referees: Pavićević, Ražnatović (MNE)

30 July 2024; 21:00	Sweden	23–25	Denmark	Paris Expo Porte de Versailles, Paris; Attendance: 5,724; Referees: A. Konjičanin, D. Konjičanin (BIH)
30 July 2024; 21:00	Hagman 6	(14–14)	four players 4	Paris Expo Porte de Versailles, Paris; Attendance: 5,724; Referees: A. Konjičanin, D. Konjičanin (BIH)
30 July 2024; 21:00	4× (suspension)	Report	1× (yellow card) 3× (suspension)	Paris Expo Porte de Versailles, Paris; Attendance: 5,724; Referees: A. Konjičanin, D. Konjičanin (BIH)

1 August 2024; 11:00	South Korea	21–27	Sweden	Paris Expo Porte de Versailles, Paris; Attendance: 5,653; Referees: García, Paolantoni (ARG)
1 August 2024; 11:00	Kang K. 5	(11–16)	Lindqvist 5	Paris Expo Porte de Versailles, Paris; Attendance: 5,653; Referees: García, Paolantoni (ARG)
1 August 2024; 11:00	2× (suspension)	Report		Paris Expo Porte de Versailles, Paris; Attendance: 5,653; Referees: García, Paolantoni (ARG)

3 August 2024; 16:00	Slovenia	23–27	Sweden	Paris Expo Porte de Versailles, Paris; Attendance: 5,801; Referees: Brunner, Salah (SUI)
3 August 2024; 16:00	Omoregie 9	(14–11)	Hagman 5	Paris Expo Porte de Versailles, Paris; Attendance: 5,801; Referees: Brunner, Salah (SUI)
3 August 2024; 16:00	2× (suspension)	Report	1× (suspension)	Paris Expo Porte de Versailles, Paris; Attendance: 5,801; Referees: Brunner, Salah (SUI)

Quarterfinal

6 August 2024
17:30
Hungary
32–36 (ET)
Sweden
Stade Pierre-Mauroy, Lille
Attendance: 22,408
Referees: A. Konjičanin, D. Konjičanin (BIH)
Klujber 11
(15–16)
Koppang 7
1× (yellow card) 3× (suspension)
Report
4× (suspension)

FT: 29–29 ET: 3–7

Semifinal

8 August 2024
16:30
Sweden
28–31 (ET)
France
Stade Pierre-Mauroy, Lille
Attendance: 24,688
Referees: Kuttler, Merz (GER)
Hagman 6
(12–10)
Horacek 8
3× (suspension)
Report
1× (yellow card) 5× (suspension)

FT: 25–25 ET: 3–6

Bronze medal game

10 August 2024; 10:00	Denmark	30–25	Sweden	Stade Pierre-Mauroy, Lille; Attendance: 13,179; Referees: Jørum, Kleven (NOR)
10 August 2024; 10:00	Højlund 5	(15–13)	Hagman 5	Stade Pierre-Mauroy, Lille; Attendance: 13,179; Referees: Jørum, Kleven (NOR)
10 August 2024; 10:00	1× (yellow card) 4× (suspension)	Report	1× (yellow card) 3× (suspension)	Stade Pierre-Mauroy, Lille; Attendance: 13,179; Referees: Jørum, Kleven (NOR)

== Judo ==
Sweden qualified two judokas for the following weight classes at the Games. Marcus Nyman (men's middleweight, 90 kg) and Tara Babulfath (women's extra-lightweight, 48 kg) got qualified via quota based on IJF World Ranking List and continental quota based on Olympic point rankings.

With her 3rd place in women's 48 kg, Tara Babulfath won Sweden's first ever Olympic medal in judo.

Athlete	Event	Round of 32	Round of 16	Quarterfinals	Semifinals	Repechage	Final / BM	
Athlete	Event	Opposition Result	Opposition Result	Opposition Result	Opposition Result	Opposition Result	Opposition Result	Rank
Marcus Nyman	Men's –90 kg	Trippel (GER); W 01–00	Grigorian (UAE); L 00–10	Did not advance				9
Tara Babulfath	Women's –48 kg	Lee H-k (KOR); W 10–00	Kurbonova (UZB); W 10–00	Scutto (ITA); W 10–00	Tsunoda (JPN); L 00–10	Bye	Abuzhakynova (KAZ); W 10–00	3rd place, bronze medalist(s)

== Modern pentathlon ==
Swedish modern pentathlete confirmed one quota place for the Olympic games. Marlena Jawaid secured her spot in the women's event, through the release of the final Olympic ranking.

Athlete	Event		Fencing (épée one touch)				Riding (show jumping)			Swimming (200 m freestyle)			Combined: shooting/running (10 m laser pistol)/(3000 m)			Total points	Final rank
Athlete	Event		RR	BR	Rank	MP points	Penalties	Rank	MP points	Time	Rank	MP points	Time	Rank	MP points	Total points	Final rank
Marlena Jawaid	Women's	Semifinal	18–17	0	10	215	10	11	290	2:20.65	13	269	12:09.81	13	571	1345	12
Marlena Jawaid	Women's	Final	18–17	Did not advance													

== Sailing ==
Swedish sailors qualified one boat in each of the following classes through the 2023 Sailing World Championships, the class-associated Worlds, and the continental regattas.

Elimination events

Athlete	Event	Opening rounds																Quarterfinal	Semifinal	Final	Final rank
Athlete	Event	1	2	3	4	5	6	7	8	9	10	11	12	13	14	Net points	Rank	Quarterfinal	Semifinal	Final	Final rank
Johanna Hjertberg	Women's IQFoil	19	17	6	20	23	~~24~~	~~DNS~~	6	10	20	17	17	18	6	177	20	Did not advance			20

Medal race events

Athlete	Event	Race													Net points	Final rank
Athlete	Event	1	2	3	4	5	6	7	8	9	10	11	12	M*	Net points	Final rank
Josefin Olsson	Women's ILCA 6	~~36~~	23	28	9	12	1	5	19	31	—N/a			DNA	128	17
Vilma Bobeck; Rebecca Netzler	Women's 49erFX	14	6	15	4	15	10	2	1	5	1	1	~~18~~	2	76	2nd place, silver medalist(s)
Anton Dahlberg; Lovisa Karlsson	Mixed 470	7	~~14~~	1	2	1	13	11	4	—N/a				8	47	3rd place, bronze medalist(s)
Hanna Jonsson; Emil Järudd	Mixed Nacra 17	13	18	10	8	9	14	8	9	17	7	6	9	12	118	10

M = Medal race; EL = Eliminated – did not advance into the medal race

== Shooting ==
Swedish shooters achieved quota places for the following events based on their results at the 2022 and 2023 ISSF World Championships, 2022, 2023, and 2024 European Championships, 2023 European Games, and 2024 ISSF World Olympic Qualification Tournament.

Athlete	Event	Qualification		Final	
Athlete	Event	Points	Rank	Points	Rank
Rickard Levin Andersson	Men's trap	123	4 Q	30	4
Victor Lindgren	Men's 10 m air rifle	630.7	6 Q	251.4	2nd place, silver medalist(s)
Victor Lindgren	Men's 50 m rifle 3 positions	589	13	Did not advance	
Marcus Madsen	Men's 10 m air rifle	625.0	40	Did not advance	
Marcus Madsen	Men's 50 m rifle 3 positions	589	12	Did not advance	
Stefan Nilsson	Men's skeet	122	5 Q	27	5
Marcus Svensson	Men's skeet	118	18	Did not advance	
Victoria Larsson	Women's skeet	118	11	Did not advance	
Stina Lawner	Women's 25 m pistol	573	30	Did not advance	
Victoria Larsson; Marcus Svensson	Mixed skeet team	136	15	Did not advance	

== Skateboarding ==
Sweden entered one male skateboarder to compete in the following event at the Games.

Athlete	Event	Qualification		Final	
Athlete	Event	Score	Rank	Score	Rank
Hampus Winberg	Men's park	88.29	9	Did not advance	

== Swimming ==
Swedish swimmers achieved the entry standards in the following events for Paris 2024 (a maximum of two swimmers under the Olympic Qualifying Time (OST) and potentially at the Olympic Consideration Time (OCT)): Isak Eliasson and Robin Hanson were selected for the men's relay events while Sara Junevik, Hanna Rosvall, Sofia Åstedt were selected for the women's relay events. Elias Persson was also selected for the relay events, but did not end up competing.

Men

Athlete	Event	Heat		Semifinal		Final	
Athlete	Event	Time	Rank	Time	Rank	Time	Rank
Björn Seeliger	50 m freestyle	22.21	31	Did not advance			
Björn Seeliger	100 m freestyle	49.70	40	Did not advance			
Victor Johansson	400 m freestyle	3:47.98	18	—N/a		Did not advance	
Victor Johansson	800 m freestyle	7:49.47	16	—N/a		Did not advance	
Victor Johansson	1500 m freestyle	15:05.62	17	—N/a		Did not advance	
Victor Johansson	10 km open water	—N/a				Did not start	
Erik Persson	200 m breaststroke	2:10.35	=7 Q	2:10.11	13	Did not advance	
Isak Eliasson; Robin Hanson; Elias Persson; Björn Seeliger	4 × 100 m freestyle relay	3:15.71	15	—N/a		Did not advance	

Women

Athlete	Event	Heat		Semifinal		Final	
Athlete	Event	Time	Rank	Time	Rank	Time	Rank
Michelle Coleman	50 m freestyle	24.55	7 Q	24.47	9	Did not advance	
Michelle Coleman	100 m freestyle	54.10	14 Q	53.75	12	Did not advance	
Louise Hansson	100 m backstroke	1:00.26	15 Q	1:00.47	15	Did not advance	
Louise Hansson	100 m butterfly	57.57	12 Q	56.93	8 Q	57.34	8
Sophie Hansson	100 m breaststroke	1:06.66	13 Q	1:06.96	13	Did not advance	
Sophie Hansson	200 m breaststroke	2:28.10	20	Did not advance			
Sarah Sjöström	50 m freestyle	23.85	1 Q	23.66 OR	1 Q	23.71	1st place, gold medalist(s)
Sarah Sjöström	100 m freestyle	52.99	1 Q	52.87	6 Q	52.16	1st place, gold medalist(s)
Michelle Coleman; Louise Hansson; Sara Junevik; Sarah Sjöström; Sofia Åstedt^{[a]}	4 × 100 m freestyle relay	3:34.35	4 Q	—N/a		3:33.79 NR	5
Hanna Rosvall; Sophie Hansson; Louise Hansson; Sarah Sjöström	4 × 100 m medley relay	3:57.33	6 Q	—N/a		3:56.92	7

Mixed

Athlete	Event	Heat		Final	
Athlete	Event	Time	Rank	Time	Rank
Hanna Rosvall; Erik Persson; Sara Junevik; Robin Hanson	4 × 100 m medley relay	3:46.15	12	Did not advance	

^{a} Swimmers who participated in the heats only.

== Table tennis ==
Sweden entered a full squad of to the men's team competition following the triumph of winning the 2023 European Team Championships in Malmö. Sweden also qualified a women's team through the ITTF World Rankings; and mixed doubles team through the 2024 ITTF World Qualification Tournament in Havířov, Czech Republic.

Men

Athlete	Event	Round 1	Round 2	Round 3	Round of 16	Quarterfinals	Semifinals	Final	
Athlete	Event	Opposition Result	Opposition Result	Opposition Result	Opposition Result	Opposition Result	Opposition Result	Opposition Result	Rank
Anton Källberg	Singles	Bye	Idowu (CGO); W 4–3	Lebrun (FRA); L 2–4	Did not advance				17
Truls Möregårdh	Singles	Bye	Nuytinck (BEL); W 4–0	Wang (CHN); W 4–2	Kao (TPE); W 4–1	Assar (EGY); W 4–1	Calderano (BRA); W 4–2	Fan (CHN); L 1–4	2nd place, silver medalist(s)
Kristian Karlsson; Anton Källberg; Truls Möregårdh	Team	—N/a			Denmark; W 3–0	Germany; W 3–0	Japan; W 3–2	China; L 0–3	2nd place, silver medalist(s)

Women

Athlete	Event	Round 1	Round 2	Round 3	Round of 16	Quarterfinals	Semifinals	Final / BM	
Athlete	Event	Opposition Result	Opposition Result	Opposition Result	Opposition Result	Opposition Result	Opposition Result	Opposition Result	Rank
Linda Bergström	Singles	Bye	Wegrzyn (POL); W 4–1	Chen (CHN); L 1–4	Did not advance				17
Christina Källberg	Singles	Bye	Akula (IND); L 0–4	Did not advance					33
Filippa Bergand; Linda Bergström; Christina Källberg	Team	—N/a			Hong Kong; W 3–2	South Korea; L 0–3	Did not advance		5

Mixed

Athlete	Event	Round of 16	Quarterfinals	Semifinals	Final / BM	
Athlete	Event	Opposition Result	Opposition Result	Opposition Result	Opposition Result	Rank
Kristian Karlsson; Christina Källberg	Doubles	Campos/Fonseca (CUB); W 4–1	Ri/Kim (PRK); L 1–4	Did not advance		5

== Triathlon ==
Sweden entered one female triathlete in the triathlon events for Paris, following the release of final individual olympics qualification ranking.

Individual

Athlete	Event	Time						Rank
Athlete	Event	Swim (1.5 km)	Trans 1	Bike (40 km)	Trans 2	Run (10 km)	Total	Rank
Tilda Månsson	Women's	24:03	0:59	57:48	0:33	35:59	1:59:22	23

== Volleyball ==
=== Beach ===
Swedish men's pair qualified for Paris based on the FIVB Beach Volleyball Olympic Ranking.

Athletes	Event	Preliminary round				LL	Round of 16	Quarterfinal	Semifinal	Final / BM	
Athletes	Event	Opposition Score	Opposition Score	Opposition Score	Rank	Opposition Score	Opposition Score	Opposition Score	Opposition Score	Opposition Score	Rank
Jonatan Hellvig; David Åhman	Men's	Nicolaidis / Carracher (AUS); W (21–14, 21–19)	Cherif / Ahmed (QAT); L (21–15, 19–21, 18–20)	Cottafava / Nicolai (ITA); L (22–24, 17–21)	3 Q	Bye	Alayo / Díaz (CUB); W (21–11, 26–28, 15–11)	Evandro – Arthur (BRA); W (21–17, 21–16)	Cherif / Ahmed (QAT); W (21–13, 21–17)	Ehlers / Wickler (GER); W (21–10, 21–13)	1st place, gold medalist(s)

== Wrestling ==
Sweden qualified one wrestlers for each of the following classes into the Olympic competition. Jonna Malmgren qualified for the games by virtue of top five results through the 2023 World Championships in Belgrade, Serbia. Johanna Lindborg received a quota due to reallocations of Individual Neutral Athletes (AIN).

Key:

- VT (ranking points: 5–0 or 0–5) – Victory by fall.
- VB (ranking points: 5–0 or 0–5) – Victory by injury (VF for forfeit, VA for withdrawal or disqualification)
- PP (ranking points: 3–1 or 1–3) – Decision by points – the loser with technical points.
- PO (ranking points: 3–0 or 0–3) – Decision by points – the loser without technical points.
- ST (ranking points: 4–0 or 0–4) – Great superiority – the loser without technical points and a margin of victory of at least 8 (Greco-Roman) or 10 (freestyle) points.
- SP (ranking points: 4–1 or 1–4) – Technical superiority – the loser with technical points and a margin of victory of at least 8 (Greco-Roman) or 10 (freestyle) points.

Freestyle

Athlete	Event	Round of 16	Quarterfinal	Semifinal	Repechage	Final / BM	
Athlete	Event	Opposition Result	Opposition Result	Opposition Result	Opposition Result	Opposition Result	Rank
Jonna Malmgren	Women's −53 kg	Argüello (VEN); W 5–0^{VT}	Pang (CHN); L 1–3^{PP}	Did not advance			7
Johanna Lindborg	Women's −62 kg	Dudova (BUL); L 1–3^{PP}	Did not advance				10

== See also ==
- Sweden at the 2024 Summer Paralympics
