= Table tennis at the 2024 Summer Olympics =

Table tennis at the Games of the XXXIII Olympiad
- Venue: Paris Expo Porte de Versailles
- Dates: 27 July – 10 August 2024
- No. of events: 5 (2 men, 2 women, 1 mixed)
- Competitors: 175 from 60 nations

The table tennis tournaments at the 2024 Summer Olympics in Paris ran from 27 July to 10 August at the Paris Expo Porte de Versailles. A total of 175 table tennis players, with an equal distribution between men and women, competed across five medal events (two per gender and a mixed) at these Games, the exact same number as those in the previous editions. After a successful tournament during the 2020 Summer Olympics, the mixed doubles event remained in the table tennis program for the second time at the Olympics.

Chinese players swept all of the available events, winning five gold medals.

The 2024 Summer Olympics marked a historic milestone for table tennis, drawing over 230,000 spectators across 15 days of competition at the South Paris Arena 4. 6,500 fans per session attended Olympic table tennis.

== Qualification ==
172 table tennis quota places, with an equal split between men and women, were available for Paris 2024; NOCs could enter a maximum of six table tennis players across five medal events (men's and women's singles; men's and women's teams, and mixed doubles) with a maximum of two each for the men's and women's singles. The host nation France reserved a direct spot each in the men's and women's teams, respectively, with one per gender competing in the singles tournament; and in the mixed doubles (previously inaugurated in Tokyo 2020).

Each team event features a draw of sixteen NOCs with a trio of table tennis players. The initial half of the total quota will be awarded to the quarterfinalists at the 2024 ITTF World Teams Championships, scheduled for February 16 to 25 in Busan, South Korea, while six continental qualification tournaments (Africa, Asia, Europe, and Oceania, with the Americas divided between North and Latin for an ITTF competition) will offer the men's and women's team spot each to the top-ranked NOC from a respective continent. Apart from the host nation, the remaining slot will be attributed to the highest-ranked eligible NOC based on the ITTF World Team Ranking list of March 2024.

The mixed doubles tournament shares the same amount with the teams, consisting of sixteen NOCs with a pair of table tennis players. The initial quarter of the total quota will be awarded to the semifinalists of the designated qualifying meet, scheduled for March or April 2024, while six continental qualification tournaments (Africa, Asia, Europe, and Oceania, with the Americas divided between North and Latin for an ITTF competition) will offer the mixed doubles spot each to the top-ranked NOC from a respective continent. Apart from the host nation, the five highest-ranked eligible pairs will obtain the remaining berths to complete the field based on the ITTF World Ranking list of May 7, 2024.

About 70 table tennis players may participate in the men's and women's singles, depending on the number of slots available after the distribution of the mixed doubles quota. Each NOC can enter a maximum of four table tennis players (two per gender). Thirty-two places are reserved for each of the qualified men's and women's teams, with twenty-two more attributed to the individuals coming from NOCs without a qualified team through the continental meets organized by ITTF (four for Africa, six each for Asia and Europe, five for the Americas, and one for Oceania). A maximum of fifteen table tennis players will secure a spot through the ITTF World Singles Ranking list of June 18, 2024, respecting the four-player (two per gender) NOC limit, while the remaining men's and women's singles spots are entitled to the eligible NOCs interested to have their table tennis players compete for Paris 2024 under the Universality system.

== Participating nations ==
There were 60 participating nations:

- Algeria (2)
- Argentina (1)
- Australia (6)
- Austria (2)
- Belgium (2)
- Brazil (6)
- Cameroon (1)
- Canada (4)
- Chile (3)
- China (6)
- Croatia (4)
- Cuba (3)
- Czech Republic (1)
- Denmark (3)
- Ecuador (1)
- Egypt (7)
- Fiji (1)
- France (6) (host)
- Germany (7)
- Great Britain (2)
- Greece (1)
- Guyana (1)
- Hong Kong (4)
- Hungary (3)
- India (6)
- Iran (3)
- Italy (2)
- Japan (6)
- Jordan (1)
- Kazakhstan (1)
- Lebanon (1)
- Luxembourg (3)
- Madagascar (1)
- Maldives (1)
- Mexico (2)
- Moldova (1)
- Monaco (1)
- Nepal (1)
- Netherlands (1)
- Nigeria (4)
- North Korea (3)
- Poland (5)
- Portugal (5)
- Puerto Rico (3)
- Republic of the Congo (1)
- Romania (5)
- Senegal (1)
- Serbia (1)
- Singapore (3)
- Slovenia (3)
- Slovakia (1)
- South Korea (6)
- Spain (2)
- Sweden (6)
- Chinese Taipei (6)
- Thailand (3)
- Turkey (1)
- Ukraine (3)
- United States (4)
- Vanuatu (1)

== Competition schedule ==
Legend
P	Preliminary round	¼	Quarter-finals	½	Semi-finals	F	Final

Schedule
Event↓ / Date →	Sat 27	Sun 28	Mon 29	Tue 30	Wed 31	Thu 1	Fri 2	Sat 3	Sun 4	Mon 5	Tue 6	Wed 7	Thu 8	Fri 9	Sat 10
Men's singles	P					¼	½		F						
Men's team										P		¼	½	F	
Women's singles	P					¼	½	F							
Women's team										P		¼	½		F
Mixed doubles	P	¼	½	F											

== Medal summary ==
A total of 15 medals were won by six NOCs.

=== Medal table ===
* Host nation (France)

Rank	NOC	Gold	Silver	Bronze	Total
1	China	5	1	0	6
2	Sweden	0	2	0	2
3	Japan	0	1	1	2
4	North Korea	0	1	0	1
5	France*	0	0	2	2
5	South Korea	0	0	2	2
Totals (6 entries)		5	5	5	15

=== Medalists ===
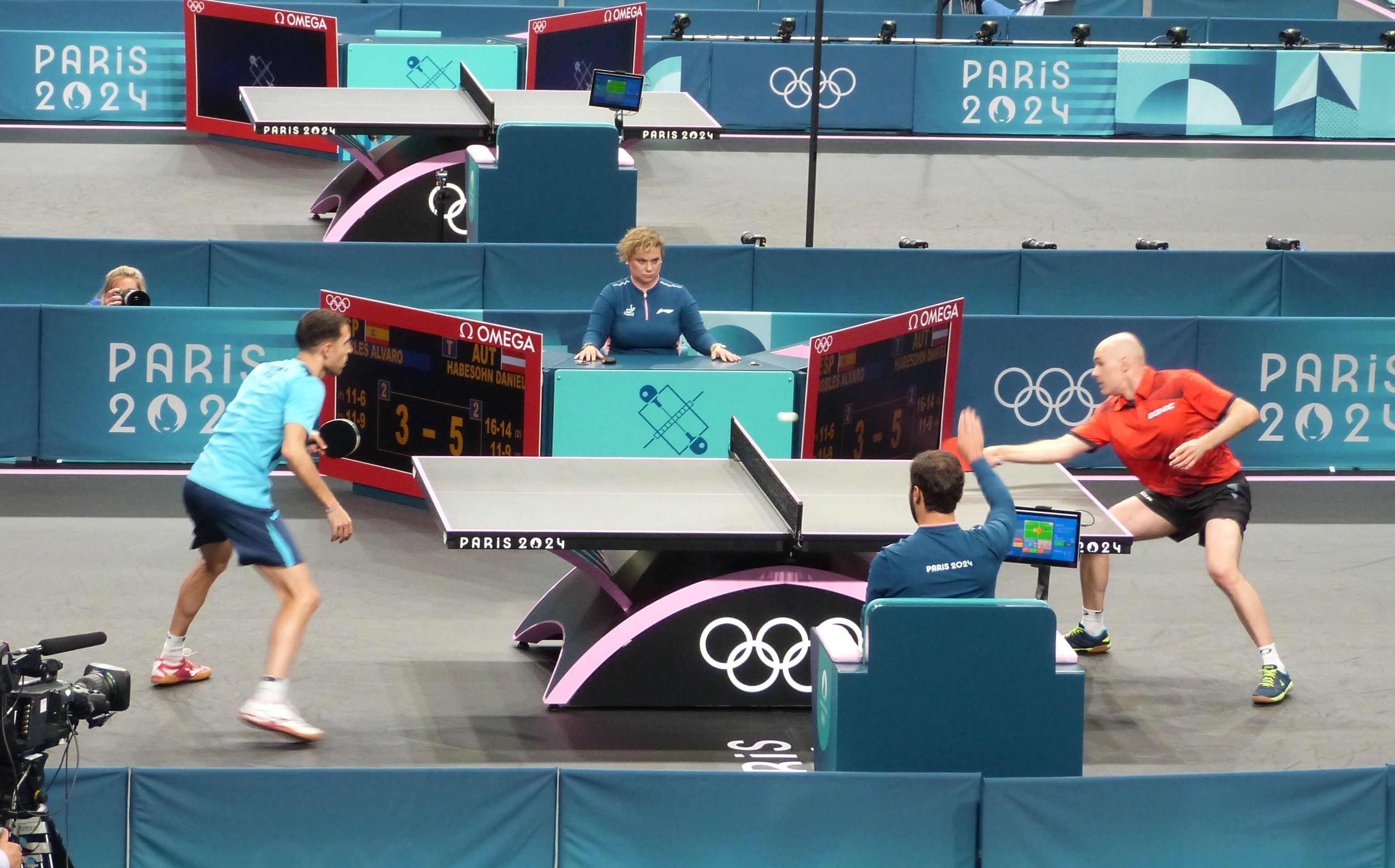
During the competition

Event	Gold	Silver	Bronze
Men's singles	Fan Zhendong; China	Truls Möregårdh; Sweden	Félix Lebrun; France
Men's team	China; Fan Zhendong; Ma Long; Wang Chuqin	Sweden; Anton Källberg; Kristian Karlsson; Truls Möregårdh	France; Simon Gauzy; Alexis Lebrun; Félix Lebrun
Women's singles	Chen Meng; China	Sun Yingsha; China	Hina Hayata; Japan
Women's team	China; Sun Yingsha; Wang Manyu; Chen Meng	Japan; Hina Hayata; Miwa Harimoto; Miu Hirano	South Korea; Shin Yu-bin; Jeon Ji-hee; Lee Eun-hye
Mixed doubles	China; Wang Chuqin; Sun Yingsha	North Korea; Ri Jong-sik; Kim Kum-yong	South Korea; Lim Jong-hoon; Shin Yu-bin

== See also ==
- Table tennis at the 2023 European Games
- Table tennis at the 2023 Pan American Games
- Table tennis at the 2024 Summer Paralympics
