= Georgios Gennimatas (athlete) =

Greek sprinter

Georgios Gennimatas (Greek: Γεώργιος Γεννηματάς, 1873 in Laconia – ??) was a Greek athlete. He competed at the 1896 Summer Olympics in Athens.

Gennimatas placed fourth or fifth (with the other place going to Henrik Sjöberg of Sweden) in his preliminary heat of the 100 metres competition and did not advance to the final.

In 1913 he served as president of Panathinaikos A.O.
