= Francis Lane =

American sprinter

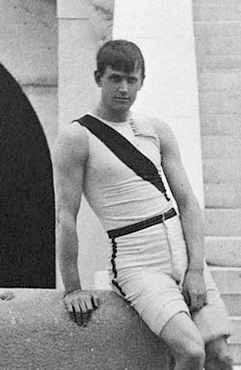
- Lane at the 1896 Olympics

Personal information
- Born: September 23, 1874 Chicago, Illinois, United States
- Died: February 17, 1927 (aged 52) Chicago, Illinois, United States
- Education: Princeton University; Washington University School of Medicine
- Height: 1.70 m (5 ft 7 in)
- Weight: 69 kg (152 lb)

Sport
- Sport: Sprint running
- Event: 100 m

Achievements and titles
- Personal best: 12.2 (1896)
Medal record
Representing United States
Olympic Games
Bronze medal – third place	1896 Athens	100 metres

Francis Adonijah Lane (September 23, 1874 – February 17, 1927) was an American sprinter who competed at the 1896 Summer Olympics in Greece.

At the time of the 1896 Summer Olympics Lane was in his junior year at Princeton University and was one of the four from the university that made up the American team of 14 competitors, the 16 day journey to Athens didn't help Lane, and he arrived in the poorest condition after suffering from sea sickness.

Lane competed in the 100 metres, and when he won his heat in 12.2 seconds, he became the first American to compete at the Olympic Games and the first ever person to win a 100-metre race. In the final, he ran 12.6 seconds and tied for the third place with Alajos Szokolyi of Hungary, and both are considered as bronze medalists. At those games the champion was honored with a silver medal, an olive branch and a diploma, and the second athlete with a bronze medal, laurel branch and a diploma. Nothing was given to the third-best man.

Lane's cousin Albert Tyler was also part of the 1896 United States Olympic team and won a silver medal in the pole vault.

Lane was a member of the Franklin High School (Ohio) Class of 1891. In 1897 Lane graduated from Princeton University and went to the medical school at Washington University in St. Louis. He later became the head of ophthalmology departments at Rush Medical College and the Presbyterian and Illinois Central Hospitals in Chicago. Lane is buried at Greenwood Cemetery in Rockford, IL.

== See also ==
- List of Princeton University Olympians
