= Sweden at the 1896 Summer Olympics =

- Flag of Sweden during union with Norway
- IOC code: SWE

in Athens, Greece April 6, 1896 – April 15, 1896
- Competitors: 1 in 2 sports and 5 events
- Medals: Gold 0 Silver 0 Bronze 0 Total 0

Summer Olympics appearances (overview)
- 1896; 1900; 1904; 1908; 1912; 1920; 1924; 1928; 1932; 1936; 1948; 1952; 1956; 1960; 1964; 1968; 1972; 1976; 1980; 1984; 1988; 1992; 1996; 2000; 2004; 2008; 2012; 2016; 2020; 2024; 2028

Other related appearances
- 1906 Intercalated Games

One competitor from Sweden was present at the 1896 Summer Olympics. He competed in athletics and gymnastics, with 5 entries in as many events. Sweden was one of four nations present that won no medals; Italy, Chile and Bulgaria were the others.

== Competitors ==
The following is the list of number of competitors in the Games.

Sport	Men	Women	Total
Athletics	1	0	1
Gymnastics	1	0	1
Total	1	0	1

== Athletics ==
The high jump was Sjöberg's most successful event, as he took 4th in it. He took either 4th or 5th in his heat in the 100 metres, needing 2nd to advance to the final. In the long jump, he placed somewhere between 5th and 9th, jumping something less than 5.74 metres. He was again somewhere between 5th and 9th in the discus throw, with a distance less than 25.20 metres.

Track & road events

Athlete	Event	Heat		Final	
Athlete	Event	Time	Rank	Time	Rank
Henrik Sjöberg	100 m	Unknown	4-5	Did not advance	

Field events

Athlete	Event	Final	
Athlete	Event	Distance	Position
Henrik Sjöberg	Men's high jump	1.60	4
Henrik Sjöberg	Men's long jump	5.80	6
Henrik Sjöberg	Men's discus throw	Unknown	5-9

== Gymnastics ==
Sjöberg did not place in the vaulting competition.

Athlete	Event	Result	Rank
Henrik Sjöberg	Vault	Unknown	4–15
