= Hronec =

Hronec Kisgaram
- Municipality
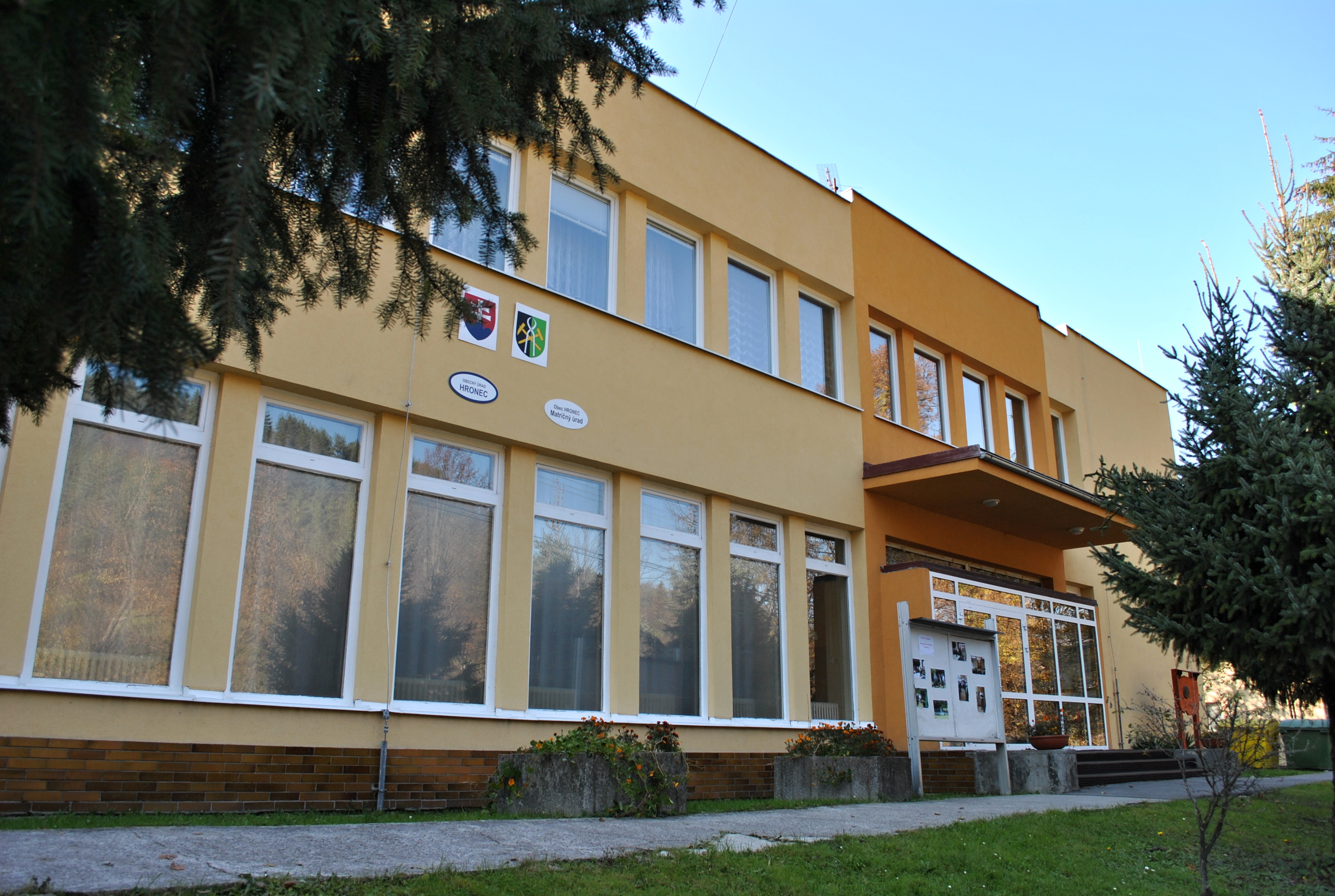
- Municipal office

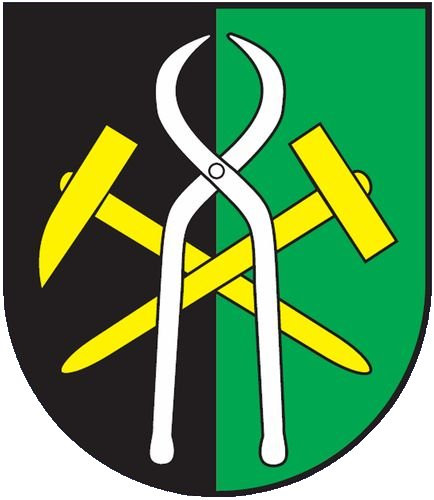
- Flag Coat of arms

- Location of Hronec in the Banská Bystrica Region Location of Hronec in Slovakia
- Coordinates: 48.78°N 19.58°E
- Country: Slovakia
- Region: Banská Bystrica Region
- District: Brezno District
- First mentioned: 1357

Area
  - Total: 35.13 km^{2} (13.56 sq mi)
- Elevation: 488 m (1,601 ft)

Population (2025)
  - Total: 1,116
- Time zone: UTC+1 (CET)
  - Summer (DST): UTC+2 (CEST)
- Postal code: 976 45
- Area code: +421 48
- Vehicle registration plate (until 2022): BR
- Website: www.hronecobec.sk

Hronec (Hungarian: Kisgaram, pronounced [ˈkiʒɡɒrɒm], until 1886: Rónicz) is a village and municipality in Brezno District, in the Banská Bystrica Region of central Slovakia.

== Geography ==
The municipality lies at an altitude of 488 metres (1,601 ft) and covers an area of 35.13 km^{2} (13.56 sq mi) (2025).

== History ==
In historical records, the village was first mentioned as Hronecz in 1357, when it was the dominion of Lypche Solienses. In 1390, it was mentioned as Horonecz. As Louis I of Hungary already in 1357 gave to the Royal forester's son - called Pál - the right of scultetus, in 1405 it was referred as Plantatio Pauli. In 1424 Kysgaran, in 1547 Ranitz and in the 19th century usually Rhonic was used. After, the official name was until 1886 Rónicz, when it was changed to Kisgaram. Eventually, as part of Czechoslovakia, Hronec became the official name.

== Population ==
Population statistic (10 years)
Year	1995	2005	2015	2025
Count	1154	1144	1231	1116
Difference		−0.86%	+7.60%	−9.34%

Population statistic
Year	2024	2025
Count	1121	1116
Difference		−0.44%

It has a population of 1116 people (31 December 2025).

=== Ethnicity ===
Census 2021 (1+ %)
Ethnicity	Number	Fraction
Slovak	1078	94.06%
Not found out	50	4.36%
Romani	29	2.53%
Total	1146	

In year 2021 was 1146 people by ethnicity 1078 as Slovak, 50 as Not found out, 29 as Romani, 11 as Czech, 4 as Rusyn, 3 as Russian, 3 as Moravian, 2 as Other, 1 as Hungarian and 1 as English.

Note on population: The difference values of population numbers in the table "Population statistic" and in the sections "Ethnicity" & "Religion" is caused by the use of various statistical methods.

=== Religion ===
Census 2021 (1+ %)
Religion	Number	Fraction
Roman Catholic Church	664	57.94%
None	335	29.23%
Not found out	90	7.85%
Evangelical Church	19	1.66%
Christian Congregations in Slovakia	13	1.13%
Greek Catholic Church	12	1.05%
Total	1146	

In year 2021 was 1146 people by religion 664 from Roman Catholic Church, 335 from None, 90 from Not found out, 19 from Evangelical Church, 13 from Christian Congregations in Slovakia, 12 from Greek Catholic Church, 4 from Baptists Church, 2 from Calvinist Church, 2 from Other, 2 from Ad hoc movements, 1 from Other and not ascertained christian church, 1 from Jehovah's Witnesses and 1 from Apostolic Church.

== Notable people ==
- Ladislav Chudík (1924–2015) - actor
- Viktória Forster (b. 2002) - athlete
- Veronika Machyniaková (b. 1997) - biathlete
- Alajos Szokolyi (1871–1932) – Hungarian sportsperson, bronze medalist at the first modern Olympics

== Genealogical resources ==
The records for genealogical research are available at the state archive "Statny Archiv in Banska Bystrica, Slovakia"

- Roman Catholic church records (births/marriages/deaths): 1679-1909 (parish A)
- Greek Catholic church records (births/marriages/deaths): 1775-1928 (parish B)
- Lutheran church records (births/marriages/deaths): 1784-1927 (parish B)

== See also ==
- List of municipalities and towns in Slovakia
