= Athletics at the 1896 Summer Olympics – Men's pole vault =

Men's pole vault at the Games of the I Olympiad
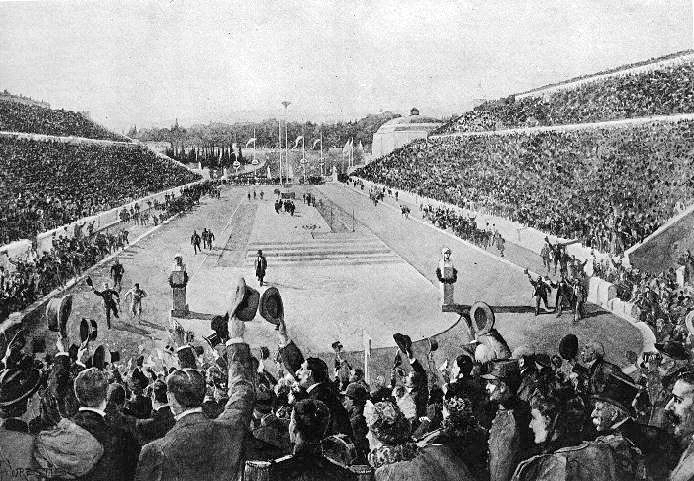
- The finish of the marathon interrupted the pole vault
- Venue: Panathinaiko Stadium
- Date: 10 April 1896
- Competitors: 5 from 2 nations
- Winning height: 3.30

Medalists
1st place, gold medalist(s)		William Hoyt; United States
2nd place, silver medalist(s)		Albert Tyler; United States
3rd place, bronze medalist(s)		Evangelos Damaskos; Greece
3rd place, bronze medalist(s)		Ioannis Theodoropoulos; Greece

The men's pole vault was one of four jumping events on the Athletics at the 1896 Summer Olympics programme. Five athletes competed in the pole vault. The two Americans far outclassed the three Greeks, starting higher than the Greeks could clear and taking first and second places. Damaskos and Theodoropoulos tied for third, while Xydas took fifth.

== Background ==
This was the first appearance of the event, which is one of 12 athletics events to have been held at every Summer Olympics. Eighteen athletes entered, but only five started. The world record holder was Walter Rodenbaugh, but he was absent along with five-time AAA winner Richard Dickinson of Great Britain. Of the vaulters present, William Hoyt was the favorite on the basis of a third-place finish at the 1895 ICAAAA.

== Competition format ==
There was a single round of vaulting. The bar started at 2.40 metres, increasing 10 centimetres at a time until 3.20 metres and then by 5 centimetres at a time.

== Records ==
These were the standing world and Olympic records (in metres) prior to the 1896 Summer Olympics.

World record	Walter Rodenbaugh (USA)^{*}	3.49 m (11 ft 5 1/4 in)	Philadelphia	17 September 1892
Olympic record	N/A			

^{*} unofficial

The following record was established during the competition:

Date	Event	Athlete	Nation	Distance (m)	Record
April 10	Final	William Hoyt	United States	3.30	OR

== Schedule ==
The exact time of the contest is not known; it was the fourth event of the afternoon session, following the 100 metres final, high jump, and 110 metres hurdles final. The pole vault took long enough that it was interrupted by the finish of the marathon.

Date		Time	Round
Gregorian	Julian	Time	Round
Friday, 10 April 1896	Friday, 29 March 1896		Final

== Results ==
Key

- o = Height cleared
- x = Height failed
- – = Height passed
- r = Retired
- SB = Season's best
- PB = Personal best
- NR = National record
- AR = Area record
- OR = Olympic record
- WR = World record
- WL = World lead
- NM = No mark
- DNS = Did not start
- DQ = Disqualified

The three Greeks began with the bar at 2.40 metres. All three made that mark. The bar was then raised 10 centimetres at a time, eliminating Xydas after he failed the second jump and the other two after they failed the fourth height. The American pair did not jump at any of those heights, instead beginning at 2.80 metres, a height that gave neither any difficulty. Tyler was unable to clear the 3.30 metres height, and Hoyt failed at 3.40 metres only.

Rank	Athlete	Nation	2.40	2.50	2.60	2.70	2.80	2.90	3.00	3.10	3.20	3.25	3.30	Height	Notes
1st place, gold medalist(s)	William Hoyt	United States	—	—	—	—	o	o	o	o	o	o	o	3.30	OR
2nd place, silver medalist(s)	Albert Tyler	United States	—	—	—	—	o	o	o	o	o	x	—	3.20	
3rd place, bronze medalist(s)	Evangelos Damaskos	Greece	o	o	o	x	—							2.60	
3rd place, bronze medalist(s)	Ioannis Theodoropoulos	Greece	o	o	o	x	—							2.60	
5	Vasilios Xydas	Greece	o	x	—									2.40	

== Sources ==
- Lampros, S.P.; Polites, N.G.; De Coubertin, Pierre; Philemon, P.J. & Anninos, C. (1897). The Olympic Games: BC 776 – AD 1896. Athens: Charles Beck. (Digitally available at la84foundation.org)
- Mallon, Bill & Widlund, Ture (1998). The 1896 Olympic Games. Results for All Competitors in All Events, with Commentary. Jefferson: McFarland. ISBN 0-7864-0379-9. (Excerpt available at la84foundation.org)
- Smith, Michael Llewellyn (2004). Olympics in Athens 1896. The Invention of the Modern Olympic Games. London: Profile Books. ISBN 1-86197-342-X.
