= 2019 Asian Junior and Cadet Table Tennis Championships =

Badminton tournament in Ulaanbaatar, Mongolia

Tournament details
- Dates: 2–7 September 2019
- Edition: 25th
- Venue: Buyant Ukhaa Sport Palace
- Location: Ulaanbaatar, Mongolia

The 2019 Asian Junior and Cadet Table Tennis Championships were held in Ulaanbaatar, Mongolia, from 2 to 7 September 2019. It was organised by the Mongolian Table Tennis Association under the authority of Asian Table Tennis Union (ATTU).

== Medal summary ==
=== Events ===
Event	Gold	Silver	Bronze
Junior boys' singles	China; Xu Yingbin	China; Xiang Peng	China; Liu Yebo
Junior boys' singles	China; Xu Yingbin	China; Xiang Peng	Japan; Hiroto Shinozuka
Junior girls' singles	Japan; Miyu Nagasaki	Japan; Kyoka Idesawa	China; Wu Yangchen
Junior girls' singles	Japan; Miyu Nagasaki	Japan; Kyoka Idesawa	Japan; Haruna Ojio
Junior boys' doubles	Japan; Yukiya Uda; Shunsuke Togami	Japan; Kakeru Sone; Hiroto Shinozuka	China; Liu Yebo; Xu Yingbin
Junior boys' doubles	Japan; Yukiya Uda; Shunsuke Togami	Japan; Kakeru Sone; Hiroto Shinozuka	Chinese Taipei; Tai Ming-Wei; Feng Yi-Hsin
Junior girls' doubles	Japan; Miyuu Kihara; Miyu Nagasaki	South Korea; Shin Yubin; Ryu Hanna	Hong Kong; Ng Wing Lam; Fung Wai Chu
Junior girls' doubles	Japan; Miyuu Kihara; Miyu Nagasaki	South Korea; Shin Yubin; Ryu Hanna	Japan; Haruna Ojio; Kyoka Idesawa
Junior mixed doubles	China; Xu Yingbin; Shi Xunyao	China; Liu Yebo; Wu Yangchen	Japan; Yukiya Uda; Miyuu Kihara
Junior mixed doubles	China; Xu Yingbin; Shi Xunyao	China; Liu Yebo; Wu Yangchen	South Korea; Jung Seongwon; Choi Haeeun
Junior boys' team	China; Liu Yebo; Xu Yingbin; Zeng Beixun; Xiang Peng	India; Raegan Albuquerque; Manush Utpalbhai Shah; Deepit Patil; Anukram Jain	Chinese Taipei; Tai Ming-wei; Feng Yi-hsin; Huang Yu-jen; Li Hsin-Yu
Junior boys' team	China; Liu Yebo; Xu Yingbin; Zeng Beixun; Xiang Peng	India; Raegan Albuquerque; Manush Utpalbhai Shah; Deepit Patil; Anukram Jain	South Korea; Jung Seongwon; Kim Woojin; Park Gyuhyeon; Lee Gihun
Junior girls' team	China; Wu Yangchen; Shi Xunyao; Kuai Man; Huang Yingqi	North Korea; Kim Un-song; Pak Su Gyong; Kim Kum-yong; Pyon Song-gyong	Japan; Miyuu Kihara; Miyu Nagasaki; Haruna Ojio; Kyoka Idesawa
Junior girls' team	China; Wu Yangchen; Shi Xunyao; Kuai Man; Huang Yingqi	North Korea; Kim Un-song; Pak Su Gyong; Kim Kum-yong; Pyon Song-gyong	South Korea; Shin Yubin; Choi Haeeun; Ryu Hanna; Lee Daeun
Cadet boys' singles	China; Chen Yuanyu	India; Payas Jain	South Korea; Jang Seongil
Cadet boys' singles	China; Chen Yuanyu	India; Payas Jain	South Korea; Lim Yunoh
Cadet girls' singles	China; Chen Yi	Japan; Kaho Akae	Japan; Sakura Yokoi
Cadet girls' singles	China; Chen Yi	Japan; Kaho Akae	China; Xu Yi
Cadet boys' team	China; Xu Hongrui; Huang Youzheng; Chen Yuanyu	Chinese Taipei; Chuang Chia-Chuan; Chang Yu-An; Kao Cheng-Jui	Hong Kong; Yiu Kwan To; Chan Baldwin Ho Wah; Li Hon Man
Cadet boys' team	China; Xu Hongrui; Huang Youzheng; Chen Yuanyu	Chinese Taipei; Chuang Chia-Chuan; Chang Yu-An; Kao Cheng-Jui	South Korea; Jang Seongil; Gil Minseok; Lim Yunoh
Cadet girls' team	China; Chen Yi; Xu Yi; Sun Xiaomeng	South Korea; Kim Nayeong; Kim Seongjin; Lee Yeonhui	Japan; Sakura Yokoi; Miwa Harimoto; Kaho Akae
Cadet girls' team	China; Chen Yi; Xu Yi; Sun Xiaomeng	South Korea; Kim Nayeong; Kim Seongjin; Lee Yeonhui	Singapore; Zhou Jingyi; Tan Zhao Yun; Ser Lin Qian

=== Medal table ===
Rank	Nation	Gold	Silver	Bronze	Total
1	China	8	2	4	14
2	Japan	3	3	7	13
3	South Korea	0	2	6	8
4	India	0	2	0	2
5	Chinese Taipei	0	1	2	3
6	North Korea	0	1	0	1
7	Hong Kong	0	0	2	2
8	Singapore	0	0	1	1
Totals (8 entries)		11	11	22	44

== See also ==
- 2019 World Junior Table Tennis Championships
- 2019 Asian Table Tennis Championships
- Asian Table Tennis Union
