= Veronika Machyniaková =

Slovak biathlete (born 1997)

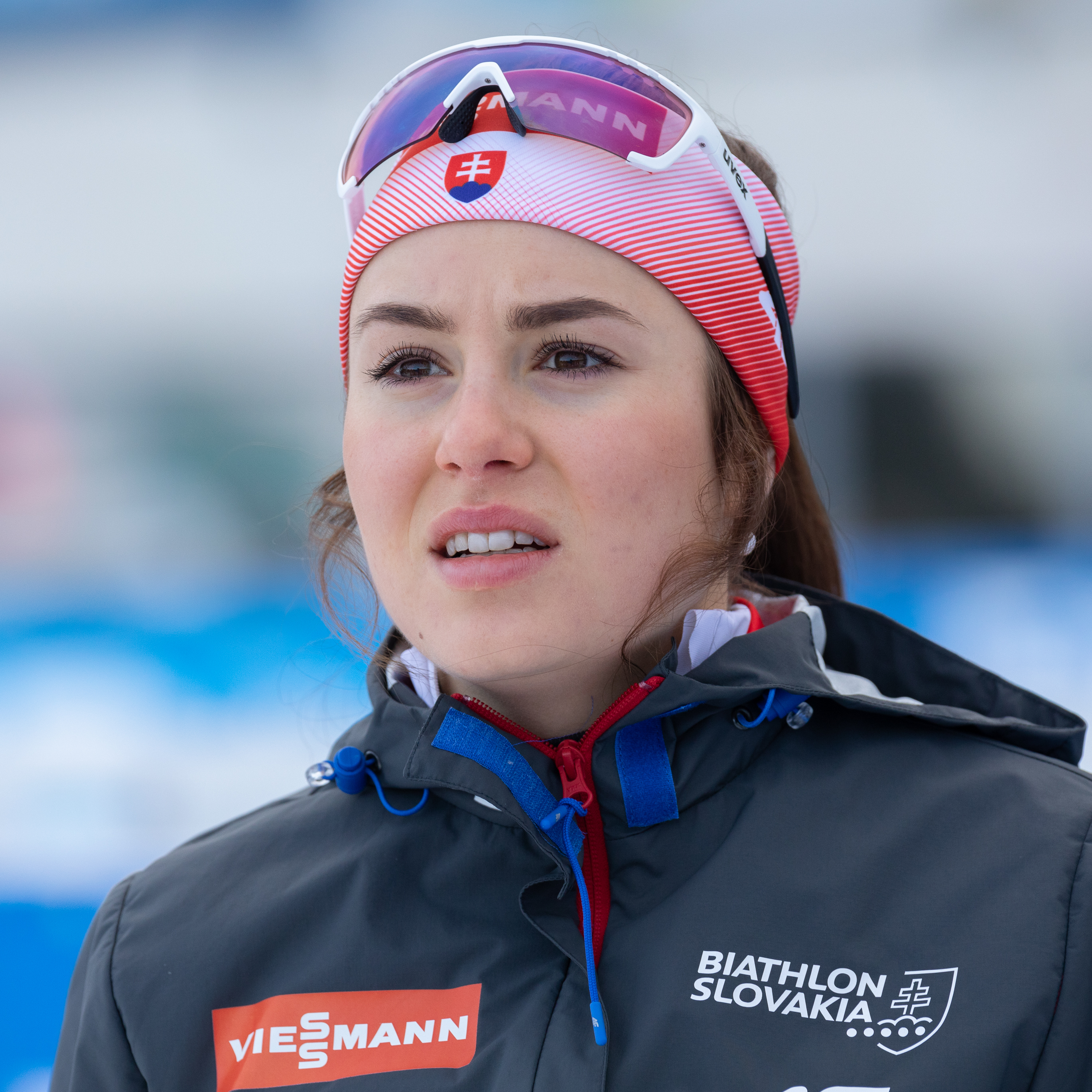
- Machyniaková in 2020

Personal information
- Born: 14 September 1997 (age 28) Hronec, Slovakia

Sport

Professional information
- Sport: Biathlon
- Club: Dukla Banská Bystrica
- World Cup debut: 2019

Veronika Machyniaková (born 14 September 1997) is a retired Slovak biathlete who competed at the 2022 Winter Olympics held in Beijing, China.

== Biography ==
Veronika Machyniaková was born on 14 September 1997 in the village of Hronec, close to Brezno. Her father Ľubomír Machyniak is a former professional biathlete who competed at the 1998 Winter Olympics and became a Slovak Biathlon Association functionary after retirement. Her younger sister Júlia is a biathlete as well. While competing in professional biathlon, Machyniaková graduated in economics from the Matej Bel University.

== Career ==
As a junior, Machyniaková trained with KB Osrblie. In the 2019/20 session, she advanced to the Senior national team to fill the vacant space left by the retirement of Anastasiya Kuzmina. Despite excellent performance at shooting, she only achieved average results overall. Her best career result was the 15th place at the 2021 IBU Open European Championships.

Despite her mixed performances, Machynová was a part of the Slovak biathlon team at the 2022 Winter Olympics in China as a replacement for the Remeň twins, who refused to get vaccinated against COVID-19. Following her disappointing performance in the Olympics, Machyniaková retired from competitive biathlon.

== Career results ==
=== Olympic Games ===
0 medals

Event	Individual	Sprint	Pursuit	Mass start	Relay	Mixed relay
(China) 2022 Beijing	83rd	88th	—	—	19th	—

=== World Championships ===
0 medals

Event	Individual	Sprint	Pursuit	Mass start	Relay	Mixed relay	Single mixed relay
(Italy) 2020 Antholz	63rd	92nd	—	—	17th	19th	26th
(Slovenia) 2021 Pokljuka	89th	93rd	—	—	21st	—	—
