= Alexandros Chalkokondylis =

Greek sprinter and long jumper

- Chalkokondylis in 1896

Personal information
- Born: 1880 Athens, Greece
- Died: 15 February 1970 (aged 89–90)

Sport
- Sport: Sprinting
- Events: 100m, long jump

Alexandros Chalkokondylis (Greek: Αλέξανδρος Χαλκοκονδύλης, born 1880 - 15 February 1970), also transliterated at Khalkokondylis, was a Greek athlete. He was born in Athens.

Chalkokondylis competed in the 1896 Greek national championships, which served as qualifiers for the revived Olympic Games to be held later that year. He represented the Athletic Club of Athens (Athlitikos Omilos Athinon). He won the 100 metres (at 13.2 seconds), 400 metres (1:01.6), and long jump (5.68 metres) events. These marks were recognized as the first Greek national records for those events.

He competed at the 1896 Summer Olympics in Athens. He competed in the long jump, placing fourth of the nine jumpers. His best jump was 5.74 metres. He did not compete in the 400 metres.

In the 100 meters competition, Chalkokondylis placed second in his initial heat with a time of 12.75 seconds. In the final, he came in at 12.6 seconds, just barely behind the joint bronze medalists Francis Lane and Alajos Szokolyi to finish in fifth place.
