= Table tennis at the 2024 Summer Olympics – Mixed doubles =

Table tennis – mixed doubles at the Games of the XXXIII Olympiad
- Venue: Paris Expo Porte de Versailles
- Date: 27–30 July
- Competitors: 32 from 16 nations
- Teams: 16

Medalists
1st place, gold medalist(s)		Wang Chuqin; Sun Yingsha	China
2nd place, silver medalist(s)		Ri Jong-sik; Kim Kum-yong	North Korea
3rd place, bronze medalist(s)		Lim Jong-hoon; Shin Yu-bin	South Korea

The mixed doubles table tennis event was part of the table tennis programme at the 2024 Summer Olympics in Paris. The event took place from 27 to 30 July 2024 at Paris Expo Porte de Versailles.

The defending champions were Jun Mizutani and Mima Ito, but Mizutani retired from table tennis shortly after inaugural appearance in Tokyo and Ito was not chosen to participate, they replaced with different partners, Tomokazu Harimoto and Hina Hayata, but they lost to eventual silver medalists Ri Jong-sik and Kim Kum-yong.

== Schedule ==
Legend
P	Preliminary round	¼	Quarter-finals	½	Semi-finals	F	Final

Sat 27	Sun 28	Mon 29	Tue 30
P	¼	½	F

== Draw ==
The draw was held on 24 July 2024.

== Seeds ==
The seeds were revealed on 16 July 2024.

1. Wang Chuqin / Sun Yingsha (CHN) (champions, gold medalists)
2. Tomokazu Harimoto / Hina Hayata (JPN) (first round)
3. Lim Jong-hoon / Shin Yu-bin (KOR) (semifinals, bronze medalists)
4. Wong Chun Ting / Doo Hoi Kem (HKG) (semifinals, fourth place)
5. Álvaro Robles / María Xiao (ESP) (quarterfinals)
6. Lin Yun-ju / Chen Szu-yu (TPE) (quarterfinals)
7. Ovidiu Ionescu / Bernadette Szőcs (ROU) (quarterfinals)
8. Kristian Karlsson / Christina Källberg (SWE) (quarterfinals)
9. Alexis Lebrun / Jia Nan Yuan (FRA) (first round)
10. Dang Qiu / Nina Mittelham (GER) (first round)
11. Nandor Ecseki / Dóra Madarász (HUN) (first round)
12. Vitor Ishiy / Bruna Takahashi (BRA) (first round)
13. Omar Assar / Dina Meshref (EGY) (first round)
14. Jorge Campos / Daniela Fonseca (CUB) (first round)
15. Nicholas Lum / Min Hyung Jee (AUS) (first round)
16. Ri Jong-sik / Kim Kum-yong (PRK) (final, silver medalists)

== Results ==
First round
1	Wang C.Q. (CHN); Sun Y.S. (CHN)	11	11	11	11
13	O. Assar (EGY); D. Meshref (EGY)	7	8	4	3
9	A. Lebrun (FRA); J.N. Yuan (FRA)	9	11	5	10	11	7
6	Lin Y.J. (TPE); Chen S.Y. (TPE)	11	9	11	12	2	11
7	O. Ionescu (ROU); B. Szőcs (ROU)	11	6	14	11	11
15	N. Lum (AUS); M.H. Jee (AUS)	5	11	12	4	3
10	D. Qiu (GER); N. Mittelham (GER)	10	9	10	6
3	Lim J.H. (KOR); Shin Y.B. (KOR)	12	11	12	11
4	Wong C.T. (HKG); Doo H.K. (HKG)	11	11	4	11	11
11	N. Ecseki (HUN); D. Madarász (HUN)	9	8	11	6	8
12	V. Ishiy (BRA); B. Takahashi (BRA)	9	11	11	8	5	8
5	Á. Robles (ESP); M. Xiao (ESP)	11	7	7	11	11	11
8	K. Karlsson (SWE); C. Källberg (SWE)	6	12	11	11	11
14	J. Campos (CUB); D. Fonseca (CUB)	11	10	9	7	9
16	Ri J.S. (PRK); Kim K.Y. (PRK)	11	7	11	15	12
2	T. Harimoto (JPN); H. Hayata (JPN)	5	11	4	13	10

Quarterfinals
1	Wang C.Q. (CHN); Sun Y.S. (CHN)	7	11	6	11	11	11
6	Lin Y.J. (TPE); Chen S.Y. (TPE)	11	6	11	7	9	3
7	O. Ionescu (ROU); B. Szőcs (ROU)	11	8	8	8
3	Lim J.H. (KOR); Shin Y.B. (KOR)	13	11	11	11
4	Wong C.T. (HKG); Doo H.K. (HKG)	9	11	11	10	11	11
5	Á. Robles (ESP); M. Xiao (ESP)	11	9	4	12	2	8
8	K. Karlsson (SWE); C. Källberg (SWE)	7	8	11	4	8
16	Ri J.S. (PRK); Kim K.Y. (PRK)	11	11	9	11	11

Semifinals
1	Wang C.Q. (CHN); Sun Y.S. (CHN)	6	11	9	11	11	11
3	Lim J.H. (KOR); Shin Y.B. (KOR)	11	7	11	5	7	9
4	Wong C.T. (HKG); Doo H.K. (HKG)	3	12	11	9	9	11	6
16	Ri J.S. (PRK); Kim K.Y. (PRK)	11	10	3	11	11	9	11

Gold medal match
1	Wang C.Q. (CHN); Sun Y.S. (CHN)	11	7	11	11	7	11
16	Ri J.S. (PRK); Kim K.Y. (PRK)	6	11	8	5	11	8
Bronze medal match
3	Lim J.H. (KOR); Shin Y.B. (KOR)	11	11	11	14
4	Wong C.T. (HKG); Doo H.K. (HKG)	5	7	7	12
