= Evangelos Damaskos =

Greek pole vaulter

Medal record

Men's athletics

Representing Greece

Olympic Games
| Bronze medal – third place | 1896 Athens | Pole vault |

Evangelos Damaskos (Greek: Ευάγγελος Δαμάσκος) was a Greek pole vaulter. He was born in Acharnes, Athens, Greece. He competed at the 1896 Summer Olympics in Athens. Damaskos competed in the pole vault. He tied with fellow Greek Ioannis Theodoropoulos for third place in the event, with a height of 2.60 metres.
