= Anastasios Andreou =

Cypriot athlete (1877–1947)

Anastasios Andreou (Greek: Αναστάσιος Ανδρέου; 1877 in Limassol – 1947) was a Greek athlete from Cyprus. He competed at the 1896 Summer Olympics in Athens.

He was successful in the first Pan Cypriot games in 1896, winning the 100 metres and 110 metres hurdles. He represented Cyprus in the first Pan-Hellenic Games in the 110 metres hurdling.

== Biography ==
He was born in Limassol in 1877. He studied at the Greek School of Limassol where he was declared Multi-victorious Champion.

He was a volunteer in the Greek army for the Greek-Turkish war of 1897 and fought in Domokos, Derven, Phoulnea and Farsala.

He married Penelope Eraclidou and had one son and two daughters. He died in 1947.

== Honors ==
His success in Pan-Hellenic Games and participation at Olympics were an honour for Sport in Cyprus.
