= Ioannis Theodoropoulos =

Greek pole vaulter

Medal record

Men's athletics

Representing Greece

Olympic Games
Bronze medal – third place	1896 Athens	Pole vault

Ioannis Theodoropoulos (Greek: Ιωάννης Θεοδωρόπουλος) was a Greek pole vaulter. He competed at the 1896 Summer Olympics in Athens. He was born in Evrytania. Theodoropoulos competed in the pole vault. He tied with fellow Greek Evangelos Damaskos for third place in the event, with a height of 2.60 metres.
