= Alexandre Tuffèri =

Athletics competitor

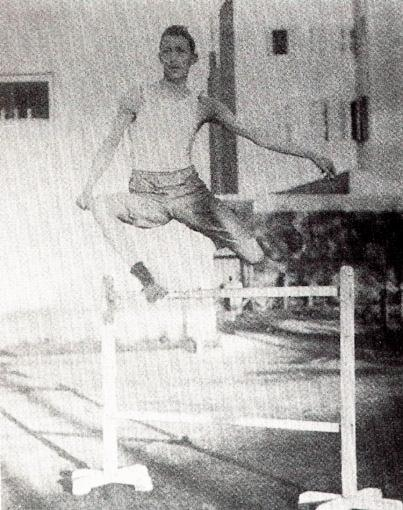
- Tuffèri in 1896

Personal information
- Born: June 8, 1876 Athens
- Died: March 14, 1958 (aged 81) Athens

Sport
- Country: France
- Sport: Athletics
Medal record
Men's athletics
Representing France
Olympic Games
Silver medal – second place	1896 Athens	Triple jump

Pierre Alexandre Tuffèri (Greek: Αλέξανδρος Τουφερής - Alexandros Touferis) (born 8 June 1876 in Athens – died 14 March 1958 in Athens), also spelt Tuffère, was a French-Greek athlete, although he was born and lived in Athens, his father was French. He competed at the 1896 Summer Olympics and the 1900 Summer Olympics for France, and the 1906 Intercalated Games for Greece.

Following the refusal from the International Olympic Committee allowing him to represent Greece he entered the 1896 Summer Olympics representing France, his first event was the triple jump and after jumping 12.70 metres he finished in second place behind James Connolly of the United States and thus becoming the first French medallist. The next day Tuffère competed in the long jump but there is no record of the distance he jumped and it is just known he did not finish in the top four.

Four years later, Tuffère competed in the 1900 Summer Olympics held in Paris, and again he was representing the French, he entered the triple jump and again there is no known distance he jumped but did finish in sixth place.

Tuffère the competed in the 1906 Intercalated Games, this time representing Greece, where he entered the 110 metres hurdles. He finished fourth in his heat and did not qualify for the final. He also entered the standing long jump, finishing in seventh place out of 30 starters when he jumped 2.855 metres.

In November 1940, Tuffère, who was living in Athens at the time, was nominated as the head of a gaullist group, organized by sympathizers of the Free French movement. However, the true leader of the group, initiated by general Georges Catroux who was in Cairo at the time, was Octave Merlier.
