= Grantley Goulding =

British track and field athlete

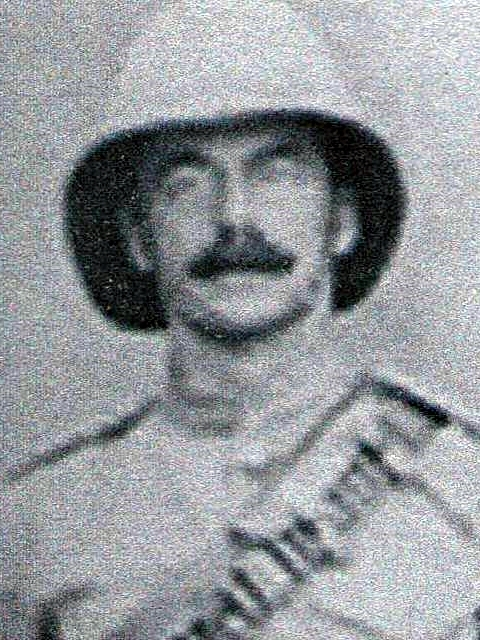
- Goulding in military uniform

Personal information
- Nationality: British (English)
- Born: 23 March 1874 Hartpury, Gloucestershire, England
- Died: 29 July 1947 (aged 73) Umkomaas, KwaZulu-Natal, Union of South Africa

Sport
- Sport: Athletics
- Event: hurdles/400 m
- Club: Gloucester AC
Medal record
Men's athletics
Representing Great Britain
Olympic Games
Silver medal – second place	1896 Athens	110 m hurdles

Grantley Thomas Smart Goulding (23 March 1874 – 29 July 1947) was a British athlete. He competed at the 1896 Summer Olympics in Athens.

== Biography ==
Goulding was born in Hartpury, Gloucestershire to a rich farming family. He later emigrated to South Africa and settled on the Natal coast. Goulding was a member of the Gloucester Cricket Club and first gained prominence as a local athlete in the Gloucestershire area when he won a number of races in the 1895 season. In a meeting at Gloucester he defeated the visiting South African champion but was less successful at the AAA championships where he finished last in his heat.

Goulding competed in the 110 metres hurdles in Athens. He finished in first place in his preliminary heat with a time of 18.4 seconds, advancing to the final. In the final he faced only Thomas Curtis of the United States after two other finalists had withdrawn. A stumble from Goulding at the start of the race appears to have been decisive; although he gained ground on Curtis after halfway, he could not close the gap. At the end of the race, the officials declared that Curtis had won by a margin of a mere 5 centimetres. Both finished in 17.6 seconds. In 1932, Curtis wrote in The Sportsman that Goulding "stopped neither to linger or say farewell, but went straight from the stadium to the station and took the first train out of Athens".

In the 1984 NBC miniseries, The First Olympics: Athens 1896, he was portrayed as being very pompous and having a habit of taking his opponents (especially the Americans) very lightly. He exhibited such poor sportsmanship that British officials (and Pierre de Coubertin) came to resent him. When he finished the 110 Metre Hurdles final, he was booed raucously by the crowd and pelted with fruit. He died in Umkomaas, Natal, South Africa in 1947.
