= Athanasios Skaltsogiannis =

Greek athlete

Athanasios Skaltsogiannis (Greek: Αθανάσιος Σκαλτσογιάννης, born 1878, date of death unknown) was a Greek athlete. He competed at the 1896 Summer Olympics in Athens. He was born in Aitolikon.

Skaltsogiannis competed in the 110 metres hurdles. His time and place in the preliminary heat is not recorded, but it is known that he finished third or fourth and did not advance to the final. Skaltsogiannis was one of nine athletes to compete in the long jump. The only information known about his placing in the event is that he was not one of the top four.

He fought for the freedom of Epirus. Later he served as an officer of the guard and was murdered by a prisoner in the Mendrese prison.
