= Henrik Sjöberg =

Swedish sportsman

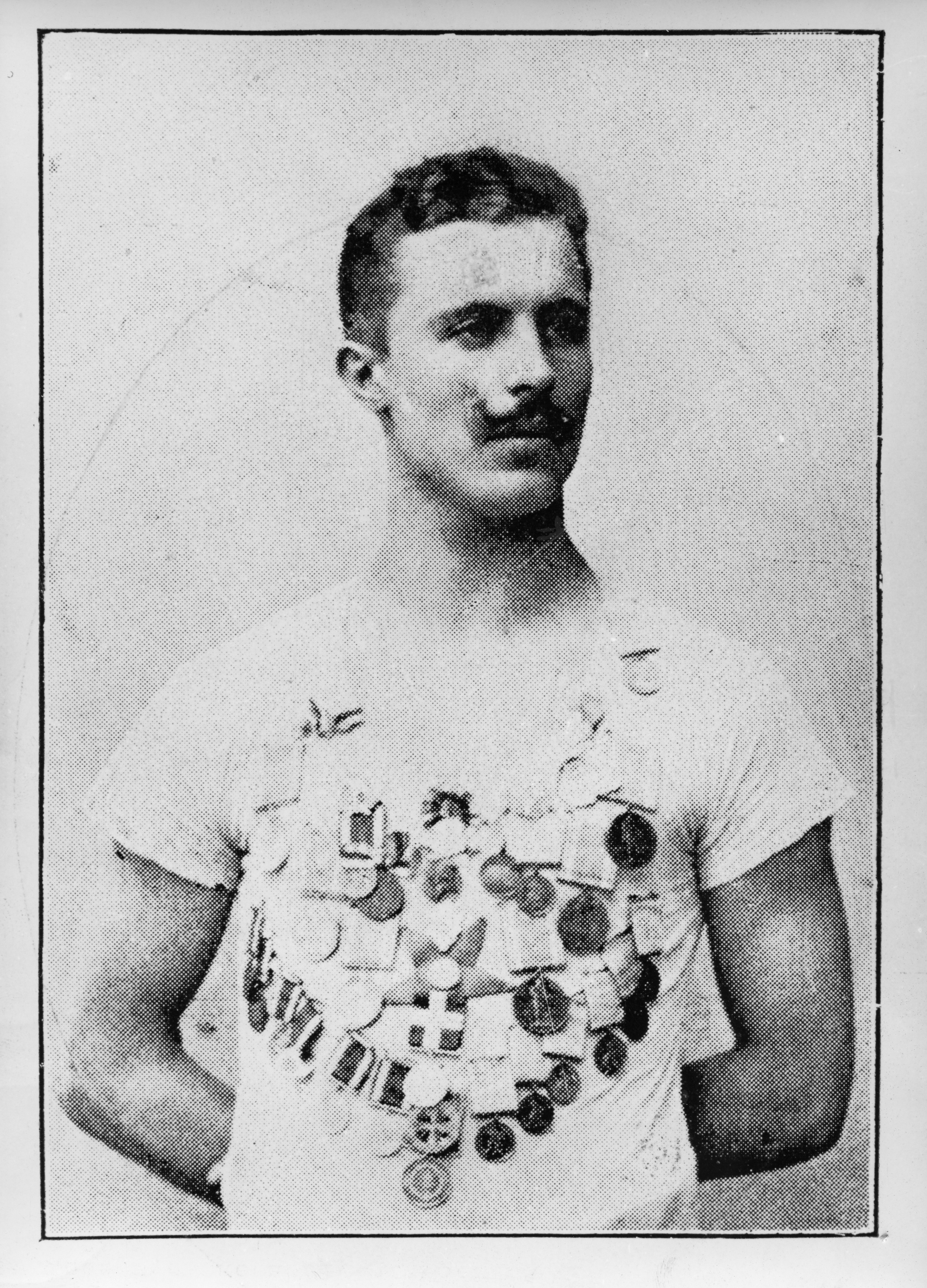
- Portrait of Sjöberg

Personal information
- Full name: Kristian Henrik Rudolf Sjöberg
- Born: 20 January 1875 Uppsala, United Kingdoms of Sweden and Norway
- Died: 1 August 1905 (aged 30) Helsingør, Denmark

Gymnastics career
- Discipline: Men's artistic gymnastics
- Country represented: Sweden
- Club: Stockholms Amatör Förening

Kristian Henrik Rudolf Sjöberg (20 January 1875 in Stockholm – 1 August 1905 in Helsingør) was a Swedish gymnast, athlete, and medical student. He competed as the only Swedish participant at the 1896 Summer Olympics in Athens.

Sjöberg from 1892 competed for Stockholm AF, and in the same year he held the unofficial Swedish record for the long jump with 6.09 metres, even though he completely lacked the support from the Swedish Sports Confederation he refused to see himself omitted from the first Olympic Games.

At the 1896 Summer Olympics, Sjöberg competed in five different events, one on the athletics track, three in the athletics field and one as a gymnast, on the track he competed in the 100 metres, his time is unknown and records only show he finished in fourth or fifth place in his heat so didn't qualify for the final. In the athletics field he competed in the discus, his distance is unknown and finished outside the top four, in the long jump, again his distance is unknown and was placed outside the top four, his best result was in the high jump where he cleared 1.60 metres to finish in fourth place just 5 centimetres short of a medal.

Sjöberg also competed in the vault event in the gymnastics with 14 other competitors, in which they had two minutes to carry out as many jumps as they wished, again no score or position is recorded for his efforts.

Sjöberg drowned during his summer stay in the eastern Denmark town of Helsingør in 1905.
