= Kim Kum Yong =

North Korean table tennis player (born 2001)

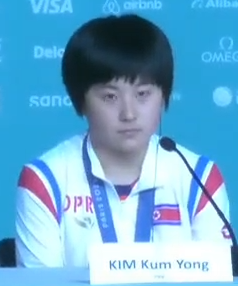
- Kim in 2024

Personal information
- Born: 17 August 2001 (age 25) Pyongyang, North Korea

Sport
- Sport: Table tennis
- Playing style: Left-handed, shakehand grip
- Highest ranking: 45 (3 June 2025)
- Current ranking: 165 (28 September 2026)
Medal record
Women's table tennis
Representing North Korea
Olympic Games
Silver medal – second place	2024 Paris	Mixed doubles
Asian Games
Bronze medal – third place	2026 Aichi-Nagoya	Team
Asian Championships
Gold medal – first place	2024 Astana	Singles
Silver medal – second place	2024 Astana	Mixed doubles
Asian Junior and Cadet Championships
Silver medal – second place	2019 Ulaanbaatar	Team

Korean name
- Hangul: 김금영
- RR: Gim Geumyeong
- MR: Kim Kŭmyŏng

Kim Kum Yong (Korean: 김금영; born 17 August 2001) is a North Korean table tennis player. She is a left-handed attacker and uses the shakehand grip. At the 2024 Summer Olympics she won a silver medal in the mixed doubles tournament alongside Ri Jong Sik. She is the defending Women's Singles Asian Champion.

Born in Pyongyang, Kim began competing internationally in 2018 and achieved early success at the junior level, including a silver medal in the girls' team event at the 2019 Asian Junior and Cadet Table Tennis Championships. In 2020 she began a three-year hiatus from international competition alongside the rest of the North Korean table tennis team, returning for the 2022 Asian Games held in 2023.

Like her mixed doubles partner Ri, Kim qualified for the 2024 Summer Olympics as an unranked and relatively unknown player, but the pair managed to advance to the mixed doubles final after defeating much higher-ranked opponents, including defending champions Japan, before losing to China. Later that year, she won the women's singles title at the Asian Table Tennis Championships.

== Early international career (2018–2019) ==
Kim was born on 17 August 2001 in Pyongyang, North Korea. She is a left-handed attacker and uses the shakehand grip in table tennis.

She participated in her first two international competitions at the DPR Korea Open in 2018 and the Pyongyang Open in 2019. She played at the 2019 Asian Junior and Cadet Table Tennis Championships and won the silver medal in the girls' team event. Later that year, she competed in the World Junior Table Tennis Championships, reaching the semifinals in the girls' singles and girls' teams events.

== Return to international competition and Olympic debut (2023–2024) ==
Starting in 2020, North Korea's table tennis team stopped attending international competitions; they returned three years later for the 2022 Asian Games (held in 2023), where Kim competed in four events but did not win a medal. In April 2024, Kim and her mixed doubles partner Ri Jong Sik qualified for the 2024 Summer Olympics by defeating Spain in the ITTF World Olympic Qualification Tournament, 4–3.

Kim and Ri, unranked by the International Table Tennis Federation (ITTF) due to their limited experience in international competitions, were the last-ranked team in the Olympic mixed doubles competition and faced defending champion Japan – ranked second globally – in the opening round. In a major upset, the North Korean pair defeated Japan by a score of 4–1. The pair followed it up by defeating Sweden and then Hong Kong to reach the tournament finals against China. They were defeated in the finals, 4–2, and thus received the silver medal, becoming the first Olympic medal–winners from North Korea in eight years. After the tournament, the pair, having previously avoided the media, briefly answered questions at a press conference, with Kim noting: "We prepared a lot for the Olympics. We had a good performance but there are some regrets. We'll do better next time to win the gold."

Kim is noted for using a rare type of table tennis racket, featuring long pimpled rubber on the backside, which Reuters stated "caught many top players off guard" at the Olympics. Swedish player Kristian Karlsson noted: "Her serve gave me a lot of trouble. Some of them looked easy, but I missed them. The rubber she uses is very unusual among female players and almost nonexistent among male players."

Following their silver medal, Kim and Ri shared a selfie on the podium with their fellow medalists, including Lim Jong-hoon and Shin Yu-bin of South Korea. This was celebrated around the world as a moment of good sportsmanship, but reportedly led to criticism from the North Korean authorities, who according to Daily NK placed Kim and Ri under "ideological scrutiny" upon their return to the country.

== After the 2024 Summer Olympics ==
Kim saw further success in 2024 at that year's Asian Table Tennis Championships. She won silver with Ri once again in the mixed doubles event and defeated Japan's Miwa Harimoto in the finals of the women's singles event to earn her first gold medal and become the Women's Singles Asian Champion. The following year she competed in the same events at the 2025 World Table Tennis Championships, again partnering with Ri, but she did not reach the knockout stage of either event.

In the 2026 Asian Games, the North Korean women's team, led by Kim, won a bronze medal. She reached the quarterfinals of the singles event, where she was eliminated by Miwa Harimoto. Together with Cha Su Yong, she reached the round of 32 in the doubles event, where they were eliminated by China's Chen Yi and Fan Shuhan. In the mixed doubles event, she and Ri reached the round of 32 before losing in straight sets to the eventual champions and 4th seeds, China's Kuai Man and Lin Shidong.
