= Ri Jong Sik =

North Korean table tennis player (born 2000)

Personal information
- Born: 14 February 2000 (age 26) Pyongyang, North Korea

Sport
- Sport: Table tennis
- Current ranking: 196 (28 September 2026)
Medal record
Men's table tennis
Representing North Korea
Olympic Games
| Silver medal – second place | 2024 Paris | Mixed doubles |
Asian Championships
| Silver medal – second place | 2024 Astana | Mixed doubles |

Korean name
- Hangul: 리정식
- RR: Ri Jeongsik
- MR: Ri Chŏngsik

Ri Jong Sik (Korean: 리정식; born 14 February 2000) is a North Korean table tennis player. He qualified for the 2024 Summer Olympics and won a silver medal in the mixed doubles tournament along with Kim Kum Yong.

== Biography ==
Ri was born on 14 February 2000 in Pyongyang, North Korea. In 2015, he participated at the Asian Junior and Cadet Table Tennis Championships. He played at the DPR Korea Open in 2016, 2017, and 2018. In 2019, Ri played in the China Open in June, the Pyongyang Open in July, and at the 2019 Asian Table Tennis Championships in September. He reached the third round of the men's singles at the Asian championships and won three rounds of the men's doubles – partnered with Ham Yu-song – before being defeated by the Hong Kong team.

Ri competed at the 2022 Asian Games, held in 2023, in four events, with top 16 appearances in three events, but did not medal. In April 2024, Ri and his mixed doubles partner Kim Kum Yong qualified for the 2024 Summer Olympics by defeating Spain in the ITTF World Olympic Qualification Tournament, 4–3.

Ri and Kim, unranked by the International Table Tennis Federation (ITTF) due to their limited experience in international competitions, were the last-ranked team in the Olympic mixed doubles competition and faced defending champion Japan – ranked second globally – in the opening round. In a major upset, the North Korean pair defeated Japan by a score of 4–1. Ri and Kim followed it up by defeating eighth-seeded Sweden and then fourth-seeded Hong Kong to reach the tournament finals against China. They were defeated in the finals, 4–2, and thus received the silver medal, becoming the first Olympic medal-winners from North Korea in eight years.

Following their silver medal, Ri and Kim shared a selfie on the podium with their fellow medallists, including Lim Jong-hoon and Shin Yu-bin of South Korea. This was celebrated around the world as a moment of great sportsmanship, but reportedly led to criticism from the North Korean authorities, who according to The Guardian placed Ri and Kim under "ideological scrutiny" upon their return to the country.
