= Albert Tyler (athlete) =

American pole vaulter (1872–1945)

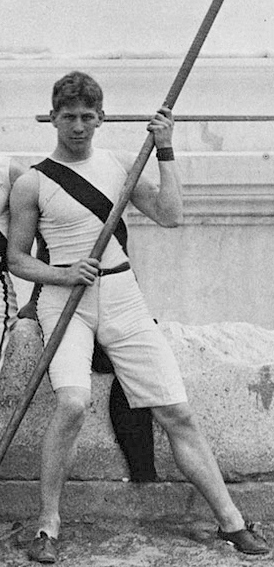
- Tyler at the 1896 Olympics

Personal information
- Born: January 4, 1872 Glendale, Ohio, U.S.
- Died: July 25, 1945 (aged 73) East Harpswell, Maine, U.S.
- Education: Princeton University

Sport
- Sport: Athletics
- Event: Pole vault
- Club: Princeton Tigers

Achievements and titles
- Personal best: 3.30 m (1897)
Medal record
Representing the United States
Olympic Games
| Silver medal – second place | 1896 Athens | Pole vault |

Albert Clinton Tyler (January 4, 1872 – July 25, 1945) was an American pole vaulter who won a silver medal at the 1896 Summer Olympics in Athens.

Tyler was from Wyoming, Ohio and graduated in the 1888 high school class of Franklin, Ohio. He began his studies at Princeton University in 1893, and while he was there, Tyler played American football (right tackle position) and baseball in addition to pole vaulting. He traveled to Athens, Greece in April 1896 to represent the United States in the Summer Olympic Games. At the time, his personal record was 10'10" (3.3 m), which he expected to beat. Tyler cleared a height of 3.3 meters, tying his personal best, and received a silver medal. He competed in additional pole vault competitions, including a February 1897 event at Madison Square Garden with 5,000 spectators, where he came in third. Tyler graduated from Princeton in 1897 and became a school teacher and football official. In 1945, at the age of 73, Tyler died of pneumonia while on vacation in Maine.
