= Thomas Curtis (athlete) =

American athlete

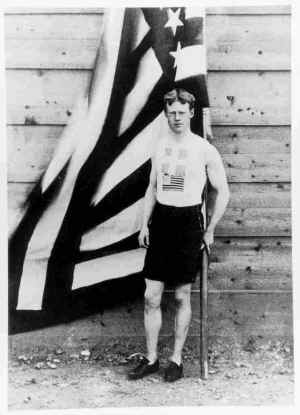

Personal information
- Born: January 9, 1873 San Francisco, California, U.S.
- Died: May 23, 1944 (aged 71) Nahant, Massachusetts, U.S.
- Height: 5 ft 9 in (175 cm)
- Weight: 146 lb (66 kg)

Sport
- Sport: Sprinting
- Events: 100 m, 110 m hurdles
Medal record
Men's athletics
Representing the United States
Olympic Games
Gold medal – first place	1896 Athens	110 metre hurdles

Thomas Pelham Curtis (January 9, 1873 – May 23, 1944) was an American athlete and the winner of the 110 metres hurdles at the 1896 Summer Olympics.

Curtis, a Massachusetts Institute of Technology student of electrical engineering, travelled to Athens as a member of the Boston Athletic Association. Curtis was also a student at Columbia University.

At the first day of the first modern Olympic Games, Curtis advanced to the 100 metres final by winning his heat with a time of 12.2 seconds. He later withdrew from that race to prepare for the 110 metres hurdles final, which was his main event at the Olympics. That competition turned into a personal race between Curtis and Grantley Goulding from Great Britain after Frantz Reichel and William Welles Hoyt withdrew. At the start Curtis gained a small lead, but Goulding reached him at the first hurdle. At the last hurdle, Goulding was leading, but Curtis managed to throw himself to the line first. The officials stated that Curtis had won by 5 centimetres. Both athletes had a time of 17.6 seconds.

As an eager amateur photographer, Curtis made many valuable pictures in Athens. He did serve as captain in the Massachusetts National Guard and acted as a military aide to Massachusetts Governor Calvin Coolidge during World War I. His service reflected both military commitment and a connection to prominent political figures of the time. He also participated in the development of the toaster and published several humorous memories about the first modern Olympic Games. The most famous of them is High Hurdles and White Gloves (1932).
