= William Hoyt (athlete) =

American pole vaulter (1875–1954)

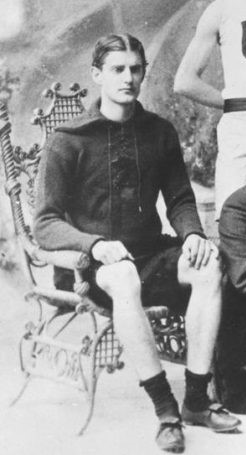

Medal record

Men's athletics

Representing the United States

Olympic Games
| Gold medal – first place | 1896 Athens | Pole vault |

William Welles Hoyt (May 7, 1875 – December 1, 1954) was an American track and field athlete. He competed at the 1896 Summer Olympics in Athens. He was born in Glastonbury, Connecticut.

Hoyt competed in the pole vault, winning the event with a height of 3.30 metres. He also ran the 110 metres hurdles. He placed second in his heat, after Thomas Curtis, but did not run in the final.

== Biography ==
Hoyt received his secondary education at The Roxbury Latin School. He graduated from Harvard University with a BA and MD.

After sports retired, initially he practiced as a doctor in Chicago and was later commissioned into the 1st Illinois Field Hospital Company and served in France in 1918. After the war he tried to resume his Chicago practice, but soon returned to France as a surgeon with the foreign service of the U.S. Public Health Service, and he served overseas for many years. He finally settled in the small town of Berlin, New York, where he continued to practice medicine.

He died in Cambridge, New York on December 1, 1954.
