= List of multiple Olympic medalists in one event =

This is a list of Olympians who have won medals on numerous occasions in single events. Only Olympians with four or more medals in one event are included. If a person has contested for several nations, only the most recent nation is mentioned.

In those instances where two or more athletes have the same number of total medals, the first tiebreaker is the number of gold medals, followed by the number of silver medals. Where two or more athletes have exactly the same number of gold, silver and bronze medals, the ranking is shown as a tie and the athletes are shown in order by career years and name.

This list includes top-three placings in 1896 and 1900, even though these Games pre-dated the awarding of medals for top-three placings. Medals won in the 1906 Intercalated Games are not included.

== Individual events ==
| Rank | Athlete | Nation | Sex | Period | Games | Sport | Event | Gold medal | Silver medal | Bronze medal | Total |
|---|---|---|---|---|---|---|---|---|---|---|---|
| 1 | Isabell Werth* | Germany | F | 1992–2024 | Summer | Dressage | Individual dressage | 1 | 6 | - | 7 |
| 2 | Armin Zöggeler | Italy | M | 1994–2014 | Winter | Luge | Singles | 2 | 1 | 3 | 6 |
| 3 | Mijaín López | Cuba | M | 2008–2024 | Summer | Wrestling | Greco-Roman super heavyweight | 5 | — | — | 5 |
| 4 | Georg Hackl | West Germany; Germany | M | 1988–2002 | Winter | Luge | Singles | 3 | 2 | - | 5 |
| 4 | Ralf Schumann* | East Germany; Germany | M | 1988–2008 | Summer | Shooting | 25m rapid fire pistol | 3 | 2 | - | 5 |
| 6 | Claudia Pechstein | Germany | F | 1992–2006 | Winter | Speed skating | 5000m | 3 | 1 | 1 | 5 |
| 6 | Valentina Vezzali | Italy | F | 1996–2012 | Summer | Fencing | Individual foil | 3 | 1 | 1 | 5 |
| 6 | Ireen Wüst | Netherlands | F | 2006–2022 | Winter | Speed skating | 1500m | 3 | 1 | 1 | 5 |
| 9 | Teddy Riner | France | M | 2008–2024 | Summer | Judo | +100 kg | 3 | - | 2 | 5 |
| 10 | Ryoko Tani | Japan | F | 1992–2008 | Summer | Judo | 48 kg | 2 | 2 | 1 | 5 |
| 10 | Michal Martikán | Slovakia | M | 1996–2012 | Summer | Canoe Slalom | Canoe Slalom C-1 | 2 | 2 | 1 | 5 |
| 10 | Arianna Fontana | Italy | F | 2006–2022 | Winter | Short track speed skating | 500 m | 2 | 2 | 1 | 5 |
| 13 | Al Oerter | United States | M | 1956–1968 | Summer | Athletics | Discus throw | 4 | - | - | 4 |
| 13 | Carl Lewis | United States | M | 1984–1996 | Summer | Athletics | Long jump | 4 | - | - | 4 |
| 13 | Michael Phelps | United States | M | 2004–2016 | Summer | Swimming | 200m individual medley | 4 | - | - | 4 |
| 13 | Vincent Hancock* | United States | M | 2008–2024 | Summer | Shooting | Men's Skeet | 4 | - | - | 4 |
| 13 | Katie Ledecky | United States | F | 2012–2024 | Summer | Swimming | 800 m freestyle | 4 | - | - | 4 |
| 18 | Gillis Grafström | Sweden | M | 1920–1932 | Both | Figure skating | Singles | 3 | 1 | - | 4 |
| 18 | Natalie Geisenberger | Germany | F | 2010–2022 | Winter | Luge | Singles | 3 | 1 | - | 4 |
| 18 | Klaus Dibiasi | Italy | M | 1964–1976 | Summer | Diving | 10m platform | 3 | 1 | - | 4 |
| 18 | Viktor Saneyev | Soviet Union | M | 1968–1980 | Summer | Athletics | Triple jump | 3 | 1 | - | 4 |
| 18 | Alexander Karelin | Soviet Union; Unified Team; Russia | M | 1988–2000 | Summer | Wrestling | Greco-Roman 130 kg | 3 | 1 | - | 4 |
| 18 | Jan Železný | Czechoslovakia; Czech Republic | M | 1988–2000 | Summer | Athletics | Javelin throw | 3 | 1 | - | 4 |
| 18 | Anky van Grunsven | Netherlands | F | 1996–2008 | Summer | Equestrian | Individual dressage | 3 | 1 | - | 4 |
| 18 | Artur Taymazov | Uzbekistan | M | 2000–2012 | Summer | Wrestling | Freestyle 120 kg | 3 | 1 | - | 4 |
| 18 | Jin Jong-oh | South Korea | M | 2004–2016 | Summer | Shooting | 50 metre pistol | 3 | 1 | - | 4 |
| 18 | Michael Phelps | United States | M | 2004–2016 | Summer | Swimming | 100m butterfly | 3 | 1 | - | 4 |
| 18 | Michael Phelps | United States | M | 2004–2016 | Summer | Swimming | 200m butterfly | 3 | 1 | - | 4 |
| 18 | Saori Yoshida | Japan | F | 2004–2012 | Summer | Wrestling | Freestyle 53/55 kg | 3 | 1 | - | 4 |
| 18 | Sven Kramer | Netherlands | M | 2006–2018 | Winter | Speed skating | 5000m | 3 | 1 | - | 4 |
| 31 | Gert Fredriksson | Sweden | M | 1948–1960 | Summer | Canoeing | K-1 1000m | 3 | - | 1 | 4 |
| 31 | Pyrros Dimas | Greece | M | 1992–2004 | Summer | Weightlifting | 85 kg | 3 | - | 1 | 4 |
| 31 | Kjetil André Aamodt* | Norway | M | 1992–2006 | Winter | Alpine Skiing | Super-G | 3 | - | 1 | 4 |
| 34 | Wang Yifu | China | M | 1984–2004 | Summer | Shooting | 10m air pistol | 2 | 2 | - | 4 |
| 35 | Ekaterina Karsten | Belarus | F | 1996–2008 | Summer | Rowing | Single sculls | 2 | 1 | 1 | 4 |
| 35 | Daniel Morelon | France | M | 1964–1976 | Summer | Cycling | Individual sprint | 2 | 1 | 1 | 4 |
| 35 | Bruce Baumgartner | United States | M | 1984–1996 | Summer | Wrestling | Freestyle 130 kg | 2 | 1 | 1 | 4 |
| 35 | Shelly-Ann Fraser-Pryce | Jamaica | F | 2008–2020 | Summer | Athletics | 100 m | 2 | 1 | 1 | 4 |
| 35 | Volodymyr Holubnychy | Soviet Union | M | 1960–1976 | Summer | Athletics | 20 kilometers race walking | 2 | 1 | 1 | 4 |
| 35 | Valerie Adams | New Zealand | F | 2008–2020 | Summer | Athletics | Shot put | 2 | 1 | 1 | 4 |
| 35 | Marit Bouwmeester | Netherlands | F | 2012–2024 | Summer | Sailing | Laser Radial | 2 | 1 | 1 | 4 |
| 42 | Imre Polyák | Hungary | M | 1952–1964 | Summer | Wrestling | Greco-Roman 62 kg | 1 | 3 | - | 4 |
| 43 | Josefa Idem | West Germany; Italy | F | 1996–2008 | Summer | Canoeing | K1 500m | 1 | 2 | 1 | 4 |
| 43 | Idalys Ortiz | Cuba | F | 2008–2020 | Summer | Judo | +78 kg | 1 | 2 | 1 | 4 |
| 43 | Florent Manaudou | France | M | 2012–2024 | Summer | Swimming | 50m freestyle | 1 | 2 | 1 | 4 |
| 46 | Giovanna Trillini | Italy | F | 1992–2004 | Summer | Fencing | Individual foil | 1 | 1 | 2 | 4 |
| 46 | Bob de Jong | Netherlands | M | 1998–2014 | Winter | Speed skating | 10,000m | 1 | 1 | 2 | 4 |
| 48 | Giovanni Pellielo | Italy | M | 2000–2016 | Summer | Shooting | Trap | - | 3 | 1 | 4 |
| 49 | Merlene Ottey | Jamaica | F | 1980–1996 | Summer | Athletics | 200m | - | 1 | 3 | 4 |

=== Notes ===
- *Non-consecutive medals

== Team events ==
| Rank | Athlete | Nation | Sex | Period | Games | Sport | Event | Gold medal | Silver medal | Bronze medal | Total |
|---|---|---|---|---|---|---|---|---|---|---|---|
| 1 | Isabell Werth | Germany | F | 1992-2024 | Summer | Equestrian | Team dressage | 7 | - | - | 7 |
| 2 | Aladár Gerevich | Hungary | M | 1932–1960 | Summer | Fencing | Team sabre | 6 | - | - | 6 |
| 2 | Diana Taurasi | United States | F | 2004–2024 | Summer | Basketball | Team | 6 | - | - | 6 |
| 4 | Hans Günter Winkler | West Germany | M | 1956–1976 | Summer | Equestrian | Team jumping | 4 | 1 | 1 | 6 |
| 5 | Pál Kovács | Hungary | M | 1936–1960 | Summer | Fencing | Team sabre | 5 | - | - | 5 |
| 5 | Reiner Klimke | West Germany | M | 1964–1988 | Summer | Equestrian | Team dressage | 5 | - | - | 5 |
| 5 | Sue Bird | United States | F | 2004–2020 | Summer | Basketball | Team | 5 | - | - | 5 |
| 8 | Edoardo Mangiarotti | Italy | M | 1936–1960 | Summer | Fencing | Team épée | 4 | 1 | - | 5 |
| 8 | Birgit Fischer | Germany | F | 1980–2004 | Summer | Canoeing | K-4 500m | 4 | 1 | - | 5 |
| 8 | Ricco Groß | Germany | M | 1992–2006 | Winter | Biathlon | 4 × 7.5 km relay | 4 | 1 | - | 5 |
| 8 | Jayna Hefford | Canada | F | 1998–2014 | Winter | Ice hockey | Team | 4 | 1 | - | 5 |
| 8 | Hayley Wickenheiser | Canada | F | 1998–2014 | Winter | Ice hockey | Team | 4 | 1 | - | 5 |
| 13 | Teresa Edwards | United States | F | 1984–2000 | Summer | Basketball | Team | 4 | - | 1 | 5 |
| 14 | Dezső Gyarmati | Hungary | M | 1948–1964 | Summer | Water polo | Team | 3 | 1 | 1 | 5 |
| 14 | Dara Torres | United States | F | 1984–2008 | Summer | Swimming | 4 × 100m freestyle relay | 3 | 1 | 1 | 5 |
| 14 | Elena Georgescu | Romania | F | 1992–2008 | Summer | Rowing | Eight | 3 | 1 | 1 | 5 |
| 17 | Eskild Ebbesen | Denmark | M | 1996–2012 | Summer | Rowing | Lightweight coxless four | 3 | - | 2 | 5 |
| 17 | Katrine Lunde | Norway | F | 2008–2024 | Summer | Handball | Team | 3 | - | 2 | 5 |
| 19 | Michael Plumb | United States | M | 1964–1984 | Summer | Equestrian | Team eventing | 2 | 3 | - | 5 |
| 20 | Ildikó Rejtő | Hungary | F | 1960–1976 | Summer | Fencing | Team foil | 1 | 3 | 1 | 5 |
| 21 | Lauren Jackson | Australia | F | 2000–2024 | Summer | Basketball | Team | - | 3 | 2 | 5 |
| 22 | Anky van Grunsven | Netherlands | M | 1992–2012 | Summer | Equestrian | Team dressage | - | 4 | 1 | 5 |
| 23 | Harri Kirvesniemi | Finland | M | 1980–1998 | Winter | Cross-country skiing | 4 × 10 km | - | - | 5 | 5 |
| 24 | Rudolf Kárpáti | Hungary | M | 1948–1960 | Summer | Fencing | Team sabre | 4 | - | - | 4 |
| 24 | Alexander Tikhonov | Soviet Union | M | 1968–1980 | Winter | Biathlon | 4 × 7.5 km relay | 4 | - | - | 4 |
| 24 | Lisa Leslie | United States | F | 1996–2008 | Summer | Basketball | Team | 4 | - | - | 4 |
| 24 | Caroline Ouellette | Canada | F | 2002–2014 | Winter | Ice hockey | Team | 4 | - | - | 4 |
| 24 | Wu Minxia | China | F | 2004–2016 | Summer | Diving | Synchronised 3m springboard | 4 | - | - | 4 |
| 24 | Ryan Lochte | United States | M | 2004–2016 | Summer | Swimming | 4 × 200m freestyle relay | 4 | - | - | 4 |
| 24 | Michael Phelps | United States | M | 2004–2016 | Summer | Swimming | 4 × 200m freestyle relay | 4 | - | - | 4 |
| 24 | Michael Phelps | United States | M | 2004–2016 | Summer | Swimming | 4 × 100m medley relay | 4 | - | - | 4 |
| 24 | Tamika Catchings | United States | F | 2004–2016 | Summer | Basketball | Team | 4 | - | - | 4 |
| 24 | Svetlana Romashina | Russia; ROC | F | 2008–2020 | Summer | Synchronized swimming | Team | 4 | - | - | 4 |
| 24 | Allyson Felix | United States | F | 2008-2020 | Summer | Athletics | 4x400m relay | 4 | - | - | 4 |
| 24 | Kevin Durant | United States | M | 2012-2024 | Summer | Basketball | Team | 4 | - | - | 4 |
| 36 | Leslie Claudius | India | M | 1948–1960 | Summer | Field hockey | Team | 3 | 1 | - | 4 |
| 36 | Udham Singh | India | M | 1948–1960 | Summer | Field hockey | Team | 3 | 1 | - | 4 |
| 36 | Giuseppe Delfino | Italy | M | 1952–1964 | Summer | Fencing | Team épée | 3 | 1 | - | 4 |
| 36 | Galina Gorokhova | Soviet Union | F | 1960–1972 | Summer | Fencing | Team foil | 3 | 1 | - | 4 |
| 36 | Vladislav Tretiak | Soviet Union | M | 1972–1984 | Winter | Ice hockey | Team | 3 | 1 | - | 4 |
| 36 | Viktor Sidyak | Soviet Union | M | 1968–1980 | Summer | Fencing | Team sabre | 3 | 1 | - | 4 |
| 36 | Ivan Patzaichin | Romania | M | 1968–1984 | Summer | Canoeing | C-2 1000m | 3 | 1 | - | 4 |
| 36 | Jenny Thompson | United States | F | 1992–2004 | Summer | Swimming | 4 × 100m freestyle relay | 3 | 1 | - | 4 |
| 36 | Andrew Hoy | Australia | M | 1992–2020 | Summer | Equestrian | Team eventing | 3 | 1 | - | 4 |
| 36 | Sven Fischer | Germany | M | 1994–2006 | Winter | Biathlon | 4 × 7.5 km relay | 3 | 1 | - | 4 |
| 36 | Christie Rampone | United States | F | 2000–2012 | Summer | Football | Team | 3 | 1 | - | 4 |
| 36 | Bradley Wiggins | Great Britain | M | 2000–2016 | Summer | Cycling | Team pursuit | 3 | 1 | - | 4 |
| 36 | Jason Kenny | Great Britain | M | 2008–2020 | Summer | Cycling | Team sprint | 3 | 1 | - | 4 |
| 36 | Eva de Goede | Netherlands | F | 2008–2020 | Summer | Field hockey | Team | 3 | 1 | - | 4 |
| 36 | Luc Abalo | France | M | 2008–2020 | Summer | Handball | Team | 3 | 1 | - | 4 |
| 36 | Michaël Guigou | France | M | 2008–2020 | Summer | Handball | Team | 3 | 1 | - | 4 |
| 36 | Nikola Karabatić | France | M | 2008–2020 | Summer | Handball | Team | 3 | 1 | - | 4 |
| 53 | György Kárpáti | Hungary | M | 1952–1964 | Summer | Water polo | Team | 3 | - | 1 | 4 |
| 53 | Andrey Lavrov | Russia | M | 1988–2004 | Summer | Handball | Team | 3 | - | 1 | 4 |
| 53 | Ana Fernández | Cuba | F | 1992–2004 | Summer | Volleyball | Team | 3 | - | 1 | 4 |
| 53 | Stanislav Pozdnyakov | Russia | M | 1992–2004 | Summer | Fencing | Team sabre | 3 | - | 1 | 4 |
| 53 | Jenny Thompson | United States | F | 1992–2004 | Summer | Swimming | 4 × 100m medley relay | 3 | - | 1 | 4 |
| 53 | Giovanna Trillini | Italy | F | 1992–2008 | Summer | Fencing | Team foil | 3 | - | 1 | 4 |
| 53 | Valentina Vezzali | Italy | F | 1996–2012 | Summer | Fencing | Team foil | 3 | - | 1 | 4 |
| 53 | Pavol Hochschorner | Slovakia | M | 2000–2012 | Summer | Canoe Slalom | Canoe slalom C-2 | 3 | - | 1 | 4 |
| 53 | Peter Hochschorner | Slovakia | M | 2000–2012 | Summer | Canoe Slalom | Canoe slalom C-2 | 3 | - | 1 | 4 |
| 53 | Cate Campbell | Australia | F | 2008–2020 | Summer | Swimming | 4 × 100m freestyle relay | 3 | - | 1 | 4 |
| 53 | LeBron James | United States | M | 2004-2024 | Summer | Basketball | Team | 3 | - | 1 | 4 |
| 64 | Alfred Swahn | Sweden | M | 1908–1924 | Summer | Shooting | Team | 2 | 2 | - | 4 |
| 64 | Philippe Cattiau | France | M | 1920–1932 | Summer | Fencing | Team foil | 2 | 2 | - | 4 |
| 64 | Inna Ryskal | Soviet Union | F | 1964–1976 | Summer | Volleyball | Team | 2 | 2 | - | 4 |
| 64 | Birgit Fischer | Germany | F | 1980–2004 | Summer | Canoeing | K-2 500m | 2 | 2 | - | 4 |
| 64 | Teun de Nooijer | Netherlands | M | 1996–2012 | Summer | Field hockey | Team | 2 | 2 | - | 4 |
| 64 | Leisel Jones | Australia | F | 2000–2012 | Summer | Swimming | 4 × 100m medley relay | 2 | 2 | - | 4 |
| 64 | Katalin Kovács | Hungary | F | 2000–2012 | Summer | Canoeing | K-2 500m | 2 | 2 | - | 4 |
| 64 | Emily Seebohm | Australia | F | 2008–2020 | Summer | Swimming | 4 × 100m medley relay | 2 | 2 | - | 4 |
| 72 | László Jeney | Hungary | M | 1948–1960 | Summer | Water polo | Team | 2 | 1 | 1 | 4 |
| 72 | Ole Einar Bjørndalen | Norway | M | 1998–2014 | Winter | Biathlon | 4 × 7.5 km relay | 2 | 1 | 1 | 4 |
| 72 | Michael Phelps | United States | M | 2004–2016 | Summer | Swimming | 4 × 100m freestyle relay | 2 | 1 | 1 | 4 |
| 75 | Mihály Mayer | Hungary | M | 1956–1968 | Summer | Water polo | Team | 2 | - | 2 | 4 |
| 75 | Torben Grael | Brazil | M | 1988–2008 | Summer | Sailing | Star-class | 2 | - | 2 | 4 |
| 75 | Mario Stecher | Austria | M | 2002–2014 | Winter | Nordic combined | 4 × 5 km relay | 2 | - | 2 | 4 |
| 75 | Marit Malm Frafjord | Norway | F | 2008–2020 | Summer | Handball | Team | 2 | - | 2 | 4 |
| 75 | Camilla Herrem | Norway | F | 2012–2024 | Summer | Handball | Team | 2 | - | 2 | 4 |
| 80 | Edoardo Mangiarotti | Italy | M | 1936–1960 | Summer | Fencing | Team foil | 1 | 3 | - | 4 |
| 80 | Bogdan Musioł | Germany | M | 1980–1992 | Winter | Bobsleigh | 4 man | 1 | 3 | - | 4 |
| 80 | Katalin Kovács | Hungary | F | 2000–2012 | Summer | Canoeing | K-4 500m | 1 | 3 | - | 4 |
| 80 | Veronica Campbell Brown | Jamaica | F | 2000-2016 | Summer | Athletics | 4x100m relay | 1 | 3 | - | 4 |
| 84 | Gennadi Volnov | Soviet Union | M | 1960–1972 | Summer | Basketball | Team | 1 | 2 | 1 | 4 |
| 84 | Oh Seong-ok | South Korea | F | 1992–2008 | Summer | Handball | Team | 1 | 2 | 1 | 4 |
| 84 | Angela Ruggiero | United States | F | 1998–2010 | Winter | Ice hockey | Team | 1 | 2 | 1 | 4 |
| 84 | Jason Lezak | United States | M | 2000–2012 | Summer | Swimming | 4 × 100m freestyle relay | 1 | 2 | 1 | 4 |
| 84 | Heather Petri | United States | F | 2000–2012 | Summer | Water polo | Team | 1 | 2 | 1 | 4 |
| 84 | Brenda Villa | United States | F | 2000–2012 | Summer | Water polo | Team | 1 | 2 | 1 | 4 |
| 84 | Carl Hester | Great Britain | M | 2012–2024 | Summer | Equestrian | Team dressage | 1 | 2 | 1 | 4 |
| 91 | András Bodnár | Hungary | M | 1960–1972 | Summer | Water polo | Team | 1 | 1 | 2 | 4 |
| 91 | Endre Molnár | Hungary | M | 1968–1980 | Summer | Water polo | Team | 1 | 1 | 2 | 4 |
| 91 | István Szívós | Hungary | M | 1968–1980 | Summer | Water polo | Team | 1 | 1 | 2 | 4 |
| 91 | Sergey Tetyukhin | Russia | M | 2000–2016 | Summer | Volleyball | Team | 1 | 1 | 2 | 4 |
| 95 | Sergei Belov | Soviet Union | M | 1968–1980 | Summer | Basketball | Team | 1 | - | 3 | 4 |
| 95 | Sven Kramer | Netherlands | M | 2006–2018 | Winter | Speed skating | Team pursuit | 1 | - | 3 | 4 |
| 97 | Joseph Pletinckx | Belgium | M | 1908–1924 | Summer | Water polo | Team | - | 3 | 1 | 4 |
| 97 | Julie Chu | United States | F | 2002–2014 | Winter | Ice hockey | Team | - | 3 | 1 | 4 |
| 97 | Kristi Harrower | Australia | F | 2000–2012 | Summer | Basketball | Team | - | 3 | 1 | 4 |
| 97 | Björn Kircheisen | Germany | M | 2002–2014 | Winter | Nordic combined | 4 × 5 km relay | - | 3 | 1 | 4 |
| 97 | Novlene Williams-Mills | Jamaica | F | 2004-2016 | Summer | Athletics | 4x400m relay | - | 3 | 1 | 4 |
| 102 | Aldo Montano | Italy | M | 2004–2020 | Summer | Fencing | Team sabre | - | 2 | 2 | 4 |

== See also ==
- List of multiple Olympic medalists
- List of multiple Olympic medalists at a single Games
- List of multiple Olympic gold medalists
- List of multiple Olympic gold medalists at a single Games
- List of multiple Olympic gold medalists in one event
- List of multiple Summer Olympic medalists
- List of multiple Winter Olympic medalists
- List of athletes with the most appearances at Olympic Games
- All-time Olympic Games medal table
