= List of flag bearers for Germany at the Olympics =

Germany at the Olympics
- IOC code: GER
- NOC: German Olympic Sports Confederation
- Website: www.dosb.de (in German, English, and French)
- Medals: Gold 317 Silver 318 Bronze 320 Total 955

Summer appearances
- 1896; 1900; 1904; 1908; 1912; 1920–1924; 1928; 1932; 1936; 1948; 1952; 1956–1988; 1992; 1996; 2000; 2004; 2008; 2012; 2016; 2020; 2024

Winter appearances
- 1928; 1932; 1936; 1948; 1952; 1956–1988; 1992; 1994; 1998; 2002; 2006; 2010; 2014; 2018; 2022; 2026

Other related appearances
- 1906 Intercalated Games –––– Saar (1952); United Team of Germany (1956–1964); East Germany (1968–1988); West Germany (1968–1988)

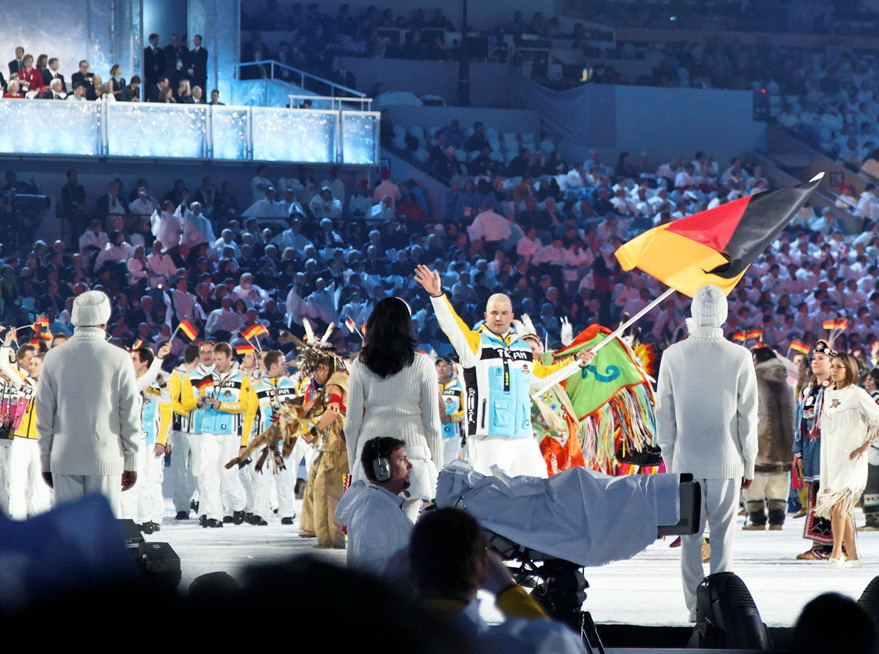
André Lange, 2010 Winter Olympics national flag bearers

This is a list of flag bearers who have represented Germany at the Olympics.

Flag bearers carry the national flag of their country at the opening ceremony of the Olympic Games.

#	Event year	Season	Flag bearer	Sport
1	1906	Summer	Georg Hax	Gymnastics
2	1908	Summer	Wilhelm Kaufmann	Gymnastics
3	1912	Summer	Karl von Halt	Athletics
4	1928	Winter	Karl Neuner	Nordic combined
5	1928	Summer	Ernst Paulus	Discus throw
6	1932	Winter	Martin Schröttle	Ice hockey
7	1932	Summer	Georg Gehring	Wrestling
8	1936	Winter	Georg von Kaufmann	Cross-country skiing
9	1936	Summer	Hans Fritsch	Discus throw
10	1952	Winter	Helmut Böck	Cross-country skiing
11	1952	Summer	Friedel Schirmer	Decathlon
12	1956	Winter	Andreas Ostler	Bobsleigh
13	1956	Summer	Karl-Friedrich Haas	Athletics
14	1960	Winter	Helmut Recknagel	Ski jumping
15	1960	Summer	Fritz Thiedemann	Equestrianism
16	1964	Winter	Georg Thoma	Nordic combined
17	1964	Summer	Ingrid Krämer	Diving
For the period between 1968 and 1988, see East Germany and West Germany
18	1992	Winter	Wolfgang Hoppe	Bobsleigh
19	1992	Summer	Manfred Klein	Rowing
20	1994	Winter	Mark Kirchner	Biathlon
21	1996	Summer	Arnd Schmitt	Fencing
22	1998	Winter	Jochen Behle	Cross-country skiing
23	2000	Summer	Birgit Fischer	Canoeing
24	2002	Winter	Hilde Gerg	Alpine skiing
25	2004	Summer	Ludger Beerbaum	Equestrianism
26	2006	Winter	Kati Wilhelm	Biathlon
27	2008	Summer	Dirk Nowitzki	Basketball
28	2010	Winter	André Lange	Bobsleigh
29	2012	Summer	Natascha Keller	Field hockey
30	2014	Winter	Maria Höfl-Riesch	Alpine skiing
31	2016	Summer	Timo Boll	Table tennis
32	2018	Winter	Eric Frenzel	Nordic combined
33	2020	Summer	Patrick Hausding	Diving
33	2020	Summer	Laura Ludwig	Beach volleyball
34	2022	Winter	Francesco Friedrich	Bobsleigh
34	2022	Winter	Claudia Pechstein	Speed skating
35	2024	Summer	Dennis Schröder	Basketball
35	2024	Summer	Anna-Maria Wagner	Judo

== See also ==
- Germany at the Olympics
- List of flag bearers for East Germany at the Olympics
- List of flag bearers for West Germany at the Olympics
