= List of flag bearers for West Germany at the Olympics =

West Germany at the Olympics
- Flag of Germany
- IOC code: FRG
- Medals: Gold 67 Silver 82 Bronze 94 Total 243

Summer appearances
- 1968; 1972; 1976; 1980; 1984; 1988

Winter appearances
- 1968; 1972; 1976; 1980; 1984; 1988

Other related appearances
- Germany (1896–1936, 1952, 1992–pres.); Saar (1952); United Team of Germany (1956–1964)

This is a list of flag bearers who have represented West Germany at the Olympics.

Flag bearers carry the national flag of their country at the opening ceremony of the Olympic Games.

#	Event year	Season	Flag bearer	Sport
1	1968	Winter	Hans Plenk	Luge
2	1968	Summer	Wilfried Dietrich	Wrestling
3	1972	Winter	Walter Demel	Cross-country skiing
4	1972	Summer	Detlef Lewe	Sprint canoe
5	1976	Winter	Wolfgang Zimmerer	Bobsleigh
6	1976	Summer	Hans Günter Winkler	Show jumping
7	1980	Winter	Urban Hettich	Nordic combined
8	1984	Winter	Monika Gawenus-Holzner-Pflug	Speed skating
9	1984	Summer	Willi Kuhweide	Sailing
10	1988	Winter	Peter Angerer	Biathlon
11	1988	Summer	Reiner Klimke	Dressage

== See also ==
- West Germany at the Olympics
- List of flag bearers for Germany at the Olympics
- List of flag bearers for East Germany at the Olympics
