= List of flag bearers for East Germany at the Olympics =

East Germany at the Olympics
- IOC code: GDR
- NOC: National Olympic Committee of the GDR
- Medals: Gold 192 Silver 165 Bronze 162 Total 519

Summer appearances
- 1968; 1972; 1976; 1980; 1984; 1988

Winter appearances
- 1968; 1972; 1976; 1980; 1984; 1988

Other related appearances
- Germany (1896–1936, 1992–); United Team of Germany (1956–1964)

This is a list of flag bearers who have represented East Germany at the Olympics.

Flag bearers carry the national flag of their country at the opening ceremony of the Olympic Games.

#	Event year	Season	Flag bearer	Sport
1	1968	Winter	Thomas Köhler	Luge
2	1968	Summer	Karin Balzer	Athletics (track and field)
3	1972	Winter	Klaus Bonsack	Luge
4	1972	Summer	Manfred Wolke	Boxing
5	1976	Winter	Meinhard Nehmer	Bobsleigh
6	1976	Summer	Hans-Georg Reimann	Athletics (track and field)
7	1980	Winter	Jan Hoffmann	Figure skating
8	1980	Summer	Kristina Richter	Handball
9	1984	Winter	Frank Ullrich	Biathlon
10	1988	Winter	Frank-Peter Roetsch	Biathlon
11	1988	Summer	Ulf Timmermann	Athletics (track and field)

== See also ==
- East Germany at the Olympics
- List of flag bearers for Germany at the Olympics
- List of flag bearers for West Germany at the Olympics
