= List of Olympic venues in judo =

For the Summer Olympics, there are 15 venues that have been or will be used for judo.

Games	Venue	Other sports hosted at venue for those games	Capacity	Ref.
1964 Tokyo	Nippon Budokan	None	14,100	
1972 Munich	Basketballhalle	Basketball	6,635	
1972 Munich	Boxhalle (final)	Boxing	7,360	
1972 Munich	Messegelände, Judo- und Ringerhalle	Wrestling	5,750	
1976 Montreal	Olympic Velodrome	Cycling (track)	2,600	
1980 Moscow	Sports Palace	Gymnastics	11,500	
1984 Los Angeles	Eagle's Nest Arena	None	4,200	
1988 Seoul	Jangchung Gymnasium	Taekwondo (demonstration)	7,000	
1992 Barcelona	Palau Blaugrana	Roller hockey (demonstration final), Taekwondo (demonstration)	6,400	
1996 Atlanta	Georgia World Congress Center	Fencing, Handball, Modern pentathlon (fencing, shooting), Table tennis, Weightlifting, Wrestling	3,900 (fencing); 7,300 (handball); 7,300 (judo); 4,700 (table tennis); 5,000 (weightlifting); 7,300 (wrestling)	
2000 Sydney	Sydney Convention and Exhibition Centre	Boxing, Fencing, Weightlifting, Wrestling	7,500 (weightlifting), 9,000 (judo & wrestling), 10,000 (boxing & fencing)	
2004 Athens	Ano Liosia Olympic Hall	Wrestling	10,000	
2008 Beijing	Beijing Science and Technology University Gymnasium	Taekwondo	8,024	
2012 London	ExCeL	Boxing, Fencing, Table tennis, Taekwondo, Weightlifting, Wrestling	Not listed.	
2016 Rio de Janeiro	Carioca Arena 2	Wrestling	10,000	
2020 Tokyo	Nippon Budokan	Karate	11,000	
2024 Paris	Grand Palais Éphémère	Wrestling	8,000	
2028 Los Angeles	Los Angeles Convention Center	Fencing, Table tennis, Taekwondo, Wrestling	Not listed.	
2032 Brisbane	Gold Coast Sports and Leisure Centre	Wrestling	7,500	

== Gallery of venues ==
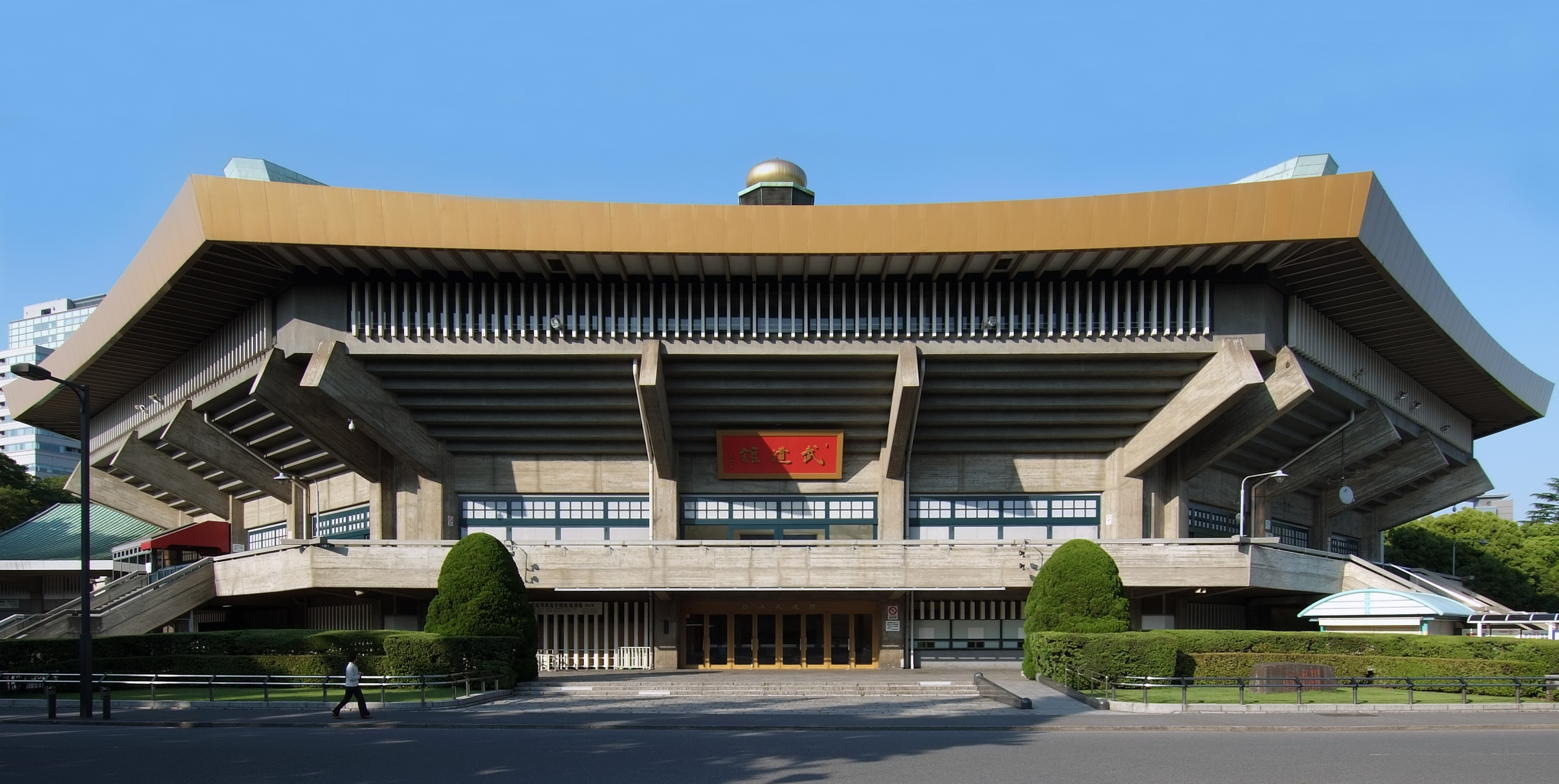
Nippon Budokan hosted the first Olympic judo events at the 1964 Summer Olympics in Tokyo. It hosted the judo events again when the Olympics returned to Tokyo in 2020.

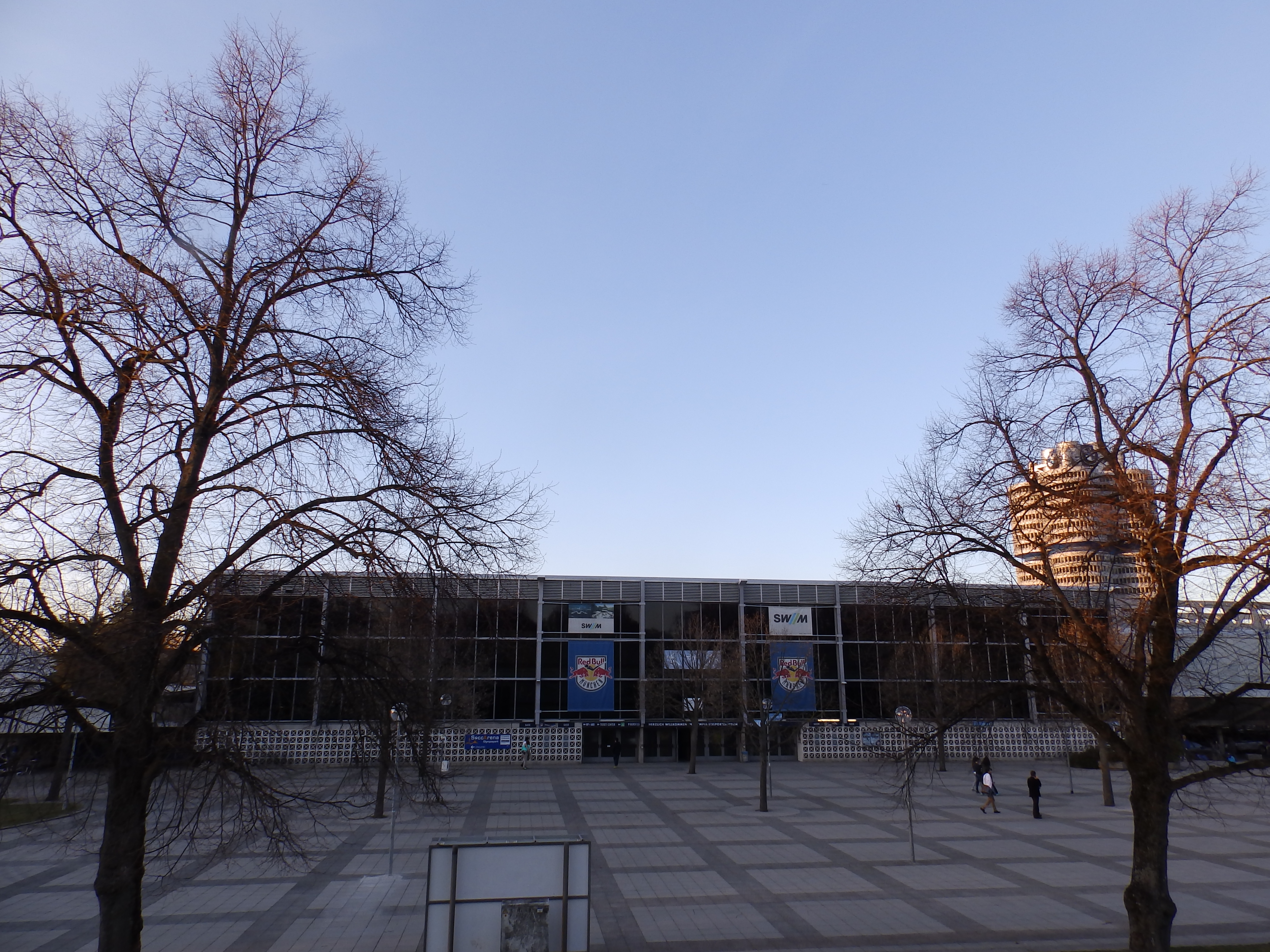
Olympia Eishalle hosted judo at the 1972 Summer Olympics in Munich.

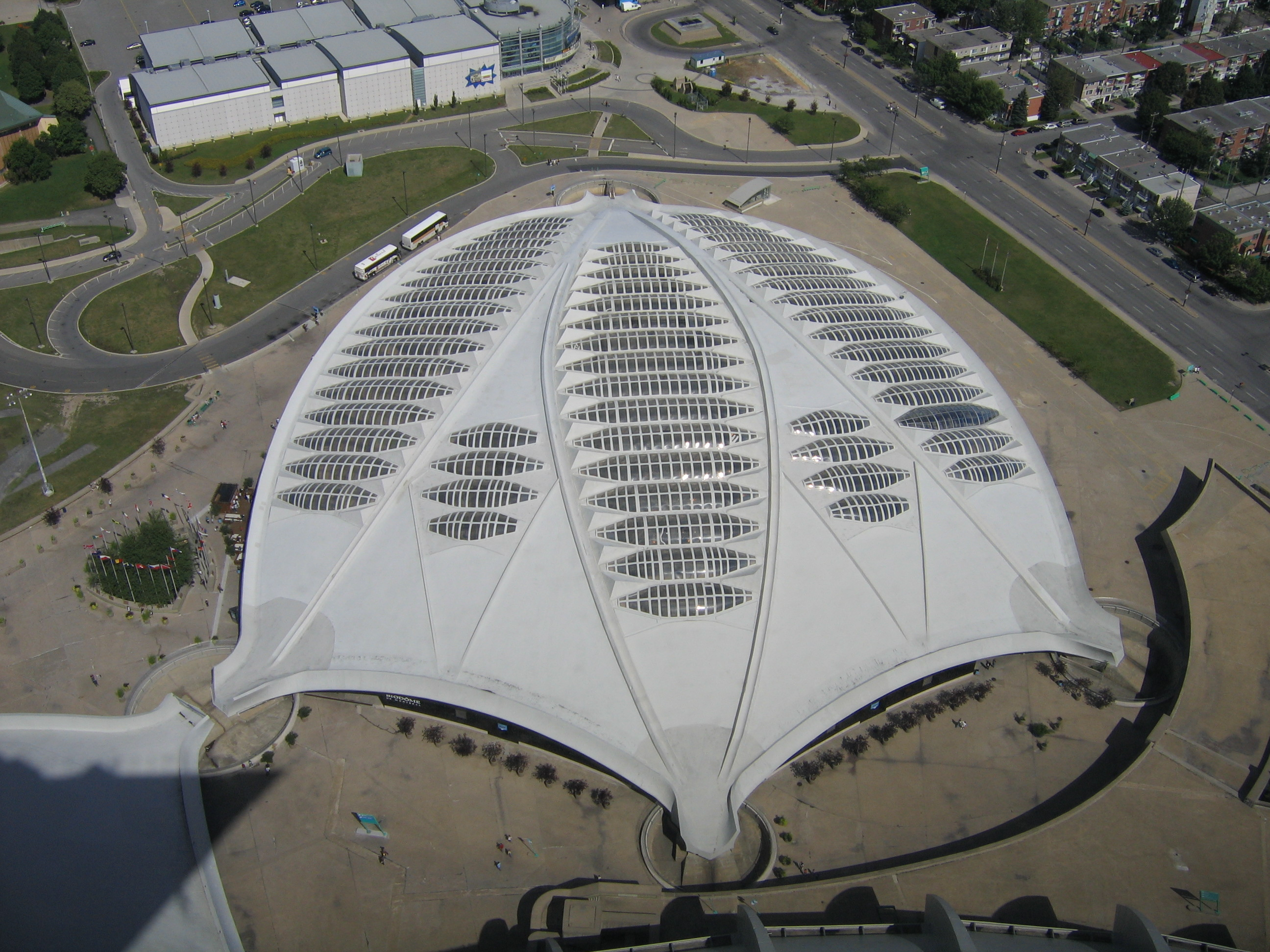
The Montreal Velodrome hosted judo at the 1976 Summer Olympics.

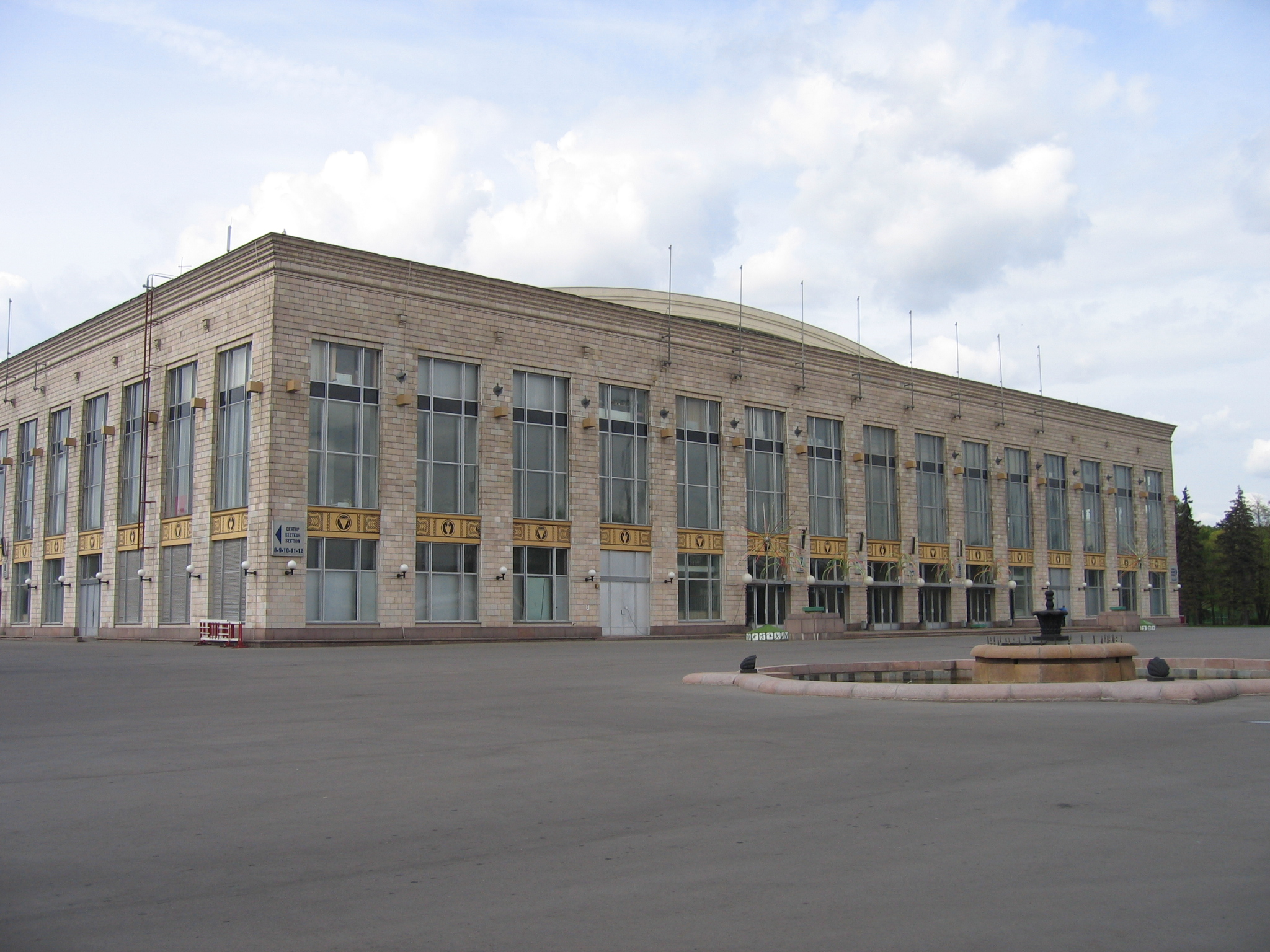
Luzhniki Palace of Sports hosted judo at the 1980 Summer Olympics in Moscow.

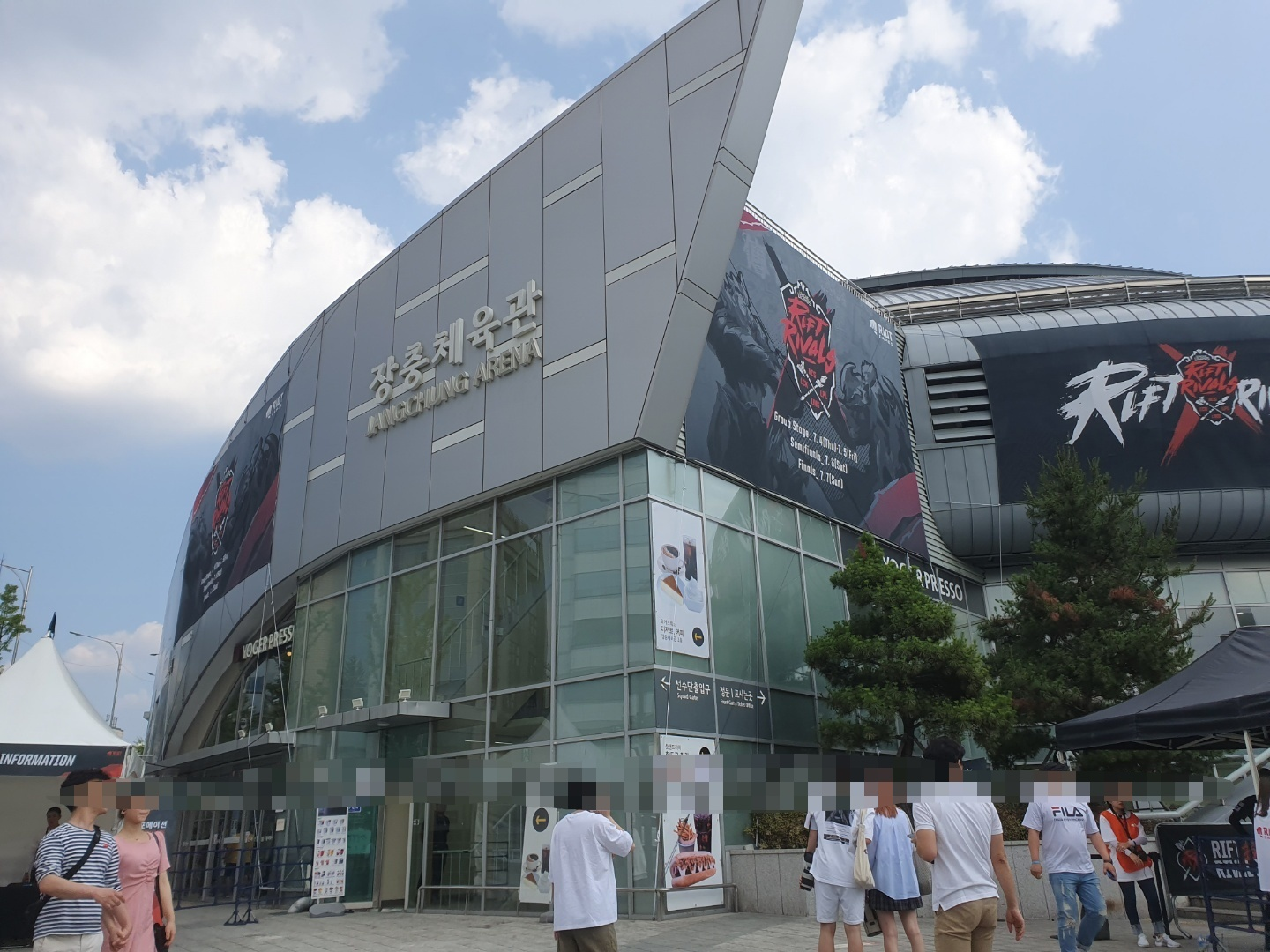
Jangchung Arena hosted judo at the 1988 Summer Olympics in Seoul.

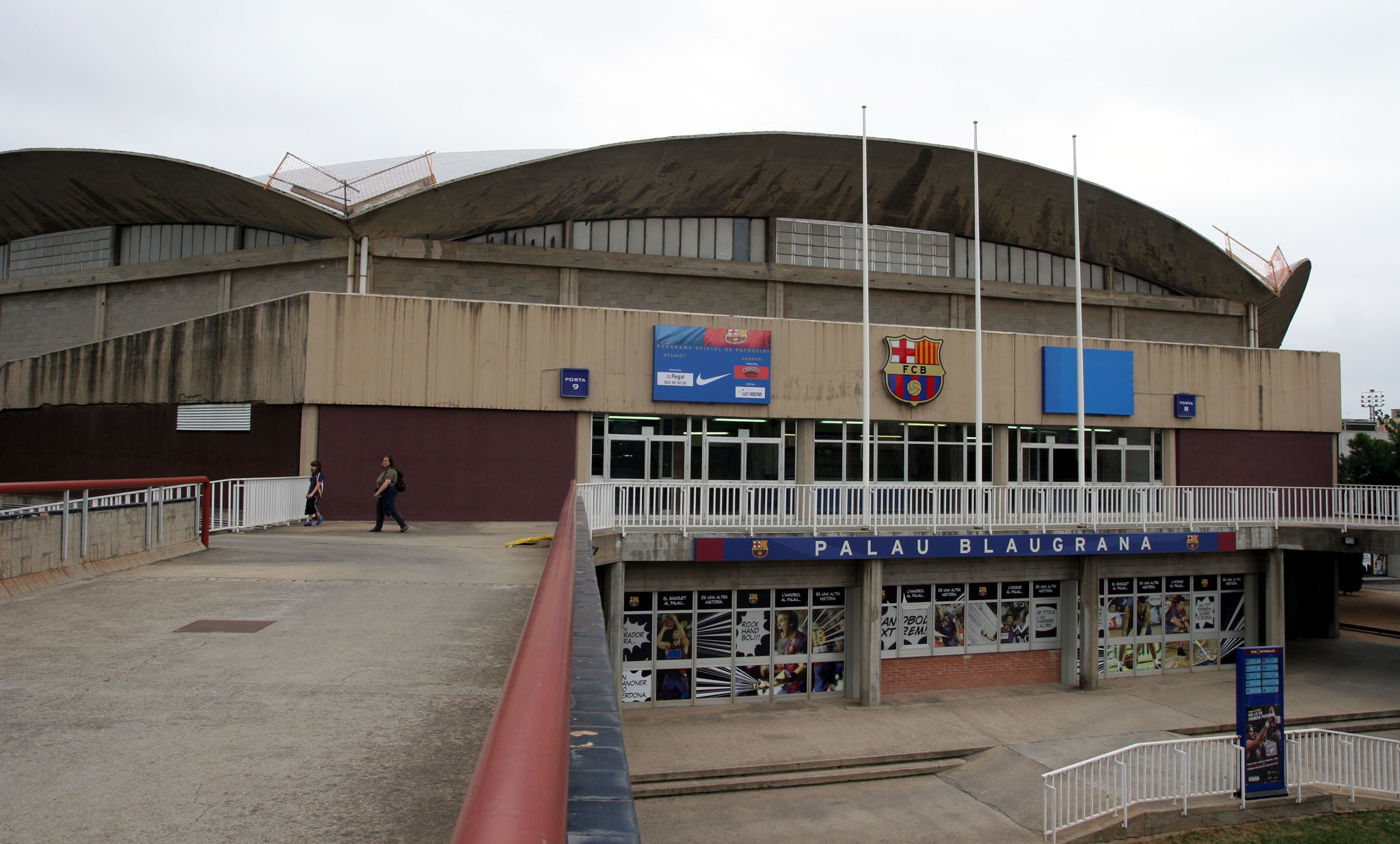
Palau Blaugrana hosted judo at the 1992 Summer Olympics in Barcelona.

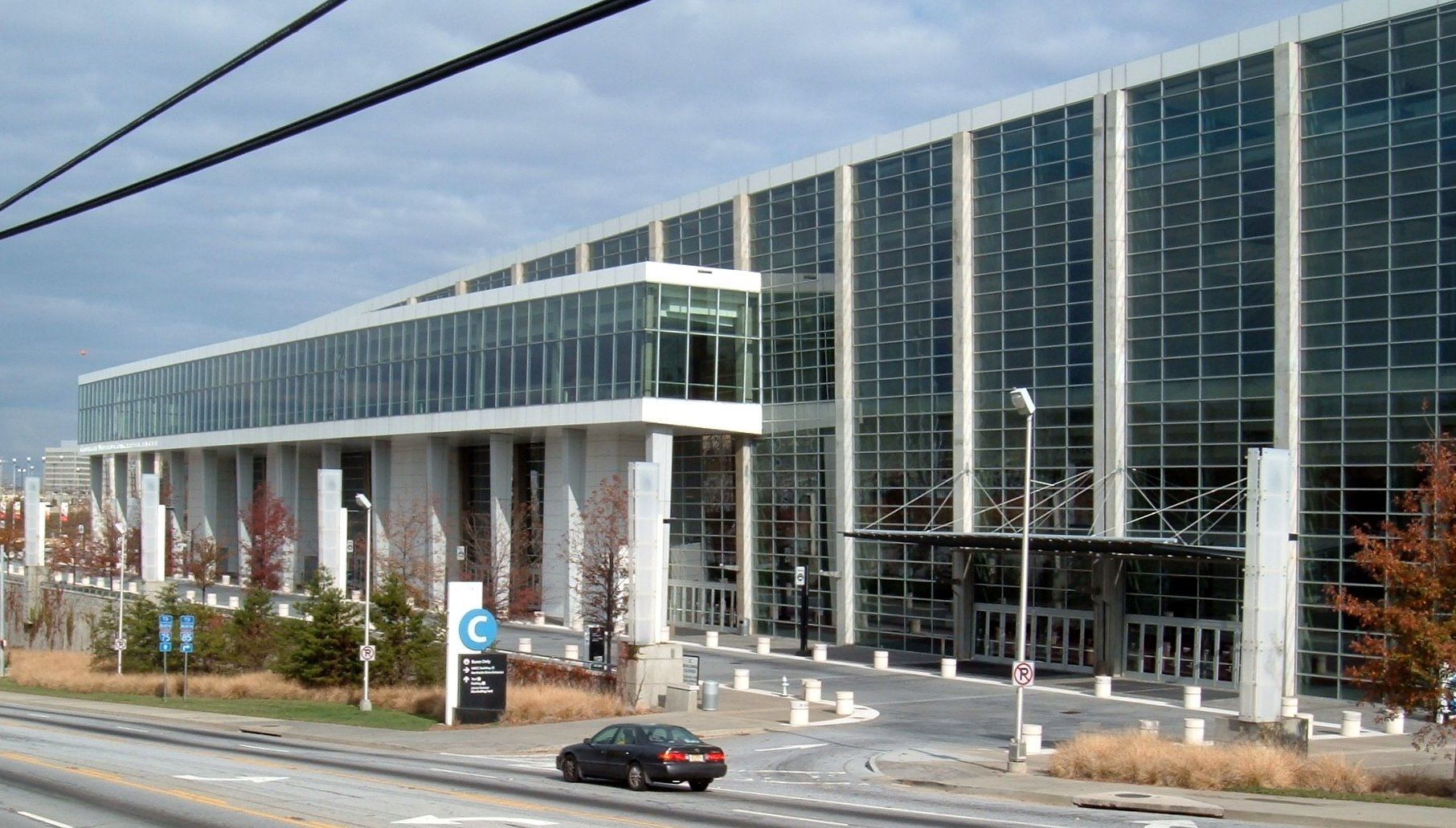
The Georgia World Congress Center hosted judo at the 1996 Summer Olympics in Atlanta.

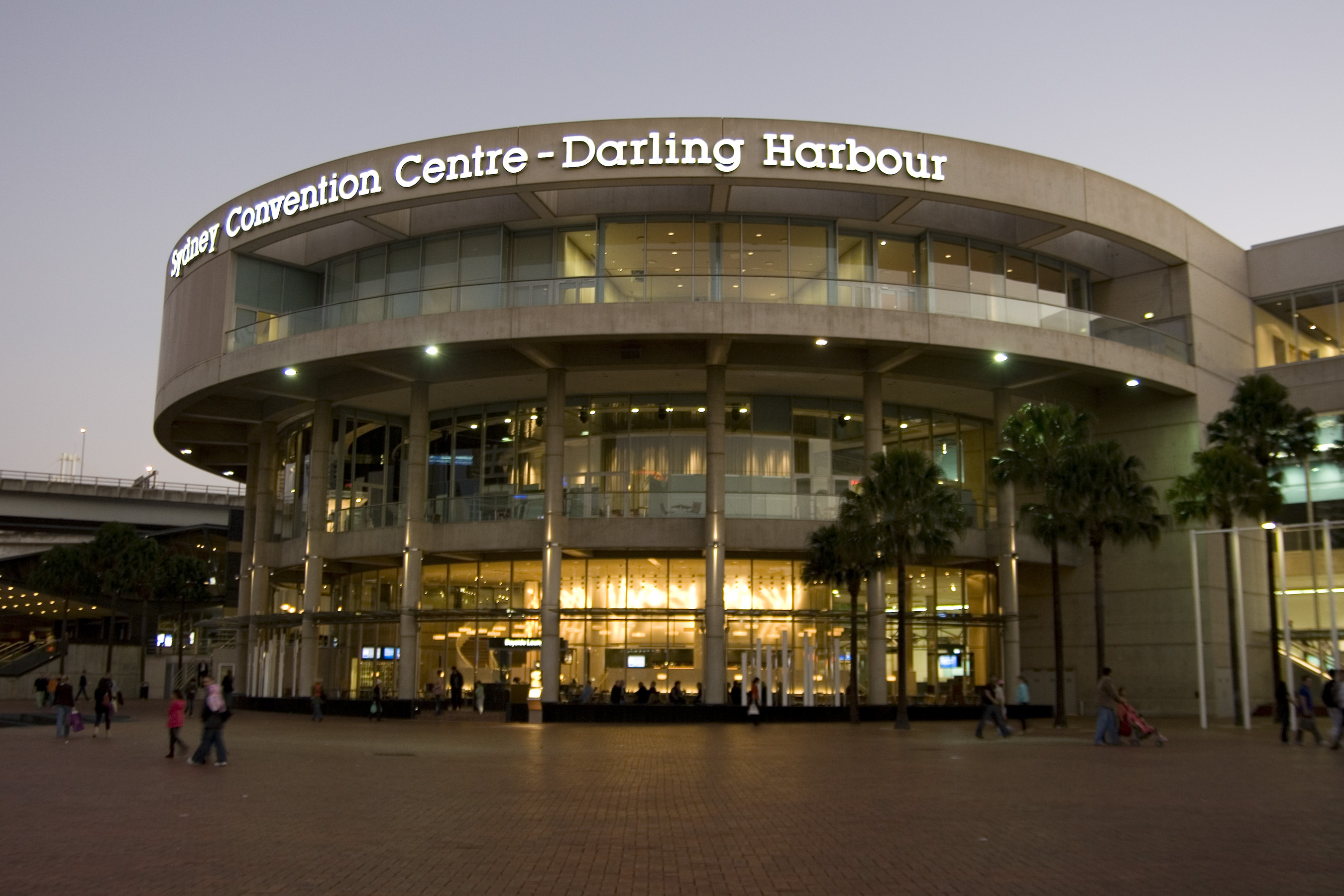
Sydney Convention and Exhibition Centre hosted judo at the 2000 Summer Olympics.

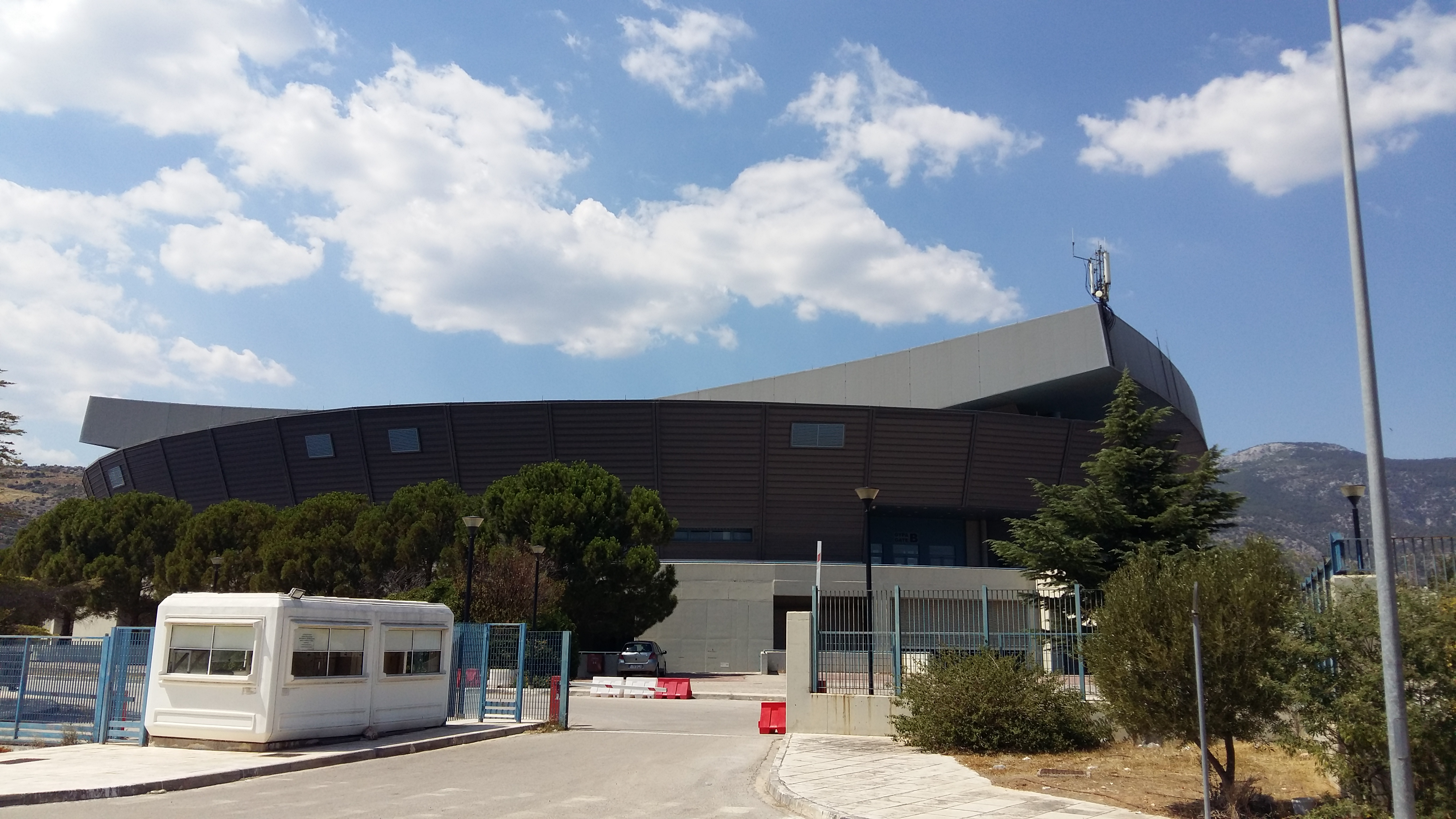
SUNEL Arena hosted judo at the 2004 Summer Olympics in Athens.

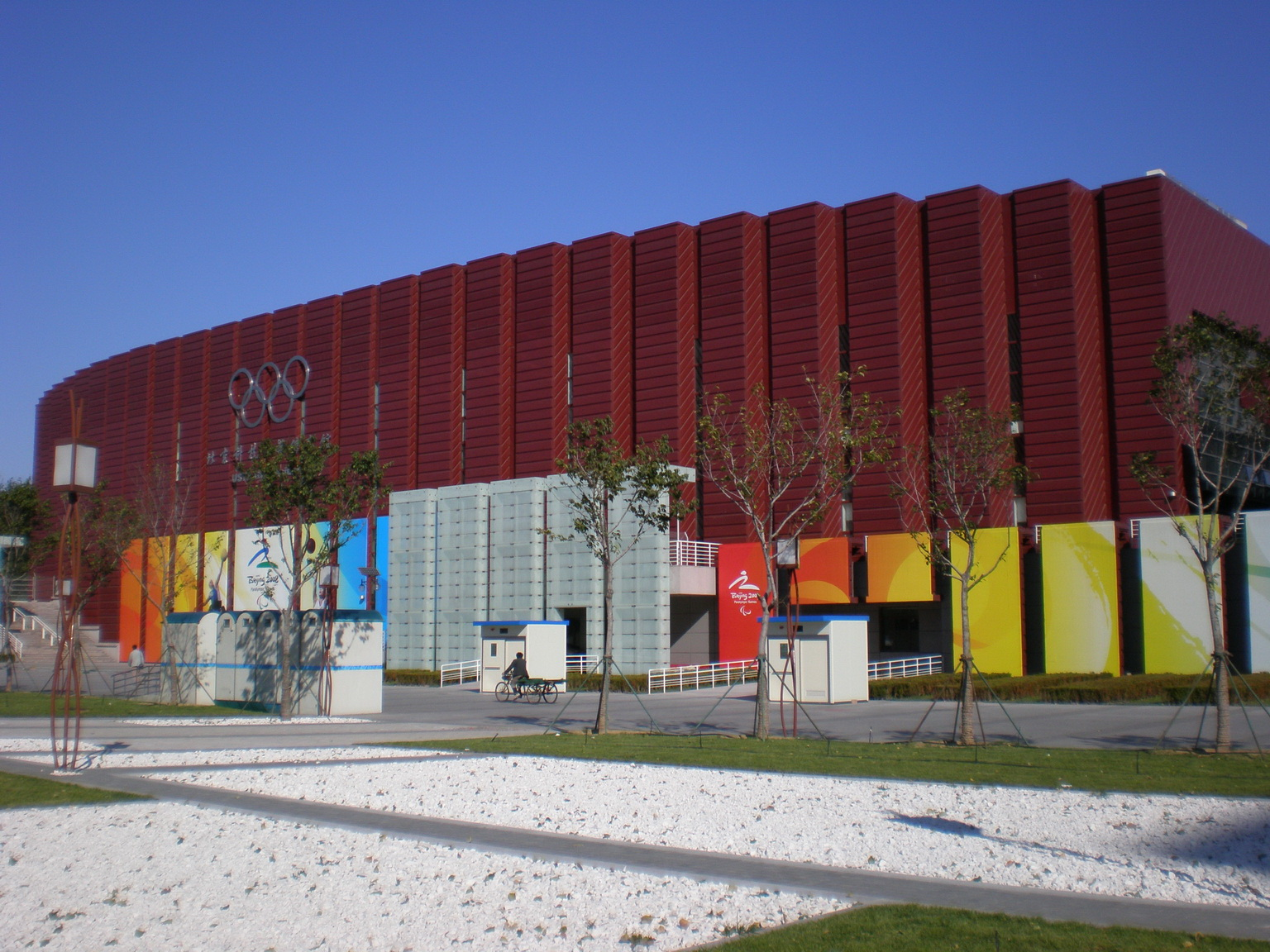
Beijing Science and Technology University Gymnasium hosted judo at the 2008 Summer Olympics.

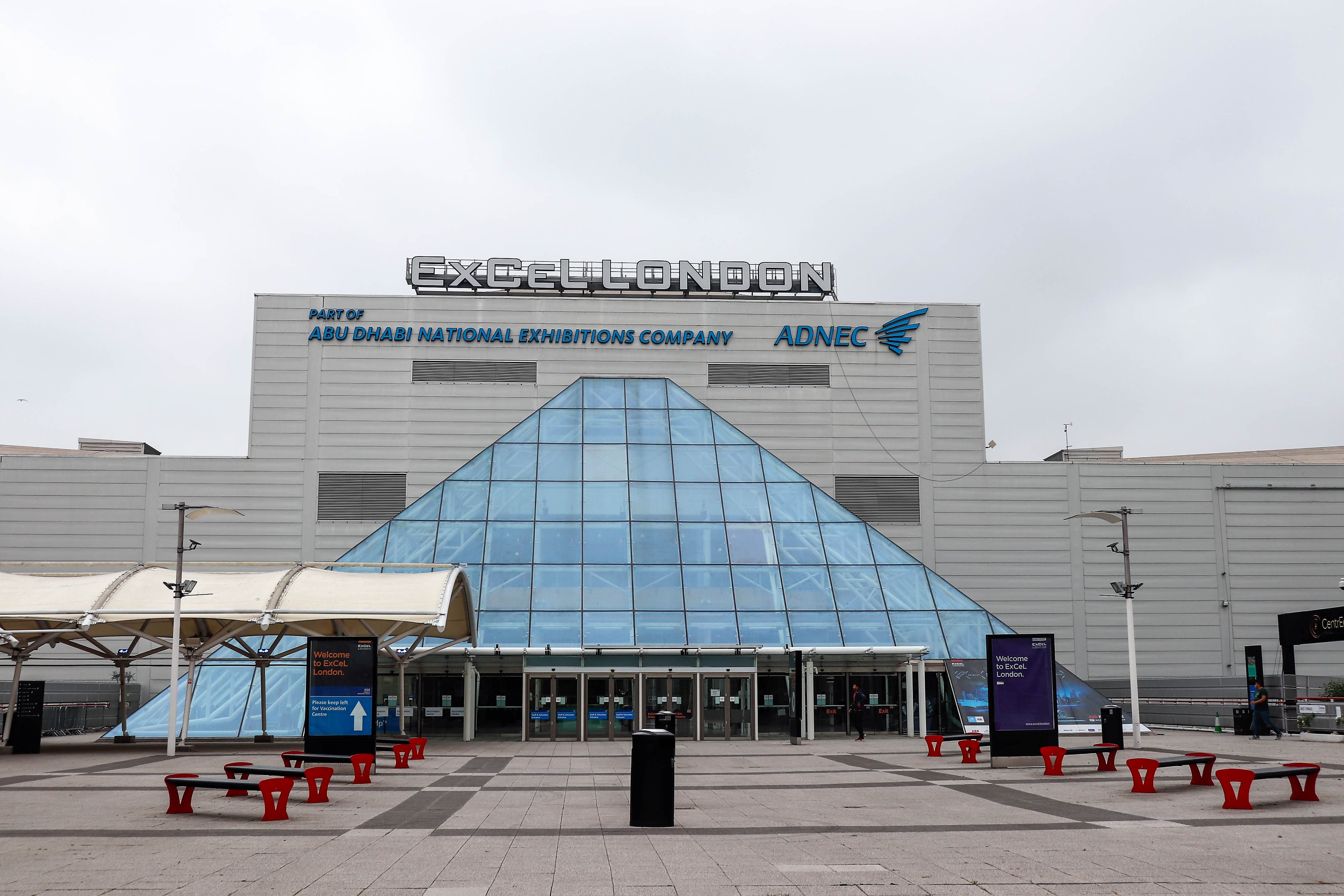
Excel London hosted judo at the 2012 Summer Olympics.

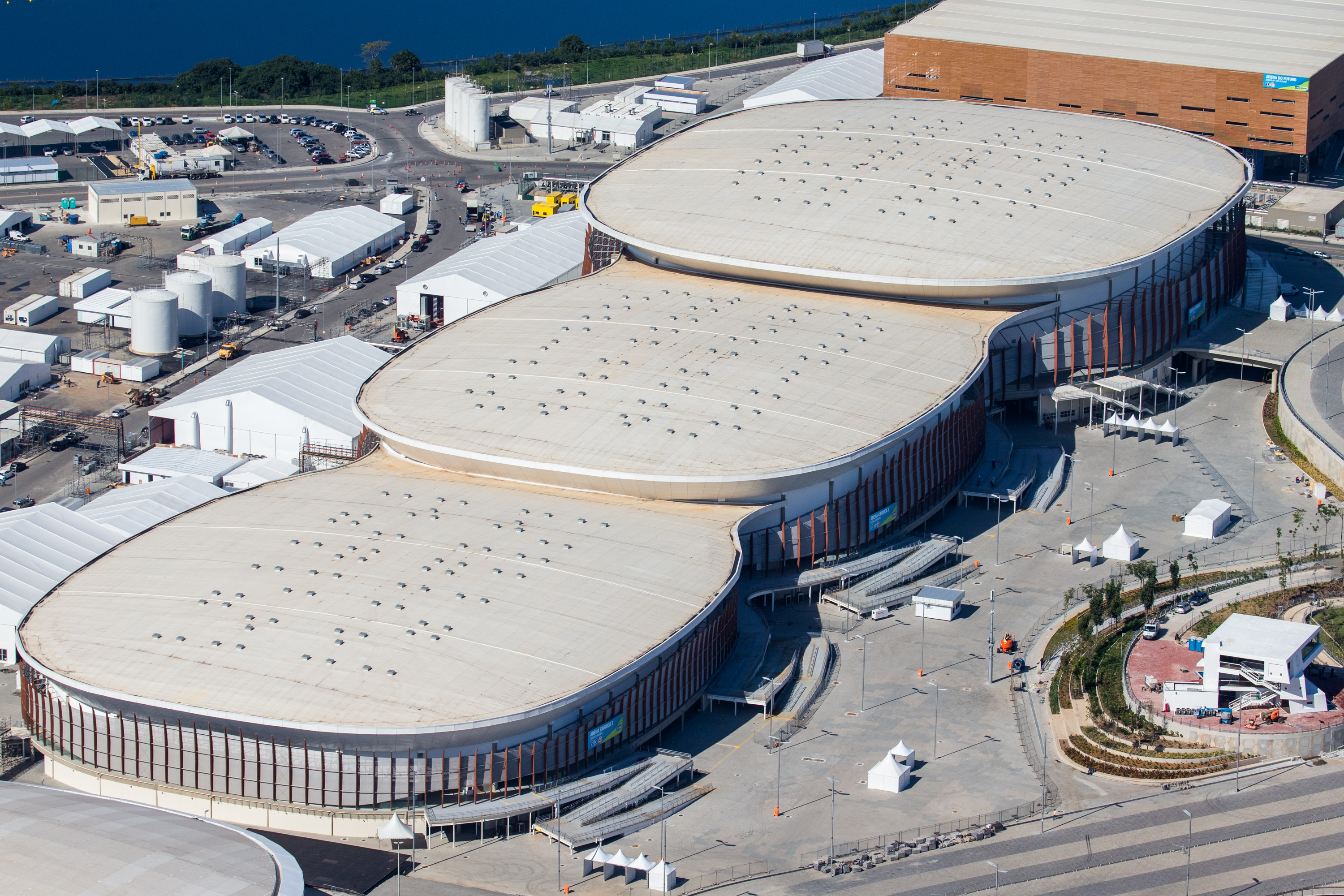
Carioca Arena 2 hosted judo at the 2016 Summer Olympics in Rio de Janeiro.

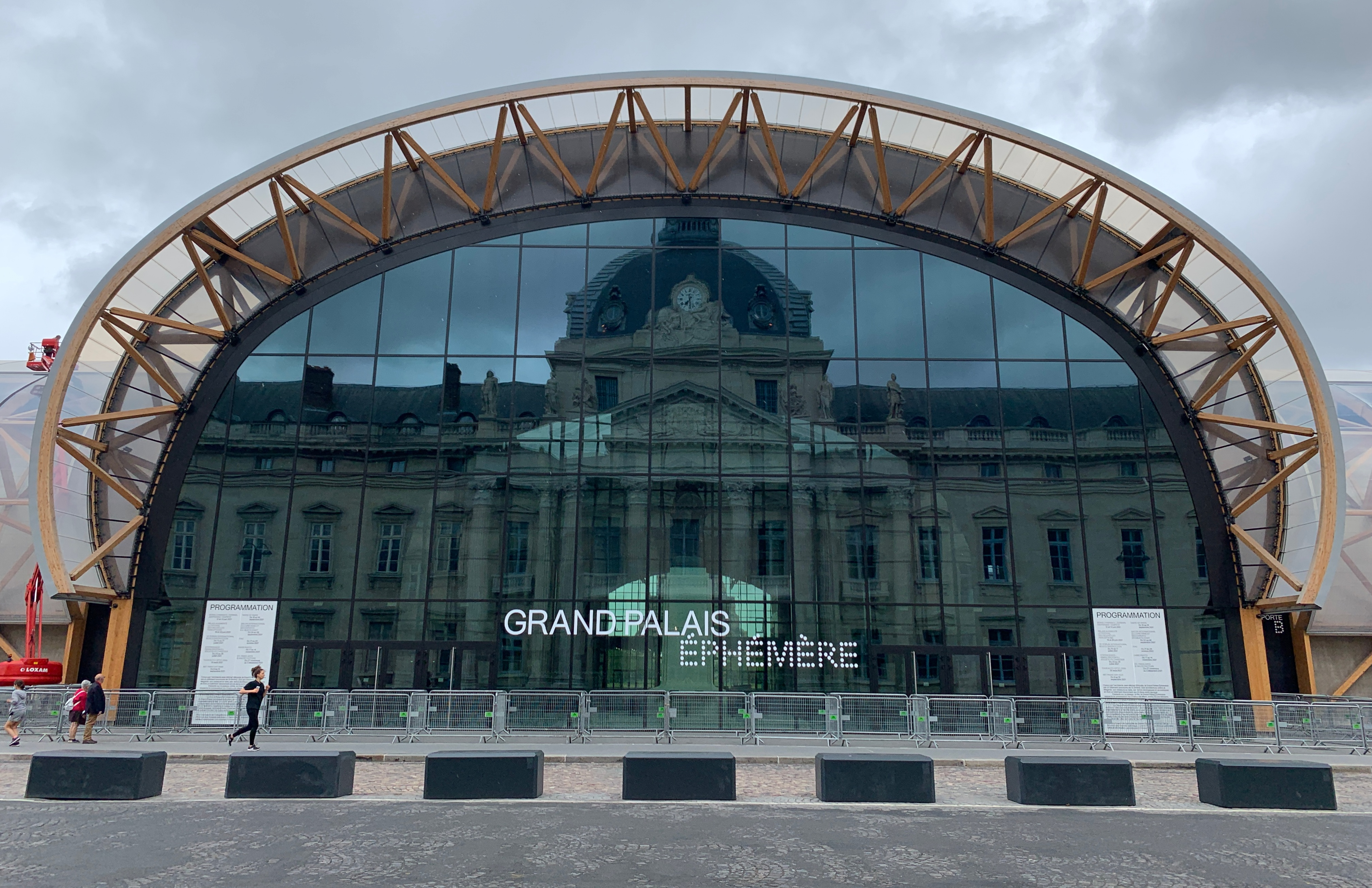
Grand Palais Éphémère hosted Judo at the 2024 Summer Olympics in Paris.

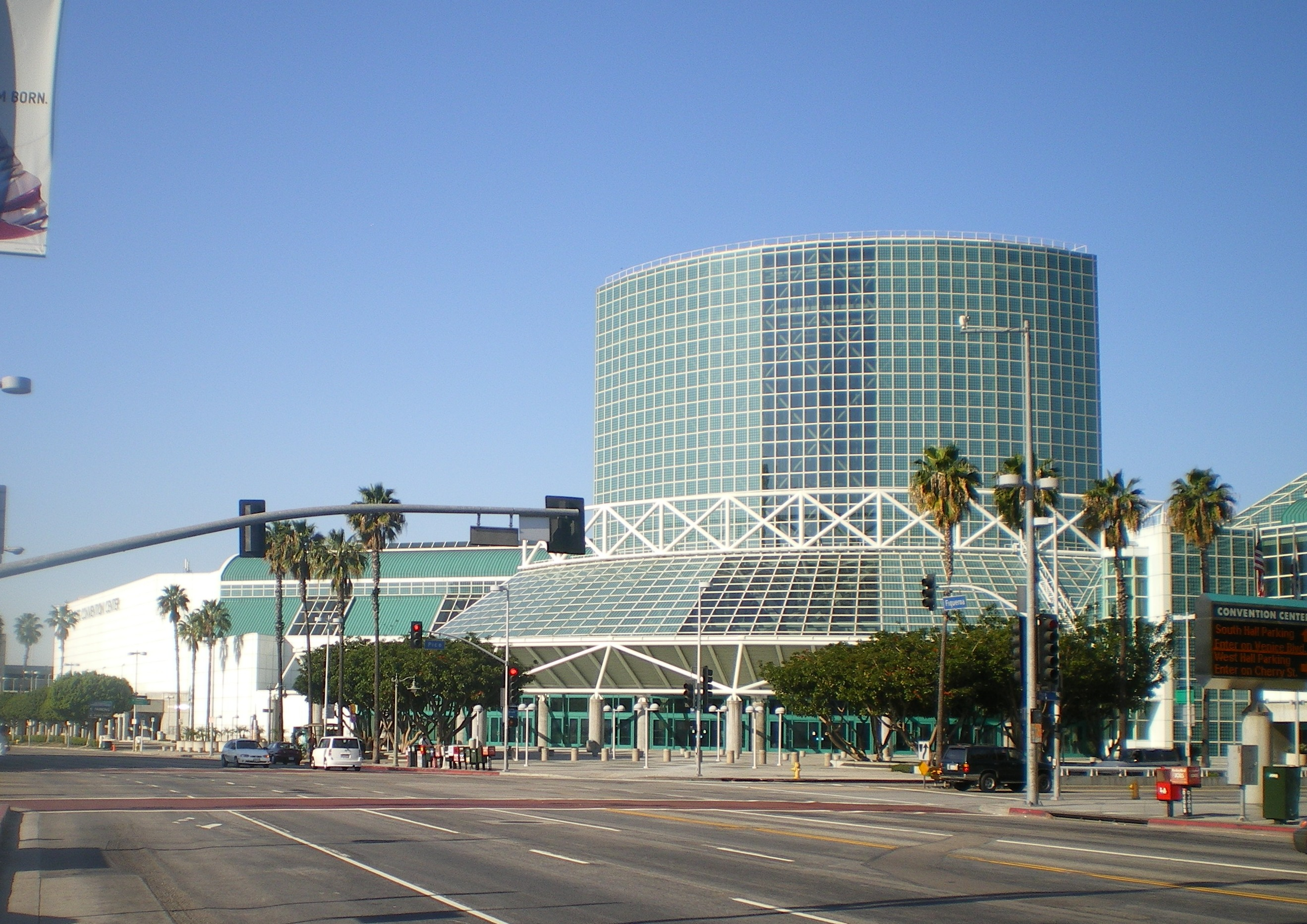
The Los Angeles Convention Center will host judo at the 2028 Summer Olympics.
