= Unified Team =

Unified Team may refer to:

A team representing countries of the former Soviet Union in the Olympic Games and Paralympics in 1992:

- Unified Team at the Olympics
- Unified Team at the Paralympics

The team also competed at the 1992 World Junior Championships in Athletics.

== See also ==
- CIS national football team
- United Team of Germany, representing West Germany, East Germany and Saarland in the Olympic Games in 1956, and East and West Germany in the Olympic Games of 1960 and 1964
- Korea Team, unified team of North and South Korea
