= Judo at the Summer Olympics =

- IOC Code: JUD
- Governing body: IJF
- Events: 15 (men: 7; women: 7; mixed: 1)

Summer Olympics
- 1896; 1900; 1904; 1908; 1912; 1920; 1924; 1928; 1932; 1936; 1948; 1952; 1956; 1960; 1964; 1968; 1972; 1976; 1980; 1984; 1988; 1992; 1996; 2000; 2004; 2008; 2012; 2016; 2020; 2024; 2028; 2032
- Medalists

Judo was first included in the Summer Olympic Games at the 1964 Games in Tokyo, Japan. After not being included in 1968, judo has been an Olympic sport in each Olympiad since then. Only male judoka participated until the 1988 Summer Olympics, when women's judo was organized as a demonstration sport. Women judoka were first awarded medals at the 1992 Summer Olympics.

== Summary ==
Games	Year	Events	Best Nation
18	1964	4	Japan (1)
19			
20	1972	6	Japan (2)
21	1976	6	Japan (3)
22	1980	8	Soviet Union (1)
23	1984	8	Japan (4)
24	1988	7 + 7	South Korea (1)
25	1992	14	Japan (5)
26	1996	14	Japan (6)
27	2000	14	Japan (7)
28	2004	14	Japan (8)
29	2008	14	Japan (9)
30	2012	14	Russia (1)
31	2016	14	Japan (10)
32	2020	15	Japan (11)
33	2024	15	Japan (12)
34	2028	15	

Note: Women's judo made its first appearance at the 1988 Olympic Games, as a demonstration sport. Women's Judo became an official part of the Olympic games from the 1992 Barcelona games and has been an integral part of the games since.

== Competition format ==
Judoka compete in weight classes. Each country may qualify a maximum of one athlete per weight class. Gold and silver medals are awarded based on a single elimination bracket. Two bronze medals are awarded in each weight class; quarter-finalists losers fight against each other in the same half of bracket. Losers finish in seventh place, winners advance to the bronze medal contest against losing semifinalist of the opposite half of the bracket. Winners of these contests receive bronze medal and losers finish in fifth place.

== Weight classes ==
There have been between 4 and 8 Olympic weight classes over the years (currently 7), and the definition of each class has changed several times, as shown in the following table.

=== Men ===
1964	1972–1976	1980–1984	1988–1996	2000–2028
Open category no weight limits				
Heavyweight +80 kg	Heavyweight +93 kg	Heavyweight +95 kg		Heavyweight +100 kg
Heavyweight +80 kg	Heavyweight +93 kg	Heavyweight +95 kg		Half Heavyweight; 90–100 kg
Heavyweight +80 kg	Heavyweight +93 kg	Half Heavyweight; 86–95 kg		Half Heavyweight; 90–100 kg
Heavyweight +80 kg	Half Heavyweight; 80–93 kg	Half Heavyweight; 86–95 kg		Half Heavyweight; 90–100 kg
Heavyweight +80 kg	Half Heavyweight; 80–93 kg	Half Heavyweight; 86–95 kg		Middleweight; 81–90 kg
Heavyweight +80 kg	Half Heavyweight; 80–93 kg	Middleweight; 78–86 kg		Middleweight; 81–90 kg
Heavyweight +80 kg	Half Heavyweight; 80–93 kg	Middleweight; 78–86 kg		Half Middleweight; 73–81 kg
Middleweight; 68–80 kg	Middleweight; 70–80 kg	Middleweight; 78–86 kg		Half Middleweight; 73–81 kg
Middleweight; 68–80 kg	Middleweight; 70–80 kg	Half Middleweight; 71–78 kg		Half Middleweight; 73–81 kg
Middleweight; 68–80 kg	Middleweight; 70–80 kg	Half Middleweight; 71–78 kg		Lightweight; 66–73 kg
Middleweight; 68–80 kg	Middleweight; 70–80 kg	Lightweight; 65–71 kg		Lightweight; 66–73 kg
Middleweight; 68–80 kg	Half Middleweight; 63–70 kg	Lightweight; 65–71 kg		Lightweight; 66–73 kg
Lightweight -68 kg	Half Middleweight; 63–70 kg	Lightweight; 65–71 kg		Lightweight; 66–73 kg
Lightweight -68 kg	Half Middleweight; 63–70 kg	Lightweight; 65–71 kg		Half Lightweight; 60–66 kg
Lightweight -68 kg	Half Middleweight; 63–70 kg	Half Lightweight; 60–65 kg		Half Lightweight; 60–66 kg
Lightweight -68 kg	Lightweight -63 kg	Half Lightweight; 60–65 kg		Half Lightweight; 60–66 kg
Lightweight -68 kg	Lightweight -63 kg	Extra Lightweight -60 kg		
4	6	8	7	7

=== Women ===
1992–1996	2000–2028
Heavyweight +72 kg	Heavyweight +78 kg
Heavyweight +72 kg	Half Heavyweight; 70–78 kg
Half Heavyweight; 66–72 kg	Half Heavyweight; 70–78 kg
Half Heavyweight; 66–72 kg	Middleweight; 63–70 kg
Middleweight; 61–66 kg	Middleweight; 63–70 kg
Middleweight; 61–66 kg	Half Middleweight; 57–63 kg
Half Middleweight; 56–61 kg	Half Middleweight; 57–63 kg
Half Middleweight; 56–61 kg	Lightweight; 52–57 kg
Lightweight; 52–56 kg	Lightweight; 52–57 kg
Half Lightweight; 48–52 kg
Extra Lightweight -48 kg
7	7

== Mixed team event ==
The mixed team event first made an appearance at the 2020 Olympic Games. The event includes teams of six athletes from different weight categories, including three men (-73 kg, -90 kg and +90 kg) and three women (-57 kg, -70 kg and +70 kg). Nation competes against nation, with rounds composed of six individual bouts. The winner of each bout will be awarded one point and the minimum score a team will need to progress to the next round will be 4:2. If the score is 3:3, there will be an extra bout, with the category selected by draw.

== Medal table ==
Judoka from 56 nations have won medals, representing all 5 continents.

Updated as of 2024 Summer Olympics

Rank	Nation	Gold	Silver	Bronze	Total
1	Japan	51	23	30	104
2	France	18	15	34	67
3	South Korea	11	19	21	51
4	China	8	3	12	23
5	Cuba	6	15	16	37
6	Georgia	5	7	3	15
7	Soviet Union	5	5	13	23
8	Brazil	5	4	19	28
9	Italy	5	4	9	18
10	Russia	5	4	7	16
11	Netherlands	4	2	18	24
12	Germany	3	4	15	22
13	Poland	3	3	2	8
14	Azerbaijan	3	2	2	7
15	Slovenia	3	1	3	7
15	Spain	3	1	3	7
17	Kosovo	3	1	1	5
18	United States	2	4	8	14
19	Austria	2	3	3	8
20	North Korea	2	2	4	8
21	Belgium	2	1	11	14
22	Unified Team	2	0	2	4
23	Czech Republic	2	0	0	2
24	Mongolia	1	5	6	12
25	West Germany	1	4	3	8
26	Hungary	1	3	6	10
27	Uzbekistan	1	2	7	10
28	East Germany	1	2	6	9
29	Canada	1	2	5	8
30	Kazakhstan	1	2	3	6
30	Romania	1	2	3	6
32	Switzerland	1	1	2	4
33	Greece	1	0	2	3
34	Argentina	1	0	1	2
34	Belarus	1	0	1	2
34	Turkey	1	0	1	2
37	Croatia	1	0	0	1
38	Great Britain	0	8	12	20
39	Israel	0	3	6	9
40	Ukraine	0	1	3	4
41	Bulgaria	0	1	2	3
42	Algeria	0	1	1	2
42	Colombia	0	1	1	2
42	Egypt	0	1	1	2
42	United Team of Germany	0	1	1	2
46	Chinese Taipei	0	1	0	1
46	Mexico	0	1	0	1
46	Slovakia	0	1	0	1
49	Portugal	0	0	4	4
50	Estonia	0	0	3	3
50	ROC (ROC)	0	0	3	3
50	Tajikistan	0	0	3	3
53	Australia	0	0	2	2
53	Moldova	0	0	2	2
53	Yugoslavia	0	0	2	2
56	Czechoslovakia	0	0	1	1
56	Iceland	0	0	1	1
56	Kyrgyzstan	0	0	1	1
56	Latvia	0	0	1	1
56	Sweden	0	0	1	1
56	United Arab Emirates	0	0	1	1
Totals (61 entries)		167	166	334	667

== Number of judoka by nation ==
Nation	96	00	04	08	12	20	24	28	32	36	48	52	56	60	64	68	72	76	80	84	88	92	96	00	04	08	12	16	20	24	Years
Afghanistan																									1		1	1			3
Albania																										1	1		1		3
Algeria																			3		5	3	6	7	11	10	2	5	2	3	11
American Samoa																										1	1	1			3
Andorra																						1	1		1	1		1			5
Angola																					7	4			1		1	1	1	1	7
Argentina															3		1	2	4	4	3	9	8	9	9	9	4	2	2	1	15
Armenia																							1	1	1	2	2	1	1		7
Aruba																								1		1	1	1			4
Australia															4		4	3	3	3	3	2	12	14	12	13	5	7	3	3	15
Austria															3		6	4	5	4	3	6	5	3	2	3	3	5	6	6	15
Azerbaijan																							2	4	3	6	8	6	8	9	8
Bahrain																														1	1
Barbados																					1		1	1	1		1				5
Belarus																							4	5	7	4	2	2	3		7
Belgium																	4	2	1	2	4	9	7	9	3	3	6	5	4	4	14
Belize																											1	1			2
Benin																					1						1	1	1	1	5
Bhutan																													1		1
Bolivia																				1	1	2			1			1			5
Bosnia and Herzegovina																						1	1	1	1	1	1	1	1	2	9
Botswana																												1			1
Brazil															1		2	3	7	7	3	14	12	12	12	13	14	14	13	13	15
Bulgaria																		4	4		2	5	1	2	2		1	2	3	2	11
Burkina Faso																						1			1	1	1	1	1		6
Burundi																											1	1		1	3
Cambodia																											1				1
Cameroon																			5	6			1	3	4	1	1	1	2	1	10
Canada															1		5	5		8	3	12	11	6	6	5	8	7	6	7	14
Cape Verde																											1		1	1	3
Central African Republic																						3			1					1	3
Chad																						2					1		1		3
Chile																				1				1	1	1	1	1	1	2	8
China																				5	2	10	11	11	9	14	8	8	6	6	11
Chinese Taipei																				4	3	2	10	6	2	2	1	2	3	3	11
Colombia																					1				3	2	2	2	1	1	7
Comoros																													1		1
Republic of the Congo																				3				1	1			1			4
Costa Rica															2		1		3	4	1		2		1		1	1	1	1	11
Croatia																											2	1	3	3	4
Cuba																	3	3	6			12	12	14	12	14	9	9	6	4	12
Cyprus																			5	2	2	2			1					1	6
Czech Republic																							4	3	1	2	3	3	2	3	8
Czechoslovakia																	1	2	5		2	5									5
Democratic Republic of the Congo																						6				1	1	1	1	1	6
Denmark																				1	1								1	1	4
Djibouti																						2					1	1	1	1	5
Dominican Republic																	2			2	1	4	3	5	5	3	1	1	1	1	12
East Germany																	5	1	6		2										4
Ecuador																		1	2	1		1		2	2	3	1	3	3	1	11
Egypt																				6	1	3	2	3	6	4	5	5	3	2	11
El Salvador																				2	1	1	2	1		1	1	1		1	9
Equatorial Guinea																										1					1
Estonia																						1	1	2	2	1	1	1	1	1	9
Fiji																				2		4	1	2	2	1	1	1	1	1	10
Finland																	1	2	3	3		7	1	1	1	2	3	1		2	12
France															4		5	1	7	8	3	14	14	14	13	13	14	14	13	14	15
Gabon																						2	1	2	1	1	1	2	1	1	9
The Gambia																												1	1	1	3
Georgia																							6	6	7	7	7	8	9	10	8
Germany															4							13	13	11	12	11	11	13	13	10	10
Ghana																											1	1	1		3
Great Britain															4		5	3	8	8	3	14	13	9	8	7	14	7	6	5	15
Greece																						2	1		14	3	2	2	2	2	8
Guam																					1	2				1	1		1	1	6
Guatemala																							2	1			1	1	1	1	6
Guinea																			3	1		3		1	1		1	1		2	8
Guinea-Bissau																												1	1	1	3
Guyana																		1									1				2
Haiti																						5	2	1	2	2	1	1	1	1	9
Honduras																				1			3		1		1	1	1		6
Hong Kong																	1			4	3	4	1				1			1	7
Hungary																	5	1	8		3	12	7	6	2	6	8	8	7	7	13
Iceland																			2	2		3	1			1	1	1			7
Independent Olympic Athletes																						4					1				2
India																						5	2	1	1	2	1	1	1	1	9
Indonesia																						4	1	2	2		1			1	6
Iran																							1	3	6	6	2	2			6
Iraq																									1			1			2
Ireland															1		5		2	1	1	2	2				1		2		9
Israel																		1		2		4	2	3	5	3	5	7	12	12	11
Italy															2		3	2	1	5	2	9	9	9	9	8	9	6	8	13	15
Ivory Coast																			2			2	2	3			1	1	1	1	8
Jamaica																													1	1	2
Japan															4		5	2		8	3	14	14	14	14	14	14	14	14	14	14
Jordan																												1	1		2
Kazakhstan																							8	8	8	10	9	6	6	8	8
Kenya																					2	3						1		1	4
Kiribati																													1	1	2
Kosovo																												2	5	5	3
Kuwait																			5	5	2	2	2		1	1					7
Kyrgyzstan																							2	1	1	2	2	2	1	2	8
Laos																												1	1		2
Latvia																						2		1	1	2	3	2	1		7
Lebanon																	2		2	3	2	4				1	1	1	1	1	10
Liberia																											1				1
Libya																						2			1	1	1	1	1		6
Liechtenstein																	2	3		2	2	2	1	1					1		8
Lithuania																						1	1	1	1	1	2	1	1		8
Luxembourg																						1	1			1	1				4
North Macedonia																												1			1
Madagascar																	4		2			2		1	1	1	1	1	1	1	10
Malaysia															1																1
Mali																	2		3	1	2	2		1	1		1	1	1		10
Malta																					2	2		1	1	1					5
Mauritius																							3	1				1	1	1	5
Mexico															3		3	1	2	4	2	1	2	1	3	2	2	2	1	2	15
Moldova																							2	4	1	1	2	1	2	3	30
Monaco																				1	1		1			1	1	1	1		7
Mongolia																	5	2	8		3	10	3	8	8	10	9	13	12	10	13
Montenegro																										1	1	1	1		4
Morocco																	3	1		3	2		3	2	2	4	3	3	2	2	12
Mozambique																										1		1	1	1	4
Myanmar																						1					1	1			3
Nauru																											1	1			2
Nepal																					2					1		1	1	1	5
Netherlands															4		3		2	3	1	10	10	10	7	10	9	11	10	10	14
Netherlands Antilles																		2					1								2
New Zealand																	1			3	1	4	2	3	1		1	1		2	10
Nicaragua																	1	1					2						1		4
Niger																									1		1	1	1		4
Nigeria																					1	2	1	1	2	1					6
North Korea																	2	1	4			3	1	5	6	7	1	3		1	11
North Macedonia																													1		1
North Yemen																					2										1
Norway																				3		1									2
Pakistan																												1	1		2
Palau																											1				1
Palestine																											1	1	1		3
Panama															1									1			1		2	1	5
Papua New Guinea																											1	1			2
Paraguay																				1	1	1	1				1			1	6
Peru																				1				1		1	1	1	1	1	7
Philippines															4		3				1	2					1	1	1	1	8
Poland																	5	5	7		3	11	12	4	6	7	6	4	6	4	13
Portugal															1		2		3		2	8	5	6	4	5	4	6	8	7	13
Puerto Rico																	3	1		2	3	4	4	4	3	3	1	2	3	2	13
Qatar																												1	1		2
Refugee Olympic Team																												2	6		2
Republic of China															4		4														2
Romania																			8	3		6	5	7	4	2	6	4	3	1	11
Russia																							13	10	11	13	12	12			6
Rwanda																											1				1
Samoa																								1			2	1	1	1	5
San Marino																			2	2	2	1	1					1	2		7
Saudi Arabia																											2	2	1		3
Senegal																	5	2	7	6	2	6	2	1	1	4	1	1	1	1	14
Serbia																											1	1	5	6	4
Serbia and Montenegro																							2		1						2
Seychelles																								1	1		1	1	1		5
Sierra Leone																													1		1
Singapore																						1									1
Slovakia																							2	1	2	1	1			1	6
Slovenia																						2			5	5	8	5	5	6	7
South Africa																							1	1	1	3	1	1	1	1	8
South Korea															4		2	1		8	3	14	11	12	13	14	14	12	14	11	14
Soviet Union															3		5	1	8		3										5
Spain																	1	2		6	2	12	9	12	10	6	6	5	7	9	13
Sri Lanka																												1	1		2
Sudan																						2						1	1		3
Suriname																	1			1	1							1			4
Sweden																	1	1	4	4	2	6	1	2	1		1	4	4	2	13
Switzerland															1				4	2		5	1	4	2	1	2	3	2	3	12
Syria																			7						1			1			3
Tajikistan																							3			3	2	2	4	6	6
Tanzania																												1			1
Thailand															3		1	1				2	1				1	1	1	1	9
Togo																								1		1	1				3
Tonga																									1						1
Trinidad and Tobago																												1	1		2
Tunisia															1					3		1	6	9	4	6	4	4	3	2	11
Turkey																				3	3	4	6	3	3	1	2	4	6	8	11
Turkmenistan																							2	2	1	2	1	2	1	2	8
Ukraine																							3	6	8	9	10	7	7	5	8
Unified Team																						13									1
United Arab Emirates																										1	1	3	2	6	5
United States															5		5	2		8	3	13	14	13	12	10	5	6	4	4	14
Uruguay																						1	2	1			1	1	1	1	7
Uzbekistan																							7	6	6	8	7	8	10	12	8
Vanuatu																											1	1	1	1	4
Venezuela															1			1		1		3	3	9	9	7	2	1	3	1	12
Vietnam															3								1				1	1	1	1	6
West Germany																	5	2		8	3										4
Yemen																						5				1	1	1	1		5
Yugoslavia																	4	1	6	5	1			1							6
Zambia																			6			1					1	1	1	1	6
Zimbabwe																			2		1	2									3
Year	96	00	04	08	12	20	24	28	32	36	48	52	56	60	64	68	72	76	80	84	88	92	96	00	04	08	12	16	20	24	

== See also ==
- List of Olympic venues in judo
- Judo at the Summer Paralympics
