= East Germany at the Olympics =

- IOC code: GDR
- NOC: National Olympic Committee of the German Democratic Republic
- Medals Ranked 11th: Gold 192 Silver 165 Bronze 162 Total 519

Summer appearances
- 1968; 1972; 1976; 1980; 1984; 1988

Winter appearances
- 1968; 1972; 1976; 1980; 1984; 1988

Other related appearances
- Germany (1896–1936, 1992–pres.); United Team of Germany (1956–1964)

The German Democratic Republic (GDR), often called East Germany, founded a separate National Olympic Committee for socialist East Germany on 22 April 1951 in the Rotes Rathaus of East Berlin. This was the last of three German Olympic committees of the time. It was not recognized by the IOC for over a decade.

== Timeline of participation ==
Olympic Year/s	Team(s)	
1896–1912	German Empire	
1920–1924	denied participation after WWI	
1928–1932	Germany	
1936	Germany	
1948	occupied country after WWII: former German Olympic Committee was dissolved	
1952 W	Germany	
1952 S	Germany	
1952 S	Saar	East Germany did not participate
1956–1964	United Team of Germany (EUA)	
1968–1988	West Germany (FRG)	East Germany (GDR)
1992–present	Germany	

== History ==
=== Division of Germany ===
After the division of Germany following World War II, three separate states had been founded under occupation. After the Allies denied attempts made in 1947 to continue the participation of Germany at the Olympics, no German team could participate in the 1948 games. Finally, in 1949, the National Olympic Committee for Germany was founded in the Western Federal Republic of Germany. This was later recognized by the IOC as representing both German states. The small French-occupied Saarland and its NOC (SAA) joined the Federal Republic of Germany after 1955, having not been allowed to join the German counterparts previously.

The East German Nationales Olympisches Komitee für Ostdeutschland authority refused to send their athletes to the 1952 games as participants of an all-German team, demanding a team of their own. This was denied by the IOC.

=== United German Team ===
They agreed to participate in 1956. German athletes from the two remaining states competed at the Olympic Games in 1956, 1960 and 1964 as the United Team of Germany. While this team was simply called 'Germany' at the time, it is currently designated by the IOC as EUA, 'Équipe unifiée d'Allemagne'.

=== Success of East Germans ===
The socialist GDR erected the Berlin Wall in 1961, during the Cold War. They renamed their NOC to Nationales Olympisches Komitee der DDR in 1965. It was recognized as an independent NOC by the IOC in 1968. Following this, the GDR ceased participation in the United German team and sent a separate East German team from 1968 to 1988, other than absences in the summer of 1984 in being part of the Soviet-led boycott of the 1984 Summer Olympics.

While the GDR, a small state with a population of about 16 million, has a short history, and even a shorter history at the Olympics, it was extremely successful. From 1976 to 1988, it came second in all three of their summer Olympics, behind the Soviet Union, but well ahead of larger West Germany. This was improved upon at five winter games, with 4 second-place rankings and a first in the 1984 Winter Olympics.

It is widely believed that doping (predominantly anabolic steroids) allowed East Germany, with its small population, to become a world leader in the following two decades. It won a large number of Olympic and world gold medals and records. A number of athletes subsequently failed doping tests and others were suspected of taking performance-enhancing drugs. However, in many cases where suspicions existed, no proof of wrongdoing was uncovered. As a result, the majority of records and medals won by East German athletes still stand. Aside from an extensive doping programme, East Germany invested significantly in sport, particularly in Olympic sports. It had an extensive state bureaucracy to select and train promising athletes and world-class coaches.

An important figure in the GDR was Manfred Ewald (1926–2002), member of SED central committee from 1963. He was president of the "Staatliches Komitee für Körperkultur und Sport" (Stako) from 1952 to 1960. In 1961, he became president of the "Deutscher Turn- und Sportbund" (DTSB), governing all sport in the GDR, and in 1973 president of the NOC. He is considered to be the organiser of the "GDR sports miracle". His post-1990 autobiography was titled "I was the Sport". He fell from grace in 1988, having been removed from the office of DTSB. In 2001, he was found guilty of doping.

=== Germany reunited ===
The German Democratic Republic ceased to exist in 1990, joining the West into a reunified Germany in the process of German reunification. Accordingly, the "NOC of the GDR" joined the "NOC of Germany" on 17 November 1990. German athletes competed at the Olympic Games as a single team again from 1992 onwards. Athletes from the Eastern part of Germany contributed disproportionately to the medals won by Germany, particularly in the first decade after reunification. This is thought to indicate that doping was not the only reason East Germany was so successful (and more successful than West Germany in particular) in the Olympics, with professional training conditions also being significant. The medal tally of reunited Germany after 1990 was more comparable to that of East Germany before 1990 than of West Germany before 1990. For example, of the twenty nine medals Germany won in the 2006 Winter Olympics East German born (containing one-fifth of the population of Germany) athletes won fourteen (six gold). West German athletes won only nine medals (three gold), with six medals won in mixed teams. In recent years, some centres of German top-class sport have relocated to the West, for example winter sports to Bavaria. However, the East is still performing better than the West. Trainers from East Germany (e.g. Uwe Müßiggang) were important in producing sporting success for United Germany. Also, many top-class German athletes who today live in the western part of Germany started their professional sport careers in the East, and can be seen as part of the large-scale exodus of young people from the East to the West since reunification.

== Medal tables ==
=== Medals by Summer Games ===
Games	Athletes	Gold	Silver	Bronze	Total	Rank
1896–1912	as part of German Empire					
1920 Antwerp	did not participate					
1924 Paris	did not participate					
1928–1936	as part of (Weimar Republic) / (Nazi Germany) Germany					
1948 London	did not participate					
1952 Helsinki	did not participate					
1956–1964	as part of United Team of Germany					
1968 Mexico City	226	9	9	7	25	5
1972 Munich	297	20	23	23	66	3
1976 Montreal	267	40	25	25	90	2
1980 Moscow	345	47	37	42	126	2
1984 Los Angeles	boycotted					
1988 Seoul	259	37	35	30	102	2
1992–present	as part of Germany					
Total (5/30)	1,394	153	129	127	409	11

=== Medals by Winter Games ===
Games	Athletes	Gold	Silver	Bronze	Total	Rank
1924–1936	as part of (Weimar Republic) / (Nazi Germany) Germany					
1948 St. Moritz	did not participate					
1952 Oslo	did not participate					
1956–1964	as part of United Team of Germany					
1968 Grenoble	57	1	2	2	5	10
1972 Sapporo	42	4	3	7	14	2
1976 Innsbruck	59	7	5	7	19	2
1980 Lake Placid	53	9	7	7	23	2
1984 Sarajevo	56	9	9	6	24	1
1988 Calgary	53	9	10	6	25	2
1992–present	as part of Germany					
Total (6/24)	320	39	36	35	110	14

=== Medals by summer sport ===
Sport	Gold	Silver	Bronze	Total
Athletics	38	36	35	109
Swimming	38	32	22	92
Rowing	33	7	8	48
Canoeing	14	7	9	30
Gymnastics	6	13	17	36
Cycling	6	6	4	16
Boxing	5	2	6	13
Shooting	3	8	5	16
Wrestling	2	3	2	7
Diving	2	2	3	7
Sailing	2	2	2	6
Weightlifting	1	4	6	11
Judo	1	2	6	9
Football	1	1	1	3
Handball	1	1	1	3
Volleyball	0	2	0	2
Fencing	0	1	0	1
Totals (17 entries)	153	129	127	409

=== Medals by winter sport ===
Sport	Gold	Silver	Bronze	Total
Luge	13	8	8	29
Speed skating	8	12	9	29
Bobsleigh	5	5	3	13
Biathlon	3	4	4	11
Figure skating	3	3	4	10
Nordic combined	3	0	4	7
Ski jumping	2	3	2	7
Cross country skiing	2	1	1	4
Totals (8 entries)	39	36	35	110

== See also ==
- List of flag bearers for East Germany at the Olympics
- Olympic competitors for East Germany
- East Germany at the Paralympics
- East Germany national athletics team
- Doping in East Germany
