= West Germany at the Olympics =

- Flag of Germany
- IOC code: FRG
- NOC: National Olympic Committee for Germany
- Medals Ranked 24th: Gold 67 Silver 82 Bronze 94 Total 243

Summer appearances
- 1968; 1972; 1976; 1980; 1984; 1988

Winter appearances
- 1968; 1972; 1976; 1980; 1984; 1988

Other related appearances
- Germany (1896–1936, 1952, 1992–pres.); Saar (1952); United Team of Germany (1956–1964)

West Germany competed at the Olympic Games between 1952 and 1988. While in 1952 - Germany's first Olympics after World War II and the Partitions of Germany - there was a de facto West German team, given East Germany refused to collaborate, its results are counted towards Germany. Likewise, between 1956 and 1964 both countries competed together under the United Team of Germany flag. It was not until 1968 that a full-fledged West German team appeared, and it competed in all the Olympics but the 1980 Summer Olympics - as it supported the 1980 Summer Olympics boycott - until 1988. Afterwards, the German reunification in 1990 reestablished the German team.

== Timeline of participation ==
Olympic Year/s	Team(s)	
1896–1912	German Empire	
1920–1924	denied participation after WWI	
1928–1932	Germany	
1936	Germany	
1948	occupied country after WWII: former German Olympic Committee was dissolved	
1952 W	Germany	
1952 S	Germany	
1952 S	Saar	East Germany did not participate
1956–1964	United Team of Germany (EUA)	
1968–1988	West Germany (FRG)	East Germany (GDR)
1992–present	Germany	

== Hosted games ==
West Germany has hosted the games on one occasion.

Games	Host city	Dates	Nations	Participants	Events
1972 Summer Olympics	Munich, Bavaria	26 August – 10 September	121	7,134	195

== Medal tables ==
Host country

=== Medals by Summer Games ===
Games	Athletes	Gold	Silver	Bronze	Total	Rank
1896–1912	as part of German Empire					
1920 Antwerp	did not participate					
1924 Paris	did not participate					
1928–1936	as part of (Weimar Republic) / (Nazi Germany) Germany					
1948 London	did not participate					
1952 Helsinki	as part of Germany					
1956–1964	as part of United Team of Germany					
1968 Mexico City	275	5	11	10	26	8
1972 Munich	423	13	11	16	40	4
1976 Montreal	290	10	12	17	39	4
1980 Moscow	boycotted					
1984 Los Angeles	390	17	19	23	59	3
1988 Seoul	347	11	14	15	40	5
1992–present	as part of Germany					
Total (5/30)	1,725	56	67	81	204	24

=== Medals by Winter Games ===
Games	Athletes	Gold	Silver	Bronze	Total	Rank
1924–1936	as part of (Weimar Republic) / (Nazi Germany) Germany					
1948 St. Moritz	did not participate					
1952 Oslo	as part of Germany					
1956–1964	as part of United Team of Germany					
1968 Grenoble	87	2	2	3	7	8
1972 Sapporo	78	3	1	1	5	6
1976 Innsbruck	71	2	5	3	10	5
1980 Lake Placid	80	0	2	3	5	12
1984 Sarajevo	84	2	1	1	4	8
1988 Calgary	90	2	4	2	8	8
1992–present	as part of Germany					
Total (6/24)	490	11	15	13	39	20

=== Medals by summer sport ===
Sport	Gold	Silver	Bronze	Total
Athletics	12	14	17	43
Equestrian	11	5	9	25
Fencing	7	8	1	16
Cycling	4	5	5	14
Rowing	4	4	6	14
Shooting	4	4	3	11
Swimming	3	5	14	22
Canoeing	2	6	3	11
Sailing	2	2	3	7
Weightlifting	2	2	3	7
Wrestling	1	4	4	9
Judo	1	4	3	8
Field hockey	1	3	0	4
Boxing	1	0	5	6
Tennis	1	0	1	2
Handball	0	1	0	1
Gymnastics	0	0	2	2
Football	0	0	1	1
Water polo	0	0	1	1
Totals (19 entries)	56	67	81	204

=== Medals by winter sport ===
Sport	Gold	Silver	Bronze	Total
Alpine skiing	3	5	1	9
Speed skating	3	0	0	3
Nordic combined	2	1	0	3
Luge	1	4	5	10
Bobsleigh	1	3	2	6
Biathlon	1	2	2	5
Figure skating	0	0	2	2
Ice hockey	0	0	1	1
Totals (8 entries)	11	15	13	39

== See also ==
- Germany at the Olympics
