= Germany at the Olympics =

- IOC code: GER
- NOC: German Olympic Sports Confederation
- Website: www.dosb.de (in German, English, and French)
- Medals Ranked 4th: Gold 327 Silver 326 Bronze 327 Total 980

Summer appearances
- 1896; 1900; 1904; 1908; 1912; 1920–1924; 1928; 1932; 1936; 1948; 1952; 1956–1988; 1992; 1996; 2000; 2004; 2008; 2012; 2016; 2020; 2024; 2028

Winter appearances
- 1928; 1932; 1936; 1948; 1952; 1956–1988; 1992; 1994; 1998; 2002; 2006; 2010; 2014; 2018; 2022; 2026

Other related appearances
- 1906 Intercalated Games –––– Saar (1952); United Team of Germany (1956–1964); East Germany (1968–1988); West Germany (1968–1988)

Athletes from Germany have taken part in most of the modern Olympic Games held since 1896. Germany has hosted three Olympic Games, in 1936, both the Winter and Summer Games, and the 1972 Summer Olympics. In addition, Germany had been selected to host the 1916 Summer Olympics as well as the 1940 Winter Olympics, both of which had to be cancelled due to World Wars. After these wars, Germany was banned from participating in the 1920, 1924, and 1948 Olympics.

While the country was divided, each of the two German states boycotted one of the Summer Games. In 1980, West Germany was one of 66 nations which did not go to Moscow in protest of the Soviet Union's invasion of Afghanistan, and in 1984 East Germany joined the Soviet Union and several others in the boycott of the Summer Games in Los Angeles. In 1990, East Germany and West Germany would reunite, with Germany once again competing as a single full sovereign state since the 1992 Olympic year.

The IOC currently splits German results among four codes, even though only the German Democratic Republic (GDR) from 1968 to 1988 had sent a separate team to compete against the team of the German NOC that represented Germany (GER) since 1896.

== German post-WW2 division until 1990 ==
After German organisations had been dissolved by the Allies in 1947, in 1950 the IOC recognized the reorganized Nationales Olympisches Komitee für Deutschland for all of Germany, based in (West) Germany.

Due to the Cold War, an East German state (German Democratic Republic) was created in October 1949, and a separate National Olympic Committee (NOC) for East Germany was established in 1951. It was not immediately recognized by the IOC, which until 1965 required that athletes of the NOC of East Germany join the German team represented by the West Germany-based NOC of Germany. This team, which competed together from 1956 to 1964, is nowadays called the United Team of Germany (EUA, "Équipe Unifiée Allemande"), but it was Germany (GER) then. As a result of Germany being divided, from 1968 to 1990, two independent teams competed in each of the Games; the original designations were GER for the Federal Republic of Germany (West Germany) and GDR for the German Democratic Republic (East Germany). In 1980 the West German code was changed to FRG (which is currently also applied by the IOC in retrospect). After the GDR ceased to exist in 1990 and its states joined the Federal Republic of Germany, Germany once again was represented by a single team, designated GER.

Additionally, in the early 1950s the French-occupied Saar had its own NOC and competed at the 1952 Summer Olympics before joining the German Olympic team in 1956 and the (West) German state by 1957.

== Timeline of participation ==
Olympic Year/s	Team(s)	
1896–1912	German Empire	
1920–1924	denied participation after WWI	
1928–1932	Germany	
1936	Germany	
1948	occupied country after WWII: former German Olympic Committee was dissolved	
1952 W	Germany	
1952 S	Germany	
1952 S	Saar	East Germany did not participate
1956–1964	United Team of Germany (EUA)	
1968–1988	West Germany (FRG)	East Germany (GDR)
1992–present	Germany	

== Medal tables ==
=== Medals by Summer Games ===
Host country

Games	Athletes	Gold	Silver	Bronze	Total	Rank
(Kingdom of Greece) 1896 Athens	19	6	5	2	13	3
(French Third Republic) 1900 Paris	78	4	3	2	9	7
(United States) 1904 St. Louis	18	5	4	5	14	2
(United Kingdom) 1908 London	81	3	5	5	13	5
(Sweden) 1912 Stockholm	185	5	13	7	25	6
(Belgium) 1920 Antwerp	did not participate					
(French Third Republic) 1924 Paris	did not participate					
(Netherlands) 1928 Amsterdam	296	10	7	14	31	2
(United States) 1932 Los Angeles	143	3	12	5	20	9
(Nazi Germany) 1936 Berlin	433	33	26	30	89	1
(United Kingdom) 1948 London	did not participate					
(Finland) 1952 Helsinki	205	0	7	17	24	28
1956–1964	as the United Team of Germany					
1968–1988	as West Germany and East Germany					
(Spain) 1992 Barcelona	463	33	21	28	82	3
(United States) 1996 Atlanta	465	20	18	27	65	3
(Australia) 2000 Sydney	422	13	17	26	56	5
(Greece) 2004 Athens	441	13	16	20	49	6
(China) 2008 Beijing	463	16	11	14	41	5
(United Kingdom) 2012 London	392	11	20	13	44	6
(Brazil) 2016 Rio de Janeiro	425	17	10	15	42	5
(Japan) 2020 Tokyo	425	10	11	16	37	9
(France) 2024 Paris	428	12	13	8	33	10
(United States) 2028 Los Angeles	future event					
(Australia) 2032 Brisbane	future event					
Total (18/30)	5,382	214	219	254	687	7

Notes

- ^{NAT} Under the current IOC's attribution policy since 2024, athletes at the early Olympic Games (1896, 1900, and 1904) are attributed according to the national affiliation of their club rather than their nationality. For the 1904 Summer Olympics, this resulted in a net change of +1 gold, −1 silver, and −1 bronze for Germany:
  - (+) Swiss Adolf Spinnler won a gold medal and a bronze medal in gymnastics; as a representative of a German club, his results were attributed to Germany.
  - (–) German Frank Kugler won a silver medal in wrestling and two bronze medals in weightlifting; as a representative of an American club, his results were attributed to the United States.
- ^{ART} Art competitions (1912–1948) are not included in the medal table above, as they were non-sports events formerly part of the Olympic Games. (Note: In 1952, art competition medals, as well as the gold medal awards for feats in alpinism and aeronautics, were removed from the official national medal counts. Only since 2021 have they been officially listed again by the IOC in the medal tables and respective National Olympic Committee (NOC) profiles on its website.) Germany won a total of 24 art competition medals (8 gold, 7 silver, and 9 bronze), across the 1912, 1928, 1932, and 1936 Summer Olympics.

=== Medals by Winter Games ===
Host country

Games	Athletes	Gold	Silver	Bronze	Total	Rank
(Switzerland) 1928 St. Moritz	44	0	0	1	1	8
(United States) 1932 Lake Placid	20	0	0	2	2	9
(Nazi Germany) 1936 Garmisch-Partenkirchen	55	3	3	0	6	2
(Switzerland) 1948 St. Moritz	did not participate					
(Norway) 1952 Oslo	53	3	2	2	7	4
1956–1964	as the United Team of Germany					
1968–1988	as West Germany and East Germany					
(France) 1992 Albertville	111	10	10	6	26	1
(Norway) 1994 Lillehammer	112	9	7	8	24	3
(Japan) 1998 Nagano	125	12	9	8	29	1
(United States) 2002 Salt Lake City	157	12	16	8	36	2
(Italy) 2006 Turin	162	11	12	6	29	1
(Canada) 2010 Vancouver	153	10	13	7	30	2
(Russia) 2014 Sochi	153	9	5	5	19	5
(South Korea) 2018 Pyeongchang	153	14	10	7	31	2
(China) 2022 Beijing	149	12	10	5	27	2
(Italy) 2026 Milano Cortina	185	8	10	8	26	5
(France) 2030 French Alps	future event					
(United States) 2034 Utah	future event					
Total (14/25)	1,632	113	107	73	293	3

=== Medals by summer sport ===
Leading in that sport

Sport	Gold	Silver	Bronze	Total
Canoeing	36	21	26	83
Equestrian	32	15	14	61
Rowing	24	16	15	55
Athletics	20	30	37	87
Gymnastics	16	12	15	43
Cycling	15	17	17	49
Swimming	14	18	31	63
Shooting	10	9	5	24
Weightlifting	6	7	7	20
Wrestling	5	12	11	28
Fencing	5	7	9	21
Boxing	4	9	11	24
Field hockey	4	3	4	11
Tennis	3	6	2	11
Sailing	3	5	7	15
Judo	3	4	15	22
Diving	2	8	12	22
Beach volleyball	2	1	1	4
Triathlon	2	1	0	3
Modern pentathlon	2	0	1	3
Handball	1	2	1	4
Marathon swimming	1	2	1	4
Water polo	1	2	0	3
Football	1	1	4	6
3x3 basketball	1	0	0	1
Table tennis	0	4	5	9
Archery	0	3	2	5
Taekwondo	0	1	1	2
Golf	0	1	0	1
Rugby union	0	1	0	1
Totals (30 entries)	213	218	254	685

*This table does not include two medals – one gold and one silver – awarded in the figure skating events at the 1908 Summer Olympics.

=== Medals by winter sport ===
Sport	Gold	Silver	Bronze	Total
Luge	25	13	10	48
Biathlon	21	20	14	55
Bobsleigh	19	13	8	40
Speed skating	13	15	10	38
Alpine skiing	12	10	7	29
Ski jumping	7	7	3	17
Nordic combined	6	6	4	16
Figure skating	4	2	4	10
Cross country skiing	3	10	5	18
Skeleton	2	6	4	12
Snowboarding	1	4	2	7
Freestyle skiing	1	1	1	3
Ice hockey	0	1	1	2
Totals (13 entries)	114	108	73	295

*This table includes two medals – one gold and one silver – awarded in the figure skating events at the 1908 Summer Olympics.

=== Best results in non-medaling sports ===
Summer
Sport	Rank	Athlete	Event & Year
Artistic swimming	14th	Monika Müller	Women's solo in 1992
Artistic swimming	14th	Monika Müller & Margit Schreib	Women's duet in 1992
Badminton	5th	Huaiwen Xu	Women's singles in 2008
Badminton	5th	Michael Fuchs & Birgit Michels	Mixed doubles in 2012
Basketball	4th	Germany men's team	Men's tournament in 2024
BMX freestyle	6th	Lara Lessmann	Women's freestyle in 2020
BMX racing	14th	Nadja Pries	Women's racing in 2016
Karate	5th	Noah Bitsch	Men's -75 kg in 2020
Polo	5th	Germany men's polo national team	Men's tournament in 1936
Skateboarding	9th	Lilly Stoephasius	Women's park in 2020
Sport climbing	9th	Yannick Flohe	Men's combined in 2020
Sport climbing	9th	Yannick Flohe	Men's combined in 2024
Surfing	17th	Leon Glatzer	Men's shortboard in 2020
Surfing	17th	Tim Elter	Men's shortboard in 2024
Surfing	17th	Camilla Kemp	Women's shortboard in 2024
Volleyball	5th	Germany men's national volleyball team	Men's tournament in 2012
Winter
Sport	Rank	Athlete	Event & Year
Curling	5th	Natalie Nessler; Sabine Belkofer; Heike Wieländer; Andrea Stock; Karin Fischer	Women's tournament in 2002
Short track speed skating	5th	Tyson Heung	Men's 500m in 2010
Ski mountaineering	4th	Tatjana Paller	Women's sprint in 2026

=== Combined medals of all German NOCs ===
Germany has competed at the Olympics under five different designations, including as two separate teams at several Games. Sources vary in how they present the medals won by these teams. The table below shows sourced combinations of these teams, when applied to the main table. Saar competed independently in the Summer Olympic games in 1952, but failed to win any medals. Due to most lists only listing medal counts, it's possible but not certain Saar was included as part of Germany in their calculations.

Medals won by Germany at the Summer Olympic Games between 1896 and 2012 (between 1956 and 1964 as the United Team of Germany and between 1968 and 1988 as a sum of medals of West and East Germany)

Medals won by Germany at the Winter Olympic Games between 1928 and 2014 (between 1956 and 1964 as the United Team of Germany and between 1968 and 1988 as sum of medals of West and East Germany)

Medal counts:
status after the 2026 Olympics

	Summer Games					Winter Games					Combined total				
Team (IOC code)	No.	Gold medal	Silver medal	Bronze medal		No.	Gold medal	Silver medal	Bronze medal		No.	Gold medal	Silver medal	Bronze medal	
Germany	18	214	219	254	687	14	113	107	73	293	32	327	326	327	980
Saar	1	0	0	0	0	0	0	0	0	0	1	0	0	0	0
United Team of Germany	3	28	54	36	118	3	8	6	5	19	6	36	60	41	137
West Germany	5	56	67	81	204	6	11	15	13	39	11	67	82	94	243
East Germany	5	153	129	127	409	6	39	36	35	110	11	192	165	162	519
Total	28	451	469	498	1418	23	171	164	126	461	51	622	633	624	1879

Combined IOC codes	No. Games	1st place, gold medalist(s)	2nd place, silver medalist(s)	3rd place, bronze medalist(s)	Combined total
Germany (GER)	32	327	326	327	980
Germany (GER) (EUA)	38	363	386	368	1,117
Germany (GER) (EUA) (FRG)	50	430	468	462	1,360
Germany (GER) (EUA) (FRG) (GDR)	61 (Note: Counting the 10 Games (four at the Summer and six at the Winter Olympics), where both East Germany (GDR) and West Germany (FRG) competed as two appearances.)	622	633	624	1,879

== Hosted Games ==
For the 1972 Summer Olympics in Munich, West Germany, see West Germany at the Olympics.

Games	Host city	Dates	Nations	Participants	Events
1936 Winter Olympics	Garmisch-Partenkirchen	6 – 16 February	28	646	17
1936 Summer Olympics	Berlin	1 – 6 August	49	3,963	129

=== Unsuccessful bids ===
Games	City	Winner of bid
1908 Summer Olympics	Berlin	London, United Kingdom
2000 Summer Olympics	Berlin	Sydney, Australia
2012 Summer Olympics	Leipzig (Note: Not shortlisted into candidate stage)	London, United Kingdom
2018 Winter Olympics	Munich	Pyeongchang, South Korea
2024 Summer Olympics	Hamburg	Paris, France

== See also ==
- List of flag bearers for Germany at the Olympics
- Category:Olympic competitors for Germany
- Germany at the Paralympics
