= United Team of Germany at the Olympics =

- "Olympic" Flag of Germany, defaced with white Olympic rings, used 1960, 1964 (and 1968 by separated teams)
- IOC code: EUA
- Medals Ranked 36th: Gold 36 Silver 60 Bronze 41 Total 137

Summer appearances
- 1956; 1960; 1964

Winter appearances
- 1956; 1960; 1964

Other related appearances
- Germany (1896–1936, 1952, 1992–pres.); Saar (1952); East Germany (1968–1988); West Germany (1968–1988)

The United Team of Germany (German: Gesamtdeutsche Mannschaft) was a combined team of athletes from West Germany and East Germany that competed in the 1956, 1960 and 1964 Winter and Summer Olympic Games. In 1956, the team also included athletes from a third Olympic body, the Saarland Olympic Committee, which had sent a separate team in 1952, but in 1956 was in the process of joining the German National Olympic Committee. This process was completed in February 1957 after the admission of Saarland into West Germany.

== History ==
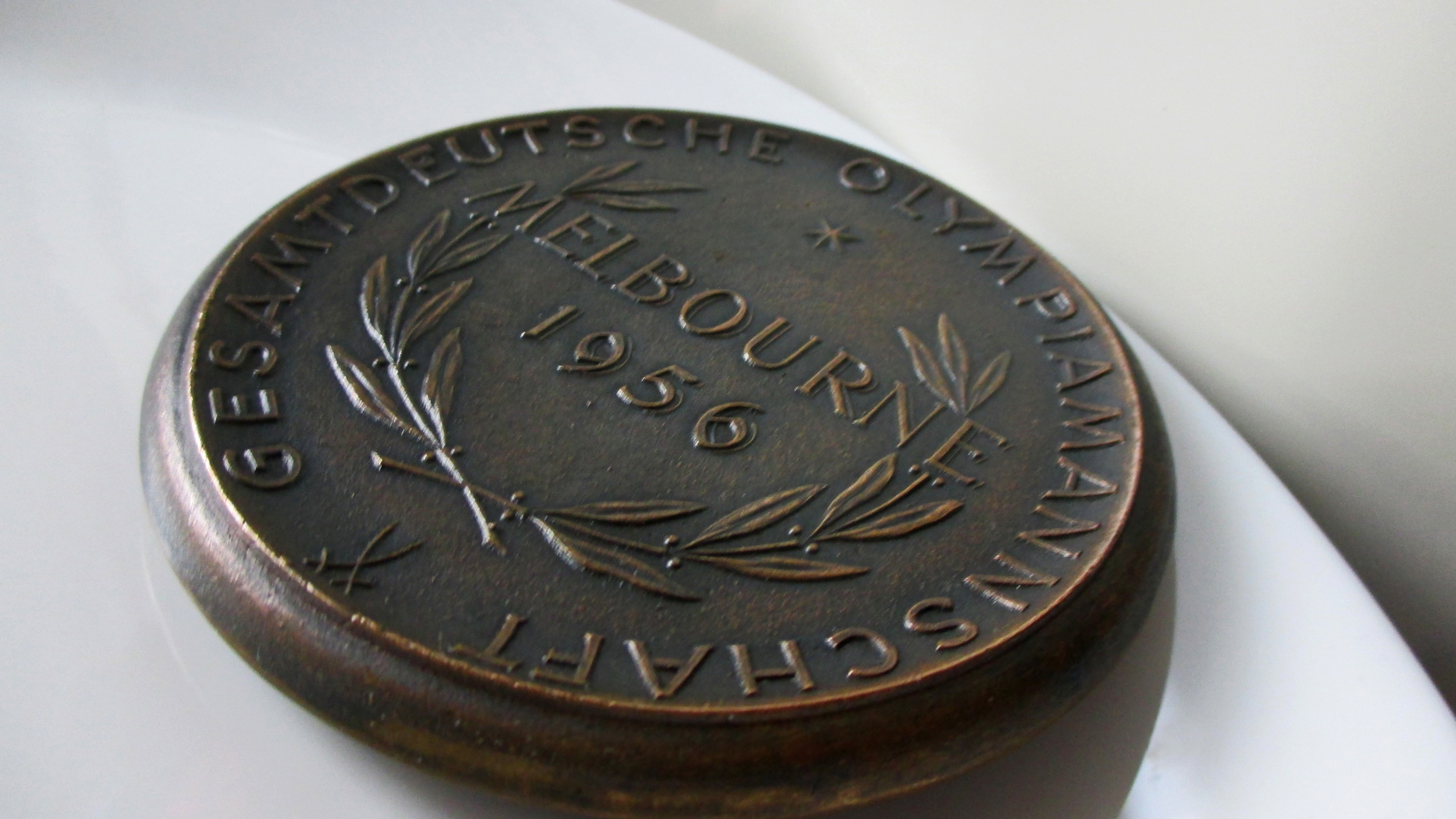
Medal of honour – cast-bronze – German Democratic Republic – "Gesamtdeutsche Olympiamannschaft – Melbourne 1956"

As East Germany had introduced its own national anthem in 1949, Beethoven's Symphony No. 9 melody to Schiller's Ode an die Freude ("Ode to Joy") was played for winning German athletes as a compromise. In 1959, East Germany also introduced an altered black-red-gold tricolour flag of Germany as the flag of East Germany. Thus, a compromise had to be made also for the flag of the unified sports team. It was agreed upon to superimpose the plain flag with additional white Olympic rings. This flag was used from 1960 to 1968.

At the Games of 1956, 1960 and 1964 the team was simply known as "Germany" and the usual country code of GER was used, except at Innsbruck in 1964, when the Austrian hosts used the German language "D" for Deutschland. Yet, the IOC code EUA (from the official French language International Olympic Committee (IOC) designation Équipe Unifiée d'Allemagne) is currently applied retrospectively in the IOC medal database, without further explanation given. Only in 1976 did the IOC start to assign standardized codes. Before that time, the local Organizing Committees of each Olympic Games had chosen codes, often in the local language, resulting in a multitude of codes.

In the 1968 Winter Olympics, East and West German athletes competed as separate teams while still using the compromise Olympic flag and Beethoven anthem. While today listed under the IOC codes of FRG (West) and GDR (East), respectively, in 1968 they were asymmetrically called in French Allemagne (Germany) and Allemagne de l'Est (East Germany), and in Spanish Alemania and Alemania del Este. The codes for Germany (West) were ALL (in Grenoble) and ALE (in Mexico City), and ADE for East Germany. Despite using the same flag as each other, the two delegations did not march as one team in the Parade of Nations (unlike, for example, North and South Korea at the 2000 Summer Olympics Parade of Nations) and each bore a separate instance of the compromise flag. Due to the naming, the two teams marched adjacently.

The separation was completed at the 1972 Winter Olympics with the use of separate flags and anthems. While East Germany would march under their official name "German Democratic Republic" from then onward, West Germany would continue to march under the name "Germany" in 1972 and 1976, switching to their official name "Federal Republic of Germany" from 1980 onward. As a result, the two countries would march adjacent to each other during the 1972 Winter Olympics (in English alphabetical order) and the 1976 Winter Olympics (in German). However, the two countries did not march adjacently during the 1972 Summer Olympics (because West Germany marched last as host) or the 1976 Summer Olympics (due to French order Allemagne and République Démocratique Allemande). By coincidence, the two countries would march adjacently one last time during the 1988 Summer Olympics, due to Korean alphabetical order. East Germany ceased to exist in 1990, when its five states, together with Berlin, joined West Germany in German reunification.

== Timeline of participation ==
| Olympic Year/s | Team(s) | |
|---|---|---|
| 1896–1912 | German Empire | |
| 1920–1924 | denied participation after WWI | |
| 1928–1932 | Germany | |
| 1936 | Germany | |
| 1948 | occupied country after WWII: former German Olympic Committee was dissolved | |
| 1952 W | Germany | |
| 1952 S | Germany | |
| 1952 S | Saar | East Germany did not participate |
| 1956–1964 | United Team of Germany (EUA) | |
| 1968–1988 | West Germany (FRG) | East Germany (GDR) |
| 1992–present | Germany | |

== Medal tables ==
=== Medals by Summer Games ===
| Games | Athletes | Gold | Silver | Bronze | Total | Rank |
| 1956 Melbourne | 158 | 6 | 13 | 7 | 26 | 7 |
| 1960 Rome | 293 | 12 | 19 | 11 | 42 | 4 |
| 1964 Tokyo | 337 | 10 | 22 | 18 | 50 | 4 |
| Total | | 28 | 54 | 36 | 118 | 36 |

=== Medals by Winter Games ===
| Games | Athletes | Gold | Silver | Bronze | Total | Rank |
| 1956 Cortina d'Ampezzo | 63 | 1 | 0 | 1 | 2 | 9 |
| 1960 Squaw Valley | 74 | 4 | 3 | 1 | 8 | 2 |
| 1964 Innsbruck | 96 | 3 | 3 | 3 | 9 | 6 |
| Total | | 8 | 6 | 5 | 19 | 23 |

=== Medals by summer sport ===
| Sport | Gold | Silver | Bronze | Total |
|---|---|---|---|---|
| Equestrian | 5 | 5 | 4 | 14 |
| Athletics | 4 | 18 | 8 | 30 |
| Canoeing | 4 | 5 | 2 | 11 |
| Rowing | 4 | 4 | 1 | 9 |
| Diving | 3 | 1 | 0 | 4 |
| Swimming | 1 | 5 | 6 | 12 |
| Wrestling | 1 | 5 | 3 | 9 |
| Cycling | 1 | 4 | 2 | 7 |
| Boxing | 1 | 3 | 2 | 6 |
| Fencing | 1 | 1 | 2 | 4 |
| Gymnastics | 1 | 1 | 1 | 3 |
| Sailing | 1 | 1 | 1 | 3 |
| Shooting | 1 | 0 | 1 | 2 |
| Judo | 0 | 1 | 1 | 2 |
| Field hockey | 0 | 0 | 1 | 1 |
| Football | 0 | 0 | 1 | 1 |
| Totals (16 entries) | 28 | 54 | 36 | 118 |

=== Medals by winter sport ===
| Sport | Gold | Silver | Bronze | Total |
|---|---|---|---|---|
| Luge | 2 | 2 | 1 | 5 |
| Alpine skiing | 2 | 1 | 2 | 5 |
| Figure skating | 1 | 2 | 0 | 3 |
| Speed skating | 1 | 1 | 0 | 2 |
| Nordic combined | 1 | 0 | 1 | 2 |
| Ski jumping | 1 | 0 | 1 | 2 |
| Totals (6 entries) | 8 | 6 | 5 | 19 |

== See also ==
- Germany at the Summer Olympics
- Germany at the Winter Olympics
- Unified Korean sporting teams
- Unified Team (disambiguation)
