= List of Olympic male artistic gymnasts for Germany =

Gymnastics events have been staged at the Olympic Games since 1896. German male gymnasts have participated in every Summer Olympics except 1920, 1924, 1928, 1932. Additionally Germany was banned from participating in the 1948 Summer Olympics. At the 1956, 1960, and 1964 Olympic Games athletes from East and West Germany competed as the United Team of Germany. From 1968 through 1988 East Germany and West Germany competed separately. Athletes representing East Germany and West Germany are not included on this list.

Fabian Hambüchen and Andreas Toba have represented Germany at the Olympics the most with four appearances; Andreas Wecker also competed in four Olympics although he represented East Germany in 1988 and Germany at his three subsequent Olympic Games. Marcel Nguyen and Lukas Dauser have each represented Germany at three Olympic Games.

== Gymnasts ==
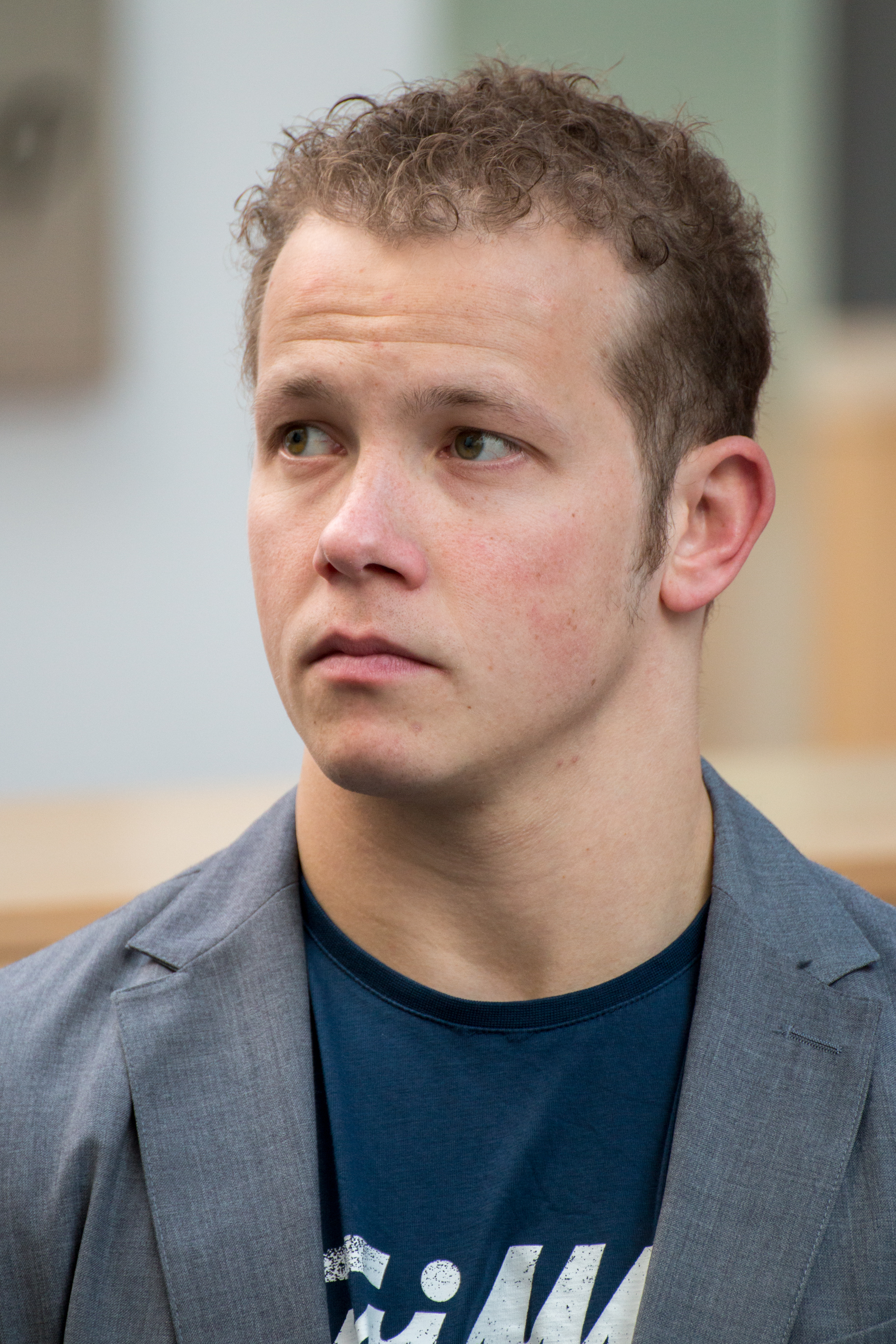
Fabian Hambüchen

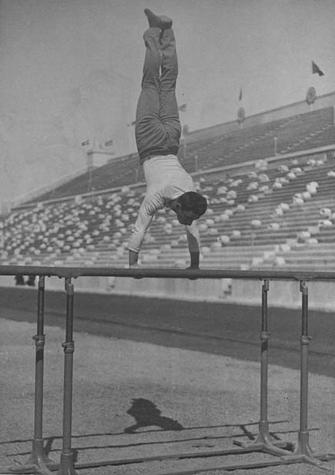
Alfred Flatow at the 1896 Olympics

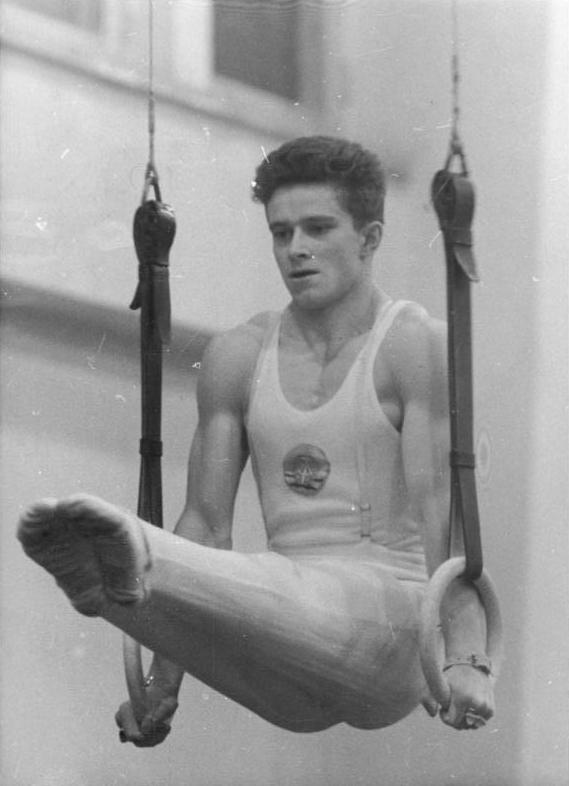
Siegfried Fülle

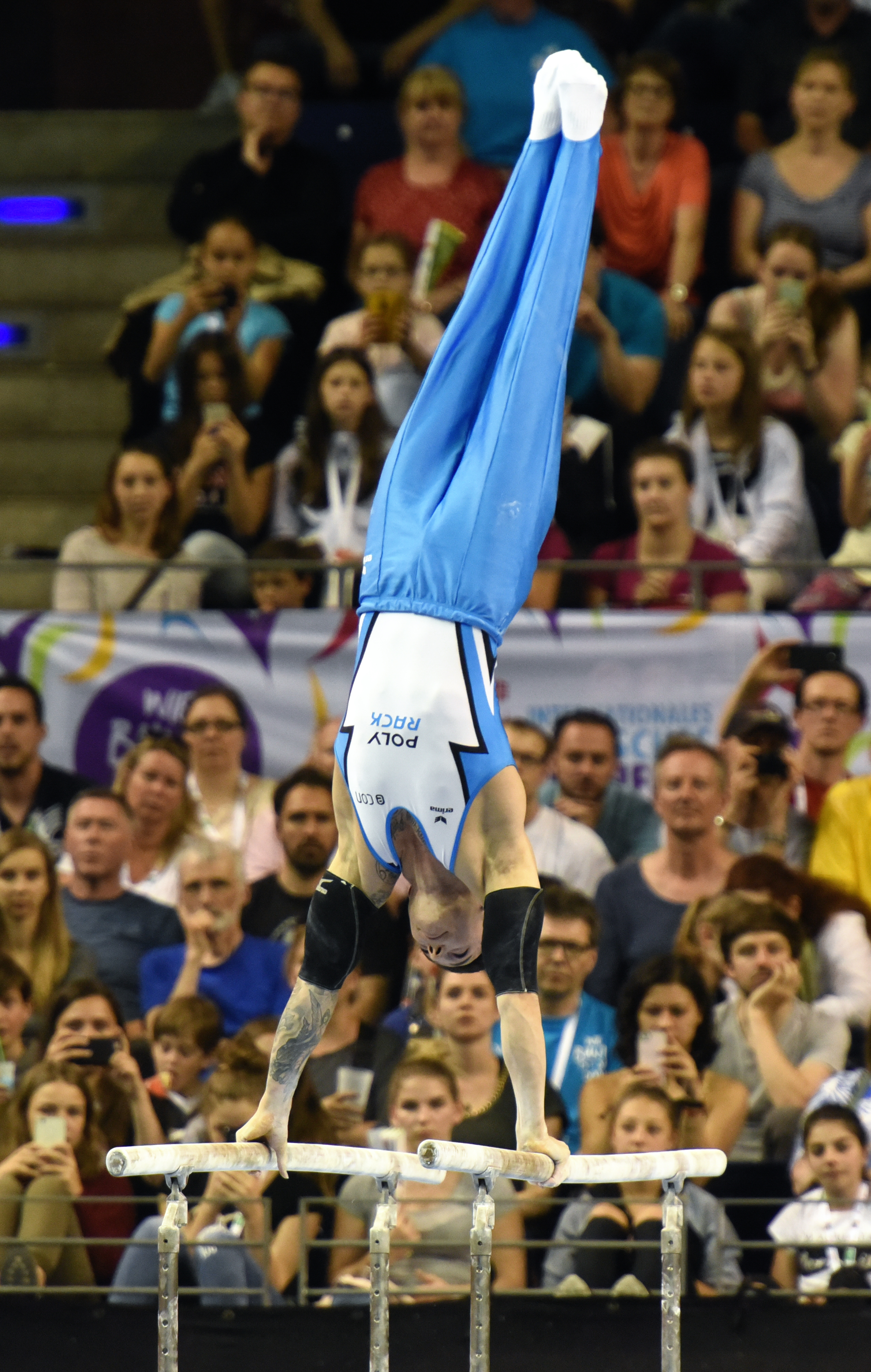
Marcel Nguyen

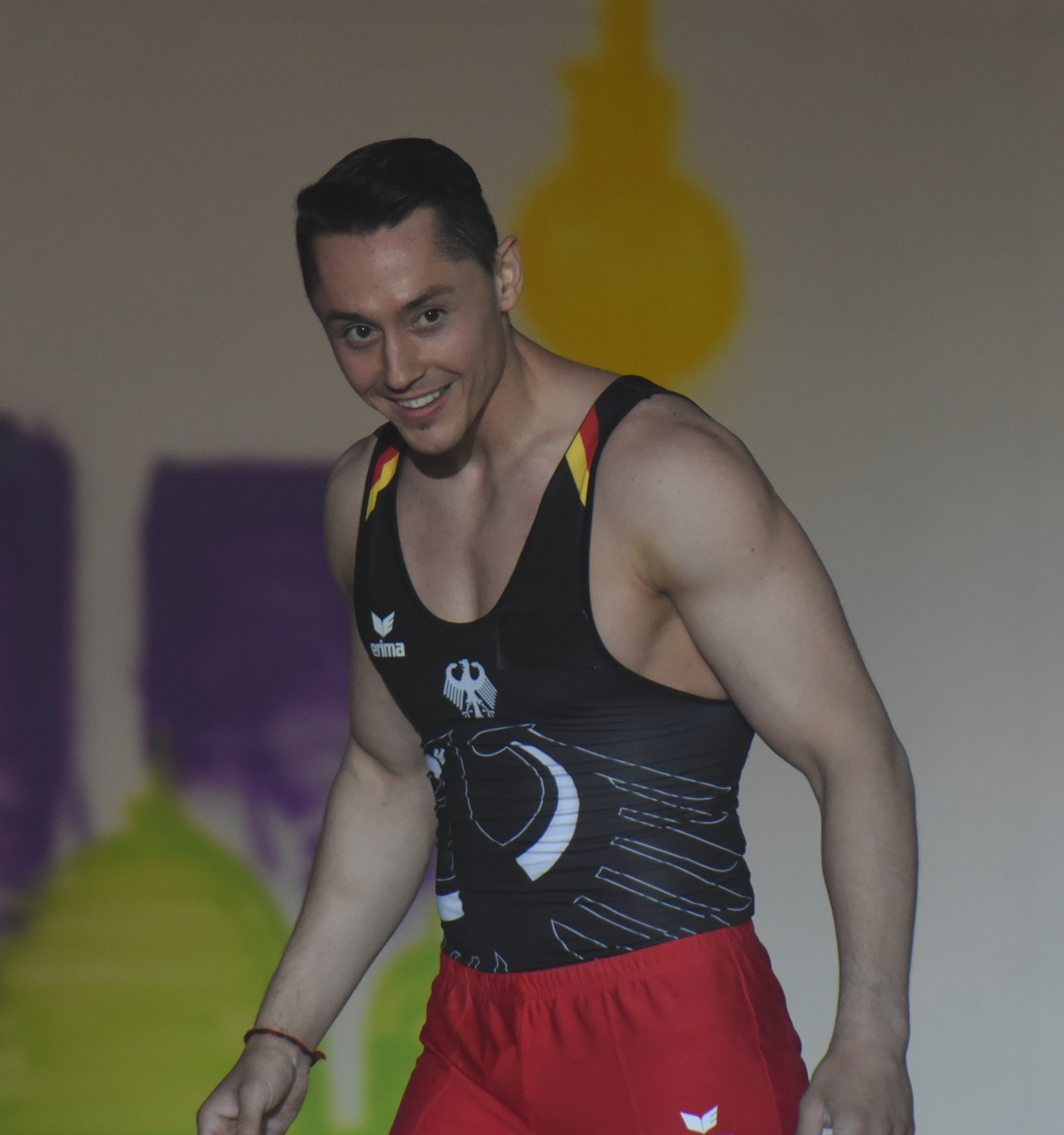
Andreas Toba

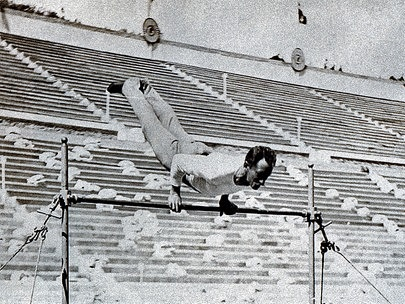
Hermann Weingärtner at the 1896 Olympics

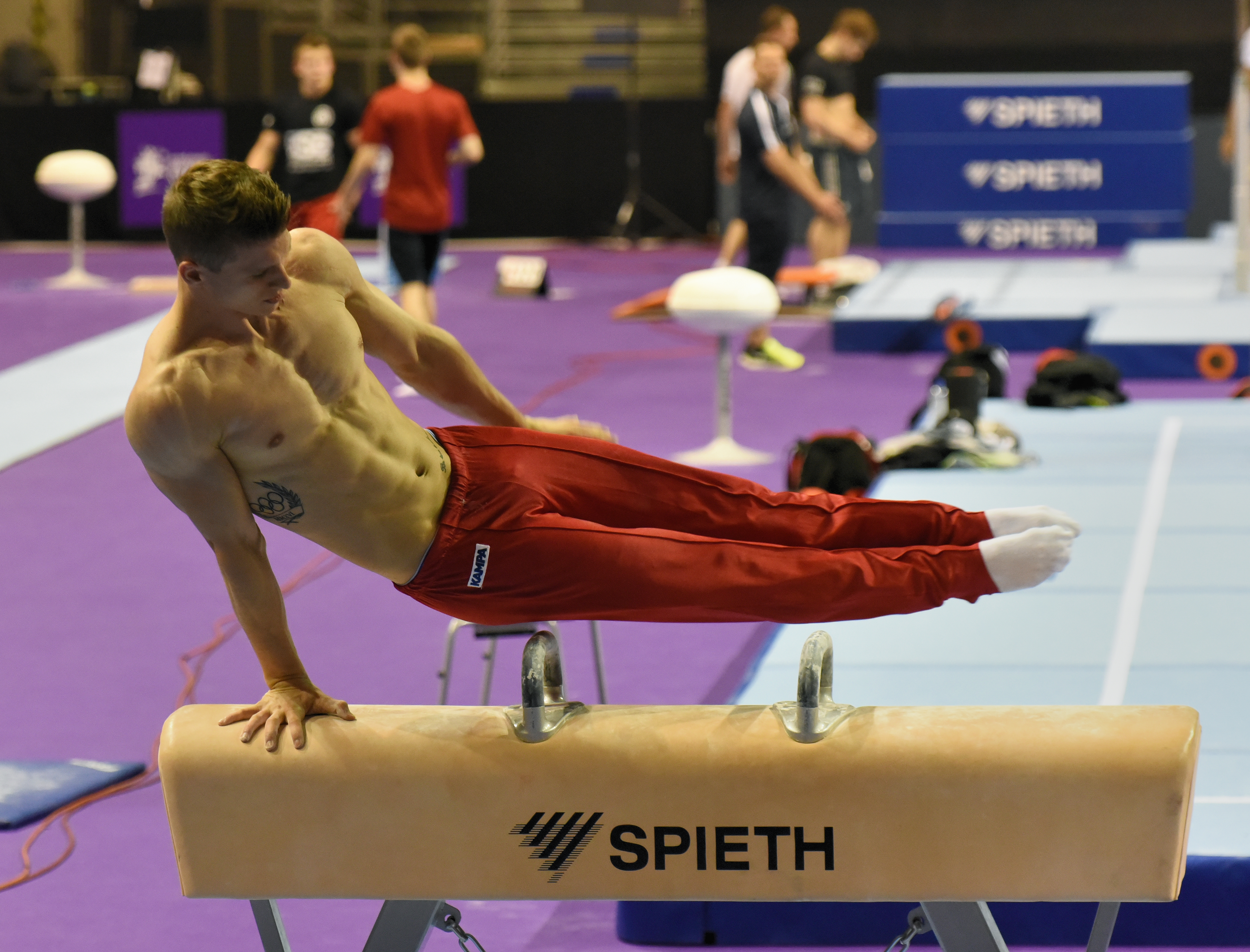
Lukas Dauser

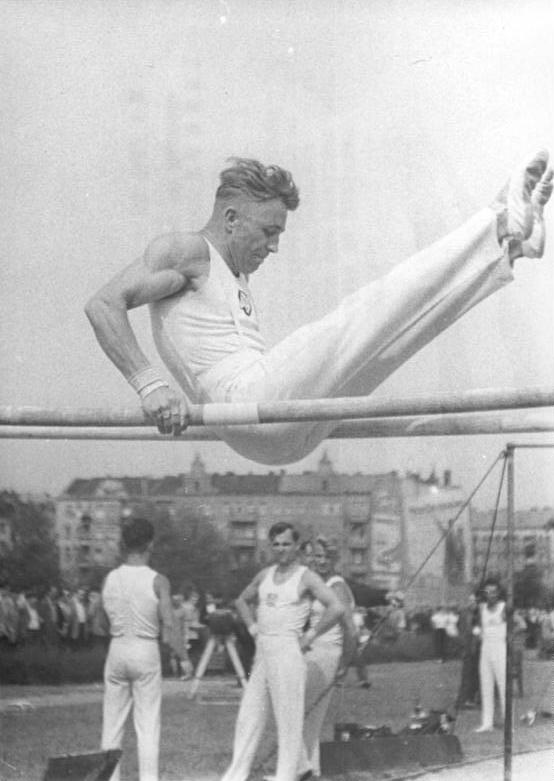
Günter Nachtigall

Gymnast	Years	Ref.
Franz Abbé	1900	
Thomas Andergassen	2004, 2008	
Helmut Bantz	1952, 1956	
Franz Beckert	1936	
Valery Belenky	1996	
Uwe Billerbeck	2000	
Konrad Böcker	1896	
Karl Borchert	1908	
Philipp Boy	2008, 2012	
Pascal Brendel	2024	
Andreas Bretschneider	2016	
Wilhelm Brülle	1912	
Ralf Büchner	1992	
Johannes Buder	1912	
Christian Busch	1904	
Fritz Danner	1900	
Lukas Dauser	2016, 2020, 2024	
Adalbert Dickhut	1952	
Nils Dunkel	2020, 2024	
Timo Eder	2024	
August Ehrich	1908	
Walter Engelmann	1912	
Matthias Fahrig	2004	
Paul Fischer	1908	
Alfred Flatow	1896	
Gustav Flatow	1896, 1900	
Mario Franke	1992	
Konrad Frey	1936	
Karl-Heinz Friedrich	1960	
Siegfried Fülle	1960, 1964	
Philipp Fürst	1960, 1964	
Eugen Fürstenberger	1900	
Richard Genserowski	1900	
Arno Glockauer	1912	
Fabian Hambüchen	2004, 2008, 2012, 2016	
Philipp Herder	2020	
Georg Hilmar	1896	
Fritz Hofmann	1896	
Walter Jesinghaus	1912	
Karl Jordan	1912	
Robert Juckel	2004, 2008	
Georg Karth	1908	
Wilhelm Kaufmann	1908	
Jakob Kiefer	1952, 1956	
Robert Klein	1956	
Erwin Koppe	1960, 1964	
Rudolf Körner	1912	
Carl Körting	1908	
Klaus Köste	1964	
Josef Krämer	1908	
Sebastian Krimmer	2012	
Sylvio Kroll	1992	
Erwin Kurtz	1900	
Sven Kwiatkowski	2004	
Wilhelm Lemke	1904	
Günter Lyhs	1960, 1964	
Fritz Manteuffel	1896, 1900	
Otto Meyer	1900	
Ernst Mohr	1904	
Günter Nachtigall	1960	
Oscar Naumann	1900	
Karl Neukirch	1896	
Marcel Nguyen	2008, 2012, 2016	
Jan-Peter Nikiferow	1996, 2000	
Dimitrij Nonin	2000	
Julius Nuninger	1900	
Karsten Oelsch	1996	
Friedel Overwien	1952	
Heinrich Pahner	1912	
Hugo Peitsch	1900, 1904	
Hans Pfann	1952, 1956	
Sergei Pfeifer	2000, 2004	
Kurt Reichenbach	1912	
Johannes Reuschle	1912	
Carl Richter	1912	
Richard Röstel	1896	
Hans Roth	1912	
Emil Rotong	1900	
Fritz Sauer	1900	
Gustav Schuft	1896	
Carl Schuhmann	1896	
Alfred Schwarzmann	1936, 1952	
Adolf Seebaß	1912	
Heinrich Siebenhaar	1908	
Eberhard Sorge	1912	
Alexander Sperling	1912	
Eugen Spiridonov	2008	
Alfred Staats	1912	
Willi Stadel	1936	
Innozenz Stangl	1936	
Walter Steffens	1936	
Curt Steuernagel	1908	
Adolf Tannert	1900	
Sven Tippelt	1992	
Andreas Toba	2012, 2016, 2020, 2024	
Marius Tobă	1996, 2000	
Rene Tschernitschek	2000	
Matthias Volz	1936	
Oliver Walther	1992, 1996	
Adolph Weber	1904	
Peter Weber	1964	
Wilhelm Weber	1904, 1908	
Andreas Wecker	1992, 1996, 2000	
Hermann Weingärtner	1896	
Hans Werner	1912	
Erich Wied	1952, 1956	
Theo Wied	1952, 1956	
Carl Wiegand	1900	
Otto Wiegand	1904	
Ernst Winter	1936	
Friedrich Wolf	1908	
Martin Worm	1912	

== Medalists ==
Medal	Name	Year	Event
Gold	Böcker, A. Flatow, G. Flatow, Hilmar, Hofmann, Manteuffel, Neukirch, Röstel, Schuft, Schuhmann, Weingärtner	(Greece) 1896 Athens	Men's team parallel bars
Gold	Böcker, A. Flatow, G. Flatow, Hilmar, Hofmann, Manteuffel, Neukirch, Röstel, Schuft, Schuhmann, Weingärtner	(Greece) 1896 Athens	Men's team horizontal bar
Gold	Carl Schuhmann	(Greece) 1896 Athens	Men's vault
Bronze	Hermann Weingärtner	(Greece) 1896 Athens	Men's vault
Silver	Hermann Weingärtner	(Greece) 1896 Athens	Men's pommel horse
Silver	Hermann Weingärtner	(Greece) 1896 Athens	Men's rings
Gold	Hermann Weingärtner	(Greece) 1896 Athens	Men's horizontal bar
Silver	Alfred Flatow	(Greece) 1896 Athens	Men's horizontal bar
Gold	Alfred Flatow	(Greece) 1896 Athens	Men's parallel bars
Bronze	Fritz Hofmann	(Greece) 1896 Athens	Men's rope climbing
Silver	Wilhelm Weber	(United States) 1904 St. Louis	Men's all-around
Gold	Beckert, Frey, Schwarzmann, Stadel, Stangl, Steffens, Volz, Winter	(Germany) 1936 Berlin	Men's team
Gold	Alfred Schwarzmann	(Germany) 1936 Berlin	Men's all-around
Bronze	Konrad Frey	(Germany) 1936 Berlin	Men's all-around
Bronze	Alfred Schwarzmann	(Germany) 1936 Berlin	Men's floor exercise
Gold	Konrad Frey	(Germany) 1936 Berlin	Men's pommel horse
Bronze	Matthias Volz	(Germany) 1936 Berlin	Men's rings
Gold	Alfred Schwarzmann	(Germany) 1936 Berlin	Men's vault
Bronze	Matthias Volz	(Germany) 1936 Berlin	Men's vault
Gold	Konrad Frey	(Germany) 1936 Berlin	Men's parallel bars
Bronze	Alfred Schwarzmann	(Germany) 1936 Berlin	Men's parallel bars
Silver	Konrad Frey	(Germany) 1936 Berlin	Men's horizontal bar
Bronze	Alfred Schwarzmann	(Germany) 1936 Berlin	Men's horizontal bar
Silver	Alfred Schwarzmann	(Finland) 1952 Helsinki	Men's horizontal bar
Gold	Helmut Bantz	(Australia) 1956 Melbourne	Men's vault
Bronze	Fülle, Fürst, Koppe, Köste, Lyhs, Weber	(Japan) 1964 Tokyo	Men's team
Bronze	Andreas Wecker	(Spain) 1992 Barcelona	Men's pommel horse
Bronze	Andreas Wecker	(Spain) 1992 Barcelona	Men's rings
Silver	Andreas Wecker	(Spain) 1992 Barcelona	Men's horizontal bar
Gold	Andreas Wecker	(United States) 1996 Atlanta	Men's horizontal bar
Bronze	Fabian Hambüchen	(China) 2008 Beijing	Men's horizontal bar
Silver	Marcel Nguyen	(United Kingdom) 2012 London	Men's all-around
Silver	Marcel Nguyen	(United Kingdom) 2012 London	Men's parallel bars
Silver	Fabian Hambüchen	(United Kingdom) 2012 London	Men's horizontal bar
Gold	Fabian Hambüchen	(Brazil) 2016 Rio de Janeiro	Men's horizontal bar
Silver	Lukas Dauser	(Japan) 2020 Tokyo	Men's parallel bars

== See also ==
- List of Olympic female artistic gymnasts for Germany
