= List of 1896 Summer Olympics medal winners =

This article lists the athletes who won a medal (awarded retrospectively by the International Olympic Committee) to 1896 Summer Olympics in Athens (Greece).

== Athletics ==
Event	Gold	Silver	Bronze
100 metres	Thomas Burke; United States	Fritz Hofmann; Germany	Francis Lane; United States
100 metres	Thomas Burke; United States	Fritz Hofmann; Germany	Alajos Szokolyi; Hungary
400 metres	Thomas Burke; United States	Herbert Jamison; United States	Charles Gmelin; Great Britain
800 metres	Edwin Flack; Australia	Nándor Dáni; Hungary	Dimitrios Golemis; Greece
1500 metres	Edwin Flack; Australia	Arthur Blake; United States	Albin Lermusiaux; France
110 meter hurdles	Thomas Curtis; United States	Grantley Goulding; Great Britain	none awarded
Marathon	Spyridon Louis; Greece	Charilaos Vasilakos; Greece	Gyula Kellner; Hungary
High jump	Ellery Clark; United States	James Connolly; United States	none awarded
High jump	Ellery Clark; United States	Robert Garrett; United States	none awarded
Pole vault	William Hoyt; United States	Albert Tyler; United States	Evangelos Damaskos; Greece
Pole vault	William Hoyt; United States	Albert Tyler; United States	Ioannis Theodoropoulos; Greece
Long jump	Ellery Clark; United States	Robert Garrett; United States	James Connolly; United States
Triple jump	James Connolly; United States	Alexandre Tuffère; France	Ioannis Persakis; Greece
Shot put	Robert Garrett; United States	Miltiadis Gouskos; Greece	Georgios Papasideris; Greece
Discus throw	Robert Garrett; United States	Panagiotis Paraskevopoulos; Greece	Sotirios Versis; Greece

== Cycling ==
Event	Gold	Silver	Bronze
Road race	Aristidis Konstantinidis; Greece	August von Gödrich; Germany	Edward Battell; Great Britain
Sprint	Paul Masson; France	Stamatios Nikolopoulos; Greece	Léon Flameng; France
Time trial	Paul Masson; France	Stamatios Nikolopoulos; Greece	Adolf Schmal; Austria
10 km	Paul Masson; France	Léon Flameng; France	Adolf Schmal; Austria
100 km	Léon Flameng; France	Georgios Kolettis; Greece	not awarded
12 hour race	Adolf Schmal; Austria	Frederick Keeping; Great Britain	not awarded

== Fencing ==
Event	Gold	Silver	Bronze
Foil	Eugène-Henri Gravelotte; France	Henri Callot; France	Periklis Pierrakos-Mavromichalis; Greece
Foil	Eugène-Henri Gravelotte; France	Henri Callot; France	Athanasios Vouros; Greece
Masters foil	Leonidas Pyrgos; Greece	Joanni Perronet; France	not awarded
Sabre	Ioannis Georgiadis; Greece	Telemachos Karakalos; Greece	Holger Nielsen; Denmark

== Gymnastics ==
Event	Gold	Silver	Bronze
Horizontal bar	Hermann Weingärtner; Germany	Alfred Flatow; Germany	not awarded
Parallel bars	Alfred Flatow; Germany	Louis Zutter; Switzerland	not awarded
Pommel horse	Louis Zutter; Switzerland	Hermann Weingärtner; Germany	not awarded
Rings	Ioannis Mitropoulos; Greece	Hermann Weingärtner; Germany	Petros Persakis; Greece
Rope climbing	Nikolaos Andriakopoulos; Greece	Thomas Xenakis; Greece	Fritz Hofmann; Germany
Vault	Carl Schuhmann; Germany	Louis Zutter; Switzerland	Hermann Weingärtner; Germany
Team parallel bars	Germany; Conrad Böcker; Alfred Flatow; Gustav Flatow; Georg Hilmar; Fritz Hofmann; Fritz Manteuffel; Karl Neukirch; Richard Röstel; Gustav Schuft; Carl Schuhmann; Hermann Weingärtner	Greece; Nikolaos Andriakopoulos; Sotirios Athanasopoulos; Petros Persakis; Thomas Xenakis	Greece; Ioannis Chrysafis; Ioannis Mitropoulos; Dimitrios Loundras; Filippos Karvelas
Team horizontal bar	Germany; Conrad Böcker; Alfred Flatow; Gustav Flatow; Georg Hilmar; Fritz Hofmann; Fritz Manteuffel; Karl Neukirch; Richard Röstel; Gustav Schuft; Carl Schuhmann; Hermann Weingärtner	not awarded	not awarded

== Shooting ==
Event	Gold	Silver	Bronze
200 metre military rifle	Pantelis Karasevdas; Greece	Pavlos Pavlidis; Greece	Nikolaos Trikoupis; Greece
300 metre free rifle, three positions	Georgios Orphanidis; Greece	Ioannis Frangoudis; Greece	Viggo Jensen; Denmark
25 metre military pistol	John Paine; United States	Sumner Paine; United States	Nikolaos Morakis; Greece
25 metre rapid fire pistol	Ioannis Frangoudis; Greece	Georgios Orfanidis; Greece	Holger Nielsen; Denmark
30 metre free pistol	Sumner Paine; United States	Holger Nielsen; Denmark	Ioannis Frangoudis; Greece

== Swimming ==
Event	Gold	Silver	Bronze
100 m freestyle	Alfréd Hajós; Hungary	Otto Herschmann; Austria	not awarded
500 m freestyle	Paul Neumann; Austria	Antonios Pepanos; Greece	Efstathios Chorafas; Greece
1200 m freestyle	Alfréd Hajós; Hungary	Ioannis Andreou; Greece	none awarded
Sailors 100 m freestyle	Ioannis Malokinis; Greece	Spyridon Chazapis; Greece	Dimitrios Drivas; Greece

== Tennis ==
Event	Gold	Silver	Bronze
Men’s singles	John Pius Boland; Great Britain	Dionysios Kasdaglis; Greece	Konstantinos Paspatis; Greece
Men’s singles	John Pius Boland; Great Britain	Dionysios Kasdaglis; Greece	Momcsilló Tapavicza; Hungary
Men's doubles	Mixed team John Pius Boland; Great Britain; Friedrich Traun; Germany	Greece; Demetrios Petrokokkinos; Dionysios Kasdaglis	Mixed team Teddy Flack; Australia; George S. Robertson; Great Britain

== Weightlifting ==
Event	Gold	Silver	Bronze
One hand lift	Launceston Elliot; Great Britain	Viggo Jensen; Denmark	Alexandros Nikolopoulos; Greece
Two hand lift	Viggo Jensen; Denmark	Launceston Elliot; Great Britain	Sotirios Versis; Greece

== Wrestling ==
Event	Gold	Silver	Bronze
Greco-Roman	Carl Schuhmann; Germany	Georgios Tsitas; Greece	Stefanos Christopoulos; Greece

== See also ==
- 1896 Summer Olympics medal table
