= Gymnastics at the 1896 Summer Olympics – Men's parallel bars =

Olympic gymnastics event

Men's parallel bars at the Games of the I Olympiad
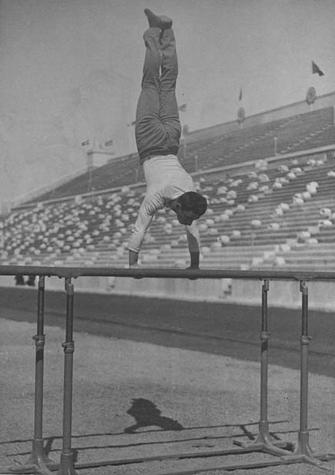
- Alfred Flatow competing on the parallel bars
- Venue: Panathinaiko Stadium
- Date: April 10, 1896
- Competitors: 18 from 6 nations

Medalists
1st place, gold medalist(s)		Alfred Flatow; Germany
2nd place, silver medalist(s)		Louis Zutter; Switzerland

The men's parallel bars was one of eight gymnastics events on the Gymnastics at the 1896 Summer Olympics programme. The parallel bars event was held on 10 April, the seventh gymnastics event to be held. 18 gymnasts from six nations competed, with the judges announcing Alfred Flatow as the winner and Louis Zutter as the runner-up.

== Background ==
This was the first appearance of the event, which is one of the five apparatus events held every time there were apparatus events at the Summer Olympics (no apparatus events were held in 1900, 1908, 1912, or 1920). The field consisted of 10 Germans and 8 gymnasts from 5 other nations.

== Competition format ==
Judges awarded the prizes, but little is known of the scoring and rankings.

== Schedule ==
The men's parallel bars was held in the morning of the fifth day of events, having been moved from the fourth day as the other gymnastics events went too long to finish the full programme.

Date		Time	Round
Gregorian	Julian	Time	Round
Friday, 10 April 1896	Friday, 29 March 1896	10:00	Final

== Results ==
Rank	Gymnast	Nation
1st place, gold medalist(s)	Alfred Flatow	Germany
2nd place, silver medalist(s)	Louis Zutter	Switzerland
3–18	Konrad Böcker	Germany
3–18	Charles Champaud	Bulgaria
3–18	Gustav Flatow	Germany
3–18	Adolphe Grisel	France
3–18	Georg Hilmar	Germany
3–18	Gyula Kakas	Hungary
3–18	Filippos Karvelas	Greece
3–18	Fritz Manteuffel	Germany
3–18	Ioannis Mitropoulos	Greece
3–18	Karl Neukirch	Germany
3–18	Antonios Papaioannou	Greece
3–18	Richard Röstel	Germany
3–18	Gustav Schuft	Germany
3–18	Carl Schuhmann	Germany
3–18	Desiderius Wein	Hungary
3–18	Hermann Weingärtner	Germany

== Sources ==
- Lampros, S.P.; Polites, N.G.; De Coubertin, Pierre; Philemon, P.J.; Anninos, C. (1897). The Olympic Games: BC 776 – AD 1896. Athens: Charles Beck. (Digitally available at )
- Mallon, Bill; Widlund, Ture (1998). The 1896 Olympic Games. Results for All Competitors in All Events, with Commentary. Jefferson: McFarland. ISBN 0-7864-0379-9. (Excerpt available at )
- Smith, Michael Llewellyn (2004). Olympics in Athens 1896. The Invention of the Modern Olympic Games. London: Profile Books. ISBN 1-86197-342-X.
