= Gymnastics at the 1896 Summer Olympics – Men's horizontal bar =

Olympic gymnastics event

Men's horizontal bar at the Games of the I Olympiad
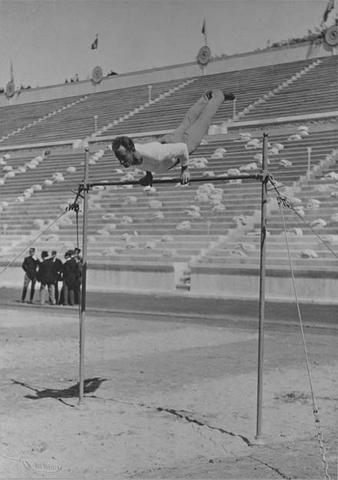
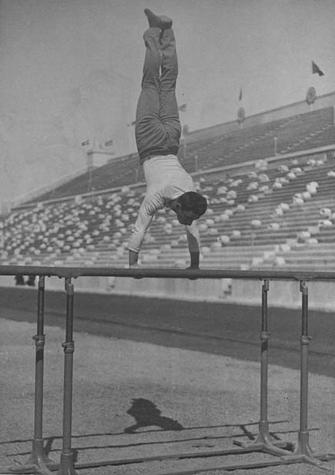
- Hermann Weingärtner (gold) Alfred Flatow (silver)
- Venue: Panathinaiko Stadium
- Date: April 9, 1896
- Competitors: 15 from 4 nations

Medalists
1st place, gold medalist(s)		Hermann Weingärtner; Germany
2nd place, silver medalist(s)		Alfred Flatow; Germany

The men's horizontal bar was one of eight gymnastics events on the Gymnastics at the 1896 Summer Olympics programme. It was held on 9 April, as the sixth gymnastics event. 15 athletes from four nations entered the competition. Two winners were announced, with Hermann Weingärtner winning his first individual gold medal, which was added to his two team gold medals and his three other individual medals. His countryman, Alfred Flatow, won his first individual medal.

== Background ==
This was the first appearance of the event, which is one of the five apparatus events held every time there were apparatus events at the Summer Olympics (no apparatus events were held in 1900, 1908, 1912, or 1920). The field consisted of 10 Germans and 5 gymnasts from 3 other nations.

== Competition format ==
Judges awarded the prizes, but little is known of the scoring and rankings.

== Schedule ==
The men's parallel bars was held in the evening of the fourth day of events. It was the sixth gymnastics event held that day, and went late enough that the remaining two had to be postponed until the next day.

Date		Time	Round
Gregorian	Julian	Time	Round
Thursday, 9 April 1896	Thursday, 28 March 1896		Final

== Results ==
Schuhmann performed for the audience, rather than the judges, with "circus tricks."

Rank	Gymnast	Nation
1st place, gold medalist(s)	Hermann Weingärtner	Germany
2nd place, silver medalist(s)	Alfred Flatow	Germany
3–15	Konrad Böcker	Germany
3–15	Gustav Flatow	Germany
3–15	Georg Hilmar	Germany
3–15	Gyula Kakas	Hungary
3–15	Fritz Manteuffel	Germany
3–15	Karl Neukirch	Germany
3–15	Antonios Papaioannou	Greece
3–15	Richard Röstel	Germany
3–15	Gustav Schuft	Germany
3–15	Carl Schuhmann	Germany
3–15	Leonidas Tsiklitiras	Greece
3–15	Desiderius Wein	Hungary
3–15	Louis Zutter	Switzerland

== Sources ==
- Lampros, S.P.; Polites, N.G.; De Coubertin, Pierre; Philemon, P.J.; Anninos, C. (1897). The Olympic Games: BC 776 – AD 1896. Athens: Charles Beck. (Digitally available at )
- Mallon, Bill; Widlund, Ture (1998). The 1896 Olympic Games. Results for All Competitors in All Events, with Commentary. Jefferson: McFarland. ISBN 0-7864-0379-9. (Excerpt available at )
- Smith, Michael Llewellyn (2004). Olympics in Athens 1896. The Invention of the Modern Olympic Games. London: Profile Books. ISBN 1-86197-342-X.
