= Germany at the 1896 Summer Olympics =

- Flag of the German Empire
- IOC code: GER
- NOC: National Olympic Committee for Germany

in Athens, Greece April 6–15, 1896
- Competitors: 19 in 6 sports and 24 events
- Medals Ranked 3rd: Gold 6 Silver 5 Bronze 2 Total 13

Summer Olympics appearances (overview)
- 1896; 1900; 1904; 1908; 1912; 1920–1924; 1928; 1932; 1936; 1948; 1952; 1956–1988; 1992; 1996; 2000; 2004; 2008; 2012; 2016; 2020; 2024

Other related appearances
- 1906 Intercalated Games –––– Saar (1952); United Team of Germany (1956–1964); East Germany (1968–1988); West Germany (1968–1988)

Germany competed at the 1896 Summer Olympics in Athens, Greece. The Germans were the third most successful nation in terms of both gold medals (6 plus 1 as part of a mixed team) and total medals (13). Gymnastics was the sport in which Germany excelled. The German team had 19 athletes. The Germans had 75 entries in 26 events (of which 48 entries were in the 8 gymnastics events), taking 13 medals.

== Medalists ==
The following competitors won medals at the games. In the discipline sections below, the medalists' names are bolded. Medals awarded to participants of mixed-NOC teams are represented in italics. These medals are not counted towards the individual NOC medal tally.

Medal	Name	Sport	Event	Date
Gold	Hermann Weingärtner	Gymnastics	Men's horizontal bar	April 9
Gold	Alfred Flatow	Gymnastics	Men's parallel bars	April 10
Gold	Conrad Böcker, Alfred Flatow, Gustav Flatow, Georg Hilmar, Fritz Hofmann, Fritz Manteuffel, Karl Neukirch, Richard Röstel, Gustav Schuft, Carl Schuhmann, Hermann Weingärtner	Gymnastics	Men's team parallel bars	April 9
Gold	Conrad Böcker, Alfred Flatow, Gustav Flatow, Georg Hilmar, Fritz Hofmann, Fritz Manteuffel, Karl Neukirch, Richard Röstel, Gustav Schuft, Carl Schuhmann, Hermann Weingärtner	Gymnastics	Men's team horizontal bar	April 9
Gold	Carl Schuhmann	Gymnastics	Men's vault	April 9
Gold	Friedrich Traun	Tennis	Men's doubles	April 9
Gold	Carl Schuhmann	Wrestling	Men's Greco-Roman	April 11
Silver	Fritz Hofmann	Athletics	Men's 100 m	April 10
Silver	August von Gödrich	Cycling	Men's road race	April 12
Silver	Alfred Flatow	Gymnastics	Men's horizontal bar	April 9
Silver	Hermann Weingärtner	Gymnastics	Men's pommel horse	April 9
Silver	Hermann Weingärtner	Gymnastics	Men's rings	April 9
Bronze	Fritz Hofmann	Gymnastics	Men's rope climbing	April 10
Bronze	Hermann Weingärtner	Gymnastics	Men's vault	April 9

Medals by sport
Sport	1st place, gold medalist(s)	2nd place, silver medalist(s)	3rd place, bronze medalist(s)	Total
Gymnastics	5	3	2	**10**
Wrestling	1	0	0	**1**
Athletics	0	1	0	**1**
Cycling	0	1	0	**1**
Total	6	5	2	13

=== Multiple medalists ===
The following competitors won multiple medals at the 1896 Olympic Games.

Name	Medal	Sport	Event
Carl Schuhmann	Gold; Gold; Gold; Gold	Gymnastics; Wrestling	Men's team parallel bars Men's team horizontal bar Men's vault Men's Greco-Roman
Hermann Weingärtner	Gold; Gold; Gold; Silver; Silver; Bronze	Gymnastics	Men's team parallel bars Men's team horizontal bar Men's horizontal bar Men's pommel horse Men's rings Men's vault
Alfred Flatow	Gold; Gold; Gold; Silver	Gymnastics	Men's team parallel bars Men's team horizontal bar Men's parallel bars Men's horizontal bar
Fritz Hofmann	Gold; Gold; Silver; Bronze	Gymnastics; Athletics	Men's team parallel bars Men's team horizontal bar 100 m Men's rope climbing
Conrad Böcker	Gold; Gold	Gymnastics	Men's team parallel bars Men's team horizontal bar
Gustav Flatow	Gold; Gold	Gymnastics	Men's team parallel bars Men's team horizontal bar
Georg Hillmar	Gold; Gold	Gymnastics	Men's team parallel bars Men's team horizontal bar
Fritz Manteuffel	Gold; Gold	Gymnastics	Men's team parallel bars Men's team horizontal bar
Karl Neukirch	Gold; Gold	Gymnastics	Men's team parallel bars Men's team horizontal bar
Richard Röstel	Gold; Gold	Gymnastics	Men's team parallel bars Men's team horizontal bar
Gustav Schuft	Gold; Gold	Gymnastics	Men's team parallel bars Men's team horizontal bar

== Competitors ==
The following is the list of number of competitors in the Games.

Sport	Men	Women	Total
Athletics	5	0	5
Cycling	3	0	3
Gymnastics	11	0	11
Tennis	1	0	1
Weightlifting	1	0	1
Wrestling	1	0	1
Total	19	0	19

Medals by day
Day	Date	1st place, gold medalist(s)	2nd place, silver medalist(s)	3rd place, bronze medalist(s)	Total
1	6 April	0	0	0	0
2	7 April	0	0	0	0
3	8 April	0	0	0	0
4	9 April	4	3	1	8
5	10 April	1	1	1	3
6	11 April	1	0	0	1
7	12 April	0	1	0	1
8	13 April	0	0	0	0
Total		6	5	2	13

== Athletics ==
Hofmann's silver medal in the 100 metres was the only medal earned by the German athletes, though they finished 4th or 5th an additional 4 times. Alfred Flatow was entered in the 100 metres but did not start.

Track & road events

Athlete	Event	Heat		Final	
Athlete	Event	Time	Rank	Time	Rank
Kurt Doerry	100 m	Unknown	4	Did not advance	
Alfred Flatow	100 m	DNS		Did not advance	
Fritz Hofmann	100 m	12.6	2 Q	12.2	2nd place, silver medalist(s)
Friedrich Traun	100 m	13.5	3	Did not advance	
Kurt Doerry	400 m	Unknown	3−4	Did not advance	
Fritz Hofmann	400 m	58.6	2 Q	56.7	4
Friedrich Traun	400 m	DNS		Did not advance	
Kurt Doerry	800 m	DNS		Did not advance	
Fritz Hofmann	800 m	DNS		Did not advance	
Friedrich Traun	800 m	2:13.4	3	Did not advance	
Carl Galle	1500 m	—N/a		4:39.0	4
Kurt Doerry	110 m hurdles	Unknown	3−4	Did not advance	
Fritz Hofmann	110 m hurdles	DNS		Did not advance	
Friedrich Traun	110 m hurdles	DNS		Did not advance	
Carl Galle	Marathon	—N/a		DNS	

Field events

Athlete	Event	Final	
Athlete	Event	Distance	Position
Conrad Böcker	High jump	DNS	
Kurt Doerry	High jump	DNS	
Alfred Flatow	High jump	DNS	
Gustav Flatow	High jump	DNS	
Carl Galle	High jump	DNS	
Fritz Hofmann	High jump	1.55	5
Fritz Manteuffel	High jump	DNS	
Gustav Schuft	High jump	DNS	
Carl Schuhmann	High jump	DNS	
Friedrich Traun	High jump	DNS	
Kurt Doerry	Pole vault	DNS	
Alfred Flatow	Pole vault	DNS	
Gustav Flatow	Pole vault	DNS	
Carl Galle	Pole vault	DNS	
Fritz Hofmann	Pole vault	DNS	
Fritz Manteuffel	Pole vault	DNS	
Karl Neukirch	Pole vault	DNS	
Carl Schuhmann	Pole vault	DNS	
Friedrich Traun	Pole vault	DNS	
Hermann Weingärtner	Pole vault	DNS	
Kurt Doerry	Long jump	DNS	
Alfred Flatow	Long jump	DNS	
Carl Galle	Long jump	DNS	
Fritz Hofmann	Long jump	DNS	
Friedrich Traun	Long jump	DNS	
Carl Schuhmann	Long jump	5.70	8
Hermann Weingärtner	Long jump	DNS	
Alfred Flatow	Triple jump	DNS	
Fritz Hofmann	Triple jump	Unknown	6−7
Carl Schuhmann	Triple jump	Unknown	5
Friedrich Traun	Triple jump	DNS	
Conrad Böcker	Shot put	DNS	
Alfred Flatow	Shot put	DNS	
Fritz Hofmann	Shot put	10.00	5−7
Carl Schuhmann	Shot put	Unknown	5−7
Hermann Weingärtner	Shot put	DNS	
Carl Schuhmann	Discus throw	DNS	

== Cycling ==
=== Track ===
Athlete	Event	Time / Distance	Rank
Theodor Leupold	Men's time trial	27.0	5
Joseph Rosemeyer	Men's time trial	27.2	8
Joseph Rosemeyer	Men's sprint	DNF	
Joseph Rosemeyer	10 km	Unknown	4
Bernard Knubel	100 km	DNF	
Theodor Leupold	100 km	DNF	
Joseph Rosemeyer	100 km	DNF	
Joseph Welzenbacher	100 km	DNF	
Joseph Welzenbacher	Men's 12 hour race	DNF	

=== Road ===
Athlete	Event	Time	Rank
August von Gödrich	Men's road race	3:42:18	2nd place, silver medalist(s)
Bernard Knubel	Men's road race	DNS	
Theodor Leupold	Men's road race	DNS	
Fritz Manteuffel	Men's road race	DNS	
Joseph Rosemeyer	Men's road race	DNS	
Joseph Welzenbacher	Men's road race	DNS	

== Gymnastics ==
Germany dominated the gymnastics program, taking 5 of the 8 gold medals and medalling in each event.

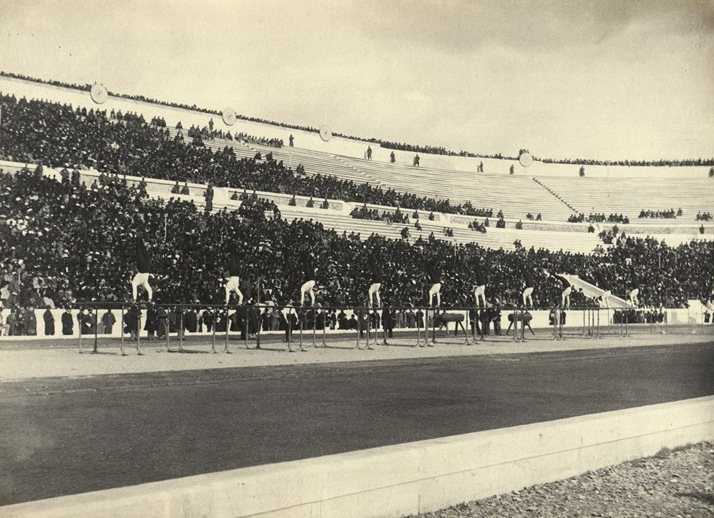
German team at parallel bars

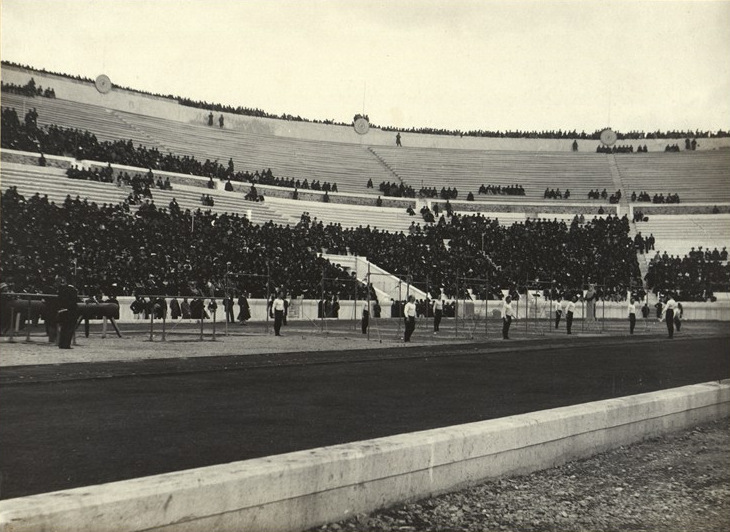
German team on horizontal bars

Team

Athlete	Event	Result	Rank
Conrad Böcker; Alfred Flatow; Gustav Flatow; Georg Hilmar; Fritz Hofmann; Fritz Manteuffel; Karl Neukirch; Richard Röstel; Gustav Schuft; Carl Schuhmann; Hermann Weingärtner	Men's team parallel bars	Unknown	1st place, gold medalist(s)
Conrad Böcker; Alfred Flatow; Gustav Flatow; Georg Hilmar; Fritz Hofmann; Fritz Manteuffel; Karl Neukirch; Richard Röstel; Gustav Schuft; Carl Schuhmann; Hermann Weingärtner	Men's team horizontal bar	Unknown	1st place, gold medalist(s)

Individual

Athlete	Event	Result	Rank
Conrad Böcker	Men's vault	Unknown	4−15
Alfred Flatow	Men's vault	Unknown	4−15
Gustav Flatow	Men's vault	Unknown	4−15
Georg Hilmar	Men's vault	Unknown	4−15
Fritz Manteuffel	Men's vault	Unknown	4−15
Karl Neukirch	Men's vault	Unknown	4−15
Richard Röstel	Men's vault	Unknown	4−15
Gustav Schuft	Men's vault	Unknown	4−15
Carl Schuhmann	Men's vault	Unknown	1st place, gold medalist(s)
Hermann Weingärtner	Men's vault	Unknown	3rd place, bronze medalist(s)
Conrad Böcker	Men's pommel horse	Unknown	3−15
Alfred Flatow	Men's pommel horse	Unknown	3−15
Gustav Flatow	Men's pommel horse	Unknown	3−15
Georg Hilmar	Men's pommel horse	Unknown	3−15
Fritz Manteuffel	Men's pommel horse	Unknown	3−15
Karl Neukirch	Men's pommel horse	Unknown	3−15
Richard Röstel	Men's pommel horse	Unknown	3−15
Gustav Schuft	Men's pommel horse	Unknown	3−15
Carl Schuhmann	Men's pommel horse	Unknown	3−15
Hermann Weingärtner	Men's pommel horse	Unknown	2nd place, silver medalist(s)
Conrad Böcker	Men's rings	Unknown	6−8
Alfred Flatow	Men's rings	Unknown	6−8
Gustav Flatow	Men's rings	Unknown	6−8
Carl Schuhmann	Men's rings	Unknown	5
Hermann Weingärtner	Men's rings	Unknown	2nd place, silver medalist(s)
Conrad Böcker	Men's horizontal bar	Unknown	3−15
Alfred Flatow	Men's horizontal bar	Unknown	2nd place, silver medalist(s)
Gustav Flatow	Men's horizontal bar	Unknown	3−15
Georg Hilmar	Men's horizontal bar	Unknown	3−15
Fritz Manteuffel	Men's horizontal bar	Unknown	3−15
Karl Neukirch	Men's horizontal bar	Unknown	3−15
Richard Röstel	Men's horizontal bar	Unknown	3−15
Gustav Schuft	Men's horizontal bar	Unknown	3−15
Carl Schuhmann	Men's horizontal bar	Unknown	3−15
Hermann Weingärtner	Men's horizontal bar	Unknown	1st place, gold medalist(s)
Conrad Böcker	Men's parallel bars	Unknown	3−18
Alfred Flatow	Men's parallel bars	Unknown	1st place, gold medalist(s)
Gustav Flatow	Men's parallel bars	Unknown	3−18
Georg Hilmar	Men's parallel bars	Unknown	3−18
Fritz Manteuffel	Men's parallel bars	Unknown	3−18
Karl Neukirch	Men's parallel bars	Unknown	3−18
Richard Röstel	Men's parallel bars	Unknown	3−18
Gustav Schuft	Men's parallel bars	Unknown	3−18
Carl Schuhmann	Men's parallel bars	Unknown	3−18
Hermann Weingärtner	Men's parallel bars	Unknown	3−18
Fritz Hofmann	Men's rope climbing	12.5	3rd place, bronze medalist(s)

== Tennis ==
Traun was defeated by Boland in the first round of the singles tournament. The two entered the doubles tournament as a pair, winning the gold medal in that competition as part of a mixed team; that medal is not counted for Germany.

Athlete	Event	First round	Quarterfinals	Semifinals	Final	
Athlete	Event	Opposition Score	Opposition Score	Opposition Score	Opposition Score	Rank
Friedrich Traun	Singles	Boland (GBR); L 0–6, 6–2, 2–6	Did not advance			=8
Friedrich Traun (GER); John Boland (GBR)	Doubles	—N/a	Akratopoulos / Akratopoulos (GRE) W	Bye	Kasdaglis / Petrokokkinos (GRE); W 5-7, 6-4, 6-1	1st place, gold medalist(s)

== Weightlifting ==
Schuhmann's lift was equal to that of the bronze medallist, but lifting form was used as a tie-breaker in the event.

Athlete	Event	Weight	Rank
Carl Schuhmann	Two hand lift	90.0	4

== Wrestling ==
Schuhmann first faced Launceston Elliot, the one-handed lift weightlifting champion, defeating him fairly easily. He received a bye in the semifinals, to face Georgios Tsitas in the final match. That contest took two days, after it had been postponed on account of darkness 40 minutes into the first day. Schuhmann quickly won on the second morning.

Athlete	Event	Quarterfinal	Semifinal	Final	
Athlete	Event	Opposition Result	Opposition Result	Opposition Result	Rank
Carl Schuhmann	Men's Greco-Roman	Elliot (GBR); W	Bye	Tsitas (GRE); W	1st place, gold medalist(s)
