= Gymnastics at the 1896 Summer Olympics – Men's pommel horse =

Gymnastics at the Olympics

Men's pommel horse at the Games of the I Olympiad
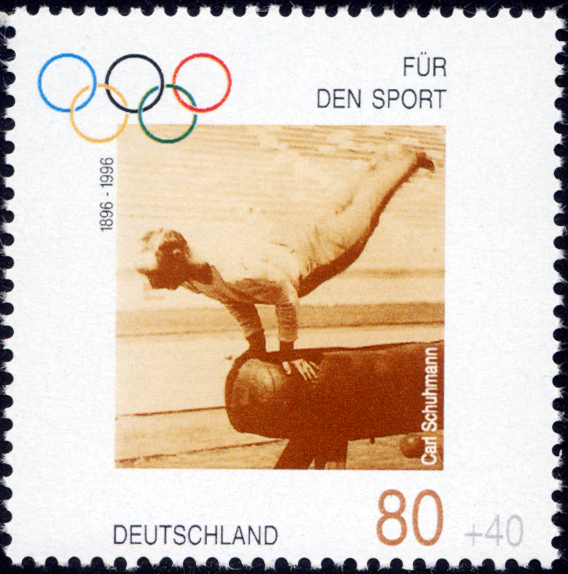
- German stamp commemorating 1896 Olympic gymnastics (depicting Carl Schuhmann in the vault competition)
- Venue: Panathinaiko Stadium
- Date: April 9, 1896
- Competitors: 15 from 5 nations

Medalists
| 1st place, gold medalist(s) | | Louis Zutter; Switzerland |
| 2nd place, silver medalist(s) | | Hermann Weingärtner; Germany |

The men's pommel horse was one of eight gymnastics events on the Gymnastics at the 1896 Summer Olympics programme. The pommel horse was the fourth event held on 9 April. 15 athletes from five nations started the pommel horse exercise. Zutter won Switzerland's first gold medal in this event, with Weingärtner taking the silver.

== Background ==
This was the first appearance of the event, which is one of the five apparatus events held every time there were apparatus events at the Summer Olympics (no apparatus events were held in 1900, 1908, 1912, or 1920). The field consisted of 10 Germans plus five men from four other nations.

== Competition format ==
Judges awarded the prizes, but little is known of the scoring and rankings.

== Schedule ==
The men's pommel horse was held in the afternoon of the fourth day of events, following the 800 metres, team parallel bars, team horizontal bar, and men's vault.

| Date | | Time | Round |
| Gregorian | Julian | Time | Round |
|---|---|---|---|
| Thursday, 9 April 1896 | Thursday, 28 March 1896 | Afternoon | Final |

== Results ==
| Rank | Gymnast | Nation |
|---|---|---|
| 1st place, gold medalist(s) | Louis Zutter | Switzerland |
| 2nd place, silver medalist(s) | Hermann Weingärtner | Germany |
| 3–15 | Konrad Böcker | Germany |
| 3–15 | Charles Champaud | Bulgaria |
| 3–15 | Alfred Flatow | Germany |
| 3–15 | Gustav Flatow | Germany |
| 3–15 | Georg Hilmar | Germany |
| 3–15 | Gyula Kakas | Hungary |
| 3–15 | Fritz Manteuffel | Germany |
| 3–15 | Karl Neukirch | Germany |
| 3–15 | Aristovoulos Petmezas | Greece |
| 3–15 | Richard Röstel | Germany |
| 3–15 | Gustav Schuft | Germany |
| 3–15 | Carl Schuhmann | Germany |
| 3–15 | Desiderius Wein | Hungary |

== Sources ==
- Lampros, S.P.; Polites, N.G.; De Coubertin, Pierre; Philemon, P.J.; Anninos, C. (1897). The Olympic Games: BC 776 – AD 1896. Athens: Charles Beck. (Digitally available at )
- Mallon, Bill; Widlund, Ture (1998). The 1896 Olympic Games. Results for All Competitors in All Events, with Commentary. Jefferson: McFarland. ISBN 0-7864-0379-9. (Excerpt available at )
- Smith, Michael Llewellyn (2004). Olympics in Athens 1896. The Invention of the Modern Olympic Games. London: Profile Books. ISBN 1-86197-342-X.
