= Gymnastics at the 1896 Summer Olympics – Men's vault =

Gymnastics at the Olympics

Men's vault at the Games of the I Olympiad
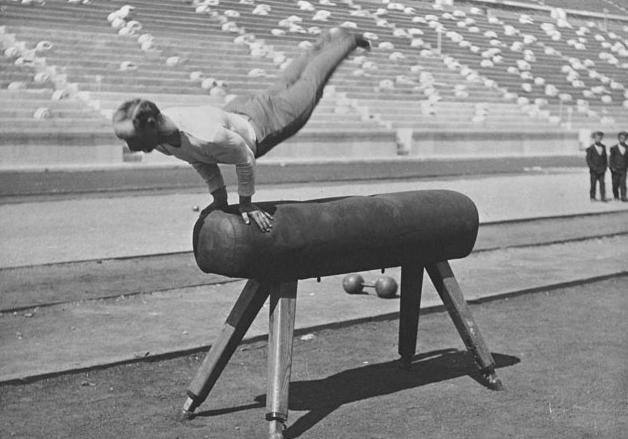
- Carl Schuhmann on the vault
- Venue: Panathinaiko Stadium
- Date: April 9, 1896
- Competitors: 15 from 5 nations

Medalists
1st place, gold medalist(s)		Carl Schuhmann; Germany
2nd place, silver medalist(s)		Louis Zutter; Switzerland
3rd place, bronze medalist(s)		Hermann Weingärtner; Germany

The men's vault was one of the eight gymnastics events on the Gymnastics at the 1896 Summer Olympics programme. The third event, it was held on 9 April. 15 athletes from five nations competed. The Germans captured the gold and bronze medals, while Zutter won the silver for Switzerland.

== Background ==
This was the first appearance of the event, which is one of the five apparatus events held every time there were apparatus events at the Summer Olympics (no apparatus events were held in 1900, 1908, 1912, or 1920). The field consisted of 10 Germans plus five men from four other nations. The men's vault was one of only four events in 1896 that had no Greek competitors.

== Competition format ==
The event used a "vaulting horse" aligned parallel to the gymnast's run (rather than the modern "vaulting table" in use since 2004). Each gymnast had two minutes and could perform as many vaults as he wished during that time. Judges awarded the prizes, but little is known of the scoring and rankings.

== Schedule ==
The men's vault was held in the afternoon of the fourth day of events, following the 800 metres, team parallel bars, and team horizontal bar.

Date		Time	Round
Gregorian	Julian	Time	Round
Thursday, 9 April 1896	Thursday, 28 March 1896	Afternoon	Final

== Results ==
Rank	Gymnast	Nation
1st place, gold medalist(s)	Carl Schuhmann	Germany
2nd place, silver medalist(s)	Louis Zutter	Switzerland
3rd place, bronze medalist(s)	Hermann Weingärtner	Germany
4–15	Konrad Böcker	Germany
4–15	Charles Champaud	Bulgaria
4–15	Alfred Flatow	Germany
4–15	Gustav Flatow	Germany
4–15	Georg Hilmar	Germany
4–15	Gyula Kakas	Hungary
4–15	Fritz Manteuffel	Germany
4–15	Karl Neukirch	Germany
4–15	Richard Röstel	Germany
4–15	Gustav Schuft	Germany
4–15	Henrik Sjöberg	Sweden
4–15	Desiderius Wein	Hungary

== Sources ==
- Lampros, S.P.; Polites, N.G.; De Coubertin, Pierre; Philemon, P.J.; Anninos, C. (1897). The Olympic Games: BC 776 – AD 1896. Athens: Charles Beck. (Digitally available at )
- Mallon, Bill; Widlund, Ture (1998). The 1896 Olympic Games. Results for All Competitors in All Events, with Commentary. Jefferson: McFarland. ISBN 0-7864-0379-9. (Excerpt available at )
- Smith, Michael Llewellyn (2004). Olympics in Athens 1896. The Invention of the Modern Olympic Games. London: Profile Books. ISBN 1-86197-342-X.
