= Gymnastics at the 1896 Summer Olympics =

Gymnastics at the Games of the I Olympiad
- Gymnastics pictogram
- Venue: Panathinaiko Stadium
- Dates: 9–11 April 1896
- No. of events: 8 (8 men, 0 women)
- Competitors: 71 from 9 nations

At the 1896 Summer Olympics, eight gymnastics events, all for men, were contested in Panathinaiko Stadium. They were organized and prepared by the Sub-Committee for Wrestling and Gymnastics. Events took place on April 9, April 10, and April 11, 1896. There were 71 competitors from 9 nations (including 52 from Greece) that took part in gymnastics.

== Medal summary ==
These medals are retroactively assigned by the International Olympic Committee; at the time, winners were given a silver medal and subsequent places received no award.

Games	Gold	Silver	Bronze
Team parallel bars	Germany; Konrad Böcker; Alfred Flatow; Gustav Flatow; Georg Hilmar; Fritz Hofmann; Fritz Manteuffel; Karl Neukirch; Richard Röstel; Gustav Schuft; Carl Schuhmann; Hermann Weingärtner	Greece; Nikolaos Andriakopoulos; Spyros Athanasopoulos; Petros Persakis; Thomas Xenakis	Greece; Ioannis Chrysafis; Ioannis Mitropoulos; Dimitrios Loundras; Filippos Karvelas
Team horizontal bar	Germany; Konrad Böcker; Alfred Flatow; Gustav Flatow; Georg Hilmar; Fritz Hofmann; Fritz Manteuffel; Karl Neukirch; Richard Röstel; Gustav Schuft; Carl Schuhmann; Hermann Weingärtner	only one team competed	
Vault	Carl Schuhmann; Germany	Louis Zutter; Switzerland	Hermann Weingärtner; Germany
Pommel horse	Louis Zutter; Switzerland	Hermann Weingärtner; Germany	not known
Rings	Ioannis Mitropoulos; Greece	Hermann Weingärtner; Germany	Petros Persakis; Greece
Horizontal bar	Hermann Weingärtner; Germany	Alfred Flatow; Germany	not known
Parallel bars	Alfred Flatow; Germany	Louis Zutter; Switzerland	not known
Rope climbing	Nikolaos Andriakopoulos; Greece	Thomas Xenakis; Greece	Fritz Hofmann; Germany

== Participating nations ==
A total of 71 gymnasts from 9 nations competed at the Athens Games:

- Bulgaria (1)
- Denmark (1)
- France (1)
- Germany (11)
- Great Britain (1)
- Greece (52)
- Hungary (2)
- Sweden (1)
- Switzerland (1)

== Medal table ==
Rank	Nation	Gold	Silver	Bronze	Total
1	Germany	5	3	2	10
2	Greece	2	2	2	6
3	Switzerland	1	2	0	3
Totals (3 entries)		8	7	4	19

== Sub-Committee for Wrestling and Gymnastics ==
- Joan. Phokianos, president
- George Streit, secretary
- Joan. Yenissarlis
- Loukas Belos
- Nic. Politis
- Chas. Waldstein
- Dimitri Aighinitis
- Dim. Sekkeris
- Spiridon Comoundouros
- Const. Manos
- Sp. Antonopoulos

== See also ==
- List of Olympic medalists in gymnastics (men)
