= Horizontal bar at the Olympics =

Horizontal bar at the Olympic Games
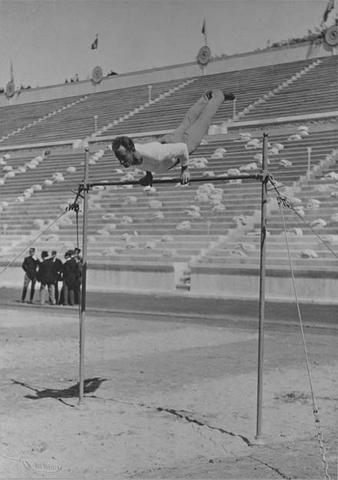
- Horizontal bar competition at the 1896 Summer Olympics

Overview
- Sport: Artistic gymnastics
- Gender: Men
- Years held: Men: 1896, 1904, 1924–2024

Reigning champion
- Men: Shinnosuke Oka (JPN)

The horizontal bar is an artistic gymnastics event held at the Summer Olympics. The event was first held for men at the first modern Olympics in 1896. It was held again in 1904, but not in 1900, 1908, 1912, or 1920 when no apparatus events were awarded medals. The horizontal bar was one of the components of the men's artistic individual all-around in 1900, 1908, and 1912, however. The men's horizontal bar returned as a medal event in 1924 and has been held every Games since. Horizontal bar scores were included in the individual all-around for 1924 and 1928, with no separate apparatus final. In 1932, the horizontal bar was entirely separate from the all-around. From 1936 to 1956, there were again no separate apparatus finals with the horizontal bar scores used in the all-around. Beginning in 1960, there were separate apparatus finals.

The 1896 Games also featured a team horizontal bar event.

At the 2024 Games, the final event saw all but two fall from the horizontal bar, sparking calls for an investigation.

== Medalists ==
=== Men ===
Games	Gold	Silver	Bronze
1896 Athens	Hermann Weingärtner; Germany	Alfred Flatow; Germany	Not awarded
1900 Paris	Not held		
1904 St. Louis	Anton Heida; United States Edward Hennig; United States	Not awarded	George Eyser; United States
1908 London	Not held		
1912 Stockholm	Not held		
1920 Antwerp	Not held		
1924 Paris	Leon Štukelj; Yugoslavia	Jean Gutweninger; Switzerland	André Higelin; France
1928 Amsterdam	Georges Miez; Switzerland	Romeo Neri; Italy	Eugen Mack; Switzerland
1932 Los Angeles	Dallas Bixler; United States	Heikki Savolainen; Finland	Einari Teräsvirta; Finland
1936 Berlin	Aleksanteri Saarvala; Finland	Konrad Frey; Germany	Alfred Schwarzmann; Germany
1948 London	Josef Stalder; Switzerland	Walter Lehmann; Switzerland	Veikko Huhtanen; Finland
1952 Helsinki	Jack Günthard; Switzerland	Alfred Schwarzmann; Germany Josef Stalder; Switzerland	Not awarded
1956 Melbourne	Takashi Ono; Japan	Yuri Titov; Soviet Union	Masao Takemoto; Japan
1960 Rome	Takashi Ono; Japan	Masao Takemoto; Japan	Boris Shakhlin; Soviet Union
1964 Tokyo	Boris Shakhlin; Soviet Union	Yuri Titov; Soviet Union	Miroslav Cerar; Yugoslavia
1968 Mexico City	Akinori Nakayama; Japan Mikhail Voronin; Soviet Union	Not awarded	Eizo Kenmotsu; Japan
1972 Munich	Mitsuo Tsukahara; Japan	Sawao Kato; Japan	Shigeru Kasamatsu; Japan
1976 Montreal	Mitsuo Tsukahara; Japan	Eizo Kenmotsu; Japan	Eberhard Gienger; West Germany Henri Boerio; France
1980 Moscow	Stoyan Deltchev; Bulgaria	Alexander Dityatin; Soviet Union	Nikolai Andrianov; Soviet Union
1984 Los Angeles	Shinji Morisue; Japan	Tong Fei; China	Koji Gushiken; Japan
1988 Seoul	Vladimir Artemov; Soviet Union Valeri Liukin; Soviet Union	Not awarded	Holger Behrendt; East Germany Marius Gherman; Romania
1992 Barcelona	Trent Dimas; United States	Andreas Wecker; Germany	Grigory Misutin; Unified Team
1996 Atlanta	Andreas Wecker; Germany	Krasimir Dunev; Bulgaria	Vitaly Scherbo; Belarus Fan Bin; China Alexei Nemov; Russia
2000 Sydney	Alexei Nemov; Russia	Benjamin Varonian; France	Lee Joo-Hyung; South Korea
2004 Athens	Igor Cassina; Italy	Paul Hamm; United States	Isao Yoneda; Japan
2008 Beijing	Zou Kai; China	Jonathan Horton; United States	Fabian Hambüchen; Germany
2012 London	Epke Zonderland; Netherlands	Fabian Hambüchen; Germany	Zou Kai; China
2016 Rio de Janeiro	Fabian Hambüchen; Germany	Danell Leyva; United States	Nile Wilson; Great Britain
2020 Tokyo	Daiki Hashimoto; Japan	Tin Srbić; Croatia	Nikita Nagornyy; ROC
2024 Paris	Shinnosuke Oka; Japan	Ángel Barajas; Colombia	Tang Chia-hung; Chinese Taipei Zhang Boheng; China

==== Multiple medalists ====
Rank	Gymnast	Nation	Olympics	Gold	Silver	Bronze	Total
1	Takashi Ono	Japan	1956–1960	2	0	0	2
1	Mitsuo Tsukahara	Japan	1972–1976	2	0	0	2
3	Fabian Hambüchen	Germany	2008–2016	1	1	1	3
4	Josef Stalder	Switzerland	1948–1952	1	1	0	2
4	Andreas Wecker	Germany	1992–1996	1	1	0	2
6	Boris Shakhlin	Soviet Union	1960–1964	1	0	1	2
6	Alexei Nemov	Russia	1996–2000	1	0	1	2
6	Zou Kai	China	2008–2012	1	0	1	2
9	Yuri Titov	Soviet Union	1956–1964	0	2	0	2
10	Eizo Kenmotsu	Japan	1968–1976	0	1	1	2
10	Alfred Schwarzmann	Germany	1936–1952	0	1	1	2
10	Masao Takemoto	Japan	1956–1960	0	1	1	2

==== Medalists by country ====
Rank	Nation	Gold	Silver	Bronze	Total
1	Japan	8	3	5	16
2	Soviet Union	4	3	2	9
3	United States	4	3	1	8
4	Germany	3	5	2	10
5	Switzerland	3	3	1	7
6	China	1	1	3	5
6	Finland	1	1	2	4
8	Bulgaria	1	1	0	2
8	Italy	1	1	0	2
10	Russia	1	0	1	2
10	Yugoslavia	1	0	1	2
12	Netherlands	1	0	0	1
13	France	0	1	2	3
14	Colombia	0	1	0	1
14	Croatia	0	1	0	1
16	Belarus	0	0	1	1
16	Chinese Taipei	0	0	1	1
16	East Germany	0	0	1	1
16	West Germany	0	0	1	1
16	Great Britain	0	0	1	1
16	Romania	0	0	1	1
16	ROC	0	0	1	1
16	South Korea	0	0	1	1
16	Unified Team	0	0	1	1

== Gallery ==
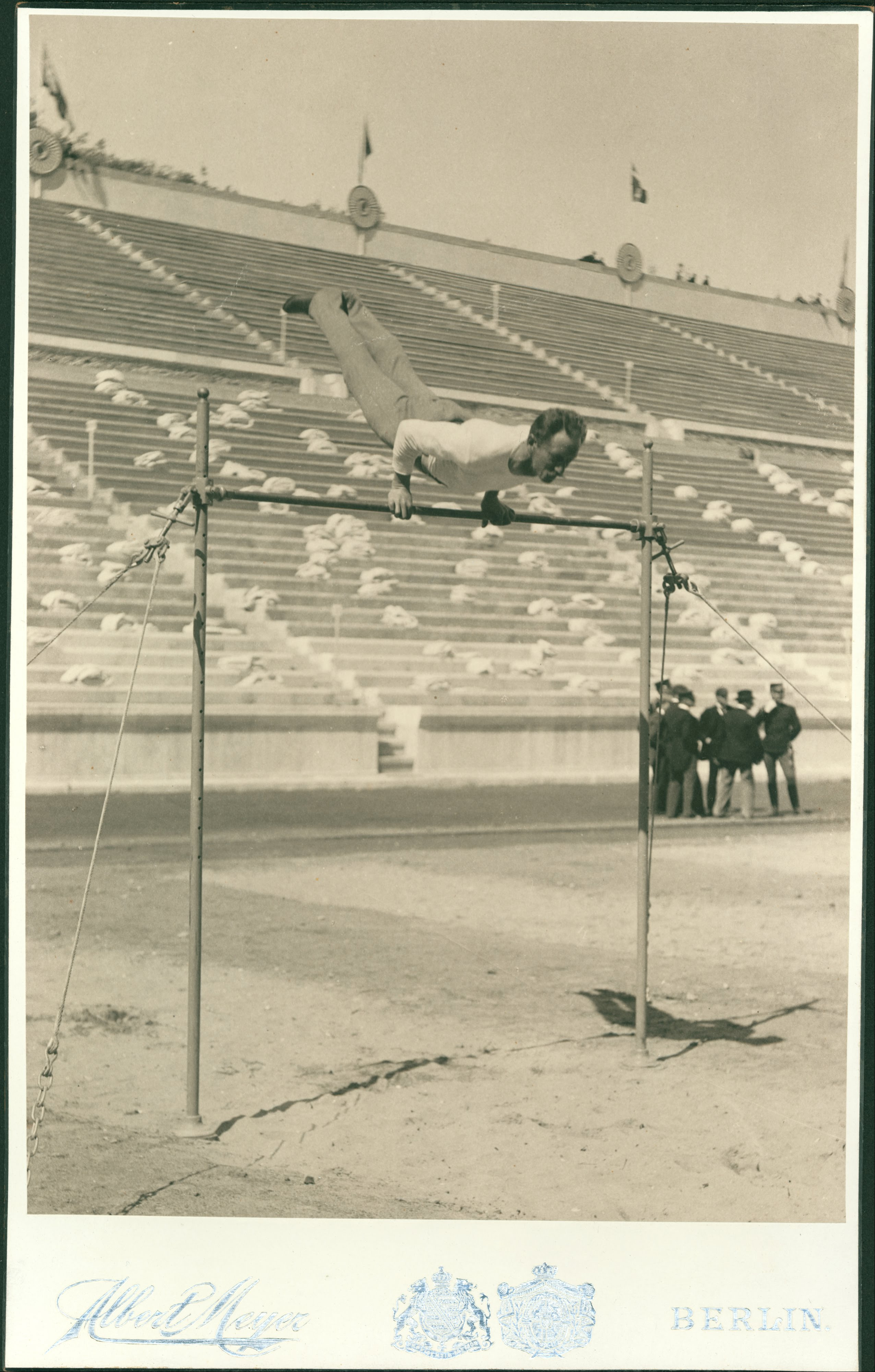
Hermann Weingärtner, 1896

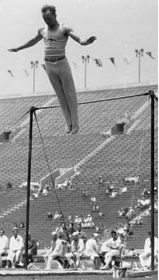
Heikki Savolainen, 1932

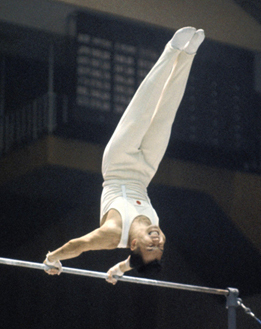
Takashi Ono, 1964

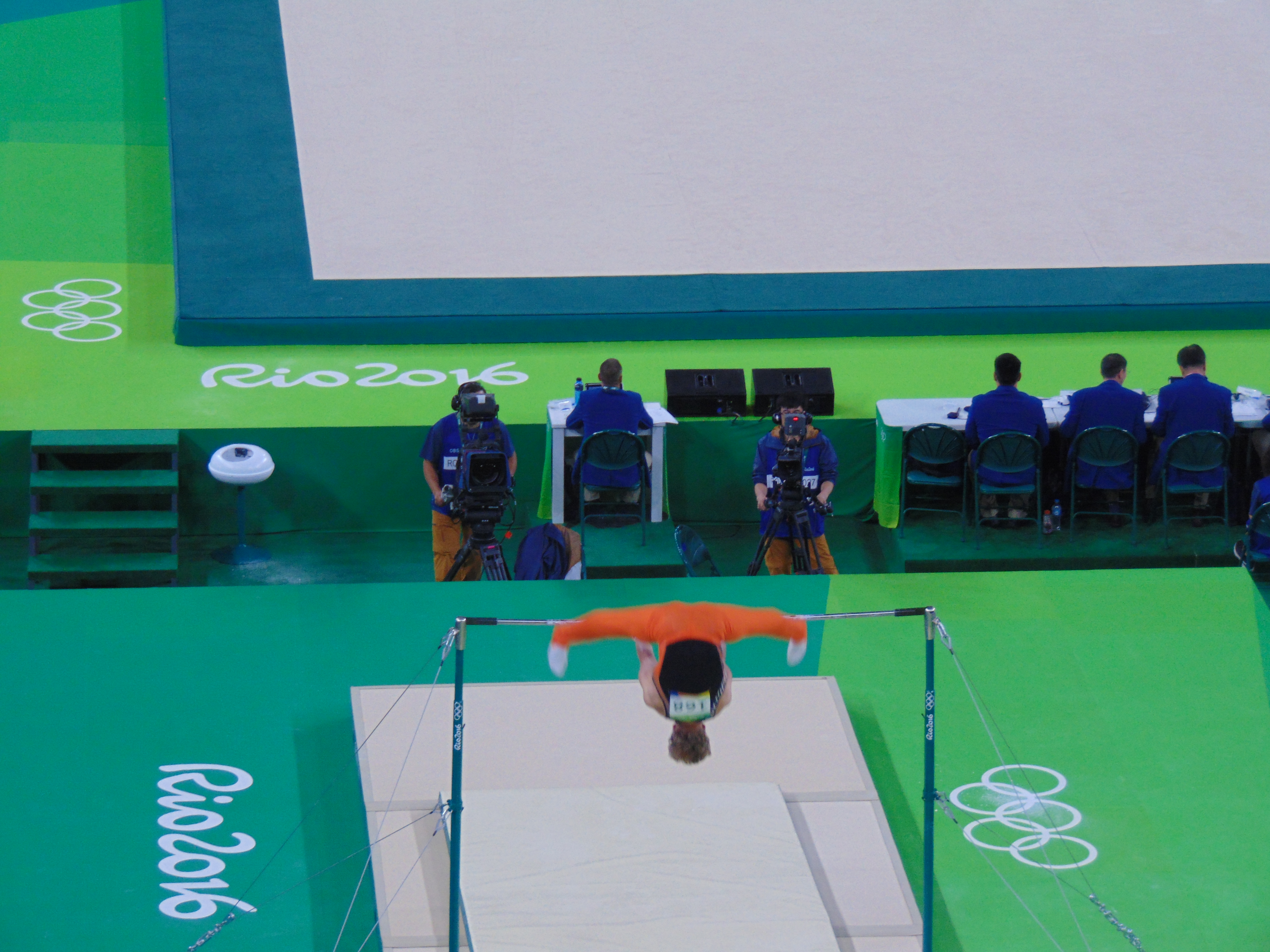
Epke Zonderland, 2016

Men's Horizontal Bar at the Olympics

== Team horizontal bar ==
At the 1896 Olympics a team version of the horizontal bar was held. It was one of two team apparatus events in 1896, along with the team parallel bars. The team apparatus events were never held again.

The team horizontal bar event had 10 horizontal bars for the team to use. Teams in the 1896 team events could be large, with one in the parallel bars exceeding 30 members. Only one team competed in the team horizontal bar. Judges scored the teams on execution, rhythm, and technical difficulty.

Games	Gold	Silver	Bronze
1896 Athens	Germany	Not awarded	Not awarded
