= Gymnastics at the 1896 Summer Olympics – Men's team horizontal bar =

Men's team horizontal bar at the Games of the I Olympiad
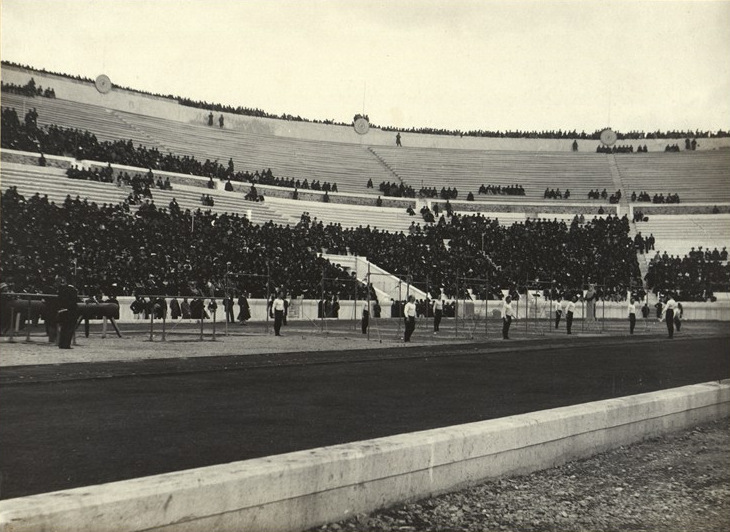
- German team on horizontal bars
- Venue: Panathinaiko Stadium
- Date: 9 April 1896
- Competitors: 10 from 1 nation

Medalists
1st place, gold medalist(s)		Konrad Böcker; Alfred Flatow; Gustav Flatow; Georg Hilmar; Fritz Hofmann; Fritz Manteuffel; Karl Neukirch; Richard Röstel; Gustav Schuft; Carl Schuhmann; Hermann Weingärtner	Germany

The men's team horizontal bar was the second of eight gymnastics events on the Gymnastics at the 1896 Summer Olympics programme. It was conducted on 9 April. Only one team, from Germany, competed.

== Background ==
This was the only appearance of the event, which was one of two team apparatus events contested at the 1896 Games (along with a team parallel bars competition).

== Competition format ==
There were 10 horizontal bars made available to the teams. However, there was apparently no limit on the size of the teams, as one team in the parallel bars competition had 33 members. The German team in the horizontal bar had 10 competing members. Judges scored the routines on execution, rhythm, and technical difficulty.

== Schedule ==
The men's team parallel bars was held in the afternoon of the fourth day of events. It was the third event of the afternoon, following the 800 metres (which began at 2:30 p.m.) and team parallel bars.

Date		Time	Round
Gregorian	Julian	Time	Round
Thursday, 9 April 1896	Thursday, 28 March 1896	2:30	Final

== Results ==
Rank	Nation	Team leader	Gymnasts
1st place, gold medalist(s)	Germany	Fritz Hofmann	Konrad Böcker, Alfred Flatow, Gustav Flatow, Georg Hilmar, Fritz Manteuffel, Karl Neukirch, Richard Röstel, Gustav Schuft, Carl Schuhmann, Hermann Weingärtner

== Sources ==
- Lampros, S.P.; Polites, N.G.; De Coubertin, Pierre; Philemon, P.J.; Anninos, C. (1897). The Olympic Games: BC 776 – AD 1896. Athens: Charles Beck. (Digitally available at )
- Mallon, Bill; Widlund, Ture (1998). The 1896 Olympic Games. Results for All Competitors in All Events, with Commentary. Jefferson: McFarland. ISBN 0-7864-0379-9. (Excerpt available at )
- Smith, Michael Llewellyn (2004). Olympics in Athens 1896. The Invention of the Modern Olympic Games. London: Profile Books. ISBN 1-86197-342-X.
