= Gymnastics at the 1896 Summer Olympics – Men's team parallel bars =

Olympic gymnastics event

Men's team parallel bars at the Games of the I Olympiad
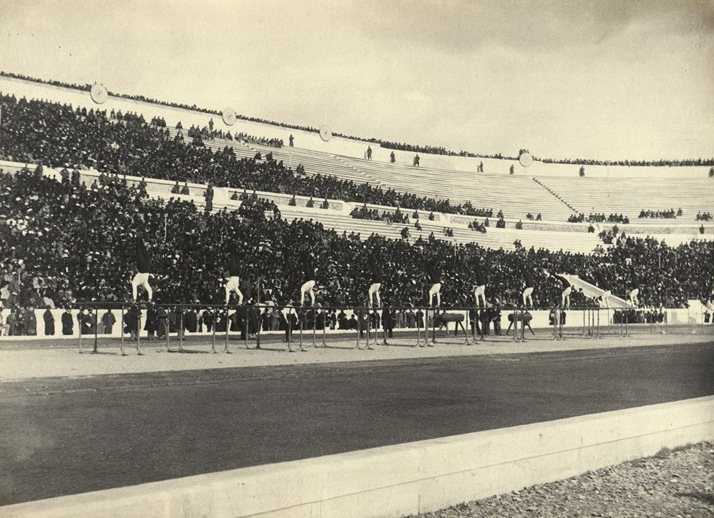
- German team at parallel bars
- Venue: Panathinaiko Stadium
- Date: 9 April 1896
- Competitors: 63 from 2 nations

Medalists
| 1st place, gold medalist(s) | | Germany; Germany |
| 2nd place, silver medalist(s) | | Panellinios Gymnastikos Syllogos; Greece |
| 3rd place, bronze medalist(s) | | Ethnikos Gymnastikos Syllogos; Greece |

The men's team parallel bars was the first of eight gymnastics events on the Gymnastics at the 1896 Summer Olympics programme. It was held on 9 April. Three teams took part, one German and two Greek, with the German team winning the competition.

== Background ==
This was the only appearance of the event, which was one of two team apparatus events contested at the 1896 Games (along with a team horizontal bar competition).

== Competition format ==
There were 10 sets of parallel bars made available to the teams. However, there was apparently no limit on the size of the teams, as the Panellinios team had 33 members (though the names of only four are known).

Judges scored the routines on execution, rhythm, and technical difficulty.

== Schedule ==
The men's team parallel bars was held in the afternoon of the fourth day of events. It was the second event of the afternoon, following the 800 metres (which began at 2:30 p.m.).

| Date | | Time | Round |
| Gregorian | Julian | Time | Round |
|---|---|---|---|
| Thursday, 9 April 1896 | Thursday, 28 March 1896 | 2:30 | Final |

== Results ==
| Rank | Nation | Team | Team leader | Gymnasts |
|---|---|---|---|---|
| 1st place, gold medalist(s) | Germany | Germany | Fritz Hofmann | Konrad Böcker, Alfred Flatow, Gustav Flatow, Georg Hilmar, Fritz Manteuffel, Karl Neukirch, Richard Röstel, Gustav Schuft, Carl Schuhmann, Hermann Weingärtner |
| 2nd place, silver medalist(s) | Greece | Panellinios | Spyridon Athanasopoulos | Nikolaos Andriakopoulos, Petros Persakis, Thomas Xenakis, 29 others, names unknown |
| 3rd place, bronze medalist(s) | Greece | Ethnikos | Ioannis Chrysafis | Ioannis Mitropoulos, Dimitrios Loundras, Filippos Karvelas, 15 others, names unknown |

== Sources ==
- Lampros, S.P.; Polites, N.G.; De Coubertin, Pierre; Philemon, P.J.; Anninos, C. (1897). The Olympic Games: BC 776 – AD 1896. Athens: Charles Beck. (Digitally available at )
- Mallon, Bill; Widlund, Ture (1998). The 1896 Olympic Games. Results for All Competitors in All Events, with Commentary. Jefferson: McFarland. ISBN 0-7864-0379-9. (Excerpt available at )
- Smith, Michael Llewellyn (2004). Olympics in Athens 1896. The Invention of the Modern Olympic Games. London: Profile Books. ISBN 1-86197-342-X.
