= Hillmar =

Hillmar may refer to:

- Hillmar, California, former name of Hilmar, California
- Georg Hilmar, German gymnast sometimes listed as Georg Hillmar
