= Knubel =

Knubel is a German surname that may refer to

- Bernard Knubel (1872–1957), German cyclist
- Bernhard Knubel (1938–1973), German rower
- Frederick Hermann Knubel (1870–1945), American Lutheran clergyman
- Josef Knubel (1881–1961), Swiss mountaineer
