= Karvelas (surname) =

Karvelas (Greek: Καρβέλας) is a surname. Notable people with the surname include:

- Aristides Karvelas (born 1994), South African cricketer
- Filippos Karvelas (1877 or 1879 – 1952), Greek gymnast
- Nikos Karvelas (born 1951), Greek songwriter, producer and singer
- Patricia Karvelas, Australian radio presenter, current affairs journalist and political correspondent
- Robert Karvelas (1921–1991), American actor
