= Leonidas Tsiklitiras =

Greek gymnast

- Λεωνίδας Τσικλητήρας

Gymnastics career
- Discipline: Men's artistic gymnastics
- Country represented: Greece
- Gym: Panakhaikos Gymnastikos Syllogos

Leonidas Tsiklitiras (Greek: Λεωνίδας Τσικλητήρας) was a Greek gymnast. He competed at the 1896 Summer Olympics in Athens. Tsiklitiras competed in the horizontal bar event. He did not win a medal, though his exact placement is unknown.
