= Christos Zoumis =

Greek athlete

Christos Zoumis (Greek: Χρήστος Ζούμης, born 1875 in Chalcis, Greece; date of death unknown) was a Greek athlete. He competed at the 1896 Summer Olympics in Athens. He was born in Chalcis. Zoumis placed either sixth or seventh in the triple jump, with Fritz Hofmann having the other place. There were seven athletes in the event.
