= Switzerland at the 1896 Summer Olympics =

- IOC code: SUI
- NOC: Swiss Olympic Association

in Athens, Greece April 6, 1896 – April 15, 1896
- Competitors: 2 in 2 sports and 5 events
- Medals: Gold 1 Silver 2 Bronze 0 Total 3

Summer Olympics appearances (overview)
- 1896; 1900; ~~1904~~; 1908; 1912; 1920; 1924; 1928; 1932; 1936; 1948; 1952; 1956; 1960; 1964; 1968; 1972; 1976; 1980; 1984; 1988; 1992; 1996; 2000; 2004; 2008; 2012; 2016; 2020; 2024; 2028

Other related appearances
- 1906 Intercalated Games

Three competitors from Switzerland competed in two sports at the 1896 Summer Olympics. The Swiss won one championship and placed second in two more events, for a total of three medals. They had 8 entries in 5 events.

== Medalists ==
Medal	Name	Sport	Event	Date
Gold	Louis Zutter	Gymnastics	Men's pommel horse	April 9
Silver	Louis Zutter	Gymnastics	Men's vault	April 9
Silver	Louis Zutter	Gymnastics	Men's parallel bars	April 10

== Competitors ==
The following is the list of number of competitors in the Games.

Sport	Men	Women	Total
Gymnastics	1	0	1
Shooting	1	0	1
Total	2	0	2

== Gymnastics ==
All of Switzerland's medals were won by Zutter in the gymnastics competitions. Zutter's only event that did not result in a medal was in the horizontal bar. Champaud (see Bulgaria at the 1896 Summer Olympics) entered three events, but did not medal in any.

Athlete	Event	Result	Rank
Louis Zutter	Men's vault	Unknown	2nd place, silver medalist(s)
Louis Zutter	Men's parallel bars	Unknown	2nd place, silver medalist(s)
Louis Zutter	Men's pommel horse	Unknown	1st place, gold medalist(s)
Louis Zutter	Men's horizontal bar	Unknown	3-15

== Shooting ==
Baumann took 8th of 42 in the military rifle competition.

Athlete	Event	Hits	Score	Rank
Albert Baumann	200 m military rifle	Unknown	1294	8
