= Joseph Welzenbacher =

German cyclist

Personal information
- Born: Munich, German Empire

Cycling career
- Sport: Cycling
- Discipline: Track
- Role: Rider

Amateur team
- VC Bavaria, Munich

Joseph Welzenbacher was a German cyclist. He competed at the 1896 Summer Olympics in Athens. Welzenbacher entered the 100 kilometres and the 12 hours races. He did not finish either.
