= Günter Nachtigall =

German artistic gymnast

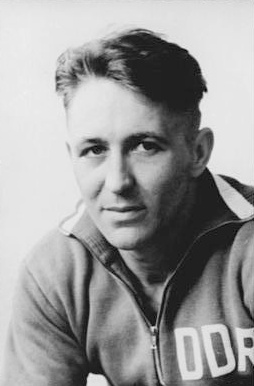
- Nachtigall in July 1960

Personal information
- Born: 5 March 1930 (age 96) Blankenburg (Harz), Weimar Republic
- Height: 1.67 m (5 ft 6 in)

Gymnastics career
- Discipline: Men's artistic gymnastics
- Country represented: East Germany
- Club: Armeesportklub Vorwärts Berlin

Günter Nachtigall (born 5 March 1930) is a retired German gymnast. He competed at the 1960 Summer Olympics in all artistic gymnastics events and finished in seventh place with the German team. Individually, his best achievement was 33rd place on the vault. During his career he won seven national titles, on the pommel horse (1956), floor (1956, 1957), parallel bars (1956), rings (1956), vault (1957) and allround (1956).
