= Antonios Papaioannou =

Greek gymnast

- Αντώνηος Παπαϊωάννου

Gymnastics career
- Discipline: Men's artistic gymnastics
- Country represented: Greece
- Club: Gymnastiki Etaireia Patron

Antonios Papaioannou (Greek: Αντώνηος Παπαϊωάννου) was a Greek gymnast. He competed at the 1896 Summer Olympics in Athens. Papaigannou competed in the parallel bars and horizontal bar individual events. He did not win medals in either competition, though his exact ranking is unknown.
