= Carl Galle =

German athlete (1872–1963)

Carl Galle (born 5 October 1872 in Berlin, German Empire; died 18 April 1963 in Pankow, East Berlin, East Germany) was a German middle distance runner. He competed at the 1896 Summer Olympics in Athens. Galle competed in the 1500 metres. The race was run in a single heat. Galle finished fourth, behind Edwin Flack (Australia), Arthur Blake (United States), and Albin Lermusiaux (France).

Galle was also an association football player for BFV Germania 88 from 1894 to 1899. He was originally slated to compete as a footballer in the 1896 Summer Olympics, but the planned football tournament never occurred, prompting him to switch to athletics. He later played cricket and tennis.
