= Theodor Leupold =

German cyclist

Personal information
- Full name: Theodor Leupold
- Born: Zittau, Germany

Cycling career
- Sport: Cycling
- Discipline: Track
- Role: Rider

Theodor Ferdinand Leupold was a German racing cyclist from Zittau. He competed at the 1896 Summer Olympics in Athens.

Leupold competed in the 333 metres and 100 kilometres races. He tied with two other cyclists for fifth place in the 333 metres at 27.0 seconds and was among the seven cyclists that did not finish the longer one (out of nine that started).
