= Matthias Volz =

German gymnast (1910–2004)

- Full name: Matthias Max Volz
- Born: 4 May 1910 Schwabach, German Empire
- Died: 26 August 2004 (aged 94) Spalt, Germany

Gymnastics career
- Discipline: Men's artistic gymnastics
- Country represented: Germany
- Gym: Turnverein 1848 Schwabach
Medal record
Men's artistic gymnastics
Representing Germany
Olympic Games
Gold medal – first place	1936 Berlin	Team
Bronze medal – third place	1936 Berlin	Rings
Bronze medal – third place	1936 Berlin	Vault

Matthias Max Volz (4 May 1910 in Schwabach – 26 August 2004 in Spalt) was a German gymnast who competed in the 1936 Summer Olympics.
