= Dimitrios Loundras =

Greek gymnast (1885–1970)

- Δημήτριος Λούνδρας
- Born: 6 September 1885; Athens, Kingdom of Greece
- Died: 15 February 1970 (aged 84)

Gymnastics career
- Discipline: Men's artistic gymnastics
- Country represented: Greece
- Club: Ethnikos Gymnastikos Syllogos
Medal record
Men's artistic gymnastics
Representing Greece
Olympic Games
| Bronze medal – third place | 1896 Athens | Team parallel bars |
- Military career
- Allegiance: Kingdom of Greece
- Branch: Royal Hellenic Navy
- Service years: 1905–1935
- Rank: Rear admiral
- Conflicts: World War I

Dimitrios Loundras (Greek: Δημήτριος Λούνδρας; 6 September 1885 (Note: Greece officially adopted the Gregorian calendar on 16 February 1923 (which became 1 March). All dates prior to that, unless specifically denoted, are Old Style.) – 15 February 1970) was a Greek gymnast and naval officer who competed at the 1896 Summer Olympics in Athens.

Loundras competed in the team parallel bars event. In that competition, Loundras was a member of the Ethnikos Gymnastikos Syllogos team that placed third of the three teams in the event. At 10 years 218 days, he remains the youngest medalist and competitor in Olympic history, if one discounts an unknown competitor of disputed age who competed as coxswain for the Dutch coxed pair rowing team in the 1900 Olympics.

Loundras later became an officer in the Royal Hellenic Navy, graduating from the Hellenic Navy Academy as an ensign in 1905. He served in various commands as well as a naval attaché, and fought in World War I, before retiring with the rank of rear admiral in 1935. On the outbreak of the Greco-Italian War in 1940, he was recalled to active service and appointed head of the Aegean Naval Command. He finally retired in 1945 as a vice admiral.

From 1924 on, he was a member of the Hellenic Olympic Committee. After World War II, he played a leading role in the establishment of the Hellenic Shooting Federation and became its first president. In 1936, he also served briefly as prefect of Lesbos Prefecture.
