= Alfred Schwarzmann =

German gymnast (1912–2000)

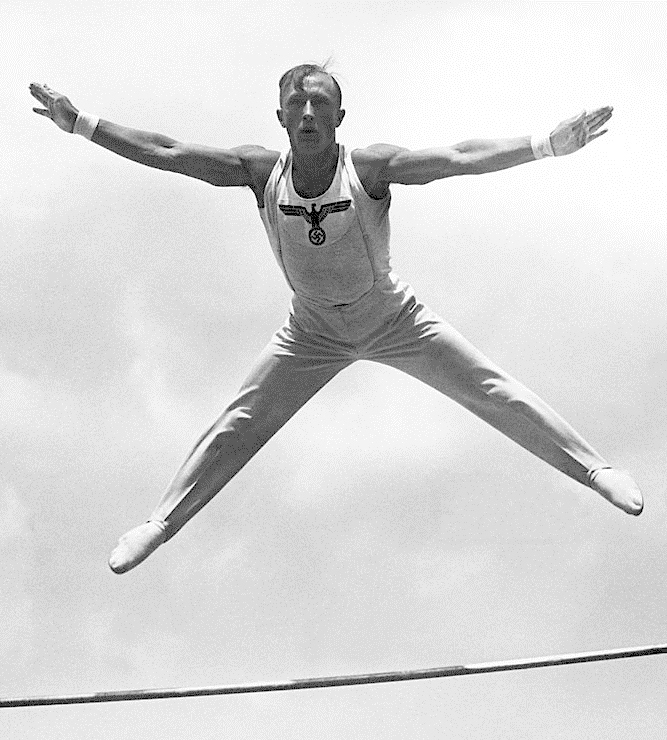
- Schwarzmann at the 1936 Olympics

Personal information
- Born: 22 March 1912 Fürth, German Empire
- Died: 11 March 2000 (aged 87) Goslar, Germany

Gymnastics career
- Discipline: Men's artistic gymnastics
- Country represented: Germany
- Club: Heeressportschule Wünsdorf, Zossen; TV 1860 Fürth, Fürth
Medal record
Olympic Games
Representing Germany
Gold medal – first place	1936 Berlin	Individual all-around
Gold medal – first place	1936 Berlin	Team all-around
Gold medal – first place	1936 Berlin	Vault
Bronze medal – third place	1936 Berlin	Horizontal bar
Bronze medal – third place	1936 Berlin	Parallel bars
Representing Germany
Silver medal – second place	1952 Helsinki	Horizontal bar

Karl-Alfred Schwarzmann (22 March 1912 – 11 March 2000) was a German Olympic gymnast. He won three gold and two bronze medals at the 1936 Berlin Olympics and another silver medal at the 1952 Summer Olympics. During World War II, Schwarzmann served in the Wehrmacht and was a recipient of the Knight's Cross of the Iron Cross of Nazi Germany.

== Career ==
Alfred Schwarzmann joined the 13th Company of the Nuremberg Infantry Regiment on 1 April 1935 after signing up for a twelve-year period of service. He was promoted to Unteroffizier on 1 May 1935 and was a member of the Gymnastics team preparing for the 1936 Berlin Olympics, where he won three gold and two bronze medals.

On 10 May 1940, Schwarzmann and his company parachuted into the Netherlands and took a key bridge at Moerdijk. In the first hour of the fighting, Schwarzmann was badly wounded when a bullet pierced a lung. He was treated for his wounds in Dordrecht after the Dutch capitulation.

Aged 40, Schwarzmann competed at the 1952 Summer Olympics in all artistic gymnastics events and won a silver medal on the horizontal bar. In 2008 he was inducted into the Germany's Sports Hall of Fame.

== Awards ==
- Iron Cross 2nd Class & 1st Class (25 May 1940)
- Wound Badge (1939) in Black (29 May 1940)
- Knight's Cross of the Iron Cross on 29 May 1940 as Oberleutnant and platoon leader in the 8./Fallschirmjäger-Regiment 1
- Wehrmacht Long Service Award 4th Class
- Heer (army) Parachutist Badge
