= Ioannis Chrysafis =

Greek gymnast (1873–1932)

- Born: 1873
- Died: 12 October 1932 (aged 58–59)

Gymnastics career
- Discipline: Men's artistic gymnastics
- Country represented: Greece
- Club: Ethnikos Gymnastikos Syllogos
Medal record
Men's artistic gymnastics
Representing Greece
Olympic Games
Bronze medal – third place	1896 Athens	Team parallel bars

Ioannis Chrysafis (1873 – October 12, 1932) was a Greek gymnast. He competed at the 1896 Summer Olympics in Athens.

Chrysafis was the team leader of the Ethnikos Gymnastikos Syllogos team that placed third of the three teams in the event, giving the members of the team bronze medals.
