= Bernard Knubel =

German cyclist

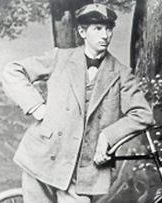
Bernard Knubel

Bernard Wilhelm Knubel (13 November 1872 – 16 April 1957) was a German cyclist who competed at the 1896 Summer Olympics in Athens.

Knubel was born in Münster. In 1896 he was one of nine cyclists to enter the 100 kilometres race. Seven of them, including Knubel, did not finish.

Knubel and his brothers John and Anton were cycling enthusiasts. Anton Knubel had started manufacturing and distributing bicycles in 1885 but died in a plane crash in 1915. Bernard Knubel took over the business, and motorbikes and then cars were included in the trade. The company is still in family ownership and is simply known as Knubel, with some 400 employees across 11 locations. Knubel died on 16 April 1957 in Münster.
