= Spyridon Athanasopoulos =

Greek gymnast

Gymnastics career
- Discipline: Men's artistic gymnastics
- Country represented: Greece
- Club: Panellinios Gymnastikos Syllogos
Medal record
Men's artistic gymnastics
Representing Greece
Olympic Games
| Silver medal – second place | 1896 Athens | Team parallel bars |

Spyridon Athanasopoulos (Greek: Σπυρίδων Αθανασόπουλος) was a Greek gymnast. He competed at the 1896 Summer Olympics in Athens.

Athanasopoulos was the team leader of the Panellinios Gymnastikos Syllogos team that placed second of the three teams in the event, giving him a silver medal.
