= Louis Zutter =

Swiss gymnast

- Full name: Jules Alexis Zutter
- Born: 12 December 1865 Les Ponts-de-Martel, Switzerland
- Died: 10 November 1946 (aged 80) Boudry, Switzerland

Gymnastics career
- Discipline: Men's artistic gymnastics
- Country represented: Switzerland
Medal record
Representing Switzerland
Summer Olympics
Gold medal – first place	1896 Athens	Pommel horse
Silver medal – second place	1896 Athens	Vault
Silver medal – second place	1896 Athens	Parallel bars

Jules Alexis "Louis" Zutter (2 December 1865 – 10 November 1946) was a Swiss gymnast. He competed at the 1896 Summer Olympics in Athens.

Zutter won one of the events, the pommel horse. He was also the runner-up in two more events, the vault and the parallel bars. In addition, he competed in the horizontal bar event, but without success.

He was born in Les Ponts-de-Martel and lived in Peseux, where he was a member of the gymnastics club La Société des Amis gymnastes de Neuchâtel. In 1893, his father was hired as a trainer in Panachaikos Gymnastikos Syllogos, and Louis became a member of the club. After his success in the 1896 Olympics, he was honoured in Patras with the Greek athletes by the city. The Zutter family left Greece due to the Greco-Turkish War (1897).
