= Desiderius Wein =

Hungarian doctor and gymnast

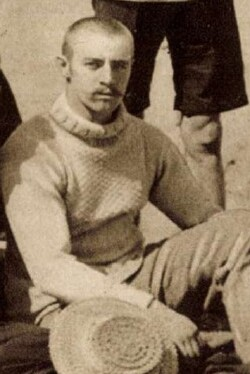
- Desiderius Wein at the 1896 Summer Olympics

Personal information
- Full name: Dezső Antal Wein
- Alternative name: Dezső Boros
- Born: January 19, 1873 Budapest, Kingdom of Hungary
- Died: June 5, 1944 (aged 71) Budapest, Kingdom of Hungary

Gymnastics career
- Discipline: Men's artistic gymnastics
- Country represented: Hungary

Dezső Wein or Desiderius Wein (also known as Dezső Boros; January 19, 1873 – June 5, 1944) was a Hungarian medical doctor and gymnast, who competed at the 1896 Summer Olympics in Athens. Wein competed in the parallel bars, horizontal bar, vault, and rings individual events. He did not win medals in any of those competitions, though his exact ranking in each is unknown.

== Sources ==
- Mallon, Bill; Widlund, Ture (1998). The 1896 Olympic Games. Results for All Competitors in All Events, with Commentary. Jefferson: McFarland. ISBN 0-7864-0379-9. (Excerpt available at )
