= Filippos Karvelas =

Greek gymnast (1877–1952)

- Φίλιππος Καρβελάς
- Born: 1877 Athens, Greece
- Died: 7 November 1952 (aged 74–75) Athens, Greece

Gymnastics career
- Discipline: Men's artistic gymnastics
- Country represented: Greece
- Club: Ethnikos Gymnastikos Syllogos
Medal record
Men's artistic gymnastics
Representing Greece
Olympic Games
Bronze medal – third place	1896 Athens	Team parallel bars

Filippos Karvelas (Greek: Φίλιππος Καρβελάς; 1877 in Athens – 7 November 1952 in Athens) was a Greek gymnast. He competed at the 1896 Summer Olympics in Athens.

Karvelas competed in both the individual and team events of the parallel bars. He did not win a medal in the individual event, though his ranking is unknown. In the team event, Karvelas was a member of the Ethnikos Gymnastikos Syllogos team that placed third of the three teams in the event, giving him a bronze medal.
