= Hermann Weingärtner =

German gymnast (1864–1919)

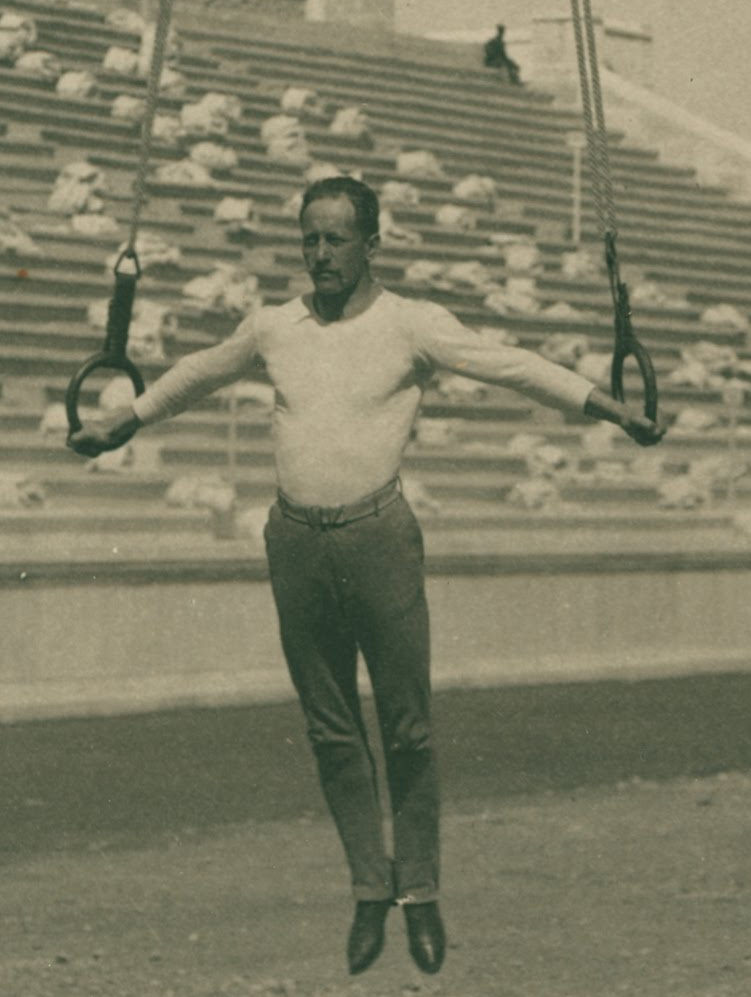
- Weingärtner in 1896
- Full name: Otto Ludwig Hermann Weingärtner
- Born: 27 August 1864 Frankfurt (Oder), Brandenburg, Kingdom of Prussia
- Died: 22 December 1919 (aged 55) Frankfurt (Oder), Weimar Republic

Gymnastics career
- Discipline: Men's artistic gymnastics
- Country represented: Germany
Medal record
Men's artistic gymnastics
Olympic Games
Gold medal – first place	1896 Athens	Team parallel bars
Gold medal – first place	1896 Athens	Team horizontal bar
Gold medal – first place	1896 Athens	Horizontal bar
Silver medal – second place	1896 Athens	Pommel horse
Silver medal – second place	1896 Athens	Rings
Bronze medal – third place	1896 Athens	Vault

Otto Ludwig Hermann Weingärtner (27 August 1864 – 22 December 1919) was a German gymnast.

He started his career in his hometown Frankfurt (Oder) at the local gymnastics club Frankfurter Turnverein 1860. Later on, he moved to Berlin to compete for the Deutsche Turnerschaft.

He competed at the 1896 Summer Olympics in Athens. Weingärtner was a member of the German team that won two gold medals by placing first in both of the team events, the parallel bars and the horizontal bar.

He also won a number of individual medals, taking the gold in the horizontal bar, silver in pommel horse and rings, and bronze in the vault. He competed in the parallel bars, but did not win a medal in that event. His six medals arguably made him the most successful competitor at the first modern Olympic Games.

After his return to Germany, he and most of the other German gymnasts were suspended because the Deutsche Turnerschaft (at this time the governing body of German gymnastics) boycotted the Olympic Games for the reason that competing is "un-German". So he moved back to Frankfurt (Oder) to manage the open-air swimming pool founded by his father on the Ziegenwerder island.

He drowned trying to rescue a person from drowning in the Oder River.

In 1996, the main footpath on the Ziegenwerder island was named Hermann-Weingärtner-Weg.

== See also ==
- List of multiple Olympic medalists at a single Games
