= Fritz Hofmann (athlete) =

German athlete and gymnast

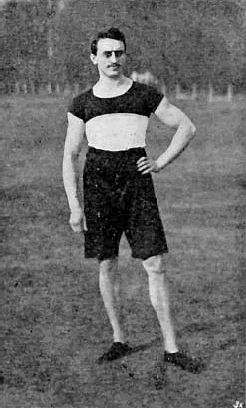
- Hofmann in 1896

Personal information
- Full name: Friedrich Carl August Hofmann
- Born: 19 June 1871 Berlin, German Empire
- Died: 14 July 1927 (aged 56) Berlin, Weimar Republic
- Height: 167 cm (5 ft 6 in)
- Weight: 56 kg (123 lb)

Sport

Gymnastics career
- Discipline: Men's artistic gymnastics
- Country represented: Germany
Medal record
Representing Germany
Athletics
Olympic Games
Silver medal – second place	1896 Athens	100 metres
Men's artistic gymnastics
Olympic Games
Bronze medal – third place	1896 Athens	Rope climbing

Friedrich Carl August "Fritz" Hofmann (born 19 June 1871 in Berlin, German Empire; died 14 July 1927 in Berlin, Weimar Republic) was a German athlete. He competed at the 1896 Summer Olympics in Athens.

== 1896 Summer Olympics ==
Hofmann competed in the 100 metres. In the heats, he came in second out of five runners, qualifying for the final. There he again came in second, with his time of 12.2 seconds being 0.2 seconds behind the winner, Thomas Burke of the United States.

Hofmann also competed in the 400 metres. He placed second in his preliminary heat, advancing to the final. There, he finished in fourth place. He was credited as having finishing third for many years, but modern sources (based on 1896 documents) place him fourth behind Charles Gmelin.

In the high jump, Hofmann placed last of the five athletes. His best jump was 1.55 metres. He also placed either sixth or seventh (with Khristos Zoumis of Greece taking the other place) in the triple jump, as well as in the bottom three of the seven-man field in the shot put.

He also competed in three gymnastics events, rope climbing and the team parallel bars and horizontal bar. In the rope climbing, Hofmann reached the highest of the three gymnasts who did not finish, receiving a bronze medal behind the two Greek climbers, who reached the top of the 14-metre rope. Hofmann made it to 12.5 metres. In the team, Hofmann was the captain of the German team that won both competitions.

== Later life ==
Hofmann, along with the rest of the 1896 German Olympic gymnastics team, was excluded from the German Gymnastics Association and banned from German national gymnastics competitions for competing in an international sporting event. He remained involved in athletics, however, captaining the German team at the 1900 Summer Olympics and 1904 Summer Olympics, as well as the 1906 Intercalated Games (at which he also competed again in the 100 metres, finishing 5th in his first-round heat). From 1904 to 1927, he served on the German National Olympic Committee "Deutscher Reichsausschuss für Olympische Spiele" ("German Imperial Commission for Olympic Games"), which was renamed Deutscher Reichsausschuss für Leibesübungen ("German Imperial Commission for Physical Exercise") in 1917.

Hofmann owned a sports articles business, opened a "sports-bath", and edited a health magazine.
