= Carl Schuhmann =

German athlete (1869–1946)

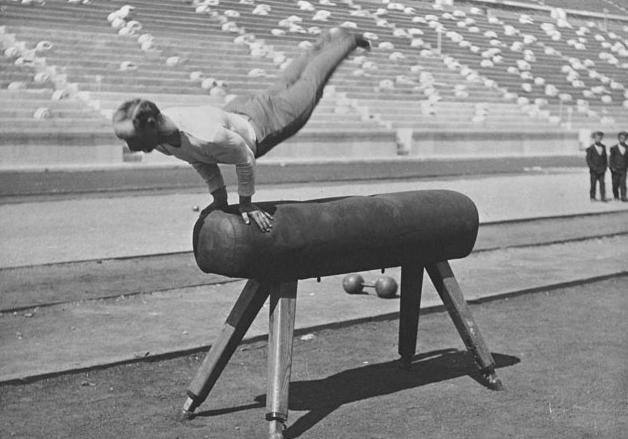
- Schuhmann at the 1896 Summer Olympics

Personal information
- Born: 12 May 1869 Münster, Westphalia, Kingdom of Prussia, North German Confederation
- Died: 24 March 1946 (aged 76) Berlin, Allied-occupied Germany

Gymnastics career
- Discipline: Men's artistic gymnastics
- Country represented: Germany
Medal record
Representing Germany
Olympic Games
Men's artistic gymnastics
Gold medal – first place	1896 Athens	Team parallel bars
Gold medal – first place	1896 Athens	Team horizontal bar
Gold medal – first place	1896 Athens	Vault
Men's wrestling
Gold medal – first place	1896 Athens	Greco-Roman

Carl August Berthold Schuhmann (12 May 1869 – 24 March 1946) was a German athlete who won four Olympic titles in gymnastics and wrestling at the 1896 Summer Olympics in Athens, becoming the most successful athlete at the inaugural Olympics of the modern era. He also competed in weightlifting.

== Biography ==
Schuhmann, who was a member of the Berliner Turnerschaft, was a member of the successful German gymnastics team that won the team events in the horizontal bar and parallel bars events. Schuhmann added a third title by winning the horse vault event. He also competed in the parallel bars, horizontal bar, pommel horse, and rings events without success. The only extant information about his placing in those events, besides not being a medallist, is that he placed fifth in the rings competition.

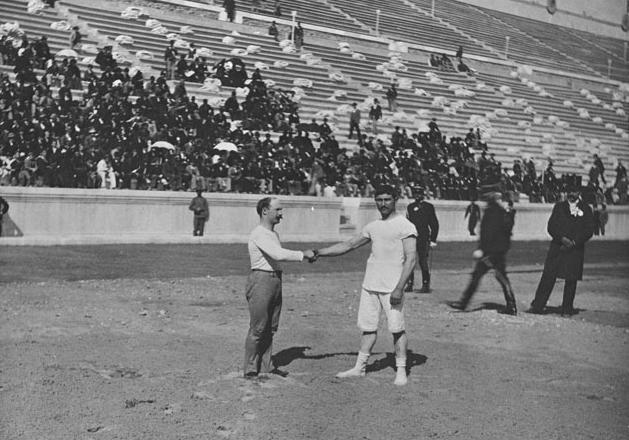
Schuhmann (left) before the Olympic wrestling final, which he won

Schuhmann then entered the wrestling competition, which he also won, even though he was much lighter and smaller than most of the other combatants. In the first round, he faced Launceston Elliot of Great Britain and Ireland, who had won the weightlifting competition. Schuhmann won easily. The semifinals resulted in a bye for the German. In the final, he faced Georgios Tsitas of Greece. The match went for 40 minutes before it was determined that it was too dark to continue and the bout was postponed until a second day. The next morning, Schuhmann quickly finished the bout with a win for a gold medal.

He also entered the weightlifting competition, placing fourth.

Schuhmann was one of nine athletes to compete in the long jump. The only information known about his placing in the event is that he was not one of the top four. He also placed fifth in the triple jump and in the bottom three of a seven-man field in the shot put.

Schuhmann tied for fourth place in the two-handed weightlifting competition now known as the clean and jerk. He and Georgios Papasideris of Greece both lifted 90.0 kilograms.

In 1936, he was part of a gymnastics exhibition at the Olympic Stadium.

His tombstone at Friedhof Heerstraße is inscribed with the five Olympic Rings, the epitaph "Germany’s first Olympic champion", and the legend "Athens 1896".

== See also ==
- List of multi-sport athletes
- List of multi-sport champions
- List of multiple Olympic gold medalists at a single Games
