= Gustav Flatow =

German gymnast (1875–1945)

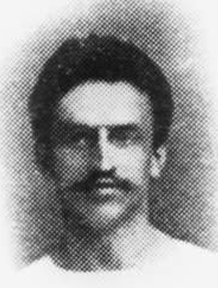
- Flatow, date unknown

Personal information
- Full name: Gustav Felix Flatow
- Born: 7 January 1875 Berent, West Prussia, German Empire
- Died: 29 January 1945 (aged 70) Theresienstadt, Protectorate of Bohemia and Moravia
- Relatives: Alfred Flatow (cousin)

Gymnastics career
- Discipline: Men's artistic gymnastics
- Country represented: Germany
Medal record
Men's artistic gymnastics
Representing Germany
Olympic Games
Gold medal – first place	1896 Athens	Team parallel bars
Gold medal – first place	1896 Athens	Team horizontal bar

Gustav Felix Flatow (7 January 1875 – 29 January 1945) was a German gymnast. He competed at the 1896 Summer Olympics in Athens and at the 1900 Summer Olympics in Paris. Flatow was Jewish, and was born in Berent, West Prussia. In 1892, he moved to Berlin.

== Biography ==
Flatow competed in the parallel bars, horizontal bar, vault, pommel horse, and rings individual events. He won no individual medals, unlike his cousin and teammate Alfred Flatow. However, both were members of the German team that competed in the two team events, for parallel bars and the horizontal bar. As Germany won both those events (the horizontal bar unchallenged), Gustav earned two gold medals. He also competed at the 1900 Summer Olympics in Paris, but without winning medals. He retired from gymnastics to manage his textile company, which he founded in 1899.

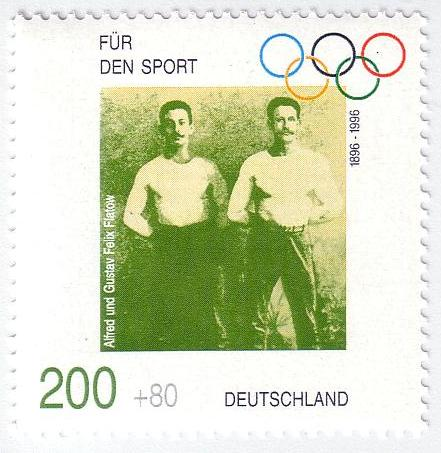
Gustav and Alfred Flatow on a German stamp

After the Nazi takeover in Germany in 1933, he fled to the Netherlands to find refuge, but he was taken into custody ten years later. On New Year's Eve 1943, he was jailed for fleeing, and in February 1944 was deported to Theresienstadt Ghetto, located in the fortress town of Terezín, in the Protectorate of Bohemia and Moravia (Nazi-occupied Czechoslovakia). This was the same camp to which his cousin, who was in the Olympics, had previously been sent. His cousin had already died there in 1942. Less than one year after his arrival, Gustav starved to death. He was 70 years old when he died on 29 January 1945, months before the Soviet army liberated the camp.

In 1986, journalists discovered his urn, which is now entombed in Terezín near the site of the concentration camp.

In 1989, he was inducted into the International Jewish Sports Hall of Fame.

In 1997, Berlin honoured Alfred and Gustav Flatow by renaming the Reichssportfeldstraße (a lane) near the Olympic Stadium to Flatowallee (Flatow-avenue). There is also the Flatow-Sporthalle (sports hall) at Berlin-Kreuzberg with a commemorative plaque for both. The Deutsche Post issued a set of four stamps to celebrate the 100th anniversary of the modern Olympic Games. One of the stamps honors the Flatows.

== See also ==
- List of select Jewish gymnasts
