= Karl Neukirch =

German gymnast

- Full name: Karl Bruno Paul Neukirch
- Born: 3 November 1864 Berlin, Kingdom of Prussia
- Died: 27 June 1941 (aged 76) Berlin, Nazi Germany

Gymnastics career
- Discipline: Men's artistic gymnastics
- Country represented: Germany
Medal record
Men's artistic gymnastics
Representing Germany
Olympic Games
Gold medal – first place	1896 Athens	Team parallel bars
Gold medal – first place	1896 Athens	Team horizontal bar

Karl Bruno Paul Neukirch (3 November 1864 – 27 June 1941) was a German gymnast. He was born and died in Berlin. He competed at the 1896 Summer Olympics in Athens.

Neukirch was a member of the German team that won two gold medals by placing first in both of the team events, the parallel bars and the horizontal bar. He also competed in the parallel bars, horizontal bar, vault, and pommel horse individual events, though without success.
