= Gustav Schuft =

German gymnast

- Full name: Fritz Richard Gustav Schuft
- Born: 16 June 1876 Berlin, German Empire
- Died: 8 February 1948 (aged 71) Cottbus, Allied-occupied Germany

Gymnastics career
- Discipline: Men's artistic gymnastics
- Country represented: Germany
- Gym: Turngemeinde in Berlin 1848
Medal record
Men's artistic gymnastics
Representing Germany
Olympic Games
Gold medal – first place	1896 Athens	Team parallel bars
Gold medal – first place	1896 Athens	Team horizontal bar

Fritz Richard Gustav Schuft (16 June 1876 in Berlin – 8 February 1948 in Cottbus) was a German gymnast. He competed at the 1896 Summer Olympics in Athens.

Schuft was a member of the German team that won two gold medals by placing first in both of the team events, the parallel bars and the horizontal bar. He also competed in the parallel bars, horizontal bar, vault, and pommel horse individual events, though without success.
