= Conrad Böcker =

German gymnast (1870–1936)

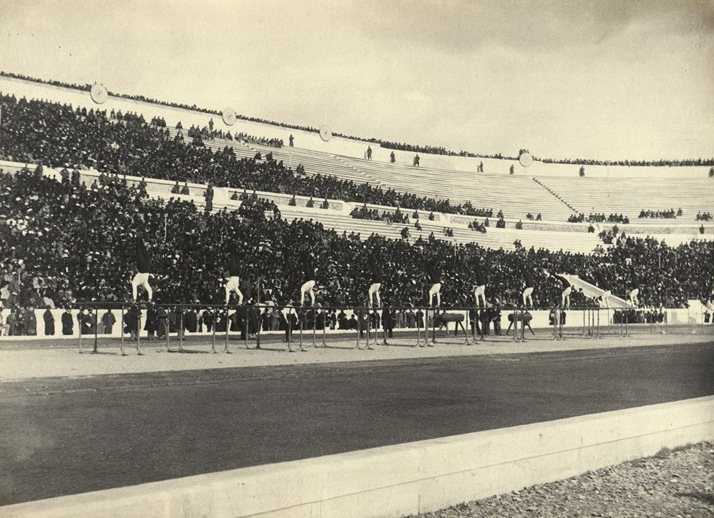
- Full name: Conrad Helmut Fritz Böcker
- Born: 24 August 1870 Leipzig, Kingdom of Saxony
- Died: 8 April 1936 (aged 65) Frankfurt am Main, Nazi Germany

Gymnastics career
- Discipline: Men's artistic gymnastics
- Country represented: Germany
- Gym: Turngemeinde in Berlin 1848
Medal record
Men's artistic gymnastics
Representing Germany
Olympic Games
Gold medal – first place	1896 Athens	Team parallel bars
Gold medal – first place	1896 Athens	Team horizontal bar

Conrad Helmut Fritz Böcker (24 August 1870 in Leipzig – 8 April 1936 in Frankfurt) was a German gymnast. He competed at the 1896 Summer Olympics in Athens. Böcker had little success in individual events. He competed in the parallel bars, horizontal bar, vault, pommel horse, and rings events. In none of them was he among the medallists. He did, however, win two gold medals as part of the German team in the two team events, on parallel bars and the horizontal bar.
