= Richard Röstel =

German gymnast

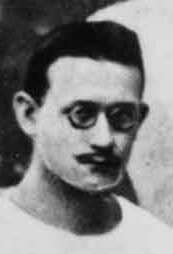
- Röstel in 1896
- Born: 1872

Gymnastics career
- Discipline: Men's artistic gymnastics
- Country represented: Germany
- Gym: Turngemeinde in Berlin 1848
Medal record
Men's artistic gymnastics
Representing Germany
Olympic Games
Gold medal – first place	1896 Athens	Team parallel bars
Gold medal – first place	1896 Athens	Team horizontal bar

Richard Röstel (born 1872 – after 1936) was a German gymnast. He competed at the 1896 Summer Olympics in Athens.

Röstel was a member of the German team that won two gold medals by placing first in both of the team events, the parallel bars and the horizontal bar. He also competed in the parallel bars, horizontal bar, vault, and pommel horse individual events, though without success.
