= Fritz Manteuffel =

German gymnast

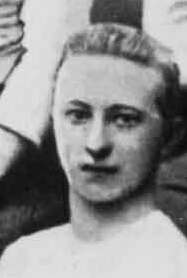
- Manteuffel in 1896
- Full name: Julius Carl Fritz Manteuffel
- Born: 11 January 1875 Berlin, German Empire
- Died: 21 April 1941 (aged 66) Berlin, Nazi Germany

Gymnastics career
- Discipline: Men's artistic gymnastics
- Country represented: Germany
- Gym: Berliner Turnrat
Medal record
Men's artistic gymnastics
Representing Germany
Olympic Games
Gold medal – first place	1896 Athens	Team parallel bars
Gold medal – first place	1896 Athens	Team horizontal bar

Julius Carl Fritz Manteuffel (11 January 1875 – 21 April 1941) was a German gymnast. He competed at the 1896 Summer Olympics in Athens.

Manteuffel was a member of the German team that won two gold medals by placing first in both of the team events, the parallel bars and the horizontal bar. He also competed in the parallel bars, horizontal bar, vault, and pommel horse individual events, though without success.
