= Georg Hillmar =

German gymnast

- Full name: Georg Otto Hillmar
- Born: 10 October 1876 Berlin, German Empire
- Died: 12 December 1911 (aged 35) Lichtenberg, Berlin, German Empire

Gymnastics career
- Discipline: Men's artistic gymnastics
- Country represented: Germany
- Gym: Turngemeinde in Berlin 1848
Medal record
Men's artistic gymnastics
Representing Germany
Olympic Games
| Gold medal – first place | 1896 Athens | Team parallel bars |
| Gold medal – first place | 1896 Athens | Team horizontal bar |

Georg Otto Hillmar (10 October 1876 in Berlin – 12 December 1911 in Berlin), commonly known as Georg Hillmar, was a German gymnast. He competed at the 1896 Summer Olympics in Athens. Hillmar won two gold medals as a member of the German team that won both of the team events, the parallel bars and the horizontal bar. He had less success in the individual events, contesting the parallel bars, horizontal bar, vault, and pommel horse without earning any medals.
