= Alfred Flatow =

German gymnast (1869–1942)

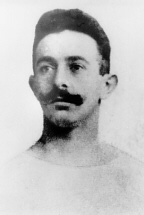

Personal information
- Born: 3 October 1869 Danzig, Kingdom of Prussia
- Died: 28 December 1942 (aged 73) KZ Theresienstadt, Nazi Germany
- Relatives: Gustav Flatow (cousin)

Gymnastics career
- Discipline: Men's artistic gymnastics
- Country represented: Germany
Medal record
Men's artistic gymnastics
Representing Germany
Olympic Games
Gold medal – first place	1896 Athens	Team parallel bars
Gold medal – first place	1896 Athens	Team horizontal bar
Gold medal – first place	1896 Athens	Parallel bars
Silver medal – second place	1896 Athens	Horizontal bar

Alfred Flatow (3 October 1869 – 28 December 1942) was a Jewish German gymnast. He competed at the 1896 Summer Olympics in Athens. He was murdered in the Holocaust.

== Biography ==
Flatow was a successful competitor in 1896. He won the parallel bars, was the runner-up in the horizontal bar, and was a member of the German team that took the gold medals in both the parallel bars and the horizontal bar team events. He also competed in the vault, pommel horse, and rings competitions. Flatow's cousin, Gustav Flatow, was also a member of the German gymnastics delegation in 1896.

After his return to Germany, he and most of the other German gymnasts were suspended because the Deutsche Turnerschaft (at this time the governing body of German gymnastics) boycotted the Olympic Games on the grounds that competing was "unGerman."

In 1903, Flatow was a co-founder of the Jüdische Turnerschaft, the historic and pioneering Jewish sports organization in Europe. A gymnastics teacher since 1890, he started writing books about his sport in the early 20th century. In 1933, Flatow was forced to end his gymnastics club membership "voluntarily", as he was Jewish. He was prominent in German gymnastics until expelled by the Nazis in 1936. He was nevertheless honoured at the 1936 Olympics, where all German Olympic champions were invited.

Flatow emigrated from Germany to the Netherlands in 1938 due to Nazi persecution of Germany's Jewish community. The Netherlands was invaded by Nazi Germany in May 1940. On 3 October 1942, Flatow was deported to Theresienstadt concentration camp in spite of appeals by the highly placed gymnastics official Christian Busch. He died there of starvation at the age of 73 before the end of the year. His cousin Gustav Flatow was also murdered in the Holocaust. Alfred died in Theresienstadt Ghetto on 28 December 1942, and Gustav on 29 January 1945.

== Honours after death ==
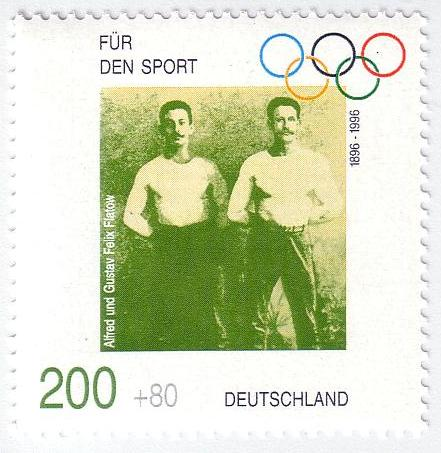
Alfred and Gustav Flatow on a German stamp

In 1981, he was inducted into the International Jewish Sports Hall of Fame.

In 1997, Berlin honoured Alfred and Gustav Flatow by renaming the Reichssportfeldstraße (a lane) near the Olympic Stadium to Flatowallee (Flatow-avenue). There is also the Flatow-Sporthalle (sports hall) at Berlin-Kreuzberg with a commemorative plaque for both. The Deutsche Post issued a set of four stamps to celebrate the 100th anniversary of the modern Olympic Games. One of these stamps shows the Flatows.

== See also ==
- List of select Jewish gymnasts
