= Horizontal bar =

Apparatus used in men's artistic gymnastics

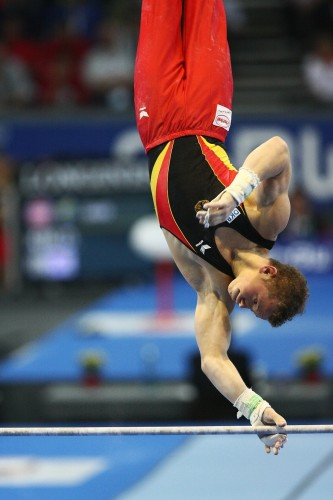
Fabian Hambüchen at the horizontal bar

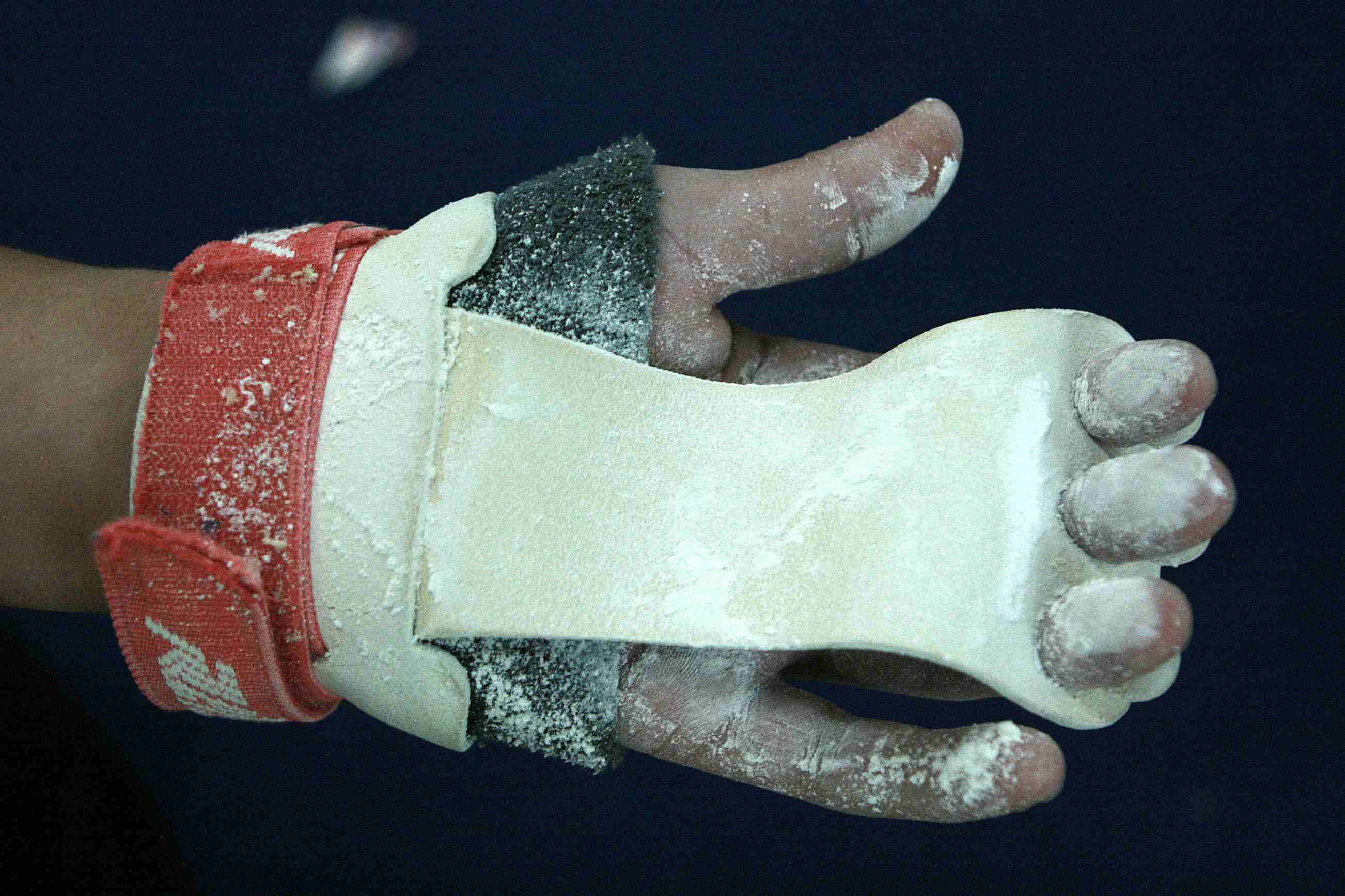
A bar grip (front view)

The horizontal bar, also known as the high bar, is an apparatus used by male gymnasts in artistic gymnastics. It traditionally consists of a cylindrical metal (typically steel) bar that is rigidly held above and parallel to the floor by a system of cables and stiff vertical supports. Gymnasts typically wear suede leather grips while performing on the bar. The current elite-level competition uses a stainless steel core rail. The gymnastics elements performed on the horizontal bar are regulated by a Code of Points. A bar routine, which is a sequence of several bar skills, usually includes giants with various grips (overgrip, undergrip, dorsal grip, mixed grip), in-bar work, turns, release and regrasp skills, and a dismount. The horizontal bar is often considered one of the most exciting gymnastics events due to the power exhibited by gymnasts during giant swings and spectacular aerial releases and dismounts that frequently include multiple flips or twists and, in some cases, airborne travel over the bar.

== History ==
The horizontal bar was used by acrobats in ancient Greece and Rome and on through the Middle Ages. It was introduced into gymnastics by Johann Christoph Friedrich GutsMuths in his 1793 book Gymnastik für die Jugend, which in turn inspired further use and development by Friedrich Ludwig Jahn in 1811.

== Dimensions ==
The mechanical dimensions of the horizontal bar apparatus are specified in FIG's Apparatus Norms brochure:

- Height: 278 cm (109 in) (including about 30 cm (12 in) landing mats)
- Length: 240 cm (94 in)
- Diameter of the bar: 2.8 cm (1.1 in)

== Grips ==
How a gymnast grasps the horizontal bar is called the grip (not to be confused with the suede leather grips worn on the hands). Each grip is commonly used for a particular set of skills. When gymnasts compete on the horizontal bar, they are often required by the Code of Points to use specific grips.

- The overhand grip, or regular grip, is the standard grip used for the horizontal bar. On the overhand grip, the hands circle the bar with the backs of the hands facing the gymnast.
- A dorsal grip (also known as the dorsal hang) is an overhand grip employed while the gymnast's legs pass through the arms into a "skin the cat" position. The overhand grip is used in giant swings, and the dorsal grip in German Giant Swings.
- The reverse grip and underhand grip, is the opposite of the overhand grip. The palms of the hands face the gymnast. This grip is similar to the grip used in chin-ups. Forward giant swings are among the skills that use this grip.
- The elgrip is also an underhand grip, In an elgrip or L-Grip or eagle grip a gymnasts hands are turned 180 degrees outward from an over grip. Thumbs are turned out, but in the opposite direction of an undergrip. This position requires flexible shoulders to swing comfortably.
- The mixed grip combines the overhand and underhand grips with one hand in each position. This grip can be used to gain more height on release skills.
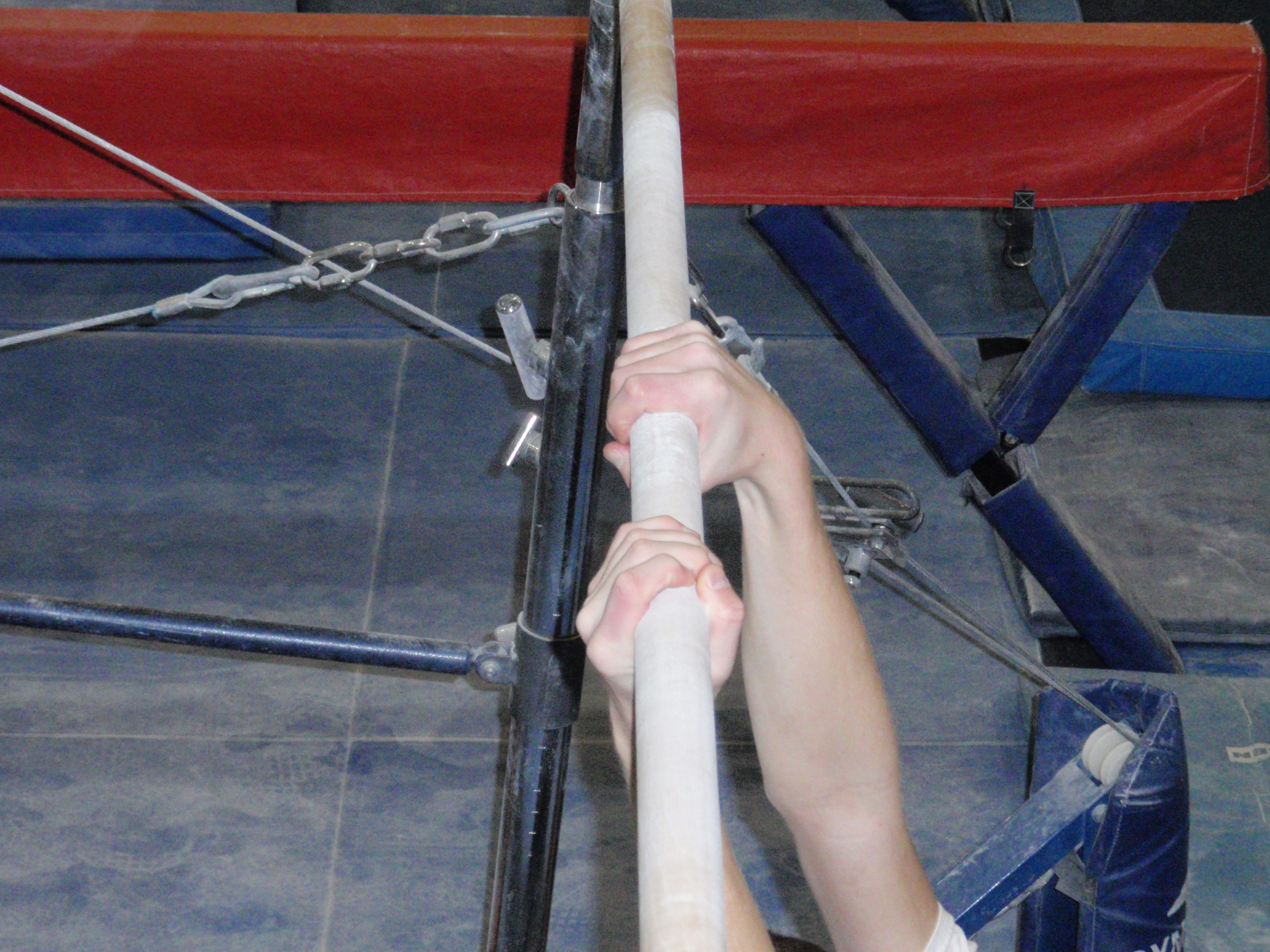
Mixed grip

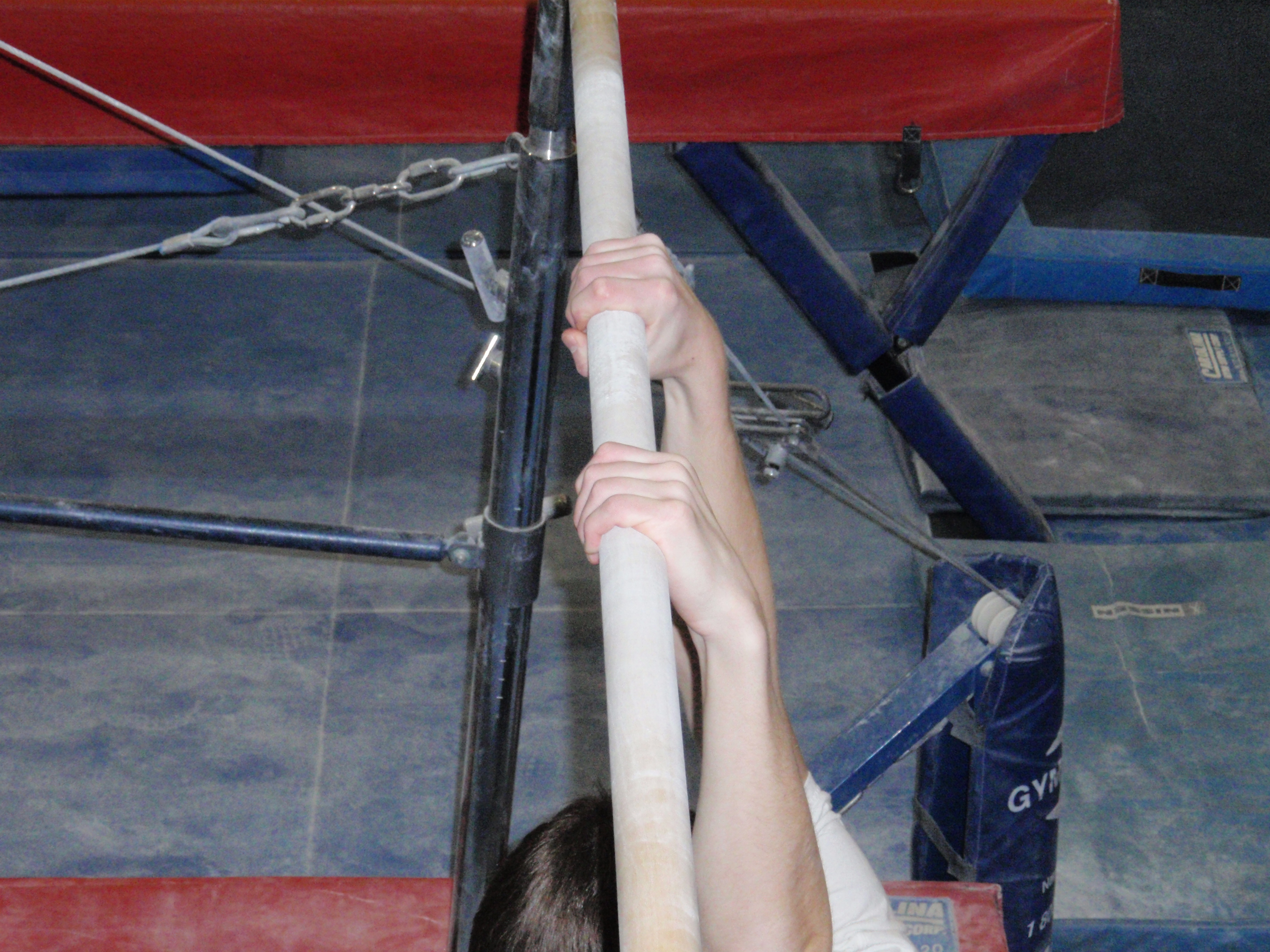
Overhand grip

== Routines ==
Under the FIG Code of Points for men's artistic gymnastics, horizontal bar routines are dynamic presentations demonstrating "the full potential of the apparatus." They consist of the fluid connection of swinging, turning, and flight elements performed without pauses near to and far from the bar in a variety of hand grips.

=== International level routines ===
A horizontal bar routine should contain at least one element from all element groups:

- I. Long hang swings with and without turns
- II. Flight elements
- III. In bar and Adler elements
- IV. Dismounts

=== Scoring and rules ===
Gymnasts receive deductions for lack of form and errors. Specific errors on the horizontal bar include bent or separated legs, pauses, low amplitude in flight elements, bent arms, regrips, elements not continuing in their intended direction, and deviations from the plane of movement.
