= List of Olympic medalists in tennis =

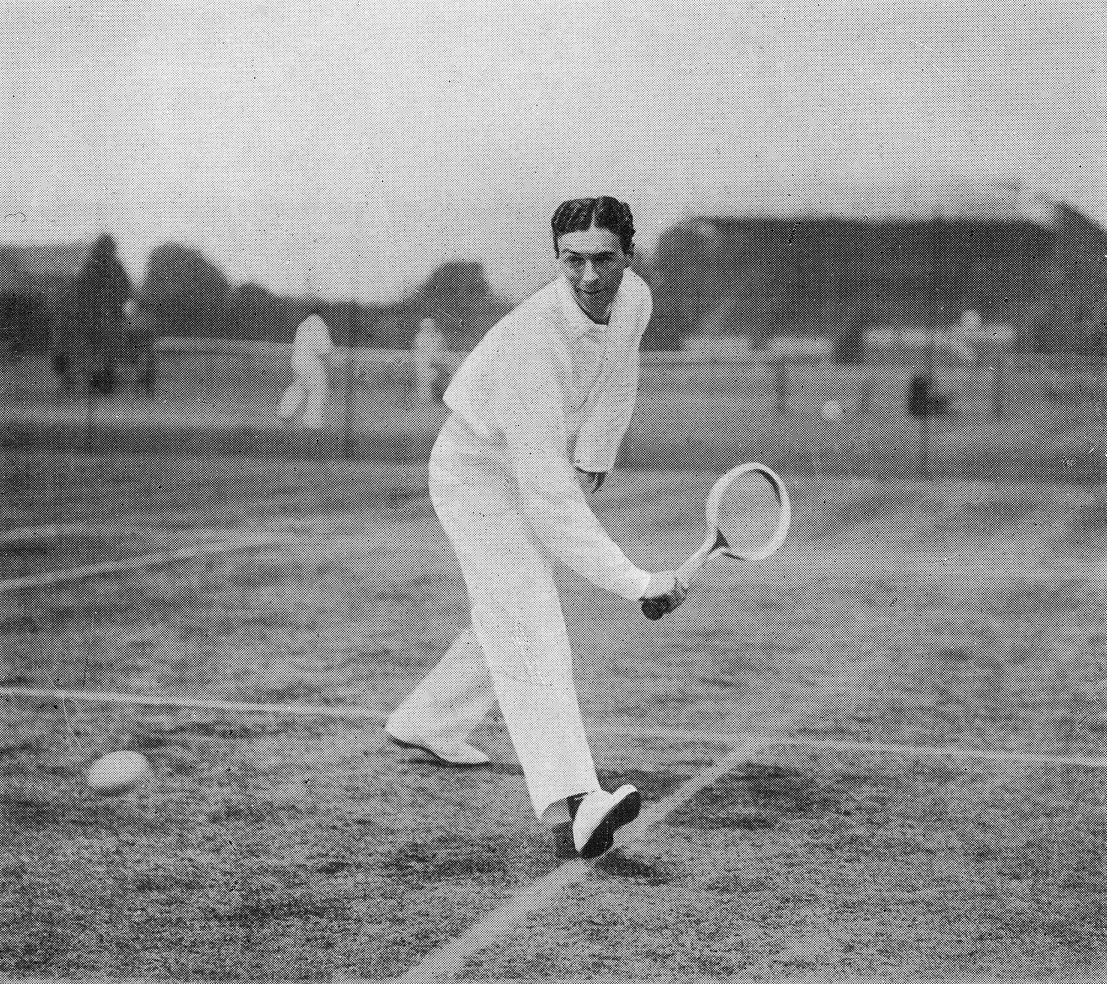
Reginald Doherty, four-time Olympic medalist

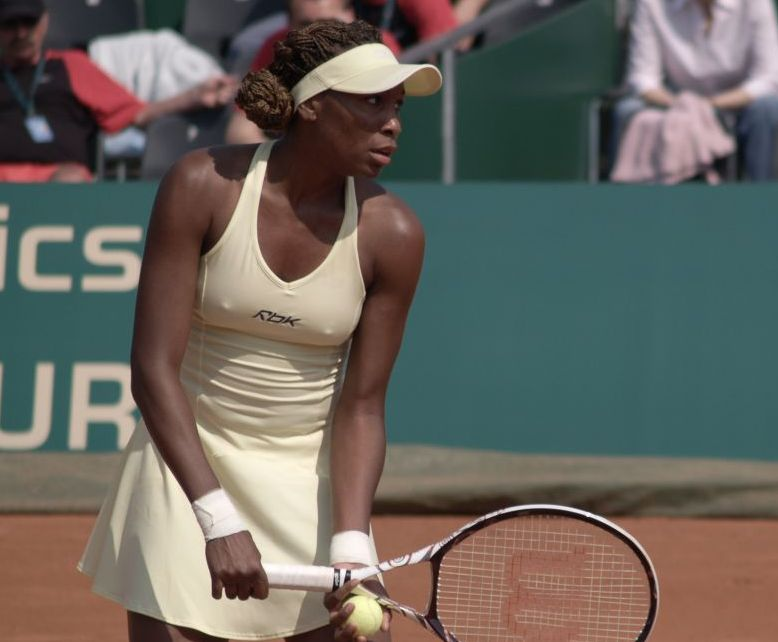
Venus Williams, five-time Olympic medalist

Tennis was first contested as a Summer Olympic sport in the 1896 Olympic Games until 1924 (excluding 1916 due to World War I), before going on hiatus due to disputes between the International Lawn Tennis Federation and the International Olympic Committee over how to define amateur players. After two appearances as a demonstration sport in 1968 and 1984 (with a U-21 age limit), it was reinstated as a full medal sport in 1988.

Kathleen McKane Godfree (one gold, two silvers, and two bronzes) and Venus Williams (four gold, one silver) are tied as the record holders for the most Olympic medals in tennis. Serena Williams and Venus Williams won a record four gold medals. Reginald Doherty is the record holder for most medals in men's tennis (three gold and one bronze). Andy Murray is the only player (male or female) to have won two singles gold medals.

Only on three occasions has a player defended their gold medal: Gigi Fernández and Mary Joe Fernández in women's doubles in 1992 and 1996, Serena Williams and Venus Williams in women's doubles in 2008 and 2012, and Andy Murray in the men's singles in 2012 and 2016.

== Olympic medalists ==
=== Amateur Era ===
==== 1896 ====
Event	Gold	Silver	Bronze
Men's singles	John Boland; Great Britain	Dionysios Kasdaglis; Greece	Konstantinos Paspatis; Greece
Men's singles	John Boland; Great Britain	Dionysios Kasdaglis; Greece	Momčilo Tapavica; Hungary
Men's doubles	Mixed team John Boland (GBR); Friedrich Traun (GER)	Greece; Demetrios Petrokokkinos; Dionysios Kasdaglis	Mixed team Edwin Flack (AUS); George Robertson (GBR)

==== 1900 ====
Event	Gold	Silver	Bronze
Men's singles	Laurence Doherty (GBR)	Harold Mahony (GBR)	Reginald Doherty (GBR)
Men's singles	Laurence Doherty (GBR)	Harold Mahony (GBR)	Arthur Norris (GBR)
Men's doubles	Great Britain; Laurence Doherty; Reginald Doherty	Mixed team Max Decugis (FRA); Basil Spalding de Garmendia (USA)	France; Guy de la Chapelle; André Prévost
Men's doubles	Great Britain; Laurence Doherty; Reginald Doherty	Mixed team Max Decugis (FRA); Basil Spalding de Garmendia (USA)	Great Britain; Harold Mahony; Arthur Norris
Women's singles	Charlotte Cooper (GBR)	Hélène Prévost (FRA)	Marion Jones Farquhar (USA)
Women's singles	Charlotte Cooper (GBR)	Hélène Prévost (FRA)	Hedwiga Rosenbaumová (BOH)
Mixed doubles	Great Britain; Charlotte Cooper; Reginald Doherty	Mixed team Hélène Prévost (FRA); Harold Mahony (GBR)	Mixed team Marion Jones Farquhar (USA); Laurence Doherty (GBR)
Mixed doubles	Great Britain; Charlotte Cooper; Reginald Doherty	Mixed team Hélène Prévost (FRA); Harold Mahony (GBR)	Mixed team Hedwiga Rosenbaumová (BOH); Archibald Warden (GBR)

==== 1904 ====
Event	Gold	Silver	Bronze
Men's singles	Beals Wright; United States	Robert LeRoy; United States	Alphonzo Bell; United States Edgar Leonard; United States
Men's doubles	United States; Beals Wright; Edgar Leonard	United States; Robert LeRoy; Alphonzo Bell	United States; Clarence Gamble; Arthur Wear United States; Joseph Wear; Allen West

==== 1908 ====
===== Outdoor =====
Event	Gold	Silver	Bronze
Men's outdoor singles	Major Ritchie; Great Britain	Otto Froitzheim; Germany	Wilberforce Eaves; Great Britain
Men's outdoor doubles	Great Britain; Reginald Doherty; George Hillyard	Great Britain; James Cecil Parke; Major Ritchie	Great Britain; Clement Cazalet; Charles Dixon
Women's outdoor singles	Dorothea Lambert Chambers; Great Britain	Dora Boothby; Great Britain	Ruth Winch; Great Britain

===== Indoor =====
Event	Gold	Silver	Bronze
Men's indoor singles	Arthur Gore; Great Britain	George Caridia; Great Britain	Major Ritchie; Great Britain
Men's indoor doubles	Great Britain; Herbert Roper Barrett; Arthur Gore	Great Britain; George Caridia; George Simond	Sweden; Wollmar Boström; Gunnar Setterwall
Women's indoor singles	Gwendoline Eastlake-Smith; Great Britain	Alice Greene; Great Britain	Märtha Adlerstråhle; Sweden

==== 1912 ====
===== Outdoor =====
Event	Gold	Silver	Bronze
Men's outdoor singles	Charles Winslow; South Africa	Harold Kitson; South Africa	Oscar Kreuzer; Germany
Men's outdoor doubles	South Africa; Harold Kitson; Charles Winslow	Austria; Felix Pipes; Arthur Zborzil	France; Albert Canet; Édouard Mény de Marangue
Women's outdoor singles	Marguerite Broquedis; France	Dorothea Köring; Germany	Molla Mallory; Norway
Mixed outdoor doubles	Germany; Dorothea Köring; Heinrich Schomburgk	Sweden; Sigrid Fick; Gunnar Setterwall	France; Marguerite Broquedis; Albert Canet

===== Indoor =====
Event	Gold	Silver	Bronze
Men's indoor singles	André Gobert; France	Charles Dixon; Great Britain	Anthony Wilding; Australasia
Men's indoor doubles	France; Maurice Germot; André Gobert	Sweden; Carl Kempe; Gunnar Setterwall	Great Britain; Alfred Beamish; Charles Dixon
Women's indoor singles	Edith Hannam; Great Britain	Sofie Castenschiold; Denmark	Mabel Parton; Great Britain
Mixed indoor doubles	Great Britain; Edith Hannam; Charles Dixon	Great Britain; Helen Aitchison; Herbert Roper Barrett	Sweden; Sigrid Fick; Gunnar Setterwall

==== 1920 ====
Event	Gold	Silver	Bronze
Men's singles	Louis Raymond; South Africa	Ichiya Kumagae; Japan	Charles Winslow; South Africa
Men's doubles	Great Britain; Noel Turnbull; Max Woosnam	Japan; Seiichiro Kashio; Ichiya Kumagae	France; Pierre Albarran; Max Decugis
Women's singles	Suzanne Lenglen; France	Dorothy Holman; Great Britain	Kathleen McKane; Great Britain
Women's doubles	Great Britain; Kathleen McKane; Winifred McNair	Great Britain; Winifred Beamish; Dorothy Holman	France; Élisabeth d'Ayen; Suzanne Lenglen
Mixed doubles	France; Suzanne Lenglen; Max Decugis	Great Britain; Kathleen McKane; Max Woosnam	Czechoslovakia; Milada Skrbková; Ladislav Žemla

==== 1924 ====
Event	Gold	Silver	Bronze
Men's singles	Vincent Richards; United States	Henri Cochet; France	Uberto De Morpurgo; Italy
Men's doubles	United States; Vincent Richards; Francis Hunter	France; Jacques Brugnon; Henri Cochet	France; Jean Borotra; René Lacoste
Women's singles	Helen Wills; United States	Julie Vlasto; France	Kathleen McKane; Great Britain
Women's doubles	United States; Hazel Wightman; Helen Wills	Great Britain; Phyllis Covell; Kathleen McKane	Great Britain; Evelyn Colyer; Dorothy Shepherd-Barron
Mixed doubles	United States; Hazel Wightman; R. Norris Williams	United States; Marion Jessup; Vincent Richards	Netherlands; Kea Bouman; Hendrik Timmer

=== Open Era ===
==== 1988 ====
Event	Gold	Silver	Bronze
Men's singles	Miloslav Mečíř; Czechoslovakia	Tim Mayotte; United States	Stefan Edberg; Sweden
Men's singles	Miloslav Mečíř; Czechoslovakia	Tim Mayotte; United States	Brad Gilbert; United States
Men's doubles	United States; Ken Flach; Robert Seguso	Spain; Emilio Sánchez; Sergio Casal	Czechoslovakia; Miloslav Mečíř; Milan Šrejber
Men's doubles	United States; Ken Flach; Robert Seguso	Spain; Emilio Sánchez; Sergio Casal	Sweden; Stefan Edberg; Anders Järryd
Women's singles	Steffi Graf; West Germany	Gabriela Sabatini; Argentina	Zina Garrison; United States
Women's singles	Steffi Graf; West Germany	Gabriela Sabatini; Argentina	Manuela Maleeva-Fragnière; Bulgaria
Women's doubles	United States; Pam Shriver; Zina Garrison	Czechoslovakia; Jana Novotná; Helena Suková	Australia; Elizabeth Smylie; Wendy Turnbull
Women's doubles	United States; Pam Shriver; Zina Garrison	Czechoslovakia; Jana Novotná; Helena Suková	West Germany; Steffi Graf; Claudia Kohde-Kilsch

==== 1992 ====
Event	Gold	Silver	Bronze
Men's singles	Marc Rosset; Switzerland	Jordi Arrese; Spain	Goran Ivanišević; Croatia
Men's singles	Marc Rosset; Switzerland	Jordi Arrese; Spain	Andrei Cherkasov; Unified Team (Russia)
Men's doubles	Germany; Boris Becker; Michael Stich	South Africa; Wayne Ferreira; Piet Norval	Croatia; Goran Ivanišević; Goran Prpić
Men's doubles	Germany; Boris Becker; Michael Stich	South Africa; Wayne Ferreira; Piet Norval	Argentina; Javier Frana; Christian Miniussi
Women's singles	Jennifer Capriati; United States	Steffi Graf; Germany	Mary Joe Fernández; United States
Women's singles	Jennifer Capriati; United States	Steffi Graf; Germany	Arantxa Sánchez Vicario; Spain
Women's doubles	United States; Gigi Fernández; Mary Joe Fernández	Spain; Conchita Martínez; Arantxa Sánchez Vicario	Unified Team; Leila Meskhi; Natasha Zvereva
Women's doubles	United States; Gigi Fernández; Mary Joe Fernández	Spain; Conchita Martínez; Arantxa Sánchez Vicario	Australia; Nicole Bradtke; Rachel McQuillan

==== 1996 ====
Event	Gold	Silver	Bronze
Men's singles	Andre Agassi; United States	Sergi Bruguera; Spain	Leander Paes; India
Men's doubles	Australia; Todd Woodbridge; Mark Woodforde	Great Britain; Neil Broad; Tim Henman	Germany; Marc-Kevin Goellner; David Prinosil
Women's singles	Lindsay Davenport; United States	Arantxa Sánchez Vicario; Spain	Jana Novotná; Czech Republic
Women's doubles	United States; Gigi Fernández; Mary Joe Fernández	Czech Republic; Jana Novotná; Helena Suková	Spain; Conchita Martínez; Arantxa Sánchez Vicario

==== 2000 ====
Event	Gold	Silver	Bronze
Men's singles	Yevgeny Kafelnikov; Russia	Tommy Haas; Germany	Arnaud Di Pasquale; France
Men's doubles	Canada; Sébastien Lareau; Daniel Nestor	Australia; Todd Woodbridge; Mark Woodforde	Spain; Àlex Corretja; Albert Costa
Women's singles	Venus Williams; United States	Elena Dementieva; Russia	Monica Seles; United States
Women's doubles	United States; Venus Williams; Serena Williams	Netherlands; Kristie Boogert; Miriam Oremans	Belgium; Els Callens; Dominique Van Roost

==== 2004 ====
Event	Gold	Silver	Bronze
Men's singles	Nicolás Massú; Chile	Mardy Fish; United States	Fernando González; Chile
Men's doubles	Chile; Fernando González; Nicolás Massú	Germany; Nicolas Kiefer; Rainer Schüttler	Croatia; Mario Ančić; Ivan Ljubičić
Women's singles	Justine Henin; Belgium	Amélie Mauresmo; France	Alicia Molik; Australia
Women's doubles	China; Li Ting; Sun Tiantian	Spain; Conchita Martínez; Virginia Ruano Pascual	Argentina; Paola Suárez; Patricia Tarabini

==== 2008 ====
Event	Gold	Silver	Bronze
Men's singles	Rafael Nadal; Spain	Fernando González; Chile	Novak Djokovic; Serbia
Men's doubles	Switzerland; Roger Federer; Stanislas Wawrinka	Sweden; Simon Aspelin; Thomas Johansson	United States; Bob Bryan; Mike Bryan
Women's singles	Elena Dementieva; Russia	Dinara Safina; Russia	Vera Zvonareva; Russia
Women's doubles	United States; Serena Williams; Venus Williams	Spain; Anabel Medina Garrigues; Virginia Ruano Pascual	China; Yan Zi; Zheng Jie

==== 2012 ====
Event	Gold	Silver	Bronze
Men's singles	Andy Murray; Great Britain	Roger Federer; Switzerland	Juan Martín del Potro; Argentina
Men's doubles	United States; Bob Bryan; Mike Bryan	France; Michaël Llodra; Jo-Wilfried Tsonga	France; Julien Benneteau; Richard Gasquet
Women's singles	Serena Williams; United States	Maria Sharapova; Russia	Victoria Azarenka; Belarus
Women's doubles	United States; Serena Williams; Venus Williams	Czech Republic; Andrea Hlaváčková; Lucie Hradecká	Russia; Maria Kirilenko; Nadia Petrova
Mixed doubles	Belarus; Victoria Azarenka; Max Mirnyi	Great Britain; Laura Robson; Andy Murray	United States; Lisa Raymond; Mike Bryan

==== 2016 ====
Event	Gold	Silver	Bronze
Men's singles	Andy Murray; Great Britain	Juan Martín del Potro; Argentina	Kei Nishikori; Japan
Men's doubles	Spain; Marc López; Rafael Nadal	Romania; Florin Mergea; Horia Tecău	United States; Steve Johnson; Jack Sock
Women's singles	Monica Puig; Puerto Rico	Angelique Kerber; Germany	Petra Kvitová; Czech Republic
Women's doubles	Russia; Ekaterina Makarova; Elena Vesnina	Switzerland; Timea Bacsinszky; Martina Hingis	Czech Republic; Lucie Šafářová; Barbora Strýcová
Mixed doubles	United States; Bethanie Mattek-Sands; Jack Sock	United States; Venus Williams; Rajeev Ram	Czech Republic; Lucie Hradecká; Radek Štěpánek

==== 2020 ====
Event	Gold	Silver	Bronze
Men's singles	Alexander Zverev; Germany	Karen Khachanov; ROC	Pablo Carreño Busta; Spain
Men's doubles	Croatia; Nikola Mektić; Mate Pavić	Croatia; Marin Čilić; Ivan Dodig	New Zealand; Marcus Daniell; Michael Venus
Women's singles	Belinda Bencic; Switzerland	Markéta Vondroušová; Czech Republic	Elina Svitolina; Ukraine
Women's doubles	Czech Republic; Barbora Krejčíková; Kateřina Siniaková	Switzerland; Belinda Bencic; Viktorija Golubic	Brazil; Laura Pigossi; Luisa Stefani
Mixed doubles	ROC (ROC); Anastasia Pavlyuchenkova; Andrey Rublev	ROC (ROC); Elena Vesnina; Aslan Karatsev	Australia; Ashleigh Barty; John Peers

==== 2024 ====
Event	Gold	Silver	Bronze
Men's singles	Novak Djokovic; Serbia	Carlos Alcaraz; Spain	Lorenzo Musetti; Italy
Men's doubles	Australia; Matthew Ebden; John Peers	United States; Austin Krajicek; Rajeev Ram	United States; Taylor Fritz; Tommy Paul
Women's singles	Zheng Qinwen; China	Donna Vekić; Croatia	Iga Świątek; Poland
Women's doubles	Italy; Sara Errani; Jasmine Paolini	Individual Neutral Athletes; Mirra Andreeva; Diana Shnaider	Spain; Cristina Bucșa; Sara Sorribes Tormo
Mixed doubles	Czech Republic; Kateřina Siniaková; Tomáš Macháč	China; Wang Xinyu; Zhang Zhizhen	Canada; Gabriela Dabrowski; Félix Auger-Aliassime

== Athlete medal leaders ==
Players currently active in bold.

=== Men leaders ===
Rank	Athlete	Nation	Olympics	Gold	Silver	Bronze	Total
1	Reginald Doherty	Great Britain	1900–1908	3	0	1	4
2	Vincent Richards	United States	1924	2	1	0	3
2	Andy Murray	Great Britain	2008–2024	2	1	0	3
4	Laurence Doherty	Great Britain	1900	2	0	1	3
4	Charles Winslow	South Africa	1912–1920	2	0	1	3
6	Nicolás Massú	Chile	2000–2008	2	0	0	2
6	Rafael Nadal	Spain	2004–2024	2	0	0	2
8	Charles Dixon	Great Britain	1908–1912	1	1	2	4
9	Max Décugis	France	1900–1920	1	1	1	3
9	Fernando González	Chile	2004–2008	1	1	1	3

==== Men's singles leaders ====
† Multiple singles medalist.

#	Gold medals
2	(United Kingdom) Andy Murray^{†}
1	(United Kingdom) John Boland
1	(United Kingdom) Laurence Doherty
1	(United States) Beals Wright
1	(United Kingdom) Josiah Ritchie
1	(United States) Charles Winslow
1	(South Africa) Louis Raymond
1	(United States) Vincent Richards
1	(Czechoslovakia) Miloslav Mečíř
1	(Switzerland) Marc Rosset
1	(United States) Andre Agassi
1	(Russia) Yevgeny Kafelnikov
1	(Chile) Nicolás Massú
1	(Spain) Rafael Nadal
1	(Germany) **Alexander Zverev**
1	**(Serbia) Novak Djokovic**^{†}

#	Silver medals
1	(Greece) Dionysios Kasdaglis
1	(United Kingdom) Harold Mahony
1	(United States) Robert LeRoy
1	(Germany) Otto Froitzheim
1	(South Africa) Harold Kitson
1	(Japan) Ichiya Kumagae
1	(France) Henri Cochet
1	(United States) Tim Mayotte
1	(Spain) Jordi Arrese
1	(Spain) Sergi Bruguera
1	(Germany) Tommy Haas
1	(United States) Mardy Fish
1	(Chile) Fernando González^{†}
1	(Switzerland) Roger Federer
1	(Argentina) Juan Martin Del Potro^{†}
1	(Russia) **Karen Khachanov**
1	**(Spain) Carlos Alcaraz**

#	Bronze medals
1	(Hungary) Momčilo Tapavica (Greece) Konstantinos Paspatis
1	(United Kingdom) Reginald Doherty (United Kingdom) Arthur Norris
1	(United States) Alphonzo Bell (United States) Edgar Leonard
1	(United Kingdom) Wilberforce Eaves
1	(Germany) Oscar Kreuzer
1	(South Africa) Charles Winslow
1	(Italy) Umberto De Morpurgo
1	(Sweden) Stefan Edberg (United States) Brad Gilbert
1	(Soviet Union) Andrei Cherkasov (Croatia) Goran Ivanišević
1	(India) Leander Paes
1	(France) Arnaud Di Pasquale
1	(Chile) Fernando González^{†}
1	**(Serbia) Novak Djokovic**^{†}
1	(Argentina) Juan Martin Del Potro^{†}
1	**(Japan) Kei Nishikori**
1	**(Spain) Pablo Carreño Busta**
1	**(Italy) Lorenzo Musetti**

=== Women leaders ===
Rank	Athlete	Nation	Olympics	Gold	Silver	Bronze	Total
1	**Venus Williams**	United States	2000–2016	4	1	0	5
2	Serena Williams	United States	2000–2016	4	0	0	4
3	Gigi Fernández	United States	1992–1996	2	0	0	2
3	Mary Joe Fernández	United States	1992–1996	2	0	1	3
3	**Kateřina Siniaková**	Czech Republic	2020–2024	2	0	0	2
6	Kathleen McKane Godfree	Great Britain	1920–1924	1	2	2	5
7	Steffi Graf	West Germany /	1988-1992	1	1	1	3
8	**Belinda Bencic**	Switzerland	2020	1	1	0	2
9	Arantxa Sánchez Vicario	Spain	1992–1996	0	2	2	4
10	Conchita Martínez	Spain	1992–2004	0	2	1	3
10	Jana Novotná	Czechoslovakia / (Czech Republic)	1988–1996	0	2	1	3

==== Women's singles leaders ====
† Multiple singles medalist.

#	Gold medals
1	(United Kingdom) Charlotte Cooper
1	(United Kingdom) Dorothea Douglass
1	(France) Marguerite Broquedis
1	(France) Suzanne Lenglen
1	(United States) Helen Wills
1	(Germany) Steffi Graf^{†}
1	(United States) Jennifer Capriati
1	(United States) Lindsay Davenport
1	**(United States) Venus Williams**
1	(Belgium) Justine Henin
1	(Russia) Elena Dementieva^{†}
1	(United States) Serena Williams
1	(Puerto Rico) Monica Puig
1	**(Switzerland) Belinda Bencic**
1	**(China) Zheng Qinwen**

#	Silver medals
1	(France) Hélène Prévost
1	(United Kingdom) Dora Boothby
1	(Germany) Dorothea Köring
1	(United Kingdom) Dorothy Holman
1	(France) Julie Vlasto
1	(Argentina) Gabriela Sabatini
1	(Germany) Steffi Graf
1	(Spain) Arantxa Sánchez Vicario^{†}
1	(Russia) Elena Dementieva
1	(France) Amélie Mauresmo
1	(Russia) Dinara Safina
1	(Russia) Maria Sharapova
1	(Germany) Angelique Kerber
1	**(Czech Republic) Markéta Vondroušová**
1	**(Croatia) Donna Vekić**

#	Bronze medals
2	(United Kingdom) Kitty McKane^{†}
1	(United States) Marion Jones (Bohemia) Hedwiga Rosenbaumová
1	(United Kingdom) Ruth Winch
1	(Norway) Molla Bjurstedt
1	(United States) Zina Garrison (Bulgaria) Manuela Maleeva
1	(United States) Mary Joe Fernández (Spain) Arantxa Sánchez Vicario
1	(Czech Republic) Jana Novotná
1	(United States) Monica Seles
1	(Australia) Alicia Molik
1	**(Russia) Vera Zvonareva**
1	**(Belarus) Victoria Azarenka**
1	**(Czech Republic) Petra Kvitová**
1	**(Ukraine) Elina Svitolina**
1	**(Poland) Iga Świątek**

== Medal table ==
Rank	Nation	Gold	Silver	Bronze	Total
1	United States	21	7	13	41
2	Great Britain	17	14	12	43
3	France	5	6	8	19
4	Germany	3	6	2	11
5	Russia	3	3	2	8
6	Switzerland	3	3	0	6
7	South Africa	3	2	1	6
8	Spain	2	8	5	15
9	Czech Republic	2	3	4	9
10	Australia	2	1	4	7
11	Chile	2	1	1	4
11	China	2	1	1	4
13	Croatia	1	2	3	6
13	Mixed team	1	2	3	6
15	ROC (ROC)	1	2	0	3
16	Czechoslovakia	1	1	2	4
17	Italy	1	0	2	3
18	Belarus	1	0	1	2
18	Belgium	1	0	1	2
18	Canada	1	0	1	2
18	Serbia	1	0	1	2
18	West Germany	1	0	1	2
23	Puerto Rico	1	0	0	1
24	Sweden	0	3	5	8
25	Argentina	0	2	3	5
26	Greece	0	2	1	3
26	Japan	0	2	1	3
28	Netherlands	0	1	1	2
29	Austria	0	1	0	1
29	Denmark	0	1	0	1
29	Romania	0	1	0	1
–	Individual Neutral Athletes	0	1	0	1
32	Unified Team	0	0	2	2
33	Australasia	0	0	1	1
33	Bohemia	0	0	1	1
33	Brazil	0	0	1	1
33	Bulgaria	0	0	1	1
33	Hungary	0	0	1	1
33	India	0	0	1	1
33	New Zealand	0	0	1	1
33	Norway	0	0	1	1
33	Poland	0	0	1	1
33	Ukraine	0	0	1	1
Totals (42 entries)		76	76	91	243

== See also ==
- Tennis at the 1906 Intercalated Games — these Intercalated Games are no longer regarded as official Games by the International Olympic Committee
- Wheelchair tennis at the Summer Paralympics#Medalists
- List of American tennis players at the Summer Olympics
- List of Canadian tennis players at the Summer Olympics
- List of Indian tennis players at the Summer Olympics
- List of New Zealand tennis players at the Summer Olympics
- List of South African tennis players at the Summer Olympics
- List of Zimbabwean tennis players at the Summer Olympics

== Notes ==
^a The Olympic medal table is ranked first by the number of gold medals won and then by silver and bronze medals if there is a tie.
