= Great Britain at the 1896 Summer Olympics =

- Flag of the United Kingdom
- IOC code: GBR
- NOC: British Olympic Association

in Athens, Greece 6 April 1896 – 15 April 1896
- Competitors: 10 in 7 sports and 19 events
- Medals: Gold 2 Silver 3 Bronze 2 Total 7

Summer Olympics appearances (overview)
- 1896; 1900; 1904; 1908; 1912; 1920; 1924; 1928; 1932; 1936; 1948; 1952; 1956; 1960; 1964; 1968; 1972; 1976; 1980; 1984; 1988; 1992; 1996; 2000; 2004; 2008; 2012; 2016; 2020; 2024; 2028

Other related appearances
- 1906 Intercalated Games

Ten athletes from the United Kingdom of Great Britain and Ireland competed in seven sports at the 1896 Summer Olympics. The Great Britain athletes were the fifth most successful in terms of overall medals (7) and tied for fifth in gold medals (2). The 7 medals came on 23 entries in 14 events.

Two tennis players (one English, one Irish) also played in mixed team squads, contributing to a gold and a bronze medal. These medals are not counted as part of the Great Britain total.

== Medallists ==
The following competitors won medals at the games. In the discipline sections below, the medalists' names are bolded. Medals awarded to participants of mixed-NOC teams are represented in italics. These medals are not counted towards the individual NOC medal tally.

Medal	Name	Sport	Event	Date
Gold	John Pius Boland	Tennis	Singles	April 11
Gold	John Pius Boland	Tennis	Doubles	April 11
Gold	Launceston Elliot	Weightlifting	One hand lift	April 7
Silver	Grantley Goulding	Athletics	110 m hurdles	April 10
Silver	Frederick Keeping	Cycling	12 hour race	April 13
Silver	Launceston Elliot	Weightlifting	Two hand lift	April 7
Bronze	Charles Gmelin	Athletics	400 m	April 7
Bronze	Edward Battell	Cycling	Road race	April 12
Bronze	George S. Robertson	Tennis	Doubles	April 9

Medals by sport
Sport	1st place, gold medalist(s)	2nd place, silver medalist(s)	3rd place, bronze medalist(s)	Total
Athletics	0	1	1	**2**
Cycling	0	1	1	**2**
Tennis	1	0	0	**1**
Weightlifting	1	1	0	**2**
Total	2	3	2	7

=== Multiple medalists ===
The following competitors won multiple medals at the 1896 Olympic Games.

Name	Medal	Sport	Event
Launceston Elliot	Gold; Silver	Weightlifting	Men's one hand lift Men's two hand lift

== Competitors ==
The following is the list of number of competitors in the Games.

Sport	Men	Women	Total
Athletics	5	0	5
Cycling	2	0	2
Gymnastics	1	0	1
Shooting	2	0	2
Tennis	2	0	2
Weightlifting	1	0	1
Wrestling	1	0	1
Total	10	0	10

Medals by day
Day	Date	1st place, gold medalist(s)	2nd place, silver medalist(s)	3rd place, bronze medalist(s)	Total
1	6 April	0	0	0	0
2	7 April	1	1	1	3
3	8 April	0	0	0	0
4	9 April	0	0	0	0
5	10 April	0	1	0	0
6	11 April	1	0	0	1
7	12 April	0	0	1	1
8	13 April	0	1	0	0
Total		2	3	2	7

== Athletics ==
Track & road events

Athlete	Event	Heat		Final	
Athlete	Event	Time	Rank	Time	Rank
Launceston Elliot	100 m	12.9	3	Did not advance	
Charles Gmelin	100 m	12.9	3	Did not advance	
George Marshall	100 m	Unknown	5	Did not advance	
Launceston Elliot	400 m	DNS		Did not advance	
Charles Gmelin	400 m	1:00.5	2 Q	56.7	3rd place, bronze medalist(s)
Grantley Goulding	400 m	DNS		Did not advance	
George Marshall	400 m	DNS		Did not advance	
George Marshall	800 m	Unknown	4	Did not advance	
George Marshall	1500 m	—N/a		DNS	
Grantley Goulding	110 m hurdles	18.4	1 Q	17.7	2nd place, silver medalist(s)

Field events

Athlete	Event	Final	
Athlete	Event	Distance	Position
George S. Robertson	Men's shot put	DNS	
George S. Robertson	Men's discus throw	25.20	4

== Cycling ==
=== Track ===
Athlete	Event	Time / Distance	Rank
Edward Battell	Men's time trial	26.2	4
Frederick Keeping	Men's time trial	27.0	=5
Edward Battell	100 km	DNF	
Frederick Keeping	Men's 12 hour race	294.946 km	2nd place, silver medalist(s)

=== Road ===
Athlete	Event	Time	Rank
Edward Battell	Men's road race	Unknown	3rd place, bronze medalist(s)
Frederick Keeping	Men's road race	DNS	

== Gymnastics ==
Individual

Athlete	Event	Result	Rank
Launceston Elliot	Men's rope climbing	Unknown	5

== Fencing ==
Athlete	Event	Record		Touches		Rank
Athlete	Event	Wins	Losses	For	Against	Rank
Edgar Seligman	Sabre	DNS				

== Shooting ==
Merlin and Machonet were unable to win any medals in the shooting events.

Athlete	Event	Final	
Athlete	Event	Score	Rank
Machonet	Men's 200 m military rifle	Unknown	14-41
Sidney Merlin	Men's 200 m military rifle	1156	10
Sidney Merlin	Men's 300 m free rifle	Unknown	6-18
Sidney Merlin	Men's 25 m military pistol	DNF	
Sidney Merlin	Men's 25 m rapid fire pistol	DNF	

== Swimming ==
Athlete	Event	Final	
Athlete	Event	Time	Rank
H.F Suter	100 m freestyle	DNS	
H.F Suter	500 m freestyle	DNS	

== Tennis ==
Boland (later best known as an Irish nationalist politician) was by far the best player in the tennis competition, amassing a 6-0 record over both events and two gold medals, though one of them was as part of a mixed team. He defeated Traun in the first round of the singles competition, then teamed up with him for the doubles competition. Robertson was much less successful, losing both of the matches he played, though he was awarded a retroactive bronze medal by the International Olympic Committee as his bye in the doubles quarterfinals put him in third place in that event. Like Boland's doubles gold medal, Robertson's bronze is not counted as part of the British total because the two played on mixed teams. Some sources include George Marshall and his brother Frank; the two were entered but appear to have not competed.

Athlete	Event	First round	Quarterfinals	Semifinals	Final	
Athlete	Event	Opposition Score	Opposition Score	Opposition Score	Opposition Score	Rank
John Boland	Singles	Traun (GER); W 6–0, 2–6, 6–2	Rallis (GRE); W	Paspatis (GRE); W	Kasdaglis (GRE); W 6-3, 6,1	1st place, gold medalist(s)
George S. Robertson	Singles	Paspatis (GRE); L	Did not advance			
Frank Marshall	Singles	DNS				
George Marshall	Singles	DNS				
John Boland (GBR); Friedrich Traun (GER)	Doubles	—N/a	Akratopoulos / Akratopoulos (GRE) W	Bye	Kasdaglis / Petrokokkinos (GRE); W 5-7, 6-4, 6-1	1st place, gold medalist(s)
George S. Robertson (GBR); Edwin Flack (AUS)	Doubles	—N/a	Bye	Kasdaglis / Petrokokkinos (GRE); L	Did not advance	3rd place, bronze medalist(s)

== Weightlifting ==
Elliot (born in British India of Scottish ancestry) lifted the same amount as Viggo Jensen in the two handed lift, but was declared by Prince George of Greece to have taken second place based on lifting form. In the one handed lift, he easily defeated Jensen, who lifted only 57 kilograms.

Athlete	Event	Result	Rank
Launceston Elliot	Men's one hand lift	71.0	1st place, gold medalist(s)
Launceston Elliot	Men's two hand lift	111.5	2nd place, silver medalist(s)

== Wrestling ==
Elliot was defeated by eventual champion Carl Schuhmann in the first round of the wrestling competition, tying for 4th and last place.

Athlete	Event	Quarterfinal	Semifinal	Final	
Athlete	Event	Opposition Result	Opposition Result	Opposition Result	Rank
Launceston Elliot	Men's Greco-Roman	Schuhmann (GER); L	Did not advance		=4
