= 1896 Summer Olympics medal table =

1896 Summer Olympics medals
- Location: Athens, Greece

Highlights
- Most gold medals: United States (11)
- Most total medals: Greece (47)
- Medalling NOCs: 11

World map showing the medal achievements of each country during the 1896 Summer Olympics Legend: represents countries that won at least one gold medal. represents participating countries that did not win medals. represents entities that did not participate at the 1896 Summer Olympics.

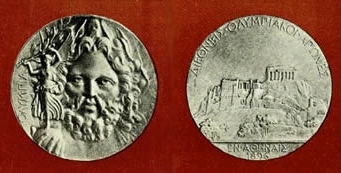
A silver medal was awarded to the winner of each event during the 1896 Summer Olympics in Athens, Greece.

The 1896 Summer Olympics, officially known as the Games of the I Olympiad, were a summer multi-sport event held in Athens, the capital of Greece, from 6 to 15 April 1896, and were the first Olympic Games of the Modern era.

A total of 241 athletes from 14 nations participated in 43 events in nine sports at these games.

Ten of the fourteen participating nations earned medals, and three medals were won by mixed teams, i.e., teams made up of athletes from multiple nations. The United States won the most gold medals (11) with 14 athletes participating. In contrast, the host nation, Greece, with 169 athletes participating, won the most medals overall (47) as well as the most silver (18) and bronze (19) medals, finishing with one less gold medal than the United States, having 155 athletes more than the U.S.

== Background and rules ==
In the early Olympic Games, several team events were contested by athletes from multiple nations. Retroactively, the IOC created the designation "Mixed team" (with the country code ZZX) to refer to this group of athletes. Some athletes won medals individually and as part of a mixed team, so these medals are tabulated under different nations in the official counts. Dionysios Kasdaglis, an athlete of Greek origins living in Alexandria, Egypt, is listed by the IOC as Greek during both his competition in the singles tennis competition and the doubles tennis competition along with his teammate, the Greek athlete Demetrios Petrokokkinos.

During these inaugural Olympics, winners were given a silver medal and an olive branch, while runners-up received a copper medal and a laurel branch. The IOC has retroactively assigned gold, silver and bronze medals to the three best-placed athletes in each event to comply with more recent traditions.

Three ties resulted in athletes sharing medals, increasing the medal count of various nations. These include ties between Francis Lane of the United States and Alajos Szokolyi of Hungary, for the third place in the 100 metres, and between Evangelos Damaskos and Ioannis Theodoropoulos of Greece in the pole vault, as well as bronze medals awarded to both losing semi-finalists, Konstantinos Paspatis of Greece and Momcsilló Tapavicza of Hungary, in singles tennis. In addition, five of the bronze medalists at the Games are unknown – two in swimming and three in gymnastics – and several events had no third-place finisher.

== Medal count ==
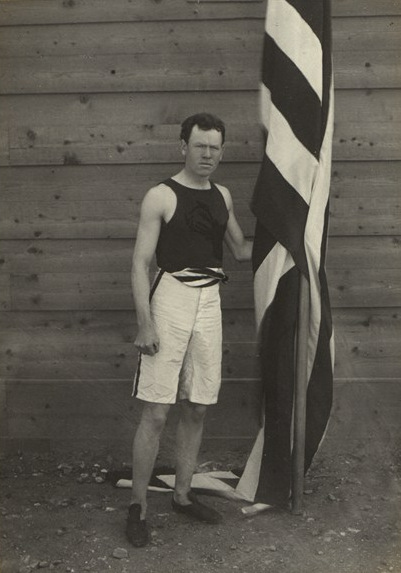
James Connolly of the United States won the triple jump event at the 1896 Summer Olympics.

This is the full table of the medal count of the 1896 Summer Olympics, based on the International Olympic Committee (IOC) medal count. Some sources, besides the International Olympic Committee (IOC), that display variations in the medal totals, but as the governing body of the Olympic Games, the IOC is considered the most authoritative source for this article. These rankings are sorted by the number of gold medals a country earns. The number of silver medals is considered next, and then the number of bronze medals. If, after the above, countries are still tied, equal ranking is given, and they are listed alphabetically. The IOC provides this information; however, the IOC does not recognise or endorse any ranking system.

* Host nation (Greece)

1896 Summer Olympics medal table
Rank	Nation	Gold	Silver	Bronze	Total
1	United States	11	7	2	20
2	Greece*	10	18	19	47
3	Germany	6	5	2	13
4	France	5	4	2	11
5	Great Britain	2	3	2	7
6	Hungary	2	1	3	6
7	Austria	2	1	2	5
8	Australia	2	0	0	2
9	Denmark	1	2	3	6
10	Switzerland	1	2	0	3
11	Mixed team	1	0	1	2
Totals (11 entries)		43	43	36	122
