= Egypt at the 1912 Summer Olympics =

Egypt's performance at the 1912 Summer Olympics

- IOC code: EGY
- NOC: Egyptian Olympic Committee

in Stockholm
- Competitors: 1 in 1 sport
- Flag bearer: Ahmed Hassanein
- Medals: Gold 0 Silver 0 Bronze 0 Total 0

Summer Olympics appearances (overview)
- 1912; 1920; 1924; 1928; 1932; 1936; 1948; 1952; 1956; 1960–1964; 1968; 1972; 1976; 1980; 1984; 1988; 1992; 1996; 2000; 2004; 2008; 2012; 2016; 2020; 2024

Other related appearances
- 1906 Intercalated Games –––– United Arab Republic (1960, 1964)

The Egyptian Olympic Committee considers the nation to have first competed in the Summer Olympic Games at the 1912 Summer Olympics in Stockholm, Sweden. According to the official report, the nation sent one fencer, Ahmed Hassanein, who competed in the individual foil and épée events. There is uncertainty, however, as to whether he competed, as the official report lists all entrants in fencing regardless of their actual participation, and no results are known for Hassanein.

== Background ==
In 1912 the Khedivate of Egypt was de jure under the control of the Ottoman Empire, but had been de facto run by the British since 1882. At the 1896 Summer Olympics, an athlete by the name of Dionysios Kasdaglis competed in tennis and won silver medals in the singles and doubles tournaments. Kasdaglis is listed as Greek by the IOC for the singles, but in the doubles he and his Greek partner Demetrios Petrokokkinos are listed as a "mixed team". Kasdaglis had British citizenship, but lived in Egypt and was a member of Egyptian clubs, and thus he has been considered by some as an Egyptian Olympian. Two athletes, Arthur Marson and Eugenio Colombani, competed under the Egyptian flag at the 1906 Intercalated Games, which are no longer recognized as Olympic by the International Olympic Committee (IOC), but were considered as such by contemporary sources. The Egyptian Olympic Committee, founded in 1910, considers Egypt's first Olympic delegation to have been at the 1912 Summer Olympics, which is supported by that year's official report. There is uncertainty, however, as to whether the fencer they sent, Ahmed Hassanein, actually competed, as the official report lists all entrants in the fencing events regardless of their actual participation.

== Fencing ==
According to the official report, Hassanein competed in both the individual foil and épée events. In the former he was part of Pool XIV, which included upcoming bronze medalist Richard Verderber of Austria, and it is recorded only that he did not advance to the quarterfinals. In the latter he was placed in Pool II, which included eventual Olympic champion Paul Anspach of Belgium, and again it is noted only that he did not make it out of the round. Hassanein would go on to compete in both disciplines at the 1920 Summer Olympics, and in épée in 1924, but never won a medal.

Fencer	Event	Round 1		Quarterfinal		Semifinal		Final	
Fencer	Event	Record	Rank	Record	Rank	Record	Rank	Record	Rank
Ahmed Hassanein	Foil	losses		did not advance					
Ahmed Hassanein	Épée	losses		did not advance					
