= Egypt at the 1906 Intercalated Games =

Egypt at the Olympics

- IOC code: EGY

in Athens
- Competitors: 2 in 3 sports
- Medals: Gold 0 Silver 0 Bronze 0 Total 0

Summer appearances
- 1912; 1920; 1924; 1928; 1932; 1936; 1948; 1952; 1956; 1960–1964; 1968; 1972; 1976; 1980; 1984; 1988; 1992; 1996; 2000; 2004; 2008; 2012; 2016; 2020; 2024

Winter appearances
- 1984; 1988–2026

Two athletes, both men, competed under the Egyptian banner at the 1906 Intercalated Games in Athens, Greece, and took part in five events across three sports. Arthur Marson, a track and field athlete, did not place within the top six in the 5 mile and failed to finish the marathon. Eugenio Colombani competed in cycling and Greco-Roman wrestling, but did not reach the finals of either event. Egypt, therefore, did not win any medals at the Games.

== Background ==
The 1906 Intercalated Games are no longer recognized as Olympic by the International Olympic Committee (IOC), but they were considered as such by contemporary sources. In 1906, Egypt was de jure under the control of the Ottoman Empire, but had been de facto run by the British since 1882. At the 1896 Summer Olympics, an athlete by the name of Dionysios Kasdaglis competed in tennis and won silver medals in the singles and doubles tournaments. Kasdaglis is listed as Greek by the IOC for the singles, but in the doubles he and his Greek partner Demetrios Petrokokkinos are listed as a "mixed team". Kasdaglis had British citizenship, but lived in Egypt and was a member of Egyptian clubs, and thus he has been considered by some as an Egyptian Olympian. The Egyptian Olympic Committee, founded in 1910, considers Egypt's first Olympic delegation to have been at the 1912 Summer Olympics, which is supported by that year's official report, but there is uncertainty as to whether the fencer they sent actually competed. Egypt took part in the Olympic Games, with athletes of Egyptian descent, in 1920.

Two athletes, Arthur Marson and Eugenio Colombani, marched under the flag of the Khedivate of Egypt (an Ottoman Olympic Committee would not be formed until 1908), in what was the first full opening ceremony for an event considered Olympic. Marson, competing in track and field athletics, was a member of the Greek Ifitos Kairou club of Cairo. Colombani, of the Egyptian cycling club Soc. Palaestra Boccolini, took part in cycling and Greco-Roman wrestling. Neither athlete won a medal.

== Athletics ==
Marson competed in two events in Athens: the marathon and the 5 mile. In the marathon, which was slightly shorter than the distance of the traditional marathon, he was one of the 38 entrants (out of 53 total) who did not finish the race. His placement in the 5 mile is unknown, but he did not finish in the top six.

Athlete	Events	Final	
Athlete	Events	Result	Rank
Arthur Marson	5 miles	Unknown	Unknown
Arthur Marson	Marathon	did not finish	

== Cycling ==
Colombani took part in two cycling events in Athens: the sprint and the 20 kilometers. In the sprint, he lost in both the opening round and repêchage heats and did not advance to the final. In the 20 kilometers, he completed the opening round successfully, but in a time that did not qualify him for the finals.

Athlete	Events	Heat		Repechage		Final	
Athlete	Events	Result	Rank	Result	Rank	Result	Rank
Eugenio Colombani	Individual sprint	Unknown	Unknown	Unknown	Unknown	did not advance	
Eugenio Colombani	20 Kilometres	Unknown	Unknown	n/a		did not advance	

== Wrestling ==
Colombani competed in the men's lightweight division of Greco-Roman wrestling in Athens. He was eliminated in Round One by Carl Carlsen of Denmark, who would go on to win the silver medal in the event.

Greco-Roman

Athlete	Event	Round 1	Quarterfinals	Semifinals	Final Group		
Athlete	Event	Opposition Result	Opposition Result	Opposition Result	Opposition Result	Opposition Result	Rank
Eugenio Colombani	Lightweight	Carlsen (DEN); L	did not advance				
