= Australia at the 1896 Summer Olympics =

- IOC code: AUS
- NOC: Australian Olympic Committee

in Athens, Greece April 6, 1896 – April 15, 1896
- Competitors: 1 in 2 sports and 6 events
- Medals Ranked 8th: Gold 2 Silver 0 Bronze 0 Total 2

Summer Olympics appearances (overview)
- 1896; 1900; 1904; 1908; 1912; 1920; 1924; 1928; 1932; 1936; 1948; 1952; 1956; 1960; 1964; 1968; 1972; 1976; 1980; 1984; 1988; 1992; 1996; 2000; 2004; 2008; 2012; 2016; 2020; 2024

Other related appearances
- 1906 Intercalated Games –––– Australasia (1908–1912)

Australia competed at the 1896 Summer Olympics in Athens, Greece, from 6 to 15 April 1896. One athlete from the Colony of Victoria, a British colony which later formed part of Australia, competed at the 1896 Summer Olympics in Athens, Greece. Edwin Flack was born in England and was a resident in London in 1896, but spent most of his life in Australia and so is considered an Australian athlete by the International Olympic Committee.

The Union Flag was used as the flag for the Australian colonies as well as Great Britain and Ireland at the 1896 Summer Olympics.

At the end of these Olympics, Australia was ranked in eighth position on the medal table with a total of 2 medals (2 gold).

Flack was the only competitor from an Australian colony. He entered five events, winning medals in three. The bronze medal in tennis, however, was part of a mixed team and therefore is not counted for Australia.

== Medalists ==
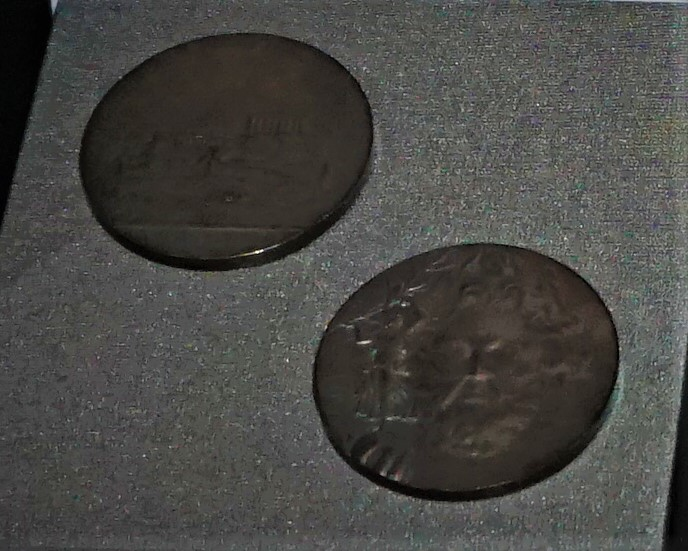
First Australian Olympic medals, exhibited at the Australian Sports Museum

The following competitors won medals at the games. In the discipline sections below, the medalists' names are bolded. Medals awarded to participants of mixed-NOC teams are represented in italics. These medals are not counted towards the individual NOC medal tally.

Medal	Name	Sport	Event	Date
Gold	Edwin Flack	Athletics	Men's 800 metres	April 9
Gold	Edwin Flack	Athletics	Men's 1500 metres	April 7
Bronze	Edwin Flack	Tennis	Men's doubles	April 9

Medals by sport
Sport	1st place, gold medalist(s)	2nd place, silver medalist(s)	3rd place, bronze medalist(s)	Total
Athletics	2	0	0	**2**
Total	2	0	0	2

=== Multiple medalists ===
The following competitors won multiple medals at the 1896 Olympic Games.

Name	Medal	Sport	Event
Edwin Flack	Gold; Gold	Athletics	Men's 800 metres Men's 1500 metres

== Competitors ==
The following is the list of number of competitors in the Games.

Sport	Men	Women	Total
Athletics	1	0	1
Tennis	1	0	1
Total	1	0	1

Medals by day
Day	Date	1st place, gold medalist(s)	2nd place, silver medalist(s)	3rd place, bronze medalist(s)	Total
1	6 April	0	0	0	0
2	7 April	1	0	0	1
3	8 April	0	0	0	0
4	9 April	1	0	0	1
5	10 April	0	0	0	0
6	11 April	0	0	0	0
7	12 April	0	0	0	0
8	13 April	0	0	0	0
Total		2	0	0	2

== Athletics ==
Both of Flack's gold medals came in the athletics competitions as he won both of his track races.

Track & road events

Athlete	Event	Heat		Final	
Athlete	Event	Time	Rank	Time	Rank
Edwin Flack	400 m	DNS		Did not advance	
Edwin Flack	800 m	2:10.0 OR	1 Q	2:11.0	1st place, gold medalist(s)
Edwin Flack	1500 m	—N/a		4:33.2 OR	1st place, gold medalist(s)
Edwin Flack	Marathon	—N/a		DNF	

== Tennis ==
In the singles tournament, Flack lost the only match he competed in. His loss in the semifinals of the doubles competition, while carrying no prize at the time, earned him a retroactive bronze medal from the International Olympic Committee. This medal is counted for mixed team rather than Australia, however.

Athlete	Event	First round	Quarterfinals	Semifinals	Final	
Athlete	Event	Opposition Score	Opposition Score	Opposition Score	Opposition Score	Rank
Edwin Flack	Singles	Akratopoulos (GRE); L	Did not advance			=8
Edwin Flack (AUS); George S. Robertson (GBR)	Doubles	—N/a	Marshall / Marshall (GBR); W WO	Kasdaglis / Petrokokkinos (GRE); L	Did not advance	3rd place, bronze medalist(s)
