= Tennis at the 1896 Summer Olympics =

- Date: 8–11 April 1896
- Edition: 1st
- Surface: Red clay
- Location: Athens Lawn Tennis Club

Champions

Men's singles
- John Boland (GBR)

Men's doubles
- John Boland / Friedrich Traun (ZZX)
- Summer Olympics

At the 1896 Summer Olympics, two tennis events were contested, both for men. They began on 8 April and continued on 9 April, 10 April, and 11 April. 13 or 15 competitors from six nations, including seven Greeks, took part in the tennis competition. Many of the doubles teams were of mixed nationality, including all three medalist pairs. None of the leading players of the time such as Wimbledon champion Harold Mahony, U.S champion Robert Wrenn, William Larned or Wilfred Baddeley participated. To strengthen the field, the organization added sportsmen from other Olympic events, including weightlifter Momčilo Tapavica, hammer thrower George S. Robertson and 800-metres runners Edwin Flack and Friedrich Traun.

== Schedule ==
Date	8 April	9 April	10 April	11 April
Day	Wednesday	Thursday	Friday	Saturday
Men's singles	Round 1	Quarterfinals	Semifinals	Final
Men's doubles	Quarterfinals	Semifinals	—	Final

== Medal summary ==
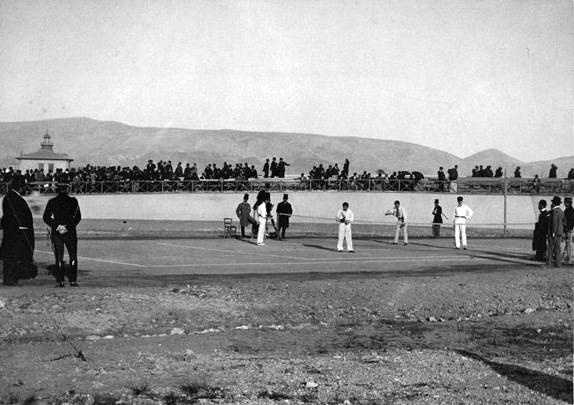
Tennis at the 1896 Summer Olympics

These medals are retroactively assigned by the International Olympic Committee; at the time, winners were given a silver medal and runners-up bronze medals. Athletes coming third received no award.

=== Events ===
Event	Gold	Silver	Bronze
Men's singles	John Boland; Great Britain	Dionysios Kasdaglis; Greece	Konstantinos Paspatis; Greece
Men's singles	John Boland; Great Britain	Dionysios Kasdaglis; Greece	Momčilo Tapavica; Hungary
Men's doubles	Mixed team John Boland (GBR); Friedrich Traun (GER)	Greece; Demetrios Petrokokkinos; Dionysios Kasdaglis	Mixed team Edwin Flack (AUS); George Robertson (GBR)

The silver-medal winning doubles team of Kasdaglis and Petrokokkinos appears in the IOC results database as a Greek team. In this regard:

- Kasdaglis, a Greek national who resided in Alexandria after living in Great Britain for years, is listed as Greek in the IOC database for the singles event, but he is listed as Egyptian or British in some sources.
- Petrokokkinos, who did not win a singles medal, is not identified with any nation in the IOC database, but all sources which state a nationality for Petrokokkinos list him as Greek.

=== Medal table ===
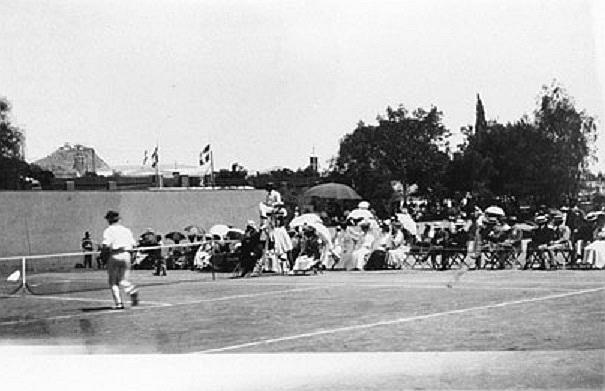
Singles final in 1896 Olympic tennis

Rank	Nation	Gold	Silver	Bronze	Total
1	Mixed team	1	0	1	2
2	Great Britain	1	0	0	1
3	Greece	0	2	1	3
4	Hungary	0	0	1	1
Totals (4 entries)		2	2	3	7

Competitors from Australia and Germany won medals as a part of a mixed team in the doubles event.

== Participating nations ==
A total of 13 tennis players from 6 nations competed at the Athens Games:

- Australia (1)
- France (1)
- Germany (1)
- Great Britain (2)
- Greece (7)
- Hungary (1)

The International Society of Olympic Historians lists only thirteen players; according to them, British players Frank and George Marshall did not participate. Other sources do include the Marshalls, for a total of 15 players.
