= Hungary at the 1896 Summer Olympics =

- IOC code: HUN
- NOC: Hungarian Olympic Committee

in Athens, Greece April 6, 1896 – April 15, 1896
- Competitors: 7 in 6 sports and 16 events
- Medals Ranked 6th: Gold 2 Silver 1 Bronze 3 Total 6

Summer Olympics appearances (overview)
- 1896; 1900; 1904; 1908; 1912; 1920; 1924; 1928; 1932; 1936; 1948; 1952; 1956; 1960; 1964; 1968; 1972; 1976; 1980; 1984; 1988; 1992; 1996; 2000; 2004; 2008; 2012; 2016; 2020; 2024; 2028

Other related appearances
- 1906 Intercalated Games

Hungary competed at the 1896 Summer Olympics in Athens, Greece. Austrian and Hungarian results at early Olympic Games are generally kept separate despite the union of the two nations as Austria-Hungary at the time.

Seven athletes from Hungary competed in six sports. The Hungarian medals came on 18 entries in 15 events.

== Medalists ==
The following Hungarian competitors won medals at the games. In the discipline sections below, the medalists' names are bolded.

Medal	Name	Sport	Event	Date
Gold	Alfréd Hajós	Swimming	Men's 100 metre freestyle	11 April
Gold	Alfréd Hajós	Swimming	Men's 1200 metre freestyle	11 April
Silver	Nándor Dáni	Athletics	Men's 800 metres	9 April
Bronze	Alajos Szokolyi	Athletics	Men's 100 metres	10 April
Bronze	Gyula Kellner	Athletics	Men's marathon	10 April
Bronze	Momcsilló Tapavicza	Tennis	Men's singles	11 April

Medals by sport
**Sport**	1st place, gold medalist(s)	2nd place, silver medalist(s)	3rd place, bronze medalist(s)	**Total**
Swimming	2	0	0	**2**
Athletics	0	1	2	**3**
Tennis	0	0	1	**1**
Total	2	1	3	6

=== Multiple medalists ===
The following competitors won multiple medals at the 1896 Olympic Games.

Name	Medal	Sport	Event
Alfréd Hajós	Gold; Gold	Swimming	Men's 100 m freestyle Men's 1200 m freestyle

== Competitors ==
The following is the list of number of competitors participating in the Games:

Sport	Men	Women	Total
Athletics	3	0	3
Gymnastics	2	0	2
Swimming	1	0	1
Tennis	1	0	1
Weightlifting	1	0	1
Wrestling	1	0	1
Total	7	0	7

Medals by date
Day	Date	1st place, gold medalist(s)	2nd place, silver medalist(s)	3rd place, bronze medalist(s)	Total
Day 1	6 April	0	0	1	1
Day 2	7 April	0	0	0	0
Day 3	8 April	0	0	0	0
Day 4	9 April	0	1	0	1
Day 5	10 April	0	0	1	1
Day 6	11 April	2	0	1	3
Day 7	12 April	0	0	0	0
Day 8	13 April	0	0	0	0
Total		2	1	3	6

== Athletics ==
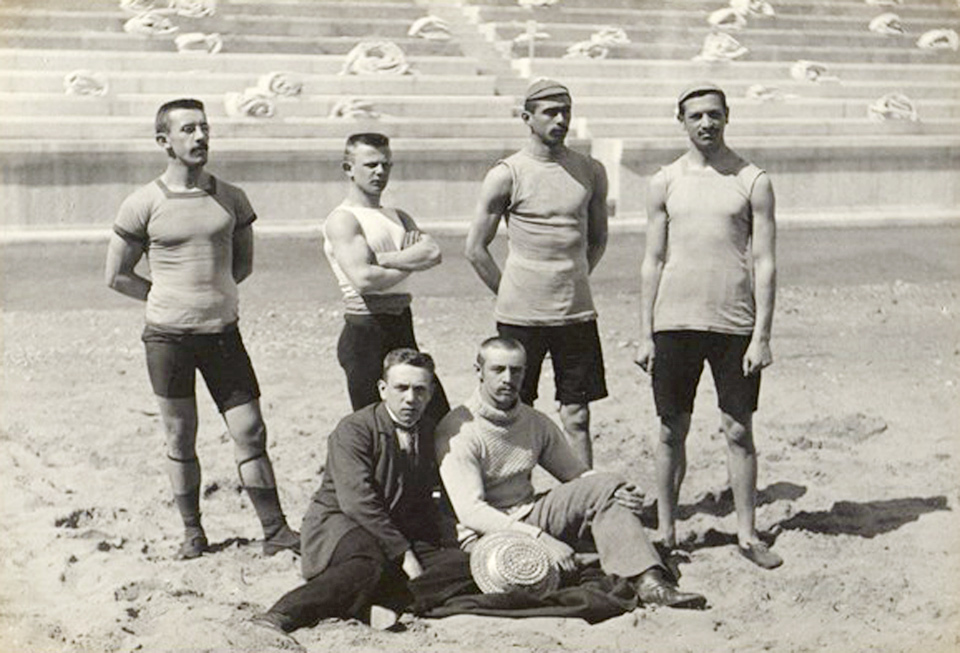
Hungarian athletic team of 1896 Summer Olympics

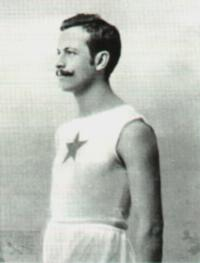
Nándor Dáni

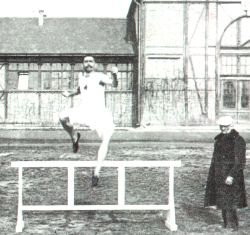
Alajos Szokolyi

The Hungarian athletes were successful in each event except the 110 metre hurdles, taking a silver, two bronzes, and a 4th-place finish. The entry and competitor lists for some events are not agreed on by all sources. In the 100 metres, Dáni, Leonidasz Manno, and István Zachar may have entered and not started (or possibly have competed) along with Szokolyi.

Track & road events

Athlete	Event	Heat		Final	
Athlete	Event	Time	Rank	Time	Rank
Nándor Dáni	100 m	Did not start		Did not advance	
Leonidasz Manno	100 m	Did not start		Did not advance	
István Zachar	100 m	Did not start		Did not advance	
Alajos Szokolyi	100 m	12.8	2 Q	12.6	3rd place, bronze medalist(s)
Nándor Dáni	800 m	2:10.2	2 Q	2:11.8	2nd place, silver medalist(s)
Alajos Szokolyi	110 m hurdles	Unknown	2 Q	Did not start	
Gyula Kellner	Marathon	—N/a		3:06:35	3rd place, bronze medalist(s)

Field events

Athlete	Event	Final	
Athlete	Event	Distance	Position
Alajos Szokolyi	Men's triple jump	11.26	4

== Gymnastics ==
=== Artistic ===
Athlete	Event	Rank
Gyula Kakas	Vault	4–15
Desiderius Wein	Vault	4–15
Gyula Kakas	Pommel horse	3–15
Desiderius Wein	Pommel horse	3–15
Gyula Kakas	Horizontal bar	3–15
Desiderius Wein	Horizontal bar	3–15
Gyula Kakas	Parallel bars	3–18
Desiderius Wein	Parallel bars	3–18
Desiderius Wein	Rings	4, 6–8

== Swimming ==
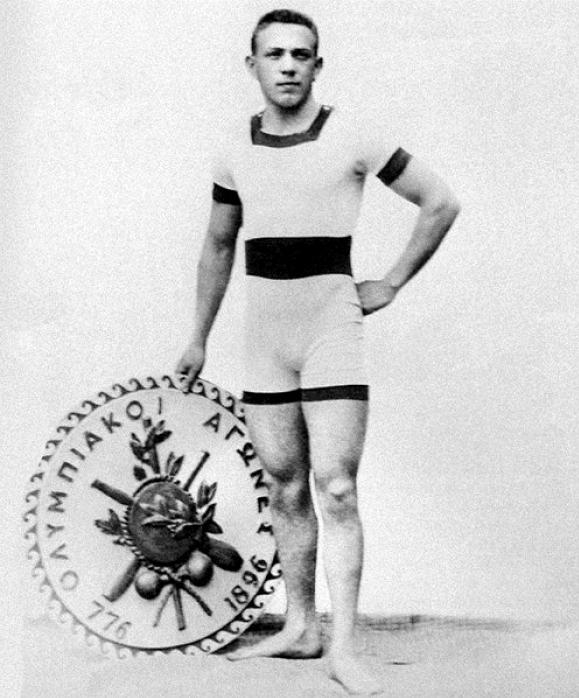
Alfréd Hajós

Hajós won both events he entered, taking two of the four swimming medals (he could not enter the 100 metres for sailors event, and the 500 metres was immediately after the 100 metres and immediately before the 1200 metres).

Athlete	Event	Final	
Athlete	Event	Time	Rank
Alfréd Hajós	100 m freestyle	1:22.2 OR	1st place, gold medalist(s)
Alfréd Hajós	1200 m freestyle	18:22.2	1st place, gold medalist(s)

== Tennis ==
Tapavicza was defeated by Dionysios Kasdaglis in the semifinals of the singles tournament.

Athlete	Event	Round of 16	Quarterfinals	Semifinals	Final	
Athlete	Event	Opposition Score	Opposition Score	Opposition Score	Opposition Score	Rank
Momcsilló Tapavicza	Men's singles	Frangopoulos (GRE); W	Bye	Kasdaglis (GRE); L	Did not advance	3rd place, bronze medalist(s)

== Weightlifting ==
Athlete	Event	Result	Rank
Momcsilló Tapavicza	Men's two hand lift	80.0	6

== Wrestling ==
Athlete	Event	Quarterfinal	Semifinal	Final	
Athlete	Event	Opposition Result	Opposition Result	Opposition Result	Rank
Momcsilló Tapavicza	Men's Greco-Roman	Christopoulos (GRE); L	Did not advance		4
