= Egypt at the 1972 Summer Olympics =

- IOC code: EGY
- NOC: Egyptian Olympic Committee

in Munich
- Competitors: 23 (men) in 5 sports
- Flag bearer: Kamal Kamel Mohammed (Basketball)
- Medals: Gold 0 Silver 0 Bronze 0 Total 0

Summer Olympics appearances (overview)
- 1912; 1920; 1924; 1928; 1932; 1936; 1948; 1952; 1956; 1960–1964; 1968; 1972; 1976; 1980; 1984; 1988; 1992; 1996; 2000; 2004; 2008; 2012; 2016; 2020; 2024

Other related appearances
- 1906 Intercalated Games –––– United Arab Republic (1960, 1964)

Egypt competed at the 1972 Summer Olympics in Munich, West Germany. The North African nation made its Olympic debut in 1912.

The Egyptian contingent included 28 male athletes, 1 female athlete and 18 officials. Because of the Munich massacre, some members of the Egyptians contingent left the Olympics early.

== Results by event ==
=== Swimming ===
Men's 200m Freestyle

- Kamel Aly Mostafa
  - Heat — 2:05.30 (→ did not advance)
