= Tennis at the 1896 Summer Olympics – Men's singles =

Olympic tennis event

Men's singles tennis at the Games of the I Olympiad
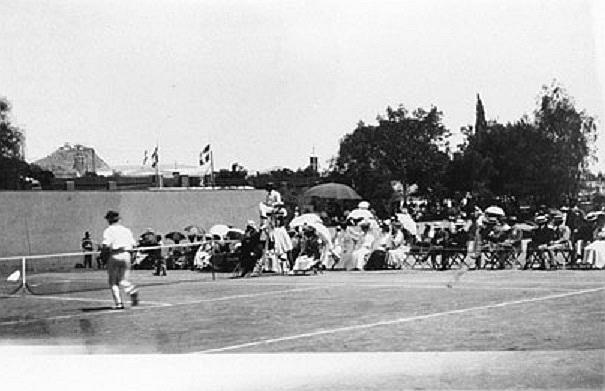
- Singles final in 1896 Olympic tennis
- Venue: Neo Phaliron Velodrome; Athens Lawn Tennis Club
- Dates: April 8, 1896 (first round); April 9, 1896 (quarterfinals); April 10, 1896 (semifinals); April 11, 1896 (final)
- Competitors: 13 from 6 nations

Medalists
1st place, gold medalist(s)		John Pius Boland; Great Britain
2nd place, silver medalist(s)		Dionysios Kasdaglis; Greece
3rd place, bronze medalist(s)		Momčilo Tapavica; Hungary
3rd place, bronze medalist(s)		Konstantinos Paspatis; Greece

Men's singles
- Tennis at the 1896 Summer Olympics

Events
Singles	men
Doubles	men
- Summer Olympics

The men's singles was one of two tennis events on the Tennis at the 1896 Summer Olympics programme. The fifteen entrants were seeded into a single-elimination tournament, with thirteen competing. They represented six nations.

== Background ==
This was the first appearance of the men's singles tennis. The event has been held at every Summer Olympics where tennis has been on the program: from 1896 to 1924 and then from 1988 to the current program. Demonstration events were held in 1968 and 1984.

None of the leading players of the time, such as Wimbledon champion Harold Mahony, U.S champion Robert Wrenn, William Larned or Wilfred Baddeley, participated.

== Competition format ==
Under ancient Greek single-elimination tournament rules, there were no brackets as under modern single-elimination rules; instead, all participants in a round were paired off with one bye if a round had an odd number of participants left. This format could result in a semifinals round with only three competitors, as happened in both the 1896 wrestling and doubles tennis events, which started with five wrestlers/pairs: the first round had two matches, with one wrestler/pair having a bye, and the second round had only one match, with another wrestler/pair having a bye (a modern tournament would have had one match in the first round with three byes, leading to two semifinals).

The organizers avoided this problem in the singles tennis by dividing the players into four groups, with each group playing a single elimination tournament and the winner of each group advancing to the semifinals.

No bronze medal match was held; both semifinal losers are now considered bronze medal winners (the current medal system was not used at the time).

== Schedule ==
Date		Time	Round
Gregorian	Julian	Time	Round
Wednesday, 8 April 1896	Wednesday, 27 March 1896		Round 1
Thursday, 9 April 1896	Thursday, 28 March 1896		Round 1 continued Quarterfinals
Friday, 10 April 1896	Friday, 29 March 1896		Quarterfinals continued Semifinals
Saturday, 11 April 1896	Saturday, 30 March 1896	14:00	Final

== Draw ==
The International Society of Olympic Historians gives only thirteen players. According to them, Frank and George Marshall did not participate.

First round
K Akratopoulos (GRE)
Bye
Dionysios Kasdaglis (GRE)
Rene Defert (FRA)
Momčilo Tapavica (HUN)
Dimitris Frangopoulos (GRE)
George Marshall (GBR)	—	—	—
Frank Marshall (GBR)	—	—	—
Evangelos Rallis (GRE)
Demetrios Petrokokkinos (GRE)
John Boland (GBR)	6	2	6
Friedrich Traun (GER)	0	6	2
Konstantinos Paspatis (GRE)
George Robertson (GBR)
Aristidis Akratopoulos (GRE)
Edwin Flack (AUS)

Quarter-finals
K Akratopoulos (GRE)
D Kasdaglis (GRE)
M Tapavica (HUN)
Bye
E Rallis (GRE)
JP Boland (GBR)
K Paspatis (GRE)
A Akratopoulos (GRE)

Semi-finals
D Kasdaglis (GRE)
M Tapavica (HUN) (bronze)
JP Boland (GBR)
K Paspatis (GRE) (bronze)

Final
D Kasdaglis (GRE) (silver)	3	1
JP Boland (GBR) (gold)	6	6

== Results summary ==
Rank	Player	Nation	Round of 16	Quarterfinals	Semifinals	Final
1st place, gold medalist(s)	John Pius Boland	Great Britain	Traun (GER); W 6–0, 2–6, 6–2	Rallis (GRE); W	Paspatis (GRE); W	Kasdaglis (GRE); W 6–3, 6–1
2nd place, silver medalist(s)	Dionysios Kasdaglis	Greece	Defert (FRA); W	K Akratopoulos (GRE); W	Tapavica (HUN); W	Boland (GBR); L 6–3, 6–1
3rd place, bronze medalist(s)	Konstantinos Paspatis	Greece	Robertson (GBR); W	A Akratopoulos (GRE); W	Boland (GBR); L	Did not advance
3rd place, bronze medalist(s)	Momčilo Tapavica	Hungary	Frangopoulos (GRE); W	G Marshall (GBR); W	Kasdaglis (GRE); L	Did not advance
5	Aristidis Akratopoulos	Greece	Flack (AUS); W	Paspatis (GRE); L	did not advance	
5	Konstantinos Akratopoulos	Greece	Bye	Kasdaglis (GRE); L	did not advance	
5	Evangelos Rallis	Greece	Petrokokkinos (GRE); W	Boland (GBR); L	did not advance	
8	J. Defert	France	Kasdaglis (GRE); L	did not advance		
8	Edwin Flack	Australia	A Akratopoulos (GRE); L	did not advance		
8	Dimitris Frangopoulos	Greece	Tapavica (HUN); L	did not advance		
8	George S. Robertson	Great Britain	Paspatis (GRE); L	did not advance		
8	Friedrich Traun	Germany	Boland (GBR); L 6–0, 2–6, 6–2	did not advance		
8	Demetrios Petrokokkinos	Greece	Rallis (GRE); L	did not advance		
—	Frank Marshall	Great Britain	G Marshall (GBR); L DNS	did not advance		
—	George Marshall	Great Britain	F Marshall (GBR); L DNS	did not advance		
