= Mixed team at the 1896 Summer Olympics =

- IOC code: ZZX
- NOC: Mixed team
- Competitors: 4 in 1 sport
- Medals: Gold 1 Silver 0 Bronze 1 Total 2

Summer Olympics appearances (overview)
- 1896; 1900; 1904

Other related appearances
- 1906 Intercalated Games

Early Olympic Games allowed for individuals in a team to be from different nations. The International Olympic Committee (IOC) now groups their results together under the mixed team designation. Until 2024 IOC used code ZZX and since 2024 code XXB for designating mixed teams. At the 1896 Summer Olympics, two of three of the medalling pairs in the doubles event in tennis were of mixed nationality.

== Medalists ==
Medal	Name	Sport	Event
Gold	John Pius Boland (GBR); Friedrich Traun (GER)	Tennis	doubles
Bronze	Edwin Flack (AUS); George S. Robertson (GBR)	Tennis	doubles
