= Egypt at the 1956 Summer Olympics =

- IOC code: EGY
- NOC: Egyptian Olympic Committee

in Melbourne, Australia/Stockholm, Sweden 10–17 July 1956
- Competitors: 3 in 1 sport
- Medals: Gold 0 Silver 0 Bronze 0 Total 0

Summer Olympics appearances (overview)
- 1912; 1920; 1924; 1928; 1932; 1936; 1948; 1952; 1956; 1960–1964; 1968; 1972; 1976; 1980; 1984; 1988; 1992; 1996; 2000; 2004; 2008; 2012; 2016; 2020; 2024

Other related appearances
- 1906 Intercalated Games –––– United Arab Republic (1960, 1964)

Egypt boycotted the 1956 Summer Olympics in Melbourne, Australia, because of the British and French involvement in the Suez Crisis. The equestrian events for the 1956 Games, however, were held in Stockholm, Sweden, five months earlier, due to Australian quarantine regulations, and three Egyptian riders competed in the show jumping events. None of the athletes won individual medals and they failed to place in the team competition due to one rider's failure to finish the individual tournament.

== Background ==
Prior to 1956, Egypt had sent athletes to six editions of the Summer Olympic Games and the 1906 Intercalated Games. (Note: The 1912 Olympic report lists Egypt as having sent a fencer to those Games, but there is uncertainty as to whether he actually competed.) Egypt, along with Cambodia, Iraq and Lebanon, boycotted the 1956 Games, held in Melbourne, Australia, in protest of Britain and France's involvement in the Suez Crisis, as they supported Israel's invasion of Egypt in an attempt to regain control over the recently nationalized Suez Canal. The equestrian events, however, were held several months earlier than the rest of the Games in Stockholm, Sweden, due to Australian horse quarantine regulations that prevented them from being held in Melbourne. This allowed three Egyptian equestrians to compete at the 1956 Olympics.

== Equestrian ==
=== Show jumping ===
Egypt's three riders, Omar El-Hadary on Auer, Gamal Haress on Nefertiti II, and Mohamed Selim Zaki on Inch'Allah, all competed both individually and as part of the a team in the jumping events. Zaki and Haress were veterans of the 1952 Summer Olympics and would go on to represent the United Arab Republic at the 1960 edition. They finished ninth and joint-21st (with Andrey Favorsky) respectively in the 1956 individual jumping tournament. El-Hadary, in his only Olympic appearance, failed to finish the second round, which also led to Egypt not being placed in the team competition.
