= Gyula Kakas =

Hungarian gymnast (1875–1928)

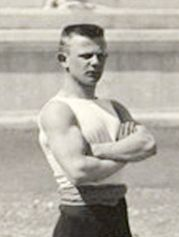
- Kakas in 1896

Personal information
- Alternative name: Gyula Kokas
- Born: 28 March 1875 Budapest, Kingdom of Hungary
- Died: 25 February 1928 (aged 52) Budapest, Kingdom of Hungary

Gymnastics career
- Discipline: Men's artistic gymnastics
- Country represented: Hungary

Gyula Kakas (Note: Also known as Gyula Kokas.) (28 March 1875 – 25 February 1928) was a Hungarian sportsman. From Budapest, he was one of the best gymnasts in his country during his career and also competed in several other sports, setting the unofficial national pole vault record and playing football for the national championship-winning Budapesti TC (BTC) in 1902. Kakas competed in gymnastics at the 1896 Summer Olympics, the 1900 Summer Olympics, and the 1906 Intercalated Games. Kakas was also selected for the 1896 Summer Olympics in athletics, though he did not start in those events. He won many national gymnastics championships and also served as a judge and an official for BTC and Ferencvárosi Vasutasok Sportköre, a club which he founded. After his death at age 52 from a pulmonary hemorrhage, the club he founded organized a competition named after him.

== Biography ==
Kakas was born on 28 March 1875 in Budapest, Kingdom of Hungary. He was a member of the club MTK Budapest, which he joined in 1893, and was a multi-sport athlete growing up: he competed in gymnastics, athletics, cycling, and football, also picking up tennis in later years. He began winning his first tournaments in 1893 in athletics, performing best in the high jump and pole vault.

In 1894, Kakas won the Hódmezővásárhely gymnastics tournament, defeating others including Menotti Réthy, Béla Szöghy and Dávid Müller. The defeat of perennial champion Müller by Kakas, "a small, girlish-faced boy", was considered a surprise. That same year, he won the 1894 Budapest gymnastics championship and the 1894 championships in Szeged and Košice. He won many tournaments in subsequent years; Hungarian Olympic gold medalist Alfréd Hajós said that "his kind, charming manner made him the most popular figure in Hungarian sports life".

Kakas won the 1895 gymnastics championships of Békéscsaba and won one Budapest tournament while placing second in another. He won multiple other Budapest tournaments in 1896 and also unofficially set the national pole vault record with a mark of 2.70, then later 2.80 metres. In 1896, he was sent by Hungary to compete at the 1896 Summer Olympics in Greece, the first time the Olympics were held in modern history. He thus holds the distinction of being the first Olympian for MTK Budapest, a club that has since had over 100 Olympic participants. He was sent despite some criticizing his size as "not representing Hungarian strength"; nevertheless at the Olympics, where he competed in the parallel bars, horizontal bar, vault, and pommel horse individual events, he performed well, according to swimming gold medalist Alfréd Hajós, although he did not win a medal. Kakas was also to compete in the high jump and pole vault events, but was a non-starter in both. Afterwards, he was greeted by Constantine I, the crown prince and future King of Greece.

After the Olympics, Kakas transferred from MTK to Budapesti TC (BTC), leaving the former "almost in mourning". He won the championships of Sombor and Subotica in 1897, of Budapest in 1898, and placed second at the 1899 Bratislava tournament. In 1898, he also became a member of BTC's second football team, where he played for several years. He also went on to make one first-team appearance for the club in 1902, a year they won the national championship. In 1900, he won the Sopron gymnastics tournament and was sent to compete at the 1900 Summer Olympics in Paris, France. He also helped prepare the Hungarian team for the Olympics. He finished in 88th place at the gymnastics event at the 1900 Olympics, but was first in the long jump and received an award from French president Émile Loubet for his performance. Kakas later competed at the 1906 Intercalated Games, finishing 23rd in the individual all-around while helping the Hungarian team place sixth. He also won the 1906 Budapest gymnastics tournament. Five years later, he competed at the 1911 World Artistic Gymnastics Championships in Turin, Italy. During his career, he also won tournaments in other sports including running, jumping, pole vaulting, walking, cycling, badminton and tennis.

Between 1902 and 1905, Kakas was the athletics manager for BTC. He also served as the foreman for BTC and on their executive committee. Following World War I, he was active in the Hungarian Gymnasts Association and served as a gymnastics judge. He worked for many major Hungarian tournaments and according to Magyar Torna, "His judgements were professional, objective, and never offended anyone". In 1919, Kakas founded the Ferencvárosi Vasutasok Sportköre, serving as their president and director until his death. Kakas died on 25 February 1928 in Budapest from a pulmonary hemorrhage, at the age of 52. After his death, the club he founded organized a gymnastics competition named after him, awarding the winners with the Gyula Kokas prize – a "bronze vase in ancient Greek style, with an accompanying stylized wooden stand", designed by two of his friends who were sculptors.
