= D. Frangopoulos =

Greek tennis player

D. Frangopoulos (Greek: Δ. Φραγκόπουλος) was a Greek tennis player. He competed at the 1896 Summer Olympics in Athens.

Frangopoulos was defeated in the first round of the singles tournament by Momcsilló Tapavicza of Hungary. This put him in a six-way tie for eighth place in the field of thirteen players. He did not compete in the doubles tournament.
