= List of Canadian tennis players at the Summer Olympics =

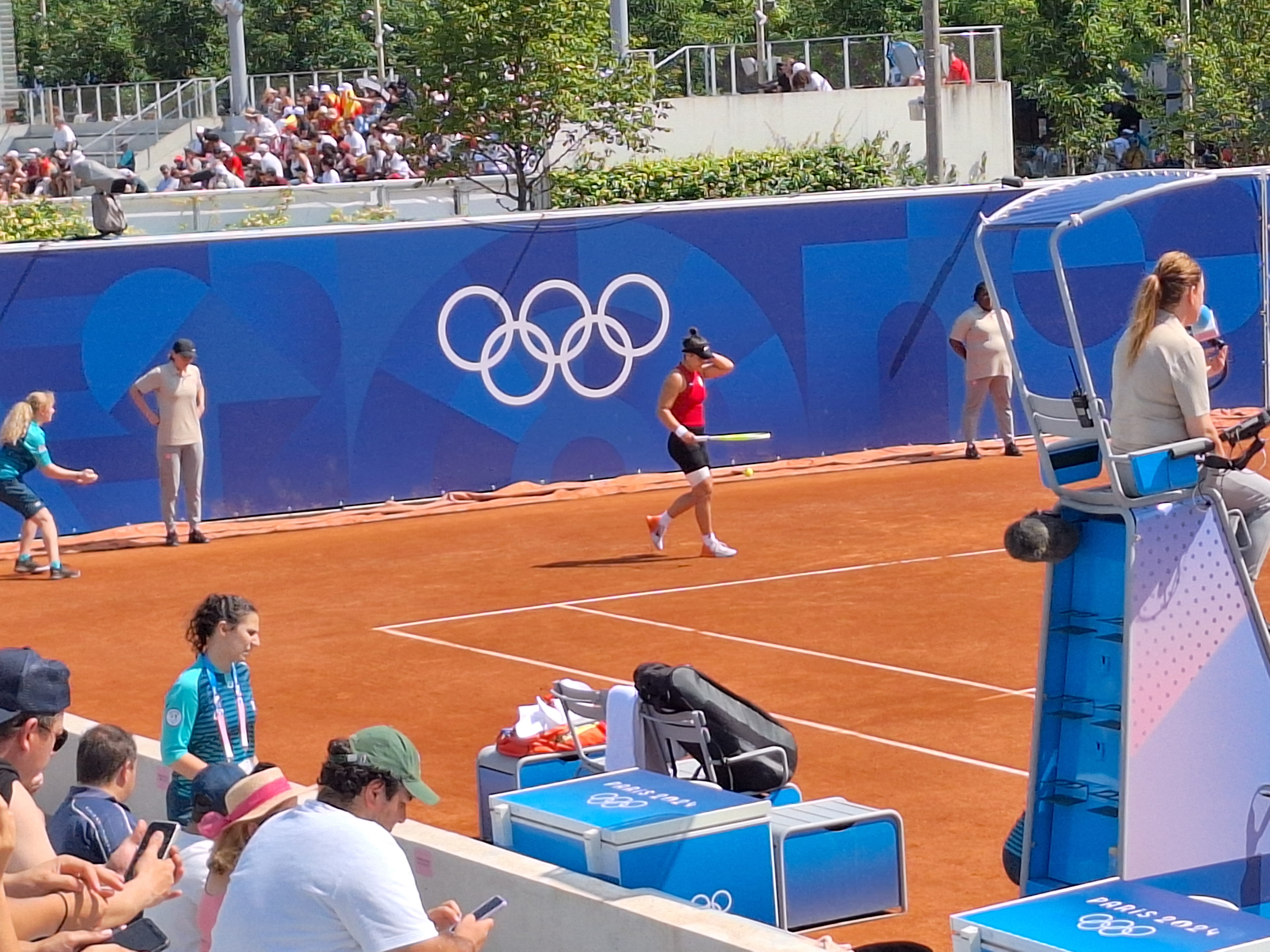
Bianca Andreescu playing at the 2024 Summer Olympics

This is a list of Canadian tennis players who have represented the country at the Summer Olympics, including editions where tennis was contested as a demonstration sport, with the performance of each athlete listed.

== 1984 – Los Angeles (Demonstration Sport) ==
- Women's Singles:
  - Marianne Groat – Lost in the first round.

== 1988 – Seoul ==
- Men's Singles:
  - Andrew Sznajder – Lost in the first round.
- Women's Singles:
  - Helen Kelesi – Lost in the first round.

== 1992 – Barcelona ==
- Men's Singles:
  - Andrew Sznajder – Lost in the first round.
  - Martin Laurendeau – Lost in the first round.
- Men's Doubles:
  - Martin Laurendeau / Sébastien Lareau – Lost in the first round.

== 1996 – Atlanta ==
- Men's Singles:
  - Daniel Nestor – Lost in the first round.
- Men's Doubles:
  - Daniel Nestor / Sébastien Lareau – Lost in the first round.

== 2000 – Sydney ==
- Men's Doubles:
  - Daniel Nestor / Sébastien Lareau – Gold medal.

== 2004 – Athens ==
- Men's Singles:
  - Frédéric Niemeyer – Lost in the first round.
- Men's Doubles:
  - Frédéric Niemeyer / Daniel Nestor – Lost in the first round.

== 2008 – Beijing ==
- Men's Singles:
  - Frank Dancevic – Lost in the first round.
- Men's Doubles:
  - Daniel Nestor / Frédéric Niemeyer – Lost in the second round.

== 2012 – London ==
- Men's Singles:
  - Milos Raonic – Lost in the second round
- Men's Doubles:
  - Daniel Nestor / Vasek Pospisil – Lost in the second round.
- Women's Singles:
  - Aleksandra Wozniak – Lost in the second round.
- Women's Doubles:
  - Stéphanie Dubois / Aleksandra Wozniak – Lost in the first round.

== 2016 – Rio de Janeiro ==
- Men's Singles:
  - Vasek Pospisil – Lost in the first round.
- Men's Doubles:
  - Daniel Nestor / Vasek Pospisil – 4th place.
- Women's Singles:
  - Eugenie Bouchard – Lost in the second round.
- Women's Doubles:
  - Gabriela Dabrowski / Eugenie Bouchard – Lost in the second round.
- Mixed Doubles:
  - Gabriela Dabrowski / Daniel Nestor – Lost in the first round.

== 2020 – Tokyo ==
- Men's Singles:
  - Félix Auger-Aliassime – Lost in the first round.
- Women's Singles:
  - Leylah Fernandez – Lost in the second round.
- Women's Doubles:
  - Gabriela Dabrowski / Sharon Fichman – Lost in the first round.
- Mixed Doubles
  - Gabriela Dabrowski / Félix Auger-Aliassime – Lost in the first round.

== 2024 – Paris ==
- Men's Singles:
  - Félix Auger-Aliassime – 4th place.
  - Milos Raonic – Lost in the first round.
- Men's Doubles:
  - Félix Auger-Aliassime / Milos Raonic – Lost in the second round.
- Women's Singles:
  - Leylah Fernandez – Round of 16.
  - Bianca Andreescu – Second round.
- Women's Doubles:
  - Gabriela Dabrowski / Leylah Fernandez – Quarterfinals.
- Mixed Doubles:
  - Gabriela Dabrowski / Félix Auger-Aliassime – Bronze medal.
