= Machonet =

British sports shooter

Machonet was a British sport shooter. He competed at the 1896 Summer Olympics in Athens (Men's Military Rifle, 200 meters). Machonet, a last name possibly mis-transliterated from the Greek and whose first name is unknown, competed in the military rifle event. His place and score in the event are unknown, but he was not among the top 13 in the 42-man competition.
