= Konstantinos Akratopoulos =

Greek tennis player

- Κωνσταντίνος Ακρατόπουλος
- Relatives: Aristidis Akratopoulos (brother)
- Tennis career
- Country (sports): Greece

Other tournaments
- Olympic Games: 5th (1896)

Other doubles tournaments
- Olympic Games: 4th (1896)

Konstantinos Akratopoulos (Greek: Κωνσταντίνος Ακρατόπουλος) was a Greek tennis player. He competed at the 1896 Summer Olympics in Athens.

Akratopoulos had a bye in the first round of the singles tournament. He met Dionysios Kasdaglis of Greece in the second round, losing to the eventual silver medallist. Akratopoulos finished in a three-way tie for fifth place.

In the doubles tournament, Akratopoulos partnered with his brother Aristidis. The pair was defeated in the first round by eventual gold medallists Friedrich Traun of Germany and John Pius Boland of Great Britain and Ireland. They finished in a two-way tie for fourth place among the five pairs.
