= Kamal Kenawi Ali Moustafa =

Egyptian swimmer

Personal information
- Born: 6 June 1956 (age 70)

Sport
- Sport: Swimming

Kamal Kenawi Ali Moustafa (born 6 June 1956) is an Egyptian former swimmer. He competed in three events at the 1972 Summer Olympics.
