= Evangelos Rallis =

Greek tennis player

Evangelos Rallis (Greek: Ευάγγελος Ράλλης) was a Greek tennis player. He competed at the 1896 Summer Olympics in Athens.

Rallis defeated fellow Greek Demetrios Petrokokkinos in the first round of the singles tournament. In the second round, though, he faced John Pius Boland of Great Britain and Ireland. He lost to the eventual gold medallist.

In the doubles tournament, Petrokokkinos got his revenge. Rallis, paired with Konstantinos Paspatis, was defeated by the Greek/Egyptian pairing of Petrokokkinos and Dionysios Kasdaglis. Rallis and Paspatis finished in a two-way tie for fourth among the five pairs.
