= Aristidis Akratopoulos =

Greek tennis player

- Αριστείδης Ακρατόπουλος
- Relatives: Konstantinos Akratopoulos (brother)
- Tennis career
- Country (sports): Greece

Other tournaments
- Olympic Games: 5th (1896)

Other doubles tournaments
- Olympic Games: 4th (1896)

Aristidis Akratopoulos (Greek: Αριστείδης Ακρατόπουλος) was a Greek tennis player. He competed at the 1896 Summer Olympics in Athens.

== Career ==
Akratopoulos won his first-round match in the singles tournament, defeating Edwin Flack of Australia. He met fellow Greek Konstantinos Paspatis in the second round, however, and Paspatis beat him. Akratopoulos finished in a three-way tie for fifth place.

In the doubles tournament, Akratopoulos partnered with his brother Konstantinos. The pair was defeated in the first round by eventual gold medallists Friedrich Traun of Germany and John Pius Boland of Great Britain and Ireland. They finished in a two-way tie for fourth place among the five pairs.
