= Konstantinos Paspatis =

Greek tennis player (1878–1903)

Personal information
- Native name: Κωνσταντίνος Πασπάτης
- Nationality: Greek
- Born: Constantine George Paspatis; 5 June 1878 Liverpool, England
- Died: 1 July 1903 (aged 25) Athens, Greece
Medal record
Men's tennis
Representing Greece
Olympic Games
Bronze medal – third place	1896 Athens	Singles

Konstantinos Paspatis (Greek: Κωνσταντίνος Πασπάτης, 5 June 1878 – 1 July 1903, registered at birth in England as Constantine George Paspatis) was a Greek tennis player. He competed at the 1896 Summer Olympics in Athens. He was born in Liverpool, England and died in Athens.

Paspatis won a bronze medal in the singles tournament. In the first round, he defeated George S. Robertson of Great Britain and Ireland. His second round opponent was fellow Greek Aristidis Akratopoulos, whom Paspatis defeated as well. He met eventual gold medallist John Pius Boland in the semifinals, however, and was defeated. Since there was no playoff for third place, Paspatis and Momcsilló Tapavicza of Hungary are considered to share third. In the doubles tournament, Paspatis and partner Evangelos Rallis (also of Greece) were defeated in the first round by Dionysios Kasdaglis and Demetrios Petrokokkinos, also Greeks (the former from Egypt). This put the pair in two-way tie for fourth place of the five pairs.
