= Momčilo Tapavica =

Hungarian sportsman and architect

Momčilo Tapavica Momcsilló Tapavicza
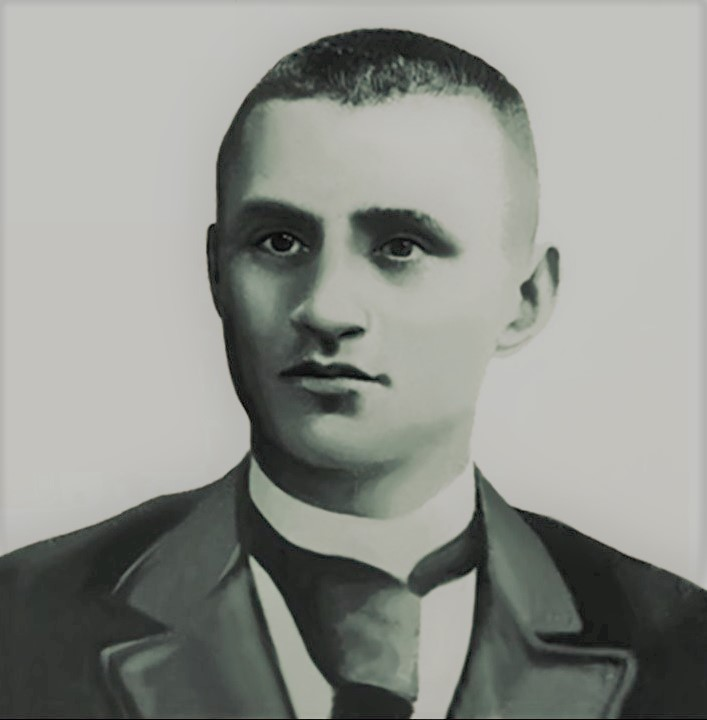

Personal information
- Born: 14 October 1872 Nádalja, Kingdom of Hungary, Austria-Hungary
- Died: 10 January 1949 (aged 76) Pula, PR Croatia, FPR Yugoslavia

Sport
- Country: Hungary
- Sport: Tennis, weightlifting, wrestling
Medal record
Men's Tennis
Representing Hungary
Olympic Games
Bronze medal – third place	1896 Athens	Singles
- Updated on 1 October 2013

Momčilo Tapavica (Serbian Cyrillic: Момчило Тапавица; Hungarian: Tapavicza Momcsilló [ˈtɒpɒvit͡sɒ ˈmomt͡ʃilloː]; 14 October 1872 – 10 January 1949) was an all-around sportsperson and architect. He competed in tennis, weightlifting, wrestling. Tapavica achieved his best result in tennis by winning the singles bronze medal at the 1896 Summer Olympics, making him the first ethnic Serb, Slav and Hungarian citizen to win an Olympic medal. After his sporting career Tapavica became a well-known architect.

== Sports career ==
Tapavica, an ethnic Serb, was born in Nádalja, Kingdom of Hungary (now Nadalj, Serbia) in 1872. He began to practise sports in Újvidék (Novi Sad), continuing his training in Budapest, where he studied architecture and civil engineering at the Technical College. His performances excelled and he was selected in the Hungarian team for the first Olympic Games in Athens in 1896, where he competed in tennis, weightlifting and wrestling.

At the 1896 Summer Olympics, Tapavica, being the lone tennis player in Hungary's Olympic Team, won the bronze medal in the singles tennis tournament.

In the first round, he defeated D. Frangopoulos of Greece. The second round gave him a bye, subsequently Dionysios Kasdaglis of Egypt beat Tapavica in the semifinal, and with no playoff for third place he shared bronze medal honors with Greek Konstantinos Paspatis. Tapavica was the first ethnic Serb to win an Olympic medal, as well as the first – and to date the only – Hungarian to win a medal in tennis at the Olympic Games. He did not compete in the doubles tournament.

In weightlifting, Tapavica overextended himself, which caused him a shoulder injury and eventually finished last of the six competitors in the two-handed weightlifting, now known as the clean and jerk. Two days later, still unhealed, Tapavica was defeated in the first round of the wrestling competition by Stephanos Christopoulos. The two were nearly evenly matched, but Tapavica tired first and conceded.

After the Olympic Games, Tapavica never again participated in competitive events, however he continued to do recreational sports, such as athletics, gymnastics and rowing. For many years he was a member of the Újvidék-based rowing club Danubius.

== Architect ==
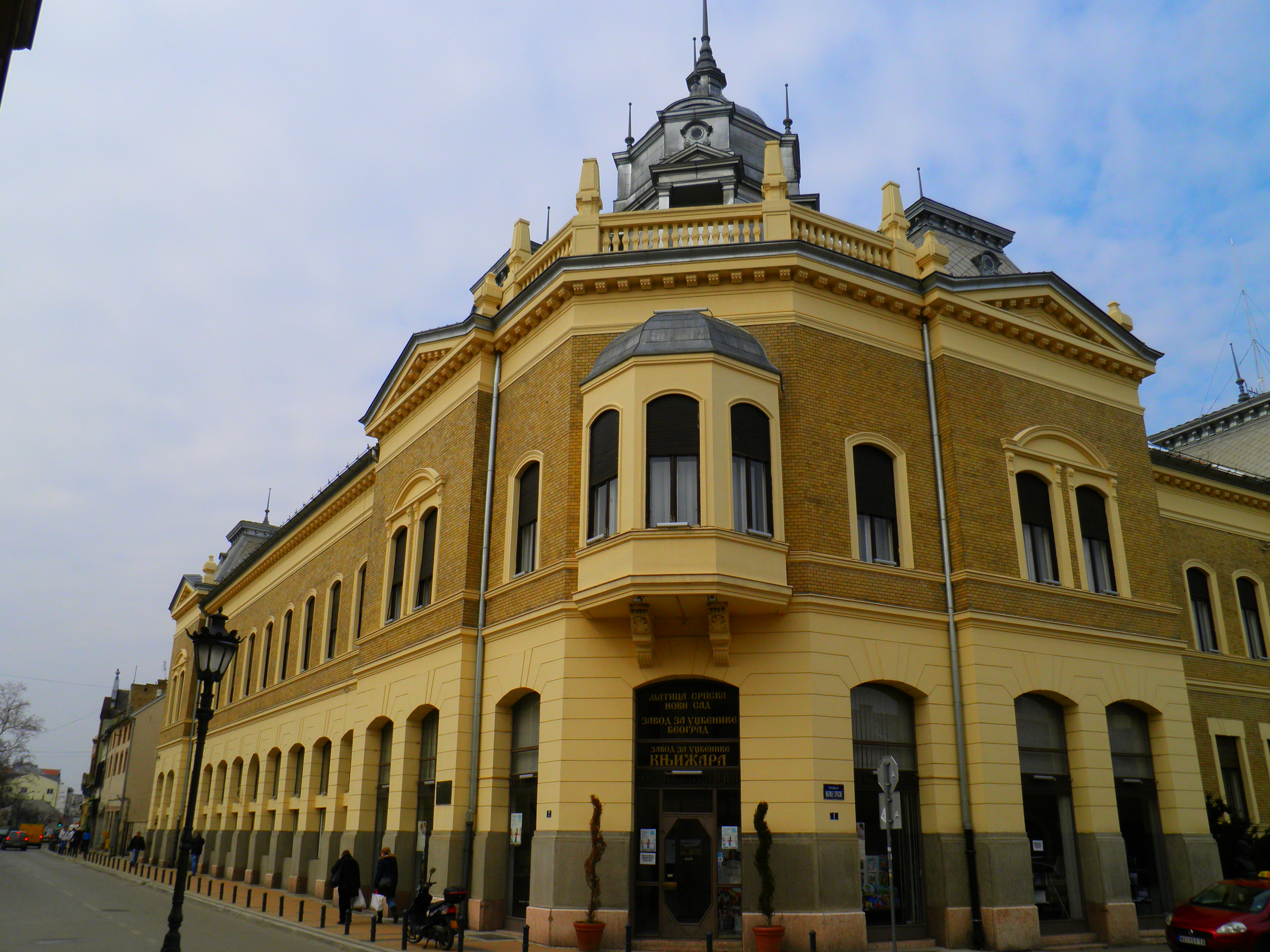
Matica srpska building in Novi Sad

After his graduation, Tapavica remained in Budapest for a shorter period before returning to Újvidék. In 1908, for the invitation of Nicholas I of Montenegro, Tapavica went to Montenegro, where he designed several buildings. Among his notable works from this period are the German Embassy and National Bank in Cetinje, and the building of Boka Hotel in Herceg Novi, which was destroyed by an earthquake in 1979. The building of an orphanage funded by Marija Trandafil's will was built in Novi Sad based on the plans of Tapavica, was finished in 1912. The building would later become the Matica srpska.

Upon the outbreak of World War I, Tapavica first emigrated to Austria-Hungary, and later through Rome and Lausanne he ended up in Morocco. While in Morocco, he joined the French Foreign Legion and became friends with Spain's future dictator Francisco Franco.

After the war he returned to Novi Sad, where he ran his own architectural design company and actively participated in discussions about the urban planning of the city. Following World War II, in 1948, he moved to Poreč, where he significantly contributed to the rebuilding of the war-torn city. He died in 1949 in Pula.

== Legacy ==
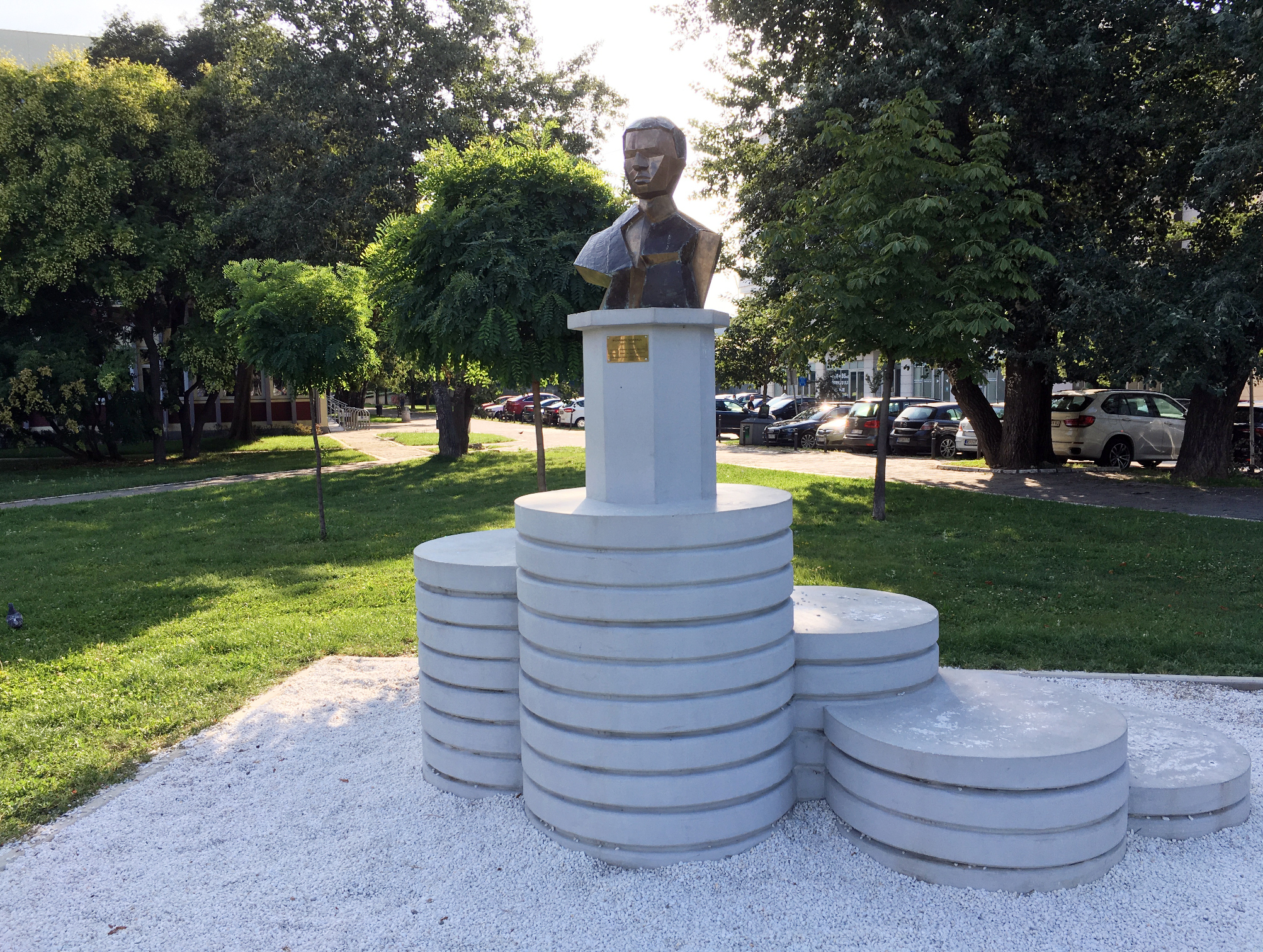
Monument dedicated to Momčilo Tapavica in Novi Sad

His life is the subject of a 2016 documentary Tapavica directed by Milan Todorović.

A street was named after him and a bust is bestowed in his honor in Novi Sad.

== See also ==
- List of Serbian architects
