= Tennis at the 1896 Summer Olympics – Men's doubles =

Tennis tournament

Men's doubles tennis at the Games of the I Olympiad
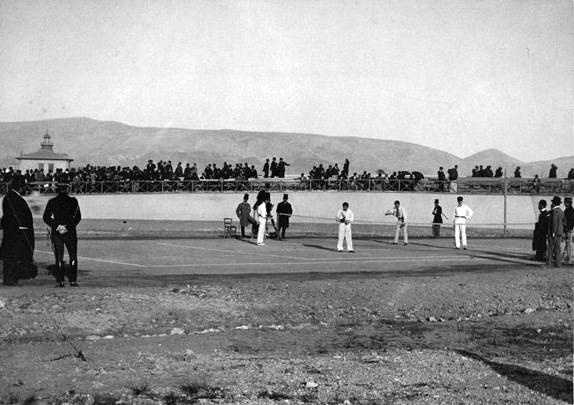
- Doubles final in 1896 Olympic tennis
- Venue: Neo Phaliron Velodrome; Athens Lawn Tennis Club
- Dates: April 8, 1896 (quarterfinals); April 9, 1896 (semifinals); April 11, 1896 (final)
- Competitors: 5 teams (10 players) from 4 nations

Medalists
1st place, gold medalist(s)		Mixed team: John Boland; Friedrich Traun
2nd place, silver medalist(s)		Greece: Dionysios Kasdaglis; Demetrios Petrokokkinos
3rd place, bronze medalist(s)		Mixed team: Edwin Flack; George S. Robertson

Men's doubles
- Tennis at the 1896 Summer Olympics

Events
Singles	men
Doubles	men
Summer Olympics	· 1900 →

The men's doubles was one of two tennis events on the tennis at the 1896 Summer Olympics programme. The six pairs that entered were seeded into a single elimination tournament. Only five actually competed, hailing from four nations but entering as three Greek teams and a pair of mixed teams. It was the only event in the 1896 Summer Olympics that had mixed teams (the other two non-individual events, in gymnastics, featured only non-mixed teams).

The doubles team of Kasdaglis and Petrokokkinos appears in the IOC results database as a Greek team.

Kasdaglis is listed as Greek in the database for the singles event: however, as he was a Greek national residing in Alexandria after years in Great Britain, he is listed as Egyptian or as British in some sources.

Petrokokkinos, who did not win a singles medal, is not identified with any nation in the IOC database; however, all sources which give a nationality for Petrokokkinos list him as Greek.

== Background ==
This was the first appearance of the men's doubles tennis. The event has been held at every Summer Olympics where tennis has been on the program: from 1896 to 1924 and then from 1988 to the current program. A demonstration event was held in 1968.

None of the leading players of the time, such as Wimbledon champion Harold Mahony, U.S champion Robert Wrenn, William Larned or Wilfred Baddeley, participated.

== Competition format ==
Under ancient Greek single-elimination tournament rules, there were no brackets as under modern single-elimination rules; instead, all participants in a round were paired off with one bye if a round had an odd number of participants left. This format could result in a semifinals round with only 3 competitors (as happened in both the 1896 wrestling and doubles tennis events, which started with 5 wrestlers/pairs: the first round had two matches, with one wrestler/pair having a bye, and the second round had only one match, with another wrestler/pair having a bye; a modern tournament would have had one match in the first round with three byes, leading to two semifinals). The organizers avoided this problem in the singles tennis by dividing the players into four groups, with each group playing a single elimination tournament and the winner of each group advancing to the semifinals.

== Schedule ==
The competition took place over 4 days, with one day of rest before the final.

Date		Time	Round
Gregorian	Julian	Time	Round
Wednesday, 8 April 1896	Wednesday, 27 March 1896		Quarterfinals
Thursday, 9 April 1896	Thursday, 28 March 1896	9:00	Quarterfinals, continued Semifinal
Saturday, 11 April 1896	Saturday, 30 March 1896	14:00	Final

== Draw ==
=== Key ===
- Q = Qualifier
- WC = Wild card
- LL = Lucky loser
- Alt = Alternate
- ITF = ITF entry
- PR = Protected ranking
- SR = Special ranking
- SE = Special exempt
- JE = Junior exempt
- JR = Junior Accelerator Programme entrant
- CO = College Accelerator Programme entrant
- NG = Next Gen Accelerator Program entrant
- w/o = Walkover
- r = Retired
- d = Defaulted

=== Draw ===
The International Society of Olympic Historians gives only five teams; according to them Frank and George Marshall did not participate. The score of the final is not certain; Le Velo is the only 1896 source to give a score and provides 5–7, 6–4, 6–1. Boland's journal has 5–7, 6–3, 6–3.

Quarterfinals
Aristidis Akratopoulos (GRE); Konstantinos Akratopoulos (GRE)
John Boland (GBR); Friedrich Traun (GER)
Edwin Flack (AUS); George Robertson (GBR)
Frank Marshall (GBR); George Marshall (GBR)	w/o
Dionysios Kasdaglis (GRE); Demetrios Petrokokkinos (GRE)
Konstantinos Paspatis (GRE); Evangelos Rallis (GRE)

Semifinals
John Boland (GBR); Friedrich Traun (GER)
Bye
Edwin Flack (AUS); George S. Robertson (GBR)
Dionysios Kasdaglis (GRE); Demetrios Petrokokkinos (GRE)

Final (gold-medal match)
John Boland (GBR); Friedrich Traun (GER)	5	6	6
Dionysios Kasdaglis (GRE); Demetrios Petrokokkinos (GRE)	7	4	1

== Results summary ==
Rank	Players	Nation	Quarterfinals	Semifinals	Final
1st place, gold medalist(s)	John Boland; Friedrich Traun	Mixed team	A Akratopoulos (GRE); K Akratopoulos (GRE); W	Bye	D Kasdaglis (GRE); D Petrokokkinos (GRE); W 5–7, 6–4, 6–1
2nd place, silver medalist(s)	Dionysios Kasdaglis; Demetrios Petrokokkinos	Greece	K Paspatis (GRE); E Rallis (GRE); W	E Flack (AUS); G Robertson (GBR); W	J Boland (GBR); F Traun (GER); L 5–7, 6–4, 6–1
3rd place, bronze medalist(s)	Edwin Flack; George S. Robertson	Mixed team	F Marshall (GBR); G Marshall (GBR); W w/o	D Kasdaglis (GRE); D Petrokokkinos (GRE); L	Bye
4	Aristidis Akratopoulos; Konstantinos Akratopoulos	Greece	J Boland (GBR); F Traun (GER); L	did not advance	
4	Konstantinos Paspatis; Evangelos Rallis	Greece	D Kasdaglis (GRE); D Petrokokkinos (GRE); L	did not advance	
—	Frank Marshall; George Marshall	Great Britain	E Flack (AUS); G Robertson (GBR); L w/o	did not advance	
