= John Boland (Irish nationalist politician) =

Irish politician (1870–1958)

John Pius Boland KSG
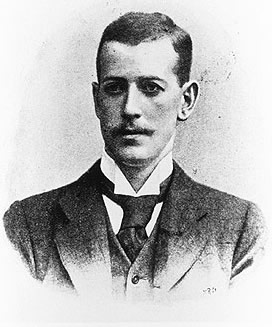

Member of Parliament for South Kerry
- In office October 1900 – December 1918
- Preceded by: Thomas Joseph Farrell
- Succeeded by: Fionán Lynch

Personal details
- Born: 16 September 1870 Dublin, Ireland
- Died: 17 March 1958 (aged 87) London, England
- Party: Irish Parliamentary Party
- Spouse: Eileen Moloney (1876–1937)
- Children: 1 son, 5 daughters, including Honor and Bridget
- Education: Christ Church, Oxford; University of London; University of Bonn
- Occupation: Politician and Tennis Player

John Boland
Medal record

Olympic Games

Men's tennis

Representing Great Britain
Gold medal – first place	1896 Athens	Singles

Representing a Mixed team
Gold medal – first place	1896 Athens	Doubles

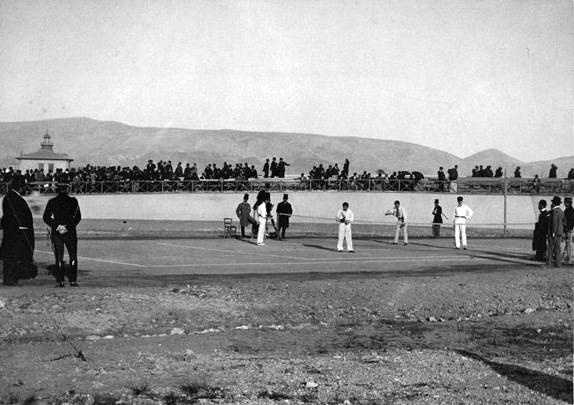
Boland (right) at the 1896 Olympics tennis men's doubles final

John Mary Pius Boland (16 September 1870 – 17 March 1958) was an Irish Nationalist politician and Member of Parliament (MP) in the House of Commons of the United Kingdom of Great Britain and Ireland and a member of the Irish Parliamentary Party for South Kerry from 1900 to 1918. He was also noteworthy as a gold medallist tennis player at the first modern Olympics.

== Early life ==
Boland was born at 135 Capel Street, Dublin, to Patrick Boland (1840–1877), a businessman, and Mary Donnelly. Following the death of his mother in 1882, he was placed with his six siblings under the guardianship of his uncle Nicholas Donnelly, auxiliary bishop of Dublin.

Boland was educated at two private Catholic schools, one Irish, the second English, and both of whose existence and evolution were influenced by John Henry (later Cardinal) Newman – the Catholic University School, Dublin, and The Oratory School, Birmingham (since relocated to near Reading) where he became head boy. His secondary education in the two schools on either side of the Irish Sea helped give him the foundation and understanding to play an influential role in the politics of Great Britain and Ireland at the beginning of the 20th century, when he was a member of the Irish Parliamentary Party, which pursued constitutional Home Rule.

In 1892 he graduated with a BA from London University. He had studied for a semester in Bonn, Germany, where he was a member of Bavaria Bonn, a student fraternity that is a member of the Cartellverband. Boland studied law at Christ Church, Oxford, graduating with a BA in 1896 and an MA in 1901; although called to the Bar in 1897, he never practised.

== Success at the first Olympics ==
He was the first Olympic champion in tennis for Great Britain and Ireland at the first modern Olympics, which took place in Athens in 1896.

Boland visited his friend Thrasyvoulos Manos in Athens during the Olympics, and Manos, a member of the organising committee, entered Boland in the tennis tournament. Boland promptly won the singles tournament, defeating Friedrich Traun of Germany in the first round, Evangelos Rallis of Greece in the second, Konstantinos Paspatis of Greece in the semifinals, and Dionysios Kasdaglis of Greece in the final.

Boland then entered the doubles event with Traun, the German runner-up whom he had defeated in the first round of the singles. Together, they won the doubles event. They defeated Aristidis and Konstantinos Akratopoulos of Greece in the first round, had a bye in the semifinals, and defeated Demetrios Petrokokkinos of Greece and D. Kasdaglis in the final. When the Union Flag and the German flag were run up the flagpole to honour Boland and Traun's victory, Boland pointed out to the man hoisting the flags that he was Irish, adding, "It [the Irish flag]'s a gold harp on a green ground, we hope". The officials agreed to have an Irish flag prepared.

== Career ==
Following a visit to Kerry, he became concerned about the lack of literacy among the native population; he also had a keen interest in the Irish language.

His patriotic stand was well received in nationalist circles in Ireland. This and a lifelong friendship with John Redmond gained him an invitation to stand as a candidate for the Irish Parliamentary Party in the safe seat of South Kerry, which he held from 1900 to 1918. He was unopposed in the general elections of 1900 and 1906, and the first of 1910; in the second election of 1910 he was challenged by a local man, T. B. Cronin, who stood as an independent nationalist in the interest of William O'Brien. Boland stood down at the 1918 general election.

In 1908, Boland was appointed a member of the commission for the foundation of the National University of Ireland.

From 1926 to 1947, he was general secretary of the Catholic Truth Society.

He received a papal knighthood, becoming a Knight of St. Gregory in recognition of his work in Education, and in 1950 he was awarded an honorary doctorate of Laws by the NUI.

== Personal life ==
He married Eileen Moloney (1876–1937) at SS Peter and Edward, Palace Street, Westminster, on 22 October 1902, the daughter of Patrick Moloney.

They had one son and five daughters; his daughter Honor Crowley succeeded her husband Frederick Crowley upon his death, sitting as a Fianna Fáil TD for South Kerry from 1945 until 1966, when she died. His daughter Bridget Boland was a playwright who notably wrote The Prisoner and co-wrote the script for Gaslight, and, among other books, co-authored Old Wives' Lore for Gardeners with her sister, Maureen Boland.

== Death ==
He died at his home in London on St. Patrick's Day, 1958.

Parliament of the United Kingdom
Preceded by Thomas Joseph Farrell	Member of Parliament for South Kerry; 1900–1918	Succeeded by Fionán Lynch
