= Edwin Flack =

Australian athlete and tennis player (1873-1935)

Personal information
- Full name: Edwin Harold Flack
- Nickname: Teddy
- Nationality: Australian
- Born: 5 November 1873 Islington, London, England
- Died: 10 January 1935 (aged 61) Melbourne, Victoria, Australia

Sport
- Sport: Athletics; tennis
Medal record
Olympic Games
Men's athletics
Representing Australia
Gold medal – first place	1896 Athens	800 metres
Gold medal – first place	1896 Athens	1500 metres
Men's tennis
Representing a Mixed team
Bronze medal – third place	1896 Athens	Doubles

Edwin Harold Flack (5 November 1873 – 10 January 1935) was an Australian athlete and tennis player. Also known as "Teddy", he was Australia's first Olympian, being its only representative in 1896, and the first Olympic champion in the 800 metres and the 1500 metres running events.

Following Flack's Olympic appearance, he did not compete in any major events again, opting to breed cattle and help his family's accounting firm. Flack died aged 61 following an operation, and was buried in his hometown of Berwick. He is commemorated with a bronze statue of him on High Street and a reserve bearing his name including several sporting grounds honoring his legacy and contributions to sports. Flack was also inducted into the Sport Australia and Athletics Australia halls of fame in 1985 and 2000, respectively.

== Early life ==
Born in London, England, Edwin Flack was 10 months old when his family migrated to Australia, to live in Berwick, Victoria. Soon after leaving the Melbourne Church of England Grammar School in 1892, where he studied Greek history, Flack joined his father's accountancy firm, Davey, Flack & Co. From 1892 to 1894, Flack was active in middle and long-distance running in amateur athletics in the then colony of Victoria, competing with the Melburnian Hare & Hounds athletics club. In October 1892 he placed third in the inaugural Victorian 10-mile cross country championship, held at Oakleigh (Park) Racecourse, in a time of 1:02.42.0.

On 9 to 11 November 1893, an intercolonial meet described as the Australasian Athletics Championships was held at the Melbourne Cricket Ground, between athletes from the British colonies that were later to form the nations of Australia and New Zealand. This was the second such meet, the first having been held at Moore Park in Sydney on 31 May 1890. Flack competed in the 1893 event and won the mile championship in a time of 4:44.0, with a winning margin of two yards. He also competed in the 880 yards (won by Ken McCrae of New South Wales in 2:06.8) and three miles championship (won by Charles Herbert of Victoria in 15:33.6), but was unplaced in both events. By virtue of his win in the mile event he was also awarded the Victorian 1893 mile championship title and, on 30 September 1893, was third in the Victorian 10 mile cross country championship in a time of 1:05.21.

On 15 December 1894, Flack won both the 880 yards (2:07.2) and mile (4:49.4) Victorian 1894 championships and, earlier in the year, on 22 September 1894 was second in the 10-mile cross country championship (1:00.02). The 1894 event was Flack's last appearance in the Victorian Championships. The same year, Flack was sent to London to receive further training as an accountant with the firm Price, Waterhouse & Co (now PricewaterhouseCoopers). Flack joined the London Athletic Club and was intent on attending the coming inaugural Olympics. Flack attended the Olympics as a member of the London Athletic Club, but competed in his Melburnian Hare and Hounds colours.

== 1896 Olympics ==
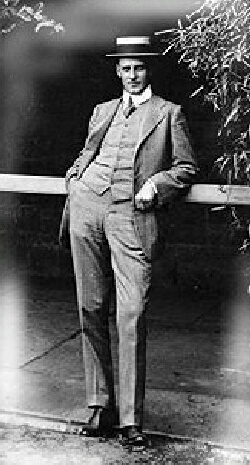
Edwin Flack in Athens in 1896

Flack reached Athens after an uncomfortable six-day rail and sea trip, during which he was plagued with sea sickness. On the opening day of the Games he won his first race, the first heat of the 800 metres run, finishing in a time of 2 min 10.0 sec. On the second day he lined up against the American favourite, Arthur Blake, in the 1500 metres run. Running shoulder to shoulder with Blake in the final straight, Flack powered ahead near the end to win by more than five metres in a time of 4:33.2. On the fourth day of the Games, Flack earned his second gold medal, winning the 800 metres in 2 min 11.9 sec.

It may be noted that, even by the standards of the time, the times required to win the 800 m and 1,500 m at the first Olympics were slow. Although there was no official world record in that era, by way of comparison, the local 880 yards championship in Flack's home colony of Victoria was won that year in 2:04.4 and the previous year (1895) in 2:03.4. At the Australasian Championships of 1896, the mile run was won by New Zealander W. Bennett in a time of 4:28.6 – some 4.6s quicker than Flack's Olympic 1500 m time despite running 100 metres further.

Just a day later, Flack tried for a treble with the marathon event despite never having run a race more than 16 kilometres. He was in second place behind Frenchman Albin Lermusiaux—bronze medallist in the 1500 m run, whom Flack had already beaten—for much of the race. After 30–32 kilometres, the Frenchman dropped out and Flack was left in the lead, but 4–8 kilometres later (sources vary), Flack collapsed. In his deliriousness, when a Greek spectator tried to help him, Flack punched him to the ground. Flack was removed from the course and transported to the stadium by a carriage, wherein he was tended to by Prince Nicholas.

Flack also competed in the tennis singles and doubles at the Olympics. He lost in the first round of the singles to Aristidis Akratopoulos of Greece. In the doubles he was paired with an English friend, George S. Robertson. They reached the semi-finals after a walkover in the first round, but lost their only match to Dionysios Kasdaglis of Egypt and Demetrios Petrokokkinos of Greece. They placed third due to their semi-final appearance, but medals for third places were not yet awarded in 1896. The medals were retroactively awarded in January 2008.

Flack was a popular competitor at the 1896 games, and was commonly referred to as the "Lion of Athens".

== Later life ==
In 1898, Flack returned to Victoria and the Melbourne-based family accounting firm, was renamed Flack and Flack. Flack purchased a property near Berwick, where he stayed on weekends and bred Friesian cattle. He never competed for Victoria again (or for Australia after the country was formed in 1901), but he joined the Australian Olympic Committee (AOC) and was part of the first Australian delegation to attend an International Olympic Committee (IOC) Congress. After developing heart problems, Flack died in 1935, following an operation at a private hospital. He was cremated and his ashes were interred at Berwick Cemetery.

== Legacy ==
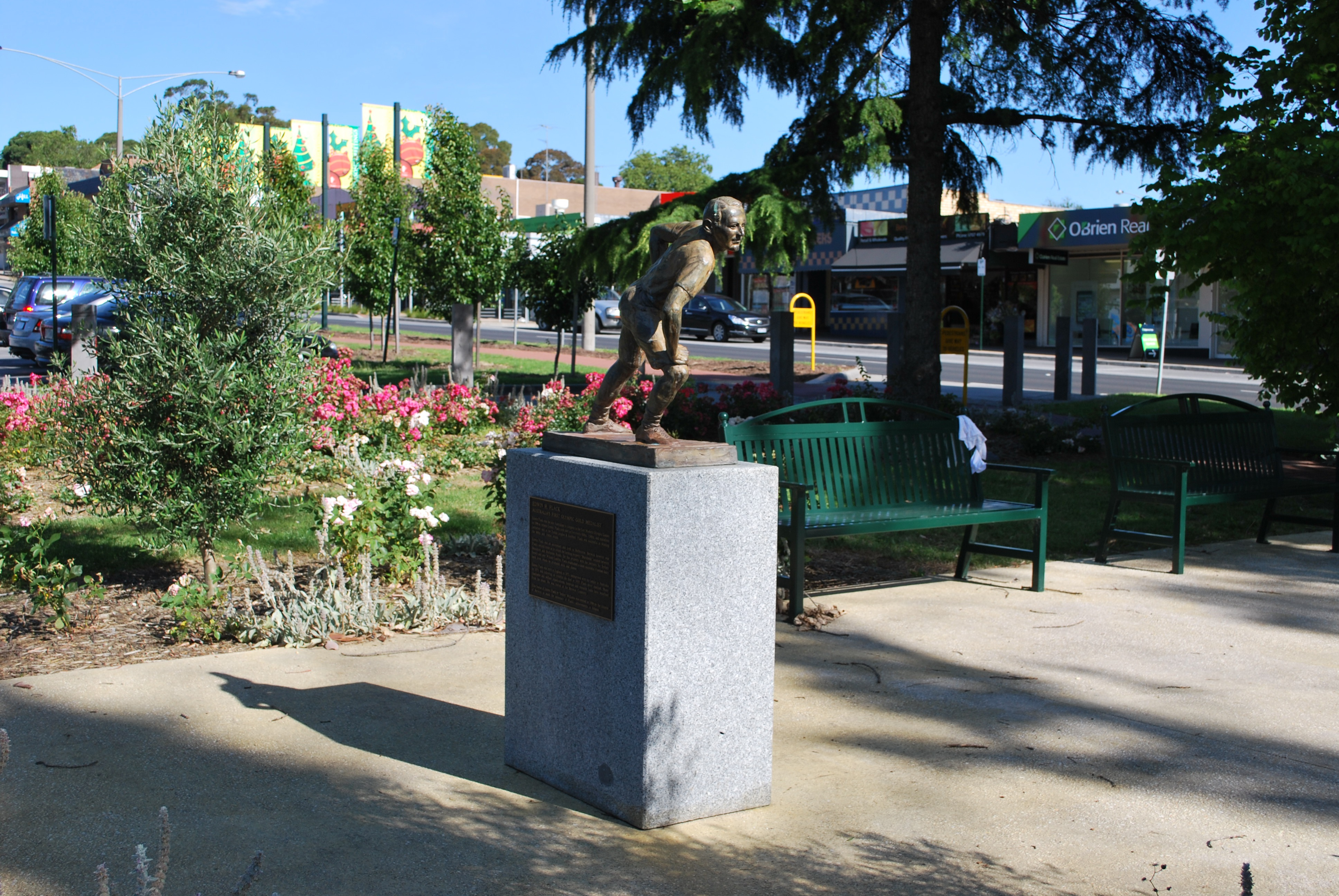
Memorial for Flack in Berwick, Victoria

Flack is indeed commemorated by a bronze statue on the median strip of High Street, Berwick, Vicroria. This is statue was unveiled in 1998 by former middle-distance runner and later Governor of Victoria John Landy. The former Berwick Recreational Reserve was renamed Edwin Flack Reserve in 1996 to honour the town's first Olympic hero and medal winner. The reserve features multiple sporting facilities, including an athletics track, an Australian rules football oval, netball courts and soccer pitch. Melbourne Grammar School's sporting complex at Port Melbourne has been named Edwin Flack Park in honour of their past student.

Flack was commemorated on a 45-cent Australian postage stamp in the Olympic centenary year of 1996. The AOC named one of the streets alongside Stadium Australia at Homebush Bay in Sydney, as Edwin Flack Avenue. Naming the avenue after him is a tribute to his legacy in Australian sporting history, especially in connection to the 2000 Sydney Olympics. In 1985, Flack was inducted into the Sport Australia Hall of Fame, and he was inducted into the Athletics Australia Hall of Fame in 2000. Athletics Australia's Edwin Flack Award, which is awarded to "an athlete who has rendered distinguished service to athletics", is named in his honour.

Flack was portrayed by English actor Benedict Taylor in the 1984 television mini-series The First Olympics: Athens 1896.
