= Friedrich Traun =

German tennis player

Fritz Traun
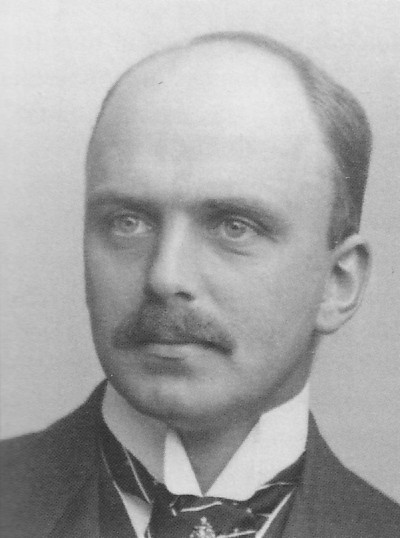
- Traun in 1907
- Full name: Friedrich Adolf Traun
- Country (sports): (Germany) German Empire
- Born: 29 March 1876 Wandsbek, German Empire
- Died: 11 July 1908 (aged 32) Wandsbek, German Empire
Medal record
Men's tennis
Representing a Mixed team
Olympic Games
Gold medal – first place	1896 Athens	Doubles

Friedrich Adolf "Fritz" Traun (29 March 1876 – 11 July 1908) was a German athlete and tennis player. Born into a wealthy family, he participated in the 1896 Summer Olympics and won a gold medal in men's doubles. He committed suicide after being accused of fathering a child out of wedlock.

== Biography ==
Traun was born the son of a wealthy family from Hamburg in 1876. His father, Heinrich Traun (1838–1909), owned a natural rubber manufacturing company and later became senator at Hamburg from 1901 to 1908. In 1885, Fritz began studying chemistry at Dresden University of Technology. In autumn of the same year, he participated in a track and field competition between athletes from Berlin and Hamburg and won the race over a distance of half a mile.

In 1896 Traun competed at the first modern Olympic Games in Athens. Traun placed third in his preliminary heat of the 800 metres and did not advance to the final. He also participated in the tennis tournament. In the singles competition, Traun was defeated in the first round by John Pius Boland of Great Britain and Ireland, the eventual gold medallist. This put Traun in a six-way tie for eighth place in the field of thirteen men. For the doubles tournament, Traun and Boland partnered. They defeated the Greek brothers Aristidis and Konstantinos Akratopoulos in the first round and had a bye for the semifinals. In the final, the pair defeated Greek-Egyptian Dimitrios Kasdaglis and Demetrios Petrokokkinos of Greece to give Traun his own gold medal. In 1897, Traun took part in a track-and-field competition at Baden-Baden and was the first German to reach a length of over 6 meters in long jump.

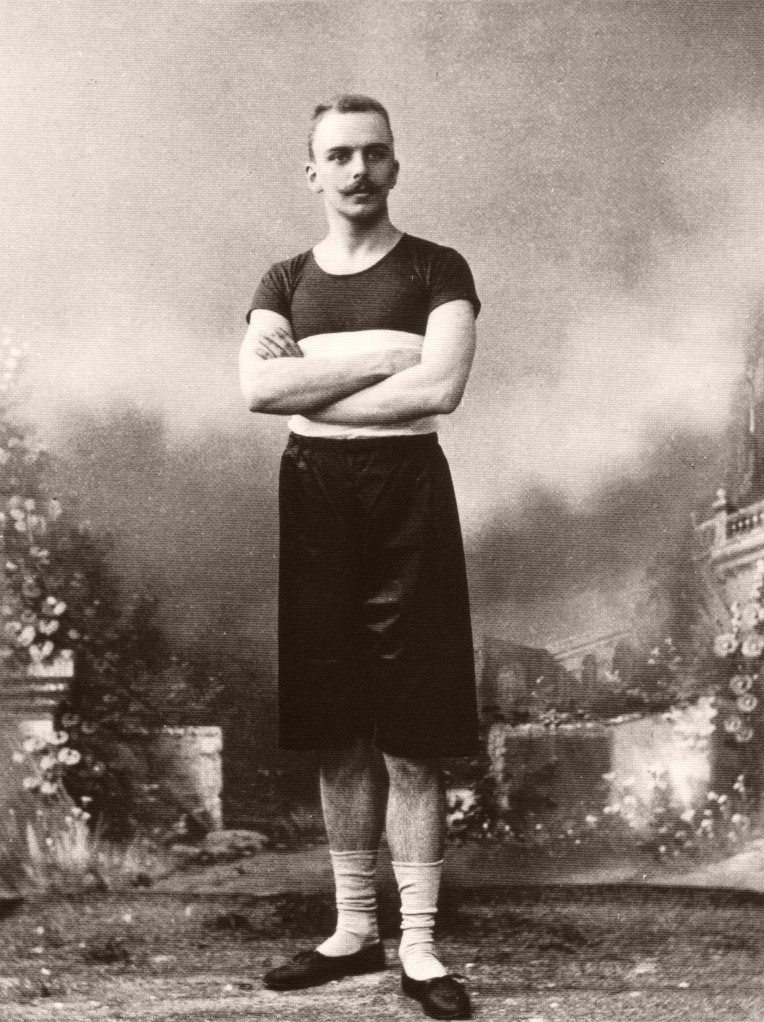
Traun at the 1896 Olympic Games at Athens

In 1899, Traun finished his studies with the degree of a Doctor of Science. His thesis "On the knowledge of dibromomesitol bromide and its transformation products" received the best possible mark, summa cum laude. After working as a scientist at the Sorbonne at Paris for two years, he decided to enter his father's company. In 1902, Traun made a business trip to the United States in order to visit the company's branch on Long Island. The following winter, he fell ill of tuberculosis. Upon recommendation of Carl Schurz, Traun spent the spring of 1903 in a hotel at Augusta, Georgia, before returning to Germany.

As he did not fully recover from his illness, he mostly spent the following years at health spas in the Alps such as St. Moritz and Davos. In addition, he began to work as a sports journalist and tournament organizer. In 1906, he was the director of the German Tennis Championships at Hamburg, and its referee in 1907. In the same year, he met Friedel Preetorius (1884–1938), the daughter of the wealthy entrepreneur Wilhelm Preetorius from Mainz, during the Kiel Week. The following March, both married at Hamburg, and in their honeymoon they drove as far as Algiers in Friedrich's car. After their return, the couple lived at the exclusive Park Hôtel Teufelsbrücke at Hamburg.

On the morning of 11 July 1908, a young lady entered the hotel and claimed that she was also married to Traun and even had children by him. After meeting with Traun, he shot himself in the bathroom of his apartment. Neither the lady's identity nor the validity of her claim is known today. However, it seems very likely that she told the truth and Traun, facing a major social scandal at that time, killed himself. Friedrich's father Heinrich Traun adopted Friedel Preetorius who was already pregnant and gave birth to her daughter Lieselotte in February 1909. She later married Ludwig Strecker, owner of B. Schott's Söhne (today Schott Music). Friedrich Traun was buried in the family's grave at the Ohlsdorf Cemetery.
