= George Marshall (athlete) =

British middle-distance runner

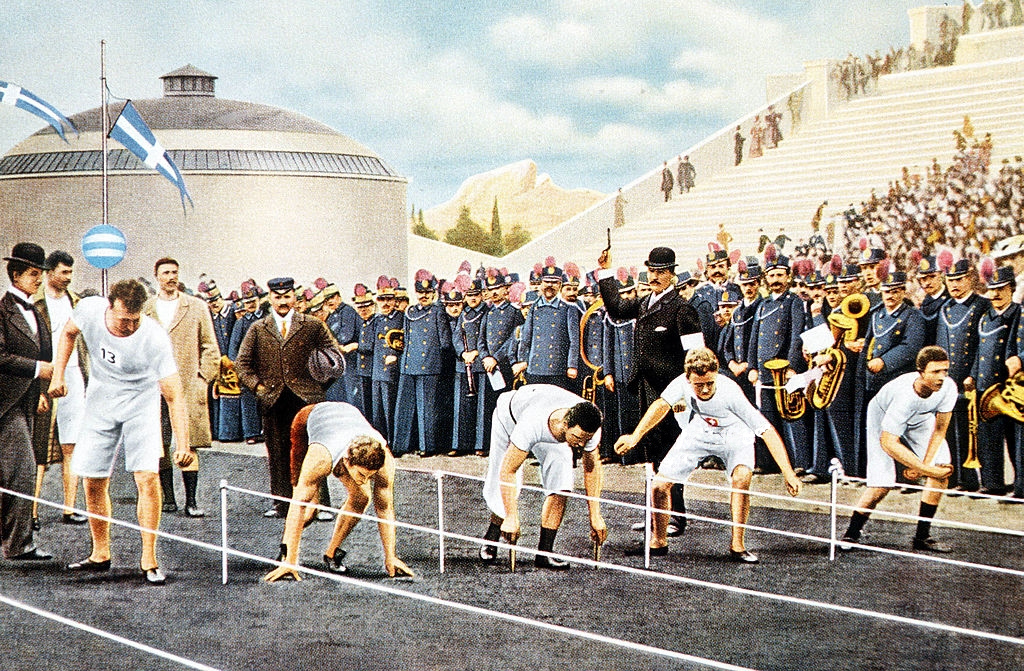
- 100m sprint 1896 Olympics

Personal information
- Nationality: British (English)
- Born: 2 October 1876 Patras, Greece
- Died: Unknown

Sport
- Sport: Athletics / Tennis
- Event: 100, 400, 800, 1500m
- Club: Panellinios GS, Athina
Medal record
Representing Great Britain

George Herbert Marshall (born 2 October 1876, date of death unknown) was a British track and field athlete who competed at the 1896 Summer Olympics.

== Biography ==
Marshall was born in Patras, Greece and was the son of British merchant and shipping agent. He spent some of his childhood in Edinburgh, where he boarded at school.

Marshall competed at the 1896 Olympic Games in Athens. He was listed as being affiliated with "London" or "Oxford" in the programme for the athletics events, but as a member of the Panathinaikos Club of Patras for tennis.

Marshall ran in the 100 metres, in the second heat of the first event of the first day of the first modern Games. He finished last of five runners in his preliminary heat and did not advance to the final. He also competed in the 800 metres, again finishing in last place of the four runners in his preliminary heat. He was entered in, but did not compete in, the men's singles and men's doubles (with Frank Marshall) tennis events.
