= George S. Robertson =

British tennis player

George Robertson
Personal information
- Nationality: British (English)
- Born: 25 May 1872 London, England
- Died: 29 January 1967 (aged 94) London, England

Sport
- Sport: Tennis / Athletics
- Event: shot put/discus
- Club: University of Oxford AC; Achilles Club
Medal record
Representing Great Britain
Men's tennis
| Bronze medal – third place | 1896 Athens | Doubles |

Sir George Stuart Robertson KC FSA (25 May 1872 – 29 January 1967) was a British barrister, public servant, athlete, tennis player, and classical scholar. He competed at the 1896 Summer Olympics in Athens.

== Biography ==
Robertson was educated at Winchester College and New College, Oxford, where he had won the Gaisford Prize for Greek Verse in 1894 and an Oxford Blue for hammer throwing. In 1896, he saw an advertisement in the window of a London travel agent, and later explained "Greek classics were my proper academic field, so I could hardly resist a go at the Olympics, could I?" Robertson paid £11 to travel to Athens for the inaugural modern games. On arrival there, he was dismayed to find that hammer throwing, the discipline he was most proficient in, was not to be competed in at the games. However, in the spirit of amateurism he entered for the shot put and the discus instead.

In the discus throw, he came fourth, with a distance of 25.20 metres; the worst result ever recorded in the Olympics discus.

In the singles tennis tournament, Robertson was defeated in the first round by Konstantinos Paspatis of Greece. This put him in a six-way tie for eighth (last) in the field of thirteen competitors. In the tennis doubles, Robertson partnered the Australian Edwin Flack. The pair received a bye in the first round, advancing them to the semi-finals and guaranteeing them a top three place before they had played a game. They lost their semifinal match to Dionysios Kasdaglis of Egypt and Demetrios Petrokokkinos of Greece, finishing third.

Robertson is also remembered for his performance in the ceremony which followed the games, when he recited an ode to athletic prowess which he had composed in Ancient Greek; this feat was rewarded by the King of Greece who bestowed an olive and laurel wreath.

He had a successful career after athletics. He was called to the Bar by the Middle Temple in 1899. He served as Chief Registrar of Friendly Societies (1912 to 1937) and as Industrial Assurance Commissioner (1923 to 1937), and was also a director of the Prudential Assurance Company. He was knighted in the 1928 Birthday Honours.
