= Demetrios Petrokokkinos =

Greek tennis player (1878–1942)

Olympic medal record

Men's tennis

Representing Greece
Silver medal – second place	1896 Athens	Doubles

Demetrios Stephen Petrokokkinos (Greek: Δημήτριος Πετροκόκκινος, 17 April 1878 in Ilford (registered at birth in England as Demetrius Stephen Petrocochino) – 10 May 1942 in Cape Town) was a Greek tennis player. He competed at the 1896 Summer Olympics in Athens.

Petrokokkinos was defeated in the first round of the singles tournament by fellow Greek Evangelos Rallis. This put him in a six-way tie for eighth (last) place among the thirteen man field. In the doubles tournament, Petrokokkinos again faced Rallis in the first round. This time, Petrokokkinos and his partner Dionysios Kasdaglis a Greek from Egypt, a team nowadays considered a Greek team, defeated Rallis and his partner Konstantinos Paspatis. Petrokokkinos and Kasdaglis faced Edwin Flack of Australia and George S. Robertson of Great Britain and Ireland in the semifinals, again winning the match to advance to the final. There, they met Irishman John Pius Boland and German Friedrich Traun, to whom they lost to place second.
