= Dimitrios Kasdaglis =

British tennis player of greek origin

Olympic medal record

Men's tennis

Representing Greece
Silver medal – second place	1896 Athens	Singles
Silver medal – second place	1896 Athens	Doubles

Dimitrios Emmanuel Kasdaglis (Greek: Δημήτριος Εμμανουήλ Κάσδαγλης, also written Demetrius, Casdagli[s]; 10 October 1872 – 6 July 1931) was a Greek-Egyptian tennis player. He competed in the 1896 Summer Olympics in Athens and the 1906 Intercalated Games, also in Athens. In some sources his first name is erroneously given as Dionysios (Greek: Διονύσιος).

== Career ==
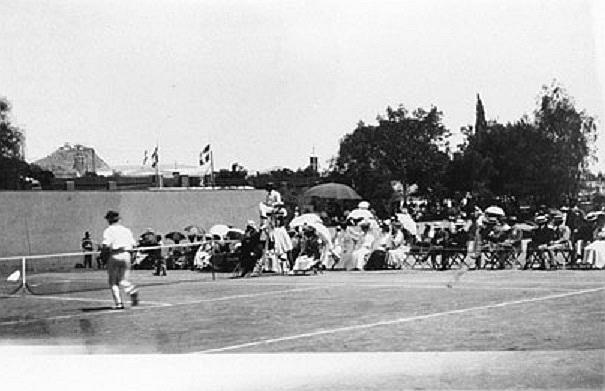
The men's singles final in 1896, which Kasdaglis lost to Boland

Kasdaglis was born in Salford, England, was domiciled in the Khedivate of Egypt but according to the official bulletin he participated as a member of the Greek team. He made it to the finals in both the singles and doubles events. In the singles, he defeated Defert of France in the first round, Konstantinos Akratopoulos of Greece in the second, and Momcsilló Tapavicza of Hungary in the semifinals before facing John Pius Boland of Great Britain and Ireland in the final. Boland proved the better player, and Kasdaglis finished second. The medal is credited to Kasdaglis as a Greek by the International Olympic Committee.

For the doubles tournament, Kasdaglis paired with Demetrios Petrokokkinos in a team which nowadays is considered a Greek team. They defeated another pair of Greeks, Konstantinos Paspatis and Evangelos Rallis, in the first round and the British/Australian pair of George S. Robertson and Edwin Flack in the semifinals. In the final, Kasdaglis again faced Boland, this time paired with Friedrich Traun of Germany. Kasdaglis and Petrokokkinos lost that match to give Kasdaglis his second silver medal.

He died in 1931 in Bad Nauheim, Germany.
