= Martin-Joseph Adrien =

French operatic bass

Martin-Joseph Adrien (also Andrien dit la Neuville; 26 May 1766 – 19 November 1822) was a French operatic bass.

== Life ==
He was born at Liège, Belgium on 26 May 1766. He was the premier bass singer at the Paris Opéra from 1785 to 1804 and took alternative operatic roles with another great singer, Auguste-Athanase Chéron (1760-1829); afterwards he became choirmaster at the opera. In March 1822 Martin-Joseph succeeded Lainé as professor of declamation at the École royale de musique. Unfortunately, he did not live long to enjoy his new position. Martin-Joseph died November 1822.

Some critics considered Martin-Joseph's voice to be too harsh. However, he was an excellent actor. Martin-Joseph's musical talents did not stop with signing. He was also a composer. There are two surviving songs which deal with the aftermath of the French Revolution and foreign invasion. The first was entitled Hymne à la Victoire (1795) and the second hymn to the martyrs for liberty.

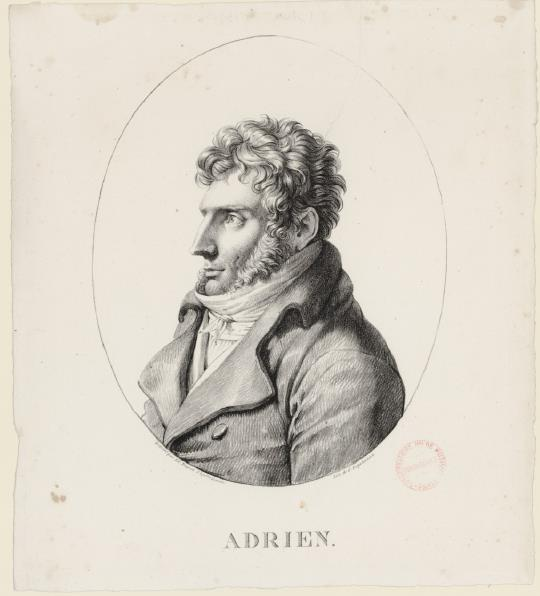
Martin Joseph Adrien

In 1813, Martin-Joseph married the Baroness Gabrielle-Constance de Philippy de Bucelly d'Estrées (1782-1854), daughter of Albert Philippi de Bucelly du Tronquoy, Baron d' Estrées (1745-1808) and Catherine Georgia (1753-1810). Martin-Joseph and Gabrielle-Constance issued two equally talented musicians: Atala Thérèse Adrien (1814-1865), wife of the French composer Pierre-François Wartel (1806-1882) and Rosine-Charlotte Adrien, the wife of renowned music teacher François Alexandre Nicolas Chéri Delsarte (1811-1871). The artistic legacy of the Adrien brothers continued on to the next generations. In particular, the children of Delsarte become involved in painting and sculpting and so did his grand-children. Among DelSarte's notable descendants stands out the painters Marie Magdeleine Real del Sarte, née DelSarte, (1853-1927) and Thérèse Geraldy (1884-1865), and the sculptor Maxime Réal del Sarte .

== Family ==
Martin-Joseph came from an artistic family. He was the son of Martin-Joseph Adrien and Marie-Thérèse Cantillon. In total, he had five siblings, many of them musicians. Martin-Joseph's two other brothers Arnold-Michel Adrien dit Adrien l'Ainé (1756-1814) and Jacques-François-Ferdinand Adrien (1760-1830) were also involved in the Paris musical world. They composed music for the revolutionary government in Paris.
