= Wartel =

Wartel is a surname. Notable people with the name include:

- Émile Wartel (1834–1907), opera singer and teacher active in Paris
- François Wartel (born 1806), French tenor and music educator
- Marie-Christine Wartel (born 1951), French athlete in high jump and pentathlon
- Paul Wartel (1903–1976), French footballer, manager and coach
- Thérèse Wartel (1814–1865), French pianist, music educator, composer and critic
