= Henri Royer =

French painter (1869–1938)

Henri Paul Royer
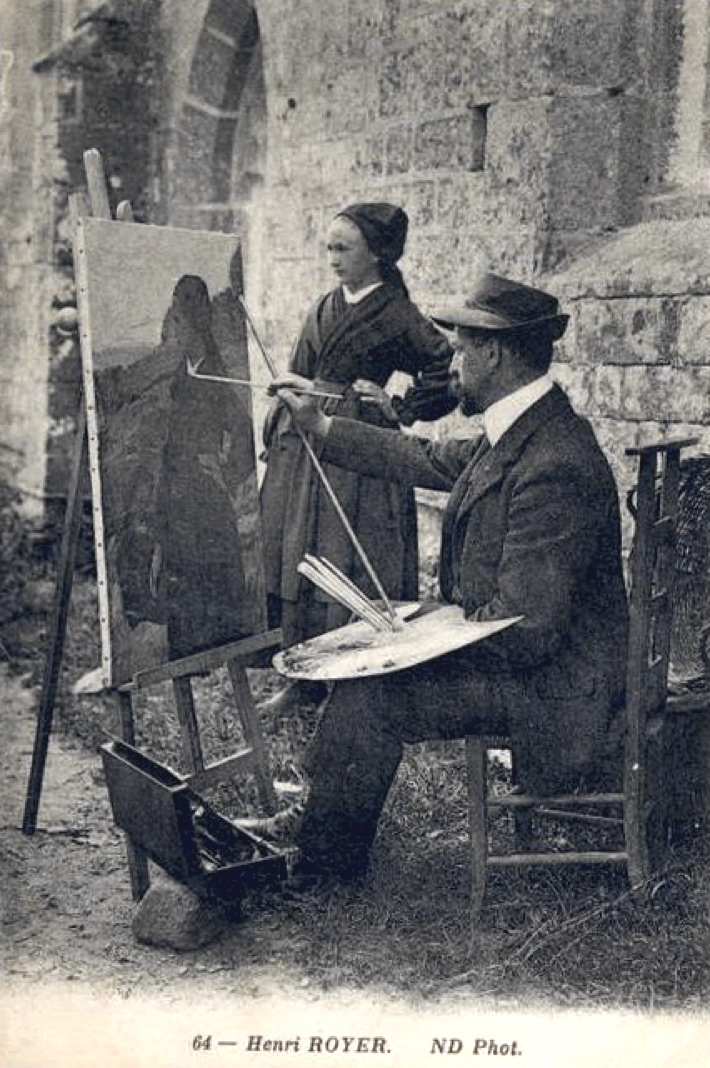
- Henri Royer Painting on the Île de Sein, old postcard
- Born: 22 January 1869; Nancy, France
- Died: 31 October 1938 (aged 69); Neuilly-sur-Seine, France
- Occupation: Painter

Henri Paul Royer (22 January 1869 – 31 October 1938) was a French painter, remembered especially for his genre works from Brittany. A painter of genre, portraitist and landscape artist, he travelled throughout America and Europe during his life.

== Biography ==
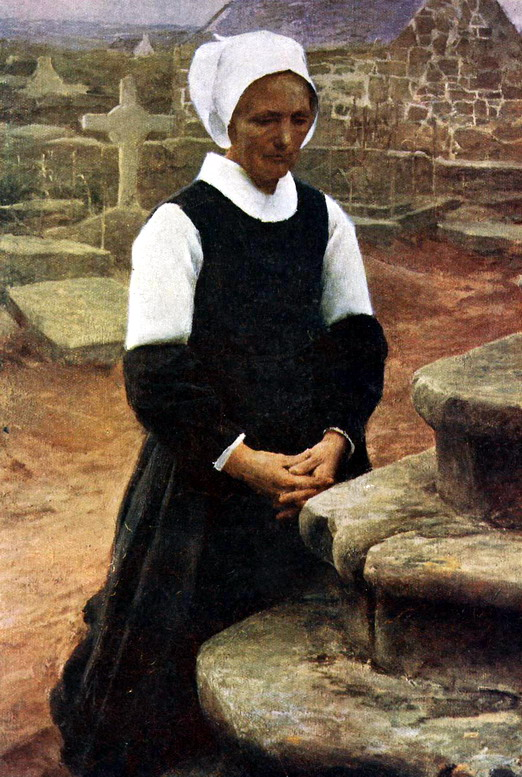
Henri Royer: Paysanne au tombeau

Royer was born in Nancy. He was the son of Jules Royer (1845–1900), the founder of one of Nancy's most significant lithographic printing establishments located on Rue de la Salpêtrière. Raised in the art world from a young age, Royer enrolled at the Nancy School of Fine Arts, where he met Émile Friant. Under the tutelage of Antoine Vierling and Louis-Théodore Devilly, he showcased his initial artworks at the Salon de Nancy, including Fight between two young typos and Young plasterer. These early successes prompted his parents and teachers to encourage a study trip to Holland with Friant, who subsequently left a lasting impact on Royer.

After his return in 1888, Royer furthered his studies at the École des Beaux-Arts in Paris. In 1890, he continued his studies at the Académie Julian under the guidance of Jules Joseph Lefebvre and François Flameng. Royer became a regular exhibitor at the Paris Salon, specializing in genre paintings and portraits. As a portraitist, he encountered many famous figures from the aristocracy, politics, diplomacy, science and the arts. As a result, his critics described him as one of Ingres' disciples.

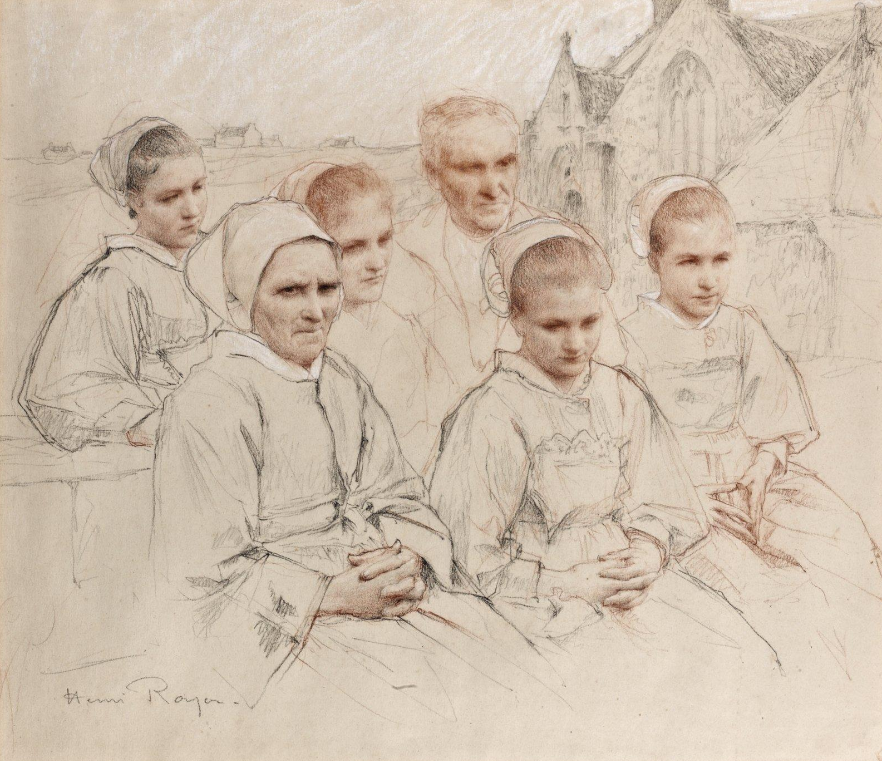
Family from Brittany praying in front of the Pont-Croix Church, 47x53cm

In 1896, accompanied by his wife, he arrived in Brittany, here he would spend much of his life, particularly in the vicinity of Audierne. Unlike other artists, his primary interest lay in the people, rather than the scenery. In order to become closer to them, he even learnt to speak Breton. His paintings reveal careful attention to their costumes. As a devout Catholic, he also painted religious subjects, such as solitary figures in prayer.

Royer taught at the Académie Julian and at the École des Beaux-Arts. Among his many students were Georgina and Lucilio de Albuquerque, Fréderic Fiebig, Jacques Majorelle, Thérèse Geraldy and Émile Louis Picault.

When the First World War broke out, he was first incorporated into the 41st Infantry Regiment. He was awarded the Croix de Guerre on 17 November 1915 and the Military Cross on 10 August 1916. Thereafter, he joined the 1st Regiment of Engineering camouflage section on 1 November 1916. His work was part of the painting event in the art competition at the 1932 Summer Olympics.

He was promoted to officer of the Legion of Honor on 11 August 1931. He died seven years later, in Neuilly-sur-Seine, on 31 October 1938.

== Signature ==
He signed his artwork Henri Royer.

== Students ==
A teacher at the Académie Julian in Paris and at the École des Beaux-Arts in Paris, Henri Royer had many students in his studio.

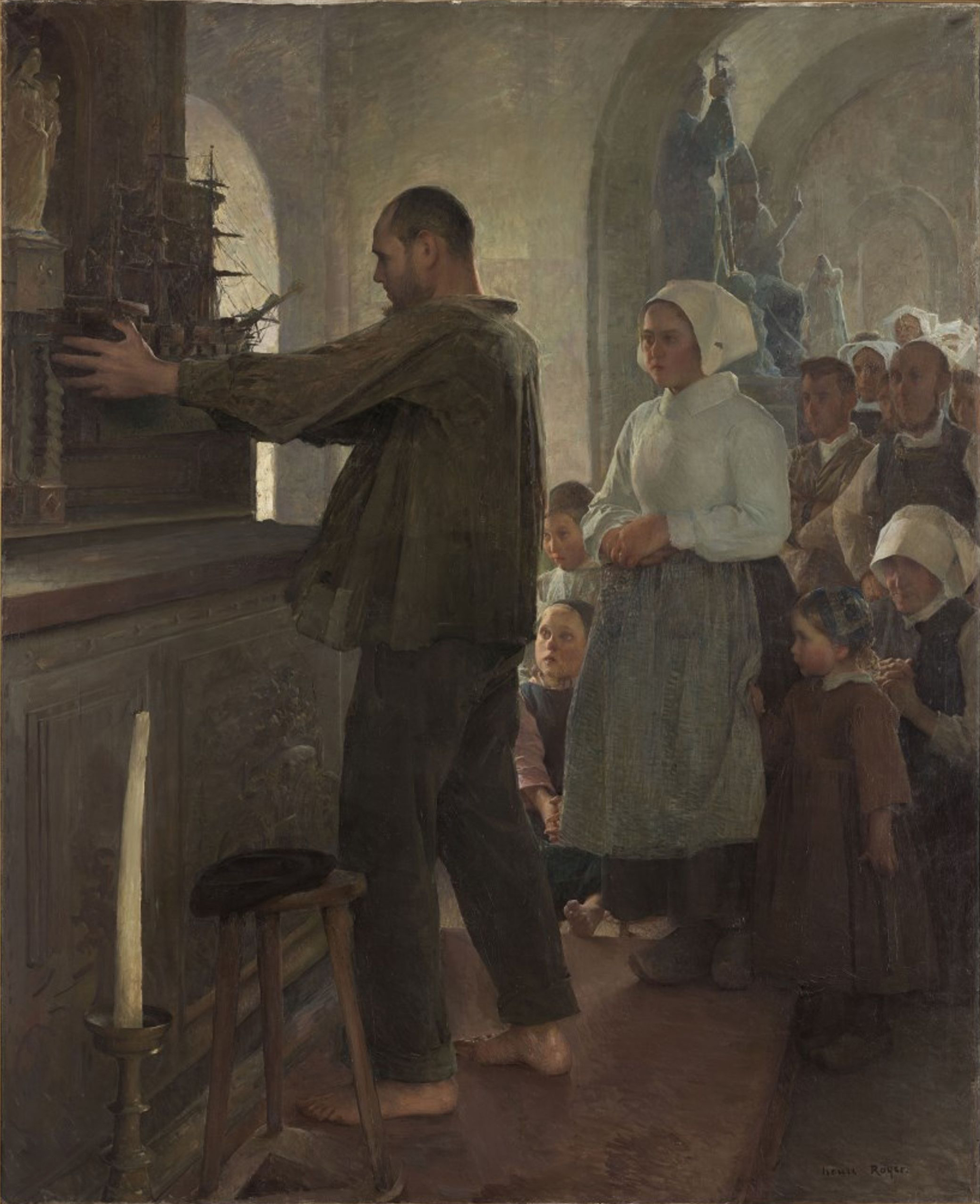
The Ex-voto (1898), musée des beaux-arts de Quimper.

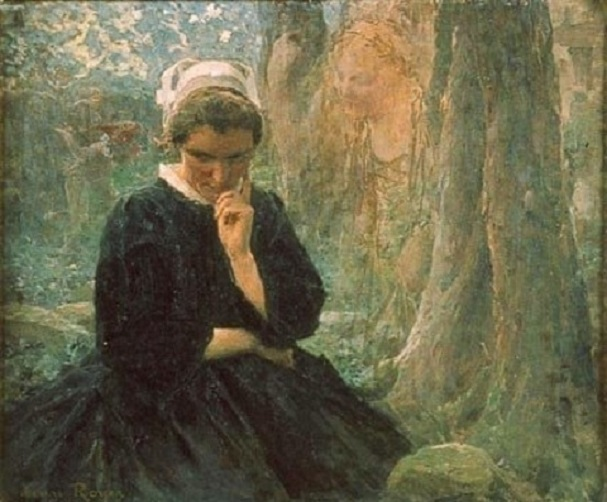
The Meadow of legends, musée des beaux-arts de Brest

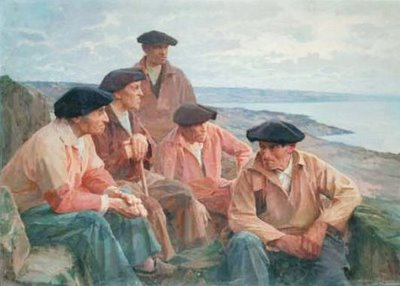
In front of the sea (1935)

=== At the Académie Julian ===
- Gustave Alaux (1887–1965)
- Georgina de Albuquerque (1885–1962)
- Raoul Barré (1896)
- Maurice Alexandre Berthon (1888–1914)
- Henri Blahay (1869–1941)
- Albert Braïtou-Sala (1885–1972)
- Étienne Buffet (1866–1948)
- Frédéric Fiebig (1885–1953)
- Thérèse Geraldy (1884–1965)
- Léonie Humbert-Vignot (1878–1960)
- Georges Lebacq (1876–1950)
- Jacques Majorelle (1886–1962)

=== Unlocated workshop ===
- Lucílio de Albuquerque (1877–1939)
- Caroline Helena Armington (1875–1939)
- Frank Armington (1876–1941)
- Diógenes Campos Ayres (1881–1944)
- Jeanne-Marie Barbey (1876–1961)
- Teodoro Braga (1872–1935)
- Henri-Georges Bréard (1873–1950)
- Rodolfo Chambelland (1879–1967)
- Roberto Colin
- Frederick Garrison Hall (1879–1946)
- Mildred Jones (1899–1991)
- Chas Laborde (1886–1941)
- Eric Spencer Macky (1880–1958)
- Jeanne Louise Jacontot Mahudez (1876–1956)
- Marthe Orant (1874–1957)
- Émile Picault (1833–1915)
- André Prévot-Valéri (1890–1959)
- Jean Scherbeck (1898–1989)
- William Posey Silva (1859–1948)
- Henry Solon (1873–1958)
- Valle Júnior (1889–1958)

== Expositions ==
- In 2008, an exhibition was organized in Audierne to pay tribute to Royer.

== Sources and bibliography ==
=== Bibliography ===
- Le Pays lorrain / Henri Royer; Garcot M., Gaudel H., Thiry J.; Berger-Levrault, Nancy; N°7 de juillet 1939; ISSN 0031-3394
- Hommage de la Lorraine à la France : à l'occasion du bicentenaire de leur réunion, 1766-1966; Académie de Stanislas; Berger-Levrault, Nancy; 1966; (368 pages); Notice n° : FRBNF31766545
- Gabriel P. Weisberg, Karal Ann Marling; Montmartre and the Making of Mass Culture; Rutgers University Press, London; 2001; (296 pages); ISBN 0-8135-3008-3
- Peinture et art nouveau: l'École de Nancy [exposition], Musée des beaux-arts de Nancy, 24 avril-26 juillet 1999. Paris: Réunion des musées nationaux. 1999. ISBN 2-7118-3839-0.
- Rothenstein, William; Men and Memories, a History of the Arts 1872- 1922, Being the Recollections of William Rothenstein; Tudor Pub. Co., New York; 1924; OLC: 19014724, republished by Kessinger Publishing; 2005; (504 pages); ISBN 141793705X
- Société des Artistes Français. Salon de 1928: Exposition Annuelle des Beaux-Arts, 1928.
- Société lorraine des amis des arts (January 1903). "Nos exposants : Henri Royer". Bulletin des sociétés artistiques de l'Est. No. 1. Imprimerie coopérative de l'Est. pp. 84–88.
- Conseil des musées nationaux (2002). Revue du Louvre: la revue des musées de France. Vol. 52.
- Thiery, Frédéric (March 2007). "La première veste de camouflage de guerre du monde » est inventée par Louis Guingot". Guerres mondiales et conflits contemporains. No. 227. pp. 7–21.
