= Picault =

Picault is a surname. Notable people with the surname include:

- Aude Picault, French comics artist
- Émile Louis Picault (1833–1915), French sculptor
- Fafà Picault (born 1991), American soccer player
- Lazare Picault, 18th century French explorer
- Chantal Picault (born 1953), French television director
