= Frédéric Fiebig =

French painter (1885–1953)

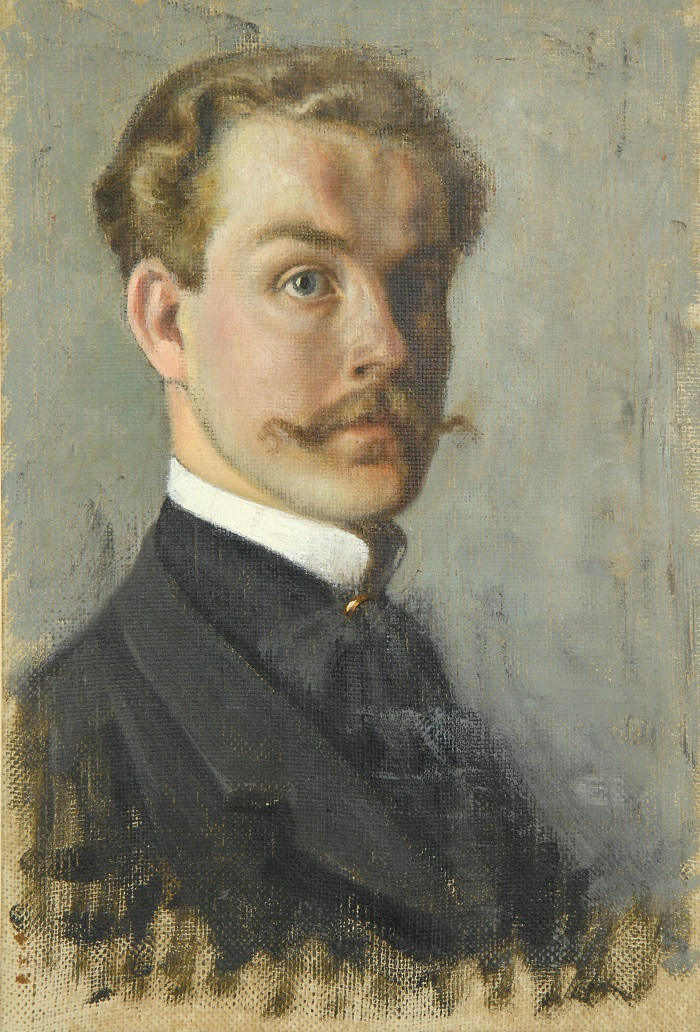
- Self-portrait (1905)
- Born: Frederiks Fībigs; 17 May 1885; Talsi, Courland Governorate, Russian Empire
- Died: 6 February 1953 (aged 67); Sélestat, France
- Education: Imperial School for the Promotion of Arts of Saint Petersburg (Russia); Académie Julian (Paris, France)
- Notable work: Painting, drawing, wood and linoleum prints
- Style: Expressionism, Impressionism, Fauvism, Cubism
- Movement: Die Brücke
- Patrons: Elisabet Auguste Krause

Frédéric Fiebig (Latvian: Frederiks Fībigs; 1885–1953) was a Latvian-born painter who lived in France. He was influenced by both Post-Impressionism and Cubism and is considered a member of the Expressionist movement. Fiebig was a great traveler, passionate about urban landscape and nature, where he drew his inspiration, until a series of family dramas forced him to settle in Alsace (East of France).

== Biography ==
=== Early years in Courland and Imperial Russia ===
Frédéric Fiebig was born in a family of Baltic German father and Latvian mother (born Laiveniece) - both lived in Talsi near Riga and were citizens of the Courland Governorate, now Latvia (then administered by the Russian Empire since the Treaty of Nystad). His father was a carpenter and his mother a seamstress. His native small town is situated near the Baltic Sea, is nicknamed "the Pearl of Kurzeme" or "the city with nine hills and two lakes". The city hosted an important Jewish community, and a member of this community, Elisabet Auguste Krause, became his teacher. He attended the Alexander High School in Riga in 1905. Elisabet, who was 20 years his senior, liked the painting of the young man and his talent. She secretly married him in 1906, supported him financially and encouraged him to continue his studies at the Imperial Academy of Arts of St Petersburg to improve his artistic skills. Saint Petersburg in Russia is the nearest prominent art center. The young painter traveled through the seven hundred kilometers which separated him from this city and settled there to study under the guidance of Prof. Dmitry Nicolajevich Kardovsky, who was also an active Russian painter and art dealer. The rather repetitive painting work entrusted to him in the Kardovsky workshop, where the orders were mainly directed towards classical painting, especially portraits, eventually became of little interest to him; Fiebig sought a more personal style and was already attracted by a less figurative and much more experimental form of art. Several of his works of this period, including realistic representations of the main street of Talsi, are exhibited in that city's museum. Fiebig's style at that time was simple, figurative and precise, but he profoundly distanced himself from it after leaving Saint Petersburg.

=== A new artistic life in Paris ===
==== Finding his own style in Paris ====
Unsatisfied with the classical teachings of Saint Petersburg, he decided to leave for Paris, the arts capital of the time. After a brief stay in his hometown, he traveled with Elisabet two thousand three hundred kilometers to settle there. He was accepted at the prestigious Académie Julian, from September 1907 to March 1908. He was a student of portraitist and landscape painter Henri Royer and of portraitist Marcel Baschet. He discovered the painters of the Barbizon school and Claude Monet. Success came quickly. His style, specific to this period, consisted of large and sensual touches with a fluid contour, parallel to that of Georges Rouault. LikeAlbert Marquet, his contemporary, Fiebig drew from the same sources of inspiration: Paris and the banks of the river Seine, then Italy. The parallel between the two men is quite striking; moreover, they are both great travelers sharing many subjects of common inspiration, quiet personalities and a desire to stay aside from mundanities. In 1911–1912, Fiebig brightened his palette under the sun of southern Europe by traveling on foot from Lugano (Switzerland) to Naples (South of Italy). His views of the Italian cities will be greeted by the French poet, Guillaume Apollinaire. He also painted, in the wake of the Fauves, luminous landscapes and numerous olive trees. He became fascinated by the extraordinary light that modulates colors and shapes at different times of the day.

In 1912, the Bernheim-Jeune art gallery staged Fiebig's first solo exhibition and encouraged him, but with a mild warning: "You are ten years ahead of your time." That this rather quiet artist did not lack humor and fantasy is shown by his woodblock prints appearing in 1912 in the 55th issue of the magazine "Les Tendances Nouvelles" (The New Trends), which was promoted by the International Union of Fine Arts, Literature, Sciences and Industry, a French artists' association founded by Alexis Mérodack-Jeanneau. The magazine's honor committee was very visible and included a number of prestigious artists such as D'Annunzio, Degas, Dierx, D'Indy, Huysmans, Geffroy, Monet, and Rodin. In 1913-1914, his work was included in the third exhibit of Latvian artists in Riga. Fiebig liked tales and epic novels such as Don Quixote, for which he made a series of woodblock prints.

Unfortunately, the fame of the painter did not have time to spread on the art market before the First World War began in Europe. As a native of Courland, a province under German administration since the creation of the Ober Ost in 1915, Fiebig was considered a German citizen. He did not feel safe in Paris and decided to leave the French capital city and take refuge in the Landes (South West of France near the Atlantic coast).

==== The beginning of celebrity after WW1 ====
After the armistice, he returned to Paris where he began to pursue his artistic career. His silent and sometime difficult personality does not facilitate the relationships with the world of art and the art galleries for which mundanities and relationships are important. However, he participated in various art fairs. His style continues to change, he uses the knife more often than the brush. His palette is rich and colorful. His canvas is filed with polygons, mostly tapered triangles that remind of Cézanne and Cubism. Once again, the success is coming and the art critics are very positive on his work. The young artist regularly exhibits his paintings at the "Salon d'Automne" and at the "Indépendants" in Paris, then in Barcelona, London and New York. From 1921, he also contributed to collective exhibitions of Russian artists in Harbin, Shanghai, Moscow, Vladivostok.

His wife Elisabet continued to financially support the whole family at times when Fiebig struggled to make a living, including Raya (1919-2007) and Eric (1921-1932), the two children Fiebig had with Debora Logak, 22-year old Jewish Ukrainian student. Elisabet welcomed not only her husband's children as her own but also Debora, who had been rejected by her own family. Debora separated from the painter after the birth of Eric.

Fiebieg was haunted by the genetic disease that undermined his son's health; the Fiebig family left Paris and settled in Ladevèze and Lescar (near the Pyrénées, in France), after doctors recommended an extended stay in the mountain fresh air for the young boy. Two years later, the family returned to Paris, and the painter found his inspiration on the banks of the river Seine and in the streets of the city. He painted on small canvases and some larger formats, but never fell into excessive dimensions. He painted Paris precisely, in often vibrant and delicate tones, the Luxembourg garden, the zinc roofs, the piles of sand that line the river Seine for the barges, and many other subjects that make him a Parisian painter. Nevertheless, Fiebig always felt unwelcome and misunderstood in Paris.

=== Tough times and oblivion in Alsace ===
==== Moving to Alsace and retiring in Tännchel ====
His painting was gradually enriched with new concepts that brought him closer to expressionism and the conciseness of abstract art. He extracted his subjects from his immediate environment and fixed them on canvas under unusual angles. He had a keen sense of geometric simplification of forms and his search for delivering a surprising perspective was never trivial. He remained himself and shared his emotions with this unusual look on the urban landscape that surrounded him. The result was a well controlled oscillation between figurative and abstract art. He continued to draw his inspiration from the countryside and remained close to nature. After brief journeys in the south-west, he finally settled in 1929, in Alsace in the small city of Sélestat with his wife Elisabet, his daughter Raya and his son Eric. The fresh air of the Vosges mountains seemed better for the health of his son. Fiebig worked on themes between the city landscape and nature.

In 1932, Eric died of his long illness. He was 11 years old. This first family drama broke the painter and he decided to settle permanently in Sélestat where a street now bears his name. In 1934, he remained so depressed that he retired to the Tännchel mountains where he lived as a hermit in the Grimmelshütte, a poor forest shelter. This place, known for ancient megalithic cults, seemed to have encouraged him to move forward. He kept close to nature, which he observed and painted on countless small "in carto" formats to find peace. It was said of him that he "eats nettles and drinks rainwater". He stayed there all winter, which was particularly harsh, and became known as the ghost of Tännchel, though some villagers still brought him supplies from time to time. "Hearing the beating of the heart of the earth, feeling your blood circulating and translating these feelings at least roughly into my painting, that's what I call living," he said.

In town, people were gossiping on this secluded painter; the hikers or the woodcutters whom he came across from time to time in the mountain believed that he was a madman. On 8 December 1934, the newspaper of Sélestat published a long article on the ghost of the Tännchel in which Fiebig was presented as a "very bearded and very hairy" person who had a rat as his sole companion. In addition, not everyone appreciated the painter's presence in the shelter. In 1935, the Gendarmerie came and found him: he was obliged to go down to the valley in Sélestat. "If his stay had lasted more than a year, he could have pretended to become the tenant of the refuge."

Being a bit more serene in 1936, he agreed to submit to the important regional exhibition of the "Artists and Friends of the Arts of Colmar". It was a success. His work was welcome again and he delivered nearly 100 paintings that year. He painted close to 600 canvases in Alsace, essentially small sizes representing the surrounding landscape in all seasons.

Unfortunately, the annexation of Alsace by Nazi Germany and the effects of the Depression vaporized his savings and made him very poor again.

==== Family tragedies and the upcoming WW2 ====
In addition, several tragedies continued to strike him. In 1942 his wife Elisabet died and in 1943 his daughter Raya, born of a Jewish mother, was deported to the Gaggenau internment camp by the Nazis who occupied Alsace. Debora Logak, the mother of his children, living in Montrouge near Paris, was arrested in July 1942 in the sinister French police raid of the Vélodrome d'Hiver. She was held at Drancy internment camp and was believed to have been summarily killed at the Auschwitz internment camp. Having heard that the Third Reich supported artists, Fiebig sent a pension request to Goebbels, who could not have cared less about the painter's works. Although German by birth, Fiebig was not well accepted by the Nazi administration, especially as a native of Courland. He was almost forced to display his work during the military occupation of France by Germany in exchange for vague promises of a pension that would never materialise. His daughter Raya was miraculously spared after a short Nazi arrest.

In spite of multiple requests, French citizenship would never be granted to Fiebig. Hurt by a difficult life during both world wars and personal dramas, he became almost blind from 1946 on, and could no longer paint or work. After the war, he was sent in 1948 to the Schweisguth barracks for the needy in Sélestat. Fiebig would remain nostalgic for the landscapes of Courland all his life. He died in poverty in Sélestat on 6 February 1953, leaving behind Raya and significant but unrecognized art. His relatives reported that he had been buried in the Protestant cemetery, but the town of Sélestat, whose street is named after him, has no record of his grave in its registers.

Fiebig’s works were stored in boxes and almost forgotten in an attic until resurfacing again thanks to the persistence of his daughter Raya, who made his art better known beginning in 1975. Joseph Logel, a prominent member of the Sélestat community and close to the painter's family, devoted some writings to Fiebig, and became the universal legatee of Fiebig's work. But, if he helped to make the work of Fiebig better known, Logel apparently "drained" the bank accounts of Raya, the artist's daughter. In 2006, the former Selestadian official and his son were tried for their exploitation and received (suspended) sentences of one year.

Raya Fiebig died childless in January 2007.

=== Fiebig: A European Expressionist ===
"I was poor, I had a German name, I had a Nordic mindset: all things that made it impossible for me to succeed quickly. But positive reviews encouraged me." Frédéric Fiebig

His work, praised by Guillaume Apollinaire, Francis Carco, and André Salmon, is not enough to get him out of oblivion; Fiebig is still hardly known in Alsace where he spent half of his life. Yet the art critic Clément Morrolobt ("Morro") considers him "an impressionist in the true sense of the word". French academician and art specialist, Maurice Rheims mentions him as the only "French" painter who was really part of the expressionist movement Die Brücke, although he was not necessarily conscious of it. Some short articles in the local Alsacian press and a thesis are devoted to him, but it seems that his work is still very much unrecognized in France. In Latvia, art specialists and scholars are increasingly celebratory of his work. Profoundly European by his personal history, Fiebig evolved between Post-Impressionism and Expressionism and he leaves an extensive body of work dominated by a transfigured vision of urban landscape and nature, in the context of a life broken by the two world wars.

== Notable work ==
- Selfportrait, 1912, oil on cardboard
- Portrait of Eric and Raya, 1925, oil on cardboard
- Portrait of Eric with a red coat, 1925, oil on cardboard, private collection
- Portrait of Madame Fiebig, oil on cardboard
- The Port of Naples (Italy), 1911, oil on cardboard
- Olive trees at Terracina (Italy), 1911, oil on cardboard
- Notre-Dame de Paris cathedral from the banks of the river Seine, 1925/27, oil on cardboard, private collection
- The Luxembourg garden (Paris), 1925/27, oil on cardboard, private collection
- The roofs of Paris, 1925/27, oil on cardboard, private collection
- A shelter in winter (Tännchel, Grimmelshütte), 1934/35, oil on cardboard
- The castle of Giersberg, 1934, oil on cardboard, Unterlinden Museum, Colmar, France
- Haystack, 1930/34, oil on cardboard
- Cocks, 1925, oil on cardboard
- Woods and underwood, 1934/35, oil on cardboard
- Portrait of Leon Tolstoï, woodprint, 1910, Tolstoï Museum, Moscow, Russia

== Exhibitions ==
- 2018: Neustadt Galerie, Strasbourg, France
- 2012: Les Collections du musée d'Art Moderne et Contemporain de Strasbourg (MAMCS), Fukui, Mito, Yokosuka, Matsuyama, Shizuoka, Japan
- 1997: Les Collections du musée d'Art Moderne et Contemporain de Strasbourg (MAMCS), Tokyo, Himeji, Wakayama, Kofu, Japan
- 1990: Galerie Shepherd, Exposition d'automne, New-York, USA
- 1990: Musée Municipal de Saint-Dié-des-Vosges, Rétrospective Frédéric Fiebig (1885 - 1953), Saint-Dié-des-Vosges, France
- 1937: Maison d'art alsacienne, Mulhouse, France
- 1936: Exposition des Artistes et Amis des Arts de Colmar, Colmar, France
- 1928: Riga Museum of Fine Arts, Fiebig exhibition, Riga, Latvia
- 1928: Exhibition of Latvian painters, Riga, Latvia
- 1927: Association Artiste et Artisan, Paris, France
- 1926: Galerie Georges Petit, Paris, France
- 1926: Galerie du Portique, Paris France
- 1920: First Russian exhibition of arts and crafts, Londres, United Kingdom
- 1920: Hôtel Crillon, L'art de la France, Paris, France
- 1920: Galerie Manzi-Joyant, IIe Exposition des peintres d'Armor, Paris, France
- 1920: Feuillets d'art, VIe Exposition du groupe libre, Paris, France
- 1916: Allied Artists, New-York, USA
- 1916: Association du Quartier Latin, Paris, France
- 1914: Galerie Bernheim-Jeune, Ve Exposition du groupe libre, Paris, France
- 1913: Salon des Humoristes, Paris, France
- 1912: Circulo artistico, Barcelona, Spain
- 1912: Galerie Bernheim-Jeune, Paris, France
- 1911: Alcazar d'été, Paris, France
- 1910 to 1928: Salon d'Automne, Paris, France
- 1909: Salon du Peuple, Paris, France
- 1908 to 1921: Salon des indépendants, Paris, France

== Museums ==
- National Museum of Arts, Riga, Latvia
- Talsi Regional Museum / Talsi New Museum, Latvia
- Tolstoï Museum, Moscow, Russia
- Académie Julian, Paris, France
- Unterlinden Museum, Colmar, France
- Mulhouse Museum of Fine Arts, France
- Strasbourg Museum of Fine Arts (MAMCS), France
- Bibliothèque Humaniste, Sélestat, France

== See also ==
- Académie Julian
- Expressionism
- Die Brücke

== Bibliography ==
- Abele Kristiana, Artist from Latvia on the map of late 19th and early 20th century in Europe: a glimpse into the routes, forms and results of their migration, Institute of Art History of the Latvian Academy of Art, Akademijas laukums 1–160, Riga LV-1050, Latvia, 2006
- Baziller Laurent, Histoire des fortifications de Paris ("History of Paris fortifications"), sur http://www.laurentbaziller-graphiste.fr/fortifs/histoire3.html
- Braeuner Hélène, "Les peintres et l’Alsace; autour de l’impressionnisme"("Painters and Alsace around impressionism"), La Renaissance du Livre, 2003
- Kapsreiter-Homeyer Kyra, "Des contes et des livres, aspects inédits de Frédéric Fiebig" (Tales and books, unknown aspects of the work of Frédéric Fiebig), Annuaire de la Société des Amis de la Bibliothèque Humaniste de Sélestat, no 53, p. 9-15, 2003
- Kapsreiter-Homeyer Kyra, "Frédéric Fiebig", Annuaire de la Société des Amis de la Bibliothèque Humaniste de Sélestat", no 47, p. 7-15, 1997
- Kapsreiter-Homeyer Kyra, "Frédéric Fiebig, Sa vie et son œuvre" ("Fiebig, life and art works"), PhD dissertation, Giessen University (Germany), 1992
- Kashey Robert and Kapsreiter-Homeyer Kyra, Frederic Fiebig: St. Petersburg - Paris - Alsace, 1885–1953, New York (USA), Shepherd Gallery, 1990
- Kaufmann Jean-Paul, "Courlande" ("Courland"), Fayard, 2009 (page on Frédéric Fiebig)
- Lehni Nadine, Geyer Marie-Jeanne, Walther Daniel, Frédéric Fiebig. "Des plaines de Courlande au Ried alsacien" ("From Courland to Alsace"), foreword by Maurice Rheims, 1984
- Lorentz Francis, Bergheim vu par les artistes, Société d'histoire de Bergheim, 2013 (catalogue of the exhibition: "Bergheim vu par les artistes à travers les siècles" ("Bergheim seen by artists across centuries") organized for the celebration of the 700 years of the city)
- Millerstone Guna, Frederic Fiebig 120, Catalogue des œuvres de l'artiste, pour le 120e anniversaire de sa naissance ("Catalogue of the works of the artist for the celebration of the 120th year of his birth"), 2005
- Regional Museum of Talsi, Notice on Frédéric Fiebig exhibition for his 130-year anniversary, 6 June 2015
