= Thalamas Affair =

The Thalamas Affair (French: Affaire Thalamas) was a controversy in the French education system which began in 1904 around courses on Joan of Arc taught by Amédée Thalamas.

When the Camelots du Roi, the militant youth wing of the Action Française, decided to stand against these courses at the Sorbonne in 1908, the controversy intensified. For three months, the courses in question were interrupted, numerous protests were staged in the Latin Quarter, and the student riots culminated in the occupation of the Ministry of Justice.

== Beginnings at the Lycée Condorcet ==
The Thalamas Affair got underway in November 1904. Following a class that Thalamas taught at the Lycée Condorcet, in which he proposed that Joan of Arc had been subject to auditory hallucinations (and questioned her sacred character), the nationalist deputy of Paris, Georges Berry, denounced the insult to her memory.

This course was followed by the publication of Thalamas' book titled Jeanne d’Arc, l’histoire et la légende, which explained in a manner deemed "positivist" the life of the Maid of Orleans.

Berry's intervention gave rise to arguments in the press, to protests, to a debate in the Chamber of Deputies, then to the duel between Paul Déroulède and Jean Jaurès in December 1904. In this context, an inquiry was opened by the Education Minister, Joseph Chaumié. This inquiry led to the professor's being censured for having lacked tact and moderation. Thalamas was then moved from the Lycée Condorcet to the Lycée Charlemagne.

== At the Sorbonne ==
Four years later, the Affair erupted once again when Thalamas joined the Sorbonne. Though Thalamas did not possess his Doctor of Letters, the Council of Professors of the Faculty of Letters, presided over by the dean, Alfred Croiset, had authorized him in November 1908 to hold an open weekly course on The Pedagogy of History for winter 1908-1909.

The Camelots du Roi, led by Maxime Real del Sarte, decided from then to interrupt the course each Wednesday, sometimes violently; this led to the public caning of Thalamas by Lucien Lacour and other Camelots du Roi.
