= Lucílio de Albuquerque =

Brazilian painter, designer and art professor

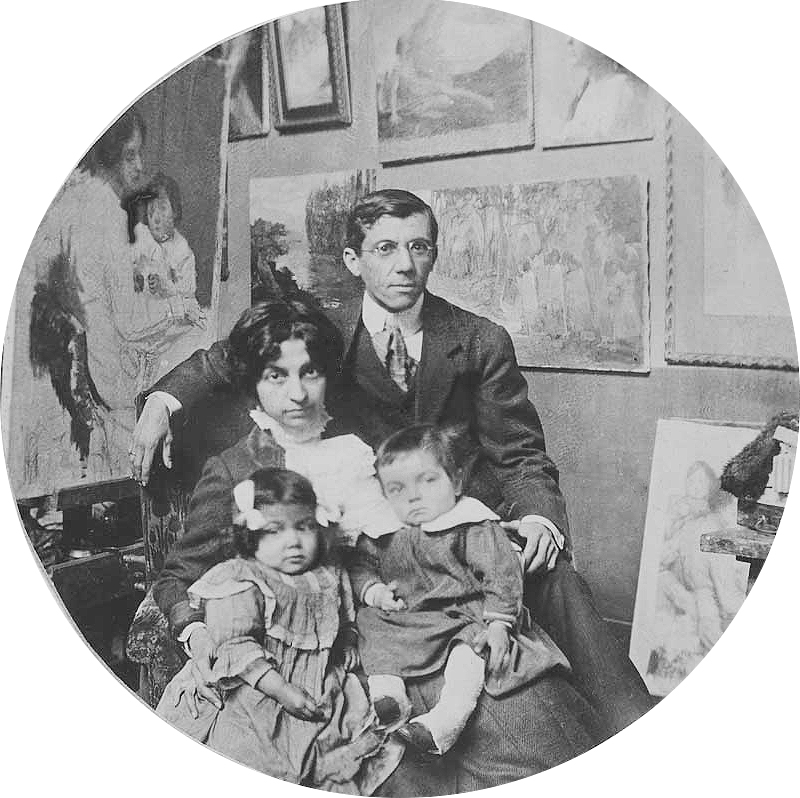
- Lucílio and his wife Georgina
- Born: May 9, 1877; Barras, Empire of Brazil
- Died: April 19, 1939 (aged 61); Rio de Janeiro
- Spouse: Georgina de Albuquerque

Lucílio de Albuquerque (9 May 1877 – 19 April 1939) was a Brazilian painter, designer and art professor. He is the Patron of the 3rd chair of the Brazilian Academy of Fine Arts.

== Biography ==
His father was a magistrate. After a brief period of studying law at the Faculdade de Direito da Universidade de São Paulo, he enrolled at the Escola Nacional de Belas Artes (ENBA), where he studied under João Zeferino da Costa, Rodolfo Amoedo and Henrique Bernardelli.

In 1906, his painting "Anchieta escrevendo o poema à Virgem" (Anchieta Writing the Poem to the Virgin) won him ENBA's "Travel Award". Soon after, he and his new bride Georgina (a classmate) left for France, where they remained for five years. While there, he attended the Académie Julian, where he studied with Marcel Baschet, Henri Royer and Jean-Paul Laurens. He also worked in the studios of Eugène Grasset and had a small exhibition at the Salon.

Upon their return to Brazil in 1911, they held joint exhibitions at ENBA, where Lucílio became a Professor of Figure Drawing and was appointed to a chair in 1916. Over the next decade, he received many awards at the "Exposições Gerais de Belas Artes". He became the Director of ENBA in 1937, but resigned a year later due to poor health.

Best known for his portraits and landscapes, he also designed the stained-glass windows for the Brazilian Pavilion at the Turin International and did decorative paintings for the Pedro Ernesto Palace.

After his death, Georgina turned their home in Laranjeiras into the "Museu Lucílio de Albuquerque".

== Gallery ==
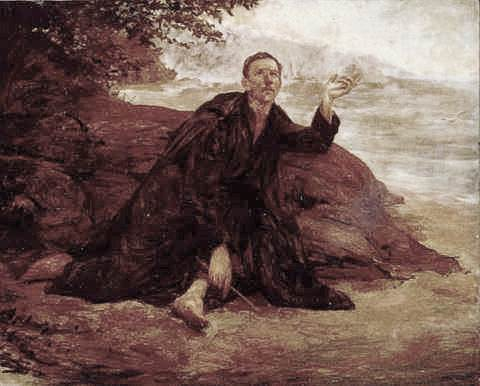
Anchieta writing the Poem to the Virgin (1906)

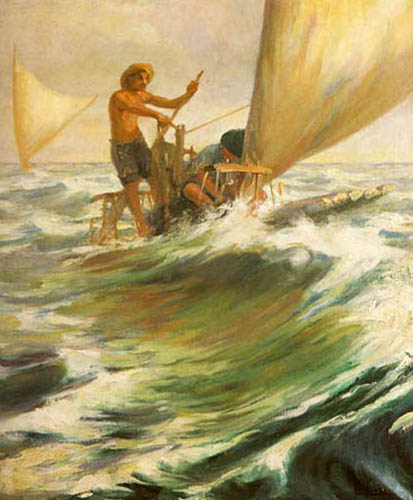
The Raft (1920)
