= Angélique Arnaud =

French writer

Angélique Arnaud (1797, Gannat – 1884) was a French novelist and feminist writer.

Arnaud travelled to Paris from the provinces, and involved herself in feminist circles around Henri de Saint-Simon. As well as her novels, she wrote articles and polemical pamphlets. She studied with François Delsarte, and wrote a critical study of him.

== Biography ==
In 1833, she began to write articles in newspapers on the theme of liberal and republican causes. The salary she earned allowed her to hire a tutor for her children and thus to have time to write. She defended feminism, socialism and saint-simonianism.

Her progressive novels were very popular among the female groups. George Sand described her writing as the "thousand delightful sentiments, the thousand graceful lines of poetry in her analyses and descriptions."

She wrote for publications such as, Le Monde maçonnique and was active in the Society for the Advancement of Women.

Maria Deraismes wrote at Arnauds death that she was "the apostle of all the major demands...There was no humanitarian and generous movement in this century in which Arnaud was not involved".

== Selected works ==
- La Comtesse de Sergy, 1838
- Clémence, 1841
- Une tendre dévote, 1874
- La Cousine Adèle, 1879
- François Delsarte; Ses découvertes en esthétique, sa science, sa méthode,
