= University of Paris Faculty of Humanities =

French educational institution, 1808–1970

Faculty of Humanities of Paris The Sorbonne
- Faculté des Lettres de Paris; La Sorbonne
- Former names: Faculté des Arts (1200–1793); Faculté des Lettres (1808–1896); Faculté des Lettres et Sciences Humaines (1896–1971)
- Type: Public
- Active: 1200; 826 years ago–1971
- Parent institution: University of Paris (1896–1971)
- Dean: Raymond Las Vergnas (last, 1968–1971)
- Location: Paris, France
- Campus: Urban
- Language: French, English
- Current successors: Sorbonne University (in the same building); Panthéon-Sorbonne University; Paris Cité University; Sorbonne Nouvelle University

The Faculty of Humanities of Paris (in French: Faculté des Lettres de Paris [fakylte de lɛtʁ də paʁi]), commonly known as the "Sorbonne", was one of the four faculties of the University of Paris, refounded in 1896, and an independent entity from 1808 to 1896, based in the Sorbonne building, in Paris. It was the heir to the Faculty of Arts of the old University of Paris, founded around 1200, and to the College of Sorbonne, founded in 1270.

It was set up by the imperial decree regarding the University of France on 17 March 1808. It partly succeeded the Faculty of Arts of the former University of Paris (1150–1793). In 1896, it was joined to four other faculties in Paris to form the new University of Paris. It was dissolved in 1970, at the same time as the University of Paris. Sorbonne University and the Paris 1 Panthéon-Sorbonne University are its main successors today.

== History ==
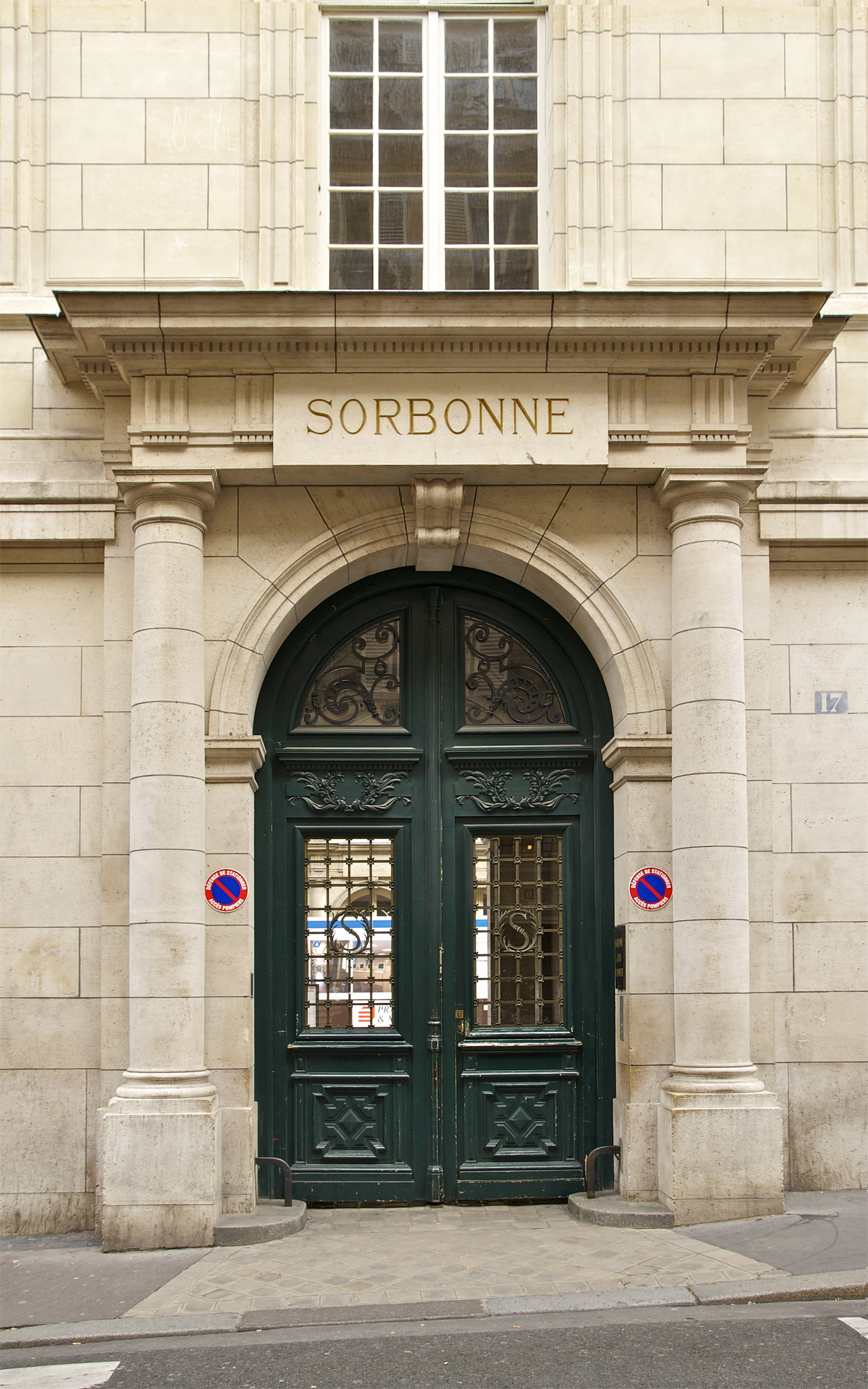
A side entrance with a sign reading "Sorbonne"

The Faculty of Humanities was created by the decree of 17 March 1808 on the organisation of the Imperial University of France. Under the Bourbon Restoration, the faculty welcomed an average of 1,000 to 1,500 students a year, rising to 2,000 under the July Monarchy. But the number of teaching staff remained limited: between 1809 and 1878, only 51 professors taught at the Faculty of Humanities.

In 1896, the University of Paris, also known as the New University of Paris, was re-created as an umbrella organisation for the Faculty of Science, the Faculty of Arts, the Faculty of Law, the Faculty of Medicine, the Faculty of Protestant Theology and the École Supérieure de Pharmacie de Paris. The faculty was renamed the Faculty of Arts and Humanities until 1971.

Following the loi Faure of 8 October 1970, it was divided into the universities Paris-I (Panthéon-Sorbonne University), Paris-III (Sorbonne Nouvelle University), Paris-IV (Paris-Sorbonne University), Paris-V (Paris-Descartes University) and Paris-VII (Paris-Diderot University) in 1970.

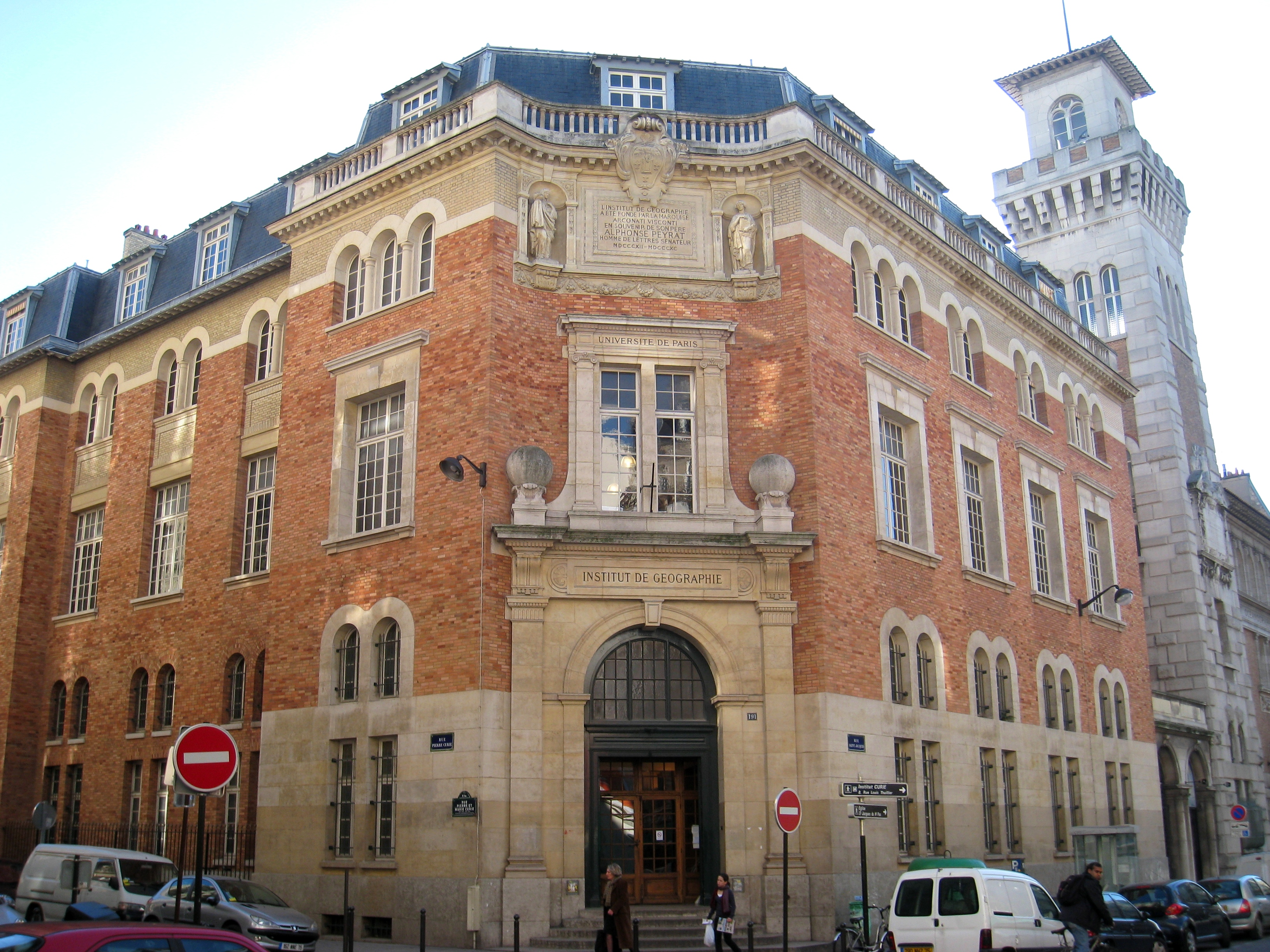
The Institut de Géographie within the faculty.

== Teaching ==
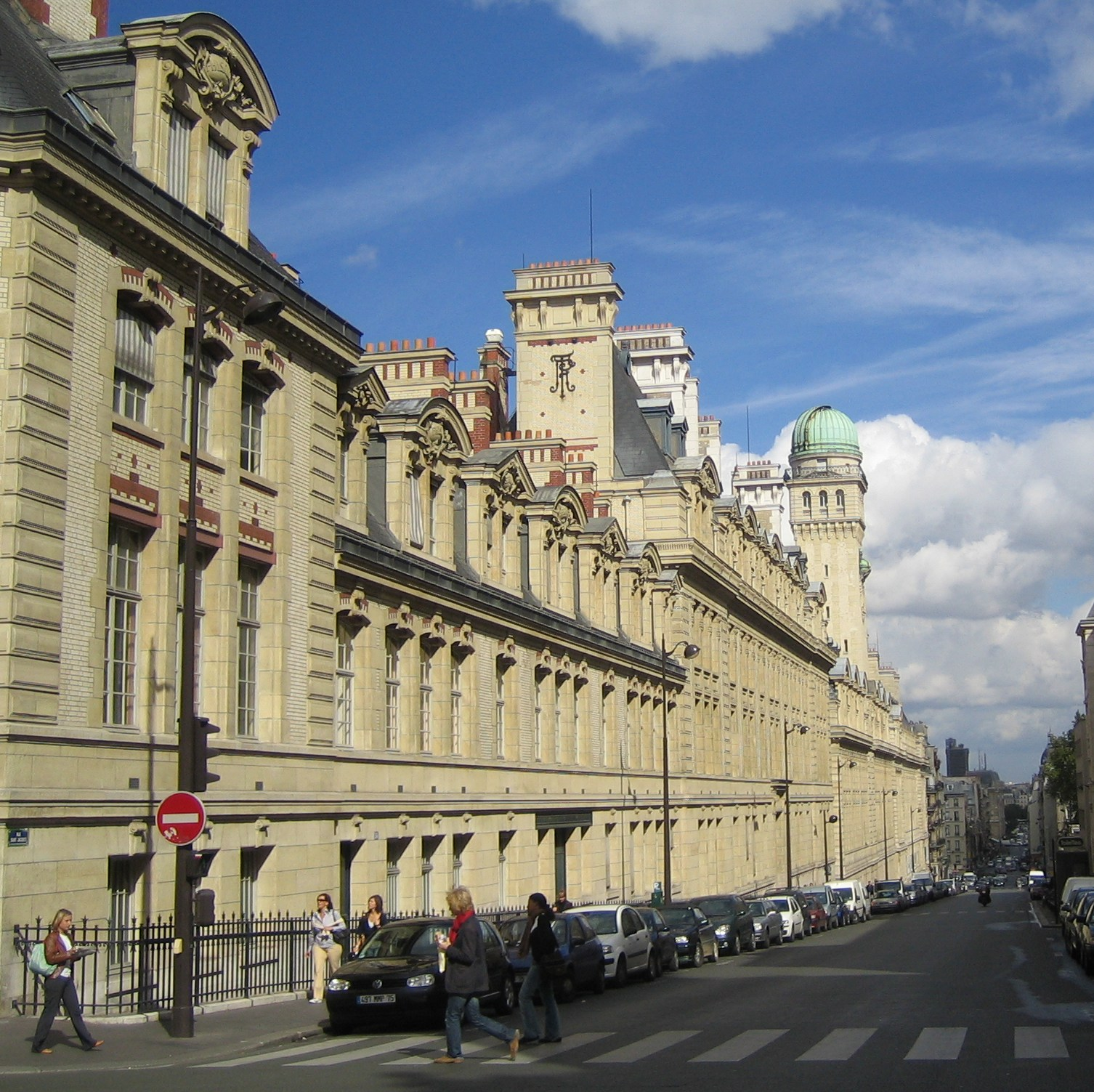
The Sorbonne, seat of the faculty.

Its first statutes were put in place by the university's council on 16 February 1810. Each professor taught two 90-minute lessons each week. The university year began in December and lasted eight months. The faculty ran nine courses:

- ancient Greek literature
- Latin prose or 'éloquence latine'
- Latin poetry
- French prose or 'éloquence française'
- French poetry
- philosophy
- history of philosophy
- ancient and modern history
- ancient and modern geography

== Deans ==
- Pierre-Paul Royer-Collard, philosopher
- Jean-Denis Barbié du Bocage (1815–1825), geographer
- Victor Le Clerc (1832–1865), Latinist
- Henri Patin (1865–1876), Latinist
- Henri Wallon (1876–1881), historian
- Auguste Himly (1881–1891), historian
- Ernest Lavisse (1903–...), historian
- Alfred Croiset (1845–1923), Hellenist
- Ferdinand Brunot (1919–1928),
- Henri Delacroix (1928–...), philosopher
- André Aymard, historian
- André Cholley, geographer
- Georges Davy (...-1955), philosopher
- Pierre Renouvin (1955–1958), historian
- Marcel Durry, Latinist
- Raymond Las Vergnas, scholar of the English language, final dean of the faculté (1968–1971), then first president of Université Sorbonne Nouvelle - Paris 3
