= Georgina de Albuquerque =

Brazilian Impressionist painter and teacher

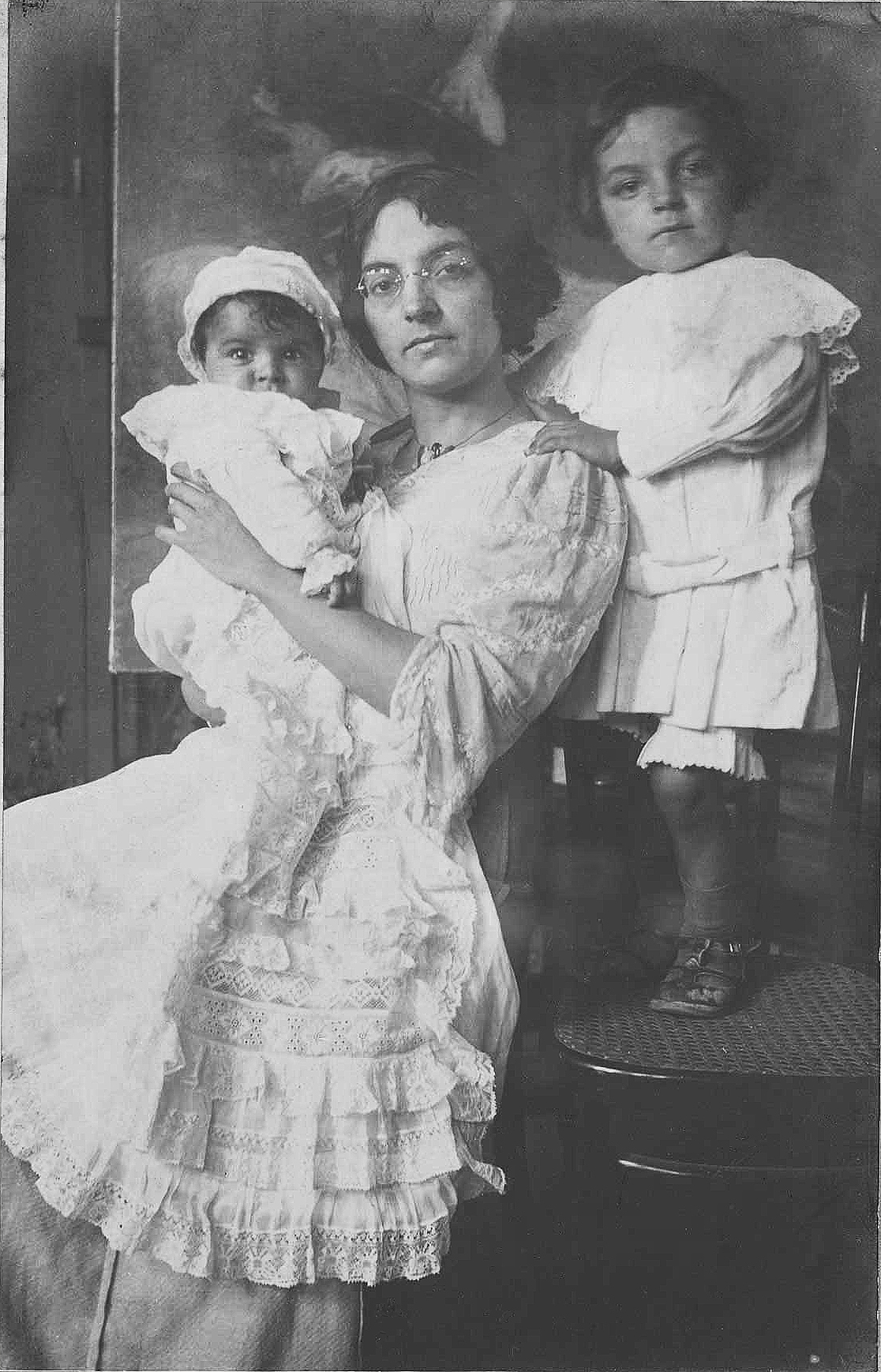
- Georgina de Albuquerque, photographed by M. Nogueira da Silva
- Born: Georgina de Moura Andrade; February 4, 1885; Taubaté, São Paulo, Empire of Brazil
- Died: August 29, 1962 (aged 77); Rio de Janeiro, Guanabara, Brazil
- Movement: Impressionism
- Spouse: Lucílio de Albuquerque

Georgina de Albuquerque (February 4, 1885 – August 29, 1962) was a Brazilian Impressionist painter and teacher. She was known for her interest in female subjects. Her husband Lucílio was a noted painter.

== Early life ==
De Albuquerque was born Georgina de Moura Andrade on February 4, 1885, in Taubaté, São Paulo. She began her studies in painting at the age of 15 in 1900 in her native Taubaté. She was tutored in her own home by the Italian painter Rosalbino Santoro, who taught her the basic principles of painting, such as the laws of perspective and the techniques of mixing paint.

== Training ==
De Albuquerque moved to Rio de Janeiro in 1904 at the age of 19, where she enrolled at the Escola Nacional de Belas Artes (National School of Fine Arts), studying under Henrique Bernardelli. She moved to Paris in 1906, after marrying the painter Lucílio de Albuquerque. In Paris she attended the École Nationale Supérieure des Beaux-Arts and the Académie Julian, where she was a student of Henri Royer.

== Career ==
In 1911 Georgina de Albuquerque returned to Brazil and exhibited her work in São Paulo. From then on she participated regularly in the General Exhibition of Fine Arts.

In 1927 Georgina de Albuquerque became a professor at the Escola Nacional de Belas Artes in Rio de Janeiro, where she taught artistic design. In 1935 she began teaching a course in decorative arts at the Institute of Arts of the University of the Federal District. In 1940 she founded the Museu Lucílio de Albuquerque at her home in the neighbourhood of Laranjeiras. She established a pioneering course in drawing and painting for children. Between 1952 and 1954 she held the post of Director at the Escola Nacional de Belas Artes.

== Death ==
Georgina de Albuquerque died on August 29, 1962, in Rio de Janeiro at the age of 77.

== Gallery ==
Lady, by Georgina de Albuquerque, 1906

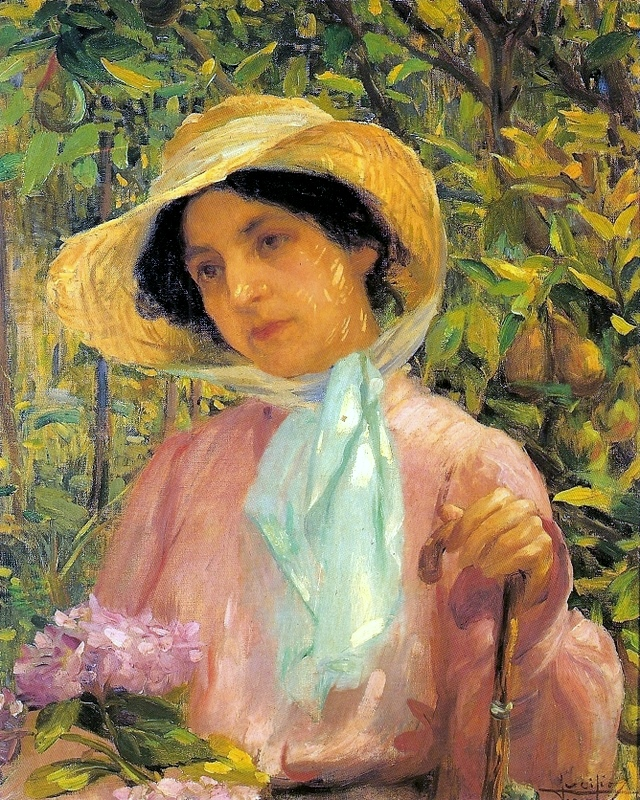
Portrait of Georgina de Albuquerque by Lucílio de Albuquerque, 1907

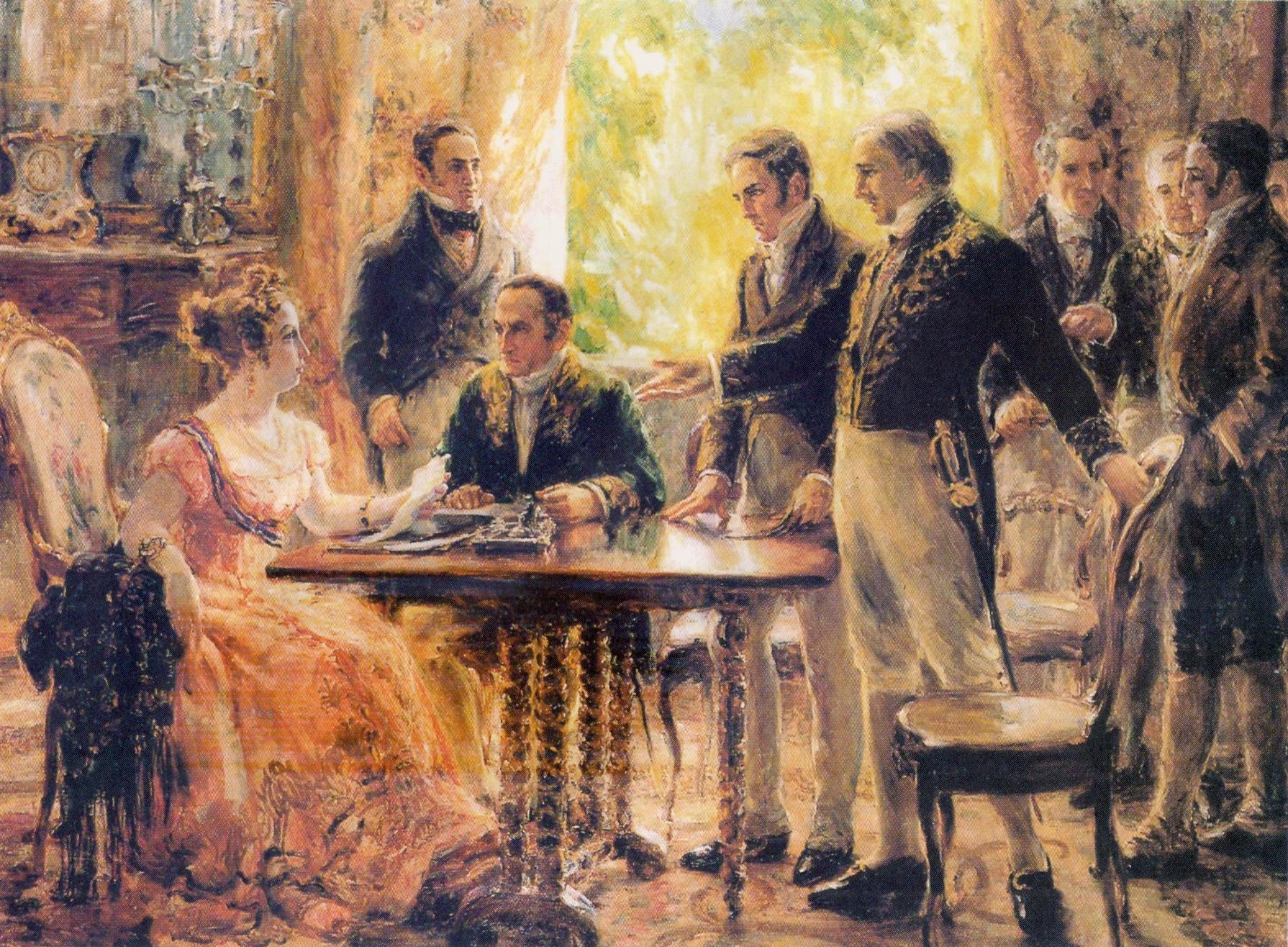
Georgina de Albuquerque, 1922, Sessão do Conselho de Estado, oil on canvas, National Historical Museum (Brazil), Rio de Janeiro
