= Alfred Croiset =

French classical scholar (1845–1923)

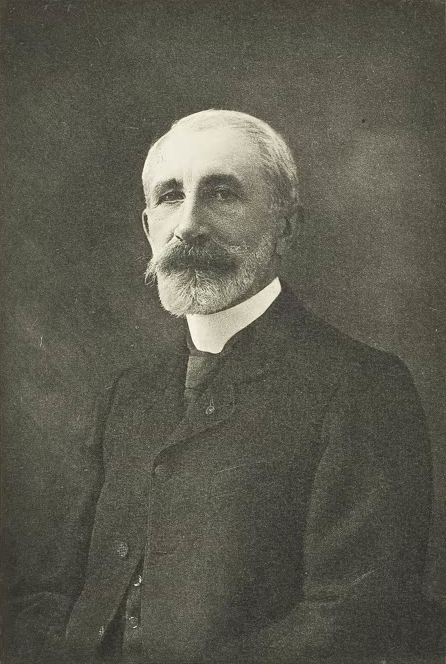
- Born: Marie Joseph Alfred Croiset; 5 January 1845; Paris, France
- Died: 7 June 1923 (aged 78); Paris, France
- Awards: Legion of Honor - Grand Officer

Academic background
- Education: École normale supérieure; University of Paris
- Thesis: De personis apud Aristophanem (1873)

Academic work
- Notable students: Gustave Glotz
- Notable works: Histoire de la littérature grecque (1887–1899)

Marie Joseph Alfred Croiset (5 January 1845 – 7 June 1923) was a French classical philologist.

== Biography ==
Born in Paris, Alfred Croiset, son of the teacher and classical philologist (François) Paul Croiset (1814-1897), attended the Lycée Charlemagne from 1855 to 1859 and then until 1864 the Lycée Louis-le-Grand in Paris. His brother Maurice (1846–1935), who was one year younger, also became an important classical philologist, and the brothers often worked together.

Alfred Croiset began studying classical philology at the École normale supérieure in 1864, which he graduated in 1867. In the following ten years he taught at various lycées in France (1867 Chambéry, 1868 Nevers, 1871 Montauban, 1871 Collège Stanislas in Paris, 1874 Lycée Charlemagne in Paris). This activity was only interrupted twice, first in 1870 during his mobilization for the Franco-Prussian War, then again in 1873 during his doctorate with the thesis Xénophon, son caractère et son talent at the Sorbonne.

In 1877 he moved to the Sorbonne as maître de conférences, where he completed his thesis De personis apud Aristophanem in 1880, and in 1885 he became a professor there. In 1886 he became a member of the Académie des inscriptions et belles-lettres. From 1898 to 1919 he was dean of the Faculté des lettres. After leaving the position, he received the title of dean hc. He was on leave and in 1921 retired. He died in Paris in 1923.

In 1887 he became a Knight, in 1897 an Officer, in 1901 a Commander, and in 1913 a Grand Officer of the Legion of Honor.

Croiset devoted himself mainly to Greek literature. His critical edition of Plato's Dialogues, co- edited with Louis Bodin, is still used today. In addition, he dealt with Pindar, Thucydides as well as Xenophon and Aristophanes. With his brother he wrote a widely read Greek literary history, which also became the basis of a manual. Together with his writings on democracy education, it was particularly well received and widely used in the United States. His efforts to reform teaching as well as his many years of work as dean led to opposition with anti-modernist circles, who accused him of the "scientization" and "Germanization" of the humanities. Henri Massis was one of the critics from student circles. Croiset's students included Paul Mazon, Auguste Diès, and Gustave Glotz.

== Selected works ==
- De personis apud Aristophanem. Dissertation Paris 1873 (online).
- With Maurice Croiset: Histoire de la littérature grecque. 5 vols, Paris 1887–1899
  - Volume 1, 1887, online, Volume 2, 1890, online, Volume 3, 1891, online, Volume 4, 1895, online, Volume 5, 1899, online
- La poésie de Pindare et les lois du lyrisme grec. Paris 1880 (online).
  - English translation: An abridged history of Greek literature, Macmillan 1904 (online).
- Enseignement Et Démocratie: Leçons Professées À l'École Des Hautes Études Sociales, Félix Alcan, 1905 (collective work with Émile Devinat and other authors).
- Les démocraties antiques. Paris 1909 (online).
