= Thérèse Wartel =

French pianist, music educator, composer and critic (1814-1865)

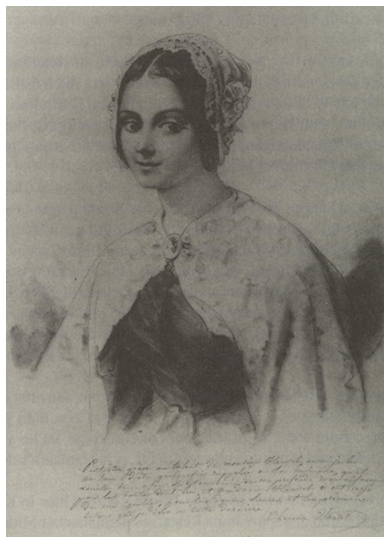
Therese Wartel

Atala Thérèse Annette Wartel, née Adrien (2 July 1814 – 6 November 1865), was a French pianist, music educator, composer and critic.

== Biography ==
Born in Paris, Thérèse Wartel was the daughter of the opera singer Martin-Joseph Adrien or Andrien (1767–1822) and the Baroness Gabrielle Constance de Philippy de Bucelly d'Estrées (1782–1854). She was also the sister of the piano virtuoso Rosine-Charlotte DelSarte who was the wife of the renowned French music and movement teacher Francois DelSarte (1811–1871).

She studied music at the Conservatoire, became an accompanist, and from 1831–38 taught as a professor at the Conservatoire. In 1838, she was the first female soloist ever admitted to the Orchestre de la Société des Concerts du Conservatoire.

In 1833, she married the tenor Pierre-François Wartel (1806–1882) and had a son, Émile, who performed for many years at the Théâtre-Lyrique and later established a vocal school of his own.

She died in Paris aged 51.

== Works ==
Wartel composed caprices, fantasies, études, ballads and romances. Selected compositions include:

- Lessons on the Pianoforte Sonatas of Beethoven
- Souvenirs of the Huguenots, fantaisie, Leipzig
- Caprice
- Andante, autograph, 1843
- Six Études de salon pour piano, Op. 10, Paris (1850)
- Andante, Op. 11 (1851)

Wartel also published a number of articles and letters on musical subjects, e.g.

- "Künstler-Portraits aus der Londoner musikalischen Saison 1859", in: Süddeutsche Musik-Zeitung, 17 October 1859, P. 165.
- Leçons écrites sur les sonates pour piano seul de L. van Beethoven, Paris 1865.
