= Léonie Humbert-Vignot =

French painter (1878–1960)

- Born: 1878; Lyon
- Died: 1960 (aged 81–82); Lyon

Léonie Humbert-Vignot (French: [leɔni ɛ̃bɛʁ viɲo]; 1878 – 1960) was a French painter.

== Life ==
Humbert-Vignot was born in Lyon in 1878. She was a student of Alexandre François Bonnardel at the École nationale des beaux-arts de Lyon.

From 1896 she exhibited at the Salon in Lyons. She was a student of Marie Laforge, Marcel Baschet, Henri Royer and Édouard Toudouze at the Académie Julian.

Humbert-Vignot died in Lyon in 1960.
