= François Delsarte =

French singer, orator, and coach (1811–1871)

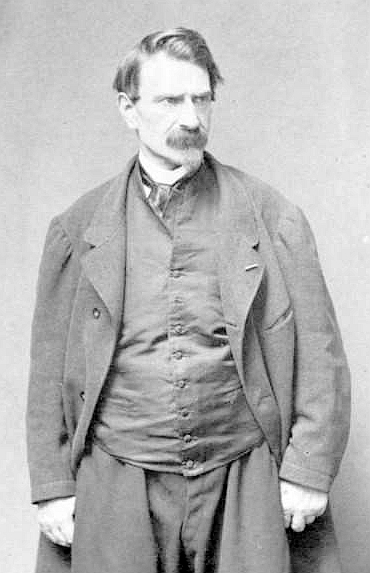
François Delsarte (1864)

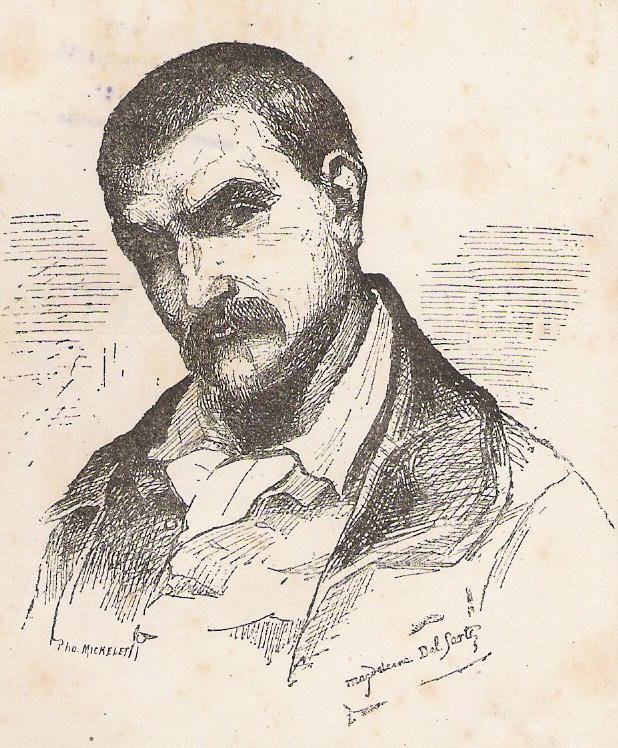
François Delsarte (Madeleine Delsarte)

François Alexandre Nicolas Chéri Delsarte (French pronunciation: [fʁɑ̃swa alɛksɑ̃dʁ nikɔla ʃeʁi dɛlsaʁt]; 19 November 1811 – 20 July 1871) was a French singer, orator, and coach. Though he achieved some success as a composer, he is chiefly known as a teacher in singing and declamation (oratory).

== Applied aesthetics ==
Delsarte was born in Solesmes, Nord. He became a pupil at the Paris Conservatory, was for a time a tenor in the Opéra Comique, and composed a few songs. While studying singing at the Conservatoire, he became unsatisfied with what he felt were arbitrary methods for teaching acting. He began to study how humans moved, behaved and responded to various emotional and real-life situations. By observing people in real life and in public places of all kinds, he discovered certain patterns of expression, eventually called the Science of Applied Aesthetics. This consisted of a thorough examination of voice, breath, movement dynamics, encompassing all of the expressive elements of the human body. His hope was to develop an exact science of the physical expression of emotions, but he died before he had achieved his goals.

== Delsarte System ==
Delsarte coached preachers, painters, singers, composers, orators and actors in the bodily expression of emotions. His goal was to help clients connect their inner emotional experience with the use of gesture. Delsarte categorized ideas related to how emotions are expressed physically in the body into various rules, ‘laws’ or ‘principles.’ These laws were organized by Delsarte in charts and diagrams. Delsarte did not teach systematically but rather through inspiration of the moment, and left behind no publications on his lessons. In America, Delsarte's theories were developed into what became known as the (American) Delsarte System.

== Influence and impact ==
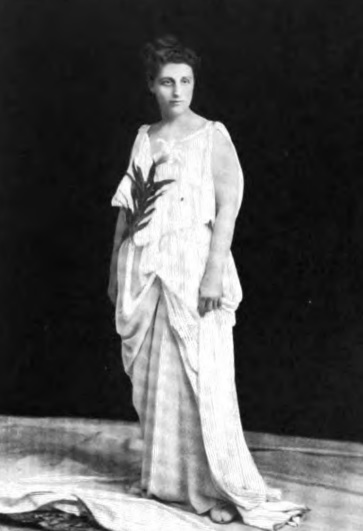
Genevieve Stebbins posing (in 1902). Her performances ultimately helped Delsarte's ideas permeate modern dance.

Delsarte is believed to have played an important role in the musical evolution of nineteenth-century France, and his ideas were influential to the physical culture movement in the late 19th century in America. Delsarte intended his work for the performing arts, including the theatre, and his many students (who also included orators and teachers) are known or believed to have included Sarah Bernhardt, Victor Cousin, Théophile Gautier, Angélique Arnaud, Delphine de Girardin, Henri Lasserre, Alphonse de Lamartine, Alexandre Dumas, Émilie Madeleine Brohan, Benoît-Constant Coquelin, Madame Pasca, Père Hyacinthe, Henri-Dominique Lacordaire, Jacques-Marie-Louis Monsabré, Thomas-Étienne Hamel, Edgar Degas, Claude Ferdinand Gaillard, Victor Orsel, Ary Scheffer, Camille Saint-Saëns, Charles Gounod, and Richard Wagner.

Delsarte never wrote a text explaining his method, and neither did his only protégé, the American actor Steele MacKaye, who brought his teacher's theories to America in lecture demonstrations he delivered in New York and Boston in 1871. However, MacKaye's student Genevieve Stebbins continued in their footsteps by developing a system of 'harmonic gymnastics', and in 1886 she published a book building on the foundation of Delsarte's theories titled The Delsarte System of Expression, which became a major success with six editions (as well as numerous copycat publications). Stebbins also lectured extensively on Delsarte's theories, and displayed them (in conjunction with harmonic gymnastics) by statue-posing and performing so-called 'pantomimes' illustrating a poem, story or concept, thereby bringing Delsarte's work closer to dance. According to a contemporary description, Stebbins's statue poses, spiralling from head to toe, would "flow gracefully onward from the simple to complex... commencing with a simple attitude, and continuing with a slow, rhythmic motion of every portion of the body." Although she did not describe herself as a dancer, from 1890 at the latest she started to perform actual dances as well as poses.

There was a renewed interest in Delsartism in the 1890s in Europe. The principles of Delsarte were incorporated into expressionist dance and modern dance more generally through the influence of Isadora Duncan (Note: Duncan's official denial of any familiarity with Desarte's work failed to convince her biographers as plausible: for example, in an interview of 1898 she extolled his mastery of the principles of flexibility and bodily lightness, and her aesthetic pronouncements on the "inner man" in relation to the body closely echoed Delsarte's own.) and the Denishawn school of Ruth St. Denis and Ted Shawn. While St. Denis claimed a performance by Stebbins inspired her to dance, Shawn consciously embodied the Delsarte System in his work (and his book Every Little Movement (1954) is a key English-language text on the subject). As well as permeating the entire modern-dance movement in America, Delsartian influence may also be felt in German Tanztheater, through the work of Rudolf Laban (Note: Laban is said to have acknowledged the stimulus of Delsarte's work and appears to have studied what he loosely referred to as "Delsarte mime" while in Paris between 1900 and 1908; the evolution of his own movement theory seems to reflect familiarity with Delsartian ideas.) and Mary Wigman.

Ironically, it was the great success of the Delsarte System that was also its undoing. By the 1890s, it was being taught everywhere, and not always in accordance with the emotional basis that Delsarte originally had in mind. No certification was needed to teach a course with the name Delsarte attached, and the study regressed into empty posing with little emotional truth behind it. Stephen Wangh concludes, "it led others into stereotyped and melodramatic gesticulation, devoid of the very heart that Delsarte had sought to restore."

== Family ==
Delsarte was the uncle of composer Georges Bizet, the father of painter Marie Real del Sarte, and the grandfather of painter Thérèse Geraldy and sculptor Maxime Real del Sarte.
