= Émile Wartel =

French opera singer

Louis Émile Wartel (31 March 1834, Paris – 5 May 1907, Paris) was an opera singer and teacher active in Paris. He was the son of the musicians François Wartel and Thérèse Wartel.

== Life and career ==
Wartel was an established singer at the Théâtre Lyrique in Paris from 1858 until 1868, creating many baritone roles in new operas premiered there.

His repertoire was:

1858

- Valère in Le médecin malgré lui (premiere)
- Bartholo in Les noces de Figaro
- Lysandre in L'agneau de Chloé (premiere)
- Gambara in Le harpe d'or (premiere)

1859

- Omar in Abou Hassan
- l’Agent de Cardinal Mazarin in Les petits violons du roi (premiere)

1860

- le Docteur Sangrado in Gil Blas (premiere)
- le Marquis de Panillac in Les valets de Gascogne (premiere)
- Père Richard in L'auberge des Ardennes (premiere)
- Monsieur Oronte in Crispin, rival de son maitre (premiere)
- le Capitaine Barbagallo in Les pêcheurs de Catane (premiere)

1861

- Magnus and Astaroth in Astaroth (premiere)
- Monsieur d’Assonvilliers in Madame Grégoire (premiere)
- Badroulboudour in Les deux cadis (premiere)
- Kaloum in La statue (premiere)
- le Marquis in Le café du roi
- Placidus in La nuit aux gondoles (premiere)
- Don Gregorio in Le tête enchantée (premiere)

1862

- Utobal in Joseph
- l'Ogre de la forêt in La chatte merveilleuse (premiere)

1863

- Don Armado in Peines d'amours perdues
- Sparafucile in Rigoletto

1864

- Ambroise in Mireille (premiere)
- Le baron in Violetta
- Le docteur in Le cousin Babylas (premiere)

1865

- Candaule in Le roi Candaule (premiere)
- Le bourgmestre in Lisbeth ou la Cinquantaine
- Lord Tristan in Martha

1866

- Ford in Les joyeuses commères de Windsor
- Van Daff in Les dragées de Suzette (premiere)

1867

- le Duc de Vérone in Roméo et Juliette (premiere)
- Simon Glover in La jolie fille de Perth (premiere)

1868

- Pandolphe in L'irato
- Toby in Le brasseur de Preston
