= Thérèse Geraldy =

French painter

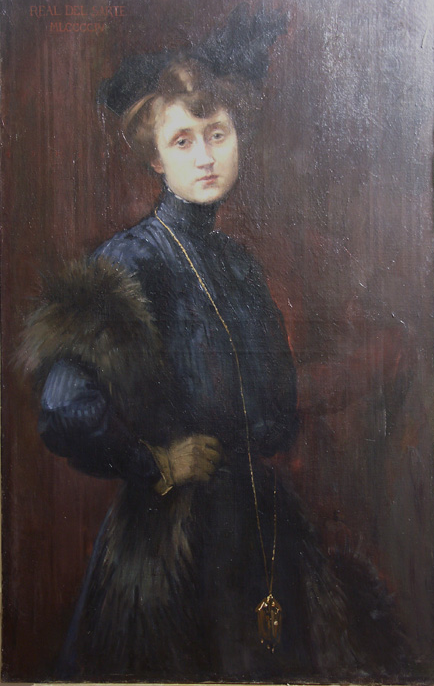
- Thérèse Geraldy, portrait painted in 1904 by her aunt Marie Magdeleine Real del Sarte
- Born: 18 June 1884; Paris
- Died: 31 July 1965 (aged 81); Paris

Thérèse-Marie-Rosine Geraldy (18 June 1884 – 31 July 1965) was a French portrait artist.

== Life ==
Born at Paris, Geraldy was the daughter of Louis Paul Lucien Geraldy, an artist and Marie-Anne-Elizabeth Delsarte, a sculptor, medalist and drawing teacher, and was one of four children. She was a granddaughter of the musician François Delsarte, a cousin of the sculptor Maxime Real del Sarte, and related to the composer Georges Bizet. Educated at the Académie Julian by Marcel Baschet and Henri Royer, she was also a pupil of her aunt Marie Magdeleine Real del Sarte. As a painter, she specialized in portraiture.

In 1906 the Société des Artistes Français gave Geraldy an honourable mention, as reported in Le Figaro and Le Radical on 30 May 1906. On 30 April 1908 Comœdia warmly reviewed her portrait of the politician Paul Escudier.

In 1910 she was awarded the Prix Galimard-Jaubert, worth the substantial sum of 4,800 Francs payable over four years. In 1912 she painted Lord de Saumarez, of Guernsey. Other subjects included Helen Templeton Pogue, the Duchess of Nemours, and the Countess Rosario Schiffner de Larrechea de Zubov.

In 1939 she was appointed to the Legion of Honour, the jewel of which was bestowed on her by her old painting master Marcel Baschet, commander of the Order. She died at Paris on 31 July 1965.

== Exhibitions ==
- 1907 at Salon of the Société des Artistes Français
- 1908 at Salon of the Société des Artistes Français
- 1909 at Salon of the Société des Artistes Français
- 1910 at Salon of the Société des Artistes Français, showing two portraits for which the Taylor Foundation awarded her the Prix Galimard-Jaubert
- 1925 at Salon of the Société des Artistes Français
- 1933 at Salon of the Société des Artistes Français, portrait of Georges Krier
- 1937 at Exposition internationale (Silver medallist)
