= Gustave Glotz =

French historian

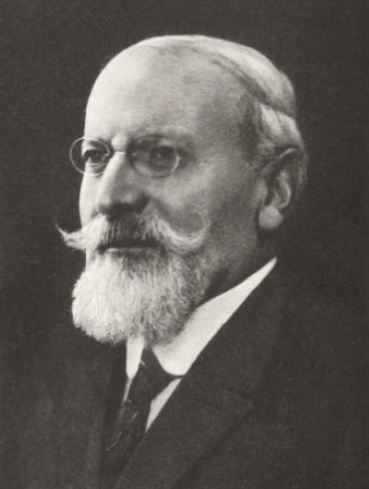

Gustave Glotz (17 February 1862, Haguenau, Bas-Rhin – 16 April 1935, Paris) was a French historian of ancient Greece. He was a supporter of the theory that history never follows a simple, logical course.

Glotz studied at the École normale supérieure, and in 1885 received the agrégation d'histoire, a competitive examination in France designed to recruit teachers for secondary school positions. In 1907, he succeeded Paul Guiraud as professor of Greek history at the Sorbonne. In 1920, he became a member of the Académie des inscriptions et belles-lettres, and was named its president in 1928. His work on the economic history of Greece and the ancient Greek city is particularly noted. Le travail dans la Grèce ancienne (1920) is well known in the English translation Ancient Greece at Work (1926), as is his Cité Grecque (1928) as The Greek City and Its Institutions (1930).

According to Glotz, the first humans to arrive in Greece were semi-nomadic shepherds from the Balkans. Their society was based on a patriarchal clan, whose members were all descendant from the same ancestor and all worshiped the same deity. Unions between several clans resulted in "fraternités", or armed groups. When faced with important undertakings, these groups would come together into a small number of tribes which were entirely independent in terms of religious, political, and militaristic views but which all recognized a supreme king, their chief.

Glotz also distinguished between two phases of the ancient Greek city: an archaic era (1500-1400 BCE), corresponding to the Minoan age, with the formation in Greece of the first urban centers, and a Doric age, roughly viewed as a Hellenic middle age, characterized by chaos and invasions. Only fortified cities and acropolises, capable of controlling the surrounding regions, survived this period.

Glotz gives his name to the Centre Gustave Glotz, a group of researchers under the auspices of the Institut national d’histoire de l’art, the CNRS, and the Université Paris 1 Panthéon-Sorbonne.
