= Marie Magdeleine Real del Sarte =

French painter

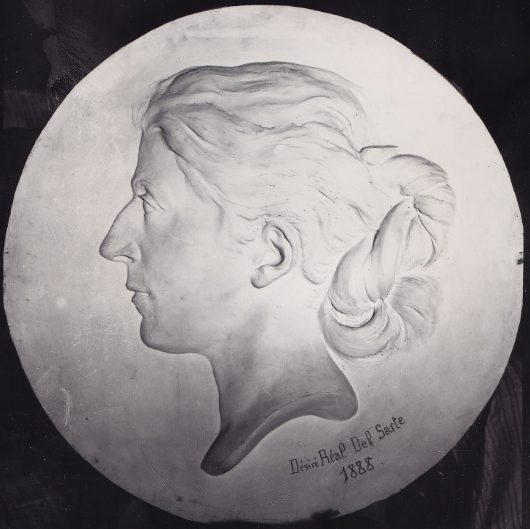
- Portrait of Real del Sarte by her husband
- Born: 23 June 1853; Paris, France
- Died: 16 March 1927 (aged 73); Paris, France
- Known for: Painting
- Spouse: Louis Désiré Réal (m. 1887)
- Children: Maxime Real del Sarte

Marie Magdeleine Real del Sarte or Real del Sarte (23 June 1853 – 16 March 1927) was a French painter and model.

Real del Sarte was born in Paris as the daughter of singer and singing teacher François Delsarte and singing teacher Rosine Charlotte Andrien (1817-1891). She attended the Académie Julian from 1874 where she was taught by Gustave Boulanger, Tony Robert-Fleury and Jules Lefebvre. She is the blond girl in the middle of Marie Bashkirtseff's 1881 painting In the Studio. She became a teacher there while still attending classes and married her cousin, the sculptor Louis Désiré Réal on 1 March 1887. After that she began signing her works Real del Sarte. Her son Maxime Real del Sarte became a sculptor. Her painting Do You Want to Model? was one of the works featured in Women Painters of the World by Walter Shaw Sparrow (1905); one of the first books that treated 19th-century female artists as worthy of serious attention. Her niece Thérèse Geraldy was her pupil.

Sarte died in Paris.

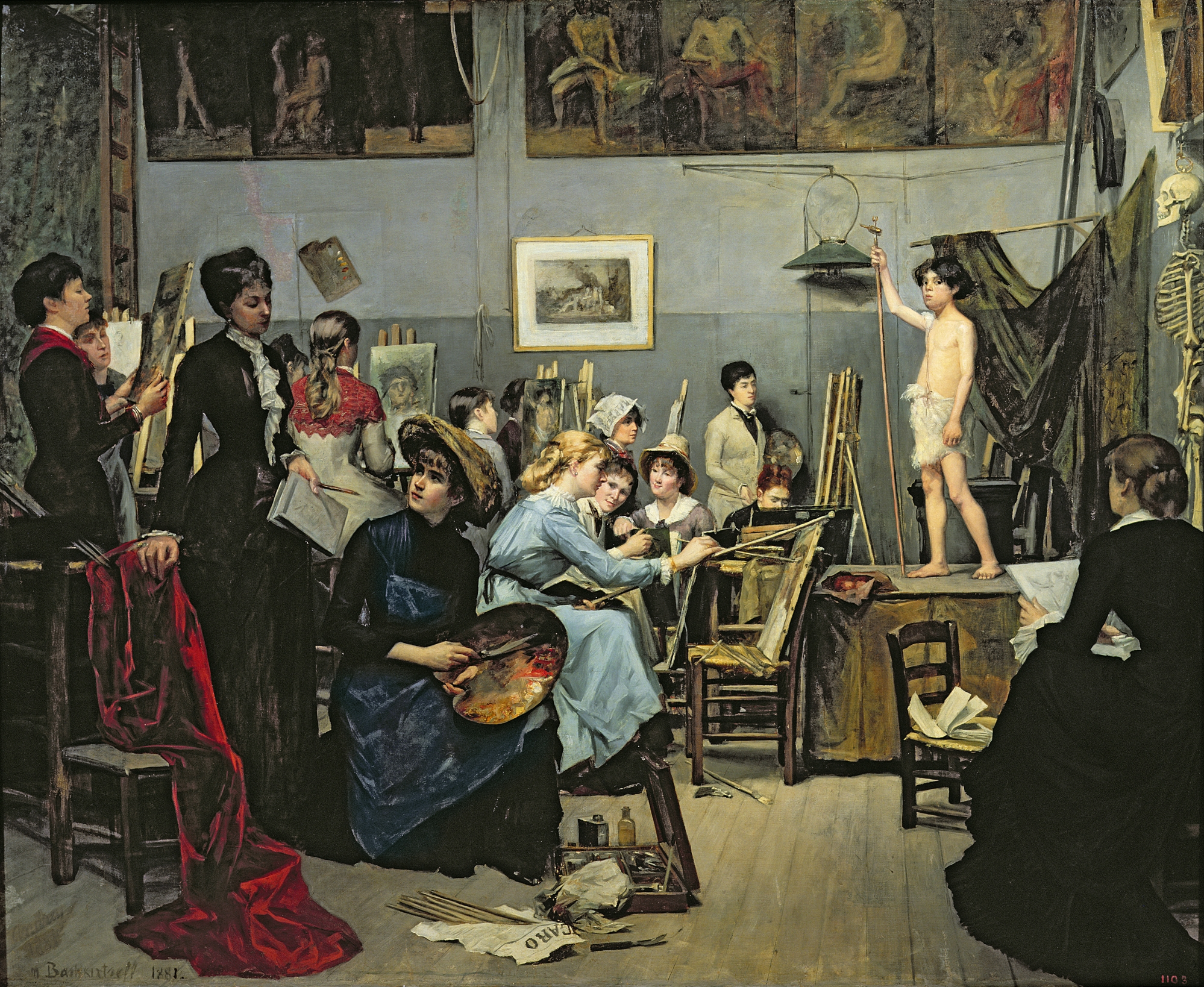
Real del Sarte as central figure in the 1881 painting In the Studio, by Marie Bashkirtseff

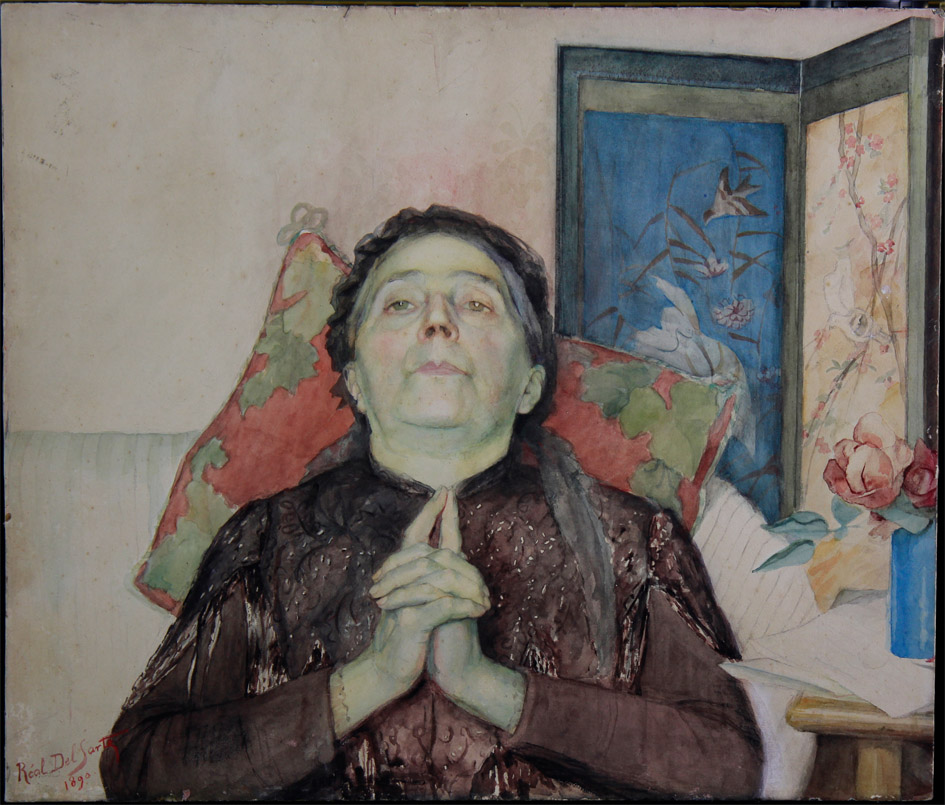
Portrait of her mother in 1890

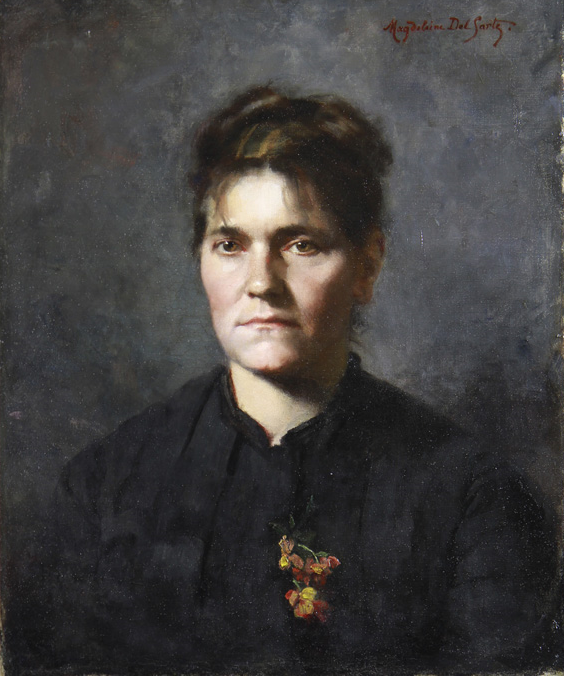
Portrait of her maid, which was on show at the Royal Academy in 1888
