= Maxime Real del Sarte =

French sculptor

Maxime Réal del Sarte
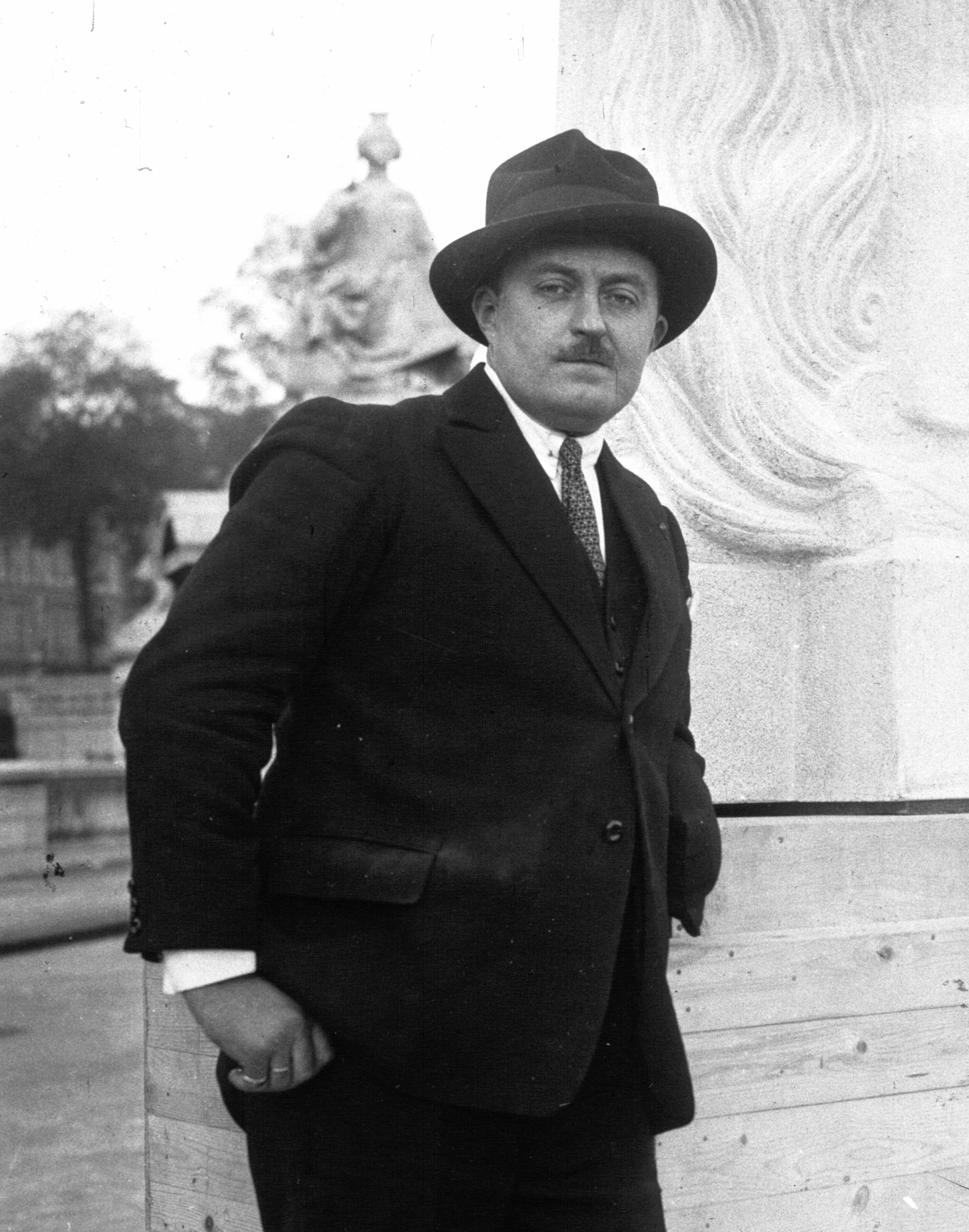
- Maxime Réal del Sarte in 1928
- Born: 2 May 1888; Paris, France
- Died: 15 February 1954 (age 65) near Saint-Jean-de-Luz, France
- Occupation: Sculptor
- Relatives: Georges Bizet

Maxime Real del Sarte (May 2, 1888 – February 15, 1954) was a French sculptor and political activist.

== Biography ==
=== Early life ===
Maxime Real del Sarte was born on 2 May 1888 in Paris, France, as the son of the sculptor Louis Desire Real and Marie Magdeleine Real del Sarte. He was a cousin of the painter Thérèse Geraldy and was also related to the composer Georges Bizet. He graduated from the École des Beaux-Arts, and by 1911 was at the Académie Julian, where both his mother and an aunt were teachers. He served in World War I, in the 106th Infantry Regiment of the French Army and had his left arm amputated in 1916 after being wounded at Verdun on 29 January.

=== Sculpture ===
He was a member of the Société des Artistes Français and exhibited with them from early in his career. He won the Grand Prix national des Beaux-Arts in 1921 for Le premier toit . He designed over fifty war memorials in France, including the Monument aux morts des Armées de Champagne at the Ferme de Navarin at Suippes, which depicts both French and US soldiers (this design was also produced as a medallic plaque). He also designed many statues of Joan of Arc, including one in Rouen placed effectively on the site where she was executed (1928). Additionally, he designed busts for the Dukes of Guise and Orleans, as well as a monument to King Edward VII at Biarritz (1922).

=== Politics ===
He became involved with the right-wing Action française, where he became associated with Charles Maurras, Léon Daudet, Jacques Bainville, Maurice Pujo, Henri Vaugeois and Léon de Montesquiou. He founded and led the Action française-affiliated royalist youth organisation the Camelots du roi. He was a devout and fervent Roman Catholic with a strong devotion to Joan of Arc. When he found out that Amédée Thalamas, a professor at the Lycee Condorcet who was critical of Joan of Arc, was to give lectures at the Sorbonne, he made sure to disrupt their course with his collaborators. He founded the organization "Les Compagnons de Jeanne d'Arc". He was wounded in an anti-parliamentary clash on 6 February 1934.

His statue of General Charles Mangin, which was made thanks to a subscription launched by Marshal Foch and erected on the Place Denys-Cochin, was destroyed by the Germans who occupied Paris in October 1940, on the express orders of Adolf Hitler, one of only two statues in Paris he ordered destroyed.

=== Death ===
He died on 15 February 1954 near Saint-Jean-de-Luz.
