= Marcel Baschet =

French portrait painter (1862–1941)

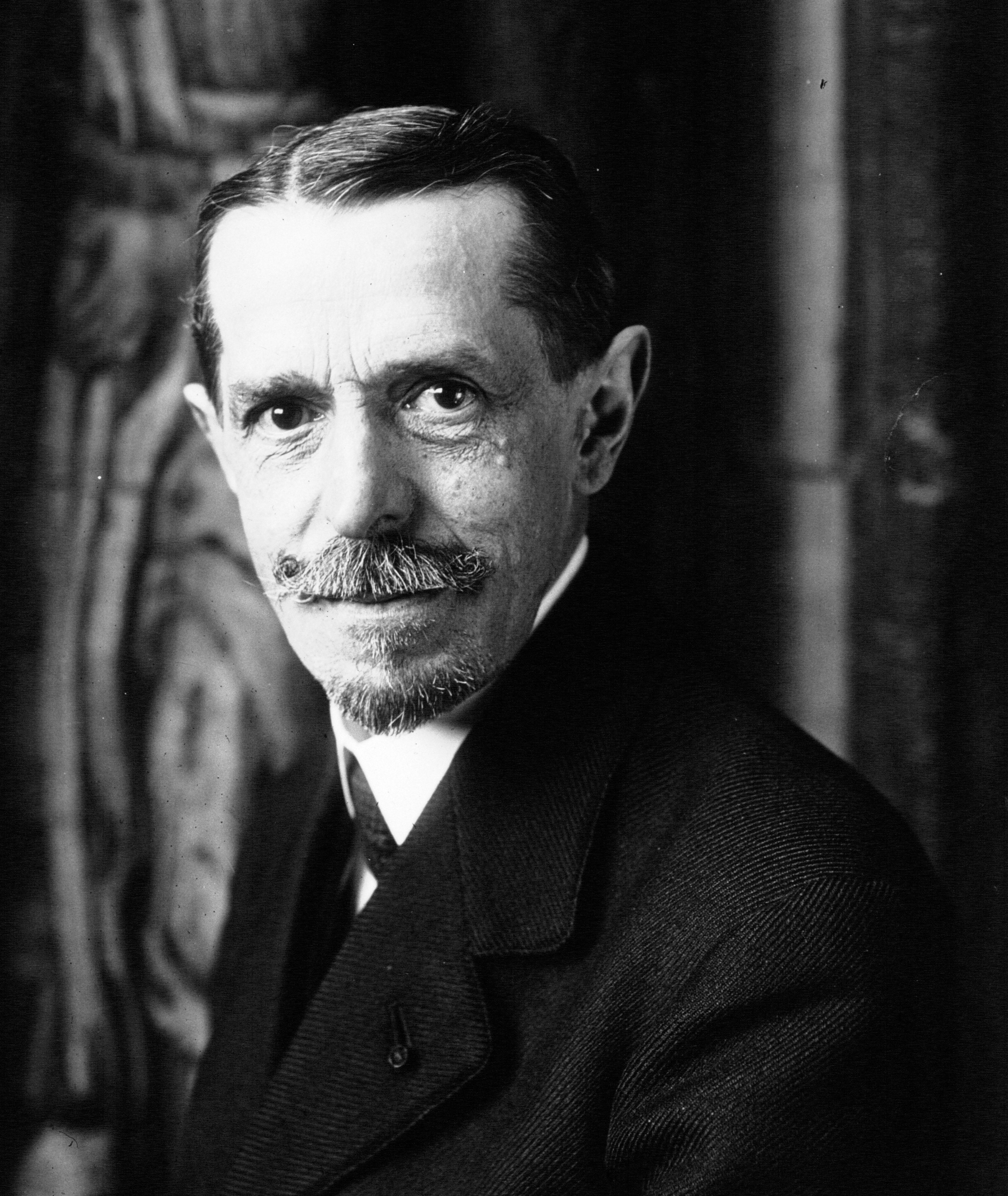
Baschet in1918

Marcel-André Baschet (5 August 1862 – 28 December 1941) was a French portrait painter, notable for his numerous portraits of the presidents of the French Third Republic.

== Biography ==
He was born in Gagny (Seine-et-Oise), the second son of the art editor Ludovic Baschet, editor of Panorama and the Revue illustrée. His brother René was the art critic for Salonsavant, and was editor of the magazine L'Illustration from 1904 to the first half of the 20th century. At 17, Marcel entered the Académie Julian in the studio of Jules Lefebvre. A student at the École des beaux-arts de Paris in the studio of Gustave Boulanger, in 1883 he won the Grand Prix de Rome for painting for Oedipus curses his son Polynices, and became a pensionist at the Villa Médicis in Rome from 1883 to 1887.

On 3 January 1888, he married Jeanne Guillemeteau, and they had two children, one son and one daughter. He became a teacher at the Académie Julian in 1889. From 1900, he spent a number of years as a teacher to Princess Mathilde. From 1907 to 1941, he had a shop at 21 Quai Voltaire in Paris, where a commemorative plaque was placed after his death. He won the médaille d'honneur in 1908 for his portrait of Henri Rochefort, and his portrait of Claude Debussy was exhibited around the world. He was awarded the Knight of the Légion d'honneur in 1898, and then in 1913, he was elected a member of the Académie des beaux-arts.

His works are held in a number of private collections and museums, including the Musée d'Orsay and Château de Versailles. His younger brother Jacques (1872–1952) was a historian, art critic, artistic director, and editor of the magazine L'Illustration, and director of a national company.

== Works ==
(incomplete list)

=== Paintings ===
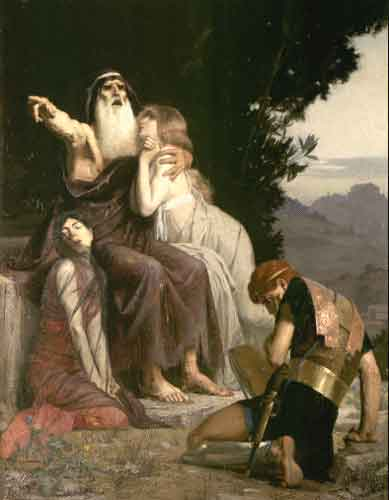
Oedipus curses his son Polynices, awarded the 1883 Grand Prix de Rome

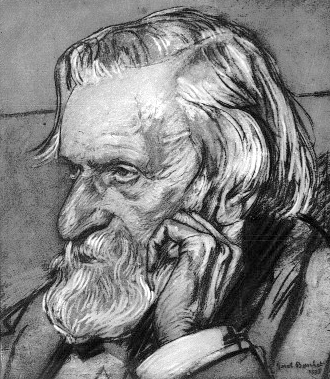
Ambroise Thomas (1896)

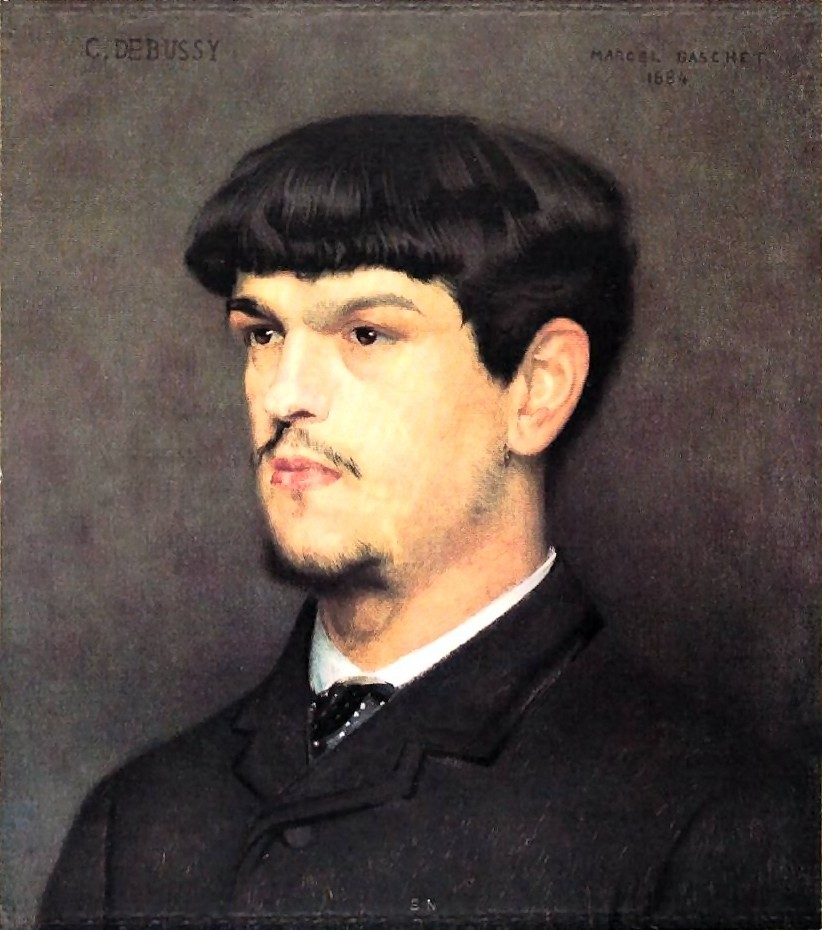
Claude Debussy (1884)

- Claude Debussy, 1884, oil on panel, 24.5 x 21.5 cm, Musée d'Orsay
- M. Vendryès, 1892
- Ambroise Thomas, portrait presented at the exhibition of the Salon des artistes français in 1895, published in L'Artiste, November 1896
- Henri Brisson, 1896
- Mrs Gabriel Pierné, wife of the composer, 1897, presented in competition at the Salon des artistes français in 1898
- Charles Pardinel, 1898
- Portrait of family, 1899, oil on canvas, presented in competition at the Salon des artistes français
- Comtesse de Bourbon-Ligniéres, 1900
- Mrs Delacroix, 1900
- René Baschet, 1901
- Armande Fajard, 1901
- Pierre Baschet, 1901
- Jérôme Doucet
- Mrs René Baschet, 1905
- Jules Lefebvre, 1905
- Roger Baschet, 1907
- Ludovic Baschet, 1907
- Henri Lavedan, 1907
- Mrs Georges Leygues, 1907
- Henri Rochefort, 1908
- Louise Weiss, 1909
- Jean Richepin, 1910
- Count of Gramont, 1910
- Countess Pillet-Will, 1910
- Count of Bourbon-Lignières, 1910
- Miss Cocteau, 1910
- Seydoux boys, 1910
- Marquis de Dion, 1911
- Raymond Poincaré, 1913
- Suzanne Fajard, 1915
- Mrs Lyautey, 1915
- Aristide Briand, 1917
- Général Gouraud, 1919
- Maréchal Foch, 1919, pastel on paper, 57 x 42 cm, Musée de l'Armée
- Duke of Mortemart, 1919
- Miss Michelin, 1920
- Alexandre Millerand, 1922
- Gaston Doumergue, 1926, oil on canvas, 122 x 95 cm, Musée du Château de Versailles
- Philippe Pétain, 1926
- The Maharajah of Kapurthala, 1927
- Maréchal Fayolle, 1927
- Duchess of Brissac, 1927
- Mr and Mrs Schlumberger, 1928
- Marquis of Juigné, 1929
- Marquis of Vogüé, 1929
- Baron von Zuylen, 1929
- Duke of Broglie, 1930
- Général Weygand, 1930
- Maurice de Broglie, 1932
- Paul Doumer, 1932, oil on canvas, 137 x 101 cm, Musée du Château de Versailles
- Albert Lebrun, 1934, oil on canvas, 129 x 104 cm, Musée du Château de Versailles
- Fadri Aga Khan, 1934
- Mrs Roger Couvelaire, 1930
- Baron of Turckeim, 1938
- Édouard Branly, 1939

=== Engravings, lithographs ===
- Le Salon de Peinture, portrait of Melle Louise Lyman

=== Illustrations ===
- Drogues et Peinture 24 illustrations by the artist, édition Laboratoire pharmaceutique Chantereau à Paris, Album d'Art Contemporain, n° 54, s. d., v. 1937

== Exhibitions ==
- 1908 - Salon des Artistes Français : Médaille d'Honneur

== Prizes, awards ==
- 1883 - First Grand Prix de Rome for painting
- 1908 - Médaille d'Honneur of the Salon des Artistes Français
- 1913 - Member of the Académie des beaux-arts
- Society of Artistes français

== Museums, monuments ==
- Musée de l'Armée
- Musée du Château de Versailles
- Musée d'Orsay

== Students ==
(incomplete list)

- John William Ashton (1881–1963)
- Pierre Gourdault (1880-1915)
- Léonie Humbert-Vignot (1878-1960) at the Académie Julian
- Marthe Orant (1874-1951)
- Charles Picart Le Doux (1881-1959)
- André Prévot-Valéri (1890-1956)
- Paulo do Valle Júnior (1886-1958)
- Thérèse Geraldy (1884-1965)

== Bibliography ==
- François Antoine Vizzavona, Portrait de l'Artiste en Académicien
- Jacques Baschet, Marcel Baschet, sa vie, son œuvre, Imp Sadag, L'Illustration, 1942
- Société des Artistes Français. Salon de 1928: Exposition Annuelle des Beaux-Arts, 1928.
- Joseph Uzanne, Figures contemporaines tirées de l'album Mariani, Librairie Henri Floury Paris, vol. VI, 1901
