= François Wartel =

French opera singer

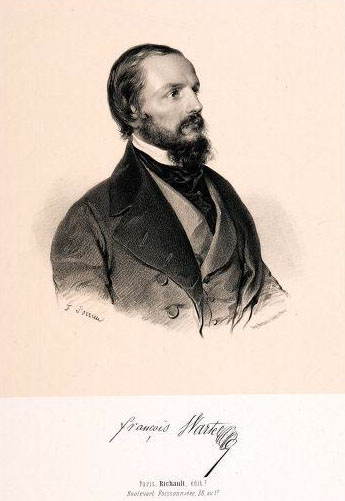
François Wartel

Pierre-François Wartel (born Versailles, 3 April 1806; died Paris 3 August 1882) was a French tenor and music educator. His wife was Thérèse Wartel, a talented pianist, and their son Émile was a bass who sang and created several operatic roles between 1857 and 1870 at the Théâtre Lyrique and later founded his own singing school.

== Biography ==
In 1825 François Wartel enrolled at the Paris Conservatoire as a pupil of Fromental Halévy, but soon thereafter began studies in Choron's Institut de la Musique Religieuse. After finishing his studies at Choron's Institute in 1828 he returned to the Conservatoire to pursue vocal studies with Banderali and Nourrit and obtained a first prize for singing in 1829.

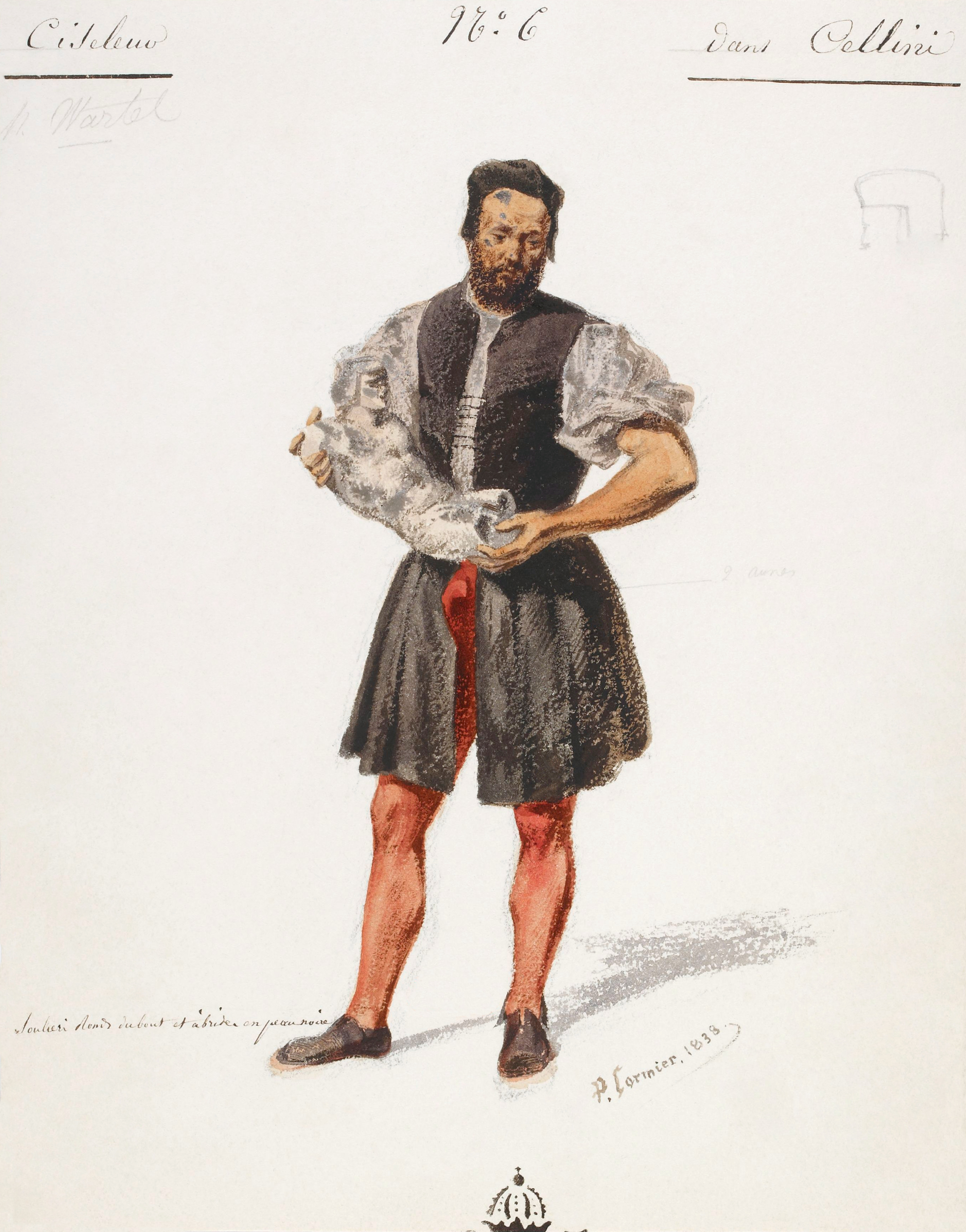
As Francesco in Benvenuto Cellini

From 1831 to 1846 he played small tenor parts at the Paris Opera, where he created the role of Francesco in Berlioz's Benvenuto Celini (10 September 1838) and roles in two operas by Donizetti, Néarque in Les martyrs (10 April 1840) and Don Gaspar in La favorite (2 December 1840). He also played Ottokar in the Berlioz version of Carl Maria von Weber's Der Freischütz (7 June 1841).

Along with Nourrit he advanced the appreciation of Schubert's lieder in France by performing them frequently in his recitals, travelled to Berlin, Prague, and Vienna to give concerts, and performed 16th-century music in the Concerts Historiques of François-Joseph Fétis (1831–1833).

Wartel devoted himself mainly to teaching after 1842 and was thought among the best teachers of the time. His most well-known pupils included Christine Nilsson and Zelia Trebelli-Bettini.
