= Émile Louis Picault =

French sculptor

Emile Picault
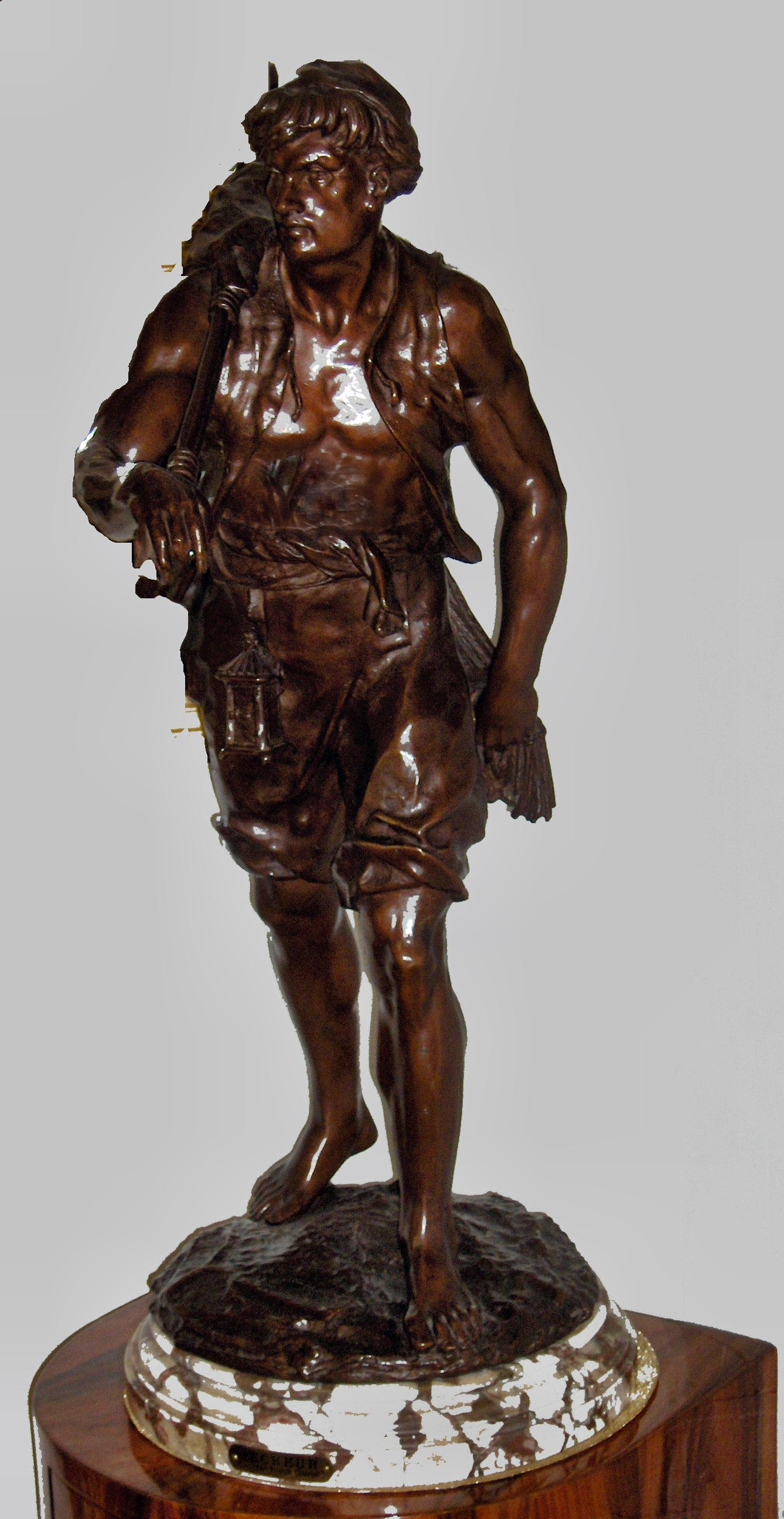
- Le pêcheur by Picault, c. 1880
- Born: Emile Louis Picault; August 24, 1833; Paris, France
- Died: 24 August 1915 (aged 82); France
- Known for: Sculpture

Émile Louis Picault (French: [emil lwi piko]; 24 August 1833 – 24 August 1915) was a French sculptor, best known for works depicting allegorical and patriotic subjects, and mythological heroes. Picault was a very prolific artist, producing sculptures in abundance—over 500 models in total—during his long sculpting career. He began to show his artwork at the Salon beginning in 1863. He signed the majority of his work as "E. Picault".

== Works ==
=== Bronzes (Salon displayed) ===
(Source):

- Le Supplice de Tantale (1867)
- Persée délivrant Andromède (1880)
- Le Génie du progrès et Nicolas Flamel (1885)
- Le Cid (1886)
- La Naissance de Pégase (1888)
- La Force Domtée
- Le Génie des sciences (1894)
- Le Génie des arts (1895)
- Le Livre (1896)
- Le Drapeau "ad unum" (1898)
- Vox progressi (1903)
- Belléphoron (1906)

=== Medallions ===
(Source):

- Joseph expliquant les songes du Pharaon (1888)
- L'Agriculture (1888)

=== Plasters ===
(Source):

- Jason (1879)
- Andromède (1892)
- Prométhée dérobant le feu du ciel (1894)
- La Vaillance (1896)
- Vertus civiques (1897)
- Le Minerai (1902)
- La Forge (1905)
- Science et Industrie (1909)
- Propter gloriam (1914)

== Museum exhibitions ==
(Source):

Picault's work can be seen in museums in the following cities:

- Chambéry (Le Semeur d'idées, 45 cm)
- Clermont-Ferrand (Hébé, 93 cm)
- Maubeuge (Le devoir, Honor patria, 45 cm)
- Troyes (La famille, joies et peines)
