= André Prévot-Valéri =

French painter (1890–1959)

- Born: 20 March 1890; Paris, France
- Died: July 1959 (aged 69); Granville, Manche, France
- Education: Auguste Prévot-Valéri, Marcel Baschet, Henri Royer, Louis-Marie Désiré-Lucas.
- Father: Auguste Prévot-Valéri
- Awards: Henri Zuber Prize, 1914 and 1920; Prix Rosa-Bonheur, 1928

Signature
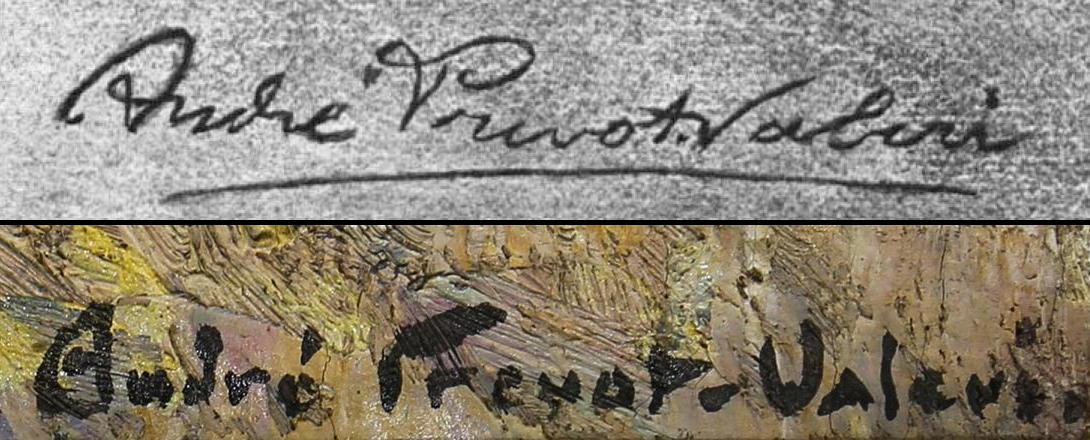

André Prévot-Valéri (French: [ɑ̃dʁe pʁevo valeri]; 20 March 1890 – July 1959) was a French painter known for pastoral and coastal landscapes, especially in Normandy, where he spent the last decades of his life. He also published drawings of scenes he witnessed as a soldier during World War I. He was the son of the landscape painter Auguste Prévot-Valéri (1857–1930). Father and son were both recipients of the Prix Rosa-Bonheur.

== Education, early success, World War I ==
When Prévot-Valéri was born in 1890, his father Auguste was in his early thirties and becoming a well-established painter of landscapes. Prévot-Valéri grew up in the studio he was to share with his father until the latter's death in 1930, at rue Aumont-Théville, 6. The building was also home to numerous other artists, including J. M. Barnsley, George Wharton Edwards, Carlos-Lefebvre, and Joseph de La Nézière. The building still stands, and from the street one can see the large, high windows that make its rooms ideal for artists' studios.

As a youth, he showed an aptitude, shared with his father, for playing the violin. He considered a career in music, but ultimately chose to devote himself to painting. He learned from his father, and also studied under Marcel Baschet, Henri Royer, and Louis-Marie Désiré-Lucas.

He made his debut at age 20 at the Paris Salon of 1910 with a winter landscape, Les pommières; hiver. He had immediate success, and continued to exhibit every year through 1914, winning a series of awards: the Édouard Lemaître Prize in 1911; an honorable mention from the Salon in 1912; and in 1914, for his painting Le village (subsequently purchased by the State), a bronze medal as well as the Henri Zuber Prize.

Both the Paris Salon and Prévot-Valéri's career came to a halt with the onset of World War I. As a soldier, he contributed eye-witness charcoal drawings of warfare to the weekly publication Les Annales politiques et littéraires. His charcoal drawing La Patrouille dans la Nuit (1915) was exhibited in 1918 in Paris at the Exposition Organisée au Profit des Oeuvres de Guerre. Some of his wartime drawings are preserved at the British Museum in London (Wounded Soldiers in Granville Harbor, 1914) and at the Archives du Calvados in Caen (l'attaque de Poilus, 1914).

== Return to landscapes ==
When the Paris Salon resumed in 1919, André returned to painting landscapes. The collector and critic Jeanne Magnin, who closely followed the careers of both Auguste and André Prévot-Valéri, described André's Le Hameau: "A corner of nature well observed, tasted and felt, the sweetness of autumn in the village," a work "rich in promise."

At the Paris Salon of 1920, Magnin compared and contrasted the works of father and son, suggesting that each influenced the other:

Auguste Prevot-Valeri has singularly transformed his style since last year; it seems that his maturity is emancipating. He liked lonely expanses, the fine gray of dimmed lights, the softness of the end of day muffled with silence. Today with his Troupeau, even more than with his Moutons dans les greaves, he is making a big noise, knowing only violent effects, heavy strokes, brutally struck color…it is only the process that differs; the skill remains the same…André Prevot-Valeri paints like his father in a heavy manner, but has a greater feeling of light…light constitutes the greatest attraction of his Paysage d'été, where the girl watches over her white geese in a fiery atmosphere. The delicacy of the eye and the sincerity of the impression are, in the son, superior to the métier.

Prévot-Valéri won the Henri Zuber Prize a second time in 1920, the Prix de la Société des Paysagistes in 1921, and a silver medal at the Paris Salon of 1923. In 1926, he had a one-man exhibition at the Galerie Poissonnière in Paris; a reviewer wrote of his "exquisite sensitivity" and "joyous landscapes, in the middle of which one would like to live…While being modern, he remains humble before nature, and his inspiration comes only from a constant contact with it." In 1928 he was awarded the Prix Rosa-Bonheur, named for the great French painter of animals, Rosa Bonheur, which his father had won in 1908.

Father and son exhibited together for the final time at the Paris Salon that opened April 30, 1930. On August 5, 1930, after a career spanning almost five decades, Auguste Prévot-Valéri died in Jouarre, France, at the age of 73.

In 1936, André Prévot-Valéri moved from Paris to the Cotentin Peninsula of Normandy, where he spent the last decades of his life painting pastoral scenes, seascapes, and images of the kelp harvests.

He died in July, 1959, survived by a son, Pierre Prévot.

== At auction ==
A record price for a work by André Prévot-Valéri was set by Cueillette dans le verger au printemps, auctioned for $10,000 at Matsart Auctioneers & Appraisers, Jerusalem, on January 21, 2014.

== In museums, archives, and public collections ==
- Baud, Musée de la carte postale: Village Breton and Ramasseuses de varech, undated postcard reproductions.
- Caen, Archives du Calvados: Première guerre mondiale, l'attaque des Poilus (1914); Femme brûlant des algues; Repos aux champs; Paysage; Foire normande; Mont-Saint-Michel.
- Caen, Musée des Beaux-Arts: Paysage, bords de la Sienne (by 1922).
- Bordeaux, Quartier général de l'Armée de Terre Sud-Ouest: Le village (Paris Salon, 1914).
- London, British Museum: Wounded Soldiers in Granville Harbor (1914).
- Ruynes-en-Margeride, Mairie (town hall): Paysage sous la neige (by 1918).
- Saint-Lô, Direction départementale des affaires sanitaires et sociales de la Manche: Panneau décoratif (by 1941).

== Bibliography ==
- Prévot-Valéri, André. Charcoal drawings of World War I reproduced in Les Annales politiques et littéraires, 1915-1916:
  - L'Assault, August 22, 1915, p. 218.
  - La Victoire, August 22, 1915, p. 219.
  - La Patrouille dans la Nuit, August 29, 1915. pp. 248–249; exhibited in 1918 in Paris at the Exposition Organisée au Profit des Oeuvres de Guerre.
  - L'Offensive, October 10, 1915. pp. 426–427.
  - Sus au Bulgare!, November 18, 1915, p. 639.
  - Dans la Nuit, February 6, 1916, pp. 160–161.
- Prévot-Valéri, André. Départ pour la récolte du varech, Société des Artistes Français (1928). Explication des ouvrages de peinture et dessins, sculpture, architecture, gravure et lithographie des artistes vivants..., (catalogue, Salon of 1928), Paris: Georges Lang, 1928, picture insert p. 46.

== Sources ==
- Magnin, Jeanne (1918-1919). "Les Artistes Bourguignon au Salon de 1919 et à la Triennale", La Revue de Bourgogne, v. 7,1918-1919, pp. 335–345.
- Magnin, Jeanne (1920). "Les Artistes Bourguignon aux Salons de 1920", La Revue de Bourgogne, v. 8, 1920, pp. 175–187.
- Marquis de Rochegude. Promenades dans toutes les rues de Paris: arrondissements XVII, Paris: Hachette, 1910.
- "Petites Tablettes de l'Amateur d'Art", La Presse, May 2, 1926, p. 2.
- Société des Artistes Français (1914). Explication des ouvrages de peinture et dessins, sculpture, architecture et gravure des artistes vivants..., (catalogue, Salon of 1914), Paris: Paul Dupont, 1914.
- Société des Artistes Français; Société Nationale des Beaux-Arts (1918). Exposition organisée au profit des oeuvres de guerre, 1 mai-30 juin 1918, Paris, 1918.
- Société des Artistes Français (1928). Explication des ouvrages de peinture et dessins, sculpture, architecture, gravure et lithographie des artistes vivants..., (catalogue, Salon of 1928), Paris: Georges Lang, 1928.
- Société des Artistes Français (1930). Explication des ouvrages de peinture et dessins, sculpture, architecture et gravure des artistes vivants..., (catalogue, Salon of 1930), Paris: Georges Lang, 1930.
