= Auguste Prévot-Valéri =

French painter

- Born: Valéri Prévost; 21 January 1857; Villeneuve-sur-Yonne, France
- Died: 5 August 1930 (aged 73); Jouarre, France
- Education: Bénédict Rougelet, Antoine Guillemet, Jules Lefebvre
- Works: Retour au hameau, 1908
- Children: André Prévot-Valéri
- Awards: Prix Rosa-Bonheur, 1908

Signature
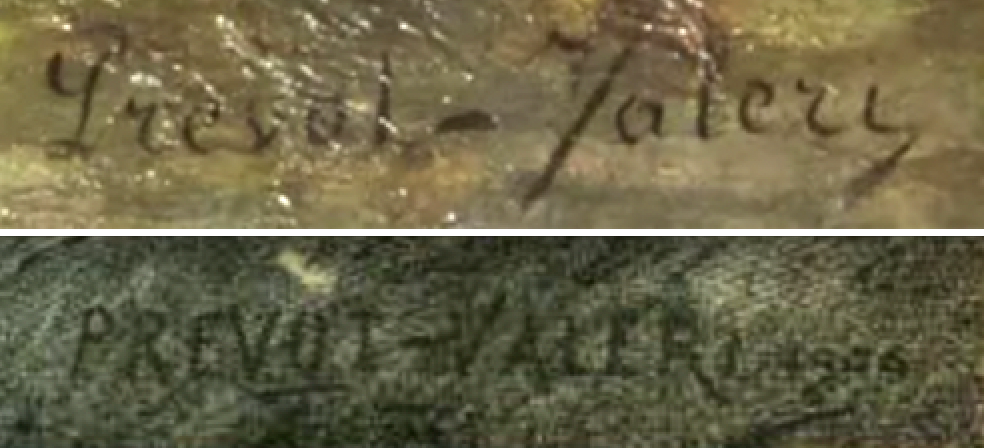

Auguste Prévot-Valéri, pseudonym of Valéri Prévost (French: [oɡyst pʁevo valeri]; 21 January 1857 – 5 August 1930), was a French painter known for pastoral landscapes. He was the father and teacher of the landscape painter André Prévot-Valéri (1890–1957).

== Early career ==
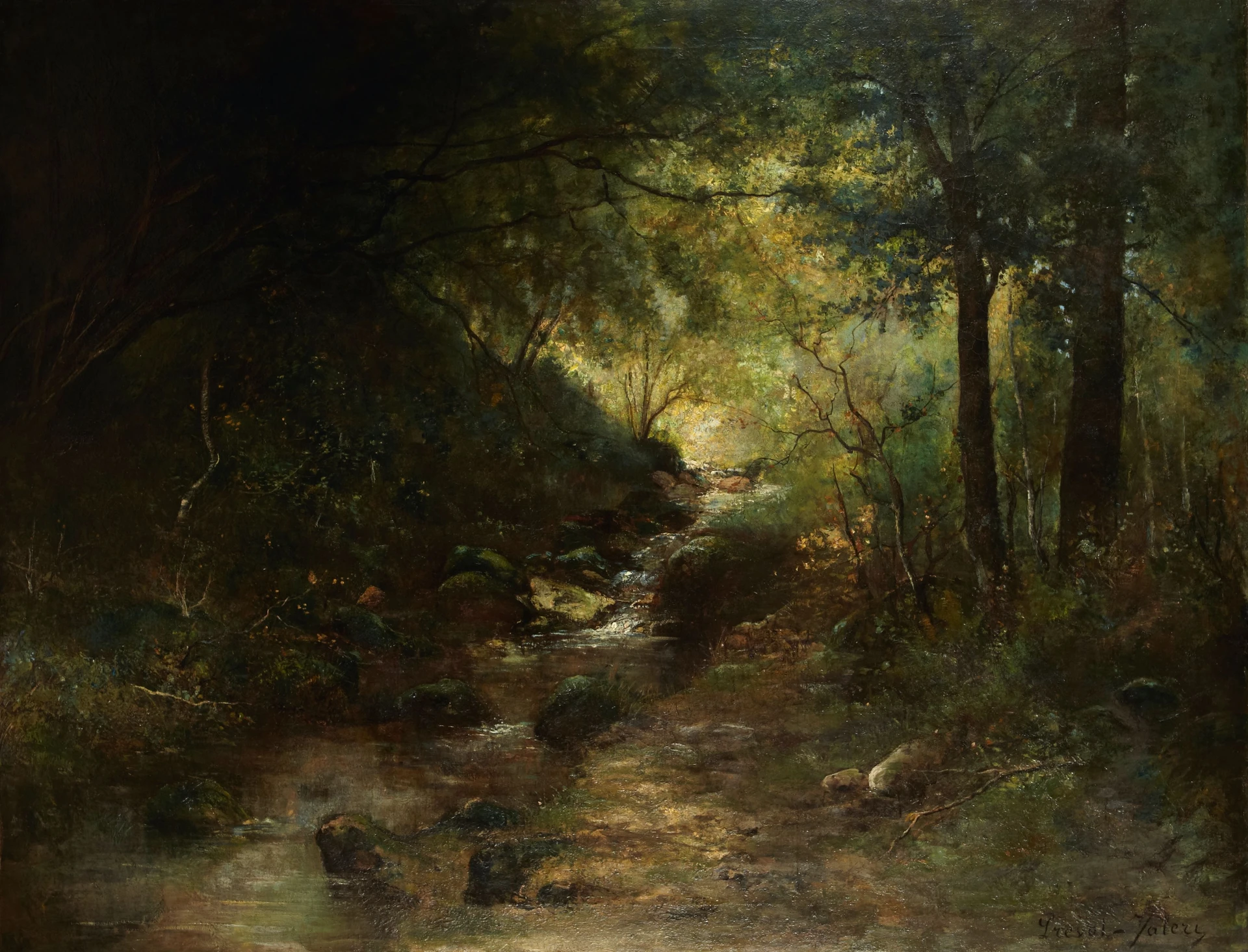
Le fond du rû (date unknown): The stream called "le grand rû" by the villagers of Villiers-sur-Morin inspired Prévot-Valéri from the very beginning of his career.

The birth record of Valéri Prévost states that he was born in the town of Villeneuve-sur-Yonne, the son of Élisabeth Prévost, a domestic worker; no father was recorded.

Little is known about his life until he moved to Paris and became a pupil of the sculptor Bénédict Rougelet. He first exhibited at the annual Paris Salon of 1882 as a sculptor, listed in the program as Valéri Prévot (with no letter "s" in his last name). In 1883 he again exhibited a sculpture and was listed as Auguste Prévot-Valéri, the name he used from that time onward, signing his works Prévot-Valéri, sometimes using all capitals, and sometimes a more stylized script.

At the end of 1883 he exhibited paintings in the Exposition des Jeunes Artistes (he was twenty-six). The reviewer in Journal des Artistes described him as a painter of abundant talent who had not yet found his métier:

Prévot-Valéri stops us and surprises us…The artist has real talent…but how is it that he treats landscape in such disparate ways?…We saw first a small, delightful landscape: Petit ruisseau à Villiers, like Courbet but with more clarity, in any case strongly, beautifully painted.…Effet du soir surprised us. A vague, purplish landscape, barely touched. One would have said Jules Breton. Then Les Bœufs dans un chemin creux in yet another key, darker and more serious. All this is very well separately, filled with talent, but in which of these paintings do we find the real Prévot-Valéri?

In the program for the Paris Salon of 1884, he was listed as a pupil of the renowned landscape painter Antoine Guillemet and exhibited both sculpture (a plaster medallion portrait of Sarah Bernhardt, who owned the piece) and a landscape, Le ruisseau de Villiers.

In 1885 he moved from boulevard Malesherbes, 69, to rue Aumont-Théville, 6, an address he was to keep for the rest of his life. The street was only a block long; the long building with Prévot-Valéri's atelier was also home to numerous other artists, including J. M. Barnsley, George Wharton Edwards, Carlos-Lefebvre, and Joseph de La Nézière. The building still stands, and from the street can be seen the large, high windows that make its rooms ideal for artists' studios.

In the program for the Paris Salon of 1887, Jules Lefebvre was listed for the first time as one of Prévot-Valéri's teachers.

Like a number of other artists, he was drawn to the pastoral and riparian landscapes around the town of Villiers-sur-Morin, where his circle included Armand Guéry and Amédée Servin. Placards on a self-guided walk in the town note the locations where he painted Le clos Monsieur; Seine-et-Marne (1898) and Le fond du rû; Villiers-sur-Morin.

== Father and son share career success ==
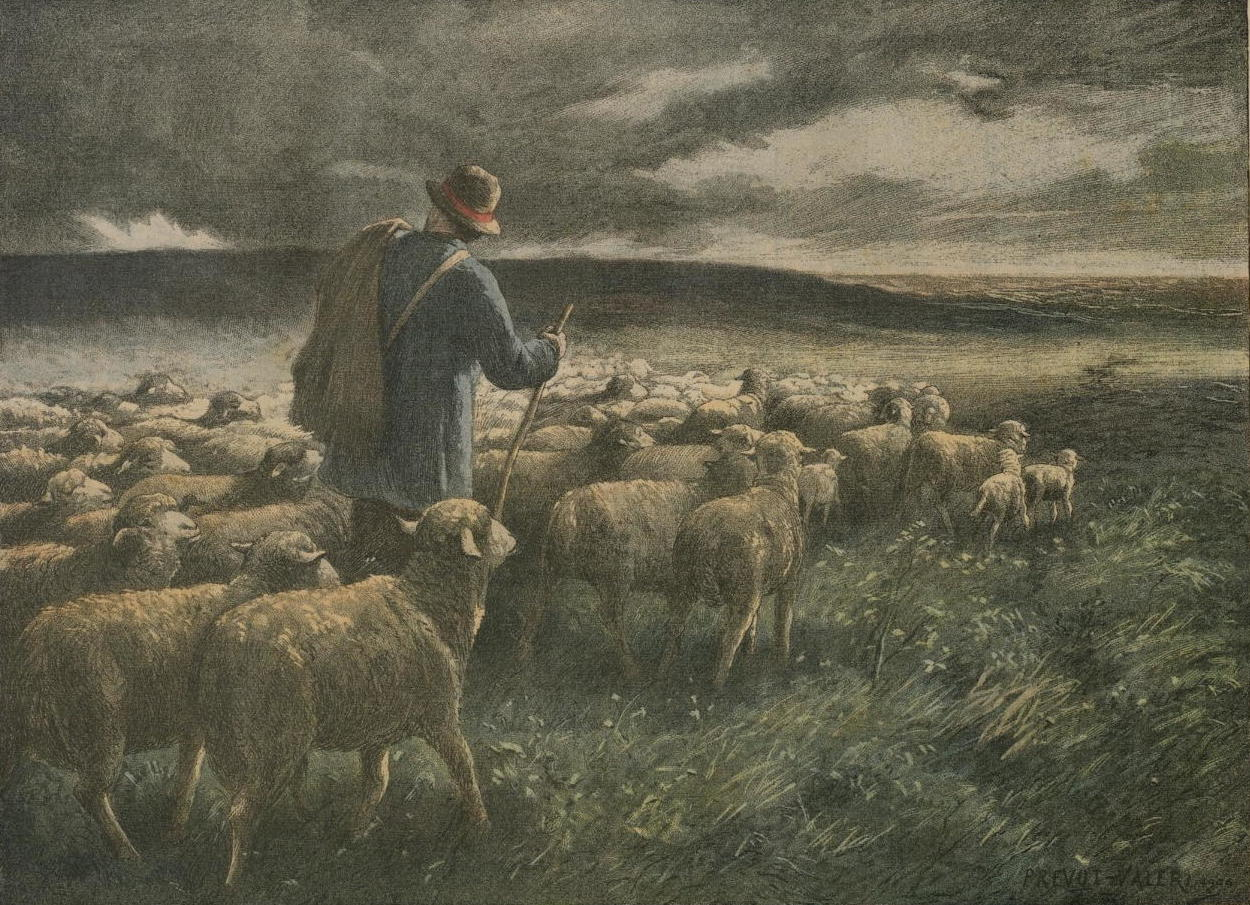
Fuyant l'orage (Fleeing the Storm), exhibited at the Paris Salon of 1906 and reproduced in the Sunday supplement of Le Petit Journal, which wrote: "Under the low sky, laden with heavy storm clouds, the shepherd presses his flock towards the stable. The work is striking, imbued with both realism and poetry, and enjoyed at the last Salon the greatest success.…The paintings of M. Prévôt-Valéri are particularly appreciated by art-lovers, because they always reflect harmonious effects and deep feelings."

1890 saw the birth of his son André, who, under the tutelage of his father and sharing the same studio, would also become a landscape painter of note, though in a style strikingly different from that of his father. (André also took instruction from Marcel Baschet, Henri Royer, and Louis-Marie Désiré-Lucas.)

In 1896, Alphonse James de Rothschild purchased his painting L'Automne à Dammartin and donated it to the Musée Antoine-Lécuyer in Saint-Quentin; the painting is now missing. In 1898, Rothschild purchased Le soir; au Mesnil (Seine-et-Marne) and donated it to the Musée d'Art de Toulon. In 1900, Rothschild purchased Les meules, crépuscule and donated it to the Musée de Bergues; the painting was destroyed by warfare in 1940.

At the Exposition Universelle of 1900, Prévot-Valéri exhibited Le clos Monsieur; Seine-et-Marne and was awarded a bronze medal.

In 1908, for his painting Retour au hameau, he was awarded the Prix Rosa-Bonheur, named for the great French painter of animals, Rosa Bonheur. The award cemented his reputation as a pre-eminent painter of pastoral landscapes, particularly scenes of shepherds and sheep. The painting was purchased by Baron Edmond de Rothschild, who donated it to the Musée des Beaux-Arts de Dijon. Twenty years later, in 1928, Prévot-Valéri saw the same award bestowed on his son André.

In 1908 his work was shown at the Franco-British Exhibition in London, in 1910 at the Exposición Internacional del Centenario in Buenos Aires, and in 1911 at the Esposizione Internazionale di Roma.

Beginning with Andre's debut at the Paris Salon of 1910, there were a number of years when both father and son exhibited works. The collector and critic Jeanne Magnin compared and contrasted their works at the Salon of 1920, suggesting that each influenced the other:

Auguste Prevot-Valeri has singularly transformed his style since last year; it seems that his maturity is emancipating. He liked lonely expanses, the fine gray of dimmed lights, the softness of the end of day muffled with silence. Today with his Troupeau, even more than with his Moutons dans les greaves, he is making a big noise, knowing only violent effects, heavy strokes, brutally struck color…it is only the process that differs; the skill remains the same…André Prevot-Valeri paints like his father in a heavy manner, but has a greater feeling of light…light constitutes the greatest attraction of his Paysage d'été, where the girl watches over her white geese in a fiery atmosphere. The delicacy of the eye and the sincerity of the impression are, in the son, superior to the métier.

In 1923, Magnin praised the continuing evolution of the elder Prévot-Valéri's work: "If the hand grows heavy, the vision grows wider and more powerful.…a poetry not banal but melancholy and virile."

Father and son exhibited together for the final time at the Paris Salon that opened 30 April 1930. The two paintings by Auguste were entitled Tropeau buvant and La rentrée.

On 5 August 1930, after a career spanning almost five decades, Auguste Prévot-Valéri died in Jouarre, France, at the age of 73.

== In museums and public buildings ==
Prévot-Valéri's works are held by a number of collections in France.

- Coulommiers, Seine-et-Marne, Mairie (town hall): Marché aux veaux.
- Coulommiers, Seine-et-Marne, Musée Municipal des Capucins: Pêcheur à l'épervier; bords du Morin (Paris Salon 1891).
- Dijon, Musée des Beaux-Arts: Retour au hameau (Paris Salon 1908).
- Nancy, Musée des Beaux-Arts: Coteaux de Montbrieux; Seine-et-Marne (Paris Salon 1894).
- Paris, Petit Palais: Débordement du Morin (Paris Salon 1901).
- Saint-Omer, Musée de l'Hôtel Sandelin: Chemin de Prémol; le soir (Paris Salon 1901).
- Toulon, Musée d'Art de Toulon: Le soir; au Mesnil (Seine-et-Marne) (Paris Salon 1898).

== Sources ==
- Baudin, Pierre. Expositions internationales de Buenos Aires 1910: rapport du commissaire général du gouvernement de la république, Paris: Comité français des expositions à l'étranger, 1912.
- Catalogo della mostra di belle arti, esposizione internazionale di Roma, Bergamo: Instituto italiano d'arti grafiche, 1911.
- Exposition franco-britannique de Londres 1908: catalogue spécial officiel de la section française., Paris: Comité français des expositions à l'étranger, 1908.
- "Fuyant l'orage", Le Petit Journal, Supplément du Dimanche, September 9, 1906, pp. 282 (text) and 288 (image).
- Magnin, Jeanne (1920). "Les Artistes Bourguignon aux Salons de 1920", La Revue de Bourgogne, v. 8, 1920, pp. 175–187.
- Magnin, Jeanne (1923). "Les Artistes Bourguignon aux Grand Palais en 1923", La Revue de Bourgogne, v. 11, part 2. 1923, pp. 372–380.
- Marquis de Rochegude. Promenades dans toutes les rues de Paris: arrondissements XVII, Paris: Hachette, 1910.
- Pick, Jules. "L’Exposition des Jeunes Artistes", Journal des Artistes, December 23, 1883, p. 1.
- Saunier, Charles. L'Exposition des beaux-arts: Salon de 1908, Paris: Goupil et Cie, 1908.
- Société des Artistes Français (1928). Explication des ouvrages de peinture et dessins, sculpture, architecture et gravure des artistes vivants..., (catalogue, Salon of 1928), Paris: Georges Lang, 1928.
- Société des Artistes Français (1930). Explication des ouvrages de peinture et dessins, sculpture, architecture et gravure des artistes vivants..., (catalogue, Salon of 1930), Paris: Georges Lang, 1930.
