= Athletics at the 1896 Summer Olympics – Men's 1500 metres =

Men's 1500 metres at the Games of the I Olympiad
- Venue: Panathinaiko Stadium
- Dates: April 7
- Competitors: 8 from 5 nations
- Winning time: 4:33.2 OR

Medalists
1st place, gold medalist(s)		Edwin Flack; Australia
2nd place, silver medalist(s)		Arthur Blake; United States
3rd place, bronze medalist(s)		Albin Lermusiaux; France

The men's 1500 metres race, the longest flat-track race of the 1896 Summer Olympics programme, was the last event on 7 April. It was run in a single heat, with eight athletes competing.

== Summary ==
Albin Lermusiaux of France led for most of the race, but was caught by Edwin Flack and Arthur Blake 100 meters from the finish.

Flack pulled away to beat Blake by five meters, becoming the first Australian Olympic champion, with Lermusiaux finishing third, a further 15 meters back.

The four Greek athletes trailed the other four athletes, though records do not indicate which position the last two finished in.

== Background ==
This was the first appearance of the event, which is one of 12 athletics events to have been held at every Summer Olympics. Albin Lermusiaux of France had held the unofficial world record for two weeks in 1895; the two men who had broken his record since then were not present in Athens. Arthur Blake of the United States and Edwin Flack of Australia were also significant distance runners competing.

== Competition format ==
The competition consisted of a single round.

The track was 330 metres in circumference, unlike modern tracks, which are 400 metres: as such, the race 15 meters longer than 4 1/2 laps. The track had very sharp turns and was made of loose cinders, making running difficult. Runners also turned clockwise, rather than the current counterclockwise turns.

== Records ==
World record	Thomas Conneff (USA)	4:15.6 (u)	New York City, United States	26 August 1895
Olympic record	New event	n/a	n/a	n/a

Edwin Flack set the initial Olympic record of 4:33.2 in the only race held.

== Schedule ==
The precise times of the events are not recorded. The 1500 metres was the final event of the second day.

Date		Round
Gregorian	Julian	Round
Tuesday, 7 April 1896	Tuesday, 26 March 1896	Final

== Results ==
Rank	Athlete	Nation	Time	Notes
1st place, gold medalist(s)	Edwin Flack	Australia	4:33.2	OR
2nd place, silver medalist(s)	Arthur Blake	United States	4:33.6	
3rd place, bronze medalist(s)	Albin Lermusiaux	France	4:36.0	
4	Carl Galle	Germany	4:39.0	
5	Angelos Fetsis	Greece	Unknown	
6	Dimitrios Golemis	Greece	Unknown	
7–8	Konstantinos Karakatsanis	Greece	Unknown	
7–8	Dimitrios Tomprof	Greece	Unknown	

== Notes ==
- Lampros, S.P.; Polites, N.G.; De Coubertin, Pierre; Philemon, P.J. & Anninos, C. (1897). The Olympic Games: BC 776 – AD 1896. Athens: Charles Beck. (Digitally available at la84foundation.org)
- Mallon, Bill & Widlund, Ture (1998). The 1896 Olympic Games. Results for All Competitors in All Events, with Commentary. Jefferson: McFarland. ISBN 978-0-7864-0379-0. (Excerpt available at la84foundation.org)
- Smith, Michael Llewellyn (2004). Olympics in Athens 1896. The Invention of the Modern Olympic Games. London: Profile Books. ISBN 978-1-86197-342-9.
