= Nándor Dáni =

Hungarian athlete (1871–1948)

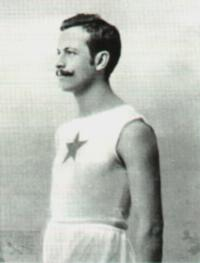
- Dáni in the 1890s

Personal information
- Born: 2 July 1871 Budapest, Austria-Hungary
- Died: 30 December 1948 (aged 77) Budapest, Hungary
Medal record
Men's athletics
Representing Hungary
Olympic Games
Silver medal – second place	1896 Athens	800 metres

Nándor János Dáni (Hungarian pronunciation: [ˈnaːndor ˈdaːni]; 2 July 1871 – 30 December 1948) was a Hungarian athlete. Domestically, he represented multiple sports clubs in multiple sports such as athletics, cycling, and speed skating. During his career, he set two national records in athletics, one in the 100 yards and the other in the 880 yards.

Later on, he was selected to compete for Hungary at the 1896 Summer Olympics. He was entered in four events, but only competed in the men's 800 metres. There, he earned the silver medal with a time of 2:11.8, earning Hungary's first Olympic medal. Later on, he was elected a member of the Hungarian Athletics Association and became the chairman of a carbonic acid factory.

== Biography ==
Nándor János Dáni was born on 2 July 1871 in Budapest, Austria-Hungary. He started competing in 1886 as a high school student, when he became one of the founding members of Sportkedvelők Köre. Later, he represented multiple sports clubs, including Magyar Atlétikai Club (MAC) in athletics and cycling, Neptun Evezős Egyesület in rowing, and Budapesti Korcsolyázó Egylet in speed skating. As a cyclist, he won two editions of a road race competition in 1891 and 1892. As a speed skater, he won a competition in 1893. He fully transitioned to practicing athletics upon the end of his cycling career.

He set a Hungarian record in 1894 in the 100 yards with a time of 10.3 seconds and this record remained unbroken for nine years. He also ran a Hungarian record-setting time of 2:05.5 in the 880 yards and it lasted for fourteen years. Dáni was later selected to compete for Hungary at the 1896 Summer Olympics in Athens, Greece. He qualified upon competing at the Hungarian national trials for the Summer Games and won the men's 400, 800, and 1500 metres events. There, he was entered in the men's 100 metres, 400 metres, 1500 metres, and long jump, but did not compete in any of the four events. He only competed in the men's 800 metres.

He competed in the heats on 6 April against three other competitors. There, he was placed second with a time of 2:10.2 and qualified for the finals. In the finals on 9 April, he was placed second with a time of 2:11.8, placing behind Edwin Flack of Australia who had set an Olympic record in the distance. His silver medal win earned for Hungary its first Olympic medal. While some contemporary commentators regarded him as a favourite to win the 800 metres event, he suffered a sprain prior to the final during one of his training sessions in the long jump.

After his career in sport, he was elected a member of the Hungarian Athletics Association. He also became the director and then chairman of a carbonic acid factory. Dáni died on 30 December 1948 in Budapest.
