= SNCF Class 241P =

Class of French steam locomotives

SNCF 241.P
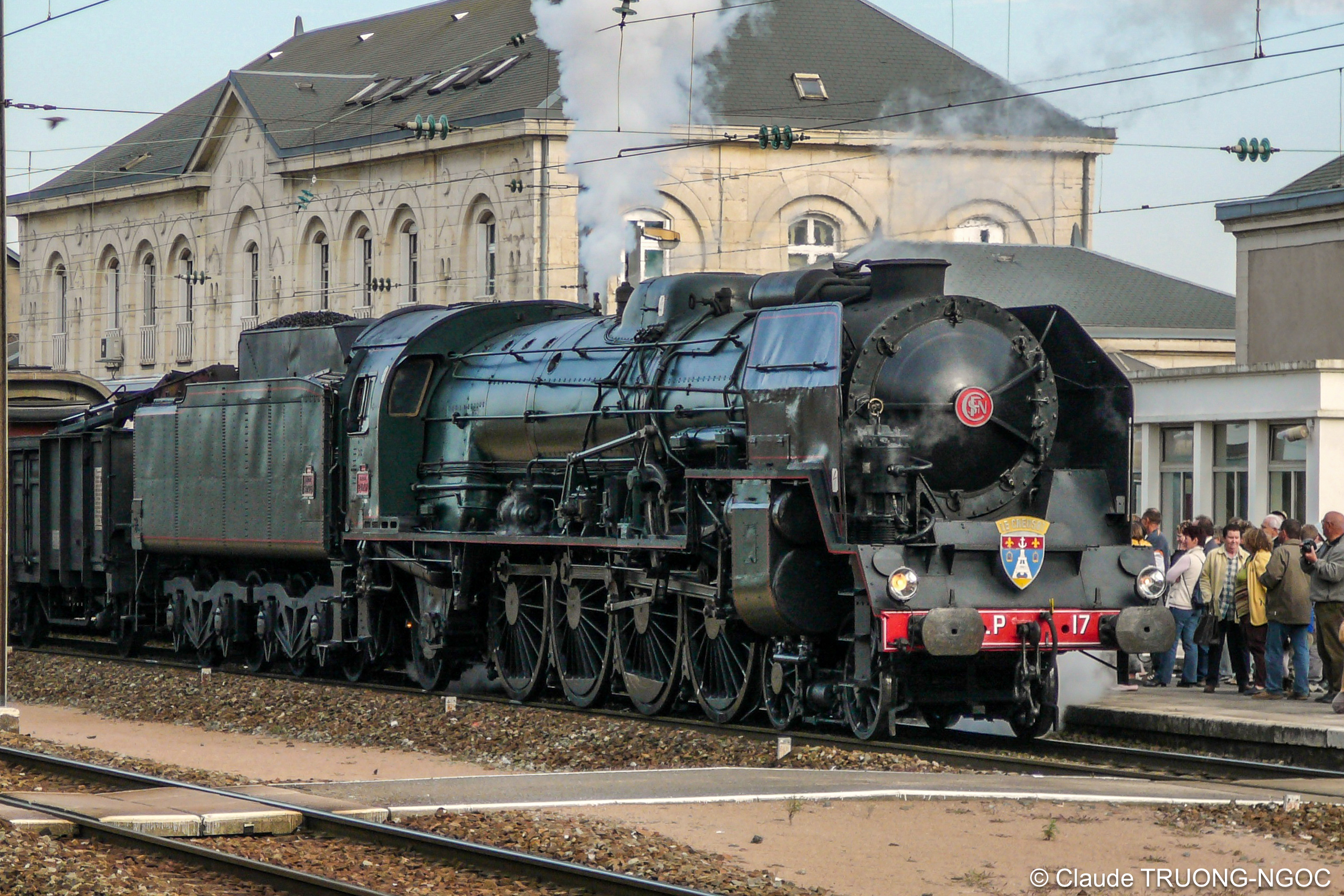
- Preserved 241.P.17
Type and origin
- Power type: steam
- Builder: Schneider et Cie, Le Creusot
- Serial number: 4903–4937
- Build date: May 1948 – June 1952
Specifications
- Configuration
  - Whyte: 4-8-2
  - UIC: 2′D1′ h4v
- Leading dia.: 1,000 mm (39.37 in)
- Driver dia.: 2,000 mm (78.74 in)
- Trailing dia.: 1,330 mm (52.36 in)
- Length: 27.117 m (89 ft 0 in)
- Adhesive weight: 81.6 t (80.3 long tons; 89.9 short tons)
- Loco weight: 131.4 t (129.3 long tons; 144.8 short tons)
- Tender weight: 81.6 t (80.3 long tons; 89.9 short tons)
- Total weight: 215.4 t (212.0 long tons; 237.4 short tons)
- Fuel capacity: 12 t (11.8 long tons; 13.2 short tons) coal
- Water cap.: 34,050 L (7,490 imp gal; 9,000 US gal)
- Firebox
  - Grate area: 5.052 m^{2} (54.38 sq ft)
- Boiler pressure: 20 kg/cm^{2} (1.96 MPa; 284 psi)
- Heating surface: 244.57 m^{2} (2,632.5 sq ft)
- Cylinders: 4 (2 H.P., 2 L.P.)
- High-pressure cylinder: 446 mm × 650 mm (17.56 in × 25.59 in)
- Low-pressure cylinder: 674 mm × 700 mm (26.54 in × 27.56 in)
Performance figures
- Maximum speed: 120 km/h (75 mph) max. service speed
- Power output: 4,000 hp (3,000 kW)
- Tractive effort: 202.66 kN (45,560 lbf)
Career
- Number in class: 35

The SNCF 241.P is a 4-8-2 'Mountain' type express passenger steam locomotive that ran on the Société Nationale des Chemins de fer Français, (French National Railways) from 1948 until 1973. Introduced as large scale electrification of the SNCF was already underway, they were the last new class of passenger steam locomotives in France.

== History ==
In 1944, SNCF reviewed its predicted postwar traffic requirements and determined a requirement for a locomotive capable of hauling passenger trains of 700–800 tonnes at 120 km/h (75 mph), and capable of climbing gradients of 1 in 125 (8‰).

A prototype 4-8-2 four cylinder compound locomotive, the 241.C.1, had been built by Schneider et Cie. in 1930 for the former Chemins de fer de Paris à Lyon et à la Méditerranée (PLM). This locomotive was utilised as the basis for the new class, but with some key design changes including the addition of an automatic stoker, strengthened frames, and boiler modifications.

=== Production ===
35 locomotives were built by Schneider et Cie., of Le Creusot between 1948 and 1952.

=== Service life ===
The class was initially assigned to the line between Paris and Marseille, hauling services including the famous Le Mistral expresses, but within a few years they were displaced by electrification. Most of the class was then transferred to the Nord, l'Est and l'Ouest regions. For over ten years they managed the traffic on the line west of Le Mans, including the 411 km (255.4 mi) line to Brest and 410 km (254.8 mi) line to Quimper. They hauled trains of up to 16 coaches, weighing over 800 tons.

The 241.P class were allocated to the following depots:

- South-eastern Region: Dijon, Marseille-Blancarde, Lyon-Mouche, Nevers
- Eastern Region: la Villette, Noisy-le-Sec, Chaumont
- Northern Region: La Chapelle (Gare du Nord)
- Western Region: Le Mans

Although powerful, the class was not without its problems. The frames, lightly constructed to avoid excessive axle load, were not able to handle the power of the cylinders and flexing of the frame under load led to problems such as hot axle boxes. The class also suffered from leaking boiler tubes after passing over points, which necessitated structural reinforcement.

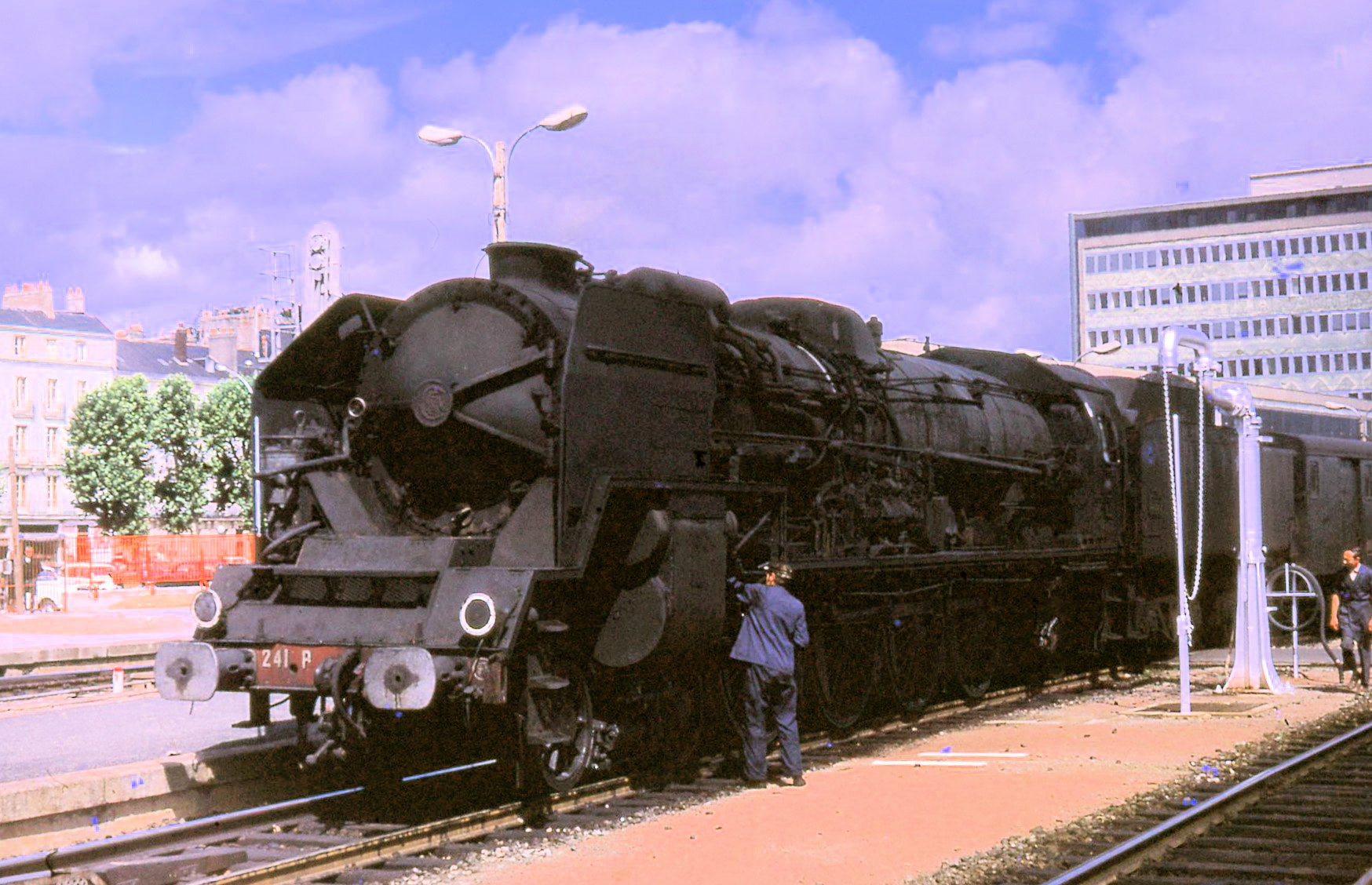
241.P.17 at Nantes station during the class's last regular summer of operation, August 1969.

The class was withdrawn progressively from service from 1965 for 241.P.1 to 1973 for 241.P.16. Their last regular work, on the Le Mans to Nantes route, ended in early 1970. The class was nicknamed the grosses P to distinguish them from the 141.P Class, which were called the petites P.

=== Preservation ===
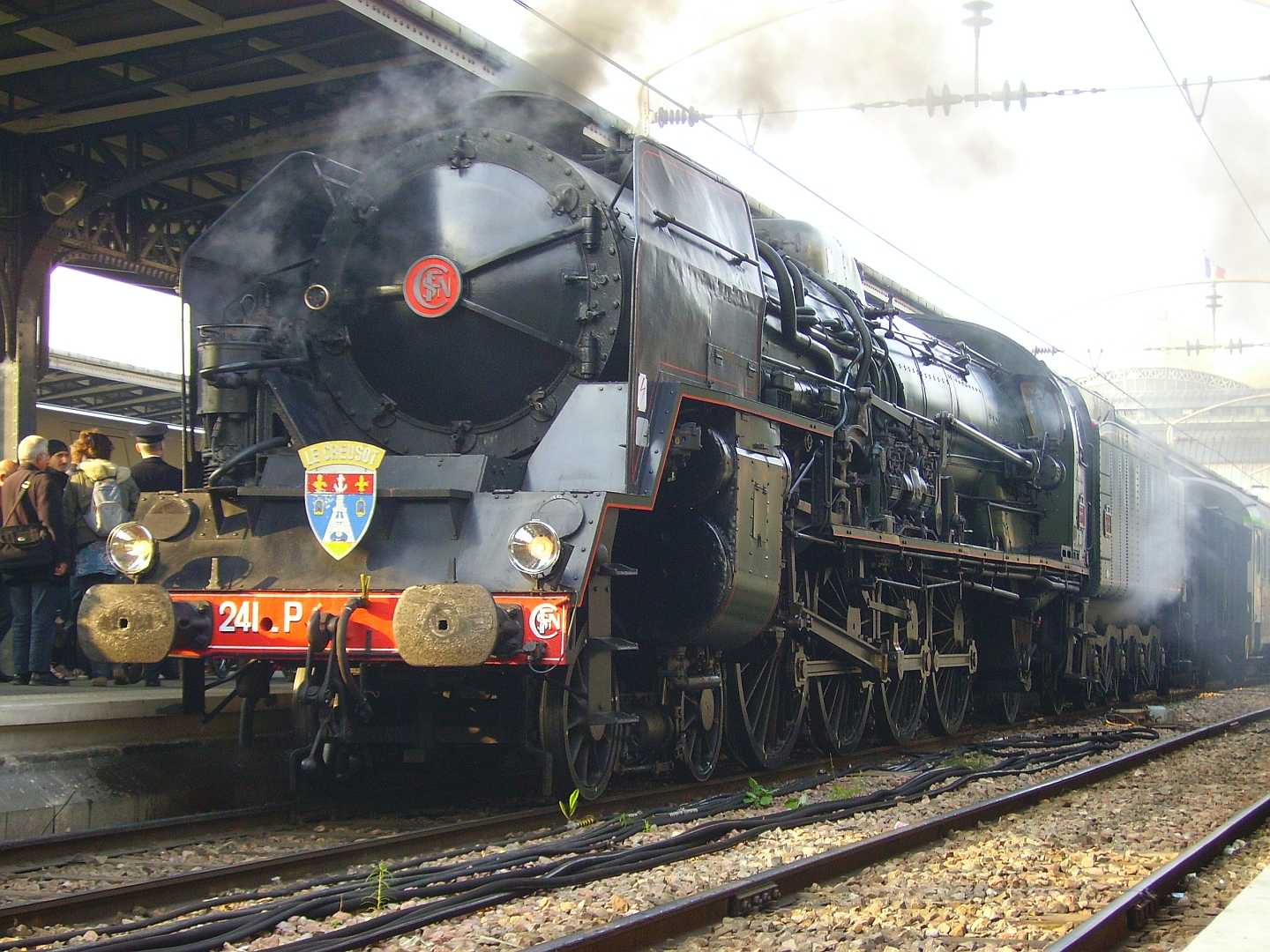
241.P.17 at Paris Gare de l'Est, 8 May 2010

Four 241.Ps have been preserved:

- 241.P.9, withdrawn in 1973 and placed in storage in Guîtres, was transferred from Bordeaux to Toulouse on 7 December 2008 and is the subject of a restoration project by AAATV-MP
- 241.P.16, withdrawn in 1973, is on display at the Cité du train (National Railway Museum of France) in Mulhouse
- 241.P.17, preserved at Le Creusot and restored to working operation in April 2006, is authorised to run on SNCF tracks with passengers, after a 13-year restoration project and since then travel across France and sometimes Switzerland few times a year. It is classed as a Monument historique
- 241.P.30, withdrawn in 1969 and transferred to the French-Swiss border town of Vallorbe for public display, was transferred again in 1997 to Saint-Sulpice, Neuchâtel, Switzerland, and into the care of the Vapeur Val-de-Travers group for static preservation In 2019 the locomotive was acquired by AJECTA and transported to Longueville.
