= Athletics at the 1896 Summer Olympics – Men's 800 metres =

Men's 800 metres at the Games of the I Olympiad
- Venue: Panathinaiko Stadium
- Dates: April 6 (heats); April 9 (final)
- Competitors: 9 from 6 nations
- Winning time: 2:11.0

Medalists
1st place, gold medalist(s)		Edwin Flack; Australia
2nd place, silver medalist(s)		Nándor Dáni; Hungary
3rd place, bronze medalist(s)		Dimitrios Golemis; Greece

The men's 800 metres race was the second-longest of the four flat-track events on the Athletics at the 1896 Summer Olympics programme. The preliminary heats were the third event held on 6 April. The nine competitors were split into two groups. The top two athletes in each heat advanced to the final, which was held on 9 April.

== Background ==
This was the first appearance of the event, which is one of 12 athletics events to have been held at every Summer Olympics. The unofficial world record holder: Charles Kilpatrick of the United States, did not compete in Athens. Edwin Flack of Australia was the favourite among those who competed.

== Competition format ==
The competition consisted of two rounds, heats and a final. There were two heats, scheduled to have 7 runners each. The top two runners in each heat advanced to the final.

The track was 330 metres in circumference (unlike modern tracks which are 400 metres), so the race was more than two laps. The track had very sharp turns and was made of loose cinders, making running difficult. Runners turned clockwise rather than the current counterclockwise turns.

== Records ==
World record	Charles Kilpatrick (USA)	1:53.4 (y)(u)	New York City, United States	21 September 1895
Olympic record	New event	n/a	n/a	n/a

Edwin Flack set the initial Olympic record of 2:10.0 in the first heat; that time was not beaten in the second heat or the final.

== Schedule ==
The precise times of the events are not recorded. For the first round, the heats were the third event of the day on Monday. The final was held during the afternoon session on Thursday, which began at 2:30 p.m.; it was the first event of the session.

Date		Round
Gregorian	Julian	Round
Monday, 6 April 1896	Monday, 25 March 1896	Round 1
Thursday, 9 April 1896	Thursday, 28 March 1896	Final

== Results ==
=== Semifinals ===
The two heats of the preliminary round were held on 6 April. The top two runners in each heat advanced.

==== Semifinal 1 ====
Flack beat Dáni by four feet, with Traun a further 20 yards behind in third. Flack's time of 2:10.0 was the inaugural Olympic record.

Rank	Athlete	Nation	Time	Notes
1	Edwin Flack	Australia	2:10.0	Q, OR
2	Nándor Dáni	Hungary	2:10.2	Q
3	Friedrich Traun	Germany	2:13.4	
4	George Marshall	Great Britain	Unknown	

==== Semifinal 2 ====
Lermusiaux beat Golemis by 1¼ yards.

Rank	Athlete	Nation	Time	Notes
1	Albin Lermusiaux	France	2:16.6	Q
2	Dimitrios Golemis	Greece	2:16.8	Q
3	Georges de la Nézière	France	Unknown	
4	Angelos Fetsis	Greece	Unknown	
5	Dimitrios Tomprof	Greece	Unknown	

=== Final ===
Lermusiaux scratched from the final to save himself for the marathon. Flack beat Dáni by five meters, easing up, with Golemis finishing a further 90 meters back in third.

Rank	Athlete	Nation	Time
1st place, gold medalist(s)	Edwin Flack	Australia	2:11.0
2nd place, silver medalist(s)	Nándor Dáni	Hungary	2:11.8
3rd place, bronze medalist(s)	Dimitrios Golemis	Greece	2:28.0
–	Albin Lermusiaux	France	DNS

== Results summary ==
Rank	Athlete	Nation	Semifinal	Final	Notes
1st place, gold medalist(s)	Edwin Flack	Australia	2:10.0	2:11.0	OR
2nd place, silver medalist(s)	Nándor Dáni	Hungary	2:10.2	2:11.8	
3rd place, bronze medalist(s)	Dimitrios Golemis	Greece	2:16.8	2:28.0	
—	Albin Lermusiaux	France	2:16.6	DNS	
5	Friedrich Traun	Germany	2:13.4	Did not advance	
6	Georges de la Nézière	France	Unknown	Did not advance	3rd in semifinal
7	Angelos Fetsis	Greece	Unknown	Did not advance	4th in semifinal
7	George Marshall	Great Britain	Unknown	Did not advance	4th in semifinal
9	Dimitrios Tomprof	Greece	Unknown	Did not advance	5th in semifinal
