= Arthur Blake (distance runner) =

American middle-distance runner

Olympic medal record

Men's athletics

Representing the United States
Silver medal – second place	1896 Athens	1500 metres

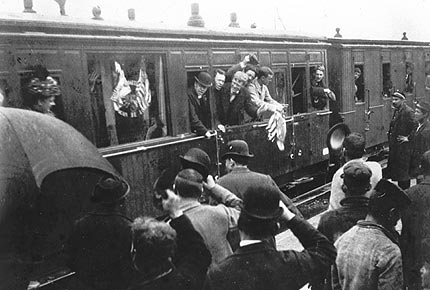

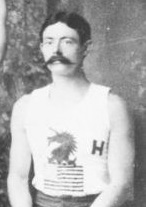
Blake in 1896

Arthur Charles "Skipper" Blake (January 26, 1872 – October 23, 1944) was an American athlete who competed in the 1500 meters and the marathon at the 1896 Summer Olympics in Athens.

== Biography ==
Blake was born on January 26, 1872, in Boston, Massachusetts.

Blake competed for the Boston Athletic Association and it was after a 1000-yard race he said in jest "I'm too good for Boston, I ought to go over and run the Marathon, at Athens, in the Olympic Games", the comment was overheard by stockbroker Arthur Burnham, who then offered to finance a US team over to Greece.

At the 1896 Olympics, the 1500 meters was run in a single heat, and Blake came in second to Edwin Flack of Australia. The race was a tight one, as Flack and Blake overtook the then-leader, Albin Lermusiaux, in the final straight and ran side-by-side nearly all the way to the finish. Flack proved the quicker, however, and finished in 4:33.2. This was less than a second faster than Blake's time of 4:33.6.

He also ran in the final event of the Games, the marathon. Blake, the only American entrant in the race, was in third place to Lermusiaux and Flack throughout the first half of the race. After 23 kilometres, however, Blake was unable to continue and quit the race.

After he stopped competing in athletics he became an insurance salesman and settled down in Dedham, Massachusetts, he was also a keen golfer and sailor.

In the 1984 NBC miniseries, The First Olympics: Athens 1896 he was portrayed by Alex Hyde-White.

He graduated from Harvard University.

Blake died on October 23, 1944, in Boston, Massachusetts, at the age of 72.
