= Dimitrios Golemis =

Greek middle-distance runner

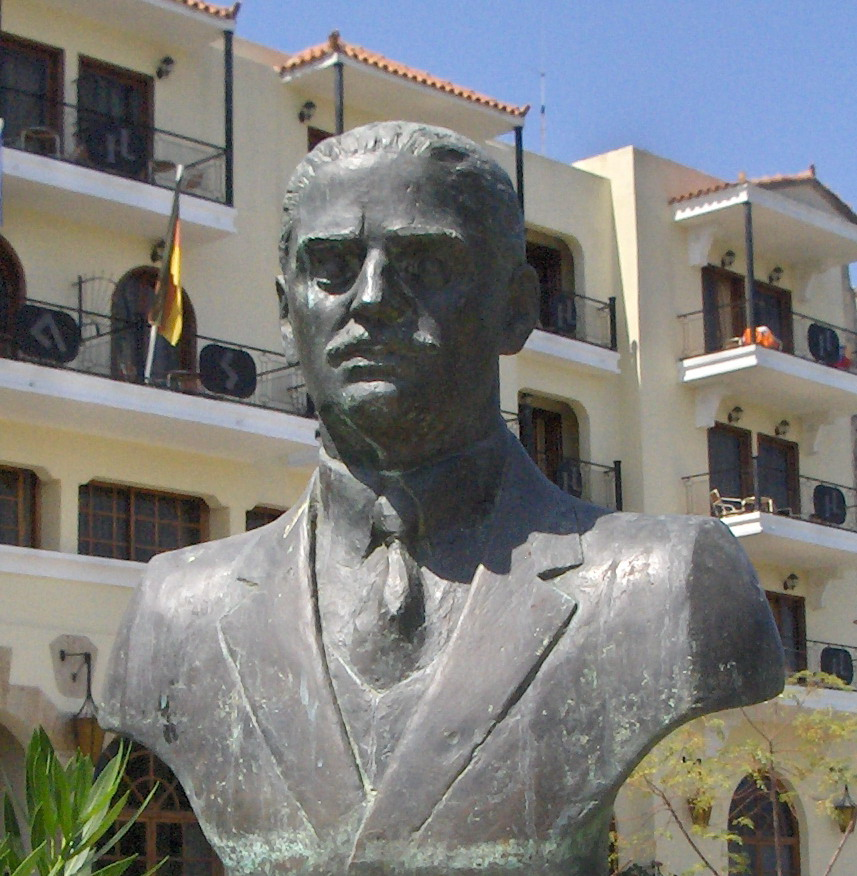
- Statue of Dimitrios Golemis in Lefkada

Personal information
- Nationality: Greece
- Born: 15 November 1874 Lefkada, Greece
- Died: 9 January 1941 (aged 66)

Sport
- Sport: Track running
- Event: 800 metres
Medal record
Men's athletics
Representing Greece
Olympic Games
Bronze medal – third place	1896 Athens	800 metres

Dimitrios (or Demetrius) P. Golemis (Greek: Δημήτριος Γολέμης; 15 November 1874 – 9 January 1941) was a Greek athlete. He competed at the 1896 Summer Olympics in Athens.

== Biography ==
Golemis competed in the 800 metres. He finished second in his preliminary heat to advance to the final. There, he came in last of the three finalists who started the race, as Albin Lermusiaux of France withdrew from the final after defeating Golemis in the heats. Golemis's third-place finish earned him a bronze medal (assigned retroactively by the International Olympic Committee, as no award was given for third place at the time).

He also competed in the 1500 metres. He finished in the bottom half of the eight runners who took part in the single race of the event, though his exact position is unclear.
