= PLM 241.C.1 =

PLM 241.C
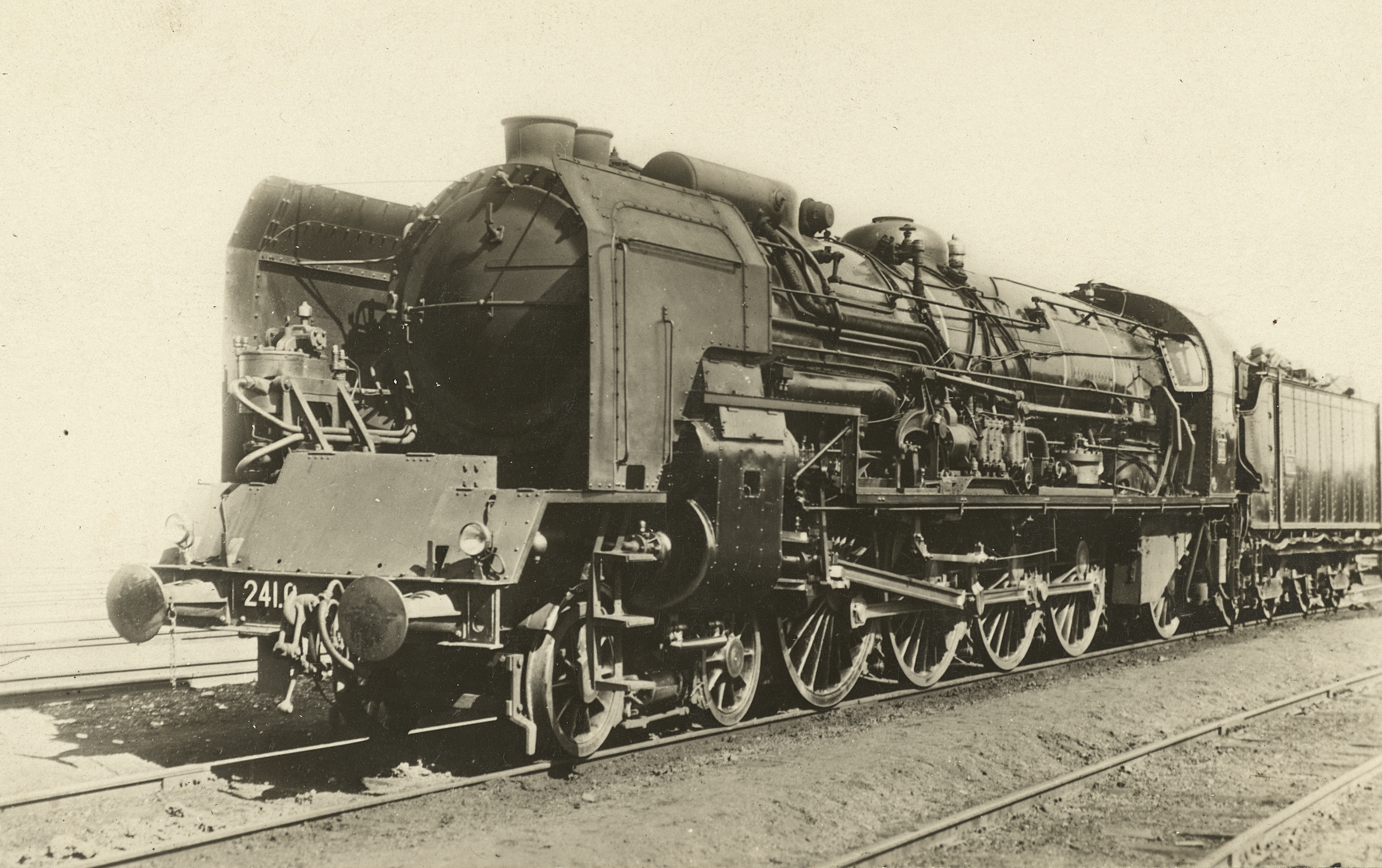
- The 241.C.1 in 1932.
Type and origin
- Power type: Steam
- Builder: Schneider et Cie
- Serial number: 4530
- Build date: December 1930
- Total produced: 1
Specifications
- Configuration
  - Whyte: 4-8-2
  - UIC: 2′D1′ h4v
- Leading dia.: 1,000 mm (3 ft 3 3/8 in)
- Driver dia.: 2,000 mm (6 ft 6 3/4 in)
- Trailing dia.: 1,360 mm (4 ft 5 1/2 in)
- Length: Loco: 17,100 mm (56 ft 1 1/4 in)
- Loco weight: Empty: 113.4 tonnes (111.6 long tons; 125.0 short tons); Loaded: 126.6 tonnes (124.6 long tons; 139.6 short tons)
- Fuel type: Coal
- Firebox
  - Grate area: 5.06 m^{2} (54.5 sq ft)
- Boiler pressure: 20 kg/cm^{2} (1.96 MPa; 284 psi)
- Heating surface: 248 m^{2} (2,670 sq ft)
- Superheater
  - Type: 33-element
  - Heating area: 90.9 m^{2} (978 sq ft)
- Cylinders: Four, compound: high pressure inside, low pressure outside
- High-pressure cylinder: 450 mm × 650 mm (17 11/16 in × 25 9/16 in)
- Low-pressure cylinder: 680 mm × 700 mm (26 3/4 in × 27 9/16 in)
Performance figures
- Maximum speed: 120 km/h (75 mph)
Career
- Operators: Chemins de fer de Paris à Lyon et à la Méditerranée; SNCF
- Numbers: 241.C.1
- Retired: 1960
- Scrapped: 1962

PLM 241.C.1 was a French four-cylinder 4-8-2 (Mountain) compound steam locomotive, built as a prototype for the Chemins de fer de Paris à Lyon et à la Méditerranée.

The firm of Schneider et Cie took charge of the construction of the locomotive in 1930.

It was based on the earlier PLM 241.A, but with several modifications to increase the design speed from 110 to 120 kilometres per hour (68 to 75 mph):

- The diameter of the driving wheels was increased from 1,790 to 2,000 mm (5 ft 10 1/2 in to 6 ft 6 3/4 in);
- The crankshaft was modified, and the connecting rods were now attached to the second and third pairs of driving wheels whereas on the 241.A they were attached to the first and second; this necessitated the inside high pressure cylinders be located between the first and second driving axles;

In addition the steam dome was moved forward to be just behind the chimney.

In 1932, the single PLM trefle exhaust was replaced by a double cross-type. A standard smokebox door replaced the paraboloid-shaped original and smoke deflectors were added at the same time.

The locomotive passed to the SNCF in 1938, who renumbered it 5-241.C.1.

It was retired in 1960, and scrapped two years later, having outlasted the other PLM mountains by a decade; despite it being the only member of its type, although it did form the basis of the SNCF 241.P. Some of its features were integrated into the fifty 241.D and the one 241.E rebuilds of the PLM 241.A locomotives.

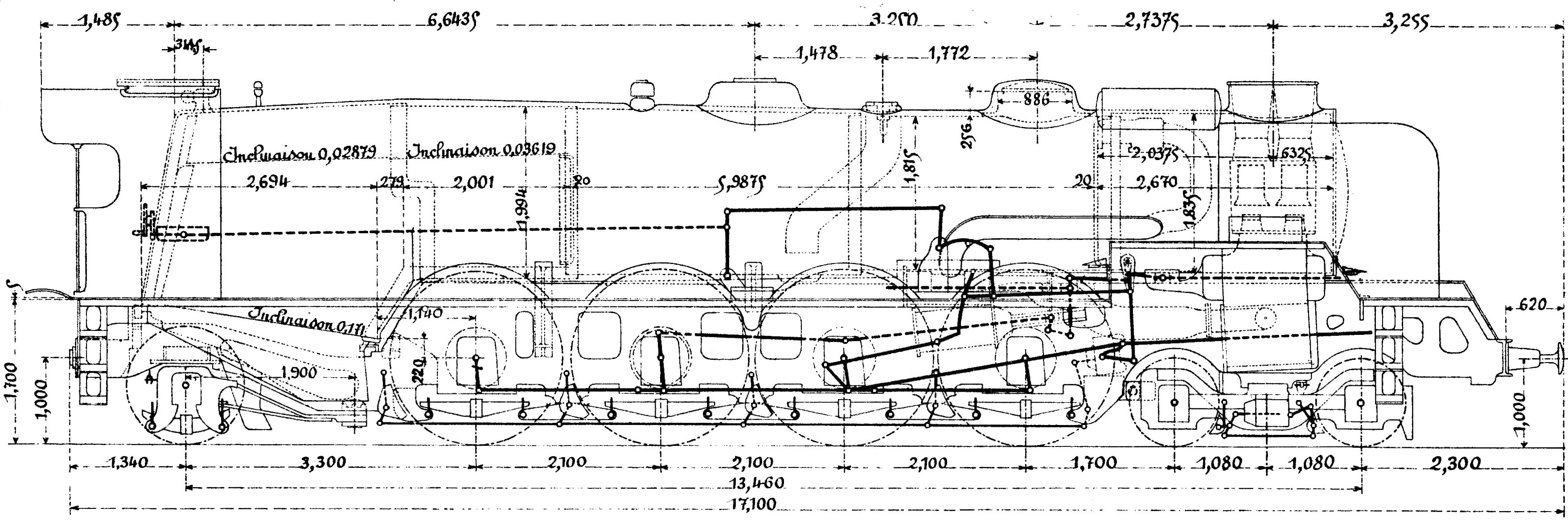
The 241.C.1 in 1925.

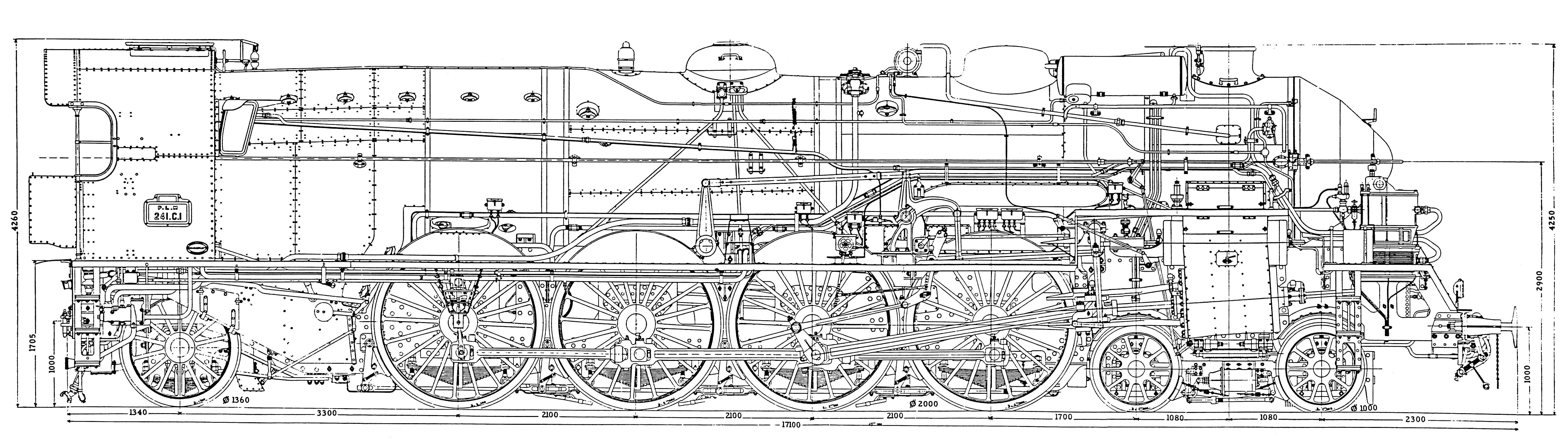
The 241.C.1 in 1932.

== Models ==
The PLM 241.C.1 has been reproduced in HO scale by:

- La Maison des trains – metal body often mounted on a commercial chassis from Jouef, Fleischmann or Märklin;
- Jouef Club in 1991 – limited edition;
- Loco-diffusion – as a brass kit.
