= Georges de la Nézière =

French athlete

Personal information
- Born: 31 July 1878 Paris, France
- Died: 9 October 1914 (aged 36) Monchy-au-Bois, France
- Height: 172 cm (5 ft 8 in)

Sport
- Country: France
- Sport: Track and field

Georges Daviel de La Nézière (18 July 1878 – 9 October 1914) was a French athlete, who competed at the 1896 Summer Olympics in Athens, and was killed in action during World War I.

Nézière was born in 1878, and had two older brothers who would be painters and illustrators, Joseph de La Nézière and Raymond de La Nézière, he went to boarding school where he excelled in athletics, and was Paris schools cross country champion. In 1896 he was delegated to travel to Athens to participate in the 1896 Summer Olympics, he competed in the 800 metres, and even though he was still 17 years, old he managed to finish third in his heat, but only the first two in each heat qualified for the final.

Near the turn of the century Nézière had a big interest in automobiles, and when he was enlisted for his years national service in 1899 he had to assist in building a car that could carry a Maxim gun for large scale manoeuvres, later on he would try to build his own airplane which caused him serious financial difficulties before working for a large private telephone company.

At the outbreak of World War I, he was recalled to serve his country and joined 11 Company as a corporal which was part of 84 Division. He was killed by machine gun fire on 9 October 1914 in the forest of Mouchy, ten miles from Arras, leaving behind a wife and two children.

== See also ==
- List of Olympians killed in World War I
