= Hôtel de Ville, Noisy-le-Sec =

Town hall in Noisy-le-Sec, France

Hôtel de Ville
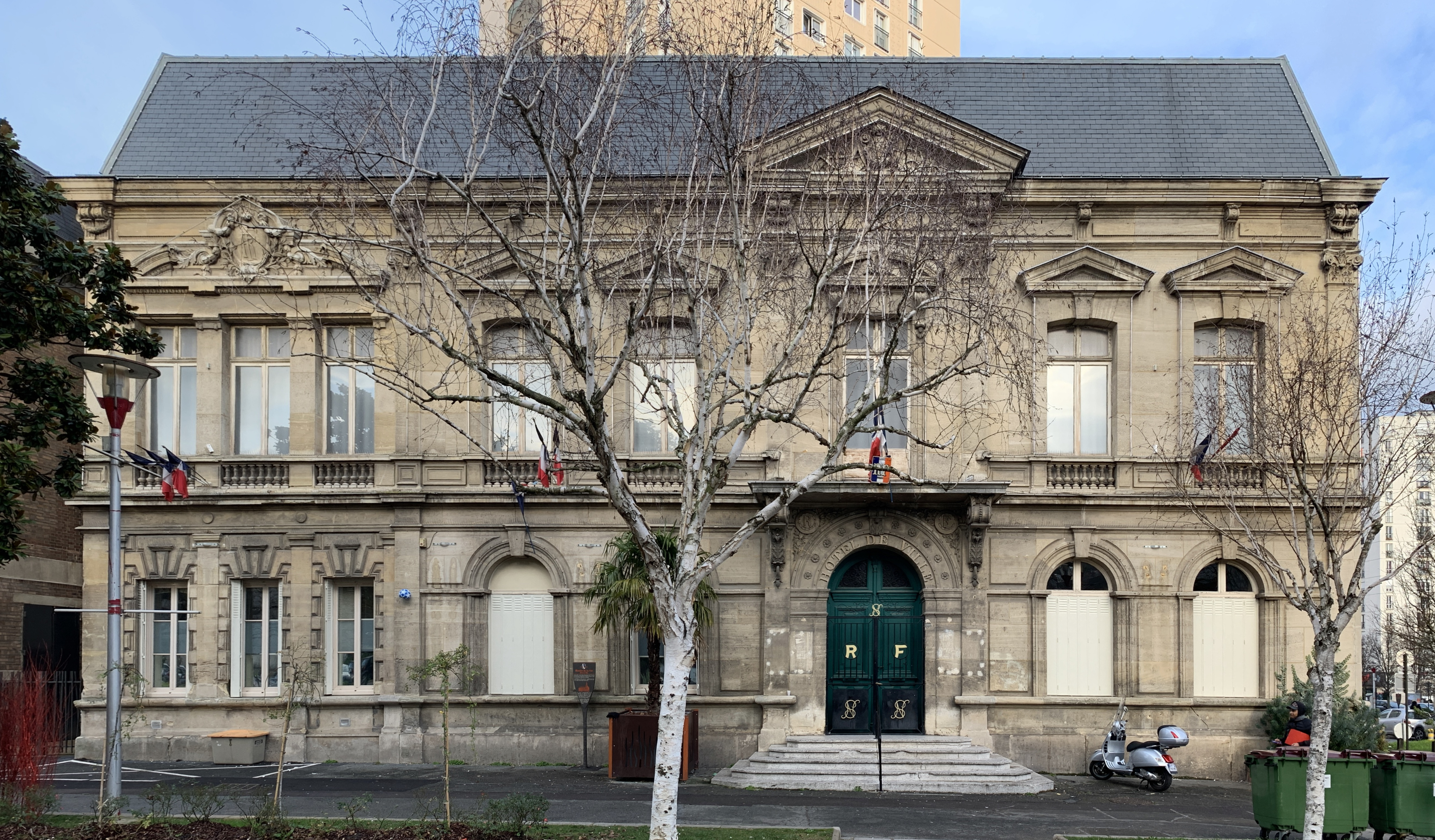
- The main frontage of the Hôtel de Ville in January 2021
- Interactive map of the Hôtel de Ville area

General information
- Type: City hall
- Architectural style: Neoclassical style
- Location: Noisy-le-Sec, France
- Coordinates: 48.8898°N 2.4521°E
- Completed: 1846

Design and construction
- Architect: Paul-Eugène Lequeux

The Hôtel de Ville (French pronunciation: [otɛl də vil], City Hall) is a municipal building in Noisy-le-Sec, Seine-Saint-Denis, in the northeastern suburbs of Paris, standing on Place du Maréchal Foch.

== History ==
Following the French Revolution, the town council initially met in the home of the mayor at the time. This arrangement continued until 1820, when the council started renting a small office in some stables. After the stables became dilapidated, the council acquired the home of Sieur Jeoffroy on the east side of the town square in December 1833. After that building was deemed too cramped, the council decided to commission a dedicated town hall. The site they selected was the home of the Blancheteau family, situated on the corner of the town square and Rue du Goulet (now Rue Anatole-France), which was acquired in May 1844.

The foundation stone for the new building was laid by Louis Antoine Blancheteau, who was a deputy mayor of the town. It was designed by Paul-Eugène Lequeux in the neoclassical style, built in ashlar stone and was officially opened in 1846.

The original design involved a symmetrical main frontage of five bays facing onto Place de la Mairie (now Place du Maréchal Foch). The central bay featured a short flight of steps leading up to a round headed doorway with a moulded surround. The doorway was flanked by brackets supporting a balcony and there was a French door surmounted by a segmental pediment on the first floor. The French door was flanked by Ionic order pilasters supporting a triangular pediment with a coat of arms in the tympanum. The other bays were fenestrated by round headed windows with archivolts and keystones on the ground floor and by casement windows with keystones and triangular pediments on the first floor. Internally, the principal room was the Salle des Mariages (wedding room), which featured a coffered ceiling decorated by Jean-Constant Pape and featuring local scenes.

In 1849, a small fountain, also designed by Paul-Eugène Lequeux, was erected to the east of the town hall. It featured a lion's mouth, through which the water flowed, and it was surmounted by a statue of Joan of Arc. The building was extended to the northwest by three extra bays and to the southeast by two extra bays, to accommodate an office for the mayor and a new assembly hall, in 1879. A large annex was erected to the northwest of the original structure between 1933 and 1934. The annex incorporated a new Salle des Fêtes (ballroom).

On the night of 18/19 April 1944, during the Second World War, allied aircraft dropped large quantities of bombs in the area while targeting the local marshalling yard: the annex to the town hall was devastated in these attacks. During the Paris insurrection, members of the French Resistance seized the town hall on 19 August 1944. This was a week before the official liberation of the town by the French 2nd Armoured Division, commanded by General Philippe Leclerc, on 25 August 1944. After the war a plaque was placed on the wall of the town hall to commemorate the life of Léon Lochin: he was a council employee who was arrested, deported and executed at Auschwitz concentration camp on 31 December 1944. Another plaque was erected to commemorate the life of Joseph Anatole François: he was a councillor who was arrested, deported and executed at Leonberg on 11 January 1945.

The two extra bays at the southeast end of the original building were demolished to facilitate the widening of Rue Anatole-France in 1970.
