= Angelos Fetsis =

Greek middle-distance runner (1878–1968)

Personal information
- Born: 1878 Lefkada
- Died: 16 October 1968 Palaio Faliro
- Resting place: Agia Varvara

Angelos Fetsis (Greek: Άγγελος Φέτσης, 1878 – 16 October 1968) was a Greek athlete.

== Biography ==
Fetsis born in 1878 to Ionnis Fetsis and Smaragda Filippa, and was originally from the village of Lefkada, but he moved with his family to the Athenian district of Kallithea in 1891. He began his education at the Primary School of Lefkada, he then attended the Varvakeio High School, which he graduated from aged 18. He then joined the National Gymnastics Association and became a gymnastics teacher after training at the Athens School of Gymnasts.

He was a member of the Athlitikos Omilos Athinon, and in March 1896, he won the 800 and 1500 metres races of the Panhellenic Athletics Championships, which selected the Greek athletes for the 1896 Olympic Games. He won the 800 metre race at the Panellenic Athletics Championships with a time of 2:22.2. In the Olympics, he competed in the 800 metres. He did not get a qualifying placement in his preliminary heat to get him to the final. In the 1500 metres, he also failed to qualify for the finals.

Fetsis studied law at the University of Athens, during which time he was temporarily a reserve second lieutenant. In 1905, he was invited to Cairo to work at the Ifitos Gymnastics Club, a club for the Greek diaspora in Cairo, and in 1906, he organized the First Pan-Egyptian Games. He also published a book, The Physical Education of Youth. In 1907, he founded the Diagoras Athletic Club. In 1910, after the dissolution of his club, Athlitikos Omolis Athinon, he joined Ethnikos G.S. Athens. He opened a gymnasium in Makrygianni, Athens. In 1908, he founded the O Aris Shooting Club.

Beginning in 1909, he began the publication of a magazine titled NIKH; its service was interrupted by various wars and it ceased publication in 1928. In 1912, he was called into military service for the First Balkan War. in Epirus. On 24 February, Parga was captured. He was the first officer to enter the city with his men. In 1914 he married Aglaia, a daughter of a wealthy lord in Parga; she died in 1915 in childbirth. Fetsis was given the Silver Cross of the Order of the Saviour (1924), the Gold Cross of the Order of the Phoenix (1949) and the Medal for the Greco-Turkish War of 1912–1913.

Fetsis died on 16 October 1968, in Palaio Faliro and was buried at the church of Agia Varvara. A mountain race organized since 2014 in Parga is dedicated to him because of his liberation of the city.
