= Dimitrios Tombrof =

Greek middle-distance runner

Dimitrios Tomprof (March 5, 1878 - ?) was a Greek athlete. He competed at the 1896 Summer Olympics in Athens.

Tomprof, of Smyrna in the Ottoman Empire, placed either fourth or fifth in his preliminary heat of the 800 metres, though records do not indicate whether he was ahead or behind countryman Angelos Fetsis. Neither advanced to the final, however, as a second-place finish was required for advancement.

He also competed in the 1,500 metres. He placed in the bottom half of the eight runners who took part in the single race of the event, though his exact placing is unclear.
