= Albin Lermusiaux =

French athlete

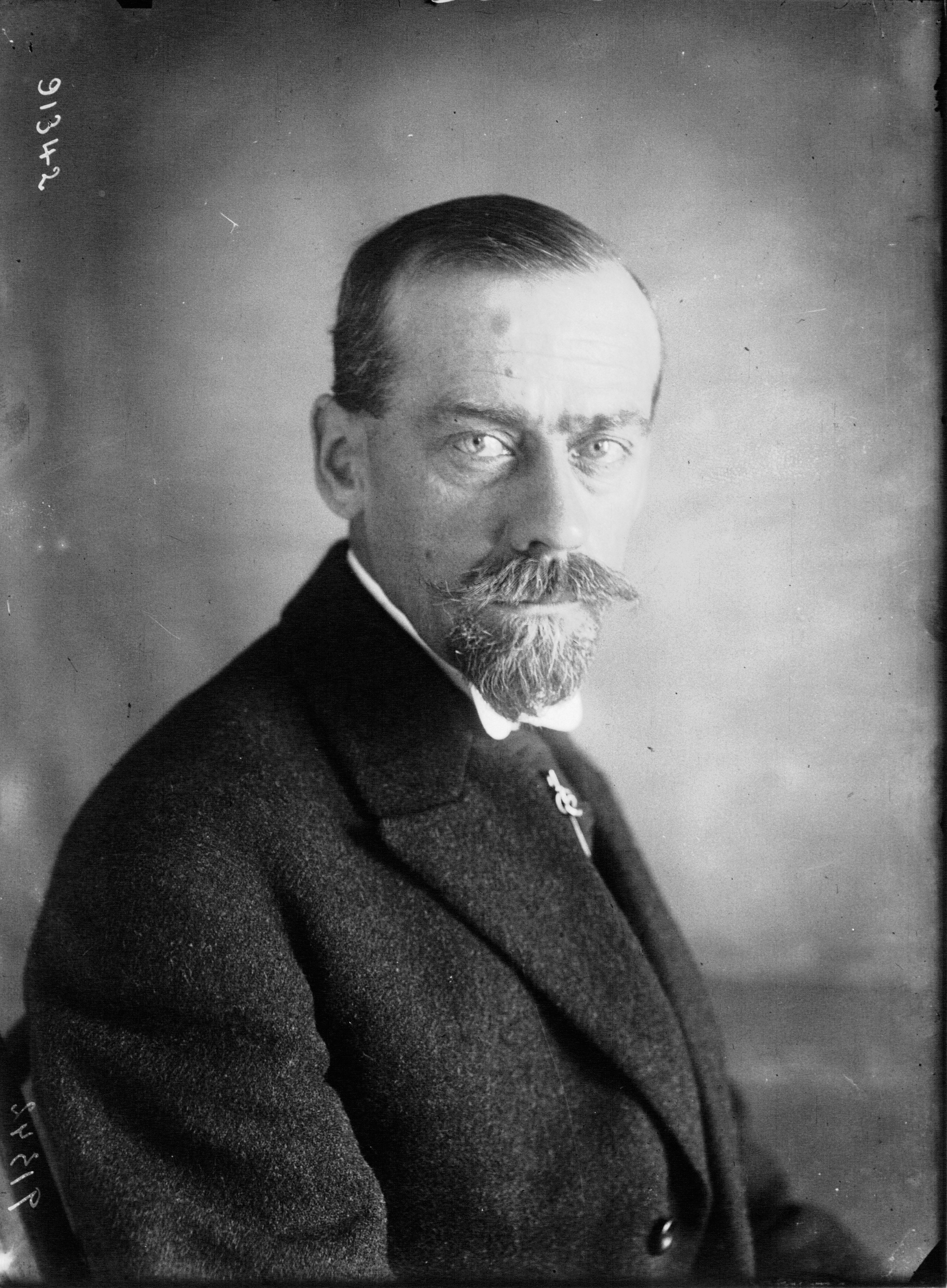
- Albin Lermusiaux in 1921

Personal information
- Born: 9 August 1874 Noisy-le-Sec, France
- Died: 20 January 1940 (aged 65) Maisons-Laffitte, France

Sport
- Sport: Athletics
- Events: 800 m – marathon, shooting
- Club: Racing Club de France, Paris

Achievements and titles
- Personal bests: 1500 m – 4:07.0 (1895); 5000 m – 15:47.8 (1895); 10000 m – 35:45.5 (1895)
Medal record
Representing France
Olympic Games
Bronze medal – third place	1896 Athens	1500 metres

Albin Georges Lermusiaux (9 August 1874 – 20 January 1940) was a French athlete and sport shooter who competed at the 1896 Summer Olympics in Athens.

== Career ==
In total Lermusiaux competed in four different events at the 1896 Summer Olympics, he won his preliminary heat of the 800 metres with a time of 2:16.6, he withdrew from the final which was to take place three days later but decided to save himself for the marathon which was taking place a day after the 800 metres final. In the 1500 metres event, which was conducted in a single race, Lermusiaux led from the start, but in the final straight was passed by Edwin Flack and Arthur Blake, and finished third.

On 10 April, Lermusiaux along with another 16 runners competed in the marathon, up to the 20 km mark the Frenchman was leading the race, but with the poor roads, heat and uphill grade runners started to drop out, Lermusiaux staggered to a stop and received an alcohol rub by an attendant, when he tried to resume he knew he would not finish so withdrew at the 32 km mark.

Lermusiaux also competed in the military rifle shooting event, Lermusiaux's place and score are unknown, but it is known he was not among the top 13 in the 42-man competitions.

Domestically Lermusiaux was affiliated with Racing Club de France and won the French championships in cross country (1895) and 1500 m (1896) and set national records, which were at the time also European records over 1500 m (in 1895 at 4:18.4 and in 1896 at 4:10.4), 1 mile (in 1895 at 4:37.4), and 3000 m (in 1895 at 9:22.4).
