= Noisy-le-Sec =

- Commune
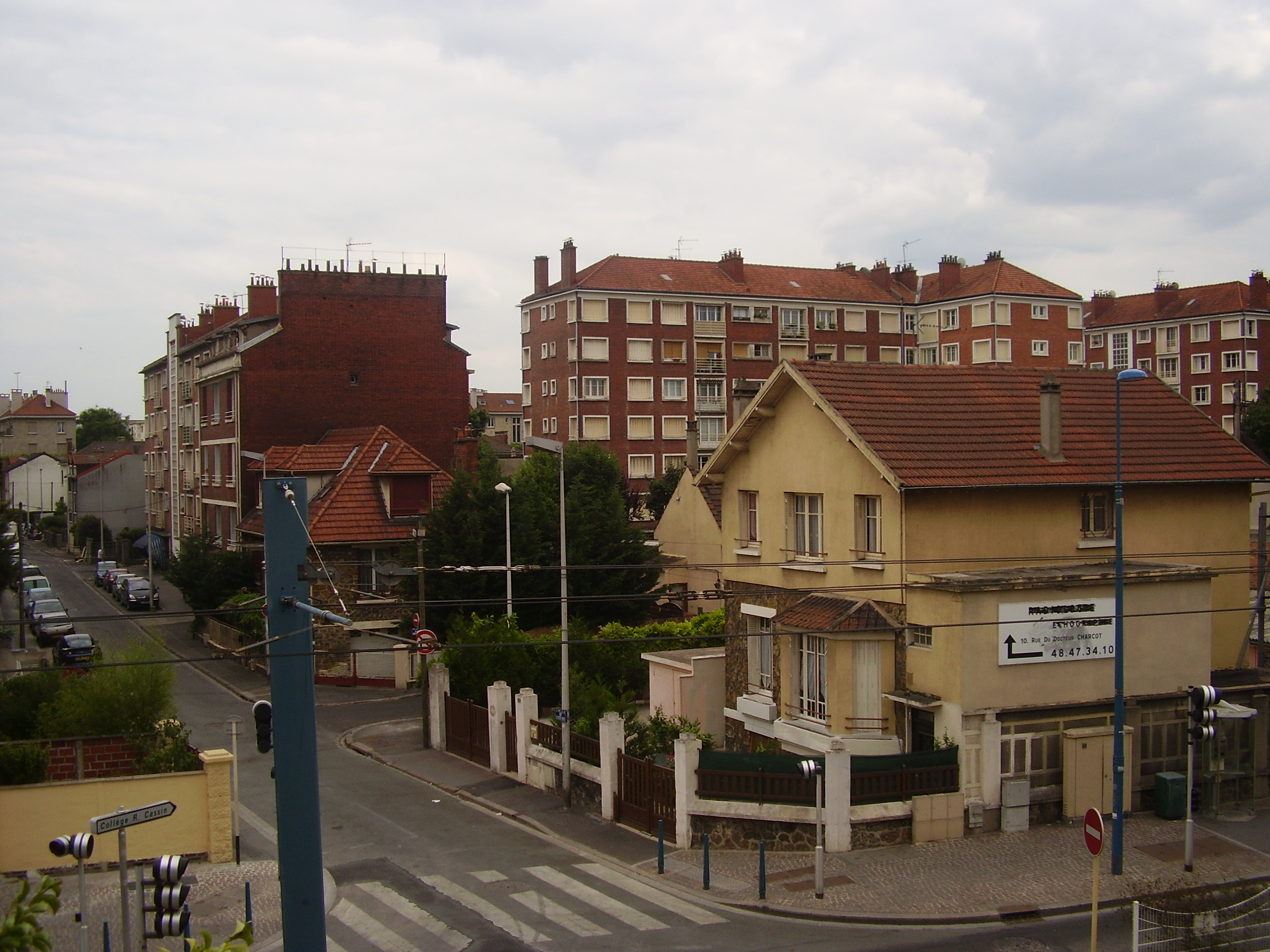
- The district of Petit Noisy

- Coat of arms

- Location (in red) within Paris inner suburbs
- Location of Noisy-le-Sec
- Location within France Location within Île-de-France (region)
- Coordinates: 48°53′22″N 2°27′01″E
- Country: France
- Region: Île-de-France
- Department: Seine-Saint-Denis
- Arrondissement: Bobigny
- Canton: Bobigny
- Intercommunality: Grand Paris

Government
  - Mayor (2026–32): Olivier Sarrabeyrouse
- Area^{1}: 5.04 km^{2} (1.95 sq mi)
- Elevation: 57 m (187 ft)
- Population (2023): 45,510
  - Density: 9,030/km^{2} (23,400/sq mi)
- Time zone: UTC+01:00 (CET)
  - Summer (DST): UTC+02:00 (CEST)
- INSEE/Postal code: 93053 /93130
- ^{1} French Land Register data, which excludes lakes, ponds, glaciers > 1 km^{2} (0.386 sq mi or 247 acres) and river estuaries.

Noisy-le-Sec (French pronunciation: [nwazi lə sɛk]) is a commune in the eastern suburbs of Paris, France. It is located 8.6 km (5.3 mi) from the center of Paris.

== Toponymy ==
The name Noisy derives from the Latin Nucetum meaning 'walnut grove'. Le Sec means 'the dry', and refers to the dry, less fertile soil of the area.

== History ==
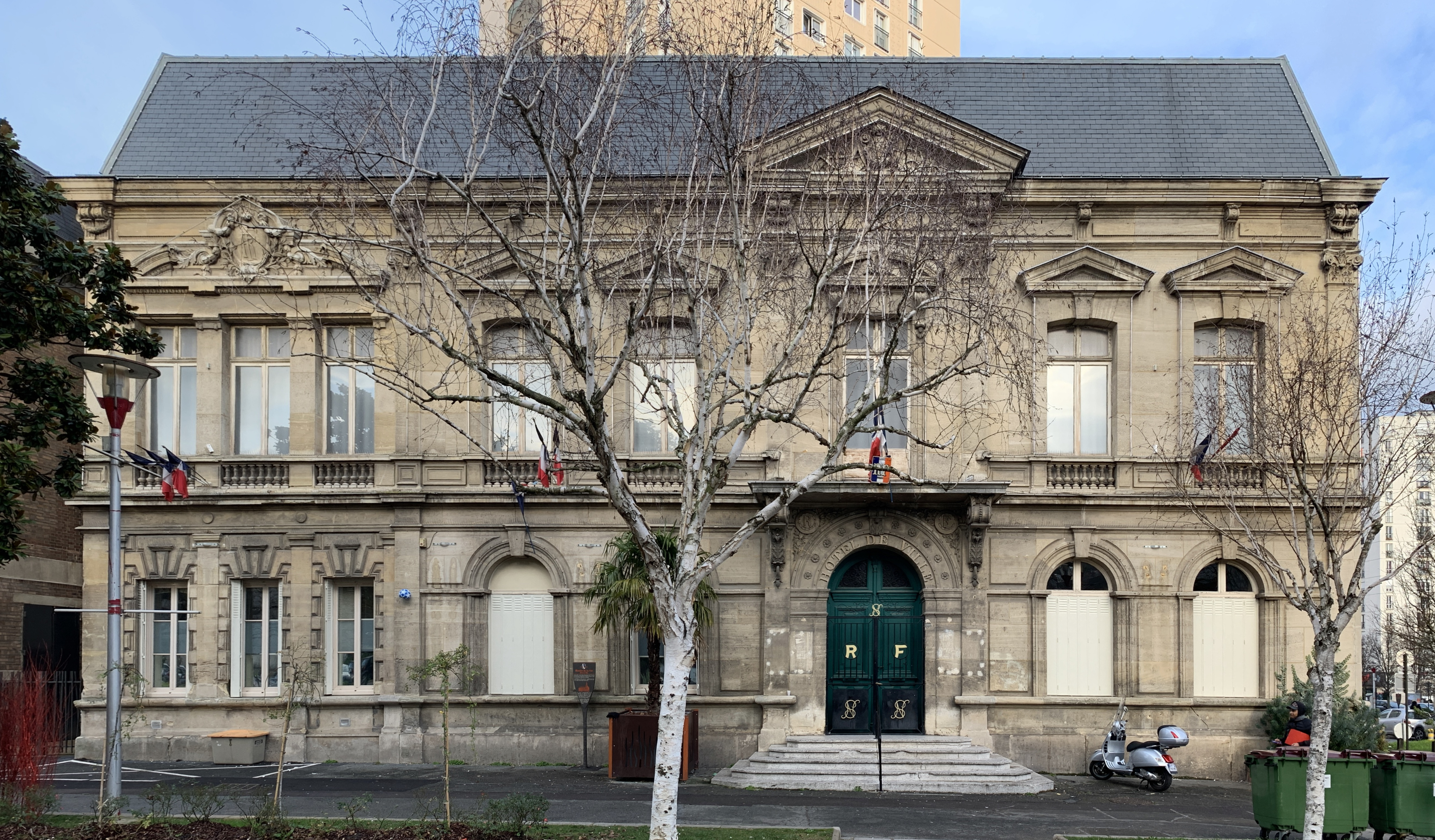
The Hôtel de Ville

The Hôtel de Ville was completed in 1846.

== Population ==
Historical population

| Year | Pop. | ±% p.a. |
|---|---|---|
| 1793 | 1,272 | — |
| 1800 | 1,397 | +1.35% |
| 1806 | 1,455 | +0.68% |
| 1821 | 1,531 | +0.34% |
| 1831 | 1,773 | +1.48% |
| 1836 | 1,876 | +1.14% |
| 1841 | 2,363 | +4.72% |
| 1846 | 1,983 | −3.45% |
| 1851 | 2,010 | +0.27% |
| 1856 | 2,156 | +1.41% |
| 1861 | 2,549 | +3.41% |
| 1866 | 2,976 | +3.15% |
| 1872 | 2,934 | −0.24% |
| 1876 | 3,170 | +1.95% |
| 1881 | 3,897 | +4.22% |
| 1886 | 4,823 | +4.36% |
| 1891 | 5,772 | +3.66% |
| 1896 | 8,105 | +7.03% |
| 1901 | 9,759 | +3.78% |

| Year | Pop. | ±% p.a. |
|---|---|---|
| 1906 | 10,836 | +2.12% |
| 1911 | 13,648 | +4.72% |
| 1921 | 16,306 | +1.80% |
| 1926 | 18,835 | +2.93% |
| 1931 | 22,332 | +3.46% |
| 1936 | 22,359 | +0.02% |
| 1946 | 16,340 | −3.09% |
| 1954 | 22,337 | +3.99% |
| 1962 | 31,187 | +4.26% |
| 1968 | 34,079 | +1.49% |
| 1975 | 37,734 | +1.47% |
| 1982 | 36,880 | −0.33% |
| 1990 | 36,309 | −0.19% |
| 1999 | 37,312 | +0.30% |
| 2007 | 38,802 | +0.49% |
| 2012 | 40,161 | +0.69% |
| 2017 | 44,136 | +1.91% |
| 2023 | 45,510 | +0.51% |

Source: EHESS and INSEE (1968-2023)

== Heraldry ==
| Arms of Noisy-le-Sec | The arms of Noisy-le-Sec are blazoned : Azure, 2 stalks of wheat in saltire between 3 nuts and a bunch of grapes slipped and leaved argent. |

== Transport ==
Noisy-le-Sec is served by Noisy-le-Sec station on Paris RER line E.

== Education ==
Schools:

- 12 preschools
- 9 elementary schools
- One combined preschool and elementary school
- Two junior high schools: Collège Cassin and Collège Prévert
- Collège et lycée Olympe-de-Gouges (combined junior and senior high school)
- Lycée professionnel Théodore-Monod (senior high school)

== Personalities ==
- Jean Delannoy, filmmaker
- Amandine Buchard, judoka
- Hassoun Camara, footballer
- Féfé, rapper and singer, member of the Saian Supa Crew
- Albin Lermusiaux (1874–1940), runner and shooter
- French singer Eddy Mitchell lived in the city after his marriage in 1961
- Hip hop group La Caution
- Siné, cartoonist
- Boubakary Soumare, footballer
- Thomas Jordier, sprinter
- Lou Deleuze, singer, winner of Junior Eurovision Song Contest 2025

== See also ==
- Communes of the Seine-Saint-Denis department
