= J. M. Barnsley =

Canadian painter (1861–1929)

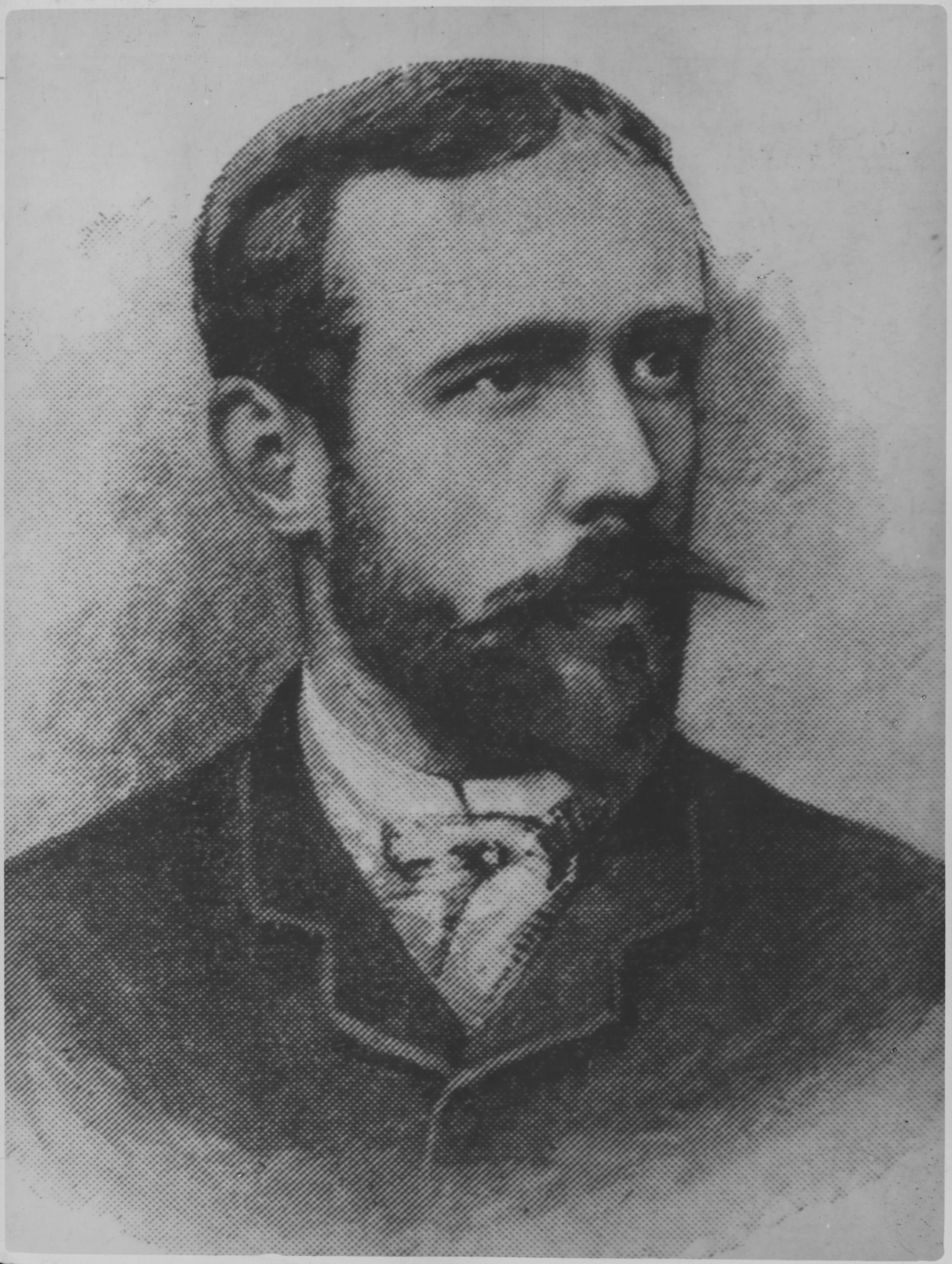
- Born: James Macdonald Barnsley; February 20, 1861; West Flamborough, Canada West
- Died: February 25, 1929 (aged 68)
- Education: St. Louis School of Fine Arts
- Occupation: Painter

James Macdonald Barnsley (February 20, 1861 – February 25, 1929) was a Canadian painter of maritime art. His watercolours and some of his oils reflect the influence of the Hague School which, starting in the 1870s, created moody landscapes in almost monochromatic hues.

== Biography ==
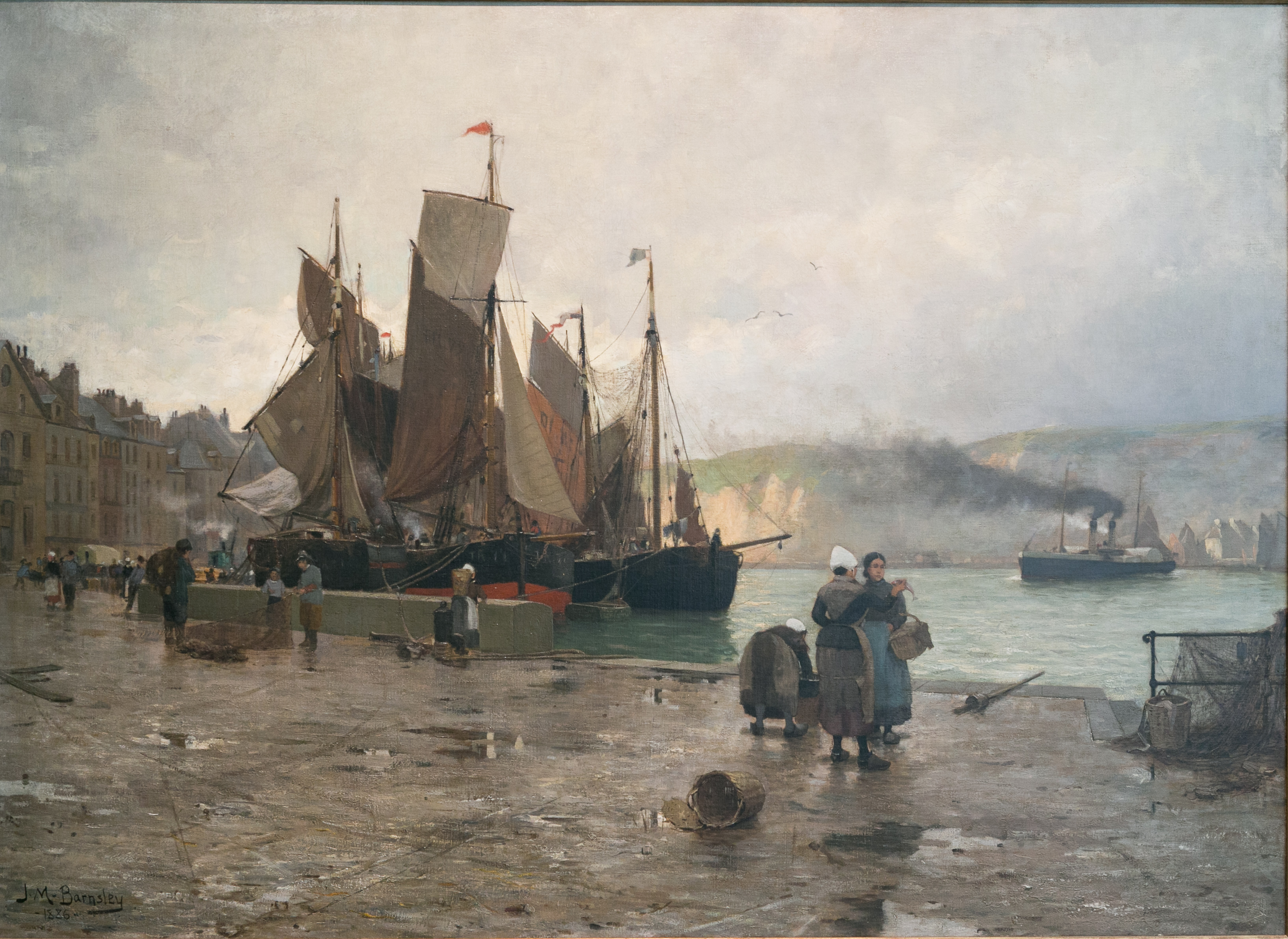
High Tide at Dieppe, 1886

Barnsley was born in West Flamborough, Canada West, today known as Dundas, Ontario. His childhood was marked by several tragedies: the death of his father and sister, the death of his uncle (his mother's brother), and the burning of the family business. As a result, his mother, Christina Barnsley (1829–1923), moved with him to St. Louis, Missouri, where another brother lived. When he was 18, he began his formal art training at the St. Louis School of Fine Arts. Upon graduated, he was awarded the gold medal.

In 1883, he traveled to Paris, France, and studied with Luigi Loir, Otto de Thoren and Félix de Vuillefroy. He lived in Paris with a studio at Puteaux for five years, and during that time he made the primary subject of his paintings the sea and its ships. In 1883 a comprehensive exhibition of Eugene-Louis Boudin and his French Impressionism seems to have influenced him.

Barnsley exhibited in five Paris salons, received favorable reviews, was elected a member of the Société des amis des arts de Seine-et-Oise (Note: Publications by Société des amis des arts de Seine-et-Oise and other names for it in the Bibliothèque nationale de France (BnF) data base.) at Versailles and won numerous Salon Awards for his maritime and landscape paintings. In 1886, he began to show his work with the Royal Canadian Academy. In 1887, he began exhibiting with W. Scott and Sons Galleries, Montreal.

In 1887, he returned to Canada and showed his work with the Royal Canadian Academy of Arts and began to show work with the Art Association of Montreal. He settled in Montreal and opened a studio in New York as well as travelling abroad. In 1890, he was elected to the New York Watercolour Club at its inaugural meeting.

In 1892, he was diagnosed as mentally ill with schizophrenia and was admitted to the Protestant Hospital for the Insane in Verdun, Montreal where he remained the rest of his life. He never painted again, but his Montreal dealer, W. Scott and Sons Galleries along with his mother, promoted his work and placed it to advantage in exhibitions such as those of the Royal Canadian Academy of Arts and sold it to institutions such as the National Gallery of Canada and Montreal Museum of Fine Arts, where it remains today.

In 1964, the Vancouver Art Gallery circulated a retrospective of 65 of his works to five galleries with a catalogue by J. Barry Lord which remains the best account of his life. Lord also wrote an article in the National Gallery of Canada Bulletin about his discovery of Barnsley sketches in the collection.
