= Jouarre =

- Commune
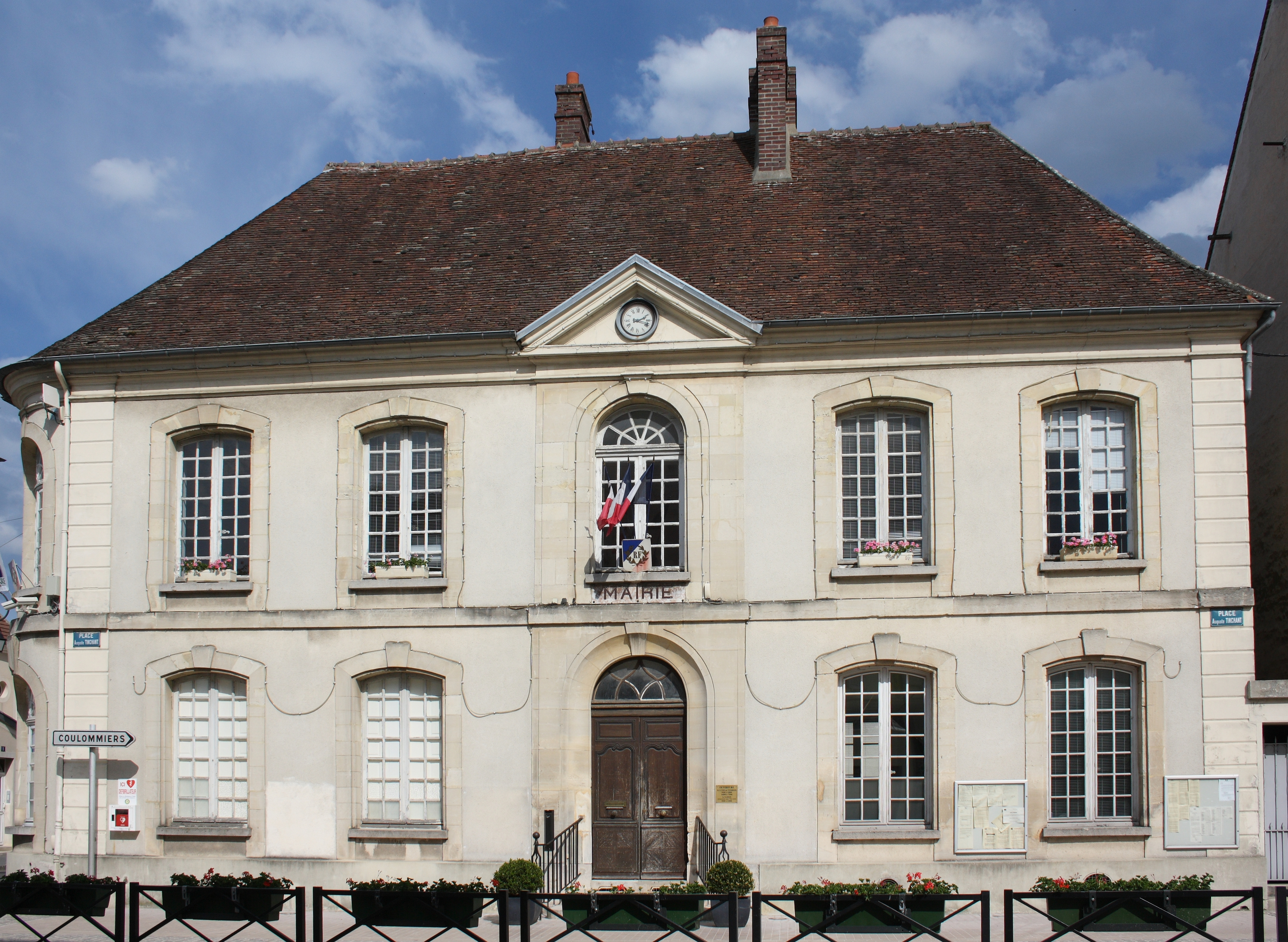
- The town hall in Jouarre

- Coat of arms
- Location of Jouarre
- Location within France Location within Île-de-France (region)
- Coordinates: 48°55′38″N 3°07′51″E
- Country: France
- Region: Île-de-France
- Department: Seine-et-Marne
- Arrondissement: Meaux
- Canton: La Ferté-sous-Jouarre
- Intercommunality: CA Coulommiers Pays de Brie

Government
  - Mayor (2020–2026): Fabien Vallée
- Area^{1}: 42.19 km^{2} (16.29 sq mi)
- Highest elevation: 183 m (600 ft)
- Lowest elevation: 51 m (167 ft)
- Population (2023): 4,221
  - Density: 100.0/km^{2} (259.1/sq mi)
- Time zone: UTC+01:00 (CET)
  - Summer (DST): UTC+02:00 (CEST)
- INSEE/Postal code: 77238 /77640
- ^{1} French Land Register data, which excludes lakes, ponds, glaciers > 1 km^{2} (0.386 sq mi or 247 acres) and river estuaries.

Jouarre (French: [ʒwaʁ]) is a commune in the Seine-et-Marne department in the Île-de-France region in north-central France.

== Jouarre Abbey ==
It is the site of the Jouarre Abbey, a Merovingian foundation of Abbess Theodochilde or Telchilde, traditionally in 630, inspired by the visit of Columban, the travelling Irish monk who inspired monastic institution-building in the early seventh century. At Jouarre, there was a community of monks as well as nuns, but all were under the rule of the abbess, who in 1225 was granted immunity from interference by the bishop of Meaux, answering only to the Pope.

The Merovingian (pre-Romanesque) crypt beneath the Romanesque abbey church contains a number of burials in sarcophagi, notably that of Theodochilde's brother, Agilbert (died 680), carved with a tableau of the Last Judgment and Christ in Majesty, highlights of pre-Romanesque sculpture. In the mid-ninth century the abbey acquired relics of St. Potentien; the relics assembled at Jouarre attracted pilgrims. The reputation of the house stood so high the abbey received a visit from Pope Innocent II in 1131 and was able to house a synod in 1133. The abbess's submission to the bishop of Meaux did not come about until Bossuet held the post in 1690.

The present convent buildings, once again occupied by Benedictine nuns, date from the eighteenth century; their traditional vegetable and fruit garden (potager) are notable.

== Population ==
Historical population
| Year | Pop. | ±% p.a. |
|---|---|---|
| 1968 | 2,536 | — |
| 1975 | 2,765 | +1.24% |
| 1982 | 2,700 | −0.34% |
| 1990 | 3,274 | +2.44% |
| 1999 | 3,415 | +0.47% |
| 2007 | 4,085 | +2.26% |
| 2012 | 4,180 | +0.46% |
| 2017 | 4,337 | +0.74% |
| 2023 | 4,221 | −0.45% |
Source: INSEE

Inhabitants are called Jotranciens in French.

== See also ==
- Communes of the Seine-et-Marne department
