= Louis-Marie Désiré-Lucas =

French painter

Louis-Marie Désiré-Lucas (15 October 1869, Fort-de-France, Martinique – 29 September 1949, Douarnenez) was a French painter.
