= Joseph de La Nézière =

French painter

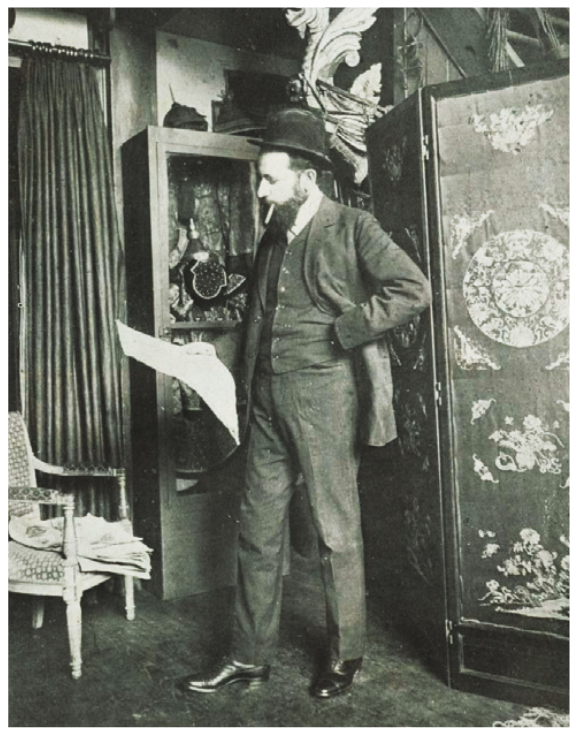
- Portrait of Joseph de La Nézière, 1910
- Born: 5 August 1873; Bourges, France
- Died: 15 April 1944 (aged 70); Casablanca, Morocco
- Education: Beaux-Arts Academy
- Known for: Painter and illustrator
- Movement: Orientalist

Joseph de La Nézière (1873–1944) was a French painter noted for painting Orientalist scenes and for his work with the French Colonial Office and its program to reform the arts industries in colonial France.

== Biography ==
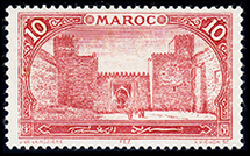
La Nézière designed 1917 stamp of Morocco

Joseph de La Nézière was born in Bourges, France in 1873 and was born into a talented family. His brother, Raymond de La Nézière (1865–1953) became an illustrator. His younger brother, Georges de la Nézière was killed in action in the first World War. As a child, Joseph was a very good student and learned piano, violin and Latin-Greek. He studied painting with artist, Alfred Roll, a member of the Beaux-Arts Academy.

La Nézière traveled extensively in North Africa and the Far East and became a well-known Orientalist artist. He was a member of the Geographic Society.

He held various administrative roles with the French Colonial office which had embarked on a sophisticated program to reform the arts industries in colonial France. La Nézière employed many Orientalist painters to assist him and also employed both men and women in equal numbers. In around 1919, he headed a project based in Rabat, Morocco to produce some 300 Oriental rugs under the auspices of the Office des Industries d'Artes Indigenes. Destined for sale on the French market, these rugs were sold immediately and were enormously popular. They became known as the "Middle Atlas" rug.

He was a member French Society of Orientalist Painters and regularly exhibited at their Paris exhibitions.

As the official painter for the French Colonial Office, he was commissioned in 1910 to illustrate the stamps for the postal service of French North African colonies. He also created a series of famous posters for the Paris Colonial Exposition of 1931.

In 1943, he returned to France with his student, Henri Marie-Rose, but before long he once again travelled to Morocco where he died on April 15, 1944, in Casablanca, Morocco.

== Work ==
He worked as a portrait painter, landscape painter, poster artist, travel journalist, and diorama painter, and made postage stamps for France, the Middle East and Africa. He illustrated the book Siamese Life Scenes by Louis P. Rivière. He also authored a number of books which were richly illustrated with his artwork. His principal medium was watercolour.

Selected artwork

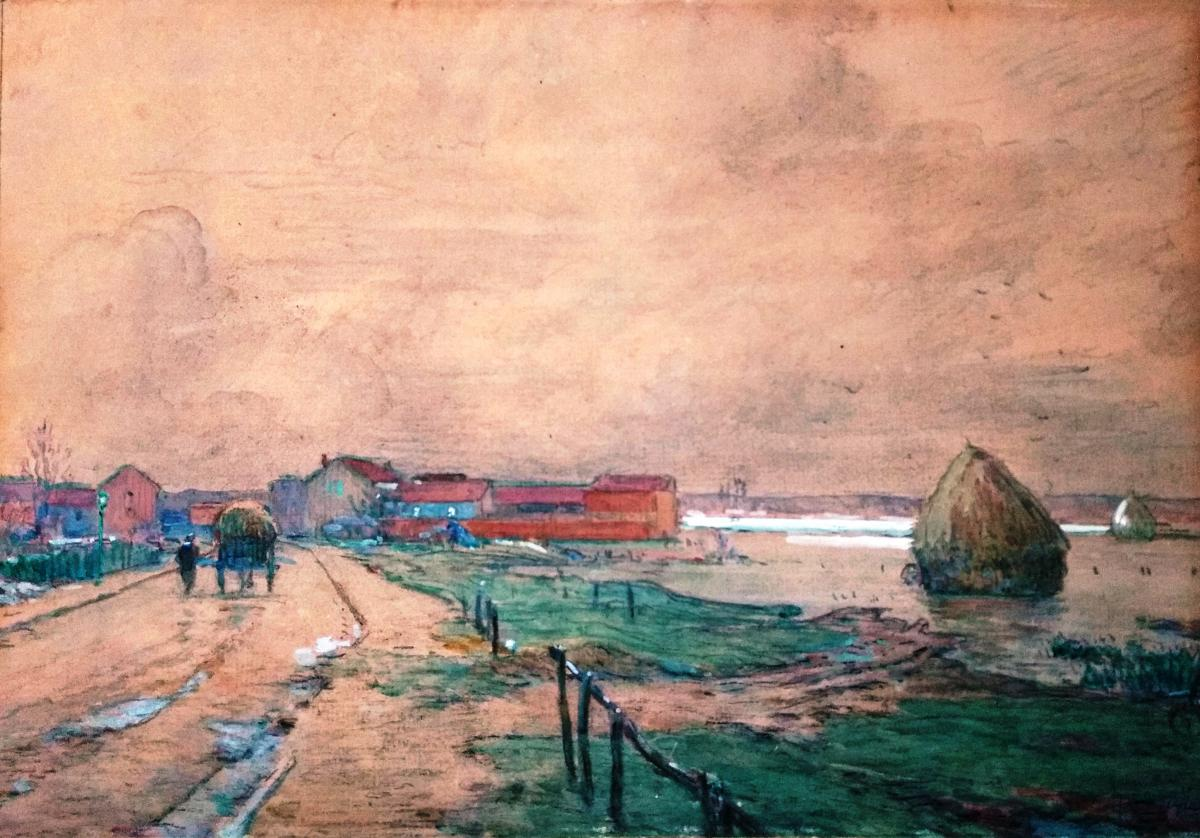
Vue de Gennevilliers, 1910

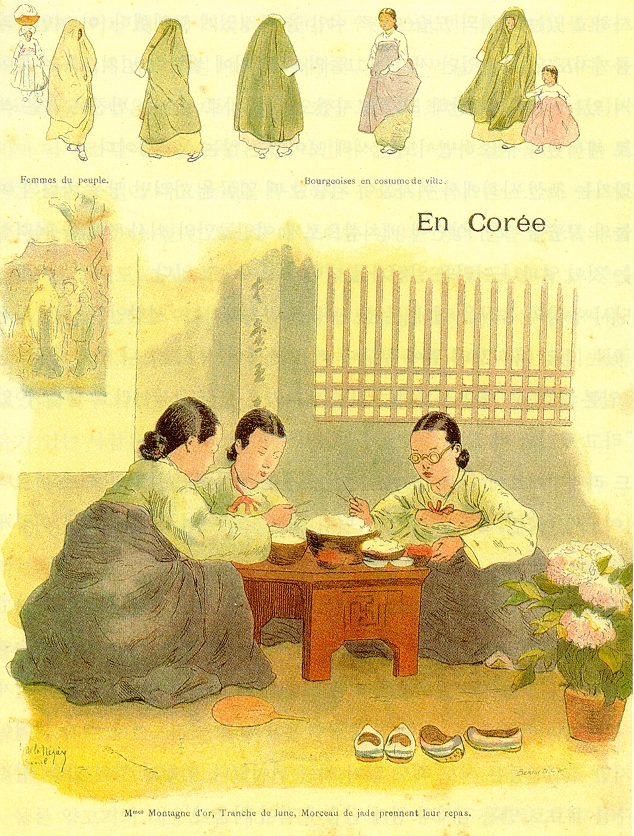
Korea, Far East (lithograph), 1903

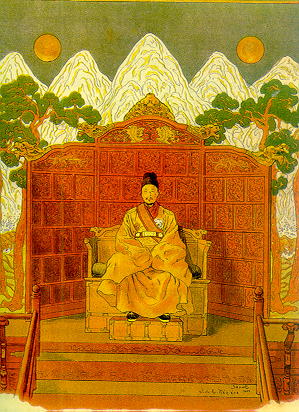
Gojong, King of the Korean Empire, 1903

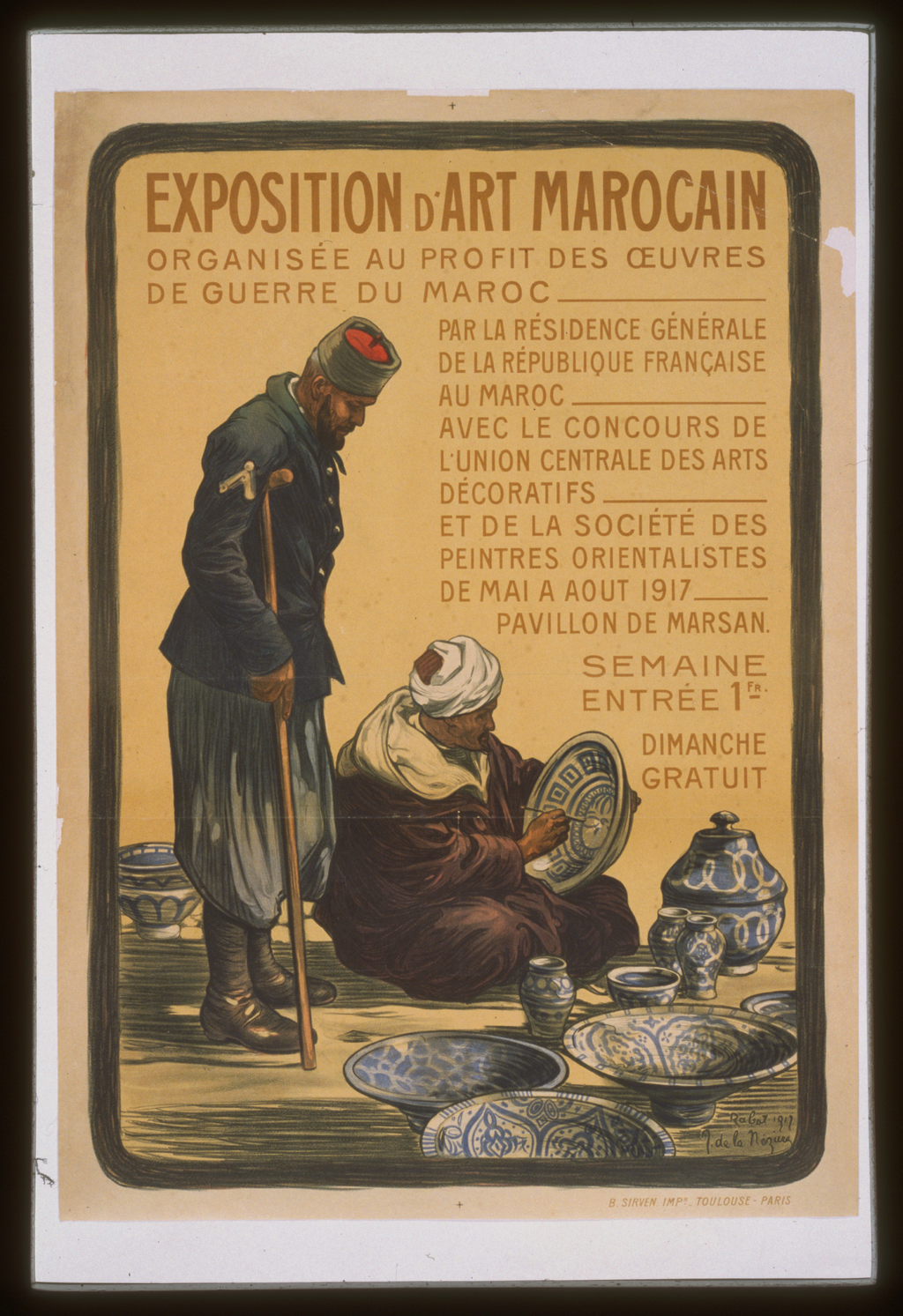
Exposition of Moroccan Art, (poster), 1917

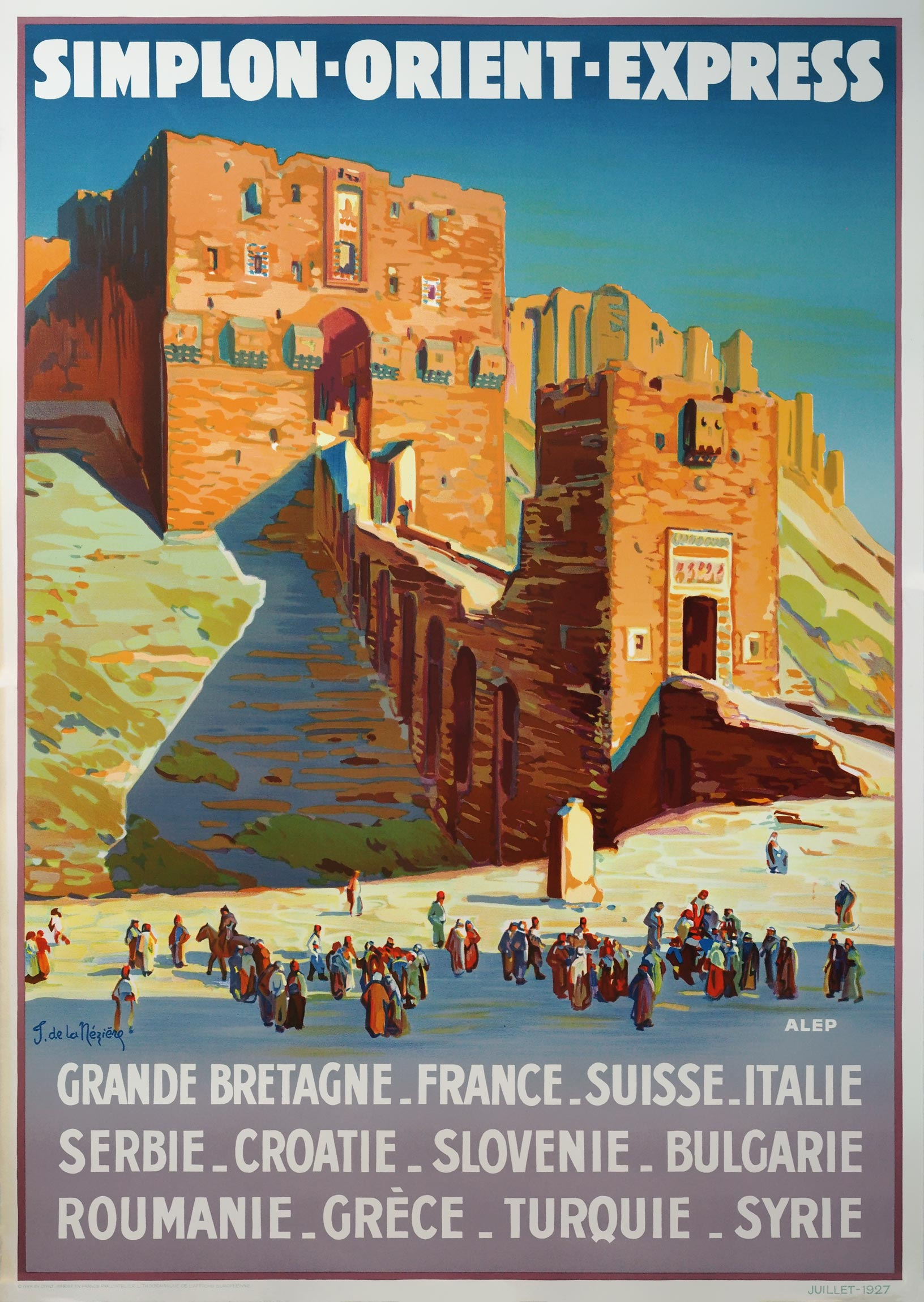
Simplon-Orient-Express poster

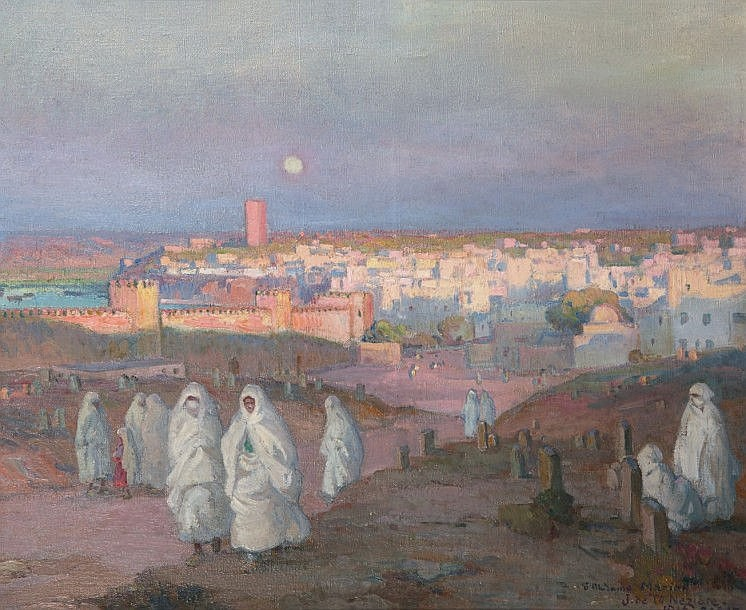
Women in white on their way to Rabat, 1916

Books

- L'Extrême-Orient en images: Sibérie, Chine, Corée, Japon Paris, 1904
- Les Monuments Mauresques du Maroc, Volume 1, A. Lévy, 1922
- La Décoration Marocaine A. Calavas, 1924

== See also ==
- List of Orientalist artists
- Orientalism

== Sources ==
- Akoun 2004, la Cote de l'Amateur publishing, p. 470
- The Globe Trotter, 1912. "New Stamps for the French Colonies", p. 92
- the French Post Museum website, France
