= List of people from Greece =

This is a list of notable Greeks.

== Actors/actresses ==
=== Ancient period ===
- Metrobius
- Thespis

== Adventurers ==
- Constantine Phaulkon (1648–1688), first counsellor of King Narai of Siam
- Lefteri (?–1872), bandit

== Athletes and sports figures ==
=== Ancient period ===
- Alexander I of Macedon, runner and Olympic winner
- Astylos of Croton
- Pheidippides

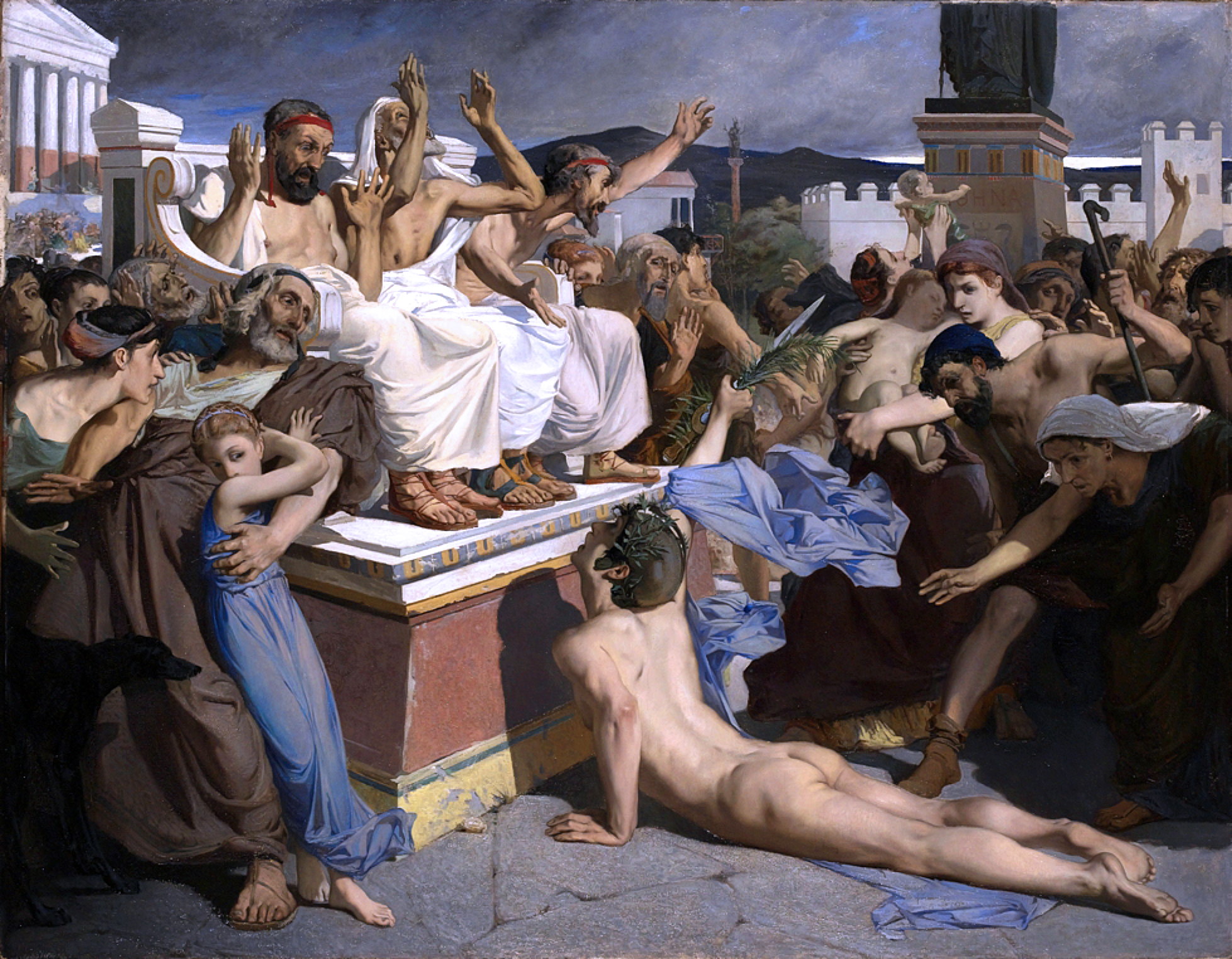
Phidippides, acclaimed runner and 'inspirator' of the Olympic Marathon race, who had run back and forth between Athens and Sparta in order to relay news of the Battle of Marathon, resulting in his death from ultimate exhaustion, when in his last breath he yelled out "We (the Greeks) won". Painting by Luc-Olivier Merson, 1869.

- Chionis of Sparta
- Cynisca
- Diagoras of Rhodes, boxer
- Dioxippus, pankration
- Hydna, swimmer and diver
- Kleitomachos, pankration
- Leonidas of Rhodes, ancient runner and Olympic winner
- Milo of Croton, pankration
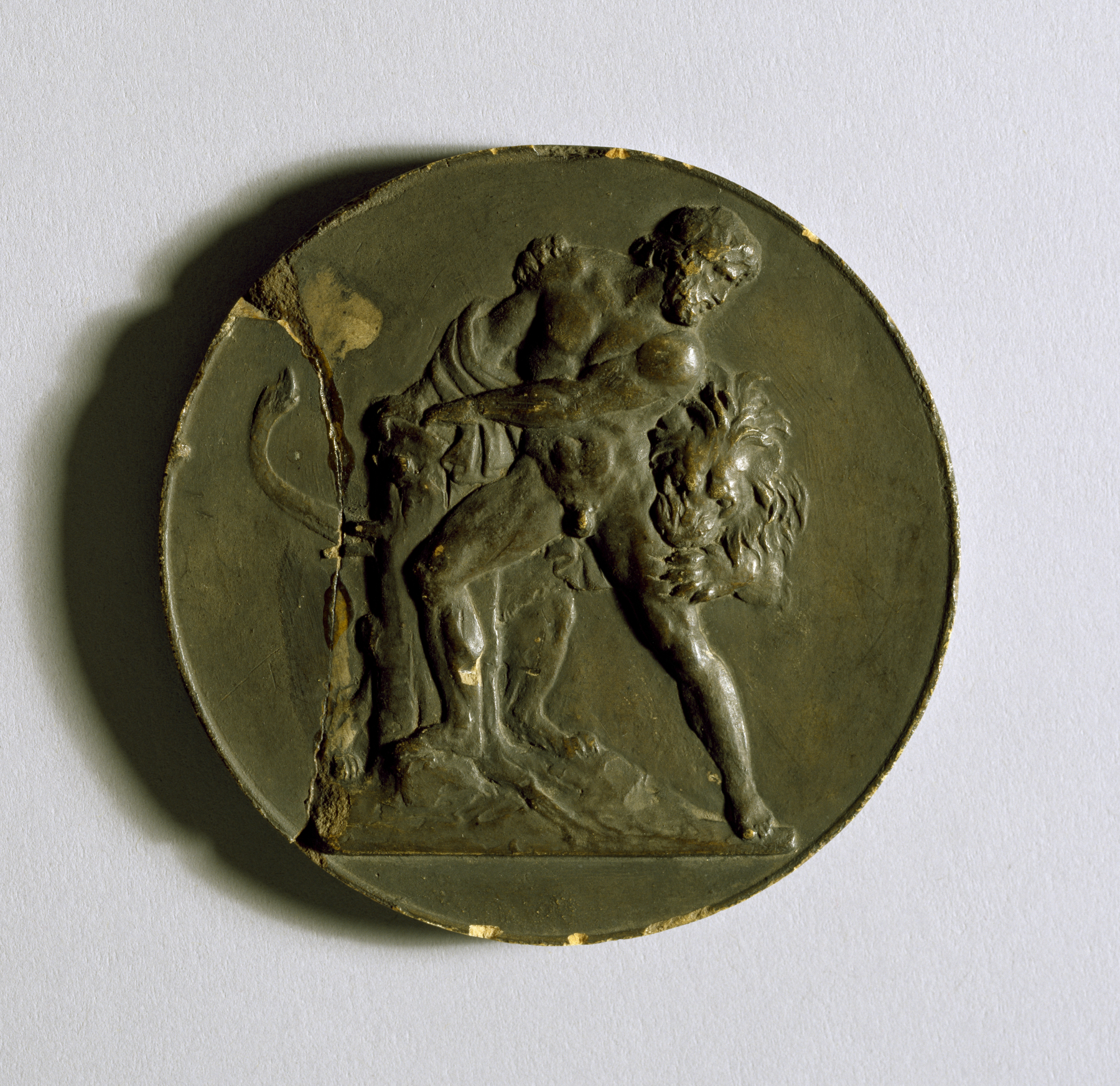
  Milo of Croton, wrestler and the most acclaimed ancient Olympian
- Troilus of Elis
- Phillip of Macedon

=== Modern period ===
- Emmanouil Karalis, pole vaulter
- Aristidis Akratopoulos, tennis player
- Konstantinos Akratopoulos, tennis player
- Giannis Antetokounmpo, basketball player
- Nikos Alefantos, football player and manager
- Anna Korakaki, sport shooter and Olympic champion
- Anastasios Bakasetas, football player
- Andreas Bouchalakis, football player
- Lampros Choutos, football player
- Fanis Christodoulou, basketball player
- Giannis Christofilopoulos, football player
- Anton Christoforidis, boxer
- Stephanos Christopoulos, wrestler
- Constantine II, former King of Greece, 1960 Olympic champion in sailing (Dragon class)
- Ioannis Chrysafis, gymnast
- Nikos Dabizas, football player
- Evangelos Damaskos, pole vaulter
- Nick "the Greek" Dandolos, gambler
- Eleni Daniilidou, tennis player
- Filipos Darlas, football player
- Stefanos Dedas (born 1982), basketball head coach in the Israel Basketball Premier League
- Dimitrios Deligiannis, marathoner
- Traianos Dellas, football player
- Hrysopiyí Devetzí, triple jumper and long jumper
- Themistoklis Diakidis, high jumper
- Dimitris Diamantidis, basketball player
- Georgios Diamantis, shooter
- Dimosthenis Dikoudis, basketball player
- Stefanos Dimitrios, middle-distance runner
- Zoi Dimoschaki, swimmer
- Mimis Domazos, football player
- Georgios Donis, football player
- Dimitrios Drivas, swimmer
- Kostas Eleftherakis, football player
- Dimitrios Eleftheropoulos, football player
- Giannoulis Fakinos, football player
- Panagiotis Fasoulas, basketball player
- Giannis Fetfatzidis, football player
- Alexios Fetsios, shooter
- Angelos Fetsis, middle-distance runner
- Giorgos Foiros, football player and manager
- Antonis Fotsis, basketball player
- D. Frangopoulos, tennis player
- Takis Fyssas, football player
- Nikos Galis, basketball player, MVP of Eurobasket 1987
- Konstadinos Gatsioudis, javelin thrower
- Theofanis Gekas, football player
- Georgios Gennimatas, sprinter
- Nikolaos Georgantas, discus thrower
- Grigorios Georgatos, football player
- Giorgios Georgiadis, football player
- Ioannis Georgiadis, fencer
- Evangelos Gerakeris, marathoner
- Panagiotis Giannakis, basketball player, captain of Greek Eurobasket 1987 champion team

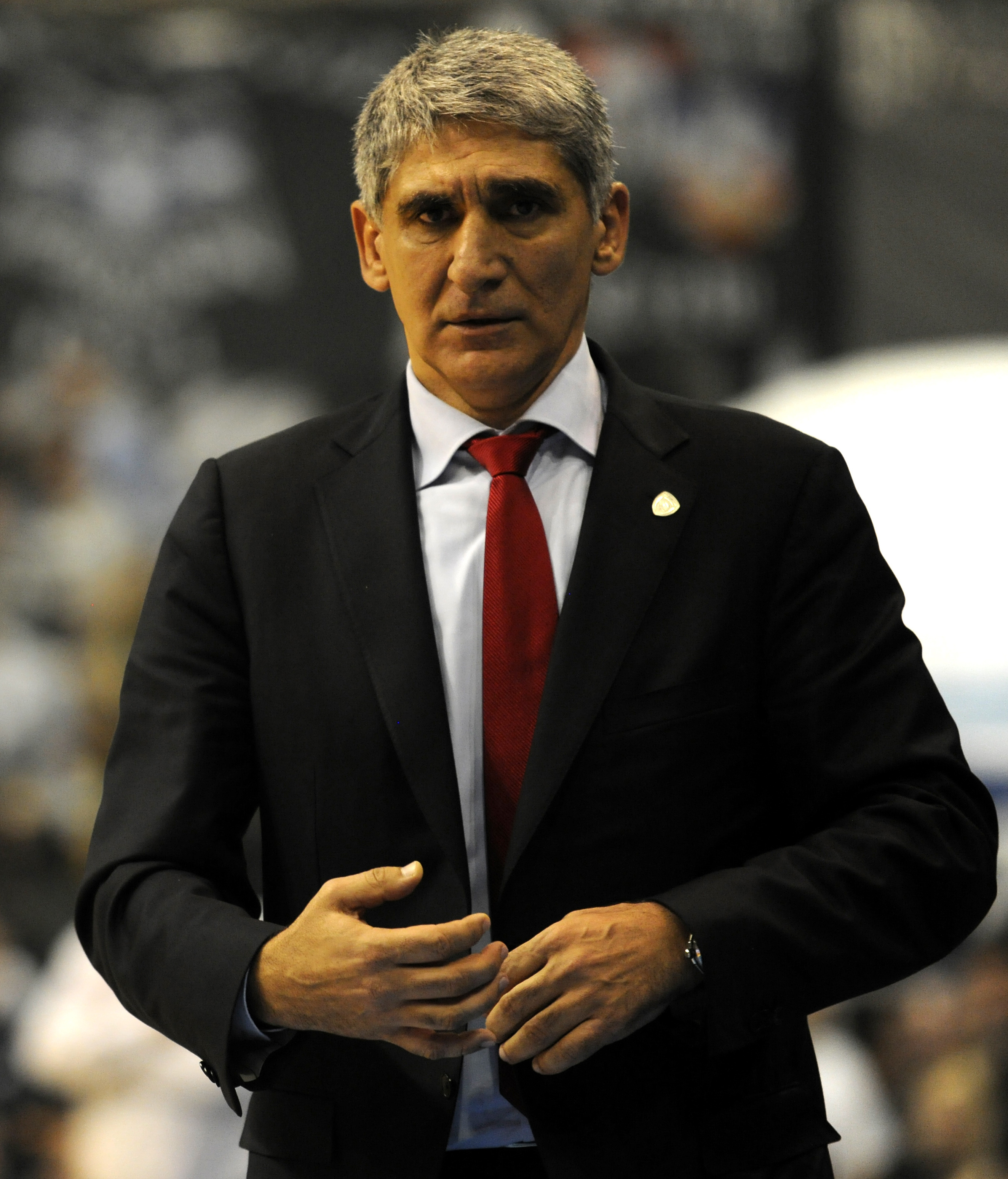
Panagiotis Giannakis, former 1987 EuroBasket team captain and former Olympiacos head coach

- Stelios Giannakopoulos, football player
- Kleopas Giannou, football player
- Herodotos Giorgallas, gymnast
- Giannis Gitsioudis, football player
- Andreas Glyniadakis, basketball player
- Spyros Gogolos, football player
- Dimitrios Golemis, middle-distance runner
- Georgios Gougoulias, football player
- Yannis Goumas, football player
- Anastasios Gousis, sprinter
- Miltiadis Gouskos, shot putter
- Georgios Grigoriou, marathoner
- Efstratios Grivas, chess player
- Faní Halkiá, Olympic champion hurdler
- Vassilis Hatzipanagis, football player
- José Holebas, football player
- Periklis Iakovakis, hurdler
- Georgios Iatridis, fencer
- Miltiades Iatrou, cyclist
- Takis Ikonomopoulos, football player
- Giannis Ioannidis, basketball player and coach
- Leonidas Kabantais, football player
- Pantelis Kafes, football player
- Ilias Kafetzis, marathoner
- Kakhi Kakhiashvili, weightlifter
- Michalis Kakiouzis, basketball player
- Nikos Kaklamanakis, windsurfer
- Stamatis Kalamiotis, football player
- Ioannis Kalitzakis, football player
- Georgios Kalogiannidis, archer
- George Kalovelonis, tennis player
- Marios Kaperonis, boxer
- Michalis Kapsis, football player
- Alexandros Karageorgiou, archer
- Giorgos Karagounis, football player
- Telemachos Karakalos, fencer
- Karakatsanis, shooter
- Konstantinos Karakatsanis, middle-distance runner
- Pantelis Karasevdas, shooter
- Hristos Karipidis, football player
- George Karlaftis, American football player
- Filippos Karvelas, gymnast
- Michalis Kasapis, football player
- Dionysios Kasdaglis, tennis player
- Fanis Katergiannakis, football player
- N. Kartavas, swimmer
- Kostas Katsouranis, football player
- Ioannis Kastritis, former basketball player and coach in the Israel Basketball Premier League
- Anastasía Kelesídou, discus thrower
- Konstantinos Kenteris, European, World and Olympic champion sprinter
- Alexandros Khalkokondilis, sprinter and long jumper
- Hatzidakis, shooter
- Dimitrios Christopoulos, marathoner
- Vassilis Kikilias, basketball player
- Michalis Klokidis, football player
- Frank Klopas, football player
- Ekaterini Koffa, sprinter
- Savvas Kofidis, football player
- Dimitrios Kokotis, high jumper
- Dinos Konstantakis, football player
- Georgios Kolettis, cyclist
- Georgios Koltsidas, football player
- Giorgos Koltzos, football player
- Konstantinos Komninos-Miliotis, fencer
- Aristidis Konstantinidis, cyclist
- Vasilis Konstantinou, football player
- Konstantinos Konstantinou, cyclist
- Michalis Konstantinou, football player
- Dimitrios Konstantopoulos, football player
- Georgios Korakakis, football player
- Prodromos Korkizoglou, decathlete
- Anastasia Kostaki, basketball player
- Nikos Kostakis, football player
- Yiorgos Kostikos, football player
- Athanasios Kostoulas, football player
- Vasilios Kotronias, chess player
- Ilias Kotsios, football player
- Stefanos Kotsolis, football player
- Giorgos Koudas, football player
- Dinos Kouis, football player
- Konstantinos Koukodimos, long jumper
- Efthimios Kouloucheris, football player
- Yiannis Kouros, multiple world record-holding ultramarathoner
- Vasilios Koutsianikoulis, football player
- Vaggelis Koutsoures, football player
- Petros Kravaritis, football player
- Ioannis Kyrastas, football player
- Sotirios Kyrgiakos, football player
- Anastasios Kyriakos, football player
- Panagiotis Lagos, football player
- Vasilios Lakis, football player
- Leonidas Langakis, shooter
- Ioannis Lavrentis, marathoner
- Sotiris Leontiou, football player
- Nikolaos Levidis, shooter
- Kostas Linoxilakis, football player
- Spiros Livathinos, football player and manager
- Spiridon Louis, marathoner, winner of first modern Olympic marathon
- Takis Loukanidis, football player
- Konstantinos Loumpoutis, football player
- Dimitrios Loundras, gymnast
- Nikolaos Lyberopoulos, football player
- Nikos Machlas, football player
- Ioannis Malokinis, swimmer
- Miréla Manjani, javelin thrower
- Stelios Manolas, football player
- Vlasios Maras, gymnast
- Nick Markakis baseball, player
- Dimitris Markos, football player
- Stamatios Masouris, marathoner
- Dimitris Mavrogenidis, football player
- Loukas Mavrokefalidis, basketball player
- Thomas Mavros, football player
- Hristos Meletoglou, triple jumper
- Angelos Messaris, football player
- Anastasios Metaxas, shooter
- Athanasios Michalopoulos, volleyball player
- Nikolaos Michopoulos, football player
- Zenon Mikhailidis, shooter
- Kostas Mitroglou, football player
- Ioannis Mitropoulos, gymnast
- Tasos Mitropoulos, football player
- Georgios Mitsibonas, football player
- Antonis Miyiakis, football player
- Vaggelis Moras, football player
- Nikolaos Morakis, shooter
- Irini Mouchou, triathlete
- Andreas Mouratis, football player
- Moustakopoulos, shooter
- Apostolos Nanos, archer
- Evangelos Nastos, football player
- Konstantinos Nebegleras, football player
- Kostas Negrepontis, football player
- Kostas Nestoridis, football player
- Apostolos Nikolaidis, football and volleyball player
- Demis Nikolaidis, football player
- Alexandros Nikolopoulos, weightlifter
- Stamatios Nikolopoulos, cyclist
- Antonios Nikopolidis, football player
- Sotiris Ninis, football player
- Nikos Nioplias, football player
- Georgios Orphanidis, shooter
- Alexandros Pagalis, football player
- Alketas Panagoulias, football player and manager
- Loukas Panourgias, football player
- Pantazidis, shooter
- Anastasios Pantos, football player
- Alexandros Papadimitriou, hammer thrower
- Avraam Papadopoulos, football player
- Dimitrios Papadopoulos, football player
- Lazaros Papadopoulos, basketball player
- Antonios Papaioannou, gymnast
- Mimis Papaioannou, football player
- Lambros Papakostas, high jumper
- Theodoros Papaloukas, basketball player
- Manolis Papamakarios, basketball player
- Christos Papanikolaou, pole vaulter
- Georgios Papasideris, weightlifter
- Eleftherios Papasymeon, marathoner
- Athina Papayianni, race walker
- Charilaos Pappas, football player
- Georgios Paraskevopoulos, cyclist
- Panagiotis Paraskevopoulos, discus thrower
- Mikhail Paskalides, sprinter
- Konstantinos Paspatis, tennis player
- Petros Passalis, football player
- George Patis, badminton player
- Voula Patoulidou, hurdler
- Christos Patsatzoglou, football player
- Patsouris, shooter
- Pavlos Pavlidis, shooter
- Antonios Pepanos, swimmer
- Ioannis Persakis, triple jumper
- Petros Persakis, gymnast
- Aristovoulos Petmezas, gymnast and shooter
- Demetrios Petrokokkinos, tennis player
- Ioannis Phrangoudis, shooter
- Mimis Pierrakos, football player
- Periklis Pierrakos-Mavromichalis, fencer
- Stiliani Pilatou, long jumper
- Platis, shooter
- Hristos Polihroniou, hammer thrower
- Ioannis Poulos, fencer
- Evangelia Psarra, archer
- Leonidas Pyrgos, fencer

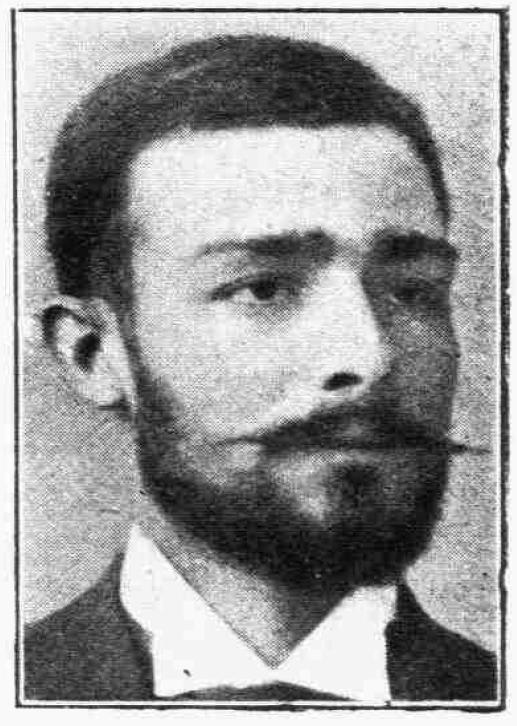
Leonidas Pyrgos, first modern Olympic gold medalist in fencing

- Evangelos Rallis, tennis player
- Kurt Rambis (Kyriakos Rambidis), basketball player, won four NBA championships with the Los Angeles Lakers
- Flora Redoumi, hurdler
- Dimitrios Regas, sprinter
- Efthimios Rentzias, basketball player
- Elpida Romantzi, archer
- Nicolas Rossolimo, chess player
- Georgios Roubanis, pole vaulter
- Sakis Rouvas, pole vaulter (later became famous as a musician-entertainer)
- Maria Sakkari, tennis player
- Dimitris Salpingidis, football player
- Georgios Samaras, football player
- Sanidis, shooter
- Miltiadis Sapanis, football player
- Dimitris Saravakos, football player
- Nikos Sarganis, football player
- Georgios Saridakis, race walker
- Sofoklis Schortsanitis, basketball player

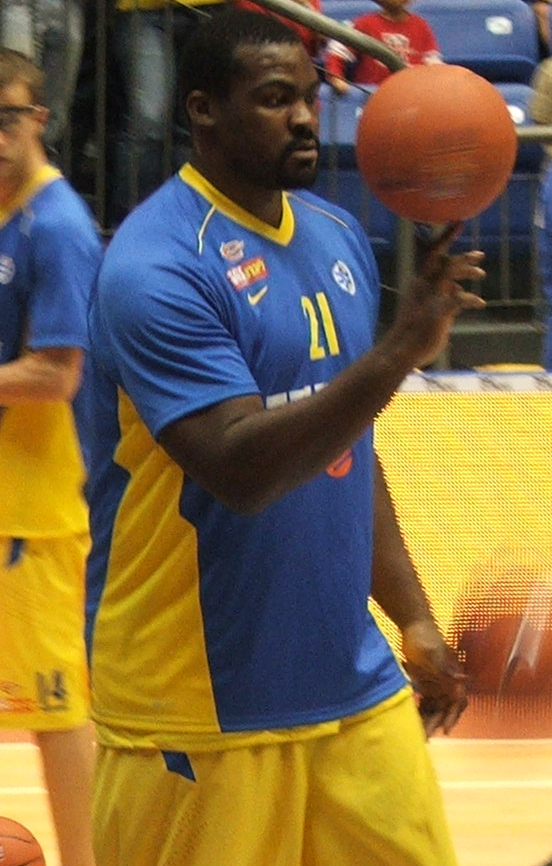
Sofoklis Schortsanitis

- Yourkas Seitaridis, football player
- Ioannis Sfairopoulos (born 1967), basketball coach in the Israeli Basketball Premier League and EuroLeague
- Giorgos Sideris, football player
- Nikolaos Siranidis, diver
- Athanasios Skaltsogiannis
- Giannis Skopelitis, football player
- Georgios Skoutarides, sprinter and hurdler
- Vasileios Spanoulis, basketball player
- Konstantinos Spetsiotis, race walker
- Spiridon Stais, shooter
- Andreas Stamatiadis, football player
- Ieroklis Stoltidis, football player
- Aryiro Strataki, heptathlete
- Dimosthenis Tampakos, gymnast
- Giannis Taralidis, football player
- Alexandros Tatsis, football player
- Efstathios Tavlaridis, football player
- Miltos Tentoglou, long jumper
- Irini Terzoglou, shot putter
- Ekateríni Thánou, sprinter
- Stefanos Theodoridis, football player
- Georgios Theodoridis, sprinter
- Ioannis Theodoropoulos, pole vaulter
- Alexandros Theofilakis, shooter
- Ioannis Theofilakis, shooter
- Dimitrios Tomprof, middle-distance runner
- Vasilis Torosidis, football player
- Nicolaos Trikupis, shooter
- A. Tryfiatis-Tripiaris, cyclist
- Jake Tsakalidis, basketball player
- Kostas Tsartsaris, basketball player
- Loúis Tsátoumas, long jumper
- Dimitrios Tsiamis, triple jumper
- Paraskeví Tsiamíta, triple jumper
- Nikos Tsiantakis, football player
- Vasilios Tsiartas, football player
- Konstantinos Tsiklitiras, Olympic champion standing long jumper
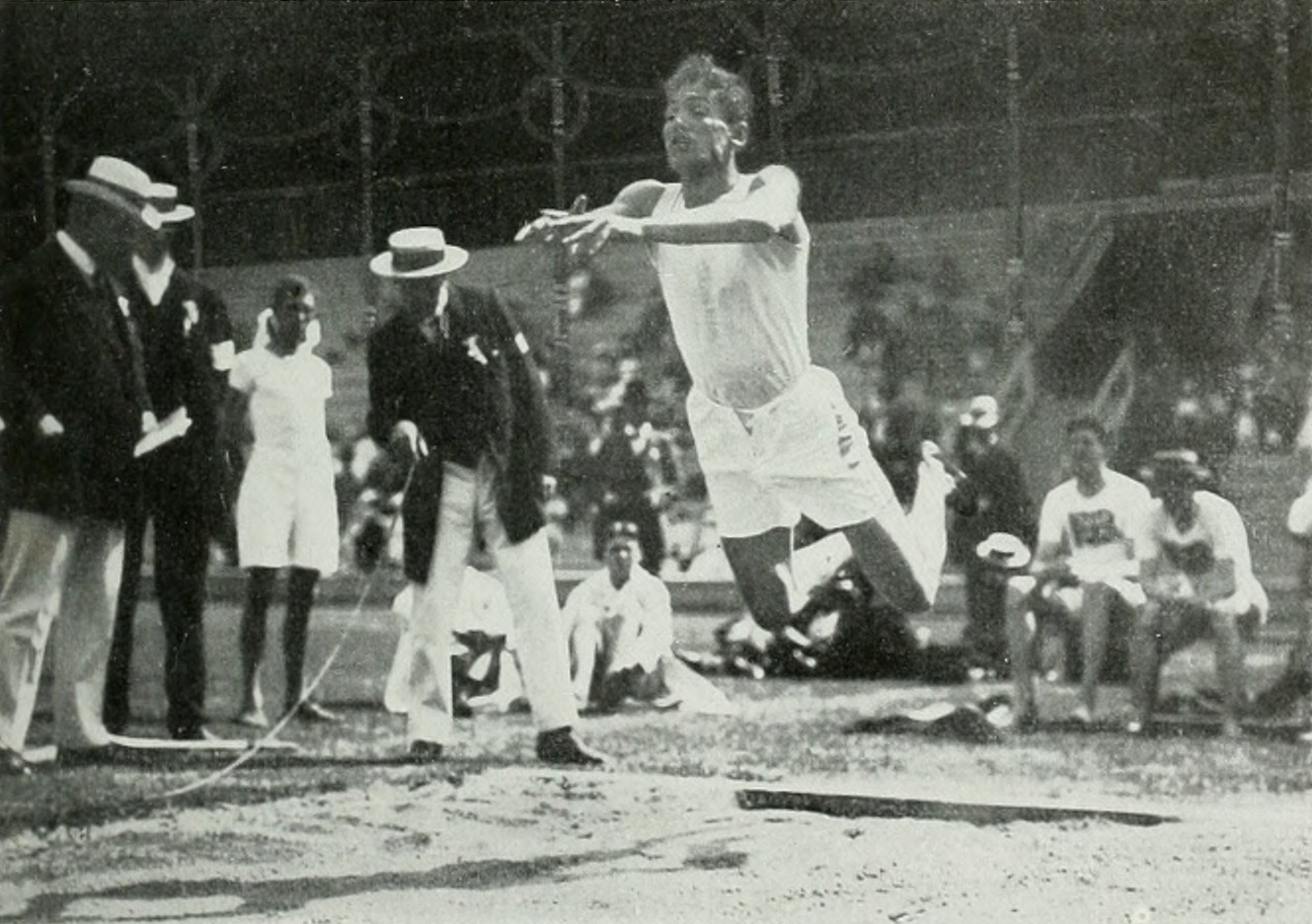
  Konstantinos Tsiklitiras, renowned Olympic long jumper
- Leonidas Tsiklitiras, gymnast
- Aggeliki Tsiolakoudi, javelin thrower
- Chris Tsiprailidis, poker player
- Georgios Tsitas, wrestler
- Stefanos Tsitsipas, tennis player
- Athanasia Tsoumeleka, race walker
- Tryfon Tzanetis, football player
- Alexandros Tziolis, football player
- Stavros Tziortziopoulos, football player
- Alexandros Tzorvas, football player
- Danai Varveri, free diver
- Olga Vasdeki, triple jumper
- Spyridon Vasdekis, long jumper
- Charilaos Vasilakos, marathoner
- Panagiotis Vasilopoulos, basketball player
- Kostas Vassiliadis, basketball player
- Fotini Vavatsi, archer
- Vavis, shooter
- Theodoros Velkos, badminton player
- Stylianos Venetidis, football player
- Tassos Venetis, football player
- Anna Verouli, javelin thrower
- Sotirios Versis, weightlifter
- Kleanthis Vikelides, football player
- Ekateríni Vóggoli, discus thrower
- Ioannis Vourakis, shooter
- Athanasios Vouros, fencer
- Ian Vouyoukas, basketball player
- Ioannis Vrettos, marathoner
- Zisis Vryzas, football player
- Loukas Vyntra, football player
- Níki Xánthou, long jumper
- Thomas Xenakis, gymnast
- Vasilios Xydas, pole vaulter
- Theodoros Zagorakis, football player, captain of Greek team which won 2004 European Championship

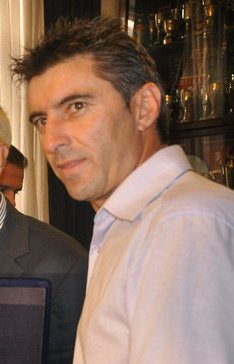
Theodoros Zagorakis, Greece national football team captain during Greece's UEFA Euro 2004 victory

- Akis Zikos, football player
- Nikos Zisis, basketball player
- Khristos Zoumis, triple jumper

== Clerics ==
=== Medieval period ===
- Saints Cyril and Methodius, monks and scholars, inventors of the Cyrillic script
- Saint Nicholas, 4th-century Christian saint and Greek Bishop of Myra (Demre in modern-day Turkey) in Lycia
- Michael Cerularius (c. 1000–1059), Patriarch of Constantinople
- John Chrysostom (347–407), Christian bishop and orator
- Photios I of Constantinople (820–891), Patriarch of Constantinople and writer
- Pope Evaristus (c. 98–105), fourth Pope
- Pope Stephen I (254–257)
- Pope Agatho (678–681)
- Pope John VI (701–705)
- Pope John VII (706–709)
- Pope Alexander V (1409–1410), Roman Catholic Antipope in the Pisan line

=== Modern period ===
- Jacob Palaeologus (c. 1520–1585), Dominican friar, later antitrinitarian theologian; (Greek father)

See also:

- List of Constantinople patriarchs
- List of Greek Orthodox Patriarchs of Jerusalem
- List of Archbishops of Athens
- List of Archbishops of Cyprus

== Entrepreneurs ==
- Giannis Alafouzos, ship-owner, TV station owner (Skai TV), owner of Panathinaikos F.C.
- Yiannis Carras, ship-owner, creator of Porto Carras Resort
- John D. Chandris and family, shipping industry, cruises
- Yiannis (Giannis) Dritsas, inventor of Frappe
- Sir Stelios Haji-Ioannou, entrepreneur, EasyJet founder
- Arianna Huffington, media mogul, Huffington Post founder
- Socrates Kokkalis, telecommunications magnate, former owner of Olympiacos F.C.
- John Latsis, shipping magnate
- Spiro Latsis, banking and shipping magnate
- Evangelos Marinakis, shipowner, TV station owner (Mega Channel), owner of the football clubs Olympiacos F.C. and Nottingham Forest F.C.
- Stavros Niarchos, shipping magnate
- Aristotle Onassis, shipping magnate
- Christina Onassis, shipping magnate
- Athina Onassis, granddaughter of Aristotle Onassis
- Ioannis Pangas, merchant and philanthropist
- Georgios Sinas, banker, diplomat and philanthropist
- Simon Sinas, banker, diplomat and philanthropist
- Basil Zaharoff, arms trader and financier
- Evangelis and Konstantinos Zappas, entrepreneurs and forefathers of modern Olympics
- Georgios Zarifis, banker
- Christakis Zografos, banker

== Explorers ==
=== Ancient period ===
- Androsthenes of Thasos
- Archias of Pella
- Colaeus
- Demodamas
- Eudoxus of Cyzicus
- Euthymenes
- Hippalus
- Megasthenes
- Nearchus
- Patrocles the Geographer
- Pytheas
- Scylax
- Simmias

=== Medieval period ===
- Cosmas Indicopleustes

=== Early Modern ===
- Evstratii Delarov
- Jorge Griego
- Juan de Fuca
- Pedro de Candia

=== Modern ===
- Panayotis Potagos

== Fashion designers ==
- Sophia Kokosalaki (1972–2019), haute couture, women, designer for the 2004 Summer Olympics
- Jean Dessès (1904–1970)
- Mary Katrantzou

== Fashion models ==
- Marios Lekkas
- Anna Rezan
- Julia Alexandratou
- Evagelia Aravani
- Elena Asimakopoulou
- Marietta Chrousala
- Isavella Dara (Miss Europe 1997)
- Mara Darmousli (winner of Elite Model Look contest 1998)
- Valentini Daskaloudi
- Aliki Diplarakou (Miss Europe 1930)

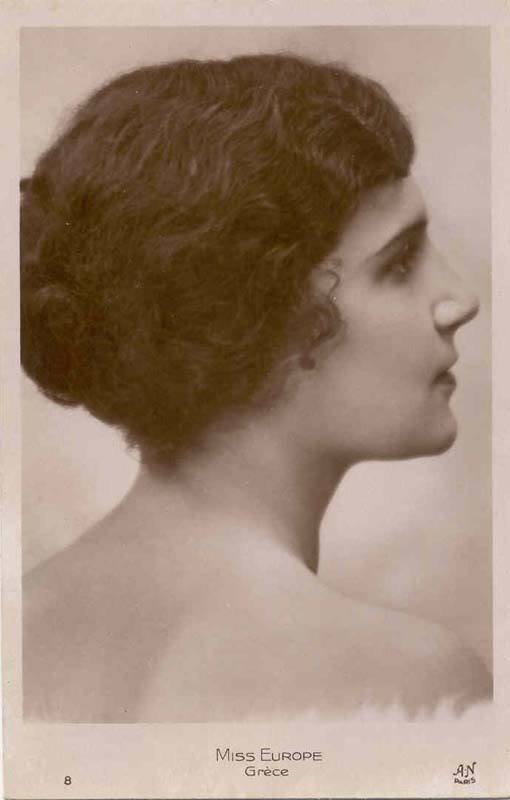
Aliki Diplarakou, Miss Europe 1930

- Katerina Georgiadou
- Jenny Hiloudaki (also DJ)
- Olympia Hopsonidou
- Valia Kakouti
- Katerina Kanonidou
- Irini Karra
- Alex Kavadias
- Vicky Kaya
- Demetres Koutsavlakis
- Olga Kypriotou
- Christina Lekka (Miss International 1994)
- Katia Margaritoglou
- Katerina Michalopoulou (Miss Europe 1991)
- Anna Nanousi
- Evelina Papantoniou
- Chrissoula Rodi
- Panayiotis Simopoulos
- Irene Skliva, Miss World 1996
- Maria Spiridaki
- Katerina Stikoudi
- Marina Tsintikidou, Miss Europe 1992
- Doukissa Nomikou
- Zeta Makrypoulia
- Corinna Tsopei, Miss Universe 1964

== Filmmakers ==
- Theo Angelopoulos, writer and director (Ulysses' Gaze, Eternity and a Day)
- Michael Cacoyannis, writer, producer and director (Zorba the Greek, Electra, Iphigenia)
- Costa-Gavras (Constantinos Gavras), writer, producer and director (Z, State of Siege, Missing)
- Elia Kazan, director in theatre and film (Gentleman's Agreement, A Streetcar Named Desire, On the Waterfront, East of Eden, A Face in the Crowd)
- Nikos Koundouros
- Thodoros Maragos
- Nikos Nikolaidis, writer, producer, and director (Evrydiki BA 2O37, The Wretches Are Still Singing, Sweet Bunch, Morning Patrol, Singapore Sling, See You in Hell, My Darling, The Loser Takes It All, The Zero Years)
- Yorgos Lanthimos, Alps, Dogtooth, The Lobster
- John Cassavetes, Faces, A Woman Under the Influence

== Military and political figures ==
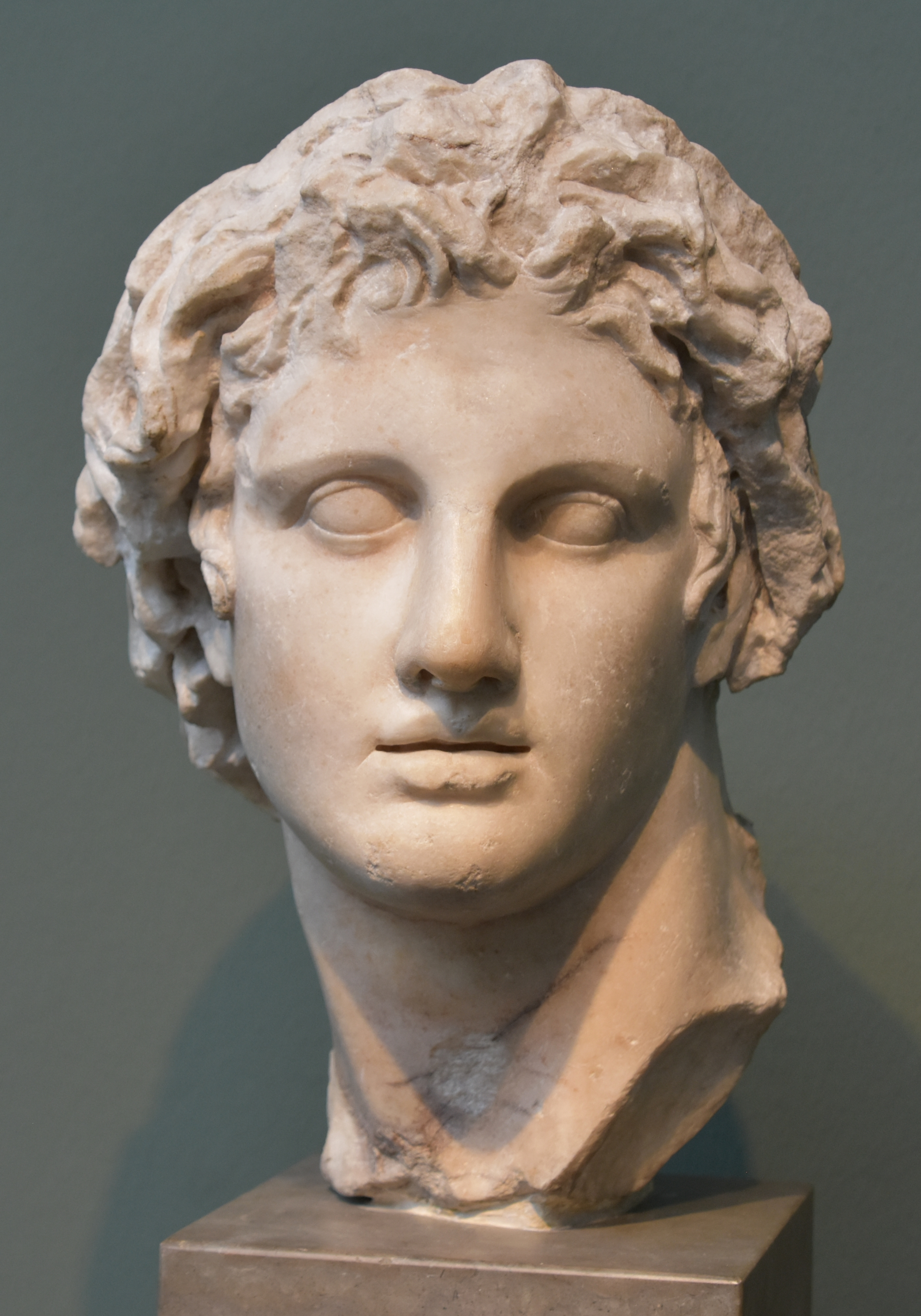
Alexander the Great, king of the ancient Greek kingdom of Macedon, tutored and personally mentored by Aristotle, leader of the Hellenic League, he conquered the Persian Empire, founded the city of Alexandria

=== Ancient period ===
- Agis III (r.338–?331 BCE), Spartan king who rebelled against Macedon in 331 BCE
- Alcibiades (450–404 BCE), Athenian general and statesman
- Alexander the Great (356–323 BCE) King of Macedon, and conqueror of the Persian Empire
- Antiochus III the Great, (c. 241–187 BCE) Seleucid Monarch
- Antipater (c.390–319 BCE), Macedonian noble and Alexander the Great's regent in Macedon
- Aristides (530–468 BCE), Athenian statesman
- Cimon (510–450 BCE), Athenian leader and statesman
- Cleopatra VII Thea Philopator, (c.68–30 BCE) Queen of Egypt, from the Hellenistic Ptolemaic Dynasty
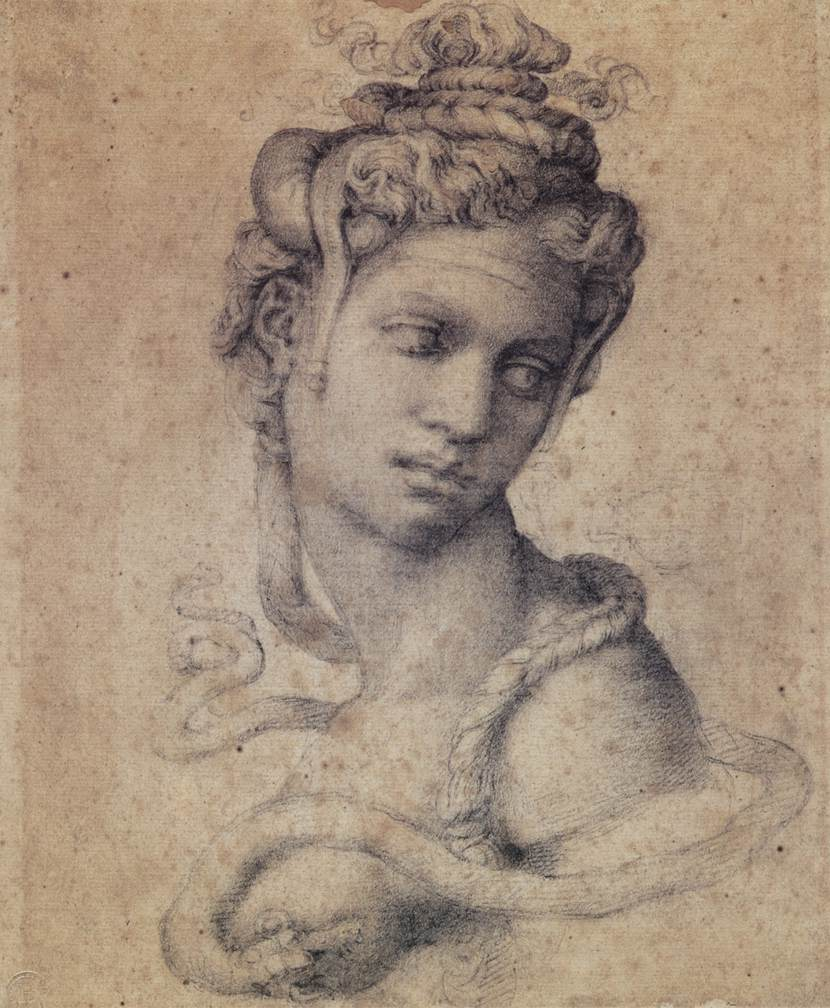
  Michelangelo's rendering of Cleopatra VII Thea Philopator
- Demosthenes (384–322 BCE), politician and orator
- Dionysius I (c.432–367), ruler of the Syracusan empire
- Epaminondas (c.420–362), Theban general and statesman
- Eucratides, ruler of the Bactrian Greeks
- Leonidas (d.480 BCE), Spartan king, killed defending Greece from the Persians
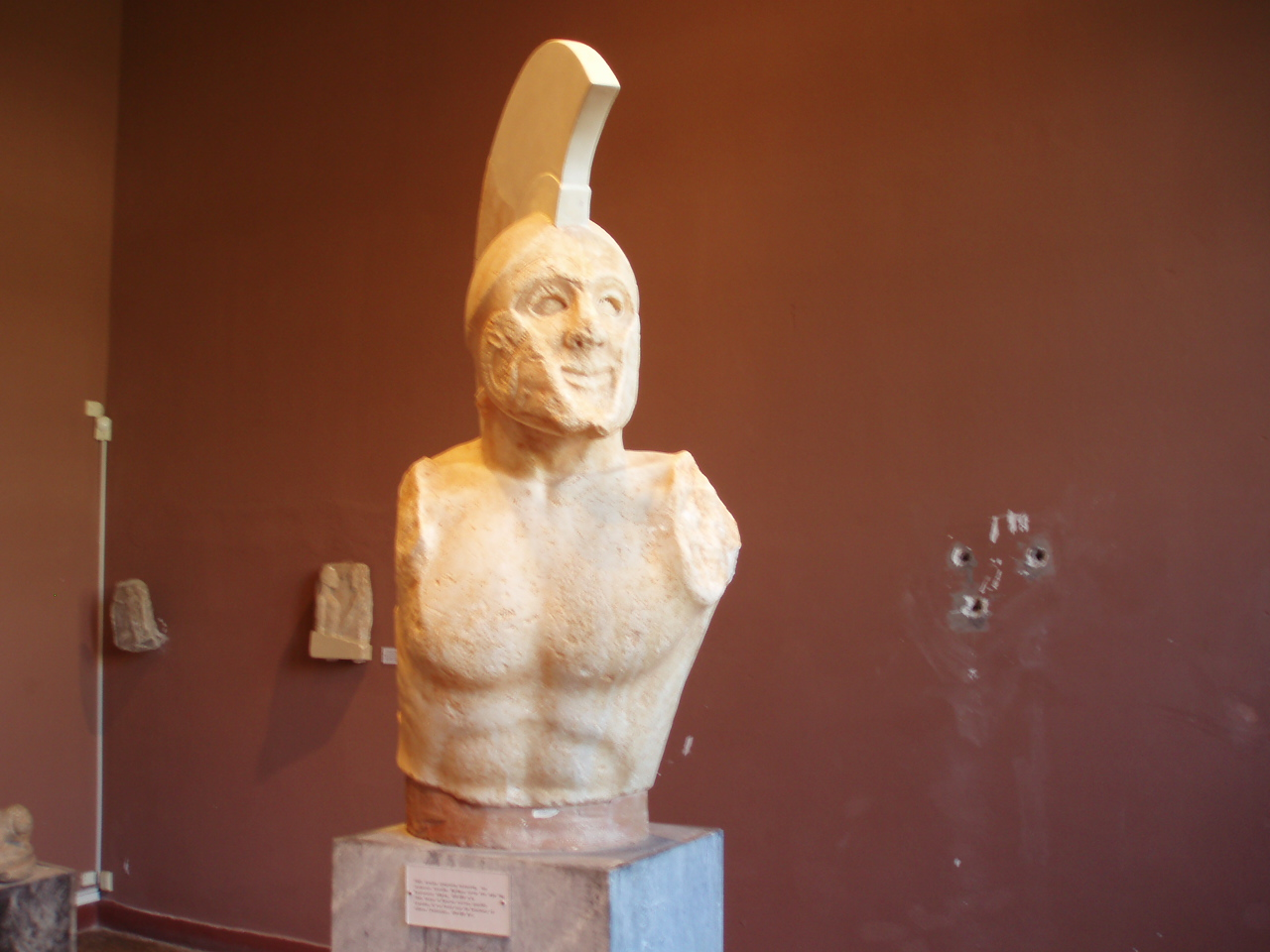
  Bust of Leonidas I, famed king of Sparta who led his troops at the Battle of Thermopylae against a Persian invasion of the Greek city states, perhaps most famous for having told the Persian King Xerxes his "Molon labe", or "Come and take them", when ordered to surrender and to give up his weapons once his unit's position had been betrayed and surrounded
- Lycurgus (9th century BCE), semi-legendary Spartan lawgiver
- Lysander (d.395), Spartan general and hero during the Peloponnesian War
- Memnon of Rhodes (d.333), Greek mercenary general in Persian army under Darius III
- Miltiades, Athenian statesman and general
- Nearchus, Alexander's naval commander
- Peisistratus, Athenian tyrant
- Pericles (495–429 BCE), Athenian leader and statesman
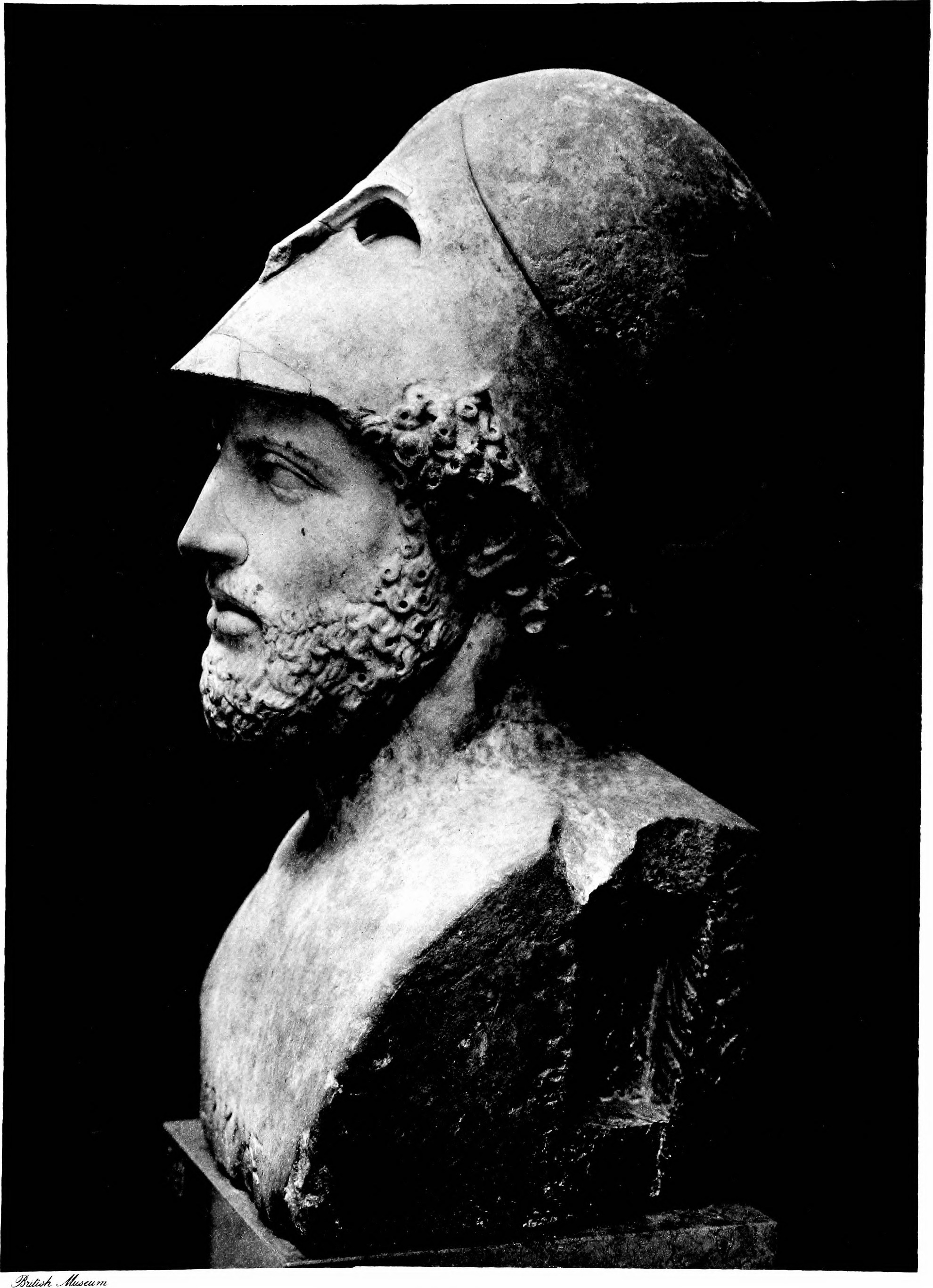
  Pericles, strategos of the city state of Athens during the Peloponnesian War
- Philip II of Macedon (382–336 BCE), Macedonian king and father of Alexander the Great
- Polycrates, Samian ruler
- Ptolemy I (c.356–285), Macedonian general under Alexander the Great, founded a dynasty in Egypt
- Pyrrhus of Epirus (c.318–272), invaded Italy, became known for victories of dubious value (Pyrrhic)
- Seleucus I, Macedonian general under Alexander the Great, founded dynasty in Persia
- Solon (638–558 BCE), Athenian lawmaker and archon
- Themistocles (c.514–449 BCE), Athenian statesman and admiral
- Xenophon (430–c.354 BCE), mercenary general, led and recounted march from Persia
- Saint George (AD c.275–303), soldier in the Roman army, venerated as a Christian martyr

=== Medieval period ===
- Constantine Lascaris, promoters of the revival of Greek learning in the Italian peninsula
- Gemistus Pletho, one of the chief pioneers of the revival of learning in Western Europe
- Manuel Chrysoloras, one of the pioneers in introducing Greek literature to western Europe
- Johannes Bessarion, bishop and cardinal
- Marcus Musurus, professor of Greek language at the University of Padua
- Saint Cyril, Byzantine monk, developed the Glagolitic alphabet
- Theodora (527–548), Byzantine Empress, and wife of Justinian I
- Belisarius? (Note: His origin is disputed, but there are estimates that he was either Illyrian, Greek, or Thracian) Byzantine commander who served under Justinian I. Reconquered Italy and North Africa after the fall of the Western Roman Empire
- Heraclius (610–641), Byzantine Emperor, won the Byzantine–Sasanian War of 602–628
- Irene (797–802), Byzantine Empress, instrumental in the restoration of icons, later sanctified
- Constantine VII (913–959), Byzantine Emperor and scholar, born in the Palace of the Porphyrogenitus
- Basil II (963–1025), Byzantine Emperor, known as the 'Bulgar-Slayer'
- Nikephoros II Phokas (963–969), Byzantine Emperor and general
- Alexios I Komnenos (1048–1118), Byzantine Emperor
- Romanos IV Diogenes (1068–1071), lost the fateful Battle of Manzikert
- Manuel I Komnenos (1143–1180), Byzantine Emperor, was responsible for a distinct revival of Byzantine fortunes until his defeat at Myriokephalon
- Michael VIII Palaiologos (1259–1261, and 1261–1282), Nicene and Byzantine Emperor, recaptured Constantinople from the Latins
- Constantine XI Palaiologos (1449–1453), last Byzantine Emperor, died at the fall of Constantinople

=== Ottoman Empire period ===
- Atik Sinan, architect for Mehmed II and Mustafa III
- Barbarossa (1473–1518), famous privateer, older brother of Khair ad Din; (Greek mother)
- Laskarina Bouboulina, privateer, naval commander, Greek nationalist fighter
- İbrahim Ethem Pasha, Greek-born Grand Vizier
- Khair ad Din (1475–1546), Greek-born Ottoman Turkish Admiral, also known as Barbarossa; (Greek mother)
- Pargalı İbrahim Pasha, Suleyman the Magnificent's first appointed Grand Vizier, who left an important landmark on his reign.
- Alexandra Mavrokordatou (1605–1683), salonist and intellectual.
- Mimar Sinan, architect for Suleiman the Magnificent
- Kosem Sultan
- İshak Pasha, Grand Vizier
- Turgut Reis, Ottoman Admiral
- Al-Husayn I ibn Ali founder of the Husainid Dynasty of Tunisia

=== Modern period ===
==== Greece ====
- Ioannis Kapodistrias (1776–1831), first President of the free and unified Greek state, last President of the first Greek republic
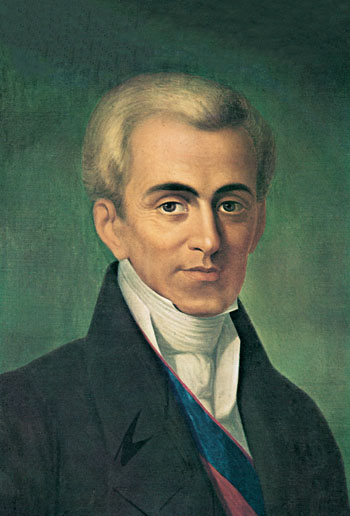
  Ioannis Kapodistrias, first Prime Minister of the modern Greek state
- Georgios Hatzianestis (1863–1922), General
- Konstantinos Kanaris (c. 1794–1877), freedom fighter, admiral, and Prime Minister of Greece
- Constantine I (1868–1923), King of Greece
- Constantine II (1940–2023), King of Greece
- Chrysos Evelpidis (1895–1971), Minister of Agriculture and Minister of Finance
- George II (1890–1947), King of Greece
- Paul (1901–1964), King of Greece
- Nikolaos Gioulekas, Captain in the Greek War of Independence of 1821
- Konstantinos Karamanlis (1907–1998), President of Greece and four-time prime minister
- Kostas Karamanlis (born 1956), Prime Minister of Greece and leader of the New Democracy party – Greek-Macedonian
- Dimitris Plapoutas (1786–1864), Greek General in the Greek War of Independence against the rule of the Ottoman Empire and later a Politician
- Theodoros Kolokotronis (1770–1843), Greek general in the Greek War of Independence against the rule of the Ottoman Empire
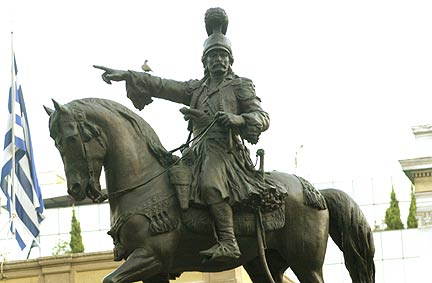
  Theodoros Kolokotronis, leading Greek general in the Greek Revolution for Independence against the Ottoman Empire
- Pavlos Kountouriotis (1855–1935), admiral, war hero and later President of Greece
- Alexandros Mavrokordatos
- Pavlos Melas (1870–1904), hero of Greek Struggle for Macedonia
- Ioannis Metaxas (1871–1941), dictator of Greece before and during the first part of its participation in World War II
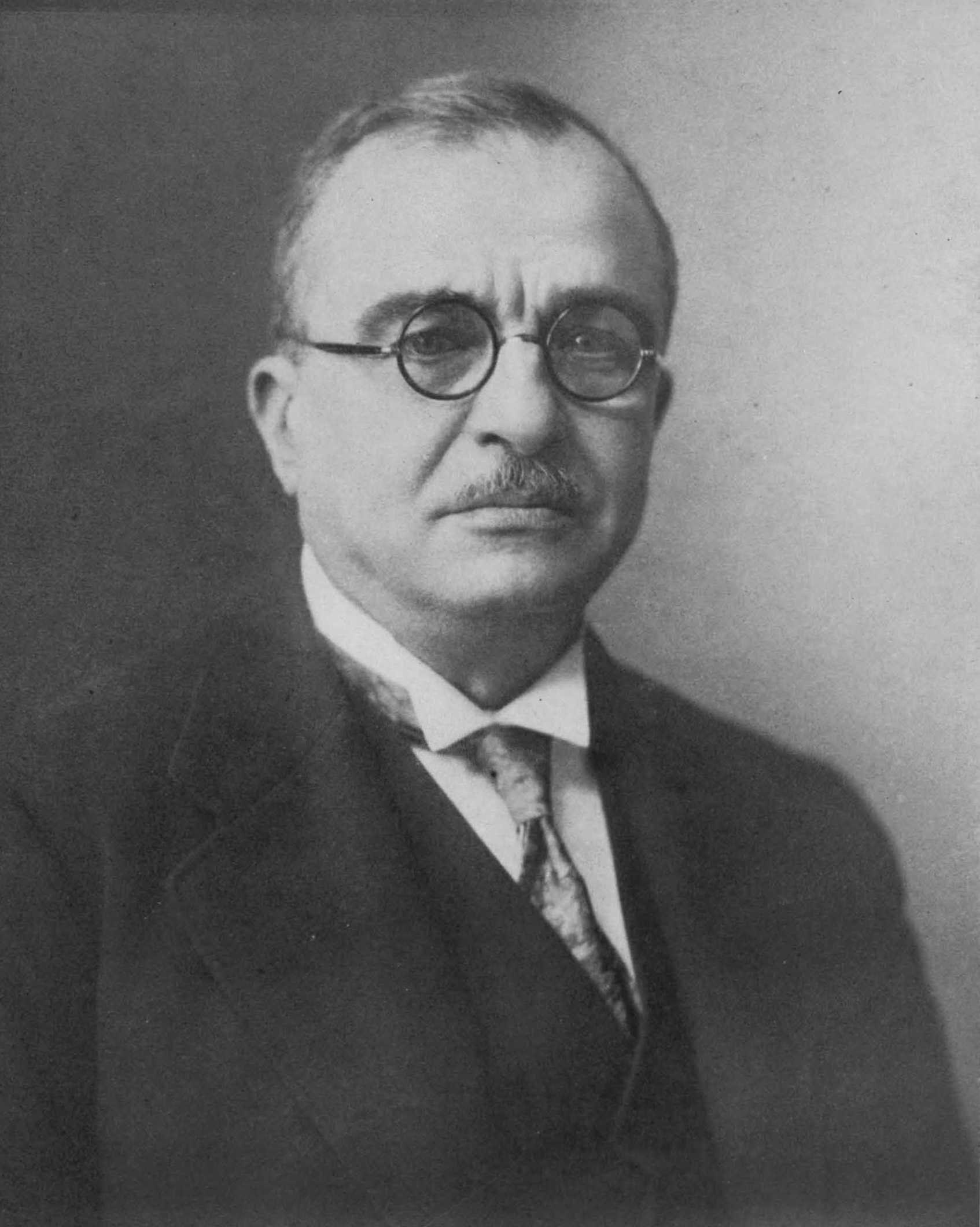
  Ioannis Metaxas in 1937, Fascist dictator of Greece who refused the invasion of Italian troops, famously responding to Benito Mussolini, "Then it is war".
- Andreas Papandreou (1919–1996), economist, politician, and three-time prime minister
- George Andreas Papandreou (born 1952), current leader of the PASOK political party and former Foreign Minister of Greece (1999–2004).
- Aleka Papariga (born 1945), current General Secretary of the Communist Party of Greece (KKE) (1991–)
- Karolos Papoulias (1929–2021), President of Greece (2005–2015)
- Kostas Simitis (born 1936), former prime minister of Greece (1996–2004)
- Kostis Stephanopoulos (1926–2016), former president of Greece (1995–2005)
- Aris Velouchiotis (27 August 1905 – 16 June 1945), born Athanasios (Thanasis) Klaras, leader of Ethnikos Laikos Apeleftherotikos Stratos (ELAS), the communist segment of Greek guerrilla resistance during World War II
- Maria Theofili (fl. from 1990s), diplomat, Permanent Representative of Greece to the United Nations
- Eleftherios Venizelos (1864–1936), Prime Minister of Greece during Balkan Wars and First World War
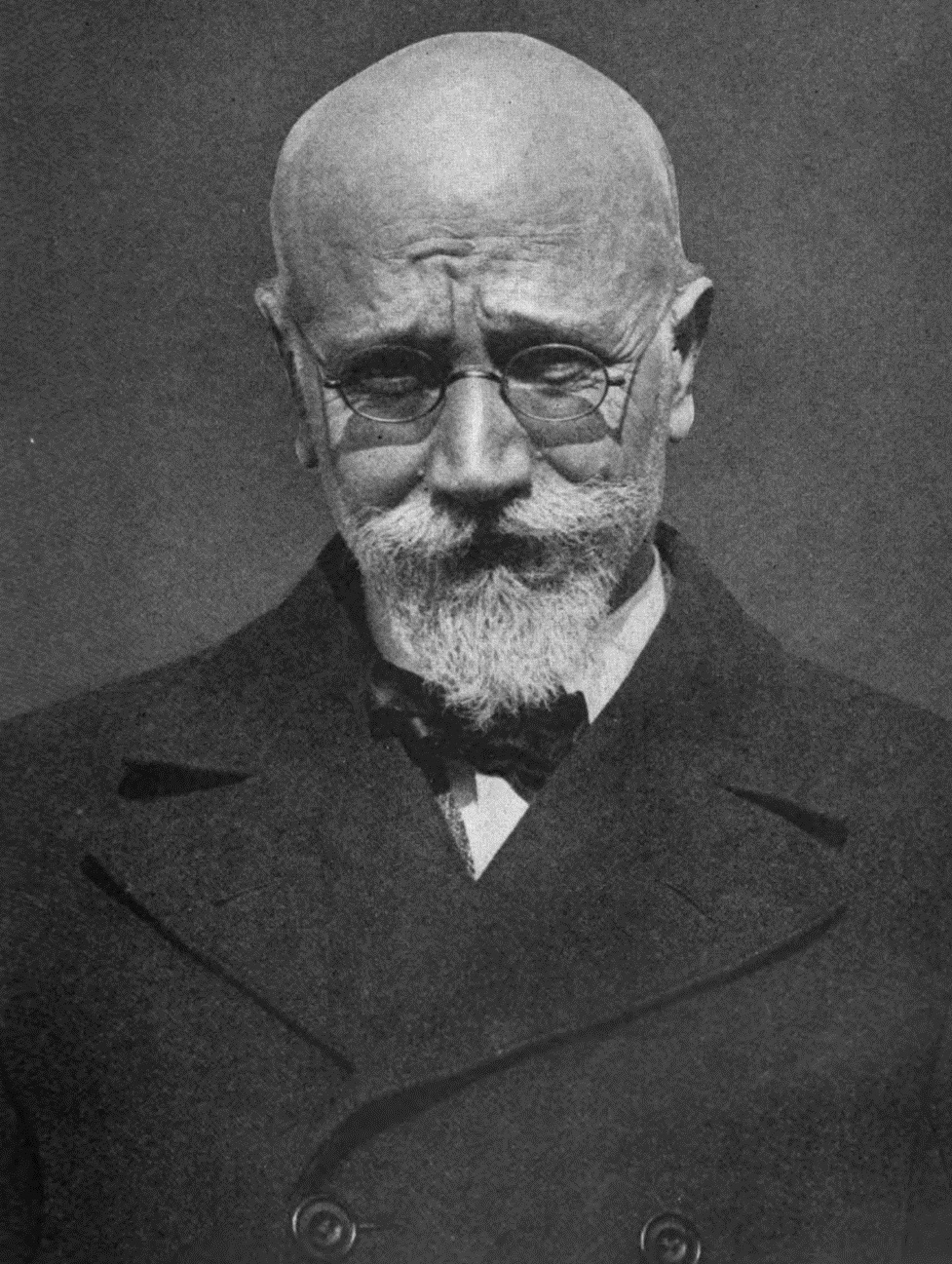
  Eleutherios Venizelos, liberal Prime Minister of Greece during the Balkan Wars and World War I, pushing for a Megali Idea strategy against the Ottoman Empire during the Greco-Turkish War (1919–1922)
- Nikos Zachariadis (1903–1973), former Secretary of the Communist Party of Greece (KKE) (1931–1957)

==== Northern Epirus ====
- Apostolos Arsachis (1792–1874) Greek-Vlach politician and philanthropist, born in Northern Epirus
- Pyrros Dimas (born 1971) retired weightlifter, considered as one of the greatest of all time, having been three times Olympic champion and three times World Champion.
- Dimitris Nanopoulos (born 1948), world-renowned physicist, of a Northern Epirotian descent
- Georgios Sinas (1783–1856), entrepreneur, banker and national benefactor, founder of the Athens National Observatory
- Evangelos Zappas (1800–1865), businessman and philanthropist, recognized today as the founder of the modern Greek Olympic Games
- Georgios Christakis-Zografos (1863–1920), politician, president of the Autonomous Republic of Northern Epirus

==== Canada ====
- John Cannis
- Jim Karygiannis

==== France ====
- Marietta Karamanli, (MP) Socialist Party

==== Romania ====
- Iannis Pharmakis (died 1821), revolutionary fighter
- Cantacuzene family, governors of Bessarabia and Walachia (1678–1688)

==== Spain ====
- Queen Sofía of Spain (born 1938), wife of Spain's king Juan Carlos

==== United Kingdom ====
- Prince Philip, Duke of Edinburgh (1921–2021), husband of UK's queen Elizabeth II, born on the island of Corfu

==== Australia ====
- Petro Georgiou, federal politician
- Maria Vamvakinou, politician

==== United States ====
- George Christopher, Mayor of San Francisco, California from 1956 to 1964
- Arianna Huffington (née Arianna Stassinopoulos), liberal pundit and blogger

== Musicians ==
=== Ancient period ===
- Alypius, composer
- Terpander, poet and kitharode

=== Modern period ===
- Rita Abatzi, musician
- Maurice Abravanel, conductor
- Haris Alexiou, singer
- Louis Demetrius Alvanis (born 1960), pianist
- Steve Angello, DJ, producer, member of Swedish House Mafia
- Theodore Antoniou, composer and conductor
- Grigoris Asikis, singer and lyricist
- Nikolas Asimos, singer and composer
- Nicolas Astrinidis, Romanian-born composer who settled in Thessaloniki
- Gina Bachauer, pianist
- Yiorgos Batis, musician
- Grigoris Bithikotsis, popular singer and lyricist
- Miltiades Caridis, conductor
- Pavlos Carrer, composer
- Petros Christo, guitarist
- Nikos Christodoulou, composer and conductor
- Jani Christou, composer
- Christos Dantis, singer and musician
- Dionysios Demetis, composer
- Odysseas Dimitriadis (1908–2005), conductor
- Marina Diamandis, singer for Marina and the Diamonds
- Dimitris Dragatakis, composer
- Antiochos Evangelatos, composer and conductor
- Kostas Exarhakis, musician
- Maria Farantouri (born 1947), singer
- Yorgos Foudoulis (born 1964), guitarist and composer
- Eleni Foureira (born 1987), singer
- Gus G, guitarist
- Katy Garbi, singer
- Michalis Genitsaris, singer and composer
- Christos Govetas, musician
- Manos Hadjidakis (1925–1994), composer
- Alkinoos Ioannidis, singer and composer
- Sotiris Kakisis, poet
- George Kallis, composer
- Manolis Kalomiris (1883–1962), composer
- Iakovos Kambanelis, poet and lyricist
- Alex Kapranos, frontman of the Scottish rock band Franz Ferdinand

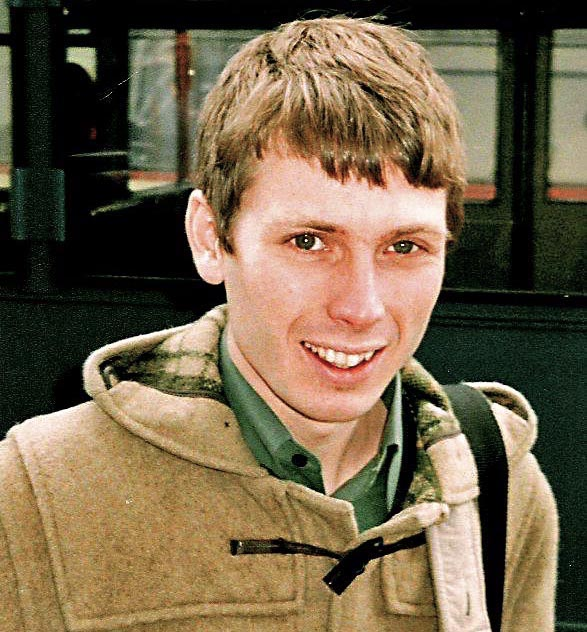
Franz Ferdinand vocalist and guitarist Alex Kapranos

- Eleni Karaindrou, composer
- Herbert von Karajan (Herbert Karajannis) (1908–1989), Austrian conductor of Greek origin
- Nikos Karvelas, composer
- Antonios Katinaris, musician
- Bob Katsionis, musician
- Akis Katsoupakis (born 1972), musician, composer, and record producer
- Leonidas Kavakos (born 1967), violinist
- Stelios Kazantzidis, singer
- Areti Ketime, musician
- Panayiotis Kokoras, musician and composer
- Iakovos Kolanian, guitarist
- George Kollias, drummer
- Maria Kolokouri, black metal vocalist and multi-instrumentalist
- Yannis Kotsiras, singer and songwriter
- Stavros Koujioumtzis (1932–2005), composer and lyricist
- Rena Kyriakou, pianist
- Andreas Lagios, guitarist
- Alexandre Lagoya, guitarist
- Leo Leandros, musician and composer
- Tommy Lee, drummer (American of Greek ancestry)

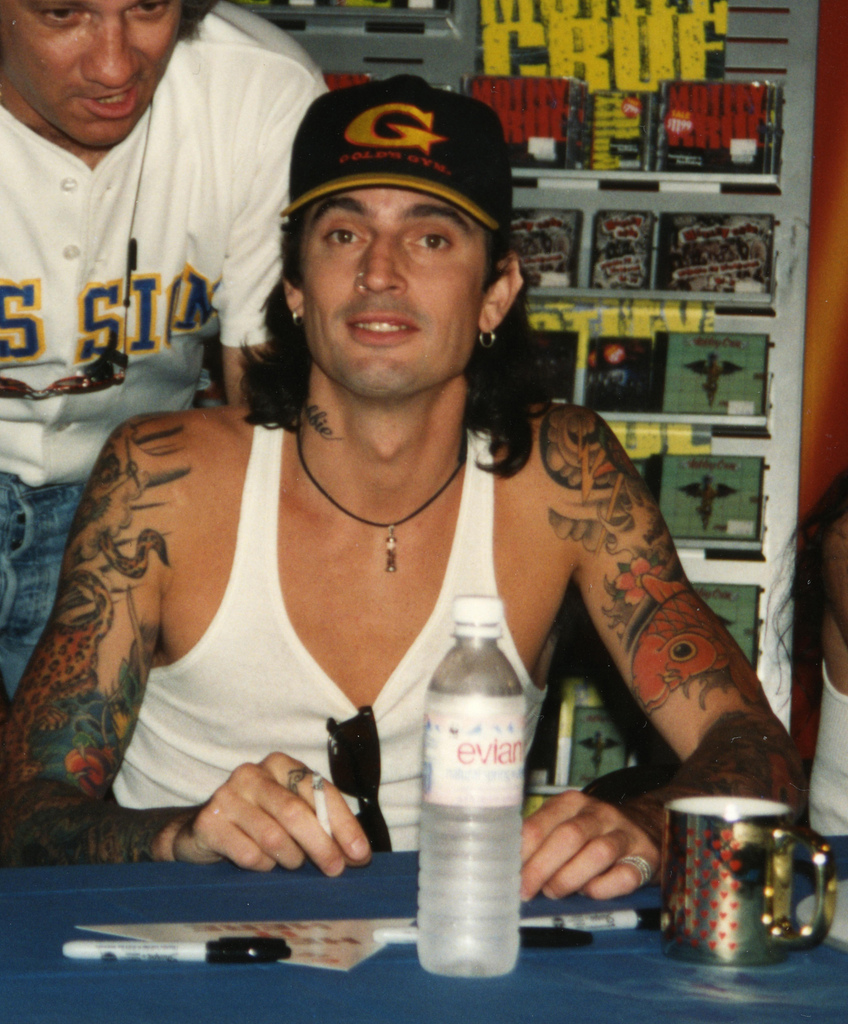
Mötley Crüe drummer Tommy Lee

- Manos Loizos (1937–1982), composer
- Sokratis Malamas, singer and musician
- Nikolaos Mantzaros, composer
- Giannis Markopoulos, composer
- Kostas Martakis, singer
- Marinella, singer-songwriter

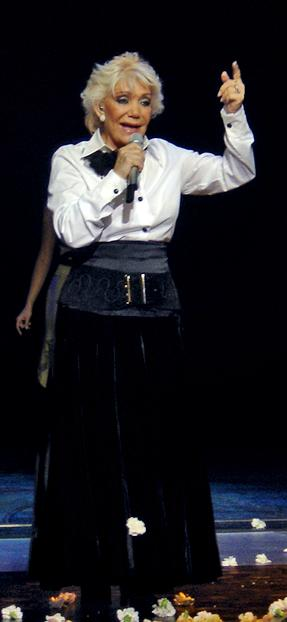
Marinella in 2006, classical Greek singer and songwriter

- Thanos Mikroutsikos, composer
- Dimitri Minakakis, former singer for mathcore band The Dillinger Escape Plan
- Dimitris Mitropanos, laïkó singer
- Dimitris Mitropoulos, conductor
- Kostas Mountakis, musician
- Takis Mousafiris, composer and songwriter
- Georges Moustaki, Greek-French singer and lyricist
- Sarah P., musician, lyricist, singer
- Orianthi Panagaris, singer
- Georgios Kyriacos Panayiotou (George Michael), singer-songwriter (English of Greek ancestry)
- Tzimis Panousis, musician
- Lefteris Papadimitriou, composer and performer
- Lefteris Papadopoulos, poet and lyricist
- Thanassis Papakonstantinou, singer and lyricist
- Helena Paparizou, singer, winner of the Eurovision Song Contest 2005
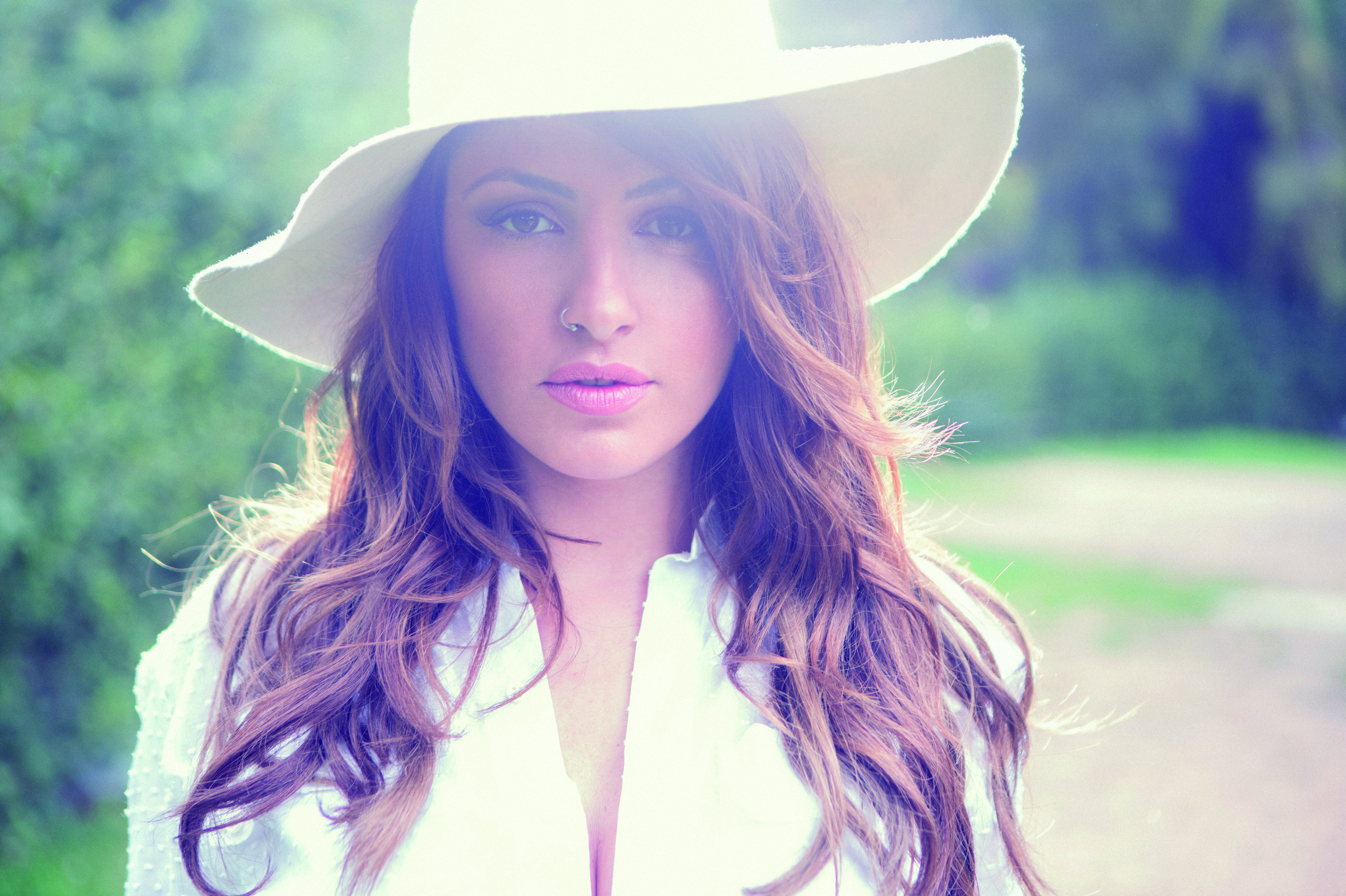
  Helena Paparizou in 2013, Eurovision winner of 2005
- Apostolos Paraskevas, composer and classical guitarist
- Stelios Perpiniadis, musician
- Yannis Philippakis, frontman of British rock band Foals
- Phivos, lyricist
- Sadahzinia, musician
- Sakis Rouvas, singer and guitarist
- Spyros Samaras, composer
- Kalomira Sarantis, singer-songwriter, winner of second Fame Story season, third place at Eurovision Song Contest 2008
- Dionysis Savvopoulos, singer, composer and lyricist
- Kyriakos Sfetsas, composer
- Dimitris Sgouros, pianist
- Pavlos Sidiropoulos, musician
- Nikos Skalkottas, composer
- Kostas Skarvelis, composer
- Camille-Marie Stamaty, Greek-French composer-pianist
- Paschalis Terzis, singer
- Mikis Theodorakis (1925–2021), composer
- Sonia Theodoridou, opera singer
- Giorgos Theofanous, composer
- Marios Tokas, composer of Cypriot origin
- Sakis Tolis, musician
- Tatiana Troyanos, mezzo-soprano
- Eleni Tsaligopoulou (born 1963), singer
- Iovan Tsaous, musician and composer
- Vassilis Tsitsanis, popular composer
- Markos Vamvakaris, popular composer of rebetiko
- Despina Vandi, singer
- Vangelis (Evangelos Odysseas Papathanassiou) (1943–2022), musician and composer
- Anna Rezan, performer and lyricist
- Marios Varvoglis, composer
- Anna Vissi, singer
- Haris Xanthoudakis, composer
- Stavros Xarhakos, composer and MEP
- Iannis Xenakis (1922–2001), composer
- Nikos Xilouris, singer and composer
- Nikos Xydakis, pianist and singer
- Spyridon Xyndas, composer and guitarist
- Mirka Yemendzakis, musician
- Yanni (born 1954), composer, pianist, keyboardist

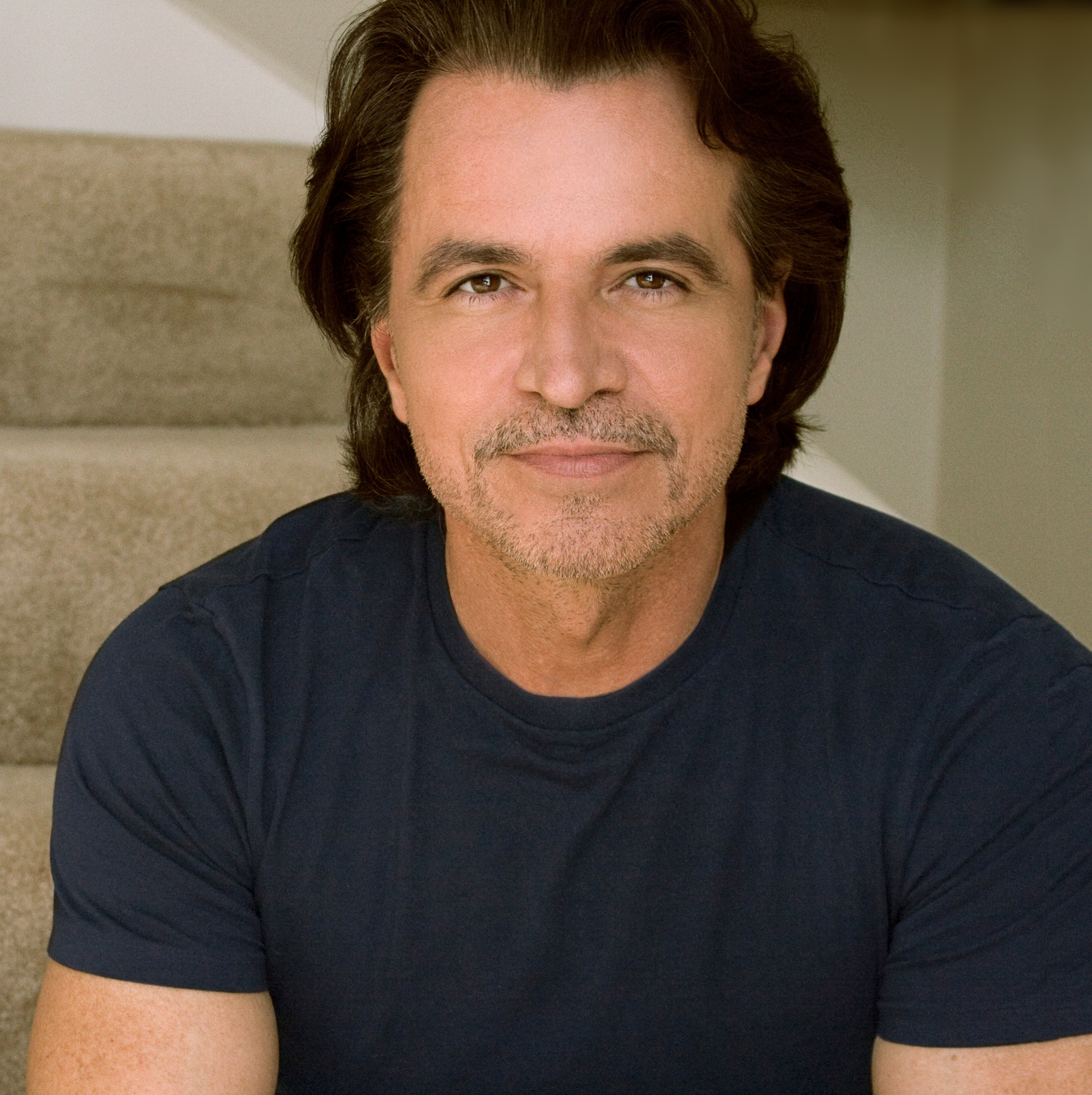
Yanni, Kalamata native world-famous Greek composer, pianist and keyboardist

- Savvas Ysatis, musician
- George Zervanos (1930–2006), operatic tenor

== Painters ==
=== Ancient period ===
- Apelles
- Aetion (4th century BCE)
- Berlin Painter
- Euphronius
- Exekias
- Parrhasius
- Polygnotus
- Zeuxis

=== Renaissance ===
- El Greco (1541–1614), born Domenicos Theotokopoulos
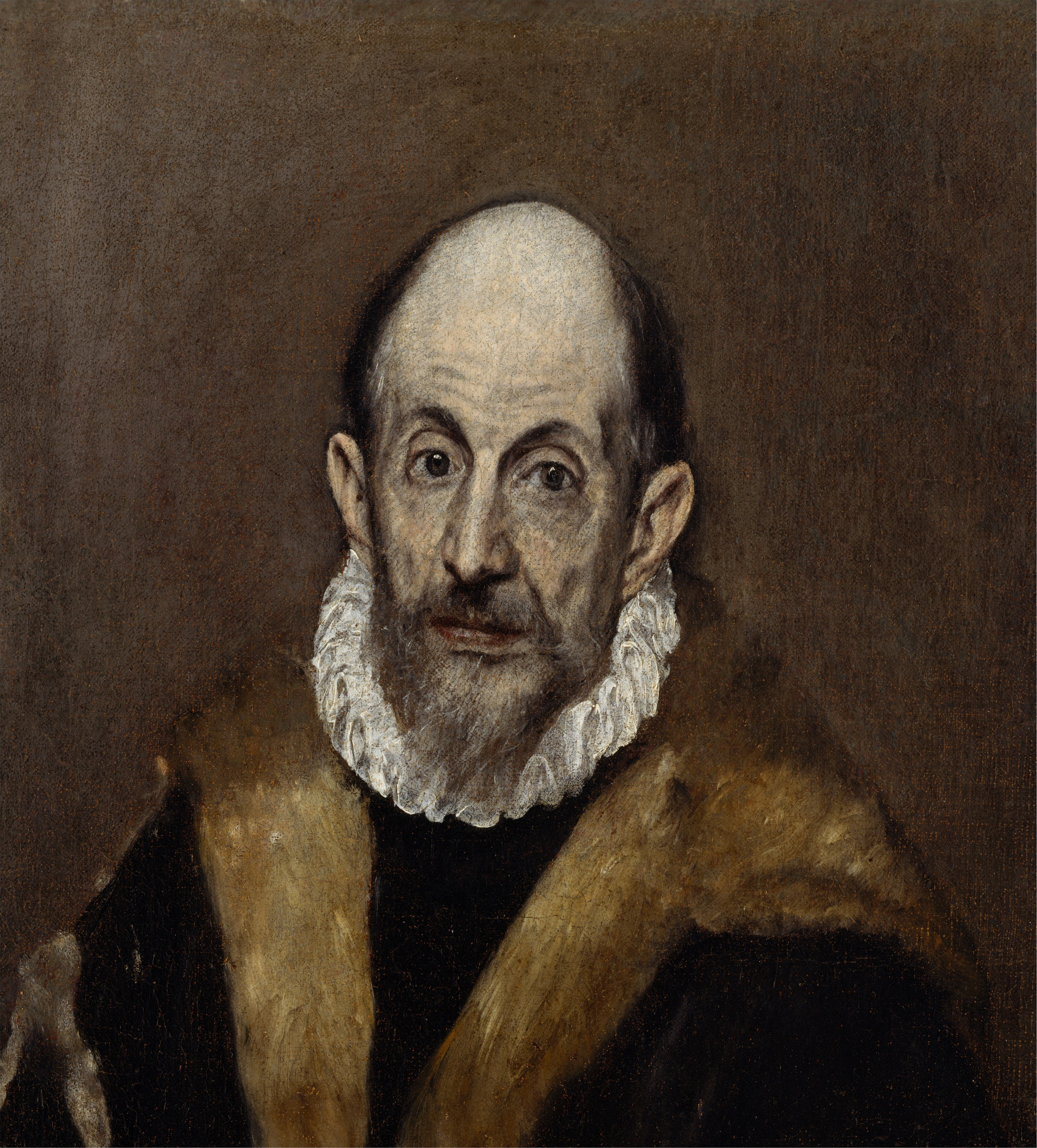
  El Greco: Portrait of a Man (presumed self-portrait, c. 1595–1600)
- Antonio Vassilacchi

=== Modern period ===
- Theophilos Hatzimihail (19th century)
- Demetrios Galanis (19th century)
- Nicholaos Gysis (19th century)
- Nikos Hadjikyriakos-Ghikas (20th century)
- Christos Kapralos
- Nikiphoros Lytras (19th century)
- Nikos Nikolaou (20th century)
- Konstantinos Parthenis (20th century)
- Yannis Tsarouchis (20th century)
- Odysseus Yakoumakis (21st century)
- Spyros Vassiliou (20th century)

== Philosophers ==
Bust of Aristotle, the most influential and cited philosopher in history, student of Plato and teacher and tutor of Alexander the Great

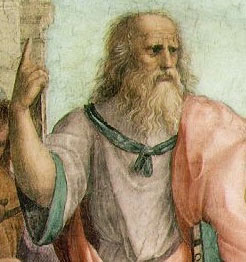
Plato, as painted by Michelangelo, whose The Republic and other works on morality and politics are listed as some of the most influential works in philosophy

=== Ancient period ===
- Anaxarchus of Abdera (c. 380–320 BCE)
- Anaximander (c. 610–546 BCE)
- Anaximenes of Miletus (c. 585–528 BCE)
- Archimedes (c. 287–212 BCE)
- Aristotle (384–322 BCE)
- Athenagoras of Athens (c. 133–190), early Christian apologist
- Celsus (second century CE)
- Democritus (c. 460–370 BCE)
- Diogenes of Sinope (412–323 BCE)
- Empedocles (490–430 BCE)
- Epictetus (55–c. 135 CE)
- Epicurus (341–270 BCE)
- Epimenides (seventh or sixth century BCE), semi-mythical Greek seer
- Eratosthenes (c. 276–195 BCE), mathematician, geographer, poet, astronomer, and music theorist
- Gregory of Nazianzus (c. 329 – 25 January 390)
- Gregory of Nyssa (c. 335–395)
- Hecataeus of Abdera (fourth century BCE)
- Heraclitus (c. 535–475 BCE)
- Hypatia of Alexandria (c. 360–415 CE)
- Irenaeus (c. 140–202 CE)
- Leucippus (fifth century BCE)
- Parmenides (late sixth or early fifth century BCE)
- Pherecydes of Syros (sixth century BCE)
- Plato (c. 427–347 BCE)
- Plotinus (c. 205–270 CE)
- Protagoras (c. 490–420 BCE)
- Pyrrho (c. 360 – c. 270 BC), founder of Pyrrhonism
- Pythagoras (582–496 BCE)
- Sextus Empiricus (c. 160 – c. 210 CE)
- Socrates (470–399 BCE)
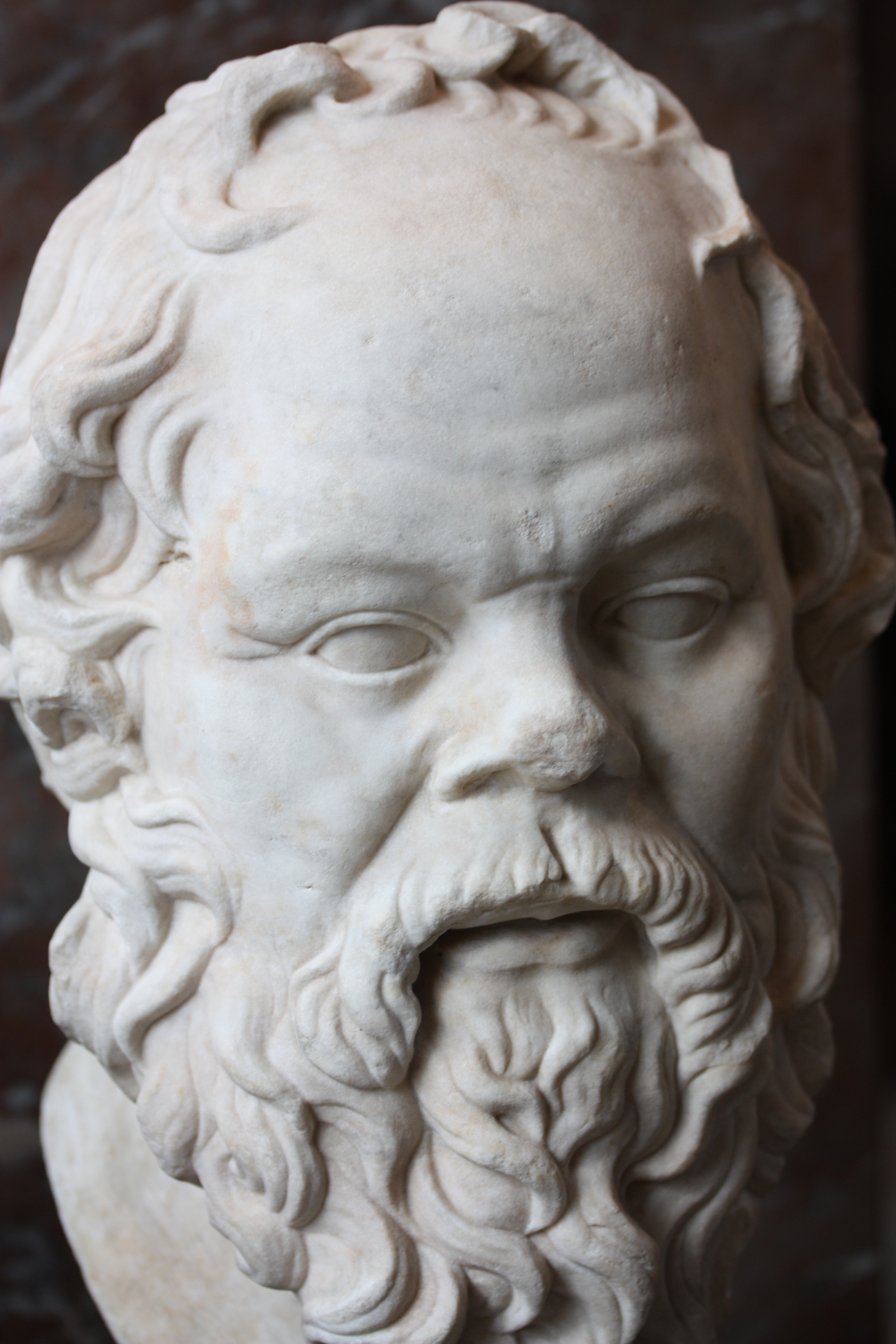
  Socrates, teacher of Plato, Xenophon, Antisthenes, and Aristippus
- Thales of Miletus (c. 624–547 BCE)
- Theagenes of Patras (fl. c. 160 CE)
- Theophrastus (c. 371–287 BCE)
- Xenophanes (c. 570–475 BCE)
- Zeno of Citium (333–264 BCE)
- Zeno of Elea (c. 495–430 BC)

=== Medieval period ===
- Plethon (c. 1355–1452)
- Michael Psellos (c. 1018–1078 or 1096)

=== Modern period ===
- Kostas Axelos (1924–2010)
- Cornelius Castoriadis (1922–1997)
- Takis Fotopoulos (born 1940)
- Anthimos Gazis (1758–1828)
- Nikos Kazantzakis (1883–1957)
- Adamantios Korais (1748–1833)
- Helle Lambridis (1896–1970)
- Michail Papageorgiou (1727–1796)
- Nicos Poulantzas (1936–1979)
- Ioannis Theodorakopoulos (1900–1981)
- Christos Yannaras (1935–2024)

== Scientists, engineers, and academics ==
=== Ancient period ===
- Anaximander
- Apollonius of Perga
- Archimedes

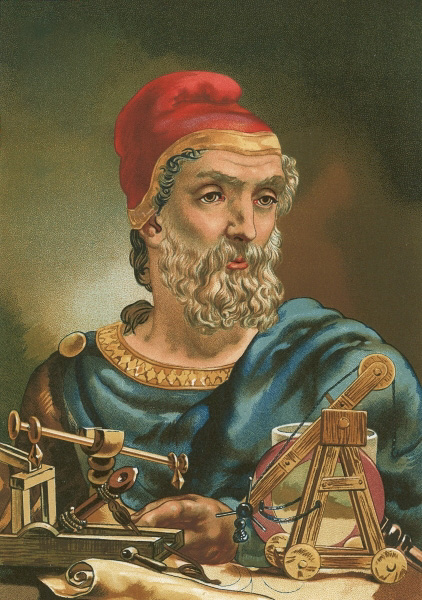
Archimedes, ancient influential inventor and scientist who spearheaded insights into mathematical calculus

- Archytas
- Aristarchos of Samos
- Aristotle
- Autolycus of Pitane
- Ctesibius
- Diophantus
- Echephyllides, Ancient Greek grammarian or historian
- Eratosthenes
- Euclid

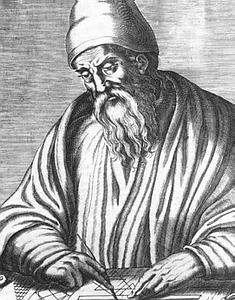
Euclid, mathematician and inventor, famous still today for his Elements

- Eudoxus of Cnidus
- Eupalinos
- Galen
- Heron of Alexandria
- Herophilos
- Hipparchos
- Hippocrates
- Meton of Athens
- Parmenides
- Posidonios
- Ptolemy
- Pythagoras of Samos
- Sostratus of Cnidus
- Strabo
- Thales of Miletus
- Theon
- Theopompus

=== Medieval period ===
- Anthemius of Tralles, involved in the construction of the Haghia Sophia
- Isidore of Miletus, 6th-century polymath, principally in charge of design and construction of the Haghia Sophia
- Paul of Aegina, 7th-century physician best known for writing the medical encyclopedia Medical Compendium in Seven Books
- Leon the Mathematician, 9th-century geometer, subject of a bidding war between the Byzantine Emperor and Caliph al-Mamun
- Callinicus of Heliopolis, engineer and inventor of Greek fire

=== Modern period ===
- Manolis Andronikos, archaeologist
- Helene Ahrweiler, byzantinologist
- Chris Argyris, organisational theorist
- Ioannis Argyris, mathematician, Finite Element Method
- Phaedon Avouris, nanotechnologist
- Konstantinos Axelos, 1960s Situationist
- Apostolos Athanassakis, classicist
- Constantin Carathéodory, mathematician

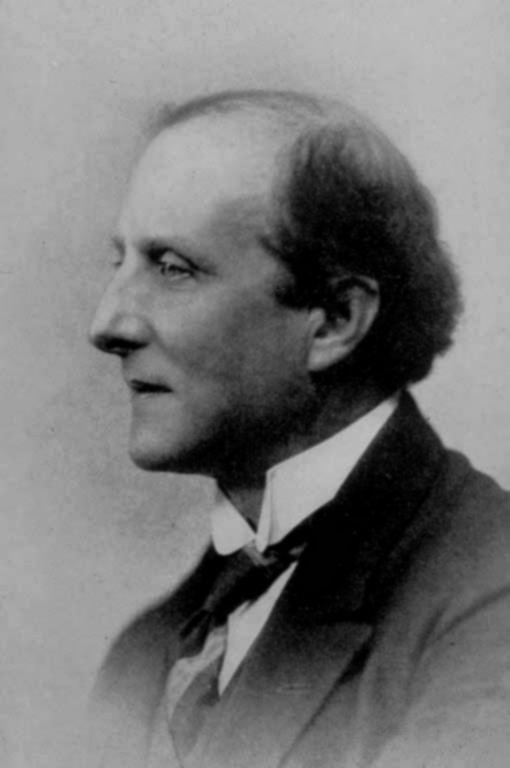
Constantin Carathéodory, acclaimed mathematician and scientist, mentor and teacher to Albert Einstein

- Demetrios Christodoulou, mathematical physicist
- George P. Chrousos, clinical investigator in pediatrics
- George Constantinides, economist
- Constantinos Daskalakis, computer scientist
- Michael L. Dertouzos, former Director of the M.I.T. Laboratory for Computer Science
- Hélène Emmanuel-Zavizziano (1908–1990), Greek chemical engineer attached to Marie Curie
- Helen Fessas-Emmanouil, architect
- Athanassios S. Fokas, mathematician, integrable nonlinear partial differential equations
- Dimitrios Galanos, Sanskrit translator and Indologist
- John Iliopoulos, physicist
- Fotis Kafatos, biologist and founding president of the European Research Council
- Anthony Kaldellis, historian
- Jannis Kallinikos, organisational theorist
- Dimitri Kitsikis, historian and political scientist, Turkologist, Sinologist, poet
- Andreas Mandelis, photonics expert
- Spyridon Marinatos, archaeologist
- Doula Mouriki, Byzantine art historian
- Dimitrios Nanopoulos, astrophysicist
- Nicholas Negroponte, Greek-American founder and Chairman Emeritus of Massachusetts Institute of Technology's Media Lab
- Christos Papadimitriou, computer scientist
- Irena Papadopoulos, author and professor of transcultural nursing
- Christos Papakyriakopoulos, mathematician
- Georgios Papanikolaou, doctor, Pap smear inventor

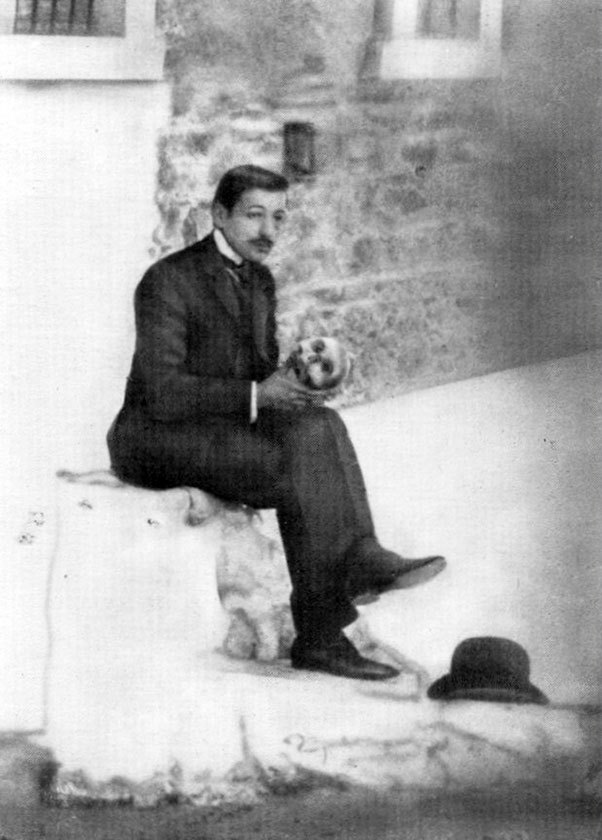
Georgios Papanikolaou, scientist and inventor; developed the pap test, named after him, in order to treat and prevent ovarian cancer

- John S. Paraskevopoulos, astronomer
- Nicholas A. Peppas, chaired professor in Engineering, University of Texas at Austin
- Sotirios Prapas, cardiac surgeon
- Raphael Salem, mathematician
- Linos-Alexander Sicilianos, jurist
- Joseph Sifakis, computer scientist
- Catharine Titi, jurist
- Vladimir Triandafillov (Triantafyllidis), military strategist
- Haridimos Tsoukas, organisational theorist
- George Vithoulkas, teacher of homeopathic medicine
- Panayiotis Zavos, geneticist
- Xenophon Zolotas, economist

== Sculptors ==
=== Ancient period ===
- Agesandros, Athanadoros and Polidoros, composed the Laocoön group
- Agasias
- Callicrates, relief artist, worked on the Parthenon under the direction of Pheidias
- Lysippus
- Myron
- Phidias, sculptor of the colossal statue of Zeus, one of the Seven Wonders of the World
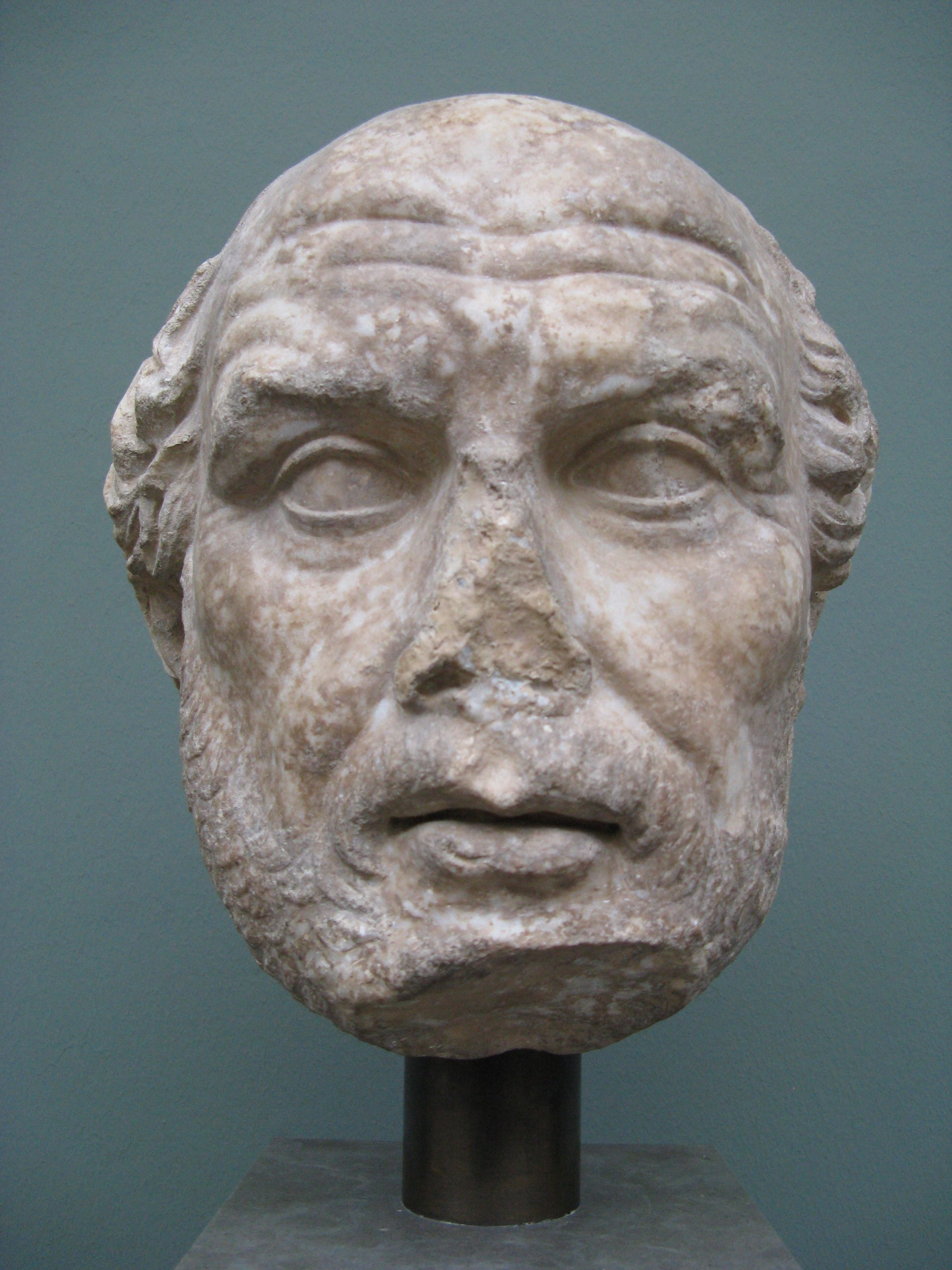
  The Sculptor Phidias best known for his sculptures of the Seven Wonders of the World masterpieces for the Temple of Zeus
- Polyclitus
- Polyeuctes
- Pheidias
- Praxiteles
- Scopas

=== Modern period ===
- Constantine Andreou (20th century)
- Jannis Kounellis
- Kyveli Makri
- Memos Makris
- Thodoros Papadimitriou
- Nikolaos Pavlopoulos
- Panayiotis Vassilakis
- Electros Vekris
- Lydia Venieri
- Constantin Xenakis
- Takis

== Tycoons ==
- Socratis Kokkalis, telecommunications
- Paris Latsis, shipping
- Yiannis Latsis, shipping
- George Livanos, shipping
- Stavros Niarchos, shipping
- Aristotle Onassis, shipping

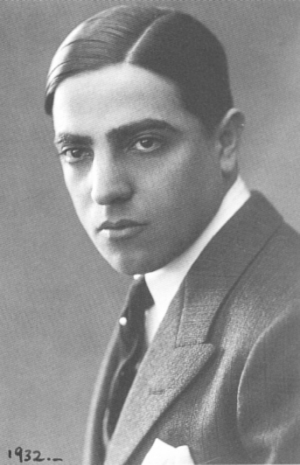
Aristotle Onassis in 1932, who later would create one of the largest shipping conglomerates of his day; married American first lady and widow Jacqueline Kennedy Onassis

- John Paul Papanicolaou, shipping

== Writers ==
=== Ancient period ===
- Aeschylus
- Aesop

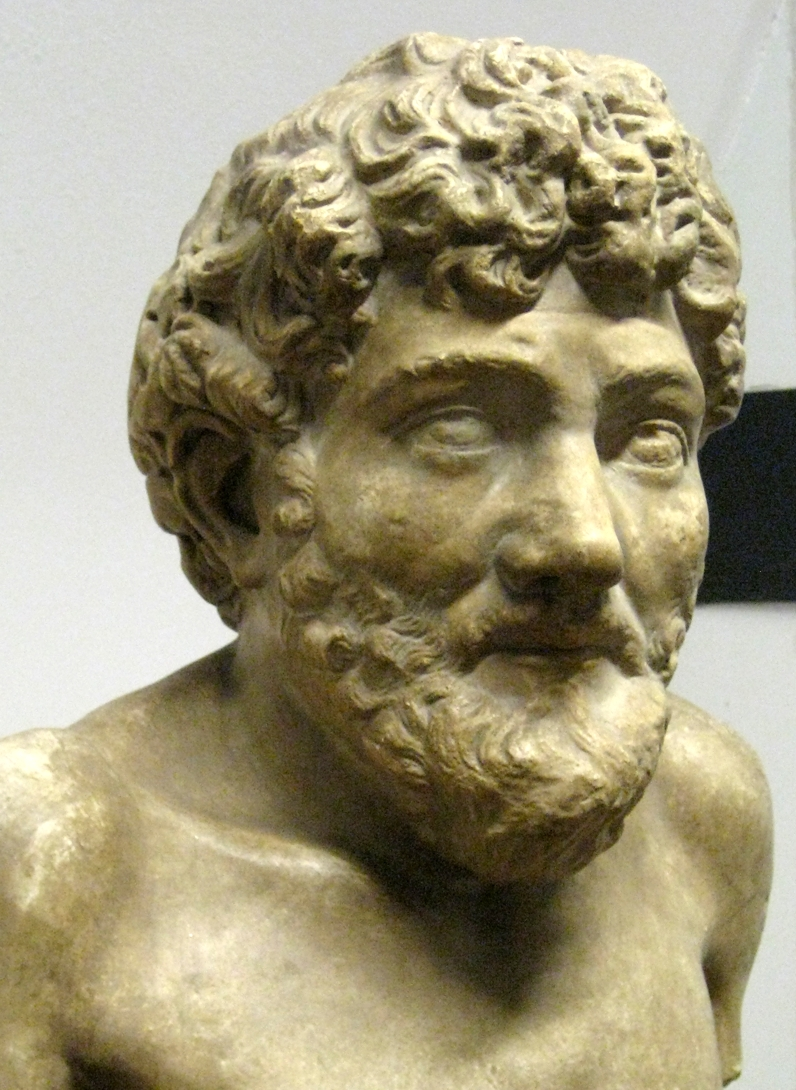
Aesop, accredited with the Fables

- Alcaeus
- Alcman
- Alexander Aetolus
- Anacreon
- Apollodorus
- Apollonius Rhodius
- Aristarchus of Samothrace
- Aristophanes
- Aristophanes of Byzantium
- Callimachus
- Cassius Dio
- Dionysius Thrax
- Euripides
- Eusebius of Caesarea
- Hecataeus of Miletus
- Hecataeus of Abdera
- Hesiod
- Homer

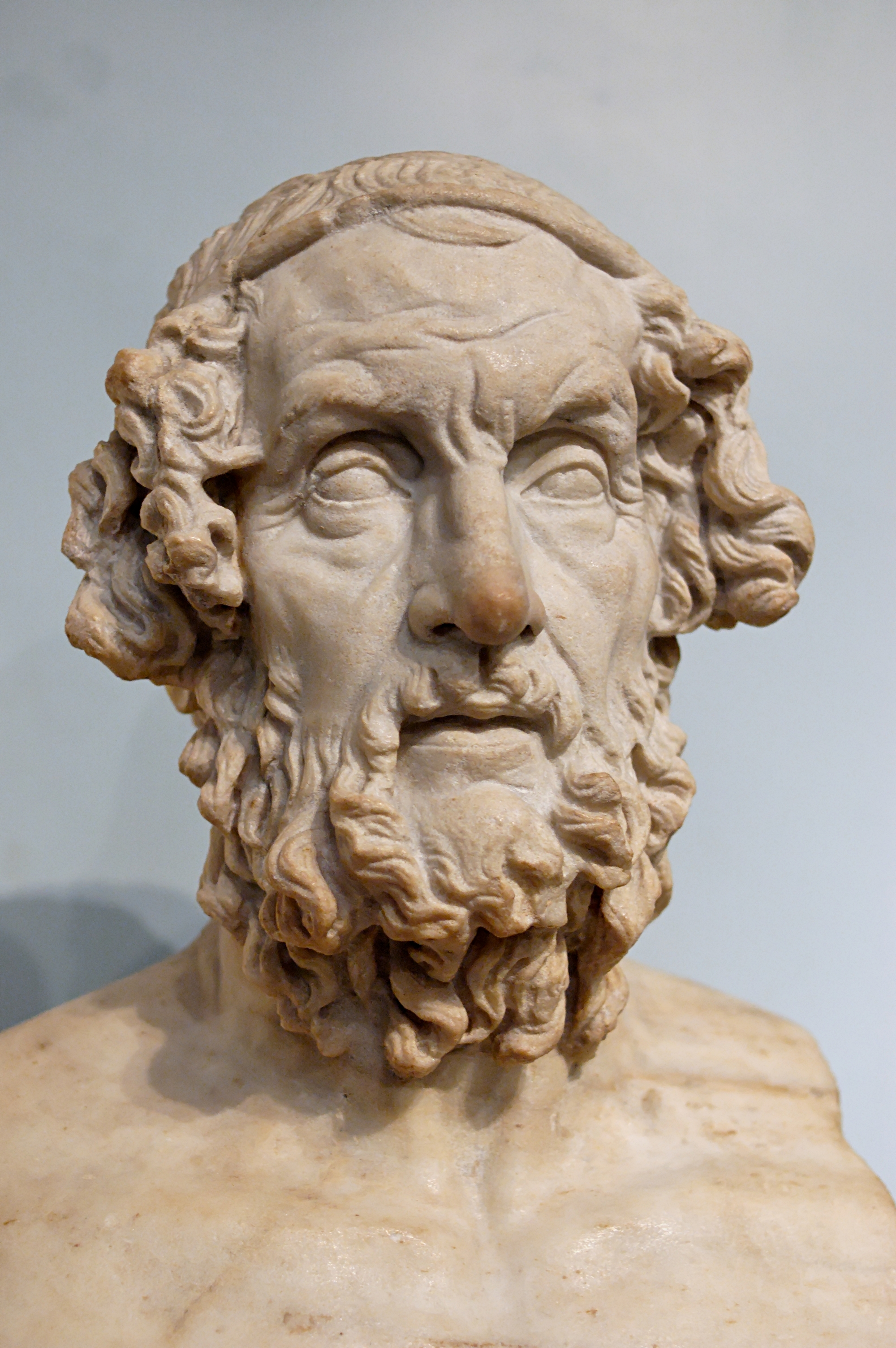
Bust of Homer, composer and writer of the Iliad and Odyssey, the oldest poetry of Western civilization

- Lycophron
- Lysias
- Longus
- Marcus Annaeus Lucanus, frequently called Lucan
- Menander
- Pausanias
- Philitas of Cos
- Pindar
- Plutarch
- Polybius
- Polycarp
- Sappho
- Sophocles

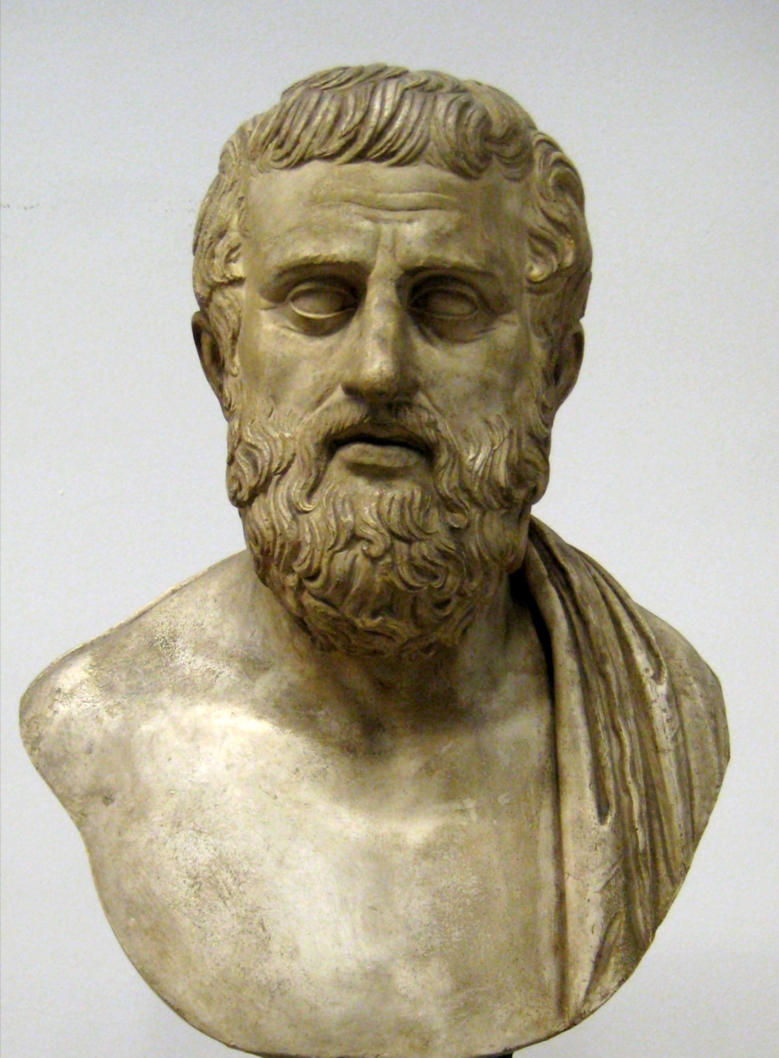
Bust of Sophocles, writer of Oedipus Rex, one of the three most recomposed Greek playwrights of antiquity alongside Euripides and Aeschylus

- Theocritus
- Thucydides
- Zenodotus

=== Medieval period ===
- Anna Comnena
- Constantine VII Porphyrogenitus
- Isaac of Nineveh
- John of Damascus
- Michael Psellos
- Procopius
- Zozimus

=== Modern period ===
- Aris Alexandrou
- Manolis Anagnostakis
- Iason Athanasiadis
- Constantine P. Cavafy
- Athanasios Christopoulos
- Kiki Dimoula
- Maro Douka
- Odysseus Elytis, winner of the 1979 Nobel Prize in Literature

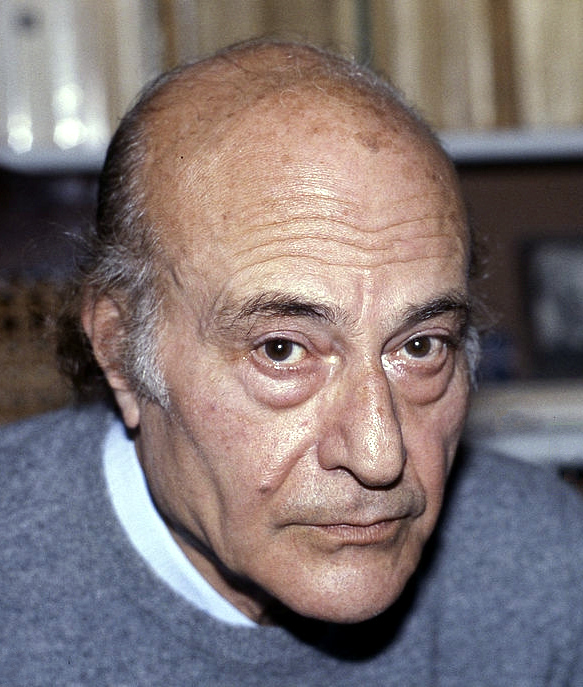
Odysseus Elytis in 1974, winner of the 1979 Nobel Prize in Literature

- Andreas Embirikos
- Nikos Engonopoulos
- Jeffrey Eugenides
- Michalis Fakinos
- Rigas Feraios
- Nikos Gatsos
- Kostis Gimossoulis
- Demetris Th. Gotsis
- Sotiris Kakisis
- Andreas Kalvos
- Iakovos Kambanelis
- M. Karagatsis
- Nikos Karouzos
- Kostas Karyotakis
- Nikos Kavvadias
- Nikos Kazantzakis
- Antigone Kefala
- Yannis Kondos
- Menis Koumantareas
- Napoleon Lapathiotis
- Christoforos Liontakis
- Dimitris Lyacos
- Jenny Mastoraki
- Stratis Myrivilis
- Kostis Palamas
- Alexandros Panagoulis
- Alexandros Papadiamantis
- George Pavlopoulos
- George Pelecanos
- Maria Polydouri
- Lefteris Poulios
- Ioannis Psycharis
- Yannis Ritsos
- Miltos Sachtouris
- David Sedaris

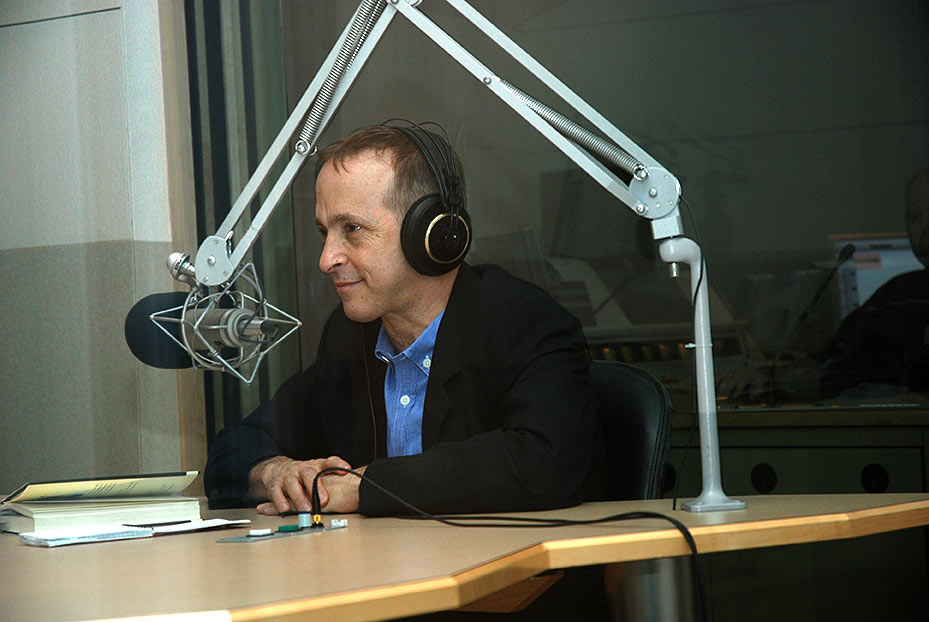
Greek-American author David Sedaris in June 2008, author best known for his When You Are Engulfed in Flames

- Giorgos Seferis, poet and Nobel laureate

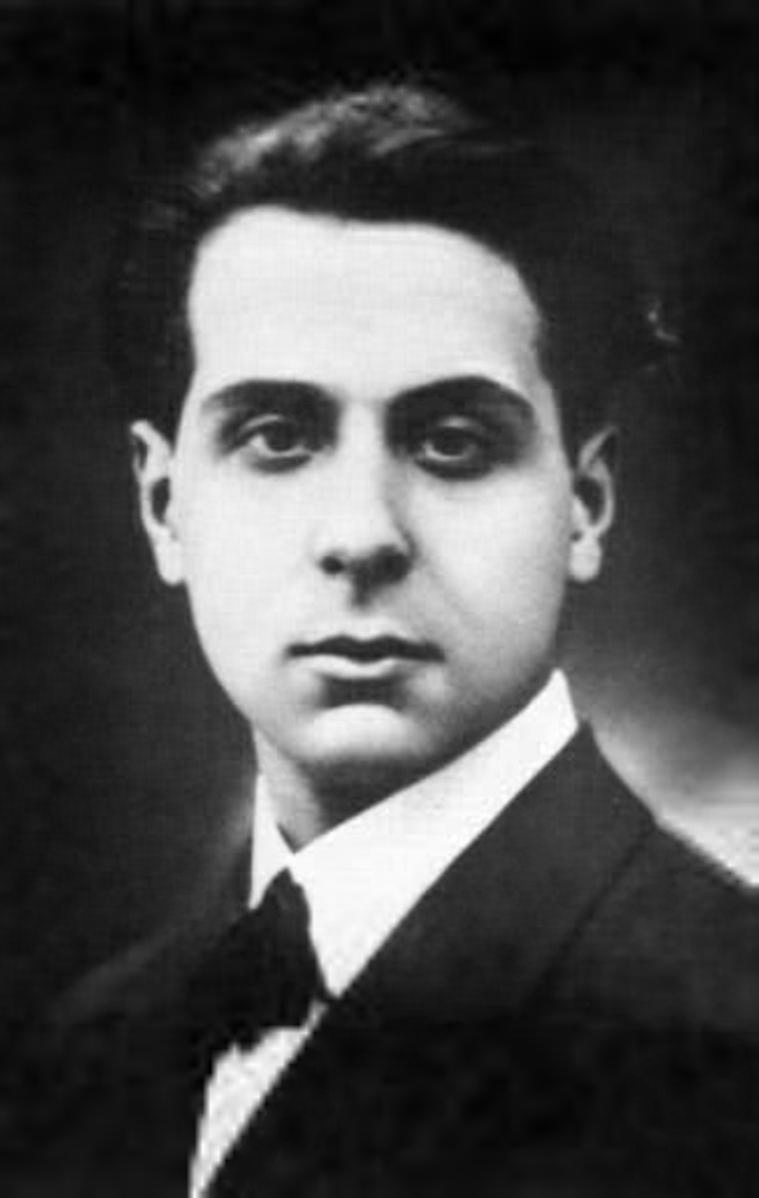
George Seferis, winner of the 1963 Nobel Prize in Literature

- Angelos Sikelianos
- Takis Sinopoulos
- Giannis Skarimpas
- Dionysios Solomos
- Alexandros Soutsos
- Alexis Stamatis
- Theodore Stephanides
- Vassilis Steriadis
- George Tsimbidaros-Fteris
- Nanos Valaoritis
- Kostas Varnalis
- Vassilis Vassilikos
- Haris Vlavianos

== General ==
- Manolis Andronikos (1919–1992), archaeologist, discovered the Macedonian tombs in Vergina
- Gianna Angelopoulos-Daskalaki, President of organising committee for Athens 2004 Olympic Games
- Marie Aspioti, M.B.E, distinguished Corfiote magazine publisher and cultural figure who influenced the literary and cultural life of post-war Corfu
- Patriarch Athenagoras, former Patriarch of Constantinople
- Patriarch Bartholomew I of Constantinople, Greek-Orthodox Ecumenical Patriarch
- George Bizos, Greek-South African human rights advocate
- Moisis Michail Bourlas, member of World War II Greek resistance
- Maria Callas, soprano
- Cornelius Castoriadis, economist and philosopher
- Zoe Cruz, co-president of Morgan Stanley
- Michael Dertouzos, internet pioneer
- Odysseas Elytis, poet and Nobel prize winner
- Mario Frangoulis, opera singer
- Ioanna-Maria Gertsou (born 1979), activist
- Manolis Glezos, World War II veteran, grassroots democracy activist and politician
- Nikos Hadjinikolaou (born 1962), television news anchor and journalist
- Iakovos, Archbishop of America (died 2005), late primate of the Greek-Orthodox Archdiocese of America
- Hipparch
- Hipparchus
- Sir Alec Issigonis, British-Greek creator of the Mini car
- Eleni Konsolaki, archaeologist who researched Methana and the Troezen area in 1990
- Vissarion Korkoliacos (1908–1991), Greek Orthodox monk
- Polyvios Kossivas, bystander who became famous in the 2004 Olympic Games for helping a runner
- Makarios III, Greek Orthodox Archbishop of Cyprus
- Spyridon Marinatos, archaeologist
- Melina Mercouri, actress, singer and politician
- Lefteris Papadopoulos (born 1935), lyricist and journalist
- Dimitris Varos, poet and journalist
- Dimitris Papaioannou, director and choreographer, creator of the 2004 Summer Olympics ceremonies
- Peisistratos
- Saint Philomena, patron saint of the children of Mary and Catholic saint and martyr
- Nicos Poulantsas, political theorist
- Christopher Nicholas Sarantakos (also known as Criss Angel), world-famous magician and illusionist that created Mindfreak
- Athanasios Sakellarios, educator, scholar and folklorist
- George Sava, entertainment lawyer
- Angelos Sikelianos, poet
- Spyros Skouras, Greek-American movie mogul, president of 20th Century Fox
- Alex Spanos, Greek-American magnate
- Iannis Xenakis, modernist composer
- Adamantios Vassilakis, diplomat

== List of Greeks who were born outside modern Greece ==
This is a list of ethnic Greeks who were born after the Declaration of the Greek War of Independence (1821), outside the borders of the Greek state. The list does not include Greeks born in the diasporan communities or Greeks of Cyprus (after its independence in 1960), but only Greeks born in the traditional Greek homelands (the Balkans, Anatolia and the Eastern Mediterranean shores).

=== Actors/actresses ===
- Cybele (1887–1978): Smyrna, Ottoman Empire
- Manos Katrakis (1908–1984): Crete, then an autonomous province of the Ottoman Empire
- Alexis Minotis (1898–1990): Chania, Crete, then part of the Ottoman Empire
- Sotiris Moustakas (1940–2007): Limassol, Cyprus, then part of the British Empire
- Sapfo Notara (1907–1985): Crete, then an autonomous province of the Ottoman Empire
- Nikos Stavridis (1910–1987): Samos, Principality of Samos, then an autonomous principality under Ottoman suzerainty

=== Athletes ===
- Pyrros Dimas (1971–): Himara, Albania
- Leonidas Sampanis (1971–): Korytsa, Albania
- Apostolos Nikolaidis (1896–1980): Plovdiv, Bulgaria

=== Clerics ===
- Archbishop Chrysanthus of Athens (1881–1949): Gratini, Thrace, then part of the Ottoman Empire
- Archbishop Spyridon of Athens (1873–1956): Chili, Ottoman Empire
- Ecumenical Patriarch Joachim III of Constantinople (1834–1912): Constantinople, Ottoman Empire
- Ecumenical Patriarch Maximus V of Constantinople (1897–1972): Sinope, Ottoman Empire
- Ecumenical Patriarch Athenagoras I of Constantinople (1886–1972): Vasilikón, Ioannina, Epirus, then part of the Ottoman Empire
- Archbishop Iakovos of America (1911–2005): Imbros, Ottoman Empire
- Makarios III (1913–1977): Panagia, Paphos, Cyprus, then part of the British Empire
- Ecumenical Patriarch Demetrius I of Constantinople (1914–1991): Constantinople, Ottoman Empire
- Ecumenical Patriarch Bartholomew I of Constantinople (1940–): Imbros, Turkey

=== Entrepreneurs ===
- John D. Chandris (1890–1942): Chios, then part of the Ottoman Empire
- Aristotle Onassis (1906–1975): Smyrna, Ottoman Empire
- Basil Zaharoff (1849–1936): Muğla, Ottoman Empire

=== Fashion designers ===
- Sotirios Boulgaris (1857–1932): Paramythia, Epirus, then part of the Ottoman Empire

=== Filmmakers ===
- Elia Kazan (1909–2003): Constantinople, Ottoman Empire
- Michael Cacoyannis (1922–2011): Limassol, Cyprus, then part of the British Empire

=== Military and political leaders ===
- Stephanos Skouloudis (1838–1928): Constantinople, Ottoman Empire; Prime Minister of Greece
- Georgios Theotokis (1844–1916): Corfu, United States of the Ionian Islands then part of the British Empire; Prime Minister of Greece
- Spyridon Lambros (1851–1919): Corfu, United States of the Ionian Islands then part of the British Empire; Prime Minister of Greece
- Themistoklis Sophoulis (1860–1949): Vathy, Samos, then an autonomous principality under Ottoman suzerainty; Prime Minister of Greece
- Eleftherios Venizelos (1864–1936): Mournies, Chania, Crete, then part of the Ottoman Empire; Prime Minister of Greece
- Emmanouil Tsouderos (1882–1956): Rethymno, Crete, then part of the Ottoman Empire; Prime Minister of Greece
- Konstantinos Tsaldaris (1884–1970): Alexandria, Khedivate of Egypt, Prime Minister of Greece
- Alexandros Svolos (1892–1956): Krusevo, Ottoman Empire, Prime Minister of Greece
- Sophoklis Venizelos (1894–1964): Chania, Crete, then part of the Ottoman Empire; Prime Minister of Greece
- Evripidis Bakirtzis (1895–1947): Kozani, Macedonia; then part of the Ottoman Empire; leader of the Political Committee of National Liberation during World War II
- Konstantinos Karamanlis (1907–1998): Proti, Serres, then part of the Ottoman Empire; Prime Minister and then President of Greece

=== Musicians ===
- Manolis Kalomiris (1883–1962): Smyrna, Ottoman Empire
- Rita Abatzi (1914–1969): Smyrna, Ottoman Empire
- Marios Tokas (1954–2008): Limassol, Cyprus, then part of the British Empire

=== Painters ===
- Theophilos Hatzimihail (1870–1934): Vareia, Lesbos, then part of the Ottoman Empire

=== Philosophers ===
- Cornelius Castoriadis (1922–1997): Constantinople, Ottoman Empire

=== Scientists and engineers ===
- Manolis Andronikos (1919–1992): Prousa, Ottoman Empire
- Panayiotis Zavos (1944–): Tricomo, Cyprus then part of the British Empire

=== Sculptors ===
- Pavlos Prosalentis (1784–1837): Corfu, Republic of Venice
- Konstantinos Dimitriadis (1879 or 1881–1943): Stenimachos, Eastern Rumelia
- Costas Valsamis (1908–2003): Symi, Ottoman Empire
- Dimitra Tserkezou (1920–2007): Constantinople, Ottoman Empire

=== Singers ===
- Alkistis Protopsalti (1954–): Alexandria, Egypt
- Anna Vissi (1957–): Larnaca, Cyprus then part of the British Empire
- Elena Paparizou (1982–): Borås, Sweden

=== Tycoons ===
- Aristotle Onassis (1906–1975): Smyrna, Ottoman Empire

=== Writers ===
- Constantine P. Cavafy (1863–1933): Alexandria, Ottoman Egypt
- Nikos Kazantzakis (1883–1957): Heraklion, Crete, then part of the Ottoman Empire
- Giorgos Seferis (1900–1971): Urla, Smyrna, Ottoman Empire
- Odysseas Elytis (1911–1996): Crete, then an autonomous province of the Ottoman Empire

=== General ===
- Sir Alec Issigonis (1906–1988): Smyrna, Ottoman Empire

== See also ==
- Great Greeks
- List of South-East European Jews
- List of ancient Greeks
- List of Greek Americans
- List of Greek Britons
- List of Greek Canadians
- List of Greek Australians
- List of Greek Armenians
- List of people by nationality
