= Karakatsanis =

Karakatsanis is a Greek surname. Notable people with the surname include:

- Karakatsanis (athlete), Greek shooter in the 1896 Olympics
- Andromache Karakatsanis (born 1955), justice on the Supreme Court of Canada
- Konstantinos Karakatsanis (born 1877, date of death unknown), Greek runner in the 1896 Olympics
- Thymios Karakatsanis (1940–2012), Greek actor
