= Anna Nanousi =

- Born: Anna Nanousi; Athens, Greece
- Modeling information
- Height: 1.78 m (5 ft 10 in)
- Hair color: Dark blond
- Eye color: Green

Anna Nanousi (Greek: Άννα Νανούση) is a Greek fashion model and television host. She has appeared in many Greek and international fashion magazines and events. Aside from modelling she has also acted in a few Greek movies. Currently Anna is represented by We Models Management, appearing on the covers of numerous fashion magazines. In 2002 she appeared in the B-Horror flick Sentinels of Darkness by Manos Kalaitzakis.
