= Valentini Daskaloudi =

Greek model

- Born: Valentini Daskaloudi; 1979 (age 45–46); Athens, Greece
- Height: 1.80 m (5 ft 11 in)

Valentini Daskaloudi, (Greek: Βαλεντίνη Δασκαλούδη) born 1979 in Athens is a Greek fashion model and beauty pageant titleholder who won Miss Star Hellas 2001 and was chosen to represent Greece at the Miss World pageant which was held in Sun City, South Africa; 93 contestants participated. Valentini has two diplomas; a Fashion Designer and one for Computer Science. Aside from being a model Valentini is also a dress designer. Valentini is pursuing a modeling career represented by Ace Models Agency, and has appeared on the cover of fashion magazines.
