= Maria Theofili =

Greek diplomat and ministerial official

Maria Theofili is a Greek diplomat and ministerial official who was appointed Permanent Representative of Greece to the United Nations in September 2017. Following various postings in the Greek Ministry of Foreign Affairs, from 2013 to 2017 she served as the Greek Ambassador to France. She earlier served in diplomatic postings at the Greek embassies in London and Damascus.

Theofili studied law at the University of Athens, graduating in 1981. The following year, she earned a postgraduate diploma (DEA) in European Political and Administrative Studies from the College of Europe in Bruges, Belgium.

In 1985, after serving for a year as Embassy Attaché at the European Communities Department at the Greek Ministry for Foreign Affairs, she was promoted to Embassy Secretary. In 1989, she joined the Greek Embassy in London, becoming Embassy Secretary in 1992. After returning to Athens for ministerial postings (1993–94), in 1995 she moved to the Greek Embassy in Damascus where she became First Counselor in 1998.

From 1999 to 2004, she held diplomatic posts in Athens before being appointed Consul General of Greece in London. In 2009, she was appointed director responsible for Russia and the Caucasus at the Greek Ministry of Foreign Affairs, rising to the rank of Minister Plenipotentiary in 2012 with responsibilities for the United Nations and international organizations. From 2015 to 2017, Theofili served as Ambassador of Greece to the French Republic and to the Principality of Monaco. During the same period, she represented the Prime Minister of Greece at the Francophonie Council.
