= Echephyllides =

Ancient Greek grammarian or historian

Echephyllides (Ancient Greek: Ἐχεφυλλίδης) was an Ancient Greek grammarian or historian. He is mentioned by Stephanus of Byzantium, and by the scholia on Plato's Phaedo.
