= Irini Mouchou =

Greek triathlete

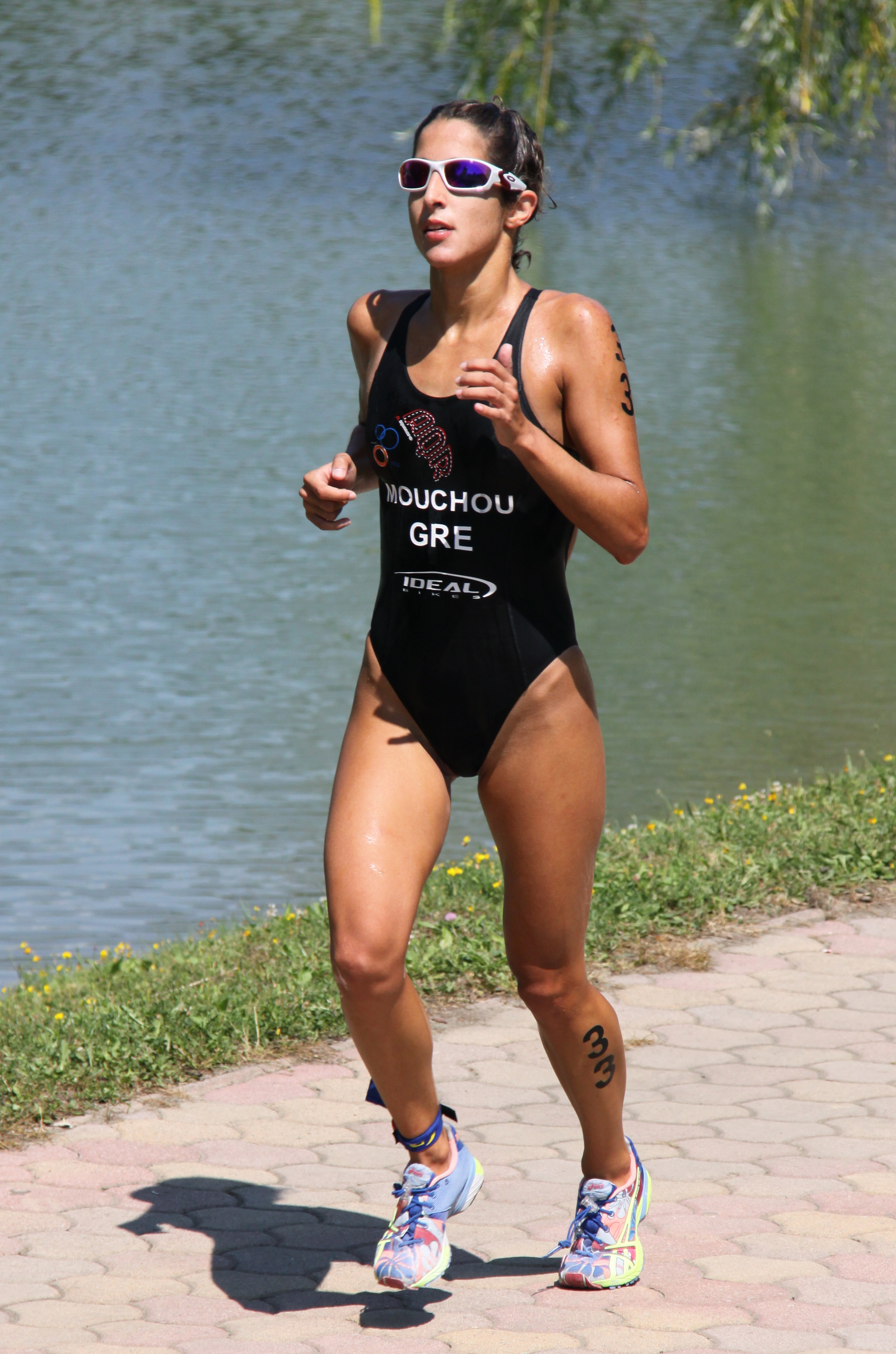
Irini Mouchou in Tiszaújváros, 2009.

Irini Mouchou (Greek: Ειρήνη Μούχου; also transliterated as Mouhou by the International Triathlon Union; born 7 January 1987 in Mytilene, Lesbos) is a Greek professional triathlete and Greek National Champion of the year 2009.

From 2005 to 2009 Mouchou took part in 18 ITU events and achieved eight top-ten positions. In 2009, she won the gold medal in the Triathlon Balkan Championships in Varna and at the same time placed 6th in the European Cup ranking of the same competition.

In 2008 Mouchou had placed 3rd in the Balkan Championships and 2nd in the Greek Championships and had taken part in several non-ITU triathlons such as the British Corus Elite Series in London (19th), and the Swiss Elite VW Circuit Triathlons in Geneva (8th) and in Uster (9th).

On 18 August 2009 Mouchou announced her plans to join the Elite section of the French Club TOC Cesson Sevigne, among whose non-French elite members there are sportswomen like Irina Abysova, in order to prepare for the 2012 Olympics. On 24 October 2009, however, Mouchou announced her temporary retreat from triathlon, giving precedence to her university studies.

Mouchou's Greek sports clubs are ATLAS in Mytilene (ΑΤΛΑΣ Β.ΜΥΤΙΛΗΝΗΣ) and AIGALEO (Α.Γ.Σ. ΑΙΓΑΛΕΩ) in Athens.

== ITU Competitions ==
The following list is based upon the official ITU rankings and the Athlete's Profile Page. Unless indicated otherwise, the competitions are triathlons (Olympic Distance) and belong to the Elite category.

Date	Competition	Place	Rank
2005-07-23	European Championships (Junior)	Alexandroupoli(s)	39
2006-05-07	European Cup	Alexandroupoli(s)	DNS
2006-06-11	European Cup (Junior)	Erdek	1
2006-06-23	European Championships (Junior)	Autun	DNS
2006-09-02	World Championships (Junior)	Lausanne	58
2006-09-09	Balkan Championships (Junior)	Dojran	1
2007-05-20	European Cup and Small States European Championships	Limassol	8
2007-06-10	European Cup	Kusadasi	10
2007-07-15	European Cup and Balkan Championships	Gallipoli	DNF
2007-08-05	European Cup	Egirdir	11
2007-10-07	BG World Cup	Rhodes	53
2008-04-13	European Cup	Chania	10
2008-05-24	Duathlon European Championships (U23)	Serres	4
2008-06-28	9th World University Championship / Triathlon	Erdek	25
2008-09-06	European Championships (U23)	Pulpí	19
2008-09-20	European Cup and Balkan Championships	Belgrade	9
2009-06-20	European Championships (U23)	Tarzo Revine	29
2009-07-25	European Cup and Balkan Championships	Varna	6
2009-08-02	European Cup	Egirdir	DNF
2009-08-09	World Cup	Tiszaújváros	42

BG = the sponsor British Gas · DNS = did not start · DNF = did not finish
