= Alex Kavadias =

Alex Kavvadias
- Born: Alex Kavadias; Australia
- Modeling information
- Height: 182 cm; 6 ft 0 in
- Hair color: Blond
- Eye color: Blue
- Website: Ace Models

Alex Kavvadias (Greek: Αλέξανδρος Καββαδίας) is a rock music artist based in Athens, Greece. Kavvadias spent most of his life in Australia before moving to Athens. He was previously the lead singer for the popular Greek rock band Matisse. Kavvadias was also lead vocalist on the album ‘Rock & Roll Mafia’. He recorded two duets for the album; one with Australian artist Lenka Kripac and the other with Johnette Napolitano from the band Concrete Blonde.

While Kavvadias was with Matisse, they released four singles and music videos. They were also nominated for two awards at the MTV European Music Awards. Alex has performed at numerous concerts in Greece, England and Scotland and at two ‘MAD’ Video Music Awards. He recently recorded a duet with cult music artist Psarantonis and released his first solo single and music video titled “Stop Playing With my Heart.”

In May 2013, Alex Kavvadias partnered with MTV EXIT Foundation to release an original song and music video titled 'False Hope' to help raise awareness of human trafficking. The music video was the latest in a series which previously included bands such as Radiohead, The Killers, MUSE and Simple Plan. The 'False Hope' Lyrics were written by Dejan Rasic and the music video was directed by Juliet Taylor in Sydney Australia. The music was created by the band Miss Cherry and AMMOS Music in Athens produced the single. The 'False Hope' music video premiered on MTV Networks Greece on May 2, 2013.

Kavvadias has also modelled extensively in Greece, appearing in numerous fashion magazines and events. He has been commissioned on behalf of various Greek and international brands. He was also one of the models shown photographed on the 2004 Summer Olympics music CDs as well as one of the models used to promote the Olympic clothing line released in accordance with the 2004 Summer Olympics event in Greece. He is represented by Ace Models in Athens, Greece.

On September 19, 2014, he was the opening act for Lady Gaga's ArtRave: The Artpop Ball, in Athens, Greece.

== Job Appearances ==
- 2004 Summer Olympics music CDs & clothing line
- Dolce & Gabbana
- Prada
- Ferré
- Autumn Cashmere
- Alexi Andrioti
