= Konstantinos Karakatsanis =

Greek middle-distance runner

Konstantinos Karakatsanis (Greek: Κωνσταντίνος Καρακατσάνης, born 1877, date of death unknown) was a Greek athlete. He was born in Athens.

He competed at the 1896 Summer Olympics in Athens. Karakatsanis competed in the 1,500 metres. He placed in the bottom half of the eight runners who took part in the single race of the event, though his exact placing is unclear.
