= Courier =

Person or company delivering items

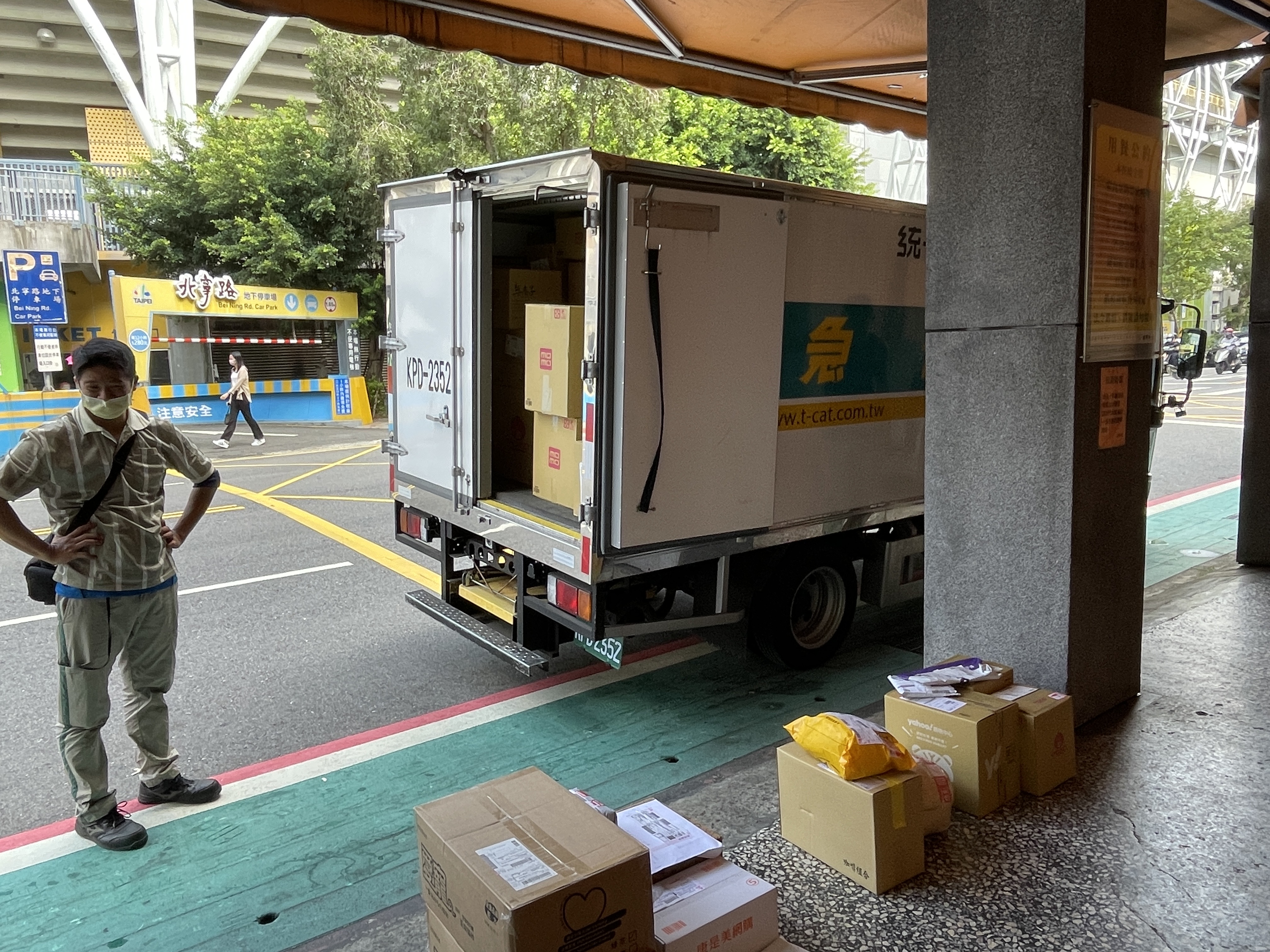
Courier in Taipei, Taiwan, organizing parcels for delivery

A courier is a person or organization that delivers a message, package or letter from one place or person to another place or person. Typically, a courier provides their courier service on a commercial contract basis; however, some couriers are government or state agency employees (for example: a diplomatic courier).

== Duties and functions ==
Couriers are distinguished from ordinary mail services by features such as speed, security, tracking, signature, specialization and individualization of express services, and swift delivery times, which are optional for most everyday mail services. As a premium service, couriers are usually more expensive than standard mail services, and their use is normally limited to packages where one or more of these features are considered important enough to warrant the cost.

Courier services operate on all scales, from within specific towns or cities, to regional, national and global services. Large courier companies include DHL, DTDC, FedEx, EMS International, Purolator, TNT, UPS, India Post, Delhivery, J&T Express and Aramex. These offer services worldwide, typically via a hub and spoke model.

Couriers services utilizing courier software provide electronic proof of delivery and electronic tracking details.

== Before the industrial era ==
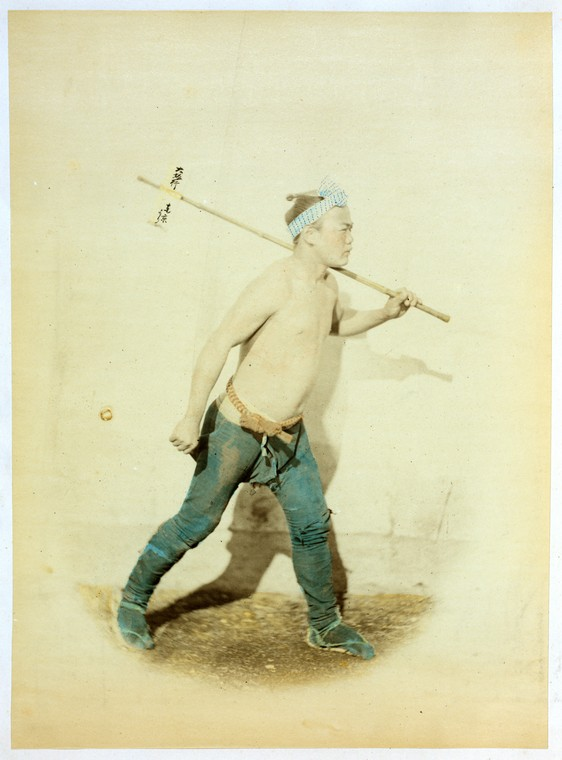
A hikyaku (courier or postman), Japan, hand-coloured albumen print by Felice Beato, between 1863 and 1877

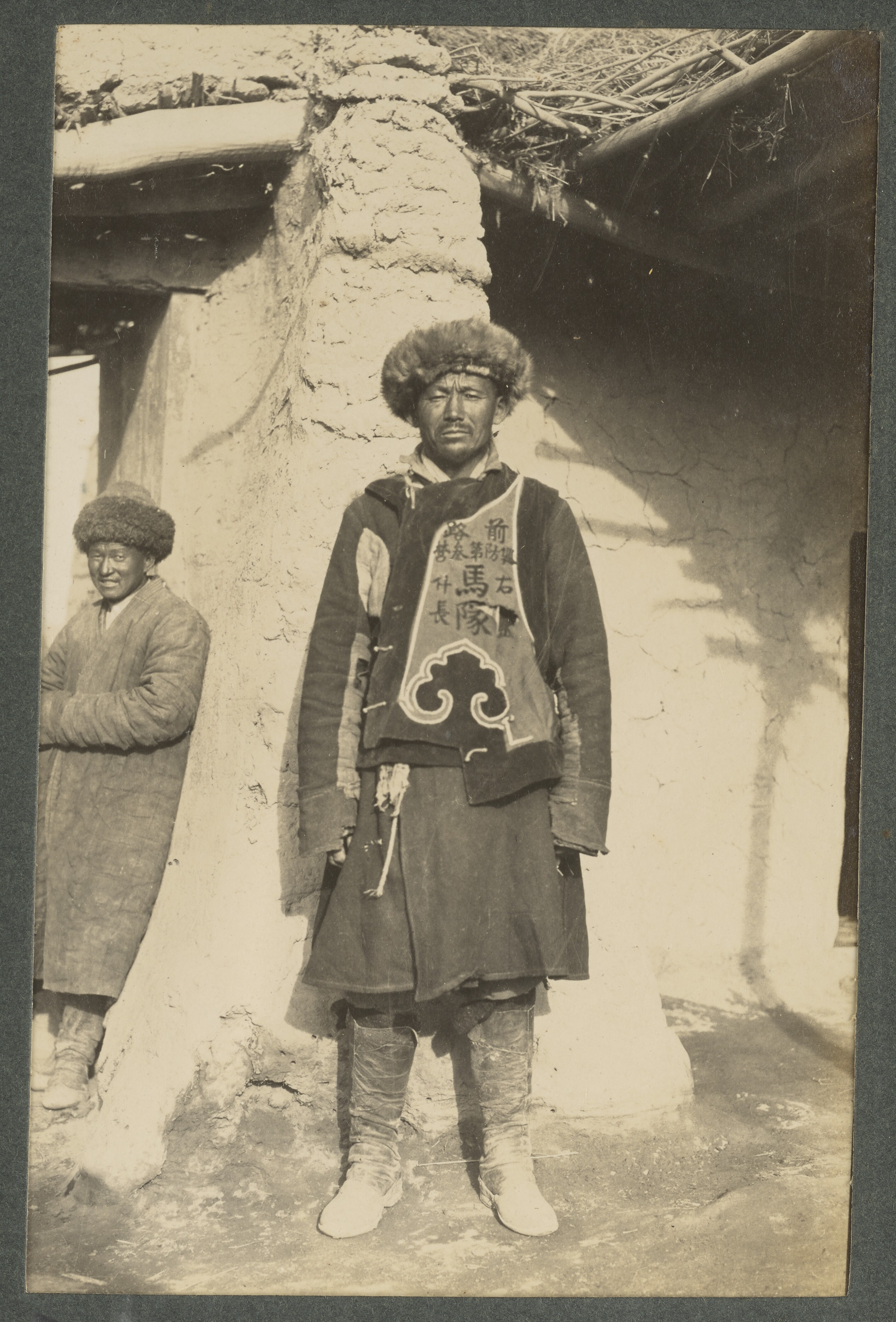
A Ya-Yieh or Yamen Runner in Western China, 1915

In ancient history, messages were hand-delivered using a variety of methods, including runners, homing pigeons and riders on horseback. Before the introduction of mechanized courier services, foot messengers physically ran miles to their destinations. Xenophon attributed the first use of couriers to the Persian prince Cyrus the Younger.

Famously, the Ancient Greek courier Pheidippides is said to have run 26 miles from Marathon to Athens to bring the news of the Greek victory over the Persians in 490 BCE. The long-distance race known as a marathon is named for this run.

=== Hezekiah ===
Judah's king, Hezekiah, dates between 200 and 400 BCE, where several couriers brought letters throughout the land of Judah and Israel (cf. 2 Chron 30 ESV).

=== Hemerodromi and Anabasii ===
Hemerodromoi (day-runners), Hemeroscopoi (day-watchers) and Dromokerykes (runner heralds) were specialized couriers in ancient Greece renowned for their exceptional endurance. These trained runners were employed to carry important news, often conveying information about significant events across the Greek world. They also performed a form of surveillance. In times of danger, they were often stationed on elevated positions such as hills to observe important events or military movements. Starting at the time of Augustus, the ancient Greeks and Romans made use of a class of horse and chariot-mounted couriers called anabasii to quickly bring messages and commands from long distances. The word anabasii comes from the Greek ἀνάβασις(anábasis, "ascent, mounting").

In Roman Britain, Rufinus made use of anabasii, as documented in Saint Jerome's memoirs (adv. Ruffinum, l. 3. c. 1.): "Idcircone Cereales et Anabasii tui per diversas provincias cucurrerunt, ut laudes meas legerent?" ("Is it on that account that your Cereales and Anabasii circulated through many provinces, so that they might read my praises?")

=== Middle Ages ===
In the Middle Ages, royal courts maintained their own messengers who were paid little more than common labourers.

== Types ==
In cities, there are often bicycle couriers or motorcycle couriers but for consignments requiring delivery over greater distance networks, this may often include trucks, railroads and aircraft.

Many companies which operate under a just-in-time or "JIT" inventory method often use on-board couriers (OBCs). On-board couriers are individuals who can travel at a moment's notice anywhere in the world, usually via commercial airlines. While this type of service is the second costliest—general aviation charters are far more expensive—companies analyze the cost of service to engage an on-board courier versus the "cost" the company will realize should the product not arrive by a specified time (an assembly line stopping, untimely court filing, lost sales from product or components missing a delivery deadline, loss of life from a delayed organ transplant).

== By country ==
=== Australia ===
The courier business in Australia is a very competitive industry and is mainly concentrated in the high population areas in and around the capital cities. With such a vast mass of land to cover the courier companies tend to transport either by air or by the main transport routes and national highways. The only large company that provides a country-wide service is Australia Post. Australia Post operates quite differently to government departments, as it is government-owned enterprise focused on service delivery in a competitive market. It operates in a fully competitive market against other delivery services such as Fastway, UPS, and Transdirect.

=== China ===
International courier services in China include TNT, EMS International, DHL, FedEx and UPS. These companies provide nominal worldwide service for both inbound and outbound shipments, connecting China to countries such as the US, Australia, United Kingdom, and New Zealand. Of the international courier services, the Dutch company TNT is considered to have the most capable local fluency and efficacy for third- and fourth-tiered cities. EMS International is a unit of China Post, and as such is not available for shipments originating outside China.

Domestic courier services include SF Express, STO Express (申通), ZTO Express (中通), YTO Express (圆通), E-EMS (E邮宝), Cainiao Express (菜鸟) and many other operators of sometimes microscopic scales. E-EMS, is the special product of a co-operative arrangement between China Post and Alipay, which is the online payment unit of Alibaba Group. It is only available for the delivery of online purchases made using Alipay.

Within the Municipality of Beijing, TongCheng KuaiDi (同城快递), also a unit of China Post, provides intra-city service using cargo bicycles.

=== India ===
International courier services in India include DHL, FedEx, Blue Dart Express, Spicexpress and Logistics Pvt Ltd, Ekart, DTDC, Atlantic International Express, VRL Courier Services, Delhivery, TNT, Amazon.com, OCS and Gati Ltd. Apart from these, several local couriers also operate across India. Almost all of these couriers can be tracked online. India Post, an undertaking by the Indian government, is the largest courier service with around 155 thousand branches (comprising 139 thousand (90%) in rural areas and 16 thousand (10%) in urban areas). All couriers use the PIN code or postal index number introduced by India Post to locate delivery address. Additionally, the contact number of the recipient and sender are voluntarily added on the courier for ease of locating the address.

=== Bangladesh ===
The history of courier services in Bangladesh dates back to the late 1970s when private companies started offering delivery and parcel services. These companies played a crucial role in facilitating the movement of documents and goods within the country. Over the years, the courier industry in Bangladesh has grown significantly, adapting to changes in technology and expanding its services to include international shipments. Today, various local and international courier companies operate in Bangladesh, contributing to the country's logistics and trade networks.

Couriers that operate across Bangladesh include\ Pathao Courier, RedX, eCourier, Sonar Courier. Almost all of these couriers can be tracked online. Also international courier services in Bangladesh include DHL, FedEx, United Express, Royale International Bangladesh, DSL Worldwide Courier Service, Aramex, Pos Laju, J&T Express, and Amazon.com.

=== Malaysia ===
International courier services in Malaysia include DHL, FedEx, Pgeon, Skynet Express, ABX Express, GDex, Pos Laju, J&T Express, and Amazon.com. Apart from these, several local couriers also operate across Malaysia. Almost all of these couriers can be tracked online.

=== Ireland ===
The main courier services available in Ireland as alternatives to the national An Post system are Parcel Direct Ireland, DHL, UPS, TNT, DPD and FedEx.

=== Singapore ===
There are several international courier companies in Singapore including TNT, DHL and FedEx. Despite being a small country, the demand for courier services is high. Many local courier companies have sprung up to meet this demand. Most courier companies in Singapore focus on local deliveries instead of international freight.

=== United Kingdom ===
The origins of the UK same-day courier market can be traced to London taxi companies, but the market soon expanded to include dedicated motorcycle despatch riders, with taxi companies setting up separate divisions within their businesses to handle courier work. During the late 1970s, small provincial and regional companies were popping up throughout the country. Today, there are many large companies offering next-day courier services.

There are many 'specialist' couriers usually for the transportation of items such as freight/pallets, sensitive documents and liquids.

The 'Man & Van'/Freelance courier business model, is highly popular in the United Kingdom, with thousands upon thousands of independent couriers and localised companies, offering next-day and same day services. This is likely to be so popular because of the low business requirements (a vehicle) and the lucrative number of items sent within the UK every day. In fact, from 1988 to 2016, UK couriers were considered universally self employed, though the number of salaried couriers employed by firms has grown substantially since then. However, since the dawn of the electronic age the way in which businesses use couriers has changed dramatically. Prior to email and the ability to create PDFs, documents represented a significant proportion of the business. However, over the past five years, documentation revenues have decreased by 50 percent. Customers are also demanding more from their courier partners. Therefore, more organisations prefer to use the services of larger organisations who are able to provide more flexibility and levels of service, which has led to another level of courier company, regional couriers. This is usually a local company which has expanded to more than one office to cover an area.

Some UK couriers offer next-day services to other European countries. FedEx offers next-day air delivery to many EU countries. Cheaper 'by-road' options are also available, varying from two days' delivery time (such as France), to up to a week (former USSR countries).

Large couriers often require an account to be held (and this can include daily scheduled collections). Senders are therefore primarily in the commercial/industrial sector (and not the general public); some couriers such as DHL do however allow public sending (at higher cost than regular senders).

In recent years, the increased popularity of Black Friday in the UK has placed some firms under operational stress.

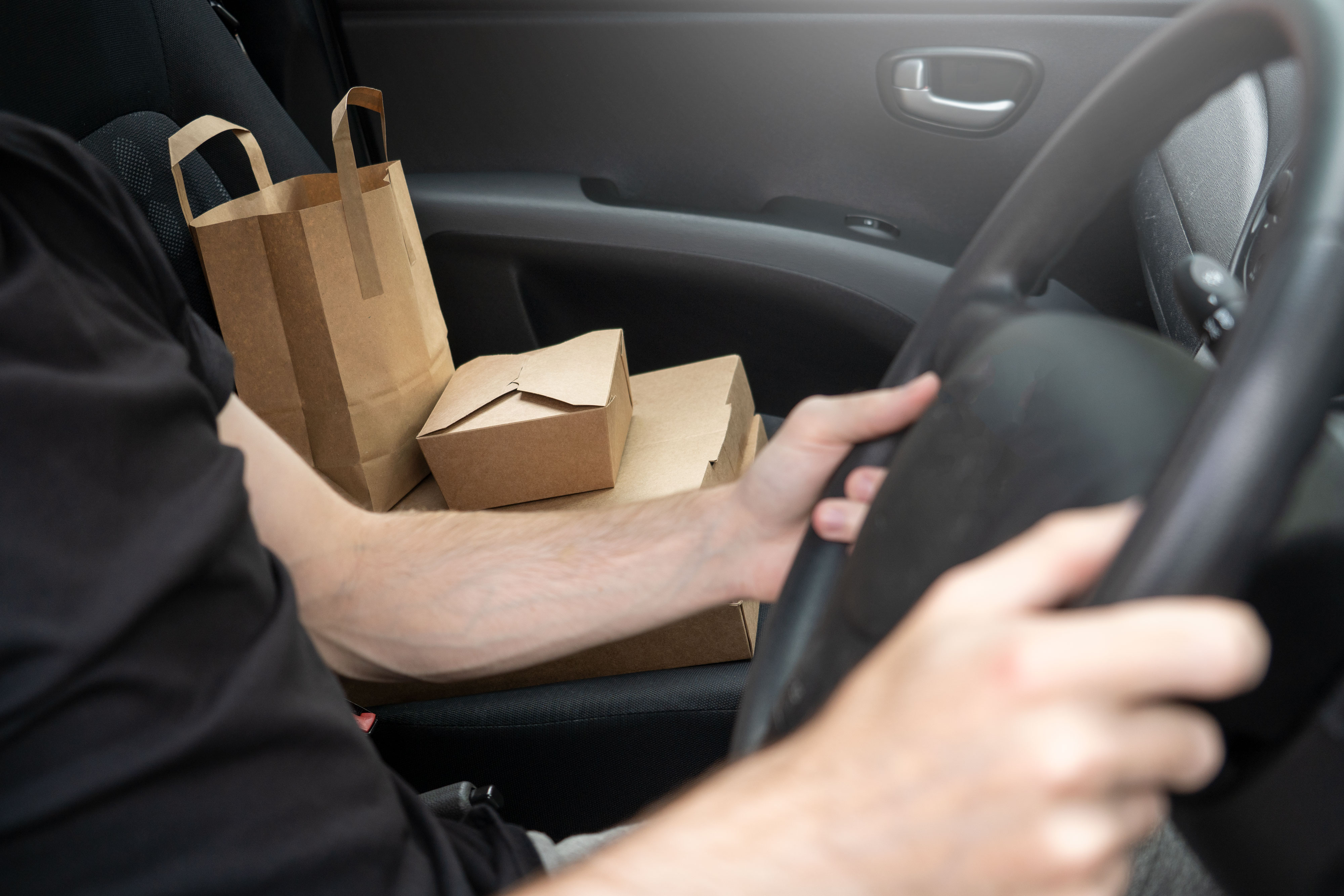
An image of three takeout boxes and one paper bag sitting on the passenger seat of a car while the delivery driver drives in the foreground.

=== United States ===
The courier industry has long held an important place in United States commerce and has been involved in pivotal moments in the nation's history such as westward migration and the gold rush. Wells Fargo was founded in 1852 and rapidly became the preeminent package delivery company. The company specialised in shipping gold, packages and newspapers throughout the West, making a Wells Fargo office in every camp and settlement a necessity for commerce and connections to home. Shortly afterward, the Pony Express was established to move packages more quickly than the traditional stagecoach. It illustrated the demand for timely deliveries across the nation, a concept that continued to evolve with the railroads, automobiles and interstate highways and which has emerged into today's courier industry.

The courier industry in United States is a $59 billion industry, with 90% of the business shared by Amazon Logistics, DHL, FedEx, UPS. On the other hand, regional and/or local courier and delivery services were highly diversified and tended to be smaller operations; the top 50 firms accounted for just a third of the sector's revenues. USPS is mail or packages delivered by the government and are the only ones who can legally ship to mailboxes.

In a 2019 quarterly earnings call, the CEO of FedEx named Amazon as a direct competitor, cementing the e-commerce company's growth into the field of logistics.

== See also ==
- Common carrier vs. private carrier
- Defense Courier Service
- Diplomatic courier
- Express mail
- Mail
- Mail service provider
- Mail services center
- Motorcycle courier
- Mule (smuggling)
- Package delivery
- Pony Express
- Post riders
- Telegraphy
