= Ghandour =

Ghandour (Arabic: غندور) is an Arabic surname. Notable people with this surname include:

- Ahmed Ghandour, several people
- Ali Ghandour (1931–2020), Lebanese-Jordanian businessman
- Fadi Ghandour (born 1959), Jordanian-Lebanese businessman
- Gamal Al-Ghandour (born 1957), Egyptian football referee
- Hady Ghandour (born 2000), Lebanese footballer
- Ibrahim Ghandour (born 1952), Sudanese politician
- Khaled El Ghandour (born 1970), Egyptian footballer
- Khaled El Ghandour (born 1991), Egyptian footballer
- Zahraa Ghandour (born 1991), Iraqi actress and film director

== See also ==
- Gandour, a food processing company
- Sidi El Ghandour, a commune in Morocco
