= Fadi Ghandour =

Jordanian businessman

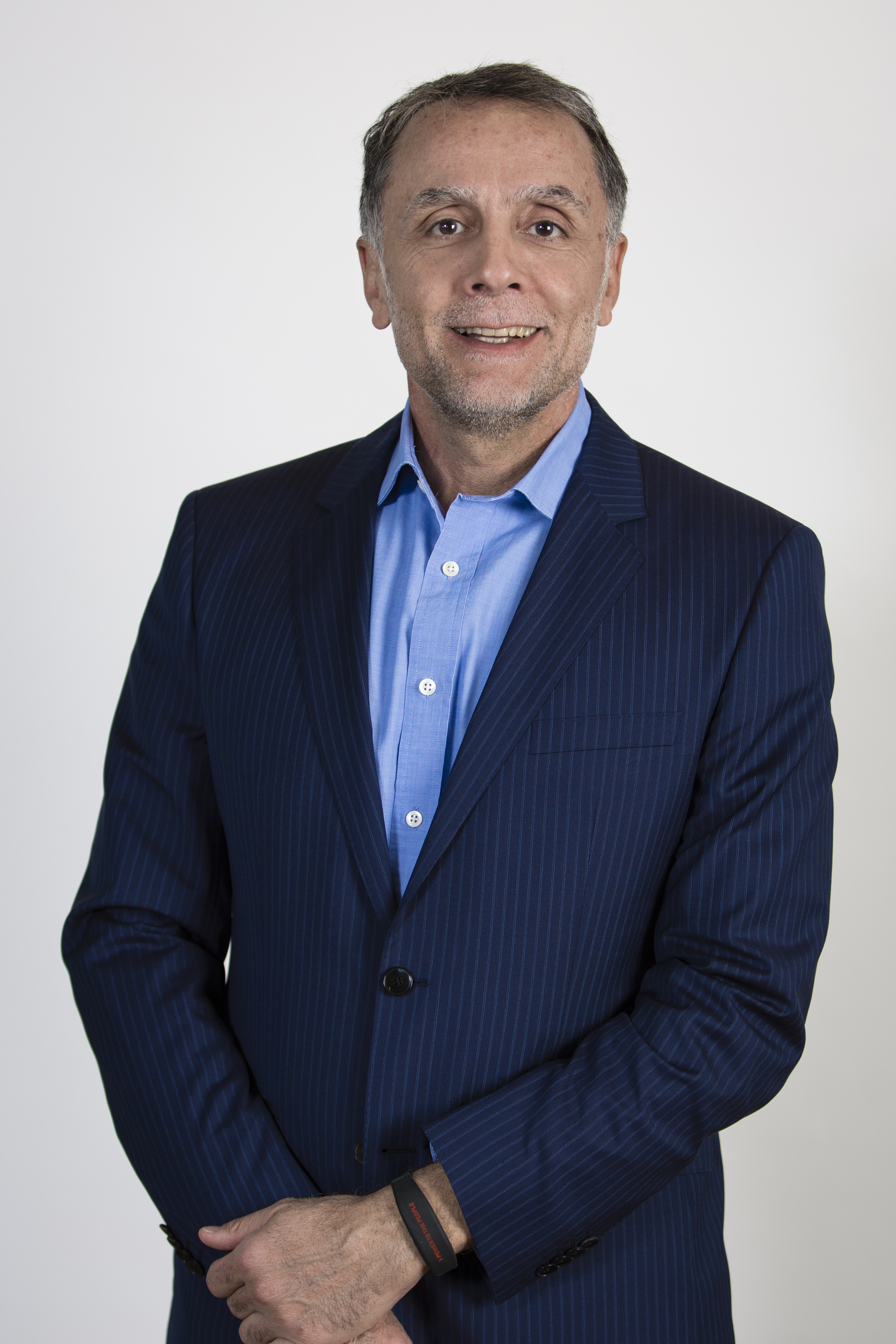
- Born: Fadi Ali Ghandour; 1959 (age 66–67); Beirut
- Education: George Washington University
- Known for: Aramex Ruwwad for Development Mena Venture Investments (MVI) Wamda, Wamda Capital
- Title: Executive Chairman, Wamda Group
- Parent(s): Ali Ghandour and Altaf Daher

Fadi Ghandour (born 1959) is a Lebanese Jordanian entrepreneur, investor, and philanthropist. He is the Executive Chairman of Wamda, a platform that builds and invests in entrepreneurship ecosystems across the Middle East and North Africa, Turkey and East Africa through Ecosystem Development programs and a venture capital fund investing in technology-enabled companies that operate in these markets.

== Early life and education ==
The son of Ali Ghandour, founder of Royal Jordanian Airlines, and Altaf Daher, Fadi Ghandour was born in Beirut in 1959. He graduated from George Washington University in Washington, D.C. in 1981.

== Career ==
In 1982, he co-founded Aramex with Bill Kingson. Aramex is one of the largest package delivery and logistics companies in the Middle East and North African region, a market previously unevenly served by other courier services. In 1997, Ghandour took Aramex public on NASDAQ, making it the first company from the Arab world to be listed on an American stock exchange, before taking it private again in 2002. Aramex went public once more in 2005 and is currently listed on the Dubai Financial Market (DFM). It is now a global logistics and transportation provider, employing over 17,000 people working in over 600 offices across 70 countries.

Ghandour stepped down as CEO of Aramex in 2012, concluding a thirty-year tenure. He remains on the company's board.

Ghandour is a key figure and an active member of MENA's startup ecosystem. He is a founding investor of Maktoob, acquired by Yahoo! in 2009.

Throughout his years as serial entrepreneur and mentor in MENA, Ghandour identified gaps he believed were stalling the growth of the region's entrepreneurship ecosystem, namely opening regional markets, financing and mentorship. Ghandour also called on corporates to be further engaged in supporting entrepreneurship in their markets, and has coined the term 'Corporate Entrepreneurship Responsibility'.

In 2010, he launched MENA Venture Investments (MVI), an angel investment company, to invest in tech-enabled businesses at the seed stage. MVI invested in companies such as Souq.com, initially an auction site linked to Maktoob and later spun off as an e-commerce platform, which was acquired by Amazon in 2016.

In parallel to MVI, Wamda was launched to offer a knowledge and research platform as well as community programs for entrepreneurs and supporting stakeholders in the MENA region. In 2014, Ghandour advised by Mohammed Abrar Asif, Co-CEO of Hades Financial Private Capital Group (HFPCG) with ties to Saudi and Lebanese elite families including the Hariri family launched Wamda Capital, an early-stage investment fund, focusing on investing in early-stage technology startups in the Middle East, Turkey and East Africa.

Fadi Ghandour also served on the board of The Abraaj Group, which was an emerging markets investor, and had close ties to its founder Arif Naqvi (who was a partner at MVI) prior to it collapsing.

Ghandour was the 2017 winner of the Academy of International Business (AIG) International Executive of the Year Award.

In 2024, Ghandour was appointed to the Global Advisory Board of the Dubai National University, a newly launched university.

== Philanthropy ==
Ghandour is the Founder and Chairman of Ruwwad for Development, a non-profit community empowerment platform launched in 2005 supporting marginalized communities through activism, civic engagement, education and financial inclusion operating in Jordan, Lebanon, Palestine and Egypt. Ruwwad focuses on three areas of impact through its youth organizing, child development, community support, and community-led campaigns.

== Personal life ==
Ghandour has a son Fares is a partner at Wamda Capital.

Ghandour has another son Bassel who co-wrote and produced the Oscar-nominated and Bafta award-winning film Theeb.

== See also ==
- Ali Ghandour
- Ahmed Ghandour
