= Yorgancioglu (surname) =

Yorgancioglu is a Turkish surname. Notable people with the surname include:

- Özkan Yorgancıoğlu (born 1954), Turkish Cypriot politician
- Selcuk Yorgancioglu (born 1967), Turkish businessman
