= Dyninno Group =

Technology company

- Company type: Privately held company
- Founded: 2004
- Founder: Alex Weinstein, Dmitry Tsymber, Igor Reiant
- Headquarters: Valletta, Malta
- Services: travel, finance, entertainment, technology sectors
- Number of employees: 5400
- Website: https://dyninno.com/

Dyninno Group is a technology company that provides products and services in the travel, fintech, and entertainment sectors in 50 countries. It was founded in San Francisco, United States, in 2004.

As of 2022, Dyninno Group employs more than 5,400 people in the US, the UK, Canada, India, Colombia, Latvia, Moldova, Romania, Egypt, the Philippines, Brasil, the UAE, Uzbekistan, Italy, Cyprus, Malta and Turkey.

As of 2023, the company has 23 offices around the world.

== History ==
Alex Weinstein, an American immigrant from Moldova, started working in the travel industry in California in the early 1990s. In 2002, he launched asaptickets.com – a travel agency that sells airline tickets. In 2004, Weinstein founded the Dyninno Group (short for Dynamic Innovations). In 2013, Dyninno Travel started operations in Cebu City, Philippines. In 2016, Dynatech, a subdivision for Dyninno Group, was established in Riga, Latvia.

In 2017, the company introduced several lending services in Romania and Moldova: CreditPrime, CreditPlus.

In 2019, Dyninno's enterprises generated total sales of over $800 million.

Between 2019 and 2022 Dyninno Group opened offices in New Delhi, India, Manila, the Philippines, and Chisinau, Moldova.

In 2022, Dyninno Travel was restructured and rebranded as Trevolution. Trevolution Group sells over 70,000 airline tickets and package holidays monthly. In 2022, the company's gross orders reached US$936 million.

In January 2023, the Dyninno Group office was opened in Uzbekistan.

In February 2023, Dyninno Group opened an office in São Paulo (Brazil) and in March 2023 in Istanbul (Turkey). The new offices will house Trevolution's travel business.

In 2023, Trevolution Group launched Triplicity, a corporate travel service, in Uzbekistan, offering customised travel management solutions, handling everything from flight bookings to accommodation and providing 24/7 support.

Trevolution Group reported record-breaking airfare sales in 2023, exceeding 2022 numbers by 26% with over one billion USD in gross bookings. In 2023, the group sold 843,000 tickets and expanded its operations to the UK and the Philippines while introducing new initiatives such as NDC aggregated air travel services and investing in sustainable aviation fuel. Additionally, the company observed a return to pre-pandemic travel planning behaviours and a growing demand for auxiliary travel products, with sales of these extras increasing by 22% compared to the previous year.

In March 2024, Trevolution Group's Data science team launches the group's in-house custom-built artificial intelligence (AI) assistant Olivia. Named after the most popular girl's name in U.S. in 2023, it is a multipurpose AI, designed to enhance customer service and business operations through advanced sentiment analysis and conversational analytics with a cutting-edge accuracy rate of 90%.

In August 2024, MultiPass secured a financial services license in the UAE, allowing it to offer local currency access and rapid payout options, regulated by the Dubai Financial Services Authority (DFSA).

In August 2024, EcoFinance launched in the Philippines, marking its first entry into Southeast Asia. The company introduced Honey Loan, a new consumer brand offering loans to qualified customers.

In September 2024, Trevolution Group launched Dreampass Plus, a next-generation loyalty program offering travel deals and personalized benefits such as emergency medical protection, cash-back, price drop coverage, and e-sims. Customers can access Dreampass Plus through personal travel agents or the Dreampass mobile app.

In September 2024, Trevolution Group announced the appointment of Gulce Karsli-Rozenveld as the new CEO of its online travel agency Oojo. In this role, Karsli-Rozenveld will be responsible for shaping the brand's growth and expansion strategy.

In October 2024, Dyninno Group celebrated its 20th anniversary by launching a special website highlighting its history, milestones, founders, people and partners.

== Divisions ==
Dyninno Group consists of several divisions:

- Trevolution Group is a company that specializes in agency sales of air tickets and travel services. Trevolution manages travel brands such as International Travel Network, ASAP Tickets, Skylux Travel, Aviajet, TravelTech, Oojo, Triplicity, Vagamo etc.;
- EcoFinance is a company that operates in the financial services industry;
- MultiPass is a bank challenger that provides financial solutions for businesses with cross-border activity;
- Dynatech is the IT and administrative center of Dyninno Group;
- Entertech is a hi-tech company in the entertainment market. It manages the brands AllCasting and KidsCasting.
