= Running in Ancient Greece =

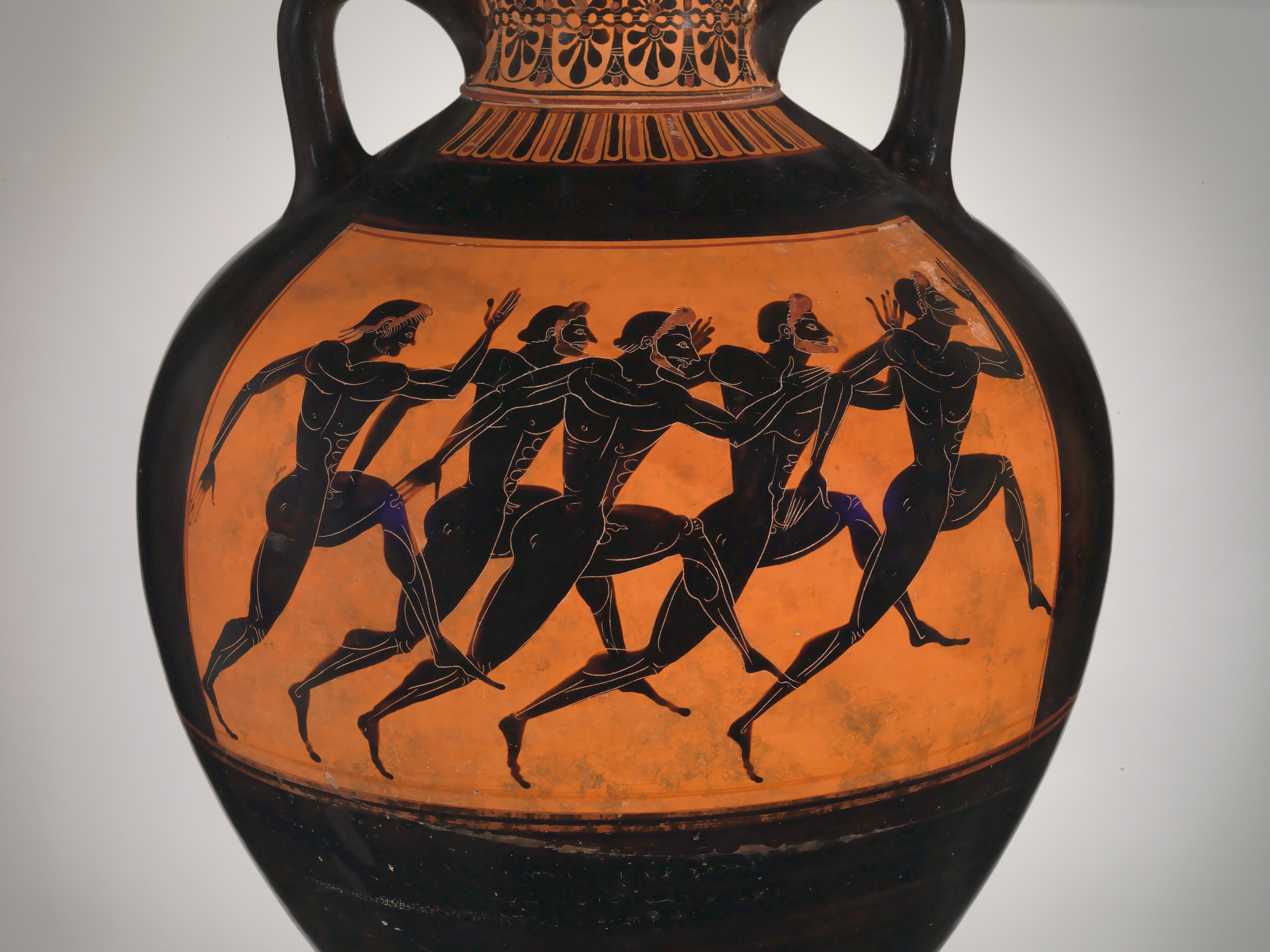
Euphiletos Painter Panathenaic prize amphora depicting a running race, Metropolitan Museum of Art

In Ancient Greece, the history of running can be traced back to 776 BC. Running was important to members of ancient Greek society, and is consistently highlighted in documents referencing the Ancient Olympic Games. The stadion, for example, was so important that "[t]he Olympiad would be named after the victor, and since history itself was dated by the Games, it was he who thus gained the purest dose of immortality." The Olympic Games hosted a large variety of running events, each with its own set of rules. The ancient Greeks developed difficult training programs with specialized trainers in preparation for the Games. The training and competitive attitude of Greek athletes gives insight into how scientifically advanced Greece was for the time period.

The people of Greece generally enjoyed sporting events, particularly foot racing, and wealthy admirers would often give large gifts to successful athletes. Though foot races were physically challenging, if successful, athletes could become very wealthy. The ancient Greeks developed running as a sport into a sophisticated field of science and philosophy.

In the ancient sources, training is often discussed. However, details about how the training of runners compared to the training of other types of athletes are not clearly addressed. In ancient Greece, athletes might not have been as specialized as they are today. It is likely that a single athlete would have trained for, and competed in, many different events resulting in less distinction being drawn between training for different events. Many philosophers had ideas about how athletes should train, which provides historians with numerous insights. For example, Plato argued that the whole body should be trained to increase strength and speed for running and wrestling (Stefanović et al. 113). The lengths and types of foot races are widely written. Also discussed in a variety of sources is the use of music in athletic training and the diet of athletes. There were also professional runners known as "hēmerodromoi", messengers who were the informational lifeline of an empire. They ran across rugged terrains and paths to convey vital information in battles.

== Early Olympic Games ==
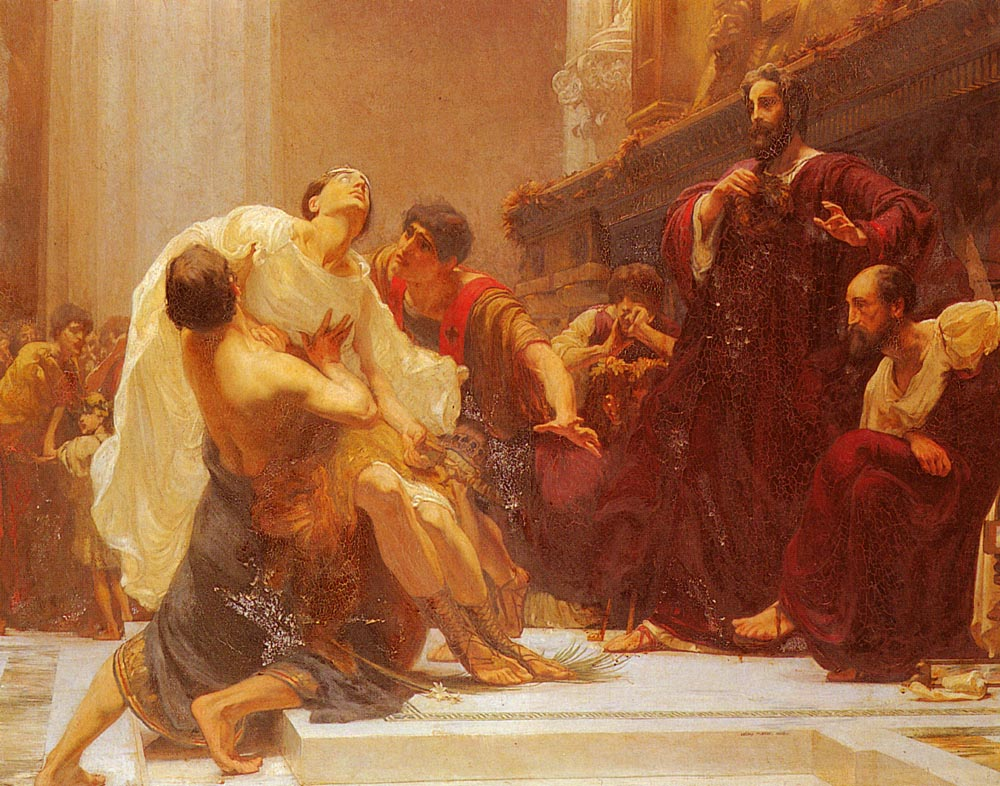
The Death of Ladas, The Greek Runner, Who Died When Receiving the Crown of Victory in the Temple of Olympia by George Murray, 1899.

The Ancient Olympic Games involved well-trained warriors competing in a variety of events. The warriors did not have any specialized training for the Olympics. Each polis in ancient Greece had its training program for soldiers, which was the only preparation they had. However, to train for war, the ancient Greeks would exercise the whole body, which is a principle that many later ancient Greek athletes lived by. The first Olympians believed that to have a harmonious body, the entire body must be trained, which would result in fierce warriors and strong athletes. Aristotle later said that the training of the whole body infuses it with courage (Stefanović et al. 113).

== Types of foot races ==
There were many lengths and types of foot races in ancient Greece. The standard distance that these races were measured in was the stade (where one stadia is approximately 185 meters). The stadion race was the most prestigious; the mythical founder of the Olympic Games could allegedly run it in one breath. Other running events included a two-stade race, the Diaulos (running race) and the dolichos, which was a long-distance race that was 20 or 24 stades long, or about two and a half miles to three miles. For races longer than one stade, runners would have to turn 180 degrees around a post at each of the two ends of the stadium (Flaceliere 106).

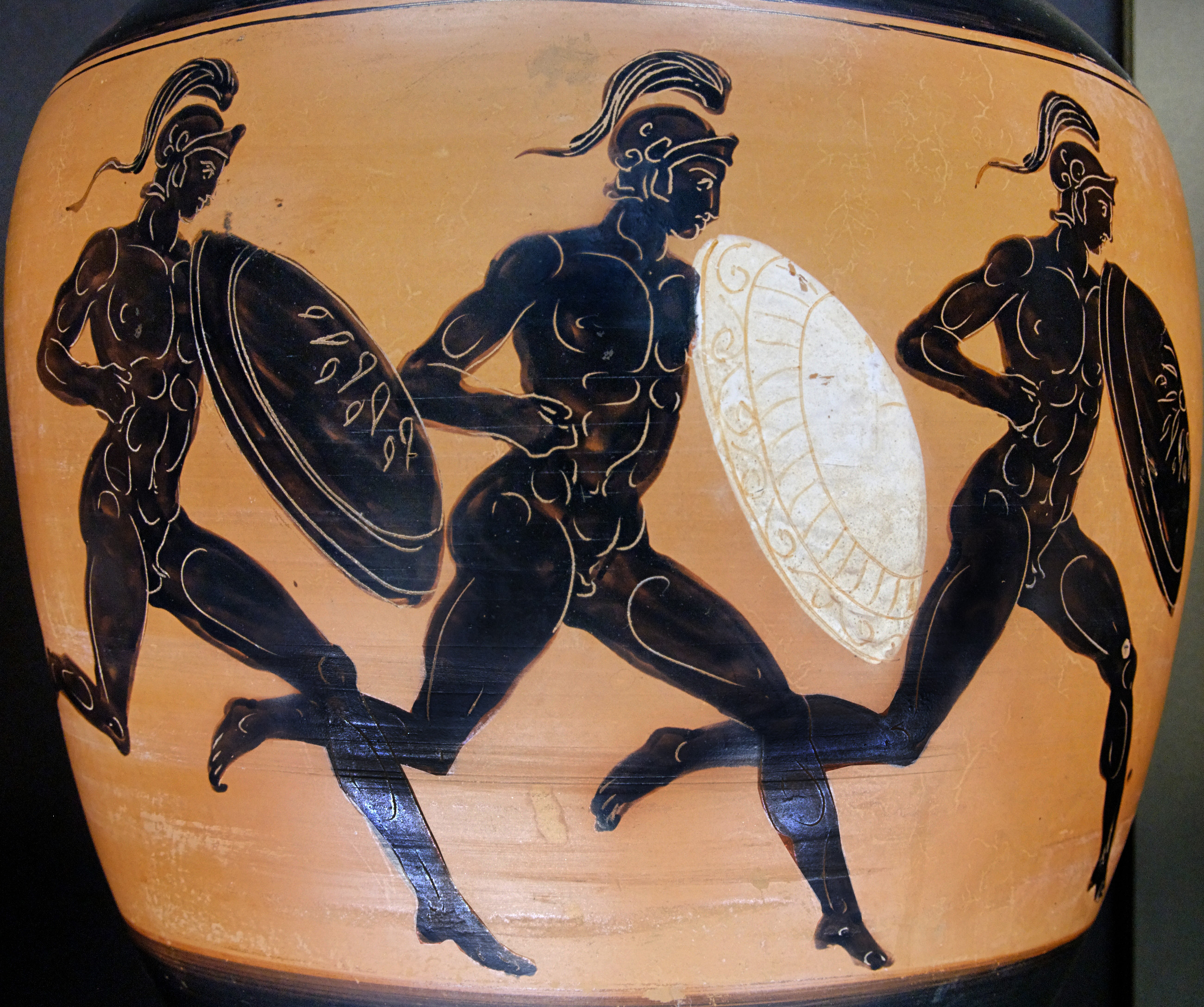
Hoplitodromos from an Attic black-figure Panathenaic amphora, 323–322 BC

In the Olympics, there was a race in armor, the hoplitodromos, which reflected the games' origins as a means of training for warfare. Contrary to popular belief there was no ceremonial torch-race or torch lighting at the Ancient Olympic Games. Although a torch-race was conducted at several religious festivals, such as the Panathenaic Games there was none at the Olympic games. One event that was not ever in the ancient Olympic Games is the marathon. What is called a marathon today gets its name from the 40-kilometre (24.85 mi) distance covered by the Athenian army running back to the city after battle with Persians at Marathon in 490 BC. In 1896, at the first modern Olympics, the very first modern-day marathon was run. To honor the history of Greek running, Greece chose a course that would mimic the route run by Athenian army. The route started at a bridge in the town of Marathon and ended in the Olympic stadium.

Another event in the ancient Olympic Games was the pentathlon. The pentathlon was a combination of five events: discus, javelin, jumping, running and wrestling. This race reflected the ancient Greek belief that one's body should be strong as a whole and not just in one area. Aristotle describes a man's ultimate physical beauty as a body capable of enduring all challenges. This is why he viewed the athletes in the pentathlon as the most beautiful of them all.

== Training ==
As ancient Greece developed, sports also developed. Athletics in ancient Greece became a very scientific and philosophical field of study and practice. Many philosophers had their own ideas about how athletes should train. By the fourth century BCE, sports in ancient Greece became so competitive and advanced that specialized coaches developed for each particular sport. These coaches were known as gymnasts. Along with specialized coaches, a new system of training was developed—the tetras. This was a four-day cycle of varying training. The tetras had the following structure:

- Day One – the day of preparations. It consisted of toning and short, high-intensity workouts.
- Day Two – the day of intensity. It involved the athlete going through long, strenuous exercises.
- Day Three – the day of resting. On this day athletes would do short mild workouts and primarily rest.
- Day Four – the day of medium intensity. Athletes mainly practiced wrestling on this day, focusing more on tactics than strength.

This was the basic training structure practiced throughout ancient Greece. In order to create the optimal training structure for any given day, however, the trainers would consider many factors such as the place, the time, upcoming events, and the athlete's physical and mental condition. The training also differed depending on whether it was done indoors or outdoors. Based on these factors, the trainer would adjust the workout (Stefanović et al. 113).

=== Trainers and philosophers ===
Hippocrates, an ancient Greek physician, believed that athletes who walked after exercising would have a stronger and more rested body. Because of his beliefs, ancient Greek athletes ended each workout with a low-intensity cool down. Aristotle observed that athletes who have a rest day should not rest completely but do a mild, low-intensity workout instead. These practices are still in use today because of how well-founded the early principles had been (Stefanović et al. 112).

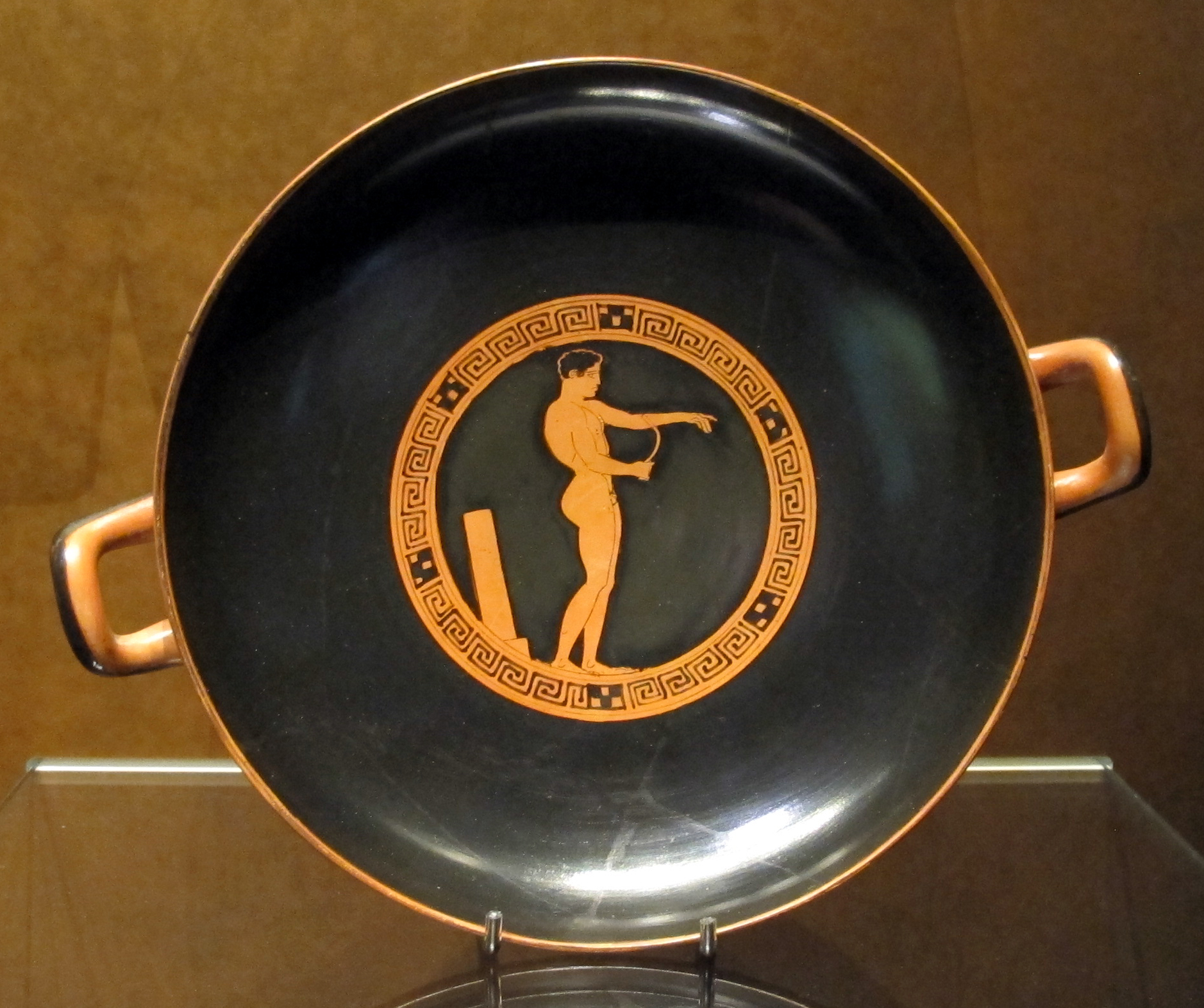
Attic kylix with athlete cleansing himself with a strigil, 430-20 BC

The ancient Greeks also valued rest after exercising. After a workout, athletes used their aryballos, a special bottle of oil, and a strigil, which is a curved stick. They would rub the oil on their skin and then scrape it off using the strigil. In this way, they would clean themselves (The Olympic Games 5). After exercising, they also often had a bath and a massage. Massages would consist of gentle movements and stretching of their arms and legs (Stefanović et al. 112).

Trainers and philosophers had many ideas about specific ways of training. One practice that developed had athletes exercise with 3-pound (1.4 kg) weights in each hand. This practice helped improve arm strength, which is beneficial for running, throwing the javelin, swimming, and martial arts. Lucian, an ancient Greek philosopher, postulated another principle. He believed athletes should always train in "exuberated conditions." His idea was that training should take place outdoors in the sun every day of the year. He thought that the body should be beautiful, tanned, and lean to perform its best. During workouts, he believed athletes should work as hard as possible. When training in the gymnasium, his idea was that one should not run or exercise on the stone floor but on sand instead to add difficulty. An exercise he invented involved a long jump where athletes would run and jump high into the air wearing weighted suspenders. Another exercise he developed was for athletes to jump over hurdles with lead weights in their hands (Stefanović et al. 114).

=== Age categories ===
The ancient Greeks divided athletes into three age categories, similar to what is done today. Each age category would have its separate set of coaches. The training programs for each age level varied, growing increasingly strenuous the older the athletes were. Certain coaches were selected to scout for young boys who looked particularly strong and fit. These boys would be selected to start training with the young men as soon as they were old enough (Stefanović et al.113).

=== Diet ===
Along with developing training programs and stretching exercises, the ancient Greeks also introduced special diets to athletes. Most people in ancient Greece only ate meat during religious festivals. Only the rich could have afforded it on a regular basis, but meat was still just a minor part of their diet. Fruits, vegetables, and grains grew very well in Greece and were the primary part of everyone's diet up until fifth century BCE. At that time, trainers recognized that meat was key in building muscle. At this same point in history, sports were becoming increasingly popular and athletes were given large gifts by rich admirers. Because of these gifts, athletes were able to afford much meat. Today, scientific advancements allow trainers to prescribe specific diets to athletes, but, even in ancient times without modern scientific knowledge, the Greeks were able to recognize food's beneficial effects on an athlete's diet (Briers 12-13).

=== Music ===
Ancient Greeks believed that training and music should be experienced together because they both pleased man's spirit. Music was used both in training and in competition. Each gymnasium had at least one aulos player. The aulos player's job was to produce rhythmical music in order to help the athletes, particularly when warming up. The athletes were supposed to focus primarily on accurately performing the exercises according to their trainer's advice; however, music was a key part of their warm up (Stefanović et al.112).

=== Over-training ===
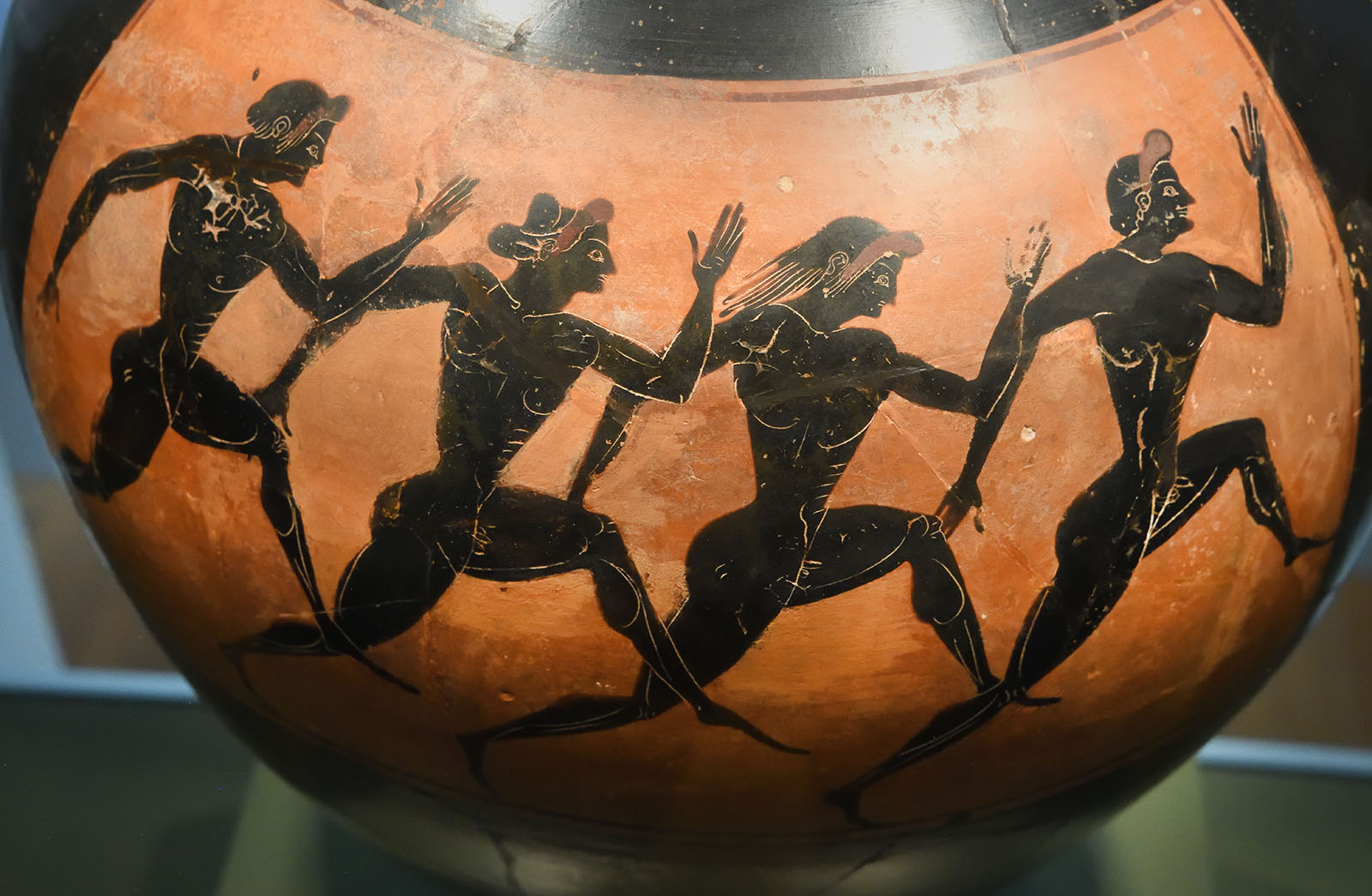
Runners featured on an Attic black-figure Panathenaic prize amphora (c. 530–520 BC)

Although many people in ancient Greece liked sports, not all philosophers thought that intense training was good. Aristotle believed that fitness should be a part of children's education, but that over-training was bad. In ancient Greece there were four main parts to education: reading, writing, gymnastic exercises, and music. Aristotle thought that an appropriate amount of exercise was a key part of education; however, he recognized how much some athletes over-trained. Aristotle referred to the excessive training that many competitive athletes did as “evil” (Stefanović et al. 113).

== Sources ==
- The Olympic Games in Antiquity. 2nd ed. N.p.: n.p., 2007. Olympic.org. 5 December 2009.
- "Olympic Sports- Foot Races." The Olympic Games. N.p., n.d. Web. 5 December 2009.
- "Running." The Ancient Olympics. N.p., n.d. Web. 5 December 2009.
- "Running events." BBC History. BBC, n.d. Web. 5 December 2009.
