= DFSA =

DFSA may refer to:

- Dubai Financial Services Authority
- Drug-facilitated sexual assault
- Deterministic finite-state automaton
