= Markus Giebel (businessman) =

German businessman executive and engineer

- Education: B.Tech in Mechanical engineering Master of Mechanical Engineering; Master of Business Administration
- Alma mater: Technical University of Munich; Switzerland Business School
- Occupations: Business executive and engineer

Markus Alexander Giebel is a German business executive and engineer. He is known for senior leadership roles in real estate development, fund management, and investment advisory services across Europe and the Middle East.

He is the Chief Executive Officer of CES Investments Limited, an investment firm regulated by the Dubai Financial Services Authority (DFSA), and the Managing Director of Northacre, a real estate developer.

== Early life and education ==
Giebel studied mechanical engineering at the Technical University of Munich, graduating with a Master of Mechanical Engineering degree in 1993. He later received a Master of Business Administration (MBA) from Switzerland Business School in 2003.

== Career ==
Giebel began his career at Corning Inc. (NYSE: GLW), a Fortune 500 materials science and telecommunications components company. He held a series of engineering and management roles over more than a decade. Giebel became the youngest Vice President in the company's history. He was also active as an inventor, registering numerous US patents in the field of optical fibre connectors and splicing technology.

From 2004 to 2008, Giebel was Chief Executive Officer of Vedera Capital LLC, a strategic advisory and private equity firm. In 2008, Giebel was appointed Chief Executive Officer of Deyaar Development PJSC, a real estate development company listed on the Dubai Financial Market and capitalised at approximately US$1.3 billion at the time. In 2010, he received the Emerging CEO Award at the Middle East Business Leaders Summit and Awards (MEBLSA). Giebel left Deyaar in early 2010.

In 2011, Giebel became an Executive Board Member and Managing Partner of Soliton Holding, an investment company.

Since 2020, Giebel has been Chief Executive Officer and owner of CES Investments Limited, a fund management and investment company incorporated in the Dubai International Financial Centre (DIFC) and regulated by the DFSA.

Since 2022, Giebel holds an Executive Board position at BE:YOND Investments, a holding company investing internationally in real estate and financial services. Since 2025, Giebel has been an Executive Board Member of Stanford Marine Group, an offshore marine services company active in the energy and maritime sectors. From 2026, he has also been an Executive Board Member of Northacre, a luxury real estate development company.

== Patents ==
During his tenure at Corning Inc., Giebel was credited as inventor or co-inventor on multiple United States patents relating to optical fibre connectors, splice mechanisms, and network infrastructure components. Selected patents include:

- US Patent 5,416,874 – Optical receiver stub fitting
- US Patent 5,727,101 – Monolithic ferrule for receiving and positioning multiple optical fibres
- US Patent 5,745,633 – Fiber optic cable assembly for securing a fiber optic cable within an input port of a splice closure
- US Patent 5,768,460 – Low skew optical fiber ribbons
- US Patent 5,778,122 – Fiber optic cable assembly for interconnecting optical fibers within an enclosure
- US Patent 5,863,083 – Pulling grip for pre-connectorized fiber optic cable
- US Patent 5,867,621 – Adapter and guide pin assembly for coupling fiber optic connectors
- US Patent 5,923,802 – Flexible connector assembly having slack
- US Patent 5,940,561 – Adapter assembly for precise alignment of fiber optic connectors
- US Patent 5,971,624 – Multi-fiber splice mechanism and splicing connector
- US Patent 6,068,410 – Splice housing assembly and associated assembly method
- US Patent 6,149,313 – Gender-selectable fiber optic connector and fabrication method
- US Patent 6,350,062 – Multifiber ferrule with tapered lead-in alignment holes
- US Patent 6,396,993 – Optical fiber breakaway apparatus and method
- US Patent 6,439,780 – Field-installable fiber optic ribbon connector and installation tool
- US Patent 6,457,874 – Wall-mountable mixed media outlet
- US Patent 6,499,887 – Windowless rectangular ferrule in a multi-fiber connector
