= Fastway Couriers =

Package delivery company

- Formerly: HB Couriers
- Type: Private
- Industry: Courier; Logistics
- Founded: 1983; 43 years ago
- Founder: Bill McGowan
- Area served: United Kingdom (NI only); South Africa
- Brands: Parcel Connect
- Website: www.fastway.ie www.fastwayni.com www.fastway.org fastway.co.za

Fastway Couriers (formerly trading as HB Couriers) is a courier delivery services company founded in Napier, New Zealand. At the peak of its service, Fastway operated delivery services in New Zealand, Australia, Ireland and South Africa. The company currently operates in Northern Ireland and South Africa.

The company has operated using a franchise model since 1983, with franchising at the regional and courier level; regional franchises are responsible for managing the sales support and depots facilities in their region, while each courier franchise manages a courier route.

Each country with Fastway operations also has a master franchisee, who is responsible for providing the money needed to established Fastway operations, and managing the inter-city transportation of parcels. Fastway Global LTD owns the Fastway branding and provides initial training to the Fastway master franchisee of each country.

Fastway Global LTD also owns the Parcel Connect branding - a booking platform for Fastway Services targeted as consumers. Parcel Connect currently operates in Australia and New Zealand.

== History since 2016 ==
In 2016, the company's New Zealand and Australia operations and all associated assets (including domains, contracts, and depots) were acquired by Aramex. As part of the acquisition by Aramex, most Fastway operations have been rebranded to Aramex in Australia and New Zealand. Branding of Fastway remained unchanged in other countries.

In 2022, London private equity company Elysian Capital took ownership of Fastway's Irish operations, becoming Ireland's Master Franchisee. In early 2023, South African logistics company City Logistics and Clearwater Capital partnered to purchase the existing Master Franchisee rights in South Africa.

In October 2025, Fastway Ireland's parent company Nuvion Group collapsed into receivership, resulting in Fastway ceasing operations in Ireland with the loss of 300 jobs. The Northern Irish and South African businesses are unaffected.
