= Pheidippides =

490 BC Greek runner from Marathon to Athens

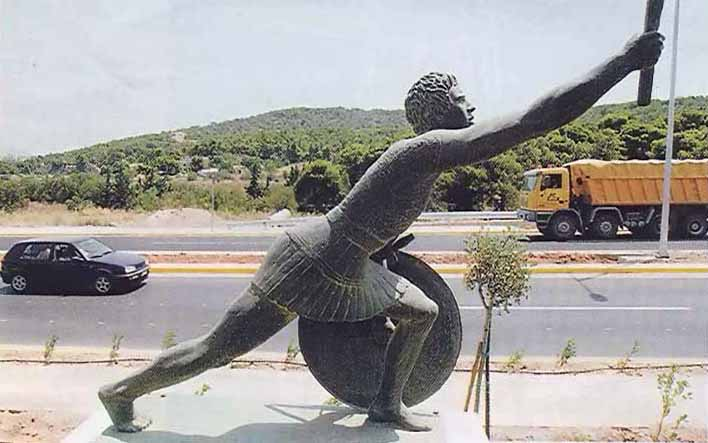
- Statue of Pheidippides alongside the Marathon Road

Pheidippides (/faɪˈdɪpədiːz/; fy-DIP-ə-deez; Ancient Greek: Φειδιππίδης, Ancient Greek pronunciation: [pʰeː.dip.pí.dɛːs], Modern Greek: [fi.ðiˈpi.ðis] lit. 'Son of Pheídippos') or Philippides (Φιλιππίδης) was a 5th-century-BC Athenian running courier who was the central figure in the story that inspired the marathon race.

The best-known version of this story is the 1879 poem Pheidippides by Robert Browning, in which Pheidippides is said to have run approximately 240 kilometres (150 mi) from Athens to Sparta (and back to Athens) before the Battle of Marathon (490 BC), in order to seek Spartan help against the Persians in the upcoming battle. Pheidippides then fought at the Battle of Marathon, and after the Athenian victory, he ran approximately 40 kilometres (25 mi) from Marathon to Athens to deliver the news. He died immediately after announcing the Athenian victory.

Browning's poem is a composite of two earlier versions of Pheidippides's story. According to the earliest-known version of the story by the historian Herodotus, Pheidippides is said to have made an Athens-to-Sparta (and return) run before the battle, but Herodotus does not mention Pheidippides fighting at Marathon, a subsequent Marathon–Athens run, or his death. A much-later version of the story by the satirist Lucian mentions only a Marathon–Athens run and Pheidippides's death; this version has been called a "[likely] romantic invention".

Pheidippides's legendary Marathon–Athens run was the inspiration for the modern 42-kilometre (26 mi) marathon race. Pheidippides's Athens–Sparta run inspired two ultramarathon races, the 246-kilometre (153 mi) Spartathlon and 490-kilometre (300 mi) Authentic Pheidippides Run.

== Name ==
The name Philippides is reported by Pausanias, Plutarch, and Lucian, writers who had read this name in their versions of Herodotus, while the form Pheidippides appears in most of Herodotus's manuscripts.

Other than Herodotus's manuscripts, the form Pheidippides is only attested in Aristophanes's The Clouds (423 BC). Many historians argue that Aristophanes willfully distorted the actual name so as not to use the name of the hero of Marathon in his play or as a play on words meaning "save horses". However, given that the name Pheidippo is attested in the Iliad, the existence of a Pheidippides cannot be excluded. Still, according to many, this form remains an error of the copyists of the manuscripts.

== Accounts ==
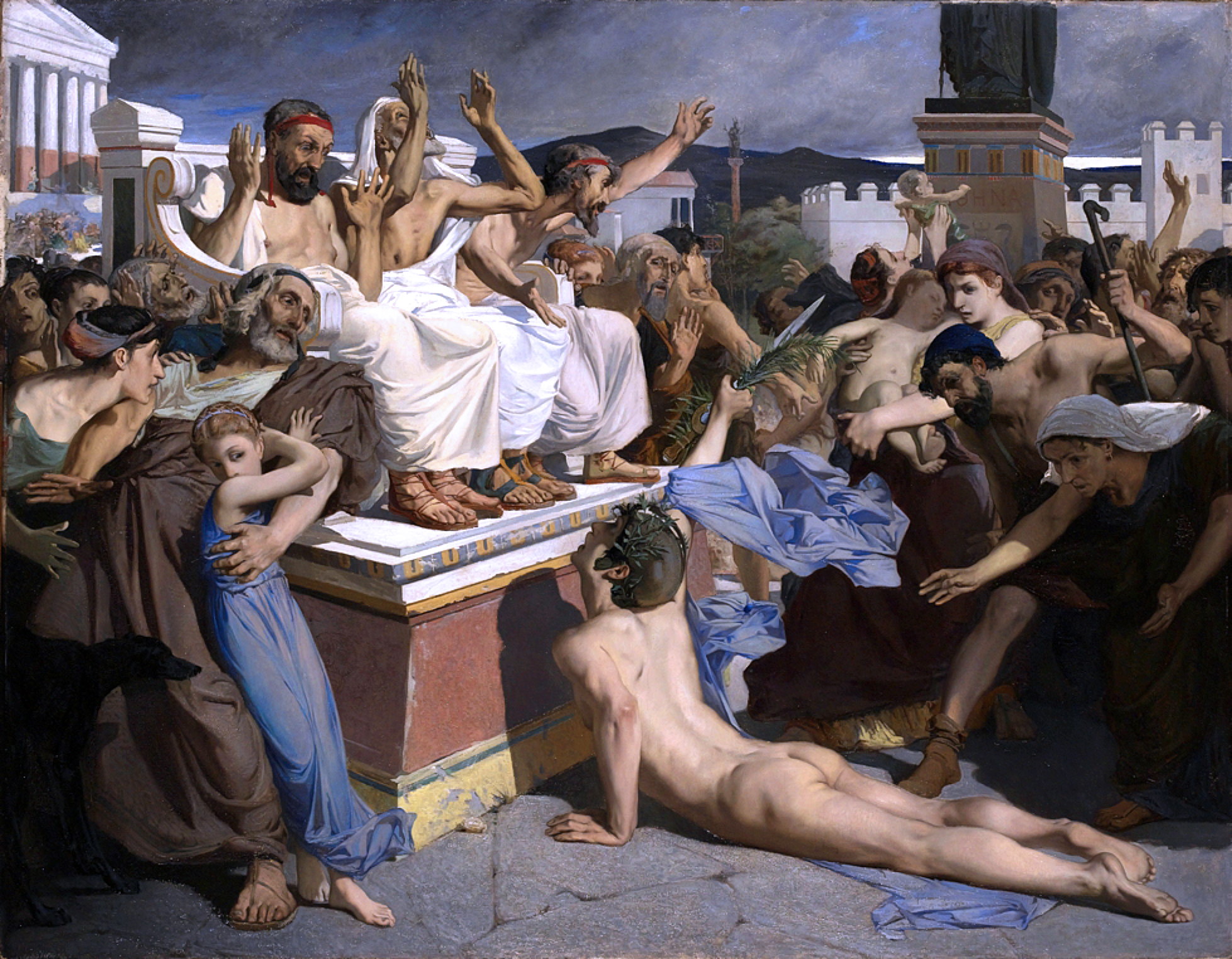
Painting of Pheidippides as he gave word of the Greek victory over Persia at the Battle of Marathon to the people of Athens. — Luc-Olivier Merson (1869)

The original story by Herodotus relates that Pheidippides, an Athenian runner, or hemerodrome (translated as 'day-runner', 'courier', 'professional-running courier' or 'day-long runner'), was sent to Sparta to request help before the Battle of Marathon against Persia in 490 BC. He ran about 240 km (150 mi) in two days, and then ran back. His account is as follows:

Before they left the city, the Athenian generals sent off a message to Sparta. The messenger was an Athenian named Pheidippides, a professional long-distance runner. According to the account he gave the Athenians on his return, Pheidippides met the god Pan on Mount Parthenium, above Tegea. Pan, he said, called him by name and told him to ask the Athenians why they paid him no attention, in spite of his friendliness towards them and the fact that he had often been useful to them in the past, and would be so again in the future. The Athenians believed Pheidippides's story, and when their affairs were once more in a prosperous state, they built a shrine to Pan under the Acropolis, and from the time his message was received they held an annual ceremony, with a torch-race and sacrifices, to court his protection.

On the occasion of which I speak – when Pheidippides, that is, was sent on his mission by the Athenian commanders and said that he saw Pan – he reached Sparta the day after he left Athens and delivered his message to the Spartan government. "Men of Sparta" (the message ran), "the Athenians ask you to help them, and not to stand by while the most ancient city of Greece is crushed and subdued by a foreign invader; for even now Eretria has been enslaved, and Greece is the weaker by the loss of one fine city." The Spartans, though moved by the appeal, and willing to send help to Athens, were unable to send it promptly because they did not wish to break their law. It was the ninth day of the month, and they said they could not take the field until the moon was full. So they waited for the full moon, and meanwhile Hippias, the son of Pisistratus, guided the Persians to Marathon.

— Herodotus

However, according to the version of the story written much later by Lucian, Pheidippides was only claimed to have run from Marathon to Athens to announce the Greek victory at the Battle of Marathon. After announcing "Joy, we win!", he collapsed and died.

In 1879, Robert Browning wrote the poem Pheidippides. Browning's poem is a composite story, combining the Athens–Sparta–Athens run of Herodotus and the Marathon–Athens run of Lucian. Browning's poem became part of late 19th-century popular culture and was accepted as a historical legend.

== Historicity ==
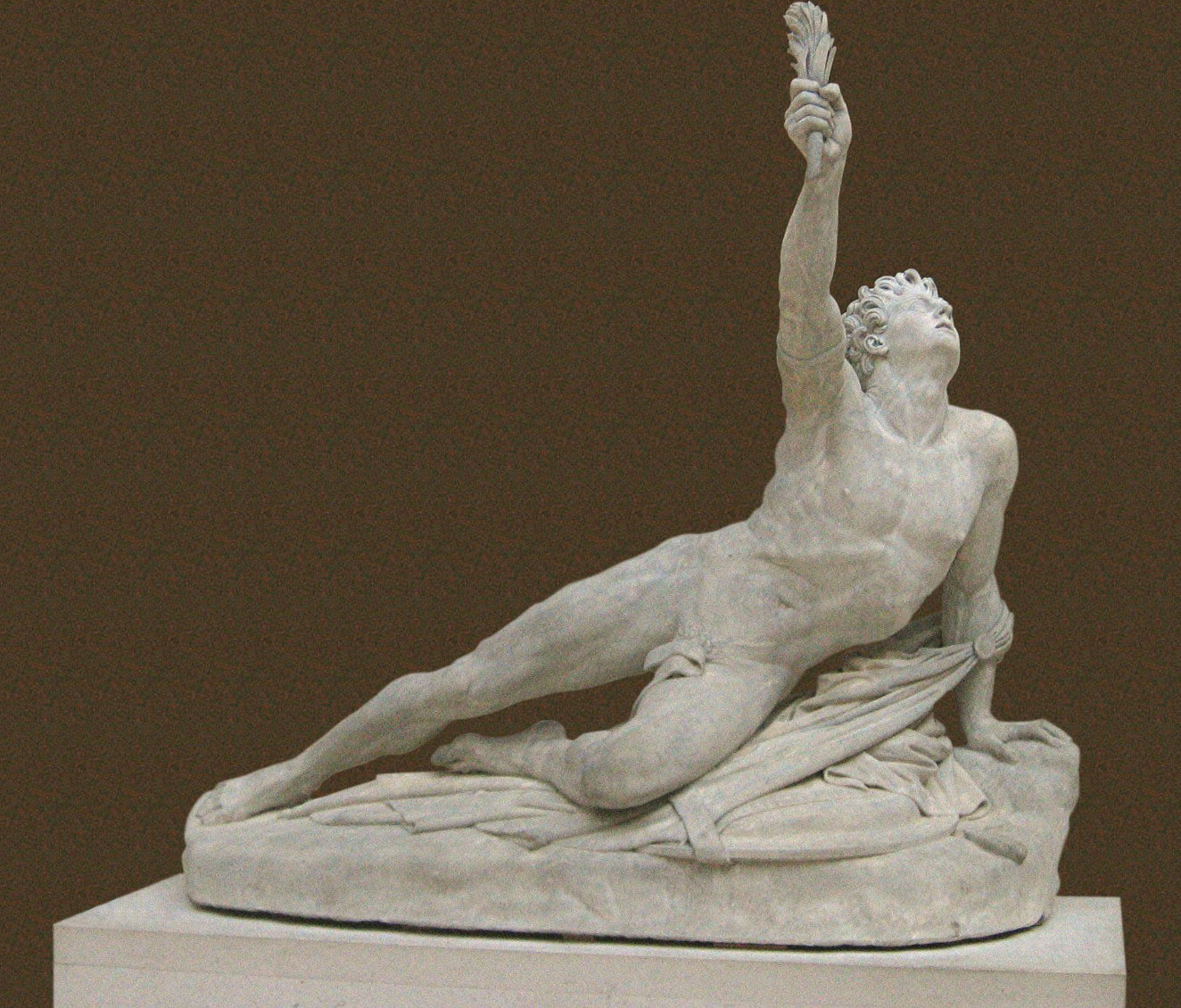
The Soldier of Marathon Announcing the Victory (1834) by Jean-Pierre Cortot; Louvre, Paris

According to Miller (2006), Herodotus, only 30–40 years removed from the events in question, based his account on eyewitnesses, so it seems altogether likely that Pheidippides was an actual historical figure. However, Miller also asserts that Herodotus did not ever mention a Marathon-to-Athens runner in any of his writings. Herodotus's silence on the evidently dramatic incident of a herald running from Marathon to Athens suggests that no such event occurred.

The first-known written account of a run from Marathon to Athens occurs in the works of the Greek writer Plutarch (46–120 AD), in his essay "On the Glory of Athens". Plutarch attributes the run to a herald called either Thersippus or Eukles. Lucian, a century later, credits one "Philippides". It seems likely that in the 500 years between Herodotus's time and Plutarch's, the story of Pheidippides had become muddled with that of the Battle of Marathon (in particular with the story of the Athenian forces making the march from Marathon to Athens in order to intercept the Persian ships headed there), and some fanciful writer had invented the story of the run from Marathon to Athens.

Magill and Moose (2003) suggest that the story of the Marathon–Athens run and Pheidippides's death is likely a "romantic invention". They point out that Lucian is the only classical source with all the elements of the story known in modern culture as the "Marathon story of Pheidippides": a messenger running from the fields of Marathon to announce victory, then dying on completion of his mission.

== Modern influence ==
The idea of the modern marathon race came from Michel Bréal, who wanted the event to feature in the first modern Olympic Games in 1896 in Athens. Bréal was inspired by Robert Browning's poem Pheidippides. The idea of a marathon race was strongly supported by Pierre de Coubertin, the founder of the modern Olympics, and by the Greeks.

Based on Herodotus's account, British RAF Wing Commander John Foden and four other RAF officers travelled to Greece in 1982 on an official expedition to test whether it was possible to cover the nearly 250 kilometres (155 miles) in a day and a half (36 hours). Three runners were successful in completing the distance: John Scholtens (34^{h}30^{m}), John Foden (37^{h}37^{m}), and John McCarthy (39^{h}00^{m}). Since 1983, it has been an annual footrace from Athens to Sparta, known as the Spartathlon, celebrating Pheidippides's run across 246 km (153 mi) of the Greek countryside.

Another run inspired by Herodotus's account, the Authentic Pheidippides Run, makes a round trip from Athens to Sparta and back.
