= Selcuk Yorgancioglu =

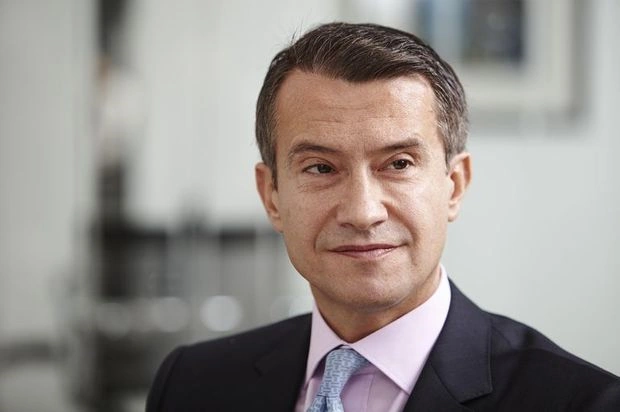
- Born: 20 May 1967 (age 59); İzmir, Turkey
- Education: University of New Haven, Istanbul University
- Occupations: Founder, Tork Partners
- Website: https://selcukyorgancioglu.com/

Selcuk Yorgancioglu (born 20 May 1967) is a Turkish-British financier. Yorgancioglu is the founding partner of Tork Partners, an advisory and investment platform he founded in 2019 to invest with, advise and help manage private and institutional investors into Turkey and regional emerging markets. He also serves on the board of Bluegrove Equity Partners, a fund management firm focused on sustainable investments, and growth opportunities globally. A keen believer in e-commerce in growth markets, Yorgancioglu acted as a strategic advisor to the executive management of GittiGidiyor, a full subsidiary of eBay between 2020 and 2022. He also served as an independent board member and vice chairman of the risk & audit committee in BUPA Acıbadem Insurance company, a full subsidiary of BUPA UK between 2019 and 2023.

As a private equity investor, Yorgancioglu has served as vice chairman or as executive board member on high profile companies, ie; Hepsiburada (second largest e-commerce business in CEMEA region and first Nasdaq listed exit out of Turkey), Fibabanka (mid-size bank), Acibadem Hospitals (largest hospital group in EM globally, subsidiary of IHH Singapore), Netlog (largest logistics services provider in CEMEA region), Republika (high-end student housing services).

Previously, he was a partner with The Abraaj Group – Abraaj Investment Management Limited. The Abraaj Group (formerly known as Abraaj Capital) was a leading private equity investor operating in the growth markets of Africa, Latin America, Middle East, South Asia, South East Asia, Turkey and Central Asia. During 2018, the firm was hit by turmoil and was subsequently put in liquidation. On 23 February 2018, The Abraaj Group announced that it has re-organised corporate structure and appointed Selcuk Yorgancioglu and Omar Lodhi as Co-Chief Executive Officers on an interim basis to assist with the sale process of its Fund Management Business - Abraaj Investment Management Limited. Yorgancioglu served as the Co-Chief Executive Officer until June 2018 after which provisional liquidators were appointed to the Abraaj Investment Management Limited Board of Directors. Yorgancioglu served as an adviser, assisting provisional liquidators in the management and sales process of various funds within Abraaj Investment Management Limited until October 2019.

Earlier, Yorgancioglu was most notable within the Turkish investment community for the investments in Fibabanka, and also Turkey's then largest e-commerce platform Hepsiburada.com, as well as Abraaj's multibillion-dollar exit from Acıbadem Healthcare Group to Khazanah Nasional/IHH, the investment holding arm of the Government of Malaysia. As part of the deal, Abraaj got 50% cash and 50% shares in IHH. IHH was later floated jointly on Malaysia and Singapore stock exchanges. Year-to-date, it was the third biggest public offering in the world in 2012. In July 2017, Yorgancioglu's team announced the acquisition of a significant minority stake in Netlog Lojistik Hizmetleri AS, a Turkish integrated logistics company with a strong presence in Europe and Asia.

Before his private equity career, between 1992 and 2008 Yorgancioglu worked at senior roles for Deutsche Bank out of London and Istanbul, Finansbank Group in Turkey, and ABN AMRO Bank and Rotschild Group out of Amsterdam and London focusing on regional emerging markets. His activities focused on structured finance, M&A, debt and equity capital markets. His last position with Deutsche Bank was the Country CEO for Turkey.

Yorgancıoğlu served on TÜSIAD (Turkish Industrialists' and Businessmen's Association) for 12 years including serving as a stand-in board member. He sat on the board of Endeavor (non-profit) Turkey, a global non-profit organisation for fostering entrepreneurship. During 2012–2013, Yorgancioglu served as a World Economic Forum Global Agenda Council member for entrepreneurship. Between 2023–2026, Yorgancioglu served on the board of Women on Board Foundation in Turkey, a mentoring program for empowering female executives, where he still serves as an active mentor.

== Background ==
Selcuk Yorgancioglu was born in 1967 in İzmir, Turkey where he attended high school in Bornova Anadolu Lisesi. He graduated from Istanbul University, Faculty of Economics and has an MBA in Finance from University of New Haven, Connecticut.

== Career ==
Selcuk Yorgancioglu started his career at İnterbank in Turkey as a management trainee in 1992. Between 1993 and 1998 he worked for ABN AMRO Group out of Amsterdam and London as part of the Emerging Markets Investment Banking Group. His latest position there was with Equity Capital Markets JV, ABN AMRO-Rothschild in London. Throughout this period, Yorgancıoğlu focused on Emerging Europe, worked on transactions and built connections in Turkey, Russia, Kazakhstan, Poland, Czech Republic, Hungary, Poland and Romania. Between 98 and 2000, Yorgancıoğlu served as an Executive Vice President and head of investment banking at Finansbank Group in Turkey where he also served on the board of the Group’s asset management business. Between September 2000 and March 2007, Yorgancıoğlu worked for Deutsche Bank in London as a part of the senior management for Emerging Markets Investment Banking Team. In his last year at Deutsche Bank between 2007 and 2008, Yorgancıoğlu took up the post of Deutsche Bank Group CEO in Turkey overseeing banking, brokerage, asset management and mortgage subsidiaries. From March 2008 Yorgancıoğlu was a partner at Abraaj with a prime responsibility for Turkey and Central Asia. Between 2008 and 2017, Yorgancıoğlu led the investment and exit processes of various transactions in the Group’s portfolio in Turkey, including the US$2.4 bln exit of Acıbadem Healthcare Group to Khazanah Nasional/IHH, the investment holding arm of the Government of Malaysia.

== See also ==
- List of private equity firms
