= Arif Naqvi =

Pakistani businessman (born 1960)

Arif Masood Naqvi
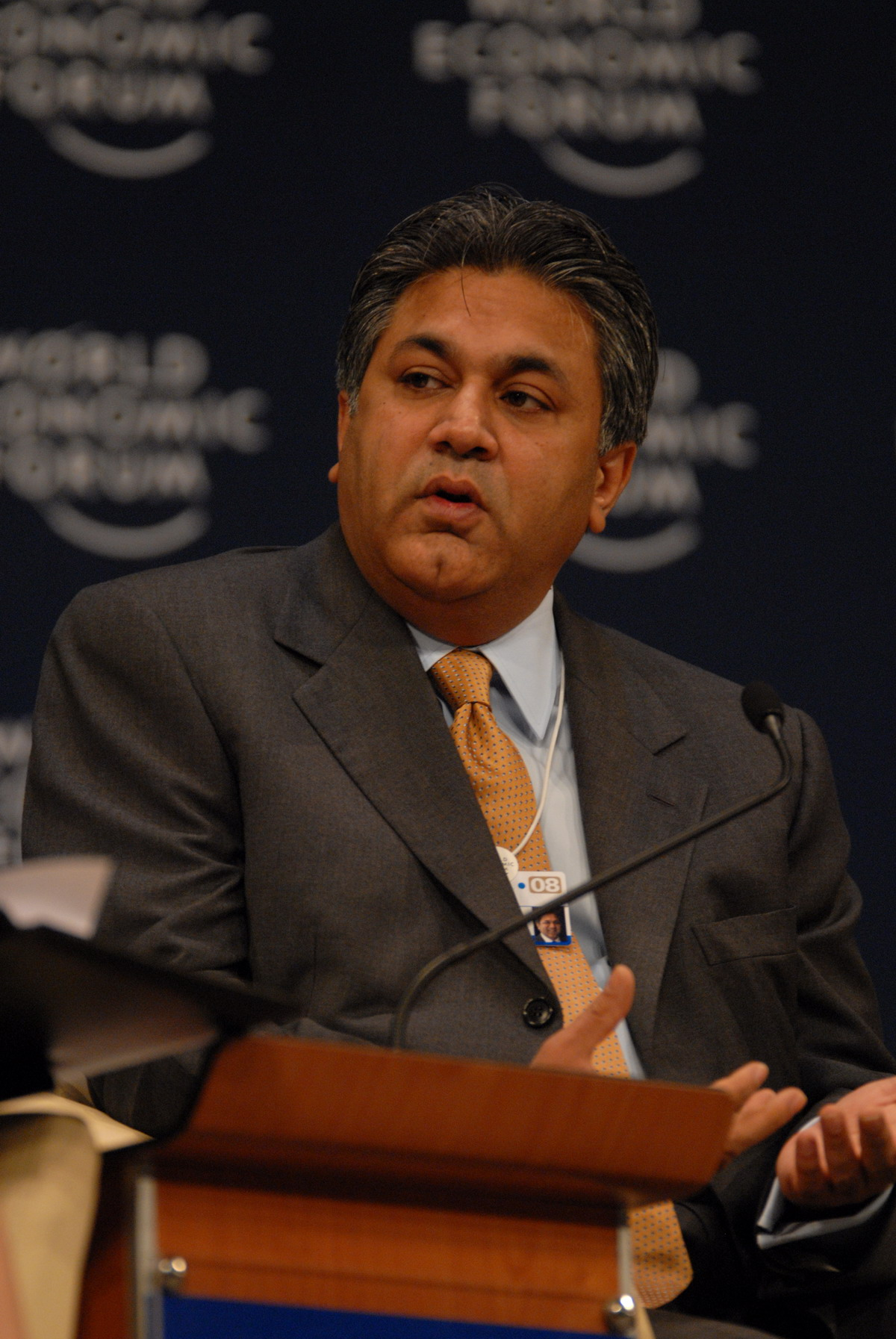
- Naqvi in 2008
- Born: Arif Masood Naqvi; 13 July 1960 (age 66); Karachi, Sindh, Pakistan
- Citizenship: Pakistan; Saint Kitts and Nevis
- Education: Karachi Grammar School
- Alma mater: London School of Economics
- Occupation: Business

Arif Masood Naqvi (born 13 July 1960) is a Pakistani businessman, who was the founder and chief executive of the Dubai-based private equity firm, The Abraaj Group and Aman Foundation. The Abraaj Group was founded in 2002 and operated in Africa, Asia, Latin America, Middle East, Turkey and Central Asia, and is currently in liquidation due to accusations of fraud.

== Early life and education ==
Naqvi was born in a business family. His father was a small plastics manufacturing company owner. He completed his early education from Karachi Grammar School and graduated from London School of Economics.

== Career ==
Arif Naqvi began his career with Arthur Andersen in London and American Express in Karachi. In the early 1990s, he joined the Olayan Group in Saudi Arabia, the Kingdom's largest trading company. In 1994 he started an investment firm in Dubai called Cupola with $50,000 of his own savings. In 1999, Naqvi purchased Inchcape Middle East, for $102 million, with $4.1 million in equity, making it the MENA region's first leveraged buyout. Naqvi then sold off pieces of the company for a total of $173 million.

In 2002, Naqvi founded Abraaj Capital, and in 2012 the company merged with Aureos Capital to become The Abraaj Group. As of March 2018, Arif Naqvi has stepped down as CEO of The Abraaj Group, as the company has become the subject of multiple investigations regarding its fund management practices.

Naqvi is known as a collector of art and for establishing a collection of Middle Eastern art. In 2018, art owned by Naqvi was sold through Christie's for £2 million.

== Allegations, criminal charges and legal issues ==
In September 2017, "while Arif was in New York, the employee broke ranks and sent an anonymous email to investors"…"about years of wrongdoing at Abraaj".

In January 2018, Bill and Melinda Gates Foundation, and three other investors in Naqvi's Abraaj Growth Markets Health Fund recruited forensic accountants to investigate where their money had gone.

In February 2018, World Bank and the Bill and Melinda Gates Foundation wanted to know why over $200 million in cash was sitting with the fund, and not invested.

In February 2018, Naqvi was accused by Andrew Farnum at the Bill and Melinda Gates Foundation, and other investors of misappropriating funds, leading to the provisional liquidation of The Abraaj Group. The company also came under investigation by regulators in Dubai.

Also in October 2018, the Wall Street Journal published an article that Abraaj Group allegedly paid US$20 million to Pakistani businessman, Navaid Malik, for his assistance in securing cooperation of the Sharif brothers for the sale of its investment in Pakistan's utility, Karachi Electric.

On 5 April 2019, Naqvi was arrested by authorities in the United Kingdom after he was charged by the United States Department of Justice with fraud, misleading investors and misappropriating $230 million from Abraaj Growth Markets Health Fund. In early May 2019, Naqvi was granted bail by a London court pending a hearing for his extradition to the United States, with restrictions including a record £15 million GBP (US$20 million) surety and other conditions amounting to effective house arrest.

In July 2019, two Abraaj entities were fined US$315 million by the Dubai Financial Services Authority and Naqvi was sentenced to three years imprisonment in absentia in the United Arab Emirates on charges of financial fraud.

In November 2021, High Court Judge Philippa Whipple adjourned the matter Naqvi extradition until a point of law was resolved in another similar high-profile extradition case - that of Nirav Modi, an Indian diamond tycoon.

In December 2022, the 'point of law' appeal, was denied and the High Court also refused permission for Modi, to appeal to the Supreme Court of the United Kingdom and he was ordered to pay associated legal costs of £150,247, for the application.

In January 2022, the Dubai Financial Services Authority personally fined Naqvi $135.6 million for his role in the collapse of Abraaj.

In July 2022, the Financial Times revealed in its article results of its investigation that Abraaj founder Arif Naqvi's Cayman Islands-incorporated company Wootton Cricket Ltd bankrolled Pakistan's political party, Tehreek-e-Insaf (PTI) which is led by former Prime Minister Imran Khan during 2013, after receiving funds from companies and individuals including at least £2 million in April 2013 from Sheikh Nahyan bin Mubarak al-Nahyan, a United Arab Emirates government minister who is also a member of the Abu Dhabi royal family and Chairman of Pakistan's Bank Alfalah. Naqvi was under UK house arrest and was electronically tagged while on a £15 million bail as he fought extradition from the UK to the US.

On 8 March 2023, Naqvi lost his challenge to extradition from London to the United States, as a UK High Court Judge refused Naqvi permission to bring a judicial review against the 2021 approval of his extradition to the US. This means that the extradition order authorized by the then UK Home Secretary Priti Patel will be executed, and Naqvi will be sent to a US prison to face trial on fraud allegations by US authorities.

== Philanthropy ==
In 2008, Naqvi and his family established the Aman Foundation, a local, not-for-profit trust in Pakistan, focusing on health, nutrition and education.

== Awards ==
In 2007, Naqvi was granted the Sitara-i-Imtiaz by the Government of Pakistan, in recognition of his outstanding service in the field of public services. In 2015, Naqvi was awarded with the BNP Paribas Grand Prix for Individual Philanthropy by BNP Paribas.

Naqvi is a founding commissioner of the Business & Sustainable Development Commission (BSDC), alongside Paul Polman and Mo Ibrahim.

== Sources ==
- Simon Clark and Will Louch, The Key Man: The True Story of How the Global Elite Was Duped by a Capitalist Fairy, Harper Business (2021) ISBN 978-0-06-299621-3 - The story of Pakistani ex-CEO, Arif Naqvi
- Brian Brivati, Icarus: The Life and Death of the Abraaj Group, Biteback Publishing (2021), ISBN 978-1785907180
- Brivati, Brian (2021). Arif Naqvi's Abraaj Group & the Geopolitics of Karachi Electric. Vanguard Books. ISBN 978-969-402-642-8.
