= Parcel Direct Ireland =

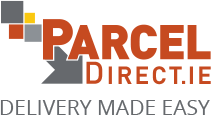
- Company type: Private
- Industry: Courier
- Founded: 2014; 12 years ago
- Founder: Stephen O' Sullivan
- Headquarters: Ireland
- Area served: Worldwide
- Key people: Stephen O' Sullivan
- Number of employees: 10
- Website: parceldirect.ie

Parcel Direct Ireland is a courier service provider used by the public worldwide.

Founded by Stephen O’ Sullivan in 2014, the company is headquartered in Cork City, and provides parcel delivery services to individuals and small businesses across Ireland.

In 2015, the company launched its e-commerce solutions in line with the Government National Digital Strategy. This includes working with the Local Enterprise Boards.

In 2016, Parcel Direct Ireland was nominated for the Blacknight SME Awards for its developments.

Parcel Direct has a network of over 200 local drop-off and collection points nationwide.
