= Ali Ghandour =

Lebanese-Jordanian businessman (1931–2020)

- Born: 28 May 1931; Beirut, French Lebanon
- Died: 29 August 2020 (aged 89); Beirut, Lebanon
- Children: Fadi Ghandour

Ali Ghandour (Arabic: علي غندور; 28 May 1931 – 29 August 2020) was a Lebanese-Jordanian businessman, the president of ARAM Trading and Technology. He was a native of Lebanon and a Jordanian citizen. Ghandour died on 29 August 29, 2020.

== Education and early life ==
Ghandour was born on 28 May 1931, in Beirut, Lebanon where he spent most of his youth, he was admitted to IC, a private co-educational preparatory school to the American University of Beirut which he graduated from later with Aerospace engineering degree. He also went for further education at New York University - United States. Gandour went back to Lebanon in 1954 and joined the Lebanese Civil Aviation Authority as an engineer and Head of aviation Safety.

Ghandour's political tendencies led him to join the Syrian Social Nationalist Party (SSNP) whose members were chased after by the Lebanese government due to a failed coup which the party attempted in 1961. Despite the fact that Ghandour was in Paris on a training course during the coup, he was wanted by the Lebanese government and considered a fugitive. Thus, Gandour took refuge at Paris then Côte d'Ivoire which he left later to Kuwait.

Ghandour's refuge in Kuwait was accepted by the Kuwaiti authorities as long as no conviction was issued by the Lebanese government for his arrest. Ghandour remained and worked for the Directorate General of Civil Aviation in Kuwait not long before a death sentence in absentia was issued by Lebanon which forced him to leave immediately to Jordan.

== Career ==
Ghandour and colleagues from the (SSNP) went to meet up with King Hussein to thank him for Jordan's acceptance of refuge. The meeting was Ghandour's life turning point when King Hussein asked him about his future plans to which Ghandour's intentions were to travel back to West Africa. King Hussein did not recommend Ghandour's plans, instead he offered him to remain in Jordan in order to establish a new national airline to which Ghandour accepted.

Gandour presented the Feasibility study to King Hussein which he liked and gave orders to commence the project backed up by a Royal decree in 1963 . A week later, a DCC plane was leased from Lebanese International Airways and was scheduled to fly to Jerusalem and Beirut. Two more Dart Heralds of Royal Jordanian Air Force were provided by King Hussein to convert into civilian planes for usage in the newly established airline.

Gandour's recommendation to name the new airline Royal Jordanian was approved by King Hussein, the name was also extended to ALIA after the king's eldest daughter Princess Alia. (It is a common misconception that the airline was named after the King's third wife, Queen Alia.)

A devoted supporter of the American University of Beirut, Ghandour served as trustee (1979–2008) and was named trustee emeritus in 2008.

=== Positions held ===
- Founder and Chairman of Arab Wings
- Founder and chairman of Royal Jordanian
- Director of Jet Airways
- Member of advisory board at MerchantBridge & Co
- Founder and board member of Aramex
- Board Member of Nas Air
- Board of Trustees of the American University of Beirut
- Co-chairman of Aviation Pioneers
- Advisor to King Hussein on civil aviation, civil air transport and tourism
- Member of Board at ARAM International Investments
- Member of Board at Jordan Tourism Resorts Company
- Founder of Arab Air Cargo
- Founder of Royal Jordanian Air Academy
- Member of Board at Reaching Hearts for Kids
- Board of Trustees of the Royal Society of Fine Arts
- Board of Trustees of the Royal Endowment for Culture and Education
- Member of Arab Thought Forum
- Member of Saadeh Cultural Foundation

== Awards and decorations ==
- Grand Cordon of the Order of Al Nahda of Jordan
- Grand Decoration of Honour in Silver with Sash for Services to the Republic of Austria (3rd Cl., 1980)
- Commandeur d'Ordre National du Merite de la Legion of Honour of France
- National Order of the Cedar, Lebanon

== See also ==
- Ahmed Ghandour
- Fadi Ghandour
