= Ahmed Ghandour =

Ahmed Ghandour may refer to:

- Ahmed Ghandour (militant) (1967–2023), Palestinian Hamas militant
- Ahmed Ghandour (scientist), Jordanian scientist, solar energy expert and industrial engineering professor
- Ahmed El-Ghandour, better known as Da7ee7, Egyptian YouTuber and educator
