= ECourier =

Courier service based in the United Kingdom

eCourier
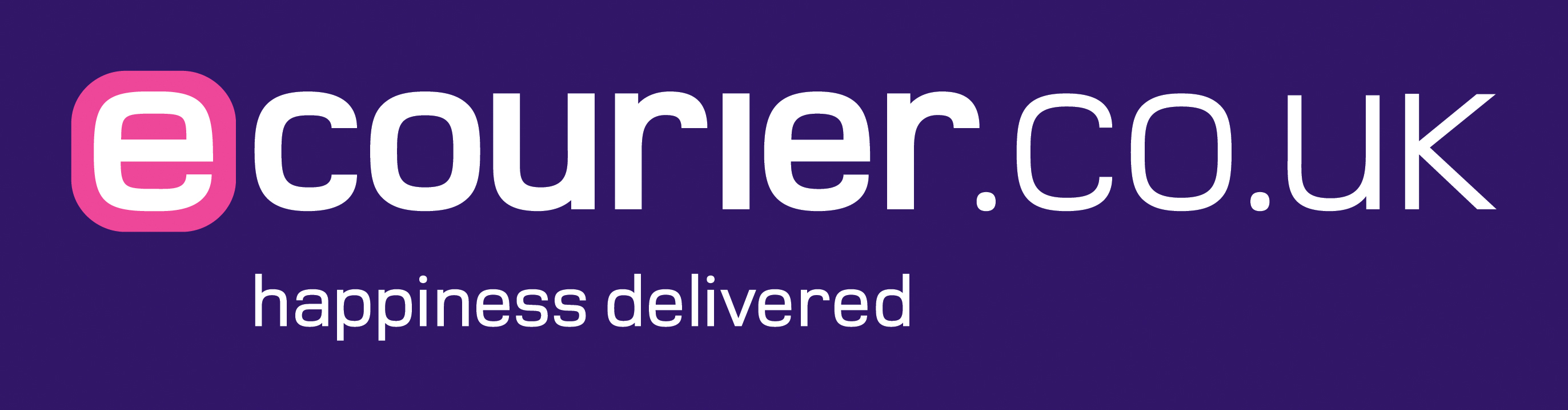
- Type: Private
- Industry: Logistics
- Genre: Corporate Histories
- Founded: London, United Kingdom (2003)
- Founder: Tom Allason; Jay Bregman
- Headquarters: London
- Services: Same day courier services
- Number of employees: 230
- Website: ecourier.co.uk

eCourier is a courier service based in the United Kingdom.

Courier positions are tracked by GPS and an intelligent dispatch system assigns orders via GPRS, improving efficiency in a traditional industry. A computer algorithm distributes orders to couriers in real time based on location, traffic, weather and demand. The algorithm was developed by a team of academics in Italy.

The company stores the historical GPS positions of its couriers, and uploads this information to OpenStreetMap. This information is also offered to the public via an API under a Creative Commons license. As of October 2008, their data set included over 252 million historical positions.

The company was founded by Tom Allason and Jay Bregman, after event tickets were lost by a motorcycle courier. The business won Allason recognition as a Growing Business Top Gun 2007, and Bregman from the British Computer Society as 2005 IT Director of the Year.

Investors in the company include Esther Dyson and Stuart Wheeler. Venture Capital firm Logispring also owned a minority stake in the company. In 2007, the company won the Evening Standard’s Most Inspirational Business award. In 2008, Allason left the company to pursue a new venture. and the following year, launched Shutl.

In 2009, eCourier reached 6 on Deloitte’s list of UK’s 50 Fastest Growing Technology Businesses. and #53 on The Sunday Times Tech Track list of Britain's fastest growing private technology companies. In November 2015, eCourier was acquired by Royal Mail, and now has one of the largest and most recognisable courier fleets in London and the South.
