= Aramex =

International delivery and logistics company

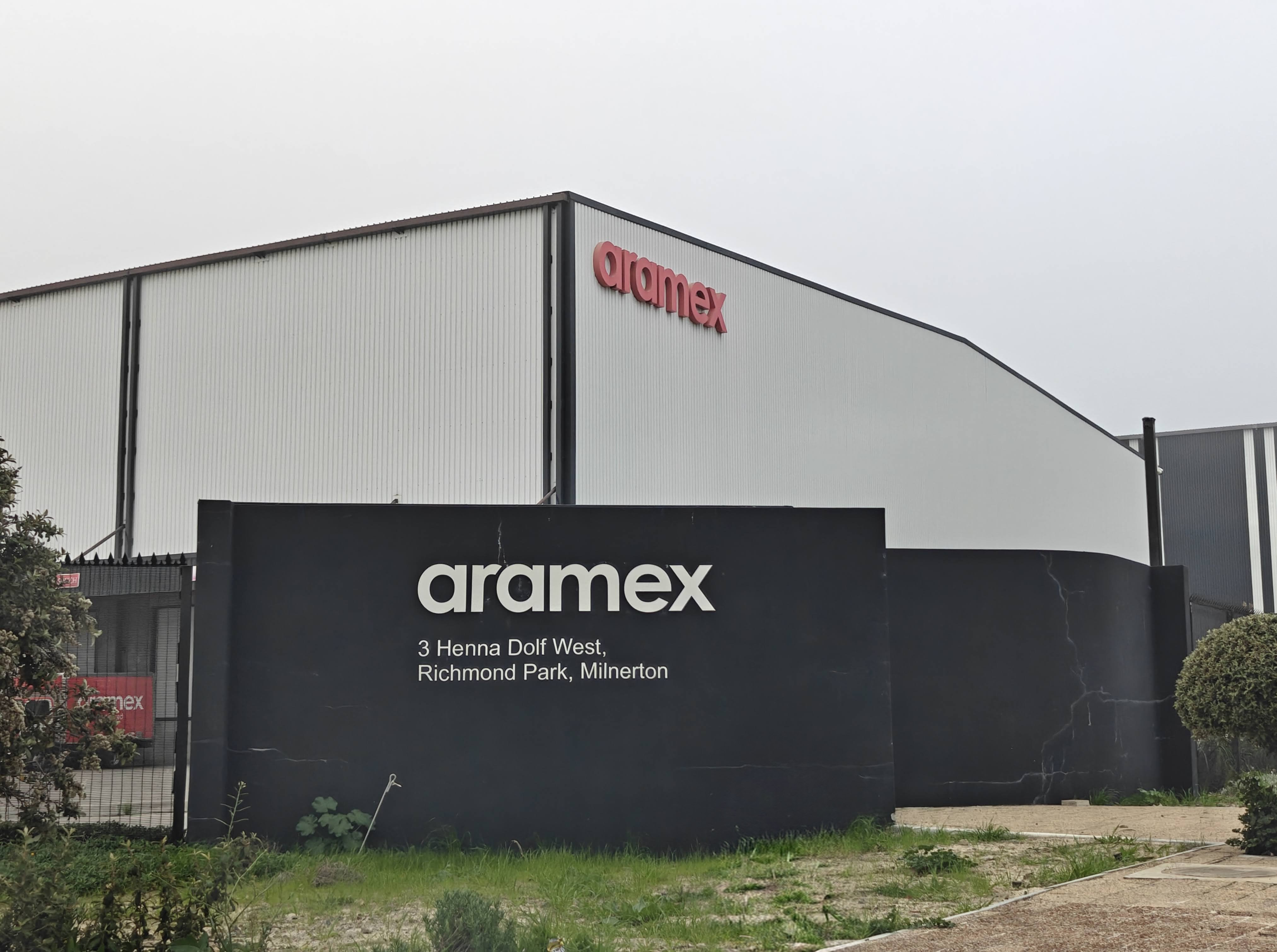
- Aramex warehouse in Cape Town, South Africa
- Type: Public
- Traded as: DFM: ARMX
- Industry: Courier; Freight forwarding; Express logistics
- Founded: 1982; 44 years ago in Amman, Jordan
- Founder: Bill Kingson; Fadi Ghandour
- Headquarters: Dubai, United Arab Emirates
- Key people: Nicolas Sibuet (Acting CEO)
- Services: Express Logistics; Freight Forwarding; Logistics; Shop & Ship; Warehousing; Customs Clearance
- Revenue: ▲US$1.732 billion (2025)
- Operating income: ▼US$83.22 million (2021)
- Net income: ▼US$5.604 million (2025)
- Total assets: US$1.47 billion (2021)
- Total equity: ▼US$728.54 million (2021)
- Owner: Abu Dhabi Developmental Holding Company (40.47%); Geopost (28%); Abu Dhabi Ports Company (22.69%)
- Number of employees: 16,292 (2025)
- Website: www.aramex.com

Aramex is an Emirati multinational logistics, courier and package delivery company based in Dubai, United Arab Emirates. The company was founded by Fadi Ghandour and Bill Kingson in 1982 in Amman, Jordan.

Aramex is majority-owned by the Abu Dhabi sovereign wealth fund Abu Dhabi Developmental Holding Company (ADQ). It is the first Arab-based company to be listed on the NASDAQ stock exchange. Aramex is listed on the Dubai Financial Market. Nicolas Sibuet is Acting CEO of the company. Aramex has approximately 18,000 employees in 70 countries.

Thomas Friedman profiled the company in his book, The World Is Flat.

== History ==
Fadi Ghandour co-founded Aramex shortly after receiving his BA in political science from George Washington University, with his business partner, Bill Kingson in 1982. Kingson, a friend of Ghandour's father and owner of a small courier company in the New York tri-state area, discussed the business with Fadi Ghandour after he had expressed interest in the business. After their discussion, Kingson proposed a partnership to establish a courier business in the Middle East with Ghandour.

The company began operations in Amman, Jordan. Arab American Express aimed to become the first courier company in the Middle East. At the time there were no international courier companies based in the region because of logistical and bureaucratic challenges caused by civil wars and complex political relationships. The company's first international delivery was a document for the Housing Bank for Trade and Finance based in Jordan to New York City. Within two years, the company's name was shortened to Aramex.

In 1984, the company's operations were less than US$1 million in revenue. That year, Aramex offered Airborne Express 50% ownership of the company for US$100,000 but Airborne Express declined the offer because it did not have the resources to invest in a small market such as the Middle East. The partnership made Aramex responsible for Airborne's business in the region. Aramex moved its headquarters to Dubai, United Arab Emirates in 1985.

Aramex gained Federal Express as a client in 1987. In the first year of the partnership, 30% of Aramex's revenue came from packages originating from the Federal Express network. Airborne Express acquired 9% of Aramex for US$2 million. Aramex was listed on the NASDAQ stock exchange in January 1997. The company became the first Arab-based company to trade its shares on an American stock exchange. Aramex's valuation was US$24 million and the IPO raised US$7 million. The company accrued US$66 million in revenue.

The company expanded its operations to 120 locations in 33 countries, primarily emerging markets in the Middle East and Southeast Asia by 2001. The company's strategy was to enter high-growth markets characterized by high populations and liberalizing economies. During summer 2001, Abraaj Capital, the first private equity firm in the Middle East, proposed Aramex a leveraged buyout offer that would take the company off of the NASDAQ stock exchange. The deal was accepted and Abraaj Capital acquired the majority of Aramex for US$65 million in February 2002. The deal allowed Kingson and Airborne to exit, while Ghandour retained 25% of the company and management control. Abraaj acquired 75% of Aramex and made 6% of its shares available to company employees in the form of stock. Between 2002 and 2003 Aramex's net income rose from US$4 million to US$10 million.

In 2003, DHL acquired Airborne Express, Aramex's main United States partner. This resulted in Airborne Express exiting the Airborne Alliance. In the same year, Aramex took over the alliance and co-founded the Global Distribution Alliance (GDA), a global alliance of 40 express companies with combined revenues of US$7.5 billion. Aramex is chairing the alliance which uses a shipment management system developed by the company.

Aramex went public on the Dubai Financial Market in February 2005. The IPO raised US$270 million. The company's revenue increased 23% over 2004 and net income increased 56% that year.

As part of its expansion plans, Aramex concluded a series of acquisitions, including Priority Airfreight, InfoFort, Freight Professionals and TwoWay-Vanguard.

World-renowned writer and columnist Thomas Friedman used Aramex in his book, The World Is Flat, as an example of companies that benefit from what he calls "the flattening of the world." The flattening of the world is the leveling of the economic field and the destruction of "barriers to entry" to collaborate or compete globally.

=== Expansion ===
In February 2011, Aramex acquired OneWorld Courier and In-Time Couriers, two Kenyan courier firms. Aramex acquired Berco Express, a South African logistics firm in December 2011. PayPal partnered with Aramex in 2012. The partnership gave PayPal credibility in the Middle East while opening up new markets abroad for Aramex. Aramex developed REDe, a solution aimed at enabling companies to begin selling their products online, in early 2012. ShopGo, an e-commerce solution, released Aramex Suite in August 2013. The module enabled e-commerce stores to automatically access several of Aramex's services.

Aramex launched Aramex Bio, a medical courier service, in March 2014. The service was launched in the Middle East and North Africa. In June 2014, Aramex acquired Mail Call Couriers, an Australian courier service, which at the end of 2016 was acquired by Australia Post. In January 2016, Fastway Couriers, a New Zealand-based courier service with operations in New Zealand, Australia, South Africa and Ireland, announced that Aramex had acquired its New Zealand and Australian operations. In 2019, Aramex acquired Saudi Tal for Commerce and Contract Company to expand its operations in Saudi Arabia.

In October 2021, GeoPost, the express parcel arm of French Groupe La Poste, acquired a 20.15% stake in Aramex.

In November 2025, Express services in Syria were restarted for the first time after the Syrian civil war.

== Sustainability ==
The company supported the Ruwwad Al Tanmeya initiative in 2006. The initiative aimed to involve the private sector in spurring community development through youth empowerment and investments in the community through education, civic engagement, and volunteering. Aramex has a twenty percent stake in Ruwwad Al Tanmeya.

Aramex became the first company in the region to release an annual sustainability report in 2006. The company joined the United Nations Global Compact, the world's largest global corporate citizenship initiative, in 2007.

== Controversies ==
=== Alleged mistreatment of contractors in New Zealand ===
Aramex has operated in New Zealand and Australia since 2016, when it acquired the operations of Fastway Couriers. These were rebranded to Aramex in 2019. Aramex competes in the New Zealand market as a low-priced alternative to New Zealand Post and Freightways-owned New Zealand Couriers and Post Haste.

Aramex has a poor reputation for service in New Zealand, with recurrent reports of delayed, damaged and misdelivered parcels, as well as poor customer support from a team which is largely based overseas.

Their business model has come under significant criticism from former and current employees, franchisees, labour advocates and WorkSafe, New Zealand's workplace safety advocate, with one critic calling it "destructive, exploitative and dangerous". Under this model, Aramex sells regional franchises, who in turn sell or subcontract “routes” or “territories” within their regions to individual contractor-drivers. These contracts can cost up to NZ$20,000, excluding vehicles, uniforms and equipment like electronic scanners.

Contractor-drivers pay their own costs, with Aramex paying a per-item fee that is set by them. These can reportedly be as low as NZ$0.3 for a parcel booked through Trade Me. Just 20% of a regional depot's revenue is split evenly between the contractor-drivers (couriers), regardless of how large their regional franchises are, which has reportedly led to significant discrepancies in income depending on their territories. The remaining 80% is divided between regional franchisees and Aramex. As a result, research from courier advocacy group ProDrive found Auckland Aramex contractors earning an average of NZ$12.78 per hour before tax in 2021 (well below the minimum wage of NZ$20 per hour), while others have reported similar take-home incomes of between NZ$11–12 per hour before tax.

Despite being legally independent contractors, and despite recruitment advertising promoting the chance to "be your own boss" and "work your own hours," they are reportedly prohibited from refusing work assigned to them, and are at risk of being financially penalised, or stripped of their territory, for failing to meet predetermined “key performance indicators”. As a result, contractor-drivers have reportedly been forced to work 6 or 7 days per week most weeks, and up to 16 hours per day, to complete pre-determined pickups and clear parcel backlogs from retail customers like Briscoes, Rebel Sport and Temu, or risk either being penalised or being forced to pay up to $50 per hour to contract someone else to assist with this work. Many have reportedly being forced to do work such as sorting parcels at depots, which is not technically part of their job remit, alongside their obligated delivery and pickup runs. Reports of exhaustion, accidents and near-misses by contractor-drivers, including one who fell asleep at a Christchurch intersection in 2024, are common.
