= Runner (messenger) =

Military foot messenger

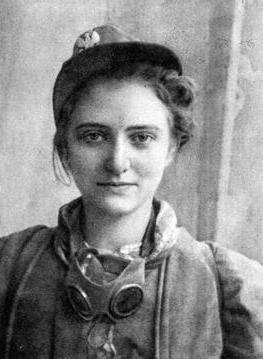
A Polish runner (łączniczka) during the Warsaw Uprising (1944).

A runner was a foot soldier responsible for carrying messages between units during war. Runners were very important to military communications, before telecommunications became commonplace. Non-military runners were also used, e.g., by World War II resistance fighters.

In Ancient Greece, Hemerodromoi (day-runners), Hemeroscopoi (day-watchers) and Dromokerykes (runner heralds) were employed to carry important news and perform surveillance. They swiftly relayed the information to the appropriate authorities, ensuring timely responses to emerging situations.

When equipped with a bicycle or other transport, the runner became a despatch rider.

== 20th century ==
Even though field telephones were widely used for the first time during World War I (1914–18), they relied on copper wire lines, which were often damaged or unreliable, or simply unavailable as troops advanced. Radio technology existed, but was generally regarded as too insecure for frontline use. Most armies still made extensive use of runners throughout the war.

Runners were lightly equipped with only a sidearm, canteen and a light pack.

On battlefields dominated by automatic weapons and trench warfare, as well as the first widespread use of artillery and air attacks, runners faced one of the most dangerous jobs as they had to leave the relative safety of a shelter, and carry messages to other positions. For the same reasons, officers could not be sure that their message had been delivered until a runner returned to their unit. Runners were frequently decorated for bravery. Adolf Hitler, who was a runner in the Bavarian Army during World War I, was wounded twice and received both the Iron Cross first class and second class during the war.
