= J&T Express =

Indonesian logistics company

- Trade name: J&T Express
- Industry: Logistics; express delivery
- Founded: August 2015; 11 years ago
- Founder: Jet Lee; Tony Chen
- Headquarters: Jakarta, Indonesia
- Area served: Indonesia; Vietnam; Malaysia; Thailand; Philippines; Cambodia; Singapore; China; UAE; Saudi Arabia; Brazil; Mexico; Colombia; Egypt; Germany
- Key people: Jet Jie Li (Chairman, CEO & Executive Director); Steven Suzhou Fan (Executive President)
- Website: www.jtexpress.com

J&T Express (Chinese: 极兔速递) is an international delivery company founded in August 2015 in Jakarta, Indonesia. Its core business is express services and cross-border logistics.

With over 300,000 service personnel worldwide, J&T Express' network spans 13 countries including China, Indonesia, Vietnam, Malaysia, Thailand, the Philippines, Cambodia, Singapore, the UAE, Saudi Arabia, Brazil, Mexico, Colombia and Egypt.

== History ==
J&T, whose Chinese name means "speedy rabbit", was founded in 2015 by entrepreneurs Jet Lee, former CEO of Oppo Indonesia, and Tony Chen, who had founded the smartphone brand in 2004.

In 2018, the company expanded into Malaysia and Vietnam; then the Philippines, Thailand and Cambodia, in 2019; Singapore and China in 2020; and the UAE, Saudi Arabia, Mexico and Egypt in 2022. It received Indonesian Top Brand Awards in 2018 and 2019.

In 2019, J&T was the fourth-largest delivery company, and the eighth unicorn in Indonesia. As of April 2021, the company was valued by investors at US$ 8 billion. In December 2021, the company was ranked as the 16th-largest unicorn in the world on the Hurun Index. It is one of the two decacorns in Indonesia.

In March 2021, the company launched J&T Express premium air freight, its first all-cargo aircraft. By November, J&T had raised an additional US$ 2.5 billion, with a valuation of US$ 20 billion and investments from Boyu Capital, Hillhouse Capital Group, Sequoia Capital China, and Tencent Holdings. Reports indicated that J&T was planning to go public in Hong Kong in 2022, and that CICC, Bank of America and Morgan Stanley were preparing its IPO. In December 2021, the company acquired the logistics operations in China of rival BEST Inc. for about 6.8 billion yuan (US$ 1.1 billion).

In early 2022, J&T expanded into Saudi Arabia and the UAE, then Latin America, with a new facility in Mexico. In February 2022, at LEAP, the company announced plans to build its MENA regional headquarters in Riyadh, Saudi Arabia, where it intends to construct the largest smart logistics industrial park in the region. That June, it expanded its network into 13 countries with the launch of J&T Express Egypt.

In October 2023, J&T Global Express Limited, the parent company of J&T Express, listed on the Main Board of the Hong Kong Stock Exchange under the stock code 1519. The global offering comprised about 326.6 million shares at an offer price of HK$12.00 per share. The listing was reported as one of the largest initial public offerings in Hong Kong in 2023.

=== Increase of deliveries during COVID-19 in Indonesia ===
The COVID-19 pandemic in Indonesia resulted in a 50% increase in J&T deliveries during Ramadhan in 2020, compared to the previous year, and its handling of up to three million packages each day. J&T Express has given aid packages to cities severely affected by the outbreak, such as Surabaya and Tangerang. Medical aid packages were also given to hospitals.

== Controversies ==
After a video went viral of workers throwing packages in 2020, J&T Express Philippines stated that it would sanction personnel involved in mishandling the packages. Similar video showing J&T Express Indonesian workers also circulated on the Internet in 2019.

Media Konsumen, an Indonesian consumer complaints platform, received multiple letters complaining about faulty sorting and lack of transparency and accountability in J&T Express delivery tracking, resulting in customers' packages being lost or sent to wrong delivery addresses.

On 4 February 2021, videos of protests and rioting at J&T Express Malaysia warehouses circulated on Malaysian social media channels. J&T subsequently issued a statement that the incident had resulted from a misunderstanding about bonus payments, and not due to a pay cut, as previously alleged online. The following week, the incident was attributed to additional workload, combined with employee payment concerns by the Ministry of Human Resources. Several workers also recorded an apology video to J&T Express and customers, stating that there had been no deductions or wage issues between the company and employees of J&T Express Perak.

On 18 July 2023, an investigation by the human resources department of J&T Express found out that four people from the Malaysia branch of J&T Express had committed fraud, which two of them are terminated from the contract of employment while the other two had been fired due to violation of Malaysian laws and regulations.

== See also ==
- List of unicorn startup companies
