= Ahmed Ghandour (scientist) =

Jordanian scientist and academic

Ahmed Ghandour was a Jordanian scientist, solar energy expert and a professor of industrial engineering at the Hashemite University. The Association of Energy Engineers has rated it as the Energy Manager of the Year for the Middle East. Dr. Ghandour was honored by King Abdullah II Bin Al Hussein among the Jordanian Stars of Science for his contributions to his field of specialization during the World Science Forum 2017. He died after a sinking in Saudi Arabia in March 2018.

== Qualifications ==
- Bachelor of Industrial Engineering from the University of Jordan in 1999.
- MA in his specialty from the University of Leeds, UK in 2000.
- He received his Ph.D. in energy engineering from the University of Arizona in 2005.

== See also ==
- Ali Ghandour
