= The Abraaj Group =

Private equity firm based in Dubai, UAE

- Industry: Financial services
- Founded: 2002
- Founder: Arif Naqvi
- Defunct: 2018
- Fate: Liquidation
- Successors: TPG Capital, Actis Capital, Colony Capital
- Headquarters: Dubai, United Arab Emirates
- Products: Investments, private equity funds
- Total assets: c. US$13.6 billion
- Number of employees: 300

The Abraaj Group was a private equity firm operating in six continents that is currently in liquidation due to accusations of fraud. The firm was founded by Pakistani businessman Arif Naqvi and was based in Dubai, United Arab Emirates.

== History ==
The Abraaj Group was founded in 2002 by Pakistani businessman Arif Naqvi with US$3 million in capital. In April 2015, the firm closed a US$990 million Sub-Saharan Africa fund, its third in the region according to the company. Combined with US$375 million raised in August 2015 for a fund to focus on North Africa, the two funds give Abraaj just under US$1.4 billion to invest in Africa, a record sum raised in a single year.

In July 2016, the firm announced that it raised $526 million for investments in Turkey through Abraaj Turkey Fund I. Abraaj also launched its $1 billion Abraaj Growth Markets Health Fund (AGHF) to build affordable and accessible health eco-systems for middle and low-income communities in Sub Saharan Africa and South Asia.

In 2018 the firm was hit by turmoil, as it was revealed that several limited partners including the Gates Foundation were investigating its misuse of investor funds and appointed an auditor to trace the money. This led to the departure of the CFO as well as the CEO to handover his role at the fund business.

Abraaj was hit by a $188 million loss for the nine months until the end of March with Abraaj’s debts standing at $1.1 billion, including $501.4 million to unsecured creditors and $572.4 million to secured creditors. In April 2019, a third director, Sivendran "Sev" Vettivetpillai, was arrested.

Eventually, Abraaj's various funds were sold to other private equity firms. Colony Capital took over Abraaj's Latin America business. Actis Capital took over the private equity businesses in the Middle East, Africa and Asia, and TPG Capital's Rise Fund took over the firm's healthcare business.

== Business segments ==
Prior to its liquidation, the Abraaj Group invested in private equity, private credit, impact investing and real estate.

=== Private equity ===
The Abraaj Group was an investor in global growth markets and had made more than 200 investments across a range of sectors. These businesses included:

- K-Electric, the Karachi Electric Supply Company
- Acurio, a Peruvian restaurant group
- Hepsiburada, the largest e-commerce player in Turkey
- Java House Group, East Africa's largest casual dining chain
- Netlog, largest integrated logistics firm in Turkey
- Indorama Fertilizers, fertilizer manufacturer in Sub-Saharan Africa
- VUS, an education leader in Vietnam
- Big Basket, e-grocer in India
- ODM, Moroccan oncology and diagnostic services healthcare platform

In 2018, NYC-based Colony Capital acquired the management rights to Abraaj Latin America Fund II, which has assets of $545 million, the Abraaj Turkey Fund I with $526 million, the Abraaj North Africa Fund II with assets of $375 million, and the Abraaj Africa Fund III, which has assets of $990 million, and later in 2019 Colony acquired the firm’s private equity unit in Latin America.

In July 2019, after Abraaj's liquidation British private equity firm Actis took over management rights on Abraaj Private Equity Fund IV (APEF IV), a global buyout fund, and Abraaj Africa Fund III (AAF III), a fund for investment in sub-Saharan Africa.

In September 2019, Actis took over two more PE funds from Abraaj's liquidators - Abraaj North Africa Fund II and Abraaj South East Asia Fund II.

=== Private credit ===
Abraaj built a portfolio of private credit investments, diversified across sector and geography in emerging markets. According to the company, it sought to invest primarily in mezzanine debt, but could also invest in senior debt.

=== Impact investing ===
Abraaj's impact investing line of business included healthcare and clean energy.

Abraaj's US$1 billion Fund brought together healthcare technology companies, foundations, development financing institutions and institutional investors, to address and impact poor healthcare outcomes in Africa and Asia. Its healthcare investments included Care Hospitals in India and Islamabad Diagnostic Centre in Pakistan. In September 2017, the firm announced a partnership with the International Federation of Red Cross and Red Crescent Societies in Kenya to provide education, primary care interventions and more complex treatment for NCDs, communicable diseases and mother/child healthcare.

As of September 2017, the firm had invested over US$1 billion in energy, including a partnership with ENGIE to develop a wind power platform in India. In January 2017, Abraaj acquired a majority stake in Jhimpir Power, to construct a 50 MW wind project in the Jhimpir wind corridor in Southeast Pakistan. In 2015, the firm announced a partnership with Aditya Birla Group to build a 1GW scale solar energy platform in India.

In May 2019, after the forced liquidation of Abraaj, U.S. private equity firm TPG signed a definitive agreement to take over the healthcare fund.

=== Real estate ===
Abraaj’s real estate investment team invested in a range of real estate asset classes, focusing on attractive returns derived from underlying growth fundamentals such as urbanization and increased consumer spending.

=== Energy ===
Abraaj's energy team, branded as Themis, left the company in December 2017 to partner with a US investment firm. The Themis team relocated to Morocco with the objective of refocusing on the African power market.

=== Sustainability Initiatives ===
In 2012, The Abraaj Group became a signatory to the UN Global Compact and that same year, UN Secretary-General Ban Ki-moon appointed CEO Arif Naqvi to the Board of the Global Compact.

In 2014, Abraaj established the Abraaj RCA Innovation Scholarship at the Royal College of Art in London. It was the largest scholarship of its kind for postgraduate studies in the creative sector. The Abraaj Group Art Prize, the group's flagship arts patronage program, aimed at empowering potential and gives often under-represented contemporary artists the resources to further develop their talent. The prize celebrated its 10th anniversary in 2018.

In 2015, Abraaj established the Abraaj Growth Markets Grant to support projects aimed at resolving socio-economic challenges in growth markets. Nine projects were selected ranging from developing myoelectric prosthetic limbs in Kolkata to tracking crime patterns for a safer culture in Puebla.

== Latest developments ==
=== 2019 ===
During April, the US regulator Securities and Exchange Commission filed a complaint in the U.S. District Court for the Southern District of New York that Abraaj CEO, Arif Naqvi, had taken ~US$230 million from Abraaj Growth Markets Health Fund and co-mingled it with Abraaj Investment Management’s corporate funds to cover cash shortfalls for corporate expenses and other purposes unrelated to the health fund.

Founder and ex-CEO - Pakistani national, Arif Naqvi, a resident of the United Kingdom was subsequently arrested in London during April upon his arrival from Pakistan and faces extradition hearings to the US to face the SEC complaint. He was subsequently released in May on bail of £15 million, has to wear an ankle bracelet and is restricted to his London residence.

In July, the Dubai financial services regulator, Dubai Financial Services Authority fined Abraaj a record $314.6 million for deceiving investors and carrying out unauthorized activities, but it also acknowledged that it may never be able to recover the fine due to Abraaj's liquidation.

During August Abraaj ex-CEO, Arif Naqvi, was sentenced to three years of imprisonment by a UAE court, in absentia, in the misdemeanour case filed against him by Air Arabia PJSC, where he was a former Board member.

Sivendran (Sev) Vettivetpillai, a British national was arrested at his home in April 2019 and pled guilty to charges of serious financial crimes relating to Abraaj at US District Court in the Southern District of New York via video conference from the UK. An Abraaj senior employee since 2012 after his investment firm Aureos Capital was acquired by Abraaj, Sev focused on impact investing, mainly within its healthcare fund.

=== 2021 ===
During January, Senior District Judge Emma Arbuthnot of Westminster Magistrates’ Court ruled there were no bars to extradition of Arif Naqvi to the US under several articles of Britain’s 2003 Extradition Act, and ordered the case to be sent to the United Kingdom's Secretary of State for a decision as to whether he should be extradited.

During July, UAE Emirate Dubai's financial services regulator, Dubai Financial Services Authority imposed a $1.7 million fine on the former Chief Financial Officer of Abraaj, Ashish Dave, for his involvement in the failed private equity firm’s “misleading and deceptive conduct”. Ashish Dave alternated between stints at Abraaj's auditor, global accounting firm KPMG and at Abraaj as its chief financial officer, a job he held twice. At least two other members of Abraaj’s finance team in Dubai also previously worked for KPMG, including the son of chairman and chief executive Vijay Malhotra of affiliate, KPMG Lower Gulf Ltd.

During November, two units of Abraaj that are now in liquidation, filed a lawsuit in Dubai against KPMG LLP for damages of US$600 million alleging that KPMG accountants “failed to maintain independence and an appropriate attitude of professional scepticism,” and breached their duty of care when auditing the private-equity firm

Mustafa Abdel Wadood, an Egyptian and Maltese national, who was senior executive officer (SEO) of Abraaj Capital Limited (ACLD), the Dubai Financial Services Authority (DFSA) authorised unit of the Abraaj Group was fined $1.6 million by the DFSA] for breaching its rules and deceiving investors. The DFSA also banned him from conducting any financial services-related business in or from the Dubai International Financial Centre. From July 2006 to February 2018 he held various roles including managing partner, global head of private equity and board member. Mustafa is already out in the US on a $10 million bail since 2019 after having pleaded guilty, and his sentencing has been postponed by the US Attorney for the Southern District of New York, pending the outcome of an extradition request from the UK of the company’s founder, Arif Naqvi.

Judge Philippa Whipple of the UK High Court adjourned the matter of extradition of Abraaj founder, Arif Naqvi, until a similar point of law was resolved in another high-profile extradition case - that of Nirav Modi, an Indian diamond tycoon.

=== 2022 ===
During January, the Dubai financial regulator Dubai Financial Services Authority fined former CEO, Arif Naqvi, UAE Dirham 497.9 million (~US$135.6 million) and its former COO, Waqar Siddiqui, UAE Dirham 4.2 million (~US$1.2 million) over their role in the collapse of Abraaj.

During October, Waqar Siddique, a former Managing Director at the firm settled the fine of US$1.15 million imposed on him by the Dubai financial regulator, Dubai Financial Services Authority, in January for “serious failings” in respect of Abraaj.

=== 2023 ===
On 8 March 2023, former CEO Arif Naqvi lost his challenge to the extradition ordering him from London to the United States, as a UK High Court Judge refused him permission to bring a judicial review against the 2021 order. This means that the extradition order authorized in 2021 by the then UK Home Secretary Priti Patel will be executed, and Naqvi will be sent to a US prison to undergo his trial on fraud allegations by US authorities.

== Bibliography ==
- Simon Clark and Will Louch, The Key Man: The True Story of How the Global Elite Was Duped by a Capitalist Fairy, Harper Business (2021) ISBN 978-0-06-299621-3 - The story of Pakistani ex-CEO, Arif Naqvi
- Brian Brivati, Icarus: The Life and Death of the Abraaj Group, Biteback Publishing (2021), ISBN 978-1785907180
