= Hemerodromoi =

High-speed messenger in ancient Greece

Hemerodromoi (Ancient Greek: ἡμεροδρόμοι, lit. 'day-runners') or hemeroskopoi (Ancient Greek: ἡμεροσκόποι, lit. 'day-watchers') or dromokerykes (Ancient Greek: δρομοκήρυκες, lit. 'runner heralds') were specialized couriers in ancient Greece renowned for their exceptional endurance.

== Activities ==
These trained runners were employed to carry important news, often conveying information about significant events across the Greek world. Due to the absence of a postal system and the limited road network, they played a crucial role in communication, particularly in times of urgency.

They were remarkable for their ability to cover long distances in a remarkably short period of time. Their rigorous training enabled them to run for extended periods, carrying messages between cities or key locations. This capability was vital for the rapid transmission of intelligence, especially during critical moments when fast and reliable communication could significantly impact the outcome of military or political events.

In addition to their role as messengers, they also performed a form of surveillance. In times of danger, they were often stationed on elevated positions such as hills to observe important events or military movements. Upon detecting any significant developments, they would swiftly relay the information to the appropriate authorities, ensuring timely responses to emerging situations.

The terms Hemerodromoi and Hemeroscopoi were sometimes used interchangeably, emphasizing the dual role of these individuals as both messengers and watchers. The name Dromokerykes highlighted their function as "runner heralds," underscoring their speed and the importance of their role in transmitting vital information.

One famous example is Pheidippides, who is claimed to have run from the battlefield of Marathon to Athens to announce the Greek victory over the Persians.
