= Dubai Financial Services Authority =

Financial regulatory agency, Dubai

Agency overview
- Formed: 2004
- Jurisdiction: Dubai International Financial Centre
- Headquarters: Dubai, United Arab Emirates
- Agency executives: Fadel Al Ali, Chairman; Mark Steward, Chief Executive
- Website: www.dfsa.ae

The Dubai Financial Services Authority (DFSA) is the financial regulatory agency of the special economic zone, the Dubai International Financial Centre (DIFC), in Dubai, United Arab Emirates. It is distinct from the UAE's federal Capital Market Authority, whose jurisdiction covers the wider UAE outside the boundaries of the DIFC. It operates only within the special economic zone and is tasked with providing a regulatory environment of international standards.

== Profile ==
The DFSA's regulatory mandate includes asset management, banking and credit services, securities, collective investment funds, custody and trust services, commodities futures trading, Islamic finance, insurance, an international equities exchange, and an international commodities derivatives exchange. In addition to regulating financial and ancillary services, the DFSA is responsible for supervising and enforcing anti-money laundering (AML) and counter-terrorist financing (CTF) requirements applicable in the DIFC. The DFSA has also accepted a delegation of powers from the DIFC Registrar of Companies (RoC) to investigate the affairs of DIFC companies and partnerships where a material breach of DIFC Companies Law is suspected and to pursue enforcement remedies available to the Registrar. The regulator maintains a zero-tolerance policy towards financial misconduct.

As of August 2024, the number of DFSA regulated entities reached 837.

== Legal framework ==
The DFSA's ground-breaking regulatory framework is internationally recognised. Numerous accomplished experts from high-level regulatory bodies have been involved in its development.

Article 121 of the UAE Constitution enabled the Federation to create Financial Free Zones in the Emirates and, most importantly, to exclude the application of certain Federal laws in these Financial Free Zones. A number of laws created the DIFC and the necessary centre bodies, which include the DFSA. The laws set out the objectives, powers and functions of the central bodies. They also contain important exemptions and prohibitions in the DIFC.

== History ==
The agency was established in 2004 as part of the establishment of the Dubai International Financial Centre.

In 2017, the DFSA introduced the Innovation Testing Licence, a sandbox for companies to test innovative products and services within a controlled environment. By 2020, 82 companies applied and 38 were accepted into the programme.

In November 2018, Sarwa Digital Wealth became the first company to complete the Innovation Testing Licence programme and receive a full DFSA licence.

In 2021, the DFSA introduced the Investment Token regime, a framework that regulated digital assets such as utility tokens, cryptocurrencies, stable coins, etc. In November 2022, the regulator introduced the Crypto Token regime as a more advanced and updated version of crypto regulation. The Crypto Token regime also addressed such risks as anti-money laundering and terrorism finance. More amendments to the Crypto Token regime, refining and enhancing the regulatory environment for Crypto Tokens, were introduced in June 2024. Among others, the changes allowed domestic qualified investor funds to invest in unrecognized crypto (not more than 10% of GAV), reduced the application fee for token recognition from $10,000 to $5,000, and defined additional recognition criteria for stablecoins.

In 2023, the DFSA licensed and registered 117 new firms.

In 2024, the amount of fines issued by the regulator exceeded $2.5 mln.

In early 2025, the DFSA officially recognized stablecoins USDC and EURC.

In May 2025, Mark Steward, former FCA UK executive, succeeded Ian Johnston as DFSA CEO.

== Controversy ==
In 2019, it was reported that the DFSA was accused of retaliating against a whistleblower in a drug money laundering case.

== See also ==
- Securities Commission
- Economy of Dubai
- List of financial supervisory authorities by country
