= Athletics at the 1896 Summer Olympics – Men's marathon =

Men's marathon at the Games of the I Olympiad
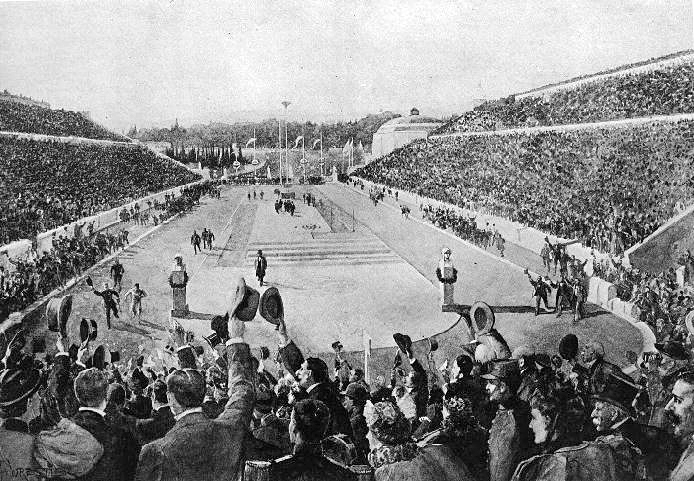
- Spyridon Louis entering the stadium at the end of the marathon
- Venue: Marathon to Athens
- Date: 10 April 1896
- Competitors: 17 from 5 nations
- Winning time: 2:58:50 OR

Medalists
1st place, gold medalist(s)		Spyridon Louis; Greece
2nd place, silver medalist(s)		Charilaos Vasilakos; Greece
3rd place, bronze medalist(s)		Gyula Kellner; Hungary

The men's marathon event was a special race held as the capstone of the athletics programme at the 1896 Summer Olympics. Seventeen athletes from five nations competed. The event was won by Spyridon Louis and was the only Greek victory in athletics.

== Background ==
Michel Bréal originated the idea of a race from the city of Marathon to Athens, taking inspiration from the legend of Pheidippides. The first such marathon race was a Greek national competition that served as a qualifier for the Olympic marathon. The race was held on 22 March 1896 and was won by Charilaos Vasilakos in 3 hours and 18 minutes. To recruit additional runners, Greece held a second qualifying race on 5 April 1896, won by Ioannis Lavrentis in a time of 3:11:27. (Note: Two qualifying races were held in Greece to select the Greek Olympic marathon runners. The first race was on March 22 of the Gregorian calendar (or alternately on March 10 of the Julian calendar). The second race was held on April 5 of the Gregorian calendar (or alternately on March 24 of the Julian calendar). Note, the source Martin 2000 is incorrect about the dates of the two qualifying races. The correct dates (noted above) are listed in Bijkerk and Young 1999, page 27, annotation 3. For further details regarding the dates see Talk:Charilaos Vasilakos.) The length of the marathon in 1896 was approximately 40 km (25 mi).

The Olympic race was held on 10 April 1896. While 25 athletes traveled to Marathon for the race, only 17 actually began the race.

At least one woman, Stamata Revithi, attempted to enter the race, but she was rejected. The official reason provided was that her entry had been submitted after the deadline. She ran the course on her own the next day, covering the distance in 5½ hours. There are also references to a woman named Melpomene attempting to run, but there is dispute as to whether this was a second woman or Revithi.

== Summary ==
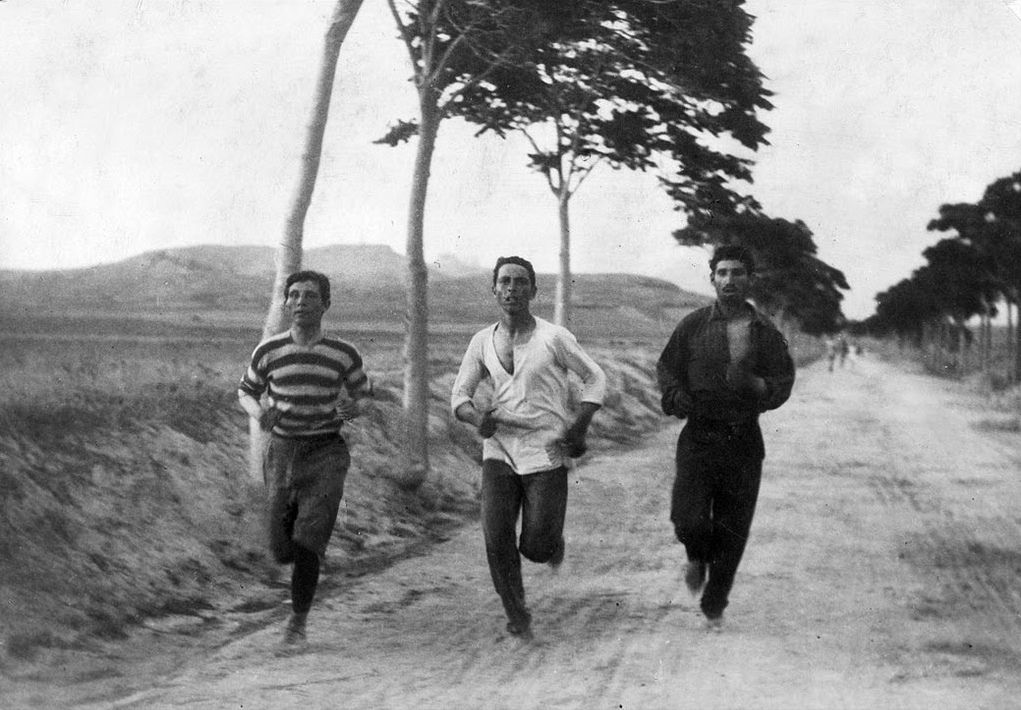
Burton Holmes' photograph titled "1896: Three athletes in training for the marathon at the Olympic Games in Athens". Charilaos Vasilakos in the middle.

As in the 1,500-metre race, Albin Lermusiaux took the lead early. Edwin Flack and Arthur Blake maintained second and third place until Blake withdrew at 23 kilometres. At 32 kilometres, Lermusiaux withdrew as well, leaving Flack in the lead as Spyridon Louis was making full use of his endurance to reach the front. Louis finished the 40-kilometre race in just under three hours.

Vasilakos finished second, followed by Spyridon Belokas, who bested a fast-finishing Gyula Kellner to seemingly complete a Greek top-three sweep. However, Kellner subsequently lodged a protest, claiming that Belokas had travelled part of the course by carriage after having supposedly left the race. The protest was upheld and Belokas was disqualified.

== Records ==
Marathon distances at the time were not standardized and records were not officially recognised. The best time in a qualifying race was that of Lavrentis.

World record	Ioannis Lavrentis (GRE)	3:11:27 (u)	n/a	n/a
Olympic record	New event	n/a	n/a	n/a

The following record was established during the competition:

Date	Event	Athlete	Nation	Distance (m)	Record
April 10	Final	Spyridon Louis	Greece	2:58:50	OR

== Schedule ==
The runners traveled to the town of Marathon on Thursday night. They assembled on the starting bridge at 2 p.m. on Friday.

Date		Time	Round
Gregorian	Julian	Time	Round
Friday, 10 April 1896	Friday, 29 March 1896	14:00	Final

== Results ==
Rank	Athlete	Nation	Time	Notes
1st place, gold medalist(s)	Spyridon Louis	Greece	2:58:50	OR
2nd place, silver medalist(s)	Charilaos Vasilakos	Greece	3:06:03	
3rd place, bronze medalist(s)	Gyula Kellner	Hungary	3:06:35	
4	Ioannis Vrettos	Greece	Unknown	
5	Eleftherios Papasymeon	Greece	Unknown	
6	Dimitrios Deligiannis	Greece	Unknown	
7	Evangelos Gerakeris	Greece	Unknown	
8	Stamatios Masouris	Greece	Unknown	
9	Sokratis Lagoudakis	Greece	Unknown	
—	Edwin Flack	Australia	DNF (37 km)	
—	Albin Lermusiaux	France	DNF (32 km)	
—	Ioannis Lavrentis	Greece	DNF (24 km)	
—	Georgios Grigoriou	Greece	DNF (24 km)	
—	Arthur Blake	United States	DNF (23 km)	
—	Ilias Kafetzis	Greece	DNF (9 km)	
—	Dimitrios Christopoulos	Greece	DNF (? km)	
—	Spyridon Belokas	Greece	~~3:06:30~~	DQ
