= Summer Olympic Games =

Major international multi-sport event

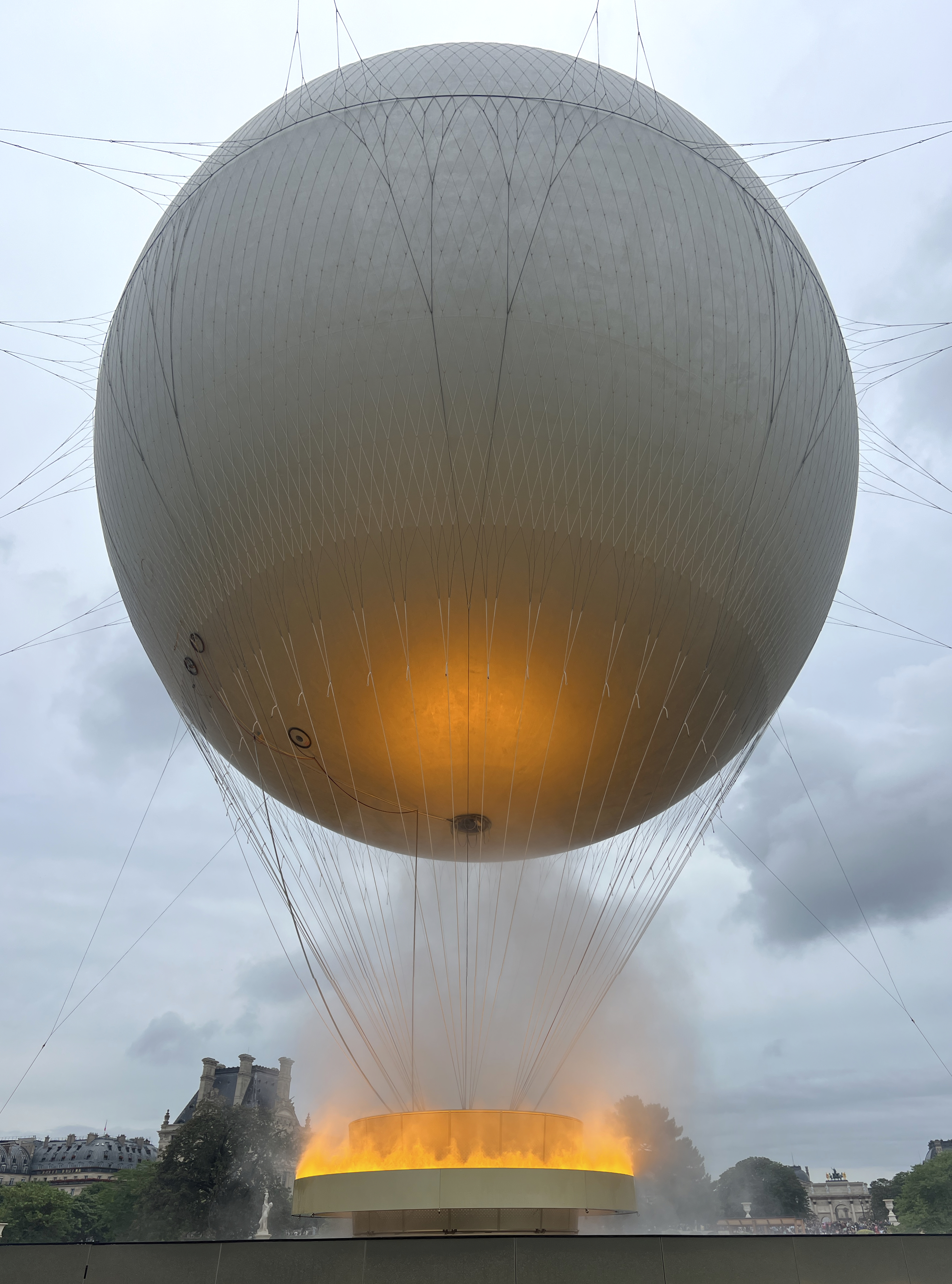
- The Olympic flame in Paris during the 2024 Summer Olympics
- 1896; 1900; 1904; 1908; 1912; 1920; 1924; 1928; 1932; 1936; 1948; 1952; 1956; 1960; 1964; 1968; 1972; 1976; 1980; 1984; 1988; 1992; 1996; 2000; 2004; 2008; 2012; 2016; 2020; 2024; 2028
- Archery; Artistic swimming; Athletics; Badminton; Baseball; Basketball; Beach volleyball; Boxing; Canoeing; Cycling; Diving; Equestrian; Field hockey; Fencing; Football; Gymnastics; Golf; Handball; Judo; Lacrosse; Modern pentathlon; Rowing; Rugby sevens; Sailing; Shooting; Skateboarding; Softball; Sport climbing; Surfing; Swimming; Table tennis; Taekwondo; Tennis; Triathlon; Volleyball; Water polo; Weightlifting; Wrestling

The Summer Olympic Games, also known as the Summer Olympics or the Games of the Olympiad, are a major international multi-sport event normally held once every four years. The inaugural Games took place in 1896 in Athens, then part of the Kingdom of Greece, and the most recent was held in 2024 in Paris, France. This was the first international multi-sport event of its kind, organised by the International Olympic Committee (IOC) founded by Pierre de Coubertin. The tradition of awarding medals began in 1904; in each Olympic event, gold medals are awarded for first place, silver medals for second place, and bronze medals for third place. The Winter Olympic Games were created out of the success of the Summer Olympic Games, which are regarded as the largest and most prestigious multi-sport international event in the world.

The Summer Olympics have increased in scope from a 42-event competition programme in 1896 with fewer than 250 male competitors from 14 nations, to 339 events in 2021 (2020 Summer Olympics) with 11,319 competitors (almost half of whom were women) from 206 nations. The Games have been held in nineteen countries over five continents: four times in the United States (1904, 1932, 1984, and 1996), three times in Great Britain (1908, 1948, and 2012) and in France (1900, 1924, and 2024), twice each in Greece (1896 and 2004), Germany (1936 and 1972), Australia (1956 and 2000), and Japan (1964 and 2020), and once each in Sweden (1912), Belgium (1920), the Netherlands (1928), Finland (1952), Italy (1960), Mexico (1968), Canada (1976), Soviet Union (1980), South Korea (1988), Spain (1992), China (2008), and Brazil (2016).

London and Paris have hosted three times, while Los Angeles, Athens, and Tokyo have each hosted twice; Los Angeles will host the Games for the third time in 2028. Only three countries have won at least one medal in every Summer Olympic Games: Australia, France and Great Britain. Only Great Britain has won at least a gold medal in every edition. The United States leads the all-time medal count for the Summer Olympics and has topped the medal table on 19 separate occasions, followed by the USSR (seven times, including the 1992 'Unified Team'), and France, Great Britain, Germany and China (once each).

The next scheduled games are the XXXIV Olympiad, to take place from 14 to 30 July 2028 in Los Angeles, California, United States.

== Hosting ==
Map of Summer Olympic Games locations – countries that have hosted one Summer Olympics are shaded green, while countries that have hosted two or more are shaded blue.

The United States has hosted the Summer Olympic Games four times: the 1904 Games in St. Louis, Missouri; the 1932 and 1984 Games in Los Angeles, California, and the 1996 Games in Atlanta, Georgia. The 2028 Games in Los Angeles will mark the fifth occasion on which the Summer Olympics have been hosted by the U.S.

In 1924, Paris became the first city to host the Summer Olympics twice, while in 2012, London became the first to host three times. Paris hosted for the third time in 2024, while Los Angeles will do so in 2028. Tokyo (1964 and 2020) and Athens (1896 and 2004, excluding 1906) have each hosted two Summer Olympic Games.

Australia, Germany, Greece and Japan have all hosted the Summer Olympics twice (with Australia hosting for the third time in 2032). Tokyo was the first city outside the predominantly English-speaking and European nations to have hosted twice; it is also the largest city ever to have hosted, having grown considerably since 1964. The other countries to have hosted the Summer Olympics are Belgium, Brazil, Canada, China, Finland, Italy, Mexico, Netherlands, South Korea, Soviet Union, Spain, and Sweden, with each of these countries having hosted on one occasion.

Asia has hosted four times: in Tokyo (1964 and 2020), Seoul (1988), and Beijing (2008).

The 2016 Games in Rio de Janeiro, Brazil, were the first Summer Olympics to be held in South America and the first that was held completely during the local "winter" season. The only two countries in the Southern Hemisphere to have hosted have been Australia (1956, 2000, and again in 2032) and Brazil (2016), with Africa having yet to host any Summer Olympics.

Stockholm, Sweden, has hosted events at two Summer Olympics, having been the sole host of the 1912 Games while hosting the equestrian events for the 1956 Summer Olympics (which quarantine regulations prevented from being held in Melbourne, Australia). Amsterdam, Netherlands, has also hosted events at two Summer Olympic Games, having been the sole host of the 1928 Games while hosting two of the sailing races at the 1920 Summer Olympics. At the 2008 Summer Olympics, Hong Kong provided the venues for the equestrian events, which took place in Sha Tin and Kwu Tung.

Hosting the Games requires and accelerates large investments in city infrastructure. The Games now play a key role in city leaders' plans to strengthen their cities' global integration and economic competitiveness.

== History ==
=== Early years ===
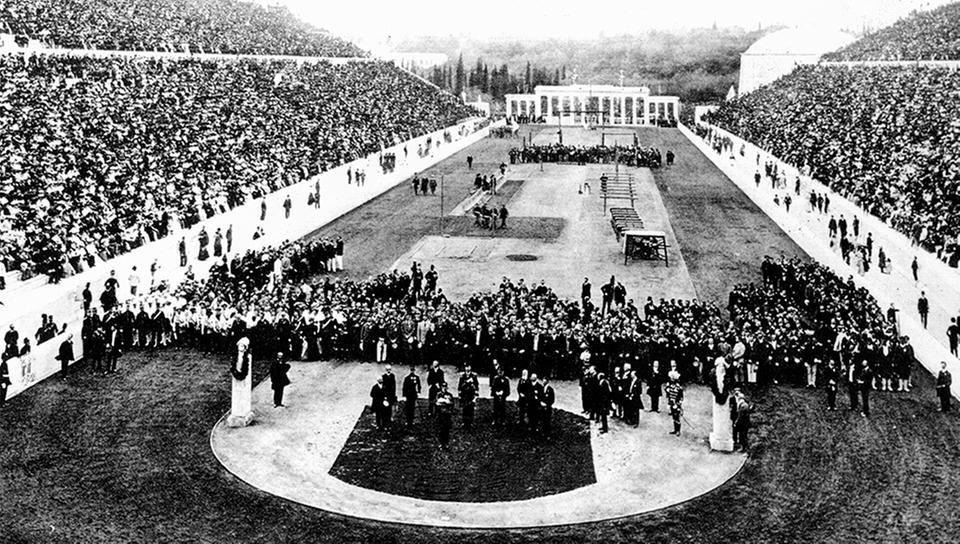
The opening ceremony of the first modern Olympic Games in the Panathenaic Stadium, Athens

The International Olympic Committee (IOC) was founded in 1894 when Pierre de Coubertin, a French pedagogue and historian, sought to promote international understanding through sporting competition. The first edition of The Olympic Games was held in Athens in 1896 and attracted just 245 competitors, of whom more than 200 were Greek, and only 14 countries were represented. Nevertheless, no international events of this magnitude had been organised before. Female athletes were not allowed to compete, though one woman, Stamata Revithi, ran the marathon course on her own, saying, "If the committee doesn't let me compete, I will go after them regardless". Women first participated officially in the 1900 Paris Games, with 22 women competing in five sports. Female participation has increased dramatically since then, with nearly half of the athletes in recent Games being women.

The 1896 Summer Olympics, officially known as the Games of the Olympiad, was an international multi-sport event which was celebrated in Athens, Greece, from 6 to 15 April 1896. It was the first Olympic Games held in the modern era. About 100,000 people attended for the opening of the games. The athletes came from 14 nations, with most coming from Greece. Although Greece had the most athletes, the U.S. finished with the most champions; 11 Americans placed first in their events vs. the 10 from Greece. Ancient Greece was the birthplace of the Olympic Games, consequently Athens was perceived to be an appropriate choice to stage the inaugural modern Games. It was unanimously chosen as the host city during a congress organised by Pierre de Coubertin in Paris, on 23 June 1894. The IOC was also established during this congress.

Despite many obstacles and setbacks, the 1896 Olympics were regarded as a great success. The Games had the largest international participation of any sporting event to that date. Panathinaiko Stadium, the first big stadium in the modern world, overflowed with the largest crowd ever to watch a sporting event. The highlight for the Greeks was the Marathon victory by their compatriot Spiridon Louis, a water carrier. He won in 2 hours, 58 minutes and 50 seconds, setting off wild celebrations at the stadium. The most successful competitor was German wrestler and gymnast Carl Schuhmann, who won four gold medals.

Greek officials and the public were enthusiastic about the experience of hosting an Olympic Games. This feeling was shared by many of the athletes, who even demanded that Athens be the permanent Olympic host city. The IOC intended for subsequent Games to be rotated to various host cities around the world. The second Olympics was held in Paris.

Four years later the 1900 Summer Olympics in Paris attracted more than four times as many athletes, including 20 women, who were allowed to officially compete for the first time, in croquet, golf, sailing, and tennis. The Games were integrated with the Paris World's Fair and lasted over five months. It has been disputed which exact events were Olympic, as some events were for professionals, some had restricted eligibility, and others lacked international competitors.

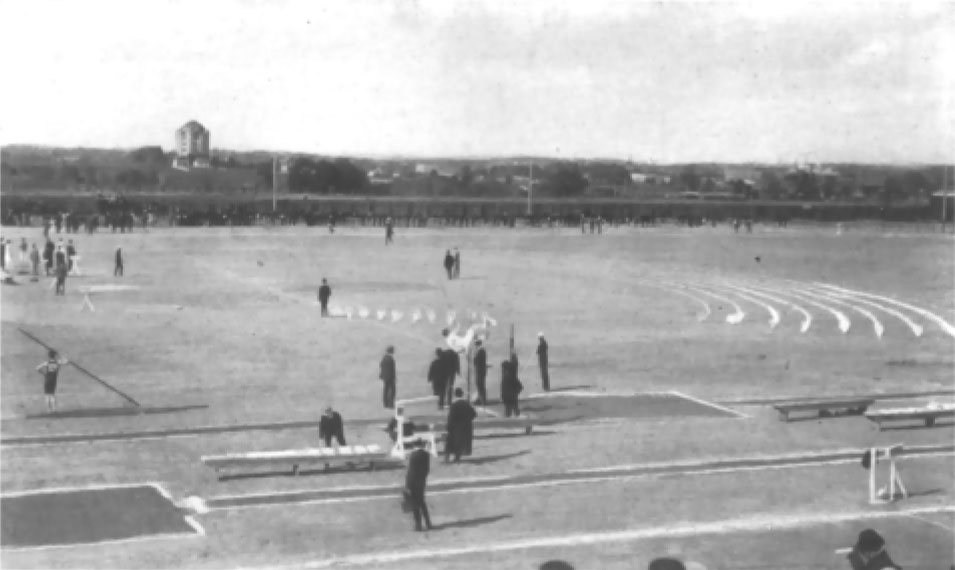
Francis Olympic Field of Washington University in St. Louis during the 1904 Summer Olympics

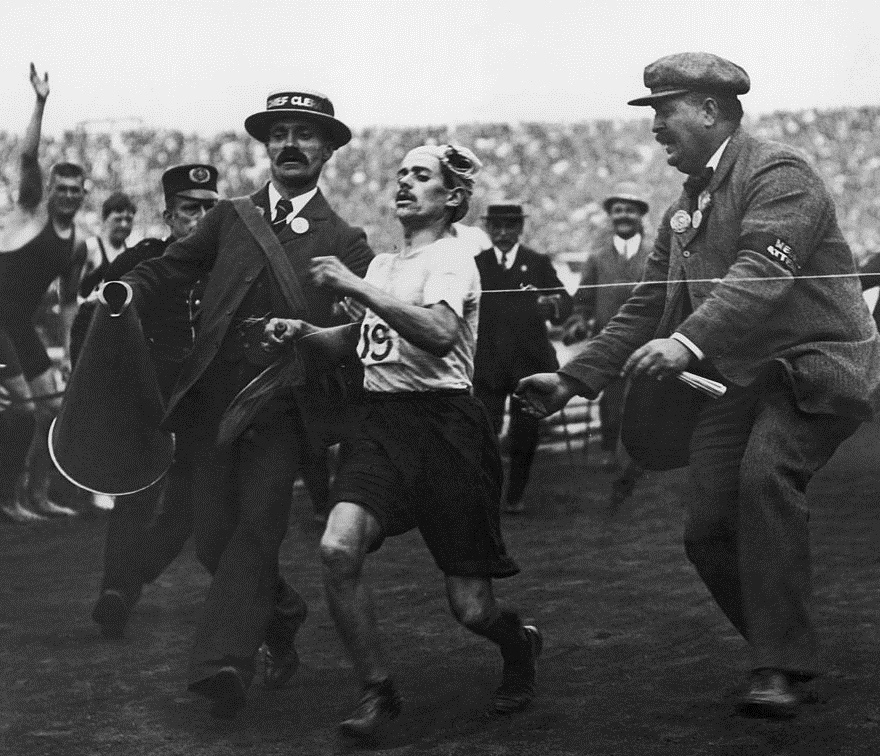
Dorando Pietri finishes the modern marathon in 1908 at the current distance.

Tensions caused by the Russo–Japanese War and the difficulty of travelling to St. Louis may have contributed to the fact that very few top-ranked athletes from outside the U.S. and Canada took part in the 1904 Games, the first Games held outside Europe. The current three-medal format of gold, silver and bronze for first, second and third place was introduced at the 1904 Olympics.

The "Second International Olympic Games in Athens", as they were called at the time, were held in 1906. The IOC does not currently recognise these games as being official Olympic Games, although many historians do and credit the 1906 games with preventing the demise of the Olympics. The 1906 Athens games were the first of an alternating series of games to be held in Athens in even non-Olympic years, but the series failed to materialise. The games were more successful than the 1900 and 1904 games, with over 850 athletes competing, and contributed positively to the success of future games.

The 1908 London Games saw numbers rise again, as well as the first running of the marathon over its now-standard distance of 42.195 km (26 miles 385 yards). The first Olympic Marathon in 1896 (a male-only race) was raced at a distance of 40 km (24 miles 85 yards). The new marathon distance was chosen to ensure that the race finished in front of the box occupied by the British royal family. Thus the marathon had been 40 km (24.9 mi) for the first games in 1896, but was subsequently varied by up to 2 km (1.2 mi) depending on local conditions such as street and stadium layout. At the six Olympic games between 1900 and 1920, the marathon was raced over six distances. The Games saw Great Britain winning 146 medals, 99 more than second-placed Americans, its best result to this day.

At the end of the 1908 marathon, the Italian runner Dorando Pietri was first to enter the stadium, but he was clearly in distress and collapsed of exhaustion before he could complete the event. He was helped over the finish line by concerned race officials and later disqualified for that. As compensation for the missing medal, Queen Alexandra gave Pietri a gilded silver cup. Arthur Conan Doyle wrote a special report about the race in the Daily Mail.

The Games continued to grow, attracting 2,504 competitors, to Stockholm in 1912, including the great all-rounder Jim Thorpe, who won both the decathlon and pentathlon. Thorpe had previously played a few games of baseball for a fee, and saw his medals stripped for this 'breach' of amateurism after complaints from Avery Brundage. They were reinstated in 1983, 30 years after his death. The Games at Stockholm were the first to fulfil Pierre de Coubertin's original idea. For the first time since the Games started in 1896, all five inhabited continents were represented with athletes competing in the same stadium.

The scheduled 1916 Summer Olympics were to be held in Berlin, cancelled following the onset of World War I.

=== Interwar era ===
The 1920 Antwerp Games in war-ravaged Belgium were a subdued affair, but again drew a record number of competitors. This record only stood until 1924, when the Paris Games involved 3,000 competitors, the greatest of whom was Finnish runner Paavo Nurmi. The "Flying Finn" won three team gold medals and the individual 1,500- and 5,000-metre runs, the latter two on the same day.

Paris hosted the 1924 Games, becoming the first two-time host city. The Games were the last held under the IOC presidency of Pierre de Coubertin, father of the modern Olympics, and saw the introduction of the Olympic motto Citius, Altius, Fortius, the Olympic Village, and the Winter Olympics as an "International Winter Sports Week."

The 1928 Amsterdam Games was notable for being the first games which allowed females to compete at track & field athletics, and benefited greatly from the general prosperity of the times alongside the first appearance of sponsorship of the games, from the Coca-Cola Company. The 1928 games saw the introduction of a standard medal design with the IOC, choosing Giuseppe Cassioli's depiction of Greek goddess Nike with a winner being carried by a crowd of people. This design was used up until 1972.

The 1932 Los Angeles Games featured an Olympic Village and victory podium for the first time.

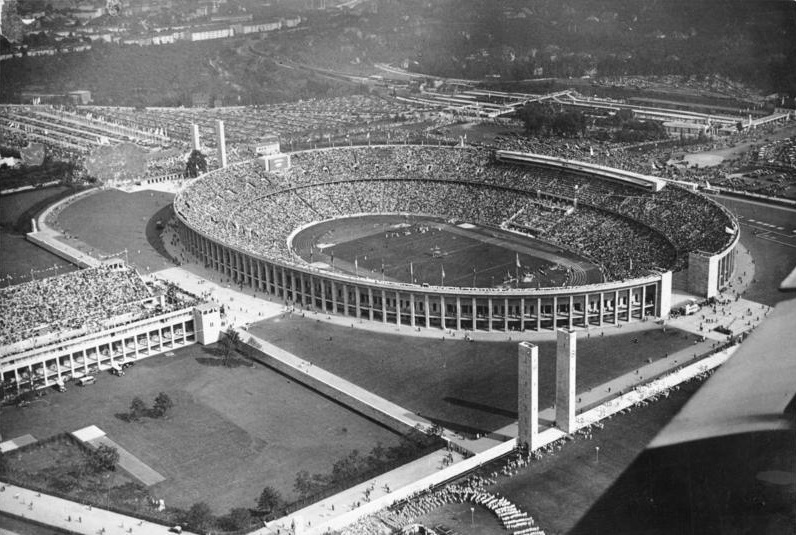
Olympiastadion in Berlin, during the 1936 Games

The 1936 Berlin Games were seen by the German government as a golden opportunity to promote their ideology. The ruling Nazi Party commissioned film-maker Leni Riefenstahl to film the games. The result, Olympia, was widely considered to be a masterpiece, despite the infusion of Adolf Hitler's theories of Aryan racial superiority. Individually, African-American sprinter and long jumper Jesse Owens won four gold medals, while the host nation won the most gold and overall medals. The 1936 Berlin Games also saw the introduction of the Torch Relay.

Due to World War II, the 1940 Games (scheduled to be held in Tokyo and temporarily relocated to Helsinki upon the outbreak of the war) were cancelled. The 1944 Games were set to be held in London but were also cancelled; instead, London hosted the first games after the end of the war, in 1948.

=== After World War II ===
The first post-war Games were held in 1948 in London, with both Germany and Japan excluded. Dutch sprinter Fanny Blankers-Koen won four gold medals on the track, emulating Owens' achievement in Berlin.

At the 1952 Helsinki Games, the USSR team competed for the first time and quickly emerged as one of the dominant teams, finishing second in the number of gold and overall medals won. Their immediate success might be explained by the advent of the state-sponsored "full-time amateur athlete". The USSR entered teams of athletes who were all nominally students, soldiers, or working in a profession, but many of whom were in reality paid by the state to train on a full-time basis, hence violating amateur rules. Finland made a legend of an amiable Czechoslovak Army lieutenant named Emil Zátopek, who was intent on improving on his single gold and silver medals from 1948. Having first won both the 10,000- and 5,000-metre races, he also entered the marathon, despite having never previously raced at that distance. Pacing himself by chatting with the other race leaders, Zátopek led from about halfway, slowly dropping the remaining contenders to win by two and a half minutes, and completed a trio of wins.

The 1956 Melbourne Games, the first in the Southern Hemisphere, were largely successful, with the exception of a water polo match between Hungary and the Soviet Union, which ended in a pitched battle between the teams on account of the Soviet invasion of Hungary. The equestrian events were held in Stockholm because of a foot-and-mouth disease outbreak in Britain at the time and the strict quarantine laws of Australia.

At the 1960 Rome Games, a young light-heavyweight boxer named Cassius Clay, later known as Muhammad Ali, arrived on the scene. Ali would later throw his gold medal away in disgust after being refused service in a whites-only restaurant in his home town of Louisville, Kentucky. He was awarded a new medal 36 years later at the 1996 Olympics in Atlanta. Other notable performers in 1960 included Wilma Rudolph, a gold medal list in the 100 metres, 200 metres, and 4 × 100 metres relay events.

The 1964 Tokyo Games were the first to be held in Asia and to be broadcast worldwide on television, enabled by the recent advent of communication satellites. These Games marked a turning point in the global visibility and popularity of the Olympics and are credited for heralding the modern age of telecommunications. Judo debuted as an official sport, and Dutch judoka Anton Geesink caused a stir when he won the final of the open weight division, defeating Akio Kaminaga in front of his home crowd.

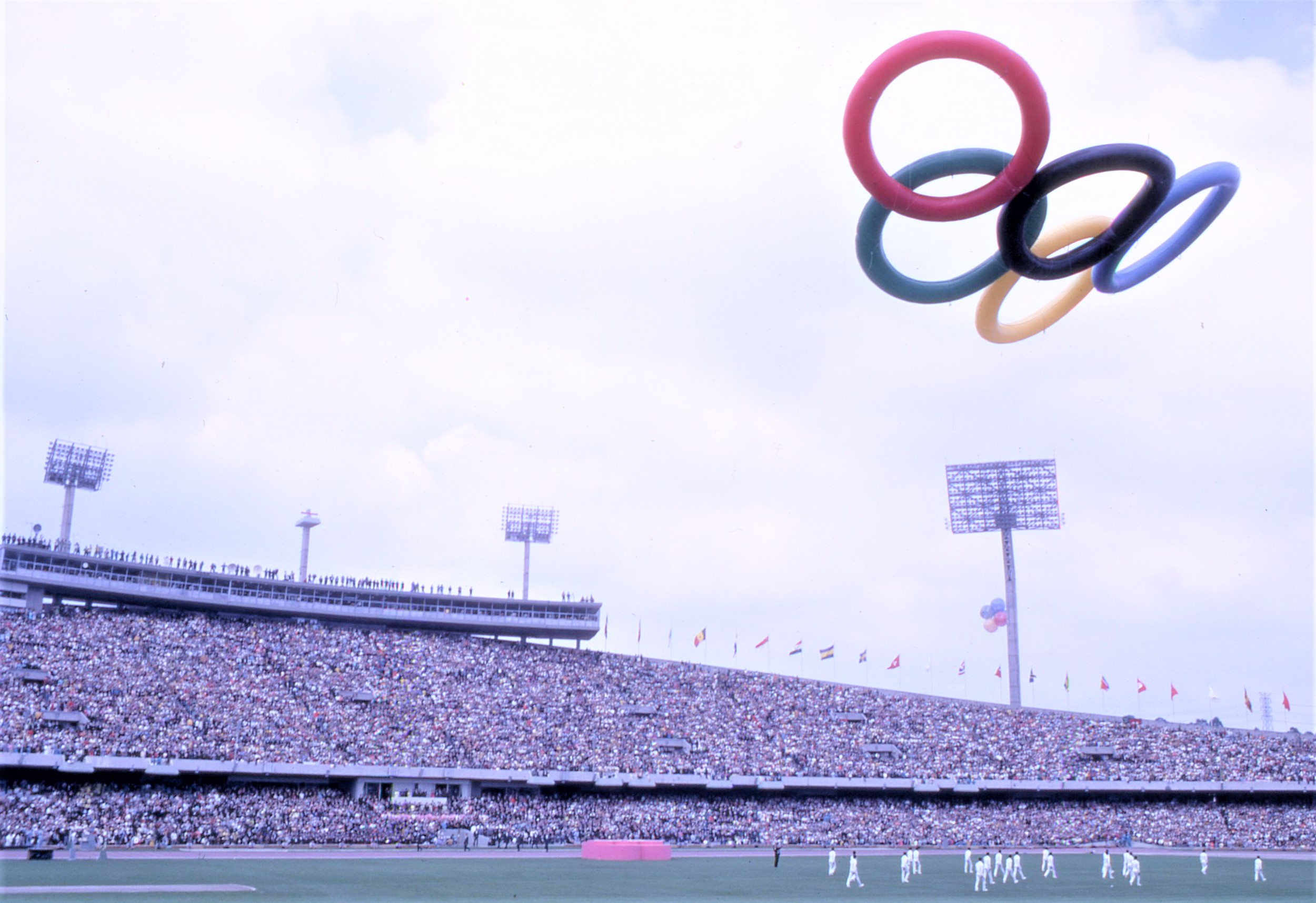
Opening ceremony for the 1968 Games in Mexico City, the first held in Latin America

Performances at the 1968 Games in Mexico City were affected by the altitude of the host city. These Games introduced the now-universal Fosbury flop, a technique which won American high jumper Dick Fosbury the gold medal. In the medal award ceremony for the men's 200-metre race, black American athletes Tommie Smith (gold medal winner) and John Carlos (bronze medal winner) took a stand for civil rights by raising their black-gloved fists and wearing black socks in lieu of shoes. The two athletes were subsequently expelled from the Games by the IOC. Věra Čáslavská, in protest against the 1968 Soviet-led invasion of Czechoslovakia, and the controversial decision by the judges on the balance beam and floor, turned her head down and away from the Soviet flag while the national anthem was played during the medal ceremony. She returned home as a heroine of the Czechoslovak people but was made an outcast by the Soviet-dominated government.

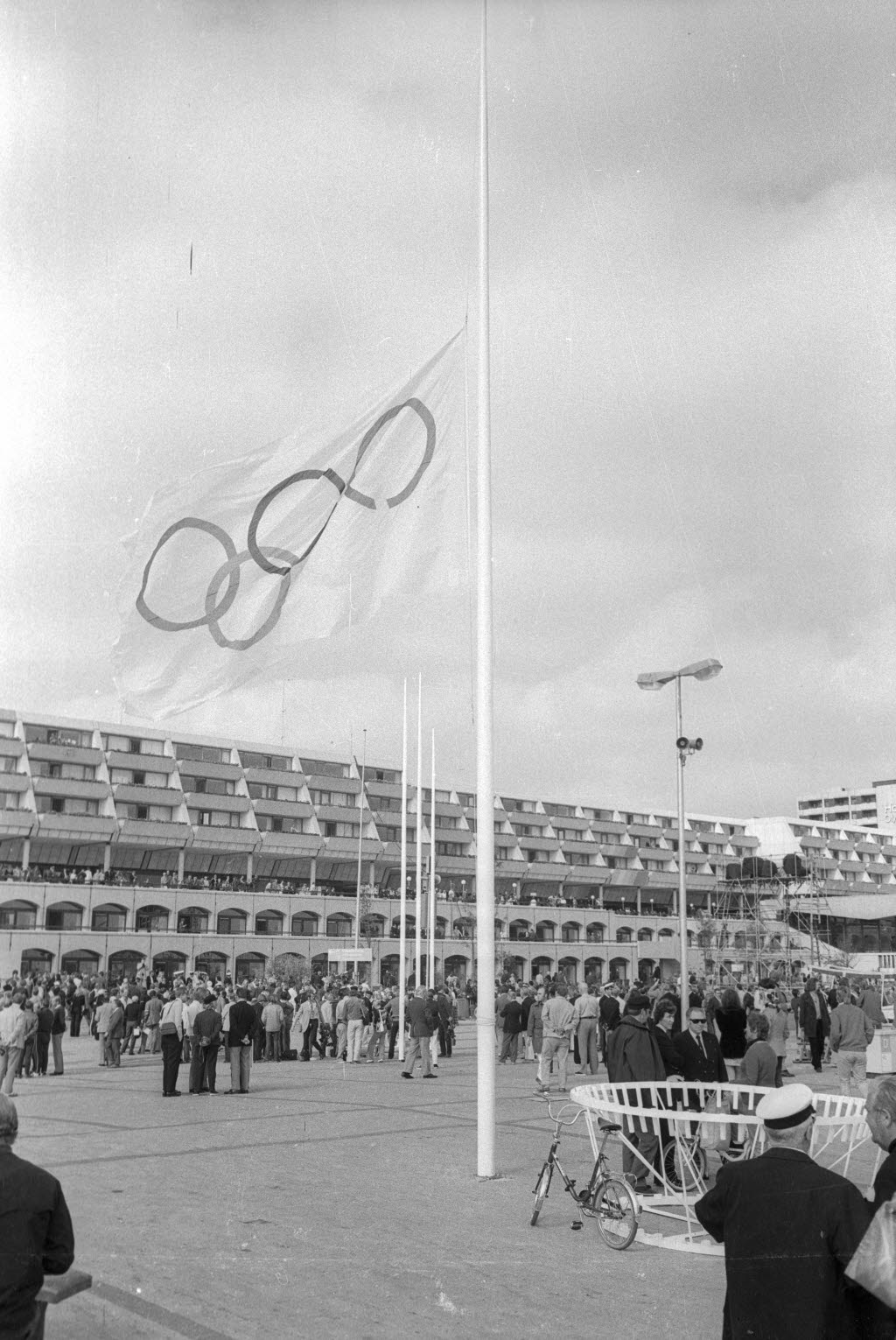
Olympic flag at halfmast in Kiel (host city of the sailing events), after the Munich massacre at 1972 Games

Politics again intervened at the 1972 Games in Munich, but this time with lethal consequences. A Palestinian terrorist group named Black September invaded the Olympic village and broke into the apartment of the Israeli delegation. They killed two Israelis and held nine others as hostages, demanding that Israel release numerous prisoners. When the Israeli government refused the terrorists' demands, the situation developed into a tense stand-off while negotiations continued. Eventually, the captors, still holding their hostages, were offered safe passage and taken to an airport, where they were ambushed by German security forces. In the ensuing firefight, 15 people were killed, including the nine captive Israeli athletes and five of the terrorists. After much debate, the decision was taken to continue the Games, but the proceedings were understandably dominated by these events. Some memorable athletic achievements did occur during these Games, notably the winning of a then-record seven gold medals by United States swimmer Mark Spitz, Finland's Lasse Virén taking back-to-back gold medals in the 5,000 metres and 10,000 metres, and the winning of three gold medals by Soviet gymnastic star Olga Korbut, who achieved a historic backflip off the high bar. In the final of the men's basketball, the United States lost to the Soviet Union in what is widely considered as the most controversial game in international basketball history. In a close-fought match, the U.S. team appeared to have won by a score of 50–49. However, the final three seconds of the game were replayed three times by judges until the Soviet team came out on top and claimed a 51–50 victory. Ultimately the U.S. team refused to accept their silver medals.

There was no such tragedy at the 1976 Montreal Games, but bad planning and fraud led to the cost of these Games far exceeding the budget. Costing $1.5 billion (equivalent to $7.92 billion in 2025), the 1976 Summer Games were the most expensive in Olympic history (until the 2014 Winter Olympics) and it seemed, for a time, that the Olympics might no longer be a viable financial proposition. In retrospect, it is believed that contractors (suspected of being members of the Montreal Mafia) skimmed large sums of money from all levels of contracts while also profiting from the substitution of cheaper building materials of lesser quality, which may have contributed to the delays, poor construction, and excessive costs. In 1988, one such contractor, Giuseppe Zappia "was cleared of fraud charges that resulted from his work on Olympic facilities after two key witnesses died before testifying at his trial". The 1976 Games were boycotted by many African nations as a protest against a recent tour of apartheid-run South Africa by the New Zealand national rugby union team. Romanian gymnast Nadia Comăneci made history when she won the women's individual all-around gold medal with two of four possible perfect scores. She won two other individual events, with two perfect scores in the balance beam and all perfect scores in the uneven bars. Lasse Virén repeated his double gold in the 5,000 and 10,000 metres, making him the first athlete to ever win the distance double twice.

=== End of the 20th century ===
Following the Soviet Union's 1979 invasion of Afghanistan, 66 nations, including the United States, Canada, West Germany, and Japan, boycotted the 1980 Games held in Moscow. Eighty nations were represented at the Moscow Games – the smallest number since 1956. The boycott contributed to the 1980 Games being a less publicised and less competitive affair, which was dominated by the host country.

According to British journalist Andrew Jennings, a KGB colonel stated that the agency's officers had posed as anti-doping authorities from the IOC to undermine doping tests and that Soviet athletes were "rescued with [these] tremendous efforts". On the topic of the 1980 Summer Olympics, an Australian study in 1989 said "There is hardly a medal winner at the Moscow Games, certainly not a gold medal winner, who is not on one sort of drug or another: usually several kinds. The Moscow Games might as well have been called the Chemists' Games."

Documents obtained in 2016 revealed the Soviet Union's plans for a statewide doping system in track and field in preparation for the 1984 Summer Olympics in Los Angeles. Dated prior to the country's decision to boycott the Games, the document detailed the existing steroids operations of the programme, along with suggestions for further enhancements. The communication, directed to the Soviet Union's head of track and field, was prepared by Dr. Sergei Portugalov of the Institute for Physical Culture. Portugalov was also one of the main figures involved in the implementation of the Russian doping programme prior to the 2016 Summer Olympics.

In 1984, the Soviet Union and 13 Soviet allies retaliated by boycotting the 1984 Summer Olympics in Los Angeles. Romania and Yugoslavia notably are the only two countries from the Eastern Bloc that did attend the 1984 Olympics. These games were perhaps the first games of a new era to make a profit. Although a boycott led by the Soviet Union depleted the field in certain sports, 140 National Olympic Committees took part, which was a record at the time. The Games were also the first time mainland China (People's Republic) participated.

The 1988 Games, in Seoul, was very well planned, but the games were tainted when many of the athletes, most notably men's 100 metres winner Ben Johnson, failed mandatory drug tests. Despite splendid drug-free performances by many individuals, the number of people who failed screenings for performance-enhancing chemicals overshadowed the games.

The 1992 Barcelona Games featured the admittance of players from one of the North American top leagues, the NBA, exemplified by, but not limited to, U.S. basketball's "Dream Team". The 1992 games also saw the reintroduction to the Games of several smaller European states which had been annexed into the Soviet Union during World War II. At these games, gymnast Vitaly Scherbo set an inaugural medal record of five individual gold medals at a Summer Olympics and equalled the inaugural record set by Eric Heiden at the 1980 Winter Olympics.

By then the process of choosing a location for the Games had become a commercial concern; there were widespread allegations of corruption potentially affecting the IOC's decision process.

At the Atlanta 1996 Summer Olympics, one highlight was 200 metres runner Michael Johnson smashing the world record in front of a home crowd. Canadians savoured Donovan Bailey recording a gold medal run in the 100-metre dash. There were also emotional scenes, such as when Muhammad Ali, clearly affected by Parkinson's disease, lit the Olympic torch and received a replacement medal for the one he had discarded in 1960. There were 8.3 million tickets sold for events at this Olympics, a record broken only in 2024. The atmosphere at the Games was marred, however, when a bomb exploded during the celebration in Centennial Olympic Park. In June 2003, the principal suspect in this bombing, Eric Robert Rudolph, was arrested.

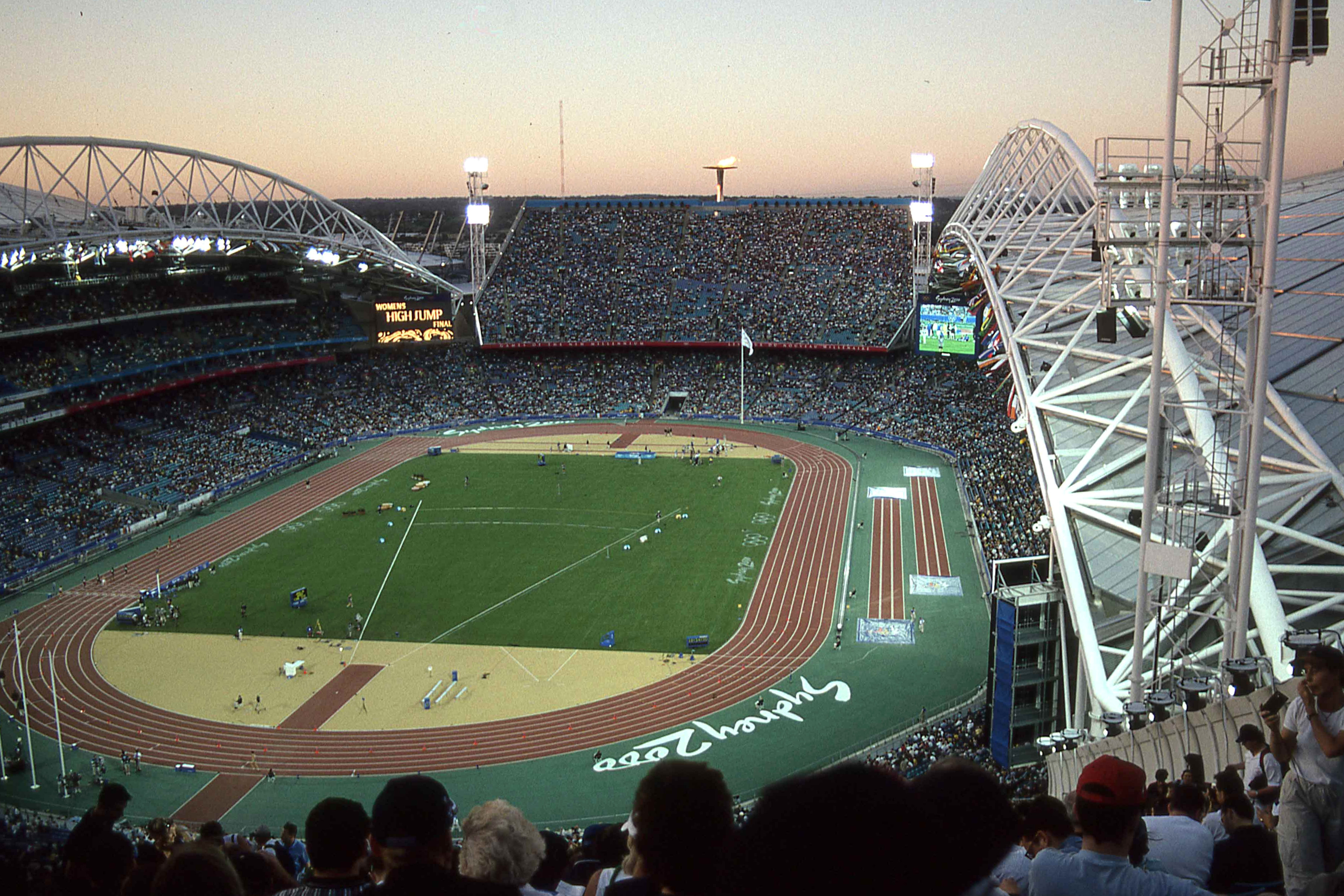
The 2000 Summer Olympics in Sydney, Australia, were known as the "Games of the New Millennium".

The 2000 Summer Olympics, held in Sydney, Australia, showcased individual performances by local favourites Ian Thorpe in the pool and Cathy Freeman, an Indigenous Australian whose triumph in the 400 metres united a packed stadium. Briton Steve Redgrave won a rowing gold medal in an unprecedented fifth consecutive Olympics, and Eric "the Eel" Moussambani, a swimmer from Equatorial Guinea, received wide media coverage when he completed the 100-metre freestyle swim in by far the slowest time in Olympic history. He nevertheless won the heat as both his opponents had been disqualified for false starts. His female compatriot Paula Barila Bolopa also received media attention for her record-slow and struggling but courageous performance. The Sydney Games also saw the first appearance of a joint North and South Korean contingent at the opening ceremonies, though they competed in all events as different teams. Controversy occurred in the women's artistic gymnastics when the vaulting horse was set to the wrong height during the all-around competition.

=== Start of the 21st century ===
In 2004, the Olympic Games returned to their birthplace in Athens, Greece. At least $7.2 billion was spent on the 2004 Games, including $1.5 billion on security. Michael Phelps won his first Olympic medals, tallying six gold and two bronze medals. Pyrros Dimas, winning a bronze medal, became the most decorated weightlifter of all time with four Olympic medals, three gold and one bronze. Although unfounded reports of potential terrorism drove crowds away from the preliminary competitions at the first weekend of the Olympics (14–15 August 2004), attendance picked up as the Games progressed. A third of the tickets failed to sell, but ticket sales still topped figures from the Seoul and Barcelona Olympics (1988 and 1992). IOC President Jacques Rogge characterised Greece's organisation as outstanding and its security precautions as flawless. All 202 NOCs participated at the Athens Games with over 11,000 participants.

The 2008 Summer Olympics was held in Beijing, People's Republic of China. Several new events were held, including the new discipline of BMX for both men and women. Women competed in the steeplechase for the first time. The fencing programme was expanded to include all six events for both men and women; previously, women had not been able to compete in team foil or sabre events, although women's team épée and men's team foil were dropped for these Games. Marathon swimming events were added, over the distance of 10 km (6.2 mi). Also, the doubles events in table tennis were replaced by team events. American swimmer Michael Phelps set a record for gold medals at a single Games with eight, and tied the record of most gold medals by a single competitor previously held by both Eric Heiden and Vitaly Scherbo. Another notable star of the Games was Jamaican sprinter Usain Bolt, who became the first male athlete ever to set world records in the finals of both the 100 and 200 metres in the same Games. Equestrian events were held in Hong Kong.

London held the 2012 Summer Olympics, becoming the first city to host the Olympic Games three times. In his closing address, Jacques Rogge described the Games as "Happy and glorious". The host nation won 29 gold medals, the best haul for Great Britain since the 1908 Games in London. The United States returned to the top of the medal table after China dominated in 2008. The IOC had removed baseball and softball from the 2012 programme. The London Games were successful on a commercial level because they were the first in history to completely sell out every ticket, with as many as one million applications for 40,000 tickets for both the Opening Ceremony and the 100m Men's Sprint Final. Such was the demand for tickets to all levels of each event that there was controversy over seats being set aside for sponsors and National Delegations which went unused in the early days. A system of reallocation was put in place so the empty seats were filled throughout the Games.

=== Recent Games ===
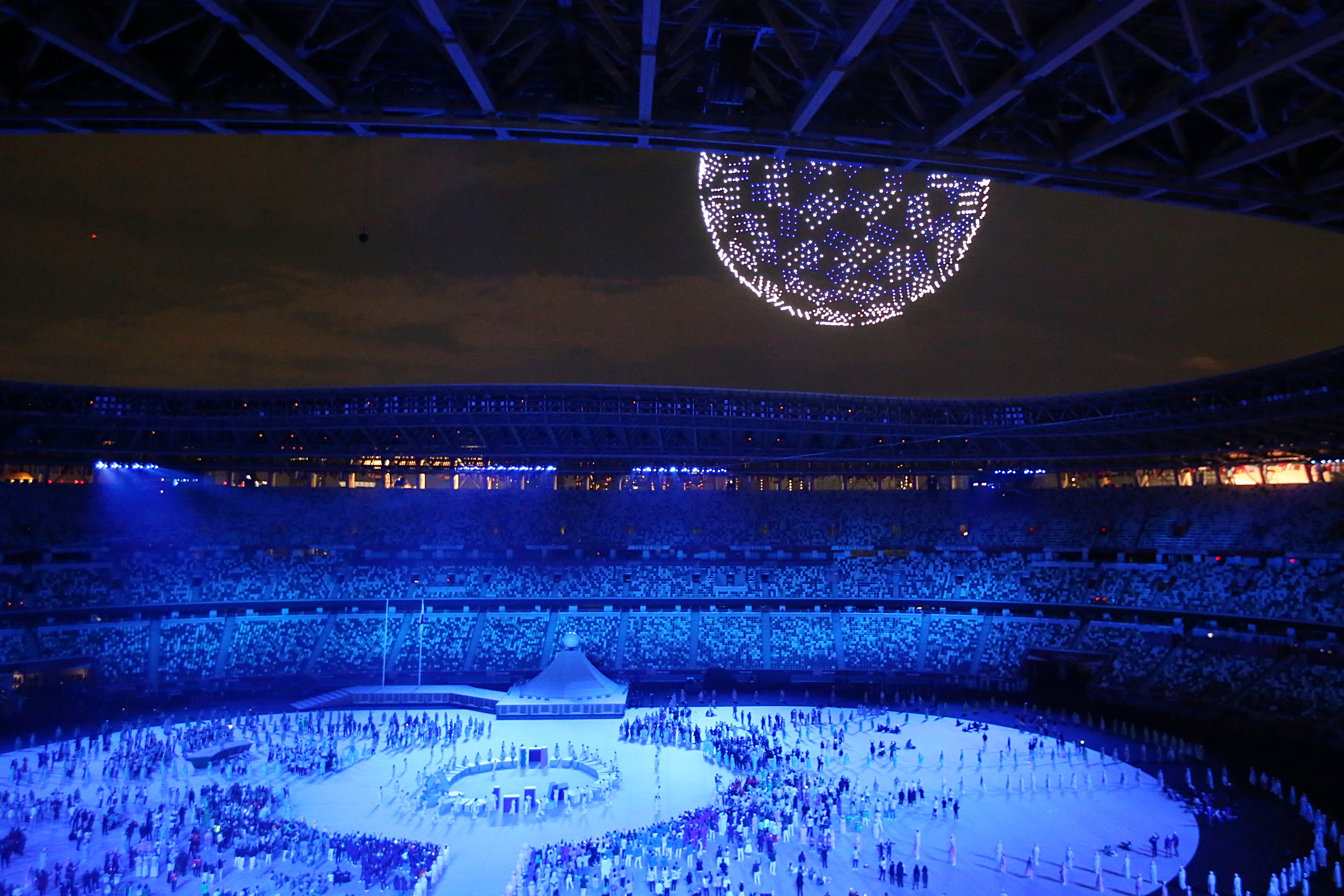
The 2020 Summer Olympics in Tokyo, Japan, had few attendees as a result of excluding public spectators amid the COVID-19 pandemic.

Rio de Janeiro in Brazil hosted the 2016 Summer Olympics, becoming the first South American city to host the Olympics, the second Olympic host city in Latin America, after Mexico City in 1968, as well as the third city in the Southern Hemisphere to host the Olympics after Melbourne, Australia, in 1956 and Sydney, Australia, in 2000. The preparation for these Games was overshadowed by controversies, including political instability and an economic crisis in the host country, health and safety concerns surrounding the Zika virus, and significant pollution in the Guanabara Bay. However, these concerns were superseded by a state-sponsored doping scandal involving Russian athletes at the Winter Olympics held two years earlier, which affected the participation of its athletes in these Games.

The 2020 Summer Olympics were originally scheduled to take place from 24 July to 9 August 2020 in Tokyo, Japan. The city was the fifth in history to host the Games twice and the first Asian city to have this title. Due to the COVID-19 pandemic, the then-Japanese Prime Minister Shinzo Abe, the IOC and the Tokyo Organising Committee announced that the 2020 Games were to be delayed until 2021, marking the first time that the Olympic Games have been postponed. This was the first time since 1900 that the games were not held in a leap year, and were instead hosted in a non-leap year. Unlike previous Olympics, these Games took place without spectators because of concerns over COVID-19 and a state of emergency imposed in the host city. Nevertheless, the Tokyo 2020 Olympic Games featured many memorable moments and feats of technical excellence. One star of the Games, U.S. gymnast Simone Biles, gracefully bowed out to focus on her mental health, but later returned to claim an individual bronze medal. Norway's Karsten Warholm smashed his own world record in the 400m hurdles.

The 2024 Summer Olympics were held in Paris, France, making it the second city after London to host the Summer Olympics three times (the other times being 1900 and 1924, marking a centenary since the latter). This is the first of any Olympic Games after the pandemic to allow spectators to attend. In a first, the opening ceremonies were staged outside the main stadium with the athletes parading on boats along the River Seine. Following this, the open water swimming competitions also occurred in the Seine. Paris 2024 was the first Olympics in history to reach full gender parity on the field of play, with equal numbers of male and female athletes.

=== Future Games ===
The 2028 Summer Olympics will be held in Los Angeles, California, United States, making it the third city (after Paris (1900, 1924, 2024) and London (1908, 1948, 2012)) to host the Games three times (the other times being 1932 and 1984), with the U.S. hosting the Summer Olympics for the fifth time.

The 2032 Summer Olympics will be held in Brisbane, Australia, which is the third city in Australia to host the Games and the fourth south of the equator.

== Sports ==
As of 2024 there have been a total of 44 sports, spanning 65 disciplines, included in the Summer Olympic programme at one point or another in the history of the Games. The schedule consisted of 32 sports for the recent Summer Olympics (2024), with 36 sports planned for the next Summer Olympics (2028) where two sports will make their debuts (flag football and squash) and a further two disciplines (coastal rowing and lacrosse sixes) will be introduced. In addition, figure skating and ice hockey were initially part of the Summer Olympic programme (figure skating in 1908 and 1920 and ice hockey in 1920) before moving to the Winter Olympics.

The various Olympic Sports federations are grouped under a common umbrella association, called the Association of Summer Olympic International Federations (ASOIF). In the table below, the sports of aquatics, baseball and softball, basketball, rugby and volleyball have been separated into their disciplines.

Current sport No longer included

Sport	Years
3x3 basketball	Since 2020
Archery	1900–1908, 1920, since 1972
Artistic swimming	Since 1984
Athletics	All
Badminton	Since 1992
Baseball	1992–2008, 2020, 2028
Basketball	Since 1936
Basque pelota	1900
Beach volleyball	Since 1996
Breaking	2024
Boxing	1904, 1908, since 1920
Canoeing	Since 1936
Cricket	1900, 2028
Croquet	1900
Cycling	All
Diving	Since 1904
Equestrian	1900, since 1912
Fencing	All
Field hockey	1908, 1920, since 1928
Flag football	2028
Football	1900–1928, since 1936
Golf	1900, 1904, since 2016
Gymnastics	All
Handball	1936, since 1972
Jeu de paume	1908
Judo	1964, since 1972
Karate	2020
Lacrosse	1904, 1908, 2028
Marathon swimming	Since 2008
Modern pentathlon	Since 1912
Polo	1900, 1908, 1920, 1924, 1936
Rackets	1908
Roque	1904
Rowing	Since 1900
Rugby union	1900, 1908, 1920, 1924
Rugby sevens	Since 2016
Sailing	1900, since 1908
Shooting	1896, 1900, 1908–1924, since 1932
Skateboarding	Since 2020
Softball	1996–2008, 2020, 2028
Sport climbing	Since 2020
Squash	2028
Surfing	Since 2020
Swimming	All
Table tennis	Since 1988
Taekwondo	Since 2000
Tennis	1896–1924, since 1988
Triathlon	Since 2000
Tug of war	1900–1920
Volleyball	Since 1964
Water motorsports	1908
Water polo	Since 1900
Weightlifting	1896, 1904, since 1920
Wrestling	1896, since 1904

=== Qualification ===
Qualification rules for each of the Olympic sports are set by the International Sports Federation (IF) that governs that sport's international competition.

For individual sports, competitors typically qualify by attaining a certain place in a major international event or on the IF's ranking list. There is a general rule that a maximum of three individual athletes may represent each nation per competition. National Olympic Committees (NOCs) may enter a limited number of qualified competitors in each event, and the NOC decides which qualified competitors to select as representatives in each event if more have attained the benchmark than can be entered.

Nations most often qualify teams for team sports through continental qualifying tournaments, in which each continental association is given a certain number of spots in the Olympic tournament. Each nation may be represented by no more than one team per competition; a team consists of just two people in some sports.

Some National Olympic Committees, whose nations are underrepresented after qualifications, may be granted wild card quotas, which are termed Universality Places, in some eligible sports.

=== Popularity of Olympic sports ===
The IOC divides Summer Olympic sports into five categories (A – E) based on popularity, gauged by six criteria: television viewing figures (40%), internet popularity (20%), public surveys (15%), ticket requests (10%), press coverage (10%), and number of national federations (5%). The category of a sport determines the share of Olympic revenue received by that sport's International Federation. Sports that were new to the 2016 Olympics (rugby and golf) have been placed in Category E.

The current categories are:

Cat.	No.	Sport
A	3	athletics, aquatics,^{[a]} gymnastics
B	5	basketball, cycling, football, tennis, volleyball
C	8	archery, badminton, boxing, judo, rowing, shooting, table tennis, weightlifting
D	9	canoe/kayaking, equestrian, fencing, handball, field hockey, sailing, taekwondo, triathlon, wrestling
E	3	modern pentathlon, golf, rugby
F	6	baseball/softball, karate, skateboarding, sport climbing, surfing

^{a} Aquatics encompasses the disciplines of artistic swimming, diving, marathon swimming, swimming, and water polo.

== All-time medal table ==
The table below uses official data provided by the IOC.

Defunct nation

status after the 2024 Summer Olympics

No.	Nation	Gold	Silver	Bronze	Total	Games
1	United States	1105	879	780	2764	29
2	Soviet Union	395	319	296	1010	9
3	China	303	226	198	727	12
4	Great Britain	298	340	343	981	30
5	France	239	277	299	815	29
6	Italy	229	201	228	658	29
7	Germany	213	220	255	688	18
8	Japan	189	162	191	542	24
9	Hungary	187	161	182	530	28
10	Australia	182	192	226	600	28
11	East Germany	153	129	127	409	5
12	Sweden	151	181	182	514	28
13	Russia	147	126	150	423	6
14	Netherlands	110	112	134	356	28
15	South Korea	109	100	111	320	19
16	Finland	101	85	119	305	27
17	Romania	93	101	123	317	23
18	Cuba	86	70	88	244	22
19	Canada	80	117	156	353	28
20	Poland	73	93	142	308	23

=== Medal leaders by year ===
Summer Olympics medal table leaders by year
- 1896: United States
- 1900: France
- 1904: United States
- 1908: Great Britain
- 1912: United States
- 1920: United States
- 1924: United States
- 1928: United States
- 1932: United States
- 1936: Germany
- 1948: United States
- 1952: United States
- 1956: Soviet Union
- 1960: Soviet Union
- 1964: United States
- 1968: United States
- 1972: Soviet Union
- 1976: Soviet Union
- 1980: Soviet Union
- 1984: United States
- 1988: Soviet Union
- 1992: Unified Team
- 1996: United States
- 2000: United States
- 2004: United States
- 2008: China
- 2012: United States
- 2016: United States
- 2020: United States
- 2024: United States

Number of occurrences

Rank	Country	Number of games
1	United States	19 times
2	Soviet Union	6 times
3	China	1 time
3	France	1 time
3	Great Britain	1 time
3	Germany	1 time
3	Unified Team	1 time

== List of Summer Olympic Games ==
The IOC has never decided which events of the early Games were "Olympic" and which were not. The founder of the modern Olympics, Pierre de Coubertin, ceded that determination to the organisers of those Games.

Olympiad	No.	Host city	Host country	Dates / Opened by	Sports (Disciplines)	Competitors			Events	Nations	Top nation
Olympiad	No.	Host city	Host country	Dates / Opened by	Sports (Disciplines)	Total	Men	Women	Events	Nations	Top nation
1896	I	Athens	Greece	6–15 April 1896; King George I of Greece	9 (10)	241	241	0	43	14 (Note: The IOC site for the 1896, 1900 and 1904 Summer Olympic Games does not include Mixed teams (teams of athletes from different nations) as a separate "nation" when counting participating nations. At the same time, the IOC shows Mixed teams in the results of competitions where these teams competed. Thus, specified number of national teams plus Mixed teams participated in the Games.)	United States
1900	II	Paris	France	14 May – 28 October 1900; Baron Pierre de Coubertin	19 (21)	1,226	1,202	24 (Note: At an earlier time the IOC database for the 1900 Summer Olympics listed 85 medal events, 24 participating countries and 997 athletes (22 women, 975 men). The Olympic historian and author, Bill Mallon, whose studies have shed light on the topic, suggested the number 95 events satisfying all four retrospective selection criteria (restricted to amateurs, international participation, open to all competitors and without handicapping) and now should be considered as Olympic events. In July 2021, the IOC upgraded its complete online database of all Olympic results explicitly to incorporate the data of the Olympic historians website, Olympedia.org, thus accepting Mallon's recommendation (based on four applied criteria) for events of the 1900 Olympic Games. The eleven events, the results of which had nevertheless been shown within the earlier IOC database, have been added over the former total of 85. Оne shooting event (20 metre military pistol, which was an event for professionals) has been removed. Acceptance of Mallon's recommendation increased the number of events to 95, and also entailed increasing the number of participating countries up to 26 and athletes up to 1226. After upgrading of the IOC online database the IOC web site results section contains 95 events. The IOC webpage for the 1900 Summer Olympics shows a total of 95 medal events, 26 participating countries and 1226 athletes. Furthermore, the IOC factsheet "The Games of the Olympiad" of November 2021 refers to 95 events, but still refers to old numbers of participating countries (24) and athletes (997).)	95	26 (Note: According to the International Olympic Committee, 26 nations sent competitors to this edition. The concept of "national teams" chosen by National Olympic Committees did not exist at this point in time. When counting the number of participating countries in the early Olympic Games, the IOC does not take into account otherwise unrepresented countries whose citizens competed for other countries. Modern research shows that at the 1900 Olympics, the athletes of at least four otherwise unrepresented countries (Canada, Luxembourg, Colombia, New Zealand) competed for other countries in both individual and team sports. The IOC website lists all of them in the results section under their nationalities, but does not include their countries among the 26 participating countries.)	France
1904	III	St. Louis	United States	1 July – 23 November 1904; Governor David R. Francis	16 (18)	651	645	6	95 (Note: The IOC webpage for the 1904 Summer Olympics sets the number at 95 events, while at one time the IOC webpage listed 91. The figure of 91 is sourced to a work by Olympic historian and author, Bill Mallon, whose studies have shed light on the topic. Events satisfying all four of these retrospective selection criteria of the early 20th century — restricted to amateurs, allowing international participation, open to all competitors and without handicapping — are now regarded as Olympic events.)	12	United States
1908	IV	London	United Kingdom	27 April – 31 October 1908; King Edward VII	22 (25)	2,008	1,971	37	110	22	Great Britain
1912	V	Stockholm	Sweden	6–22 July 1912; King Gustaf V	14 (18)	2,407	2,359	48	102	28	United States
1916	VI (Note: Although the Games of 1916, 1940, and 1944 were cancelled, the Roman numerals for those Games were still applied because the official titles of the Summer Games count the Olympiads, not the Games themselves, per the Olympic Charter. This contrasts with the Winter Olympics, which ignore the cancelled Winter Games of 1940 and 1944 in their numeric count.)	Berlin	Germany	Cancelled due to World War I							
1920	VII	Antwerp	Belgium	14 August – 12 September 1920; King Albert I of Belgium	22 (29)	2,626	2,561	65	156 (Note: The IOC webpage for the 1920 Summer Olympics gives the figure of 156 events, while at one time the IOC webpage listed 154 (difference was two sailing events in Amsterdam).)	39	United States
1924	VIII	Paris	France	5–27 July 1924; President Gaston Doumergue	17 (23)	3,089	2,954	135	126	44	United States
1928	IX	Amsterdam	Netherlands	28 July – 12 August 1928; Duke Henry of Mecklenburg-Schwerin	14 (20)	2,883	2,606	277	109	46	United States
1932	X	Los Angeles	United States	30 July – 14 August 1932; Vice President Charles Curtis	14 (20)	1,332	1,206	126	117	37	United States
1936	XI	Berlin	Germany	1–16 August 1936; Chancellor Adolf Hitler	19 (25)	3,963	3,632	331	129	49	Germany
1940	XII	Tokyo; Helsinki	Japan; Finland	Originally awarded to Japan, then awarded to Finland. Cancelled due to World War II							
1944	XIII	London	United Kingdom	Cancelled due to World War II							
1948	XIV	London	United Kingdom	29 July – 14 August 1948; King George VI	17 (23)	4,104	3,714	390	136	59	United States
1952	XV	Helsinki	Finland	19 July – 3 August 1952; President Juho Kusti Paasikivi	17 (23)	4,955	4,436	519	149	69	United States
1956	XVI	Melbourne; Stockholm (Note: Equestrian events were held in Stockholm, Sweden, several months before the other events in Melbourne due to Australian quarantine laws. Stockholm had to bid for the equestrian competitions separately.)	Australia; Sweden	22 November – 8 December 1956; Prince Philip, Duke of Edinburgh	17 (23)	3,314	2,938	376	151 (Note: The IOC webpage for the 1956 Summer Olympics gives a total of 151 events (145 events in Melbourne and six equestrian events in Stockholm).)	72 (Note: Five of the 72 nations that competed in the equestrian events in Stockholm did not attend the main Games in Melbourne.)	Soviet Union
1960	XVII	Rome	Italy	25 August – 11 September 1960; President Giovanni Gronchi	17 (23)	5,338	4,727	611	150	83	Soviet Union
1964	XVIII	Tokyo	Japan	10–24 October 1964; Emperor Hirohito	19 (25)	5,151	4,473	678	163	93	United States
1968	XIX	Mexico City	Mexico	12–27 October 1968; President Gustavo Díaz Ordaz	18 (24)	5,516	4,735	781	172	112	United States
1972	XX	Munich	West Germany	26 August – 11 September 1972 (Note: The 1972 Summer Olympics was originally scheduled to end on 10 September 1972, but was postponed by one day, to 11 September, after events had been suspended for 34 hours because of the Munich massacre, which happened after day 9.); President Gustav Heinemann	21 (28)	7,134	6,075	1,059	195	121	Soviet Union
1976	XXI	Montreal	Canada	17 July – 1 August 1976; Queen Elizabeth II	21 (27)	6,084	4,824	1,260	198	92	Soviet Union
1980	XXII	Moscow	Soviet Union	19 July – 3 August 1980; Chairman of the Presidium Leonid Brezhnev (Note: IOC records state Brezhnev opened the Moscow Games as "President", a title used at that time by the Chairman of the Presidium of the Supreme Soviet, or de jure head of state. (The office of President of the Soviet Union was not created until 1990, a year before the nation broke up.))	21 (27)	5,179	4,064	1,115	203	80	Soviet Union
1984	XXIII	Los Angeles	United States	28 July – 12 August 1984; President Ronald Reagan	21 (29)	6,829	5,263	1,566	221	140	United States
1988	XXIV	Seoul	South Korea	17 September – 2 October 1988; President Roh Tae-woo	23 (31)	8,391	6,197	2,194	237	159	Soviet Union
1992	XXV	Barcelona	Spain	25 July – 9 August 1992; King Juan Carlos I	25 (34)	9,356	6,652	2,704	257	169	Unified Team
1996	XXVI	Atlanta	United States	19 July - 4 August 1996; President Bill Clinton	26 (37)	10,318	6,806	3,512	271	197	United States
2000	XXVII	Sydney	Australia	15 September – 1 October 2000; Governor-General Sir William Deane	28 (40)	10,651	6,582	4,069	300	199	United States
2004	XXVIII	Athens	Greece	13–29 August 2004; President Konstantinos Stephanopoulos	28 (40)	10,625	6,296	4,329	301	201	United States
2008	XXIX	Beijing	China	8–24 August 2008; President Hu Jintao	28 (41)	10,942	6,305	4,637	302	204	China
2012	XXX	London	United Kingdom	27 July – 12 August 2012; Queen Elizabeth II	26 (39)	10,768	5,992	4,776	302	204	United States
2016	XXXI	Rio de Janeiro	Brazil	5–21 August 2016; Acting President Michel Temer	28 (42)	11,238	6,179	5,059	306	207	United States
2020	XXXII	Tokyo	Japan	23 July – 8 August 2021 (Note: Originally scheduled for 24 July – 9 August 2020, the Games were postponed by one year due to the COVID-19 pandemic. However, the event was still referred to as the 2020 Summer Olympics (marking the 32nd Olympiad) to preserve the four-year Olympiad cycle.); Emperor Naruhito	33 (50)	11,476	5,982	5,494	339	206	United States
2024	XXXIII	Paris	France	26 July – 11 August 2024; President Emmanuel Macron	32 (48)	10,714	5,357	5,357	329	206	United States
2028	XXXIV	Los Angeles	United States	14–30 July 2028; TBA	36 (51)	11,198 (Note: The LA28 programme maintains the core athlete quota of 10,500, with an extra 698 quota places allocated for the five optional sports proposed by the LA28 Organizing Committee, for 5,167 male athletes and 5,333 female. This will be the first Olympics to feature more female than male athletes.)	5,167	5,333	353	TBA	TBA
2032	XXXV	Brisbane	Australia	23 July – 8 August 2032; TBA	TBA	TBA	TBA	TBA	TBA	TBA	TBA
2036	XXXVI			TBA	TBA	TBA	TBA	TBA	TBA	TBA	TBA

== See also ==
- List of participating nations at the Summer Olympic Games
- List of Olympic Games scandals and controversies
- Lists of Olympic medalists
- Olympic Games ceremony
- Olympic Stadium
- Summer Paralympic Games
- Paralympic Games
- Winter Olympic Games
