= Dimitrios Deligiannis =

Dimitrios Deligiannis may refer to:

- Dimitrios Deligiannis (runner)
- Dimitrios Deligiannis (sailor)
