= Stamata Revithi =

Greek athlete

Stamata Revithi (Greek: Σταμάτα Ρεβίθη; 1866 – after 1896) was a Greek woman who ran the 40-kilometre marathon during the 1896 Summer Olympics. The Games excluded women from competition, but Revithi insisted that she be allowed to run. Revithi ran one day after the men had completed the official race, and although she finished the marathon in approximately 5 hours and 30 minutes and found witnesses to sign their names and verify the running time, she was not allowed to enter the Panathinaiko Stadium at the end of the race. She intended to present her documentation to the Hellenic Olympic Committee in the hopes that they would recognize her achievement, but it is not known whether she did so. No known record survives of Revithi's life after her run.

According to contemporary sources, a second woman, "Melpomene", also ran the 1896 marathon race. There is debate among Olympic historians as to whether or not Revithi and Melpomene are the same person.

== Biographical elements ==
=== Before the 1896 Olympics ===
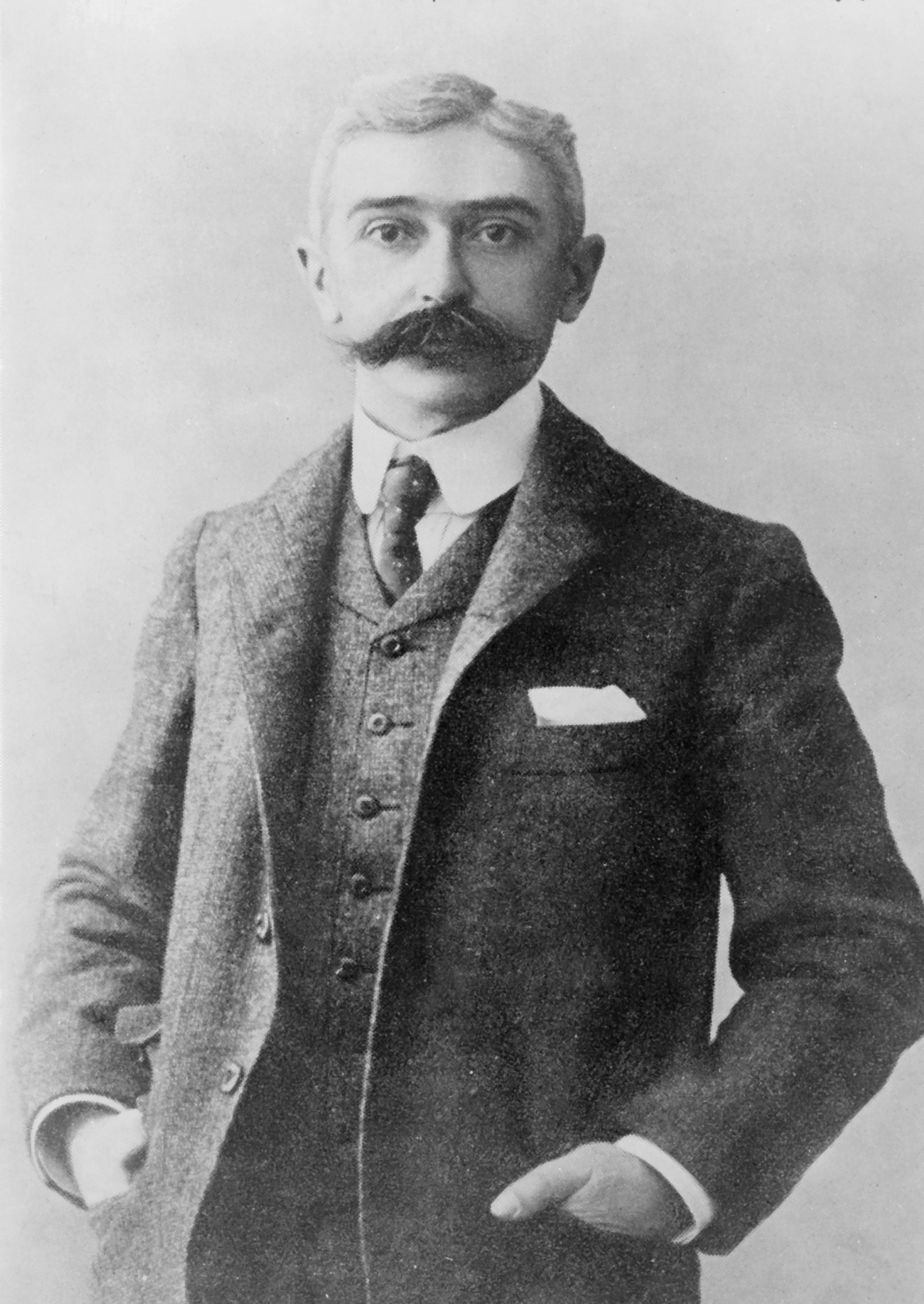
Coubertin believed "that contact with women's athletics is bad for [the male athlete], and that these athletics should be excluded from the Olympic programme".

Stamata Revithi was born in Syros in 1866. Records of her life from 1896 show that she was living in poverty in Piraeus in 1896. At that point she had given birth to two children, a son who died in 1895, aged seven, and another child who was seventeen months old by the time of the 1896 Olympics. According to Olympic historian Athanasios Tarasouleas, Revithi, who was blonde and thin with large eyes, looked much older than her age.

Revithi believed that she could gain employment in Athens, and so walked there from her home—a distance of 9 kilometers (5.6 mi). Her journey took place several days prior to the Olympic marathon, a special race of 40 kilometers (25 mi) invented as part of the athletics program, and based on Michel Bréal's idea of a race from the city of Marathon to the Pnyx. Bréal took inspiration from Pheidippides, who, according to legend, ran the distance from Marathon to Athens to announce the Greek victory over Persia at the Battle of Marathon, and died immediately after giving his message.

En route to Athens, Revithi encountered a male runner along the road. He gave her money and advised her to run the marathon to become famous, and, consequently, earn money or more easily find a job. After this discussion Revithi decided to run the race: she had enjoyed long-distance running as a child, and believed she could beat the male competitors.

The 1896 Olympic Games were the first held in the Modern era and the most important international multi-sport event Greece had ever hosted. The rules of the Games generally excluded women from competition. Influenced by both his times—in the Victorian era women were considered to be inferior to men—and his admiration for the ancient Olympic Games, when only men were allowed to participate in the events, Baron Pierre de Coubertin, the visionary of the modern Olympic Games, was not in favour of women's participation in the Olympic Games or in sports generally. He believed that a woman's greatest achievement would be to encourage her sons to be distinguished in sports and to applaud a man's effort.

=== 1896 marathon ===
Revithi arrived at the race location, the small village of Marathon, on Thursday, 9 April [O.S. 28 March], where the athletes had already assembled for the following day's race. She attracted the attention of the reporters and was warmly greeted by Marathon's mayor, who sheltered her in his house. She answered the reporters' questions and was quick-witted when a male runner from Chalandri teased her, predicting that when she entered the Stadium, there would be no crowds left. Revithi retorted that he should not insult women, since male Greek athletes had already been humiliated by the Americans.

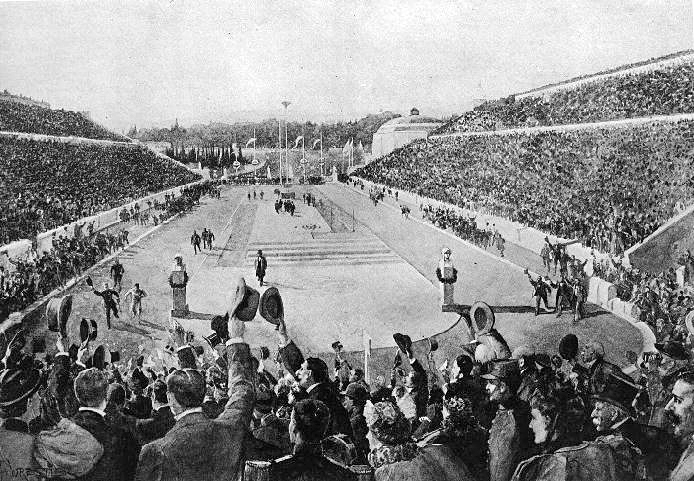
Spiridon Louis entering the Panathinaiko Stadium at the end of the marathon. Only 9 of the 17 male runners finished the marathon, one day before Revithi's race.

Prior to the start of the race on the morning of Friday, 10 April [O.S. 29 March], the old priest of Marathon, Ioannis Veliotis, was scheduled to say a prayer for the athletes in the church of Saint John. Veliotis refused to bless Revithi because she was not an officially recognized athlete. The organizing committee ultimately refused her entry into the race. Officially, she was rejected because the deadline for participation had expired; however, as Olympic historians David Martin and Roger Gynn point out, the real problem was her gender. According to Tarasouleas, the organizers promised that she would compete with a team of American women in another race in Athens, which never took place.

Beginning at 8:00 the following day, Revithi ran the marathon course on her own. Before starting, she had the town's only teacher, the mayor, and the city magistrate sign a statement testifying to the time she departed from the village. She ran the race at a steady pace and reached Parapigmata (the place where the Evangelismos Hospital stands today, near the Hilton Athens) at 13:30 (5½ hours). Revithi was not allowed to enter Panathinaiko Stadium—her race was stopped in Parapigmata by a few Greek military officers whom she asked to sign her handwritten report to certify her time of arrival in Athens. She stated to the reporters that she wanted to meet Timoleon Philimon (the General-Secretary of the Hellenic Olympic Committee) to present her case. Historians believe that she intended to present her documents to the Hellenic Olympic Committee in the hopes that they would recognize her achievement. Neither her reports nor documents from the Hellenic Olympic Committee have been discovered to provide corroboration.

=== Aftermath ===
There is no account of Revithi's life following the marathon. Although some newspapers printed articles about her story in the build-up to the marathon, these reports did not follow up on her life after the race. It is not known whether she met Philimon or if she ever found a job. As Tarasouleas stated, "Stamata Revithi was lost in the dust of history". Violet Piercy, of the United Kingdom, was the first woman to complete an officially timed marathon race: she clocked a time of 3 hours and 40 minutes in a British race on 3 October 1926. Women were finally allowed to run the Olympic marathon at the 1984 Summer Olympics, when American Joan Benoit won the inaugural race in a time of 2 hours and 24 minutes.

== Melpomene ==
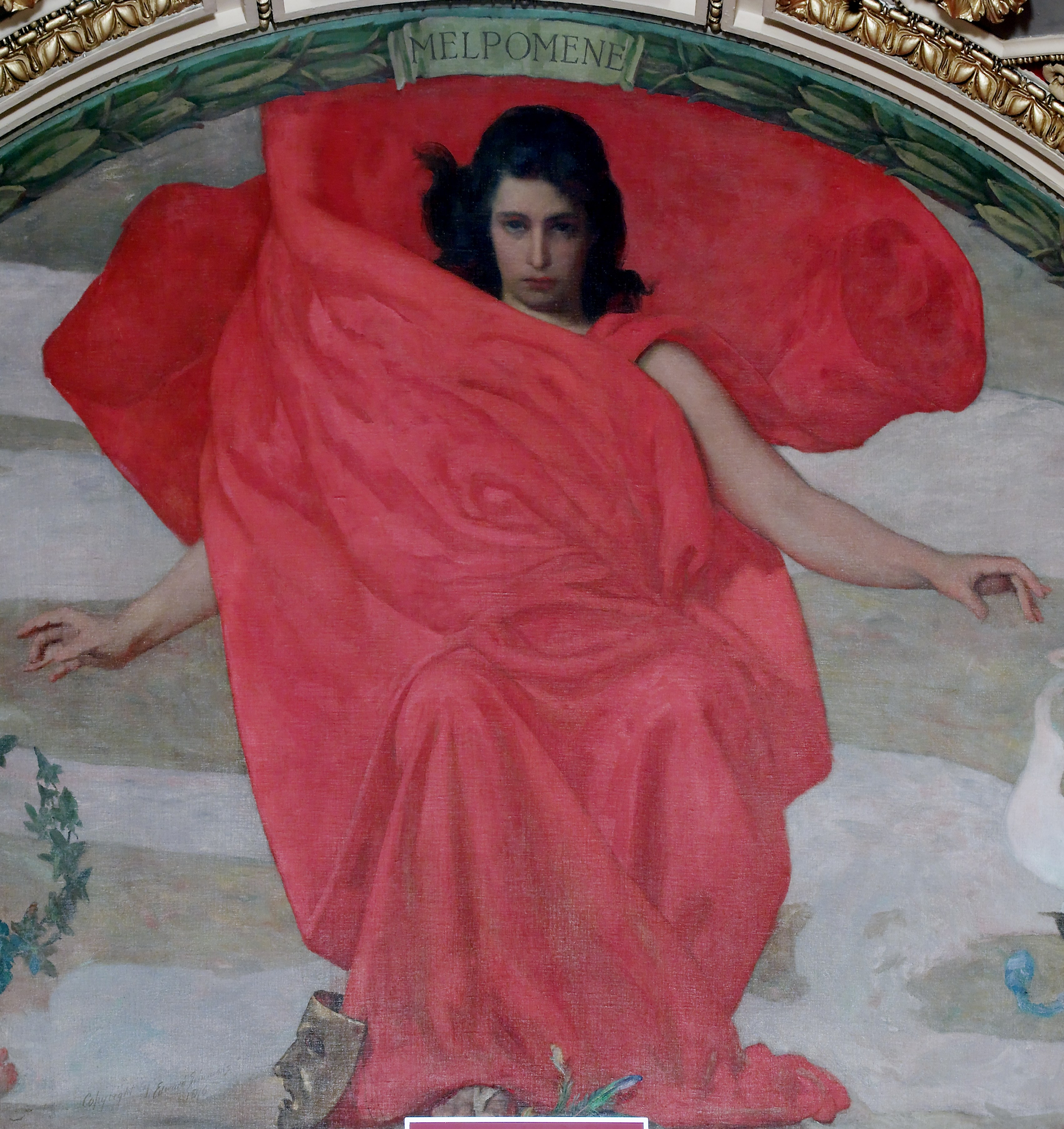
Painting of the Muse Melpomene by Edward Simmons, 1891; Thomas Jefferson Building, Washington, D.C. According to certain modern Olympic historians and journalists, Melpomene and Revithi are the same person, and the Greek woman was attributed the name of the Muse.

In March 1896, a French-language newspaper in Athens (the Messager d'Athènes) reported that there was "talk of a woman who had enrolled as a participant in the Marathon race. In the test run which she completed on her own [...] she took 4½ hours to run the distance of 42 [sic] kilometres which separates Marathon from Athens." Later that year, Franz Kémény, a founding International Olympic Committee member from Hungary, wrote in German that, "indeed a lady, Miss Melpomene, completed the 40 kilometres marathon in 4½ hours and requested an entry into the Olympic Games competition. This was reportedly denied by the commission." According to Martin and Gynn, "a peculiarity here is why there is no first name for Melpomene". The Messager report faded into obscurity for about 30 years before it was revived in 1927 in an issue of Der Leichtathlet.

Olympic historian Karl Lennartz contends that two women ran the marathon in 1896, and that the name "Melpomene" was confirmed by both Kémény and Alfréd Hajós, two-time Olympic swim champion of 1896. Lennartz presents the following account: a young woman named Melpomene wanted to run the race and completed the distance in 4½ hours at the end of February or the beginning of March. The organizing committee, however, did not allow her to run, and the newspaper Akropolis criticized the committee for its decision. The Olympic Marathon took place on 10 April [O.S. 29 March] 1896, and another female runner, Stamata Revithi, took 5½ hours to run the course on 11 April [O.S. 30 March] 1896. The newspapers Asti, New Aristophanes and Atlantida reported this on 12 April [O.S. 31 March] 1896.

However, Tarasouleas argues that no contemporary press reports in Greek newspapers mention Melpomene by name, while the name Revithi appears many times; Tarasouleas suggests that Melpomene and Revithi are the same person, and Martin and Green argue that "a contemporary account referring to Revithi as a well-known marathon runner could explain the earlier run by a woman over the marathon course—this was by Revithi herself, not Melpomene". The daily Athens newspaper Estia of 4 April [O.S. 23 March] 1896 refers to "the strange woman, who, having run a few days ago in the Marathon as a try-out, intends to compete the day after tomorrow. Today she came to our offices and said 'should my shoes hinder me, I will remove them on the way and continue barefoot'." Moreover, Tarasouleas notes that on 13 March [O.S. 1 March] 1896, another local newspaper indicated that a woman and her baby had registered to run the marathon, but again her name is not mentioned. Trying to resolve the mystery, Tarasouleas asserts that "perhaps Revithi had two names, or perhaps for reasons unknown she was attributed the name of the Muse Melpomene".

== See also ==
- Women at the Olympics
