= Spyridon Belokas =

Greek long-distance runner

Spyridon Belokas (Greek: Σπυρίδων Μπελόκας, born 1877, date of death unknown) was a Greek athlete. He competed at the 1896 Summer Olympics in Athens. He was born in Athens.

Belokas was one of 17 athletes to start the Olympic marathon race. He crossed the finish line in third place behind Spiridon Louis and Charilaos Vasilakos, but was later found to have covered part of the course of the race by carriage rather than on foot. Belokas was therefore disqualified, and Gyula Kellner was awarded third place.
