= Ioannis Lavrentis =

Greek long-distance runner

- Ιωάννης Λαυρέντης
- Born: Ioannis Georgios Lavrenti
- Occupation: Athlete
- Known for: 1896 Summer Olympics

Ioannis Georgios Lavrentis (Greek: Ιωάννης Λαυρέντης) was a Greek athlete and the winner of the second modern-day official marathon race. The race was held on 5 April 1896. (Note: Two qualifying races were held to select the Greek Olympic marathon runners. The first race was on March 22 of the Gregorian calendar (or alternately on March 10 of the Julian calendar). The second race was held on April 5 of the Gregorian calendar (or alternately on March 24 of the Julian calendar). Note, the source Martin 2000 is incorrect about the dates of the two qualifying races. The correct dates (noted above) are listed in Bijkerk and Young 1999, page 27, annotation 3. For further details regarding the dates see Talk:Charilaos Vasilakos.) Lavrentis was among 38 runners who participated in the race in an attempt to qualify for the 1896 Summer Olympics in Athens, Greece. He won the race with a time of 3:11:27.

On 10 April 1896, he was one of 17 athletes to compete in the first Olympic marathon. Seven runners, including Lavrentis, did not finish the Olympic race.
