= Dimitrios Christopoulos =

Greek marathon runner

Dimitrios Christopoulos (Greek: Δημήτριος Χριστόπουλος), also transliterated as Khristopoulos, was a Greek athlete. He competed at the 1896 Summer Olympics in Athens.

Christopoulos was one of 17 athletes to start the marathon race. He was one of the seven runners that dropped out of the race.
