= Breal's Silver Cup =

Trophy awarded to the marathon winner in the 1896 summer Olympics

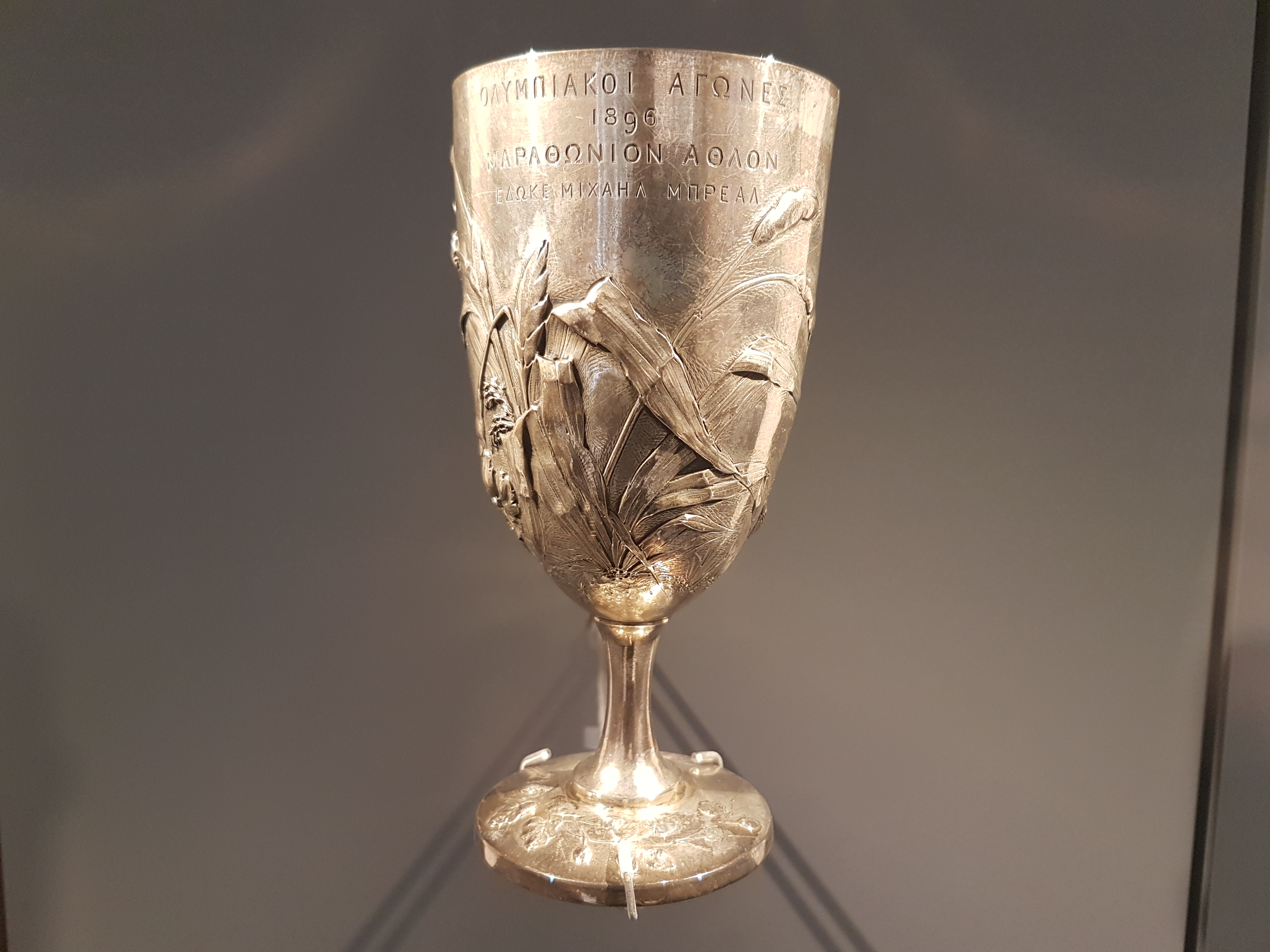
Bréal's Cup

Bréal's Cup is the trophy awarded to Spyros Louis, the Marathon winner at the first modern Olympic Games held in Athens, in 1896. The Cup was designed by French philhellene Michel Bréal, who had the original idea to include a Marathon race in the Olympic Games.

The Cup is made of pure silver. On the top part of the Cup there is the inscription "OLYMPIC GAMES 1896, MARATHON TROPHY DONATED BY MICHAEL BREAL". The remaining surface of the Cup had a relief decoration depicting birds and aquatic plants known to exist in the swamp lands of Marathon in ancient times. With this reference, Breal wanted to give the Cup a symbolic significance and connect the ancient Olympic Games with the modern ones. The Cup belongs to the Stavros Niarchos Foundation, which acquired it at an auction held on April 18, 2012 by Christie's in London. A delegation from the Municipality of Amarousion, the birthplace of Spyros Louis, attended and bid in the auction. The Cup was sold by the grandson of Spyros Louis, who has the same name.

After its acquisition by the Stavros Niarchos Foundation, the Cup was displayed at the Acropolis Museum in Athens and the Olympic Museum in Lausanne. It has been displayed at the Stavros Niarchos Foundation Cultural Center in Kallithea, Athens since the complex's 2016 opening.
