= Spyridon Louis =

Greek amateur athlete (1873–1940)

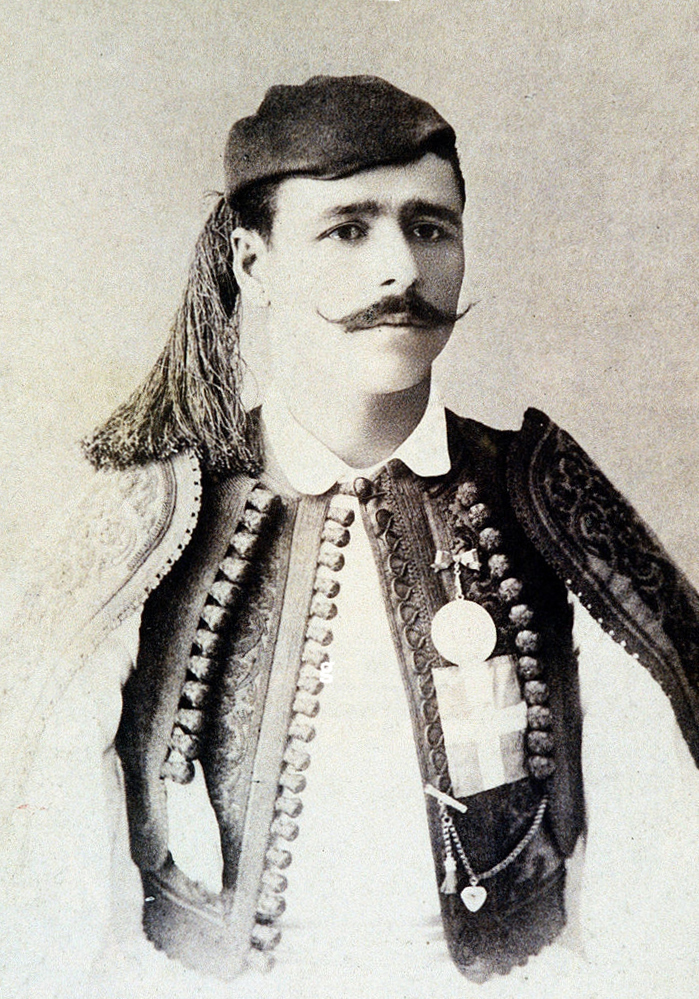
- Louis in 1896

Personal information
- Born: 12 January 1873 Marousi, Kingdom of Greece
- Died: 26 March 1940 (aged 67) Marousi, Kingdom of Greece

Sport
- Sport: Athletics
- Event: Marathon

Achievements and titles
- Personal best: 2:58:50 (1896)
Medal record
Representing Greece
Olympic Games
Gold medal – first place	1896 Athens	Marathon

Spyridon Louis (Greek: Σπυρίδων Λούης [spiˈriðon ˈluis], sometimes transliterated Spiridon Loues; 12 January 1873 – 26 March 1940), commonly known as Spyros Louis (Σπύρος Λούης), was a Greek water carrier who won the first modern-day Olympic marathon at the 1896 Summer Olympics. Following his victory, he was celebrated as a national hero.

A former soldier, Louis was encouraged to try out for the Olympics by his former commanding officer. After progressing through qualifying, he went on to win the inaugural Olympic marathon after placing first among seventeen competitors. Louis later became a police officer and a farmer. Outside of his athletics career, Louis was arrested for forgery, of which he was acquitted after spending a year in jail.

== Early life ==
Spyridon Louis was born in the town of Marousi, north of Athens, into a poor family. Louis's father sold mineral water in Athens, which at the time lacked a central water supply, and Spyridon helped him by transporting it.

== Olympic preparation ==
After Pierre de Coubertin's decision in 1894 to revive the Olympic Games, preparations were made to organise the first modern Olympics in Athens. One of the races would be the marathon, an event which had never been held before. It had been suggested by Frenchman Michel Bréal, who was inspired by the legend of the messenger Pheidippides, who had run from Marathon to Athens to announce the Athenian victory in the Battle of Marathon—and then dropped dead.

The Greeks were very enthusiastic about this new event and decided to hold qualifiers for the marathon. These races were started by Colonel Papadiamantopoulos, whom Louis previously served under in the military. The first qualifying race—the first ever marathon race—was held on 22 March, and was won by Charilaos Vasilakos in 3 hours, 18 minutes. Louis participated in the second qualifying race, two weeks later, and placed fifth. Papadiamantopoulos, who knew of Louis's talent in running, had convinced him to try out.

The Olympic marathon was run on 10 April (or 29 March by the Julian calendar then in use in Greece). The Greek public had been very enthusiastic about the Games, but were disappointed in the fact that no track and field event had yet been won by a Greek competitor. The victory in the discus throw, a classical Greek event, by the American Robert Garrett had been particularly painful. Because of its close connection with Greek history, the public yearned for the marathon to be won by one of their countrymen.

== Marathon race ==
In the marathon, Colonel Papadiamantopoulos gave the starting signal for the small field, consisting of seventeen athletes, thirteen of them representing Greece. The early leader of the race, which led over dusty dirt roads along which throngs of Greeks had gathered to watch, was the Frenchman Albin Lermusiaux, who had placed third in the 1500 metres prior to the marathon. In the town of Pikermi, Louis is said to have made a stop at a local inn to drink a glass of wine. (Louis's grandson, also Spyridon Louis, has stated that this is incorrect; that his grandfather's girlfriend gave him half an orange and shortly afterwards he "got a glass of cognac from his future father-in-law.") After asking for the advantage of the other runners, he confidently declared he would overtake them all before the end.

After 26 km, Lermusiaux was exhausted and abandoned the race. The lead was taken over by Edwin Flack, an Australian who won the 800 and 1500 m races. Louis slowly closed in on Flack. The Australian, not used to running long distances, collapsed a few kilometers onwards, giving Louis the lead.

During the race, there was tension among the Greek spectators when Flack was in first place. However, when news was delivered to the fans that Louis overtook the lead, the cry "Hellene, Hellene!" was taken up by rapturous spectators. Louis was greeted with cheers after entering the Panathenaic Stadium for the final part of the marathon. Louis ran with Crown Prince Constantine and Prince George of Greece during the last lap, finishing with a time of 2:58:50. Louis's victory set off wild celebrations, as described in the official report of the Games:

Here the Olympionic Victor was received with full honour; the King rose from his seat and congratulated him most warmly on his success. Some of the King's aides-de-camp, and several members of the Committee went so far as to kiss and embrace the victor, who finally was carried in triumph to the retiring room under the vaulted entrance. The scene witnessed then inside the Stadion cannot be easily described, even strangers were carried away by the general enthusiasm.

Adding to the celebrations, two more Greek runners entered the stadium to finish in second and third place. Third place finisher Spyridon Belokas was later found to have covered part of the course by carriage and was disqualified; third place was awarded to the Hungarian Gyula Kellner.

== After the Olympics ==
After his victory, Louis received gifts from many countrymen, ranging from jewellery to a lifelong free shave at a barber shop. It is unknown whether he accepted all these gifts, although he did take back home the carriage he had asked of the king. After the Olympics, Louis ended his athletic career to become a farmer and a police officer.

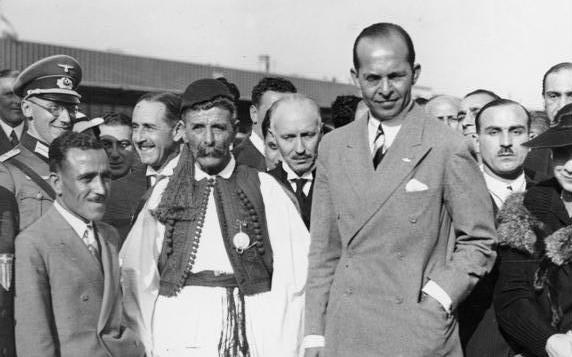
Spyridon Louis with Crown Prince (later king) Paul of Greece in Berlin, during the 1936 Summer Olympics

In 1926, Louis was arrested on charges of falsifying military documents and was imprisoned. After spending more than a year in jail, he was acquitted.

His last public appearance came in 1936, when he was invited to be a guest of honour by the organizers of the 1936 Summer Olympics, held in Berlin. After bearing the standard of the Greek team during the opening ceremonies, he was received by Adolf Hitler and offered him an olive branch from Olympia, the birthplace of the Olympic Games, as a symbol of peace. Louis recalled the moments after his victory: "That hour was something unimaginable and it still appears to me in my memory like a dream … Twigs and flowers were raining down on me. Everybody was calling out my name and throwing their hats in the air ..."

Several months before the Italian invasion of Greece, Louis died. In Greece, various sports establishments are named after him. These include the Olympic Stadium of Athens where the 2004 Summer Olympics were held, as well as the road outside the stadium.

The Jayne Mansfield movie It Happened in Athens is a heavily fictionalized take on Louis and the marathon, and his story is featured in the 1984 TV miniseries The First Olympics: Athens 1896. The expression 'to become Louis' (Greek: γίνομαι Λούης, romanized: yinomai Louis) is used in Greece as a metaphor meaning "tο disappear by running fast".

== Breal's Silver Cup ==
The silver cup given to Louis at the first modern Olympic Games staged in Athens in 1896, was sold for £541,250 ($860,000) in London during a Christie's auction on 18 April 2012. The trophy, with a height of six inches, broke the auction record for Olympic memorabilia. The item was sold on the day Britain marked the 100 days' countdown to the 2012 London Olympics. Christie's called the auction "heated" and involved six bidders. The auctioneer later confirmed the buyer was the Stavros Niarchos Foundation.

The cup is displayed at the Stavros Niarchos Foundation Cultural Center, a project of the Stavros Niarchos Foundation, fulfilling the commitment of the foundation to make it available to the public and to share it with everyone, upon the project's completion. During the development of the project, the cup was temporarily displayed at the Acropolis Museum of Athens and the Olympic Museum in Lausanne, during a period that coincided with the International Marathon of Lausanne.
