= Stamatios Masouris =

Greek long-distance runner

Stamatios Masouris (Greek: Σταμάτιος Μασούρης) was a Greek athlete. He competed at the 1896 Summer Olympics in Athens. Masouris was one of 17 athletes to start the marathon race. He finished eighth of the nine athletes to have completed the race.
