= Eleftherios Papasymeon =

Greek long-distance runner

Eleftherios Papasymeon (Greek: Ελευθέριος Παπασυμεών) was a Greek athlete. He competed at the 1896 Summer Olympics in Athens. Papasimeon was one of 17 athletes to start the marathon race. He finished fifth of the nine athletes to have completed the race.
