= Evangelos Gerakeris =

Greek long-distance runner

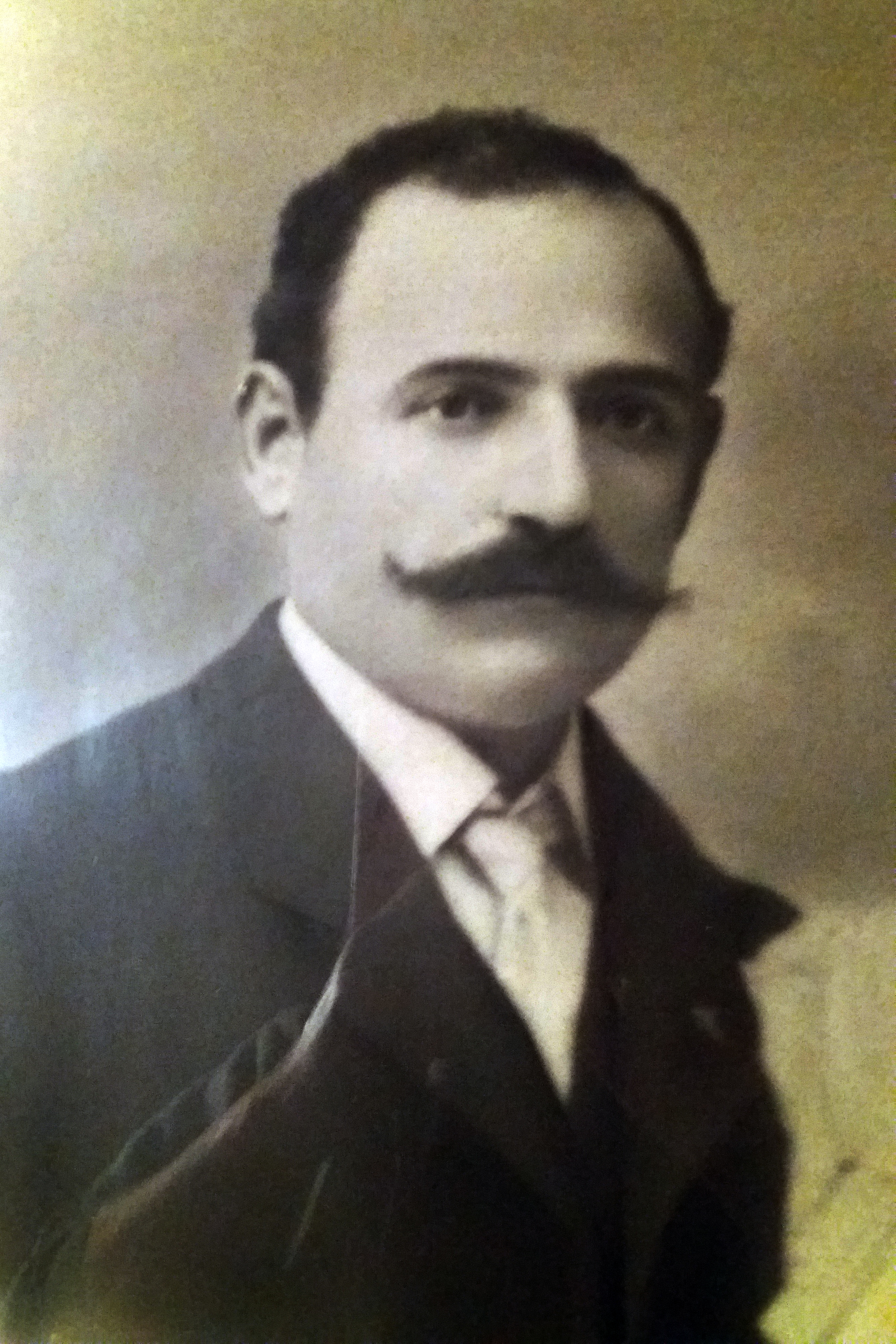
Evangelism Portrait

Evangelos Gerakakis (Greek: Ευάγγελος Γερακάκης; born 1871 in Chalkida, Greece; died 1913 in Athens, Greece) was a Greek athlete. He competed at the 1896 Summer Olympics in Athens.

Gerakakis was one of 17 athletes to start the marathon race. He finished seventh of the nine athletes to have completed the race.
