= Georgios Grigoriou =

Greek long-distance runner

Georgios Grigoriou (Greek: Γεώργιος Γρηγορίου, born 1871, date of death unknown) was a Greek athlete. He was born in Sozopol, which was then in the Ottoman Empire but would become part of the Principality of Bulgaria when it was formed in 1878. He competed at the 1896 Summer Olympics in Athens. Grigoriou was one of 17 athletes to start the marathon race. He was one of the seven runners that dropped out of the race.
