= Charilaos Vasilakos =

Greek runner (1875–1964)

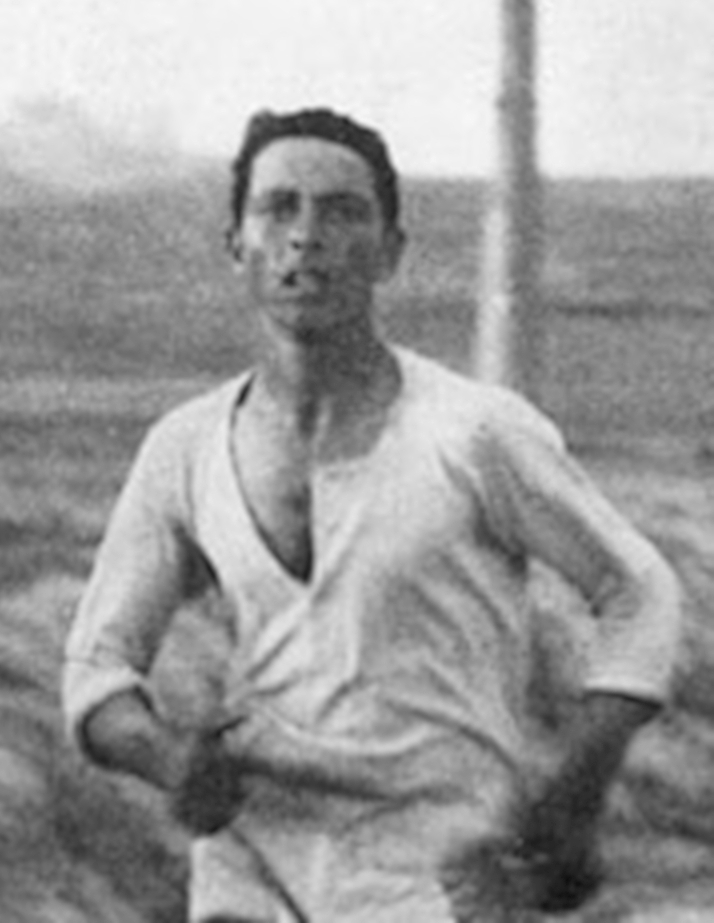
- Vasilakos in training on the road from Marathon to Athens in preparation for the 1896 Olympics

Personal information
- Born: November 1875 Piraeus, Greece
- Died: 1 December 1964 (aged 89) Athens, Greece

Sport
- Club: Panellinios G.S.

Achievements and titles
- Personal best: Marathon: 3:06:03
Medal record
Men's athletics
Representing Greece
Olympic Games
Silver medal – second place	1896 Athens	Marathon

Charilaos Vasilakos (Greek: Χαρίλαος Βασιλάκος, November 1875 – 1 December 1964) was a Greek athlete and the first man to win a marathon race. He also won a silver medal (Note: The silver medal was awarded retrospectively several years later. At the time of the 1896 Olympics, copper medals were awarded to second place finishers and silver medals were awarded to first place finishers.) for a second place finish in marathon at the 1896 Summer Olympics in Athens.

== Biography ==
Vasilakos was born in Piraeus, Greece. His father, Michael Vasilakos, was from the Mani region and served in the army. He was the oldest of three siblings and at the age of fourteen he lost his father. As a young man he studied law at the University of Athens and worked in the Athens court of first instance. He was a member of the Panellinios sports club and a dedicated long-distance runner.

On 22 March 1896, Greece held the first modern Panhellenic Games. The main purpose of the games was to select the team that would compete in the first Modern Olympic Games later the same year. All participants were members of Greek sports clubs. Vasilakos, who had a reputation as a strong long-distance runner, won the marathon race with a time of 3 hours and 18 minutes.

Vasilakos was one of seventeen athletes who started the Olympic race on 10 April 1896. He finished in second place, behind Spiridon Louis, with a time of 3:06:03 as one of only nine finishers. At the time marathon races were run on 40-kilometre courses rather than the now-standard 42.195 kilometres.

After the Olympics, Vasilakos helped establish, and participated in, racewalking in Greece. In 1900 he won the first Greek 1000 metres walking race and participated in several races between 1900 and 1906.

Vasilakos studied law and became a customs director in the Greek Ministry of Finance. He established a reputation for honesty and integrity. In 1960, he was awarded the Gold Cross of the Order of Phoenix by King Paul of Greece. Annual marathon races in Olympia commemorate Vasilakos. His wife was named Helen. He died in Athens in 1964.

The 2011 book titled Ο Χαρίλαος Βασιλάκος και η αμφιλεγόμενη πρωτιά του Σπύρου Λούη (Charilaos Vasilakos and the controversial lead of Spyros Louis), presents a biography of Vasilakos and signs which challenge the 1896 Olympic race results.

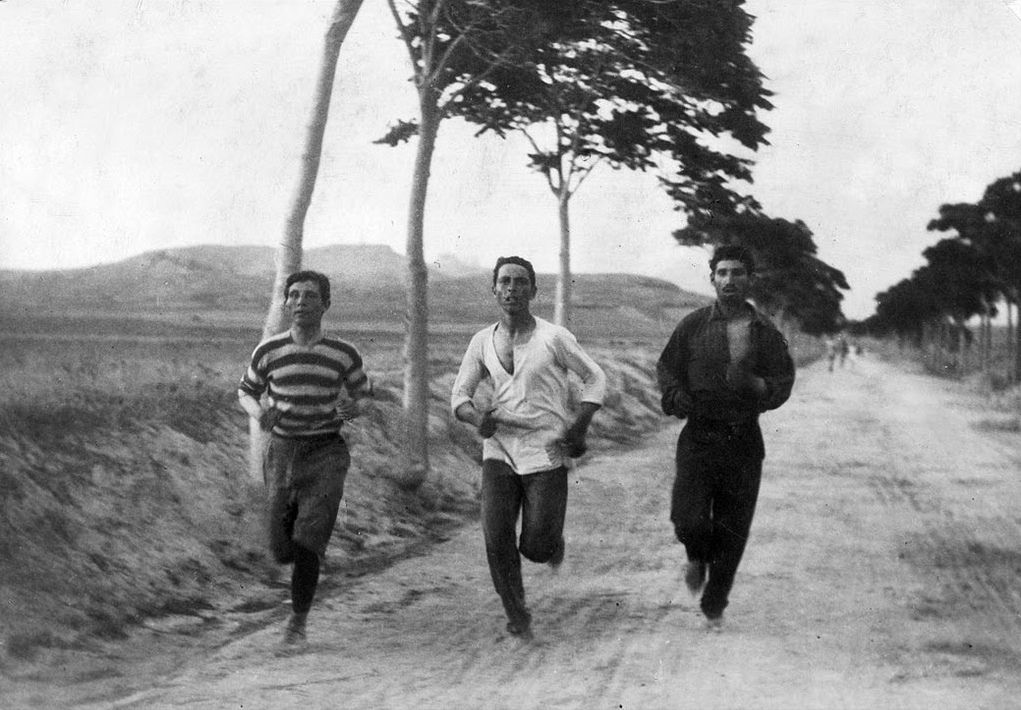
Marathon runners in training, 1896, Vasilakos is in the center

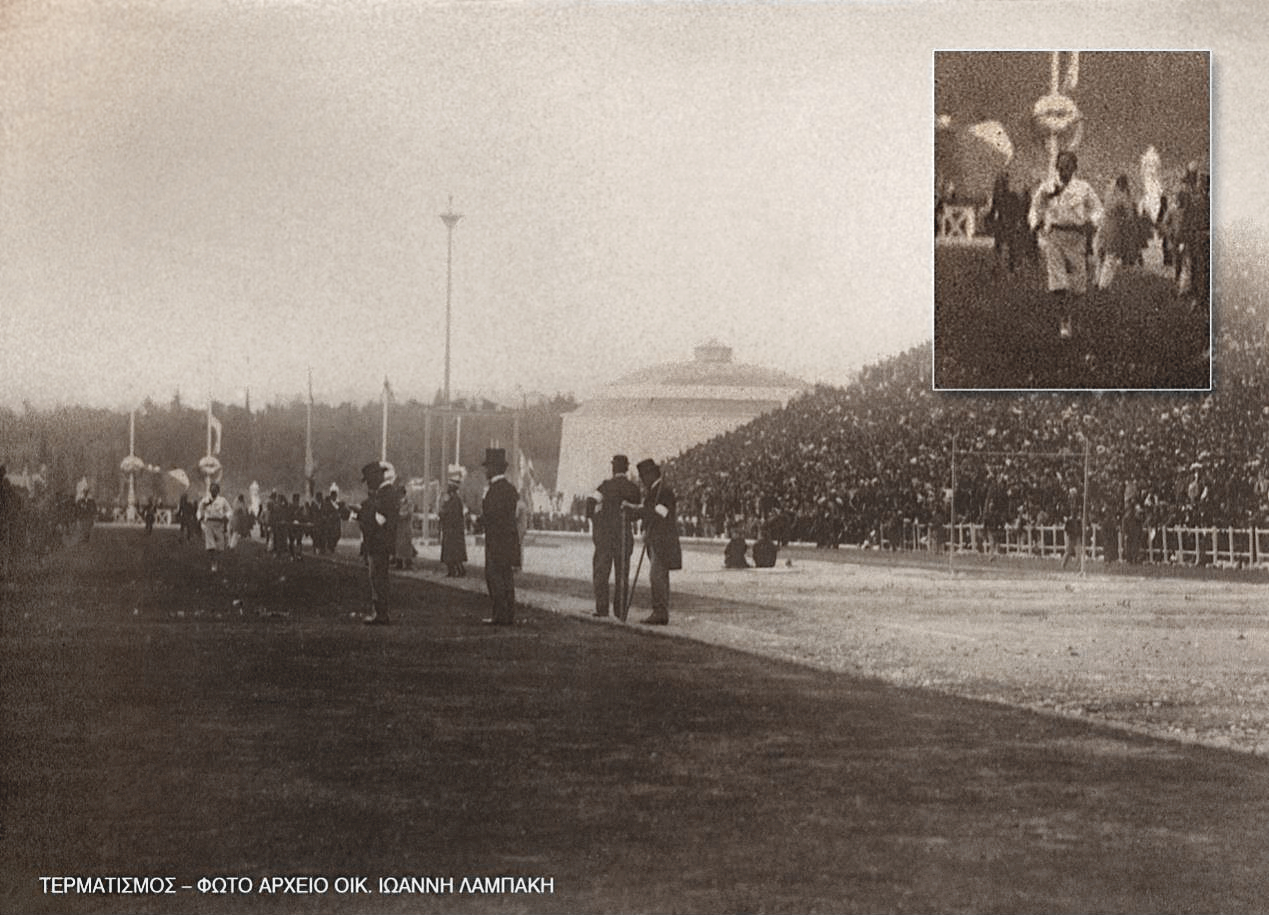
Vasilakos approaching the finish line of the 1896 Olympic marathon race at Panathenaic Stadium

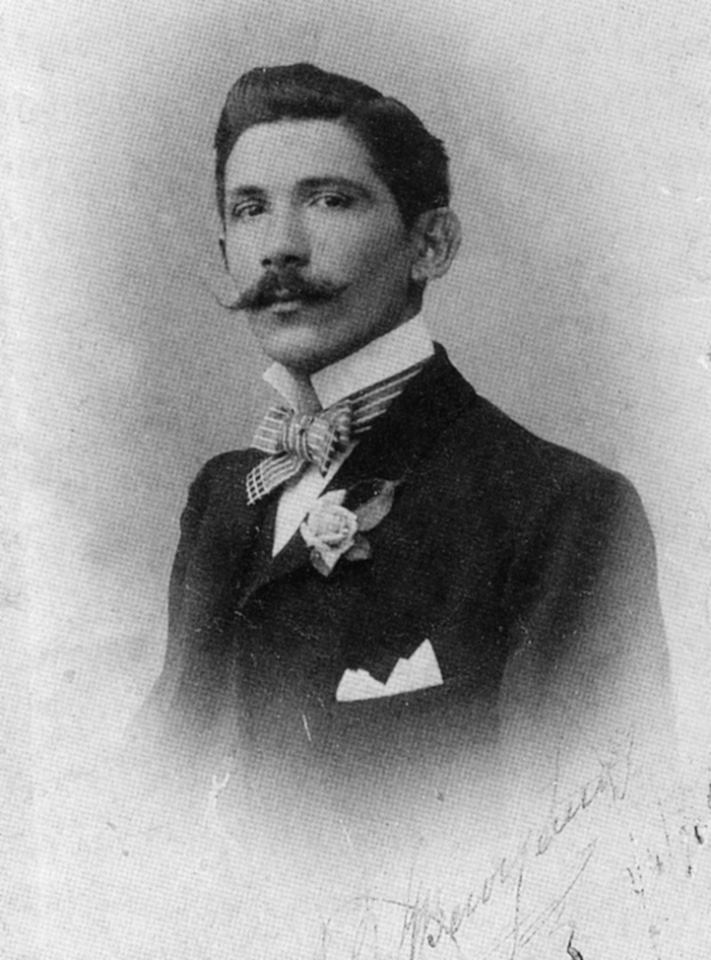
Portrait of Vasilakos, circa 1896
