= Gyula Kellner =

Hungarian athlete (1871–1940)

Olympic medal record

Men's athletics

Representing Hungary
Bronze medal – third place	1896 Athens	Marathon

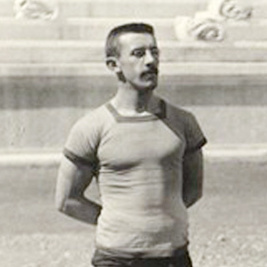

Gyula Richárd Kellner (April 11, 1871, in Budapest, Kingdom of Hungary – July 28, 1940, in Szolnok, Kingdom of Hungary) was a Hungarian athlete. He competed at the 1896 Summer Olympics in Athens.

Kellner was one of 17 athletes to start the marathon race (the first modern Olympic marathon). He finished in fourth place, but when the third-place finisher, Spiridon Belokas, was found to have covered a portion of the race by carriage, Kellner was awarded third place. His time was 3:06.35.
