= Dimitrios Deligiannis (runner) =

Greek distance runner

Dimitrios Deligiannis (Greek: Δημήτριος Δεληγιάννης, born 1873, date of death unknown) was a Greek runner. He competed at the 1896 Summer Olympics in Athens. He was born in Stemnitsa, Gortynia.

Deligiannis was one of 17 athletes to start the marathon race. He finished sixth of the nine athletes to have completed the race.
