= Ilias Kafetzis =

Greek long-distance runner

Ilias G. Kafetzis (Greek: Ηλίας Γ. Καφετζής) was a Greek athlete. He competed at the 1896 Summer Olympics in Athens. Kafetzis was one of 17 athletes to start the marathon race. He was one of the seven runners that dropped out of the race.
