= Sokratis Lagoudakis =

Greek long-distance runner

Sokratis Lagoudakis (Greek: Σωκράτης Λαγουδάκης) (born 1861 in Crete; died 3 June 1944 in Alexandria, Kingdom of Egypt) was a Greek physician, scholar, and long-distance runner who competed at the 1896 Summer Olympics in Athens. Lagoudakis was one of 17 athletes to start the marathon race. He finished last of the nine athletes to have completed the race.
