= Ioannis Vrettos =

Greek long-distance runner

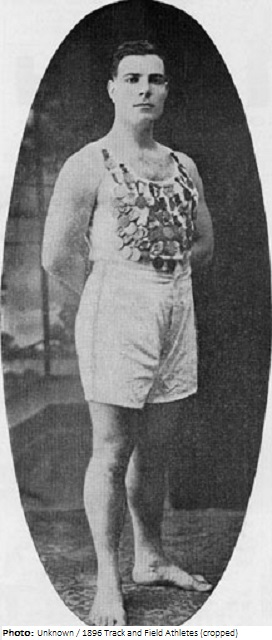

Personal information
- Home town: Chalandri, Greece

Ioannis Vrettos (Greek: Ιωάννης Βρεττός) was a Greek long-distance runner. He competed at the 1896 Summer Olympics in Athens.

Vrettos was one of 17 athletes to start the marathon race. He finished fourth of the nine athletes who completed the race.

Vrettos was from Chalandri, Greece.
