= Michel Bréal =

French philologist (1832–1915)

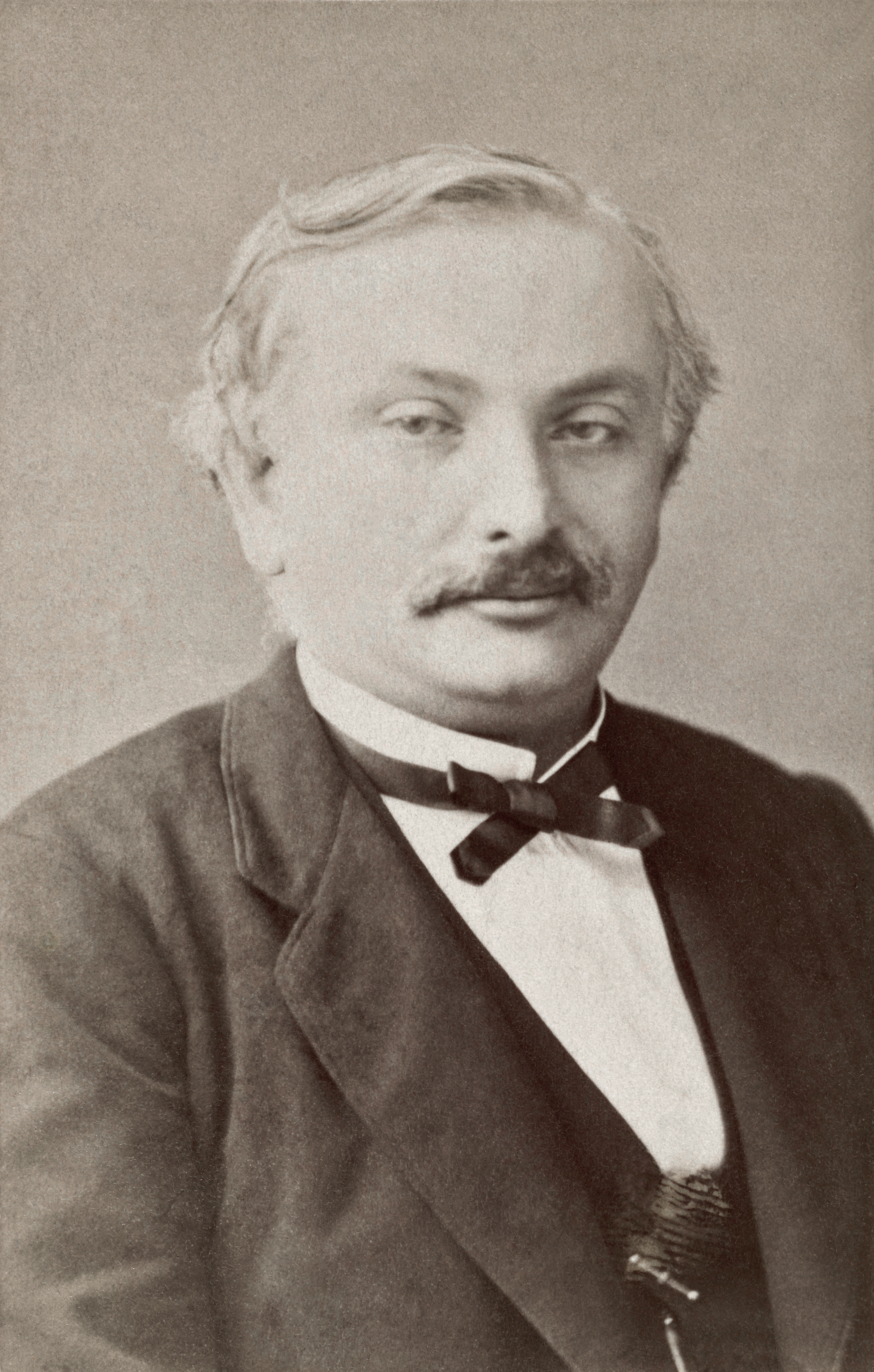
- Born: Michel Jules Alfred Bréal; 26 March 1832; Landau, Kingdom of Bavaria
- Died: 25 November 1915 (aged 83); Paris, France

Philosophical work
- Main interests: Semantics

Michel Jules Alfred Bréal (French: [miʃɛl bʁeal]; 26 March 1832 – 25 November 1915), French philologist, was born at Landau in Rhenish Palatinate. He is often identified as a founder of modern semantics. He was also the creator of the modern marathon race, having proposed its first running at the 1896 Olympic Games and offered what would become known as Breal's Silver Cup to the winner.

== Life and career ==
Michel Bréal was born at Landau in Germany of French-Jewish parents.

After studying at Wissembourg, Metz and Paris, he entered the École Normale Supérieure in 1852. In 1857 he went to Berlin, where he studied Sanskrit under Franz Bopp and Albrecht Weber. On his return to France he obtained an appointment in the department of oriental manuscripts at the Bibliothèque Impériale. In 1864 he became professor of comparative grammar at the Collège de France, in 1875 member of the Académie des Inscriptions et Belles-lettres, in 1879 inspecteur général for higher education until the abolition of the office in 1888. In 1890 he was made commander of the Legion of Honour. He resigned his chair in 1905, and died in Paris.

In 1883, Bréal coined the term semantics in the article "Les lois intellectuelles du langage. Fragment de sémantique" published in the journal Annuaire de l'Association des études grecques en France (page 133).

== Invention of the modern marathon ==
Bréal is credited with the invention of the marathon race. He attended the 1894 Founding Congress of the International Olympic Committee at the Sorbonne in Paris; at its concluding dinner, he was seated next to the father of the modern games, Pierre de Coubertin. Soon after the congress, on September 15, 1894, Bréal sent Coubertin a letter outlining his idea:

Puisque vous allez à Athènes, voyez donc, si l’on peut organiser une course de Marathon au Pnyx. Cela aura une saveur antique. Si nous savions le temps qu’a mis le guerrier grec, nous pourrions établir le record. Je réclamerais pour ma part l’honneur d’offrir « la Coupe de Marathon ».

Translation: Since you are going to Athens, see if we can organize a Marathon race at the Pnyx. This would have an antique flavor. If we knew how long the Greek warrior took, we could set the distance. For my part, I would claim the honor of offering the "Marathon Cup."

The legend of the ancient run — the run of the Greek soldier Pheidippides to announce victory at the Battle of Marathon to either Athens — had become more culturally prominent in late 19th-century Europe. Robert Browning's 1879 poem "Pheidippides" had brought the story to wider attention, as had an 1890 archeological dig of the Marathon tumuli. Before Bréal's proposal, the 1896 Olympics had not planned any races longer than 1500 meters; some argued that such a long distance was "contrary to the principles of sport and of hygiene."

As part of his sponsorship of the race, Bréal had a Paris jeweler create Breal's Silver Cup for the winner, who ended up being the Greek Spyros Louis.

== Works ==
Among his works, which deal mainly with mythological and philological subjects, may be mentioned:

- L'Étude des origines de la religion zoroastrienne (1862), for which a prize was awarded him by the Académie des Inscriptions
- Hercule et Cacus (1863), in which he disputes the principles of the symbolic school in the interpretation of myths
- Le Mythe d'Œdipe (1864)
- Les Tables eugubines (1875)
- Mélanges de mythologie et de linguistique (2nd. ed., 1882)
- Leçons de mots (1882, 1886)
- Dictionnaire étymologique latin (1885)
- Grammaire latine (1890).
- Essai de sémantique (1897), on the signification of words, which was translated into English by Mrs Emmeline Cust with preface by J. P. Postgate.
- a translation of Bopp's Comparative Grammar (1866–1874), with introductions, which is highly valued.

He also wrote pamphlets on education in France, the teaching of ancient languages, and the reform of French orthography. In 1906 he published Pour mieux connaitre Homère.

- Hans W. Giessen, Heinz-Helmut Lüger, Günther Volz (Hrsg.): Michel Bréal – Grenzüberschreitende Signaturen. Verlag Empirische Pädagogik, Landau 2007 ISBN 3-9373-3363-0
- Hans W. Giessen: Mythos Marathon. Von Herodot über Bréal bis zur Gegenwart. (= Landauer Schriften zur Kommunikations- und Kulturwissenschaft. Band 17). Verlag Empirische Pädagogik, Landau 2010, ISBN 978-3-941320-46-8.
- Heinz-Helmut Lüger (dir.), Hans W. Giessen (dir.) et Bernard Weigel (dir.), Entre la France et l'Allemagne : Michel Bréal, intellectuel engagé, Limoges, Lambert-Lucas, 2012 (ISBN 978-2-35935-043-2)
- Brigitte Nerlich: Michel Bréal: mettre l’homme dans la langue. In: Penser l’histoire des savoirs linguistiques. Hommage à Sylvain Auroux. Textes réunis par Sylvie Archaimbault Jean-Marie Fournier & Valérie Raby, 611–619. Lyon: ENS, 2013. (ISBN 978-2-84788-417-3).
- Jan Noordegraaf: Salient scholars. Michel Bréal and his Dutch connections. In: Penser l’histoire des savoirs linguistiques. Hommage à Sylvain Auroux. Textes réunis par Sylvie Archaimbault Jean-Marie Fournier & Valérie Raby, 621–632. Lyon: ENS, 2013. (ISBN 978-2-84788-417-3). http://hdl.handle.net/1871/51333
- Hans W. Giessen & Heinz Helmut Lüger (2024), « Michel Bréal, L’homme qui a inventé le Marathon ». In: Alexandre Farnoux, Violaine Jeammet, Christina Mitsopoulou (Eds.) (2024), L’Olympisme, une invention moderne, un héritage antique. Paris: Éditions du Louvre, Hazan. 26–33, ISBN 978-2754113830. (Catalogue of the exhibition at the Louvre in Paris).
