= Hagi =

Hagi, Hadži, or Hadzhi (Хаджи) is a name derived from either hajji, an honorific title given to a Muslim person who has successfully completed the Hajj to Mecca, which was later adopted by Christian peoples as a word for pilgrim. Or from the Greek vowel prefix hagi- coming from hágios, meaning holy, sacred.

Hagia Sophia, Church of God's Holy Wisdom (Greek: Ναὸς τῆς Ἁγίας τοῦ Θεοῦ Σοφίας, romanized: Naòs tês Hagías toû Theoû Sophías)

== People ==
=== Surname ===
- Dimitri Atanasescu Hagi Sterjio (1836–1907), Aromanian teacher at the first Romanian school in the Balkans for the Aromanians
- Gheorghe Hagi (1965–), Romanian footballer and manager
- Kira Hagi (1996–), daughter of Gheorghe Hagi and Romanian actress
- Ianis Hagi (1998–), son of Gheorghe Hagi and Romanian footballer
- Jovan Hadži (1884–1972), zoologist
- Yordan Hadzhikonstantinov-Dzhinot (1818–1882), Bulgarian teacher and author
- Mihali Adami Hagi (1754–1825), Aromanian scholar, better known as Daniel Moscopolites

=== Given name ===
- Hadzhi Dimitar, (1840–1868), Bulgarian revolutionary
- Hadzhi Hristo (1821–1829), Bulgarian revolutionary (bg)
- Hadži Mustafa Pasha (1733–1801), Ottoman commander
- Hadži-Prodan (1760–1825), Serbian voivode

== Other ==
- Japanese bush clover or Lespedeza
- Hagi, Yamaguchi, a city in Japan
  - Hagi ware, a type of pottery originating in Hagi
- Japanese destroyer Hagi

== See also ==
- Hajji (name)
- Hadji
- Hajji (disambiguation)
- Hatzi
- Hadžić
- Hadzhiev
- Hadžići
