= Hajji (name) =

Hajji (also transliterated as Haji, Hadji, or Hacı (Turkish), or Xaaji (Somali) Arabic: حجي) is a common Arabic title meaning "one who has completed the Hajj to Mecca". It is also often used as a given name or surname.

Hajji may refer to:

== Given name ==
- Haji (1946–2013), Canadian actress
- Haji Abdulwahab, Muslim leader
- Haji Ally (born 1968), Tanzanian boxer
- Haji Bashir Ismail Yusuf, Somali politician
- Haji Bektash Veli (1209–1271), Islamic mystic, humanist and philosopher
- Haji Gokool Meah, an industrialist and philanthropist
- Haji Mohammad Suharto, the second President of Indonesia
- Haji Wright (born 1998), American footballer
- Hajji Alejandro (1954–2025), Filipino singer and actor
- Hajji Firuz, the traditional herald of Nowruz
- Hajji Muhammad, Khan of the Golden Horde
- Hajji Zayn al-Attar, 14th century Persian physician
- Hajji Zeynalabdin Taghiyev, Azeri industrial magnate and philanthropist
- Elhadjy Madior N'Diaye (born 1983), Senegalese footballer
- Haji Mastan (1926–1994), Indian organized crime leader

== Surname ==
- Bilal Hajji, songwriter and producer
- Ishtiyaque Haji, American philosopher
- Michalis Hajigiannis (born 1979), Cypriot singer-songwriter
- Mohamed Yusuf Haji, Somali politician
- Osman Haji, Somali politician
- Seamus Haji (born 1968), music producer
- Stelios Haji-Ioannou (born 1967), Cypriot entrepreneur

== See also ==
- Hajj (disambiguation)
- Hadji (disambiguation)
- Hagi
- Hadzhiev
- Harj (given name)
