= Hiba Kawas =

Lebanese operatic soprano, composer, and academic

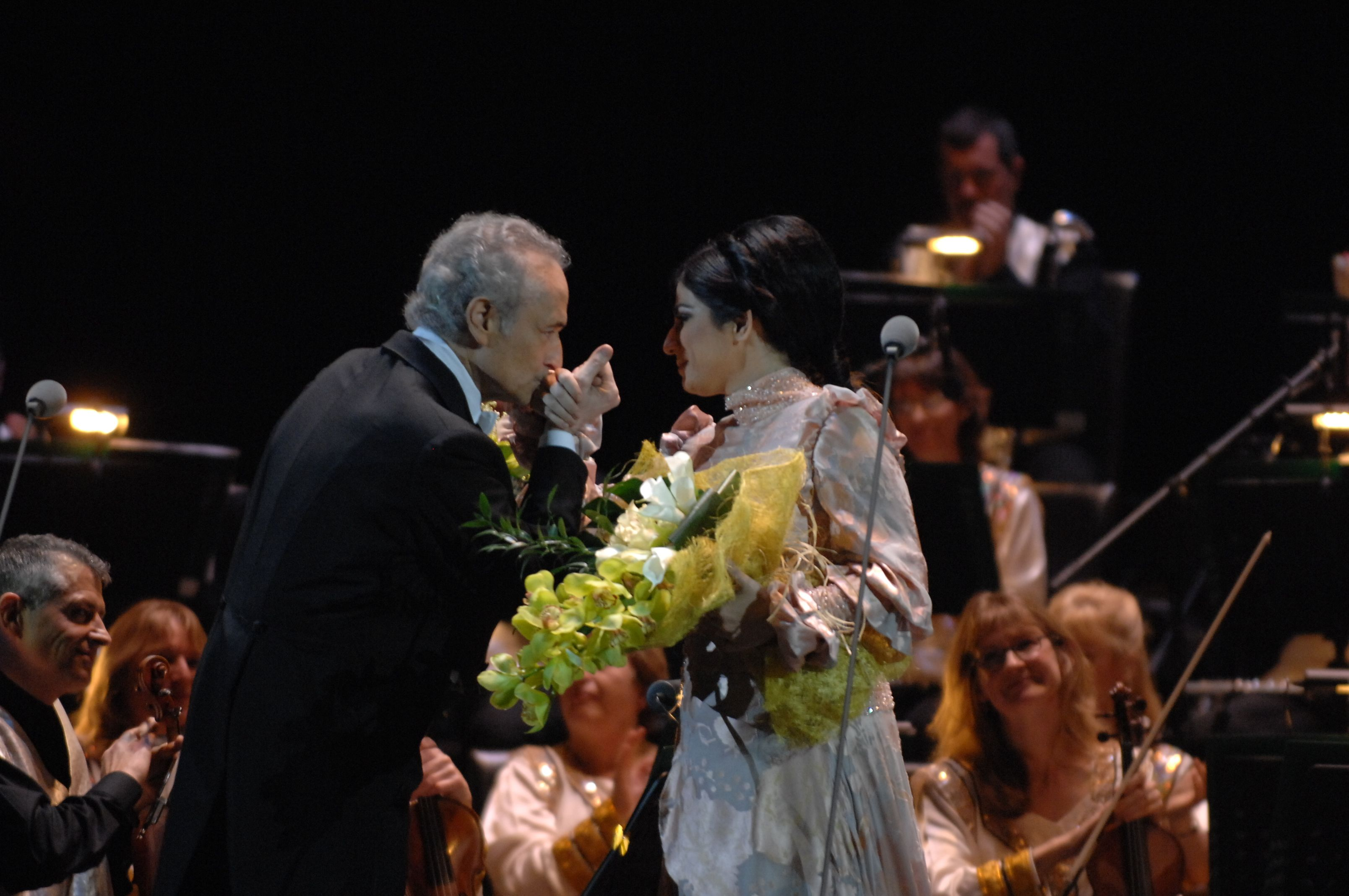
Hiba Al Kawas and Spanish opera-singer José Carreras, November 2006

Hiba Al Kawas (Arabic: هبة القواس; born 17 July 1972) is a Lebanese operatic soprano, composer and academic.

== BIography ==
Hiba Al Kawas was born on 17 July 1972 in Sidon, Lebanon, to a Sunni Muslim family.

== Career ==
=== Composer ===
Hiba Al Kawas has recorded 21 works of her own composition with the Dnipropetrovsk Symphony Orchestra-Ukraine under the direction of Vyacheslav Blinov, and 10 works with the Kraków Academy of Music Symphony Orchestra, under the direction of Wojciech Czepiel. She has recorded 13 works with The National Symphony Orchestra of Ukraine and the National Choir of Kyiv conducted by Vladimir Sirenko. In 2000, participated as a composer in the Kraków Contemporary Composition Festival, where the Kraków chamber Orchestra played her Aspiration No.1 conducted by Wojceich Czepiel. At her second appearance at the festival, her composition Moments in Krakow was given its world premiere by the Kraków Academy of Music conducted Symphony Orchestra, conducted by Wojceich Czepiel. Her orchestral work, Pleusis 1, which was premiered in 2000 by the Lebanese National Symphony Orchestra conducted by Harout Fazlian and by Wojciech Czepiel, has been played by the City of London Sinfonia, Cairo Symphony Orchestra, Kraków Symphony Orchestra, Bolshoi State Theatre Symphony Orchestra.

On 14 October 2007, her composition Rou'ia fi Maa received its première at the Opéra Bastille in Paris. The work comprises five instrumental and three song pieces based on Arabic poems by Nada El Hage. It was commissioned by the Festival d'Automne for contemporary music and performed by the Neuwe Ensemble of Amsterdam with Al Kawas singing the soprano solos. In November 2007 a short musical film Noor - Lady Light was produced using Hiba Al Kawas' song Asra Biqalbi which is based on a poem by Abdel Aziz Khoja.

=== Concert artist ===
She performed at the opening ceremony of Tyre festival in Lebanon and the Al-Medina Festival in Tunis. On 30 November 2006, Hiba Al Kawas performed along with José Carreras in Dubai at the second anniversary of the Dubai International Financial Centre, accompanied by the City of London Sinfonia Orchestra, conducted by David Giménez Carreras and Brad Cohen. She performed songs of her own composition and sang a duet with Carreras, "All I Ask of You" from The Phantom of the Opera. On 19 February 2007 Al Kawas sang several of her compositions in the presence of President Jacques Chirac at the IMA in Paris. She dedicated her song O Liban soit sauvé! (composed to the poetry of Nada El Hage) to President Chirac and the memory of Rafic Hariri. On 2 April 2008, Al Kawas closed the 5th Abu Dhabi Music and Art Festival, accompanied by Bolshoi Theatre Symphony Orchestra. Several of her compositions inspired by Andalusian music were premiered at the Festival with José María Gallardo Del Rey on guitar. On 21 April 2008, she presented a music, poetry, and meditation evening, "The Sound of a Peaceful Heart", with Dadi Janki, the head of Brahma Komaris University, and the poets Hoda Naamani and Nada El Hage. On 19 June 2008 she performed her songs in London with the Nieuw Ensemble, Amsterdam, at the Cadogan Hall.

== Compositions ==
=== Instrumental ===
For symphony orchestra

- Ilaik (Overture), (1995)
- Pleusis No.1 in 3 movements, (2000) - Dedicated to Mrs. Nazik Hariri, in recognition of her support and patronage and played for the first time by the Lebanese National Symphony Orchestra conducted by Harout Fazlian.
- Moments In Krakow (Overture), (2002)
- Baina Nahrain, (2004) - Commissioned by Al Jazeera television.
- In the Path of Light, (2008)
- Beiteddine (Overture), (2010)

For string orchestra

- Aspiration No.1, (1999)

For the Neuwe Ensemble

- Sada Al Akwan, (2005)
- Rou'ia Fi Maa', (2007)

Octets

- Wajd, (1994)

Trios

- Those days, (1995)

Duets for oud and piano

- Itab, (1997)

For piano

- Love Hurts, (1990)
- Faragh, (1991)
- Rhapsody For Piano, (2005)

=== Vocal ===
Arabic arias for soprano, choir and symphony orchestra

- Ma Asani Aqoulu, poetry by Houda Naamani, (1995)
- Unshoudat Al Matar, poetry by Badr Shaker Assaiiab, (1995)
- Ode to Peace, poetry by Houda Naamani, (2000)
- To Saida, poetry by Hamza Abboud, (2000)
- Qalbi Yuhaddithuni, poetry by Ibn El Farid, (2003)
- Salam El Hurriya, poetry by Nada El Hage, (2005) - Dedicated to the memory of the late Lebanese Prime Minister, Rafic El Hariri. This composition was also produced as a musical film by Milad Tawq.
- Ya Ayyuha El Ati Mina Zzaman, poetry by Henry Zgheib, (2005)
- Liajli Lubnan, poetry by Houda Naamani, (2005)
- O Liban Soit Sauvé, poetry by Nada El Hage, (2007)

Arabic arias for soprano and symphony orchestra

- Arousa Asharq, poetry by Souheil Al Kawas, (1989)
- Tashkou Thalam Allail, poetry by Mohammed Bin Ahmed Al Souweidi, (1994)
- Laallaka Tushiluha Thata Yawm, poetry by Ounsi El Hage, (1994)
- Liajlika, poetry by Houda Naamani, (1995)
- Being you being me, poetry by Houda Naamani, (1995)
- Hatta Law Inhalat Eshshams, poetry by Houda Naamani, (1995)
- Intu Nsitouna, poetry bu Mohammed Bin Ahmed Al Souweidi, (1996)
- Tabqa Li, poetry by Ounsi El hage, (1997)
- Dummani, poetry by Houda Naamani, (1998)
- Aiqithni Thaniatan, poetry by Houda Naamani, (1998)
- Wa Tuhibbuni, poetry by Houda Naamani, (1999)
- Lakaannaka, poetry by Houda Naamani, (1999)
- Yaduka, poetry by Houda Naamani, (2000)
- Arda, poetry by Nada El Hage, (2001)
- La Arifu Baitan Siwah, poetry by Nada El Hage, (2001)
- Lianni Ahya, poetry by Nada El Hage, (2002)
- Araftu Beirut, poetry by Hussa, (2002)
- Biekfi Twaddeni, poetry by Ragheda Mahfouz, (2003)
- Ashamamta Itri, poetry by Nada El Hage, (2005)
- Fi Biladi, poetry by Nada El Hage, (2006)
- Intel Hawa, poetry by Mohammed bin Rashid Al Maktoum, (2006)
- Asra Biqalbi, poetry by Abdel Aziz Khoja, (2007)
- Habibi, poetry by Abdel Aziz Khoja, (2008)
- Njom Eddini Binaik, poetry by Nada El Hage, (2008)
- Sawti ya Ssamma, poetry by Zahi Wehbi, (2008)

Arabic arias for soprano and orchestra

- Zaman Ghaddar, poetry by Hiba Al Kawas, (1982)
- Ours Saida, poetry by Hiba AL Kawas, (1984)
- Ana Man Youhibba Al Anjouma, poetry by Omar Abu Risha, (1985)
- Min La Makan, poetry by Abdel Wahab El Baiati, (1986)
- Min El Qalb Bisrakh Sawt, poetry by Ragheda Mahfouz, (1988)
- Ilna Haq Bdaw Eshshams, poetry by Ragheda Mahfouz, (1988)
- Blahfit Whanin Ettair, poetry by Ragheda Mahfouz, (1988)
- Oughannika Habibi, poetry by Ounsi El Hage, (1992)
- Awwal Essafar, poetry by Adonis, (1992)
- Sarraq El Omr, poetry by Talal Haidar, (1992)
- Abda'u min Raqmin Yamshi, poetry by Hamza Abboud, (1992)
- Ya Naseema El Reeh, poetry by Al Hallaj, (2005)

Arabic arias for soprano and piano

- Lashou Jina, poetry by Ragheda Mahfouz, (1988)
- Boukra Btikbari, poetry by Raghed Mahfouz, (1988)
- Limatha Nuhawilu Hatha Assafar, poetry by Mahmoud Darwish, (1992)
- Min Ghiabika La Yahda'u Ellail, poetry by Hamza Abboud, (1996)

== Honors and awards ==
- On 22 January 2007 Hiba Al Kawas received the decoration from Sultān Qaboos bin Said al Said, The Golden Order of Sultan Qaboos for Culture, Science and Art.
- In July 2003, a postage stamp with her name and picture was published in Lebanon.
- Received the Lebanon Creativity Award (2003).
- Received the Seal Of Beirut (2001).
- Presented with the Seal of the American University of Beirut Alumni (1998).
- Received the Seal of the Lebanese American University Alumni of Abu Dhabi (1993).

== Sources ==
- Artist's Biography: Hiba Al Kawas 5th Abu Dhabi Music and Arts Festival
- Rainer Hermann, "Sängerin Hiba al Kawas: Ich habe Beirut gekannt", Frankfurter Allgemeine, June 2, 2008.
- Opera de Bastille
- 5th Festival Finale with Hiba Al Kawas, José María Gallardo Del Rey and the Bolshoi Theatre Orchestra
- The National Interview with Hiba Al Kawas
- Festival d'automne
