= Hacı =

Hacı is the Turkish spelling of the title and epithet Hajji. It may refer to:

== People ==
- Hacı I Giray (died 1466), founder and the first ruler of the Crimean Khanate
- Hacı Ahmet (fl. 1566), purported Turkish cartographer
- Hacı Arap Yaman (born 1965), Turkish carom billiards player
- Hacı Arif Bey (1831–1885), Turkish composer
- Hacı Arif Örgüç (1876–1940), Ottoman and Turkish military officer
- Hacı Bayram-ı Veli (1352–1430), Turkish poet
- Hacı Halil Efendi (died 1821), Ottoman Sheikh ul-Islam
- Hacı İlbey (c. 1305–1371), Ottoman military commander
- Hacı İvaz Mehmet Pasha (died 1743), Ottoman grand vizier
- Hacı Karay (1950–1994), Turkish drug trafficker
- Hacı Mehmet Zorlu (1919–2005), Turkish businessman
- Hacı Ömer Sabancı (1906–1966), Turkish entrepreneur, founder of Sabancı Holding
  - Hacı Sabancı (1935–1998), Turkish businessman, his son
- Hacı Pasha (fl. 1348–1349), Ottoman grand vizier

== See also ==
- Hacı, İpsala
- Hajji (name)
