= Hajj (disambiguation) =

Hajj (or variant spellings) is an annual Islamic pilgrimage to Mecca.

Hajj may also refer to:

== People ==
=== Hajj ===
- Adnan Hajj, Lebanese freelance photographer
- Hajj Nematollah (1871–1920), Kurdish mystic
- Hussein Hajj Hassan (born 1960), Lebanese politician
- Francois Hajj (1953–2007), a Lebanese general

=== Al Hajj, El Hajj ===
- El Hajj Muhammad El Anka (1907–1978), Algerian chaabi musician
- Sami al Hajj (born 1969), Sudanese journalist for the Al Jazeera network
- Ounsi el- Hajj (1937–2014), Lebanese poet
- El-Hajj Al-Malik El Shabazz (1925–1965), the Muslim name of Malcolm X, American black nationalist and human rights activist
- Abdu Ali al Haji Sharqawi (born 1974), Yemeni detainee at the U.S. Guantanamo Bay detention camp in Cuba

=== Hadj ===
- Hadj (name)
- Hadj Boudella (born 1965), former detainee at the U.S. Guantanamo Bay detainment camp in Cuba

=== Al Hadj, El Hadj ===
- El Hadj Umar Tall (1794–1864), West African political leader, Islamic scholar, and military commander

== Other uses ==
- Al-Hajj, 22nd chapter (sūrah) of the Qur'an
- Hajj Qeshlaq, a village in Zanjan Province, Iran
- Hajj (album), 1986 album by Muslimgauze
- Hajj (film), 2013 Indian Kannada language film directed by Nikhil Manjoo

== See also ==
- Hage (disambiguation)
- Haj (disambiguation)
- Hajji, a Muslim person who has successfully completed the Hajj to Mecca
- Hajji (disambiguation)
