= Hajji (disambiguation) =

Hajji is an honorific title given to a Muslim person who has successfully completed the Hajj to Mecca.

Hajji or Haji may also refer to:

== People ==
- Haji (actress), a movie actress who starred in several Russ Meyer films
- Hajji (name)

== Other uses ==
- Hajji, Iran, a village in Sistan and Baluchestan Province, Iran
- Haji Ali Dargah, a mosque off the coast of Worli in Southern Mumbai
- Hajji Firuz Tepe, a Neolithic complex
- Haji, a character in the anime series Blood+
- Haji, a character in the 1960s television series I Dream of Jeannie
- Haji, the Japanese word for shame
- Haji pilgrimage to the Holy Kabah

== See also ==
- Hagi (disambiguation)
- Hadji (disambiguation)
- Hajj (disambiguation)
