= Madior =

Madior may refer to:

- Mame Madior Boye (born 1940), former Prime Minister of Senegal
- Madior Diouf (1939–2025), Senegalese politician
- Elhadjy Madior N'Diaye (born 1983), Senegalese football (soccer) defender
