= Qaitouli =

Qaitouli قيتولي Kaitouli
- Municipality
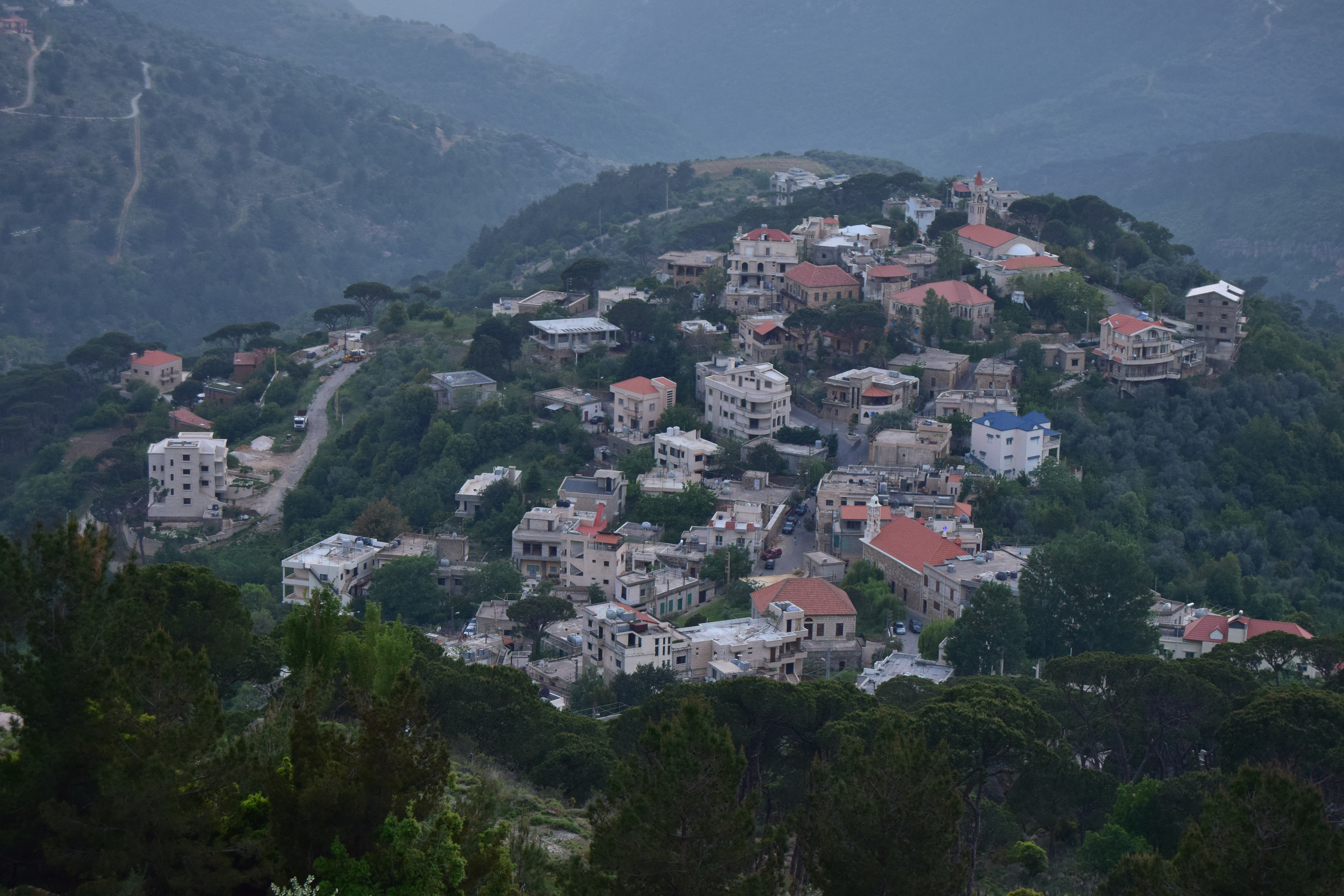
- The Lebanese municipality of Qaitouli as it looks from the Haitoura – Jezzine road.

- Location in Lebanon
- Coordinates: 33°32′15″N 35°33′07″E
- Country: Lebanon
- Governorate: South Governorate
- District: Jezzine District
- Elevation: 950 m (3,120 ft)
- Distance from the Capital Beirut: 72 km

Qaitouli (Arabic: قيتولي, romanized: Qaytūlī) is a municipality in the Jezzine District of South Governorate in Lebanon. Qaitouli is about 72 km from the capital Beirut.

== Etymology ==
Qaitouli come from a Syriac word which means "Gods residence".

== Demographics ==
In 2014, Christians made up 99.00% of registered voters in Qaitouli. 64.11% of the voters were Maronite Catholics and 29.51% were Greek Catholics.

== Monuments ==
Monuments in Qaitouli include Mar Mikhael (Saint Michael) ancient church (built around 1811), heritage houses, an old press, ruins of an old press, and that of old mills.

== Natural attractions ==
A visitor to the area can find human traces in the nature such as coal quarries and mines, and purely natural spots including the Mar Gergess (Saint George) spring, the Al-Houwwa (Arabic for pit) in the area of Dahr Al-Makla'a, and the pine woods dispersed around the village.

== Developmental projects ==
Of the developmental projects that are helping Qaitouli:

- The UNDP GEF Carob Project
- The Baladi Program chocolate production workshop funded by the USAID

== Geology ==
From a geological point of view, the land of Qaitouli is principally made of sediments that originate from the event of the formation of the Mount Lebanon where parts of the crust was raised from below the Mediterranean Sea to elevations reaching 3,088 m at the Qurnat as Sawda'.

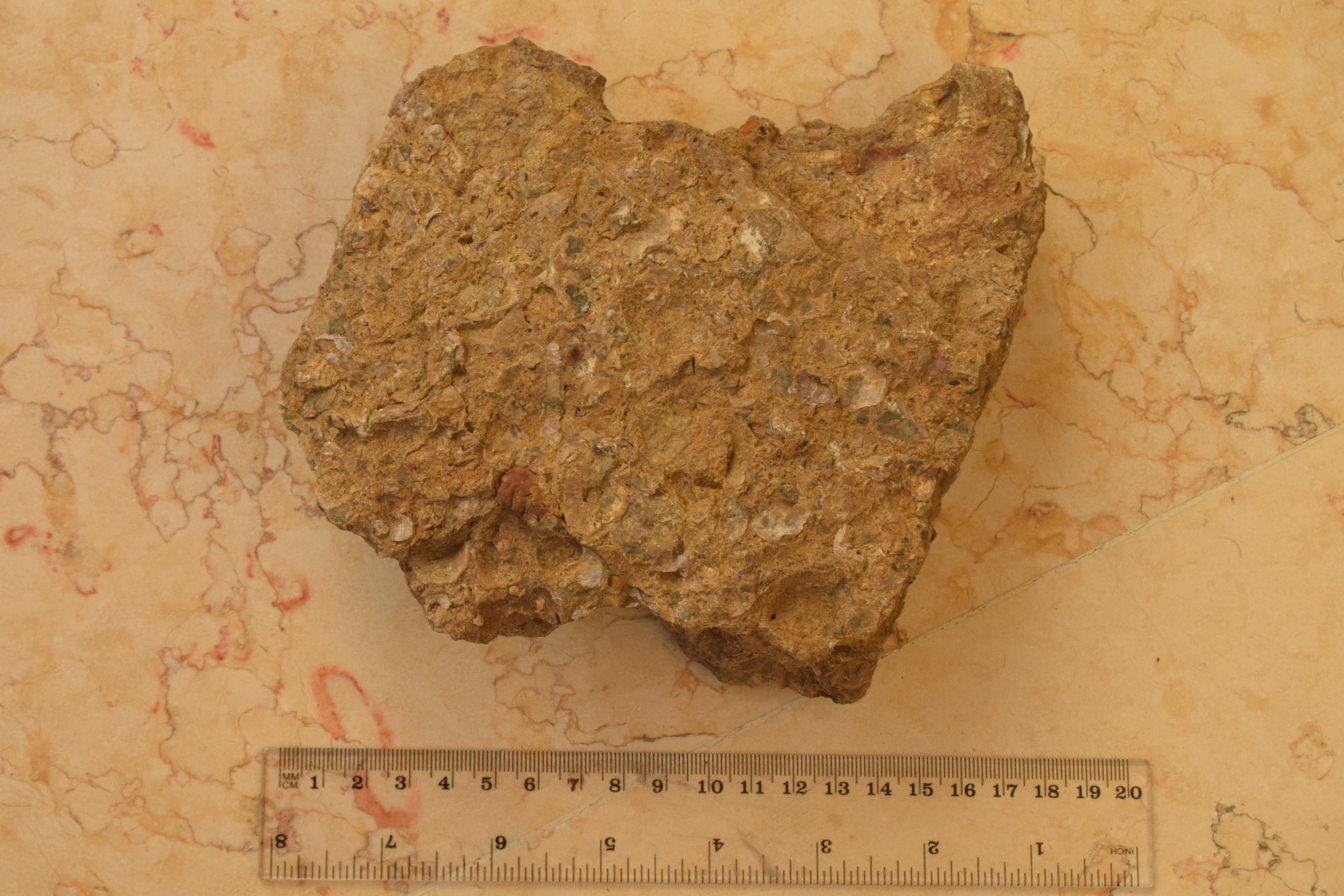
Sedimentary rocks found in Kaitouly and containing fossiled marine creatures

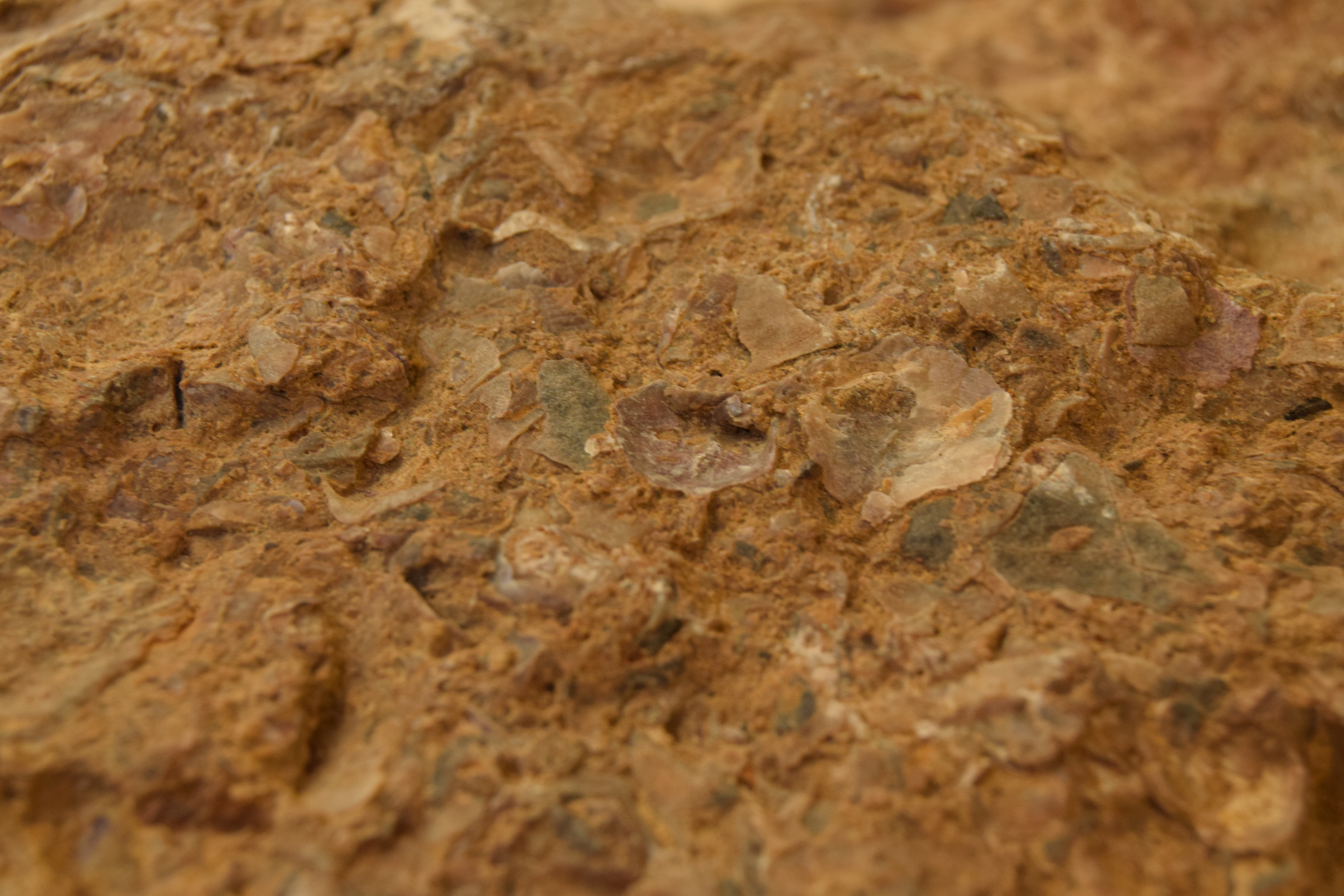
A close-up view of sedimentary rock above showing remains of seashells

== Notable people ==
- Ounsi el-Hajj - Poet
- Hector Hajjar - Minister of Social Affairs

== See also ==
- List of municipalities of Lebanon
