= Hatzidakis =

Hatzidakis or Hadjidakis (Greek: Χατζηδάκης or Χατζιδάκις) is a Greek surname, a diminutive of Hatzis:

- Georgios Hatzidakis (1843–1941), Greek linguist
- Hatzidakis (athlete), shooter in the 1896 Olympics
- Ioannis Hatzidakis (1844–1921), Greek mathematician
- Kostis Hatzidakis (born 1965), Greek conservative politician
- Manos Hatzidakis (1925–1994), Greek composer
- Nikolaos Hatzidakis (1872–1942), Greek mathematician
