= Hage (disambiguation) =

Hage is a small East Frisian town in Lower Saxony, Germany.

Hage or Håge may also refer to:

== Places ==
- Hage (Randen), a mountain in the Swiss canton of Schaffhausen
- Hage (Samtgemeinde), a collective municipality in Lower Saxony, Germany, containing the town Hage
- Hage Station, a railway station in Nishitosahage, Shimanto-shi, Kōchi Prefecture, Japan.

== People ==
- Hage Geingob (1941–2024), the third President of Namibia
- Alfred Hage (1803–1872), Danish merchant, politician, landowner and philanthropist.
- Brett Hage (born 1974), American politician
- Christopher Friedenreich Hage (1759–1849), Danish merchant on the island of Møn
- Chucrallah-Nabil El-Hage (born 1943), archeparch of the Maronite Catholic church
- Daisy Hage (born 1993), Dutch handball player
- Douglas Håge (1898–1959), Swedish actor
- Gerhard Häge (1928/29–1970), West German rower
- Ghassan Hage (born 1957), Lebanese-Australian academic
- Gilbert Hage (born 1966), Lebanese photographer
- Heleen Hage (born 1958), Dutch road racing cyclist
- Jens Friedenreich Hage (1752–1831), Danish merchant and landowner
- Johannes Hage (1842–1923), Danish businessman and philanthropist
- Letícia Hage (born 1990), Brazilian volleyball player
- Marwan Hage (born 1981), Canadian football player
- Michael Hage (born 2006), Canadian ice hockey player
- Moussa El-Hage (born 1954), Maronite Catholic archbishop
- Nour Hage (born 1988), Lebanese fashion designer
- Per Hage (1935–2004), American anthropologist
- Rawi Hage (born 1964), Lebanese-Canadian writer and photographer
- Salma Hage (born 1942), Lebanese author and cook
- Steve Hage (born 1954), Australian rugby league footballer
- Volker Hage (1949–2026), German journalist, author and literary critic
- Javier El-Hage (fl. 2000s), Bolivian attorney in the U.S.
- Nada El Hage (fl. from 1988), Lebanese poet, writer and journalist
- Wadih el-Hage (born 1960), Lebanese convicted terrorist
- Youhanna Fouad El-Hage (1939–2005), Lebanese archeparch of the Maronite Catholic church

== See also ==
- Hague (disambiguation)
- Hajj (disambiguation)
