= Apostolou =

Apostolou (Greek: Αποστόλου) is a Greek surname. It is the surname of:

- Evangelos Apostolou (born 1949), Greek politician and government minister
- Georgia Apostolou (born 1966), Greek actress
- Ilektra Apostolou (1912–1944), Greek feminist and member of the Greek resistance
- Jenny Apostolou, Greek-Australian actress
