= Hadžić =

Hadžić is a Bosnian surname, derived from the word hadži (hajji), referring to pilgrims to Mecca. Its bearers are predominantly Bosniaks. It may refer to:

- Adnan Hadzic (born 1999), Norwegian footballer
- Aida Hadžić (born 1992), Bosnian footballer
- Alen Hadzic (born 1991), American fencer banned for life for sexual misconduct
- Anel Hadžić (born 1989), Bosnian footballer
- Antonije Hadžić (1831–1916), playwright and theatre director
- Azra Hadzic (born 1994), Australian tennis player
- Bahrija Nuri Hadžić (1904–1993), Bosnian soprano
- Benjamin Hadžić (born 1999), German-born Bosnian footballer
- Damir Hadžić (born 1978), Bosnian footballer
- Damir Hadžić (born 1984), Slovenian footballer
- Eldin Hadžić (born 1991), Bosnian footballer
- Elvir Hadžić (born 1999), Bosnian footballer
- Emir Hadžić (born 1984), Bosnian footballer
- Fadil Hadžić (1922–2011), Bosnian playwright, journalist and filmmaker (born in eastern Herzegovina)
- Goran Hadžić (1958–2016), Croatian Serb general died during trial for crimes against humanity and war crimes
- Hakija Hadžić (1883–1953), Herzegovinian Muslim politician
- Irfan Hadžić (born 1993), Bosnian footballer
- Ismet Hadžić (1954–2015), Bosnian footballer
- Jovan Hadžić (1799–1869), Serbian writer and legislator
- Kenan Hadžić (born 1994), Croatian footballer of Bosniak origin
- Memnun Hadžić (born 1981), Bosnian boxer
- Nasiha Kapidžić-Hadžić (1932–1995), Bosnian children's author and poet
- Nedim Hadžić (born 1999), Bosnian footballer
- Olga Hadžić (1946–2019), Serbian mathematician
- Osman Nuri Hadžić (1869–1937), Bosnian intellectual and writer
- Osman Hadžić (born 1966), Bosnian folk singer
- Sabit Hadžić (1957–2018), Bosnian basketball player
- Safet Hadžić (1968), Slovenian football manager
- Stevan Hadžić (1868–1931), Serbian general
- Tarik Hadžić (born 1994), alpine skier from Montenegro

== See also ==
- Hatzi, Greek surname
- Hagi (disambiguation), Romanian surname
- Hadžići (disambiguation), plural form used in toponymy
