= Thanasis Hatzis =

Greek communist leader (1905–1982)

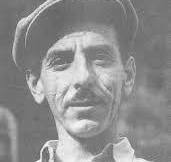
- Hatzis ca. late 1944

EAM Secretary General
- In office September 1941 – August 1944
- Preceded by: Lefteris Apostolou
- Succeeded by: Dimitris Partsalidis

Personal details
- Born: 1905 Amyntaion, Florina, Greece
- Died: 16 November 1982 (aged 76–77) Athens, Greece
- Resting place: First Cemetery of Athens
- Party: Communist Party of Greece
- Education: Athens University
- Occupation: Dentist

Thanasis Hatzis (Gr: Θανάσης Χατζῆς, 1905-1982) was a Greek communist activist and Resistance fighter during the Axis occupation of Greece, serving during that period as EAM's Secretary General, and then a Democratic Army combatant in the Greek Civil War.

== Early years, education, and involvement in politics ==
Ηatzis was born in 1905 in Amyntaion, Florina, of Ottoman-ruled Macedonia, into an agrarian family, involved at the time in the armed battles of local Greeks against Bulgarian nationalists. Their participation in the armed conflict led to the family's exile by the Ottoman authorities to Salonica. While in high school, Hatzis participated in students' demonstrations in support of the railroad workers' major strike of 1925 (Note: In March 1925, railway workers in Greece, demanding better pay and decrease in overtime hours, went on strike, significantly disrupting transportation. See Panourgiá (2009)) and is arrested for breach of the peace. His brother-in-law, a deputy commander of the Hellenic Military Academy, confined Hatzis, as a disciplinary measure, in the academy's grounds, from where Hatzis escaped. He was subsequently drafted into the disciplinary unit of Kalpaki military camp and completed his service there. He moved to Athens and enrolled in the university, wherefrom he obtained his degree in dentistry.

At the university, Hatzis joined the youth wing of the Communist Party of Greece and agitated in numerous students' demonstrations, occupations of buildings, and strikes during the period from1929 until 1933. He was arrested and sentenced to five years in prison and internal exile. After an early release, he continued to participate and instigate political activities in the city and was arrested again by the dictatorial regime and imprisoned in Akronafplia. On account of his "strong" political activity, even while serving his prison sentence, Hatzis rose in the party hierarchy.

== Axis invasion of Greece, 1940-41 ==
On 29 October 1940, Mussolini's Italy declared war on Greece and attacked through Greece's northern borders from Albania, then under Italian occupation. Hatzis was conscripted and dispatched to serve as a military doctor lieutenant at the Korytsa front, where he immediately took part in the battles on mount Ivan. On 6 January 1941, he was seriously wounded from mortar fire, while taking part in an attack. After convalescing, he was sent back to the Albanian front, where he took part in the defense against the invading German units; soon after, the Greek government capitulated. After failing to convince officers and enlisted men to form guerilla bands in the northern mountains, Hatzis returned to Athens.

== The National Liberation Front ==
=== Birth of EAM ===
In July 1941, the Communist Party proclaimed the "urgent need" for armed resistance and the "national and social liberation of Greece." (Note: Following the 1939 signing of the Molotov–Ribbentrop Pact and until the German attack against the Soviet Union, the Comintern line was that the war was an "internal conflict between imperialist countries" and the communist parties were not to condemn German aggression. See McDermott, Kevin; Agnew, Jeremy (1996). The Comintern: A History of International Communism from Lenin to Stalin. London: Macmillan Press. ISBN 978-0-333-55284-1. See Braunthal, Julius (1980). History of the International, Volume 3: 1943–1968. London, U.K.: Victor Gollancz Ltd. ISBN 0-575-02650-2.)

Some six months later, in January 1942, the Central Committee's directives were even more pressing, demanding from the cadres "every effort" to organize a resistance movement "everywhere," starting from the countryside. Nonetheless, there were little results of practical significance, the reason for which some historians have assigned to the party's reluctance to endorse movements and organizations not entirely under its control. The situation in German and Italian-occupied Greece, therefore, remained mostly peaceful, to the point that the commander of the Italian occupation forces in Greece could report in May 1943 that the past twelve months had been without "any events that could be characterized as threatening the security of the troops or the population." (Note: On the contrary, in Bulgarian-occupied North Greece, the September 1941 Drama uprising, which the Bulgarian forces put down after a "bloodbath," would register the very violent character of the struggle in that region, for the remainder of the war and beyond.)

Οn 27 September 1941, representatives of the Communist party, the Socialist Party, the People's Democracy Union, and the Agrarian Party held a clandestine meeting in Athens to discuss and agree on the creation of a resistance alliance, to be called Ethnikó Apeleftherotikó Métopo (National Liberation Front). (Note: There have been numerous attempts to organize a resistance organization before EAM, yet almost all of them were either not successful or achieved very little. The pre-EAM resistance group with the most impact in North Greece was Eleftheria (Freedom) in Salonica, an alliance between the Communists, the Socialists, the Agrarians, the Democratic Union, and colonel Dimitris Psarros, later of 5/42 Evzones Regiment fame. The alliance began distributing a news pamphlet widely around the city but eventually did not make much progress. See Marantzidis (2023) p.202. In Crete, the nationalist organization Supreme Committee of Cretan Struggle was created in June 1941, almost immediately after the island's conquest by the Germans; it would eventually become EOK with substantial armed strength.) Preparatory contacts undertaken with other parties and politicians, prominent among whom was Themistoklis Sofoulis, inviting them to participate in EAM, had failed. Pre-war non-leftists parliamentarians were instructed by the Greek government-in-exile, led by Liberal party's Emmanouil Tsouderos, to stay clear of resistance activity and, in particular, to refrain from joining any resistance groupings; they were to await developments and instructions from the exiled government.

Lefteris Apostolou, a prominent communist activist and KKE member, who represented the party at the inaugural meeting, was elected EAM's General Secretary. (Note: Lefteris was the older brother of Ilektra Apostolou, also a member of EAM, who was arrested, tortured and executed by the Gestapo in 1944.) Ιn September 1942, philosopher and politician Dimitris Glinos, a long-time KKE member, wrote and EAM distributed widely the front's political and social manifesto, titled What EAM is and wants. Within two months, Apostolou was arrested by the authorities for "insurrectionist activities" and imprisoned, (Note: Apostolou would remain imprisoned until September 1943, when he escaped and joined the antartes of ELAS. See ASKI (2007)) and, in November 1941, Thanasis Hatzis was elected General Secretary, replacing him. Hatzis was a firm supporter of armed reaction to the occupation and consistently proclaimed that a people's resistance would be the germ of a "new authority" that would demand consummation, the germ of a revolution for "people's power".

In 1942, Hatzis married Heró Hadjimarkou, and they had a son.

=== The famine ===
The first official communiqué by EAM called on all officers of the Greek armed forces, whether serving or retired, to join the resistance and assist with their "knowledge, experience, and proven daring" in the organization of "national-liberation forces."Relatively few officers heeded the call, since most were conservative politically if not outright anti-communist; some chose to leave the country and join the Greek forces that had been reformed and stationed in Egypt, under the command of the British army, while others stayed in Greece without getting involved in the resistance and awaiting the war's denouement. More immediate was the task of confronting the catastrophe of mass starvation that hit most major cities, and particularly Athens, starting from the winter of 1941/42. The corruption and systemic inadequacy of the state authorities significantly deteriorated an already dire situation, born out from both the lack of preparations for such an event and the Occupation authorities seizing extraordinary quantities of foodstuff. Even the German community of Athens suffered from malnutrition. This led the population in the affected cities, and mainly in Athens, to start initiatives of food collection and exchange; oftentimes, local EAM representatives would take over the state's food giveaways, since they were accepted as honest, as opposed to the state's corrupt officialdom. EAM cells initiated, organized, and expanded the feeding activities, an achievement that, although it lessened and not eliminated the famine's impact, (Note: It has been estimated that some 40-45,000 Athenians died from the famine during the winter of 1941-42. See p.82 in Charalambidis (2012), citing studies.) it significantly expanded EAM's popularity among the general population. EAM's endeavors under the direction of Hatzis included, importantly, contacts with members of the Occupation forces as well as the state's apparatus who would be prepared to sell or exchange items for food. These contacts were also meant to progress and, more often than not, eventually progressed to buying from such personnel pistols and ammunition but also other materiel.

Τhe famine in combination with the state's inability to address the catastrophe and the voluntary mobilization of local communities towards providing food had a widespread radicalizing effect on large swaths of the population - and, in particular, young people, including apolitical or conservative persons. The effect was felt practically everywhere in the country. The ranks of EAM began to swell in a manner that did not conform to the conspiratorial rules of the Communist Party, a success, tellingly, that many cadres did not appreciate enough. Hatzis, being a long time cadre, understood the issue of mass conscription into EAM as significant and understandably worrying for the veteran communists of KKE and addressed it quite strongly, eventually convincing the leadership of the necessity, by definition, to follow different, less severe rules for entry into EAM.

=== Mass expansion ===
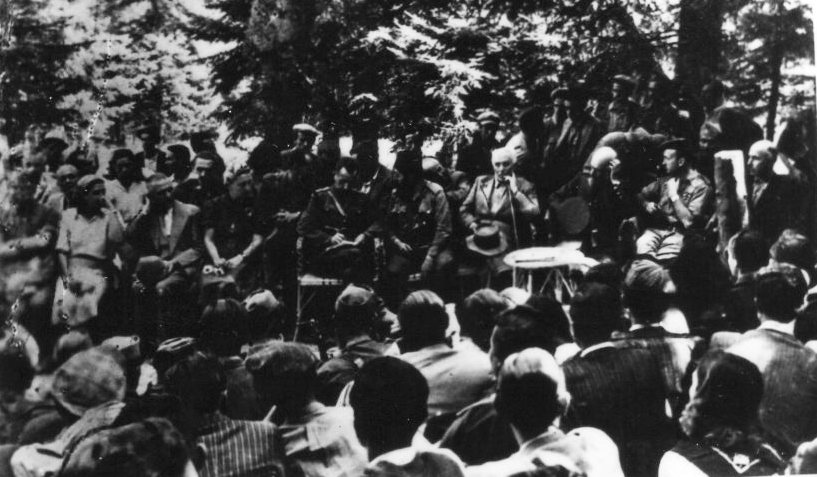
Open-air EAM assembly in Kastania, Trikala, 1944

Significant and numerous during 1943 were public expressions of civilian dissent, most often spontaneous, such as the mass protests against the government program of conscription of laborers to be sent to Germany, the funeral of "national poet" Kostis Palamas, in which the patriotic eulogy of poet Angelos Sikelianos incited a demonstration with cries against the Occupiers, or the Greek-flag carrying demonstration following the 25th March independence day, which was fired upon by Italian carabinieri; (Note: Τhe Italian armed forces in Athens were already on edge. Their celebration of the anniversary of Mussolini's March to Rome on the 23rd of March, was met with protests by Athenian citizens which infuriated the Italian authorities. See Mazower (2001).) the protests rendered the authority of the collaborationist government virtually non-existent, and EAM's Secretary brought forward measures to extent the organization's influence. The "enthusiasm" of protesting and agitating young people, in particular, enabled the unification of the most significant youth organizations into one single front, the Eniaia Panelladiki Organosi Neon (United Panhellenic Organization of Youth, or EPON from its initials in Greek), which was soon unofficially under the aegis of EAM. Notable for all observers, including the "astonished" state's authorities, was the "mass" participation in these political protests of young women, not only in urban areas, but even around the country, where the social norms had historically been quite strict.

Along with the work in the cities, EAM's leadership initiated a series of meetings and events around the country, where the locals were encouraged to participate without further obligation and freely express the issues they were facing, in particular because of the Occupation. The populace was encouraged to form "people's committees." Hatzis noted that this work was EAM's main course of infiltration into the poorer strata of Greek society, even into conservative milieus not particularly friendly to community action. Collateral efforts to attract members into EAM were initiated by its local cadres, in an effort supported by the leadership, among societal organizations already extant, such as the boy scouts, social clubs, athletic clubs, and others.

== EAM and ELAS ==
=== Armed resistance ===
In his subsequent criticism of KKE's decision-making "rigidity," Hatzis noted that, while the careful pragmatism, the experience in clandestine action, and the conspiratorial practices of the party's veterans were instrumental in the significant resurgence of its credibility among the population and in its organization of actions of dissent, these traits, at the same time, impeded a "rushed" turn towards armed action or social rebellion. In any case, the Communist Party, some weeks after EAM's creation, in early October 1941, called party members who were former Greek army officers in to a committee, the Military Center of Resistance, and assigned them the task of studying the necessary conditions and undertakings for the creation of organized, armed resistance against the Occupation and its domestic collaborators. EAM's Military Organization Committee, led by Hatzis, under the nom de guerre Amyntas, a reference to his birthplace, supported and contributed to the effort.

A number of armed bands had already sprang up in the country, in particular in mountainous regions, engaging in nominal resistance, some of them borne out of the initiative of local communists, while some of these bands took to plain banditry, all taking advantage of the state's inability to impose order. The explicit call by the Soviet leadership, in July 1941, for partisan action behind the lines of the Axis forces in occupied Europe had accelerated developments, though, in practical terms, the creation of ELAS (of Hellinikós Laïkós Apeleftherotikós Stratós, the Hellenic People's Liberation Army) was decided and announced on 16 February 1942, following the report submitted by Aris Velouchiotis, who is the first one to officially conscript people into an armed ELAS and lead them onto the mountains of Roúmeli. The name itself of the armed wing of the EAM resistance was decided, on 2 February 1942, in meeting most probably between four KKE Central Committee members among whom was Hatzis, while others claim that Velouchiotis was the one who added Apeleftherotikós (Liberatory), making the name a homophone to "Hellas" (Greece). Soon, a mainly EAM-fielded Central Committee of ELAS was established, in which EAM's main political representative was Hatzis, an instrument that inevitably and often was in disagreement on matters of military issues with the military officers of the General Command of ELAS.

After Italy's 1943 surrender, KKE created a Committee, with Hatzis a member, assigning to it the task of formulating a military plan for taking over Attica, "at the same time as or immediately after the Occupation forces leave (which is estimated to happen rather soon)," a decision subsequently confirmed by members of that group, such as Daniilidis, who noted that Makridis, the prominent military strategist in the committee, initially rejected the task arguing, "we cannot make a plan to fight with unknown forces against unknown forces," before eventually succumbing to the party's demand. Hatzis was a firm supporter of the plan's objective.

=== The Lebanon agreement ===
When the defeat of the Axis in Europe seemed certain, if not imminent, the belief among many KKE and ELAS cadres was that the Western Allies would attempt a landing in Greece. That perspective, firmly supported by KKE's Secretary General Siantos, was explicitly expressed in the resolutions of KKE's Central Committee 8th plenum, which was convened in January 1942, as the German armies were failing in their attack against Moscow. According to KKE's records, this also agreed with the information advanced to the party by its numerous informers from inside the state apparatus, including the security forces. Hatzis was critical of that "vague" and "unsupportable" view, and expressed his dissent in the plenum, later arguing that the adopted line significantly affected subsequent decisions by the communist leadership. (Note: The KKE view was shared even by the SOE commando team then operating in Greece, which they expressed both in their interactions with Greek partisans and civilians and in their memoirs, such as Eddie Myers'. See Farakos (2000a).) In his dissent he was strongly supported by the two most prominent at the time military officers working with EAM, Theodoros Makridis and Polydoros Daniilidis, the former of whom presented to the party specific and detailed objections against the hypothesis of an Allied landing in Eastern Europe; the presentation included estimates for the general prospects of the war in Europe, all of which were to prove accurate. (Note: Makridis was also adamant since practically the beginning of the resistance that the British would eventually attack ELAS by force and try to neutralize militarily and politically the left in Greece. See Ch.2 in Farakos (2000a).)

After the early 1943 mutiny of sections of the Greek Armed Forces, joined by the navy, stationed in Egypt and operating as part of British divisions, was put down, London demanded that all Greek forces, including both those "officially recognized" in the Middle East and the antartes in Greece be placed under Allied/British command. To that end, a conference was called one year later, in May 1944, a few weeks after the wholesale annihilation by ELAS forces of EKKA's nationalist partisans, led by Colonel Dimitrios Psarros, an exemplary republican officer, an event subsequently acknowledged to have been a "major and costly error" by most historians, including KKE and ELAS members. The conference began on 17 May 1944 in a mountain retreat outside Beirut, Lebanon, under the chairmanship of Georgios Papandreou. Taking part were representatives from the exiled Greek Government, headed by Papandreou himself, from the Liberal Party, the People's Party, the Communist Party through, and from smaller parties, as well as by representatives from EAM, EDES, and EKKA the political wing of the annihilated 5/42 Regiment. The subject was the security of post-liberation Greece. The agreement, reached after many days of negotiations, called for the following: The creation of a government of national unity, in which EAM would participate, with Papandreou as prime minister; the rebirth of the nation's Armed Forces, unique command, in which all partisan organizations, including ELAS, would be invited; the unequivocal condemnation of the Greek forces' mutiny in Egypt; and the prospect of a referendum about the future of the monarchy in Greece. When the KKE and ELAS representatives returned home, Hatzis expressed, in a meeting of the party's leadership, his strong disagreement, stating that the people they sent to Lebanon violated their mandate by agreeing to the final document's provisions. In this, he was joined by others, such as Yannis Zevgos and Bartziotas, who demanded that the party's representatives be censured, but the KKE politburo eventually approved the agreement, which was signed by all parties on 20 May 1944. Hatzis expressed his strong disagreement with the decision, joined in this by other members.

Moderates in the "government of the mountains", such as Ilias Tsirimokos or Alexandros Svolos, were openly suggesting that KKE's initially held intransigent stance was "removed from reality" and that the party needed to accept that Greece was within Britain's sphere of influence "with Stalin's acquiescence." Svolos' party held that KKE's Central Committee behaved more like a "factory strike committee." Hatzis was strongly opposed to their calls for restraint, mockingly referring to the "so-called spheres of influence" as something that Svolos enjoyed "chewing on." Hatzis, though, acknowledged that even a "hardliner" such as Yannis Ioannidis, PEEA minister and KKE Politburo member, agreed that the Resistance would eventually had to "deal with the British," who would not rely on the "subservience" of personalities, such as Papandreou, but promote at all costs their interests in the region.

One week later, on 28 May, Hatzis wrote an editorial in EAM's newspaper Eleftheri Ellada (Free Greece), in which he stated, breaking with the party's decision, that the government on the mountains of Greece formed by the Resistance was the only legitimate one; this was the first time such a statement was made by someone from the EAM/ELAS camp. A few weeks later, Hatzis submitted his resignation as EAM's General Secretary (he was replaced by Dimitrios Partsalidis) and as a member of KKE's politburo. Still a KKE member, Hatzis continued to object to the party's "acquiescence" to the "demands of the British and the forces of reaction," as he saw them, objecting even more strongly to the agreement that followed Lebanon. Subsequent historical research suggests an indirect yet decisive intervention by Moscow, "advising" the Greek communists to accept the Lebanon Agreement, as well as the following one, in messages conveyed through the Soviet embassy in Cairo as well as directly through the Soviet military emissary to Greece Lt-Colonel Grigory Popov, which led the KKE's leadership to reverse its initial "adamant" position, after many delays and hesitations, in August 1944, and accept a provisional government under Papandreou. (Note: German historian Matthias Esche, in his 1982 work on KKE, relates Komninos Pyromaglou's reminiscence about the Soviet mission. After the war, Pyromaglou, while in Moscow in 1958, met with Popov. The former member of the Soviet mission to Greece told him that "[the mission's] task was to make KKE enter the Papandreou government." Pyromaglou divulged publicly the alleged incident only in 1975. See Esche, Matthias (1982). Die Kommunistische Partei Griechenlands 1941-1949: Ein Beitrag zur Politik der KKE vom Beginn der Resistance bis zum Ende des Bürgerkriegs [The Communist Party of Greece, 1941–1949: A Study of KKE Policy from the Start of the Resistance to the End of the Civil War]. Studien zur modernen Geschichte [Studies in Modern History] (in German). Oldenbourg. ISBN 9783486509618.)

== Liberation and internecine conflict ==
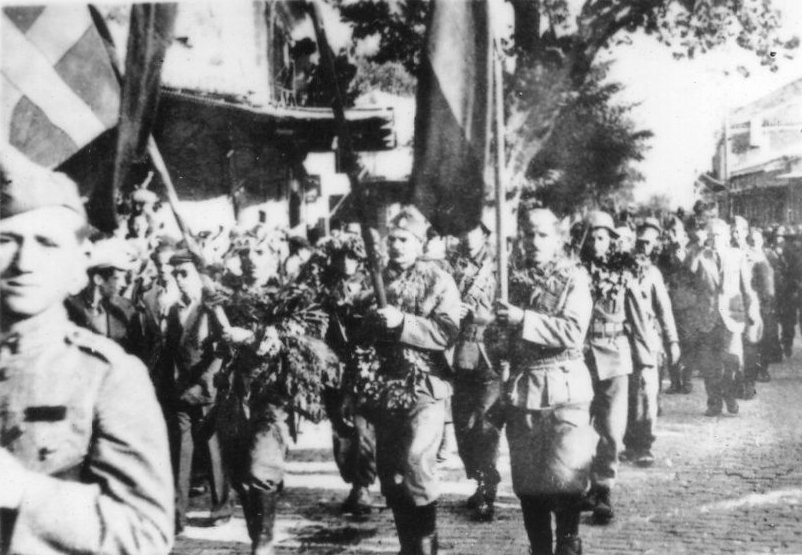
ELAS units enter Xanthi, 1944

After the German armed forces moved out of the country in October 1944, the unity government arrived in Greece and assumed political power, while the military command of Athens was assumed, per the agreements, by a British officer, Lieutenant-general Ronald Scobie. The British general immediately began issuing orders for all armed, non-National Army units to disband and surrender their weaponry. The subsequent unrest culminated in the Dekemvriana uprising, which began when Greek policemen and members of the paramilitary, anticommunist X fired on an unarmed, very large demonstration of EAM & KKE supporters in Syntagma Square, on 3 December, a demonstration that had been forbidden by the British military command. Widespread fighting erupted after ELAS units, in retaliation to the deadly shootings, attacked and occupied almost all police stations in Athens and attempted to control the whole of the capital city. British forces were quickly involved, decisively, in the fighting, and the EAM/ELAS attempt was eventually unsuccessful. An armistice was agreed in mid-January 1945.

Hatzis disagreed with KKE's readiness to respond militarily to the "provocation" of the 3rd of December, arguing that the people were not ready to follow the "forces of progress" into a civil war. Hatzis was arrested by state authorities following the uprising and sent to internal exile.

== Drift to civil war ==
In 1946, a critical point in the events following the December 1944 uprising was reached when a general election was proclaimed for the 31st of March. In mid-February 1946, an official delegation from ΕΑΜ, led by its Secretary Dimitrios Partsalidis, traveled to Moscow to discuss with the Soviet leadership the situation in Greece. Partsalidis submitted a report on the overall situation in Greece, the change in the character of the "progressive" forces' struggle from one of "national liberation" to a "national-democratic" struggle, and about preparing "in a military way" to go "over to [a] vigorous offensive." (Note: The Greek delegation sought an audience with Stalin or, at least, Molotov, but that did not happen. They conferred with a group led by L. Baranov, Deputy Chief of the Foreign Affairs Department of the CPSU Central Committee. See Ulunian (2002).) According to all available sources, the EAM delegation received, in response, a message from the Bolshevik Party's Central Committee firmly urging them to "take part in the [upcoming] elections," with the addendum to "later review the situation."

The Communist Party's Central Committee met in February and, there, its Secretary General Nicos Zachariadis proposed "in a very categorical manner" that KKE should abstain from the coming elections in protest against the "white terror" ostensibly undertaken by anti-communist paramilitaries with the assistance of the government. Hatzis objected strongly to the Secretary's proposal, arguing that an abstention would not reflect the "realities of the situation" and that the election, on the contrary, offered the opportunity to have at least one hundred party delegates elected in parliament. Most analysts as well as most participants in the events at the time, from the part of the left, subsequently consider the party's decision to abstain and boycott the elections as erroneous. By June 1946, the Greek government was able to have a Special Law approved without objections, by a parliament without representatives from the Communist Party, which punished with the death penalty anyone who was found guilty of taking up arms to have part of the national territory secede. (Note: A reference to the perceived threat of the Communist Party giving up the territory of Macedonia to Slavophone insurrectionists, in case DAG were to prevail in the civil war. See Voglis (2000))

== Civil war combatant and exile ==
Hatzis escaped from exile and joined the KKE-led Democratic Army in the civil war that'd began in 1947. By the end of that year, the Communist Party and EAM were outlawed. In 1948, Hatzis expressed his disagreement with the military-political line of the party's General Secretary Zachariadis and he was expelled from KKE. Hatzis followed the remnants of the defeated Democratic Army to the North, taking refuge in Yugoslavia and eventually in Tashkent, working as a dentist. He never participated again in the Communist Party's workings, and, during the events that led to the major split of 1968, he did not take sides.

In exile, Hatzis wrote a book on the historical events of the Occupation and liberation period that was published in four volumes in the 1980s, titled The Victorious Revolution that was Lost.

== Return to Greece ==
After the electoral victory of Andreas Papandreou in 1981, and the proclamation of general amnesty for all civil war combatants, Hatzis was able, along with thousands of still living veterans, to return to Greece.

He died after a long illness on 16 November 1982, less than a year after the new government passed legislation recognizing and honoring the resistance record of EAM and ELAS. The funeral procession, followed by thousands of people, delivered Hatzis' body to the First Cemetery of Athens burial ground assigned honoris by the city's mayoral authority.
