= Hatzimichalis =

Hatzimichalis or Chatzimichalis (Greek: Χατζημιχάλης) is a Greek name. Notable people with the name include:

- Hatzimichalis Dalianis (1775–1828), military leader during the Greek War of Independence
- Christos Hatzimichalis (1866–19??), Greek general

== See also ==
- Hatzi
