= Hadžići (disambiguation) =

Hadžići is a town and municipality in Sarajevo Canton of the Federation of Bosnia and Herzegovina

It may also refer to:

- Hadžići, Novi Travnik, a village in Novi Travnik municipality
- Hadžići, Visoko, a village in Visoko municipality
- Hadžići (Ilijaš), a village in Ilijaš municipality
- Hadžići (Goražde), a village in Goražde municipality
- Hadžići (Ključ), a village in Ključ municipality
