= Jahida Wahba =

Lebanese singer (born 1969)

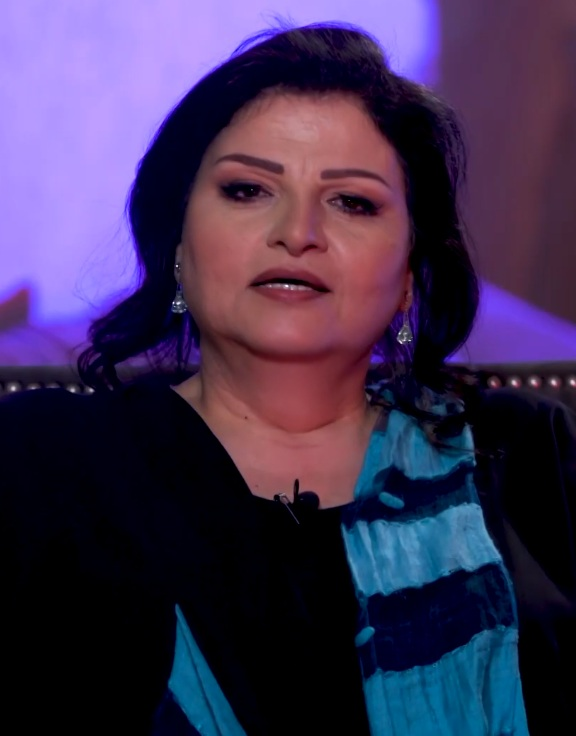
Jahida Wehbe, Jun 1, 2019

Jahida Wehbe (born 1969) is a Lebanese singer, musician, and theater artist. She developed her skills at the Lebanese University and the Lebanese National Higher Conservatory of Music, where she learned playing the oud and vocal techniques, particularly focusing on oriental singing and Sufi oud. Wehbe has composed musical and poetic pieces for stage performances and has set the words of various Arab and international poets to music.

== Artistic activities ==
Wehbe serves as the Head of the Culture and Programs Committee at the Lebanese Council of Authors and Composers. She is also a member of the Lebanese Syndicate of Professional Musicians and the French SACEM Association. Throughout her career, Wehbe has adapted the works of poets such as Ibn Arabi, Rabi'aa Al'adawiya, Jalal Eddine El Roumy, Mahmoud Darwish, Ounsi El Hajj, Talal Haidar, Kahlil Gibran, Badr Shaker Assayyab, Nazik Al Mala'ika, Goethe, and Günter Grass into musical compositions. Her 2007 debut album, Katabtany, which included lyrics by Günter Grass, was well-received in the Middle East.

She has published "The Blue and the Hoopoe: Love on Facebook" with Dar Al Saqi. She obtained a Master's degree in Acting and Directing in 2003 from the Faculty of Fine Arts, Lebanese University. She has done performances in her own country and abroad. She has also achieved awards home and internationally.

In 2002, she obtained a Bachelor's degree in Psychology from the Lebanese University. Since 2002 she has held the positions of freelance poet, singer, composer, and actress (theatre, television, and films). She has experience in singing, acting, poetry reading, music composition, and directing. She is fluent in three languages: Arabic, English, and French. Wehbe is also a member of the Syndicate of Professional Musicians in Lebanon, and a member of the Association of Writers, Authors, and Music Publishers in Lebanon.

In 2019 she performed in Rennes, France with Egyptian conductor, Nader Abbassi. This was done with the British Symphony Orchestra and a 150-member choir. In 2021, Wahba performed in deSingel in Antwerp, Belgium, together with the Syrian violinist Shalan Alhamwy and his ensemble Picea Orientalis.
