= Harj (given name) =

Harj is a given name. Notable people with the name include:

- Harj Dhaliwal, Canadian politician
- Harj Taggar, entrepreneur

== See also ==
- Hajji (name)
- Hadj (name)
