= Moustakopoulos =

Greek sports shooter

Moustakopoulos (Greek: Μουστακόπουλος) was a Greek shooter. He competed at the 1896 Summer Olympics in Athens. Moustakopoulos competed in the free rifle event. His place and score in the event are not known, though he did not finish in the top five.
