= Hadj (name) =

Hadj is both a given name and a surname. Notable people with the name include:

== Given name ==
- Hadj Abderrahmane (1941-1981), Algerian actor
- Hadj Belkheir (born 1977), Algerian boxer
- Hadj Bouchiba (1903-1957), Algerian songwriter
- Hadj Boudella (born 1965), Algerian man
- Hadj Bouguèche (born 1983), Algerian footballer
- Hadj Menouar (1913-1951), Algerian singer
- Hadj M'rizek (1912-1955), Algerian songwriter
- Hadj Sadok Bouziane (born 1987), Algerian footballer
- Hadj Smaine Mohamed Seghir (1932–2021), Algerian actor

== Surname ==
- Messali Hadj (1898-1974), Algerian politician

== Other ==
- Amir Hadj Massaoued (born 1982), Tunisian footballer
- Ezzeddine Hadj Sassi (born 1962), Tunisian footballer
- Lazhar Hadj Aïssa (born 1984), Algerian footballer
- Othmane Hadj Lazib (born 1983), Algerian hurdler
- Said Hadj Mansour, Palestinian footballer
- Rashi Ali Hadj Matumla (born 1968), Tanzanian boxer
- Samir Si Hadj Mohand (born 1982), Algerian footballer
- Tarek Hadj Adlane (born 1965), Algerian footballer

== See also ==
- Harj (given name)
- Hadj Mechri, town
- Ali Benhadj (born 1956), Algerian man
