= Hatzi =

Hatzi- or Chatzi- (Greek: Χατζη-) is a prefix of Greek family names. It derives from the Turkish word 'Hacı' which ultimately derives from the Arabic Hajji, a name for someone who has successfully completed a pilgrimage.

In Orthodox Christianity, the prefix is added when someone had committed the pilgrimage to Jerusalem. For example, if the name was Giannis, the name would then be Hatzigiannis after the journey.

In Islam, the prefix is added before the name. For example, Ibrahim Kaya would become Hajji Ibrahim Kaya.

== See also ==
- Hatzis
- Hadžić
- Hatzianestis
- Hatzidakis
- Hatzimichalis
- Chatzigeorgiou
