= Hatzis =

Hatzis or Chatzis (Greek: Χατζής) is a Greek surname with the female version being Hatzi or Chatzi (Χατζή). The name is derived from the honorific prefix Hatzi- designating people who have visited the Holy Land. Notable people with the surname include:

- Dimitrios Hatzis (1913–1981), novelist and journalist.
- Guido Hatzis, Greek-Australian comic character
- Michalis Chatzis (born 1978), Greek footballer
- Nikos Chatzis (born 1976), Greek basketball player
- Thanasis Hatzis (1905–1982), Greek resistance fighter of EAM
- Tony Hatzis (born 1986), Australian footballer
- Vassileios Chatzis (1870–1915), Greek painter best known for his seascapes
