= Khadzhiev =

Khadzhiev or Khadzhiyev is a surname. Notable people with the surname include:

- Mitko Khadzhiev (born 1961), Bulgarian alpine skier
- Ramzan Khadzhiev (1955–1996), Russian journalist
- Salambek Khadzhiyev (1941–2018), Russian-Chechen petrochemist and politician
- Sapardurdy Khadzhiev (fl. 2006 – c. 2013), Turkmen human rights activist

== See also ==
- Hadzhiev
