= Hanin Sayyed =

Lebanese economsit and academic

- حنين السيد
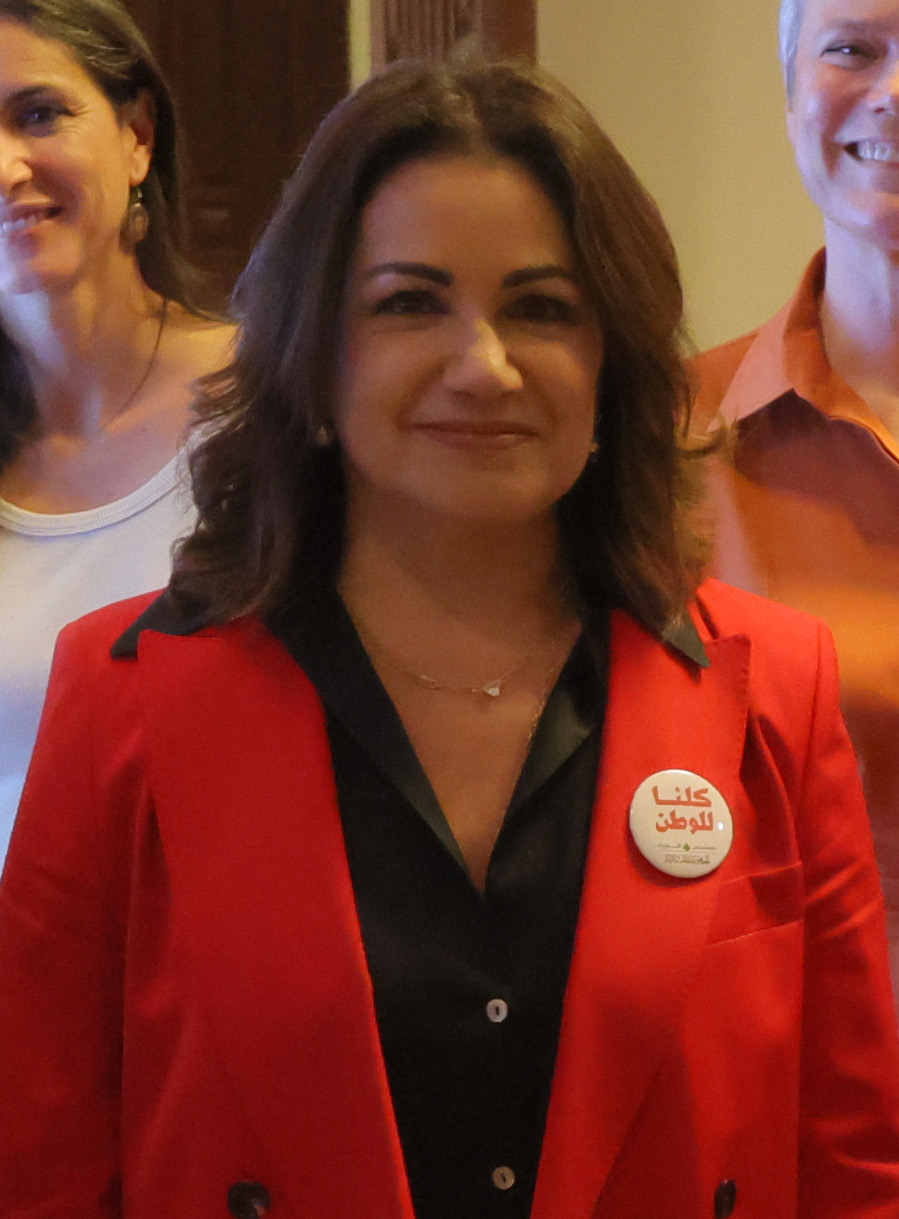
- Sayyed in 2026

Minister of Social Affairs
- Incumbent
- Assumed office 8 February 2025
- President: Joseph Aoun
- Prime Minister: Nawaf Salam
- Preceded by: Hector Hajjar

Personal details
- Party: Independent
- Education: Stanford University; Columbia University

Hanin Sayyed (Arabic: حنين السيد, romanized: Ḥunayn al-Sayyid) is a Lebanese economist and academic. She has been serving as Minister of Social Affairs of Lebanon since 2025 and previously served at the World Bank.

== Career ==
Sayyed is an economist by training, holding a bachelor's and postgraduate degrees from Stanford University and Columbia University in the United States.

She has taught at several universities in New York and has worked at Morgan Stanley, the Kuwait Institute for Scientific Research, and the Arab Fund for Economic and Social Development. In addition, she has a long career at the World Bank, where she served as a senior expert in human development and social protection at the Bank’s Beirut office for the Middle East and North Africa region, and where, between 2011 and 2017, she coordinated the response to the Syrian civil war and its consequences.

She has also been involved during the Lebanese financial crisis, where she led the social response through programs such as the Emergency Social Safety Net.

Sayyed was named the new Minister of Social Affairs of Lebanon by new Prime Minister Nawaf Salam, succeeding Hector Hajjar on 8 February 2025.

== Personal life ==
Her mother died at the 2020 Beirut explosion.
