= Hector Hajjar =

Lebanese politician and dentist

- هيكتور حجار
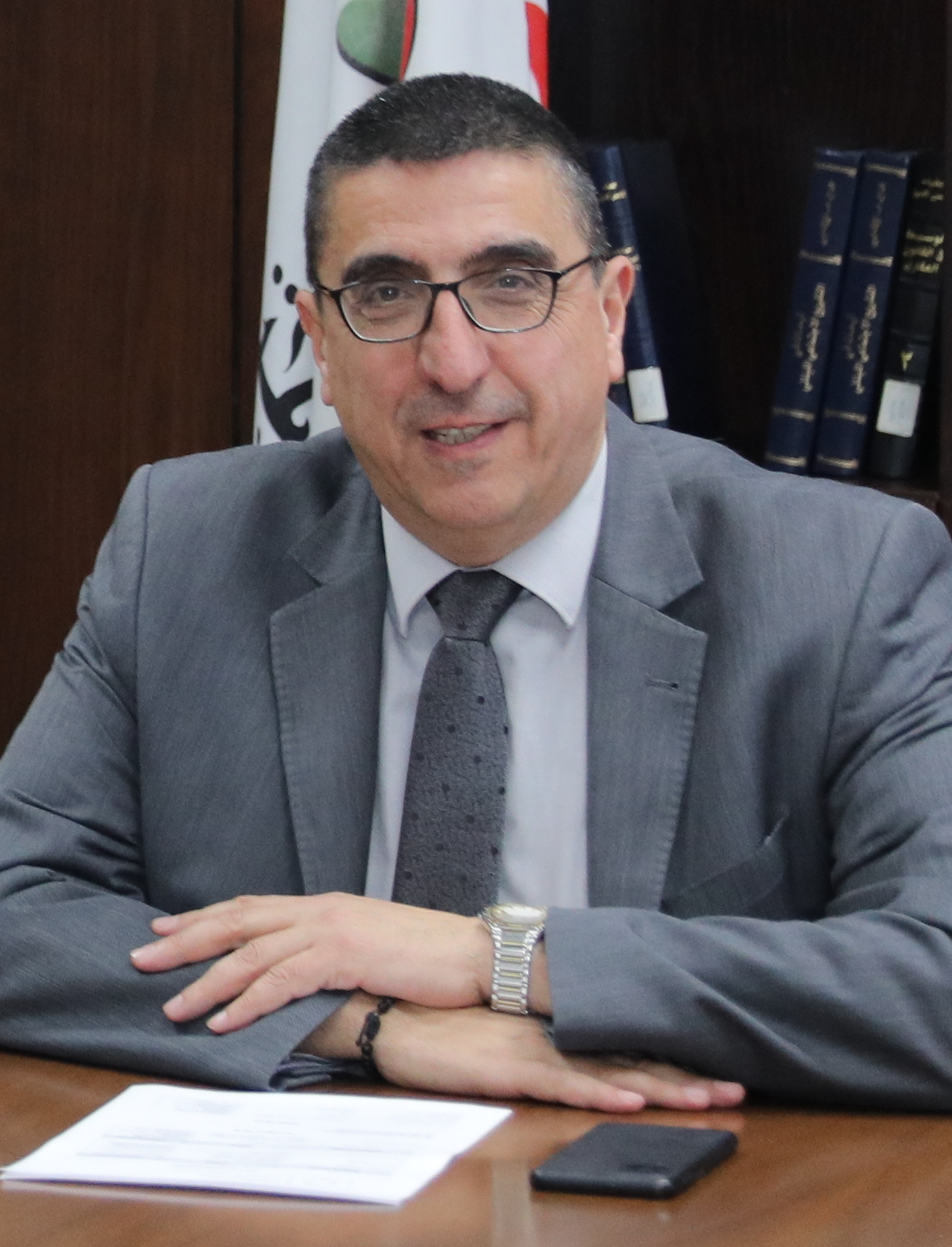
- Hajjar in 2023

Minister of Social Affairs
- In office 10 September 2021 – 8 February 2025
- Appointed by: Najib Mikati
- President: Michel Aoun; Joseph Aoun
- Prime Minister: Najib Mikati
- Preceded by: Ramzi Mcharrafieh
- Succeeded by: Hanin Sayyed

Personal details
- Born: 1965 (age 60–61) Qaitouli, Jezzine District, Lebanon
- Children: 2
- Education: Lebanese University; Saint Joseph University of Beirut
- Occupation: Politician, dentist, social activist
- Cabinet: Third Najib Mikati cabinet

Hector Hajjar (Arabic: هيكتور حجار; born 1965) is a Lebanese dentist, social activist and politician. The founder of Message de Paix, a charity for adults with intellectual disabilities, he served as Minister of Social Affairs in the Third Najib Mikati cabinet from 10 September 2021 to 8 February 2025, in a caretaker capacity from May 2022.

== Early life and education ==
Hajjar was born in 1965 to a Catholic family in Qaitouli (Kaitouly), Jezzine District. He earned a doctorate in dental surgery from the Lebanese University in 1991, along with a university diploma in oral medicine and a master's degree in maxillofacial radiology. In 1998 he received a licence in social animation from the Lebanese School of Social Training (ELFS) at Saint Joseph University, where he later sat on the school's strategic orientation council.

== Social work ==
Hajjar practised as a dental surgeon before devoting himself full-time to social work. He has said that his social engagement began in the 1980s, with his first activities in Bourj Hammoud. He worked with Caritas Lebanon.

He is president and CEO of Message de Paix (Risalat Salam), founded in 1997 to support adults with intellectual disabilities through housing, vocational workshops and educational, medical and psychosocial programmes. The association runs residential centres in Bikfaya (opened 2008) and Maad, Byblos District (opened 2020). He also co-founded the Community of the Missionary Brothers, Christian Entrepreneurs and Business Leaders – Lebanon, and the association Prévention, Accompagnement et Développement (PAD).

According to Hajjar, he spent two years on reconstruction work in Bint Jbeil and Yaroun after the 2006 Lebanon War, and in 2020 opened a free COVID-19 quarantine centre in Maad in cooperation with the army and the health ministry.

== Minister of Social Affairs ==
=== Appointment ===
On 10 September 2021, a new government headed by Najib Mikati was formed, 13 months after the resignation of Hassan Diab. Hajjar was appointed Minister of Social Affairs, reportedly as a choice of President Michel Aoun. He is considered close to the Free Patriotic Movement, though he has stated that he has no party affiliation. Shortly after his appointment, a radio interview from about a year earlier, in which he had advised Lebanese families to give up disposable nappies to cope with the crisis, drew criticism.

Hajjar took over a ministry weakened by the economic crisis; he later said its budget had fallen by 80% in a decade and that staff salaries had not been adjusted since 2019.

=== Social protection ===
On 1 December 2021, registration opened for the AMAN emergency cash-transfer programme, funded by a US$246 million World Bank loan, alongside a ration-card scheme that had no secured funding; Hajjar described the aid as "temporary relief". More than 580,000 households registered; the programme targeted 150,000 families, with payments starting in March 2022 alongside the WFP-supported National Poverty Targeting Programme (NPTP). In May 2023 the World Bank approved an additional US$300 million to expand AMAN to 160,000 households with payments in dollars. In January 2024 Hajjar announced that these funds had been suspended after the World Bank objected to an amendment added by parliament to the loan law, while donors sharply cut NPTP funding. By October 2024, 166,700 families were receiving payments under AMAN and the NPTP.

In February 2024 the government launched Lebanon's first National Social Protection Strategy, developed with UNICEF and the ILO. The ministry also set up the 1714 hotline.

=== Disability ===
In April 2023, with UNICEF and the ILO and with European Union funding, Hajjar launched a National Disability Allowance of US$40 a month for more than 20,000 holders of the official disability card. In December 2024 he announced exceptional payments to about 18,000 people with disabilities under 30 and a plan to renew disability cards.

=== Syrian refugees ===
Hajjar took a hard line on the presence of Syrian refugees in Lebanon. At the Brussels VI conference in May 2022, he asked for US$30 billion in compensation for hosting them. In June 2022 he announced a return plan while stating his commitment to non-refoulement. The file was assigned to his ministry in August 2022, and the first organised return convoys left in late October 2022. He repeatedly clashed with the UNHCR, calling on it to coordinate with the government.

In May 2023 he called UNHCR's plan to pay refugee aid in US dollars a "crime" against Lebanon; the UN suspended the scheme at the government's request. In October 2023 he refused to open schools and state institutions to Syrians fleeing clashes on the southern border, a stance that rights groups condemned as discriminatory. In April 2024 he proposed a census to distinguish displaced Syrians from other residents, who could then be repatriated.

=== 2024 war and fall of Assad ===
During the Israeli offensive in autumn 2024, the ministry paid emergency aid to beneficiary families and people with disabilities, and in October 2024 Hajjar pledged to protect all displaced people, including Syrians, Palestinians and migrant workers. After the fall of the Assad regime in December 2024, he visited Hermel to assess the arrival of more than 85,000 people from Syria, around 20,000 of them Lebanese.

=== Cabinet politics ===
In December 2022, during the presidential vacancy, Hajjar co-signed a statement with eight other ministers opposing caretaker cabinet sessions as unconstitutional, but still attended the session of 5 December 2022, which dealt with medicines for cancer patients.

His term ended with the formation of the Nawaf Salam cabinet on 8 February 2025; he handed over the ministry to Hanin Sayyed on 13 February 2025.

== After office ==
Hajjar has continued to comment publicly on Lebanon's financial and social crisis. He was mentioned as a possible Free Patriotic Movement candidate for the Catholic seat of Jezzine in the 2026 parliamentary election, before parliament postponed the vote by two years in March 2026.

During the 2026 war, he toured shelters for displaced people in the Jezzine area with Free Patriotic Movement officials, and has said he narrowly escaped several strikes while travelling in the south and in Beirut. In July 2026 he met the secretary general of the Middle East Council of Churches to discuss support for people with disabilities and cooperation with Message de Paix.

== Personal life ==
Hajjar is a Catholic. He is married and has two children.
