= Antelothanasis =

Greek sports shooter

Antelothanasis (Greek: Αντελοθανάσης) was a Greek shooter. He competed at the 1896 Summer Olympics in Athens. Antelothanasis competed in the free rifle event. His place and score in the event are not known, though he did not finish in the top five.
