= Leon Langakis =

Greek sport shooter

Leon Langakis (Greek: Λέων Λαγγάκης) was a Greek shooter. Langakis participated in the 1896 Summer Olympics in Athens, competing in the free rifle event. He did not finish the competition.
