= Shooting at the 1896 Summer Olympics – Men's 300 metre free rifle =

Olympic shooting event

Men's 300 metre free rifle at the Games of the I Olympiad
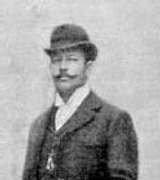
- Georgios Orphanidis (1897)
- Venue: Kallithea shooting range
- Dates: April 11–12, 1896
- Competitors: 20 from 3 nations
- Winning score: 1583

Medalists
1st place, gold medalist(s)		Georgios Orphanidis; Greece
2nd place, silver medalist(s)		Ioannis Frangoudis; Greece
3rd place, bronze medalist(s)		Viggo Jensen; Denmark

The men's 300 metre free rifle was one of the five sport shooting events on the Shooting at the 1896 Summer Olympics programme. The second rifle event and last of the shooting events, the free rifle was begun on 11 April. Each marksman fired 40 shots, in four strings of ten. 25 men entered the event, though only 20 actually competed. They represented three nations. Frangoudis led after the first day, but when the event was continued on 12 April, Orphanidis took the lead and held on to win first place. He hit the target 37 times.

== Background ==
This was the only appearance of the men's 300 metre free rifle event without position requirements. A three-positions event would be introduced in 1900 (along with team and individual position medals) and held 11 times between then and 1972.

== Competition format ==
The competition had each shooter fire 40 shots, in 4 strings of 10, at a range of 300 metres. Scoring involved multiplying target hits by points scored in each string.

== Schedule ==
The free rifle was the last of the shooting events, starting in the afternoon of day 6 of competition. It went until it was too dark to shoot, then was postponed until the next morning. It finished at 1 p.m. on Sunday. Precise start times for each session are not known.

Date		Time	Round
Gregorian	Julian	Time	Round
Saturday, 11 April 1896; Sunday, 12 April 1896	Saturday, 30 March 1896; Sunday, 31 March 1896		Final

== Results ==
Rank	Shooter	Nation	Score	Hits	1	2	3	4
1st place, gold medalist(s)	Georgios Orphanidis	Greece	1,583	37	328	520	420	315
2nd place, silver medalist(s)	Ioannis Frangoudis	Greece	1,312	31	470	192	440	210
3rd place, bronze medalist(s)	Viggo Jensen	Denmark	1,305	31	392	423	280	210
4	Anastasios Metaxas	Greece	1,102	Unknown				
5	Pantelis Karasevdas	Greece	1,039	Unknown				
6–18	Antelothanasis	Greece	Unknown					
6–18	Georgios Diamantis	Greece	Unknown'					
6–18	Alexios Fetsios	Greece	Unknown					
6–18	Karakatsanis	Greece	Unknown					
6–18	Hatzidakis	Greece	Unknown					
6–18	Nikolaos Levidis	Greece	Unknown					
6–18	Sidney Merlin	Great Britain	Unknown					
6–18	Xenon Mikhailidis	Greece	Unknown					
6–18	Moustakopoulos	Greece	Unknown					
6–18	Panagiotis Pavlidis	Greece	Unknown					
6–18	Alexandros Theofilakis	Greece	Unknown					
6–18	Ioannis Theofilakis	Greece	Unknown					
6–18	Nikolaos Trikoupis	Greece	Unknown					
—	Leonidas Langakis	Greece	DNF					
—	Ioannis Vourakis	Greece	DNF					
