= Chatzigeorgiou =

Chatzigeorgiou, Hatzigeorgiou, or Hadjigeorgiou (Greek: Χατζηγεωργίου) is a Greek surname.

- Menelaos Chatzigeorgiou (1924–2020), Greek sportsman and politician
- Takis Hadjigeorgiou (born 1956), Cypriot politician
- Michel Hatzigeorgiou (born 1961), Belgian musician

== Given name ==
Chatzigeorgios, Hatzigeorgios, or Hadjigeorgios can also be a Greek given name. People with the name include:

- Hadji-Georgis the Athonite (1809–1886), Cappadocian Greek monk

== See also ==
- Hatzi
