= Haj (disambiguation) =

The haj, more commonly spelled hajj, is an annual Islamic pilgrimage to Mecca.

Haj or HAJ may also refer to:

== Places ==
- Háj (Fichtel Mountains), a mountain in the Czech Republic
- Háj (observation tower), an observation tower near Šumperk in the Czech Republic
- Háj, Košice-okolie District, a municipality and village in Slovakia
- Háj, Turčianske Teplice District, a municipality and village in Slovakia
- Hāj, other name of Hajj Qeshlaq, a village in Iran

== People ==
- Haj Ross (born 1938), American linguist
- Joseph Haj, American artistic director

== Other uses ==
- The Haj (novel), a novel by Leon Uris
- Hajong language, spoken in India and Bangladesh
- HAJ, IATA code for Hannover Airport, in Germany

== See also ==
- Hajj (disambiguation)
