= Ioannis Vourakis =

Greek sport shooter

Ioannis Vourakis (Greek: Ιωάννης Βουράκης) was a Greek shooter. He competed at the 1896 Summer Olympics in Athens. Vourakis competed in the free rifle event. However, he did not finish the competition.
