= Hadžići, Novi Travnik =

Hadžići
- Village
- Location within Bosnia and Herzegovina
- Coordinates: 44.1601°N 17.6087°E
- Country: Bosnia and Herzegovina
- Entity: Federation of Bosnia and Herzegovina
- Canton: Central Bosnia
- Municipality: Novi Travnik

Area
  - Total: 0.31 sq mi (0.80 km^{2})

Population (2013)
  - Total: 158
  - Density: 510/sq mi (200/km^{2})
- Time zone: UTC+1 (CET)
  - Summer (DST): UTC+2 (CEST)

Hadžići is a village in the municipality of Novi Travnik, Bosnia and Herzegovina.

== Demographics ==
According to the 2013 census, its population was 158.

Ethnicity in 2013
Ethnicity	Number	Percentage
Croats	122	77.2%
Bosniaks	36	22.8%
Total	158	100%
