= Japanese destroyer Hagi =

Two ships of the Japanese Navy have been named Hagi:

- Japanese destroyer Hagi (1920), a Momi-class destroyer launched in 1920. She was renamed Patrol Boat No.33 in 1940 and lost in 1941.
- Japanese destroyer Hagi (1944), a Tachibana-class destroyer launched in 1944 and scrapped in 1947.
