= Christos Hatzimichalis =

Major General Christos Hatzimichalis
- Born: 1866; Athens, Kingdom of Greece
- Died: Unknown
- Education: Hellenic Military Academy
- Military career
- Allegiance: Kingdom of Greece
- Branch: Hellenic Army
- Service years: 1889–1920; 1922–1923
- Rank: Major General
- Commands: Commander of the Hellenic Military Academy; 9th Infantry Division; Head of Army Staff Service; II Army Corps
- Wars: Greco-Turkish War of 1897; Balkan Wars; First Balkan War; Second Balkan War; World War I; Macedonian Front

Christos Hatzimichalis (Greek: Χρήστος Χατζημιχάλης) was a Greek Engineers officer who rose to the rank of major general.

He was born in Athens in 1866. He was the great-grandson of the Greek War of Independence commander Hatzimichalis Dalianis. After studies at the Hellenic Army Academy, he was commissioned as an Engineers 2nd lieutenant in 1889. He fought in the Greco-Turkish War of 1897 on the Epirus front, served as a captain in the General Staff during the First Balkan War of 1912–13, and, promoted to major, fought with the 1st Infantry Division during the Second Balkan War soon after.

By 1916 he was a lieutenant colonel, and supported the uprising in Thessaloniki that led to the establishment of a separate Provisional Government of National Defence under Eleftherios Venizelos there, and was charged with organizing the Engineer Corps of the "Army of National Defence" the latter raised. In 1917–1920 he served successively as commander of the Army Academy, of the 9th Infantry Division, and as head of the Army Staff Service. He resigned from the army after the Venizelist electoral defeat in November 1920.

He was recalled to active service by the revolutionary government after the September 1922 Revolution, and commanded the II Army Corps until the signing of the Treaty of Lausanne, when he returned to retirement.

He was considered an officer of great erudition, and had published various studies on military affairs, including one on the 1897 war with Turkey.
