= Ezzeddine Hadj Sassi =

Tunisian footballer

Ezzeddine Hadj Sassi (born 17 December 1962) is a Tunisian retired footballer who played as a forward.

== Career ==
Sassi played for Océano Club de Kerkennah, playing his first game for their senior team on 11 October 1981. He was the best player on his team at the beginning of the 1980s, placing eighth on the table of the best players of the Tunisian Ligue Professionnelle 1, the top division of Tunisian football, in 1985–86. He was the fourth-highest goalscorer that year, with seven goals.

He was the third-highest goalscorer in the Tunisian Ligue Professionnelle 1 in 1986–87, having scored 11 goals. In 1987–88 he was the best goalscorer of the League II, with 13 goals.

He played one game for Tunisia national team. His career ended at the end of the 1993–94 season.

== Honours ==
Tunisian Ligue Professionnelle 2

- Winner: 1990–1991
- Winner of South Pole: 1984–1985
