= Ishtiyaque Haji =

American philosopher

Education
- Education: University of Massachusetts, Amherst (PhD)

Philosophical work
- Era: 21st-century philosophy
- Region: Western philosophy
- Institutions: University of Calgary, University of Minnesota, Morris
- Main interests: free will, ethical theory, philosophical psychology, moral responsibility

Ishtiyaque Haji is an American philosopher and Professor Emeritus at the University of Calgary. He is known for his works on free will and philosophy of action.

== Books ==
- Obligation and Responsibility, Oxford University Press, 2023
- Luck's Mischief: Obligation and Blameworthiness on a Thread, Oxford University Press, 2016
- Reason's Debt to Freedom: Normative Appraisals, Reasons, and Free Will, Oxford University Press, 2012
- Incompatibilism's Allure: Principal Arguments for Incompatibilism, Broadview Press, 2009
- Deontic Morality and Control, Cambridge University Press, 2002
- Moral Appraisability, Oxford University Press, 1988
