= Hadzhiev =

Hadzhiev or Hadjiev or Khadjiev (Bulgarian: Хаджиев) is a Bulgarian surname derived from hajji, which originally was an honorific title given to a Muslim person who has successfully completed the Hajj to Mecca, but which was later adopted by Christian peoples as a word for pilgrim.

== People ==
- Kamen Hadzhiev (born 1991), Bulgarian footballer.
- Todor Hadzhiev (1881–1956), Bulgarian conductor, composer, and pianist.

- Parashkev Hadzhiev (1919–1992), Bulgarian composer, son of Todor.

- Zelimkhan Khadjiev (born 1994), French freestyle wrestler of Chechen heritage.

== Places ==
- Hadzhievo, Bulgaria
- Hadzhievtsi, North Macedonia

== See also ==
- Khadzhiev
