= Dimitrios Partsalidis =

Greek politician

Dimitrios "Mitsos" Partsalidis (Greek: Δημήτρης "Μήτσος" Παρτσαλίδης; 1905–1980) was a Greek communist politician.

== Biography ==
Partsalidis was a Pontic Greek born in Trabzon in the Trebizond Vilayet of the Ottoman Empire. During the population exchange between Greece and Turkey, Partsalidis was expelled to Greece, as were all members of the Greek Orthodox Church.

Partsaldis soon joined the Communist Party of Greece and became involved in politics. In 1934, with the backing of the tobacco cultivators, he was elected mayor of Kavala, being the first member of the Communist Party to be elected mayor of any Greek city. There followed a wave of electoral wins in Communist strongholds and those elected were nicknamed the Red Mayors.

During the Greek Civil War, on April 3, 1949, Partsalidis became head of the Provisional Democratic Government formed by the Communists in areas under their effective control, succeeding Markos Vafeiadis. He was the final head of the Provisional Government, and remained in office until October 1950 (in exile after August 28, 1949). At the Battle of Grammos-Vitsi the communist Democratic Army of Greece (DSE) was defeated and he was forced into exile to Soviet Union.

In October 1971, Partsalidis was arrested by the Greek military junta of 1967–1974 along with Charalambos Drakopoulos (el), the General Secretary of the KKE Interior party. He published his memoirs in 1978. Partsalidis died in Athens on June 22, 1980.

== Attribution ==
- This article contains text from the article Dimitrios Partsalidis at Phantis, a GFDL wiki.

Preceded by Markos Vafeiadis	Head of the Provisional Democratic Government; 3 April 1949 - October 1950	Communist defeat in the Greek Civil War
