= Hatzidakis (athlete) =

Greek sports shooter

Hatzidakis (Greek: Χατζιδάκις), first name unknown, was a Greek shooter. He competed at the 1896 Summer Olympics in Athens. Hatzidakis competed in the free rifle event. His place and score in the event are unknown, though he did not finish in the top five.
