= Hadji =

Hadji is a variant spelling of Hajji, a title and prefix that is awarded to a person who has successfully completed the Hajj (pilgrimage) to Mecca. It may also refer to:

== People ==
=== Given name ===
- El Hadji Ba (born 1993), French-born footballer
- El Hadji Diouf (born 1981), Senegalese footballer
- El Hadji Guissé, Senegalese judge
- El Hadji Ndiaye (born 1986), Senegalese professional basketball player
- Hadji Ali (c. 1887–92–1937), vaudeville performance artist
- Hadji Ali Haseki, 18th-century Ottoman Turk despot who ruled Athens in Greece for some time
- Hadji Barry (born 1992), Guinean professional footballer
- Hadji Butu (1865–1937), Filipino politician
- Hadji Kamlon, ethnic Tausūg man who fought in World War II, and later staged an uprising against the Philippine government
- Hadji Mponda (born 1958), Tanzanian politician
- Hadji Mustafa Pasha (1733—1801), Ottoman commander and politician
- Hadji Murad (c. 1790–1852), Caucasian leader

=== Surname ===
- Mustapha Hadji (born 1971), Moroccan international footballer
- Youssouf Hadji (born 1980), Moroccan international footballer (and Mustapha's younger brother)
- Samir Hadji (born 1989), French footballer

== Other uses ==
- Hadji (character), a fictional character, an Indian protagonist in the American television series Jonny Quest
- "Hadji Girl", a 2006 song by Corporal Joshua Belile of the United States Marine Corps

== See also ==
- Hadji Murat (novella), a novella by Tolstoy whose protagonist is Hadji Murat
- Hadji Mohammad Ajul, a municipality in the Philippines
- Hadji Muhammed, an archaeological site in Southern Iraq
- Hadji Muhtamad, a municipality in the Philippines
- Hadji Panglima Tahil, a municipality in the Philippines
- Mustafa Haji Abdinur, Somali journalist and radio correspondent
- Stelios Haji-Ioannou (born 1967), Cypriot entrepreneur
- Hajji (disambiguation)
