= Hadžići, Visoko =

Hadžići
- Village
- Location within Bosnia and Herzegovina
- Coordinates: 44.0380627°N 18.0637387°E
- Country: Bosnia and Herzegovina
- Entity: Federation of Bosnia and Herzegovina
- Canton: Zenica-Doboj
- Municipality: Visoko

Area
  - Total: 0.87 sq mi (2.26 km^{2})

Population (2013)
  - Total: 142
  - Density: 163/sq mi (62.8/km^{2})
- Time zone: UTC+1 (CET)
  - Summer (DST): UTC+2 (CEST)

Hadžići is a village in the municipality of Visoko, Bosnia and Herzegovina.

== Demographics ==
According to the 2013 census, its population was 142.

Ethnicity in 2013
Ethnicity	Number	Percentage
Bosniaks	131	92.3%
Croats	1	0.7%
other/undeclared	10	7.0%
Total	142	100%
