= Hadžiosmanović =

Hadžiosmanović (Serbian Cyrillic: Хаџиосмановић, pronounced [xadʒiǒsmanoʋitɕ]) is a Bosniak and Montenegrin surname. Notable people with the surname include:

- Cristian Hadžiosmanović (born 1998), Italian-born Montenegrin footballer
- Derviš Hadžiosmanović (born 1959), Montenegrin football coach and former player
- Hatidža Hadžiosmanović (1938–2015), President of the Constitutional Court of Bosnia and Herzegovina
