= Elhadjy Madior N'Diaye =

Senegalese footballer

Elhadjy N'Diaye
Personal information
- Full name: Elhadjy Madior N'Diaye
- Date of birth: 20 May 1983 (age 43)
- Place of birth: Saint-Louis, Senegal
- Height: 1.82 m (6 ft 0 in)
- Position: Right back

Senior career*
Years	Team	Apps	(Gls)
2004–2005	Douanes		
2005–2006	Vitória Setúbal B	2	(1)
2006–2007	Vitória Setúbal	8	(0)
2008–2009	Torreense	10	(0)
2009–2010	Famalicão	29	(0)
2011	Portimonense	0	(0)
2011–2012	Fão	25	(5)
2012–2013	Vilaverdense	27	(0)
2013	Mirandela	1	(0)
2013–2014	Ninense	24	(1)
2014–2015	Melgacense	8	(1)
2015–2016	Vianense	22	(4)
2016	Porto Lausanne		
2017–2018	Dardania Lausanne	12	(0)
Total		168	(12)
- * Club domestic league appearances and goals

Elhadjy Madior N'Diaye (born 20 May 1983) is a Senegalese former footballer who played mainly as a right back.

== Club career ==
Born in Saint-Louis, N'Diaye arrived in Portugal in 2005, signing with Vitória de Setúbal from AS Douanes. He appeared rarely for the Sado side during his two-year spell, inclusively being demoted to the reserves.

After one year without a club, N'Diaye resumed his career in the same country, representing S.C.U. Torreense (third division) and F.C. Famalicão (fourth tier). He then spent a few months with Portimonense S.C. without making one single official appearance, following which he joined amateurs C.F. Fão in Esposende.
