= Nada El Hage =

Lebanese poet, writer, and journalist

Nada El Hage (Arabic: ندى الحاج) is a Lebanese poet, writer, and journalist. Some of her poems have been translated and published in French, Spanish, Italian, English and German anthologies.

== Biography ==
She co-translated along with the Lebanese writer May Menassa the poetical works of the late Nadia Tueni, "Sentimental Archives of the Lebanese War".

In 2001, El Hage's poems were translated and published in the contemporary anthology “The poetry of Arab women”, edited by the researcher Nathalie Handal, and translated into Italian and published in a contemporary anthology edited by Valentina Colombo.

Her book Veils of passion was translated by Valentina Colombo and to Persian by Mohammad Hamadi. El Hage performed her poetry on various stages and through different cultural movements and festivals such as "Al Madina theater" Beirut 2000, Beirut international Arab book Fair 2001, Sheikh Ibrahim Center Bahrain 2007, UNESCO Palace Beirut 2008, Freikeh Festival Lebanon 2008, Lebanese American University 2009, Cairo Opera House 2009, Beit El Shier-Bahrain 2009, Daraj El Fan Beirut 2009, Navara-Italy 2013, Sharjah International Book Fair 2015 and in several cities of Morocco 2019 and 2022

== Selected works ==
=== Books of poetry ===
- Prayer in the Wind (1988)
- Fingers of the Soul (1994)
- Journey of the Shadow (1999)
- All This Love (2001)
- Forest of Light (2002)
- With the Lightness of a Falling Moon (2006)
- Veils of Passion (2010)
- "Under the blue rain" (2015)
- "Traversing Wonderment" (2020) Published by Almutawassit- Milano
- "Steps of Feathers"(2023)

Published by Almutawassit-Milano
