= Ilektra Apostolou =

Greek partisan

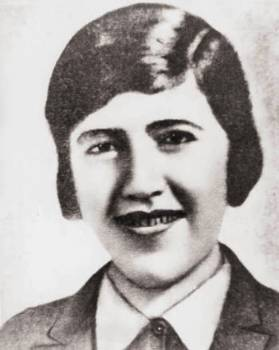
Ilektra Apostolou in 1944

Ilektra Apostolou (Greek: Ηλέκτρα Αποστόλου; 20 February 1912 – 26 July 1944) was a member of the Young Communist League of Greece, United Panhellenic Organization of Youth and the Communist Party of Greece, born in Athens. She participated in the Greek Resistance. She was also a proponent of woman's rights.

She was executed in Athens by the collaborationist State Special Security Directorate, which was a section of Hellenic Gendarmerie, because of her activity. Besides her action, she is known for the questioning she had with her interrogator: "Where are you from? I am from Greece. Where do you live? In Greece. What is your name? Greek. Who are your collaborators? They're all Greeks. What is your job? I work for the Greek people."

== Sources ==
- Βιογραφική Εγκυκλοπαίδεια του Νεωτέρου Ελληνισμού 1830-2010 - Αρχεία Ελληνικής Βιογραφίας, Εκδόσεις Μέτρον, 2011, τόμος Α΄, σελ. 122
- Ιστορία της Αντίστασης 1940-45, Εκδόσεις Αυλός, Αθήνα 1979
- Το τιμωρό χέρι του λαού. Η δράση του ΕΛΑΣ και της ΟΠΛΑ στην κατεχόμενη πρωτεύουσα 1942-1944, Ιάσονας Χανδρινός, Εκδόσεις Θεμέλιο, Αθήνα 2012
- Ακροναυπλία. Θρύλος και πραγματικότητα, Γιάννης Μανούσακας, Εκδόσεις Δωρικός, Αθήνα 1978
