= Ounsi el-Hajj =

Lebanese poet, journalist, and translator (1937–2014)

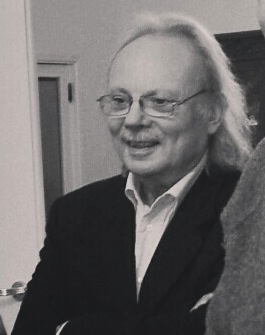
- Ounsi in Beirut, 2012
- Born: July 27, 1937; Jezzine, South Governorate, Lebanon
- Died: February 18, 2014 (aged 76)
- Occupations: Poet; Journalist; Translator

Ounsi el-Hajj (Arabic: أنسى الحاج; 1937–2014) was a Lebanese poet, journalist, and translator.

== Life and career ==
Ounsi completed his studies at Lycée Francais and La Sagesse High School. He began a professional career in journalism in 1956, as director of the cultural page at Al Hayat newspaper. He then moved to An Nahar newspaper where he was responsible for the editing of non-political content and expanded the daily cultural column into a daily full page spread. In 1964, he founded the poetry magazine Al-Mulhaq as a supplementary cultural publication to An Nahar which circulated weekly. In the first part of this period between 1964 and 1974, he worked in cooperation with Chawki Abi Shakra on Al Mulhaq. Besides his permanent position at An Nahar, Ounsi held the editor-in-chief position at several magazines including Al Hasnaa magazine in 1966 and Annahar al Arabi wal Duwali (Arab and International Nahar) between 1977 and 1989.

In 1957, Ounsi contributed along with Yusuf Al-Khal and Ali Ahmad Said Esber AKA Adunis to the foundation of the poetry magazine Shi'r. In 1960, he released his first book of poetry entitled Lan, the first compilation of Arabic prose poetry. Beginning in 1963, Ounsi translated several plays by Shakespeare, Ionesco, Camus and Brecht into the Arabic language. These translated works were staged by the Beirut School of Modern Theater during the Baalbeck Festival and under the direction of Nidal Al Ashkar, Roger Assaf, and Berge Vaslian.

Ounsi published numerous works of poetry and books between 1960 and 1994. He published six compilations of his poetry: Lan (1960), The Chopped Head 1963), The Past of Forthcoming Days (1965), What Have You Made with the Gold What Have You Done with the Rose (1970), The Messenger with Her Hair Long Until the Sources (1975), and The Banquet (1994). He also published a book of three volumes of essays entitled Words, Words, Words as well as a book of two volumes of philosophical musings and aphorisms entitled Khawatem. The third volume of the latter is pending publication along with a set of other unpublished works.

Ounsi's works have been translated into a number of languages including English, French, German, Italian, Spanish, Portuguese, Finnish, and Armenian.

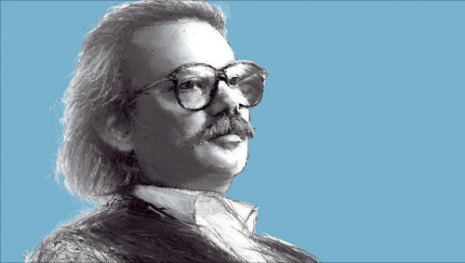
The Poet Anse Al-Haj

In 1994, Lebanese soprano Majida El Roumi released an album entitled "Ibhath Anni" (Look For Me) which featured a title song in classical form with lyrics by Ounsi with operatic string themed music composed by Abdo Mounzer. The lyrics are about a woman calling for her beloved to search for her and seek out their love everywhere in order to find her.

In 1992, Ounsi became Editor-in-chief of An Nahar, a post previously held by his father Louis El-Hage. He held this position until September 2003 after which he acted as a consultant to the Board of Editors.

Ounsi helped found the newspaper Al Akhbar in 2006, where he became the newspapers leading columnist and editorial consultant. He wrote a weekly prose column and weekly commentary that ran in the Saturday edition.

== Personal life and family ==
He was the son of journalist and translator Louis El Hage, and of Marie Akl, from Kaitouli, Jezzine (in South Lebanon)

Singer Fairuz is one of Ounsi's personal friends. Using An Nahar as a platform, Ounsi encouraged her to take control of her life and finances in a move to stress the importance of women's liberty. This is an example of Ounsi's philosophy that uses the arts as a platform for cultural change.

When interviewed about his life, Ounsi once replied in characteristic humility:

"I often told the same history. I don't believe that it is of any interest to anyone.
I have more remorse than achievements, and all that I have done I did without my knowledge.
When nobody used to ask me for my opinion on things, such as love and death, I willingly said the truth,
but then I stopped saying it as soon as there was someone to ask."

Ounsi died on 18 February 2014 after an extended illness.

== Tribute ==
On 27 July 2016, Google Doodle commemorated his 79th birthday.

== Published works ==
=== Compilations of Poetry ===
- Lan (1960)
- The Chopped Head (1963)
- The Past of Forthcoming Days' (1965)
- What Have You Made with the Gold What Have You Done with the Rose (1970)
- The Messenger with Her Hair Long Until the Sources (1975)
- The Banquet (1994)

=== Books ===
- Words, Words,
- Khawatem
