= Hajji =

Honorific title given to Muslims

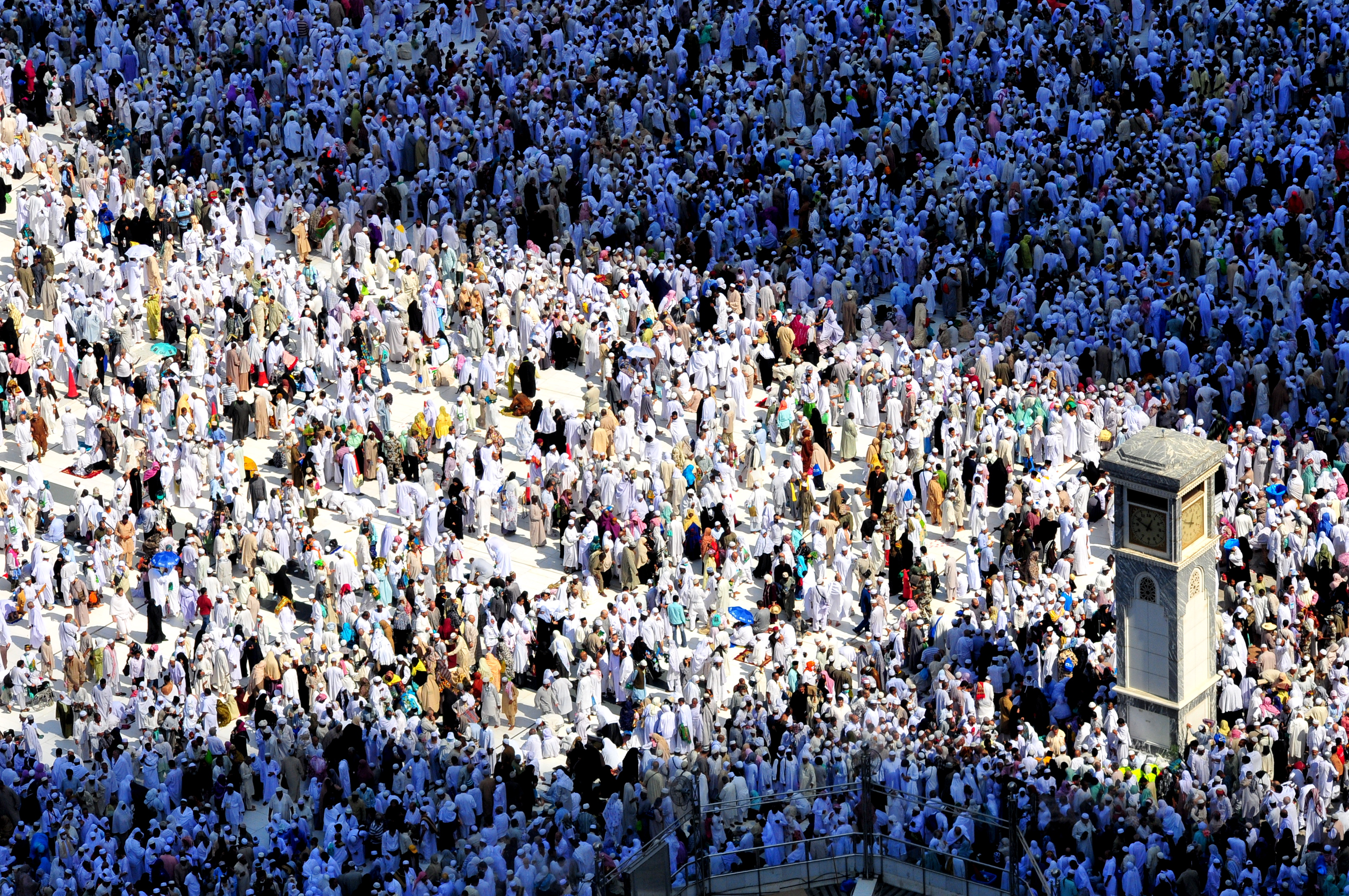
Hajjis in Hajj 2010

Hajji (Arabic: الحجّي; sometimes spelled Hajjeh, Hadji, Haji, Alhaji, Al-Haj, El-Hajj, or Al-Hadj) is an honorific title given to a Muslim who has completed the Hajj, the Islamic pilgrimage to the holy city of Mecca.

== Etymology ==
Hajji is derived from the Arabic ḥājj (حجّ), which is the active participle of the verb ḥajja ('to make the pilgrimage'; حَجَّ). The alternative form ḥajjī is derived from the name of the Hajj with the adjectival suffix -ī (ـی), and this was the form adopted by non-Arabic languages.

== Use ==
Hajji and its variant spellings are used as honorific titles for Muslims who have successfully completed the Hajj to Mecca.

In Arab countries, ḥājj and ḥājjah (pronunciation varies by Arabic dialect) is a commonly used manner of addressing any older person respectfully if they have performed the pilgrimage. It is often used to refer to an elder, since it can take years to accumulate the wealth to fund the travel (particularly before commercial air travel), and in many Muslim societies to a respected man as an honorific title. The title is prefixed to a person's name; for example, Saif Gani becomes "Hajji Saif Gani".

In sub-Saharan Africa, especially Nigeria, the titles Alhaji (male) and Alhaja (female) are given to those who have performed the pilgrimage. Civil rights activist Aisha Yesufu, for instance, has often been referred to as "Alhaja Aisha Yesufu".

In Malay-speaking countries, Haji and Hajah are titles given to Muslim males and females respectively who have performed the pilgrimage. These are abbreviated as Hj. and Hjh. (in Indonesian, it is H. and Hj.)

In Iran, the honorific title Hāj (حاج) is sometimes used for IRGC commanders, instead of the title Sardar ('General'), such as for Qasem Soleimani.

=== Other religions ===
The term was borrowed in Balkan Christian countries formerly under Ottoman rule (Bulgaria, Serbia, Greece, Montenegro, North Macedonia and Romania), and are used for Christians who have travelled to Jerusalem and the Holy Land. In some areas the title has been fossilised as a family name, for example in the surnames common among Bosniaks such as Hadžić, Hadžiosmanović ('son of Hajji Osman') etc.

In Cyprus, the title is so prevalent that it has also been permanently integrated into some Greek Christian surnames, such as Hajiioannou. This is due to Cyprus's long history of Christian and Muslim influence.

The title has also been used in some Jewish communities to honor those who made a pilgrimage to Jerusalem or other holy sites in Israel.

== Ethnic slur ==
In the 21st century, American soldiers began using the term Haji as slang for Afghans and Arabs (Iraqis in particular). It is used in the way "gook" or "Charlie" was used by U.S military personnel during the Vietnam War.

== See also ==
- Hatzi, a Greek surname prefix, stemming from the same origin
