= Labovë e Madhe =

- Village
- Location within Albania
- Coordinates: 40°12′25″N 20°08′10″E
- Country: Albania
- County: Gjirokastër
- Municipality: Gjirokastër
- Administrative unit: Odrie
- Time zone: UTC+1 (CET)
  - Summer (DST): UTC+2 (CEST)

Labovë, alternatively Labova e Madhe (Great Labova) or Labova e Zhapës (Zappa's Labova), is a village in the former Odrie municipality, Gjirokastër County, Southern Albania. At the 2015 local government reform it became part of the municipality Gjirokastër. It is situated roughly 650m above the sea level.

== Name ==
Afanasy Selishchev (1931), derived Labovë from the Slavic hleb’ meaning bread and Xhelal Ylli (1997) states that is not semantically possible. The suffix -ov-a is a Slavic formation. The root word of the toponym might denote the following: a Lab, an inhabitant of Labëria, the proto-Slavic *lap’ for "leaf", or Bulgarian words for plants like lop (petasites), lopen (verbascum), lopuh (arctium tomentosum). The proto-Slavic reflex a in the placename became o in Slavic, while in Albanian its a, with an Albanian sound change of p to b. If the toponym is derived from Lab, Ylli suggests it would mean the incoming Slavs encountered the earlier residents there, the Labs. The etymology from Lab with a Slavic suffix is also supported by Eqrem Çabej, who argues that the village was a Lab foundation outside Labëria.

In Greek the village is known as "Mega Labovo" (Greek: Μέγα Λάμποβο), meaning "Great Labovo".

== History ==
Labovë was one of the Albanian Christian villages in the possession of the House of Muçohysaj, the ancestral house of Ali Pasha.

The village was home of the Greek entrepreneurs and national benefactors Evangelos Zappas and his cousin, Konstantinos Zappas. Because of their family name the town is alternatively called "Labovë e Zhapës" although officially it is still called Labovë. The Zappas sponsored the foundation of educational facilities known as Zappeian School (Ζάππεια Διδασκαλεία). In 1875-1876 this consisted of: a primary and a high school, a weaving school for girls, and a library containing 400 volumes from Greek and Latin authors. Evangelis Zappas participated in 1860 in the debate about Albanian being written and held the view that the language could not become a literary one but should not be abandoned and that a Greek-based alphabet be used for Albanian in the Labovë school founded by him.

In 1913, the village was disputed by Greece and newly independent Albania. Greek forces occupied the village and Greece claimed Labovë due to its Orthodox population, and a large part of southern Albania as North Epirus. Villagers were divided between two groups, one that supported Albanian independence and the other wanting to become part of Greece. According to a local story this is said that happened due to a marriage that time where Albanian songs were sung despite Greek forces having asked to sing in Greek. As such the International Border Commission allotted Labovë to Albania.

At 1929 a proposal to re-establish a school for the Greek-speaking children of Labovë was dismissed by state officials, as according to their report the initiative had not been well received by local Albanian Christians.

== Demographics ==
In fieldwork done by Leonidas Kallivretakis in 1992, Labovë e Madhe was populated by Orthodox Albanians and Aromanians. The Aromanian presence in Labovë dates to the 20th century when during the communist era of Albania they settled in the village.

== Notable people ==
- Kristo Meksi, Albanian politician
- Vangjel Meksi, translator of the New Testament in Albanian
- Evangelis Zappas, Greek benefactor
- Konstantinos Zappas, Greek benefactor
- Petros Zappas, Greek entrepreneur and politician
- Ghica family, Romanian-Albanian noble family
- Meksi family
- Apostol Meksi Albanian folkorist
- Hatzigiannis Mexis, (1754 - 1844) was the first governor of Spetses and shipowner with considerable power and wealth, who played an important role in the Greek revolution of 1821 in which he participated with four of his ships and in the newly formed Greek state. His father was Theodoros Mexis(Meksi in Albanian), an Albanian chieftain of Labovë.
