= Zappas =

Zappas may refer to:

- Evangelos Zappas, Greek philanthropist and businessman
  - The Zappas Olympics, athletic competitions organized by Evangelos Zappas
- Petros Zappas, Greek entrepreneur and politician
- Konstantinos Zappas, Greek entrepreneur and national benefactor

== See also ==
- Zappa (surname)
- Iason Sappas
