= Greek Olympics =

Greek Olympics may refer to:

== Ancient events ==
- Ancient Olympic Games, held in Olympia, Greece
- Pythian Games, held in Delphi, Greece
- Nemean Games, held in Nemea, Greece
- Isthmian Games, held at the Isthmus of Corinth

== Modern Olympics ==
- Zappas Olympics, Olympic revival games held in Athens in 1859, 1870, and 1875
- 1896 Summer Olympics, of the I Olympiad
- 1906 Intercalated Games
- 2004 Summer Olympics, of the XXVIII Olympiad
