= Panathenaic Games =

Festival in ancient Greece

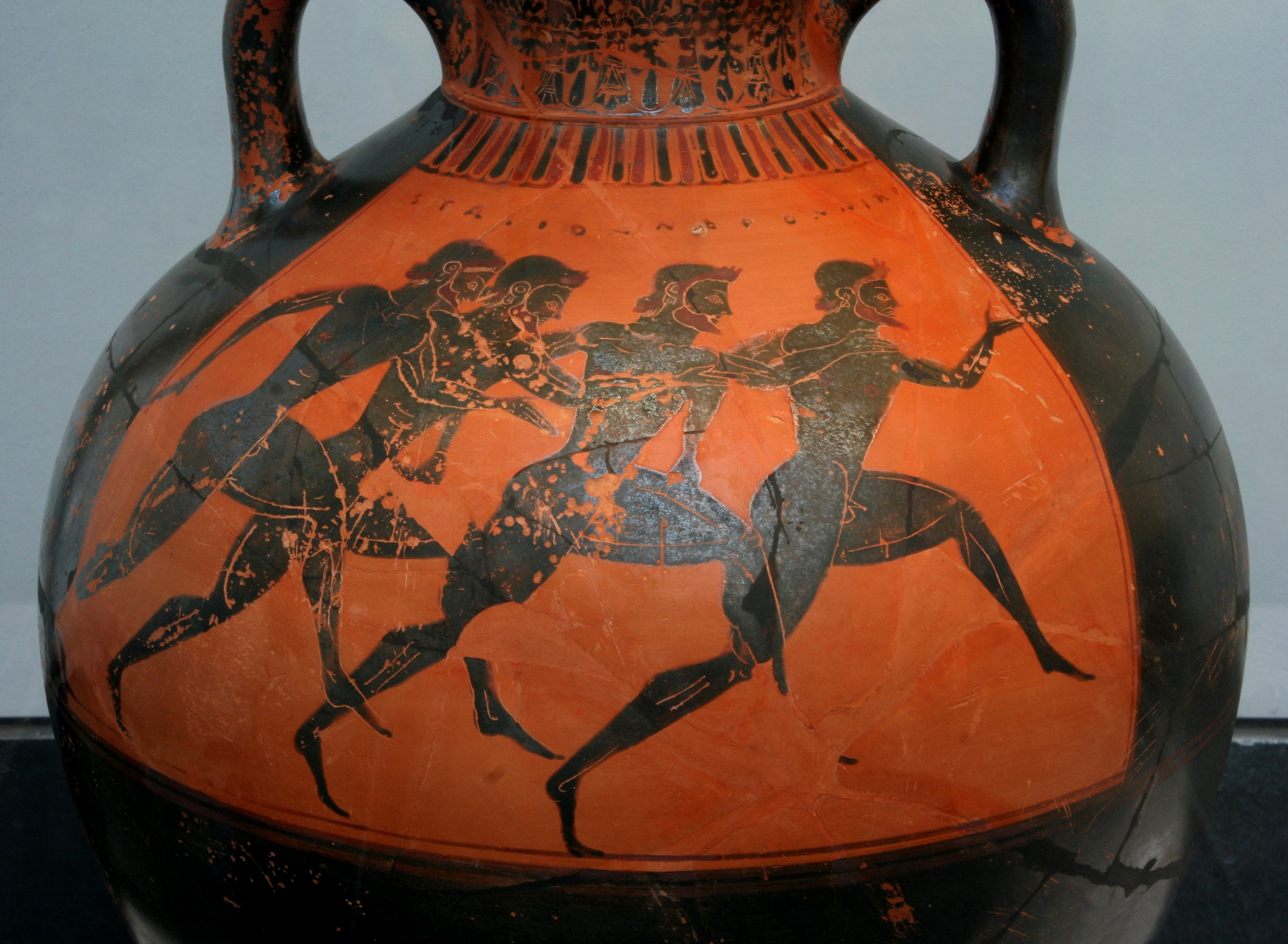
Greek vase depicting runners at the Panathenaic Games c. 530 BC

The Panathenaic Games (Ancient Greek: Παναθήναια) were held every four years in Athens in Ancient Greece from 566 BC to the 3rd century AD. These Games incorporated religious festival, ceremony (including prize-giving), athletic competitions, and cultural events hosted within a stadium.

== History ==
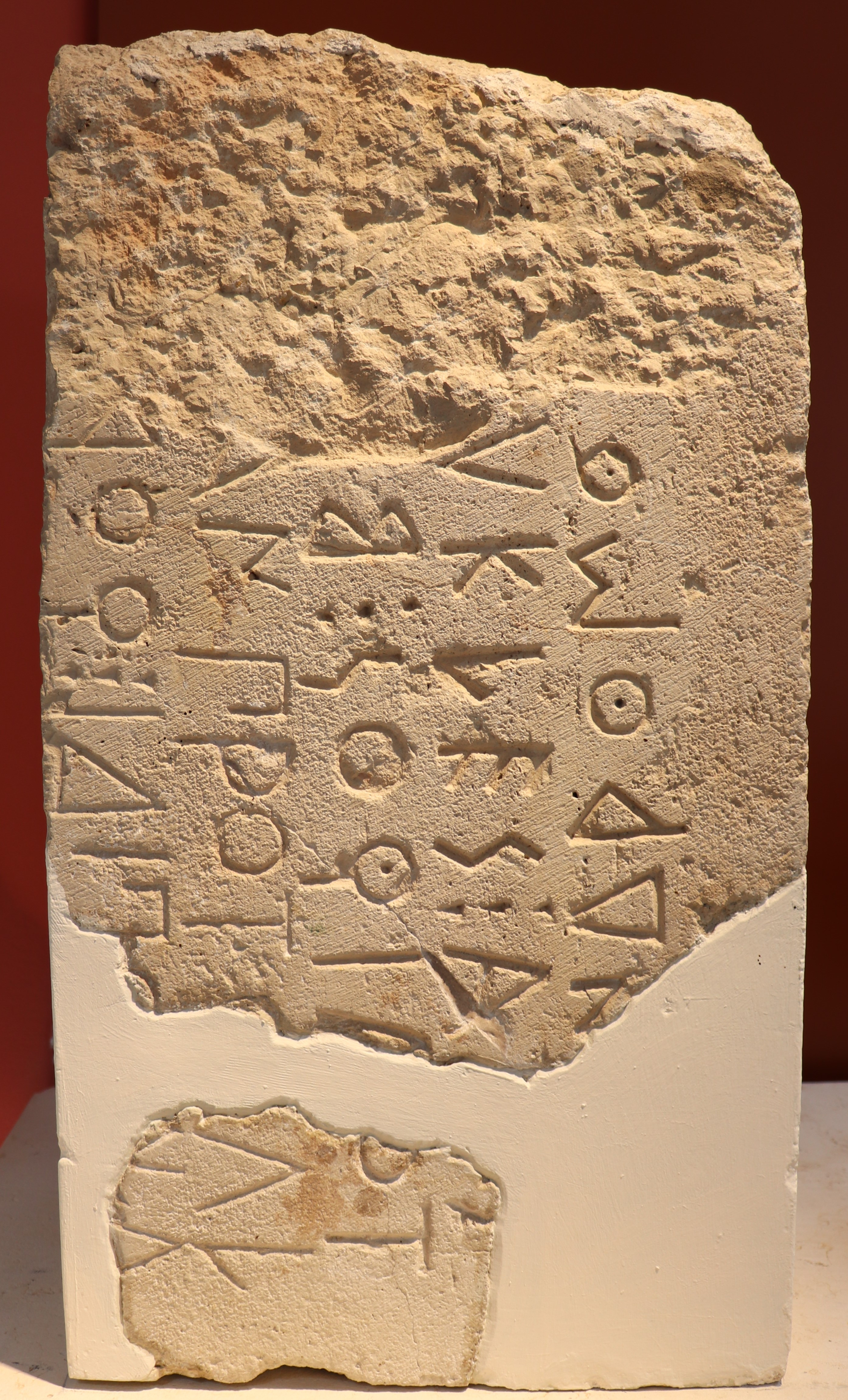
IG I^{3} 507, a dedication to Athena from the first games

The Panathenaic festival was formed in order to honor the goddess Athena who had become the patron deity of Athens after having a competition with the god Poseidon where they were to win the favor of the Athenian people by offering the people gifts. The festival would also bring unity among the people of Athens.

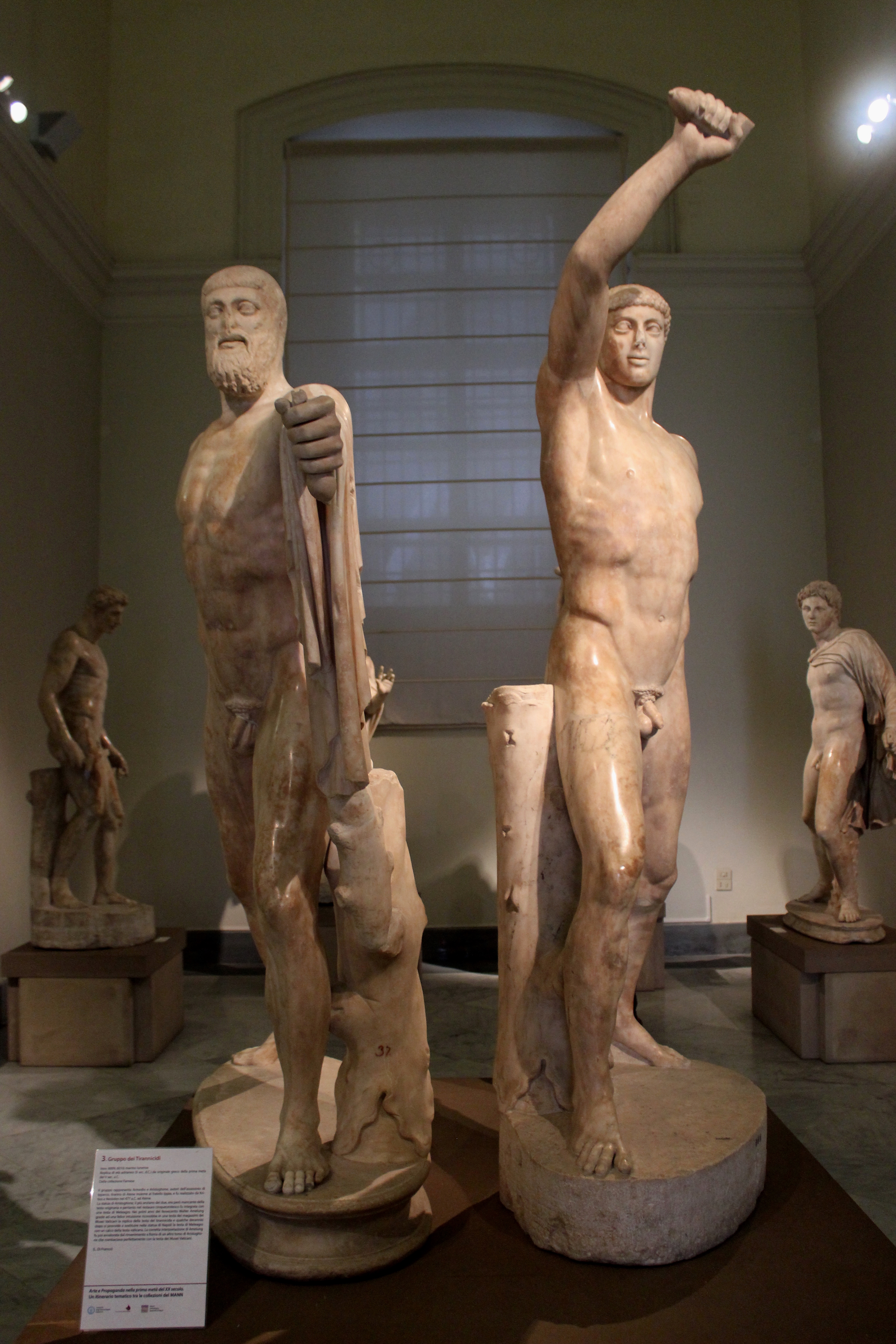
Harmodius and Aristogeiton the tyrannicides

The attempted assassination of the tyrants Hippias and Hipparchus during the Panathenaea in 514 BC by Harmodius and Aristogeiton was often regarded as the birth of Athenian democracy.

Since the birthplace of Athena was held to be Lake Tritonis in North Africa, Athenians allowed North Africans to also participate in the Panathenaic games, considering them to have a similar culture of that of Hellenes. One such successful athlete was prince Mastanabal of Numidia, the son of Masinissa, who won four gold medals in chariot racing for Numidia.

== Events ==
The competitions for which the festival came to be known were part of the Great Panathenaia, a much larger religious occasion. These ritual observances consisted of numerous sacrifices to Athena (the namesake of the event and patron deity to the hosts of the event) as well as Poseidon and others. The Lesser Panathenaia, a sister-event to the Great Panathenaia, was held every year with 3 to 4 days shorter in celebration. The competitions were the most prestigious games for the citizens of Athens, but not as important as the Olympic Games or the other Panhellenic Games.

The Panathenaea also included poetic and musical competitions. Prizes were awarded for rhapsodic recitation of Homeric poetry, for instrumental music on the aulus and cithara, and for singing to the accompaniment of the aulus and cithara (citharody). In addition, the Games included a reading of epic poetry by early poets such as Homer, Pindar and Hesiod.

== The Panathenaic Stadium ==
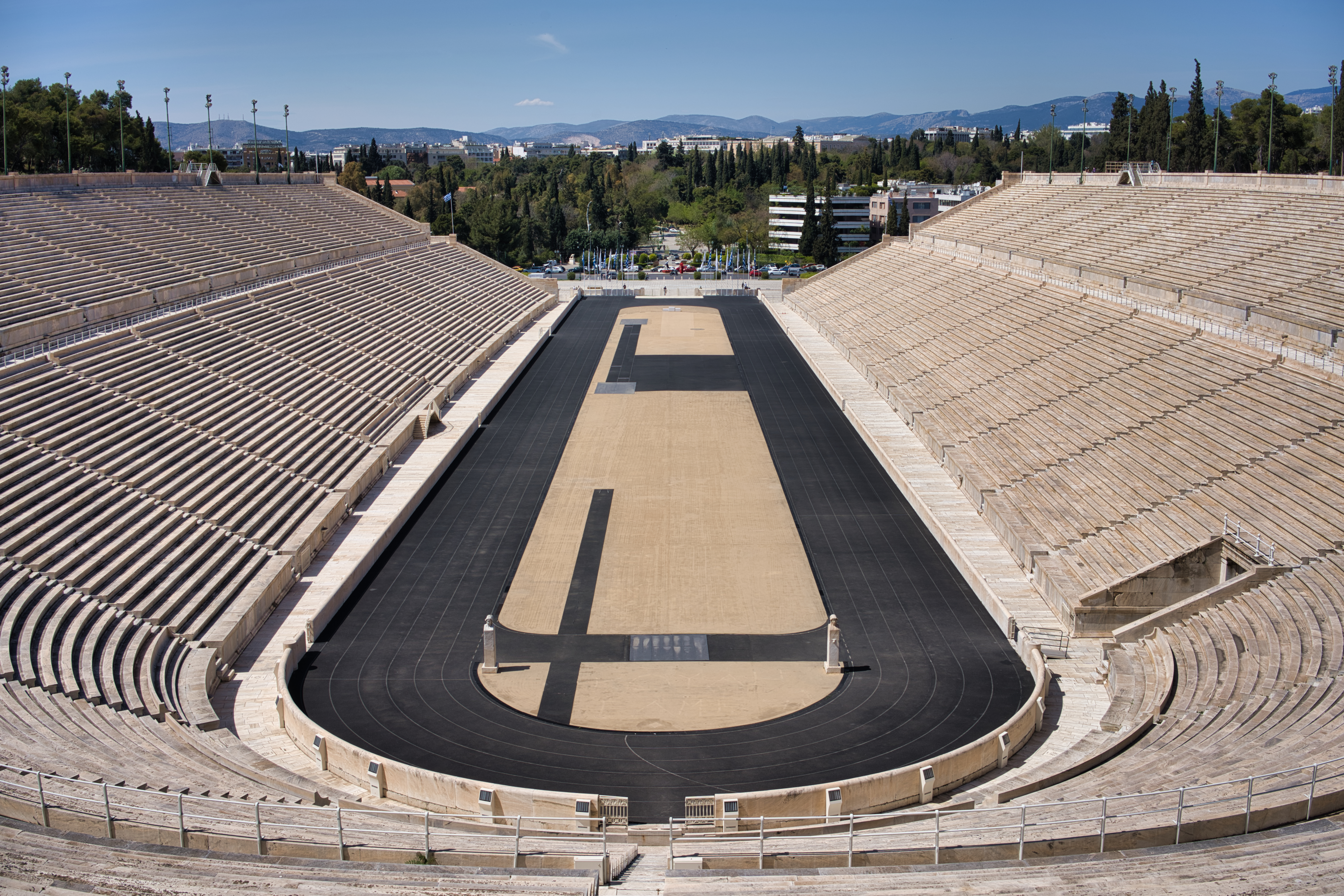
The Panathenaic Stadium in Athens

The athletic events were staged at the Panathenaic Stadium, which is still in use today. In 1865, Evangelis Zappas left a vast fortune in his will with instructions to excavate and refurbish the ancient Panathenaic stadium so that modern Olympic Games could be held every four years "in the manner of our ancestors". The Panathenaic Stadium has hosted Zappas Olympics in 1870, and 1875, as well as the modern Olympic Games in 1896 and 2004. The stadium also hosted the 1906 Intercalated Games.

=== Contests ===
The Panathenaic Games held contests in a number of musical, athletic, and equestrian events. Due to the fact that there were so many contests held, the games usually lasted a little over a week. On a fourth century marble block, experts explain that on the block is written a program for the games, as well as individual events and their prizes. The inscription also says that there are two age categories for the music events but three age categories for the athletic events. According to scholars, the age groups are boys: 12–16; beardless youths: 16–20; men: over 20. One thing that was different about these games than normal funeral games is that prizes were given to runners-up, not just the lone victor.

Using the inscription, experts put together a general program like so:

- Day 1 - Musical and Rhapsodic Contest
- Day 2 - Athletic Contest for Boys and Youths
- Day 3 - Athletic Contest for Men
- Day 4 - Equestrian Contest
- Day 5 - Tribal Contest
- Day 6 - Torch Race and Sacrifice
- Day 7 - Boat Race
- Day 8 - Awarding of Prizes, Feasting and Celebrations

Experts reasonably came up with how the games went based on the order of prizes which were written on the marble block. Wrestling and discus were also included in the contest.

The musical events which took place were Kithara players, Flute players, and singers. The athletic events were the stadion, pentathlon, wrestling, boxing, and pankration. The equestrian events were two-horse chariot race, horse race, and javelin throw on horseback. Based on the inscription, we learn that the prizes given to the men and the youth were different. Men were rewarded a certain amount of drachmas and/or a valuable crown worth a certain amount of drachmas. Boys and youths were given a certain number of amphorae of olive oil.

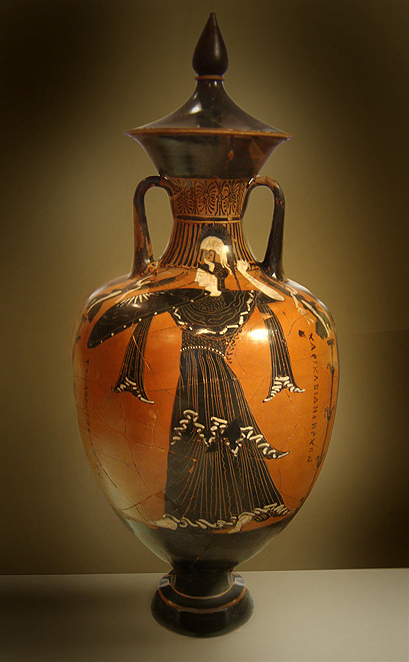
Athena on a Panathenic amphora (National Archaeological Museum of Athens)

=== Ceremony ===
The Panathenaic games were a chrematitic ('monetary') event where the winner would take home prizes with a monetary value, as opposed to stephanitic ('crowned') games like the Olympics which awarded the winner with only a crown. Award ceremonies included the giving of Panathenaic amphorae, which were large ceramic vessels containing olive oil given as a prize. The winner of the chariot race received as a prize one-hundred and forty Panathenaic amphorae full of olive oil.

== In mythology ==
In the myth of the Minotaur, Minos' son Androgeus is killed during the Panathenaic Games. Some accounts, like Pseudo-Apollodorus's Bibliotheca, state he won and his jealous competitors ambushed and murdered him. Others, such as Graeciae Descriptio by Pausanias, say he was trampled to death by a mad bull.

== See also ==
- Athenian festivals
