= Zappeion =

Building in the National Gardens of Athens, Greece

Zappeion Hall
- Ζάππειον Μέγαρο
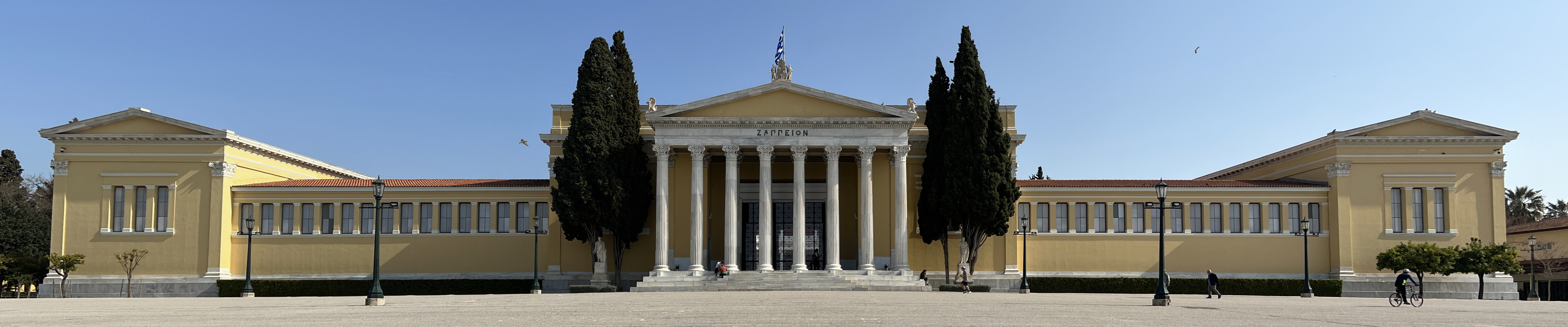

- Location within Athens
- Alternative names: Zappeio

General information
- Status: Conference and exhibition center
- Architectural style: Neoclassical architecture
- Location: Athens, Greece
- Coordinates: 37.970°N 23.737°E
- Construction started: 20 January 1874
- Opened: 20 October 1888
- Owner: Greek state

Design and construction
- Architect: Theophil Hansen

Website
- Official website

The Zappeion (Greek: Ζάππειον Μέγαρο, romanized: Záppeion Mégaro, pronounced [ˈzapi̯on ˈmeɣaɾo]) is a large, palatial building next to the National Gardens of Athens in the heart of Athens, Greece. It is generally used for meetings and ceremonies, both official and private, and is one of the city's most renowned modern landmarks.

== Construction ==
In 1869, the Greek Parliament allocated 80,000 square metres (860,000 sq ft) of public land between the Palace Gardens and the ancient Temple of Olympian Zeus, and passed a law on 30 November, "for the building works of the Olympic Games", as the Zappeion was the first building to be erected specifically for the revival of the Olympic Games. The ancient Panathenian stadium was also refurbished as part of the works for the Olympic Games. Following some delay, on 20 January 1874, the cornerstone of the building was laid; this new building would be designed by Danish architect Theophil Hansen. Finally, on 20 October 1888, the Zappeion opened. Unfortunately for its benefactor, Evangelis Zappas, he did not live long enough to see the Zappeion built. He had nominated his cousin, Konstantinos Zappas, to complete the building. The Austrian Parliament Building was also designed by Hansen and followed the same theme in the exterior.

The head of Evangelos Zappas is 'buried' inside a wall in the Zappeion.

The building contains about 25 distinct rooms that range in size from 97 square metres (1,044 sq ft) to 984 square metres (10,592 sq ft).

== History ==
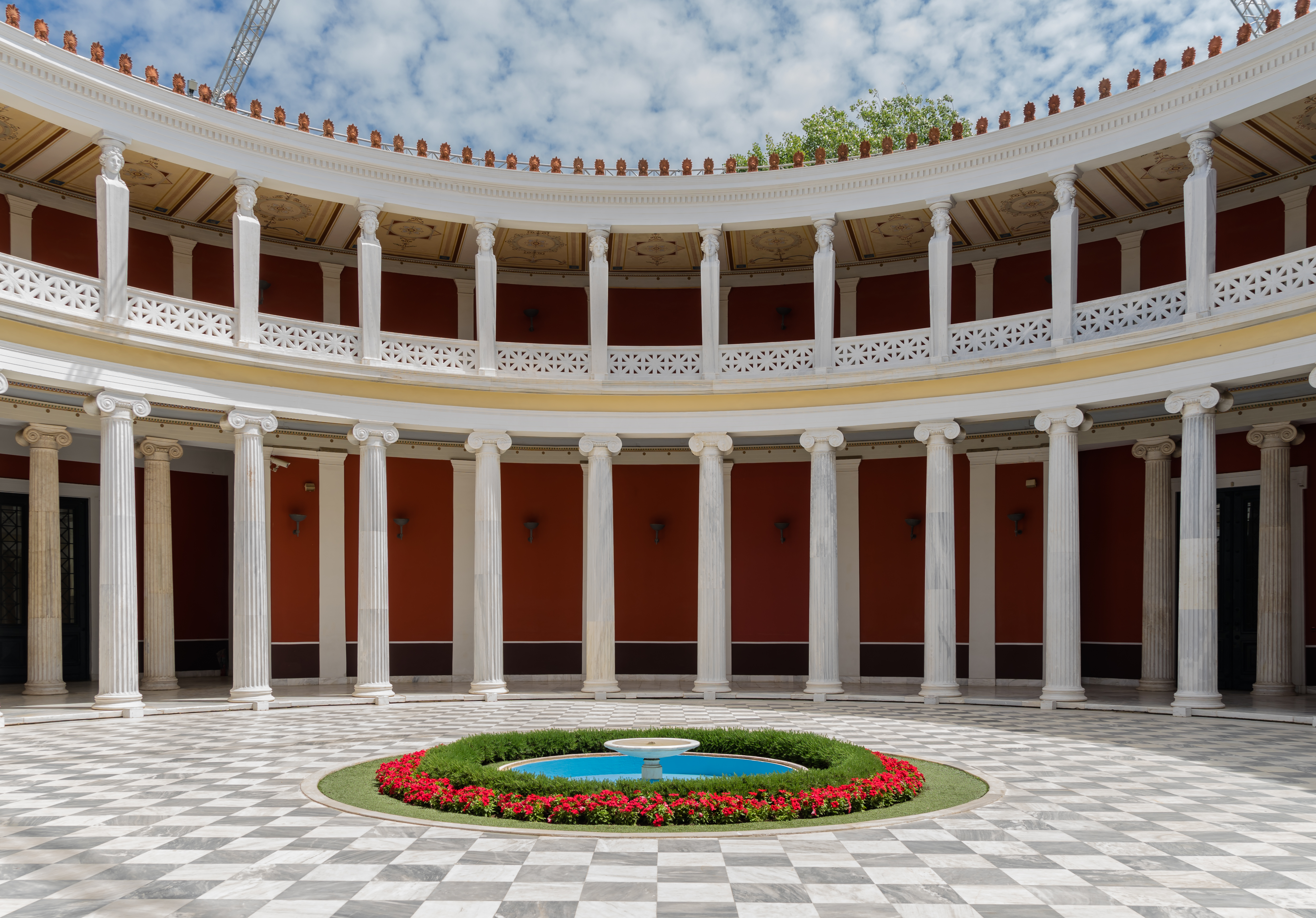
The atrium at the Zappeion convention center

The Zappeion was used during the 1896 Summer Olympics as the main fencing hall. A decade later, at the 1906 Intercalated Games, it was used as the Olympic Village. In 1938, the Athens Radio Station, the country's first national broadcaster, began operating in the premises. The building continued to house the National Radio Foundation until the inauguration of the House of Radio in 1970. The Zappeion served as the first host for the organizing committee (ATHOC) for the 2004 Olympic Games from 1998 to 1999, and served as the press center during the games.

A number of historical events have taken place at the Zappeion, including the signing of the documents formalizing Greece's accession to the European Community in May, 1979, which took place in the building's marble-clad, peristyle main atrium.

The building is currently being used as a conference and exhibition center for both public and private purposes.

== Statues ==
Various statues are placed in the gardens of the Zappeion area.

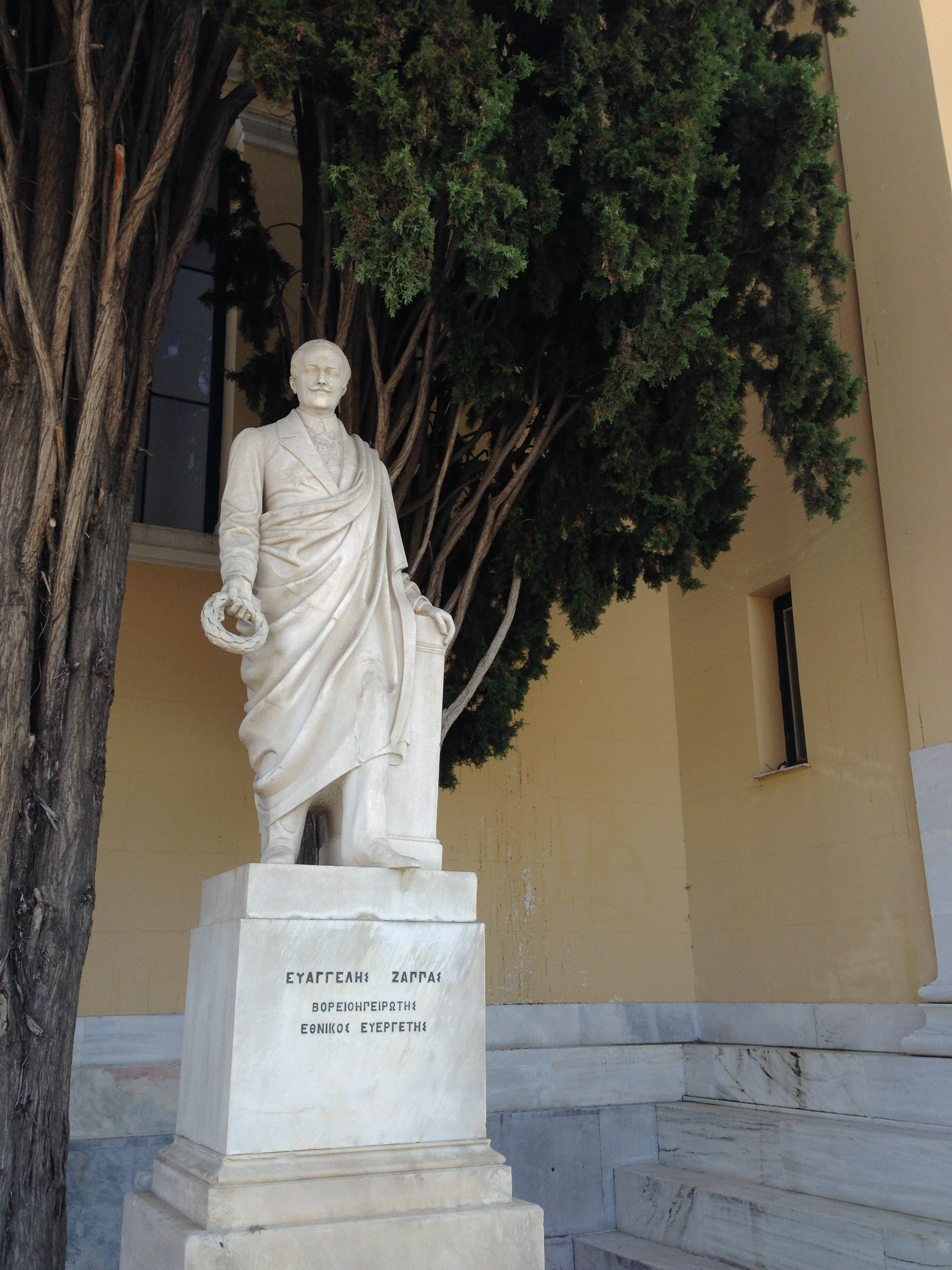
Statue of Evangelos Zappas, by Ioannis Kossos

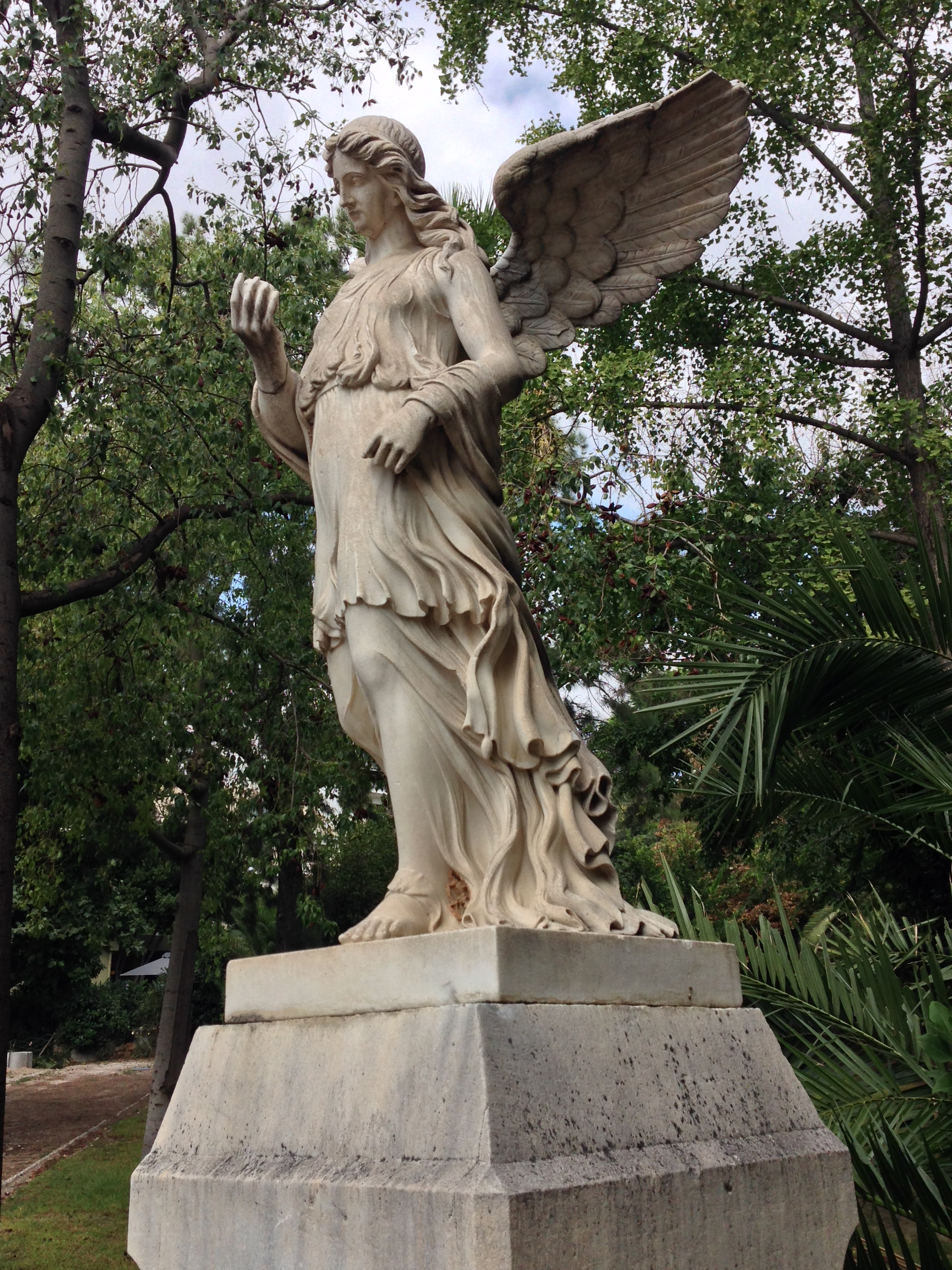
Angel

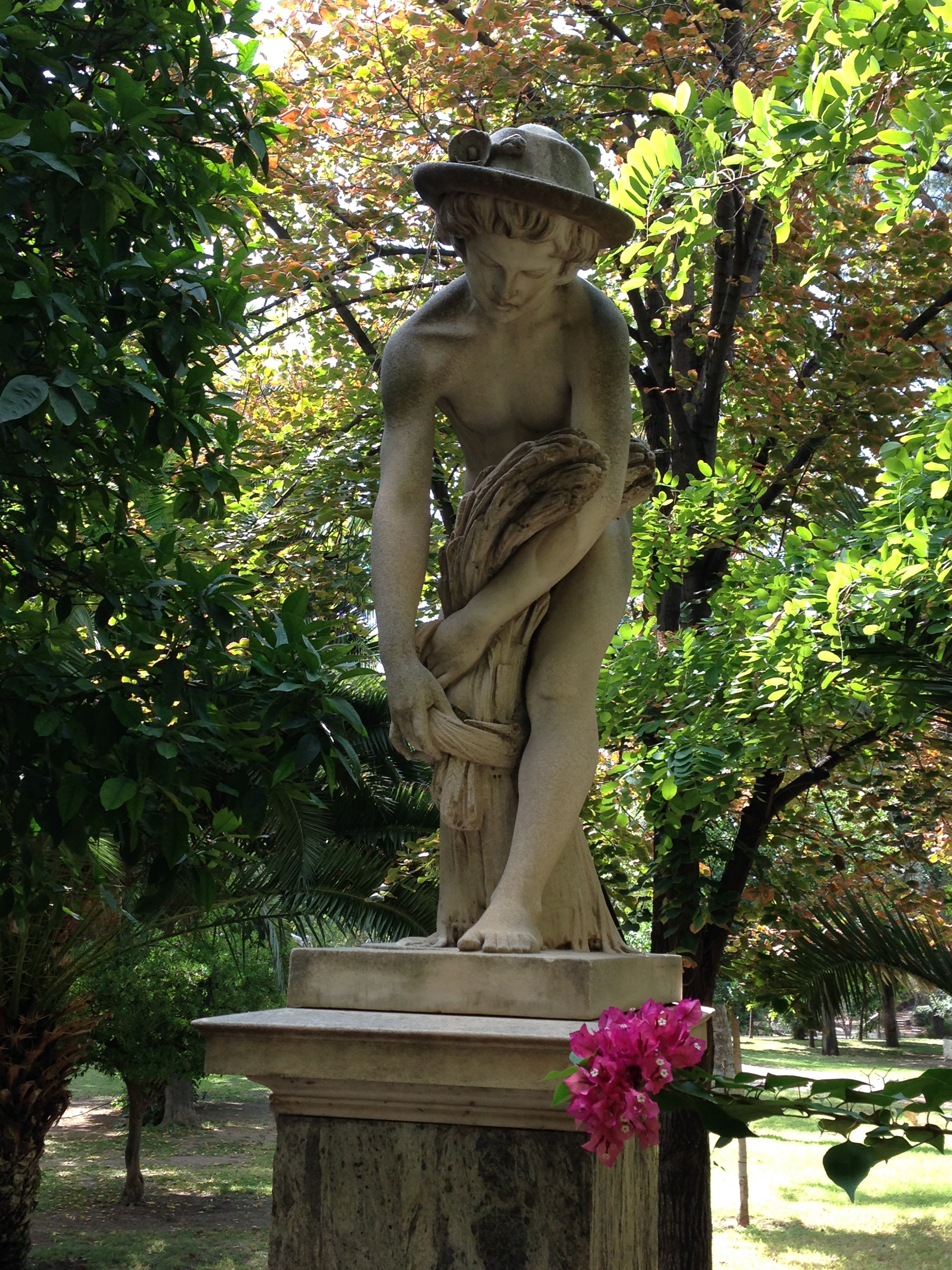
Little mower

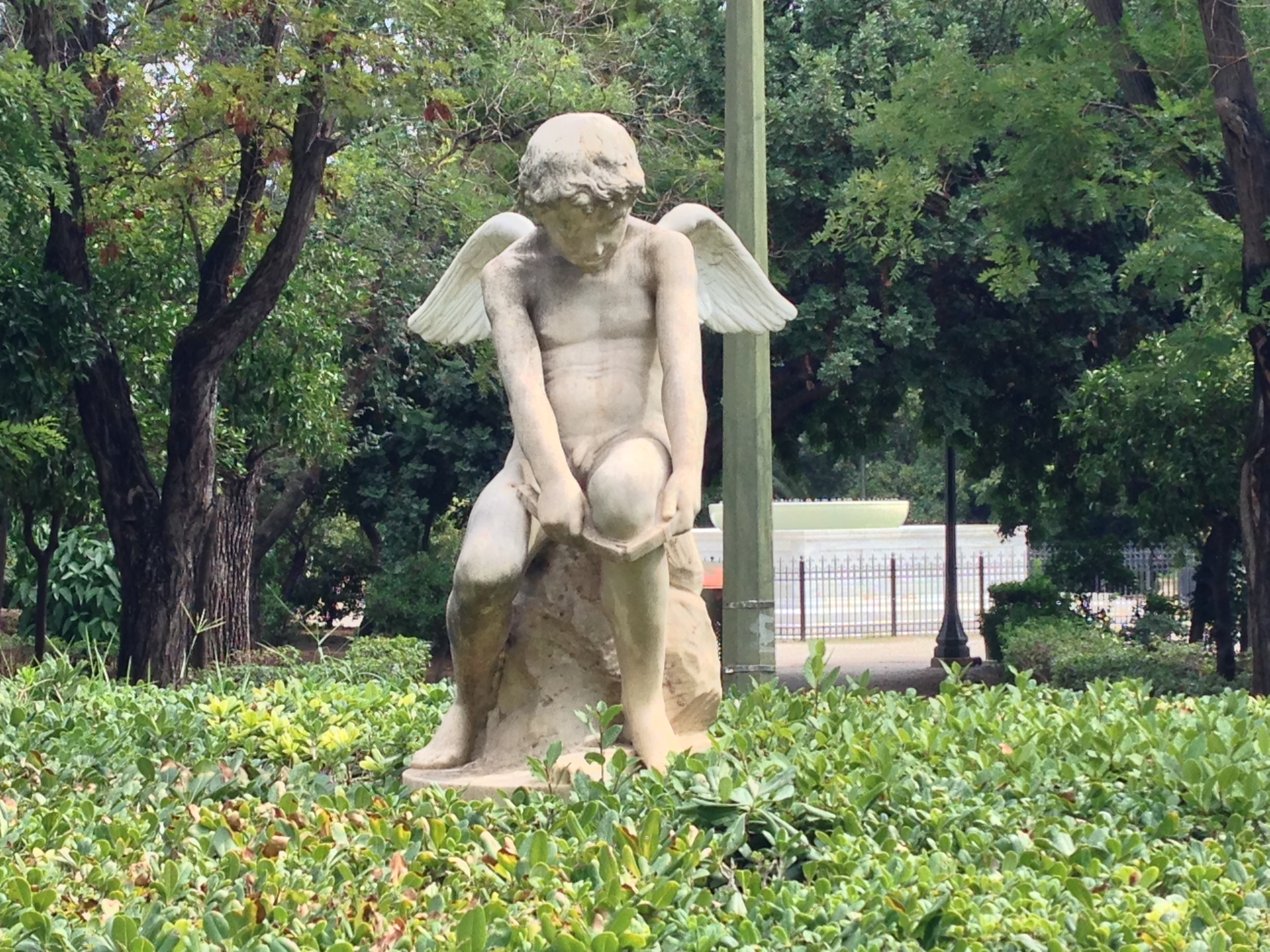
Eros breaking his bow

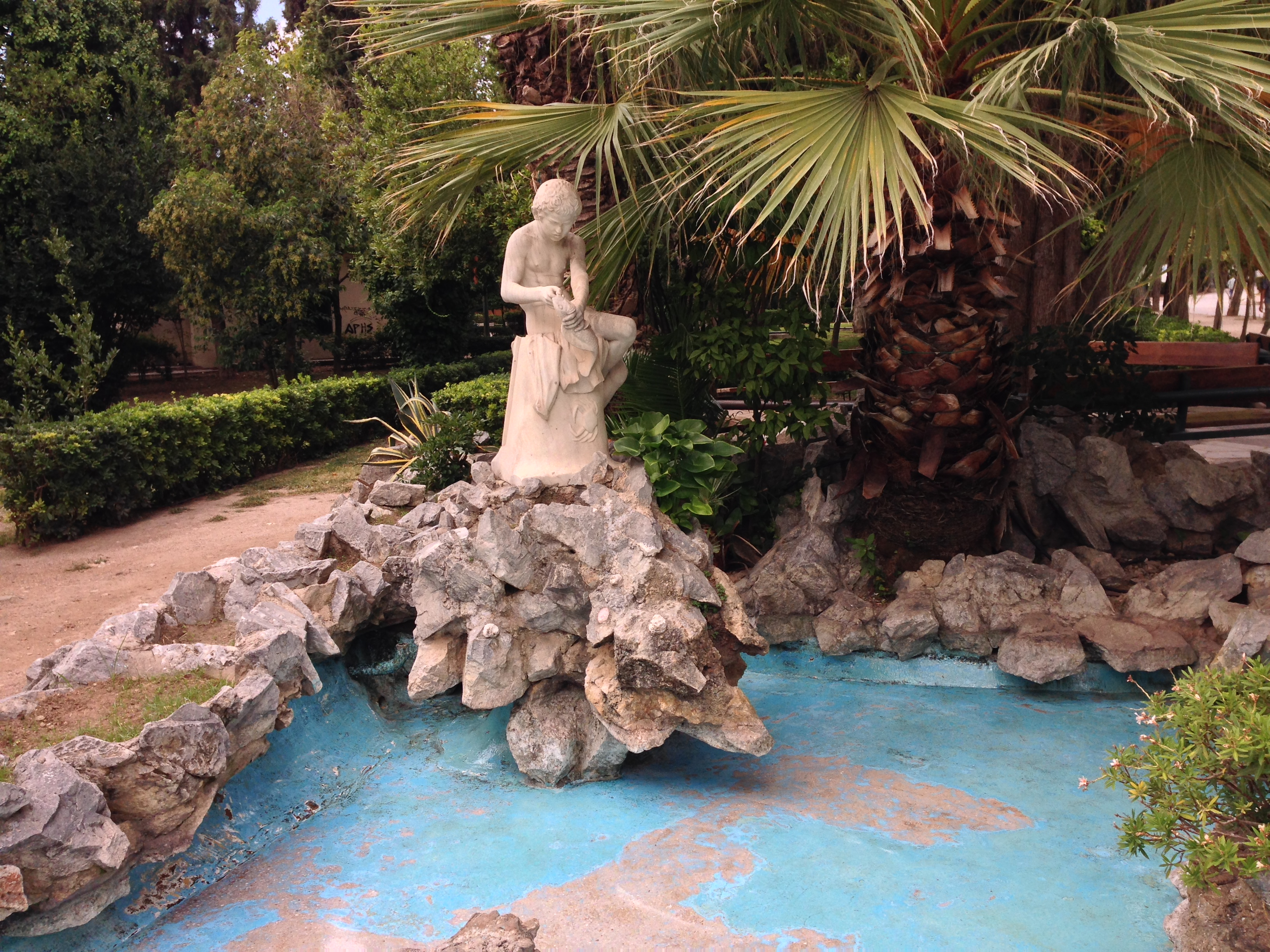
Fisherman

== In numismatics ==
The Olympic Village Zappeion commemorative coin

The Zappeion was depicted on a high-value euro collectors' coin: the €100 Greek Olympic Village Zappeion commemorative coin, minted in 2003 to commemorate the 2004 Summer Olympics. The obverse of the coin has a front view of the building.
