= Evangelos Zappas =

Greek philanthropist and businessman (1800–1865)

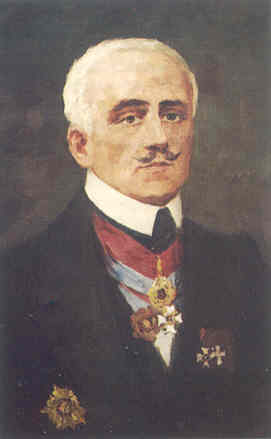
- An 1860 portrait of Zappas
- Born: 23 August 1800; Labovo, Pashalik of Yanina, Ottoman Empire (present-day Albania)
- Died: 19 June 1865 (aged 64); Broșteni, United Principalities of Moldavia and Wallachia (present-day Romania)
- Burial place: Romania (initially); Labovo (body); Zappeion (skull)
- Relatives: Konstantinos Zappas (cousin)
- Military career
- Allegiance: First Hellenic Republic
- Branch: Hellenic Army
- Nickname: Evangelis (Ευαγγέλης)
- Known for: Namesake and benefactor of the Zappeion; One of the founders of the Modern Olympic Games
- Conflicts: Greek War of Independence; First Siege of Missolonghi; Battle of Peta
- Other work: Member of the Filiki Etaireia; Financier of the Romanian Academy

Evangelos or Evangelis Zappas (23 August 1800 – 19 June 1865) was a Greek philanthropist and businessman who is recognized today as one of the founders of the modern Olympic Games, which were held in 1859, 1870, 1875, and 1888 and preceded the Olympic Games that came under the auspices of the International Olympic Committee. These Games, known at the time simply as Olympics (Greek: Ολύμπια), came before the founding of the International Olympic Committee itself. The legacy of Zappas, as well as the legacy of his cousin Konstantinos, was also used to fund the Olympic Games of 1896.

During his youth, Zappas joined the Greek War of Independence (1821–1832), achieving the rank of Major and fighting in several significant battles. Following Greek independence, he moved to Wallachia where he spent most of his life and had a successful career as a businessman, becoming one of the richest men of that time in Eastern Europe. Aside from being the only major sponsor of the Olympic revival at that time, Zappas's philanthropy also included contributions toward the foundation of several Greek institutions and schools as well as sports and exhibition facilities. Zappas was also a financier of the Romanian Academy, including academic projects such as a new synthesis on the history of the Romanians and a Romanian dictionary. He also funded a newspaper and books in the Albanian language in Romania. Through his philanthropic activity, Zappas contributed to the national awakening of the Greeks, Romanians and Albanians.

== Biography ==
=== Early life, military career, and later career in Wallachia ===
Evangelis Zappas was one of three children born to Vasileios Zappas and Sotira Meksi. His paternal origins remain uncertain, with some scholars describing him as being of Greek, Aromanian or Albanian descent. On his mother's side, he descended from the Albanian noble Meksi family, known for their Albanian patriotic figures. The Meksi were part of the wider Doda clan. He was born on 23 August 1800 in the village of Labovo located near Tepelenë (modern Gjirokastër County, Albania) when the region was still under Ottoman rule. Zappas did not receive any education during his childhood. He left his village at the age of 13 and enrolled as a mercenary in the Ottoman militia of the local ruler Ali Pasha. There he started to learn from Petro Meksi, his mother's cousin, who practiced medicine in Ali's guard.

Zappas became a member of the Greek patriotic organization Filiki Eteria and joined his compatriots when the Greek War of Independence broke out in 1821. During this period, Zappas reached the rank of Major in the revolutionary army and became a personal friend of the Souliot captain, Markos Botsaris. After Botsaris's death in 1823, Zappas served under various military commanders of the independence struggle, such as Dimitrios Panourgias, Kitsos Tzavelas, and Michail Spyromilios. He participated in several major conflicts, such as the siege of Souli, the first siege of Missolonghi and the Battle of Peta. In his later correspondence with a Greek official, he claimed that he was wounded five times during the war.

In 1831, Zappas emigrated to Wallachia and made a fortune in land and agriculture. He became a citizen of Wallachia in 1844. In the 1850s, Zappas was considered one of the wealthiest entrepreneurs in Eastern Europe. At the time of his death in 1865, his total wealth was estimated at six million gold drachmas.

=== Revival of the Olympic Games ===
The idea of reviving the ancient Olympic Games had been raised from time to time during the early and mid 19th century, inspired to a certain degree by romanticism and patriotism. In 1833, the romantic poet Panagiotis Soutsos, in his work Dialogue of the Dead, proposed the revival of the Games in the newly formed Greek state, as part of the revival of ancient Greek tradition. In 1852, archaeologist Ernst Curtius stated during a lecture that the Olympic events would be revived.

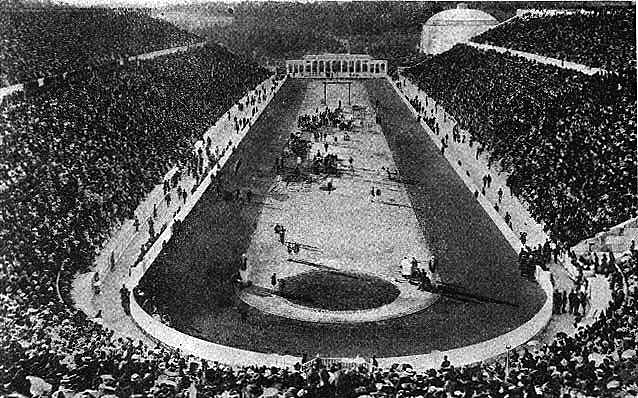
Panoramic view of the Panathenaic Stadium (1906).

Zappas was notably inspired by Panagiotis Soutsos and resolved to revive this ancient tradition through his own efforts and resources. Jim Resiler argues that Zappas was an ardent Greek nationalist influenced by the writings of Soutsos. In early 1856, he sent a letter through diplomatic channels to King Otto of Greece, offering to fund the revival of the Olympic Games, and to provide cash prizes to the victors. However, this initiative was not without opposition. There was wide belief among some Greek politicians that athletic games were a throwback to ancient times, unsuited to the modern era. Alexandros Rizos Rangavis, the Greek foreign minister and head of the conservative anti-athletics lobby in Athens, suggested an industrial and agricultural exposition instead of an athletics event. For months there was no official answer from the Greek state. In July 1856, an article in the Greek press by Panagiotis Soutsos made Zappas's proposal widely known to the public and triggered a series of events. King Otto agreed to the organization of athletics competitions at four-year intervals, with Zappa's full sponsorship, to coincide with industrial and agricultural expositions. As a result, Zappas provided the Greek government with the necessary financial resources to establish an Olympic Trust Fund.

On 15 November 1859, the first Olympic Games was held in a city square in central Athens. These athletic contests were the first Olympic Games of modern times with the provenance of ancient Greek roots and the intention of using an, as yet unready, ancient Greek stadium. That stadium, the Panathenaic Stadium, was first used for a modern Olympic Games in 1870 and for the first time since the ancient Panathenaic and Olympic Games. The athletes competed in a variety of disciplines, similar to that of the ancient Olympic Games: running, discus, javelin throwing, wrestling, jumping, and pole climbing.

Zappas left a fortune for the funding of future Olympiads to be held at the Panathenaic stadium. He died in 1865. His immense fortune was used for the construction of permanent sporting facilities in Athens, as well as for the continuation of the Olympiad. He also instructed on the building of the Zappeion exhibition and conference center, which is named in his honour and that of his cousin Konstantinos Zappas.

== Legacy ==
=== Establishment of the modern Olympic Games ===
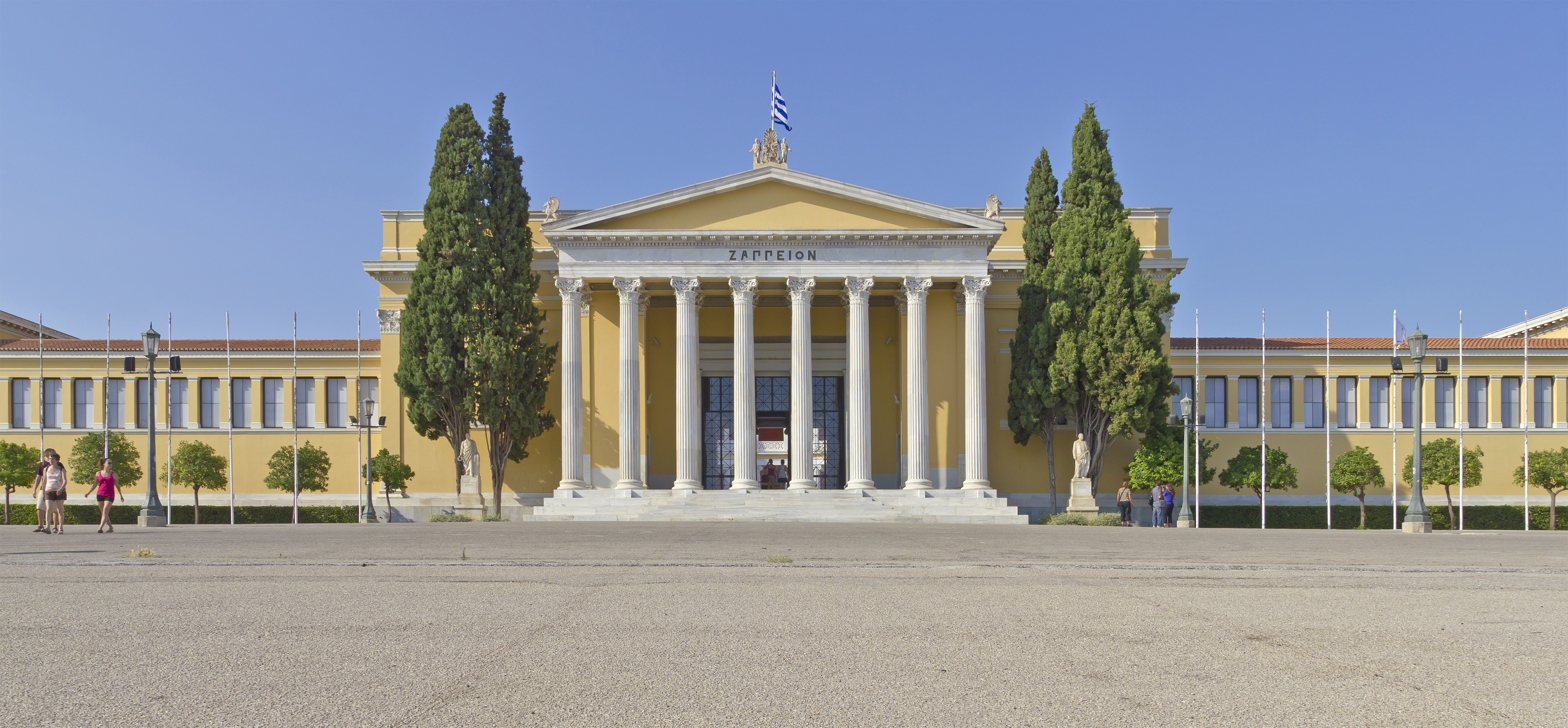
Zappeion exhibition center.

After Zappas's death, and wholly due to the Greek government ignoring Zappas's instructions to refurbish the stadium in marble, it was necessary to refurbish the Panathenaic stadium a second time, replacing wood for marble, in readiness for the Athens 1896 Olympic Games. After a period of litigation over Zappas's bequests, his cousin Konstantinos Zappas continued and expanded his endowment of the Games and maintained efforts for the continuation of the Olympic concept. In 1870, the new stadium, with a spectator capacity of 30,000, was ready to host the second Zappas Olympics. The Zappas Olympics of 1870, apart from being the first modern international Olympic Games to be hosted in a stadium, were better attended and hosted more events and athletes, and were much better organized in general. Additionally, the first modern Olympic building was built to support the contests (and hosted the fencing events of 1896), as well as an industrial exhibition that anti-athletic members of the Greek government had forced upon the concept of the Games. This building, located near the city's National Garden, was entirely funded by Zappas's legacy and was named Zappeion after him. The Zappeion officially opened on 20 October 1888.

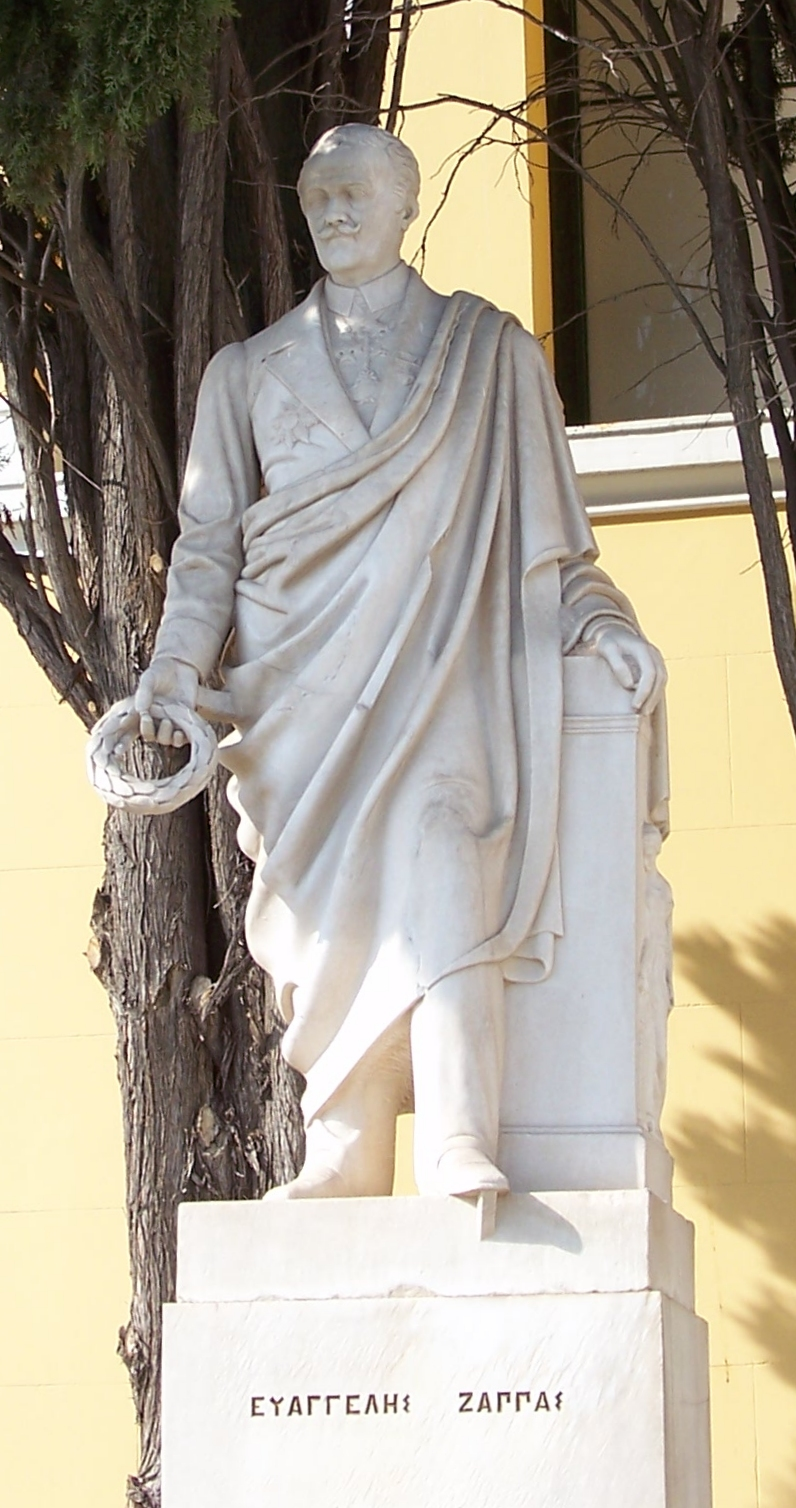
Statue of Zappas in front of the Zappeion (made by Ioannis Kossos).

Dr. William Penny Brookes, from the United Kingdom, further developed his Olympian Class sports events held in Much Wenlock in the 1850s, by adopting some events from the 1859 Athens Olympic Games into the programme of future Wenlock Olympian Games. Baron Pierre de Coubertin from Paris, France, was, in part, inspired by Dr. Brookes, and went on to found the International Olympic Committee in 1894.

Professor David C. Young, of the University of Florida (Gainesville), noted:

Had it not been for Zappas, the Athens Games of 1896 surely would not have taken place. Zappas's actions, his will and the previous tradition of Zappas Olympic Games had made [Crown Prince] Constantine [of Greece] an advocate of Olympic Games before the formation of the IOC in 1894.

=== Philanthropy ===
Through his philanthropic activity, Zappas contributed to the national awakening of the Greeks, Romanians and Albanians. Apart from his efforts to revive the Olympics, Evangelos Zappas made several philanthropic donations towards the foundation of schools, libraries and other similar institutions all over the Ottoman-occupied world, and notably their birthplace, Epirus. Greek schools were founded and expanded in several villages and towns, such as Labovo, Lekli, Nivani, Dhroviani, Filiates, Delvina, Përmet. In Constantinople, education facilities were also founded that included nurseries, primary and secondary schools, which were collectively known as the Zappeion Institute. Moreover, a large amount of money was deposited in the National Bank of Greece to provide scholarships for Greek agricultural students in order to conduct postgraduate studies in Western Europe. Evangelos Zappas participated in 1860 in the debate about Albanian being written and held the view that the language could not become a literary one but should not be abandoned and that a Greek-based alphabet be used for Albanian in the Labovë school founded by him.

During the anti-Greek Istanbul Pogrom in 1955, the facilities of the Zappeion female college in the Turkish capital were vandalized by the fanatical mob and a statue of him was broken into pieces.

In addition to donations to the Greek state, Zappas was also a financier of the Romanian Academy where he has a statue there today. According to V. A. Urechia, Zappas declared "I am Romanian too". Among academic projects funded by him were a new synthesis on the history of the Romanians and a Romanian dictionary. He also funded a newspaper and books in the Albanian language in Romania. In this context, according to Constantin Iordachi, Zappas adopted multiple identities related to his birthplace (Albania), purported ethnic origin (Greek), and his adopted country (Romania). Tchavdar Marinov argues that, in similar fashion with other 19th century Orthodox intellectuals, it is unclear to what degree Zappas was Greek and to what degree Albanian, and he is also claimed by Romania. In Romania, statues of Zappas exist at the Romanian Academy and the Romanian Olympic and Sports Committee in Bucharest, and one in Broșteni.

=== Resting place ===
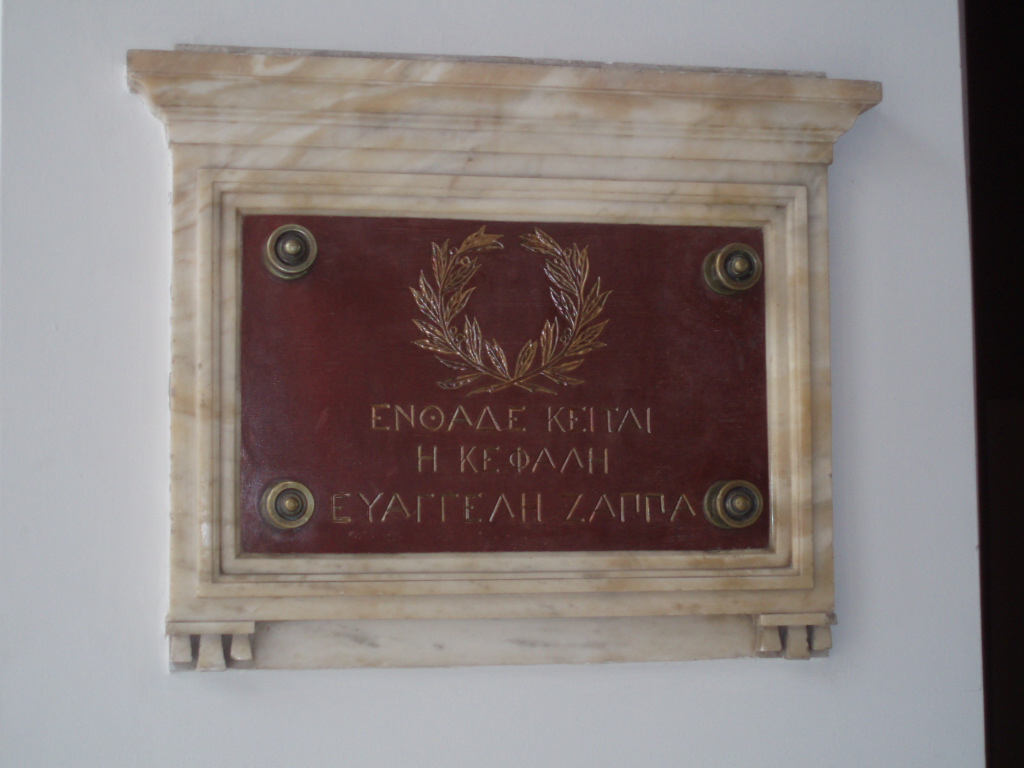
Crypt of Evangelos Zappas at the Zappeion.

His cousin, Konstantinos Zappas, was the executor of his will and he continued Evangelis Zappas' philanthropic works through his legacy. Zappas's wish was to be initially buried in Romania, where he lived most of his life. But after four years his bones were exhumed and reinterred at the school's courtyard in Labovo where he was born, and his skull was enshrined beneath his memorial statue outside the Zappeion in Athens, Greece. A ceremony for the interment was held at 10am on 20 October 1888 at the Zappeion. Baron Pierre de Coubertin made a similar gesture by having his heart buried at Olympia. In the virtually unpopulated Labovo, there is an old, yet legible, tombstone that states in Albanian: "Here lie the bones of the philanthropist Evangelis Zappas".

== See also ==
- Manthos and Georgios Rizaris
- Georgios Sinas
- Simon Sinas
- Petros Zappas
- Zosimades
