= Odrie =

- Administrative unit
- Location within Albania
- Coordinates: 40°12′N 20°8′E
- Country: Albania
- County: Gjirokastër
- Municipality: Gjirokastër

Population (2011)
  - Administrative unit: 433
- Time zone: UTC+1 (CET)
  - Summer (DST): UTC+2 (CEST)

Odrie is a former municipality in the Gjirokastër County, southern Albania. At the 2015 local government reform it became a subdivision of the municipality Gjirokastër. The population at the 2011 census was 433. The municipal unit consists of the villages Andon Poçi, Hundëkuq, Tërbuq, Labovë e Madhe and Labovë e Vogël.
