= Meksi family =

Noble family from Albania

- Noble house
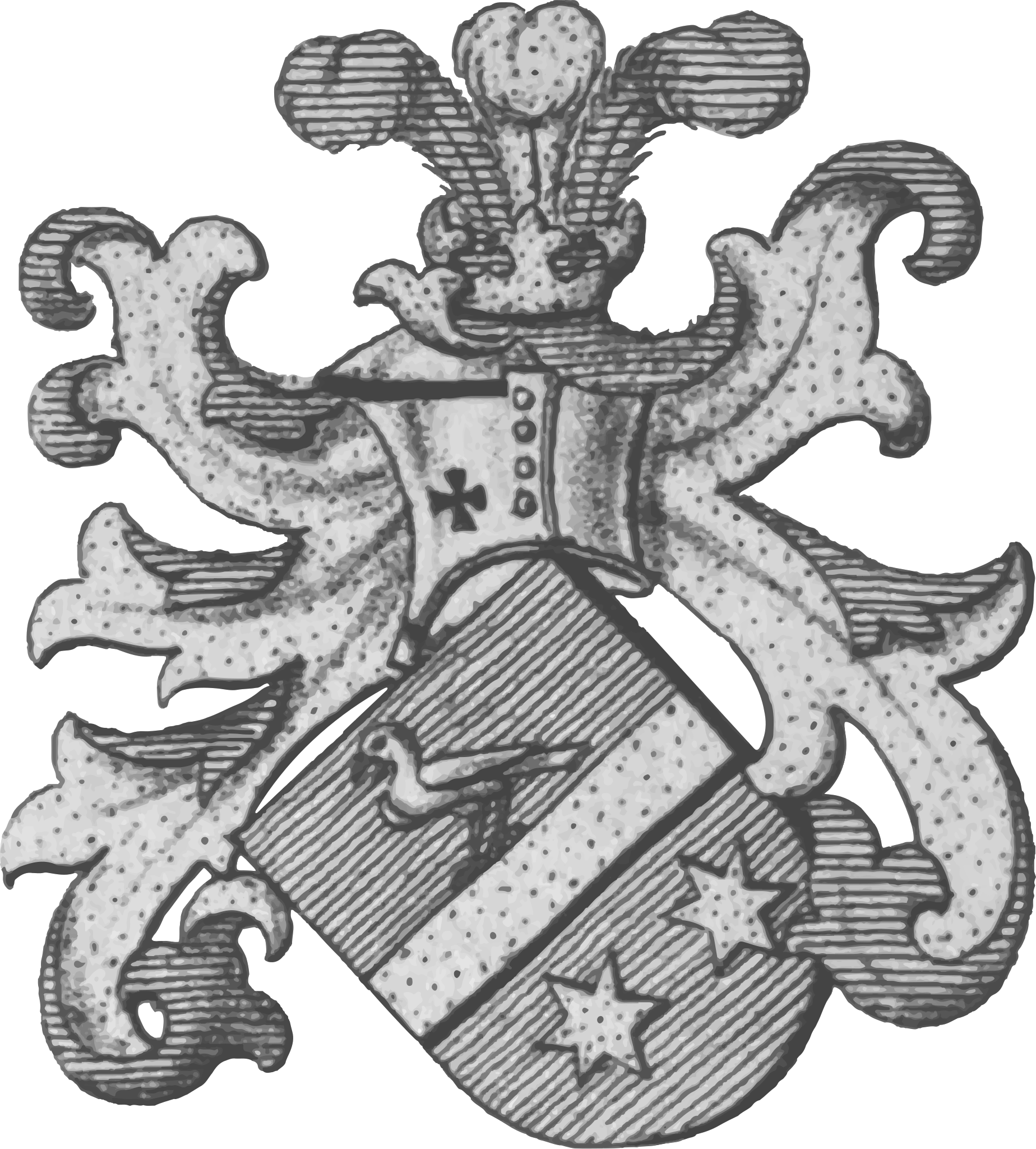
- Coat of arms of the Mexa as depicted in Friedrich Heyer von Rosenfeld's "Wappenbuch des Königreichs Dalmatien", published in 1873.
- Parent family: Bua (tribe)
- Origin: Epirus

The Meksi were a noble Albanian family. Members of this family are found in Albania, Italy and Greece (especially Spetses), whose members distinguished themselves in shipping and politics.

== History ==
The Meksi family appeared around the 10th century in Epirus and is believed to be an ancient branch of the Bua tribe. The military tradition of the family was inherited from Norman invaders who came to Epirus under Robert Guiscard and later entered the service of Emperor Alexios I Komnenos as mercenaries. Over time, these families integrated into the local population, intermarrying with established Epirote and Albanian tribes such as the Bua, contributing to the Meksi family’s mixed Norman–local ancestry. According to Milan Šufflay, the region between Cape Rodon, Kruja and Lezha was inhabited by the Messi, Meksi, Mexi family. The name of the Meksi clan may originate from the function, office or position of its head, who in this particular case must have been a doctor, while the suffix "si" indicates ownership of the country or from the Roman province of Moesia. In this way, it turns out that Messi, Meksi, was a timar that a Byzantine emperor gave to the doctor, who apparently was the first head of the family.

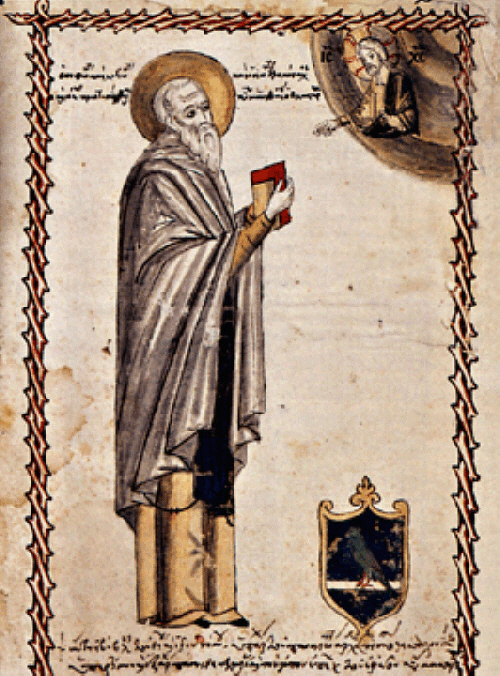
Miniature representation of Matthew Blastares; at the bottom right is the emblem of the Mexis family, of which the owner of the manuscript was probably a member.

It appears that the province in the north of Albania, stretching from the north-east of Lezha to the shores of Shkumbin, inhabited by the Meksi, was included in a single principality at the beginning of the last millennium, with Kruja as headquarters. Then this principality was conquered by the Bulgarian kings as well as by the most powerful Albanian principalities, which were located to the south and north of it. The genealogical tradition of the Meksi family, particularly as preserved in Greek historical accounts and the family's own records, asserts their presence during the pivotal events of the Fourth Crusade in 1204. Misia, a coastal area from the White Drin towards the Adriatic and the village of Mes took their name from this tribe. Sebastos Petrus Messia or Misie, appears among the Albanian dynasts or barons in negotiations with the Kingdom of Naples in 1272 and 1274. Shkodër Land Registry of 1416–1417 names a Pietro Mexa in 1445 and a Vucha Messi appears in 1614 as head of the village of Muriqi near Shkodër. During the period of the successful struggles of the Albanian people for freedom, under the leadership of Skanderbeg, the family made an outstanding contribution, which is proven by many documents of the time. Immediately after the complete conquest of Albania by the Turkish hordes, the Meksi family moved in several directions: Dalmatia, Republic of Venice, Italy, Moravia and especially towards the South.

A branch of the family was established in medieval Kotor, where it appears in sources under the forms Mekša, Mexa, Mechsa and Mechxa. The family is documented in Kotor from at least 1326 and is described by Marica Malović-Đukić as a Kotor patrician family whose members were active for four generations in commerce and civic affairs. They traded in Kotor, Dubrovnik and Serbia and maintained commercial partnerships with merchants from the Zeta coast, Dubrovnik, Venice and Serbia. The family's most prominent member was Marin Mekša, a wealthy merchant involved in the trade of silver, salt, textiles and other goods. He owned property in Kotor, Dubrovnik and Serbia and served in important civic positions in Kotor. In 1332, he acted as an envoy of King Stefan Dušan of Serbia to Venice, where he negotiated the settlement of Kotor's debts to Venetian merchants. The family remained prominent in Kotor during the 14th and early 15th centuries. Descendants participated in trade with Dubrovnik and Serbia and represented Kotor in diplomatic negotiations. The family's medieval name appears in several forms, including Mecsa, Mechsa, Mexa, Mechxa and Mexich.

Members of the family offered military services to the Republic of Venice, especially standing out in the Ottoman–Venetian wars of 1465. Famous stradioti and member of the family, Mexa Buziqi, aided his relative Theodore Bua and Krokodeilos Kladas in the revolt against Ottoman Empire in Morea. Initially, the family bore the surname Mexis, but later it changed to De Mezzi or Mezan. The last name of the family has changed according to the language of the countries where they have lived. In Albania, ks (Meksi) or s, ss (Mesi, Messi) is used. In the provinces that were occupied by the Venetians during the Middle Ages or that were relocated to Italy ss (Messi, Da Messa), in the Republic of Venice, according to the local dialect, z or zz (De Mezzi, Da Mezan) and in Kotor in Dalmatia x (Mexa). From the Meksi family clan, new family branches with a new surname emerged and were created. Initially, from the times of the Venetian rule and perhaps even earlier, the Boziki or Bouziki, Kloza, Gerbesi, and Kondylis families emerged. The prevailing surname Boziki (from the Albanian words bujshëm or bujë), probably came from the skillful use of the mace in battles by the Meksi soldiers. It was the first and most important family of the Albanians, as testified by a document of the Venetian Senate: "Busichi, prima fameglia de Albanexi". The House of Wettin is descended from the Buzici tribe, creating an etymological link to the Buziqi–Meksi family. Through this connection, the Meksi family and House of Wettin are believed to share a distant ancestral bond. The part of the family that emigrated in Greece, fought in the Greek War of Independence. In Spetses, the family was the wealthiest and most wellknown family, distinguishing themselves in shipping and politics, as well as heroes of the revolution.

== Members ==
- Kristo Meksi, Albanian politician
- Vangjel Meksi, translator of the New Testament in Albanian
- Evangelis Zappas (through his mother Sotira Meksi), Greek benefactor
- Apostol Meksi, Albanian folkorist
- Aleksandër Meksi, former Prime Minister of Albania
- Hatzigiannis Mexis, was one of the most important figures from Spetses in the Revolutionary War of 1821
- Leonidas Drosis (through his mother), Greek neoclassical sculptor
- Ermelinda Meksi, Albanian politician
- Gjon Buzuku (descended from the Boziki branch), Albanian Catholic priest who wrote the first known printed book in Albanian
