= Zappas Olympics =

19th-century athletic events in Athens

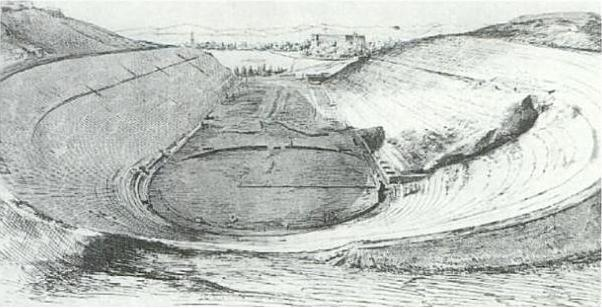
- Panathenaic Stadium in 1870
- Inaugurated: 1859; 167 years ago
- Most recent: 1875; 151 years ago
- Sponsor: Evangelis Zappas
- Headquarters: Athens, Greece

The Zappas Olympics (Greek: Ζάππειες Ολυμπιάδες), simply called Olympics (Greek: Ολύμπια, Olympia) at the time, were a series of athletic events held in Athens, Greece, in 1859, 1870 and 1875, sponsored by the Greek businessman Evangelis Zappas. These games were one of the first revivals of the ancient Olympic Games in the modern era. Their success provided further inspiration for William Penny Brookes in England, whose games had been running since 1850, and the International Olympic Committee series from 1896.

Zappas' contribution in this process was vital: not only were the games hosted at his own initiative, he also provided the funds for the staging of the games, as well as for the construction of much-needed infrastructure, including the refurbishment of the ancient Panathenaic Stadium, which hosted the Games of 1870 and 1875. The same stadium would also host the first IOC Games of 1896, the 1906 Intercalated Games, and archery and the marathon finish at the 2004 Summer Olympics.

In the initial games of 1859, athletes competed in disciplines similar to those of the ancient Olympic games: running, discus, javelin throwing, wrestling, jumping and pole climbing.

== Revival of the Olympics ==
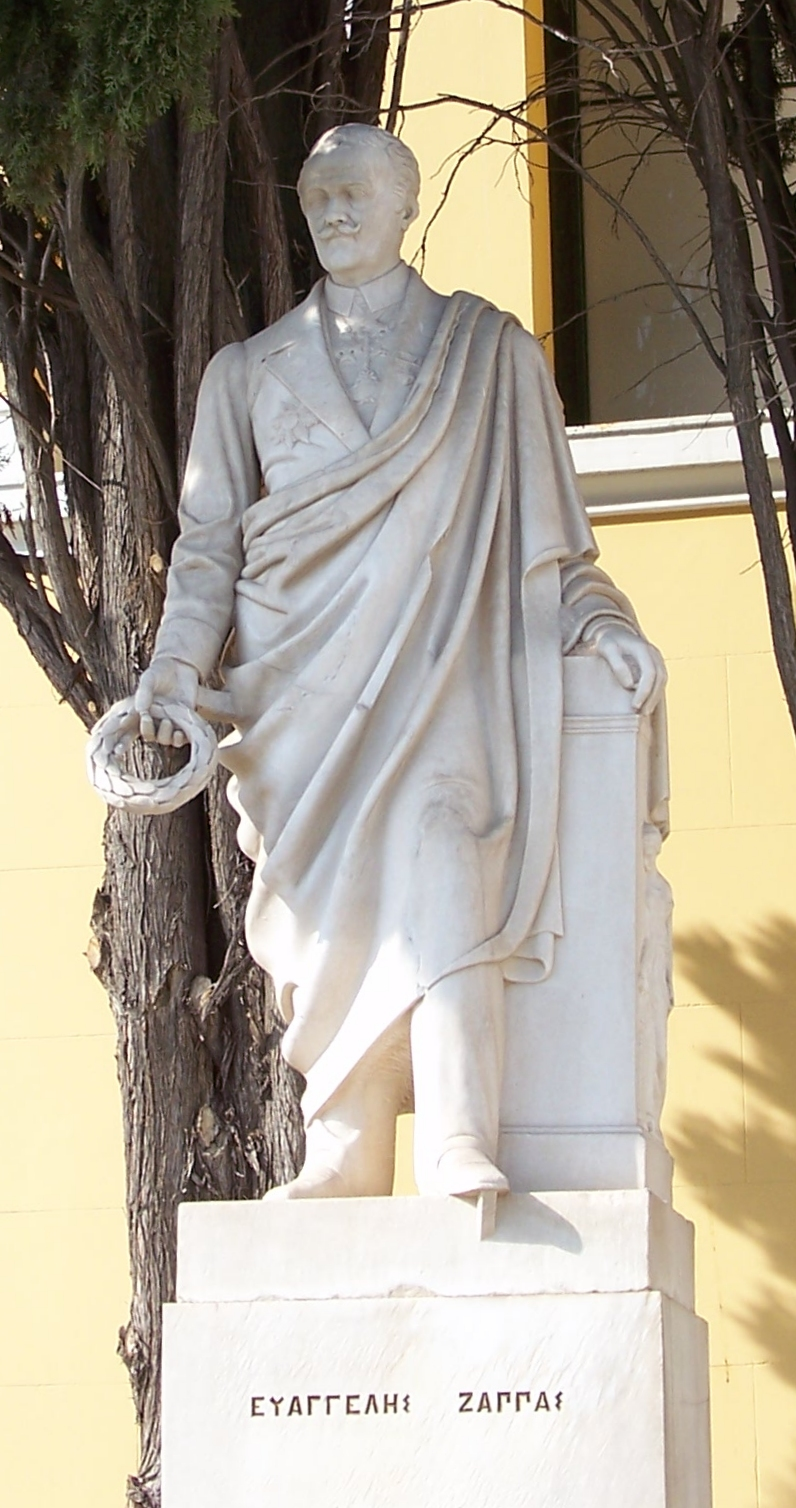
Statue of Evangelos Zappas, sponsor of the Games (a work of Ioannis Kossos).

Sporadic references to the revival of the ancient Olympic Games were made by various personalities during the 19th century, inspired by a certain degree of Romanticism. In his 1833 poem Dialogue of the Dead, the Constantinople-born Panagiotis Soutsos, editor of a Greek newspaper, used the Olympic Games as the symbol of the ancient Greek traditions. Soon after, he explicitly proposed the revival of the games by the newly formed Greek state, even sending a memorandum to that effect to the Greek government in 1835. His proposal was welcomed by King Otto of Greece, but in the event, nothing was done, despite Soutsos' persistent campaigning over the next twenty-six years.

In 1852, the German archaeologist Ernst Curtius, during a Romantic lecture, also stated that the Olympic events would be revived. Evangelis Zappas, a successful businessman and member of the Greek diaspora in Romania, was inspired by Soutsos and resolved to revive this ancient tradition through his own efforts and resources. In early 1856, Zappas sent a letter through diplomatic channels to King Otto of Greece, offering to fund the entire project of the Olympic revival, providing also cash prizes for the victors. However, this initiative was not without opposition. There was a wide belief among part of the Greek politicians (notably Charilaos Trikoupis and Stephanos Dragoumis) that athletic games were just a throwback to archaic times. They feared that Greece would seem primitive among the leading nations of Europe if it revived, as they claimed, an old-fashioned and pagan festival. Characteristically, the Greek foreign minister and head of the conservative anti-athletic lobby in Athens, Alexandros Rangavis, suggested an industrial and agricultural exposition instead of an athletic event:

I thanked Zappas for his [...] splendid idea; but told him also that times have changed since antiquity. Today, nations do not become distinguished, as then, by having the best athletes and runners, but the champions in industry, handwork and agriculture. I suggested that he found [...] Industrial Olympic Games.

For months there was no official answer from the Greek government. In July 1856, an article in the Greek press by Panagiotis Soutsos, which made Zappas' efforts widely known to the public, triggered a series of events. Finally, Otto agreed upon competitions at four-year intervals, on the occasion of industrial and agricultural expositions, and allowed the realization of athletic events with Zappas' full sponsorship. Consequently, Zappas offered the necessary funds to the Greek government in order to establish an Olympic Trust Fund.

== Olympics ==
=== Games of 1859 ===
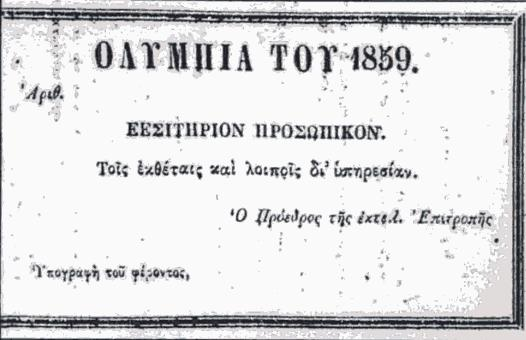
Ticket of the first Zappas Olympics of 1859

On November 15, 1859, the first modern revival of the athletic Olympic Games took place in Athens. As the renovation of the ancient Panathenaic stadium was not yet complete, the contests were held in Loudovikou square in Athens (modern Koumoundourou square). Although they could be termed as the first Olympic Games of the present tradition, it was far from being an international festival. They had a distinctly national character, since the participants were exclusively of Greek ethnicity, coming both from inside the independent Greek state and the Greek diaspora of the Ottoman Empire. Athletes competed in a variety of disciplines, similar to those of the ancient Olympic games: running, discus, javelin throwing, wrestling, jumping and pole climbing.

Attendees included the king, officers and other dignitaries in rows of seats, as well as half of the inhabitants of Athens in the stands. Since it was one of the first mass gatherings in the city's modern history, neither the people nor the police had any previous experience with maintaining the order at such an event. The press of that time lauded the Games as being positive, but they were a disappointment for thousands of Athenians who could not see anything from the rear stands and who did not understand this kind of event. The site was also unsuited for the sports and the weather was too cold. Moreover, the athletic competition had a more game-like than sportive character: as the competitors were not individuals who were seriously dedicated to athletics, the Organising Committee accepted the participation of workers, porters, etc., who were attracted by the monetary prizes of the Games. According to the press of the time, many comical incidents took place during the games: for instance, a policeman, who was assigned to watch over the crowds, left his post and participated in the races. Even a beggar, who pretended to be blind, participated in the races.

The Committee of the Wenlock Olympian Class, brainchild of the English doctor and surgeon William Penny Brookes, sent £10 to Athens for a prize for the best runner in the longest race at the Olympic Games. The Wenlock Prize was the largest prize on offer and was won by Petros Velissarios of Smyrna from the Ottoman Empire who was ethnically Greek.

=== Games of 1870 ===
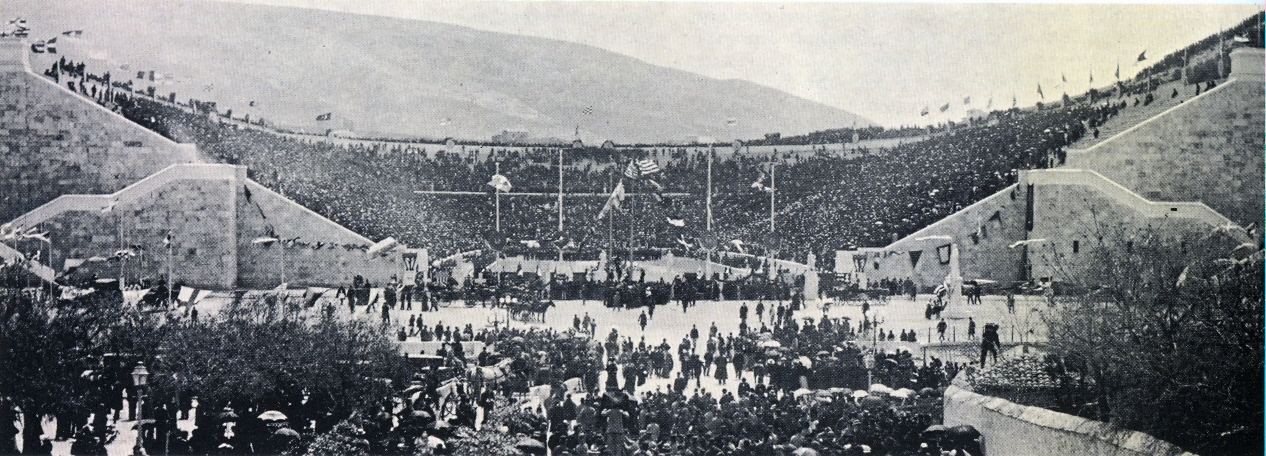
Panathenaic Stadium at the first day of the 1896 Olympics.

Evangelis Zappas planned to sponsor future Olympic Games and restore the Olympiad, but he died in 1865; however, he left a vast fortune, both for the construction of permanent facilities in the Greek capital, as well as for the continuation of the Olympic Games in four-year intervals. In July 1869, the dates of the 1870 Olympics were announced, followed by organizational plans and proposals about which events to include. The committee paid for participating athletes to undergo three months of training prior to the Games. This training took place in the Panathenaic Stadium, which had been cleaned and leveled.

The Games of 1870 took place in the Panathenaic stadium, which was excavated, restored and provided with wooden benches in order to accommodate 30,000 people, a huge number for the time. In general the contest was much better organized and athletes were uniformly dressed, with sport costumes and sandals in skin color. On November 1, the Games were officially opened, but athletic events were postponed to November 15 due to bad weather, which also forced the cancellation of all nautical events, horse races and shooting events. Athletes included Greek nationals, as well as ethnic Greeks from the Ottoman Empire and Crete (then a semi-independent state under Ottoman suzerainty). Some 20,000 to 25,000 spectators watched the 31 athletes who had previously qualified compete in a variety of events. Before the competition started, the athletes were ordered to take an oath that they would compete in a fair manner. At the same time, the Games included a competition in the arts.

As in 1859 winners received a cash prize; in addition, the first three winners received olive wreaths and small branches of olive and laurel. There was a band playing an Olympic Hymn, specially composed for the occasion. The judges were professors of the University of Athens, and there was a herald for announcing the winners. King George I was awarding the prizes to the winners at the sound of the music.

The 1870 Games were an enormous success and the press dedicated triumphant articles both to the excellent organization and to the accomplishments of the Games.

=== Games of 1875 ===
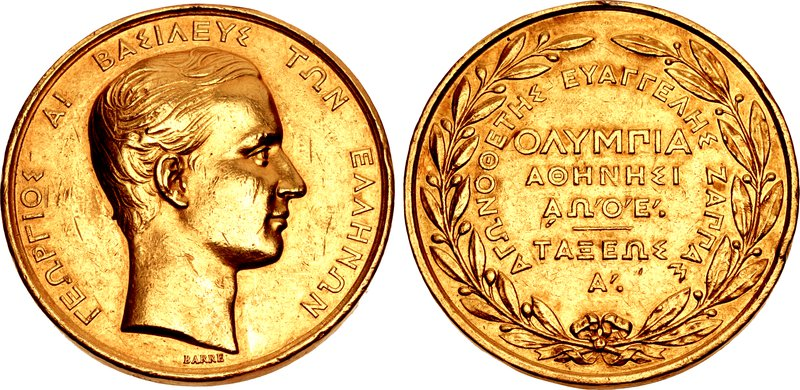
Gold medal for the 1875 Olympics

Planning for the 1875 competition began in 1871, and in 1873, the foundation for the Zappeion was laid. The 3rd Olympiad was organized by the Director of the Public Gymnasium, Ioannis Fokianos. Fokianos strongly believed that the ideal of gymnastics would expand from above, i.e. the upper classes, through the educated and cultured classes. For that reason, he excluded all participants except for university students. All these students were trained in the Public Gymnasium in Athens in a series of gymnastic exercises introduced by Fokianos and inspired from the German system of gymnastics.

The athletes were impressively dressed: white trousers and white shirts with a large blue stripe, which was, until 1896, the official uniform for gymnastics.

These contests were timed to coincide with an exposition of 1,200 Greek and 72 foreign exhibitors, the largest Greece had ever seen. The Greek royal family did not attend. There was not enough space for huge crowds that attended, who finally filled up the arena of the Stadium. Dissatisfaction ensued, and Fokianos was considered responsible despite his great efforts and the very good training of the athletes. The press heavily criticized the Games not only for the lack of organization, but also because the organizers had disqualified the working classes from competing. Fokianos became so embittered that he resigned as overall leader of the Olympics. However, the artistic competition of the Olympics proved a great success: 25 composers won awards in music and 25 sculptors and painters were honored.

=== Games of 1888–89 ===
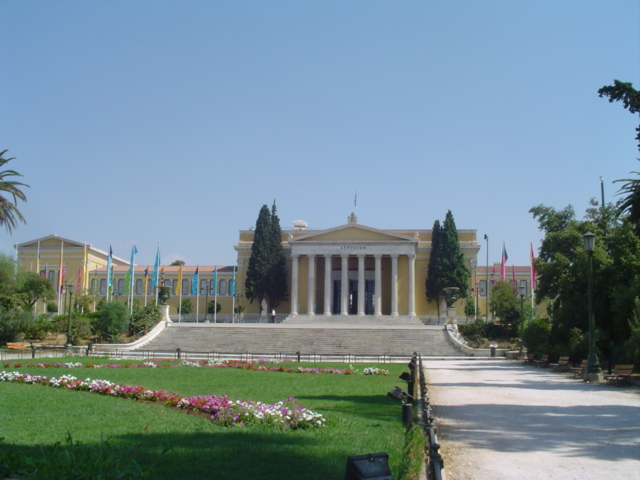
Front view of the landmark Zappeion exhibition center which is a short walk from the Panathenaic stadium.

After an extended period of litigation between the Greek government and a group of Zappas' relatives over Zappas' bequests, Konstantinos Zappas secured the execution of Zappas' will. The Greek government used Zappas' money to complete the Gymnasterion, a central gym, in 1878, and to continue the work on the Zappeion exhibition center, which had begun in 1873 and was frequently interrupted. The Zappeion officially opened on October 20, 1888. As in 1875, Fokianos took charge of the sporting events (but did so independently of the earlier Olympic Committee), which were postponed up till April 30, 1889. These Games were not co-ordinated by the Olympic Committee that organised the 1859, 1870, and 1875 Zappas Games, but by Fokianos alone. Thirty athletes competed in a variety of disciplines including discus, pole long leap (over a ditch), weightlifting, mast climbing, and rope climbing among others. All participants were clad alike.

In 1890, a royal decree, signed by Crown Prince Constantine and the foreign minister Stephanos Dragoumis, announced that the Olympiad would be reinstated, at four-year intervals, from 1888. The next Olympics were officially scheduled for 1892, but ended postponed due to the Greek government's claim of lack of funding. In the event, the Panathenaic stadium would be used to stage the Olympic Games in 1896, the first to be held under the auspices of the International Olympic Committee.

== Aftermath and influence on the rebirth of the Olympics ==
The English physician William Penny Brookes had initiated a sports movement in the United Kingdom, founding the Wenlock Olympian Games in 1850. These were organised by the Wenlock Olympian Class which changed its name to the Wenlock Olympian Society in 1860. Brookes adopted an event from the programme of the 1859 Zappas Games and included 'throwing the javelin at a target' into the much-expanded 1861 Wenlock Olympian Games. The first man to be placed on the honor roll of the Wenlock Olympian Society was the Smyrniot Petros Velissariou, who competed at the 1859 Athens Olympic Games in distance running and who won a prize donated by the Wenlock Olympian Society's Committee. Brookes was the first to propose holding open international Olympics to be held in Athens, as distinct from the revived Greek national Olympics of 1859, 1870, and 1875 which mirrored the Ancient Olympics as they were closed to all but Greek-speaking competitors. Despite his persistent pleas to the Greek government for action on this issue, his proposals fell on deaf ears. However, many of the ideas that Brookes used within the Wenlock Olympian Games were subsequently adopted by Baron Pierre de Coubertin, who learned about them when visiting Wenlock in 1890.

Zappas' influence on the revival of the Olympic Games, alongside Soutsos, Brookes, and later Coubertin, was significant. In addition, the Panathenaic stadium, which was refurbished with his funding, went on to host events in the 1896, 1906, and 2004 IOC Olympics, while the Zappeion hosted fencing events in 1896, was a site of the first Olympic Village in 1906 (hosting the Hungarian Olympic team), and was used as the media center during the 2004 Athens Olympic Games.

== Sources ==
- Brownell, Susan (2008). The 1904 Anthropology Days and Olympic Games: Sport, Race, and American Imperialism. Nebraska Press. ISBN 978-0-8032-1098-1.
- Findling, John E.; Pelle, Kimberly D. (2004). Encyclopedia of the Modern Olympic Movement. Greenwood Publishing Group. ISBN 978-0-313-32278-5.
- Gerlach, Larry R. (2004). The Winter Olympics: From Chamonix to Salt Lake. University of Utah Press. ISBN 0-87480-778-6.
- Golden, Mark (2008). Greek Sport and Social Status. University of Texas Press. ISBN 978-0-292-71869-2.
- Hill, Christopher R. (1992). Olympic Politics. Manchester University Press ND. ISBN 0-7190-3792-1.
- Landry, Fernand; Landry, Marc; Yerlès, Magdeleine (1991). Sport: The Third Millennium: International Symposium. Presses Université Laval. ISBN 2-7637-7267-6.
- Matthews, George R. (1904). America's First Olympics: The St. Louis Games of 1904. University of Missouri Press. ISBN 0-8262-1588-2.
- Young, David C. (1996). The Modern Olympics: A Struggle for Revival. Johns Hopkins University Press. ISBN 0-8018-5374-5.
- Young, David C. (2004). A Brief History of the Olympic Games. Blackwell Publishing. ISBN 1-4051-1130-5.

Preceded by Ancient Olympic Games	Zappas Olympics (1859, 1870, 1875, 1888–1889)	Succeeded by Summer Olympics; Athens
