= Petros Zappas =

Greek politician

Petros Zappas (Greek: Πέτρος Ζάππας) was an entrepreneur and politician and a member of the Zappas family of national benefactors originally from Labovë of Greek or Aromanian descent. This village would later form part of the short-lived Autonomous Republic of Northern Epirus. In World War I, during Greek administration between October 1914 and September 1916, Petros Zappas was elected as member of the Greek Parliament for the Argyrokastron Prefecture (1915–1917) in the December 1915 elections.

== See also ==
- Evangelos Zappas
- Konstantinos Zappas
