= Apostol Meksi =

Albanian doctor and intellectual involved in the Albanian National Awakening

Apostol Meksi was an Albanian doctor, folklorist and patriot. He was among the first intellectuals involved in the Albanian National Awakening that sought independence from the Ottoman Empire, and among the first who studied Albanian folklore.

== Life ==
Apostol Meksi was born in 1825 in Labovë e Madhe. His father Jorgji came from a family known in the area for its intellectual activities. Apostol Meksi studied at Zosimea, where he met Konstandin Kristoforidhi. Together they shared a great interest in Albanian folklore, including traditional tales, songs and dances. During their time in Ioannina, they taught Albanian to Johann Georg von Hahn, and gave him valuable Albanian folk materials.
