= Konstantinos Zappas =

Greek philanthropist (1814–1892)

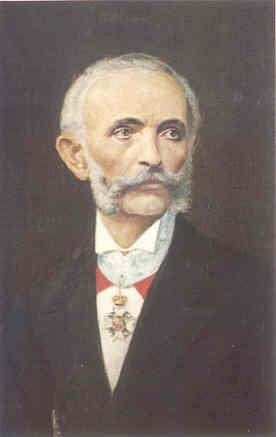
Portrait of Konstantinos Zappas

Konstantinos Zappas (Greek: Κωνσταντίνος Ζάππας; 1814–1892) was a Greek entrepreneur and national benefactor who together with his cousin, Evangelos Zappas, played an essential role in the revival of the Olympic Games.

== Biography ==
Zappas was born in 1814 in the village of Labova e Madhe, between Gjirokastër and Tepelenë (modern Albania), then in the Ottoman Empire. He was of Greek, Aromanian or Albanian descent. After the death of Evangelos Zappas, he became the executor of his cousin's legacy and the ongoing revival of the Olympic Games. He was appointed manager of the Olympic Committee that organised the so-called Zappas Olympics, a Greek athletic festival held in 1859, 1870 and 1875 and the forerunner of the modern international Olympics.

In 1881, after the annexation of Thessaly to Greece, he bought extended estates there and the following years contributed to the building of the Zappeion building in Athens, which was officially opened on 28 October 1888. A number of Greek schools and educational facilities were built with his personal financial support including the female schools in Constantinople, in his hometown Labovë, as well as in a number of towns in Epirus (Tepelene, Delvine) and Thessaly. Many students benefited from his scholarship for post-graduate studies in Western Europe (mostly in the scientific field of agriculture). Zappas supported an Albanian-Greek union and thought that Greece could help the Albanian cause. He believed that the Albanians and Greeks were of a common Pelasgian origin and spoke related languages.

Zappas died in 1892 in Mantes-la-Jolie, France. After his death, the Romanian government seized all of his assets and capital that were still in Romania causing a noted international law case at that time; his cousin, Evangelis Zappas, was often incorrectly cited as his brother. There was also land and money in Greece that Konstantinos left to the Greek government. Baron Pierre de Coubertin together with A. Mercatis, a close friend of Konstantinos, encouraged the Greek government to put in some of that legacy to fund the 1896 Athens Olympic Games in addition to the legacy of Evangelis Zappas.

The statues of Konstantinos and his cousin Evangelis Zappas are situated in front of the Zappeion.
