= Ioannis Kossos =

Greek sculptor (1822–1875)

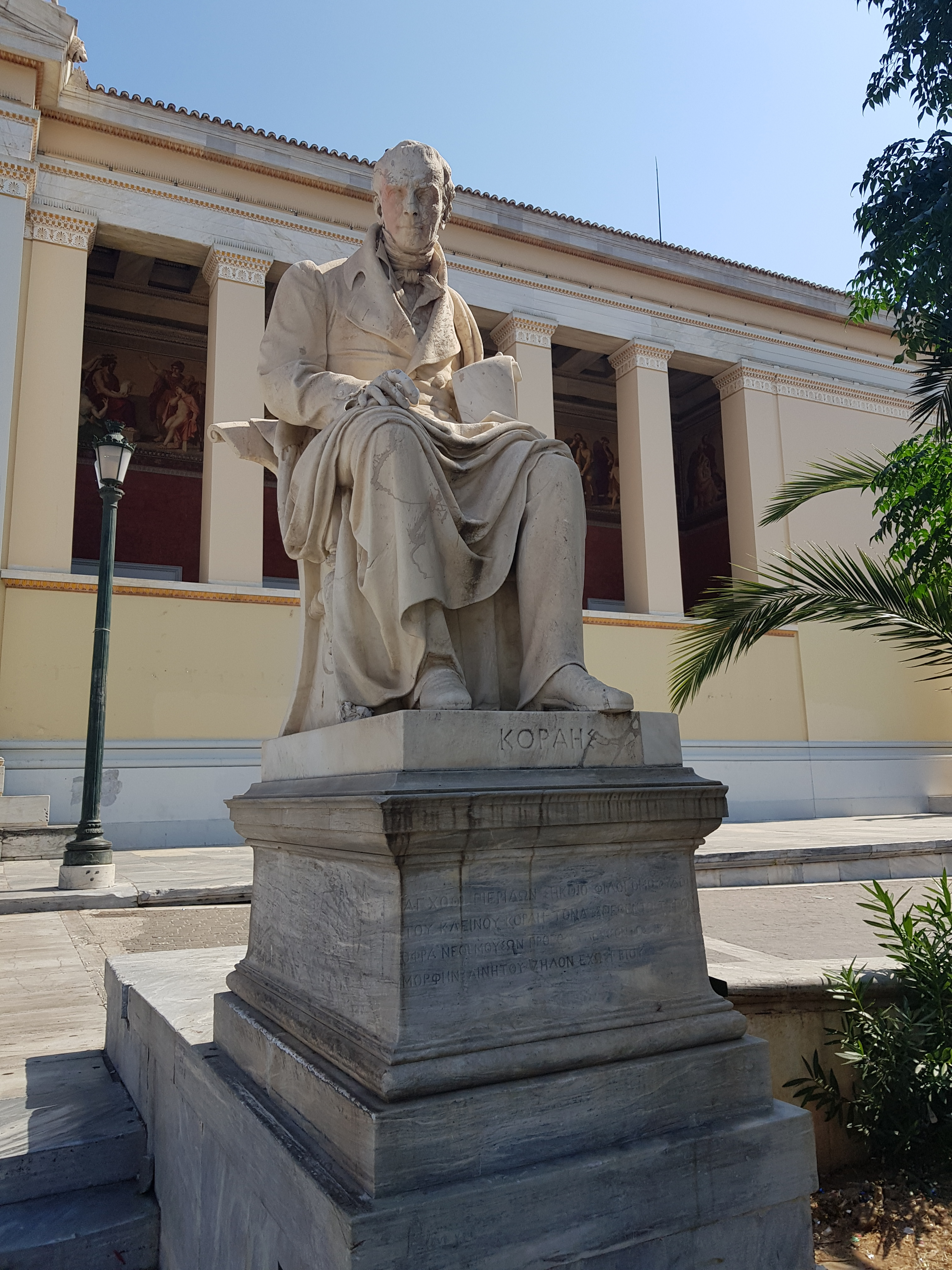
- Adamantios Korais
- Born: 1822; Tripoli
- Died: 1875 (aged 52–53); Athens

Ioannis Kossos (Greek: Ιωάννης Κόσσος; 1822–1875) was a Greek sculptor of the 19th century. Born in Tripoli, he later studied in Athens and Florence. His work includes several statues and busts in Athens, Patras and other Greek cities.

Kossos died in Athens.

== Gallery ==
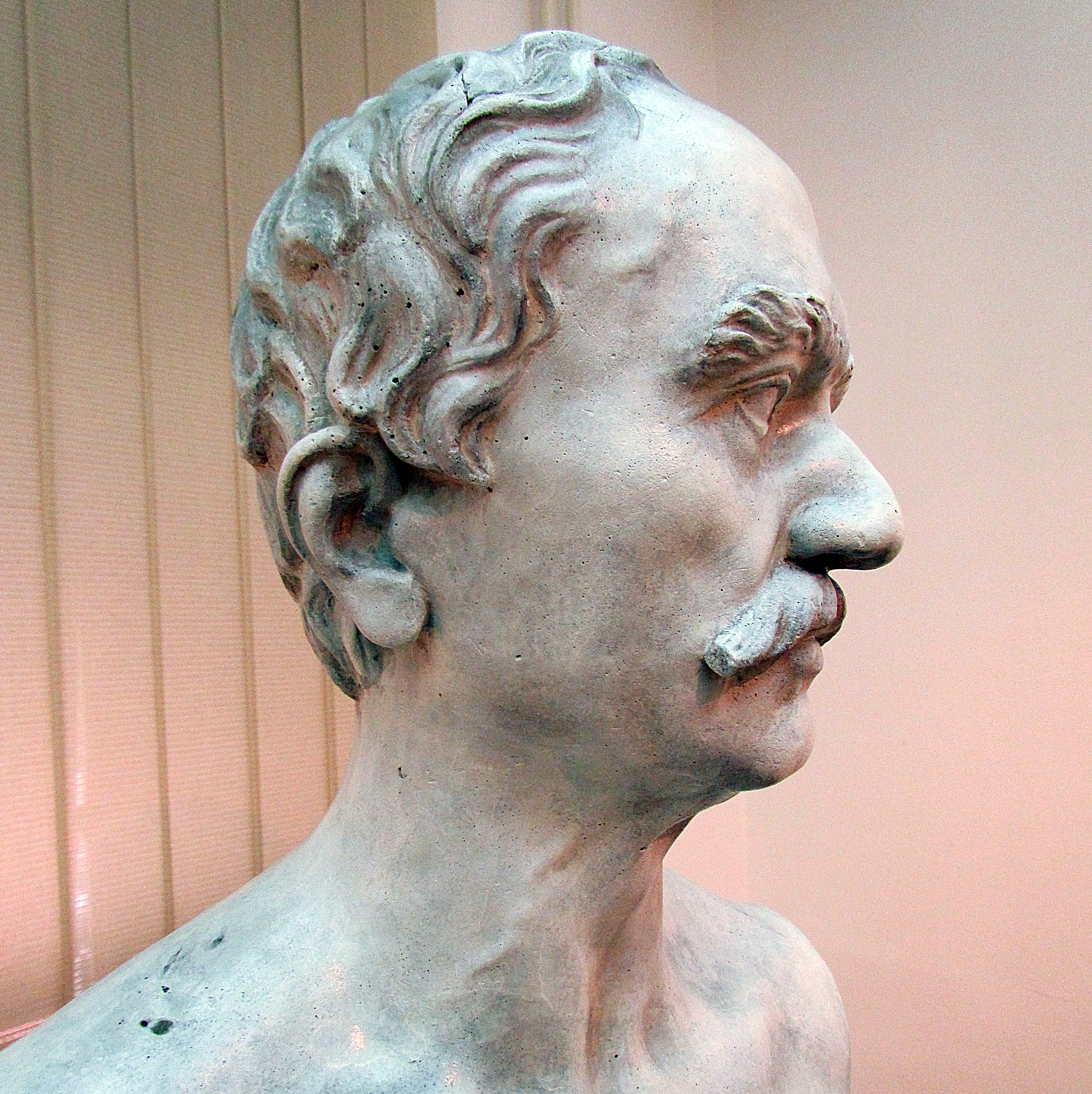
Bust of Milos Obrenovic

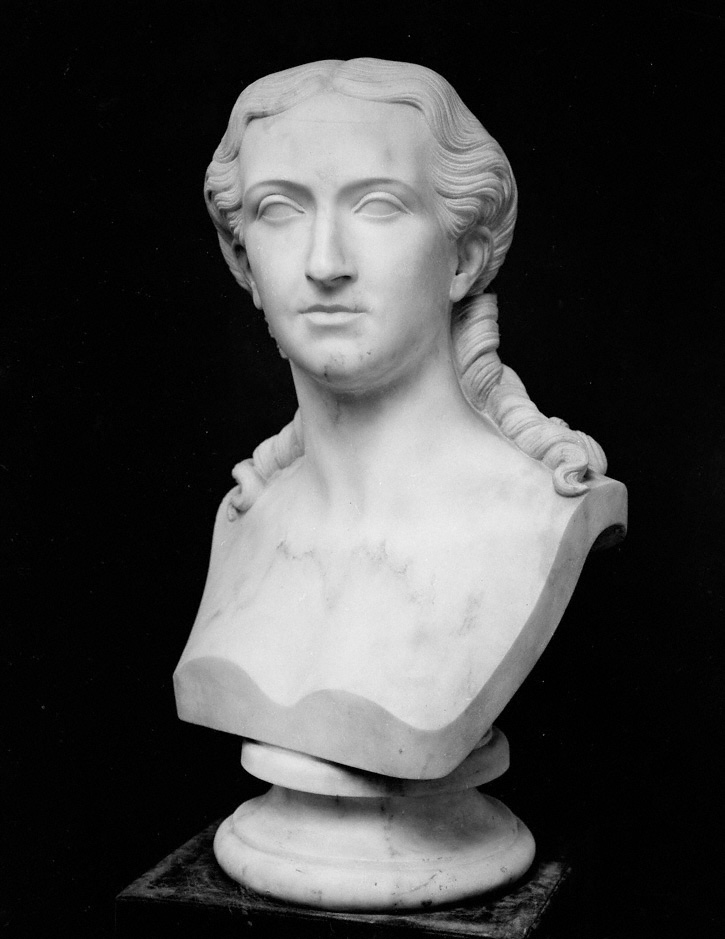
Bust of Adelais Ristori

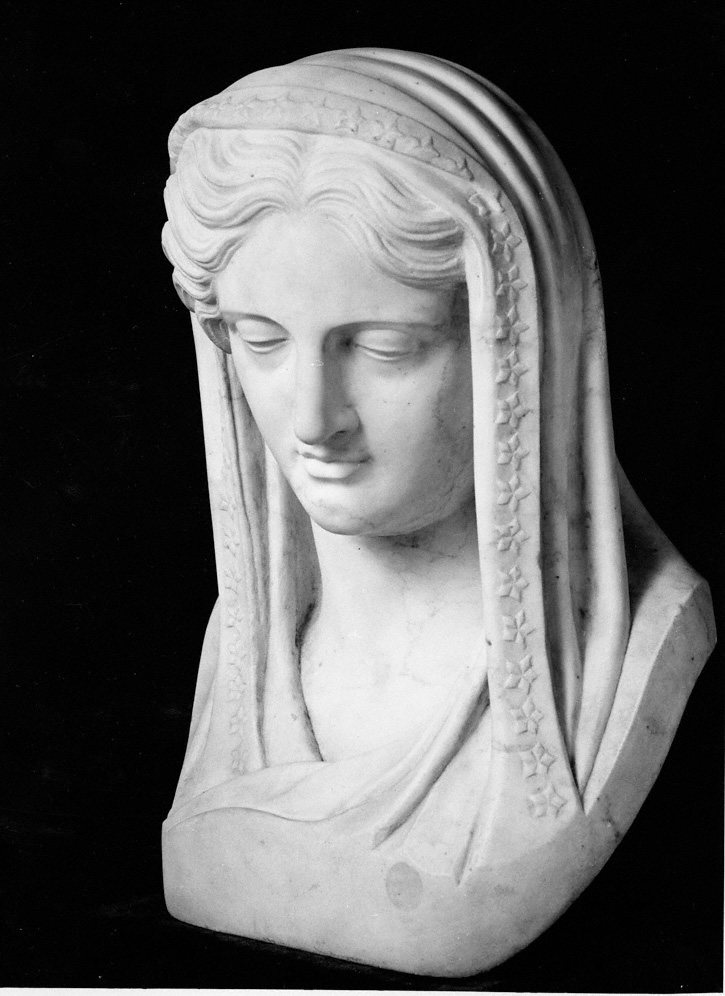
The Night

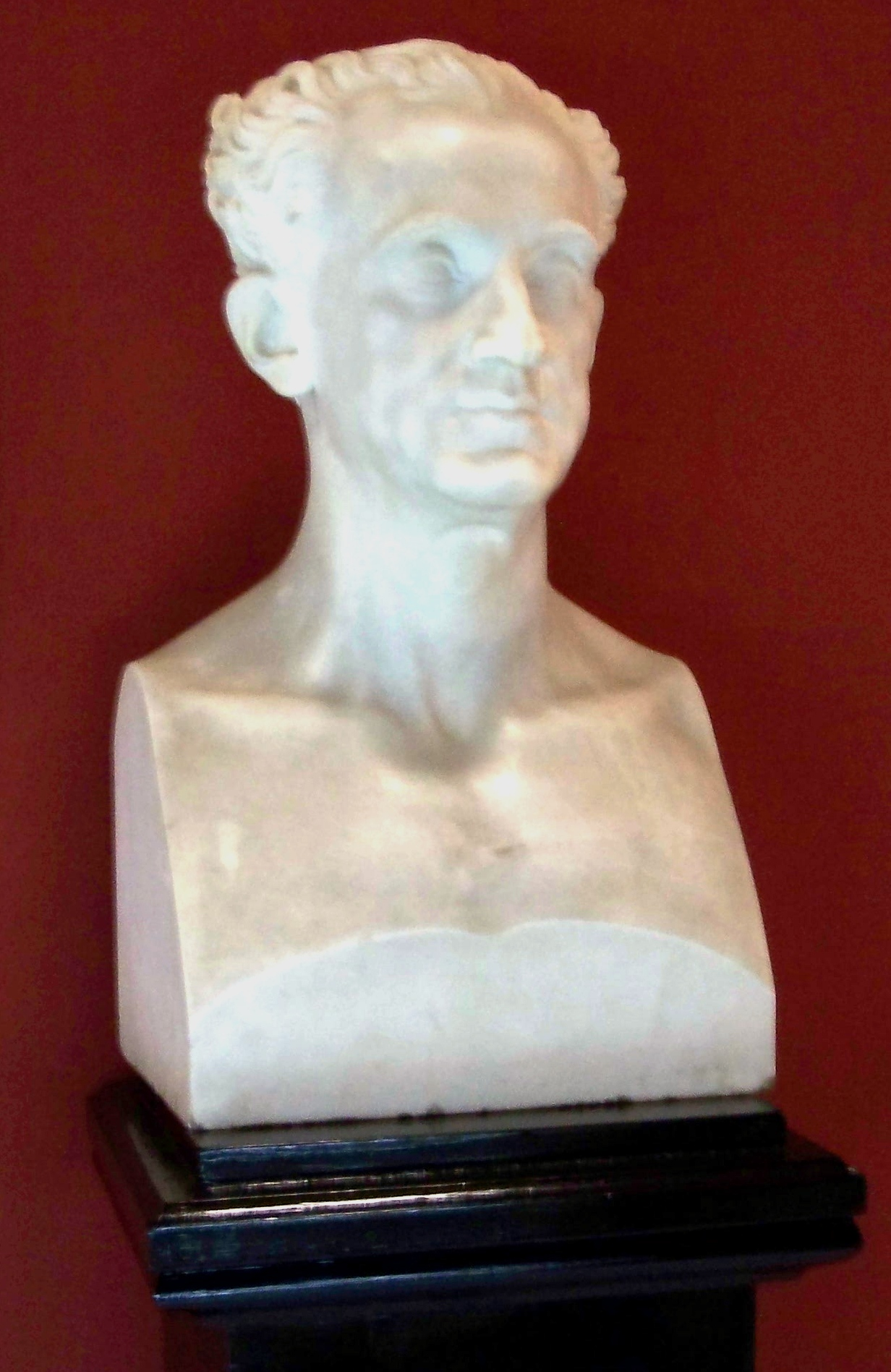
Ioannis Kapodistrias

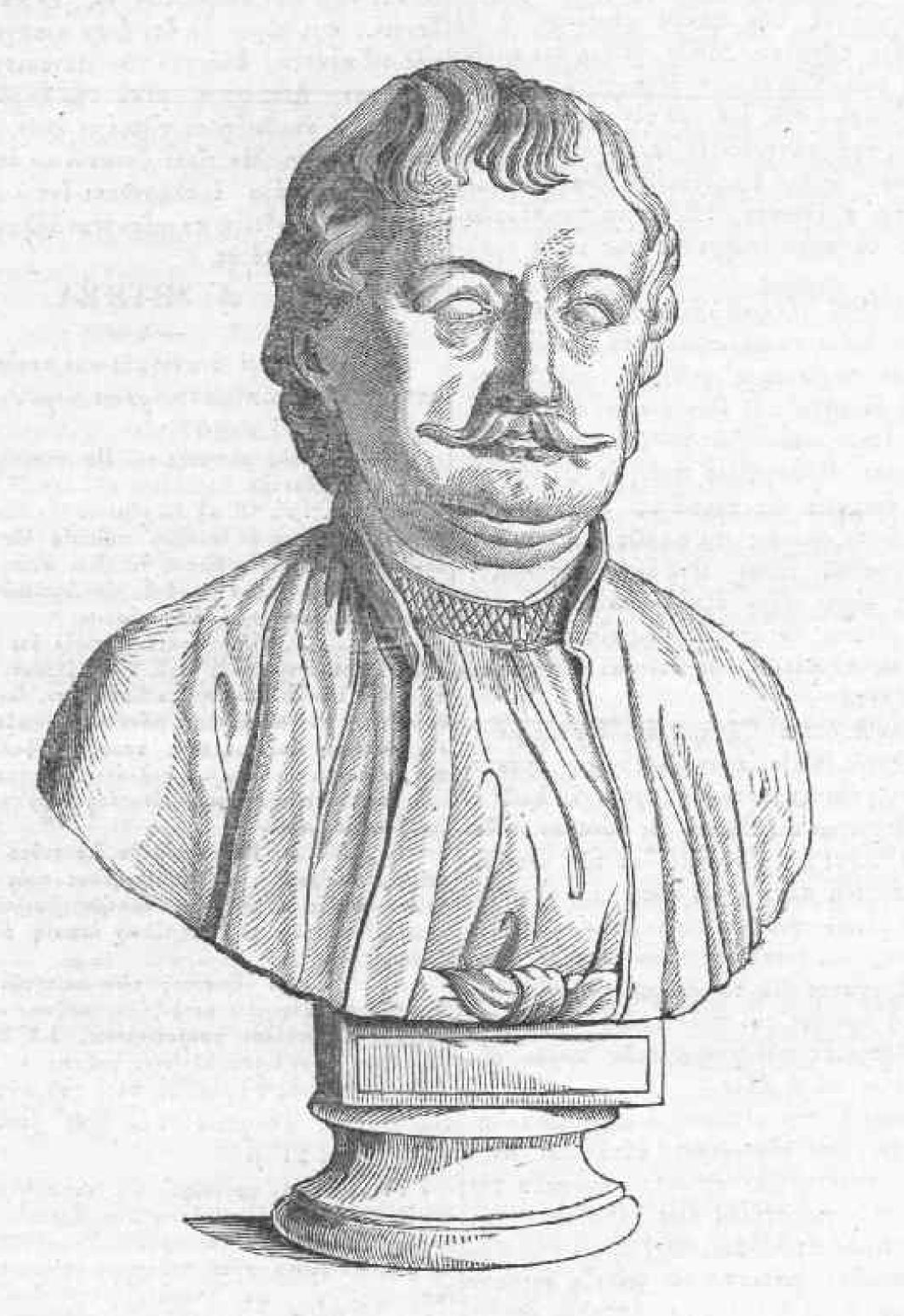
Rigas Ferraios

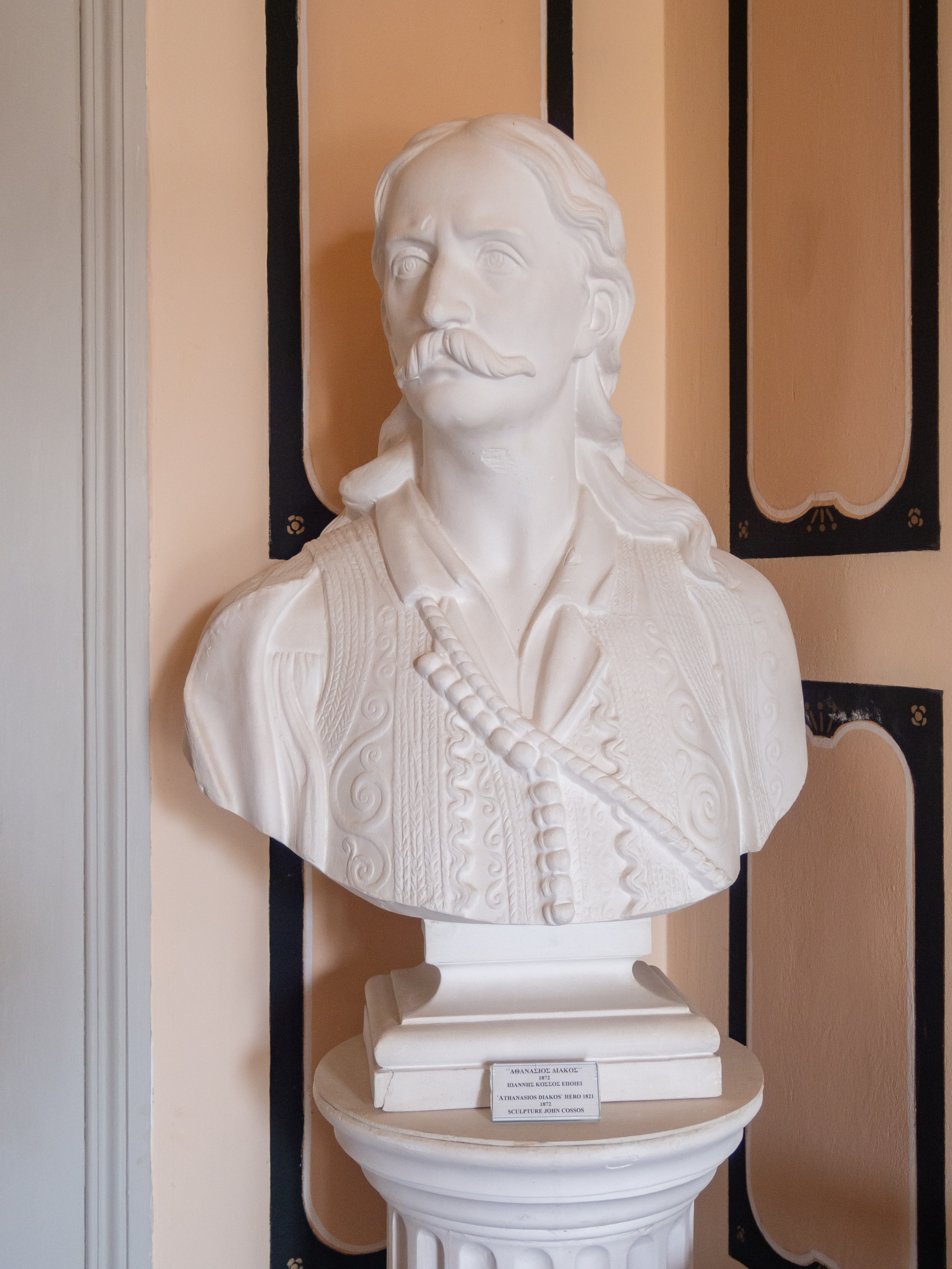
Bust of Athanasios Diakos (1872)

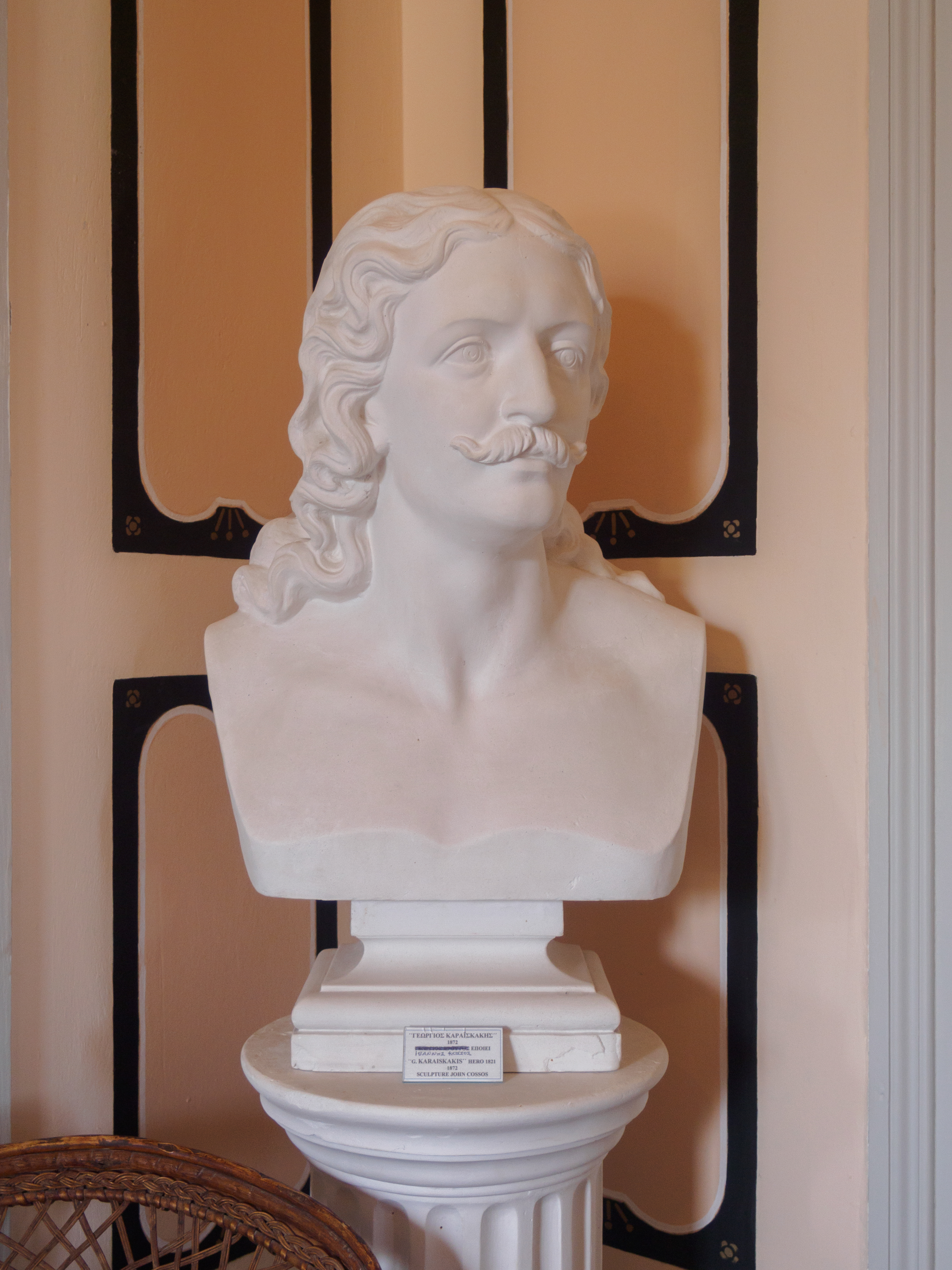
Bust of Georgios Karaiskakis (1872)

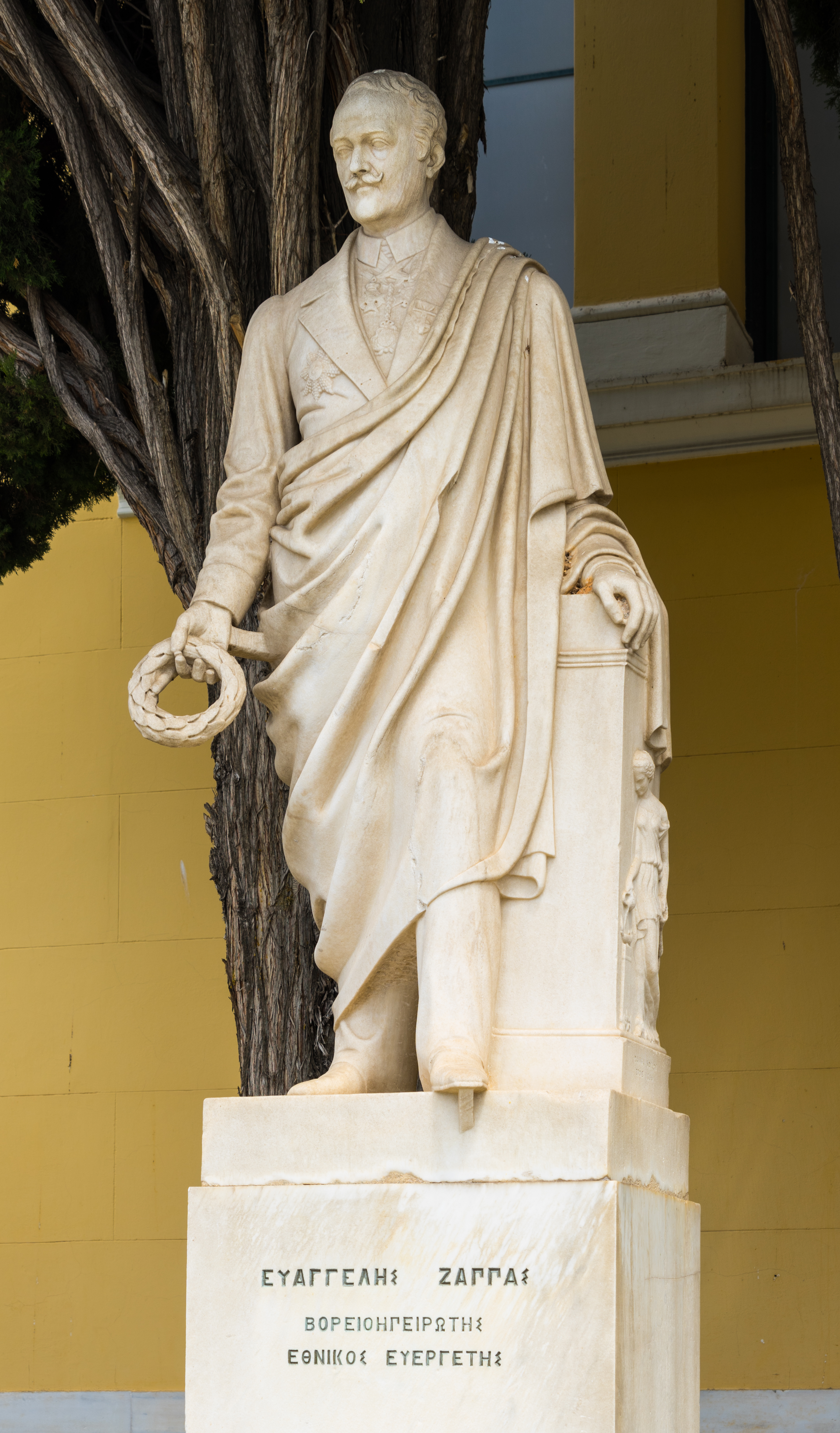
Evangelos Zappas

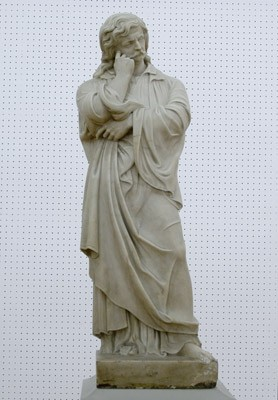
Rigas Feraios 1867

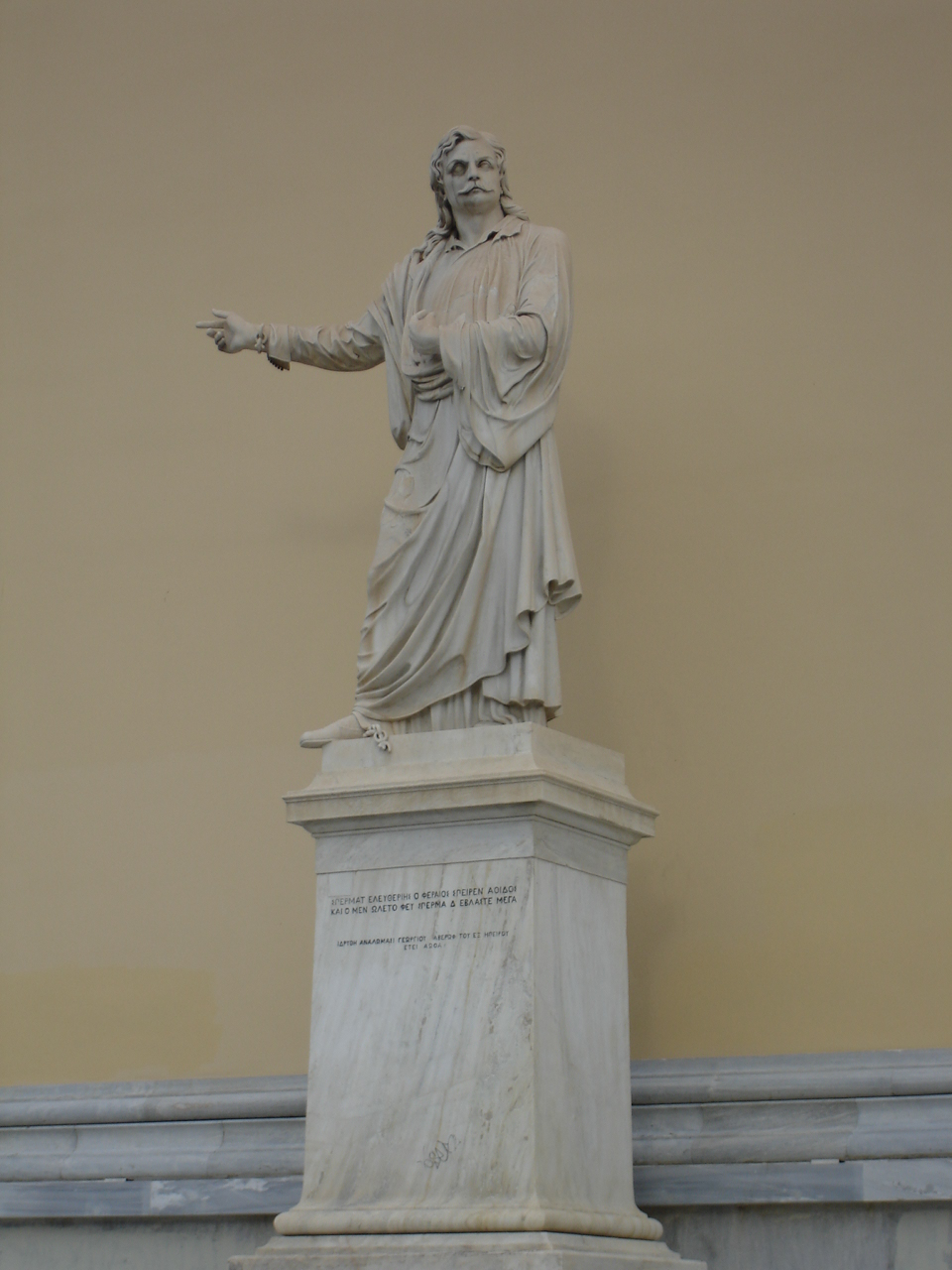
Rigas Feraios

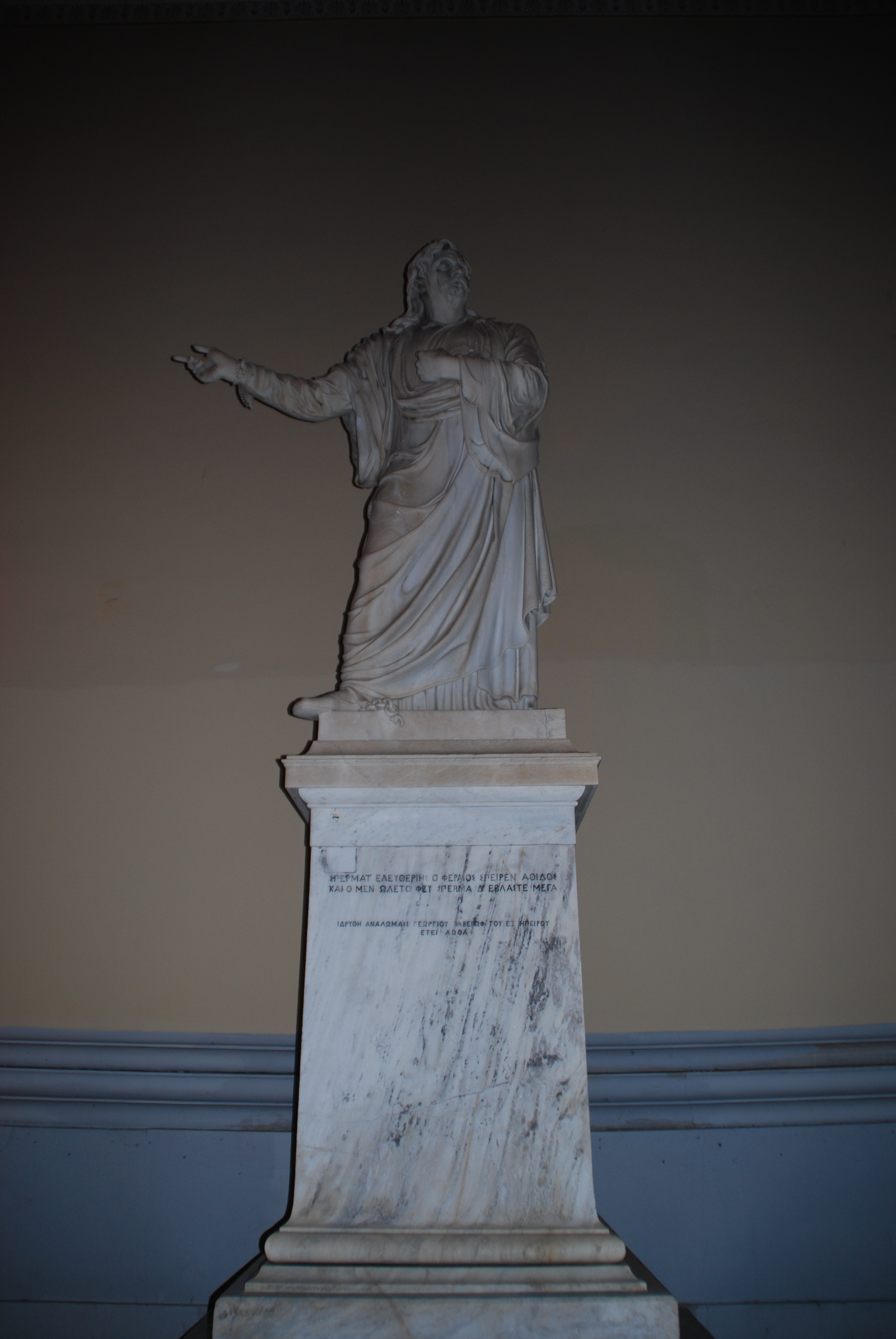
Rigas Feraios

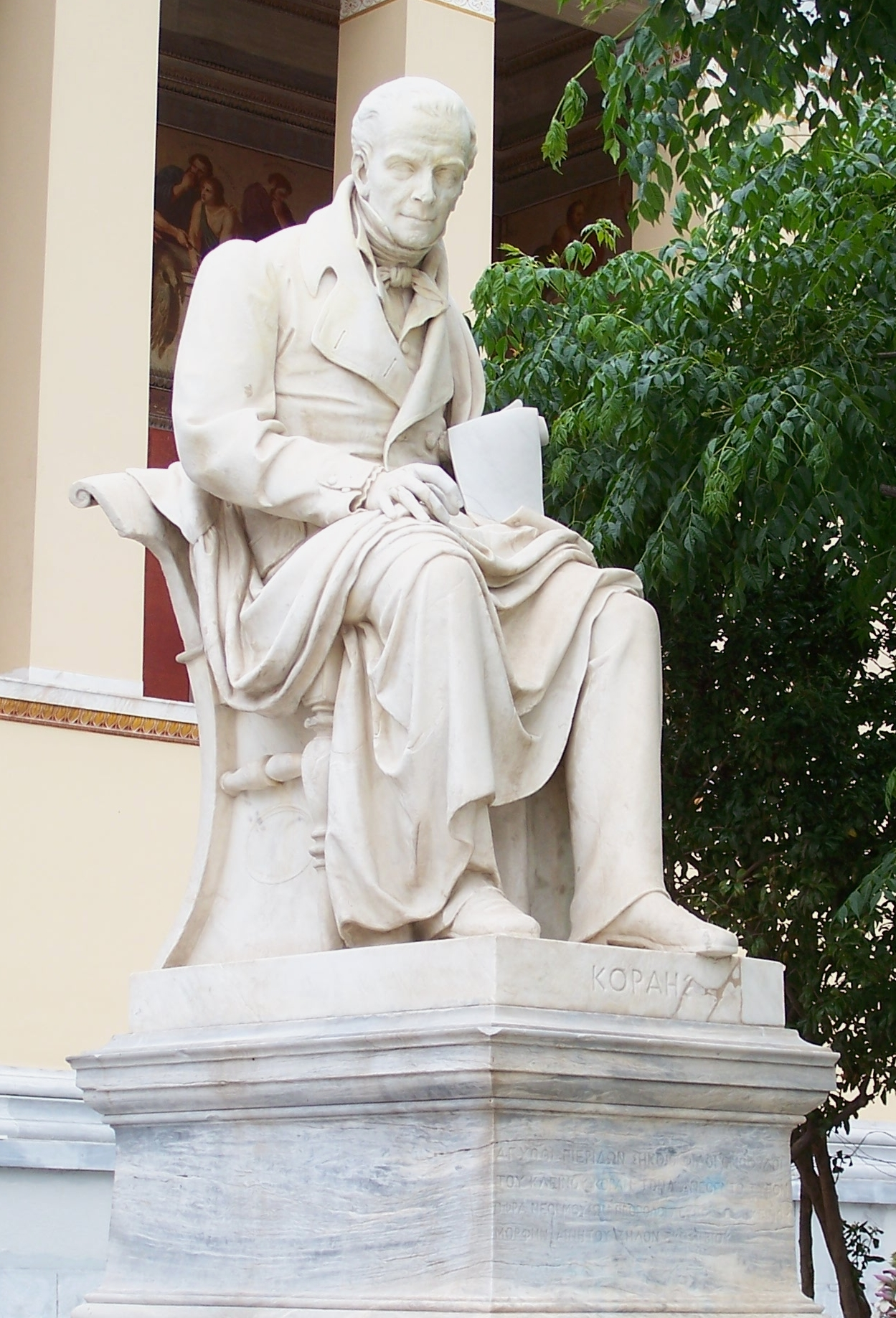
Statue of Adamantios Korais
