= Greece at the 1896 Summer Olympics =

- IOC code: GRE
- NOC: Committee of the Olympic Games

in Athens, Greece April 6, 1896 – April 15, 1896
- Competitors: 169 in 9 sports and 39 events
- Medals Ranked 2nd: Gold 10 Silver 18 Bronze 19 Total 47

Summer Olympics appearances (overview)
- 1896; 1900; 1904; 1908; 1912; 1920; 1924; 1928; 1932; 1936; 1948; 1952; 1956; 1960; 1964; 1968; 1972; 1976; 1980; 1984; 1988; 1992; 1996; 2000; 2004; 2008; 2012; 2016; 2020; 2024

Other related appearances
- 1906 Intercalated Games

Greece was the host nation of the 1896 Summer Olympics held in Athens. The number of Greek contestants is commonly cited as 169, but as many as 176 Greeks contested events in all nine sports. The Greeks were by far the most successful nation in terms of total medals with 47, 27 more than the United States of America. Nevertheless, their number of first-place finishes (10) was one fewer than the Americans' 11. The Greeks had 172 entries in 39 events. Only 4 events had no Greek entrants—the 400 metres and the high jump in athletics and the vault and the team horizontal bar in gymnastics.

== Medalists ==
The following competitors won medals at the games. In the discipline sections below, the medalists' names are bolded.

Medal	Name	Sport	Event	Date
Gold	Spyridon Louis	Athletics	Men's marathon	April 10
Gold	Aristidis Konstantinidis	Cycling	Men's road race	April 12
Gold	Leonidas Pyrgos	Fencing	Men's masters foil	April 7
Gold	Ioannis Georgiadis	Fencing	Men's sabre	April 9
Gold	Ioannis Mitropoulos	Gymnastics	Men's rings	April 9
Gold	Nikolaos Andriakopoulos	Gymnastics	Men's rope climbing	April 10
Gold	Pantelis Karasevdas	Shooting	Men's 200 m military rifle	April 9
Gold	Georgios Orphanidis	Shooting	Men's 300 m free rifle, three positions	April 12
Gold	Ioannis Frangoudis	Shooting	Men's 25 m rapid fire pistol	April 11
Gold	Ioannis Malokinis	Swimming	Men's sailors 100 m freestyle	April 11
Silver	Charilaos Vasilakos	Athletics	Men's marathon	April 10
Silver	Miltiadis Gouskos	Athletics	Men's shot put	April 7
Silver	Panagiotis Paraskevopoulos	Athletics	Men's discus throw	April 6
Silver	Stamatios Nikolopoulos	Cycling	Men's sprint	April 11
Silver	Stamatios Nikolopoulos	Cycling	Men's time trial	April 11
Silver	Georgios Kolettis	Cycling	Men's 100 km	April 8
Silver	Tilemachos Karakalos	Fencing	Men's sabre	April 9
Silver	Nikolaos Andriakopoulos; Spyridon Athanasopoulos; Petros Persakis; Thomas Xenakis	Gymnastics	Men's team parallel bars	April 9
Silver	Thomas Xenakis	Gymnastics	Men's rope climbing	April 10
Silver	Pavlos Pavlidis	Shooting	Men's 200 m military rifle	April 9
Silver	Ioannis Frangoudis	Shooting	Men's 300 m free rifle, three positions	April 12
Silver	Georgios Orphanidis	Shooting	Men's 25 m rapid fire pistol	April 11
Silver	Antonios Pepanos	Swimming	Men's 500 m freestyle	April 11
Silver	Ioannis Andreou	Swimming	Men's 1200 m freestyle	April 11
Silver	Spyridon Chazapis	Swimming	Men's sailors 100 m freestyle	April 11
Silver	Dionysios Kasdaglis	Tennis	Men's singles	April 11
Silver	Dionysios Kasdaglis; Demetrios Petrokokkinos	Tennis	Men's doubles	April 11
Silver	Georgios Tsitas	Wrestling	Men's Greco-Roman	April 11
Bronze	Dimitrios Golemis	Athletics	Men's 800 m	April 9
Bronze	Evangelos Damaskos	Athletics	Men's pole vault	April 10
Bronze	Ioannis Theodoropoulos	Athletics	Men's pole vault	April 10
Bronze	Ioannis Persakis	Athletics	Men's triple jump	April 6
Bronze	Georgios Papasideris	Athletics	Men's shot put	April 7
Bronze	Sotirios Versis	Athletics	Men's discus throw	April 6
Bronze	Periklis Pierrakos-Mavromichalis	Fencing	Men's foil	April 7
Bronze	Athanasios Vouros	Fencing	Men's foil	April 7
Bronze	Ioannis Chrysafis; Filippos Karvelas; Dimitrios Loundras; Ioannis Mitropoulos	Gymnastics	Men's team parallel bars	April 9
Bronze	Petros Persakis	Gymnastics	Men's rings	April 9
Bronze	Nikolaos Trikoupis	Shooting	Men's 200 m military rifle	April 9
Bronze	Nikolaos Morakis	Shooting	Men's 25 m military pistol	April 10
Bronze	Ioannis Frangoudis	Shooting	Men's 30 m free pistol	April 11
Bronze	Efstathios Chorafas	Swimming	Men's 500 m freestyle	April 11
Bronze	Dimitrios Drivas	Swimming	Men's sailors 100 m freestyle	April 11
Bronze	Konstantinos Paspatis	Tennis	Men's singles	April 10
Bronze	Alexandros Nikolopoulos	Weightlifting	Men's one hand lift	April 7
Bronze	Sotirios Versis	Weightlifting	Men's two hand lift	April 7
Bronze	Stephanos Christopoulos	Wrestling	Men's Greco-Roman	April 11

Medals by sport
Sport	1st place, gold medalist(s)	2nd place, silver medalist(s)	3rd place, bronze medalist(s)	Total
Shooting	3	3	3	**9**
Gymnastics	2	2	2	**6**
Fencing	2	1	2	**6**
Athletics	1	3	6	**10**
Swimming	1	3	2	**6**
Cycling	1	3	0	**4**
Tennis	0	2	1	**3**
Wrestling	0	1	1	**2**
Weightlifting	0	0	2	**2**
Total	10	18	19	47

=== Multiple medalists ===
The following competitors won multiple medals at the 1896 Olympic Games.

Name	Medal	Sport	Event
Ioannis Frangoudis	Gold; Silver; Bronze	Shooting	Men's 25 metre rapid fire pistol Men's 300 metre free rifle Men's 30 metre pistol
Nikolaos Andriakopoulos	Gold; Silver	Gymnastics	Men's rope climbing Men's team parallel bars
Georgios Orphanidis	Gold; Silver	Shooting	Men's 300 metre free rifle Men's 25 metre rapid fire pistol
Ioannis Mitropoulos	Gold; Bronze	Gymnastics	Men's rings Men's team parallel bars
Dimitrios Kasdaglis	Silver; Silver	Tennis	Men's singles Men's doubles
Stamatios Nikolopoulos	Silver; Silver	Cycling	Men's sprint Men's track time trial
Thomas Xenakis	Silver; Silver	Gymnastics	Men's team parallel bars Men's rope climbing
Petros Persakis	Silver; Bronze	Gymnastics	Men's team parallel bars Men's rings
Sotirios Versis	Bronze; Bronze	Athletics; Weightlifting	Men's discus throw Men's two hand lift

== Competitors ==
The following is the list of number of competitors in the Games.

Sport	Men	Women	Total
Athletics	29	0	29
Cycling	8	0	8
Fencing	9	0	9
Gymnastics	56	0	56
Shooting	48	0	48
Swimming	16	0	16
Tennis	7	0	7
Weightlifting	3	0	3
Wrestling	2	0	2
Total	178	0	178

Medals by day
Day	Date	1st place, gold medalist(s)	2nd place, silver medalist(s)	3rd place, bronze medalist(s)	Total
1	6 April	0	1	2	3
2	7 April	1	1	5	7
3	8 April	0	1	0	1
4	9 April	3	3	4	10
5	10 April	2	2	5	9
6	11 April	3	9	3	15
7	12 April	2	1	0	3
8	13 April	0	0	0	0
Total		10	18	19	47

== Athletics ==
The Greeks entered every event on the athletics program save the 400 metres and the high jump. They took 1 gold, 3 silver, and 6 bronze medals in the sport. It was initially thought that the Greek team had swept the top three places of the marathon event, until it was discovered that Spiridon Belokas had covered part of the distance by cart and was disqualified.

Track & road events

Athlete	Event	Heat		Final	
Athlete	Event	Time	Rank	Time	Rank
Alexandros Chalkokondylis	100 m	12.8	2 Q	12.6	5
Georgios Gennimatas	100 m	Unknown	4-5	Did not advance	
Konstantinos Mouratis	100 m	DNS		Did not advance	
Konstantinos Mouratis	400 m	DNS		Did not advance	
Angelos Fetsis	800 m	Unknown	4	Did not advance	
Dimitrios Golemis	800 m	2:16.8	2 Q	2:28.0	3rd place, bronze medalist(s)
Dimitrios Tombrof	800 m	Unknown	5	Did not advance	
Angelos Fetsis	1500 m	—N/a		Unknown	5
Dimitrios Golemis	1500 m	—N/a		Unknown	6
Konstantinos Karakatsanis	1500 m	—N/a		Unknown	7-8
Dimitrios Tombrof	1500 m	—N/a		Unknown	7-8
Anastasios Andreou	110 m hurdles	Unknown	4	Did not advance	
Konstantinos Mouratis	110 m hurdles	DNS		Did not advence	
Athanasios Skaltsogiannis	110 m hurdles	Unknown	3-4	Did not advance	
Spyridon Belokas	Marathon	—N/a		DSQ	
Dimitrios Deligiannis	Marathon	—N/a		DNF	
Evangelos Gerakeris	Marathon	—N/a		Unknown	7
Georgios Grigoriou	Marathon	—N/a		DNF	
Ilias Kafetzis	Marathon	—N/a		DNF	
Sokratis Lagoudakis	Marathon	—N/a		Unknown	9
Ioannis Lavrentis	Marathon	—N/a		DNF	
Spyridon Louis	Marathon	—N/a		2:58:50 OR	1st place, gold medalist(s)
Stamatios Masouris	Marathon	—N/a		Unknown	8
Eleftherios Papasymeon	Marathon	—N/a		Unknown	5
Charilaos Vasilakos	Marathon	—N/a		3:06:03	2nd place, silver medalist(s)
Ioannis Vrettos	Marathon	—N/a		Unknown	4

Field events

Athlete	Event	Final	
Athlete	Event	Distance	Position
Evangelos Damaskos	Men's pole vault	2.60	3rd place, bronze medalist(s)
Ioannis Theodoropoulos	Men's pole vault	2.60	3rd place, bronze medalist(s)
Vasilios Xydas	Men's pole vault	2.40	5
Alexandros Chalkokondylis	Men's long jump	5.74	4
Athanasios Skaltsogiannis	Men's long jump	Unknown	5-9
Konstantinos Mouratis	Men's long jump	DNS	
Ioannis Persakis	Men's triple jump	12.52	3rd place, bronze medalist(s)
Christos Zoumis	Men's triple jump	Unknown	6-7
Miltiadis Gouskos	Men's shot put	11.20	2nd place, silver medalist(s)
Georgios Papasideris	Men's shot put	10.36	3rd place, bronze medalist(s)
Georgios Papasideris	Men's discus throw	Unknown	5-9
Panagiotis Paraskevopoulos	Men's discus throw	28.95	2nd place, silver medalist(s)
Sotirios Versis	Men's discus throw	27.28	3rd place, bronze medalist(s)

== Cycling ==
Greece had entries in all six cycling events, winning one and taking second place in three more.

=== Track ===
Athlete	Event	Time / Distance	Rank
Stamatios Nikolopoulos	Men's time trial	25.4	2nd place, silver medalist(s)
Stamatios Nikolopoulos	Men's sprint	5:00.2	2nd place, silver medalist(s)
Georgios Koletis	10 km	DNF	
Aristidis Konstantinidis	10 km	Unknown	
Georgios Aspiotis	100 km	DNS	
Georgios Koletis	100 km	Unknown	2nd place, silver medalist(s)
Aristidis Konstantinidis	100 km	DNF	
Nikos Loverdos	12 hour race	DNF	
Konstantinos Konstantinou	12 hour race	DNF	
Georgios Paraskevopoulos	12 hour race	DNF	
A. Tryfiatis-Tripiaris	12 hour race	DNF	

=== Road ===
Athlete	Event	Time	Rank
Georgios Aspiotis	Men's road race	Unknown	4-7
Miltiades Iatrou	Men's road race	Unknown	4-7
Aristidis Konstantinidis	Men's road race	3:22:31	1st place, gold medalist(s)
Konstantinos Konstantinou	Men's road race	Unknown	4-7
Georgios Paraskevopoulos	Men's road race	Unknown	4-7

== Fencing ==
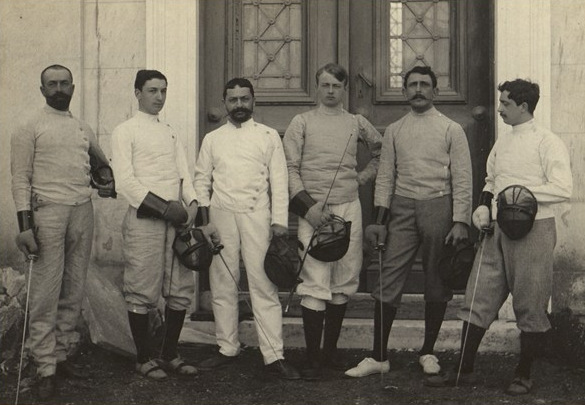
Group of French and Greek fencers at 1896 Summer Olympics

Greek fencers won the top two places in the sabre competition, third place in the amateur foil competition, and in a major upset, Pyrgos defeated Joanni Perronet in the sole match of the masters foil event.

Athlete	Event	Round 1			Final	
Athlete	Event	MW	ML	Rank	Opposition Score	Rank
Georgios Valakakis	Men's foil	0	3	4	Did not advance	7
Konstantinos Miliotis-Komninos	Men's foil	1	2	3	Did not advance	6
Periklis Pierrakos-Mavromichalis	Men's foil	2	1	2	Did not advance	3rd place, bronze medalist(s)
Ioannis Poulos	Men's foil	0	3	4	Did not advance	8
Athanasios Vouros	Men's foil	2	1	2	Did not advance	3rd place, bronze medalist(s)
Leonidas Pyrgos	Men's masters foil	—N/a			Perronet (FRA); W 3–1	1st place, gold medalist(s)
Ioannis Georgiadis	Men's sabre	4	0	1	—N/a	1st place, gold medalist(s)
Georgios Iatridis	Men's sabre	0	4	5	—N/a	5
Tilemachos Karakalos	Men's sabre	3	1	2	—N/a	2nd place, silver medalist(s)

== Gymnastics ==
The names of the members of the two teams that competed in the team events are, for the most part, unknown. The vault and the team horizontal bar were two of the four events (the other two in the athletics program) that had no Greek entrants. The Greeks took two of each color medal, with two medals in each of the rope climbing (gold and silver), rings (gold and bronze), and team parallel bars (silver and bronze) competitions.

Team

Athlete	Event	Result	Rank
Nikolaos Andriakopoulos; Spyridon Athanasopoulos; Petros Persakis; Thomas Xenakis; 29 others, names unknown	Men's team parallel bars	Unknown	2nd place, silver medalist(s)
Ioannis Chrysafis; Ioannis Mitropoulos; Dimitrios Loundras; Filippos Karvelas; 15 others, names unknown	Men's team parallel bars	Unknown	3rd place, bronze medalist(s)

Individual

Athlete	Event	Result	Rank
Aristovoulos Petmezas	Men's pommel horse	Unknown	3-15
Ioannis Mitropoulos	Men's rings	Unknown	1st place, gold medalist(s)
Petros Persakis	Men's rings	Unknown	3rd place, bronze medalist(s)
Antonios Papaioannou	Men's horizontal bar	Unknown	3-15
Leonidas Tsiklitiras	Men's horizontal bar	Unknown	3-15
Filippos Karvelas	Men's parallel bars	Unknown	3-18
Ioannis Mitropoulos	Men's parallel bars	Unknown	3-18
Antonios Papaioannou	Men's parallel bars	Unknown	3-18
Nikolaos Andriakopoulos	Men's rope climbing	14.0	1st place, gold medalist(s)
Thomas Xenakis	Men's rope climbing	14.0	2nd place, silver medalist(s)

== Shooting ==
Greek shooters dominated the two rifle events and the rapid fire pistol competition, but were largely unable to compete with the Paine brothers of the United States in the pistol events that the two brothers entered.

Athlete	Event	Final	
Athlete	Event	Score	Rank
Georgios Diamantis	Men's 200 m military rifle	1456	7
Alexios Fetsios	Men's 200 m military rifle	894	11
G. Karagiannopoulos	Men's 200 m military rifle	Unknown	14-41
Pantelis Karasevdas	Men's 200 m military rifle	2350	1st place, gold medalist(s)
Anastasios Metaxas	Men's 200 m military rifle	1701	4
Georgios Orphanidis	Men's 200 m military rifle	1698	5
Panagiotis Pavlidis	Men's 200 m military rifle	1978	2nd place, silver medalist(s)
Aristovoulos Petmezas	Men's 200 m military rifle	Unknown	14-41
Spiridon Stais	Men's 200 m military rifle	845	12
Ioannis Theofilakis	Men's 200 m military rifle	1261	9
Nikolaos Trikoupis	Men's 200 m military rifle	1713	3rd place, bronze medalist(s)
22 others, names unknown	Men's 200 m military rifle	Unknown	14-41
Antelothanasis	Men's 300 m free rifle	Unknown	6-18
Georgios Diamantis	Men's 300 m free rifle	Unknown	6-18
Alexios Fetsios	Men's 300 m free rifle	Unknown	6-18
Ioannis Frangoudis	Men's 300 m free rifle	1312	2nd place, silver medalist(s)
Hatzidakis	Men's 300 m free rifle	Unknown	6-18
Karakatsanis	Men's 300 m free rifle	Unknown	6-18
Pantelis Karasevdas	Men's 300 m free rifle	1039	5
Leon Langakis	Men's 300 m free rifle	DNF	
Nikolaos Levidis	Men's 300 m free rifle	Unknown	6-18
Anastasios Metaxas	Men's 300 m free rifle	1102	4
Xenon Mikhailidis	Men's 300 m free rifle	Unknown	6-18
Moustakopoulos	Men's 300 m free rifle	Unknown	6-18
Georgios Orphanidis	Men's 300 m free rifle	1583	1st place, gold medalist(s)
Panagiotis Pavlidis	Men's 300 m free rifle	Unknown	6-18
Alexandros Theofilakis	Men's 300 m free rifle	Unknown	6-18
Ioannis Theofilakis	Men's 300 m free rifle	Unknown	6-18
Nikolaos Trikoupis	Men's 300 m free rifle	Unknown	6-18
Ioannis Vourakis	Men's 300 m free rifle	DNF	
Pantelis Karasevdas	Men's 25 m military pistol	DNF	
Xenon Mikhailidis	Men's 25 m military pistol	Unknown	6-13
Nikolaos Morakis	Men's 25 m military pistol	205	3rd place, bronze medalist(s)
Georgios Orphanidis	Men's 25 m military pistol	Unknown	6-13
Pantazidis	Men's 25 m military pistol	Unknown	6-13
Patsouris	Men's 25 m military pistol	Unknown	6-13
Panagiotis Pavlidis	Men's 25 m military pistol	Unknown	6-13
Aristovoulos Petmezas	Men's 25 m military pistol	Unknown	6-13
Ioannis Frangoudis	Men's 25 m military pistol	Unknown	4
Platis	Men's 25 m military pistol	Unknown	6-13
Sanidis	Men's 25 m military pistol	DNF	
Vavis	Men's 25 m military pistol	Unknown	6-13
Ioannis Frangoudis	Men's 25 m rapid fire pistol	344	1st place, gold medalist(s)
Georgios Orphanidis	Men's 25 m rapid fire pistol	249	2nd place, silver medalist(s)
Ioannis Frangoudis	Men's 30 m pistol	Unknown	3rd place, bronze medalist(s)
Nikolaos Morakis	Men's 30 m pistol	Unknown	4
Georgios Orphanidis	Men's 30 m pistol	Unknown	5

== Swimming ==
Some of the Greek swimmers' names were not recorded. Greece's only swimming gold medal came in an event in which only Greek swimmers were allowed to compete, as did a silver and a bronze. In the three open events, the Greeks took two silvers and one bronze, all in the two longer races.

Athlete	Event	Final	
Athlete	Event	Time	Rank
Georgios Anninos	100 m freestyle	Unknown	3-10
Efstathios Chorafas	100 m freestyle	Unknown	3-10
Alexandros Chrysafos	100 m freestyle	Unknown	3-10
Ag. Diamantopoulos	100 m freestyle	DNS	
I. Dontis	100 m freestyle	DNS	
Dimitris Frangopoulos	100 m freestyle	DNS	
Georgios Gaitanos	100 m freestyle	DNS	
G. K. Karagiannis	100 m freestyle	DNS	
Nikolaos Katravas	100 m freestyle	DNS	
V. Khatzis	100 m freestyle	DNS	
Theod. Kontos	100 m freestyle	DNS	
P. F. Koukoudakis	100 m freestyle	DNS	
Georgios Lamprakis	100 m freestyle	DNS	
Sav. Laskaridis	100 m freestyle	DNS	
Merk. Lerias	100 m freestyle	DNS	
V. Mangourakis	100 m freestyle	DNS	
I. Markou	100 m freestyle	DNS	
G. Marnezos	100 m freestyle	DNS	
Panagiotis Nastos	100 m freestyle	DNS	
Georgios Petrou	100 m freestyle	DNS	
Fill. Pothitos	100 m freestyle	DNS	
Emm. Valetsiotis	100 m freestyle	DNS	
Ir. Vlachos	100 m freestyle	DNS	
Sol. Xenopoulos	100 m freestyle	DNS	
Four others, names unknown	100 m freestyle	Unknown	3-10
Efstathios Chorafas	500 m freestyle	Unknown	3rd place, bronze medalist(s)
Dimitrios Christopoulos	500 m freestyle	DNS	
Ag. Diamantopoulos	500 m freestyle	DNS	
I. Dontis	500 m freestyle	DNS	
Dimitris Frangopoulos	500 m freestyle	DNS	
Georgios Gaitanos	500 m freestyle	DNS	
I. Georgiadis	500 m freestyle	DNS	
A. Grigoriadis	500 m freestyle	DNS	
Nikolaos Katravas	500 m freestyle	DNS	
V. Khatzis	500 m freestyle	DNS	
Theod. Kontos	500 m freestyle	DNS	
Nik. Kourakos	500 m freestyle	DNS	
K. Kourkoulas	500 m freestyle	DNS	
Sav. Laskaridis	500 m freestyle	DNS	
Merk. Lerias	500 m freestyle	DNS	
V. Mangourakis	500 m freestyle	DNS	
I. Markou	500 m freestyle	DNS	
G. Marnezos	500 m freestyle	DNS	
G. Mazoukas	500 m freestyle	DNS	
P. Mikhalopoulos	500 m freestyle	DNS	
Panagiotis Nastos	500 m freestyle	DNS	
Antonios Pepanos	500 m freestyle	9:57.6	2nd place, silver medalist(s)
Fill. Pothitos	500 m freestyle	DNS	
K. Salouros	500 m freestyle	DNS	
D. Santanis	500 m freestyle	DNS	
N. Stournaras	500 m freestyle	DNS	
Sol. Xenopoulos	500 m freestyle	DNS	
A. Zanos	500 m freestyle	DNS	
Ioannis Andreou	1200 m freestyle	21:03.4	2nd place, silver medalist(s)
G. Athanasiou	1200 m freestyle	DNS	
Efstathios Chorafas	1200 m freestyle	DNS	
Ag. Diamantopoulos	1200 m freestyle	DNS	
I. Dontis	1200 m freestyle	DNS	
Dimitris Frangopoulos	1200 m freestyle	DNS	
Nikolaos Katravas	1200 m freestyle	Unknown	3-8
V. Khatzis	1200 m freestyle	DNS	
Theod. Kontos	1200 m freestyle	DNS	
Nik. Kourakos	1200 m freestyle	DNS	
P. F. Koukoudakis	1200 m freestyle	DNS	
Sav. Laskaridis	1200 m freestyle	DNS	
Merk. Lerias	1200 m freestyle	DNS	
Panagiotis Nastos	1200 m freestyle	DNS	
Antonios Pepanos	1200 m freestyle	DNS	
A. Romantzas	1200 m freestyle	DNS	
Emm. Valetsiotis	1200 m freestyle	DNS	
Sol. Xenopoulos	1200 m freestyle	DNS	
Three others, names unknown	1200 m freestyle	Unknown	3-8
Spyridon Chazapis	Sailors 100 m freestyle	Unknown	2nd place, silver medalist(s)
Dimitrios Drivas	Sailors 100 m freestyle	Unknown	3rd place, bronze medalist(s)
Nik. Kourakos	Sailors 100 m freestyle	DNS	
K. Kourkoulas	Sailors 100 m freestyle	DNS	
Ioannis Malokinis	Sailors 100 m freestyle	2:20.4	1st place, gold medalist(s)
P. Mikhalopoulos	Sailors 100 m freestyle	DNS	
K. Salouros	Sailors 100 m freestyle	DNS	
D. Santanis	Sailors 100 m freestyle	DNS	
N. Stournaras	Sailors 100 m freestyle	DNS	

== Tennis ==
Greece earned a silver medal and a bronze medal in the singles tournament. Kasdaglis and Petrokokkinos won a silver medal in doubles tournament.

Athlete	Event	First round	Quarterfinals	Semifinals	Final	
Athlete	Event	Opposition Score	Opposition Score	Opposition Score	Opposition Score	Rank
Aristidis Akratopoulos	Singles	Flack (AUS); W	Paspatis (GRE); L	Did not advance		
Konstantinos Akratopoulos	Singles	Bye	Kasdaglis (GRE); L	Did not advance		
Dimitris Frangopoulos	Singles	Tapavica (HUN); L	Did not advance			
Dimitrios Kasdaglis	Singles	J. Defert (FRA); W	Akratopoulos (GRE); W	Tapavica (HUN); W	Boland (GBR); L 3–6, 1-6	2nd place, silver medalist(s)
Konstantinos Paspatis	Singles	Robertson (GBR); W	Akratopoulos (GRE); W	Boland (GBR); L	Did not advance	3rd place, bronze medalist(s)
Demetrios Petrokokkinos	Singles	Rallis (GRE); L	Did not advance			
Evangelos Rallis	Singles	Petrokokkinos (GRE); W	Boland (GBR); L	Did not advance		
Dimitrios Kasdaglis / Demetrios Petrokokkinos (GRE)	Doubles	—N/a	Paspatis / Rallis (GRE) W	Flack (AUS) / Robertson (GBR) W	Boland (GBR) / Traun (GER) L 7–5, 4–6, 1-6	2nd place, silver medalist(s)
Aristidis Akratopoulos / Konstantinos Akratopoulos (GRE)	Doubles	—N/a	Boland (GBR) / Traun (GER) L	Did not advance		
Konstantinos Paspatis / Evangelos Rallis (GRE)	Doubles	—N/a	Kasdaglis / Petrokokkinos (GRE) L	Did not advance		

== Weightlifting ==
In the one handed event, weightlifters had to lift with each hand successively. Nikolopoulos was able to list 57 kilograms with one hand, but only 40 kilograms with the other. He was judged to have come in third place in the event between the silver medallist Viggo Jensen who had lifted 57 with each hand and 4th-place finisher Versis who had lifted 40 with each, but had not been able to lift 57 with either.

Lifting form was used to break ties in the two handed competition.

Athlete	Event	Result	Rank
Alexandros Nikolopoulos	Men's one hand lift	57.0	3rd place, bronze medalist(s)
Sotirios Versis	Men's one hand lift	40.0	4
Georgios Papasideris	Men's two hand lift	90.0	=4
Sotirios Versis	Men's two hand lift	90.0	3rd place, bronze medalist(s)

== Wrestling ==
Christopoulos won a battle of endurance against Momcsilló Tapavicza in the quarterfinals of the wrestling tournament. He then had to face Tsitas, who had received a bye in that round. Tsitas won after Christopoulos retired due to a shoulder injury; Christopoulous received the bronze medal. Tsitas then faced Carl Schuhmann in the final. Schuhmann, having had a bye in the semifinals, took 55 minutes over two days to defeat Tsitas, the match having to be postponed on account of darkness after 40 minutes on the first day.

Athlete	Event	Quarterfinal	Semifinal	Final	
Athlete	Event	Opposition Result	Opposition Result	Opposition Result	Rank
Stephanos Christopoulos	Men's Greco-Roman	Tapavica (HUN); W	Tsitas (GRE); L	Did not advance	3rd place, bronze medalist(s)
Georgios Tsitas	Men's Greco-Roman	Bye	Christopoulos (GRE); W	Schuhmann (GER); L	2nd place, silver medalist(s)
