= Shooting at the 1896 Summer Olympics – Men's 200 metre military rifle =

Olympic shooting event

Men's military rifle at the Games of the I Olympiad
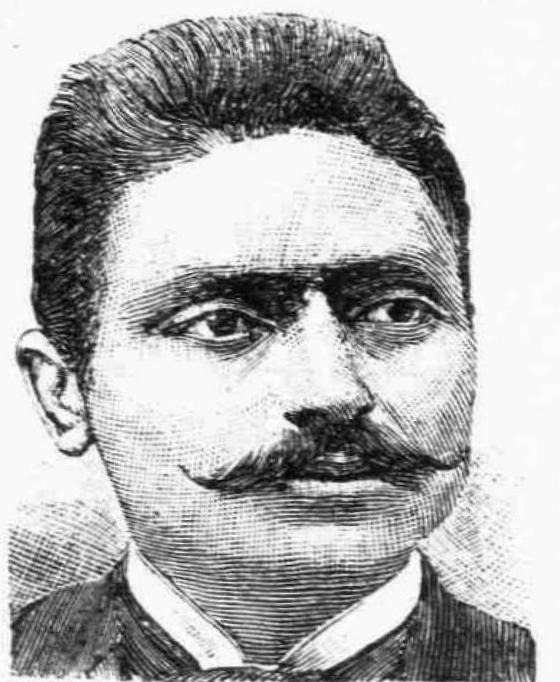
- Pantelis Karasevdas
- Venue: Kallithea shooting range
- Dates: April 8–9, 1896
- Competitors: 42 from 7 nations
- Winning score: 2350

Medalists
1st place, gold medalist(s)		Pantelis Karasevdas; Greece
2nd place, silver medalist(s)		Pavlos Pavlidis; Greece
3rd place, bronze medalist(s)		Nicolaos Trikupis; Greece

The men's 200 metre military rifle event was one of five sport shooting events on the Shooting at the 1896 Summer Olympics programme. It was held at a distance of 200 metres, on 8 April and 9 April, with each shooter firing half of his shots on the first day and half the second. Shooters fired four strings of ten shots each, for a total of 40 shots. 42 shooters, representing each of the seven nations that had shooters in Athens, competed.

When the competition finished in the morning of 9 April, Pantelis Karasevdas of Greece had hit the target all 40 times, amassing a score of 2,350 points. Panagiotis Pavlidis hit the target 38 times and came in second.

== Background ==
This was the only appearance of the 200 metre military rifle event. Military rifle categories would return in 1920 (a 300 metres (980 ft) three positions event) and 1924 (seven events at 300 and 600 metres (980 and 1,970 ft)). It was the first event held at the newly inaugurated Kallithea shooting range. A ceremonial first shot was fired by Olga Constantinovna of Russia, the queen consort of the Hellenes.

== Competition format ==
The competition had each shooter fire 40 shots, in 4 strings of 10, at a range of 200 metres. Scoring involved multiplying target hits by points scored in each string.

== Schedule ==
Date		Time	Round
Gregorian	Julian	Time	Round
Wednesday, 8 April 1896; Thursday, 9 April 1896	Wednesday, 27 March 1896; Thursday, 28 March 1896	10:30	Strings 1–2; Strings 3–4

== Results ==
Only partial results are known.

Rank	Shooter	Nation	Score	Hits	1	2	3	4
1st place, gold medalist(s)	Pantelis Karasevdas	Greece	2,350	40	480	Unknown		
2nd place, silver medalist(s)	Panagiotis Pavlidis	Greece	1,978	38	Unknown			
3rd place, bronze medalist(s)	Nicolaos Trikupis	Greece	1,713	34	Unknown			
4	Anastasios Metaxas	Greece	1,701	Unknown				
5	Georgios Orphanidis	Greece	1,698	Unknown				
6	Viggo Jensen	Denmark	1,640	30	Unknown			
7	Georgios Diamantis	Greece	1,456	Unknown		384	Unknown	
8	Albert Baumann	Switzerland	1,294	Unknown				
9	Ioannis Theofilakis	Greece	1,261	Unknown		312	Unknown	
10	Sidney Merlin	Great Britain	1,156	Unknown	477	Unknown		
11	Alexios Fetsios	Greece	894	Unknown		272	Unknown	
12	Eugen Schmidt	Denmark	845	12	Unknown			
12	Spiridon Stais	Greece	845	Unknown				
14–41	Charles Waldstein	United States	Unknown		354	154	Unknown	
14–41	Machonet	Great Britain	Unknown					
14–41	Giuseppe Rivabella	Italy	Unknown					
14–41	Aristovoulos Petmezas	Greece	Unknown					
14–41	Albin Lermusiaux	France	Unknown					
14–41	G. Karagiannopoulos	Greece	Unknown					
14–41	22 others, names unknown	Greece	Unknown					
—	Holger Nielsen	Denmark	Retired after two strings		Unknown		Did not finish	
