= Swimming at the 1896 Summer Olympics – Men's 1200 metre freestyle =

Men's 1200 metre freestyle at the Games of the I Olympiad
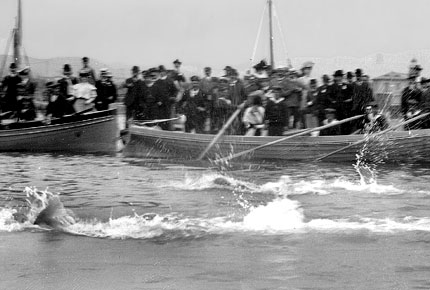
- Swimming at the 1896 Summer Olympics
- Venue: Bay of Zea
- Date: April 11
- Competitors: 9 from 4 nations
- Winning time: 18:22.2

Medalists
1st place, gold medalist(s)		Alfréd Hajós; Hungary
2nd place, silver medalist(s)		Ioannis Andreou; Greece

The men's 1200 metre freestyle was one of the four swimming events on the Swimming at the 1896 Summer Olympics programme.

The final swimming race was the longest. Despite having already won the 100 metre race, Hajós competed again in the 1,200 metres along with eight other swimmers. He won once again, finishing nearly 100 metres ahead of the rest of the field. Neumann, who had won the 500 metres, was unable to finish the 1,200. The places of Williams and the five Greeks who did not finish in the top two are unknown, as are the full names of four of those Greeks and any part of the names of three of them.

== Background ==
This was the only appearance of a 1200-metre event. The 1900 Games had a 1000-metre freestyle before the 1 mile/1500 metre length became standard in 1904.

== Competition format ==
This freestyle swimming competition involved a single race, with all swimmers competing at the same time. The swimmers were taken out by ship into the bay, where they would swim toward shore.

== Schedule ==
The 1,200 metre freestyle was the fourth and final swimming event.

Date		Time	Round
Gregorian	Julian	Time	Round
Saturday, 11 April 1896	Saturday, 30 March 1896	11:00	Final

== Results ==
Rank	Swimmer	Nation	Time
1st place, gold medalist(s)	Alfréd Hajós	Hungary	18:22.2
2nd place, silver medalist(s)	Ioannis Andreou	Greece	21:03.4
3–8	Efstathios Chorafas	Greece	Unknown
3–8	N. Katravas	Greece	Unknown
3–8	Gardner Williams	United States	Unknown
3–8	Three others, names unknown	Greece	Unknown
—	Paul Neumann	Austria	DNF
