= Antonios Pepanos =

Greek swimmer

Personal information
- Born: 1866 Patras, Greece
- Died: 1918 (aged 51–52)

Sport
- Sport: Swimming
Medal record
Representing Greece
Olympic Games
Silver medal – second place	1896 Athens	500 metre freestyle

Antonios Pepanos (Greek: Αντώνιος Πέπανος; 1866–1918) was a Greek swimmer. He was a member of Gymnastiki Etaireia Patron, which merged with Panachaikos Gymnastikos Syllogos in 1923 to become Panachaiki Gymnastiki Enosi. He won the silver medal in the 1896 Summer Olympics in Athens.

Before the Olympics, Pepanos was hesitating about taking part because he was already thirty years old and past his prime. Finally, even though he was suffering from a cold on the day of the event, he competed in the 500 metres freestyle. He finished second with a time of 9:57.6. The winner, Austrian Paul Neumann, had finished in 8:12.6.
