= Pasalimani =

Pasalimani (Pasha's harbour in Turkish) may refer to:

- Paşalimanı, a Turkish island in the Sea of Marmara
- Pashaliman Naval Base, a port and military base in Vlorë, Albania
- Harbour of Zea, known colloquially as Pasalimani, a harbor in Piraeus, Greece
