= Petros Persakis =

Greek gymnast

- Πέτρος Περσάκης
- Born: 1879 Athens, Greece
- Relatives: Ioannis Persakis (brother)

Gymnastics career
- Discipline: Men's artistic gymnastics
- Country represented: Greece
- Club: Panellinios Gymnastikos Syllogos
Medal record
Men's artistic gymnastics
Representing Greece
Olympic Games
Silver medal – second place	1896 Athens	Team parallel bars
Bronze medal – third place	1896 Athens	Rings

Petros Persakis (Greek: Πέτρος Περσάκης; born 1879 in Athens) was a Greek gymnast. He competed at the 1896 Summer Olympics in Athens.

Persakis competed in the individual rings and team parallel bars events. He placed third in the rings event. In the team parallel bars, Persakis was a member of the Panellinios Gymnastikos Syllogos team that placed second of the three teams in the event, giving him a silver medal.
