= Shooting at the 1896 Summer Olympics – Men's 30 metre pistol =

Olympic shooting event

Men's 30 metre pistol at the Games of the I Olympiad
- Shooting pictogram
- Venue: Kallithea shooting range
- Date: April 11, 1896
- Competitors: 5 from 3 nations
- Winning score: 442

Medalists
1st place, gold medalist(s)		Sumner Paine; United States
2nd place, silver medalist(s)		Holger Nielsen; Denmark
3rd place, bronze medalist(s)		Ioannis Frangoudis; Greece

The men's 30 metre individual competition with free revolver was one of the five sport shooting events on the 1896 Summer Olympics shooting program. Six competitors entered the pistol event on 11 April. Having won the 25 metre military pistol event, John Paine then withdrew from the 30 metre free pistol event, citing his desire to not embarrass his Greek hosts. He also said he had an agreement with his brother that whoever won the first event between them would drop out the next event. The competitors each shot five strings of six shots. Sumner Paine won the event.

== Background ==
This was the first appearance of what would become standardised as the men's ISSF 50 meter pistol event. The event was held at every Summer Olympics from 1896 to 1920 (except 1904, when no shooting events were held) and from 1936 to 2016; it was open to women from 1968 to 1980. This was the only time that the event was held at a distance of 30 metres; in 1900 the distance would move to the 50 metres that would become standard (with the exception that yards were used in 1908).

Paine used a Smith & Wesson New Model 3 Revolver.

== Competition format ==
The competition had each shooter fire 30 shots, in 5 strings of 6, at a range of 30 metres. Scoring involved multiplying target hits by points scored in each string. Each target had a score of up to 6. The maximum score possible in each string of shots was 216 (6 hits times 6 scores of 6); for the 5-string total, the maximum was 1080 points

== Schedule ==
The free pistol event was the first shooting event on the sixth day of competition.

Date		Time	Round
Gregorian	Julian	Time	Round
Saturday, 11 April 1896	Saturday, 30 March 1896	9:00	Final

== Results ==
Rank	Shooter	Nation	Hits	1	2	3	4	5	Score
1st place, gold medalist(s)	Sumner Paine	United States	24	76	64	80	120	102	442
2nd place, silver medalist(s)	Holger Nielsen	Denmark	Unknown	12	85	62	24	100	285
3rd place, bronze medalist(s)	Ioannis Frangoudis	Greece	Unknown						
4	Nikolaos Morakis	Greece	Unknown						
5	Georgios Orphanidis	Greece	Unknown						
