= Denmark at the 1896 Summer Olympics =

- IOC code: DEN
- NOC: Danish Sports Confederation

in Athens, Greece April 6, 1896 – April 15, 1896
- Competitors: 3 in 5 sports and 12 events
- Medals Ranked 9th: Gold 1 Silver 2 Bronze 3 Total 6

Summer Olympics appearances (overview)
- 1896; 1900; 1904; 1908; 1912; 1920; 1924; 1928; 1932; 1936; 1948; 1952; 1956; 1960; 1964; 1968; 1972; 1976; 1980; 1984; 1988; 1992; 1996; 2000; 2004; 2008; 2012; 2016; 2020; 2024

Other related appearances
- 1906 Intercalated Games

Three athletes from Denmark competed in five sports at the 1896 Summer Olympics in Athens. Two of the three combined to win a gold medal, two silvers, and three bronzes, while Eugen Schmidt earned no medals. Viggo Jensen contributed one of each color, while Holger Nielsen earned the second silver and two bronzes. Shooting and weightlifting were Denmark's most successful sports. Denmark had 15 entries in 12 events, winning six medals.

== Medalists ==
The following competitors won medals at the games. In the discipline sections below, the medalists' names are bolded.

Medal	Name	Sport	Event	Date
Gold	Viggo Jensen	Weightlifting	Men's two hand lift	April 7
Silver	Holger Nielsen	Shooting	Men's 30 m free pistol	April 11
Silver	Viggo Jensen	Weightlifting	Men's one hand lift	April 7
Bronze	Holger Nielsen	Fencing	Men's sabre	April 9
Bronze	Viggo Jensen	Shooting	Men's 300 m free rifle, three positions	April 12
Bronze	Holger Nielsen	Shooting	Men's 25 m rapid fire pistol	April 11

Medals by sport
Sport	1st place, gold medalist(s)	2nd place, silver medalist(s)	3rd place, bronze medalist(s)	Total
Weightlifting	1	1	0	**2**
Shooting	0	1	2	**3**
Fencing	0	0	1	**1**
Total	1	2	3	6

=== Multiple medalists ===
The following competitors won multiple medals at the 1896 Olympic Games.

Name	Medal	Sport	Event
Viggo Jensen	Gold; Silver; Bronze	Weightlifting; Shooting	Men's two hand lift Men's one hand lift Men's 300 metre free rifle
Holger Nielsen	Silver; Bronze; Bronze	Shooting; Fencing	Men's 30 metre pistol Men's 25 metre rapid fire pistol Men's sabre

== Competitors ==
The following is the list of number of competitors in the Games.

Sport	Men	Women	Total
Athletics	3	0	3
Fencing	1	0	1
Gymnastics	1	0	1
Shooting	2	0	2
Weightlifting	1	0	1
Total	3	0	3

Medals by day
Day	Date	1st place, gold medalist(s)	2nd place, silver medalist(s)	3rd place, bronze medalist(s)	Total
1	6 April	0	0	0	0
2	7 April	1	1	0	2
3	8 April	0	0	0	0
4	9 April	0	0	1	1
5	10 April	0	0	0	0
6	11 April	0	1	1	2
7	12 April	0	0	1	1
8	13 April	0	0	0	0
Total		1	2	3	6

== Athletics ==
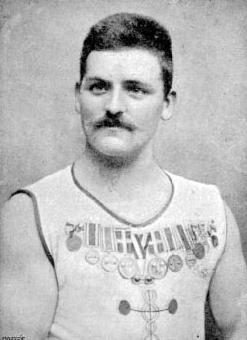
Viggo Jensen

Denmark's three athletes had little success in the 100 metres or the discus throw. Jensen took fourth place in the shot put competition, the closest to an athletics medal the Danish team came.

Track & road events

Athlete	Event	Heat		Final	
Athlete	Event	Time	Rank	Time	Rank
Eugen Schmidt	100 m	Unknown	4	Did not advance	

Field events

Athlete	Event	Final	
Athlete	Event	Distance	Position
Viggo Jensen	Men's shot put	Unknown	4
Holger Nielsen	Men's shot put	DNS	
Charles Winckler	Men's shot put	DNS	
Viggo Jensen	Men's discus throw	Unknown	5-9
Holger Nielsen	Men's discus throw	Unknown	5-9
Charles Winckler	Men's discus throw	DNS	

== Fencing ==
One of Nielsen's two bronzes came in the fencing competition, in which he won half of his four matches.

Athlete	Event	Record		Touches		Rank
Athlete	Event	Wins	Losses	For	Against	Rank
Holger Nielsen	Sabre	2	2	10	9	3rd place, bronze medalist(s)

Opponent nation	Wins	Losses	Percent
Austria	1	0	1.000
Greece	1	2	.333
Total	2	2	.500

== Gymnastics ==
Jensen placed fourth of five competitors in the rope climbing contest, not reaching the top of the 14-metre rope. His actual distance climbed is unknown but it was less than 12.5 metres, the distance of the bronze medallist.

Athlete	Event	Result	Rank
Viggo Jensen	Rope climbing	Unknown	4

== Shooting ==
Jensen and Nielsen both earned bronze medals in the shooting competitions, with Nielsen also winning a silver medal. Jensen specialized in the rifle events, taking 6th of 42 and 3rd of 20 in the two events. Nielsen did not finish his rifle competition, but performed well in the pistol events, in which he won two medals and took 5th place of 16 in the third event.

Athlete	Event	Final	
Athlete	Event	Score	Rank
Viggo Jensen	Men's 200 m military rifle	1640	6
Holger Nielsen	Men's 200 m military rifle	DNF	
Viggo Jensen	Men's 300 m free rifle	1305	3rd place, bronze medalist(s)
Holger Nielsen	Men's 25 m military pistol	Unknown	5
Holger Nielsen	Men's 25 m rapid fire pistol	Unknown	3rd place, bronze medalist(s)
Holger Nielsen	Men's 30 m pistol	285	2nd place, silver medalist(s)

== Weightlifting ==
Jensen tied Launceston Elliot for weight lifted in the first event, the two handed lift. Prince George of Greece, the judge for the event, determined that Jensen had lifted the 111.5 kilograms in better style than Elliot, awarded the Dane the gold medal. In the second event, the one handed, Jensen's 57 kilograms were not close to Elliot's 71 kilograms and thus Jensen took second place in that event.

Athlete	Event	Weight	Rank
Viggo Jensen	One hand lift	57.0	2nd place, silver medalist(s)
Viggo Jensen	Two hand lift	111.5	1st place, gold medalist(s)
