= Shooting at the 1896 Summer Olympics – Men's 25 metre rapid fire pistol =

Olympic shooting event

Men's 25 metre muzzle-loading pistol at the Games of the I Olympiad
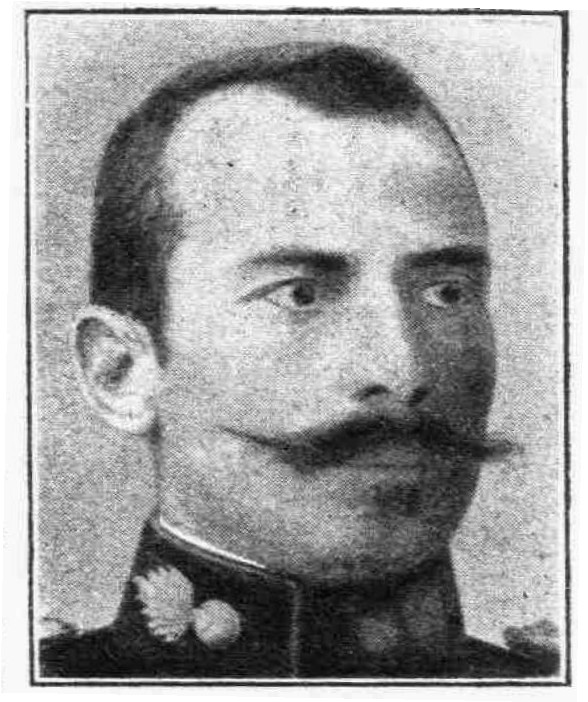
- Ioannis Frangoudis
- Venue: Kallithea shooting range
- Date: April 11, 1896
- Competitors: 4 from 3 nations
- Winning score: 344

Medalists
1st place, gold medalist(s)		Ioannis Frangoudis; Greece
2nd place, silver medalist(s)		Georgios Orphanidis; Greece
3rd place, bronze medalist(s)		Holger Nielsen; Denmark

The 25 metre muzzle-loading pistol was one of the five sport shooting events on the 1896 Summer Olympics shooting programme. The armament of the American Paine brothers was disqualified because of not being "of the usual calibre" for the event (only pistols of .45 caliber were allowed). With the Paine brothers declining the offer of the Greek shooters to use their pistols, only four shooters entered the fourth shooting event. Three nations were represented. Each shooter fired five strings of six shots at a target 25 m (27 yd) distant. The competition was held on 11 April and resulted in the top two places going to the Greek marksmen. Nielsen took third place and Merlin did not finish.

== Background ==
This was the first appearance of what would become standardised as the men's ISSF 25 meter rapid fire pistol event, the only event on the 2020 programme that traces back to 1896. The event has been held at every Summer Olympics except 1904 and 1928 (when no shooting events were held) and 1908; it was open to women from 1968 to 1980.

== Competition format ==
The competition had each shooter fire 30 shots, in 5 strings of 6, at a range of 25 metres. Scoring involved multiplying target hits by points scored in each string. Each target had a score of up to 6. The maximum score possible in each string of shots was 216 (6 hits times 6 scores of 6); for the 5-string total, the maximum was 1080 points. The required weapon was a .45 calibre muzzle-loading pistol.

== Schedule ==
The muzzle-loading pistol event was the second shooting event on the sixth day of competition, following the free pistol.

Date		Time	Round
Gregorian	Julian	Time	Round
Saturday, 11 April 1896	Saturday, 30 March 1896	9:00	Final

== Results ==
Rank	Shooter	Nation	Score	Hits
1st place, gold medalist(s)	Ioannis Frangoudis	Greece	344	23
2nd place, silver medalist(s)	Georgios Orphanidis	Greece	249	20
3rd place, bronze medalist(s)	Holger Nielsen	Denmark	Unknown	
–	Sidney Merlin	Great Britain	Did not finish	
