= Georgios Paraskevopoulos =

Greek cyclist

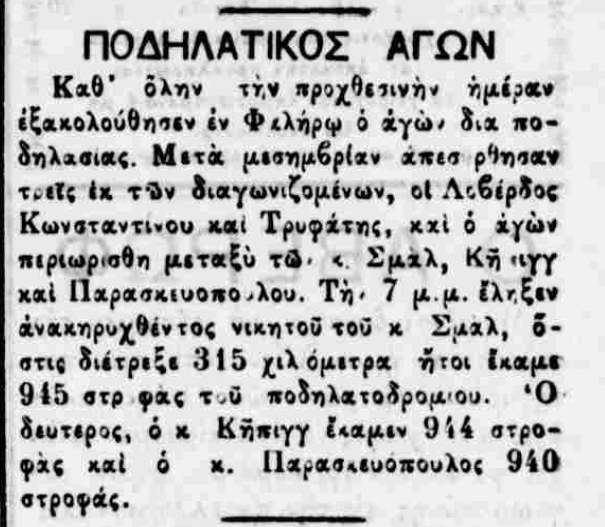
Newspaper article indicating the 3rd place of Georgios Paraskevopoulos in the 12 hour cycling race of the 1896 Olympic Games having completed 940 laps.

Georgios Paraskevopoulos (Greek: Γεώργιος Παρασκευόπουλος) was a Greek cyclist. He participated in the 1896 Summer Olympics in Athens. Paraskevopoulos competed in the 12 hour race and the road race. According to the data provided by the official website of the Olympic Games, Paraskevopoulos did not finish the 12 hour race and there is no third winner. However, according to the Hellenic Olympic Committee, Paraskevopoulos did finish, and therefore is recognised by HOC as bronze medalist, having completed 940 laps of the Neo Phaliron Velodrome. This is supported by a short article in a Greek newspaper on the following day.

In the road race, Paraskevopoulos was not among the top three out of the seven cyclists to compete.
