= Aristovoulos Petmezas =

Greek gymnast and sport shooter

- Αριστόβουλος Πετμεζάς
- Born: Kalavryta, Greece

Gymnastics career
- Discipline: Men's artistic gymnastics
- Country represented: Greece
- Gym: Panakhaikos Gymnastikos Syllogos

Aristovoulos Petmezas (Greek: Αριστόβουλος Πετμεζάς) was a Greek gymnast and sport shooter. He was born in Kalavryta. He competed in the 1896 Summer Olympics in Athens.

Petmezas entered the pommel horse event. He did not earn a medal, though beyond that his placement in the competition is unknown. He also competed in the military rifle and military pistol events. His places and scores in those competitions are also unknown, though he must have placed between 14th and 41st in the rifle and between 6th and 13th in the pistol.
