= Thomas Xenakis =

Greek gymnast (1875–1942)

- Θωμάς Ξενάκης
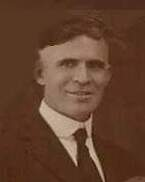
- Born: 30 March 1875 Naxos, Greece
- Died: 7 July 1942 (aged 67) Orange County, California, US

Gymnastics career
- Discipline: Men's artistic gymnastics
- Country represented: Greece
- Club: Panellinios Gymnastikos Syllogos
Medal record
Men's artistic gymnastics
Representing Greece
Olympic Games
Silver medal – second place	1896 Athens	Team parallel bars
Silver medal – second place	1896 Athens	Rope climbing

Thomas Xenakis (Greek: Θωμάς Ξενάκης; March 30, 1875 – July 7, 1942) was a Greek gymnast. He competed at the 1896 Summer Olympics in Athens. He was born in Naxos and died in Orange, California, United States.

Xenakis competed in the rope climbing event. He and his countryman Nikolaos Andriakopoulos were the only two out of the five entrants to climb all the way to the top of the 14-metre rope. Xenakis' time is unknown, though it was slower than 23.4 seconds, which was Andriakopoulos's winning time.

He won his second silver medal as a member of the Greek gymnastics team in the parallel bars event.
