= Nikolaos Andriakopoulos =

Greek gymnast

- Νικόλαος Ανδριακόπουλος
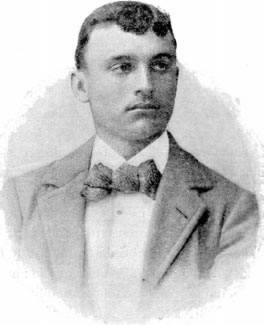
- Andriakopoulos in 1896

Personal information
- Born: 1878 Patras, Greece

Gymnastics career
- Discipline: Men's artistic gymnastics
- Country represented: Greece
- Club: Panellinios Gymnastikos Syllogos
Medal record
Men's artistic gymnastics
Representing Greece
Olympic Games
Gold medal – first place	1896 Athens	Rope climbing
Silver medal – second place	1896 Athens	Team parallel bars

Nikolaos Andriakopoulos (Greek: Νικόλαος Ανδριακόπουλος; 1878 in Patras – after 1896) was a Greek gymnast. He was a member of Panachaikos Gymnastikos Syllogos, that merged in 1923 with Gymnastiki Etaireia Patron to become Panachaiki Gymnastiki Enosi.

== Olympics performances ==
Andriakopoulos competed at the 1896 Summer Olympics, Athens, in the rope climbing event. He and countryman Thomas Xenakis were the only two out of the five entrants to climb all the way to the top of the 14-meter rope. Andriakopoulos finished in 23.4 seconds, defeating Xenakis to claim the gold medal. This would be the last Greek gold medal in gymnastics until Ioannis Melissanidis won gold in the floor exercise in 1996.

He also entered the team parallel bars event. In that competition, Andriakopoulos was a member of the Panellinios Gymnastikos Syllogos team that placed second in the event, giving him an Olympic silver medal.
