= Miltiadis Gouskos =

Greek athlete

Olympic medal record

Men's athletics

Representing Greece
Silver medal – second place	1896 Athens	Shot put

Miltiadis Gouskos (or Gouschos) (Greek: Μιλτιάδης Γκούσκος, born 1877 in Zakynthos, Greece; died 9 July 1903 in British Raj) was a Greek athlete. He was born in Zakynthos and died in the British Indian Empire from food poisoning. He competed at the 1896 Summer Olympics in Athens in the shot put, placing second to Robert Garrett of the United States. Gouskos's best throw was 11.03 metres, short of Garrett's 11.22 metres.
