= Georgios Diamantis =

Greek sport shooter

Georgios Diamantis (Greek: Γεώργιος Διαμαντής) was a Greek sport shooter. He competed at the 1896 Summer Olympics in Athens. Diamantis competed in the two rifle events. In the military rifle event, he placed seventh with a score of 1,456. In the second string of ten shots, he scored 384. His score and place in the free rifle event is unknown, except that he did not win a medal.
