= Efstathios Chorafas =

Greek swimmer

Personal information
- Born: 1871 Cephalonia, Greece

Sport
- Sport: Swimming
Medal record
Representing Greece
Olympic Games
Bronze medal – third place	1896 Athens	500 m freestyle

Efstathios Chorafas or Khorafas (Greek: Ευστάθιος Χωραφάς, born 1871, date of death unknown) was a Greek swimmer. He competed at the 1896 Summer Olympics in Athens.

== Participation at the 1896 Summer Olympics ==
Chorafas was the only swimmer to compete in all three of the open swimming events, as they were contested immediately after each other. His results are disputed.

=== Third place at 500 m. freestyle ===
According to current data provided at the official website of the Olympic Games, Chorafas has won only one third place at the Men's 500 m freestyle, being the last of only three swimmers who finally participated at the event.

=== Disputed medals ===
==== 100 m. freestyle ====
As for the Men's 100 metre freestyle, nowadays Otto Herschmann is cited as second, with Chorafas cited in an unknown position, between third and sixth one. According to an Austrian article, Otto Herschmann's second place, and thus silver medal, was silently recognised by IOC by the time of the 2012 Summer Olympics.

However, the Hellenic Olympic Committee considers Chorafas as 2nd with a time of 1.23.0. The second place of Chorafas in this event is supported by the Official Report of the 1896 Summer Olympics, as well by Greek newspapers of that time.

==== 1200 m. freestyle ====
Concerning the Men's 1200 m freestyle event, the official website of the Olympic Games does not recognize a bronze medalist, citing Chorafas among three swimmers in unknown position, between the third and the fifth one.

However, the Hellenic Olympic Committee considers Chorafas as 3rd in this event .

In the 1,200 metres freestyle, he bested six other swimmers despite having already swum 600 metres in close succession.
