= Spiridon Stais =

Greek sport shooter

Spiridon Stais (Greek: Σπιρίδων Στάης) was a Greek sport shooter. He competed at the 1896 Summer Olympics in Athens. Theofilakis competed in the military rifle event. He tied for twelfth place with Eugen Schmidt at 845 points.
