= Xenon Mikhailidis =

Greek sports shooter

Xenon Mikhailidis (Greek: Ζήνων Μιχαηλίδης) was a Greek shooter. He competed at the 1896 Summer Olympics in Athens. Michailidis competed in the free rifle event and military pistol event. His place and score in those competitions are not known, though he did not finish in the top five.
