= Wrestling at the 1896 Summer Olympics =

Wrestling at the Games of the I Olympiad
- Wrestling pictogram
- Venue: Panathinaiko Stadium
- Dates: 10–11 April 1896
- No. of events: 1 (1 men, 0 women)
- Competitors: 5 from 4 nations

At the 1896 Summer Olympics, one wrestling event was contested. It was organized and prepared by the Sub-Committee for Wrestling and Gymnastics. Five competitors from four nations competed.

== Medal summary ==
These medals are retroactively assigned by the International Olympic Committee; at the time, winners were given a silver medal and subsequent places received no award.

Event	Gold	Silver	Bronze
Greco-Roman	Carl Schuhmann; Germany	Georgios Tsitas; Greece	Stephanos Christopoulos; Greece

== Participating nations ==
A total of 5 wrestlers from 4 nations competed at the Athens Games:

- Germany (1)
- Great Britain (1)
- Greece (2)
- Hungary (1)

== Medal table ==
Rank	Nation	Gold	Silver	Bronze	Total
1	Germany	1	0	0	1
2	Greece	0	1	1	2
Totals (2 entries)		1	1	1	3

== Sub-Committee for Wrestling and Gymnastics ==
- Joan. Phokianos, president
- George Streit, secretary
- Joan. Yenissarlis
- Loukas Belos
- Nic. Politis
- Chas. Waldstein
- Dimitri Aighinitis
- Dim. Sekkeris
- Spiridon Comoundouros
- Const. Manos
- Sp. Antonopoulos

== See also ==
- List of World and Olympic Champions in men's freestyle wrestling
- List of World and Olympic Champions in Greco-Roman wrestling
