= Alexios Fetsios =

Greek sport shooter

Alexios Fetsios (Greek: Αλέξιος Φέτσιος) was a Greek sport shooter. He competed at the 1896 Summer Olympics in Athens. Fetsios competed in the two rifle events. In the military rifle event, he placed eleventh with a score of 894. In the second string of ten shots, he scored 272. His score and place in the free rifle event is unknown, except that he did not win a medal.
