= Swimming at the 1896 Summer Olympics – Men's 500 metre freestyle =

Men's 500 metre freestyle at the Games of the I Olympiad
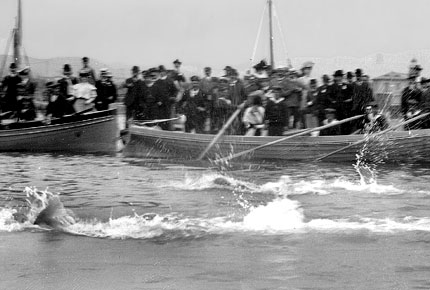
- Swimming at the 1896 Summer Olympics
- Venue: Bay of Zea
- Date: April 11
- Competitors: 3 from 2 nations
- Winning time: 8:12.6

Medalists
1st place, gold medalist(s)		Paul Neumann; Austria
2nd place, silver medalist(s)		Antonios Pepanos; Greece
3rd place, bronze medalist(s)		Efstathios Chorafas; Greece

The men's 500 metre freestyle was one of the four swimming events on the Swimming at the 1896 Summer Olympics programme.

Only three swimmers entered the 500 metre freestyle. Paul Neumann added Austria's first gold medal to Herschmann's silver. Alfréd Hajós, the winner of the 100m, had intended to sweep the three open swimming events, but did not compete in the 500m because it was begun immediately after the 100 metres. Chorophas was the only swimmer to compete in all three events.

== Background ==
This was the only appearance of a 500-metre freestyle event, with 1900 having 200- and 1000-metre events and the now-standard 400 metre event debuting in 1904 (in yards, for that Games only).

== Competition format ==
This freestyle swimming competition involved a single race, with all swimmers competing at the same time. The swimmers were taken out by ship into the bay, where they would swim toward shore.

== Schedule ==
The 500 metre freestyle was the third of the swimming events, held shortly after the 100 metre freestyle and the sailor-only 100 metre freestyle.

Date		Time	Round
Gregorian	Julian	Time	Round
Saturday, 11 April 1896	Saturday, 30 March 1896	11:00	Final

== Results ==
Rank	Swimmer	Nation	Time
1st place, gold medalist(s)	Paul Neumann	Austria	8:12.6
2nd place, silver medalist(s)	Antonios Pepanos	Greece	9:57.6
3rd place, bronze medalist(s)	Efstathios Chorafas	Greece	Unknown
