= Georgios Papasideris =

Greek sportsman (1875–1920)

Olympic medal record

Men's athletics

Representing Greece
Bronze medal – third place	1896 Athens	Shot put

Georgios Saranti Papasideris (Greek: Γεώργιος/Γιώργος Παπασιδέρης, 1875 in Koropi – 1920) was a Greek athlete and weightlifter.

== Career ==
Papasideris was born in Koropi.

He competed at the 1896 Summer Olympics in Athens. He competed in the shot put, placing third. His best throw was 10.36 metres.

Papasideris also threw the discus, placing somewhere between fifth and last (ninth) place.

In the two-handed weightlifting event, now known as clean and jerk, Papasideris tied for fourth place with Carl Schuhmann of Germany. They had both lifted 90.0 kilograms.
