= Ioannis Andreou =

Greek swimmer

Sport
- Sport: Swimming
Medal record
Representing Greece
Olympic Games
| Silver medal – second place | 1896 Athens | 1200 m freestyle |

Ioannis Andreou (Greek: Ιωάννης Ανδρέου) was a Greek swimmer. He competed at the 1896 Summer Olympics in Athens.

Andreou competed in the 1,200 metres freestyle event. He placed second of the seven swimmers, with a time of 21:03.4. The winner, Alfréd Hajós, had finished in 18:22.2.
