= Paul Neumann (swimmer) =

Austrian swimmer

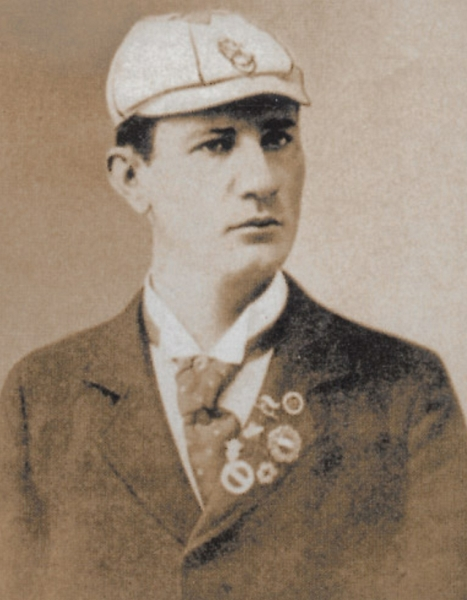

Personal information
- Born: 13 June 1875 Vienna, Austria-Hungary
- Died: 9 February 1932 (aged 56) Vienna, Austria

Sport
- Country: Austria
- Sport: Swimming
Medal record
Men's swimming
Representing Austrian Empire
Olympic Games
Gold medal – first place	1896 Athens	500 m freestyle

Paul Neumann (13 June 1875 in Vienna – 9 February 1932) was an Austrian swimmer and physician, who competed at the 1896 Summer Olympics in Athens and became the first ever Austrian gold medalist.

== Biography ==
Neumann was Jewish, and born in Vienna. Neumann was first noticed for his swimming when in 1892 he won the Austrian National River Championship, two years later he won the 500 metres at the Austrian Championships. In 1896 Neumann travelled to Athens and competed in 1896 Summer Olympics, all three swimming events were on the same day, so with Alfréd Hajós, from Hungary withdrawing from the 500 metre freestyle race because he needed time to recover after winning the 100 metres, there were only three competitors for the 500 metres, which Neumann won in a time of 8:12.6 minutes nearly two minutes faster than his rivals. Neumann also entered the 1200 metre freestyle which was straight after his victory which is why he didn't finish the race.

He immigrated to the U.S. after the 1896 Olympic Games. There, he became a physician, and earned a Ph.D. in philosophy.

In 1897 while competing for the Chicago Athletics Association he set world records at 2, 3, 4, and 5 miles and in the same year he won the American and Canadian Freestyle Swimming Championships.

In 1984, Neumann was inducted into the International Jewish Sports Hall of Fame, and two years later he was inducted into the International Swimming Hall of Fame.

== See also ==
- List of members of the International Swimming Hall of Fame
- List of select Jewish swimmers
