= Ioannis Mitropoulos =

Greek artistic gymnast

- Ιωάννης Μητρόπουλος
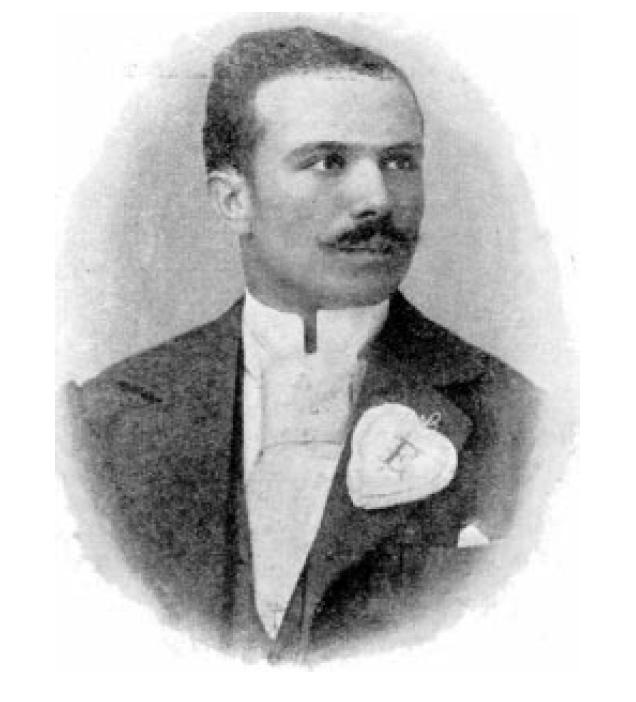

Personal information
- Born: 1874 Athens, Greece

Gymnastics career
- Discipline: Men's artistic gymnastics
- Country represented: Greece
- Club: Ethnikos Gymnastikos Syllogos
Medal record
Men's artistic gymnastics
Representing Greece
Olympic Games
Gold medal – first place	1896 Athens	Rings
Bronze medal – third place	1896 Athens	Team parallel bars

Ioannis Mitropoulos (Greek: Ιωάννης Μητρόπουλος; 1874 – after 1896) was a Greek gymnast. He competed at the 1896 Summer Olympics in Athens.

Mitropoulos competed in both the individual and team events of the parallel bars and the individual rings event. In the rings event, he gave Greece its first gold medal in gymnastics. He did not win a medal in the individual parallel bars event, though his ranking is unknown. In the team event, Mitropoulos was a member of the Ethnikos Gymnastikos Syllogos team that placed third of the three teams in the event, giving him a bronze medal.
