= Gymnastics at the 1896 Summer Olympics – Men's rings =

Gymnastics at the Olympics

Men's rings at the Games of the I Olympiad
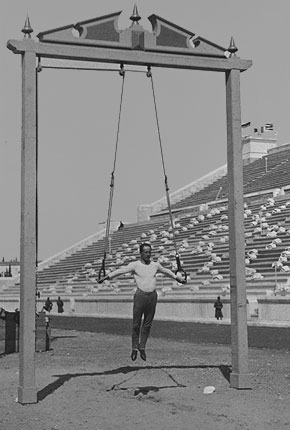
- Weingärtner competing in the rings event
- Venue: Panathinaiko Stadium
- Date: April 9, 1896
- Competitors: 8 from 3 nations

Medalists
1st place, gold medalist(s)		Ioannis Mitropoulos; Greece
2nd place, silver medalist(s)		Hermann Weingärtner; Germany
3rd place, bronze medalist(s)		Petros Persakis; Greece

The men's rings was one of eight gymnastics events on the Gymnastics at the 1896 Summer Olympics programme. The fifth event, it was held on 9 April. There were eight competitors from three nations. The Greeks won the gold and bronze medals, with Hermann Weingärtner winning his fifth medal. Places 1–3 and 5 are known, but 4th place is not—any of the four athletes whose places are not known may have occupied the fourth position.

== Background ==
This was the first appearance of the event, which is one of the five apparatus events held every time there were apparatus events at the Summer Olympics (no apparatus events were held in 1900, 1908, 1912, or 1920). The field consisted of 5 Germans, 2 Greeks, and possibly one Hungarian.

== Competition format ==
Judges awarded the prizes, but little is known of the scoring and rankings. Each gymnast performed a routine two minutes long.

== Schedule ==
The men's rings was held in the afternoon of the fourth day of events, following the 800 metres, team parallel bars, team horizontal bar, vault, and pommel horse.

Date		Time	Round
Gregorian	Julian	Time	Round
Thursday, 9 April 1896	Thursday, 28 March 1896	Afternoon	Final

== Results ==
Three judges ranked Mitropoulos first while three other judges ranked Weingärtner first. Prince George broke the tie, in favor of Mitropoulos.

Rank	Gymnast	Nation
1st place, gold medalist(s)	Ioannis Mitropoulos	Greece
2nd place, silver medalist(s)	Hermann Weingärtner	Germany
3rd place, bronze medalist(s)	Petros Persakis	Greece
5	Carl Schuhmann	Germany
4, 6–8	Konrad Böcker	Germany
4, 6–8	Alfred Flatow	Germany
4, 6–8	Gustav Flatow	Germany
4, 6–8	Desiderius Wein	Hungary

== Sources ==
- Lampros, S.P.; Polites, N.G.; De Coubertin, Pierre; Philemon, P.J.; Anninos, C. (1897). The Olympic Games: BC 776 – AD 1896. Athens: Charles Beck. (Digitally available at )
- Mallon, Bill; Widlund, Ture (1998). The 1896 Olympic Games. Results for All Competitors in All Events, with Commentary. Jefferson: McFarland. ISBN 0-7864-0379-9. (Excerpt available at )
- Smith, Michael Llewellyn (2004). Olympics in Athens 1896. The Invention of the Modern Olympic Games. London: Profile Books. ISBN 1-86197-342-X.
