= Nikolaos Katravas =

Greek swimmer

Personal information
- Born: Cephalonia, Greece

Sport
- Sport: Swimming

Nikolaos Katravas (Greek: Νικόλαος Κατραβάς 1873-1947) was a Greek swimmer, and painter. He was a student of Nikiforos Lytras. He competed at the 1896 Summer Olympics in Athens, which were the first international Olympic Games held in modern history. Katravas competed in the 1,200 metres freestyle event. His time and place in the competition are unknown, though he did not finish in the top three.
