= Shooting at the 1896 Summer Olympics =

Shooting at the Games of the I Olympiad
- Shooting pictogram
- Venue: Kallithea
- Dates: 8–12 April 1896
- No. of events: 5 (5 men, 0 women)
- Competitors: 61 from 7 nations

At the 1896 Summer Olympics, five sport shooting events were contested. These events took place at the newly constructed shooting range at Kallithea. They were organized and prepared by the Sub-Committee for Shooting. Sixty-one shooters from seven nations competed.

== Medal summary ==
These medals are retroactively assigned by the International Olympic Committee; at the time, winners were given a silver medal and subsequent places received no award.

Event	Gold	Silver	Bronze
200 metre military rifle	Pantelis Karasevdas; Greece	Pavlos Pavlidis; Greece	Nicolaos Trikupis; Greece
300 metre free rifle, three positions	Georgios Orphanidis; Greece	Ioannis Frangoudis; Greece	Viggo Jensen; Denmark
25 metre military pistol	John Paine; United States	Sumner Paine; United States	Nikolaos Morakis; Greece
25 metre rapid fire pistol	Ioannis Frangoudis; Greece	Georgios Orphanidis; Greece	Holger Nielsen; Denmark
30 metre free pistol	Sumner Paine; United States	Holger Nielsen; Denmark	Ioannis Frangoudis; Greece

== Participating nations ==
A total of 61 shooters from 7 nations competed at the Athens Games:

- Denmark (3)
- France (1)
- Great Britain (2)
- Greece (50)
- Italy (1)
- Switzerland (1)
- United States (3)

== Medal table ==
Rank	Nation	Gold	Silver	Bronze	Total
1	Greece	3	3	3	9
2	United States	2	1	0	3
3	Denmark	0	1	2	3
Totals (3 entries)		5	5	5	15

== Sub-Committee for Shooting ==
- HRH Prince Nicholas of Greece, president
- Ioannis Phrangoudis, secretary
- Demosthenes Staikos
- Alc. Krassas
- Joan. Konstantinides
- Alex. Kondostavlos
- Ath. Botzaris
- Ath. Pierrakos
- Georges Antonopoulos
- Stephen Skouloudis

== See also ==
- List of Olympic medalists in shooting
