= Gymnastics at the 1896 Summer Olympics – Men's rope climbing =

Olympic gymnastics event

Men's rope climbing at the Games of the I Olympiad
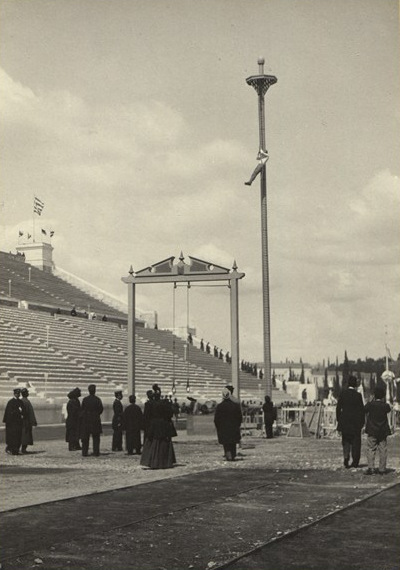
- Rope climbing event during 1896 Summer Olympics
- Venue: Panathinaiko Stadium
- Date: April 10, 1896
- Competitors: 5 from 4 nations

Medalists
1st place, gold medalist(s)		Nikolaos Andriakopoulos; Greece
2nd place, silver medalist(s)		Thomas Xenakis; Greece
3rd place, bronze medalist(s)		Fritz Hofmann; Germany

The men's rope climbing was one of eight gymnastics events on the Gymnastics at the 1896 Summer Olympics programme. The final event in the gymnastics competition, rope climbing was held on 10 April. The rope was 14 metres long, suspended from a frame. Time and style were considered in placing the competitors who reached the top and distance climbed separating those who did not make it all the way up. Five competitors entered, with the two Greeks taking top honors by being the only two to complete the climb. The German Fritz Hofmann won the bronze medal, while the weightlifting champions Viggo Jensen and Launceston Elliot finished fourth and fifth.

== Background ==
This was the first appearance of the event, which was held four times. The event appeared again in 1904, 1924, and 1932.

== Competition format ==
The rope climb was 14 metres in height with a smooth, unknotted rope. Those who completed the climb were ranked on time and style points, with those not reaching the top ranked on height climbed.

== Schedule ==
The men's rope climbing was held in the morning of the fifth day of events. The gymnastics programme was intended to be completed on the fourth day, but after six of the eight events had finished it was too late to continue and the final two were moved to the fifth day. The rope climbing was the second of the two that day, the last gymnastics event held.

Date		Time	Round
Gregorian	Julian	Time	Round
Friday, 10 April 1896	Friday, 29 March 1896	10:00	Final

== Results ==
The heights climbed by Jensen and Elliot are not known, though Jensen climbed higher than Elliot and both were under 12.5 metres. The style points for the finishers are not known. Andriakopoulos finished in 23.4 seconds, quicker than Xenakis, though Xenakis' time is not known beyond that.

Rank	Gymnast	Nation	Height (m)
1st place, gold medalist(s)	Nikolaos Andriakopoulos	Greece	14.0
2nd place, silver medalist(s)	Thomas Xenakis	Greece	14.0
3rd place, bronze medalist(s)	Fritz Hofmann	Germany	12.5
4	Viggo Jensen	Denmark	Unknown
5	Launceston Elliot	Great Britain	Unknown

== Sources ==
- Lampros, S.P.; Polites, N.G.; De Coubertin, Pierre; Philemon, P.J.; Anninos, C. (1897). The Olympic Games: BC 776 – AD 1896. Athens: Charles Beck. (Digitally available at )
- Mallon, Bill; Widlund, Ture (1998). The 1896 Olympic Games. Results for All Competitors in All Events, with Commentary. Jefferson: McFarland. ISBN 0-7864-0379-9. (Excerpt available at )
- Smith, Michael Llewellyn (2004). Olympics in Athens 1896. The Invention of the Modern Olympic Games. London: Profile Books. ISBN 1-86197-342-X.
