= Ioannis Persakis =

Greek triple jumper (1877–1943)

- Ioannis Persakis

Medal record

Men's athletics

Representing Greece

Olympic Games
Bronze medal – third place	1896 Athens	Triple jump

Ioannis Persakis (Greek: Ιωάννης Περσάκης; 1877–1943) was a Greek athlete. He competed at the 1896 Summer Olympics in Athens. He was born in Athens. Persakis competed in the triple jump, taking third place. His best jump was 12.52 metres.
