= Ioannis Frangoudis =

Greek sport shooter

Lieutenant General Ioannis Frangoudis
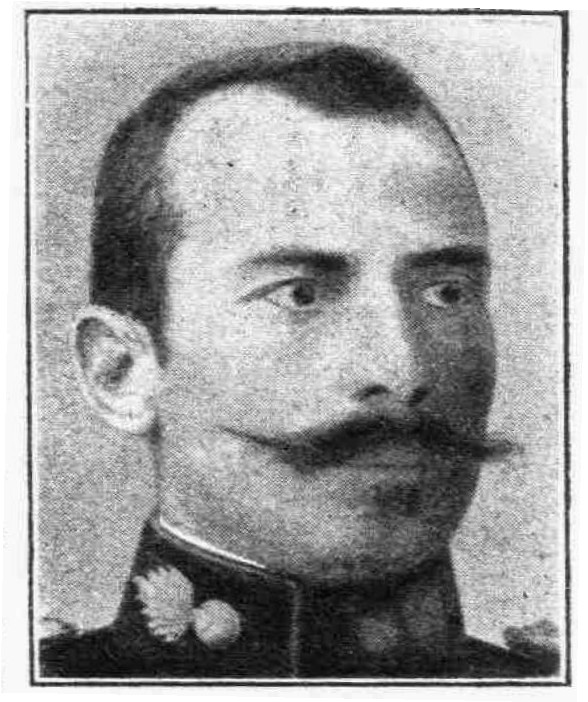
- Photo of Frangoudis c. 1896

Personal information
- Native name: Ιωάννης Φραγκούδης
- Born: 1863 Zakynthos, United States of the Ionian Islands (now Greece)
- Died: 19 October 1916 (aged 52) New York City, United States
- Education: Hellenic Military Academy
- Military career
- Allegiance: Kingdom of Greece
- Branch: Hellenic Army
- Rank: Lieutenant General
- Conflicts: Greco-Turkish War (1897); Balkan Wars: First Balkan War

Sport
- Country: Greece
- Sport: Shooting
Medal record
Men's shooting
Representing Greece
Olympic Games
| Gold medal – first place | 1896 Athens | Rapid fire pistol |
| Silver medal – second place | 1896 Athens | Free rifle |
| Bronze medal – third place | 1896 Athens | Free pistol |

Ioannis Frangoudis (Greek: Ιωάννης Φραγκούδης; 1863 – 19 October 1916) was a Greek Cypriot Military officer, athlete and Olympic shooter. He served in the Hellenic Army reaching the rank of Colonel, and represented the kingdom of Greece in the 1896 Summer Olympics in Athen. Frangoudis is the only Greek athlete who has won a gold, a silver and a bronze medal in a single Olympic.

== Biography ==
Frangoudis was born in Zakynthos, Greece, while his family originated from Limassol, Cyprus, which was under Ottoman Empire at that time. He graduated from the Hellenic Military Academy in 1885, and worked his way up the ranks of the Greek army, being a captain at the time of the 1896 Olympics. After the Greco-Turkish war of 1897, he had become a colonel, and a friend of King George I of Greece. Frangoudis is also known for having been present at the assassination of the King, and for having taken his assassin, Alexandros Schinas, into custody.

Frangoudis died by an electrocution accident in 19 October 1916, while visiting New York City for an ammo supply mission of the Greek army.

== Olympics career ==
Frangoudis competed in four of the five shooting events as well as serving as secretary of the Sub-Committee for Shooting.

He began his sole rifle event, the free rifle, with a lead in the competition after the first string of 10 shots. However, his shooting was inconsistent and his second and fourth strings were far below the scores of his first and third strings. Frangoudis finished second behind Georgios Orfanidis, with 1,312 points to his countryman's 1,583. Viggo Jensen in third place was only 7 points behind Frangoudis.

In the rapid fire pistol, Frangoudis was the victor, defeating Orfanidis, along with two other competitors, 344-249. He added another top three finish in the free pistol, behind Sumner Paine (silver medallist in the military pistol) and Holger Nielsen (bronze medallist in the rapid fire pistol). Frangoudis also competed in the military pistol, finishing fourth.
