= Pavlos Pavlidis =

Greek sport shooter

Medal record

Men's shooting

Representing Greece

Olympic Games
Silver medal – second place	1896 Athens	Military rifle

Pavlos Pavlidis (Greek: Παύλος Παυλίδης, died 1968) was a Greek sport shooter. He competed at the 1896 Summer Olympics in Athens.

Pavlidis placed second in the military rifle competition with a score of 1,978. He had hit the target 38 times out of forty shots, trailing the champion Pantelis Karasevdas by two hits and 372 points.

Pavlidis also competed in the free rifle and military pistol competitions, though his score and place in those events are unknown except that he did not finish in the top five in either.
