= Bay of Zea =

Port in Piraeus, Athens, Greece

Coordinates: 37°56′15″N 23°38′55″E

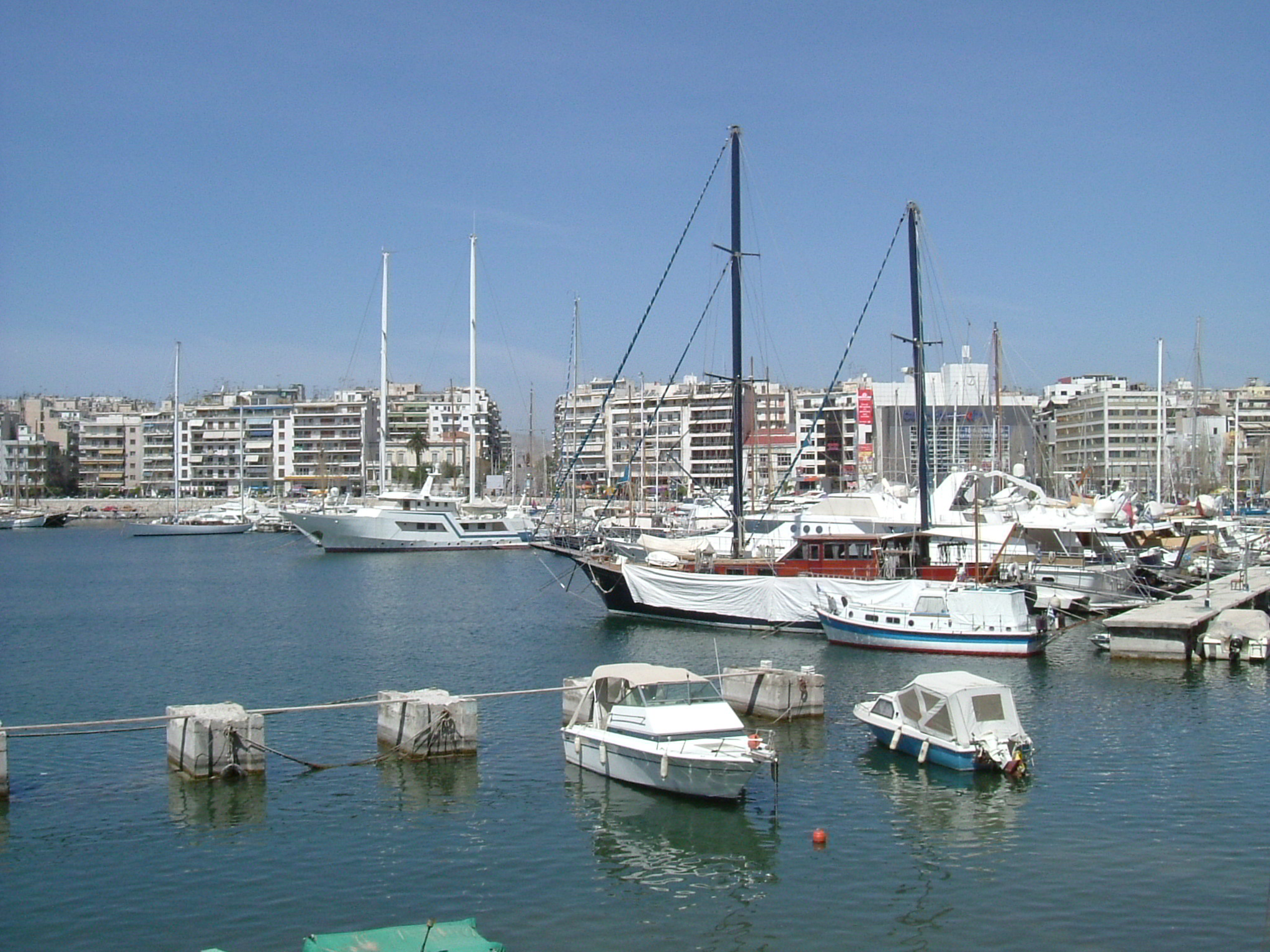
Bay of Zea

The Bay of Zea on a map of Piraeus

The Bay of Zea (Greek: Λιμένας Ζέας, romanized: Limenas Zeas), since Ottoman times and until recently known as Paşalimanı (Πασαλιμάνι), is a broad bay located at the eastern coast of the Piraeus peninsula in Attica, Greece. It hosted the swimming events at the 1896 Summer Olympics held in Attica. A seaport and marina are in the bay. During ancient times this bay was the biggest military harbour, where the fleet of triremes were built. Following its renovation in 2004 in relation to the 2004 Summer Olympics, the seaport now has a total of 670 berths for boats up to 150 meters in length and up to 10 meters in draught. The marina is managed by D Marinas Hellas, a global marinas network, that manages requests and reservations for berthing at Zea as well as services offered at the marina such as fuel, bathrooms, showers, port police, etc. The marina is also a part of the Greek Marinas Association.

== Gallery ==
The Bay of Zea

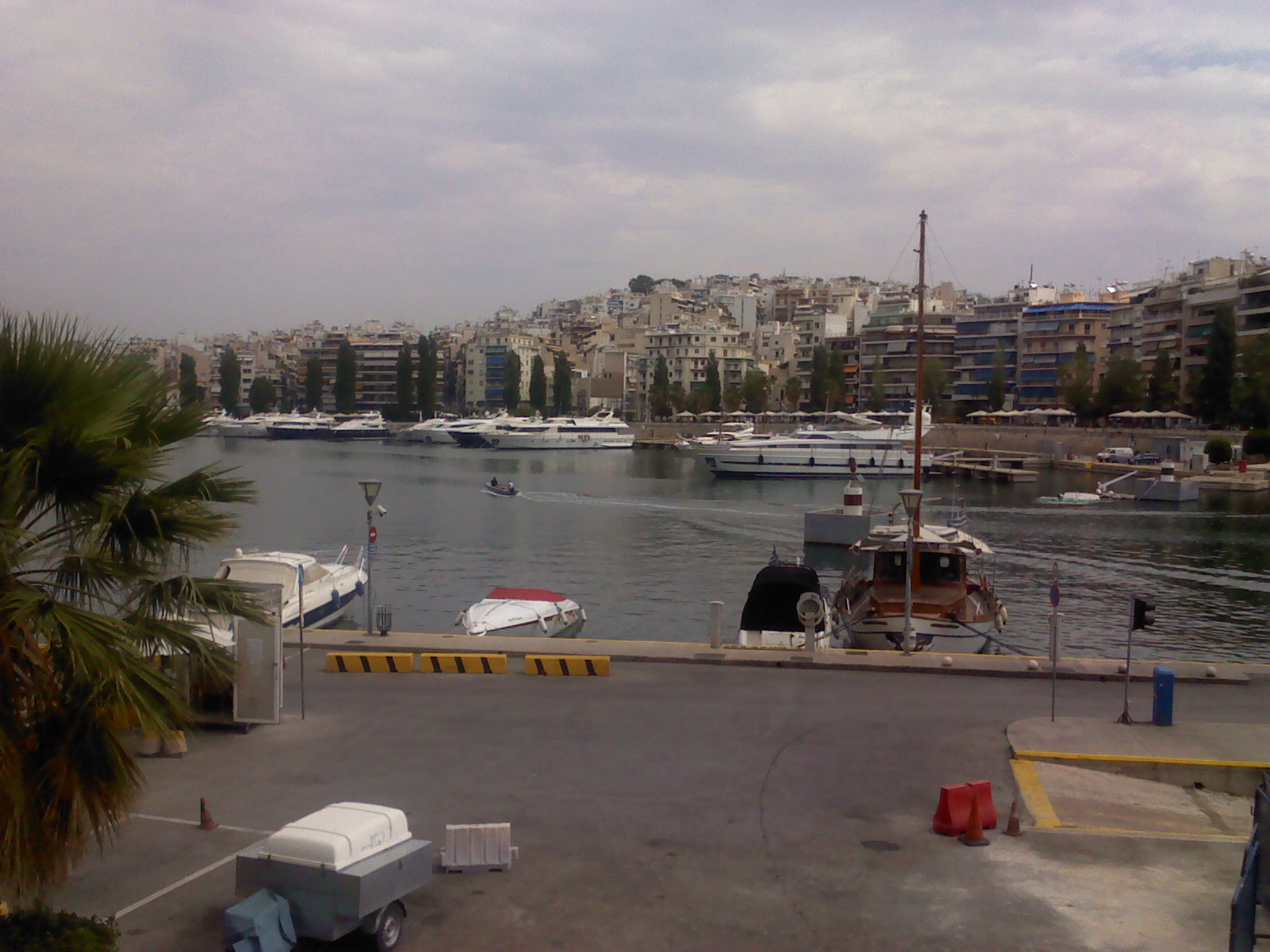
A panoramic view of the bay

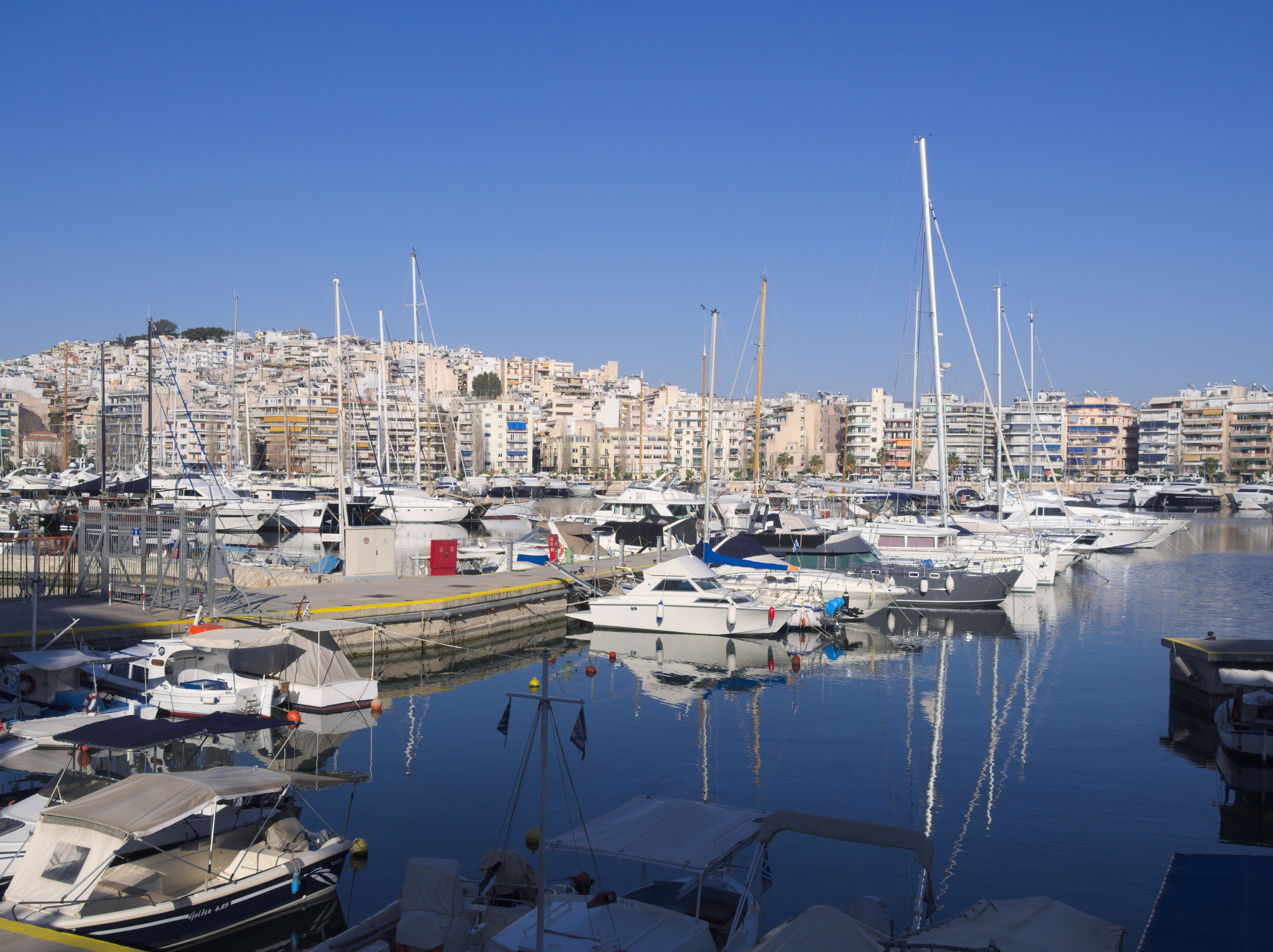
A picture of the marina within the bay
