= Georgios Orphanidis =

Greek sports shooter

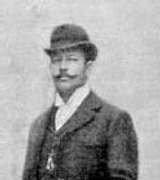
- Georgios Orphanidis at Patras (1897)

Personal information
- Born: 1859 Smyrna, Ottoman Empire
- Died: 1942 (aged 82–83)

Sport
- Sport: Sports shooting
Medal record
Men's shooting
Representing Greece
Olympic Games
Gold medal – first place	1896 Athens	Free rifle
Silver medal – second place	1896 Athens	Rapid fire pistol
Intercalated Games
Gold medal – first place	1906 Athens	50 m pistol

Georgios D. Orphanidis (Greek: Γεώργιος Ορφανίδης; 1859–1942) was an ethnic Greek sports shooter with both pistol and rifle. He competed for Greece at the 1896 Summer Olympics in Athens, at the 1906 Intercalated Games, and at the 1908 Summer Olympics in London.

In 1896 Orphanidis competed in all five of the shooting events: military rifle, free rifle, military pistol, rapid fire pistol, and free pistol. The first event held was the military rifle competition, in which Orphanidis placed fifth after scoring 1,698 points. His place in the second event, the military pistol, is unknown but he did not win a medal. He finished last place (of five) in the free pistol.

Orphanidis placed second in his penultimate event, the rapid fire pistol, scoring 249 points on 20 hits in the event, finishing behind Ioannis Frangoudis. In the free rifle, Orphanidis won an Olympic championship; his score of 1,583 was bolstered by a second-string score of 520 in which he hit the target with all 10 shots. The results for the first, third, and fourth strings were 328, 420, and 315 points, respectively. Orphanidis missed only three times out of the 40 shots; twice in the first string and once in the fourth.
