= 1896 Summer Olympics =

Multi-sport event in Athens, Greece

Games of the I Olympiad
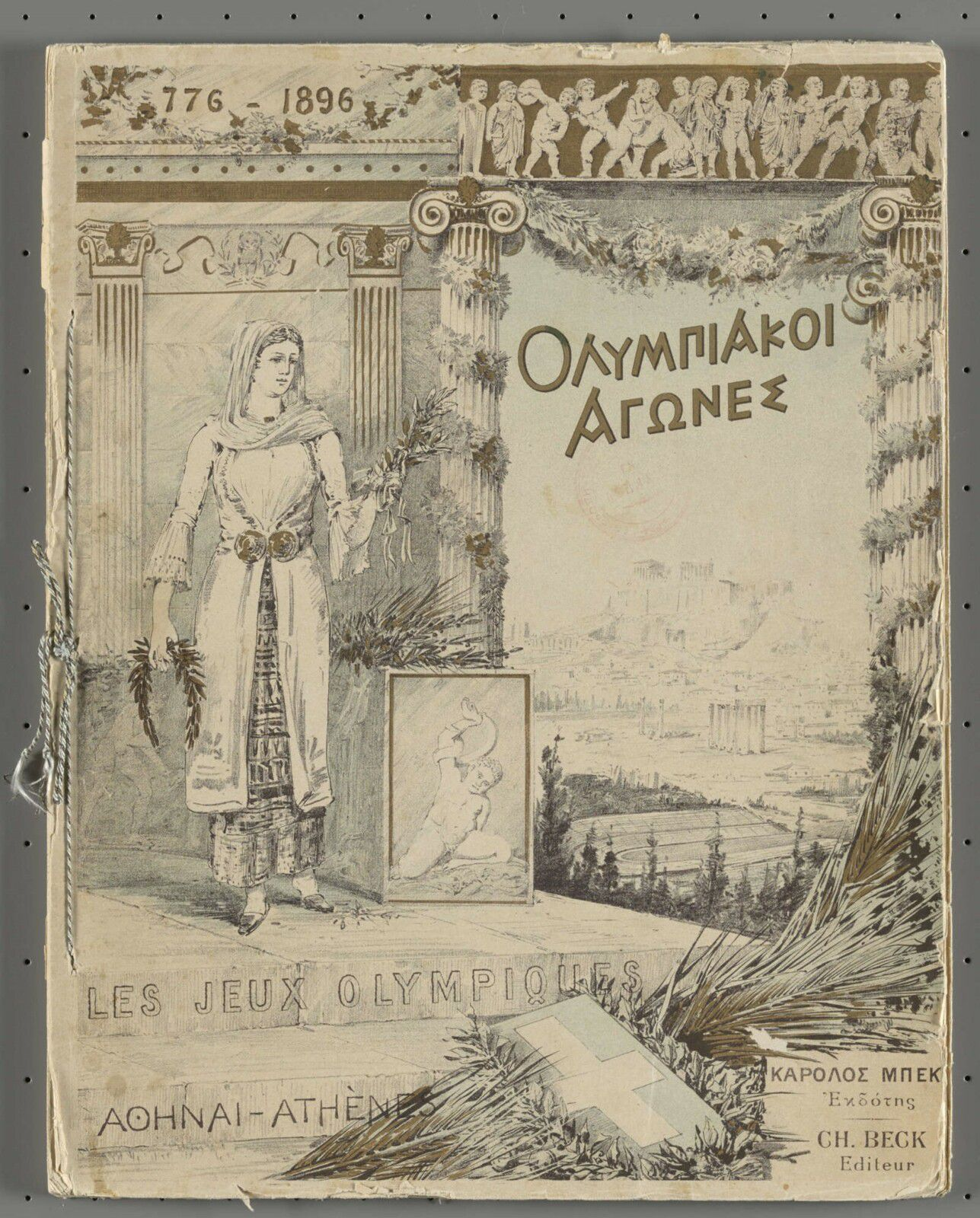
- Cover of the official report for the 1896 Summer Olympics
- Location: Athens, Greece
- Nations: 14^{[note1]}
- Athletes: 241 (all men)^{[note2]}
- Events: 43 in 9 sports (10 disciplines)
- Opening: Gregorian Calendar: 6 April 1896; Julian Calendar: 25 March 1896
- Closing: Gregorian Calendar: 15 April 1896; Julian Calendar: 3 April 1896
- Opened by: King George I
- Stadium: Panathenaic Stadium

The 1896 Summer Olympics, officially known as the Games of the I Olympiad, and commonly known as Athens 1896 (Greek: Αθήνα 1896), were the first international Olympic Games held in modern history. Organised by the International Olympic Committee (IOC), which had been created by French aristocrat Pierre de Coubertin, the event was held in Athens, Greece, from 6 to 15 April 1896.

Fourteen nations (according to the IOC, though the number is subject to interpretation) and 241 athletes (all males; this number is also disputed) took part in the games. Participants were all European or living in Europe, with the exception of the United States team, and over 65% of the competing athletes were Greek. Winners were given a silver medal, while runners-up received a copper medal. Retroactively, the IOC has designated the top three finishers in each event as gold, silver, and bronze medalists. Ten of the 14 participating nations earned medals. On April 6, 1896, American James Connolly became the first Olympic medalist in more than 1,500 years, competing in the triple jump. The United States won the most gold medals, 11, while host nation Greece won the most medals overall, 47. The highlight for the Greeks was the marathon victory by their compatriot Spyridon Louis. The most successful competitor was German wrestler and gymnast Carl Schuhmann, who won four events.

Athens had been chosen to stage the inaugural modern Games during a congress organised by Coubertin in Paris on 23 June 1894, during which the IOC was also created. The main venue was the Panathenaic Stadium, where athletics and wrestling took place; other venues included the Neo Phaliron Velodrome for cycling and the Zappeion for fencing. The opening ceremony was held in the Panathenaic Stadium on 6 April, during which most of the competing athletes were aligned on the infield, grouped by nation. After a speech by the president of the organising committee, Crown Prince Constantine, his father officially opened the Games. Afterwards, nine bands and 150 choir singers performed an Olympic Hymn, composed by Spyridon Samaras and written by Kostis Palamas.

The 1896 Olympics were regarded as a great success. The Games had the largest international participation of any sporting event to that date. The Panathenaic Stadium overflowed with the largest crowd ever to watch a sporting event. After the Games, Coubertin and the IOC were petitioned by several prominent figures, including Greece's King George and some of the American competitors in Athens, to hold all the following Games in Athens. However, the 1900 Summer Olympics were already planned for Paris, and, with the exception of the Intercalated Games of 1906, the Olympics did not return to Greece until the 2004 Summer Olympics, 108 years later.

== Reviving the Games ==
During the 19th century, several small-scale sports festivals across Europe were named after the ancient Olympic Games. The 1870 Olympics at the Panathenaic stadium, which had been refurbished for the occasion, had an audience of 30,000 people. Pierre de Coubertin, a French pedagogue and historian, adopted William Penny Brookes's idea to establish a multi-national and multi-sport event (even though the ancient games only allowed male athletes of Greek origin to participate). In 1890, Coubertin wrote an article in La Revue Athlétique, which espoused the importance of Much Wenlock, a rural market town in the English county of Shropshire. It was here that, in October 1850, the local physician William Penny Brookes founded the Wenlock Olympian Games, a festival of sports and recreations that included athletics and team sports like cricket, football and quoits.

Coubertin also took inspiration from earlier Greek games organised under the name of Olympics by businessman and philanthropist Evangelis Zappas in 1859, 1870 and 1875. The 1896 Athens Games were funded by the legacies of Zappas and his cousin Konstantinos Zappas and by George Averoff who had been requested by the Greek government to sponsor the second refurbishment of the Panathenaic Stadium. The Greek government did this despite the cost of refurbishing the stadium in marble already being funded in full by Evangelis Zappas forty years earlier.

On 18 June 1894, Coubertin organised a congress at the Sorbonne, Paris, to present his plans to representatives of sports societies from 11 countries. Following his proposal's acceptance by the congress, a date for the first modern Olympic Games was discussed; Coubertin suggested that the Games be held concurrently with the 1900 Universal Exposition of Paris. Concerned that a six-year waiting period might lessen public interest, Congress members opted to hold the inaugural Games in 1896.

With a date established, members of the congress discussed the selection of a host city. It is unknown how Athens was chosen: Coubertin and Demetrius Vikelas's descriptions of the selection process contradicted the congress's official minutes. Most accounts state that several congressmen first proposed London, but Coubertin dissented. After a brief discussion with Vikelas, who represented Greece, Coubertin suggested Athens. Vikelas made the Athens proposal official on 23 June; since Greece had been the original home of the Olympics, the congress unanimously approved the decision. Vikelas was then elected the first president of the newly established International Olympic Committee (IOC).

== Organization ==
The return of the Olympic Games to Greece was well-received by the Greek public, media, and royal family. The Crown Prince conferred their patronage on the games. However, the country had financial troubles and was in political turmoil. The country's prime minister frequently alternated between Charilaos Trikoupis and Theodoros Deligiannis during the last years of the 19th century. This instability caused Trikoupis and Stephanos Dragoumis, the president of the Zappas Olympic Committee, which had attempted to organise a series of national Olympiads, to believe that Greece could not host the event. In late 1894, the organising committee under Stephanos Skouloudis presented a report that the cost of the Games would be three times higher than originally estimated by Coubertin. They concluded the Games could not be held and offered their resignation. The total cost of the Games was 3,740,000 gold drachmas (equivalent to €37,417,000 in 2025).

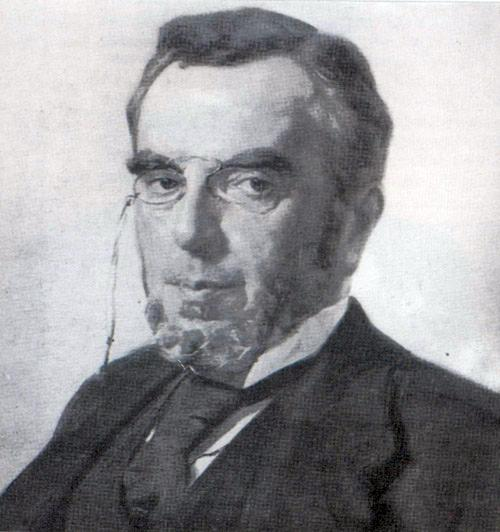
Demetrius Vikelas, the first president of the International Olympic Committee, was credited with the successful organisation of the 1896 Games

With the prospect of reviving the Olympic Games in doubt, Coubertin and Vikelas commenced a campaign to increase the Olympic movement's popularity. On 7 January 1895, Vikelas announced that Crown Prince Constantine would assume the presidency of the organising committee. His first responsibility was to raise the funds necessary to host the Games. He relied on the patriotism of the Greek people to motivate them to provide the required finances. Constantine's enthusiasm increased contributions from the Greek public, raising 330,000 drachmas (equivalent to €3,246,000 in 2025). A special set of postage stamps was commissioned; the sale of which raised 400,000 drachmas (equivalent to €3,935,000 in 2025). Ticket sales added 200,000 drachmas (equivalent to €1,967,000 in 2025). At the request of Constantine, businessman George Averoff agreed to pay for the restoration of the Panathenaic Stadium. Averoff would donate 920,000 drachmas (equivalent to €9,050,000 in 2025) to this project. As a tribute to his generosity, a statue of Averoff was constructed and unveiled on 5 April 1896 outside the stadium.

The IOC's first regulation, voted on in 1894, was to allow only amateur athletes to participate in the Olympic Games. The various contests were thus held under amateur regulations, except for fencing matches. The rules and regulations were not uniform, so the Organising Committee chose among the codes of the various national athletic associations. The jury, the referees and the game director bore the same names as in antiquity (Ephor, Helanodic and Alitarc). Prince George acted as final referee; according to Coubertin, "his presence gave weight and authority to the decisions of the ephors". Women could not compete at the 1896 Summer Olympics because Coubertin felt that their inclusion would be "impractical, uninteresting, unaesthetic and incorrect".

== Venues ==
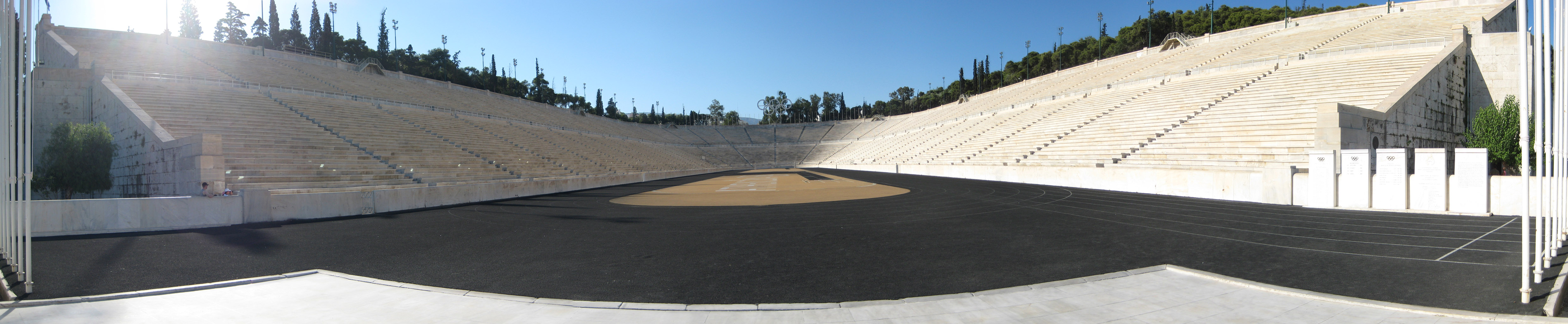
Panorama of the Panathenaic Stadium

Seven venues were used for the 1896 Summer Olympics. Panathenaic Stadium was the main venue, hosting four of the nine sports contested. The town of Marathon hosted the marathon event and the individual road race events. Fencing was held at the Zappeion, sport shooting at Kallithea, and tennis at the Athens Lawn Tennis Club. Swimming was held in the Bay of Zea; it was selected because the organizers of the Games wanted to avoid spending money on constructing a special-purpose swimming venue.

Four of the 1896 venues were reused as competition venues for the 2004 Games. The velodrome would be renovated into a football stadium in the 1960s and was known as Karaiskakis Stadium. This venue was renovated in 2003 for use as a football venue for the 2004 Games. During the 2004 Games, Panathinaiko Stadium hosted the archery competitions and was the finish line for the athletic marathon event. The city of Marathon itself served as the starting point for both marathon events during the 2004 Games. The Zappeion served as the first home of the organizing committee (ATHOC) for the 2004 Games from 1998 to 1999, and served as the press center for non-accredited media during those Games.

Venue	Sports	Capacity	Ref.
Athens Lawn Tennis Club	Tennis	Not listed.	
Bay of Zea	Swimming	Not listed.	
Kallithea	Shooting	Not listed.	
Marathon (city)	Athletics (Marathon), Cycling (Individual road race).	Not listed.	
Neo Phaliron Velodrome	Cycling (track)	Not listed.	
Panathinaiko Stadium	Athletics, Gymnastics, Weightlifting, and Wrestling	80,000	
Zappeion	Fencing	Not listed.	

== Calendar ==
OC	Opening ceremony	●	Event competitions	1	Event finals	CC	Closing ceremony

April 1896		6th Mon	7th Tue	8th Wed	9th Thu	10th Fri	11th Sat	12th Sun	13th Mon	14th Tue	15th Wed	Events
Ceremonies		OC									CC	—N/a
Athletics		2	4		1	5						12
Cycling	Road cycling							1				6
Cycling	Track cycling			1			3		1			6
Fencing			2		1							3
Gymnastics					6	2						8
Shooting				●	1	1	2	1				5
Swimming							4					4
Tennis				●	●	●	2					2
Weightlifting			2									2
Wrestling						●	1					1
Daily final events		2	8	1	9	8	12	2	1	0	0	43
Cumulative total		2	10	11	20	28	40	42	43	43	43	43
April 1896		6th Mon	7th Tue	8th Wed	9th Thu	10th Fri	11th Sat	12th Sun	13th Mon	14th Tue	15th Wed	Total events

Note: Silver medals were awarded to the winners, with copper medals given to the runners-up, and no prizes were given to those who came in 3rd place in any events.

== Opening ceremony ==
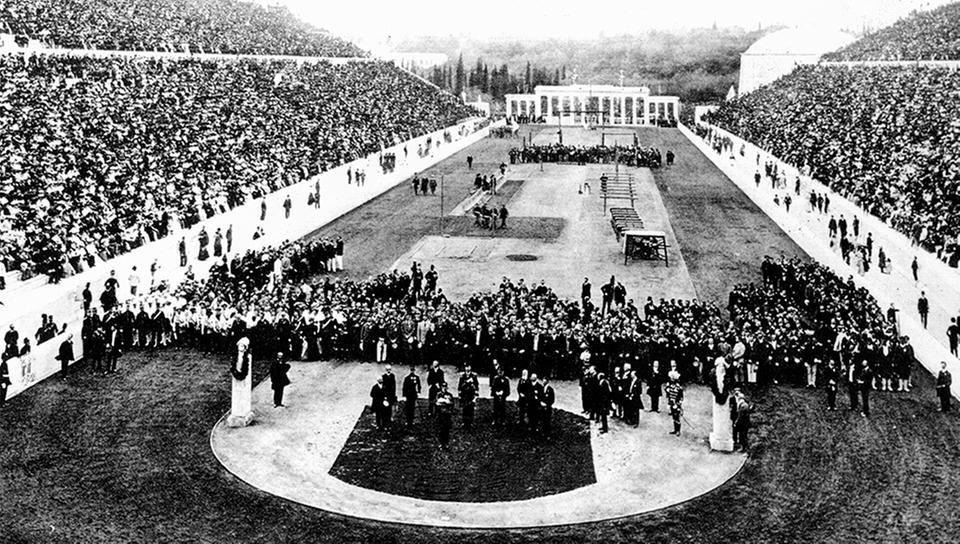
The opening ceremony in the Panathenaic Stadium

On Easter Monday 6 April (25 March according to the Julian calendar used in Greece until 1923) the games of the First Olympiad were officially opened. The Panathenaic Stadium was filled with between 16,000 and 80,000 spectators, including King George I of Greece, his wife Olga, and other members of the royal family. Most of the competing athletes were aligned on the infield, grouped by nation. After a speech by the president of the organising committee, Crown Prince Constantine, his father officially opened the Games with the words:

"I declare the opening of the first international Olympic Games in Athens. Long live the Nation. Long live the Greek people."

Afterwards, nine bands and 150 choir singers performed an Olympic Hymn, composed by Spyridon Samaras, with words by poet Kostis Palamas.

== Events ==
The first announcements regarding the sporting events to be held featured sports like equestrian and cricket, but these plans were not finalised, and these sports did not make the final program for the Games. Football is sometimes listed as having been an exhibition or demonstration sport, although whether a football match actually occurred is disputed. Rowing and sailing events were cancelled on the planned days of competition: sailing due to a lack of special boats in Greece and no foreign entries, and rowing due to poor weather.

The 1896 Summer Olympics programme featured 9 sports encompassing 10 disciplines and 43 events. The number of events in each discipline is noted in parentheses.

- Athletics (12)
- Cycling
  - Road (1)
  - Track (5)
- Fencing (3)
- Gymnastics (8)
- Shooting (5)
- Swimming (4)
- Tennis (2)
- Weightlifting (2)
- Wrestling (1)

=== Athletics ===
The athletics events had the most international field of any of the sports. The major highlight was the marathon, held for the first time in international competition. Spyridon Louis, a previously unrecognised water carrier, won the event to become the only Greek athletics champion and a national hero. Although Greece had been favoured to win the discus and the shot put, the best Greek athletes finished second to American Robert Garrett in both events.

No world records were set, as few top international competitors had elected to compete and the curves of the track were very tight, making fast times in the running events virtually impossible. Thomas Burke of the United States won the 100-meter race in 12.0 seconds and the 400-meter race in 54.2 seconds. Burke was the only one who used the "crouch start" (putting his knee on soil), confusing the jury.

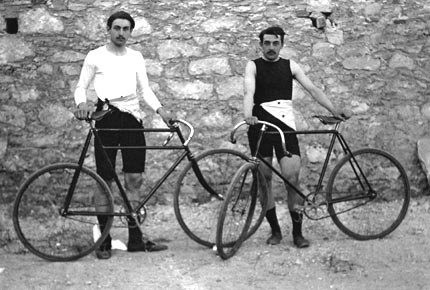
Frenchmen Léon Flameng (left) and Paul Masson won four cycling events

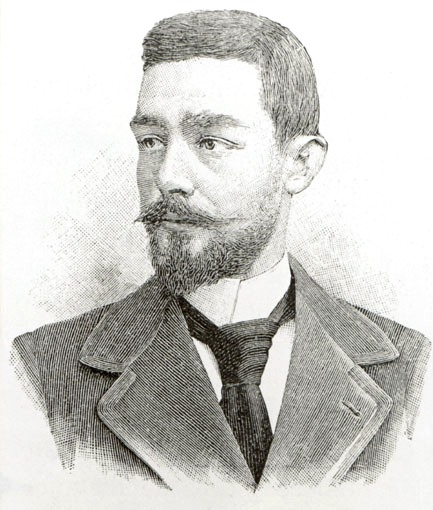
Fencer Leonidas Pyrgos became the first Greek modern Olympic champion by winning the masters foil competition

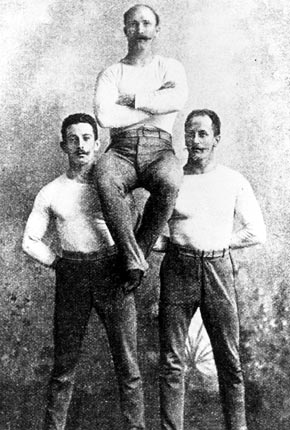
The German individual gymnastics champions: Schuhmann, Flatow, and Weingärtner

Chile claims one athlete, Luis Subercaseaux, who competed for the nation at the 1896 Summer Olympics. Subercaseaux's results are not listed in the official report, though that report typically includes only winners and Subercaseaux won no medals. He was entered to compete in the 100m, 400m and 800m events but is usually listed as a no show. An appraisal of a photo of series 2 of the 100 meters sprint, performed by facial recognition experts of the Chilean forensic police, concluded that Subercaseaux was one of the participants.

The day after the official marathon, Stamata Revithi ran the 40-kilometer course in 5 hours 30 minutes, finishing outside Panathinaiko Stadium. Some authors, who believe that "Melpomene" and Revithi are the same person, attribute to the latter the more favorable time of 4 1/2 hours. She was denied entry into the official race as the 1896 Olympics excluded women from competition.

=== Cycling ===
The cycling competitions used the rules of the International Cycling Association. The newly built Neo Phaliron Velodrome hosted the track cycling events. Only one road event was held, a race from Athens to Marathon and back (87 kilometres).

In the track events, the best cyclist was Frenchman Paul Masson, who won the one lap time trial, the sprint event, and the 10,000 meters. In the 100 kilometres event, Masson entered as a pacemaker for his compatriot Léon Flameng. Flameng won the event, after a fall and after stopping to wait for his Greek opponent Georgios Kolettis to fix a mechanical problem. The Austrian fencer Adolf Schmal won the 12-hour race, which was completed by only two cyclists, while the road race event was won by Aristidis Konstantinidis.

=== Fencing ===
The fencing events were held in the Zappeion, which, built with money Evangelis Zappas had given to revive the ancient Olympic Games, had never seen any athletic contests before. Unlike other sports (in which only amateurs were allowed to take part at the Olympics), professionals were authorised to compete in fencing, though in a separate event. These masters professionals were considered gentlemen athletes, just like the amateurs.

Four events were scheduled, but the épée event was cancelled for unknown reasons. The foil event was won by a Frenchman, Eugène-Henri Gravelotte, who beat his countryman, Henri Callot, in the final. The other two events were won by Greek fencers: Ioannis Georgiadis won the sabre event, and Leonidas Pyrgos won the masters foil, becoming the first Greek Olympic champion in the modern era.

=== Gymnastics ===
The gymnastics competition was carried out on the infield of the Panathinaiko Stadium. Germany sent an 11-man team, which won five of the eight events, including both team events: in the team event on the horizontal bar, the German team was the only entry.

Three Germans added individual titles: Hermann Weingärtner won the horizontal bar event, Alfred Flatow won the parallel bars, and Carl Schuhmann, who also won the wrestling event, won the vault. Louis Zutter, a Swiss gymnast, won the pommel horse, while Greeks Ioannis Mitropoulos and Nikolaos Andriakopoulos were victorious in the rings and rope climbing events, respectively.

=== Sailing and rowing ===
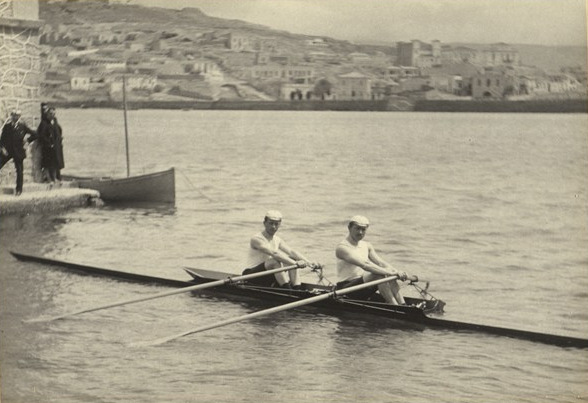
German team at the 1896 Summer Olympics

A regatta of sailing boats was on the program of the Games of the First Olympiad for 31 March 1896 (Julian calendar). The event was cancelled: the official English report blamed a lack of specialty boats had not been provided while the German version also cited a lack of foreign competitors.

Rowing races were scheduled for the next day, 1 April 1896 (Julian). Poor weather caused the event to be postponed to 3 pm and German Berthold Küttner stated that he and Adolf Jäger had lined up for the start of the double sculls, the first event to take place. The event was further postponed to the next day, but the German team still completed the event in the bad weather: they were presented with the winners medal upon the completion of their row. The next day, the event was formally cancelled when the weather worsened. The International Olympic Committee does not recognize Küttner's recollection of the events.

=== Shooting ===
Held at a range at Kallithea, the shooting competition consisted of five events—two using a rifle and three with a pistol. The first event, the military rifle, was won by Pantelis Karasevdas, the only competitor to hit the target with all of his shots. The second event, for military pistols, was dominated by two American brothers: John and Sumner Paine. They became the first siblings to finish first and second in the same event. To avoid embarrassing their hosts, the brothers decided that John would withdraw from the free pistol event. Sumner Paine won that event, becoming the first relative of an Olympic champion to become Olympic champion himself.

The Paine brothers did not compete in the 25-meter pistol event, as the event judges determined that their weapons were not of the required calibre; Ioannis Phrangoudis won the event. The final event, the free rifle, could not be completed due to darkness and was finalised the next morning, with Georgios Orphanidis winning the competition.

=== Swimming ===
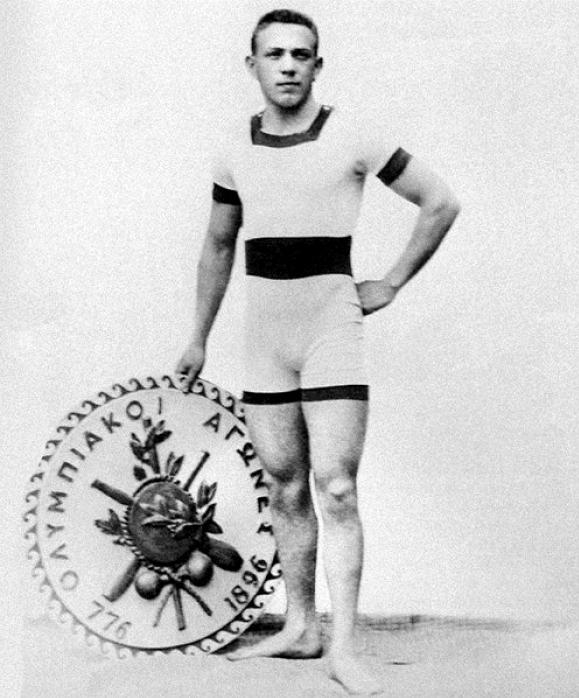
Alfréd Hajós, the first Olympic champion in swimming, is one of only two Olympians to have won medals in both sport and art competitions

The swimming competition was held in the open sea because the organizers had refused to spend the money necessary for a specially constructed stadium. Nearly 20,000 spectators lined the Bay of Zea off the Piraeus coast to watch the events. The water in the bay was cold, and the competitors suffered during their races. There were three open events (men's 100-metre freestyle, men's 500-metre freestyle, and men's 1200 metre freestyle), in addition to a special event open only to Greek sailors, all of which were held on the same day (11 April).

For Alfréd Hajós of Hungary, this meant he could only compete in two of the events, as they were held too close together, which made it impossible for him to adequately recuperate. Nevertheless, he won the two events in which he swam, the 100 and 1200 meter freestyle. Hajós later became one of only two Olympians to win a medal in both the athletic and artistic competitions, when he won a silver medal for architecture in 1924. The 500-meter freestyle was won by Austrian swimmer Paul Neumann, who defeated his opponents by more than a minute and a half.

=== Tennis ===
Although tennis was already a major sport by the end of the 19th century, none of the top players turned up for the tournament in Athens. The competition was held at the courts of the Athens Lawn Tennis Club, and the infield of the velodrome used for the cycling events. John Pius Boland, who won the event, had been entered in the competition by a fellow-student of his at Oxford; the Greek, Konstantinos Manos. As a member of the Athens Lawn Tennis sub-committee, Manos had been trying, with the assistance of Boland, to recruit competitors for the Athens Games from among the sporting circles of Oxford University. In the first round, Boland defeated Friedrich Traun, a promising tennis player from Hamburg, who had been eliminated in the 100-meter sprint competition. Boland and Traun decided to team up for the doubles event, in which they reached the final and defeated their Greek opponents after losing the first set.

=== Weightlifting ===
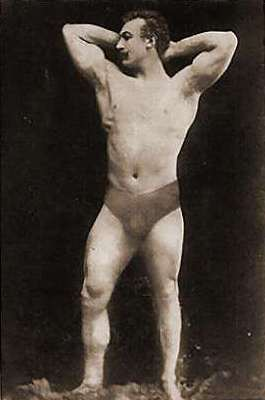
Launceston Elliot, winner of the one-armed weightlifting event, was popular with the Greek audience, who found him very handsome

The sport of weightlifting was still young in 1896, and the rules differed from those in use today. Competitions were held outdoors, in the infield of the main stadium, and there were no weight limits. The first event was similar in style to what is now known as the "clean and jerk". Two competitors stood out: Briton Launceston Elliot and Viggo Jensen of Denmark. Both of them lifted the same weight, but the jury, with Prince George as the chairman, ruled that Jensen had done so in a better style. The British delegation, unfamiliar with this tie-breaking rule, lodged a protest. The lifters were eventually allowed to make further attempts, but neither lifter improved, and Jensen was declared the champion.

Elliot got his revenge in the one hand lift event, which was held immediately after the two-handed one. Jensen had been slightly injured during his last two-handed attempt and was no match for Elliot, who won the competition easily. The Greek audience was charmed by the British victor, whom they considered very attractive. A curious incident occurred during the weightlifting event: a servant was ordered to remove the weights, which appeared to be a difficult task for him. Prince George came to his assistance; he picked up the weight and threw it a considerable distance with ease, to the delight of the crowd.

=== Wrestling ===
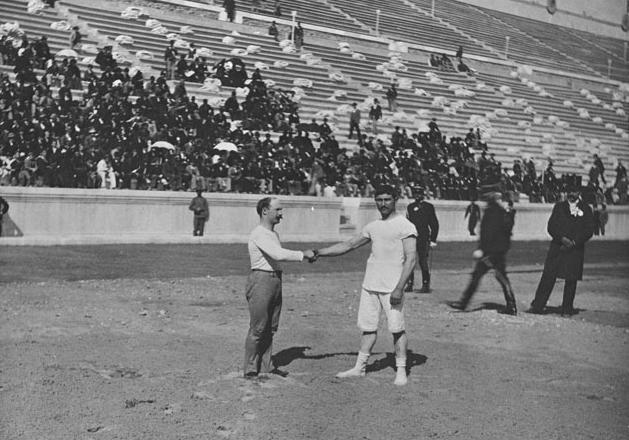
Carl Schuhmann (left) and Georgios Tsitas shake hands before the final match of the wrestling competition

No weight classes existed for the wrestling competition, held in the Panathenaic Stadium, which meant that there would only be one winner among competitors of all sizes. The rules used were similar to modern Greco-Roman wrestling, although there was no time limit, and not all leg holds were forbidden (in contrast to current rules).

Apart from the two Greek contestants, all the competitors had previously been active in other sports. Weightlifting champion Launceston Elliot faced gymnastics champion Carl Schuhmann. The latter won and advanced into the final, where he met Georgios Tsitas, who had previously defeated Stephanos Christopoulos. Darkness forced the final match to be suspended after 40 minutes; it was continued the following day, when Schuhmann needed only fifteen minutes to finish the bout.

== Closing ceremony ==
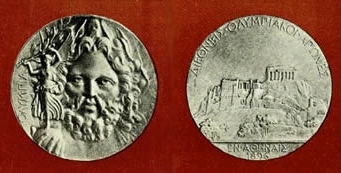
A silver medal was awarded to the winner of each event. The current system of gold, silver, and bronze medals was not implemented until the 1906 Olympic Games.

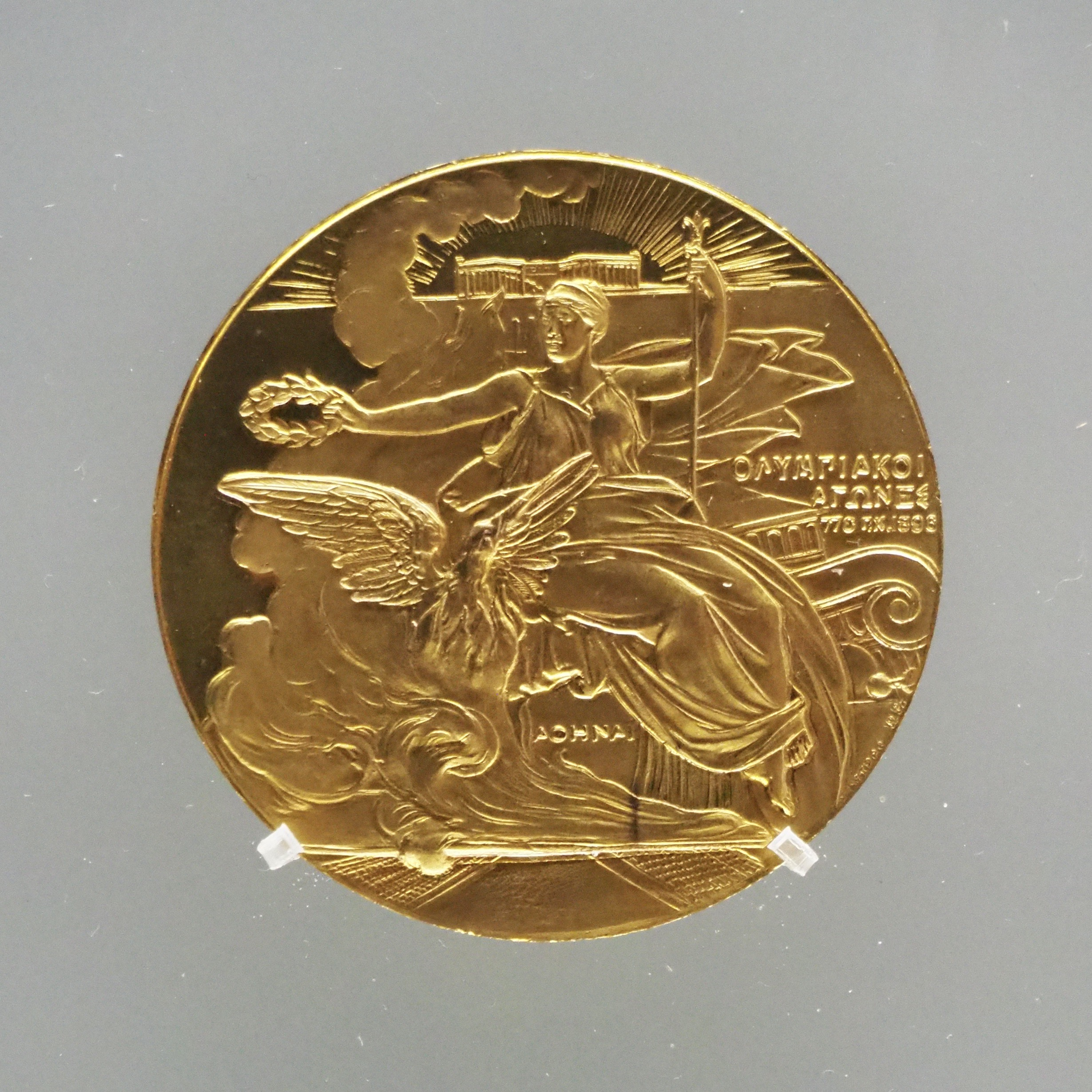
Commemorative medal awarded to participants.

On the morning of Sunday 12 April (or 31 March, according to the Julian calendar then used in Greece), King George organised a banquet for officials and athletes (even though some competitions had not yet been held). During his speech, he made clear that, as far as he was concerned, the Olympics should be held in Athens permanently. The official closing ceremony was held the following Wednesday after being postponed from Tuesday due to rain. Again, the royal family attended the ceremony, which was opened by the national anthem of Greece and an ode composed in ancient Greek by George S. Robertson, a British athlete and scholar.

Afterwards, the king awarded prizes to the winners. Unlike today, the first-place winners received a silver medal, an olive branch and a diploma, while runners-up received a copper medal, a laurel branch and a diploma. Third place winners did not receive a prize.

Some winners also received additional prizes. Spyridon Louis received a cup from Michel Bréal, a friend of Coubertin, who had conceived the marathon event. Louis then led the medalists on a lap of honour around the stadium, while the Olympic Hymn was played again. The King then formally announced that the first Olympiad was at an end and left the Stadium, while the band played the Greek national hymn and the crowd cheered.

Like the Greek king, many others supported the idea of holding the next Games in Athens; most of the American competitors signed a letter to the Crown Prince expressing this wish. Coubertin, however, was heavily opposed to this idea, as he envisioned international rotation as one of the cornerstones of the modern Olympics. According to his wish, the next Games were held in Paris, although they would be somewhat overshadowed by the concurrent Universal Exposition.

== Participating nations ==
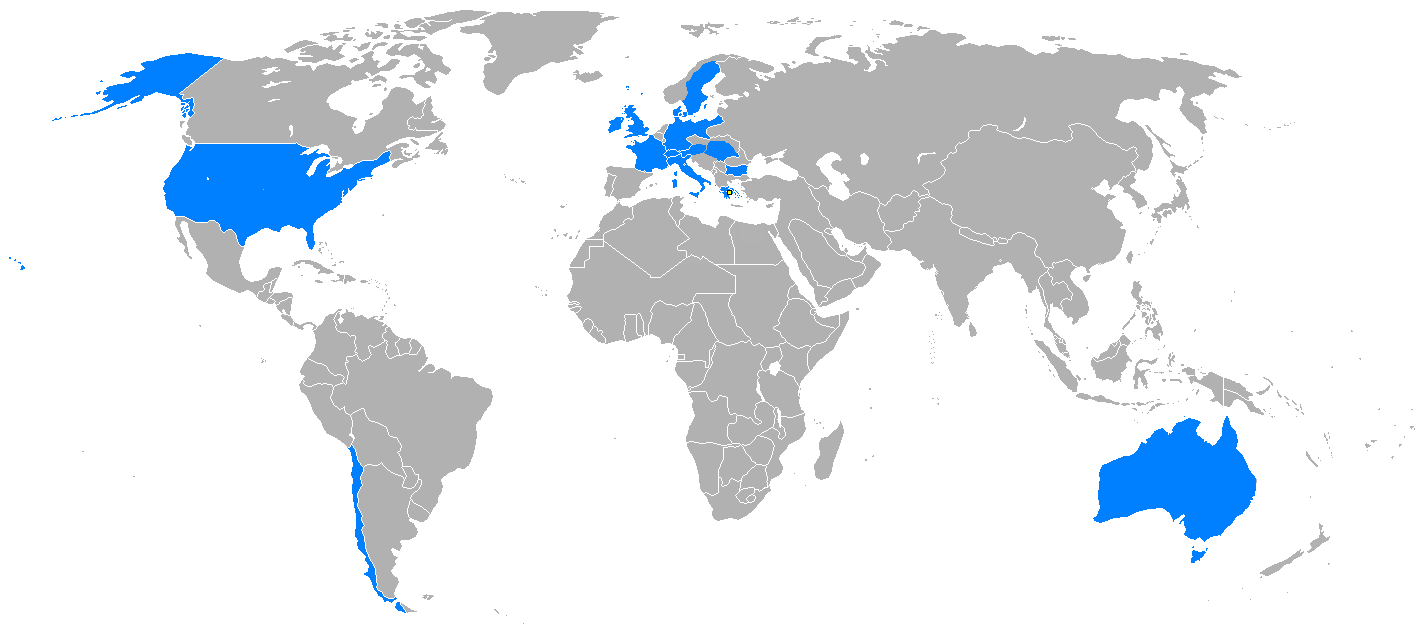
Participating countries

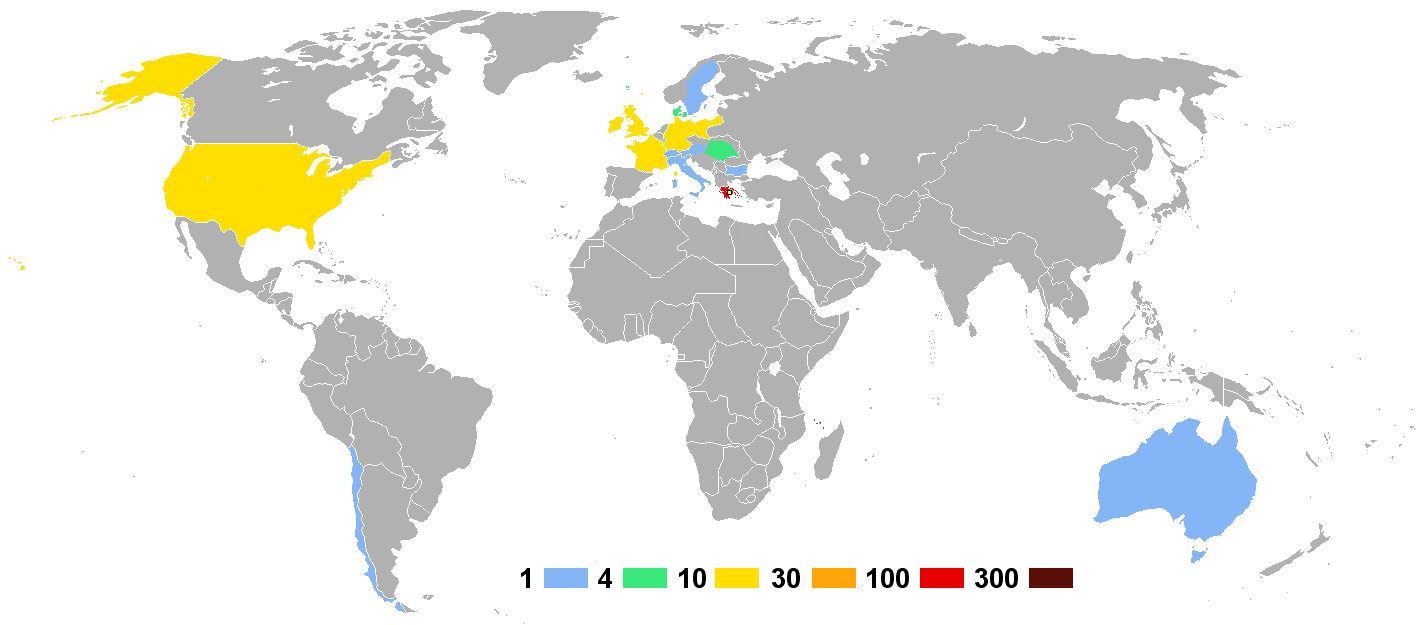
Number of athletes from each country

The concept of national teams was not a major part of the Olympic movement until the Intercalated Games 10 years later, though many sources list the nationality of competitors in 1896 and give medal counts. There are significant conflicts with regard to which nations competed. The International Olympic Committee gives a figure of 14, but does not list them. Different sources provide differing lists of nations; some exclude countries like Chile and Bulgaria, but the IOC lists competitors from both countries. Egypt is also sometimes included due to the participation of Dimitrios Kasdaglis; however, the IOC classifies him as a Greek athlete. Belgium and Russia had entered the names of competitors, but no athletes from these countries competed.

Participating Nations
- Australia (1) – Prior to 1901 Australia was not a unified nation but six separately administered British colonies, but the results of Edwin Flack are typically given with him listed as Australian. This is a modern convention, as he was contemporaneously considered a British athlete. The concept of "national teams" chosen by National Olympic Committees did not exist at this point in time.
- Austria (3)
- Bulgaria (1) – The Bulgarian Olympic Committee claims that gymnast Charles Champaud was competing as a Bulgarian. Champaud was a Swiss national living in Bulgaria. Mallon lists Champaud as Swiss. Olympedia listed him as a member of the Bulgarian team of Swiss nationality.
- Chile (1) – The Chilean Olympic Committee claims to have had one athlete, Luis Subercaseaux, compete in the 100, 400, and 800-meter races in the athletics programme. If so, he was 13 years old at the Olympics. No further details are given, and no mention is made of Subercaseaux in de Wael, or the Official Report. Olympedia claims that he was entered to compete in the 100m, 400m and 800m events but did not start.
- Denmark (3)
- France (12)
- Germany (19)
- Great Britain (10) Tennis champion John Boland became a prominent Irish nationalist; his daughter Bridget later claimed that he had objected when the Union Jack was raised to mark his doubles triumph, pointing out that Ireland had its own green harp flag, following which the organisers apologised and agreed to prepare an Irish flag. While historian Kevin MacCarthy is sceptical of this story, by 1906, Boland was crediting his medals to Ireland. On the IOC website, his singles gold is credited to Great Britain.
- Greece (169) – Greek results typically include the results of competitors from Cyprus, Smyrna and Egypt. Some sources give Cypriot results separately, though most count Anastasios Andreou, a Greek-Cypriot and the only athlete from Cyprus, as Greek (Cyprus was a protectorate of the United Kingdom at the time). Kasdaglis, an athlete of Greek origins living in Alexandria, Egypt, is listed by the IOC as Greek during both his competition in the singles tennis competition and the doubles tennis competition along with his teammate, the Greek athlete Demetrios Petrokokkinos.
- Hungary (7)
- Italy (1) – The most prominent Italian involved with the games, Carlo Airoldi, was deemed a professional and excluded from competition. However, the shooter Giuseppe Rivabella was also Italian and did compete.
- Sweden (1)
- Switzerland (3)
- United States (14)
- Mixed team (4) – Tennis doubles teams could consist of players from different countries; the IOC labels these Mixed Teams.

=== Number of athletes by National Olympic Committees ===
National Olympic Committees did not yet exist. Over 65% of all athletes were Greek.

Country	Athletes
Greece	169
Germany	19
United States	14
France	12
Great Britain	10
Hungary	7
Austria	3
Denmark	3
Switzerland	2/3
Australia	1
Italy	1
Chile	1
Sweden	1
Bulgaria	0/1
Total	243

== Medal count ==
Ten of the fourteen participating nations earned medals, in addition to two medals won by mixed teams (teams made up of athletes from multiple nations). The IOC has retroactively assigned gold, silver and bronze medals to the three best placed athletes in each event to comport with more recent traditions. In this regard, five of the bronze medalists at the Games are unknown: two in swimming and three in gymnastics.

The United States won the most gold medals (11), while host nation Greece won the most medals overall (47), as well as the most silver (18) and bronze (19) medals, finishing with one fewer gold medal than the United States.

* Host nation (Greece)

1896 Summer Olympics medal table
Rank	Nation	Gold	Silver	Bronze	Total
1	United States	11	7	2	20
2	Greece*	10	18	19	47
3	Germany	6	5	2	13
4	France	5	4	2	11
5	Great Britain	2	3	2	7
6	Hungary	2	1	3	6
7	Austria	2	1	2	5
8	Australia	2	0	0	2
9	Denmark	1	2	3	6
10	Switzerland	1	2	0	3
11	Mixed team	1	0	1	2
Totals (11 entries)		43	43	36	122

=== Podium sweeps ===
Date	Sport	Event	NOC	Gold	Silver	Bronze
7 April	Athletics	Men's long jump	United States	Ellery Clark	Robert Garrett	James Connolly
9 April	Shooting	Men's 200-metre military rifle	Greece	Pantelis Karasevdas	Pavlos Pavlidis	Nicolaos Trikupis
10 April	Athletics	Men's high jump	United States	Ellery Clark	Robert Garrett; James Connolly	Not awarded
11 April	Swimming	Men's sailors 100-metre freestyle	Greece	Ioannis Malokinis	Spyridon Chazapis	Dimitrios Drivas

== Notes ==
- The number of countries, given by the International Olympic Committee, is open to interpretation and could be between 10 and 15. There are numerous reasons for the disparity: national teams hardly existed at the time, with most athletes representing themselves or their clubs, and countries were not always as well-defined as they are today. The number of countries here reflects the number used by most modern sources, including the International Olympic Committee website. See the relevant section for further details.
- The number of competitors given according to the International Olympic Committee. Mallon & Widlund give a total of 245 athletes, while De Wael gives 246. The identities of 179 athletes at the Games are known.

== Bibliography ==
- Bijkerk, Anthony T. (2004). "Pierre de Coubertin". In John E. Findling, Kimberly D. Pelle (ed.). Encyclopedia of the Modern Olympic Movement. Greenwood Publishing Group. ISBN 0-313-32278-3. OCLC 52418065.
- Coubertin, Pierre De (November 1896). "The Olympic Games of 1896". The Century Magazine. Vol. LIII, no. 1.
- Coubertin, Pierre De; Philemon, Timoleon J.; Politis, N.G.; Anninos, Charalambos (1897). "The Olympic Games in 1896 – Second Part". The Olympic Games: BC 776 – AD 1896 (PDF). Athens: Charles Beck. Archived from the original (PDF) on 27 May 2008.
- Darling, Janina K. (2004). "Panathenaic Stadium, Athens". Architecture of Greece. Greenwood Publishing Group. ISBN 0-313-32152-3. OCLC 54500822.
- DeChano-Cook, Lisa M.; Shelley, Fred M. (2024). Brunn, Stanley D. (ed.). Geography of Time, Place, Movement and Networks, Volume 5: Mapping Women and Family Journeys. Springer Publishing. ISBN 978-3031580406.
- Gillmeister, Heiner (1998). Tennis: a Cultural History (PDF). Continuum International Publishing Group. ISBN 0-7185-0195-0. OCLC 67496016.
- Gillmeister, Heiner (Winter 1995). "Olympic Tennis: Some Afterthoughts" (PDF). Citius, Altius, Fortius. 3 (1): 23–25. Archived from the original (PDF) on 24 January 2012.
- Gordon, Harry (1994). Australia and the Olympic Games. University of Queensland Press. ISBN 978-0702226274.
- Guttmann, Allen (1994). Games and Empires: Modern Sports and Cultural Imperialism. Columbia University Press. ISBN 0-231-10042-6. OCLC 231638134.
- Lennartz, Karl; Wassong, Stephen (2004). "Athens 1896". In John E. Findling, Kimberly D. Pelle (ed.). Encyclopedia of the Modern Olympic Movement. Greenwood Publishing Group. ISBN 0-313-32278-3. OCLC 52418065.
- MacCarthy, Kevin (2010). Gold, Silver and Green: The Irish Olympic Journey 1896-1924. Cork University Press. ISBN 9781859184585.
- Malanski, Daniel (2025). Olympic Opening Ceremonies: Memory and Modernity. Routledge. ISBN 9781032940618.
- Mallon, Bill; Widlund, Ture (1998). The 1896 Olympic Games: Results for All Competitors in All Events, With Commentary. Jefferson, North Carolina: McFarland & Company. ISBN 978-0-7864-4065-8.
- Martin, David E.; Gynn, Roger W. H. (2000). "The Olympic Marathon". Running through the Ages. Human Kinetics. ISBN 0-88011-969-1. OCLC 42823784.
- Matthews, George R. (2005). "The Ghost of Plato". America's First Olympics: The St. Louis Games Of 1904. University of Missouri Press. ISBN 0-8262-1588-2. OCLC 58468164.
- McGehee, Richard V. (2000). "The Impact of Imported Sports on the Popular Culture of Nineteenth- and Early Twentieth-Century Mexico and Central America". In Ingrid Elizabeth Fey, Karen Racine (ed.). Strange Pilgrimages: Exile, Travel, and National Identity in Latin America (PDF). Rowman & Littlefield. ISBN 0-8420-2694-0. OCLC 237382448. Archived from the original (PDF) on 27 May 2008.
- Official Report of the XVIII Olympiad, v.2 (2005). "Volume 2". LA84 Foundation Digital Library.
- "Professionals and Amateurs". From Ancient Olympia to Athens of 1896. Foundation of the Hellenic World.
- Sears, Edward S. (2001). "The Revival of the Olympic Games". Running through the Ages. McFarland. ISBN 0-7864-0971-1. OCLC 46650949.
- Toohey, Kristine (2007). The Olympic Games: A Social Sciences Perspective. CABI. ISBN 978-1-84593-355-5.
- Wallechinsky, David; Loucky, Jaime (2008). The Complete Book of the Olympics: 2008 Edition. London: Aurum Press Limited. ISBN 978-0140066326.
- Young, David C. (2004). "The Modern Olympic Games". A Brief History of the Olympic Games. Oxford: Blackwell. ISBN 1-4051-1130-5. OCLC 54111254.
- Young, David C. (1996). The Modern Olympics: A Struggle for Revival. Baltimore, Maryland: Johns Hopkins University Press. ISBN 0-8018-7207-3.

Summer Olympics
Preceded by Zappas Olympics	I Olympiad; Athens; 1896	Succeeded by Paris
