= Greece at the Olympics =

- IOC code: GRE
- NOC: Hellenic Olympic Committee
- Website: www.hoc.gr (in Greek and English)
- Medals Ranked 35th: Gold 36 Silver 46 Bronze 47 Total 129

Summer appearances
- 1896; 1900; 1904; 1908; 1912; 1920; 1924; 1928; 1932; 1936; 1948; 1952; 1956; 1960; 1964; 1968; 1972; 1976; 1980; 1984; 1988; 1992; 1996; 2000; 2004; 2008; 2012; 2016; 2020; 2024; 2028

Winter appearances
- 1936; 1948; 1952; 1956; 1960; 1964; 1968; 1972; 1976; 1980; 1984; 1988; 1992; 1994; 1998; 2002; 2006; 2010; 2014; 2018; 2022; 2026

Other related appearances
- 1906 Intercalated Games

Greece has competed at every Summer Olympic Games, one of five countries to have done so, and most of the Winter Olympic Games. Greece has hosted the modern Olympic Games twice, both in Athens for the Summer Olympic Games, in 1896 and 2004.

In recognition as the birthplace of the Ancient Olympic Games, Greece always enters the stadium first to lead the Parade of Nations at the opening ceremony, with the notable exceptions of 1924, 1928, 1932, and 1960 when Greece did not participate and 2004 when Greece entered last as the host nation. (Note: In the 2004 Summer Olympics opening ceremony, the Greek flag-bearer entered first, honoring the traditional role of Greece in the Parade of Nations, while the whole Greek delegation entered last as the host nation.) Before each Games, the Olympic Flame is lit in Olympia, the site of the Ancient Olympic Games, in a ceremony that reflects ancient Greek rituals and initiates the Olympic torch relay. The flag of Greece is always hoisted in the closing ceremony, along with the flags of the current and the next host country.

Greek athletes have won a total of 129 medals in 15 different sports and the country currently ranks 36th in the all-time Summer Olympics medal count. Athletics and weightlifting have been the top medal-producing sports for the nation and in the latter Greece is placed among the top 10 countries overall. Gymnastics, shooting and wrestling are the other sports that have produced ten or more medals for Greece. In the inaugural 1896 Olympics, Greece finished second in the gold medals count, but won the most medals in total, in their best Olympic performance. Greece finished third in the 1906 Intercalated Games with 8 gold, 14 silver and 13 bronze medals (35 in total), which were considered Olympic Games at the time but are not officially recognized by the IOC today.

Greece has not won any medals at the Winter Olympics.

== Hosted Games ==
Greece has hosted the Summer Olympic Games on two occasions, the inaugural modern Olympics in 1896 and again in 2004. Both were held in Athens, which along with Los Angeles and Tokyo are the cities that have hosted the Olympic Games twice, with London and Paris being the only two cities to have hosted them three times.

Games	Host city	Dates	Nations	Participants	Events
1896 Summer Olympics	Athens	6 – 15 April	14	241	43
2004 Summer Olympics	Athens	13 – 29 August	201	10,625	301

Athens also hosted the 1906 Intercalated Games, which at the time were considered to be Olympic Games by the International Olympic Committee.

== Medal tables ==
=== Medals by Summer Games ===
Host country

Games	Athletes	Gold	Silver	Bronze	Total	Rank
(Kingdom of Greece) 1896 Athens	212	10	18	19	47	2
(French Third Republic) 1900 Paris	3	0	0	0	0	–
(United States) 1904 St. Louis	14	1	0	1	2	8
(United Kingdom) 1908 London	20	0	3	1	4	15
(Sweden) 1912 Stockholm	22	1	0	1	2	15
(Belgium) 1920 Antwerp	57	0	1	0	1	19
(French Third Republic) 1924 Paris	39	0 (Note: One gold medal of Greece listed in the IOC website for the 1924 Paris summer Olympics is not about a sport but for an artistic competition (sculpture) won by Konstantinos Dimitriadis.)	0	0	0	–
(Netherlands) 1928 Amsterdam	23	0	0	0	0	–
(United States) 1932 Los Angeles	10	0	0	0	0	–
(Nazi Germany) 1936 Berlin	41	0	0	0	0	–
(United Kingdom) 1948 London	61	0	0	0	0	–
(Finland) 1952 Helsinki	48	0	0	0	0	–
(Australia) 1956 Melbourne	13	0	0	1	1	35
(Italy) 1960 Rome	48	1	0	0	1	21
(Japan) 1964 Tokyo	18	0	0	0	0	–
1968 Mexico City	44	0	0	1	1	42
(West Germany) 1972 Munich	60	0	2	0	2	29
(Canada) 1976 Montreal	41	0	0	0	0	–
(Soviet Union) 1980 Moscow	43	1	0	2	3	22
(United States) 1984 Los Angeles	62	0	1	1	2	30
(South Korea) 1988 Seoul	56	0	0	1	1	46
(Spain) 1992 Barcelona	70	2	0	0	2	26
(United States) 1996 Atlanta	121	4	4	0	8	16
(Australia) 2000 Sydney	140	4	6	3	13	17
(Greece) 2004 Athens	426	6	6	4	16	15
(China) 2008 Beijing	156	0	2	1	3	60
(United Kingdom) 2012 London	103	0	0	2	2	77
(Brazil) 2016 Rio de Janeiro	95	3	1	2	6	25
(Japan) 2020 Tokyo	83	2	1	1	4	36
(France) 2024 Paris	100	1	1	6	8	51
(United States) 2028 Los Angeles	future event					
(Australia) 2032 Brisbane	future event					
Total (30/30)	2,229	36	46	47	129	35

=== Medals by Winter Games ===
Games	Athletes	Gold	Silver	Bronze	Total	Rank
(Nazi Germany) 1936 Garmisch-Partenkirchen	1	0	0	0	0	–
(Switzerland) 1948 St. Moritz	1	0	0	0	0	–
(Norway) 1952 Oslo	3	0	0	0	0	–
(Italy) 1956 Cortina d'Ampezzo	3	0	0	0	0	–
(United States) 1960 Squaw Valley	did not participate					
(Austria) 1964 Innsbruck	3	0	0	0	0	–
(France) 1968 Grenoble	3	0	0	0	0	–
(Japan) 1972 Sapporo	3	0	0	0	0	–
(Austria) 1976 Innsbruck	4	0	0	0	0	–
(United States) 1980 Lake Placid	3	0	0	0	0	–
(Socialist Federal Republic of Yugoslavia) 1984 Sarajevo	6	0	0	0	0	–
(Canada) 1988 Calgary	6	0	0	0	0	–
(France) 1992 Albertville	8	0	0	0	0	–
(Norway) 1994 Lillehammer	9	0	0	0	0	–
(Japan) 1998 Nagano	13	0	0	0	0	–
(United States) 2002 Salt Lake City	10	0	0	0	0	–
(Italy) 2006 Turin	5	0	0	0	0	–
(Canada) 2010 Vancouver	7	0	0	0	0	–
(Russia) 2014 Sochi	7	0	0	0	0	–
(South Korea) 2018 Pyeongchang	4	0	0	0	0	–
(China) 2022 Beijing	5	0	0	0	0	–
(Italy) 2026 Milano Cortina	5	0	0	0	0	–
(France) 2030 French Alps	future event					
(United States) 2034 Utah	future event					
Total (21/25)	109	0	0	0	0	–

=== Medals by summer sport ===
Sport	Gold	Silver	Bronze	Total
Athletics	9	12	11	32
Weightlifting	6	5	4	15
Gymnastics	5	3	5	13
Shooting	4	4	5	13
Sailing	3	2	3	8
Fencing	2	1	2	5
Swimming	1	4	2	7
Wrestling	1	3	8	12
Cycling	1	3	0	4
Taekwondo	1	3	0	4
Rowing	1	1	4	6
Judo	1	0	2	3
Diving	1	0	0	1
Tennis	0	2	1	3
Water polo	0	2	0	2
Marathon swimming	0	1	0	1
Totals (16 entries)	36	46	47	129

== Medal tables by athlete ==
=== List of medalists ===
	Medal	Name(s)	Games	Sport	Event
1	Gold	Spyridon Louis	1896 Athens	Athletics	Men's marathon
2	Gold	Aristidis Konstantinidis	1896 Athens	Cycling	Men's road race
3	Gold	Leonidas Pyrgos	1896 Athens	Fencing	Men's masters foil
4	Gold	Ioannis Georgiadis	1896 Athens	Fencing	Men's sabre
5	Gold	Ioannis Mitropoulos	1896 Athens	Gymnastics	Men's rings
6	Gold	Nikolaos Andriakopoulos	1896 Athens	Gymnastics	Men's rope climbing
7	Gold	Pantelis Karasevdas	1896 Athens	Shooting	Men's 200 m military rifle
8	Gold	Georgios Orphanidis	1896 Athens	Shooting	Men's 300 m free rifle, three positions
9	Gold	Ioannis Frangoudis	1896 Athens	Shooting	Men's 25 m rapid fire pistol
10	Gold	Ioannis Malokinis	1896 Athens	Swimming	Men's sailors 100 m freestyle
11	Silver	Charilaos Vasilakos	1896 Athens	Athletics	Men's marathon
12	Silver	Miltiadis Gouskos	1896 Athens	Athletics	Men's shot put
13	Silver	Panagiotis Paraskevopoulos	1896 Athens	Athletics	Men's discus throw
14	Silver	Stamatios Nikolopoulos	1896 Athens	Cycling	Men's sprint
15	Silver	Stamatios Nikolopoulos	1896 Athens	Cycling	Men's time trial
16	Silver	Georgios Koletis	1896 Athens	Cycling	Men's 100 km
17	Silver	Tilemachos Karakalos	1896 Athens	Fencing	Men's sabre
18	Silver	Thomas Xenakis	1896 Athens	Gymnastics	Men's rope climbing
19	Silver	Panellinios G.S.: Spyridon Athanasopoulos Nikolaos Andriakopoulos Petros Persakis Thomas Xenakis 29 others, names unknown	1896 Athens	Gymnastics	Men's team parallel bars
20	Silver	Panagiotis Pavlidis	1896 Athens	Shooting	Men's 200 m military rifle
21	Silver	Ioannis Frangoudis	1896 Athens	Shooting	Men's 300 m free rifle, three positions
22	Silver	Georgios Orphanidis	1896 Athens	Shooting	Men's 25 m rapid fire pistol
23	Silver	Antonios Pepanos	1896 Athens	Swimming	Men's 500 m freestyle
24	Silver	Ioannis Andreou	1896 Athens	Swimming	Men's 1200 m freestyle
25	Silver	Spyridon Chazapis	1896 Athens	Swimming	Men's sailors 100 m freestyle
26	Silver	Dimitrios Kasdaglis	1896 Athens	Tennis	Men's singles
27	Silver	Dimitrios Kasdaglis - Demetrios Petrokokkinos	1896 Athens	Tennis	Men's doubles
28	Silver	Georgios Tsitas	1896 Athens	Wrestling	Men's Greco-Roman
29	Bronze	Dimitrios Golemis	1896 Athens	Athletics	Men's 800 m
30	Bronze	Evangelos Damaskos	1896 Athens	Athletics	Men's pole vault
31	Bronze	Ioannis Theodoropoulos	1896 Athens	Athletics	Men's pole vault
32	Bronze	Ioannis Persakis	1896 Athens	Athletics	Men's triple jump
33	Bronze	Georgios Papasideris	1896 Athens	Athletics	Men's shot put
34	Bronze	Sotirios Versis	1896 Athens	Athletics	Men's discus throw
35	Bronze	Periklis Pierrakos-Mavromichalis	1896 Athens	Fencing	Men's foil
36	Bronze	Athanasios Vouros	1896 Athens	Fencing	Men's foil
37	Bronze	Petros Persakis	1896 Athens	Gymnastics	Men's rings
38	Bronze	Ethnikos G.S. Athens: Ioannis Chrysafis Ioannis Mitropoulos Dimitrios Loundras Filippos Karvelas 15 others, names unknown	1896 Athens	Gymnastics	Men's team parallel bars
39	Bronze	Nikolaos Trikoupis	1896 Athens	Shooting	Men's 200 m military rifle
40	Bronze	Nikolaos Morakis	1896 Athens	Shooting	Men's 25 m military pistol
41	Bronze	Ioannis Frangoudis	1896 Athens	Shooting	Men's 30 m free pistol
42	Bronze	Efstathios Chorafas	1896 Athens	Swimming	Men's 500 m freestyle
43	Bronze	Dimitrios Drivas	1896 Athens	Swimming	Men's sailors 100 m freestyle
44	Bronze	Konstantinos Paspatis	1896 Athens	Tennis	Men's singles
45	Bronze	Alexandros Nikolopoulos	1896 Athens	Weightlifting	Men's one hand lift
46	Bronze	Sotirios Versis	1896 Athens	Weightlifting	Men's two hand lift
47	Bronze	Stephanos Christopoulos	1896 Athens	Wrestling	Men's Greco-Roman
48	Gold	Periklis Kakousis	1904 St. Louis	Weightlifting	Men's two hand lift
49	Bronze	Nikolaos Georgantas	1904 St. Louis	Athletics	Men's discus throw
50	Silver	Konstantinos Tsiklitiras	1908 London	Athletics	Men's standing high jump
51	Silver	Konstantinos Tsiklitiras	1908 London	Athletics	Men's standing long jump
52	Silver	Michalis Dorizas	1908 London	Athletics	Men's freestyle javelin
53	Bronze	Anastasios Metaxas	1908 London	Shooting	Men's individual trap shooting
54	Gold	Konstantinos Tsiklitiras	1912 Stockholm	Athletics	Men's standing long jump
55	Bronze	Konstantinos Tsiklitiras	1912 Stockholm	Athletics	Men's standing high jump
56	Silver	Georgios Moraitinis; Iason Sappas; Alexandros Theofilakis; Ioannis Theofilakis; Alexandros Vrasivanopoulos	1920 Antwerp	Shooting	Men's 30 m team military pistol
57	Bronze	Georgios Roubanis	1956 Melbourne	Athletics	Men's pole vault
58	Gold	Crown Prince Constantine; Odysseus Eskitzoglou; Georgios Zaimis	1960 Rome	Sailing	Dragon
59	Bronze	Petros Galaktopoulos	1968 Mexico City	Wrestling	Men's Greco-Roman 70 kg
60	Silver	Ilias Hatzipavlis	1972 Munich	Sailing	Finn
61	Silver	Petros Galaktopoulos	1972 Munich	Wrestling	Men's Greco-Roman 74 kg
62	Gold	Stelios Mygiakis	1980 Moscow	Wrestling	Men's Greco-Roman 62 kg
63	Bronze	Georgios Hatziioannidis	1980 Moscow	Wrestling	Men's freestyle 62 kg
64	Bronze	Aristidis Rapanakis; Anastasios Gavrilis; Anastasios Bountouris	1980 Moscow	Sailing	Soling
65	Silver	Dimitrios Thanopoulos	1984 Los Angeles	Wrestling	Men's Greco-Roman 82 kg
66	Bronze	Charalambos Cholidis	1984 Los Angeles	Wrestling	Men's Greco-Roman 57 kg
67	Bronze	Charalambos Cholidis	1988 Seoul	Wrestling	Men's Greco-Roman 57 kg
68	Gold	Voula Patoulidou	1992 Barcelona	Athletics	Women's 100 metres hurdles
69	Gold	Pyrros Dimas	1992 Barcelona	Weightlifting	Men's 82.5 kg
70	Gold	Ioannis Melissanidis	1996 Atlanta	Gymnastics	Men's floor
71	Gold	Nikolaos Kaklamanakis	1996 Atlanta	Sailing	Men's Mistral One Design
72	Gold	Pyrros Dimas	1996 Atlanta	Weightlifting	Men's 83 kg
73	Gold	Kakhi Kakhiashvili	1996 Atlanta	Weightlifting	Men's 99 kg
74	Silver	Niki Bakoyianni	1996 Atlanta	Athletics	Women's high jump
75	Silver	Leonidas Sabanis	1996 Atlanta	Weightlifting	Men's 59 kg
76	Silver	Valerios Leonidis	1996 Atlanta	Weightlifting	Men's 64 kg
77	Silver	Leonidas Kokas	1996 Atlanta	Weightlifting	Men's 91 kg
78	Gold	Konstantinos Kenteris	2000 Sydney	Athletics	Men's 200 metres
79	Gold	Michalis Mouroutsos	2000 Sydney	Taekwondo	Men's 58 kg
80	Gold	Pyrros Dimas	2000 Sydney	Weightlifting	Men's 85 kg
81	Gold	Kakhi Kakhiashvili	2000 Sydney	Weightlifting	Men's 94 kg
82	Silver	Ekaterini Thanou	2000 Sydney	Athletics	Women's 100 metres
83	Silver	Anastasia Kelesidou	2000 Sydney	Athletics	Women's discus throw
84	Silver	Mirela Maniani	2000 Sydney	Athletics	Women's javelin throw
85	Silver	Dimosthenis Tampakos	2000 Sydney	Gymnastics	Men's rings
86	Silver	Leonidas Sabanis	2000 Sydney	Weightlifting	Men's 62 kg
87	Silver	Viktor Mitrou	2000 Sydney	Weightlifting	Men's 77 kg
88	Bronze	Ioanna Chatziioannou	2000 Sydney	Weightlifting	Women's 63 kg
89	Bronze	Amiran Kardanov	2000 Sydney	Wrestling	Men's freestyle 54 kg
90	Bronze	Eirini Aindili; Evangelia Christodoulou; Maria Georgatou; Zacharoula Karyami; Charikleia Pantazi; Anna Pollatou	2000 Sydney	Gymnastics	Women's rhythmic group all-around
91	Gold	Thomas Bimis; Nikolaos Siranidis	2004 Athens	Diving	Men's 3 m synchronized springboard
92	Gold	Ilias Iliadis	2004 Athens	Judo	Men's -81 kg
93	Gold	Sofia Bekatorou; Emilia Tsoulfa	2004 Athens	Sailing	Women's 470
94	Gold	Dimosthenis Tampakos	2004 Athens	Gymnastics	Men's rings
95	Gold	Athanasia Tsoumeleka	2004 Athens	Athletics	Women's 20 km walk
96	Gold	Fani Chalkia	2004 Athens	Athletics	Women's 400 m hurdles
97	Silver	Anastasia Kelesidou	2004 Athens	Athletics	Women's discus throw
98	Silver	Nikolaos Kaklamanakis	2004 Athens	Sailing	Men's mistral
99	Silver	Hrysopiyi Devetzi	2004 Athens	Athletics	Women's triple jump
100	Silver	Women's water polo team: Dimitra Asilian Georgia Ellinaki Eftychia Karagianni Angeliki Karapataki Stavroula Kozompoli Georgia Lara Kyriaki Liosi Antiopi Melidoni Antonia Moraiti Evangelia Moraitidou Anthoula Mylonaki Aikaterini Oikonomopoulou Antigoni Roumpesi	2004 Athens	Water polo	Women's tournament
101	Silver	Elisavet Mystakidou	2004 Athens	Taekwondo	Women's -67 kg
102	Silver	Alexandros Nikolaidis	2004 Athens	Taekwondo	Men's +80 kg
103	Bronze	Pyrros Dimas	2004 Athens	Weightlifting	Men's -85 kg
104	Bronze	Vasileios Polymeros; Nikolaos Skiathitis	2004 Athens	Rowing	Men's lightweight double sculls
105	Bronze	Artiom Kiouregkian	2004 Athens	Wrestling	Men's Greco-Roman -55 kg
106	Bronze	Mirela Maniani	2004 Athens	Athletics	Women's javelin throw
107	Silver	Dimitrios Mouyios; Vasileios Polymeros	2008 Beijing	Rowing	Men's lightweight double sculls
108	Silver	Alexandros Nikolaidis	2008 Beijing	Taekwondo	Men's +80 kg
109	Bronze	Sofia Bekatorou; Virginia Kravarioti; Sofia Papadopoulou	2008 Beijing	Sailing	Women's yngling class
110	Bronze	Ilias Iliadis	2012 London	Judo	Men's 90 kg
111	Bronze	Christina Giazitzidou; Alexandra Tsiavou	2012 London	Rowing	Women's lightweight double sculls
112	Gold	Anna Korakaki	2016 Rio de Janeiro	Shooting	Women's 25 m pistol
113	Gold	Eleftherios Petrounias	2016 Rio de Janeiro	Gymnastics	Men's rings
114	Gold	Katerina Stefanidi	2016 Rio de Janeiro	Athletics	Women's pole vault
115	Silver	Spyridon Gianniotis	2016 Rio de Janeiro	Swimming	Men's 10 km open water
116	Bronze	Anna Korakaki	2016 Rio de Janeiro	Shooting	Women's 10 m air pistol
117	Bronze	Pavlos Kagialis; Panagiotis Mantis	2016 Rio de Janeiro	Sailing	Men's 470
118	Gold	Stefanos Ntouskos	2020 Tokyo	Rowing	Men's single sculls
119	Gold	Miltiadis Tentoglou	2020 Tokyo	Athletics	Men's long jump
120	Silver	Men's water polo team: Emmanouil Zerdevas Konstantinos Genidounias Dimitrios Skoumpakis Marios Kapotsis Ioannis Fountoulis Alexandros Papanastasiou Georgios Dervisis Stylianos Argyropoulos Konstantinos Mourikis Christodoulos Kolomvos Konstantinos Gkiouvetsis Angelos Vlachopoulos Konstantinos Galanidis	2020 Tokyo	Water polo	Men's tournament
121	Bronze	Eleftherios Petrounias	2020 Tokyo	Gymnastics	Men's rings
122	Gold	Miltiadis Tentoglou	2024 Paris	Athletics	Men's long jump
123	Silver	Apostolos Christou	2024 Paris	Swimming	Men's 200 m backstroke
124	Bronze	Theodoros Tselidis	2024 Paris	Judo	Men's –90 kg
125	Bronze	Antonios Papakonstantinou; Petros Gkaidatzis	2024 Paris	Rowing	Men's lightweight double sculls
126	Bronze	Zoi Fitsiou; Milena Kontou	2024 Paris	Rowing	Women's lightweight double sculls
127	Bronze	Eleftherios Petrounias	2024 Paris	Gymnastics	Men's rings
128	Bronze	Emmanouil Karalis	2024 Paris	Athletics	Men's pole vault
129	Bronze	Dauren Kurugliev	2024 Paris	Wrestling	Men's freestyle –86 kg

=== Athletes with most medals ===
The table below lists the athletes that have won more than one Olympic medal while competing for Greece. It does not include medals won for other nations and mixed teams. The athletes are shown in order by the number of total medals won; in case of the same number of total medals they are sorted by gold, silver and then bronze medals.

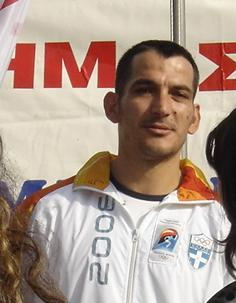
Pyrros Dimas is the top Greek Olympic medalist having won three gold and one bronze medal in weightlifting.

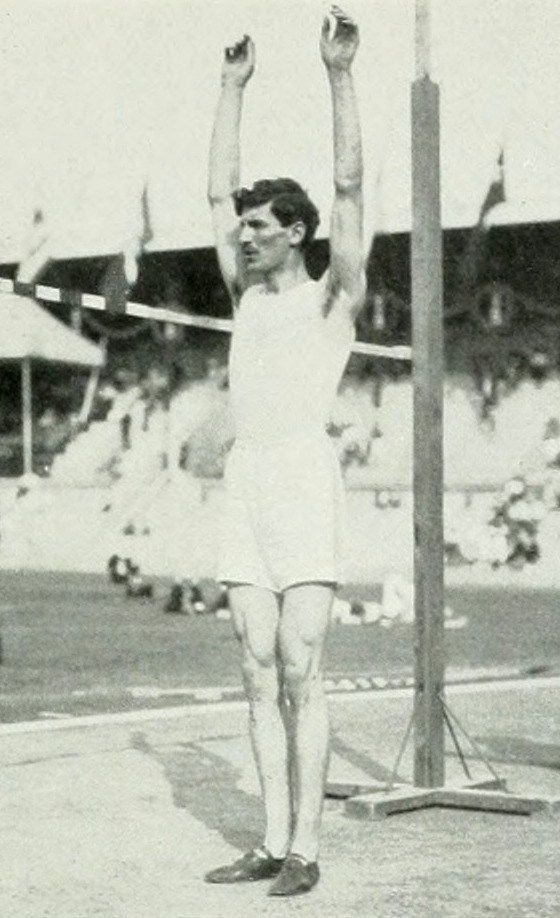
Konstantinos Tsiklitiras has won four Olympic medals in athletics and ties Pyrros Dimas for the Greek athlete with the most Olympic medals won in total.

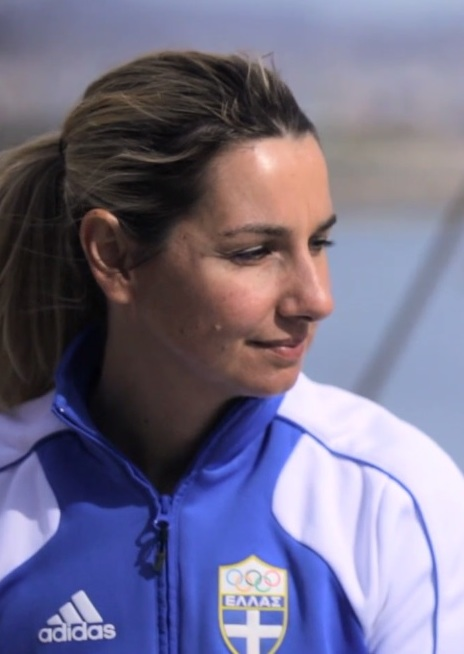
Sofia Bekatorou, with a gold (2004) and a bronze medal (2008) in sailing.

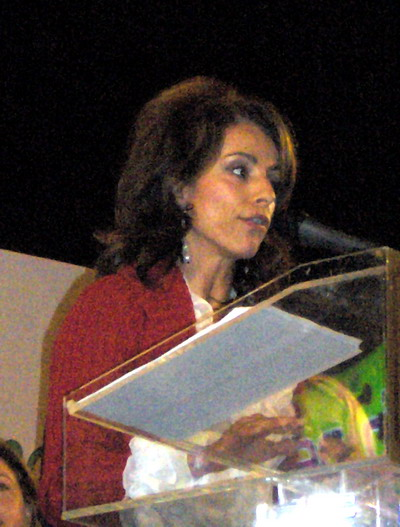
Voula Patoulidou was the first Greek female athlete to win a gold Olympic medal in 1992.

Athlete	Sport	Games	Gold medal	Silver medal	Bronze medal	Total
Pyrros Dimas	Weightlifting	1992–1996–2000–2004	3	0	1	4
Konstantinos Tsiklitiras	Athletics	1908–1912	1	2	1	4
Ioannis Frangoudis	Shooting	1896	1	1	1	3
Eleftherios Petrounias	Gymnastics	2016–2020-2024	1	0	2	3
Kakhi Kakhiashvili	Weightlifting	1996–2000	2	0	0	2
Miltiadis Tentoglou	Athletics	2020–2024	2	0	0	2
Nikolaos Andriakopoulos	Gymnastics	1896	1	1	0	2
Georgios Orphanidis	Shooting	1896	1	1	0	2
Nikolaos Kaklamanakis	Sailing	1996–2004	1	1	0	2
Dimosthenis Tampakos	Gymnastics	2000–2004	1	1	0	2
Ioannis Mitropoulos	Gymnastics	1896	1	0	1	2
Sofia Bekatorou	Sailing	2004–2008	1	0	1	2
Ilias Iliadis	Judo	2004–2012	1	0	1	2
Anna Korakaki	Shooting	2016	1	0	1	2
Dimitrios Kasdaglis	Tennis	1896	0	2	0	2
Stamatios Nikolopoulos	Cycling	1896	0	2	0	2
Thomas Xenakis	Gymnastics	1896	0	2	0	2
Leonidas Sabanis	Weightlifting	1996–2000	0	2	0	2
Anastasia Kelesidou	Athletics	2000–2004	0	2	0	2
Alexandros Nikolaidis	Taekwondo	2004–2008	0	2	0	2
Petros Persakis	Gymnastics	1896	0	1	1	2
Petros Galaktopoulos	Wrestling	1968–1972	0	1	1	2
Mirela Maniani	Athletics	2000–2004	0	1	1	2
Vasileios Polymeros	Rowing	2004–2008	0	1	1	2
Sotirios Versis	Athletics Weightlifting	1896	0	0	2	2
Charalambos Cholidis	Wrestling	1984–1988	0	0	2	2

=== Top medalists ===
The tables below list the top Olympic medalists for Greece, sorted by gold, silver and then bronze medals.

Men

Athlete	Sport	Games	Gold medal	Silver medal	Bronze medal	Total
Pyrros Dimas	Weightlifting	1992–1996–2000–2004	3	0	1	4
Akakios Kakiasvilis	Weightlifting	1996–2000	2	0	0	2
Miltiadis Tentoglou	Athletics	2020–2024	2	0	0	2
Konstantinos Tsiklitiras	Athletics	1908–1912	1	2	1	4
Ioannis Frangoudis	Shooting	1896	1	1	1	3
Nikolaos Andriakopoulos	Gymnastics	1896	1	1	0	2
Georgios Orphanidis	Shooting	1896	1	1	0	2
Nikolaos Kaklamanakis	Sailing	1996–2004	1	1	0	2
Dimosthenis Tampakos	Gymnastics	2000–2004	1	1	0	2
Eleftherios Petrounias	Gymnastics	2016–2020-2024	1	0	2	3
Ioannis Mitropoulos	Gymnastics	1896	1	0	1	2
Ilias Iliadis	Judo	2004–2012	1	0	1	2

Women

Athlete	Sport	Games	Gold medal	Silver medal	Bronze medal	Total
Sofia Bekatorou	Sailing	2004–2008	1	0	1	2
Anna Korakaki	Shooting	2016	1	0	1	2
Voula Patoulidou	Athletics	1992	1	0	0	1
Fani Chalkia	Athletics	2004	1	0	0	1
Emilia Tsoulfa	Sailing	2004	1	0	0	1
Athanasia Tsoumeleka	Athletics	2004	1	0	0	1
Ekaterini Stefanidi	Athletics	2016	1	0	0	1
Anastasia Kelesidou	Athletics	2000–2004	0	2	0	2
Mirela Maniani	Athletics	2000–2004	0	1	1	2

=== Additional disputed medals of 1896 ===
There is confusion about certain results and medals in the first Summer Olympics of 1896. The Hellenic Olympic Committee, claiming different sources, cites in its website some different results for certain events and some additional medals for Greece, which are contradictory to those appearing in the IOC website. They are cited here separately and are not included in any of the other tables.

Table of additional medals and medalists recognised by the HOC
Athlete	Sport	Event	Medal according to HOC	Position according to IOC	Medalist according to IOC
Efstathios Chorafas	Swimming	Men's 100 metre freestyle	Silver	Unknown (3 to 6)	Otto Herschmann
Konstantinos Akratopoulos - Aristidis Akratopoulos	Tennis	Men's doubles	Bronze	4	Edwin Flack - George Stuart Robertson
Aristovoulos Petmezas	Gymnastics	Men's horizontal bar	Bronze	Did not participate	None
Efstathios Chorafas	Swimming	Men's 1200 m freestyle	Bronze	Unknown (3 to 5)	None
Georgios Paraskevopoulos	Cycling	12 hour race	Bronze	Did not finish	None

== Summary by sport ==
=== Aquatics ===
==== Swimming ====
Greece first competed in swimming at the inaugural 1896 Games, sweeping the top three spots in one event open only to Greek sailors and winning two silver and one bronze medal in international events. Greek swimmers have won only two silver medals since then at the 2016 and 2024 Games.

Games	Gold	Silver	Bronze	Total
Athens 1896	1	3	2	6
Rio 2016	0	1	0	1
Paris 2024	0	1	0	1
Total	1	5	2	8

==== Diving ====
Greece won a gold medal in Diving at the 2004 Games.

Games	Gold	Silver	Bronze	Total
Athens 2004	1	0	0	1
Total	1	0	0	1

==== Water Polo ====
Greece has won silver medals at the 2004 Games (women's) and 2020 Games (men's).

Games	Gold	Silver	Bronze	Total
Athens 2004	0	1	0	1
Tokyo 2020	0	1	0	1
Total	0	2	0	2

=== Athletics ===
Greece first competed in athletics at the first Games in 1896, winning the men's marathon. Since then, Greece have won numerous medals in athletics especially from the 1992 Games through to the 2020 Games, in what is Greece's most successful sport at the Olympic Games.

Games	Gold	Silver	Bronze	Total
Athens 1896	1	3	6	10
St. Louis 1904	0	0	1	1
London 1908	0	3	0	3
Stockholm 1912	1	0	1	2
Melbourne 1956	0	0	1	1
Barcelona 1992	1	0	0	1
Atlanta 1996	0	1	0	1
Sydney 2000	1	3	0	4
Athens 2004	2	2	1	5
Rio 2016	1	0	0	1
Tokyo 2020	1	0	0	1
Paris 2024	1	0	1	2
Total	9	12	11	32

=== Cycling ===
Greece competed in all six of the cycling events at the first Games in 1896, winning one event and taking three second-place finishes. As of 2020, those were still the only cycling medals earned by Greek competitors.

Games	Gold	Silver	Bronze	Total
Athens 1896	1	3	0	4
Total	1	3	0	4

=== Fencing ===
Greece competed in all three fencing events at the inaugural 1896 Games, winning two (the men's master's foil and the men's sabre) and adding a second-place finish in the men's sabre and third-place in the men's foil. However another bronze medal is considered nowadays in the same event. Those remain the only fencing medals Greece has won to date (through the 2020 Olympics).

Games	Gold	Silver	Bronze	Total
Athens 1896	2	1	2	5
Total	2	1	2	5

=== Gymnastics ===
Greece sent 52 gymnasts to the first Games in 1896 (when team events featured very large teams), winning six medals including two of each color. Since then, Greece have won many medals in Gymnastics from the 1996 Games through to the 2020 Games.

Games	Gold	Silver	Bronze	Total
Athens 1896	2	2	2	6
Atlanta 1996	1	0	0	1
Sydney 2000	0	1	1	2
Athens 2004	1	0	0	1
Rio 2016	1	0	0	1
Tokyo 2020	0	0	1	1
Paris 2024	0	0	1	1
Total	5	3	5	13

=== Judo ===
Greece first competed in judo at the 2004 Games and has won three medals since.

Games	Gold	Silver	Bronze	Total
Athens 2004	1	0	0	1
London 2012	0	0	1	1
Paris 2024	0	0	1	1
Total	1	0	2	3

=== Rowing ===
Greece first won a rowing medal at the 2004 Games and has won more medals since then.

Games	Gold	Silver	Bronze	Total
Athens 2004	0	0	1	1
Beijing 2008	0	1	0	1
London 2012	0	0	1	1
Tokyo 2020	1	0	0	1
Paris 2024	0	0	2	2
Total	1	1	4	6

=== Sailing ===
Greece first competed in the sailing events in 1948 and won its first medal at the 1960 Games and has won numerous medals since then.

Games	Gold	Silver	Bronze	Total
1960 Rome	1	0	0	1
1972 Munich	0	1	0	1
1980 Moscow	0	0	1	1
1996 Atlanta	1	0	0	1
2004 Athens	1	1	0	2
2008 Beijing	0	0	1	1
2016 Rio	0	0	1	1
Total	3	2	3	8

=== Shooting ===
Greece competed in all five shooting events at the inaugural 1896 Games, winning three and medaling in the other two (earning a total of 9 medals) and has won shooting medals again from the 2016 Games onwards.

Games	Gold	Silver	Bronze	Total
Athens 1896	3	3	3	9
London 1908	0	0	1	1
Antwerp 1920	0	1	0	1
Rio 2016	1	0	1	2
Total	4	4	5	13

=== Tae Kwon Do ===
Greece first competed in tae kwon do at the 2000 Games and had a notable success during the 2000s decade, winning medals in 3 consecutive Olympic Games.

Games	Gold	Silver	Bronze	Total
Sydney 2000	1	0	0	1
Athens 2004	0	2	0	2
Beijing 2008	0	1	0	1
Total	1	3	0	4

=== Tennis ===
Greece first competed in tennis at the inaugural 1896 Games, with seven players competing in men's singles and doubles. Greek players won the silver and bronze medals in the singles; a pair of Greek players combined to win the silver in the doubles, nowadays considered a Greek team and therefore a Greek medal. The 1896 medals remain (through the 2020 Games) the only tennis medals won by Greek players.

Games	Gold	Silver	Bronze	Total
Athens 1896	0	2	1	3
Total	0	2	1	3

=== Weightlifting ===
Greece first competed in weightlifting at the inaugural 1896 Games, with three lifters competing. Greek lifters won the bronze medals in both events. Since then, Greek lifters won numerous medals from the 1992 Games through to the 2004 Games, including from Greece's top Olympic medalist Pyrros Dimas.

Games	Gold	Silver	Bronze	Total
Athens 1896	0	0	2	2
St. Louis 1904	1	0	0	1
Barcelona 1992	1	0	0	1
Atlanta 1996	2	3	0	5
Sydney 2000	2	2	1	5
Athens 2004	0	0	1	1
Total	6	5	4	15

=== Wrestling ===
Greece first competed in wrestling at the inaugural 1896 Games, with two wrestlers competing in the open weight class event and taking the silver and bronze medals. Since then, Greek wrestlers have won medals from the 1968 Games onwards.

Games	Gold	Silver	Bronze	Total
Athens 1896	0	1	1	2
Mexico 1968	0	0	1	1
Munich 1972	0	1	0	1
Moscow 1980	1	0	1	2
Los Angeles 1984	0	1	1	2
Seoul 1988	0	0	1	1
Sydney 2000	0	0	1	1
Athens 2004	0	0	1	1
Paris 2024	0	0	1	1
Total	1	3	8	12

== Hosted Olympic logos and mottos ==
=== 1896 Summer Olympics ===
In 1896 the first modern Olympic Games were hosted in Athens, the capital of Greece. The Games were a revival of the ancient Games held every four years in Olympia, in which participants from all Greek city-states were taking part, during antiquity.

By tradition, Greece is since then the first country to enter the stadium, during opening ceremonies.

=== 2004 Summer Olympics ===
The 2004 Summer Olympics were hosted predominately in Athens, with a few events in other Greek cities including Thessaloniki, Patras, Volos and Heraklion.

The Games' motto was Welcome Home (Καλώς ήρθατε σπίτι). The 2004 logo consisted of an olive tree branch (κότινος), with the colors of the modern Greek flag. The olive tree was a symbol of the city of Athens, while "kotinos" represented the Olympic spirit, as it was the only reward that the athletes were receiving in Olympia, during the ancient Games. The logo was revealed in 1999.

== See also ==
- List of flag bearers for Greece at the Olympics
- Category:Olympic competitors for Greece
- Greece at the Paralympics
