= Italy at the Olympics =

- IOC code: ITA
- NOC: Italian National Olympic Committee
- Website: www.coni.it (in Italian)
- Medals Ranked 7th: Gold 281 Silver 250 Bronze 298 Total 829

Summer appearances
- 1896; 1900; 1904; 1908; 1912; 1920; 1924; 1928; 1932; 1936; 1948; 1952; 1956; 1960; 1964; 1968; 1972; 1976; 1980; 1984; 1988; 1992; 1996; 2000; 2004; 2008; 2012; 2016; 2020; 2024; 2028

Winter appearances
- 1924; 1928; 1932; 1936; 1948; 1952; 1956; 1960; 1964; 1968; 1972; 1976; 1980; 1984; 1988; 1992; 1994; 1998; 2002; 2006; 2010; 2014; 2018; 2022; 2026

Other related appearances
- 1906 Intercalated Games

Italy has sent athletes to most of the modern Olympic Games held since 1896, outside of not having officially participated (as a national delegation) in the 1904 Summer Olympics. The Italian National Olympic Committee was created in 1914 and recognised in 1915. As of 2024, Italy is the most successful nation at fencing in Olympic history.

Italy has taken part in all the Winter Olympic Games, winning 171 medals, and has won 658 medals at the Summer Olympic Games.

Italy's total of 281 gold medals makes it the seventh most successful country in Olympic history, after the United States, the Soviet Union, China, Germany, Great Britain, and France. Italy has also the sixth highest medal total of all time with 829. Italy has the third longest medaling streak after Sweden and Finland. It has medaled in 40 straight Olympic Games, starting with the 1936 Summer Olympics.

Italy has hosted a Summer Olympics edition (in 1960) and three Winter Olympics (in 1956, 2006 and 2026).

== Hosted Games ==
Italy has hosted the Games on four occasions.

Games	Host city	Dates	Nations	Participants	Events
1956 Winter Olympics	Cortina d'Ampezzo	26 January – 5 February	32	821	24
1960 Summer Olympics	Rome	25 August – 11 September	83	5,338	150
2006 Winter Olympics	Turin	10–26 February	80	2,508	84
2026 Winter Olympics	Milan-Cortina d'Ampezzo	6–22 February	92	2,871	115

== Medal tables ==
Flag used from 1896 to 1946

According to the official count of the International Olympic Committee, Italy has won 658 medals at Summer Olympics.

In the Summer Olympic Games, Italy has finished 2nd in 1932, 3rd in 1960, 4th in 1936, and 5th in 1924, 1928, 1948, 1952, 1956, 1964, 1980 and 1984. In the Winter Olympic Games, Italy has finished 4th in 1968, 1994 and 2026, and 6th in 1952 and 1992.

Italy ranks 1st all-time in fencing, 2nd in cycling, 3rd in luge, 4th in boxing and shooting, 5th in alpine skiing, and 6th in bobsled, cross-country skiing and short track speed skating.

=== Medals by Summer Games ===
Host country

Games	Athletes	Gold	Silver	Bronze	Total	Rank
(Kingdom of Greece) 1896 Athens	1	0	0	0	0	–
(French Third Republic) 1900 Paris	24	3	2	0	5	8
(United States) 1904 St. Louis	1^{[a]}	0	0	0	0	–
(United Kingdom) 1908 London	68	2	2	0	4	9
(Sweden) 1912 Stockholm	61	3	1	2	6	11
(Belgium) 1920 Antwerp	174	13	5	5	23	7
(French Third Republic) 1924 Paris	200	8	3	5	16	5
(Netherlands) 1928 Amsterdam	174	7	5	7	19	5
(United States) 1932 Los Angeles	112	12	12	12	36	2
(Nazi Germany) 1936 Berlin	243	8	9	5	22	4
(United Kingdom) 1948 London	213	8	11	8	27	5
(Finland) 1952 Helsinki	231	8	9	4	21	5
(Australia) 1956 Melbourne	129	8	8	9	25	5
(Italy) 1960 Rome	280	13	10	13	36	3
(Japan) 1964 Tokyo	168	10	10	7	27	5
1968 Mexico City	167	3	4	9	16	13
(West Germany) 1972 Munich	224	5	3	10	18	10
(Canada) 1976 Montreal	210	2	7	4	13	14
(Soviet Union) 1980 Moscow	159	8	3	4	15	5
(United States) 1984 Los Angeles	268	14	6	12	32	5
(South Korea) 1988 Seoul	253	6	4	4	14	10
(Spain) 1992 Barcelona	304	6	5	8	19	12
(United States) 1996 Atlanta	340	13	10	12	35	6
(Australia) 2000 Sydney	361	13	8	13	34	7
(Greece) 2004 Athens	364	10	11	11	32	8
(China) 2008 Beijing	344	8	9	10	27	9
(United Kingdom) 2012 London	285	8	9	11	28	9
(Brazil) 2016 Rio de Janeiro	314	8	12	8	28	9
(Japan) 2020 Tokyo	372	10	10	20	40	10
(France) 2024 Paris	402	12	13	15	40	9
(United States) 2028 Los Angeles	future event					
(Australia) 2032 Brisbane	future event					
Total (30/30)	6,446	229	201	228	658	6

- ^{a} Cyclist Frank Bizzoni, who immigrated from Italy to the United States but still was an Italian citizen in 1904, was disputed and not recognized by the International Olympic Committee until the 21st century.

=== Medals by Winter Games ===
Host country

Games	Athletes	Gold	Silver	Bronze	Total	Rank
(France) 1924 Chamonix	23	0	0	0	0	–
(Switzerland) 1928 St. Moritz	13	0	0	0	0	–
(United States) 1932 Lake Placid	12	0	0	0	0	–
(Nazi Germany) 1936 Garmisch-Partenkirchen	40	0	0	0	0	–
(Switzerland) 1948 St. Moritz	57	1	0	0	1	10
(Norway) 1952 Oslo	33	1	0	1	2	6
(Italy) 1956 Cortina d'Ampezzo	65	1	2	0	3	8
(United States) 1960 Squaw Valley	28	0	0	1	1	14
(Austria) 1964 Innsbruck	61	0	1	3	4	12
(France) 1968 Grenoble	52	4	0	0	4	4
(Japan) 1972 Sapporo	44	2	2	1	5	8
(Austria) 1976 Innsbruck	58	1	2	1	4	10
(United States) 1980 Lake Placid	46	0	2	0	2	13
(Socialist Federal Republic of Yugoslavia) 1984 Sarajevo	74	2	0	0	2	10
(Canada) 1988 Calgary	58	2	1	2	5	10
(France) 1992 Albertville	107	4	6	4	14	6
(Norway) 1994 Lillehammer	104	7	5	8	20	4
(Japan) 1998 Nagano	113	2	6	2	10	10
(United States) 2002 Salt Lake City	112	4	4	5	13	7
(Italy) 2006 Turin	185	5	0	6	11	9
(Canada) 2010 Vancouver	114	1	1	3	5	16
(Russia) 2014 Sochi	113	0	2	6	8	23
(South Korea) 2018 Pyeongchang	120	3	2	5	10	12
(China) 2022 Beijing	118	2	7	8	17	13
(Italy) 2026 Milano Cortina	196	10	6	14	30	4
(France) 2030 French Alps	future event					
(United States) 2034 Utah	future event					
Total (25/25)	1,946	52	49	70	171	10

=== Medals by summer sport ===
Leading in that sport

Sport	Gold	Silver	Bronze	Total
Fencing	50	49	36	135
Cycling	36	18	13	67
Athletics	24	16	28	68
Shooting	17	18	12	47
Boxing	15	15	18	48
Gymnastics	15	8	14	37
Rowing	11	16	16	43
Equestrian	7	9	7	23
Canoeing	7	8	4	19
Swimming	7	7	17	31
Wrestling	7	4	11	22
Sailing	6	3	8	17
Weightlifting	5	5	8	18
Judo	5	4	9	18
Water polo	4	3	3	10
Diving	3	5	3	11
Archery	2	3	4	9
Modern pentathlon	2	2	4	8
Taekwondo	2	1	2	5
Volleyball	1	3	3	7
Football	1	0	2	3
Tennis	1	0	2	3
Karate	1	0	1	2
Basketball	0	2	0	2
Marathon swimming	0	1	3	4
Beach volleyball	0	1	0	1
Totals (26 entries)	229	201	228	658

=== Medals by winter sport ===
Sport	Gold	Silver	Bronze	Total
Alpine skiing	16	12	13	41
Cross-country skiing	9	14	15	38
Luge	9	4	9	22
Speed skating	5	1	6	12
Short track speed skating	4	8	7	19
Bobsleigh	4	4	4	12
Snowboarding	1	3	4	8
Biathlon	1	2	6	9
Freestyle skiing	1	1	1	3
Curling	1	0	1	2
Skeleton	1	0	0	1
Figure skating	0	0	3	3
Nordic combined	0	0	1	1
Totals (13 entries)	52	49	70	171

== Athletes with most appearances ==
Female athlete

Partecip.	Athlete	Born	Edition	Period (age 1st / last)	Sport	Gold medal	Silver medal	Bronze medal	Tot.
8	Raimondo D'Inzeo	1925	1948/1976	28 years (23/51)	Equestrian	1	2	3	6
8	Josefa Idem (Note: Six for Italy and two for West Germany)	1964	1984/2012	28 years (20/48)	Canoeing	1	2	2	5
8	**Giovanni Pellielo**	1970	1992/2024	32 years (22/54)	Shooting	0	3	1	4
8	Piero D'Inzeo	1923	1948/1976	28 years (25/53)	Equestrian	0	2	4	6
7	**Roland Fischnaller**	1980	2002/2026	24 years (22/46)	Snowboarding	0	0	0	0
6	**Arianna Fontana**	1990	2006/2026	20 years (16/36)	Short track speed skating	3	6	5	14
6	Armin Zöggeler	1974	1994/2014	20 years (20/40)	Luge	2	1	3	6
6	Angelo Mazzoni	1961	1980/2000	20 years (19/39)	Fencing	2	0	1	3
6	Alessandra Sensini	1970	1992/2012	20 years (22/42)	Sailing	1	1	2	4
6	Andrea Benelli	1960	1988/2008	20 years (28/48)	Shooting	1	0	1	2
6	Gerda Weissensteiner	1969	1988/2006	18 years (19/37)	Luge & Bobsleigh	1	0	1	2
6	Wilfried Huber	1970	1988/2006	18 years (18/36)	Luge	1	0	0	1
6	Ilario Di Buò	1965	1984/2008	20 years (19/43)	Archery	0	2	0	2
6	Marco De Nicolo	1976	2000/2020	21 years (22/45)	Shooting	0	0	0	0
6	Natalia Valeeva (Note: Four for Italy, one for Moldavia and one for Unified Team)	1969	1992/2012	20 years (23/43)	Archery	0	0	0	0

Notes: Names in bold indicate that they are still active.

== Athletes with most medals ==
The Italian athlete who won the most medals in the history of the Olympic Games, is the short track speed skater Arianna Fontana.

Still active

Athlete	Sport	Games	Gold medal	Silver medal	Bronze medal	Total
Arianna Fontana	Short track speed skating	2006–2010–2014–2018–2022–2026	3	6	5	14
Edoardo Mangiarotti	Fencing	1936–1948–1952–1956–1960	6	5	2	13
Stefania Belmondo	Cross country skiing	1992–1994–1998–2002	2	3	5	10
Valentina Vezzali	Fencing	1996–2000–2004–2008–2012	6	1	2	9
Giulio Gaudini	Fencing	1928–1932–1936	3	4	2	9
Giovanna Trillini	Fencing	1992–1996–2000–2004–2008	4	1	3	8
Gustavo Marzi	Fencing	1928–1932–1936	2	5	0	7
Manuela Di Centa	Cross country skiing	1992–1994–1998	2	2	3	7
Nedo Nadi	Fencing	1912–1920	6	0	0	6
Giuseppe Delfino	Fencing	1952–1956–1960–1964	4	2	0	6
Armin Zöggeler	Luge	1994–1998–2002–2006–2010–2014	2	1	3	6
Eugenio Monti	Bobsleigh	1956–1964–1968	2	2	2	6
Raimondo D'Inzeo	Equestrian	1956–1960–1964–1972	1	2	3	6
Piero D'Inzeo	Equestrian	1956–1960–1964–1972	0	2	4	6
Oreste Puliti	Fencing	1920–1924–1928	4	1	0	5
Giorgio Zampori	Gymnastics	1912–1920–1924	4	0	1	5
Klaus Dibiasi	Diving	1964–1968–1972–1976	3	2	0	5
Alberto Tomba	Alpine skiing	1988–1992–1994	3	2	0	5
Antonio Rossi	Canoeing	1992–1996–2000–2004	3	1	1	5
Giancarlo Cornaggia	Fencing	1928–1932–1936	3	1	1	5
Manlio Di Rosa	Fencing	1936–1948–1952–1956	2	2	1	5
Federica Brignone	Alpine skiing	2010-2014-2018-2022-2026	2	1	2	5
Marco Albarello	Cross country skiing	1992–1994–1998	1	3	1	5
Carlo Massullo	Modern pentathlon	1984–1988–1992	1	2	2	5
Silvio Fauner	Cross country skiing	1992–1994–1998	1	2	2	5
Gregorio Paltrinieri	Swimming	2012-2016-2020-2024	1	2	2	5
Franco Menichelli	Artistic gymnastics	1960–1964	1	1	3	5
Gabriella Paruzzi	Cross country skiing	1992–1994–1998–2002–2006	1	0	4	5

== Men gold multi-medalist ==
In this table (sorted by individual totals gold medals), the men who have won gold individual medals at the Olympics (but also at the World Championships).

Still active

	Athlete	Sport	Born	Period	Individual						Team						Total										
	Athlete	Sport	Born	Period	Olympics			World Ch.			Olympics			World Ch.			Individual			Team			Individual + Team				
	Athlete	Sport	Born	Period						Gold medal	Silver medal	Bronze medal	Gold medal	Silver medal	Bronze medal	Gold medal	Silver medal	Bronze medal	Gold medal	Silver medal	Bronze medal						Tot.
1	Gregorio Paltrinieri (Note: Included the medals in marathon swimming and at the FINA World Swimming Championships (25 m))	Swimming	1994	2013-active	1	2	2	8	6	4	–	–	–	1	2	1	9	8	6	1	2	1	10	10	7	27	
2	Armin Zöggeler	Luge	1974	1994–2014	2	1	3	6	3	1	–	–	–	0	2	4	8	4	4	0	2	4	8	6	8	22	
3	Jury Chechi	Gymnastics	1969	1989–2004	1	0	1	5	0	2	–	–	–	-	-	-	6	0	3	-	-	-	6	0	3	9	
4	Klaus Dibiasi	Diving	1946	1964–1976	3	2	0	2	2	0	–	–	–	-	-	-	5	4	0	-	-	-	5	4	0	9	
5	Alberto Tomba	Alpine skiing	1966	1987–1996	3	2	0	2	0	2	–	–	–	-	-	-	5	2	2	-	-	-	5	2	2	9	
6	Gustav Thöni	Alpine skiing	1951	1972–1976	1	2	0	4	0	0	–	–	–	-	-	-	5	2	0	-	-	-	5	2	0	7	
7	Giorgio Zampori	Gymnastics	1887	1909–1913	1	0	1	4	1	1	3	0	1	0	0	2	5	1	2	3	0	3	8	1	5	14	
8	Leandro Faggin	Cycling	1933	1956–1968	1	0	0	3	3	3	1	0	0	-	-	-	4	3	3	1	0	0	5	3	3	11	
9	Vincenzo Maenza	Wrestling	1962	1982–1992	2	1	0	2	1	0	–	–	–	-	-	-	4	2	0	-	-	-	4	2	0	6	
10	Niccolò Campriani	Shooting	1987	2010–2016	3	1	0	1	0	1	–	–	–	–	–	–	4	1	1	–	–	–	4	1	1	6	
11	Thomas Ceccon (Note: Included the medals at the FINA World Swimming Championships (25 m))	Swimming	2000	2021-active	1	0	0	3	1	1	0	1	2	4	3	3	4	1	1	4	4	5	8	5	6	20	
12	Edoardo Mangiarotti	Fencing	1919	1936–1960	1	1	2	2	5	2	5	4	0	11	3	3	3	6	4	16	7	3	19	13	7	39	
13	Luigi Busà	Karate	1987	2010–active	1	0	0	2	4	1	–	–	–	-	-	-	3	4	1	-	-	-	3	4	1	8	
14	Sante Gaiardoni	Cycling	1939	1960–1970	2	0	0	1	3	2	–	–	–	-	-	-	3	3	2	-	-	-	3	3	2	8	
15	Raimondo D'Inzeo	Equestrian	1925	1955–1972	1	1	0	2	1	1	0	1	3	-	-	-	3	2	1	0	1	3	3	3	4	10	
16	Elia Viviani	Cycling	1989	2011–2025	1	0	1	2	1	3	0	1	0	0	1	0	3	1	4	0	2	0	3	3	4	10	
17	Andrea Benelli	Shooting	1960	1981–2006	1	0	1	2	1	1	–	–	–	7	3	2	3	1	2	7	3	2	10	4	4	18	
17	Roberto Cammarelle	Boxing	1980	2004–2012	1	1	1	2	0	1	–	–	–	-	-	-	3	1	2	-	-	-	3	1	2	6	
19	Paolo Bettini	Cycling	1974	2001–2007	1	0	0	2	1	0	–	–	–	-	-	-	3	1	0	-	-	-	3	1	0	4	
19	Zeno Colò	Alpine skiing	1920	1950–1952	1	0	0	2	1	0	–	–	–	-	-	-	3	1	0	-	-	-	3	1	0	4	
21	Maurizio Damilano	Athletics	1957	1980–1991	1	0	2	2	0	0	–	–	–	-	-	-	3	0	2	-	-	-	3	0	2	5	
21	Ercole Baldini	Cycling	1933	1956–1964	1	0	0	2	0	2	–	–	–	-	-	-	3	0	2	-	-	-	3	0	2	5	
23	Silvio Martinello	Cycling	1963	1995–2000	1	0	0	2	0	1	0	0	1	3	2	0	3	0	1	3	2	1	6	2	2	10	
23	Ennio Mattarelli	Shooting	1928	1961–1973	1	0	0	2	0	1	–	–	–	-	-	-	3	0	1	-	-	-	3	0	1	4	
23	Gianmarco Tamberi (Note: Included the medals at the World Athletics Indoor Championships)	Athletics	1991	2016–active	1	0	0	2	0	1	–	–	–	-	-	-	3	0	1	-	-	-	3	0	1	4	
26	Luciano Giovannetti	Shooting	1945	1979–1986	2	0	0	1	0	0	–	–	–	3	1	0	3	0	0	3	1	0	6	1	0	7	
27	Nicolò Martinenghi (Note: Included the medals at the FINA World Swimming Championships (25 m))	Swimming	1999	2021-active	1	0	1	1	8	0	0	0	1	3	1	4	2	8	1	3	1	5	5	9	6	20	
28	Massimiliano Rosolino	Swimming	1978	1998–2007	1	1	1	1	1	1	0	0	1	0	2	0	2	2	2	0	2	1	2	4	3	9	
29	Carlo Pavesi	Fencing	1923	1950–1960	1	0	0	1	2	1	3	0	0	4	1	0	2	2	1	7	1	0	9	3	1	13	
29	Daniele Masala	Modern pentathlon	1955	1979–1988	1	0	0	1	2	1	1	1	0	1	0	3	2	2	1	2	1	3	4	3	4	11	
31	Mauro Numa	Fencing	1961	1979–1990	1	0	0	1	1	2	1	0	0	3	2	2	2	1	2	4	2	2	6	3	4	11	
31	Paul Hildgartner	Luge	1952	1972–1988	1	1	0	1	0	2	1	0	0	1	0	1	2	1	2	2	0	1	4	1	3	8	
33	Aldo Montano	Fencing	1978	2002–2012	1	0	0	1	1	0	0	1	2	0	4	2	2	1	0	0	5	4	2	6	4	12	
34	Vito Dell'Aquila	Taekwondo	2000	2017–active	1	0	0	1	0	1	–	–	–	-	-	-	2	0	1	-	-	-	2	0	1	3	
34	Gabriele Rossetti	Shooting	2000	2017–active	1	0	0	1	0	1	1	0	0	3	3	2	2	0	1	4	3	2	6	3	3	12	
36	Daniele Molmenti	Canoeing	1984	2005–2013	1	0	0	1	0	0	0	0	0	1	2	2	2	0	0	1	2	2	3	2	2	7	
36	Alberto Cova	Athletics	1958	1983–1984	1	0	0	1	0	0	–	–	–	-	-	-	2	0	0	-	-	-	2	0	0	2	
36	Ivano Brugnetti	Athletics	1976	1999–2004	1	0	0	1	0	0	–	–	–	-	-	-	2	0	0	-	-	-	2	0	0	2	
36	Massimo Stano	Athletics	1992	2021–active	1	0	0	1	0	0	–	–	–	-	-	-	2	0	0	-	-	-	2	0	0	2	
Athletes in team sports
1	Eugenio Monti	Bobsleigh	1928	1956–1968	–	–	–	-	-	-	2	2	2	9	1	0	–	–	–	11	3	2	11	3	2	16	
2	Carmine Abbagnale	Rowing	1962	1981–1993	–	–	–	-	-	-	2	1	0	7	4	1	–	–	–	9	5	1	9	5	1	15	
3	Giuseppe Abbagnale	Rowing	1959	1981–1993	–	–	–	-	-	-	2	1	0	7	3	1	–	–	–	9	4	1	9	4	1	14	
4	Antonio Rossi	Canoeing	1968	1992–2004	–	–	–	-	-	-	3	1	1	3	3	1	–	–	–	6	4	2	6	4	2	12	
5	Agostino Straulino	Sailing	1914	1939–1965	–	–	–	-	-	-	1	1	0	4	2	1	–	–	–	5	3	1	5	3	1	9	
6	Rossano Galtarossa	Rowing	1972	1992–2012	–	–	–	-	-	-	1	1	2	4	1	3	–	–	–	5	2	5	5	2	5	12	
7	Agostino Abbagnale	Rowing	1962	1985–2002	–	–	–	-	-	-	3	0	0	2	2	0	–	–	–	5	2	0	5	2	0	7	

Notes: For cycling, only professional events were considered for the World Championships.

== Women gold multi-medalist ==
The most successful Italian female athletes.

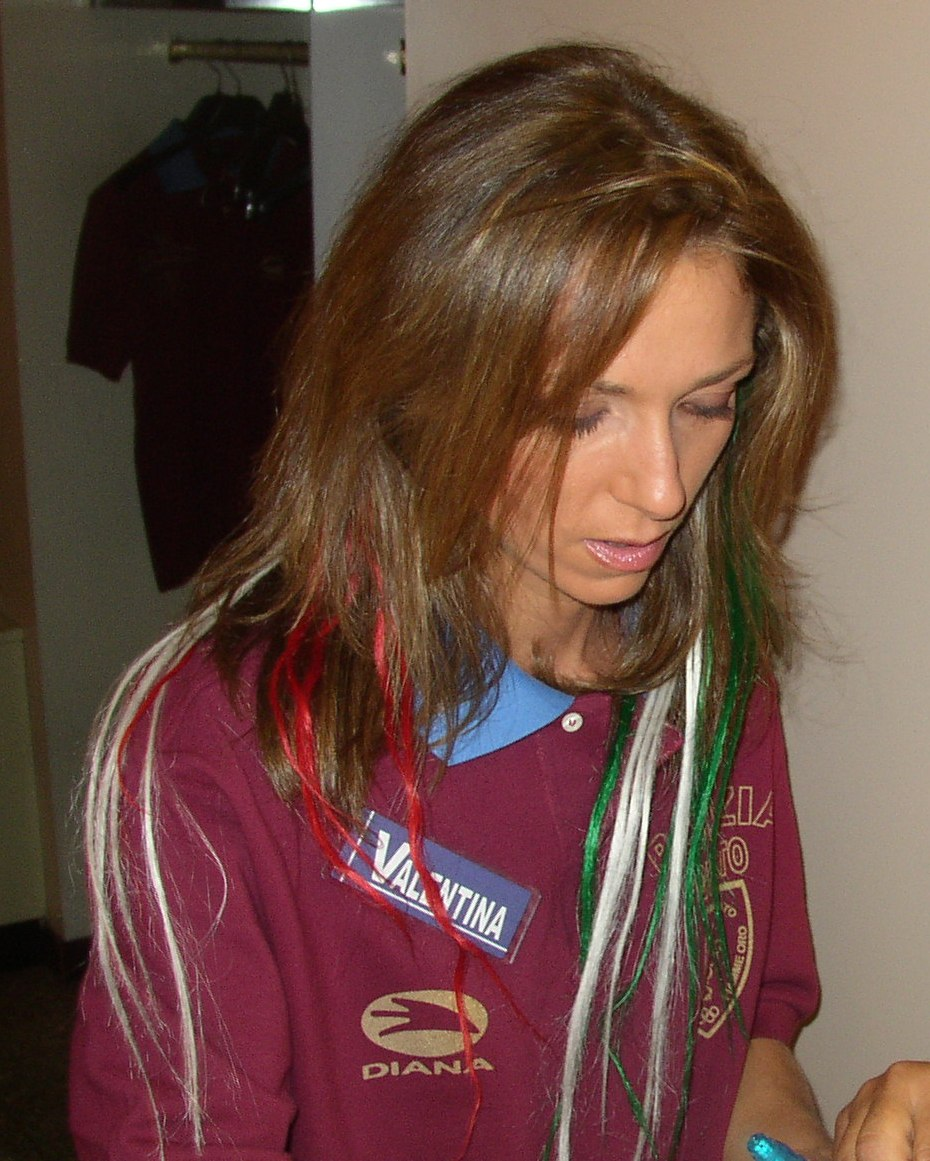
Valentina Vezzali

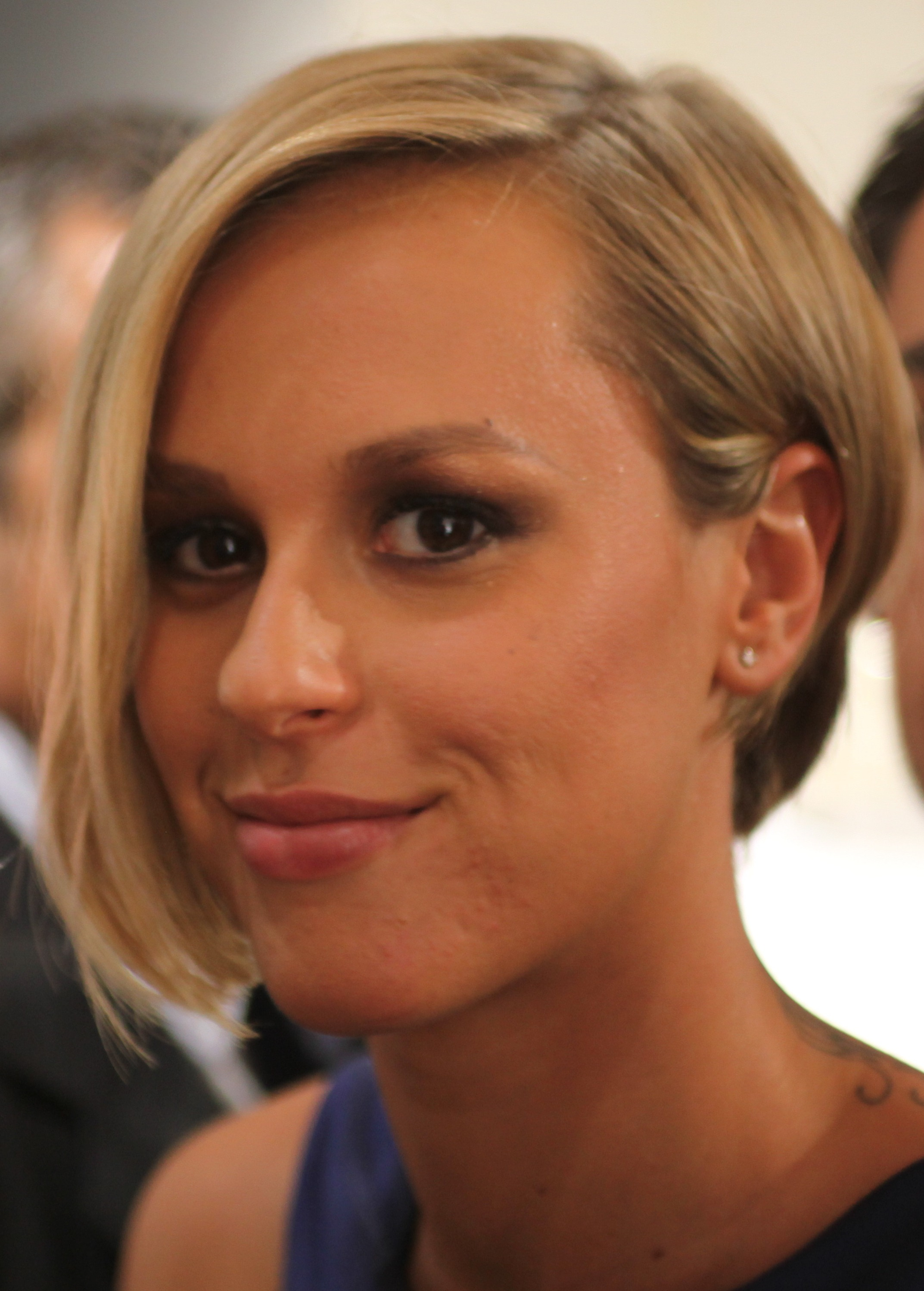
Federica Pellegrini

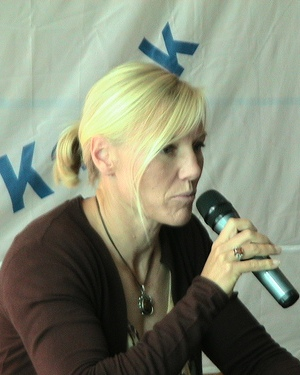
Josefa Idem

In this table, the women who have won gold medals at the Olympics and also at the World Championships. Updated to 23 February 2026.

Still active

#	Athlete	Sport	Born	Period	Olympics				World Ch.				Total					
#	Athlete	Sport	Born	Period						Gold medal	Silver medal	Bronze medal	Tot.	Gold medal	Silver medal	Bronze medal	Tot.	Tot.
1	Valentina Vezzali	Fencing	1974	1994–2016	6	1	2	9	16	6	4	26	22	7	6	35		
2	Giovanna Trillini	Fencing	1970	1992–2008	4	1	3	8	9	5	5	19	13	6	8	27		
3	Arianna Errigo	Fencing	1988	2009–2025	1	2	1	4	10	7	6	23	11	9	7	27		
4	Jessica Rossi	Shooting	1992	2009–2023	1	0	0	1	9	2	3	14	10	2	3	15		
5	Elisa Di Francisca	Fencing	1982	2009–2019	2	1	0	2	7	5	3	15	9	6	3	18		
6	Federica Pellegrini (Note: She also detained two swimming world records holder.)	Swimming	1988	2004–2019	1	1	0	2	6	4	1	11	7	5	1	13		
7	Diana Bianchedi	Fencing	1969	1989–2001	2	0	0	2	5	1	4	10	7	1	4	12		
8	Josefa Idem (Note: She won also 1 bronze at the Olympics and 2 bronze at the World Championshimps for West Germany.)	Canoeing	1964	1990–2009	1	2	1	4	5	9	6	20	6	11	7	24		
9	Stefania Belmondo	Cross-country skiing	1969	1992–2002	2	3	5	10	4	7	2	13	6	10	7	23		
10	Diana Bacosi	Shooting	1983	2016–2024	2	1	0	3	4	7	0	11	6	8	0	14		
11	Deborah Compagnoni	Alpine skiing	1970	1992–1998	3	1	0	4	3	0	0	3	6	1	0	7		
12	Alessandra Sensini	Windsurfing	1970	1996–2012	1	1	2	4	4	3	1	8	5	4	3	12		
13	Margherita Zalaffi	Fencing	1966	1982–2001	1	2	0	3	4	0	2	6	5	2	2	9		
14	Caterina Banti	Sailing	1987	2017–2025	2	0	0	2	4	0	1	5	5	0	1	6		
15	Arianna Fontana (Note: With 14 medals, she is the Italian athlete with the most medals of all time, but also the third overall at the Winter Olympic Games and the ninth at the Olympic Games, both Summer and Winter.)	Short-track	1990	2006–2026	3	6	5	14	1	6	10	17	4	12	15	31		
16	Federica Brignone (Note: She won also two World Cup.)	Alpine skiing	1990	2011–2026	2	1	2	5	2	3	0	5	4	4	2	10		
17	Paola Pezzo (Note: She won also one World Cup.)	Mountain bike	1969	1993–2000	2	0	0	2	2	0	2	4	4	0	2	6		
21	Lisa Vittozzi	Biathlon	1995	2015–2026	1	1	1	3	2	6	4	12	3	7	5	15		
19	Gerda Weissensteiner (Note: She won also 2 times la Luge World Cup on her sport.) (Note: She won bronze in bobsleigh double at 2006 Winter Olympics and others bmedals in luge.)	Luge & Bobsleigh	1969	1993–2006	1	0	1	2	2	3	6	11	3	3	7	13		
20	Rossella Fiamingo	Fencing	1991	2011–2024	1	1	1	3	2	2	4	8	3	3	5	11		
21	Irene Camber	Fencing	1926	1952–1960	1	0	1	2	2	1	5	8	3	1	6	10		
22	Francesca Lollobrigida	Speed Skating	1991	2022–2026	2	1	1	4	1	0	1	2	3	1	2	6		
23	Chiara Consonni	Track cycling	1999	2021–2025	1	0	0	1	2	1	1	4	3	1	1	5		
24	Vittoria Guazzini	Track cycling	2000	2022–2025	1	0	0	1	2	0	2	4	3	0	2	5		
25	Michela Moioli	Snowboarding	1995	2015–2026	1	2	1	4	1	3	3	7	2	5	4	11		
26	Chiara Cainero	Shooting	1978	2006–2016	1	1	0	2	1	3	5	8	2	4	6	10		
27	Mara Navarria	Fencing	1985	2011–2024	1	0	1	2	1	2	4	7	2	2	5	9		
28	Alice Bellandi	Judo	1998	2023–2025	1	0	0	1	1	1	1	3	2	1	1	4		
29	Andrea Vötter	Luge	1995	2023–2026	1	0	1	2	1	0	2	3	2	0	3	5		
29	Marion Oberhofer	Luge	2000	2023–2026	1	0	1	2	1	0	2	3	2	0	3	5		
31	Stefania Constantini	Curling	1999	2022–2026	1	0	1	2	1	0	0	1	2	0	1	3		
32	Marta Maggetti	Windsurfing	1996	2022–2024	1	0	0	1	1	0	0	1	2	0	0	2		
32	Federica Cesarini	Rowing	1996	2017–2021	1	0	0	1	1	0	0	1	2	0	0	2		
Others notables (at least one gold medal at the Olympics or World Championships and at least one medal in the other competition)
34	Deborah Gelisio	Shooting	1976	1993–2007	0	1	0	1	7	3	0	10	7	4	0	11		
35	Sofia Raffaeli	Artistic gymnastics	2004	2022–2024	0	0	1	1	6	4	5	15	6	4	6	16		
36	Dorina Vaccaroni	Fencing	1963	1982–1993	1	1	1	3	5	1	3	9	6	2	4	12		
37	Dorothea Wierer	Biathlon	1990	2014–2026	0	1	3	4	4	5	3	12	4	6	6	16		
38	Simona Quadarella	Swimming	1998	2017–2025	0	0	1	1	3	3	2	8	3	3	3	9		
39	Margherita Granbassi	Fencing	1979	2004–2008	0	0	2	2	3	2	0	5	3	2	2	7		
40	Manuela Di Centa (Note: She won two World Cup.)	Cross-country skiing	1964	1991–1998	2	2	3	7	0	4	3	7	2	6	6	14		
41	Fiona May (Note: Born in United Kingdom, but Italian for wedding.)	Athletics	1969	1995–2001	0	2	0	2	2	1	1	4	2	3	1	6		
42	Isolde Kostner	Alpine skiing	1975	1994–2002	0	1	2	3	2	1	0	3	2	2	2	6		
43	Antonella Bellutti	Track cycling	1968	1995–2000	2	0	0	2	0	2	0	2	2	2	0	4		
44	Emanuela Pierantozzi	Judo	1968	1989–2000	0	1	1	2	2	0	1	3	2	1	2	5		
45	Tania Cagnotto (Note: First Italian diver to win an olympic medals.)	Diving	1985	2005–2016	0	0	1	1	1	3	6	10	1	3	7	11		
46	Chiara Betti	Short-track	2002	2023–2026	1	1	0	2	0	2	1	1	1	3	1	5		
46	Alberta Santuccio	Fencing	1994	2020–2024	1	0	1	2	0	3	0	3	1	3	1	5		
48	Carolina Kostner	Figure skating	1987	2005–2014	0	0	1	1	1	2	3	6	1	2	4	7		
49	Vanessa Ferrari	Artistic gymnastics	1990	2006–2021	0	1	0	1	1	1	3	5	1	2	3	6		
50	Sofia Goggia	Alpine skiing	1992	2017–2026	1	1	1	3	0	1	1	2	1	2	2	5		
51	Elisa Confortola	Short-track	2002	2025–2026	1	1	0	2	0	1	0	1	1	2	0	3		
51	Sara Simeoni (Note: She was the world record holder in high jump) (Note: She was able top participate just 1 edition of World Championships, because it was not held before 1983.)	Athletics	1953	1976–1984	1	2	0	3	0	0	0	0	1	2	0	3		
53	Novella Calligaris (Note: First Italian swimmer to win an Olympic medal.)	Swimming	1954	1968–1973	0	1	2	3	1	0	2	3	1	1	4	6		
54	Odette Giuffrida	Judo	1994	2016–2024	0	1	1	2	1	0	1	2	1	1	2	4		
54	Antonella Palmisano	Athletics	1991	2017–2025	1	0	0	1	0	1	2	3	1	1	2	4		
54	Martina Grimaldi	Swimming	1988	2009–2013	0	0	1	1	1	1	1	3	1	1	2	4		
54	Tatiana Guderzo	Cycling	1984	2004–2018	0	0	1	1	1	1	1	3	1	1	2	4		
58	Alice D'Amato	Artistic Gymnastics	2003	2019–2024	1	1	0	2	0	0	1	1	1	1	1	3		
58	Irma Testa	Boxing	1997	2020–2023	0	0	1	1	1	1	0	2	1	1	1	3		
58	Antonella Ragno (Note: She won also 1 bronze at the Olympics and 3 bronze at the World Championships with the team.)	Fencing	1940	1960–1972	1	0	1	2	0	1	0	1	1	1	1	3		
58	Alessia Filippi	Swimming	1987	2008–2009	0	1	0	1	1	0	1	2	1	1	1	3		

== Summary by sport ==
=== Aquatics ===
==== Swimming ====
Italy first competed in swimming at the 1900 Games, with two swimmers in three events winning no medals.

Games	Swimmers	Events	Gold	Silver	Bronze	Total	Ranking
1900 Paris	2	3/7	0	0	0	0	–
1908 London	4		0	0	0	0	–
1912 Stockholm	2		0	0	0	0	–
1920 Antwerp	4		0	0	0	0	–
1924 Paris	6		0	0	0	0	–
1928 Amsterdam	5		0	0	0	0	–
1932 Los Angeles	2		0	0	0	0	–
1952 Helsinki	10		0	0	0	0	–
1956 Melbourne	7		0	0	0	0	–
1960 Rome	23		0	0	0	0	–
1964 Tokyo	16		0	0	0	0	–
1968 Mexico City	10		0	0	0	0	–
1972 Munich	24		0	1	2	3	9 =
1976 Montreal	13		0	0	0	0	–
1980 Moscow	13		0	0	0	0	–
1984 Los Angeles	26		0	0	0	0	–
1988 Seoul	21		0	0	1	1	20 =
1992 Barcelona	24		0	0	2	2	15
1996 Atlanta	14		0	0	1	1	19
2000 Sydney	21		3	1	2	6	4
2004 Athens	29		0	1	1	2	14 =
2008 Beijing	34		1	1	0	2	11 =
2012 London	35		0	0	1	1	19
2016 Rio de Janeiro	38		1	1	2	4	9
2020 Tokyo	36	32/37	0	2	5	7	14
2024 Paris	40	32/37	2	1	3	6	7
Total	–	–	7	7	17	31	15

=== Athletics ===
Italy first competed in athletics in 1900. After 121 years from first participation, Marcell Jacobs became the first Italian athlete to win a gold medal in Men's 100 metres at the Tokyo 2020 Summer Olympics on 1 August 2021, with a time of 9"80. In that Olympics, Italy had its best performance in athletics, winning five gold medals.

Games	Athletes	Events	Gold	Silver	Bronze	Total
1900 Paris	2	3/23	0	0	0	0
Total			19	15	26	60

=== Cycling ===
Italy first competed in cycling at the 1900 Games, with Enrico Brusoni winning a gold medal in the points race that year. Italy has the second-most gold medals (behind France) and third-most total medals (behind France and Great Britain) in the sport (as of the 2016 Games).

Games	Cyclists	Events	Gold	Silver	Bronze	Total
1900 Paris	7	2/3	1	0	0	1
Total			33	16	10	59

=== Equestrian ===
Italy competed in equestrian at the first Games in which the sport was held, in Paris 1900. Six riders competed, including Italy's first female Olympian (Elvira Guerra). Gian Giorgio Trissino won a gold medal in the high jump and a silver in the long jump.

Overall, Italy has won the eighth-most gold medals and eighth-most total medals in the sport.

Games	Riders	Events	Gold	Silver	Bronze	Total
1900 Paris	6	4/5	1	1	0	2
Total			7	9	7	23

=== Fencing ===
Italy first competed in fencing at the second edition of the Games in 1900. Italy has won more gold medals (49) and total medals (125) in the sport than any other nation. The nation's first medals were in its first appearance, as Italy's men's master sabreurs took gold and silver in that one-time-only event in 1900. Italy won six consecutive gold medals in the men's individual épée from 1932 to 1960 (including medal sweeps in 1936 and 1956), with a 7th in 2008; no other nation has more than 5 total gold medals (France) in the event.

Games	Fencers	Events	Gold	Silver	Bronze	Total
1900 Paris	8	6/7	1	1	0	2
Total			49	43	33	125

=== Gymnastics ===
Italy's first gymnastics appearance was when the nation sent one gymnast to the second Games in 1900; Camillo Pavanello finished 28th in the men's all-around, the only event held that Games.

Games	Cyclists	Events	Gold	Silver	Bronze	Total
1900 Paris	1	1/1	0	0	0	0
Total			14	5	9	28

=== Rowing ===
Games	No. Sailors	Events	Gold	Silver	Bronze	Total	Ranking
1896 Athens	Event wasn't held						
1900 Paris	0	0/5	0	0	0	0	
1904 St Louis	0	0/5	0	0	0	0	
1908 London	1	1/5	0	0	0	0	
1912 Stockholm	0	0/4	0	0	0	0	
1916	Games Cancelled						
1920 Antwerp	6	3/5	1	1	0	2	2
1924 Paris	17	3/7	0	1	1	2	7
1928 Amsterdam	26	7/7	1	0	1	2	4
1932 Los Angeles	20	4/7	0	2	1	3	5
1936 Berlin	22	5/7	0	2	0	2	4
1940	Games Cancelled						
1944	Games Cancelled						
1948 London	26	7/7	1	1	2	4	4
1952 Helsinki	26	7/7	0	0	0	0	
1956 Melbourne	22	5/7	1	0	0	1	4
1960 Rome	26	7/7	0	1	1	2	5
1964 Tokyo	18	3/7	0	1	0	1	7=
1968 Mexico City	14	4/7	1	0	1	2	4=
1972 Munich	21	4/7	0	0	0	0	
1976 Montreal	12	4/14	0	0	0	0	
1980	5	2/14	0	0	0	0	
1984 Los Angeles	23	7/14	1	0	0	1	6=
1988	28	7/14	2	0	0	2	
1992 Barcelona	21	5/14	0	1	1	2	7
1996 Atlanta	32	10/14	1	0	0	1	10
2000 Sydney	24	7/14	1	2	1	4	5
2004 Athens	30	9/14	0	0	3	3	19
2008 Beijing	19	7/14	0	1	0	1	14=
2012 London	20	7/14	0	1	0	1	11=
2016 Rio	27	8/14	0	0	2	2	16
2020 Tokyo	24	9/14	1	0	2	3	6=
2024 Paris	34	8/14	0	2	0	2	7
Total	544	264	11	16	16	43	10

=== Sailing ===
Games	No. Sailors	Events	Gold	Silver	Bronze	Total	Ranking
1896	Scheduled but event was not held						
1900	0	0/13	0	0	0	0	
1904	Not Scheduled						
1908	0	0/4	0	0	0	0	
1912	0	0/4	0	0	0	0	
1916	Games Cancelled						
1920	0	0/14	0	0	0	0	
1924	8	2/3	0	0	0	0	
1928	12	3/3	0	0	0	0	
1932	1	1/4	0	0	0	0	
1936	14	4/4	1	0	0	1	4
1940	Games Cancelled						
1944	Games Cancelled						
1948	15	5/5	0	0	0	0	
1952	14	5/5	1	0	0	1	3
1956	12	5/5	0	1	0	1	7
1960	11	5/5	0	0	1	1	8
1964	10	4/5	0	0	0	0	
1968	8	4/5	0	0	2	2	10
1972	10	5/6	0	0	0	0	
1976	12	6/6	0	0	0	0	
1980	6	3/6	0	0	1	1	9
1984	11	6/7	0	0	1	1	8
1988	15	8/8	0	0	0	0	
1992	14	9/10	0	0	0	0	
1996	16	10/10	0	0	1	1	19
2000	18	11/11	1	1	0	2	5
2004	18	11/11	0	0	1	1	15
2008	18	11/11	0	1	1	2	10
2012	11	8/10	0	0	0	0	
2016	13	9/10	0	0	0	0	
2020	9	6/10	1	0	0	1	5=
Total			4	3	8	15	13

=== Shooting ===
Italy's presence at the first Olympics in 1896 consisted of a single shooter, Giuseppe Rivabella, who entered one event and whose score and rank are unknown. The sport has remained a relatively strong one for Italy, which (after the 2016 Games) ranks fourth on the list of most gold medals in shooting with 16.

Games	Shooters	Events	Gold	Silver	Bronze	Total
1896 Athens	1	1/5	0	0	0	0
Total			16	15	11	42

=== Tennis ===
Italy competed in tennis in 1920 and 1924, after which tennis was dropped from the Summer Olympics due to rule disputes. The sport returned in 1988, when Italy resumed sending tennis players to compete. Prior to 2024, Uberto De Morpurgo was the only Italian tennis player to win a medal at the Olympics. At the 2024 Summer Olympics, Lorenzo Musetti became the first player in one hundred years to win a medal for Italy.

Games	Athletes	Events	Gold	Silver	Bronze	Total
1920 Antwerp	4	4/5	0	0	0	0
1924 Paris	5	5/5	0	0	1	1
1988 Seoul	5	2/4	0	0	0	0
1992 Barcelona	7	3/4	0	0	0	0
1996 Atlanta	4	2/4	0	0	0	0
2000 Sydney	1	1/4	0	0	0	0
2004 Athens	6	3/4	0	0	0	0
2008 Beijing	7	4/4	0	0	0	0
2012 London	7	5/5	0	0	0	0
2016 Rio	7	5/5	0	0	0	0
2020 Tokyo	6	4/5	0	0	0	0
2024 Paris	9	5/5	1	0	1	2
Total	—N/a	—N/a	1	0	2	3

== See also ==
- List of flag bearers for Italy at the Olympics
- Category:Olympic competitors for Italy
- Italy at the Paralympics
- Italy national athletics team
- Naturalized athletes of Italy
