= Italy at the 1896 Summer Olympics =

- IOC code: ITA

in Athens, Greece April 6, 1896 – April 15, 1896
- Competitors: 5 in 4 sports and 5 events
- Medals: Gold 0 Silver 0 Bronze 0 Total 0

Summer Olympics appearances (overview)
- 1896; 1900; 1904; 1908; 1912; 1920; 1924; 1928; 1932; 1936; 1948; 1952; 1956; 1960; 1964; 1968; 1972; 1976; 1980; 1984; 1988; 1992; 1996; 2000; 2004; 2008; 2012; 2016; 2020; 2024

Other related appearances
- 1906 Intercalated Games

Italy competed at the 1896 Summer Olympics, the first Olympics, in Athens, Greece, from 6 to 15 April 1896. The delegation consisted of five athletes due to compete in four sports and five events. However, Giuseppe Rivabella was the only one to able to compete. This was because one other competitor, Carlo Airoldi, was disqualified due to him receiving prize money in athletics events and him therefore not being an amateur. None of the others started. Italy did not win any medals during the Athens Olympics.

== Background ==
1896 was the first modern Olympic games and hence the appearance of Italy at the Athens Summer Olympics marked their first Olympic appearance. It took place from 6 to 15 April 1896. Italy did not win an Olympic medal at these Games. The delegation consisted of five athletes competing in four sports and five events. There were also supposed to be four others, but none of them started. However, Giuseppe Rivabella was the only one able to compete.

== Competitors ==
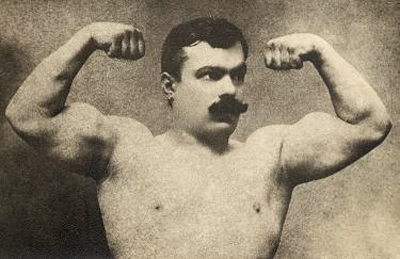
Airoldi in 1896

Out of the five athletes Rivabella was the only one able to compete. He was an Italian civil engineer, who worked in Athens and on Samos Island. While working on Samos, the locals described a “well-made thing” as a “ripabella” after him. Carlo Airoldi, a marathon runner, was disqualified due to him receiving prize money in athletics events and him therefore not being an amateur. Airoldi appealed because his prize money was not for winning, but for carrying one other runner to the end of the race as he was hurt. The money give was to pay for a train ride back to his home city and was as a reward for his help. He had walked to Athens from Milan for over 2000 kilometres. He did this because he was not able to pay for transport. Angelo Porciatti, full name Angelo Pietro Giuseppe Porciatti, was a cyclist who was also unable to compete, he was born on 1 July 1872 to a noble Lombard family. Giuseppe Caruso and Vincenzo Baroni were two fencers, both of whom did not start.

Sport	Men	Women	Total
Athletics	1	0	1
Cycling	1	0	1
Fencing	2	0	2
Shooting	1	0	1
Total	5	0	5

== Athletics ==
Airoldi did not start in the men's marathon event, as he was disqualified for not being an amateur.

Athlete	Event	Time	Rank
Carlo Airoldi	Men's marathon	DNS	

== Cycling ==
Porciatti was due to participate in the men's road race on 12 April, which was from Athens to Marathon and back, but did not start.

Athlete	Event	Time	Rank
Angelo Porciatti	Men's road race	DNS	

== Fencing ==
Caruso was due to compete in the men's foil event on 7 April, and the men's sabre event on 9 April, however he did not start in either. Baroni was also to participate in the same events but also did not start.

Athlete	Event	Time	Rank
Giuseppe Caruso	Men's foil	DNS	
Giuseppe Caruso	Men's sabre	DNS	
Vincenzo Baroni	Men's foil	DNS	
Vincenzo Baroni	Men's sabre	DNS	

== Shooting ==
Rivabella competed in the 200 metre military rifle event, on 9 and 10 April and in Kallithea. He placed somewhere between 14th and 19th place, with a score less than 845.

Athlete	Event	Hits	Score	Rank
Giuseppe Rivabella	200 m military rifle	Unknown	Unknown	14–19
