= Gravelotte (disambiguation) =

Gravelotte is a village and commune in the Moselle département, in France.

Gravelotte may also refer to:

- Gravelotte, Limpopo, in South Africa
- Eugène-Henri Gravelotte (1876-1939), a French fencer

== See also ==
- Battle of Gravelotte, August 18, 1870
