= Weightlifting at the 1896 Summer Olympics =

Weightlifting at the Olympics

Weightlifting at the Games of the I Olympiad
- Weightlifting pictogram
- Venue: Panathinaiko Stadium
- Date: 7 April 1896
- No. of events: 2 (2 men, 0 women)
- Competitors: 7 from 5 nations

At the 1896 Summer Olympics, two weightlifting events were contested (men's one hand lift and two hand lift). The top two places were won by the same two men in each event, though their order was reversed for the two events. The bronze medals were split by the two Greek weightlifters. A total of seven men from five nations competed.

== Medal summary ==
These medals are retroactively assigned by the International Olympic Committee; at the time, winners were given a silver medal and subsequent places received no award.

Event	Gold	Silver	Bronze
One hand lift	Launceston Elliot; Great Britain	Viggo Jensen; Denmark	Alexandros Nikolopoulos; Greece
Two hand lift	Viggo Jensen; Denmark	Launceston Elliot; Great Britain	Sotirios Versis; Greece

== Participating nations ==
A total of 7 weightlifters from 5 nations competed at the Athens Games:

- Denmark (1)
- Germany (1)
- Great Britain (1)
- Greece (3)
- Hungary (1)

== Medal table ==
These medals are retroactively assigned by the International Olympic Committee; at the time, winners were given a silver medal and subsequent places received no award.

Rank	Nation	Gold	Silver	Bronze	Total
1	Denmark	1	1	0	2
1	Great Britain	1	1	0	2
3	Greece	0	0	2	2
Totals (3 entries)		2	2	2	6

== See also ==
- List of Olympic medalists in weightlifting

== Sources ==
- Lampros, S.P.; Polites, N.G.; De Coubertin, Pierre; Philemon, P.J. & Anninos, C. (1897). The Olympic Games: BC 776 – AD 1896. Athens: Charles Beck. (Digitally available at)
- Mallon, Bill & Widlund, Ture (1998). The 1896 Olympic Games. Results for All Competitors in All Events, with Commentary. Jefferson: McFarland. ISBN 0-7864-0379-9. (Excerpt available at)
- Smith, Michael Llewellyn (2004). Olympics in Athens 1896. The Invention of the Modern Olympic Games. London: Profile Books. ISBN 1-86197-342-X.
