= Weightlifting at the 1896 Summer Olympics – Men's one hand lift =

Weightlifting at the Olympics

One hand lift at the Games of the I Olympiad
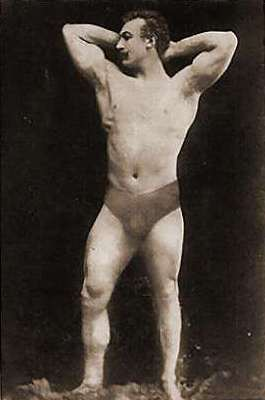
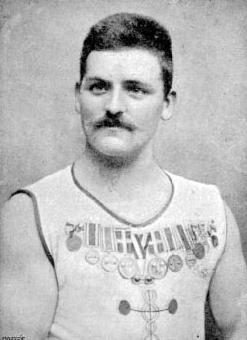
- Launceston Elliot (gold) Viggo Jensen (silver)
- Venue: Panathinaiko Stadium
- Date: 7 April 1896
- Competitors: 4 from 3 nations
- Winning weight: 71.0

Medalists
1st place, gold medalist(s)		Launceston Elliot; Great Britain
2nd place, silver medalist(s)		Viggo Jensen; Denmark
3rd place, bronze medalist(s)		Alexandros Nikolopoulos; Greece

The men's one hand lift, an event similar to the modern snatch, was one of two weightlifting events in the weightlifting at the 1896 Summer Olympics programme.

Viggo Jensen, injured from the first event, was able to lift only enough to earn a silver medal while Launceston Elliot far surpassed all of the other athletes in the field on his way to winning the United Kingdom's first gold medal of the Olympics.

Alexandros Nikolopoulos lifted 57.0 kilograms with one hand, which would have put him in a tie with Jensen had he lifted the same weight with his other hand. He lifted only 40.0 kilograms with the other, but was awarded third place as Sotirios Versis could only lift 40.0 with either hand.

Prince George of Greece and Denmark, one of the judges, demonstrated his strength after the event by moving one of the heavy weights with ease after an assistant struggled to clear the weight from the competition area.

== Background ==
This was the only appearance of this one hand lift event. Somewhat similar events were held in other early Games: an all-around dumbbell event was held in 1904 and there were two one-hand lifts (snatch and clean & jerk) as part of the 1924 combined events.

Top visiting weightlifters in Athens included Launceston Elliot and Lawrence Levy of Great Britain and Viggo Jensen of Denmark. Two Greek weightlifters competed as well. Levy withdrew after being informed that there would be no two-hand dumbbell event, though he served as a judge and assistant to Elliott.

== Competition format ==
In the second weightlifting event, held soon after the first, only one hand was allowed in lifting the weights. Lifters had to perform the lift with each hand successively. The technique was similar to the modern snatch event. Lifters received three attempts. Each lifter performed one attempt before any began their second attempts. After each had lifted three times, the top three received three more attempts.

== Schedule ==
Date		Time	Round
Gregorian	Julian	Time	Round
Tuesday, 7 April 1896	Tuesday, 26 March 1896		Final

== Results ==
Rank	Lifter	Nation	Weight (kg)
1st place, gold medalist(s)	Launceston Elliot	Great Britain	71.0
2nd place, silver medalist(s)	Viggo Jensen	Denmark	57.0
3rd place, bronze medalist(s)	Alexandros Nikolopoulos	Greece	57.0/40.0
4	Sotirios Versis	Greece	40.0
