= Weightlifting at the 1896 Summer Olympics – Men's two hand lift =

Weightlifting at the Olympics

Two hand lift at the Games of the I Olympiad
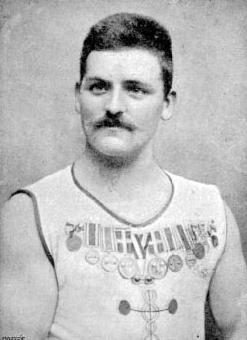
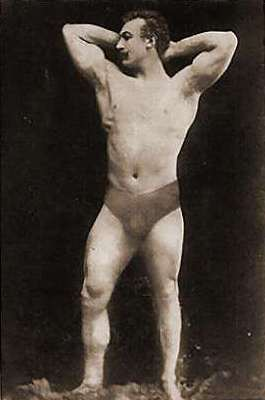
- Viggo Jensen (gold) Launceston Elliot (silver)
- Venue: Panathinaiko Stadium
- Date: 7 April 1896
- Competitors: 6 from 5 nations
- Winning weight: 111.5

Medalists
1st place, gold medalist(s)		Viggo Jensen; Denmark
2nd place, silver medalist(s)		Launceston Elliot; Great Britain
3rd place, bronze medalist(s)		Sotirios Versis; Greece

The men's two hand lift was one of two weightlifting events held as part of the Weightlifting at the 1896 Summer Olympics program. The two-handed lift was the first weightlifting event on 7 April. Six athletes took part. Viggo Jensen of Denmark and Launceston Elliot of the United Kingdom both lifted 111.5 kilograms, and the tie was broken by a determination by Prince George that Jensen had performed the lift with better form than had Elliot. A protest by the British delegation resulted in each athlete being given further attempts to improve their scores. Neither did, and the results stood as originally declared with Jensen taking the gold medal. Jensen had, however, suffered from the extra lifts in that he experienced a slight injury in trying to lift more than he was able.

== Background ==
This was the first of two appearances of this two hand lift event. It was held again in 1904.

Top visiting weightlifters in Athens included Launceston Elliot and Lawrence Levy of Great Britain and Viggo Jensen of Denmark. Two Greek weightlifters competed as well, along with German gymnast Carl Schuhmann and Hungarian tennis player Momčilo Tapavica. Levy withdrew from all weightlifting competitions after being told that there would be no two-hand dumbbell event, though he served as a judge and assistant to Elliott.

== Competition format ==
In the first weightlifting event, two hands were used in lifting the weights. The type of lift used was similar to the modern clean and jerk, using a barbell. Lifters received three attempts. Each lifter performed one attempt before any began their second attempts. After each had lifted three times, the top three received three more attempts. Ties were to be broken by judging the style of the lift, though after a British protest additional attempts were granted to the two men who tied.

== Schedule ==
Date		Time	Round
Gregorian	Julian	Time	Round
Tuesday, 7 April 1896	Tuesday, 26 March 1896	16:30	Final

== Results ==
Rank	Lifter	Nation	Weight (kg)
1st place, gold medalist(s)	Viggo Jensen	Denmark	111.5
2nd place, silver medalist(s)	Launceston Elliot	Great Britain	111.5
3rd place, bronze medalist(s)	Sotirios Versis	Greece	90.0
4	Georgios Papasideris	Greece	90.0
4	Carl Schuhmann	Germany	90.0
6	Momcsilló Tapavicza	Hungary	80.0
