= Georgios Valakakis =

Greek fencer

Georgios Valakakis was a Greek fencer. He competed at the 1896 and 1906 Summer Olympics.

Valakakis competed in the amateur foil event. He placed fourth of four in his preliminary group after losing all of his bouts, to Eugène-Henri Gravelotte, Konstantinos Komninos-Miliotis, and Athanasios Vouros. This put him in a tie for seventh overall, with Ioannis Poulos who was fourth in the other preliminary group.
