= Wrestling at the 1896 Summer Olympics – Men's Greco-Roman =

Wrestling at the Olympics

Men's Greco-Roman at the Games of the I Olympiad
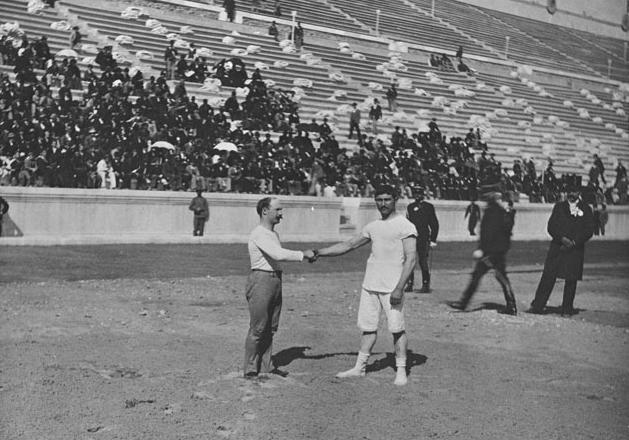
- Schuhmann (left) before the Olympic wrestling final, which he won
- Venue: Panathinaiko Stadium
- Dates: 10–11 April 1896
- Competitors: 5 from 4 nations

Medalists
1st place, gold medalist(s)		Carl Schuhmann; Germany
2nd place, silver medalist(s)		Georgios Tsitas; Greece
3rd place, bronze medalist(s)		Stephanos Christopoulos; Greece

The men's Greco-Roman was the only wrestling event on the Wrestling at the 1896 Summer Olympics programme.

No weight classes existed for the wrestling competition, held in the Panathinaiko Stadium which meant that there would only be one winner among competitors of all sizes. It was the only time that an open wrestling event was held; in 1904, when wrestling returned to the Olympic programme, weight classes were implemented.

The rules used were similar to modern Greco-Roman wrestling, although there was no time limit, and not all leg holds were forbidden (in contrast to current rules). Apart from the two Greek contestants, all competitors had previously been active in other sports. The wrestling competition was held on 10 April, except for the continuation of the final match on 11 April.

The tournament used ancient Greek single-elimination rules. There were no brackets as under modern single-elimination rules; instead, all participants in a round were paired off with one bye if a round had an odd number of participants left. This format could result in a semifinals round with only 3 competitors (as happened in both the 1896 wrestling and doubles tennis events, which started with 5 wrestlers/pairs: the first round had two matches, with one wrestler/pair having a bye, and the second round had only one match, with another wrestler/pair having a bye; a modern tournament would have had one match in the first round with three byes, leading to two semifinals).

== Standings ==
Rank	Wrestler	Nation
1st place, gold medalist(s)	Carl Schuhmann	Germany
2nd place, silver medalist(s)	Georgios Tsitas	Greece
3rd place, bronze medalist(s)	Stephanos Christopoulos	Greece
4	Launceston Elliot	Great Britain
4	Momcsilló Tapavicza	Hungary

== Bracket ==
Quarterfinals; 10 April
Fall
Carl Schuhmann (GER)
Launceston Elliot (GBR)
Stephanos Christopoulos (GRE)
Momcsilló Tapavicza (HUN)

Semifinals; 10 April
Georgios Tsitas (GRE)
Stephanos Christopoulos (GRE)

Final; 11 April
Fall
Carl Schuhmann (GER)
Georgios Tsitas (GRE)

== Competition summary ==
=== Quarterfinals ===
Stephanos Christopoulos of Greece faced Momcsilló Tapavicza of Hungary in the first match. The pair were nearly evenly matched, with Christopoulous declared the winner after Tapavicza retired due to injury.

In the second match, gymnastics champion Carl Schuhmann of Germany faced the weightlifting champion, Launceston Elliot of the United Kingdom. Schuhmann won easily.

Georgios Tsitas, a Greek, had a bye in the first round, joining Christopoulos and Schuhmann as the three semifinalists.

=== Semifinals ===
Schuhmann had a bye for the semifinals, so in the single semifinal match, the two Greeks, Tsitas and Christopoulos, faced off to be Schuhmann's opponent in the final.

Tsitas won after Christopoulous suffered a shoulder injury and was forced to retire; despite this, Christopoulous won the bronze medal.

=== Final ===
In the final, Tsitas faced Schuhmann, and the bout lasted 40 minutes before it had to be postponed on account of darkness, as the sun had begun to set.

On the next morning (11 April), Schuhmann and Tsitas returned to their match, and Schuhmann captured the victory shortly thereafter with a fall.
