= Swimming at the 1896 Summer Olympics – Men's sailors 100 metre freestyle =

Men's 100 metre freestyle for sailors at the Games of the I Olympiad
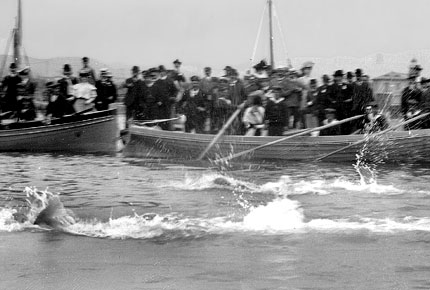
- Swimming at the 1896 Summer Olympics
- Venue: Bay of Zea
- Date: April 11
- Competitors: 3 from 1 nation
- Winning time: 2:20.4

Medalists
1st place, gold medalist(s)		Ioannis Malokinis; Greece
2nd place, silver medalist(s)		Spyridon Chazapis; Greece
3rd place, bronze medalist(s)		Dimitrios Drivas; Greece

The men's sailors 100 metre freestyle was one of the four swimming events on the Swimming at the 1896 Summer Olympics programme. The second swimming race was open only to sailors of the Greek Royal Navy. Eleven entered but only three actually took part in the event. The winning time was nearly a minute slower than that of the open 100 metre freestyle.

== Background ==
This was the only appearance of an event limited to Greek Royal Navy sailors. The exclusionary nature of this race is a rare phenomenon in the Olympic Games, which in general include only events open to all competitors; Bill Mallon, in his book about the 1896 Games, says of the event that "its inclusion in the Olympic records is dubious at best", a statement which is directly repeated on Olympedia. However, the competition is included in the International Olympic Committee's database of Olympic medalists, and there is no record of Pierre de Coubertin or any other major figure in the beginning of the modern Olympic movement objecting to the consideration of the race as Olympic.

== Competition format ==
This freestyle swimming competition involved a single race, with all swimmers competing at the same time. The swimmers were taken out by ship into the bay, where they would swim toward shore.

== Schedule ==
The 100 metre freestyle for sailors was the second of the swimming events, held shortly after the open 100 metre freestyle.

Date		Time	Round
Gregorian	Julian	Time	Round
Saturday, 11 April 1896	Saturday, 30 March 1896	11:00	Final

== Results ==
Rank	Swimmer	Nation	Time
1st place, gold medalist(s)	Ioannis Malokinis	Greece	2:20.4
2nd place, silver medalist(s)	Spyridon Chazapis	Greece	Unknown
3rd place, bronze medalist(s)	Dimitrios Drivas	Greece	Unknown
