= Fencing at the 1896 Summer Olympics – Men's foil =

Fencing at the Olympics

Men's foil at the Games of the I Olympiad
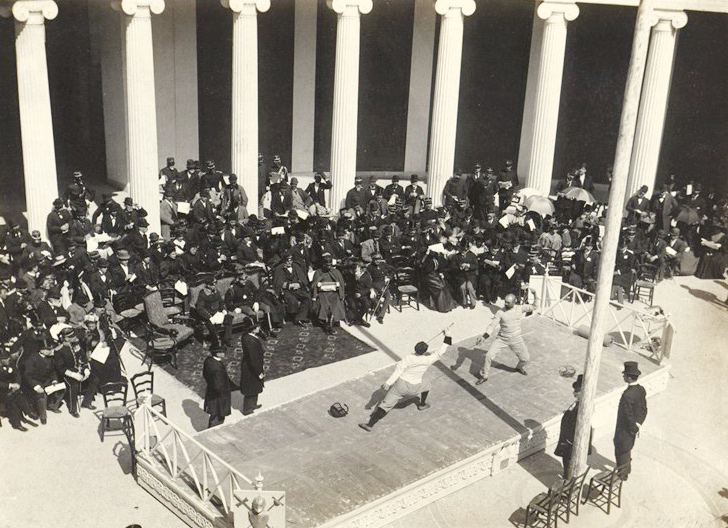
- A picture of two fencers performing The Grand Salute
- Venue: Zappeion
- Date: 7 April 1896
- Competitors: 8 from 2 nations

Medalists
1st place, gold medalist(s)		Eugène-Henri Gravelotte	France
2nd place, silver medalist(s)		Henri Callot	France
3rd place, bronze medalist(s)		Perikles Pierrakos-Mavromichalis	Greece
3rd place, bronze medalist(s)		Athanasios Vouros	Greece

The men's foil was one of three fencing events on the Fencing at the 1896 Summer Olympics programme. It was held on the second day of competition, 7 April. Eight fencers took part, with the preliminary fencing involving a round-robin held in two groups. The first group was Pierrakos-Mavromichalis, Delaborde, Callot, and Poulos. The second was Komninos-Miliotis, Balakakis, Gravelotte, and Vouros. The two fencers that were undefeated in their groups faced each other in the final for gold and silver medals, while Pierrakos-Mavromichalis and Vouros were awarded third place. Vouros's second win came from a forfeit by Komninos-Miliotis.

== Background ==
This was the first appearance of the event, which has been held at every Summer Olympics except 1908 (when there was a foil display only rather than a medal event).

== Competition format ==
The event featured a pool-play semifinals round followed by a single final. Each bout was to three touches. Standard foil rules were used, including that touches had to be made with the tip of the foil, the target area was limited to the torso, and priority determined the winner of double touches. One unusual rule was that the president could award a touch for an off-target strike if the defender had improperly obscured the target area. The pool round consisted of two pools of four fencers each, with each pool fencing a round-robin. The winner of each pool advanced to the final, which was a single bout between the two fencers.

== Schedule ==
The fencing began at 10 a.m. on the second day of events.

Date		Time	Round
Gregorian	Julian	Time	Round
Tuesday, 7 April 1896	Tuesday, 26 March 1896	10:00	Semifinals; Final

== Results ==
=== Semifinals ===
==== Semifinal A ====
The Official Report has de Laborde losing to Poulos, 3–1, but other sources indicate de Laborde won 3–2. The latter is shown below.

Pos	Fencer	W	L	TF	TA	Qual.	HC	PPM	HdL	IP
1	Henri Callot (FRA)	3	0	9	4	Q		3–1	3–1	3–2
3rd place, bronze medalist(s)	Perikles Pierrakos-Mavromichalis (GRE)	2	1	7	4		1–3		3–1	3–0
3	Henri de Laborde (FRA)	1	2	5	8		1–3	1–3		3–2
4	Ioannis Poulos (GRE)	0	3	4	9		2–3	0–3	2–3	

Source: Olympedia

==== Semifinal B ====
The match between Vouros and Komninos-Miliotis was forfeited by Komninos-Miliotis, sometimes credited as a 3–0 win for Vouros.

Pos	Fencer	W	L	TF	TA	Qual.	EHG	AV	KKM	GB
1	Eugène-Henri Gravelotte (FRA)	3	0	9	5	Q		3–2	3–2	3–1
3rd place, bronze medalist(s)	Athanasios Vouros (GRE)	2	1	8	4		2–3			3–1
3	Konstantinos Komninos-Miliotis (GRE)	1	2	5	7		2–3			3–1
4	Georgios Balakakis (GRE)	0	3	3	9		1–3	1–3	1–3	

Source: Olympedia

=== Final ===
In the final, the two undefeated Frenchmen faced each other. Gravelotte won in a close bout.

Pos	Fencer	W	L	TF	TA	EHG	HC
1st place, gold medalist(s)	Eugène-Henri Gravelotte (FRA)	1	0	3	1		3–1
2nd place, silver medalist(s)	Henri Callot (FRA)	0	1	1	3	1–3	

Source: Olympedia

== Final classification ==
The IOC website provides a full classification of the eight fencers. De Laborde is placed above Komninos-Miliotis, apparently due to Komninos-Miliotis not starting his bout against Vouros. It is unclear why Balakakis is placed above Poulos, who had a better touches for record.

Rank	Fencer	Nation
1st place, gold medalist(s)	Eugène-Henri Gravelotte	France
2nd place, silver medalist(s)	Henri Callot	France
3rd place, bronze medalist(s)	Periklis Pierrakos-Mavromichalis	Greece
3rd place, bronze medalist(s)	Athanasios Vouros	Greece
5	Henri de Laborde	France
6	Konstantinos Komninos-Miliotis	Greece
7	Georgios Balakakis	Greece
8	Ioannis Poulos	Greece
