= Ioannis Poulos =

Greek fencer

Ioannis Poulos was a Greek fencer. He competed at the 1896 Summer Olympics in Athens.

Poulos competed in the amateur foil event. He placed fourth of four in his preliminary group after losing all of his bouts, to Henri Callot, Henri Delaborde, and Periklis Pierrakos-Mavromichalis. This put him in a tie for seventh overall, with Georgios Balakakis who was fourth in the other preliminary group.
