= Alexandros Nikolopoulos (weightlifter) =

Greek weightlifter

Medal record

Men's weightlifting

Representing Greece

Olympic Games
Bronze medal – third place	1896 Athens	One hand lift

Alexandros Nikolopoulos (Greek: Αλέξανδρος Νικολόπουλος, 1875 in Athens, date of death unknown) was a Greek weightlifter. He competed at the 1896 Summer Olympics in Athens. In the one-handed event now known as the snatch, Nikolopoulos finished third out of the four lifters. He lifted 57.0 kilograms with one hand, matching the silver medallist Viggo Jensen, but could only manage 40.0 kilograms with the other, the same as fourth-place finisher Sotirios Versis.
