= Konstantinos Miliotis-Komninos =

Greek general

- Κωνσταντίνος Μηλιώτης-Κομνηνός
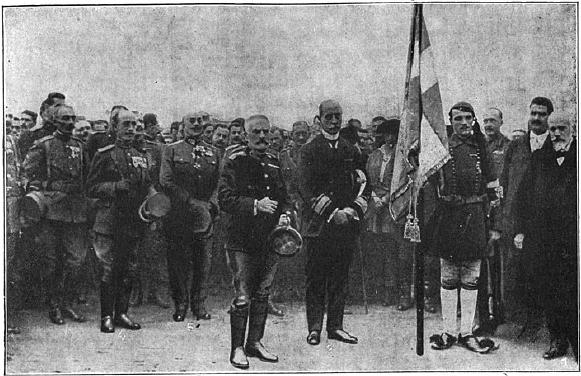
- Flag presentation to a newly formed unit of the Army of National Defence c. 1916; Miliotis-Komninos is second from left.
- Born: 1854; Ermoupolis, Kingdom of Greece
- Died: 12 June 1941 (aged 86–87); Athens, Hellenic State
- Military career
- Allegiance: Kingdom of Greece; (Greece) National Defence Government
- Branch: Hellenic Army
- Service years: 1877–1920
- Rank: Lieutenant General
- Commands: 6th Infantry Division; Army of Asia Minor
- Wars: Greco-Turkish War (1897); Balkan Wars; World War I Greco-Turkish War (1919–1922)
- Other work: Aide-de-camp to King George I of Greece; Olympic Athlete

Lieutenant general Konstantinos Miliotis-Komninos (Greek: Κωνσταντίνος Μηλιώτης-Κομνηνός, 1854–1941) was a Greek military officer and athlete . He was an amateur swordsman, competing in the 1896 Athens Olympics, and served in the Organizing Committee for the 1906 Intercalated Games. He also served as the aide-de-camp to King George I of Greece.

== Life and military career ==
Konstantinos Miliotis-Komninos was born in Ermoupolis in the island of Syros in 1854, and enlisted in the Hellenic Army on 11 April 1877 as a volunteer, serving in the cavalry. He fought in the Greco-Turkish War of 1897. In 1905, as a major, he was aide de camp to King George I of Greece, and was appointed an honorary Commander of the Royal Victorian Order.

During the Balkan Wars, he held the rank of Colonel and commanded the 6th Infantry Division. During the First World War, he supported the Venizelist Movement of National Defence, and became Minister of War in the provisional government on 6 December 1916. After the entry of Greece into the World War and the mobilization of the Greek Army, Konstantinos was appointed commander of Army Corps "B" (3 infantry divisions), which he commanded until the end of hostilities on the Thessaloniki Front.

In 1919, as a Lieutenant General, he became the first head of the Army of Asia Minor in the Smyrna Zone allocated to Greece by the Treaty of Sèvres, until the arrival of Lt. Gen. Leonidas Paraskevopoulos. He was dismissed from the Army on 29 November 1920, following the Venizelist defeat in the elections of the same month.

He was killed on 12 June 1941, shortly after the German occupation of Greece. He was mortally wounded in the head in a scuffle with a German sentry, who tried to prohibit his entrance in the Athens Club, which had been shut down by the German authorities due to its members' demonstrations of solidarity with British prisoners of war.

== Athletic career ==
He competed at the 1896 Summer Olympics in Athens. Komninos-Miliotis competed in the amateur foil event. He placed third of four in his preliminary group after winning one bout, against Georgios Balakakis, and losing the other two, to Eugène-Henri Gravelotte and Athanasios Vouros. This put him in a tie for fifth overall, with Henri Delaborde who was third in the other preliminary group.

He was also a member of the Olympic Games Commission in 1901–1916 and of the Organizing Committee for the 1906 Summer Olympics.
