= Sotirios Versis =

Athlete and weightlifter

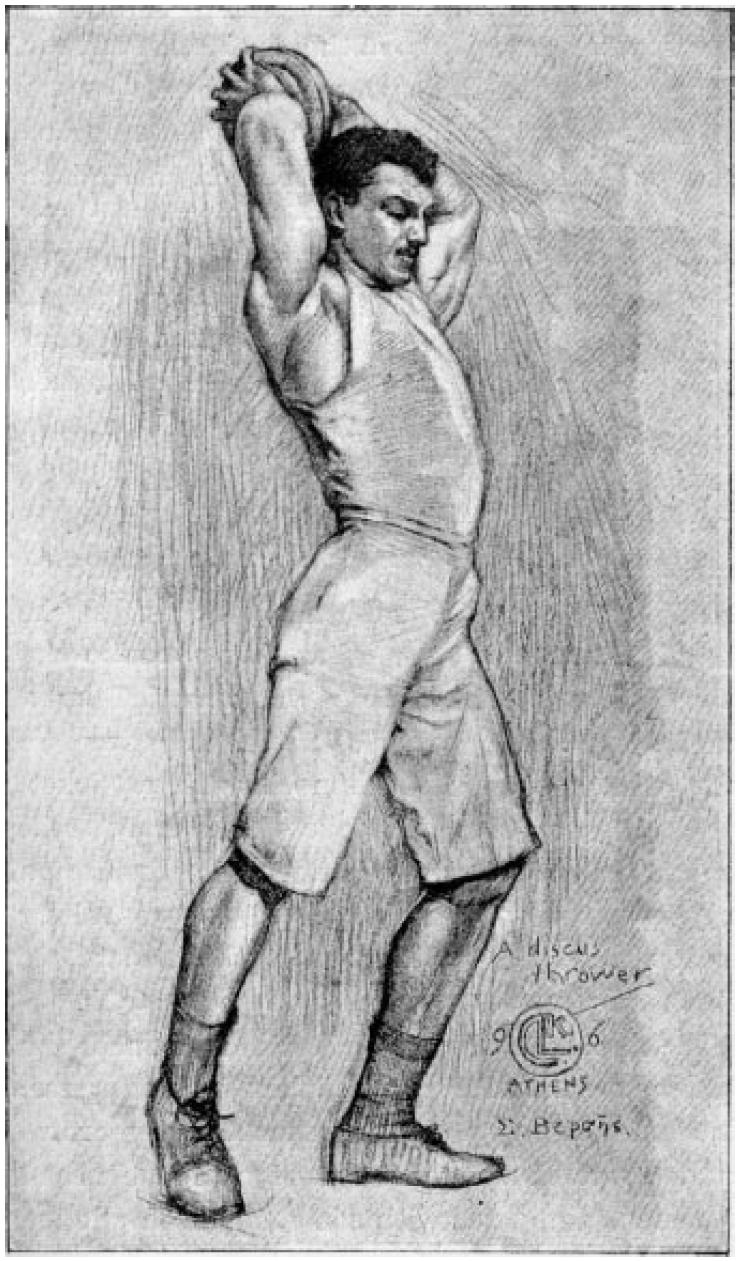
- Sotirios Versis, 1897, depicted as a discus thrower

Personal information
- Born: 1876 Athens, Greece
- Died: 1919 (aged 42–43)
Medal record
Olympic Games
Representing Greece
Men's athletics
| Bronze medal – third place | 1896 Athens | Discus throw |
Men's weightlifting
| Bronze medal – third place | 1896 Athens | Two hand lift |

Sotirios Versis (Greek: Σωτήριος Βερσής, 1876 in Athens, Greece – 1919) was a Greek athlete and weightlifter. He competed at the 1896 Summer Olympics in Athens and the 1900 Summer Olympics held in Paris.

Versis was born in Athens to a wealthy family, he studied at the Commercial Academy and worked as a stockbroker and was affiliated to Panellinios G.S.

At the 1896 Summer Olympics Versis competed in three events, two in weightlifting and one in athletics, on 6 April, the first day of the athletics, Versis competed in the discus event, where after throwing 27.78 metres he finished in third place behind American Robert Garrett and fellow Greek Panagiotis Paraskevopoulos, the next day he competed in two weightlifting events, the first event was the two hand lift, Versis lifted 90 kilograms and with having a better lifting style this gave him third place out of the six starters behind Viggo Jensen and Launceston Elliot, a little later that day he entered the one hand lift but he only managed to lift 40 kilograms and finished fourth out of the four starters.

Four years later, Versis returned to the Olympic scene when he competed at the 1900 Summer Olympics held in Paris, France, he was only entered in to one event which was the shot put, but Versis was not able to register any distance in his three throws and therefore didn't advance to the final.

After his athletics career finished he took up shooting and entered the 1912 Panhellenic Games.

Versis died in 1919 with what was reported as Asian Influenza.
