= Swimming at the 1896 Summer Olympics =

Swimming at the Games of the I Olympiad
- Venue: Bay of Zea
- Dates: 11 April 1896
- No. of events: 4
- Competitors: 13 from 4 nations

At the 1896 Summer Olympics, four swimming events were contested, all for men. They were planned and organized by the Sub-Committee for Nautical Sports. All events took place on 11 April in the Bay of Zea. There was a total of 13 participants from 4 countries competing.

== Medal table ==
Rank	Nation	Gold	Silver	Bronze	Total
1	Hungary	2	0	0	2
2	Greece	1	3	2	6
3	Austria	1	1	0	2
Totals (3 entries)		4	4	2	10

== Medal summary ==
These medals are retroactively assigned by the International Olympic Committee; at the time, winners were given a silver medal and subsequent places received no award.

Games	Gold	Silver	Bronze
100 m freestyle	Alfréd Hajós; Hungary OR	Otto Herschmann; Austria	not known
500 m freestyle	Paul Neumann; Austria	Antonios Pepanos; Greece	Efstathios Chorafas; Greece
1200 m freestyle	Alfréd Hajós; Hungary	Ioannis Andreou; Greece	not known
Sailors 100 m freestyle	Ioannis Malokinis; Greece	Spyridon Chazapis; Greece	Dimitrios Drivas; Greece

== Participating nations ==
A total of 13 swimmers from 4 nations competed at the Athens Games:

- Austria (2)
- Greece (9)
- Hungary (1)
- United States (1)

== Sub-Committee for Nautical Sports ==
- Prince George of Greece, president
- Pavlos Damalas, secretary
- Dimitrios Kriezis
- Konstantinos Sachtouris
- Georgios Koundouriotis
- Dimitrios Argyropoulos
- Konstantinos Kanaris
- K. Argyrakis
