= Henri de Laborde =

French fencer

Henri de Laborde was a French fencer. He competed at the 1896 Summer Olympics in Athens and the 1900 Summer Olympics.

In 1896, de Laborde competed in the amateur foil event. He placed third of four in his preliminary group after winning one bout, against Ioannis Poulos, and losing the other two, to Henri Callot and Periklis Pierrakos-Mavromichalis. This put him in a tie for fifth overall, with Konstantinos Komninos-Miliotis who was third in the other preliminary group.
