= Georgios Tsitas =

Greek wrestler

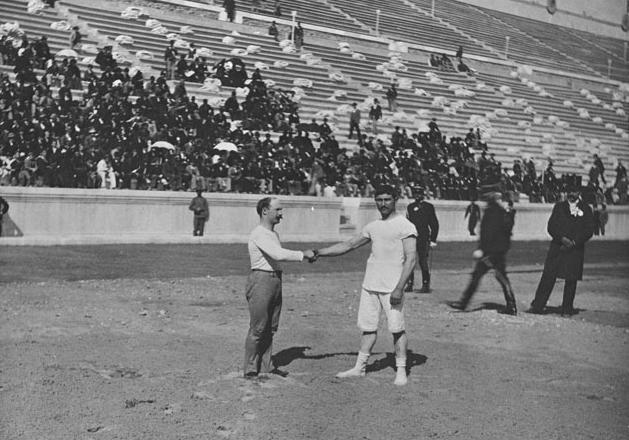
- Georgios Tsitas (right) with Carl Schuhmann

Medal record

Men's wrestling

Representing Greece

Olympic Games
| Silver medal – second place | 1896 Athens | Greco-Roman |

Georgios Tsitas (Greek: Γεώργιος Τσίτας, born 1872 in Smyrna, died between 1940 and 1945) was a Greek wrestler. He competed at the 1896 Summer Olympics in Athens.

In the first round of the wrestling competition, held in a roughly Greco-Roman format, Tsitas had a bye to guarantee a top three finish before he even had a match. The semifinal pitted Tsitas against fellow Greek Stephanos Christopoulos. Tsitas won the match by throwing Christopoulos. In the final, Tsitas wrestled with Carl Schuhmann of Germany, an exceptional gymnast, for 40 minutes before the match was postponed due to darkness. Tsitas did not last long the following day, being defeated to finish in second place.

== Personal life ==
George Tsitas was born in 1872 in Smyrna but his family had settled in Athens. He was an athlete in the Panellinios G.S. The press of the time reports that his wrestling teacher was Panagis Koutalianos. He had a bakery-confectionery, in the Panhellenic world he had the reputation of "humorist Hercules".
