= Ioannis Malokinis =

Greek swimmer

Personal information
- Born: 1880 Piraeus, Greece
- Died: 1942 (aged 61–62)

Sport
- Sport: Swimming
Medal record
Representing Greece
Olympic Games
Gold medal – first place	1896 Athens	Sailors 100 m freestyle

Ioannis Malokinis (Greek: Ιωάννης Μαλοκίνης, 1880 – 1942) was a Greek swimmer. He competed at the 1896 Summer Olympics in Athens. His home island was Spetses. Malokinis competed in the 100 metres freestyle for sailors event. He placed first of three swimmers, with a time of 2:20.4. This time was nearly a minute slower than the mark of 1:22.2 set by Alfréd Hajós in the open 100 metres event.
