= Athanasios Vouros =

Greek fencer

Medal record

Men's fencing

Representing Greece

Olympic Games
Bronze medal – third place	1896 Athens	Foil

Athanasios Vouros (Greek: Αθανάσιος Βούρος) (1871 – 14 May 1959) was a Greek fencer. He competed at the 1896 Summer Olympics in Athens. He was born in Athens.

Vouros competed in the foil event. He placed second of four in his preliminary group after winning his match against Georgios Balakakis, losing to Eugène-Henri Gravelotte, and winning by forfeit against Konstantinos Komninos-Miliotis. Because he had only won one actual bout, Vouros was considered to have won fourth place behind Perikles Pierrakos-Mavromichalis, who had placed second in his preliminary group but had won two bouts without forfeits. However, nowadays appears as having won also the third place and a bronze medal.
