= Henri Callot =

French fencer (1875–1956)

Olympic medal record

Men's Fencing

Representing France
| Silver medal – second place | 1896 Athens | Foil |

Eugène Henri Callot (French: [ɑ̃ʁi kalo]; 20 December 1875 – 22 December 1956) was a French fencer. He competed at the 1896 Summer Olympics in Athens. He was born in La Rochelle.

Callot won the silver medal in the amateur foil event. He went undefeated in his preliminary round group, defeating Henri Delaborde, Periklis Pierrakos-Mavromichalis, and Ioannis Poulos. He then faced fellow Frenchman Eugène-Henri Gravelotte, who had gone undefeated in the other preliminary group, in a final match. There, he lost to Gravelotte 3–2.

He was also a student of Jules Lefebvre and Joseph-Nicolas Robert-Fleury. He exhibited at the Salon des artistes français, of which he was a member from 1898.

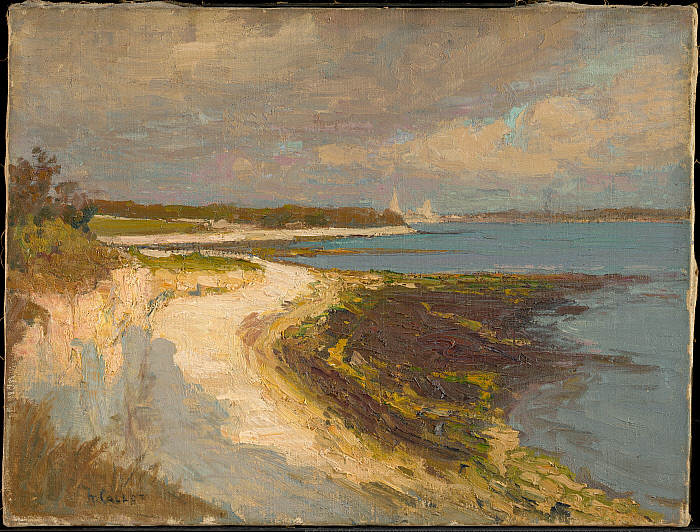
Port of La Rochelle (1905), oil on canvas, Clark Art Institute

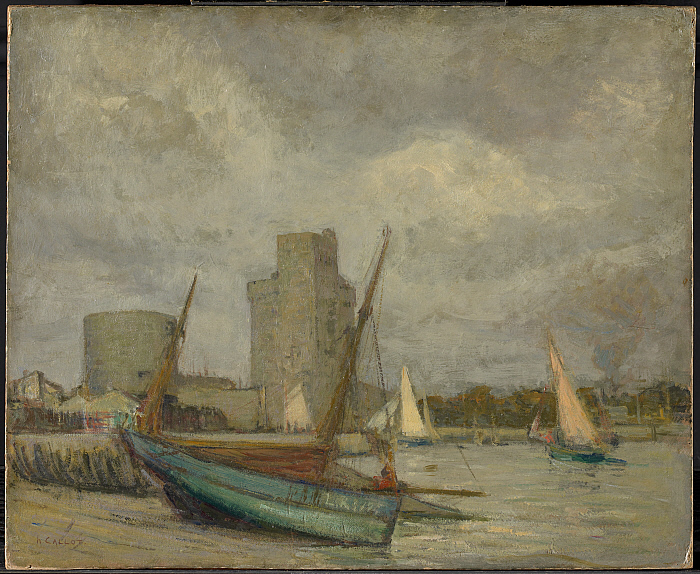
Harbor Scene (1905), oil on laminate cardboard, Clark Art Institute

Callot died in Paris on 22 December 1956, aged 80.
