= Spyridon Chazapis =

Greek swimmer

Personal information
- Born: 1872 Andros, Kingdom of Greece

Sport
- Sport: Swimming
Medal record
Representing Greece
Olympic Games
Silver medal – second place	1896 Athens	Sailors 100 m freestyle

Spyridon P. "Spyros" Chazapis (Greek: Σπυρίδων "Σπύρος" Χαζάπης; born 1872, date of death unknown) was a Greek swimmer. He competed at the 1896 Summer Olympics in Athens. Chazapis competed in the 100 metres freestyle for sailors event. He placed second of the three swimmers.
