= Fencing at the 1896 Summer Olympics =

Fencing at the Games of the I Olympiad
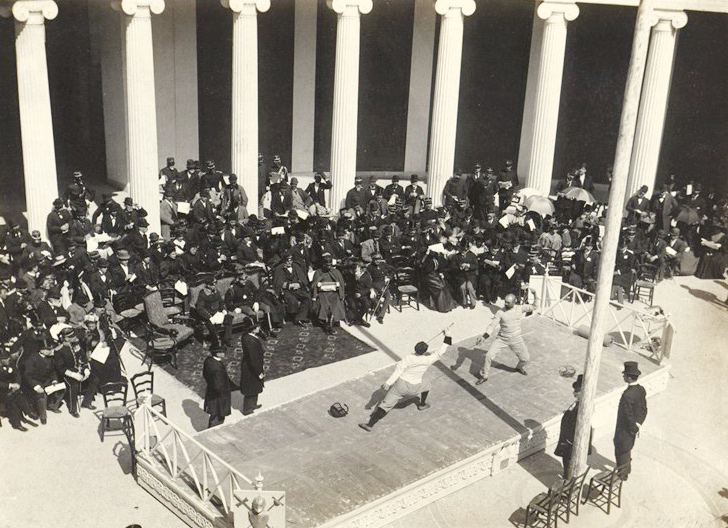
- The final sword match 1896 Summer Olympics
- Venue: Zappeion
- Dates: 7–9 April 1896
- No. of events: 3 (3 men, 0 women)
- Competitors: 15 from 4 nations

At the 1896 Summer Olympics, three fencing events were contested at the Zappeion. They were prepared and organized by the Sub-Committee for Fencing. The épée event for men was cancelled. All fencing was done to three touches. Events were held on 7 April and 9 April 1896. 15 athletes from four nations competed; 8 fencers from 3 nations won one medal each.

== Medal summary ==
These medals are retroactively assigned by the International Olympic Committee; at the time, winners were given a silver medal.

Event	Gold	Silver	Bronze
Foil	Eugène-Henri Gravelotte; France	Henri Callot; France	Periklis Pierrakos-Mavromichalis; Greece
Foil	Eugène-Henri Gravelotte; France	Henri Callot; France	Athanasios Vouros; Greece
Masters foil	Leonidas Pyrgos; Greece	Joanni Perronet; France	none
Sabre	Ioannis Georgiadis; Greece	Telemachos Karakalos; Greece	Holger Nielsen; Denmark

== Participating nations ==
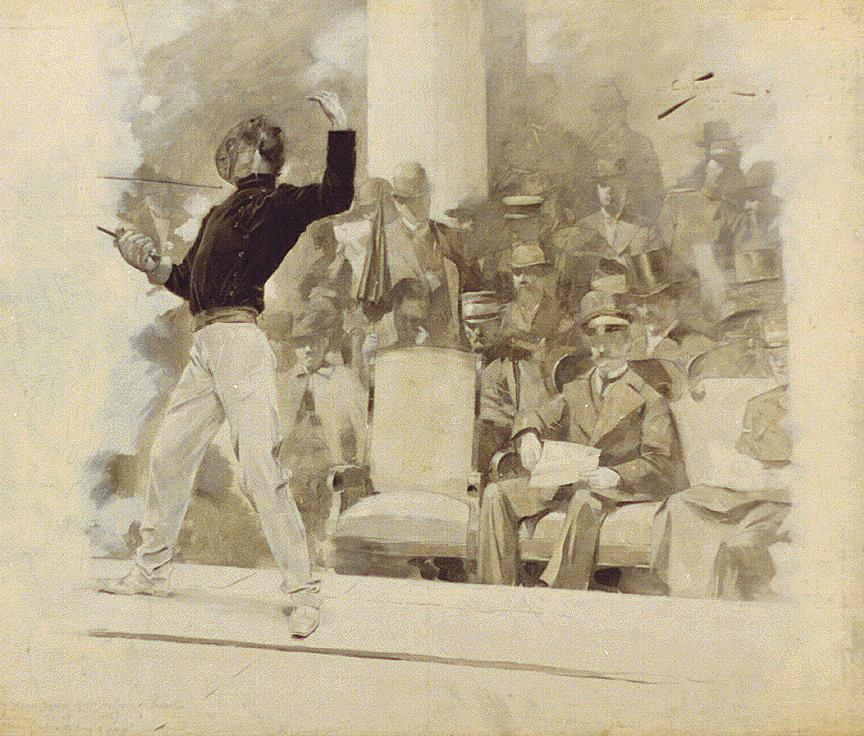
Fencing before the king of Greece, 1896, by André Castaigne

A total of 15 fencers from four nations competed at the Athens Games:

- Austria (1)
- Denmark (1)
- France (4)
- Greece (9)

== Medal table ==
Rank	Nation	Gold	Silver	Bronze	Total
1	Greece	2	1	2	5
2	France	1	2	0	3
3	Denmark	0	0	1	1
Totals (3 entries)		3	3	3	9

== Sub-Committee for Fencing ==
- Ioannis Phokianos, president
- Georgios Streit, secretary
- Ioannis Yenissarlis
- Loukas Belos
- Nikolaos Politis
- Chas. Waldstein
- Dimitrios Aiginitis
- Dimitrios Sekkeris
- Spyridon Koumoundouros
- Konstantinos Manos
- Spyridon Antonopoulos

== See also ==
- List of Olympic medalists in fencing (men)
- List of Olympic medalists in fencing (women)
