= Giuseppe Rivabella =

Italian sports shooter

Giuseppe Rivabella (1855 or 1856 in Fubine – 24 August 1919 in Capri) was an Italian shooter. He competed at the 1896 Summer Olympics in Athens. Rivabella competed in the military rifle event. His score and place in the competition are unknown, but he was not among the top 13 of the 42 shooters that competed.

His presence is proof that Italy competed at the first Olympic Games. Due to the refusal of Carlo Airoldi's request to participate, it was thought that Italy had no representatives. In 2004, however, a rediscovered Italian Navy report revealed this new figure. Rivabella was an Italian living in Athens and working in Samos as a civil engineer.
