= Stephanos Christopoulos =

Greek wrestler

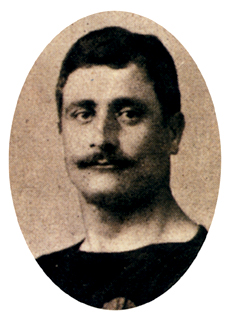

Personal information
- Born: 1876 Patras, Kingdom of Greece
- Died: Unknown

Sport
- Country: Greece
- Sport: Wrestling
Medal record
Men's wrestling
Representing Greece
Olympic Games
Bronze medal – third place	1896 Athens	Greco-Roman

Stephanos Christopoulos (Greek: Στέφανος Χρηστόπουλος; 1876) was a Greek wrestler. He was a member of Gymnastiki Etaireia Patron, that merged in 1923 with Panachaikos Gymnastikos syllogos to become Panachaiki Gymnastiki Enosi.

Christopoulos competed at the 1896 Summer Olympics in Athens. He defeated Momcsilló Tapavicza of Hungary in the first bout of the wrestling competition, matching the Hungarian in skill and wearing the other wrestler down until he conceded the match. In the semifinal, Christopoulos faced fellow Greek Georgios Tsitas. The result of that match was an injured shoulder and a loss for Christopoulos when Tsitas threw him. He finished third behind Tsitas and the German Carl Schuhmann, winning the bronze medal.

Christopoulos returned to the competitive stage in Athens ten years later to compete in the 1906 Intercalated Games, he entered three events, his first event was in the weightlifting the two handed lift, he managed to lift 108.5 kilogrammes and finished in tied for seventh place, he also competed in the one handed lift but only lifted 40 kilogrammes and finished eleventh out of the 12 starters. He also entered the Wrestling in the heavyweight division, he won his first round against Austrian, Rudolf Arnold, in the next round he lost to Marcel Dubois from Belgium.
