= Eugène-Henri Gravelotte =

French fencer (1876–1939)

Olympic medal record

Men's fencing

Representing France
| Gold medal – first place | 1896 Athens | Foil |

Eugène-Henri Gravelotte (6 February 1876 – 23 August 1939) was a French fencer. He was the first modern Olympic champion in foil and first French gold medalist, winning the event at the 1896 Summer Olympics in Athens. He was born in Paris.

Gravelotte was undefeated in his group for the preliminary round, defeating Greek fencers Athanasios Vouros, Konstantinos Komninos-Miliotis, and Georgios Balakakis in succession. He then faced fellow Frenchman Henri Callot, who had gone undefeated in the other group, in the final. Gravelotte won that match 3–2.

Gravelotte died in Bénodet on 23 August 1939, aged 63.
