= Carlo Airoldi =

Italian marathon runner

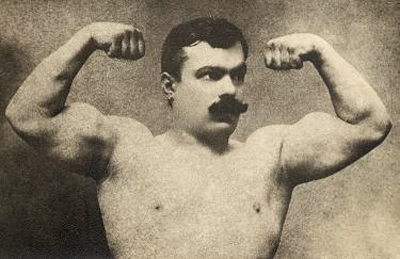
Carlo Airoldi

Carlo Airoldi (21 September 1869 in Origgio – 18 June 1929 in Milan) was an Italian marathon runner, famous for walking to the 1896 Olympics.

== Early life ==
Airoldi was born in Origgio near Saronno, to a farming family. He began to participate in sporting contests in the territory of Varese (the first documented occasion was at Gorla Minore) and later at national and international contests where he outdid his major rival of the time, Louis Ortègue of Marseilles. In 1892 he won in the Lecco-Milano; followed by a victory in the Milano-Torino. He became famous very quickly and was one of the foremost marathon runners of his time. His biggest success was the victory in the Milano-Barcelona (September 1895), a competition in 12 legs over a total of 1050 km. This victory brought him 2000 pesetas.

== The Olympics ==
Airoldi sought to participate in the Athens Olympics of 1896 and he had a good chance of victory. He needed money, however, to get to the Greek capital. He sought money from the director of a well known magazine of the time - "La Bicicletta", and Airoldi proposed to travel cheaply. He would go on foot through Austria, Turkey and Greece - an adventurous journey that forced him to cover 70 km per day in order to arrive in Athens on time. The magazine was to document all the stages of his journey and help supply him with the necessary information.

The magazine accepted and his journey began. The stage from Milan to Split, passing through Trieste and Fiume, met with no problems. Airoldi had intended to pass along the Croatian coast then through Kotor and Corfu. Unfortunately, before arriving at Dubrovnik he fell and hurt his hand and was forced to spend two days in a tent. He was advised against crossing Albania on foot so he boarded an Austrian boat that took him to Patras from where he continued to Athens on foot following the railway lines as there were no roads.

After his 28-day journey Airoldi was unfortunately not able to compete in the marathon. He went to the royal palace to sign up for the games where he was questioned by the head of the Olympic Committee. He decided that the money received for winning the Milano-Barcelona competition meant that Airoldi was considered a professional athlete and thus not eligible to compete. Telegrams were sent from Italy but nothing worked: Airoldi was not allowed to participate. There was a strong feeling in Italy that the organizers were not allowing a strong competitor to take part in a race that the Greeks wanted to win. Airoldi never accepted the decision and issued a challenge to Spiridon Louis - the winner of the marathon - that was never taken up.

== His later years ==
On his return home, Airoldi attempted many times to beat the record of Spiridon Louis without ever succeeding. He continued to race mainly in Lombardy and Switzerland, where he was married and worked (he worked in Berne and Zurich). Finally he moved to South America to seek his fortune.

== See also ==
- Athletics at the 1896 Summer Olympics

== Bibliography ==
- Manuel Sgarella, La leggenda del maratoneta, Macchione Editore
