= Dimitrios Drivas =

Greek swimmer

Personal information
- Born: Spetses, Greece

Sport
- Sport: Swimming
Medal record
Representing Greece
Olympic Games
Bronze medal – third place	1896 Athens	Sailors 100 m freestyle

Dimitrios Drivas was a Greek swimmer best known for competing at the 1896 Summer Olympics in Athens. He was born in Spetses.

Drivas competed in the 100 metres freestyle for sailors event, which was for the Greek Navy only, eleven sailors entered but only three started, Drivas came last out of the three and still won a bronze medal.
