= Viggo Jensen =

Danish sportsman

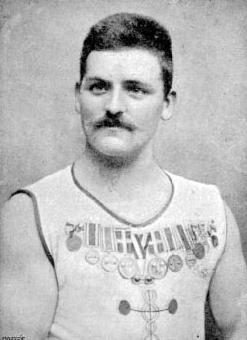
- Jensen, c. 1900

Personal information
- Full name: Alexander Viggo Jensen
- Born: 22 June 1874 Copenhagen, Denmark
- Died: 2 November 1930 (aged 56) Copenhagen, Denmark

Gymnastics career
- Discipline: Men's artistic gymnastics
- Country represented: Denmark
Medal record
Representing Denmark
Olympic Games
Men's weightlifting
Gold medal – first place	1896 Athens	Two hand lift
Silver medal – second place	1896 Athens	One hand lift
Men's shooting
Bronze medal – third place	1896 Athens	Free rifle

Alexander Viggo Jensen (22 June 1874 – 2 November 1930) was a Danish weightlifter, sport shooter, gymnast, and athlete. He was the first Danish and Nordic Olympic champion, at the 1896 Summer Olympics in Athens.

The first weightlifting event held was the two-handed lift, in a style now known as the clean and jerk. Jensen and Launceston Elliot of Great Britain and Ireland finished the competition tied at 111.5 kilograms, though the judges declared Jensen had performed the lift with better form and would be awarded first place. The British delegation protested, resulting in more attempts being given to both lifters to improve their scores. Neither did, and therefore Jensen retained first place, but he had injured his shoulder in the extra attempts.

That injury hampered Jensen's efforts in the one-handed lift, the snatch. He was able to lift only 57.0 kilograms to Elliot's 71.0 kilograms, taking second place in the event. Jensen competed in the shot put, placing fourth. He was not among the top four in the discus throw, placing sixth.

In the gymnastics competitions, Jensen entered the rope climbing event. He did not finish the climb, placing fourth behind the two Greeks who did reach the top of the 14 metre rope and Fritz Hofmann, who had gotten higher than Jensen. He was ahead of Launceston Elliot in the event.

He also competed in the two rifle events. In the military rifle, Jensen placed sixth with a score of 1,640 points and 30 hits of 40 shots. The free rifle was more successful for him, as he finished third with 1,305 points on 31 hits. His scores for each string of 10 shots were 392, 423, 280, and 210.
