= Launceston Elliot =

Scottish weightlifter

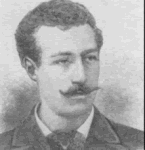

Personal information
- Nationality: British
- Born: 9 June 1874 Hubli, Karnataka, British India
- Died: 8 August 1930 (aged 56) Melbourne, Australia
- Resting place: Fawkner Cemetery, Melbourne, Australia

Sport
- Country: Great Britain
- Sport: Weightlifting
Medal record
Event	1st	2nd	3rd
Olympic Games	1	1	0
Total	1	1	0
Men's Weightlifting
Representing Great Britain
Olympic Games
Gold medal – first place	1896 Athens	One hand lift
Silver medal – second place	1896 Athens	Two hand lift

Launceston Elliot (9 June 1874 – 8 August 1930) was a British weightlifter, and the first athlete representing the United Kingdom to become an Olympic champion.

== Biography ==
Launceston Elliot was conceived in Launceston, Tasmania, Australia, after which he was named, but before his birth his family moved to India and he was born in Kaladagi and baptised at Guledgudda, now in Karnataka State. His family was an established part of the Scottish aristocracy with Lord Minto being head of the family which had strong connections with India. The 4th Earl Minto served as Viceroy of India (1905–10). Launceston Elliot was the grandson of Sir Charles Elliot, the onetime governor of Saint Helena, and his father Gilbert Wray Elliot served as magistrate with the Indian Civil Service.

In 1887, Elliot's father gave up his post in India and took his family to England where he began farming in Essex. The 13-year-old Launceston, an exceptionally well-built youth, who was seeing England for the first time, immediately came under the influence of the great Eugen Sandow and soon developed into an unusually talented lifter. In January 1891, aged only 16, he performed creditably at what is now recognised as the first British Championships held at the fashionable Café Monico in Piccadilly, London. Three years later he was the winner of the championships at the Royal Aquarium, Westminster.

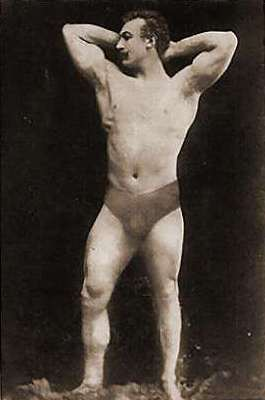
Elliot on a postcard from 1910

Continuing success encouraged the 21-year-old Elliot to travel to Athens for the first modern Olympic Games. At the time, there were no internationally accepted rules or classifications for weightlifting and the 1896 Olympics added further to the huge variety of classes contested on the contemporary scene. The two-handed lift came first on the program and, after a long drawn out contest, Viggo Jensen of Denmark and Elliot had both lifted 111.5 kilograms, but Prince George awarded the Dane first place for having done so in better style. Jensen's lift was accomplished with a superb clean lift whereas Elliot had certainly encountered difficulty. By contrast, the one-handed event was a short, sharp event. Elliot declined Prince George's courteous offer of a rest break but he asked that he might this time lift after Jensen, as in the two-handed event the Dane had the advantage of lifting after Elliot. The request was granted although the order of lifting was not to have a material effect on the result. Elliot raised 71.0 kilograms without difficulty whereas Jensen, who had injured his shoulder trying to raise 112.5 kilograms in the two-handed event, could only manage 57.0 kilograms and Britain's first Olympic champion was crowned.

Elliot also competed in the 100 metres in the athletics programme. He placed third in his heat and did not advance to the final. In the wrestling event, Elliot was defeated in the first round by Carl Schuhmann of Germany, the gymnastics champion.

He finished last of the five competitors in the rope climbing event on the gymnastics program.

Following his victory in Athens, he set four new records at the 1899 Amateur Championships and, as a prominent figure on the British weightlifting scene, his financial success was virtually assured. He also competed at the 1900 Summer Olympics, throwing the discus and placing eleventh (no weightlifting events were held that year). In 1903 he turned professional. After his retirement Elliot carried on farming in England for a few years before settling in Melbourne in 1923. He died of cancer of the spine on 8 August 1930 aged 56 and is buried in Melbourne's Fawkner Cemetery.

Photographs of Launceston Elliot are featured among the distinguished Scottish athletes in the sport section of the Scottish National Portrait Gallery, Edinburgh (re-opened after a major refurbishment in 2011).
