= Panathenaic Stadium =

Stadium in Athens, Greece

- Kallimarmaro

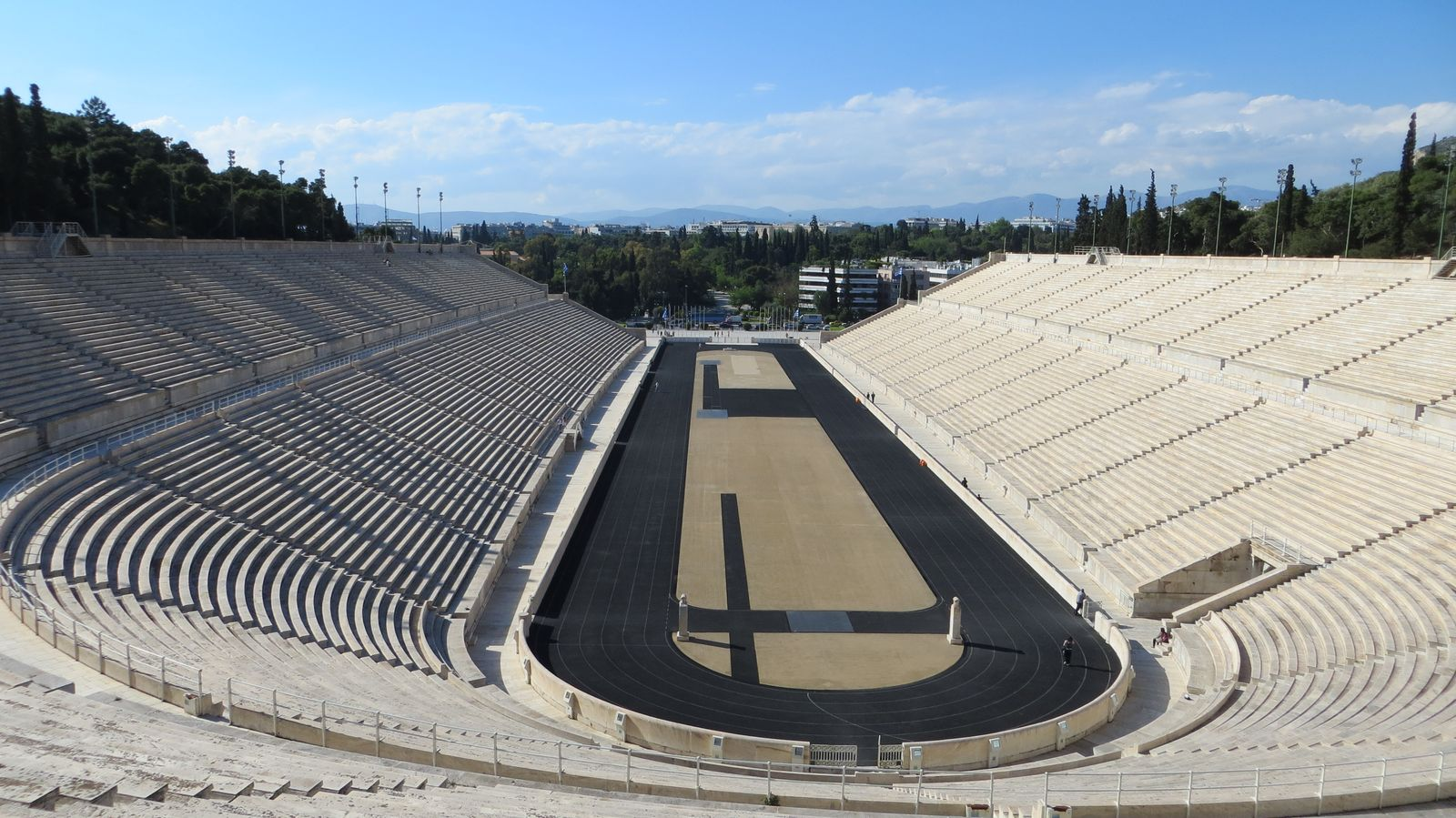
- Panathenaic Stadium in 2014
- Interactive map of Panathenaic Stadium
- Location: Pangrati, Athens, Greece
- Coordinates: 37°58′6″N 23°44′28″E
- Owner: Hellenic Olympic Committee
- Capacity: 144 AD: 50,000; 1896: 60,000
- Record attendance: 70,000 (AEK Athens vs Slavia VŠ Praha, 1968)
- Public transit: Zappio tram stop

Construction
- Built: 6th century BC (racecourse) c. 330 BC (in limestone by Lykourgos) c. 144 AD (in marble by Herodes Atticus)
- Renovated: 1896
- Architect: Anastasios Metaxas (1896 renovation)

The Panathenaic Stadium (Greek: Παναθηναϊκό Στάδιο, romanized: Panathinaïkó Stádio, [panaθinai̯ˈko ˈstaðio]) (Note: Ancient Greek: στάδιον Παναθηναικόν, romanized: stádion Panathēnaikón, as spelled by Philostratus.) or Kallimarmaro (Καλλιμάρμαρο [kaliˈmaɾmaɾo], lit. 'beautiful marble') is a multi-purpose stadium in Athens, Greece. One of the main historic attractions of Athens, it is the only stadium in the world built entirely of marble.

A stadium was built on the site of a simple racecourse by the Athenian statesman Lykourgos (Lycurgus) c. 330 BC, primarily for the Panathenaic Games. It was rebuilt in marble by Herodes Atticus, an Athenian Roman senator, by 144 AD. It had a capacity of 50,000 seats. After the rise of Christianity in the 4th century it was largely abandoned. The stadium was excavated in 1869 and hosted the Zappas Olympics in 1870 and 1875. After being refurbished, it hosted the opening and closing ceremonies of the first modern Olympics in 1896 and was the venue for 4 of the 9 contested sports. It was used for various purposes in the 20th century and was once again used as an Olympic venue in 2004. It is the finishing point for the annual Athens Classic Marathon. It is also the last venue in Greece from where the Olympic flame handover ceremony to the host nation takes place.

== Location ==
The stadium is built in what was originally a natural ravine between the two hills of Agra and Ardittos, south of the Ilissos river. It is now located in the central Athens district of Pangrati, to the east of the National Gardens and the Zappeion Exhibition Hall, to the west of the Pangrati residential district, and between the twin pine-covered hills of Ardettos and Agra. Until the 1950s, the Ilissos River, which is now covered by (and flowing underneath) Vasileos Konstantinou Avenue, ran in front of the stadium's entrance, with the spring of Kallirrhoe, the sanctuary of Pankrates (a local hero), and the Cynosarges public gymnasium nearby.

== History ==
Originally, since the 6th century BC, a racecourse stood at the site. It hosted the Panathenaic Games (also known as the Great Panathenaea), a religious and athletic festival celebrated every four years in honour of the goddess Athena. The racecourse had no formal seating and the spectators sat on the natural slopes on the side of the ravine.

=== Stadium of Lykourgos ===
In the 4th century BC the Athenian statesman Lykourgos (Lycurgus) built an 850-foot (260 m) long stadium of poros stone. Tiers of stone benches were arranged around the track. The track was 669 feet (204 m) long and 110 feet (34 m) wide. In the Lives of the Ten Orators Pseudo-Plutarch writes that a certain Deinas, the owner of the property where the stadium was built was persuaded by Lykourgos to donate the land to the city and Lykourgos leveled a ravine. IG II² 351 (dated 329 BC), records that Eudemus of Plataea gave 1000 yoke of oxen for the construction of the stadium and theater. According to Romano the "reference to the large number of oxen, indicating a vast undertaking, and the use of the word charadra have suggested the kind of building activity that would have been needed to prepare the natural valley between the two hills near the Ilissos." The stadium of Lykourgos is believed to have been completed for the Panathenaic Games of 330/329 BC. Donald Kyle suggests that it is possible that Lykourgos did not build but "renovated or embellished a pre-existing facility to give it monumental stature." According to Richard Ernest Wycherley the stadium probably had stone seating "only for a privileged few."

=== Reconstruction by Herodes Atticus ===
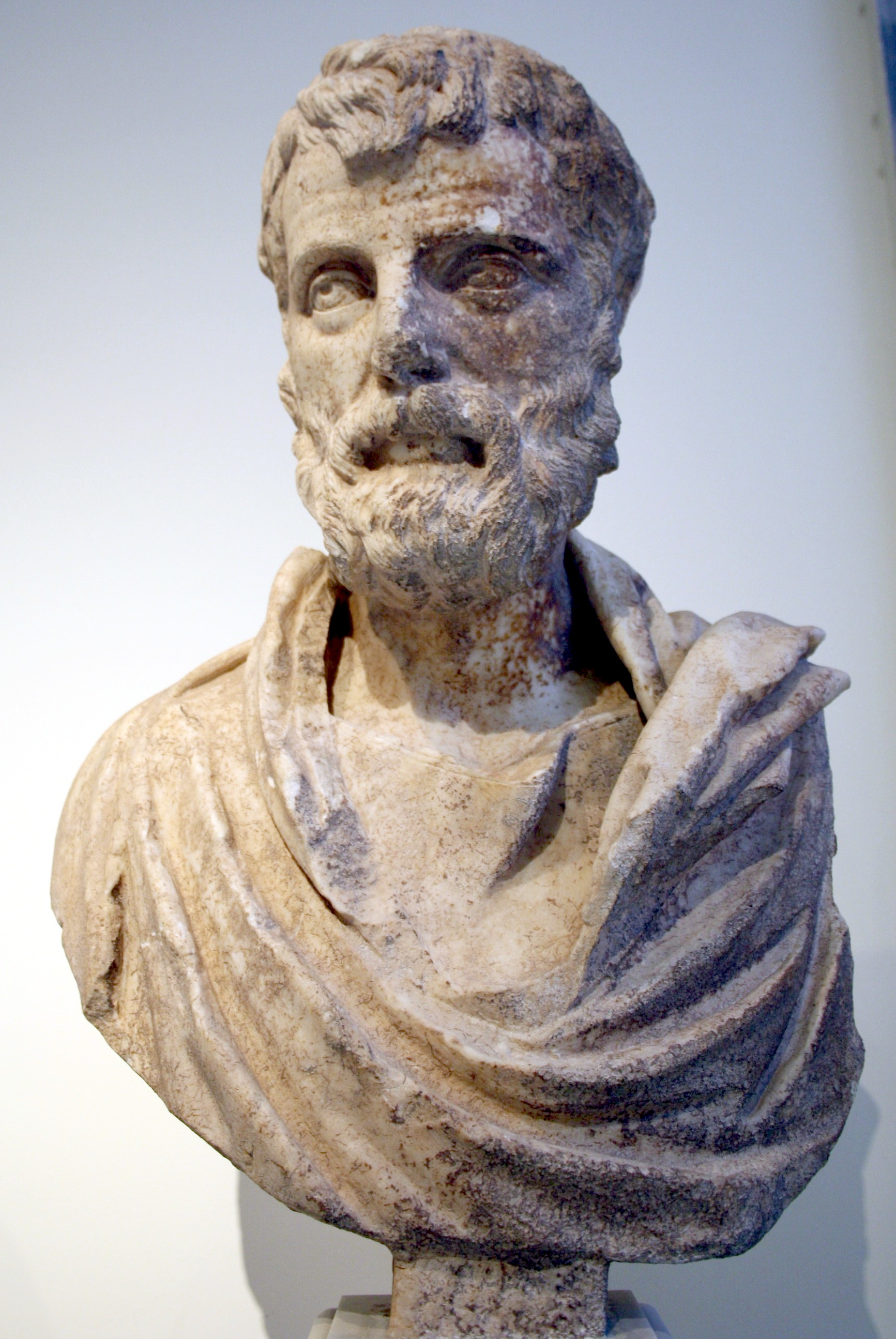
Herodes Atticus rebuilt the stadium in marble by 144 AD.

Herodes Atticus, an Athenian who rose to the highest echelons of power in Rome, was responsible for numerous structures in Greece. In Athens he is best known for the reconstruction of the Panathenaic Stadium. (Note: The dominant view is that Herodes Atticus built the stadium on the site of the Lykourgan stadium. However, Romano suggested a long terrace at the Pnyx hill was the location of the Lykourgan stadium because when Ernst Ziller excavated the site of the Panathenaic Stadium he "found no trace of an earlier stadium." Miller et al. criticize Romano's proposed location: "There is certainly no indication in Ziller's account that he was even concerned with looking for traces of anything earlier that the Stadium of Herodus Atticus.") Tobin suggests that "Herodes built the stadium soon after [his father] Atticus's death, which occurred around A.D. 138. The first Greater Panathenaia following his father's demise was 139/40, and it is probable that at that time Herodes promised the refurbishment of the stadium. According to Philostratus, it was completed four years later, which would have been in 143/4." These dates (139/140-143/144 AD) are now widely cited as construction dates of the stadium of Herodes Atticus. Welch writes that the stadium was completed by 143, in time for Panathenaic festival.

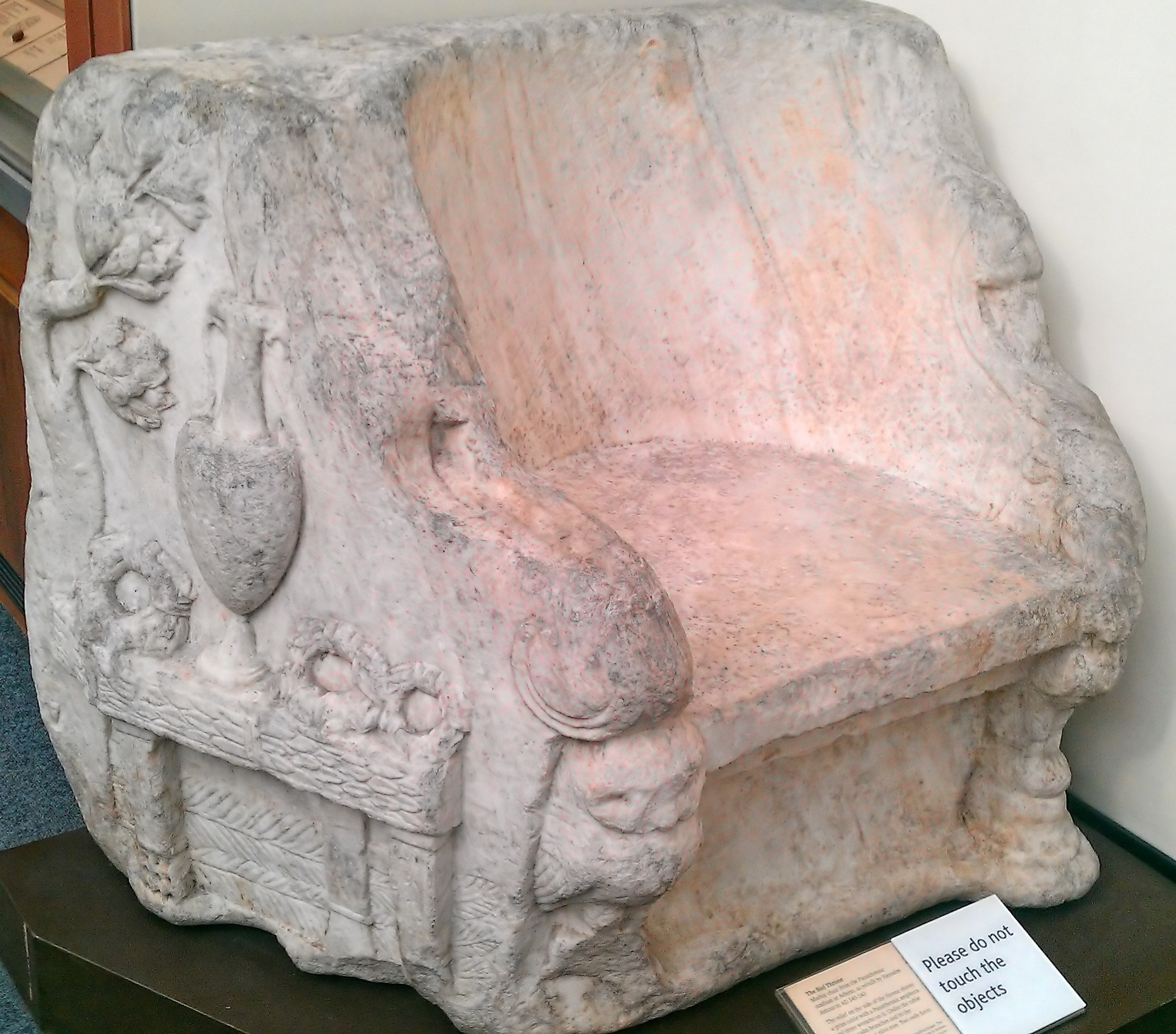
The "Biel Throne", a marble chair from the stadium in the British Museum

The new stadium was built completely of ashlar masonry in Pentelic marble, using minimal concrete. The stadium was built at a time of resurgence of Greek culture in the mid-2nd century. Although the stadium was a "quintessentially Greek architectural type", it was "Roman in scale" with a massive capacity of 50,000, which is roughly the same as that of the Stadium of Domitian in Rome. Stadia of the Classical and Hellenistic periods were smaller. According to Welch there is a possibility that criminals were executed in the stadium, however, no evidence exists.

A marble throne from the prohedria (front row seating) of the stadium is kept in the British Museum. One side of the throne includes a relief showing an olive tree and a table on which rests set of wreaths and a Panathenaic amphora. The front leg is in the form of an owl. Ten similar thrones have been found around Athens.

Herodes Atticus built it as "an architectural means of self-representation, and it did something analogous. The architecture of the building makes allusions to the Classical past while remaining unmistakably modern. It is Roman in scale, but it self-consciously rejects the distinguishingly Roman features of monumental facade and extensive vaulting." The seats of the cavea were decorated with owls in relief, which symbolize Athena. Katherine Welch wrote in a 1998 article "Greek stadia and Roman spectacles":

Though traditional in building materials and construction technique, the track included modern features that were specifically designed to accommodate Roman entertainments. [...] It may thus be argued that the Panathenaic Stadium of Herodes Atticus, who was both Athens' leading son and a Roman consul, represents a middle ground between two conflicting cultural expectations. Its architectural for was self-consciously old-fashioned, yet in scale and function the building was thoroughly modern. Herodes Atticus built a new Panathenaic Stadium whose architecture reflected the prevailing nostalgia for Classical Greece but whose functions reflected the new realities of Roman power. While the building continued to be used chiefly for athletic competitions, its running track was also a place where during the imperial cult festival wild animals were slaughtered and hardened criminals (gladiators) fought, bled, and died.

=== Abandonment ===
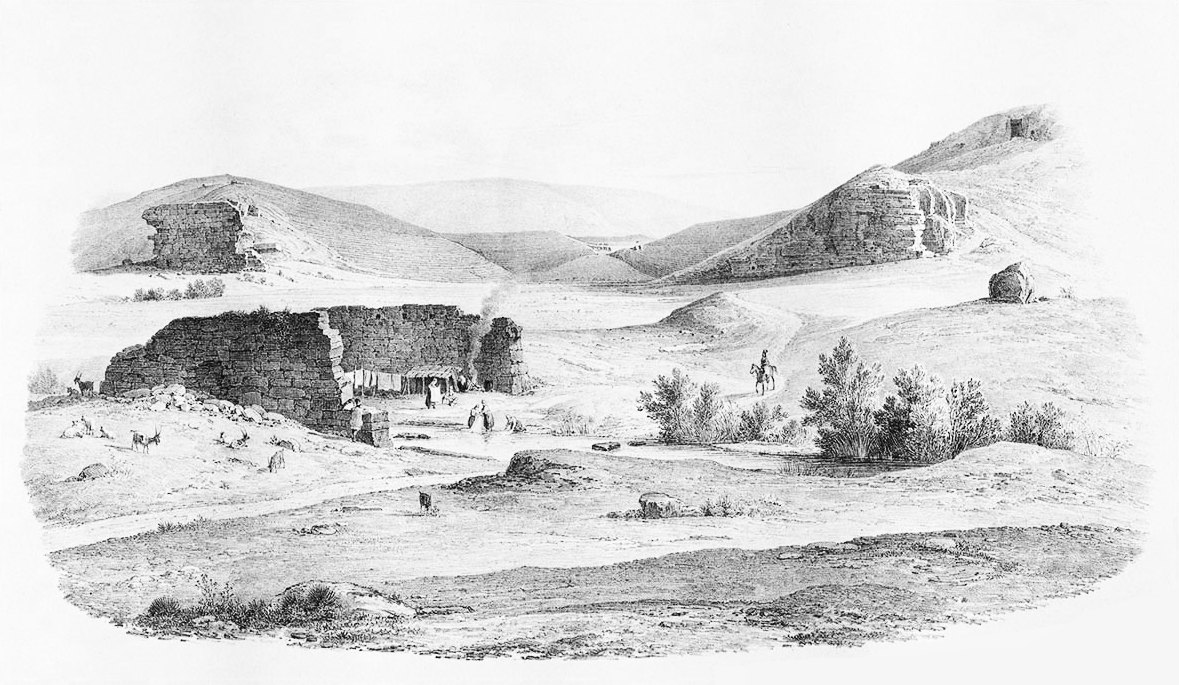
The ruins of the stadium in the background, 1835

After Hellenistic festivals and bloody spectacles were banned by Roman Emperor Theodosius I in the late 4th century, the stadium was abandoned and fell into ruin. Gradually, its significance was forgotten and a field of wheat covered the site. During the Latin rule of Athens, Crusader knights held feats of arms at the stadium. A 15th century traveler saw "not only several rows of white marble benches, but also the portico at the entrance of the stadion, which he calls the north entrance, and the stoa round the koilon, which he calls the south entrance." The derelict stadium's marbles were incorporated into other buildings. European travelers wrote of "magical rites enacted by young Athenian maidens in the ruined vaulted passage, aimed at finding a good husband."

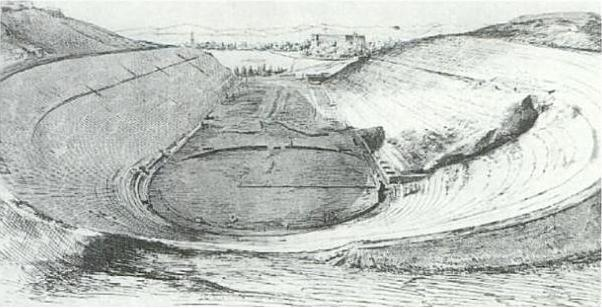
The stadium 1870, following excavations by Ziller

=== Modern reconstruction ===
==== Excavations and Zappas Olympics ====
Following Greece's independence, archaeological excavation as early as 1836 uncovered traces of the stadium of Herodes Atticus. Further, more thorough excavation was conducted by the German-born architect Ernst Ziller in 1869–70. Some marbles of the stadium and four Hermai were found. The Zappas Olympics, an early attempt to revive the ancient Olympic Games, were held at the stadium in 1870 and 1875. They were sponsored by the Greek benefactor Evangelis Zappas. The games had an audience of 30,000 people.

==== 1896 Olympics ====
The Greek government, through crown prince Constantine, requested the Egypt-based Greek businessman George Averoff to sponsor the second refurbishment of the stadium prior to the 1896 Olympics. Based on the findings of Ziller, a reconstruction plan was prepared by the architect Anastasios Metaxas in the mid-1890s. Darling writes that "He duplicated the dimensions and design of the second-century structure, arranging the tiers of seats around the U-shaped track." It was rebuilt in Pentelic marble and is "distinguished by its high degree of fidelity to the ancient monument of Herodes." Averoff donated 920,000 drachmas to this project. As a tribute to his generosity, a statue of Averoff was constructed and unveiled on 5 April 1896 outside the stadium. It stands there to this day.

The stadium held the opening and closing ceremonies of the 1896 Olympics. On 6 April (25 March according to the Julian calendar then in use in Greece), the games of the First Olympiad were officially opened; it was Easter Monday for both the Western and Eastern Christian Churches and the anniversary of Greece's independence. The stadium was filled with an estimated 60,000 spectators, including King George I of Greece, his wife Olga, and their sons. Most of the competing athletes were aligned on the infield, grouped by nation. After a speech by the president of the organizing committee, Crown Prince Constantine, his father officially opened the games. The stadium also served as the venue for Athletics, Gymnastics, Weightlifting and Wrestling.

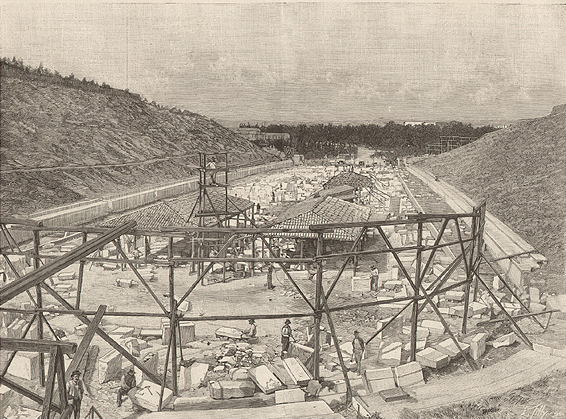
Reconstruction works at the stadium, 1895

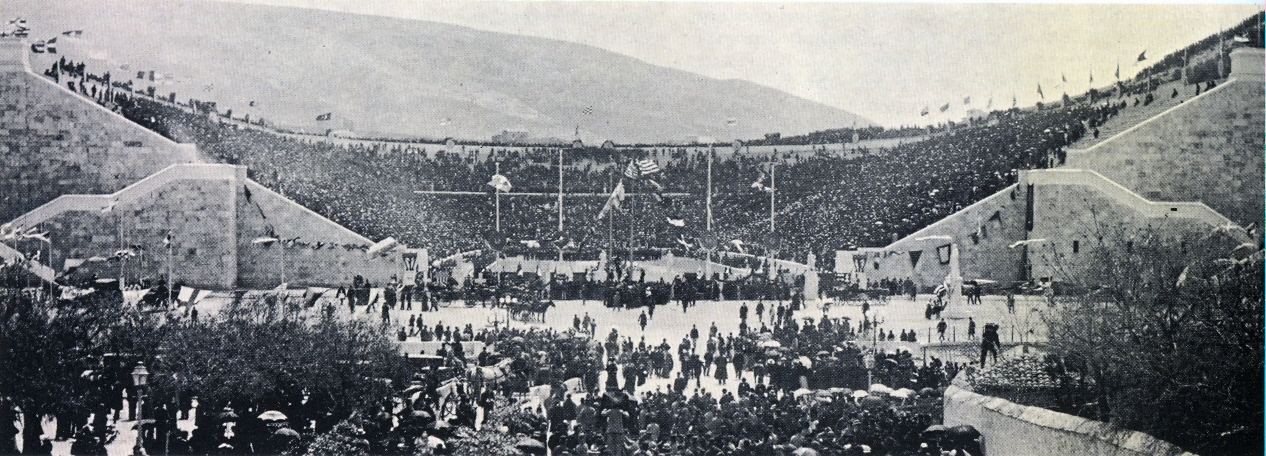
The first day of the 1896 Olympics

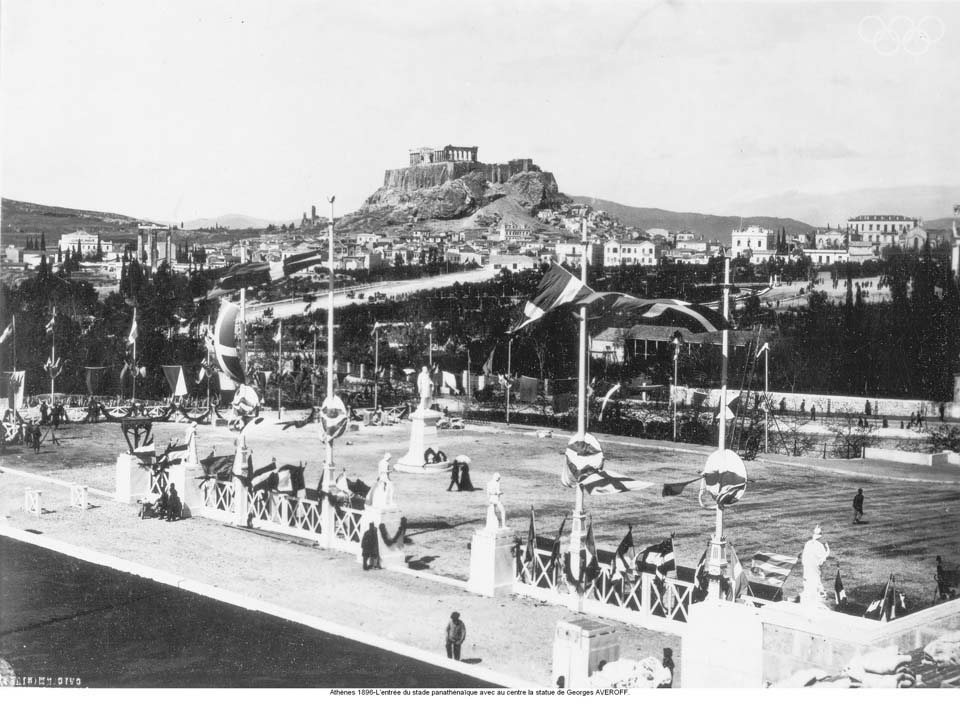
Entrance of participants to the stadium. The Acropolis is seen in the background.

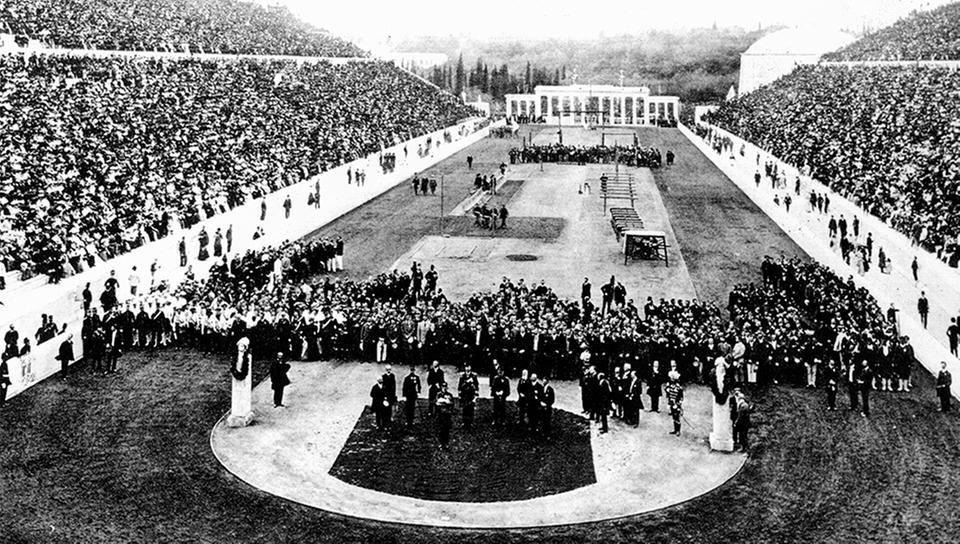
The opening ceremony

==== 1906 Intercalated Games ====
The stadium hosted the 1906 Intercalated Games from 22 April to 2 May.

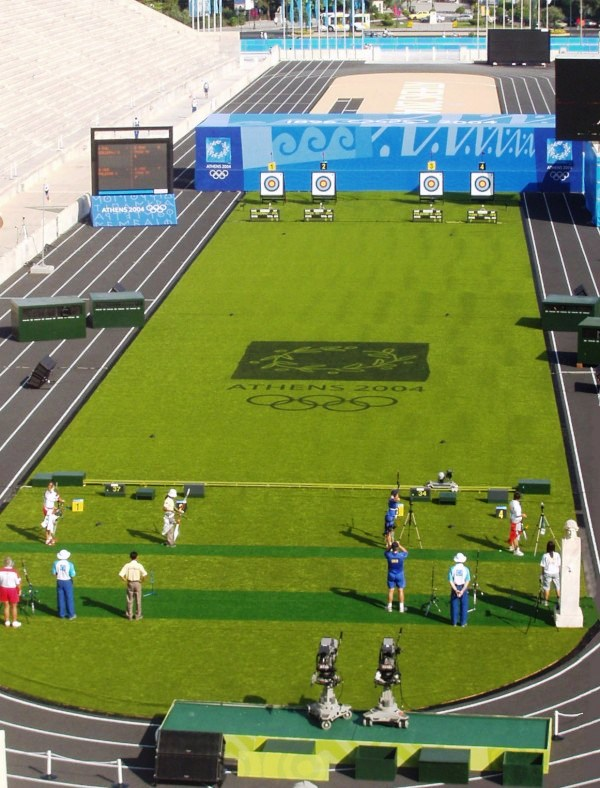
Archery matches in the stadium during the 2004 Olympics

==== Home of AEK Basketball Club ====
From the mid- to late 1960s, the stadium was used by AEK Basketball Club. On 4 April 1968, the 1967–68 FIBA European Cup Winners' Cup final was hosted in the stadium where AEK defeated Slavia VŠ Praha in front of around 70,000 seated spectators inside the arena and another 10,000 standing spectators near the entrance.

==== Regime of the Colonels ====
During the Regime of the Colonels (1967–74), large annual events were held at the stadium, particularly the "Festival of the Military Virtues of the Greeks" (in late August-early September) and the "Revolution of 21 April 1967", the date of the coup that brought the right-wing regime to power. In these festivals, the stadium, "with its aura of antiquity stood as a monument to Greek rebirth, national pride, and international interest." The dictators exploited its setting to showcase their supposed popularity and propagate their new, "revolutionary" political culture.

==== 2004 Olympics ====
The stadium "needed no major refurbishing" prior to the 2004 Summer Olympics in Athens. During the games the stadium hosted the archery competition (15–21 August) and was the finish of the Marathon for both women (22 August) and men (29 August).

==== 2011 Special Olympics World Summer Games ====
The opening ceremony of the 2011 Special Olympics World Summer Games were held here which featured special appearances such as Stevie Wonder, Vanessa Williams and Zhang Ziyi. The games ran from 25 June to 5 July.

==== 2026 Restoration ====
In August 2026, the Panathenaic Stadium received its first major cleaning in over a century. The marble was carefully cleaned of dirt, weeds, stains, and chewing gum, alongside upgrades to the track and lighting. The restoration was carried out ahead of the stadium's continued role in Olympic ceremonies, including the Olympic flame ceremony for the 2028 Summer Olympics in Los Angeles.

== Concert venue ==
On occasion, the stadium has also been used as a venue for selected musical and dance performances.

- In April 1916 Giuseppe Verdi's Aida was staged at the stadium.
- On 23–24 July 1985 the "Rock in Athens" Festival took place featuring singers and bands like Depeche Mode, The Stranglers, Culture Club, the Cure, Talk Talk, Nina Hagen, and the Clash.
- On 2 October 1988 the "Live AID – Concert for AIDS" was held in the stadium including artists like Bonnie Tyler, Joan Jett, Jerry Lee Lewis, Run–D.M.C. and Black Uhuru.
- On 5 October 2008, the stadium hosted the MTV Greece launch party, with guests R.E.M., Kaiser Chiefs, C：Real and Gabriella Cilmi.
- On 1 July 2009, Sakis Rouvas performed a sold-out concert in support of environmental issues before an audience of 50,000. it was the largest attendance ever at the stadium for a non-sporting event, and the largest attendance for a single musical artist in Greek history, until Anna Vissi broke the record in 2024.
- On 16 July 2018, the Scorpions gave the "Once in a Lifetime" concert at the stadium.
- On 5 October 2024, Anna Vissi broke every previous record with a concert attended by 65,000 fans.
- On 13th and 14th of September 2025, Anna Vissi performed 2 sold out concerts attended by 130,000 fans.
- On 2 October 2025, Robbie Williams performed at the stadium as part of his Britpop Tour.

Other concerts include those of Spanish tenor Plácido Domingo (27 June 2007) and a dance performance by Joaquín Cortés (14 September 2009).

== Other events ==
The stadium hosted the opening ceremony of the 1997 World Championships in Athletics on a concept by composer Vangelis and along with the performance of soprano Montserrat Caballé.

In more recent years, the stadium has been often used to honour the homecoming of victorious Greek athletes, most notably the Greece national football team after its victory at the UEFA Euro 2004 on 5 July 2004 as well as Greek medalists in recent Olympic Games.

The stadium was the venue for the Dior Cruise 2022 show. The collection drew inspiration from Ancient Greek art and Greek folk culture as well as Christian Dior's Fall 1951 campaign photoshoot on the Acropolis. The show was attended by many A-listers, such as Anya Taylor-Joy, Cara Delevingne, Jisoo and many other global and Greek stars.

== Architecture ==
Katherine Welch described the stadium as a "great marble flight of steps terraced into the contours of a U-shaped ravine — splendid in materials but ostentatiously simple in construction technique."

=== Influence ===
The Panathenaic Stadium influenced the stadium architecture in the West in the 20th century. Harvard Stadium in Boston, built in 1903, was modeled after the Panathenaic Stadium. Designated as a National Historic Landmark, it is the first collegiate athletic stadium in the United States. Deutsches Stadion in Nuremberg, designed by Albert Speer, was also modeled on the Panathenaic Stadium. Speer was inspired by the stadium when he visited Athens in 1935. He designed a stadium for some 400,000 spectators, which was one of the monumental structures of the Nazi regime. Its construction began in 1937, but was never completed.

== Commemorations ==
The Panathenaic Stadium was selected as the main motif for a high value euro collectors' coin; the €100 Greek The Panathenaic Stadium commemorative coin, minted in 2003 to commemorate the 2004 Olympics. In the obverse of the coin, the stadium is depicted. It is shown on the obverse of all Olympic medals awarded in the 2004 Olympics, and it was also used for the succeeding Summer Olympics in Beijing in 2008, in London in 2012, in Rio de Janeiro in 2016, and in Tokyo in 2021.

== Gallery ==
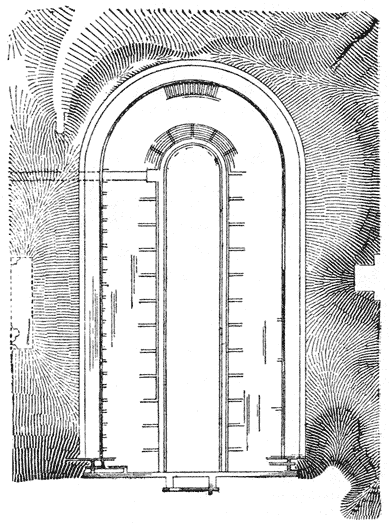
Atlas von Athen, Berlin, 1878

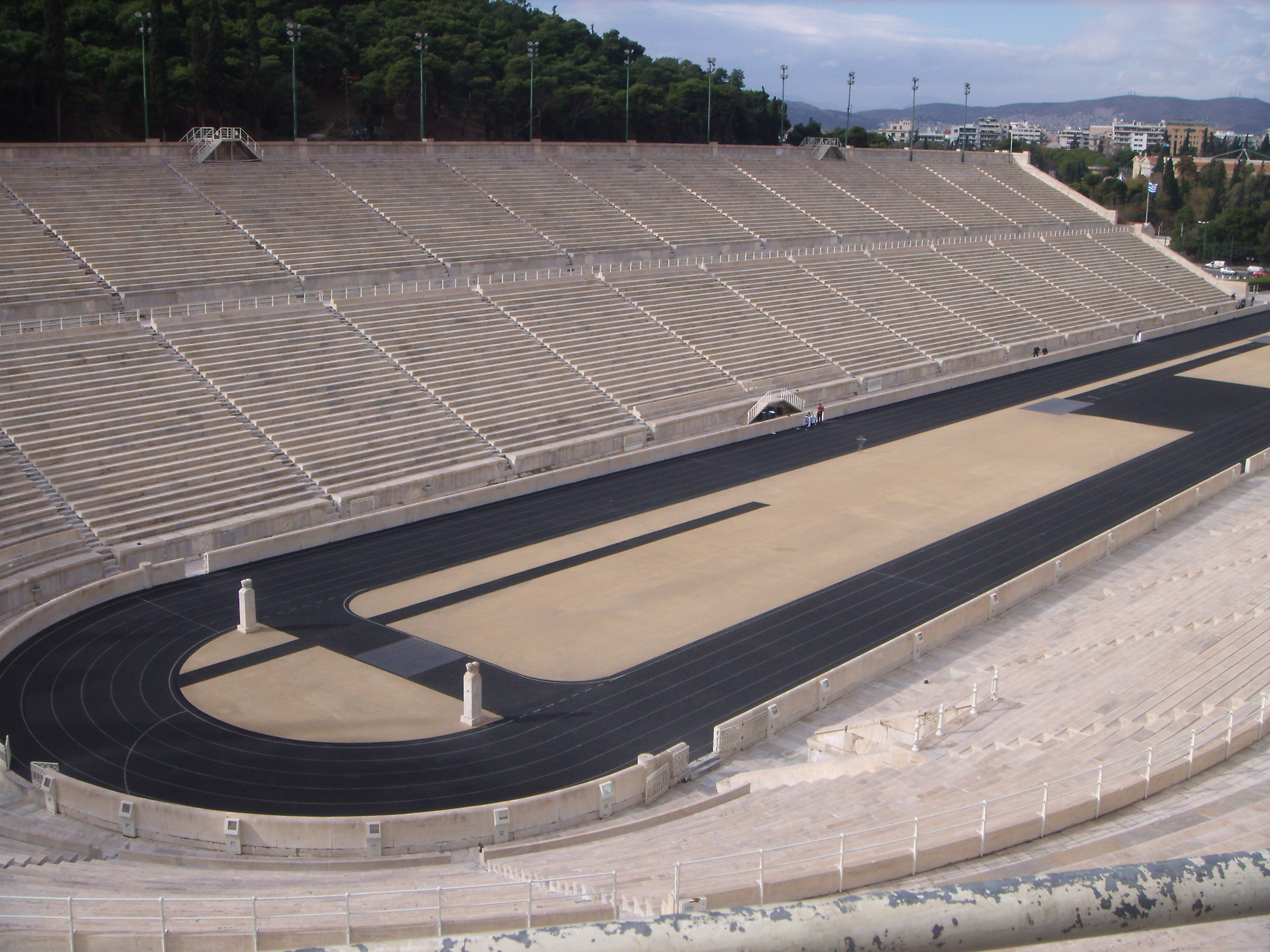

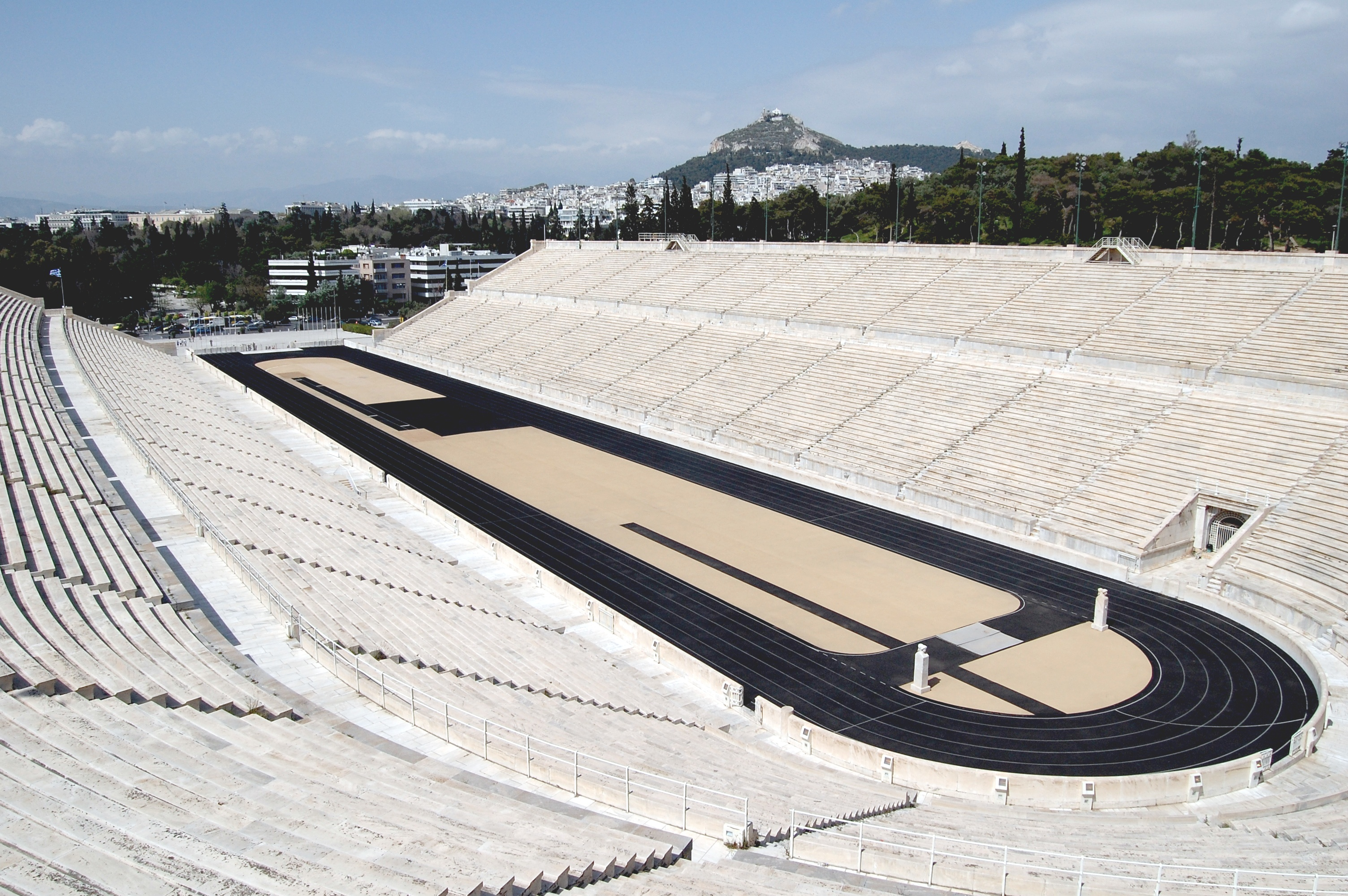

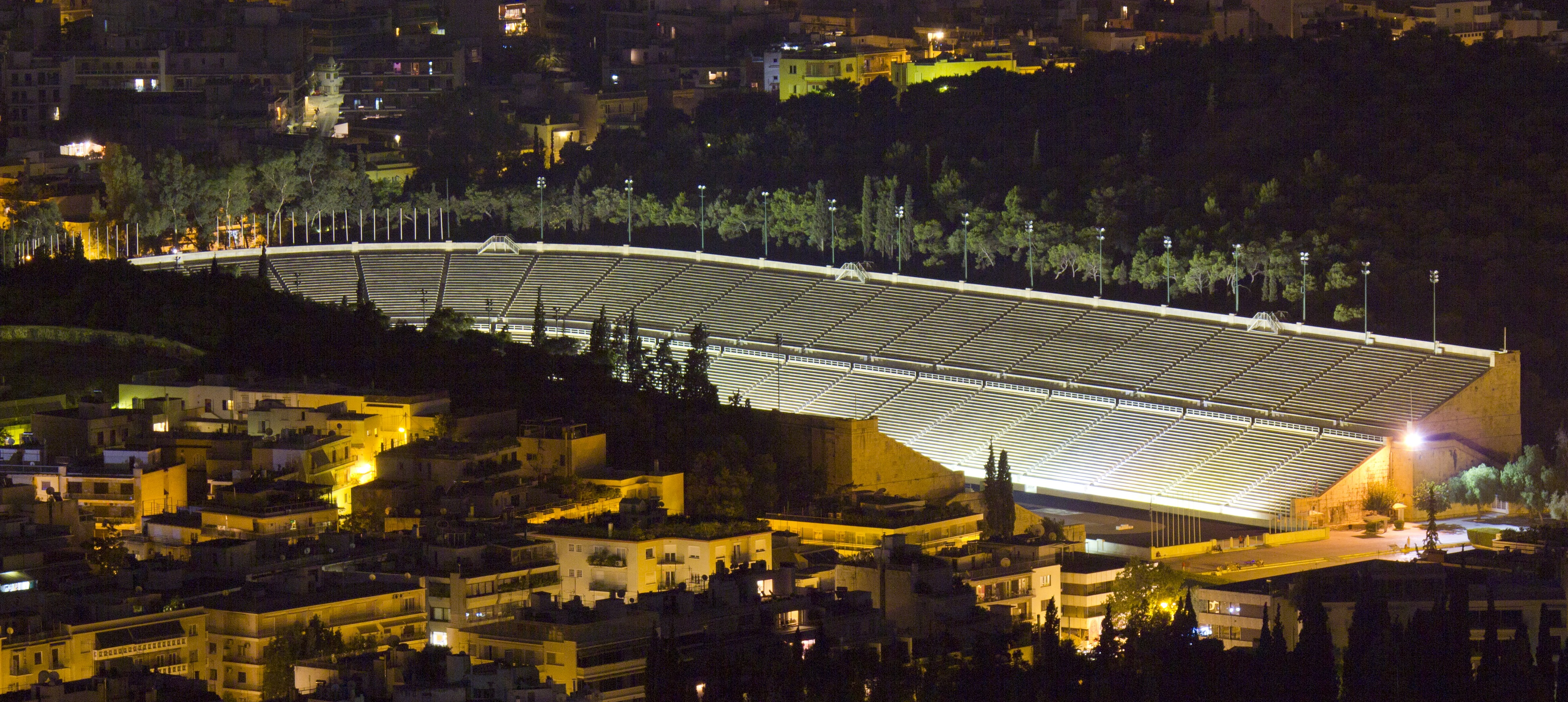
View from Mt. Lycabettus at night

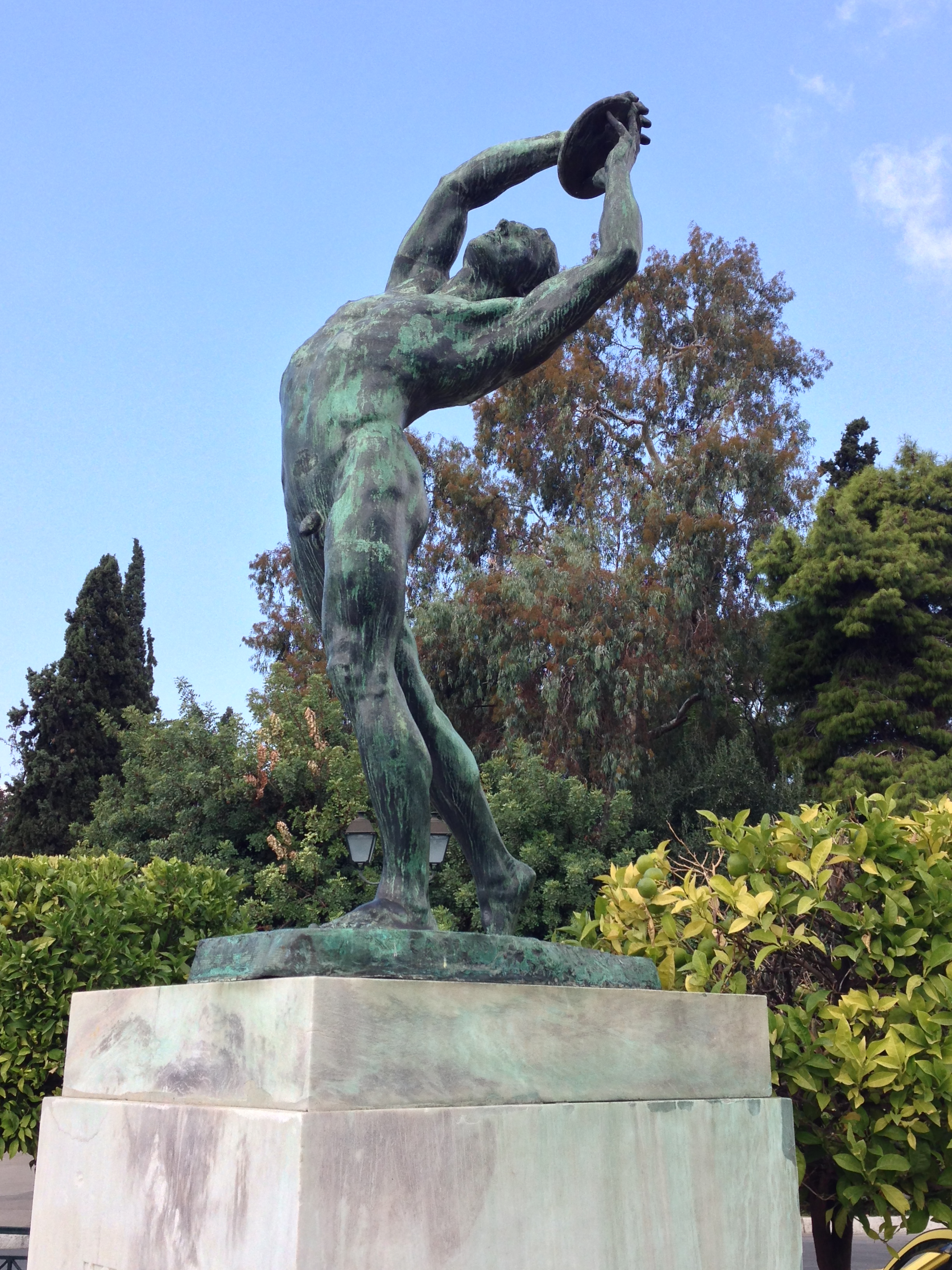
Discobolus statue outside the stadium by Konstantinos Dimitriadis

Panorama of the Panathenaic stadium from the entrance

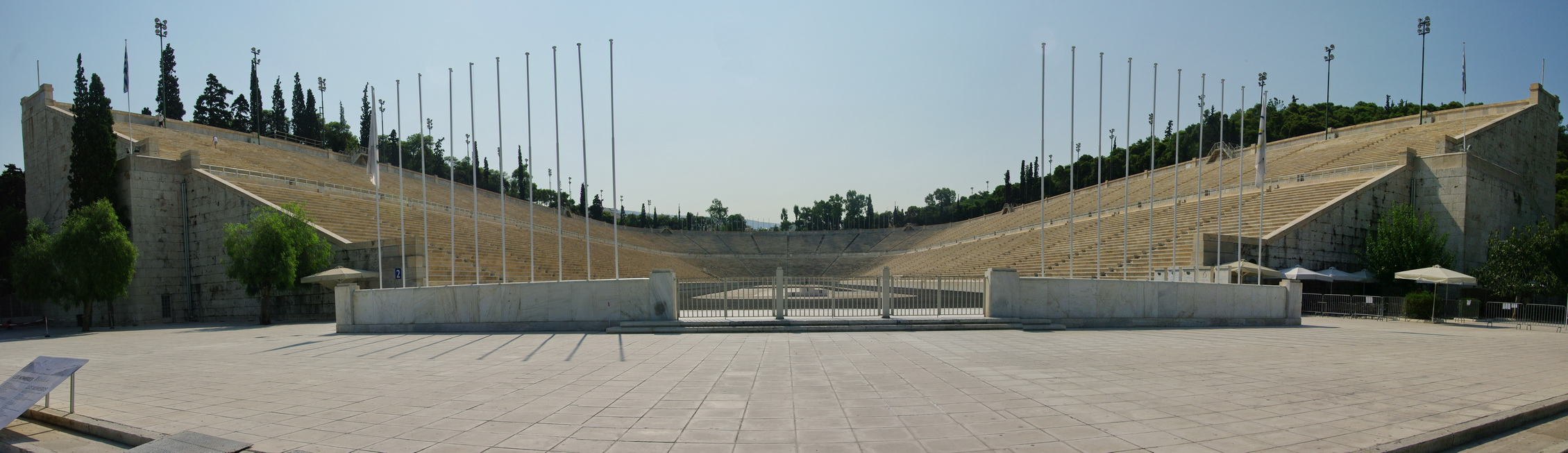

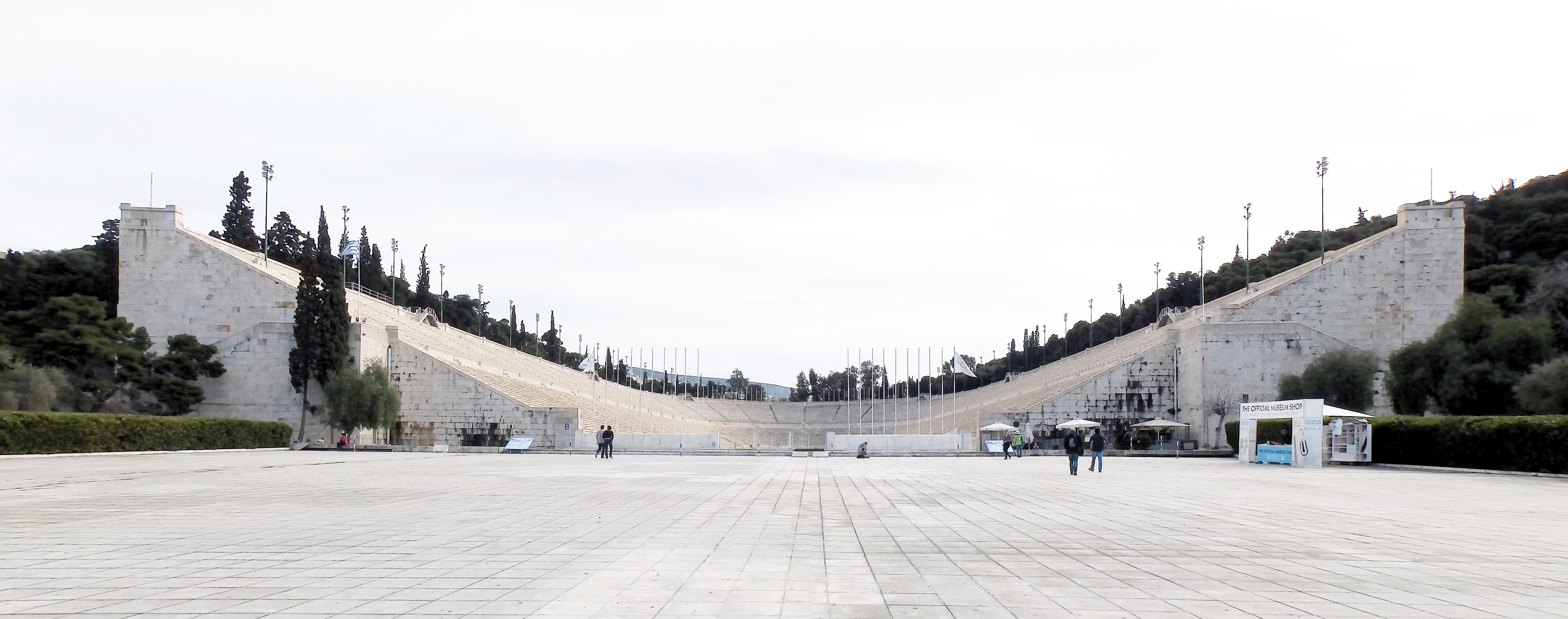

== See also ==
- Hippodrome of Constantinople

== Bibliography ==
Excavation reports

- Ziller, Ernst (1870). "Ausgrabung am panathenaischen Stadion". Zeitschrift für Bauwesen (in German). 20: 485–492.
- Lampros, Spyridon P. (1870). Το Παναθηναϊκόν Στάδιον και αι εν αυτώ ανασκαφαί : Εκθέσεις αναγνωσθείσαι εν τω Φιλολογικώ Συλλόγω ο Παρνασσός. Athens: Ν. Γ. Πάσσαρη.
- Ampelas, Alex (1906). Ολίγαι λέξεις περί σταδίων και δη του Παναθηναϊκού. Athens: Estia.
- Gasparri, Carlo (1975). "Lo stadio panatenaico. Documenti e testimonianze per una riconsiderazione dell'edificio di Erode Attico". ASAtene (in Italian). 36–37: 313–392.

Discussions

- Cecconi, Niccolò (2020). "Lo Stadio Panatenaico". Annuario della Scuola Archeologica di Atene e delle Missioni Italiane in Oriente. 98: 417–455.
- Darling, Janina K. (2004). "Panathenaic Stadium, Athens". Architecture of Greece. Greenwood Publishing Group. pp. 133–135. ISBN 9780313321528.
- Kalligas, P. G. (2009). "Το Παναθηναϊκό Στάδιο: Μία Νέα Ερμηνεία". Αρχαιολογία Και Τέχνες. 113: 86–94.
- Mylonas, P. M. (1997). "Στοιχεία από την παλαιότερη και την πρόσφατη ιστορία του Παναθηναϊκού Σταδίου". PAA: 452–496.
- Papanicolaou-Christensen, Aristea (2003). The Panathenaic Stadium: Its history over the centuries. Historical and Ethnological Society of Greece. ISBN 9789608557376. Archived from the original on 2016-08-12.
- Polites, N. G. (1896). "The Panathenaic Stadion". In Lambros, S. P.; Polites, N. G. (eds.). The Olympic Games: B.C. 776 – A.D. 1896 (PDF). London: H. Grevel and Co. pp. 31–48. Archived from the original (PDF) on 2015-11-02.
- Rife, Joseph L. (2008). "The Burial of Herodes Atticus: Élite Identity, Urban Society, and Public Memory in Roman Greece". The Journal of Hellenic Studies. 128: 92–127. doi:10.1017/S0075426900000070. ISSN 0075-4269. JSTOR 40651725.
- Romano, David Gilman (1985). "The Panathenaic Stadium and Theater of Lykourgos: A Re-Examination of the Facilities on the Pnyx Hill". American Journal of Archaeology. 89 (3): 441–454. doi:10.2307/504359. JSTOR 504359. S2CID 191403660.
- Tobin, Jennifer (1993). "Some New Thoughts on Herodes Atticus's Tomb, His Stadium of 143/4, and Philostratus VS 2.550". American Journal of Archaeology. 97 (1): 81–89. doi:10.2307/505840. hdl:11693/48694. JSTOR 505840. S2CID 191509757.
- Welch, Katherine (1998). "Greek stadia and Roman spectacles: Asia, Athens, and the tomb of Herodes Atticus". Journal of Roman Archaeology. 11: 117–145. doi:10.1017/S1047759400017220. S2CID 160360888.
- Williams, Dyfri (2015). "The Panathenaic Stadium from the Hellenistic to the Roman Period: Panathenaic Prize-Amphorae and the Biel Throne". In Palagia, Olga; Spetsieri-Choremi, Alkestis (eds.). The Panathenaic Games: Proceedings of an International Conference Held at the University of Athens, May 11-12, 2004. Oxbow Books. pp. 147–158. ISBN 978-1-78297-982-1.
- Young, David C. (1996). The Modern Olympics: A Struggle for Revival. Johns Hopkins University Press. ISBN 0-8018-7207-3.
