= Ardittos Hill =

Hill in Athens, Greece

Ardittos Αρδητός
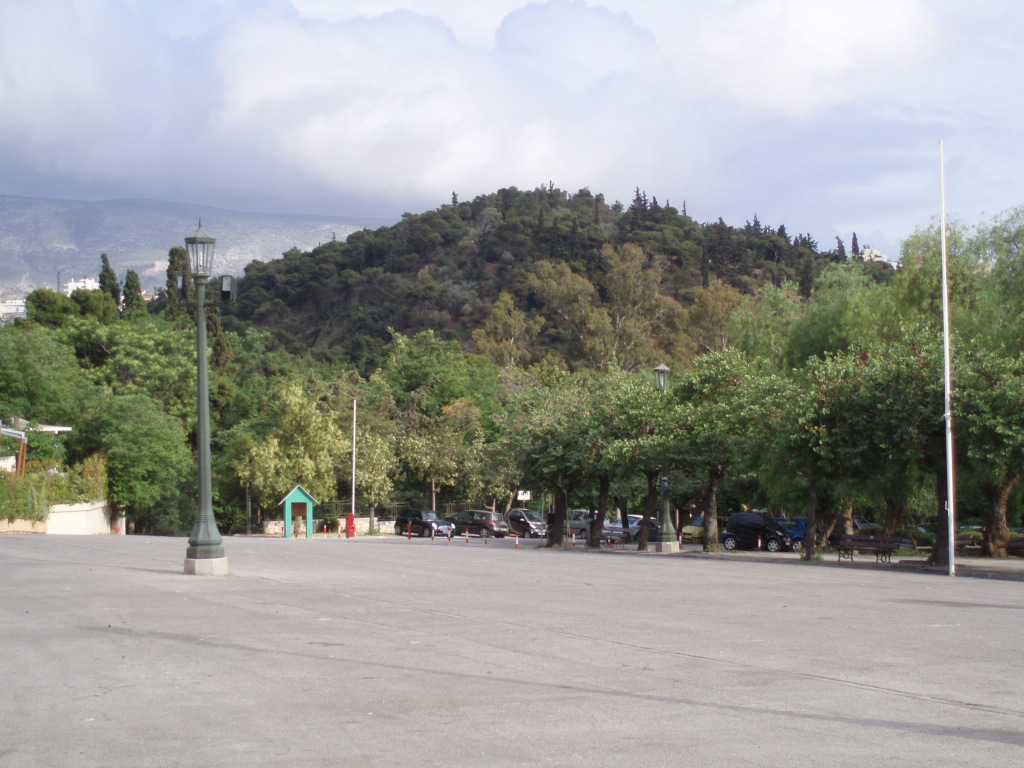
- Ardittos hill
- Interactive map of Ardittos
- Coordinates: 37.968723200764494°N 23.738853381537705°E
- Country: Greece
- Region: Attica
- City: Athens
- Website: Ardittos Park

Ardittos Hill or Ardettus Hill (Greek: Αρδηττός or Greek: λόφος Αρδηττoύ) is located east of the Ilissos river, overlooking the Panathenaic Stadium in Athens, Greece. It has a height of 133 meters, covered with pines and Mediterranean vegetation. It serves as a public park.

== History ==
In antiquity, this hill was notable for its temples, second only to the Acropolis in prominence.

The name "Ardittos" comes from the mythical hero Ardittis, who, according to legend, reconciled the pro-democracy and pro-oligarchy factions in Athens through persuasion and a solemn oath. Ardittos Hill was the where citizens in Ancient Athens over the age of 30 could swear the Heliastic oath needed to serve as dikastes (jurors) in the dikasterion court. The oath was inspired by the hero Ardittis, committed them to vote according to the laws.

After its re-construction of Panathenaic Stadium by Herodes Atticus in 144 AD, he erected a small temple dedicated to the goddess Tyche, whose foundations are still visible.

== Gallery ==
Views of and from Ardittos Hill
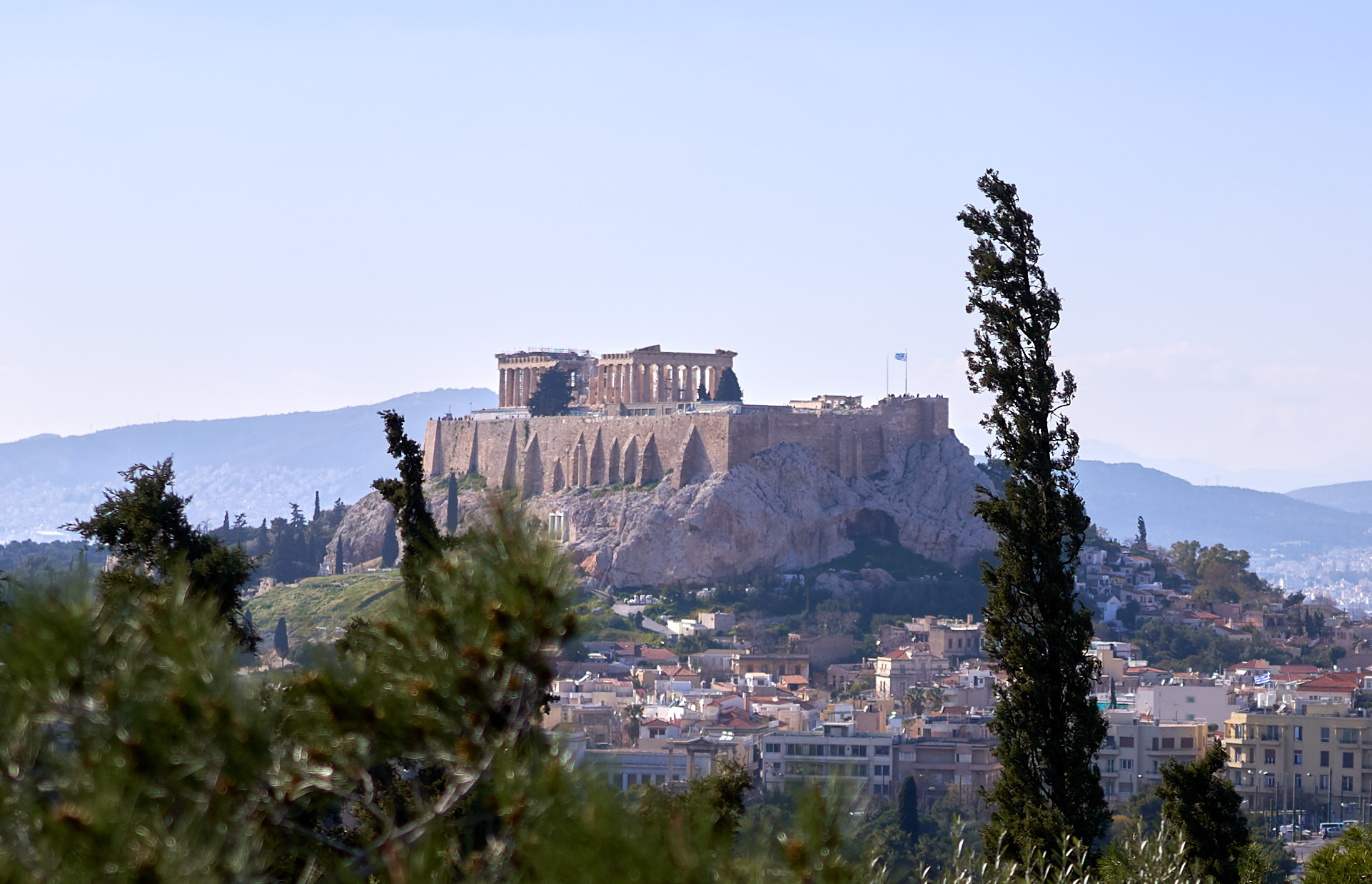
The view of Acropolis from Ardittos Hill

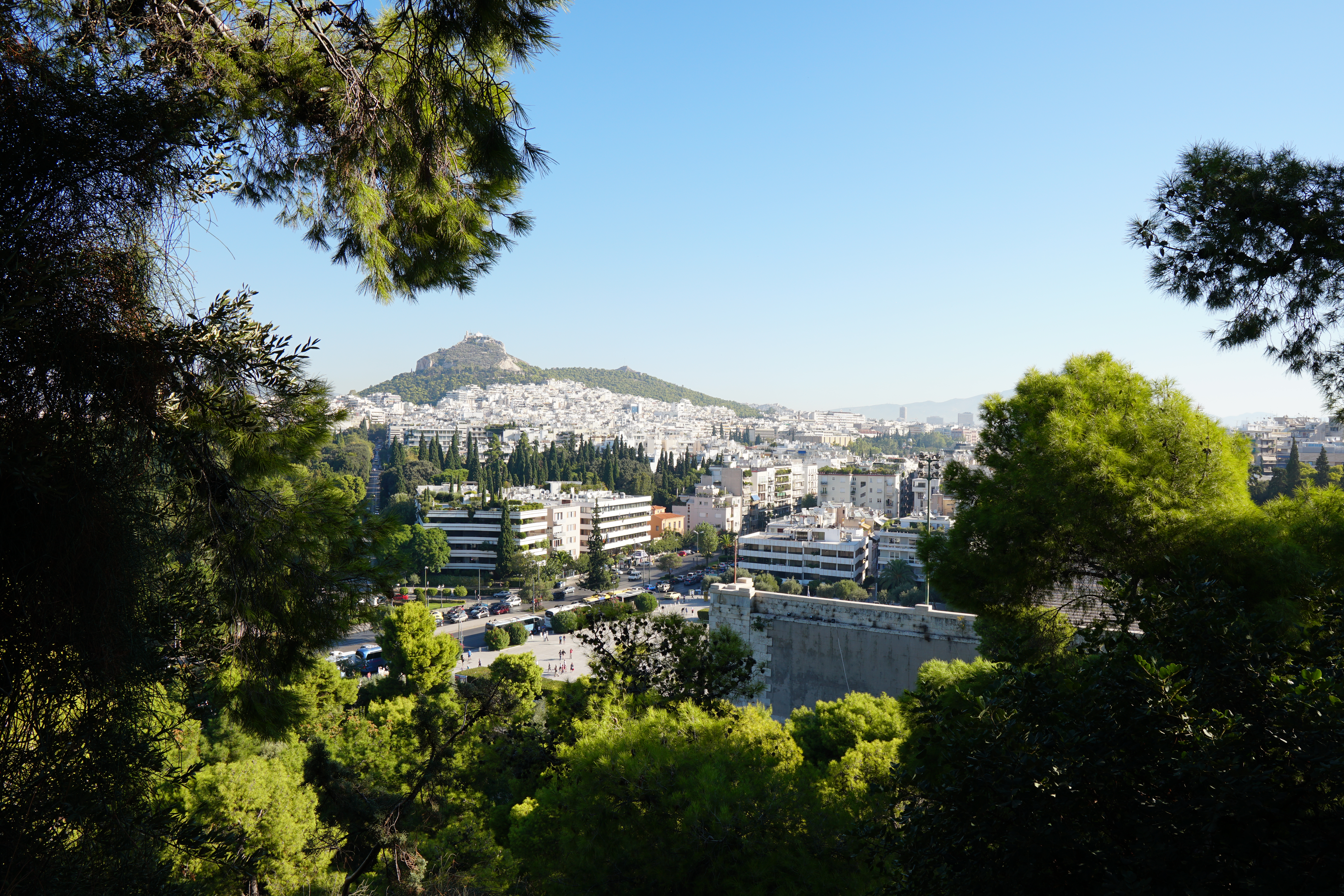
Side view of the entrance to the Panathenaic Stadium from Ardittos Hill. In the distance Mount Lycabettus.

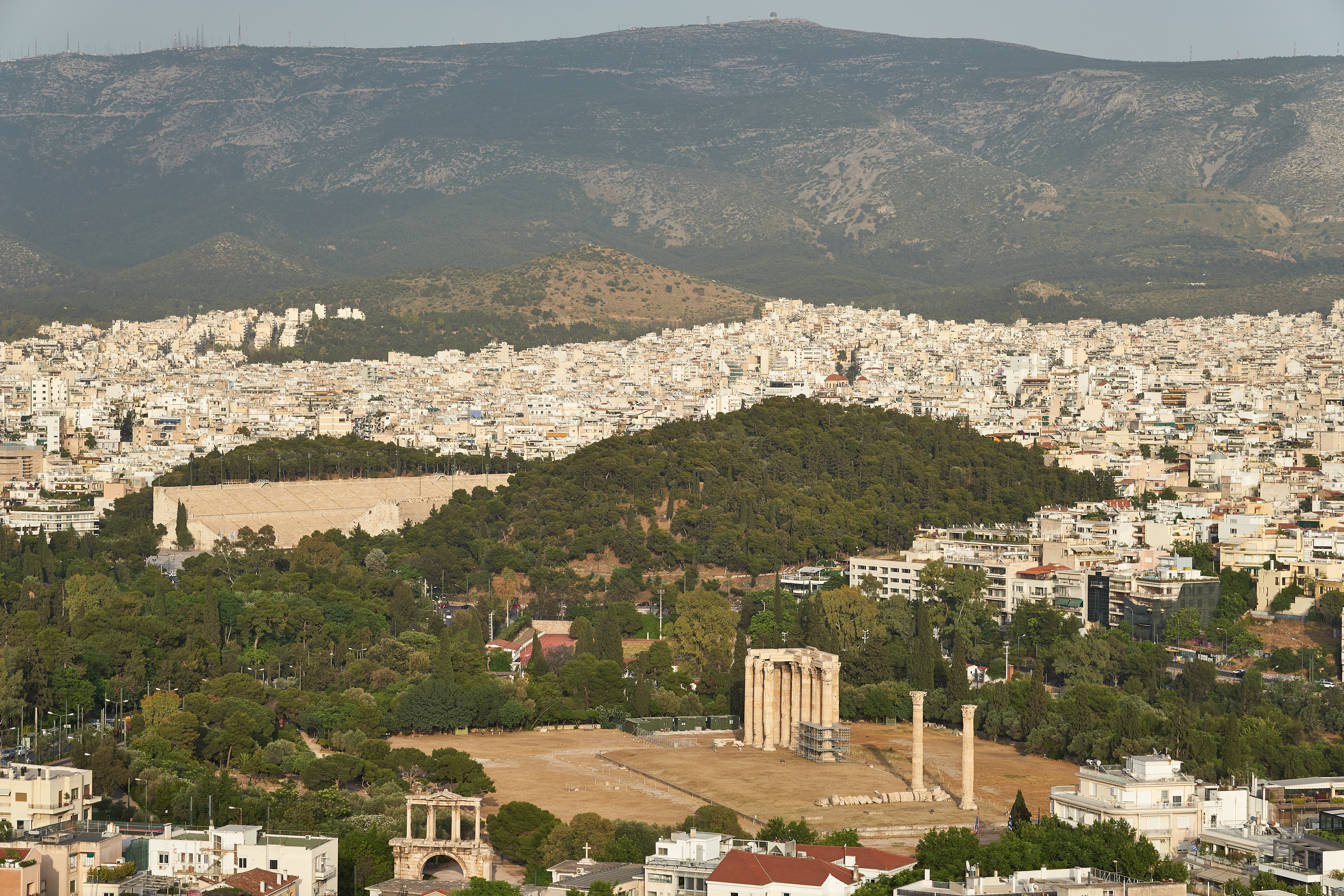
The Temple of Zeus, Ardettus Hill and Mount Hymettus from the Acropolis

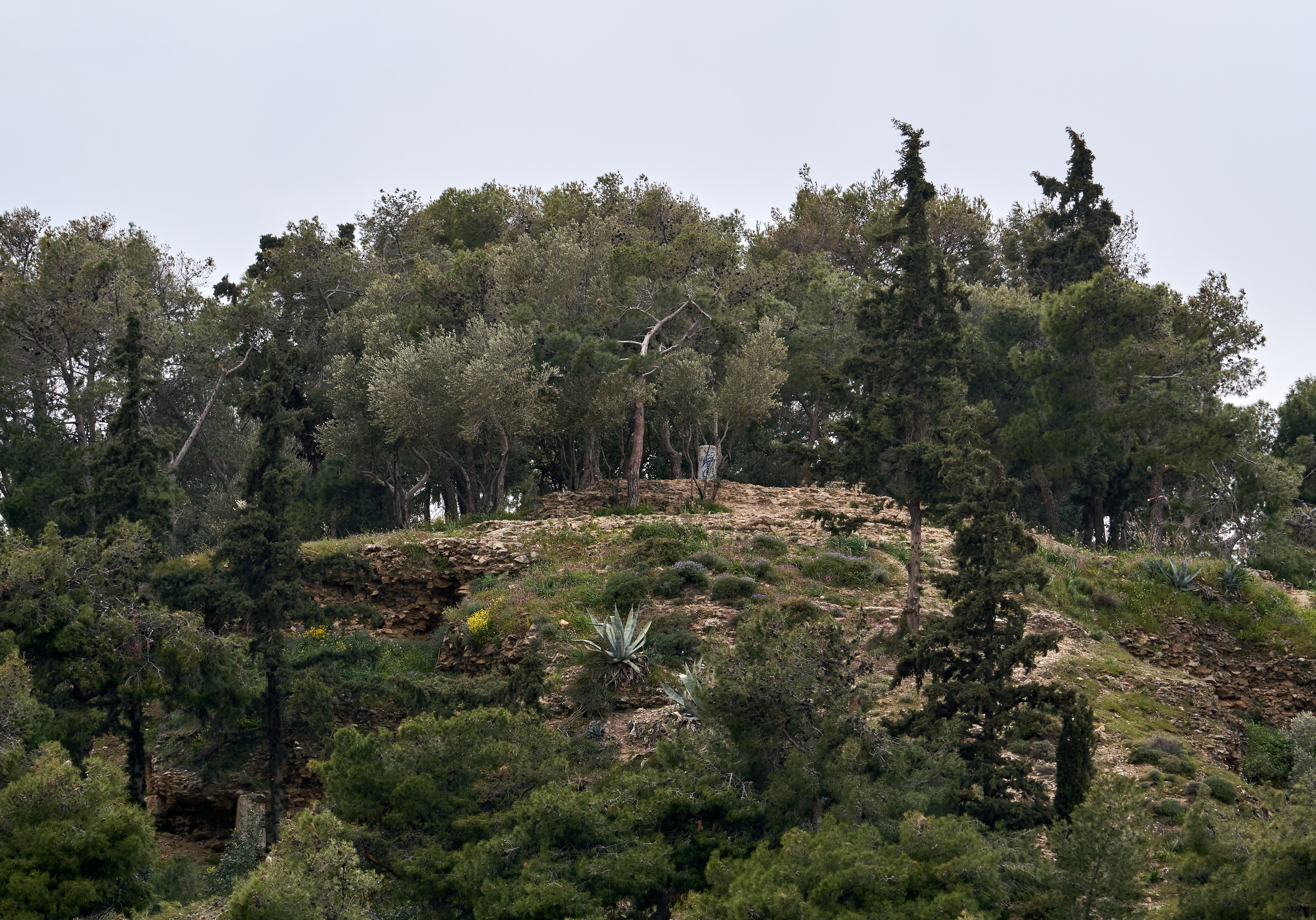
Remains of the Temple of Tyche

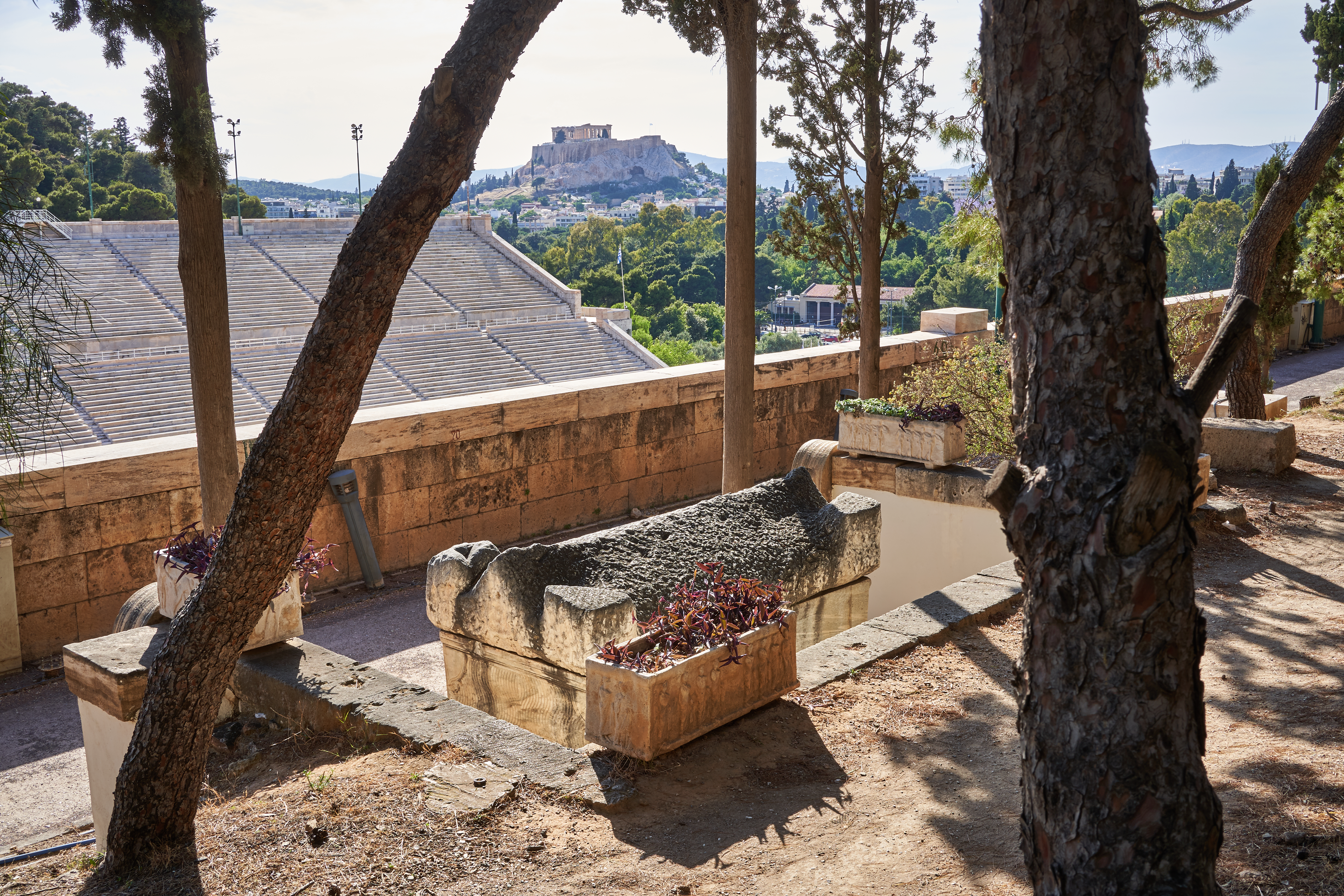
A Roman sarcophagus on Ardittos Hill

== Sources ==
- Cathryn Drake (19 October 2021). "Αρδηττός: Ο λόφος-πάρκο, μνημείο φύσης και ιστορίας". Kathimerini (in Greek). Translated by Μυρτώ Κατσίγερα.
- Irene Anastasiadis (13 June 2024). "Ardittos Hill: In the city but not part of the city". Kathimerini.
- O'Connell, Peter (2013). "Hyperides and Epopteia: A new fragment of the Defense of Phryne". Greek, Roman, and Byzantine Studies. 53 (1): 90–116.
- Harris, Edward M. (2007). "The rule of law in Athenian democracy. Reflections on the judicial oath" (PDF). Etica & Politica / Ethics & Politics. IX: 55–74.
