= Ilisos =

River in Athens, Greece

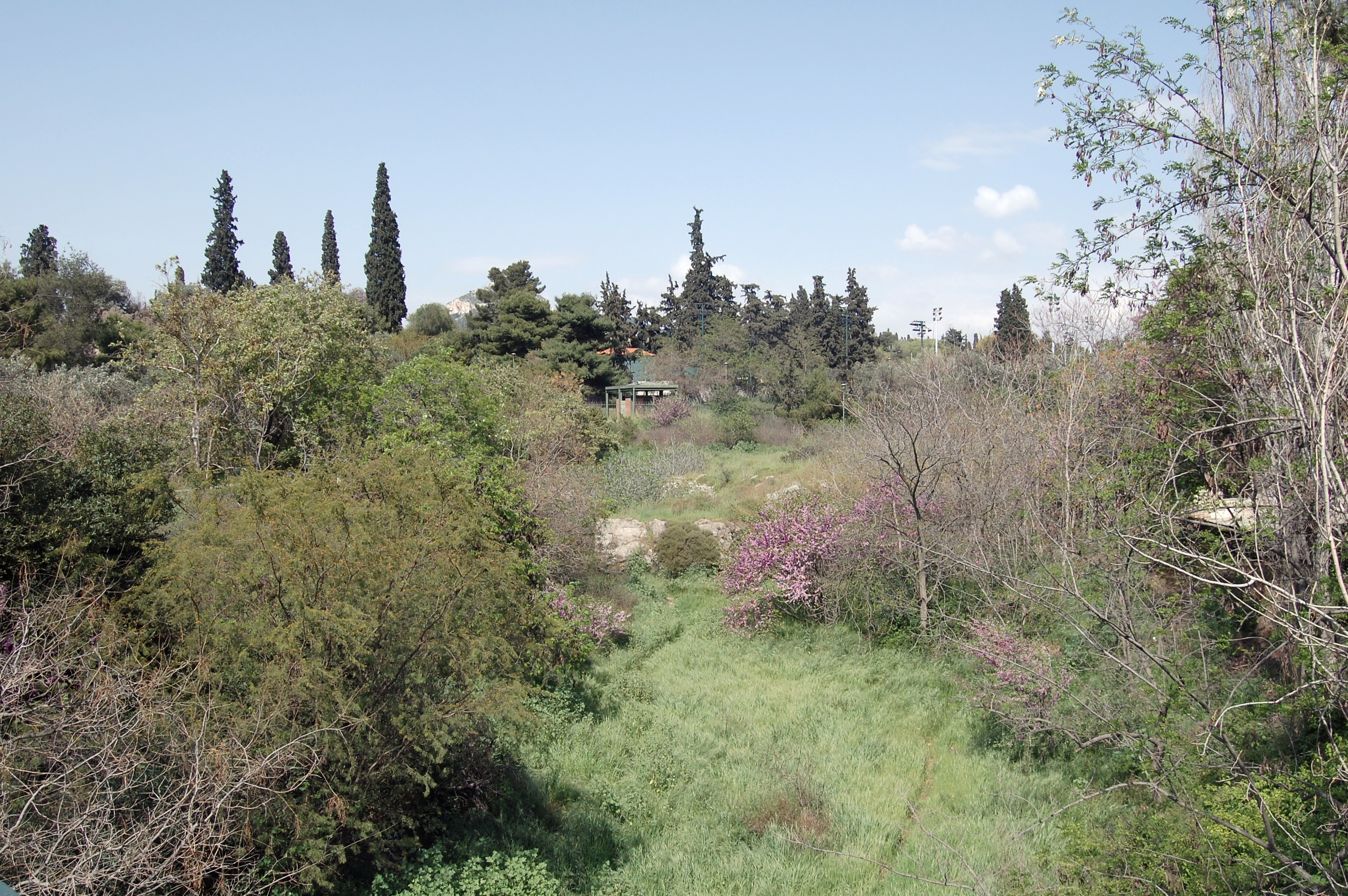
- The only uncanalised part in central Athens proper of the Ilisos river bed
- Native name: Ιλισός (Greek)

Location
- Country: Greece
- Region: Attica
- City: Athens

Physical characteristics
- Source
  - location: Mount Hymettus
- Mouth
  - location: Phaleron Bay
  - coordinates: 37.9397°N 23.6808°E
  - elevation: 0 m (0 ft)

The Ilisos or Ilisus (Ancient Greek: Ἰλισός, Ἰλισσός, Εἰλισσός, Greek: Ιλισός, [iliˈsos]) is a river in Athens, Greece. Originally a tributary of the Kifisos, it has been rechanneled to the sea. It is now largely channeled underground, though as of June 2019 there were plans to unearth the river. Together with the neighbouring river Kifisos, it drains a catchment area of 420 km^{2} (160 sq mi).

== Etymology ==
Its name is in all probability Pre-Greek: it features the ending -sós/-ssós/-ttós, which it shares with many other toponyms in Attica and other rivers in Greece, all of which are considered linguistic substratum survivals.

== Ancient Athens ==
During antiquity, the river flowed outside the city walls of Athens: Plato wrote in Critias that the river was one of the borders of the ancient walls. Its banks—in the busy intersection that presently features the Hilton Hotel and the National Gallery—were grassy and shaded by plane trees, and were considered idyllic in antiquity; they were the favored haunts of Socrates for his walks and teaching. The temple of Pankrátēs, a local hero, was located there, giving its name to the modern suburb of Pagkrati. Ilisos was also considered a demi-god, the son of Poseidon and Demetra, and was worshipped in a sanctuary on the Ardittos hill, next to the current Panathinaiko Stadium. This area was named Cynosarges in antiquity and the spring of Kallirrhóē was located there.

== Modern route ==
River Ilisos and Stadion Bridge, ca. 1900

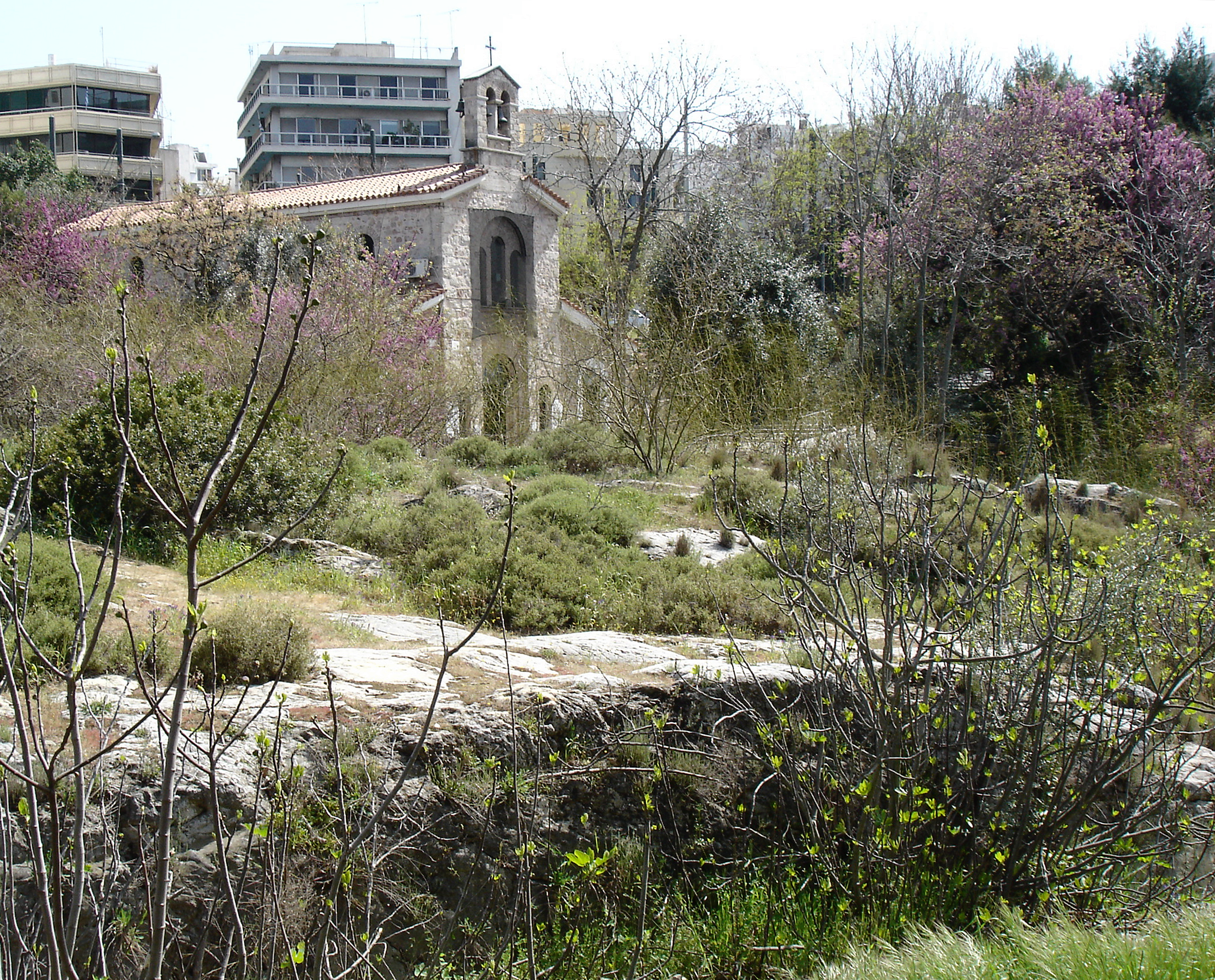
Chapel of Saint Photeine and the River Ilisos

The stream drains the western slopes of Mount Hymettus, and originates from multiple converging seasonal creeks. As urban Athens expanded during the 19th and early 20th centuries, the river became a source of pollution and was converted gradually into a rainwater runoff conduit, covered with streets that track its original, twisting route along the lay of the land. Its bed proper flows under Mesogeion Avenue at the Old Gendarmerie Academy, flows under Michalakopoulou (the modern-day Ilisia suburb) and Vasileos Konstantinou Avenues, and passes in front of the Panathinaiko Stadium, where it was bridged during the 19th century. It then flows to the southeastern flank of the ruined Columns of Olympian Zeus, where it is still visible amidst reed beds, next to the Byzantine chapel of Saint Photeine "of the Ilisos". In older times the river at this point expanded into shallow marshland, termed Βατραχονήσι (Vatrachonísi; lit. "Frog Island") in the vicinity of the ancient spring of Kallirrhóē, now submerged under Avenue Kallirois. As is the case for many Christian churches in Greece, the church of Aghia Foteini, established in 1872, is built on the ruins of an ancient temple, dedicated to Hecate. Archaeological finds of 2014 identified the ruins of yet another temple, of the 4th Century B.C., dedicated to Zeus, "Μειλίχιον Δία", in the vicinity of that of the 5th C. B.C. Ionic temple of Artemis Agrotera, slightly higher up on the same slope of the hill, which is thought to have been called "Agrai". It was here that the goddess was celebrated every year on the anniversary of the Battle of Marathon. The archon in charge would offer goats for sacrifice and the tithe of the sale of war prisoners, while the Athenian youth passed in procession. The importance of this hill was due to the Lesser Mysteries, celebrated every year during the month of Anthesterion (February–March) as a form of initiation of the Great Eleusinian Mysteries. The Hill of Agrai extends as far as the Stadion and is known by the name of Ardettos or Helicon.

Here there is also the Shrine of the God Pan. This rocky outcrop with a small natural cave and two perpendicular faces was found to have a relief of the god Pan. This deity of wild nature was worshiped regularly in caves and rocky terrain. Pan is depicted striding to the right with the "pipes of Pan" in his right hand and a stick for hunting hares on the left. Others believe that this is the Shrine of the Nymphs and the river-god Achelous, with a spring of cold water, a plane tree and a willow, where, as Plato writes, Socrates and Phaedros sat during their philosophical chats. It then flows under Theseos Avenue, in the suburb of Kallithea, its original course turning sharply northwest to join the Kifissos River, of which it was once a tributary. The Ilisos is now routed straight to sea, coming to surface and flowing into the Saronic Gulf in the middle of Phaleron Bay.
