= Cynosarges =

Area of ancient Athens

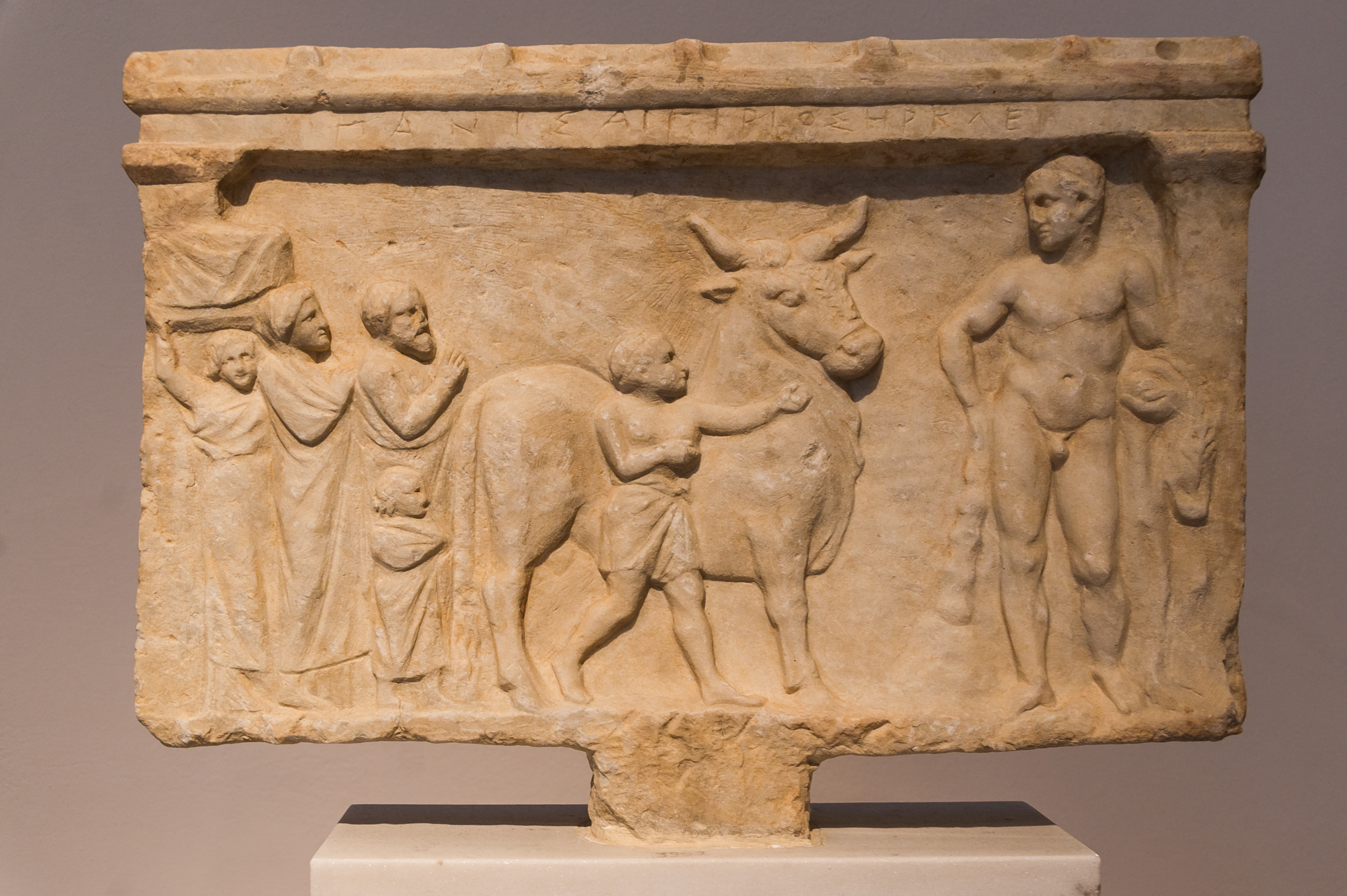
Votive relief found at river Ilissos

Cynosarges (Ancient Greek: Κυνόσαργες Kynosarges) was a famous temple of Heracles, public gymnasium, and surrounding grove located just outside the walls of Ancient Athens on the southern bank of the Ilissos river and near the Diomeian gate. The modern suburb of Kynosargous is named after it.

== Overview ==
Cynosarges lay somewhat northeast of the Lyceum. Its exact site is unknown but it is generally located in what is now the southern suburbs of Athens.

Its name was a mystery to the ancients that was explained by a story about a white or swift dog, etymologising the name as Kynos argos, from genitive of kyon (dog) and argos (white, shining, or swift). The legend goes that on one occasion when Didymos, an Athenian, was performing a lavish sacrifice, a white (or swift) dog appeared and snatched the offering; Didymos was alarmed, but received an oracular message saying that he should establish a temple to Heracles in the place where the dog dropped the offering. In another version the man was called Diomus and he was a lover of Heracles.

Herodotus mentions that a shrine was attested there around the period of 490/89 BC, and it became a famous sanctuary of Heracles that was also associated with his mother Alcmene, his wife Hebe and his nephew/helper Iolaus. It appeared that Heracles and Hebe each had a dedicated altar whereas Alcmene and Iolaus shared one. A renowned gymnasium was built there; it was meant especially for nothoi, illegitimate children. The Cynosarges was also where the Cynic Antisthenes was said to have lectured, a fact which was offered as one explanation as to how the sect got the name of Cynics.

A festival was held at Cynosarges in honour of Heracles in the month of Metageitnion, at which twelve nothoi were chosen to be parasitoi (fellow diners), who ate a meal with the cult statue of the god. They returned for smaller meals each month for a year where a priest would perform sacrifices. People who refused to serve as parasitoi were liable to be prosecuted in the Athenian court system. Clement recorded that Philip II of Macedon, who claimed Heracles as an ancestor, was honoured with a cult at the site.

Suda writes that since Herakles was reputed to be a bastard, for that reason the bastards, those qualifying as citizens neither paternally nor maternally, used to exercise there.

Archaeological excavations were carried out in 1896-7 by Cecil Smith, the Director of the British School at Athens and BSA student Robert Carr Bosanquet.

== See also ==
- Athenian festivals
